= 2022 European Table Tennis Championships – Men's singles =

Men's singles at the 2022 European Table Tennis Championships
- Venue: Rudi-Sedlmayer-Halle
- Location: Munich, Germany
- Dates: 14–21 August
- Competitors: 115 from 38 nations

Medalists
gold medal	Dang Qiu (GER)
silver medal	Darko Jorgić (SLO)
bronze medal	Mattias Falck (SWE)
bronze medal	Kristian Karlsson (SWE)

The men's singles competition of the 2022 European Table Tennis Championships was held from 14 to 21 August 2022.

== Playing system ==
Draw of 64
32 seeded players
24 winners of the qualification groups
8 winners of the preliminary round 2 matches

== Group Play Stage ==
The winners of the groups will qualify to the Main Draw.
The runners-up from all the groups will play 2 preliminary rounds for the remaining 8 spots.

=== Group 1 ===
Pos	Team	W	L	SF	SA	SD	Pts		POL (CZE)	HAU (NOR)	MOU (SUI)
1	Tomáš Polanský (CZE)	1	1	5	3	+2	3	Qualification for Main Draw	—	2–3	3–0
2	Borgar Haug (NOR)	1	1	4	5	−1	3	Qualification for preliminary rounds	3–2	—	1–3
3	Barish Moullet (SUI)	1	1	3	4	−1	3		0–3	3–1	—

Source: Munich 2022

=== Group 2 ===
Pos	Team	W	L	SF	SA	SD	Pts		ALL (BEL)	KAR (SRB)	LIM (UKR)
1	Martin Allegro (BEL)	2	0	6	0	+6	4	Qualification for Main Draw	—	3–0	3–0
2	Aleksandar Karakašević (SRB)	1	1	3	4	−1	3	Qualification for preliminary rounds	0–3	—	3–1
3	Anton Limonov (UKR)	0	2	1	6	−5	2		0–3	1–3	—

Source: Munich 2022

=== Group 3 ===
Pos	Team	W	L	SF	SA	SD	Pts		NUY (BEL)	RAS (DEN)	BER (ESP)
1	Cedric Nuytinck (BEL)	2	0	6	0	+6	4	Qualification for Main Draw	—	3–0	3–0
2	Tobias Rasmussen (DEN)	1	1	3	4	−1	3	Qualification for preliminary rounds	0–3	—	3–1
3	Daniel Berzosa (ESP)	0	2	1	6	−5	2		0–3	1–3	—

Source: Munich 2022

=== Group 4 ===
Pos	Team	W	L	SF	SA	SD	Pts		WAL (ENG)	JEV (SRB)	YIĞ (TUR)
1	Sam Walker (ENG)	2	0	6	1	+5	4	Qualification for Main Draw	—	3–1	3–0
2	Marko Jevtović (SRB)	1	1	4	4	0	3	Qualification for preliminary rounds	1–3	—	3–1
3	Abdullah Talha Yiğenler (TUR)	0	2	1	6	−5	2		0–3	1–3	—

Source: Munich 2022

=== Group 5 ===
Pos	Team	W	L	SF	SA	SD	Pts		HRI (SLO)	STO (SUI)	KUB (POL)
1	Peter Hribar (SLO)	1	1	4	4	0	3	Qualification for Main Draw	—	1–3	3–1
2	Loïc Stoll (SUI)	1	1	4	4	0	3	Qualification for preliminary rounds	3–1	—	1–3
3	Maciej Kubik (POL)	1	1	4	4	0	3		1–3	3–1	—

Source: Munich 2022

=== Group 6 ===
Pos	Team	W	L	SF	SA	SD	Pts		STO (ITA)	GÜN (TUR)	MAS (ESP)
1	Niagol Stoyanov (ITA)	1	1	5	4	+1	3	Qualification for Main Draw	—	2–3	3–1
2	İbrahim Gündüz (TUR)	1	1	5	5	0	3	Qualification for preliminary rounds	3–2	—	2–3
3	Joan Masip (ESP)	1	1	4	5	−1	3		1–3	3–2	—

Source: Munich 2022

=== Group 7 ===
Pos	Team	W	L	SF	SA	SD	Pts		JAR (ENG)	PUŢ (MDA)	GLO (LUX)
1	Tom Jarvis (ENG)	2	0	6	2	+4	4	Qualification for Main Draw	—	3–2	3–0
2	Andrei Puţuntică (MDA)	1	1	5	4	+1	3	Qualification for preliminary rounds	2–3	—	3–1
3	Eric Glod (LUX)	0	2	1	6	−5	2		0–3	1–3	—

Source: Munich 2022

=== Group 8 ===
Pos	Team	W	L	SF	SA	SD	Pts		ȘIP (ROU)	STA (GRE)	KLA (SVK)
1	Rareș Șipoș (ROU)	2	0	6	2	+4	4	Qualification for Main Draw	—	3–2	3–0
2	Georgios Stamatouros (GRE)	1	1	5	4	+1	3	Qualification for preliminary rounds	2–3	—	3–1
3	Adam Klajber (SVK)	0	2	1	6	−5	2		0–3	1–3	—

Source: Munich 2022

=== Group 9 ===
Pos	Team	W	L	SF	SA	SD	Pts		LEV (AUT)	PET (SRB)	YIL (TUR)
1	Andreas Levenko (AUT)	2	0	6	2	+4	4	Qualification for Main Draw	—	3–2	3–0
2	Zsolt Peto (SRB)	1	1	5	3	+2	3	Qualification for preliminary rounds	2–3	—	3–0
3	Tugay Şirzat Yılmaz (TUR)	0	2	0	6	−6	2		0–3	0–3	—

Source: Munich 2022

=== Group 10 ===
Pos	Team	W	L	SF	SA	SD	Pts		RAS (BEL)	CVE (SLO)	ISR (ISR)
1	Adrien Rassenfosse (BEL)	2	0	6	0	+6	4	Qualification for Main Draw	—	3–0	3–0
2	Tilen Cvetko (SLO)	1	1	3	5	−2	3	Qualification for preliminary rounds	0–3	—	3–2
3	Tal Israeli (ISR)	0	2	2	6	−4	2		0–3	2–3	—

Source: Munich 2022

=== Group 11 ===
Pos	Team	W	L	SF	SA	SD	Pts		PRY (UKR)	KON (GRE)	CAB (ESP)
1	Ievgen Pryshchepa (UKR)	2	0	6	4	+2	4	Qualification for Main Draw	—	3–2	3–2
2	Giorgos Konstantinopoulos (GRE)	1	1	5	4	+1	3	Qualification for preliminary rounds	2–3	—	3–1
3	Carlos Caballero (ESP)	0	2	3	6	−3	2		2–3	1–3	—

Source: Munich 2022

=== Group 12 ===
Pos	Team	W	L	SF	SA	SD	Pts		MAJ (HUN)	ZEL (SVK)	GRE (UKR)
1	János Majoros (HUN)	2	0	6	1	+5	4	Qualification for Main Draw	—	3–1	3–0
2	Jakub Zelinka (SVK)	1	1	4	3	+1	3	Qualification for preliminary rounds	1–3	—	3–0
3	Andrii Grebeniuk (UKR)	0	2	0	6	−6	2		0–3	0–3	—

Source: Munich 2022

=== Group 13 ===
Pos	Team	W	L	SF	SA	SD	Pts		LIN (DEN)	MOV (ROU)	TAU (ISR)
1	Anders Lind (DEN)	2	0	6	0	+6	4	Qualification for Main Draw	—	3–0	3–0
2	Darius Movileanu (ROU)	1	1	3	5	−2	3	Qualification for preliminary rounds	0–3	—	3–2
3	Michael Tauber (ISR)	0	2	2	6	−4	2		0–3	2–3	—

Source: Munich 2022

=== Group 14 ===
Pos	Team	W	L	SF	SA	SD	Pts		RED (POL)	BOB (ITA)	FRØ (NOR)	KOG (LAT)
1	Miłosz Redzimski (POL)	3	0	9	1	+8	6	Qualification for Main Draw	—	3–1	3–0	3–0
2	Mihai Bobocica (ITA)	2	1	7	4	+3	5	Qualification for preliminary rounds	1–3	—	3–1	3–0
3	Martin Frøseth (NOR)	1	2	4	6	−2	4		0–3	1–3	—	3–0
4	Daniels Kogans (LAT)	0	3	0	9	−9	3		0–3	0–3	0–3	—

Source: Munich 2022

=== Group 15 ===
Pos	Team	W	L	SF	SA	SD	Pts		KOŽ (SLO)	AND (DEN)	MLA (LUX)	NIE (GRL)
1	Deni Kožul (SLO)	3	0	9	2	+7	6	Qualification for Main Draw	—	3–1	3–1	3–0
2	Martin Andersen (DEN)	2	1	7	4	+3	5	Qualification for preliminary rounds	1–3	—	3–1	3–0
3	Luka Mladenovic (LUX)	1	2	5	6	−1	4		1–3	1–3	—	3–0
4	Ivik Nielsen (GRL)	0	3	0	9	−9	3		0–3	0–3	0–3	—

Source: Munich 2022

=== Group 16 ===
Pos	Team	W	L	SF	SA	SD	Pts		LAM (BEL)	YIA (CYP)	PIŠ (SVK)	KON (GRE)
1	Florent Lambiet (BEL)	3	0	9	1	+8	6	Qualification for Main Draw	—	3–0	3–1	3–0
2	Marios Yiangou (CYP)	2	1	6	4	+2	5	Qualification for preliminary rounds	0–3	—	3–1	3–0
3	Ľubomír Pištej (SVK)	1	2	5	7	−2	4		1–3	1–3	—	3–1
4	Konstantinos Konstantinopoulos (GRE)	0	3	1	9	−8	3		0–3	0–3	1–3	—

Source: Munich 2022

=== Group 17 ===
Pos	Team	W	L	SF	SA	SD	Pts		AND (HUN)	KUL (POL)	ŽEI (LTU)	LIB (EST)
1	Csaba András (HUN)	3	0	9	1	+8	6	Qualification for Main Draw	—	3–0	3–1	3–0
2	Samuel Kulczycki (POL)	2	1	6	3	+3	5	Qualification for preliminary rounds	0–3	—	3–0	3–0
3	Kęstutis Žeimys (LTU)	1	2	4	6	−2	4		1–3	0–3	—	3–0
4	Toomas Libene (EST)	0	3	0	9	−9	3		0–3	0–3	0–3	—

Source: Munich 2022

=== Group 18 ===
Pos	Team	W	L	SF	SA	SD	Pts		MAR (CZE)	ALE (BUL)	SER (AUT)	KAR (KOS)
1	Jiří Martinko (CZE)	3	0	9	0	+9	6	Qualification for Main Draw	—	3–0	3–0	3–0
2	Teodor Alexandrov (BUL)	2	1	6	5	+1	5	Qualification for preliminary rounds	0–3	—	3–2	3–0
3	David Serdaroglu (AUT)	1	2	5	6	−1	4		0–3	2–3	—	3–0
4	Fatih Karabaxhak (KOS)	0	3	0	9	−9	3		0–3	0–3	0–3	—

Source: Munich 2022

=== Group 19 ===
Pos	Team	W	L	SF	SA	SD	Pts		REI (CZE)	SZU (HUN)	NAU (FIN)	GIA (SMR)
1	David Reitšpies (CZE)	3	0	9	2	+7	6	Qualification for Main Draw	—	3–1	3–1	3–0
2	Ádám Szudi (HUN)	2	1	7	5	+2	5	Qualification for preliminary rounds	1–3	—	3–2	3–0
3	Alex Naumi (FIN)	1	2	6	6	0	4		1–3	2–3	—	3–0
4	Federico Giardi (SMR)	0	3	0	9	−9	3		0–3	0–3	0–3	—

Source: Munich 2022

=== Group 20 ===
Pos	Team	W	L	SF	SA	SD	Pts		PIC (ITA)	CHE (AUT)	RAD (MNE)	REI (LAT)
1	Jordy Piccolin (ITA)	3	0	9	0	+9	6	Qualification for Main Draw	—	3–0	3–0	3–0
2	Alexander Chen (AUT)	2	1	6	5	+1	5	Qualification for preliminary rounds	0–3	—	3–2	3–0
3	Filip Radović (MNE)	1	2	5	7	−2	4		0–3	2–3	—	3–1
4	Artūrs Reinholds (LAT)	0	3	1	9	−8	3		0–3	0–3	1–3	—

Source: Munich 2022

=== Group 21 ===
Pos	Team	W	L	SF	SA	SD	Pts		ZHM (UKR)	ŠIR (CZE)	KRA (BUL)	SMI (EST)
1	Yaroslav Zhmudenko (UKR)	3	0	9	1	+8	6	Qualification for Main Draw	—	3–0	3–0	3–1
2	Pavel Širuček (CZE)	2	1	6	5	+1	5	Qualification for preliminary rounds	0–3	—	3–0	3–2
3	Petyo Krastev (BUL)	1	2	3	6	−3	4		0–3	0–3	—	3–0
4	Aleksandr Smirnov (EST)	0	3	3	9	−6	3		1–3	2–3	0–3	—

Source: Munich 2022

=== Group 22 ===
Pos	Team	W	L	SF	SA	SD	Pts		SGO (GRE)	ION (ROU)	MON (SMR)	MLA (MKD)
1	Ioannis Sgouropoulos (GRE)	3	0	9	1	+8	6	Qualification for Main Draw	—	3–1	3–0	3–0
2	Eduard Ionescu (ROU)	2	1	7	4	+3	5	Qualification for preliminary rounds	1–3	—	3–1	3–0
3	Mattias Mongiusti (SMR)	1	2	4	7	−3	4		0–3	1–3	—	3–1
4	Filip Mladenovski (MKD)	0	3	1	9	−8	3		0–3	0–3	1–3	—

Source: Munich 2022

=== Group 23 ===
Pos	Team	W	L	SF	SA	SD	Pts		URS (MDA)	KOJ (CRO)	CHI (ROU)	GUT (BIH)
1	Vladislav Ursu (MDA)	3	0	9	2	+7	6	Qualification for Main Draw	—	3–0	3–2	3–0
2	Frane Tomislav Kojić (CRO)	2	1	6	5	+1	5	Qualification for preliminary rounds	0–3	—	3–2	3–0
3	Iulian Chirița (ROU)	1	2	7	6	+1	4		2–3	2–3	—	3–0
4	Edin Gutić (BIH)	0	3	0	9	−9	3		0–3	0–3	0–3	—

Source: Munich 2022

=== Group 24 ===
Pos	Team	W	L	SF	SA	SD	Pts		LEV (SRB)	LAK (HUN)	RAD (MNE)	NAV (LTU)
1	Dimitrije Levajac (SRB)	3	0	9	2	+7	6	Qualification for Main Draw	—	3–1	3–0	3–1
2	Tamás Lakatos (HUN)	2	1	7	4	+3	5	Qualification for preliminary rounds	1–3	—	3–1	3–0
3	Filip Radulović (MNE)	1	2	4	7	−3	4		0–3	1–3	—	3–1
4	Ignas Navickas (LTU)	0	3	2	9	−7	3		1–3	0–3	1–3	—

Source: Munich 2022

== Preliminary round ==
The winners of the preliminary round 2 matches will qualify for the Main draw.

Preliminary round 1		Preliminary round 2
		T Lakatos (HUN)	3
G Stamatouros (GRE)	0	Z Peto (SRB)	0
Z Peto (SRB)	3
		FT Kojić (CRO)	3
A Puţuntică (MDA)	3	A Puţuntică (MDA)	0
T Cvetko (SLO)	1
		E Ionescu (ROU)	1
İ Gündüz (TUR)	3	İ Gündüz (TUR)	3
G Konstantinopoulos (GRE)	0
		P Širuček (CZE)	3
L Stoll (SUI)	1	J Zelinka (SVK)	0
J Zelinka (SVK)	3
		A Chen (AUT)	0
M Jevtović (SRB)	3	M Jevtović (SRB)	3
D Movileanu (ROU)	1
		Á Szudi (HUN)	3
T Rasmussen (DEN)	0	M Bobocica (ITA)	0
M Bobocica (ITA)	3
		T Alexandrov (BUL)	1
A Karakašević (SRB)	1	M Andersen (DEN)	3
M Andersen (DEN)	3
		S Kulczycki (POL)	3
B Haug (NOR)	3	B Haug (NOR)	2
M Yiangou (CYP)	2

== Main Draw ==
Results

=== Section 1 ===
First round
1	(Sweden) Truls Möregårdh	7	8	11	11	11	11
(Hungary) Lakatos Tamás	11	11	9	4	7	7
(Czech Republic) Jiří Martinko	9	11	11	7	9	8
17	(Portugal) João Geraldo	11	9	6	11	11	11
25	(Romania) Ovidiu Ionescu	9	11	12	7	11	7	7
(Ukraine) Yaroslav Zhmudenko	11	9	10	11	5	11	11
(England) Sam Walker	11	4	8	11	10	7
16	(Sweden) Jon Persson	6	11	11	7	12	11
6	(Sweden) Mattias Falck	6	10	11	12	11	11
(Austria) Andreas Levenko	11	12	6	10	1	9
(Poland) Miłosz Redzimski	10	11	11	11	7	10	11
24	(Finland) Benedek Olah	12	6	9	8	11	12	7
31	(Portugal) João Monteiro	10	11	17	10	11	11	9
(Hungary) Bence Majoros	12	9	19	12	8	6	11
(Hungary) Ádám Szudi	4	9	10	12
7	(Sweden) Anton Källberg	11	11	12	14

Second round
1	(Sweden) Truls Möregårdh	11	11	11	11
17	(Portugal) João Geraldo	7	8	7	3
(Ukraine) Yaroslav Zhmudenko	2	14	9	8	6
16	(Sweden) Jon Persson	11	12	11	11	11
6	(Sweden) Mattias Falck	11	7	11	11	10	11
(Poland) Miłosz Redzimski	6	11	4	8	12	7
(Hungary) Bence Majoros	8	8	13	11	9
7	(Sweden) Anton Källberg	11	11	15	7	11

Third round
1	(Sweden) Truls Möregårdh	10	11	11	11	12
16	(Sweden) Jon Persson	12	8	4	6	10
6	(Sweden) Mattias Falck	9	11	11	14	11
7	(Sweden) Anton Källberg	11	7	8	12	6

Fourth round
1	(Sweden) Truls Möregårdh	13	11	8	7	9	5
6	(Sweden) Mattias Falck	11	4	11	11	11	11

=== Section 2 ===
Round of 64
5	T Boll (GER)	4
S Kulczycki (POL)	2
T Jarvis (ENG)	3
30	L Jančařík (CZE)	4
19	Y Wang (SVK)	4
V Ursu (MDA)	0
D Kožul (SLO)	0
10	A Gaćina (CRO)	4
12	B Duda (GER)	4
J Piccolin (ITA)	1
A Lind (DEN)	1
26	D Habesohn (AUT)	4
22	Á Robles (ESP)	3
I Sgouropoulos (GRE)	4
İ Gündüz (TUR)	3
4	D Qiu (GER)	4

Round of 32
5	T Boll (GER)	4
30	L Jančařík (CZE)	0
19	Y Wang (SVK)	4
10	A Gaćina (CRO)	1
12	B Duda (GER)	4
26	D Habesohn (AUT)	3
I Sgouropoulos (GRE)	0
4	D Qiu (GER)	4

Round of 16
5	T Boll (GER)	4
19	Y Wang (SVK)	0
12	B Duda (GER)	1
4	D Qiu (GER)	4

Quarterfinals
5	T Boll (GER)	0
4	D Qiu (GER)	4

=== Section 3 ===
Round of 64
3	D Ovtcharov (GER)	4
M Andersen (DEN)	1
C András (HUN)	4
18	E Lebesson (FRA)	3
23	J Groth (DEN)	3
D Levajac (SRB)	4
N Stoyanov (ITA)	0
13	M Freitas (POR)	4
14	R Gardos (AUT)	1
C Nuytinck (BEL)	4
M Allegro (BEL)	1
21	A Lebrun (FRA)	4
32	F Lebrun (FRA)	4
F Lambiet (BEL)	1
FT Kojić (CRO)	2
8	K Karlsson (SWE)	4

Round of 32
3	D Ovtcharov (GER)	4
C András (HUN)	0
D Levajac (SRB)	0
13	M Freitas (POR)	4
C Nuytinck (BEL)	0
21	A Lebrun (FRA)	4
32	F Lebrun (FRA)	1
8	K Karlsson (SWE)	4

Round of 16
3	D Ovtcharov (GER)	4
13	M Freitas (POR)	3
21	A Lebrun (FRA)	2
8	K Karlsson (SWE)	4

Quarterfinals
3	D Ovtcharov (GER)	2
8	K Karlsson (SWE)	4

=== Section 4 ===
Round of 64
6	P Franziska (GER)	4
P Širuček (CZE)	0
I Pryshchepa (UKR)	3
28	J Dyjas (POL)	4
27	T Apolónia (POR)	4
D Reitšpies (CZE)	0
T Polanský (CZE)	1
9	L Pitchford (ENG)	4
11	S Gauzy (FRA)	3
A Rassenfosse (BEL)	4
R Șipoș (ROU)	1
20	T Pucar (CRO)	4
29	F Zeljko (CRO)	4
P Hribar (SLO)	0
M Jevtović (SRB)	1
2	D Jorgić (SLO)	4

Round of 32
6	P Franziska (GER)	4
28	J Dyjas (POL)	1
27	T Apolónia (POR)	4
9	L Pitchford (ENG)	2
A Rassenfosse (BEL)	3
20	T Pucar (CRO)	4
29	F Zeljko (CRO)	2
2	D Jorgić (SLO)	4

Round of 16
6	P Franziska (GER)	2
27	T Apolónia (POR)	4
20	T Pucar (CRO)	1
2	D Jorgić (SLO)	4

Quarterfinals
27	T Apolónia (POR)	3
2	D Jorgić (SLO)	4

=== Finals ===
Quarterfinals			Semifinals			Final
1	T Möregårdh (SWE)	2
15	M Falck (SWE)	4	15	M Falck (SWE)	1
5	T Boll (GER)	0	4	D Qiu (GER)	4
4	D Qiu (GER)	4				4	D Qiu (GER)	4
3	D Ovtcharov (GER)	2				2	D Jorgić (SLO)	1
8	K Karlsson (SWE)	4	8	K Karlsson (SWE)	2
27	T Apolónia (POR)	3	2	D Jorgić (SLO)	4
2	D Jorgić (SLO)	4

== Participating nations ==
115 players from 38 nations.

- Austria (5)
- Belgium (4)
- Bosnia and Herzegovina (1)
- Bulgaria (2)
- Croatia (4)
- Cyprus (1)
- Czech Republic (5)
- Denmark (4)
- England (3)
- Estonia (2)
- Finland (2)
- France (4)
- Germany (5)
- Greece (4)
- Greenland (1)
- Hungary (4)
- Israel (2)
- Italy (3)
- Kosovo (1)
- Latvia (2)
- Lithuania (2)
- Luxembourg (2)
- Moldova (2)
- Montenegro (2)
- North Macedonia (1)
- Norway (2)
- Poland (4)
- Portugal (4)
- Romania (5)
- San Marino (2)
- Serbia (4)
- Slovakia (4)
- Slovenia (4)
- Spain (4)
- Sweden (5)
- Switzerland (2)
- Turkey (3)
- Ukraine (4)
