= 2024 European Table Tennis Championships – Men's singles =

Men's singles at the 2024 European Table Tennis Championships
- Venue: TipsArena Linz
- Location: Linz, Austria
- Dates: 15–20 October

Medalists
gold medal	Alexis Lebrun (FRA)
silver medal	Benedikt Duda (GER)
bronze medal	Dimitrij Ovtcharov (GER)
bronze medal	Truls Möregårdh (SWE)

The men's singles competition of the 2024 European Table Tennis Championships was held from 15 to 20 October 2024.

== Playing system ==
Draw of 64
32 seeded players
32 winners of the qualification groups

== Group Play Stage ==
The winners of the groups will qualify to the Main Draw.
The runners-up from all the groups will play 2 preliminary rounds for the remaining 8 spots.

== Main Draw ==
Results

=== Section 1 ===
Round of 64
1	F Lebrun (FRA)	4
A Yiğenler (TUR)	0
L Jančařík (CZE)	1
18	M Falck (SWE)	4
32	L Bardet (FRA)	3
A Bertelsmeier (GER)	4
T Abiodun (POR)	0
16	O Ionescu (ROU)	4
10	B Duda (GER)	4
N Ecseki (HUN)	0
L Pištej (SVK)	4
23	D Habesohn (AUT)	1
27	T Apolonia (POR)	3
Á Szudi (HUN)	4
J Pérez (ESP)	4
8	J Groth (DEN)	3

Round of 32
1	F Lebrun (FRA)	4
18	M Falck (SWE)	0
A Bertelsmeier (GER)	4
16	O Ionescu (ROU)	2
10	B Duda (GER)	4
L Pištej (SVK)	1
Á Szudi (HUN)	2
J Pérez (ESP)	4

Round of 16
1	F Lebrun (FRA)	4
A Bertelsmeier (GER)	1
10	B Duda (GER)	4
J Pérez (ESP)	0

Quarterfinals
1	F Lebrun (FRA)	3
10	B Duda (GER)	4

=== Section 2 ===
Round of 64
6	D Ovtcharov (GER)	4
I Sgouropoulos (GRE)	1
Y Velichkov (BUL)	0
29	M Allegro (BEL)	4
17	T Pucar (CRO)	4
P Širuček (CZE)	0
K van Oost (NED)	4
14	M Freitas (POR)	0
11	A Lind (DEN)	4
K Angelakis (GRE)	1
C Nuytinck (BEL)	0
19	A Gaćina (CRO)	4
28	J Geraldo (POR)	4
T Lakatos (HUN)	3
J Rzihauschek (AUT)	0
3	P Franziska (GER)	4

Round of 32
6	D Ovtcharov (GER)	4
29	M Allegro (BEL)	0
17	T Pucar (CRO)	3
14	M Freitas (POR)	4
11	A Lind (DEN)	3
19	A Gaćina (CRO)	4
28	J Geraldo (POR)	1
3	P Franziska (GER)	4

Round of 16
6	D Ovtcharov (GER)	4
14	M Freitas (POR)	2
19	A Gaćina (CRO)	1
3	P Franziska (GER)	4

Quarterfinals
6	D Ovtcharov (GER)	4
3	P Franziska (GER)	0

=== Section 3 ===
Round of 64
4	D Qiu (GER)	4
G Camara (NED)	0
S Walker (ENG)	0
24	Y Wang (SVK)	4
30	D Kožul (SLO)	3
I Ban (CRO)	4
F Zeljko (CRO)	2
13	Á Robles (ESP)	4
12	S Gauzy (FRA)	4
A Levenko (AUT)	3
Y Zhmudenko (UKR)	3
21	M Redzimski (POL)	4
26	J Rolland (FRA)	3
B Oláh (FIN)	4
B Majoros (HUN)	0
7	A Lebrun (FRA)	4

Round of 32
4	D Qiu (GER)	4
24	Y Wang (SVK)	0
I Ban (CRO)	3
13	Á Robles (ESP)	4
12	S Gauzy (FRA)	0
21	M Redzimski (POL)	4
B Oláh (FIN)	2
7	A Lebrun (FRA)	4

Round of 16
4	D Qiu (GER)	4
13	Á Robles (ESP)	0
21	M Redzimski (POL)	0
7	A Lebrun (FRA)	4

Quarterfinals
4	D Qiu (GER)	1
7	A Lebrun (FRA)	4

=== Section 4 ===
Round of 64
5	D Jorgić (SLO)	4
B Lei (HUN)	3
B Haug (NOR)	4
31	L Mladenovic (LUX)	1
22	K Karlsson (SWE)	4
J Monteiro (POR)	0
M Kubik (POL)	3
9	A Källberg (SWE)	4
15	L Pitchford (ENG)	4
R Gardos (AUT)	1
M Kolodziejczyk (AUT)	2
25	T Poret (FRA)	4
20	E Ionescu (ROU)	4
V Ursu (MDA)	2
F Lambiet (BEL)	0
2	T Möregårdh (SWE)	4

Round of 32
5	D Jorgić (SLO)	4
B Haug (NOR)	1
22	K Karlsson (SWE)	1
9	A Källberg (SWE)	4
15	L Pitchford (ENG)	1
25	T Poret (FRA)	4
20	E Ionescu (ROU)	0
2	T Möregårdh (SWE)	4

Round of 16
5	D Jorgić (SLO)	3
9	A Källberg (SWE)	4
25	T Poret (FRA)	1
2	T Möregårdh (SWE)	4

Quarterfinals
9	A Källberg (SWE)	2
2	T Möregårdh (SWE)	4

=== Finals ===
Quarterfinals			Semifinals			Final
1	F Lebrun (FRA)	3
10	B Duda (GER)	4	10	B Duda (GER)	4
6	D Ovtcharov (GER)	4	6	D Ovtcharov (GER)	2
3	P Franziska (GER)	0				10	B Duda (GER)	0
4	D Qiu (GER)	1				7	A Lebrun (FRA)	4
7	A Lebrun (FRA)	4	7	A Lebrun (FRA)	4
9	A Källberg (SWE)	2	2	T Möregårdh (SWE)	0
2	T Möregårdh (SWE)	4

== Participating nations ==
132 players from 40 nations.

- Individual Neutral Athletes (2)
- Austria (6)
- Azerbaijan (2)
- Belgium (4)
- Bulgaria (2)
- Croatia (5)
- Cyprus (1)
- Czech Republic (4)
- Denmark (4)
- England (4)
- Estonia (2)
- Finland (3)
- France (6)
- Germany (6)
- Greece (3)
- Greenland (2)
- Hungary (6)
- Iceland (2)
- Israel (3)
- Italy (3)
- Latvia (4)
- Lithuania (3)
- Luxembourg (1)
- Moldova (2)
- Netherlands (3)
- North Macedonia (1)
- Norway (3)
- Poland (3)
- Portugal (5)
- Romania (5)
- San Marino (2)
- Scotland (2)
- Serbia (3)
- Slovakia (4)
- Slovenia (4)
- Spain (3)
- Sweden (5)
- Switzerland (3)
- Turkey (3)
- Ukraine (4)
