= 2023 World Table Tennis Championships – Men's singles =

Men's singles at the 2023 World Table Tennis Championships
- Venue: Durban International Convention Centre
- Location: Durban, KwaZulu-Natal, South Africa
- Dates: 20–28 May

Medalists
gold medal	Fan Zhendong	China
silver medal	Wang Chuqin	China
bronze medal	Liang Jingkun	China
bronze medal	Ma Long	China

The men's singles competition of the 2023 World Table Tennis Championships was held from 20 to 28 May 2023. The event was played as a straight knockout. All singles matches were best of 7 games.

By making the final, Fan Zhendong retained the ITTF no. 1 singles ranking. Wang Chuqin and Ma Long were also in contention for the ITTF no. 1 singles ranking.

== Seeds ==
Singles events had 32 seeded players. Seeding was based on the ITTF world ranking published on 16 May 2023.

1. (China) Fan Zhendong (champion)
2. (China) Wang Chuqin (final)
3. (China) Ma Long (semifinals)
4. (Japan) Tomokazu Harimoto (quarterfinals)
5. (China) Liang Jingkun (semifinals)
6. (Brazil) Hugo Calderano (first round)
7. (Sweden) Truls Möregårdh (third round)
8. (China) Lin Gaoyuan (quarterfinals)
9. (Chinese Taipei) Lin Yun-ju (fourth round)
10. (Germany) Dang Qiu (fourth round)
11. (South Korea) Lim Jong-hoon (fourth round)
12. (Nigeria) Quadri Aruna (second round)
13. (Slovenia) Darko Jorgić (fourth round)
14. (South Korea) Jang Woo-jin (fourth round)
15. (Germany) Dimitrij Ovtcharov (third round)
16. (Germany) Patrick Franziska (third round)
17. (France) Alexis Lebrun (third round)
18. (Japan) Yukiya Uda (third round)
19. (Chinese Taipei) Chuang Chih-yuan (third round)
20. (Sweden) Kristian Karlsson (third round)
21. (England) Liam Pitchford (first round)
22. (Sweden) Anton Källberg (first round)
23. (Croatia) Andrej Gaćina (first round)
24. (Sweden) Mattias Falck (first round)
25. (Germany) Ruwen Filus (third round)
26. (Hong Kong) Wong Chun Ting (third round)
27. (Germany) Benedikt Duda (first round)
28. (South Korea) Lee Sang-su (third round)
29. (Egypt) Omar Assar (quarterfinals)
30. (France) Félix Lebrun (third round)
31. (France) Simon Gauzy (second round)
32. (Slovakia) Wang Yang (second round)

== Draw ==
The draw took place on 18 May. Players of the same association were separated only in the first round of the draw.

=== Key ===
- r = Retired
- w/o = Walkover

=== Finals ===
Quarterfinals
1	(China) Fan Zhendong	11	13	11	11
29	(Egypt) Omar Assar	7	11	3	7
5	(China) Liang Jingkun	13	11	12	14	11	11
4	(Japan) Tomokazu Harimoto	11	9	14	16	9	9
3	(China) Ma Long	12	13	14	13	11
8	(China) Lin Gaoyuan	10	11	16	11	7
(Denmark) Anders Lind	10	6	8	12	8
2	(China) Wang Chuqin	12	11	11	10	11

Semifinals
1	(China) Fan Zhendong	11	7	12	11	8	11
5	(China) Liang Jingkun	5	11	10	7	11	8
3	(China) Ma Long	9	8	3	11	7
2	(China) Wang Chuqin	11	11	11	6	11

Final
1	(China) Fan Zhendong	8	11	11	12	11	11
2	(China) Wang Chuqin	11	9	7	10	13	3

=== Top half ===
==== Section 1 ====
First round
(Iran) Hodaei	15	11	11	7	4	8
(Greece) Gionis	13	13	7	11	11	11
(Belgium) Allegro	11	11	11	11
(Australia) Lee	5	6	8	7
(England) Walker	4	7	7	7
26	(Hong Kong) Wong	11	11	11	11
30	(France) F. Lebrun	10
(Iran) Ni. Alamian	11^{r}
(Chinese Taipei) Kao	11	11	11	11
(South Africa) Cogill	3	3	2	4
(England) Jarvis	9	8	11	2	15	13	6
(India) Gnanasekaran	11	11	7	11	13	11	11
(Brazil) Ishiy	11	9	11	13	8	3
10	(Germany) Qiu	7	11	13	11	11	11

Second round
1	(China) Fan	11	11	9	11	11
(Greece) Gionis	4	4	11	2	8
(Belgium) Allegro	4	11	4	9	8
26	(Hong Kong) Wong	11	8	11	11	11
30	(France) F. Lebrun	11	11	11	11
(Chinese Taipei) Kao	6	8	5	7
(India) Gnanasekaran	6	6	5	7
10	(Germany) Qiu	11	11	11	11

Third round
1	(China) Fan	8	11	11	11	11
26	(Hong Kong) Wong	11	7	5	9	6
30	(France) F. Lebrun	7	8	11	11	8	9
10	(Germany) Qiu	11	11	8	8	11	11

Fourth round
1	(China) Fan	12	11	11	11
10	(Germany) Qiu	10	7	8	5

==== Section 2 ====
First round
15	(Germany) Ovtcharov	11	7	12	8	11	11	11
(France) Akkuzu	8	11	14	11	8	9	3
(New Caledonia) Dey	9	5	8	8
(Italy) Stoyanov	11	11	11	11
(Ukraine) Zhmudenko	11	9	11	9	1	12
(Croatia) Pucar	3	11	5	11	11	14
(Puerto Rico) González	11	8	6	11	3	11	1
32	(Slovakia) Wang	6	11	11	8	11	8	11
29	(Egypt) O. Assar	5	10	11	9	11	11	11
(Ecuador) Miño	11	12	7	11	4	2	6
(Kazakhstan) Gerassimenko	10	12	11	11	11
(Iran) Ahmadian	12	10	9	5	7
(South Korea) Cho	11	7	13	11	11
(India) Shah	8	11	11	5	5
(Brazil) Jouti	6	8	4	4
7	(Sweden) Möregårdh	11	11	11	11

Second round
15	(Germany) Ovtcharov	12	11	11	6	12
(Italy) Stoyanov	10	9	7	11	10
(Croatia) Pucar	6	3	11	11	9	19	15
32	(Slovakia) Wang	11	11	8	9	11	17	13
29	(Egypt) O. Assar	9	11	7	11	11	15
(Kazakhstan) Gerassimenko	11	7	11	8	9	13
(South Korea) Cho	8	1	9	18	8
7	(Sweden) Möregårdh	11	11	11	16	11

Third round
15	(Germany) Ovtcharov	9	11	11	9	7	11	6
(Croatia) Pucar	11	8	9	11	11	6	11
29	(Egypt) O. Assar	11	3	4	11	11	11
7	(Sweden) Möregårdh	6	11	11	9	7	9

Fourth round
(Croatia) Pucar	6	9	10	8
29	(Egypt) O. Assar	11	11	12	11

==== Section 3 ====
First round
5	(China) Liang	11	11	11	11
(New Zealand) Dela Pena	8	9	2	3
(Australia) Luu	8	11	10	7
(Japan) Yoshimura	11	13	12	11
(Nigeria) Omotayo	6	15	12	5	8	5
(England) Drinkhall	11	13	10	11	11	11
(Croatia) Zeljko	11	9	7	5	11	11	11
27	(Germany) Duda	6	11	11	11	8	9	5
17	(France) A. Lebrun	11	11	11	11
(Ukraine) Pryshchepa	7	6	7	4
(South Africa) Levy	2	4	1	4
(Senegal) Diaw	11	11	11	11
(Portugal) Apolónia	11	11	11	11	15
(India) Desai	13	6	4	9	13
(Argentina) Cifuentes	11	3	11	10	6
13	(Slovenia) Jorgić	9	11	13	12	11

Second round
5	(China) Liang	11	11	10	11	14
(Japan) Yoshimura	5	5	12	4	12
(England) Drinkhall	12	9	11	9	15	11
(Croatia) Zeljko	10	11	6	11	13	8
17	(France) A. Lebrun	10	11	11	11	8	11
(Senegal) Diaw	12	9	8	9	11	5
(Portugal) Apolónia	11	9	8	6	9
13	(Slovenia) Jorgić	9	11	11	11	11

Third round
5	(China) Liang	11	11	9	12	13
(England) Drinkhall	4	5	11	10	11
17	(France) A. Lebrun	8	7	4	10
13	(Slovenia) Jorgić	11	11	11	12

Fourth round
5	(China) Liang	12	11	9	11	7	11
13	(Slovenia) Jorgić	10	5	11	6	11	7

==== Section 4 ====
First round
12	(Nigeria) Aruna	11	12	8	11	7	11
(Romania) O. Ionescu	7	10	11	5	11	9
(New Zealand) Amor	2	6	4	5
(Spain) Robles	11	11	11	11
(Italy) Bobocica	11	11	13	9	11
(Egypt) Saleh	7	9	11	11	4
(Romania) E. Ionescu	16	11	7	11	8	6	5
31	(France) Gauzy	14	3	11	6	11	11	11
19	(Chinese Taipei) Chuang	11	13	5	11	11
(Paraguay) Aguirre	5	11	11	7	6
(Poland) Kubik	11	11	11	11
(Egypt) K. Assar	6	8	8	5
(Hungary) Szudi	4	8	5	10
(Portugal) Freitas	11	11	11	12
(Singapore) Chew	3	7	1	6
4	(Japan) Harimoto	11	11	11	11

Second round
12	(Nigeria) Aruna	11	11	8	3	9	11	8
(Spain) Robles	8	9	11	11	11	3	11
(Italy) Bobocica	9	11	5	7	11	14	11
31	(France) Gauzy	11	8	11	11	8	12	9
19	(Chinese Taipei) Chuang	9	9	11	11	11	11
(Poland) Kubik	11	11	7	9	5	9
(Portugal) Freitas	10	8	9	10
4	(Japan) Harimoto	12	11	11	12

Third round
(Spain) Robles	9	11	11	9	7	14
(Italy) Bobocica	11	3	4	11	11	16
19	(Chinese Taipei) Chuang	7	9	5	7
4	(Japan) Harimoto	11	11	11	11

Fourth round
(Italy) Bobocica	5	10	10	10
4	(Japan) Harimoto	11	12	12	12

=== Bottom half ===
==== Section 5 ====
First round
3	(China) Ma	11	11	11	11
(Argentina) Alto	5	2	3	8
(Canada) Wang	11	11	11	6	7	12
(Hungary) Majoros	8	4	7	11	11	10
(South Africa) Nathoo	5	7	5	11	0
(Belgium) Rassenfosse	11	11	11	7	11
(Romania) Movileanu	4	4	0	5
20	(Sweden) Karlsson	11	11	11	11
22	(Sweden) Källberg	11	7	12	11	4	10	9
(Finland) Oláh	8	11	10	8	11	12	11
(South Korea) An	12	10	8	9	9
(Slovakia) Pištej	10	12	11	11	11
(Papua New Guinea) Loi
(Algeria) Bouloussa	^{w/o}
(Austria) Gardos	4	11	7	7	5
11	(South Korea) Lim	11	8	11	11	11

Second round
3	(China) Ma	15	11	11	11
(Canada) Wang	13	4	3	6
(Belgium) Rassenfosse	1	6	11	10	8
20	(Sweden) Karlsson	11	11	8	12	11
(Finland) Oláh	9	11	5	5	3
(Slovakia) Pištej	11	9	11	11	11
(Algeria) Bouloussa	9	11	11	7	14	4	8
11	(South Korea) Lim	11	8	9	11	12	11	11

Third round
3	(China) Ma	11	11	11	12	11
20	(Sweden) Karlsson	4	1	6	14	1
(Slovakia) Pištej	11	11	6	7	6	5
11	(South Korea) Lim	7	8	11	11	11	11

Fourth round
3	(China) Ma	11	11	11	11
11	(South Korea) Lim	7	5	3	6

==== Section 6 ====
First round
9	(Chinese Taipei) Lin	11	8	11	8	11	11
(Singapore) Quek	3	11	7	11	6	7
(United States) Liang	4	9	11	7	11	9
(Egypt) El-Beiali	11	11	3	11	8	11
(Chinese Taipei) Yang	11	11	11	12
(Hong Kong) Ho	6	6	7	10
(Nigeria) Abiodun	10	2	6	4
25	(Germany) Filus	12	11	11	11
28	(South Korea) Lee	11	11	11	11
(Chinese Taipei) Huang	7	6	8	3
(India) Achanta	11	9	11	11	11
(Austria) Serdaroglu	8	11	9	6	6
(Sweden) Persson	5	9	11	9	11	5
(Austria) Habesohn	11	11	5	11	9	11
(Poland) Dyjas	8	5	6	7
8	(China) Lin	11	11	11	11

Second round
9	(Chinese Taipei) Lin	11	11	11	11
(Egypt) El-Beiali	6	8	9	8
(Chinese Taipei) Yang	9	7	7	7
25	(Germany) Filus	11	11	11	11
28	(South Korea) Lee	11	13	11	12
(India) Achanta	4	11	8	10
(Austria) Habesohn	3	7	6	4
8	(China) Lin	11	11	11	11

Third round
9	(Chinese Taipei) Lin	13	11	11	11
25	(Germany) Filus	11	5	6	8
28	(South Korea) Lee	7	7	6	3
8	(China) Lin	11	11	11	11

Fourth round
9	(Chinese Taipei) Lin	11	7	9	9	8
8	(China) Lin	7	11	11	11	11

==== Section 7 ====
First round
6	(Brazil) Calderano	11	7	11	7	6	4
(Puerto Rico) Afanador	3	11	8	11	11	11
(Portugal) Monteiro	8	12	3	11	9	7
(Denmark) Lind	11	10	11	9	11	11
(Belgium) Lambiet	4	8	8	6
(Iran) No. Alamian	11	11	11	11
(Denmark) Groth	8	11	11	10	11	11
23	(Croatia) Gaćina	11	8	9	12	6	4
24	(Sweden) Falck	9	11	10	8	8
(Hong Kong) Lam	11	4	12	11	11
(Nigeria) Mati	7	7	11	11	12	11
(Czech Republic) Jančařík	11	11	6	9	10	8
(Australia) Lum	11	7	9	11	11	9	6
(Argentina) Lorenzo	8	11	11	6	7	11	11
(Singapore) Pang	7	11	4	5	12	11	4
14	(South Korea) Jang	11	5	11	11	10	5	11

Second round
(Puerto Rico) Afanador	9	7	11	5	6
(Denmark) Lind	11	11	6	11	11
(Iran) No. Alamian	11	11	9	15	3	4	11
(Denmark) Groth	5	9	11	13	11	11	9
(Hong Kong) Lam	11	14	11	9	11	8	6
(Nigeria) Mati	7	16	5	11	8	11	11
(Argentina) Lorenzo	3	8	9	4
14	(South Korea) Jang	11	11	11	11

Third round
(Denmark) Lind	12	11	10	11	11
(Iran) No. Alamian	10	5	12	5	9
(Nigeria) Mati	3	7	7	5
14	(South Korea) Jang	11	11	11	11

Fourth round
(Denmark) Lind	11	7	11	11	11
14	(South Korea) Jang	7	11	9	5	6

==== Section 8 ====
First round
16	(Germany) Franziska	11	11	12	3	11
(Belgium) Nuytinck	8	9	10	11	5
(Saudi Arabia) Alkhadrawi	11	6	10	11	13	3
(Australia) Dixon	6	11	12	6	15	11
(Mexico) Madrid	11	12	11	11	11
(Canada) Hazin	7	10	7	13	8
(Portugal) Geraldo	12	6	11	7	11	5	13
21	(England) Pitchford	10	11	9	11	5	11	11
18	(Japan) Uda	9	11	11	9	12	8	11
(Chile) Burgos	11	7	9	11	10	11	4
(Slovenia) Kožul	10	11	11	11	9	4	11
(Japan) Oikawa	12	9	6	5	11	11	2
(Japan) Togami	11	13	11	11	11
(Czech Republic) Polanský	3	15	8	7	7
(French Polynesia) Belrose	2	4	7	11	3
2	(China) Wang	11	11	11	9	11

Second round
16	(Germany) Franziska	11	11	11	11
(Australia) Dixon	1	3	1	5
(Mexico) Madrid	9	5	4	6
(Portugal) Geraldo	11	11	11	11
18	(Japan) Uda	11	18	7	11	11
(Slovenia) Kožul	7	16	11	9	9
(Japan) Togami	3	3	3	11	6
2	(China) Wang	11	11	11	6	11

Third round
16	(Germany) Franziska	11	7	15	8	12	11	6
(Portugal) Geraldo	4	11	17	11	10	7	11
18	(Japan) Uda	9	11	11	1	3
2	(China) Wang	11	13	4	11	11

Fourth round
(Portugal) Geraldo	4	4	4	10
2	(China) Wang	11	11	11	12

== Seeded Players ==
The following are the seeded players, based on the ITTF world ranking published on 16 May 2023.

Players are defending points from the 2021 World Table Tennis Championships, 2021 WTT Cup Finals and 2021 WTT Feeder, Dusseldorf if points from the tournaments are from the player's 8 best results.

Seed	Rank	Player	Points before	Points defending	Points earned	Points after	Status
1	1	(China) Fan Zhendong	9,375	2,000+1,500	2,000+100^{†}	7,975	Champion, defeated (China) Wang Chuqin
2	2	(China) Wang Chuqin	5,675	175+525	1,400+175^{†}	6,550	Runner-up, lost to (China) Fan Zhendong
3	3	(China) Ma Long	4,590	90^{†}	700	5,200	Semi-Finals lost to (China) Wang Chuqin
4	4	(Japan) Tomokazu Harimoto	4,425	1,050	350	3,725	Quarter-Finals lost to (China) Liang Jingkun
5	5	(China) Liang Jingkun	3,485	700	700	3,485	Semi-Finals lost to (China) Fan Zhendong
6	6	(Brazil) Hugo Calderano	3,450	350+525	105^{†}+100^{†}	2,780	First round lost to (Puerto Rico) Brian Afanador
7	7	(Sweden) Truls Möregårdh	3,315	1,400	90	2,005	Third round lost to (Egypt) Omar Assar
8	8	(China) Lin Gaoyuan	2,590	350+100	350+100^{†}	2,590	Quarter-Finals lost to (China) Ma Long
9	9	(Chinese Taipei) Lin Yun-Ju	2,205	105	175	2,275	Fourth round lost to (China) Lin Gaoyuan
10	10	(Germany) Dang Qiu	2,160	90^{†}	175	2,245	Fourth round lost to (China) Fan Zhendong
11	11	(South Korea) Lim Jong-hoon	1,955	175	175	1,955	Fourth round lost to (China) Ma Long
12	12	(Nigeria) Quadri Aruna	1,935	350+265	70^{†}+55^{†}	1,445	Second round lost to (Spain) Álvaro Robles
13	13	(Slovenia) Darko Jorgić	1,830	175	175	1,830	Fourth round lost to (China) Liang Jingkun
14	14	(South Korea) Jang Woo-jin	1,770	100	175	1,845	Fourth round lost to (Denmark) Anders Lind
15	15	(Germany) Dimitrij Ovtcharov	1,645	55^{†}	90	1,680	Third round lost to (Croatia) Tomislav Pucar
16	17	(Germany) Patrick Franziska	1,455	90+100	90+90^{†}	1,445	Third round lost to (Portugal) João Geraldo
17	19	(France) Alexis Lebrun	1,385	70^{†}	90	1,405	Third round lost to (Slovenia) Darko Jorgić
18	20	(Japan) Yukiya Uda	1,275	15^{†}	90	1,350	Third round lost to (China) Wang Chuqin
19	21	(Chinese Taipei) Chuang Chih-yuan	1,235	90^{†}	90	1,235	Third round lost to (Japan) Tomokazu Harimoto
20	22	(Sweden) Kristian Karlsson	1,230	175	90	1,145	Third round lost to (China) Ma Long
21	23	(England) Liam Pitchford	990	175+265	35^{†}+25^{†}	610	First round lost to (Portugal) João Geraldo
22	24	(Sweden) Anton Källberg	970	0	10	970^{&}	First round lost to (Finland) Benedek Oláh
23	25	(Croatia) Andrej Gaćina	940	45	15^{†}	910	First round lost to (Denmark) Jonathan Groth
24	26	(Sweden) Mattias Falck	930	100	35^{†}	865	First round lost to (Hong Kong) Lam Siu-hang
25	28	(Germany) Ruwen Filus	920	175	90	835	Third round lost to (Chinese Taipei) Lin Yun-ju
26	30	(Hong Kong) Wong Chun Ting	855	175+265	90+35^{†}	540	Third round lost to (China) Fan Zhendong
27	32	(Germany) Benedikt Duda	825	90+100	55^{†}+45^{†}	735	First round lost to (Croatia) Filip Zeljko
28	33	(South Korea) Lee Sang-su	730	45+100	90+35^{†}	710	Third round lost to (China) Lin Gaoyuan
29	34	(Egypt) Omar Assar	710	15^{†}	350	1045	Quarter-Finals lost to (China) Fan Zhendong
30	35	(France) Félix Lebrun	690	30^{†}	90	750	Third round lost to (Germany) Dang Qiu
31	36	(France) Simon Gauzy	685	90+100	45+25^{†}	565	Second round lost to (Italy) Mihai Bobocica
32	38	(Slovakia) Wang Yang	550	175	45	420	Second round lost to (Croatia) Tomislav Pucar

† Points from the player's 9th best result or 10th best result.
& No change in points because points from this tournament did not count as one of the player's 8 best results.
