= 2021 World Table Tennis Championships – Men's singles =

Men's singles at the 2021 World Table Tennis Championships
- Venue: George R. Brown Convention Center
- Location: Houston, United States
- Dates: 23–29 November
- Final score: 11–6, 11–9, 11–7, 11–8

Medalists
gold medal	Fan Zhendong	China
silver medal	Truls Möregårdh	Sweden
bronze medal	Liang Jingkun	China
bronze medal	Timo Boll	Germany

The men's singles competition of the 2021 World Table Tennis Championships was held from 23 to 29 November 2021.

Ma Long was the three-time defending champion, but did not compete in this year's tournament.

Fan Zhendong won the title after defeating Truls Möregårdh 11–6, 11–9, 11–7, 11–8.

== Seeds ==
Seeding was based on the ITTF world ranking published on 16 November 2021.

1. (China) Fan Zhendong (champion)
2. (Japan) Tomokazu Harimoto (second round)
3. (Brazil) Hugo Calderano (quarterfinals)
4. (Chinese Taipei) Lin Yun-ju (third round)
5. (China) Lin Gaoyuan (quarterfinals)
6. (China) Liang Jingkun (semifinals)
7. (Sweden) Mattias Falck (second round)
8. (Germany) Timo Boll (semifinals)
9. (South Korea) Jang Woo-jin (first round)
10. (Germany) Patrick Franziska (third round)
11. (England) Liam Pitchford (fourth round)
12. (China) Wang Chuqin (fourth round)
13. (Nigeria) Quadri Aruna (quarterfinals)
14. (France) Simon Gauzy (third round)
15. (Japan) Koki Niwa (second round)
16. (South Korea) Lee Sang-su (second round)
17. (Hong Kong) Wong Chun Ting (fourth round)
18. (Slovenia) Darko Jorgić (fourth round)
19. (Portugal) Marcos Freitas (second round)
20. (Chinese Taipei) Chuang Chih-yuan (second round)
21. (Austria) Robert Gardos (second round)
22. (Sweden) Kristian Karlsson (fourth round)
23. (Egypt) Omar Assar (first round)
24. (India) Sharath Kamal (first round)
25. (United States) Kanak Jha (quarterfinals)
26. (Denmark) Jonathan Groth (third round)
27. (Croatia) Tomislav Pucar (third round)
28. (Slovakia) Yang Wang (fourth round, withdrawn)
29. (Germany) Ruwen Filus (fourth round)
30. (India) Sathiyan Gnanasekaran (third round)
31. (Brazil) Gustavo Tsuboi (second round)
32. (France) Emmanuel Lebesson (third round)

== Draw ==
=== Finals ===
Quarterfinals
1	(China) Fan Zhendong	8	11	11	11	11
5	(China) Lin Gaoyuan	11	7	5	8	9
6	(China) Liang Jingkun	8	12	8	11	11	11	11
3	(Brazil) Hugo Calderano	11	14	11	8	4	8	8
(Sweden) Truls Möregårdh	13	11	2	11	12	11
13	(Nigeria) Quadri Aruna	11	8	11	4	14	7
8	(Germany) Timo Boll	4	11	12	11	9	11
25	(United States) Kanak Jha	11	5	10	7	11	7

Semifinals
1	(China) Fan Zhendong	11	11	11	8	13
6	(China) Liang Jingkun	5	4	9	11	11
(Sweden) Truls Möregårdh	8	8	11	11	10	11	11
8	(Germany) Timo Boll	11	11	6	8	12	8	5

Final
1	(China) Fan Zhendong	11	11	11	11
(Sweden) Truls Möregårdh	6	9	7	8

=== Top half ===
==== Section 1 ====
First round
(Belarus) Platonov	7	11	10	11	7	12	8
(Iran) Hodaei	11	9	12	9	11	10	11
(England) Walker	11	11	11	8	11
(Puerto Rico) González	8	4	8	11	4
(Uzbekistan) Kenjaev	11	2	6	6	10
32	(France) Lebesson	6	11	11	11	12
21	(Austria) Gardos	13	11	8	6	11	8	13
(Denmark) Lind	11	8	11	11	5	11	11
(Japan) Togami	11	11	11	11	11
(Czech Republic) Polanský	4	7	13	8	7
(Egypt) K. Assar	2	4	8	9
(Hungary) Szudi	11	11	11	11
(Belgium) Lambiet	8	7	10	9
12	(China) Wang	11	11	12	11

Second round
1	(China) Fan	11	11	11	12
(Iran) Hodaei	1	1	3	10
(England) Walker	4	13	6	11	8	6
32	(France) Lebesson	11	11	11	5	11	11
21	(Austria) Gardos	8	13	8	11	8
(Japan) Togami	11	15	11	4	11
(Hungary) Szudi	5	4	2	2
12	(China) Wang	11	11	11	11

Third round
1	(China) Fan	11	11	11	11
32	(France) Lebesson	6	8	9	9
(Japan) Togami	7	10	5	4
12	(China) Wang	11	12	11	11

Fourth round
1	(China) Fan	11	11	11	11	8	11
12	(China) Wang	5	7	13	7	11	6

==== Section 2 ====
First round
15	(Japan) Niwa	11	11	11	11
(Hungary) Ecseki	7	9	7	4
(Austria) Habesohn	11	8	6	11	11	11
(Portugal) Apolónia	7	11	11	8	7	7
(Slovenia) Kožul	13	1	4	11
(Japan) Morizono	15	11	11	13
(Ukraine) Pryshchepa	11	0	3	12	4	3
17	(Hong Kong) Wong	6	11	11	10	11	11
27	(Croatia) Pucar	11	11	7	4	9	12	11
(South Korea) Hwang	9	9	11	11	11	10	8
(India) Anthony	6	11	11	8	12	9	6
(Nigeria) Abiodun	11	5	5	11	10	11	11
(Sweden) Källberg	11	11	11	11
(Czech Republic) Jančařík	6	4	2	5

Second round
15	(Japan) Niwa	8	11	11	15	9	4
(Austria) Habesohn	11	9	5	17	11	11
(Japan) Morizono	8	7	4	11	8
17	(Hong Kong) Wong	11	11	11	6	11
27	(Croatia) Pucar	11	11	11	11
(Nigeria) Abiodun	7	6	8	6
(Sweden) Källberg	7	11	6	9	14	15	4
5	(China) Lin	11	9	11	11	12	13	11

Third round
(Austria) Habesohn	8	10	6	11	7
17	(Hong Kong) Wong	11	12	11	3	11
27	(Croatia) Pucar	3	7	6	6
5	(China) Lin	11	11	11	11

Fourth round
17	(Hong Kong) Wong	6	8	10	11	7
5	(China) Lin	11	11	12	7	11

==== Section 3 ====
First round
(Japan) Uda	6	9	1	11	9
(Germany) Qiu	11	11	11	5	11
(India) Desai	9	7	7	4
(Germany) Duda	11	11	11	11
(England) Drinkhall	12	5	10	3	9
19	(Portugal) Freitas	10	11	12	11	11
26	(Denmark) Groth	12	11	8	11	11
(Hong Kong) Lam	10	7	11	8	5
(United States) Kumar	7	12	6	11	7	11	10
(Brazil) Monteiro	11	10	11	8	11	9	12
(Italy) Bobocica	11	6	10	7	11	11	9
(Spain) Robles	7	11	12	11	9	8	11
(Ukraine) Kou	7	13	6	7	11	11
11	(England) Pitchford	11	11	11	11	7	13

Second round
6	(China) Liang	9	14	11	9	11	5	11
(Germany) Qiu	11	12	5	11	5	11	6
(Germany) Duda	11	11	11	9	11
19	(Portugal) Freitas	9	9	9	11	4
26	(Denmark) Groth	11	11	14	11
(Brazil) Monteiro	6	3	12	7
(Spain) Robles	4	6	8	12	9
11	(England) Pitchford	11	11	11	10	11

Third round
6	(China) Liang	11	11	3	11	11
(Germany) Duda	8	9	11	9	6
26	(Denmark) Groth	13	11	7	7	11	9
11	(England) Pitchford	11	13	11	11	7	11

Fourth round
6	(China) Liang	14	11	9	11	7	3	11
11	(England) Pitchford	12	6	11	6	11	11	4

==== Section 4 ====
First round
9	(South Korea) Jang	8	11	17	8	5	11	10
(Russia) Skachkov	11	7	15	11	11	9	12
(Thailand) Tanviriyavechakul	10	8	10	11
(Romania) Pletea	12	11	12	13
(Brazil) Jouti	10	7	10	8
(Hungary) Lakatos	12	11	12	11
(Serbia) Karakašević	7	6	5	9
18	(Slovenia) Jorgić	11	11	11	11
24	(India) Achanta	13	5	6	7	9
(Belgium) Nuytinck	11	11	11	11	11
(Chinese Taipei) Liao	9	11	4	3	2
(Iran) No Alamian	11	6	11	11	11
(Portugal) Monteiro	10	11	15	11	8	12	11
(Puerto Rico) Afanador	11	7	13	3	11	14	8

Second round
(Russia) Skachkov	11	6	9	11	11	11
(Romania) Pletea	9	11	11	7	7	5
(Hungary) Lakatos	6	7	8	3
18	(Slovenia) Jorgić	11	11	11	11
(Belgium) Nuytinck	11	10	11	11	11
(Iran) No Alamian	8	12	8	6	9
(Portugal) Monteiro	11	4	5	2	6
3	(Brazil) Calderano	8	11	11	11	11

Third round
(Russia) Skachkov	12	7	11	6	11	5
18	(Slovenia) Jorgić	14	11	7	11	4	11
(Belgium) Nuytinck	6	8	11	11	7	11	5
3	(Brazil) Calderano	11	11	6	8	11	7	11

Fourth round
18	(Slovenia) Jorgić	11	6	3	11	2
3	(Brazil) Calderano	8	11	11	13	11

=== Bottom half ===
==== Section 5 ====
First round
(Sweden) Persson	11	11	11	10	10	11
(Senegal) Diaw	9	6	4	12	12	2
(Argentina) Alto	11	12	11	11
(United States) Zhang	3	10	4	5
(South Korea) Lim	11	11	11	11	11
23	(Egypt) O. Assar	9	13	4	8	7
20	(Chinese Taipei) Chuang	11	11	12	11
(Austria) Serdaroglu	3	7	10	6
(Sweden) Möregårdh	11	12	11	14
(Egypt) Saleh	3	10	5	12
(Canada) Hazin	16	11	11	7	11
(Paraguay) Aguirre	14	7	5	11	8
(Slovakia) Pištej	7	5	6	6
10	(Germany) Franziska	11	11	11	11

Second round
4	(Chinese Taipei) Lin Y-j	11	11	11	11
(Sweden) Persson	5	7	8	7
(Argentina) Alto	9	14	6	4	8
(South Korea) Lim	11	12	11	11	11
20	(Chinese Taipei) Chuang	12	10	5	7	11	11	8
(Sweden) Möregårdh	10	12	11	11	3	3	11
(Canada) Hazin	5	3	5	7
10	(Germany) Franziska	11	11	11	11

Third round
4	(Chinese Taipei) Lin Y-j	9	8	11	5	11	11	11
(South Korea) Lim	11	11	8	11	6	8	13
(Sweden) Möregårdh	3	11	11	11	9	10	13
10	(Germany) Franziska	11	7	8	6	11	12	11

Fourth round
(South Korea) Lim	11	15	11	8	2	5	6
(Sweden) Möregårdh	6	13	9	11	11	11	11

==== Section 6 ====
First round
13	(Nigeria) Aruna	14	11	11	11
(Belarus) Khanin	12	6	6	5
(Chile) Lamadrid	5	8	11	8	12
(Brazil) Ishiy	11	11	9	11	14
(Ecuador) Miño
(Russia) Sidorenko	w/o
(Ukraine) Zhmudenko	2	9	4	3
30	(India) Gnanasekaran	11	11	11	11
22	(Sweden) Karlsson	11	9	11	7	11	5	11
(Hong Kong) Ho	6	11	8	11	7	11	5
(Poland) Badowski	11	11	6	11	11
(Chinese Taipei) Chen	5	6	11	4	8
(France) Cassin	11	4	11	11	12
(Mexico) Madrid	8	11	6	4	10

Second round
13	(Nigeria) Aruna	6	11	11	11	3	11
(Brazil) Ishiy	11	6	6	5	11	7
(Russia) Sidorenko	9	9	8	6
30	(India) Gnanasekaran	11	11	11	11
22	(Sweden) Karlsson	9	7	16	11	11	11
(Poland) Badowski	11	11	14	7	6	0
(France) Cassin	7	6	11	17	12	8	11
7	(Sweden) Falck	11	11	5	15	10	11	7

Third round
13	(Nigeria) Aruna	11	7	13	11	4	11	11
30	(India) Gnanasekaran	9	11	15	3	11	9	7
22	(Sweden) Karlsson	5	12	11	11	7	11
(France) Cassin	11	10	7	8	11	3

Fourth round
13	(Nigeria) Aruna	11	5	13	5	6	11	11
22	(Sweden) Karlsson	9	11	11	11	11	8	6

==== Section 7 ====
First round
(Italy) Stoyanov	11	10	6	8
(China) Zhou	13	12	11	11
(Italy) Mutti	8	9	11	4	6
(Singapore) Pang	11	11	8	11	11
(Nigeria) Omotayo	10	10	8	6
31	(Brazil) Tsuboi	12	12	11	11
28	(Slovakia) Wang	11	11	11	11
(Romania) Ionescu	8	7	5	2
(Belgium) Devos	7	11	13	9	9	11	7
(Finland) Oláh	11	4	11	11	11	9	11
(Portugal) Geraldo	7	13	12	11	11	11
(Hungary) Majoros	11	11	14	5	7	8
(Argentina) Cifuentes	7	6	10	12	7
14	(France) Gauzy	11	11	12	10	11

Second round
8	(Germany) Boll	11	11	11	5	12
(China) Zhou	8	6	8	11	10
(Singapore) Pang	8	11	11	13	9	11
31	(Brazil) Tsuboi	11	7	7	11	11	8
28	(Slovakia) Wang	11	10	11	9	11	11
(Finland) Oláh	4	12	7	11	6	9
(Portugal) Geraldo	11	9	11	4	11	11	7
14	(France) Gauzy	9	11	9	11	8	13	11

Third round
8	(Germany) Boll	11	11	11	11
(Singapore) Pang	4	7	5	5
28	(Slovakia) Wang	7	11	11	11	11	11
14	(France) Gauzy	11	13	9	7	9	9

Fourth round
8	(Germany) Boll	w/o
28	(Slovakia) Wang

==== Section 8 ====
First round
16	(South Korea) Lee	11	11	12	11
(Greece) Sgouropoulos	4	3	10	7
(Romania) Sipos	5	4	9	9
(Belgium) Allegro	11	11	11	11
(Chinese Taipei) Feng	11	11	8	5	16	11	7
(Croatia) Gaćina	7	5	11	11	18	9	11
(South Korea) An	9	12	11	8	9	11	7
25	(United States) Jha	11	10	5	11	11	5	11
29	(Germany) Filus	14	11	11	11
(Romania) Szőcs	12	4	6	2
(France) Akkuzu	11	11	11	9	11
(Algeria) Kherouf	4	7	5	11	4
(Croatia) Kojić	11	9	6	0	11	6
(Poland) Dyjas	7	11	11	11	7	11

Second round
16	(South Korea) Lee	8	5	9	8
(Belgium) Allegro	11	11	11	11
(Croatia) Gaćina	5	9	9	10
25	(United States) Jha	11	11	11	12
29	(Germany) Filus	11	11	11	11
(France) Akkuzu	5	6	8	7
(Poland) Dyjas	7	11	7	11	6	11	11
2	(Japan) Harimoto	11	5	11	6	11	8	9

Third round
(Belgium) Allegro	7	11	13	7	9	6
25	(United States) Jha	11	6	11	11	11	11
29	(Germany) Filus	14	11	11	11
(Poland) Dyjas	12	4	6	2

Fourth round
25	(United States) Jha	11	11	3	11	11
29	(Germany) Filus	8	8	11	9	2
