= 2019 World Table Tennis Championships – Men's singles =

Men's singles at the 2019 World Table Tennis Championships
- Venue: Hungexpo
- Location: Budapest, Hungary
- Dates: 23–28 April
- Final score: 11–5, 11–7, 7–11, 11–9, 11–5

Medalists
gold medal	Ma Long	China
silver medal	Mattias Falck	Sweden
bronze medal	Liang Jingkun	China
bronze medal	An Jae-hyun	South Korea

The men's singles competition of the 2019 World Table Tennis Championships was held from 23 to 28 April 2019.

Ma Long defended his title by defeating Mattias Falck 11–5, 11–7, 7–11, 11–9, 11–5 in the final.

== Seeds ==
1. (China) Fan Zhendong (fourth round)
2. (China) Xu Xin (third round)
3. (China) Lin Gaoyuan (quarterfinals)
4. (Japan) Tomokazu Harimoto (fourth round)
5. (Germany) Timo Boll (fourth round)
6. (South Korea) Lee Sang-su (fourth round)
7. (Brazil) Hugo Calderano (fourth round)
8. (Japan) Koki Niwa (quarterfinals)
9. (China) Liang Jingkun (semifinals)
10. (South Korea) Jang Woo-jin (quarterfinals)
11. (China) Ma Long (champion)
12. (Germany) Dimitrij Ovtcharov (third round)
13. (Japan) Jun Mizutani (third round)
14. (Hong Kong) Wong Chun Ting (first round)
15. (England) Liam Pitchford (second round)
16. (Sweden) Mattias Falck (final)
17. (Germany) Patrick Franziska (third round)
18. (Belarus) Vladimir Samsonov (third round)
19. (Chinese Taipei) Chuang Chih-yuan (second round)
20. (Chinese Taipei) Lin Yun-ju (second round)
21. (South Korea) Jeoung Young-sik (fourth round)
22. (Nigeria) Quadri Aruna (third round)
23. (Portugal) Marcos Freitas (third round)
24. (India) Sathiyan Gnanasekaran (third round)
25. (Austria) Daniel Habesohn (third round)
26. (Chinese Taipei) Chen Chien-an (first round)
27. (France) Emmanuel Lebesson (third round)
28. (Sweden) Kristian Karlsson (second round)
29. (France) Simon Gauzy (quarterfinals)
30. (France) Tristan Flore (first round)
31. (Denmark) Jonathan Groth (third round)
32. (India) Sharath Kamal (second round)
33. (United States) Kanak Jha (second round)
34. (Romania) Ovidiu Ionescu (first round)
35. (Brazil) Gustavo Tsuboi (first round)
36. (Slovenia) Darko Jorgić (second round)
37. (Slovenia) Bojan Tokič (second round)
38. (Japan) Masataka Morizono (third round)
39. (Greece) Panagiotis Gionis (third round)
40. (Egypt) Omar Assar (first round)
41. (Austria) Robert Gardos (second round)
42. (Japan) Kazuhiro Yoshimura (second round)
43. (Spain) Álvaro Robles (first round)
44. (Slovakia) Ľubomír Pištej (second round)
45. (Kazakhstan) Kirill Gerassimenko (first round)
46. (Portugal) Tiago Apolónia (third round)
47. (Belgium) Cédric Nuytinck (second round)
48. (Portugal) João Monteiro (second round)
49. (Slovakia) Wang Yang (fourth round)
50. (Croatia) Tomislav Pucar (fourth round)
51. (Iran) Nima Alamian (second round)
52. (Austria) Stefan Fegerl (second round)
53. (Czech Republic) Pavel Širůček (second round)
54. (Iran) Noshad Alamian (first round)
55. (Russia) Alexander Shibaev (first round)
56. (France) Can Akkuzu (second round)
57. (Ukraine) Kou Lei (second round)
58. (Sweden) Jon Persson (second round)
59. (Finland) Benedek Oláh (second round)
60. (Italy) Niagol Stoyanov (first round)
61. (Brazil) Eric Jouti (second round)
62. (Russia) Kirill Skachkov (first round)
63. (Czech Republic) Lubomír Jančařík (second round)
64. (Hong Kong) Ho Kwan Kit (first round)

== Draw ==
=== Key ===
- Q = Qualifier
- w/o = Walkover
- w/d = Withdraw
- r = Retired
- DQ = Disqualified

=== Finals ===
Quarterfinals
9	(China) Liang Jingkun	12	10	11	11	9	7	11
8	(Japan) Koki Niwa	10	12	8	4	11	11	5
11	(China) Ma Long	11	11	11	11
3	(China) Lin Gaoyuan	8	9	8	4
(South Korea) An Jae-hyun	12	10	7	11	11	8	12
10	(South Korea) Jang Woo-jin	10	12	11	3	5	11	10
16	(Sweden) Mattias Falck	11	11	11	11	11
29	(France) Simon Gauzy	8	13	6	3	7

Semifinals
9	(China) Liang Jingkun	8	11	9	9	12
11	(China) Ma Long	11	6	11	11	14
(South Korea) An Jae-hyun	11	7	11	4	9	11	5
16	(Sweden) Mattias Falck	8	11	3	11	11	2	11

Final
11	(China) Ma Long	11	11	7	11	11
16	(Sweden) Mattias Falck	5	7	11	9	5

=== Top half ===
==== Section 1 ====
First round
1	(China) Fan	11	11	11	12
(Croatia) Kojić	6	5	6	10
(Ukraine) Pryshchepa	6	7	12	12	7	8
48	(Portugal) Monteiro	11	11	10	10	11	11
51	(Iran) Ni. Alamian	11	11	11	12
(Netherlands) Oostwouder	8	5	3	10
(Belgium) Lambiet	8	9	7	5
22	(Nigeria) Aruna	11	11	11	11
20	(Chinese Taipei) Lin	12	11	11	12
(Germany) Qiu	10	7	9	10
(Romania) Szőcs	11	3	11	8	6
39	(Greece) Gionis	5	11	13	11	11
57	(Ukraine) Kou	11	11	11	11
(Belarus) Yarashenka	7	4	5	5
(Thailand) Wisutmaythangkoon	4	8	1	3
9	(China) Liang	11	11	11	11

Second round
1	(China) Fan	11	11	11	11
48	(Portugal) Monteiro	6	7	2	8
51	(Iran) Ni. Alamian	11	10	11	11	5	13	10
22	(Nigeria) Aruna	9	12	13	8	11	11	12
20	(Chinese Taipei) Lin	5	11	11	11	7	6	9
39	(Greece) Gionis	11	8	6	8	11	11	11
57	(Ukraine) Kou	11	5	11	9	5
9	(China) Liang	13	11	8	11	11

Third round
1	(China) Fan	12	11	11	11
22	(Nigeria) Aruna	10	2	6	9
39	(Greece) Gionis	2	11	7	9	4
9	(China) Liang	11	9	11	11	11

Fourth round
1	(China) Fan	11	4	8	9	11	7
9	(China) Liang	5	11	11	11	8	11

==== Section 2 ====
First round
12	(Germany) Ovtcharov	11	11	11	15
(Israel) Tauber	5	8	13	8
(Slovenia) Kožul	11	11	5	11	13
54	(Iran) No. Alamian	8	8	11	9	11
50	(Croatia) Pucar	8	12	5	11	11	10	11
(Germany) Steger	11	10	11	4	8	12	7
(Uzbekistan) Kenjaev	6	3	6	4
32	(India) Kamal	11	11	11	11
28	(Sweden) Karlsson	7	11	6	11	8	11	11
(Scotland) Rumgay	11	8	11	5	11	6	4
(Poland) Dyjas	12	10	11	14	10	11	11
55	(Russia) Shibaev	10	12	5	16	12	5	9
43	(Spain) Robles	11	10	6	13	11	7
(England) Drinkhall	13	12	11	11	7	11
(Paraguay) Aguirre	12	9	10	1	9
8	(Japan) Niwa	10	11	12	11	11

Second round
12	(Germany) Ovtcharov	4	11	11	8	11	12
(Slovenia) Kožul	11	8	9	11	7	10
50	(Croatia) Pucar	11	12	8	11	11
32	(India) Kamal	9	10	11	4	9
28	(Sweden) Karlsson	11	9	8	6	7
(Poland) Dyjas	7	11	11	11	11
(England) Drinkhall	4	13	5	9
8	(Japan) Niwa	11	15	11	11

Third round
12	(Germany) Ovtcharov	9	11	8	11	11	5	7
50	(Croatia) Pucar	11	8	11	8	2	11	11
(Poland) Dyjas	7	8	9	11	12
8	(Japan) Niwa	11	11	11	1	14

Fourth round
50	(Croatia) Pucar	10	5	11	8	11	10
8	(Japan) Niwa	12	11	5	11	8	12

==== Section 3 ====
First round
7	(Brazil) Calderano	11	9	15	11	7	11
(Argentina) Cifuentes	6	11	13	7	11	1
(England) Jarvis	5	11	7	4	5
42	(Japan) Yoshimura	11	8	11	11	11
35	(Brazil) Tsuboi	5	8	7	5
(Romania) Pletea	11	11	11	11
(Belgium) Devos	5	6	10	7
24	(India) Gnanasekaran	11	11	12	11
18	(Belarus) Samsonov	11	11	11	11
(Australia) Heming	4	7	4	3
(Saudi Arabia) Al-Jadai	11	10	7	11	5
47	(Belgium) Nuytinck	8	12	11	13	11
33	(United States) Jha	11	11	12	13	11
(Italy) Bobocica	8	7	14	11	5
(Serbia) Karakašević	6	4	6	3
11	(China) Ma	11	11	11	11

Second round
7	(Brazil) Calderano	11	14	7	10	11	11
42	(Japan) Yoshimura	8	12	11	12	5	8
(Romania) Pletea	5	9	11	7	6
24	(India) Gnanasekaran	11	11	6	11	11
18	(Belarus) Samsonov	11	11	11	11
47	(Belgium) Nuytinck	5	9	2	9
33	(United States) Jha	11	6	7	12	6
11	(China) Ma	8	11	11	14	11

Third round
7	(Brazil) Calderano	11	11	11	11
24	(India) Gnanasekaran	6	3	9	9
18	(Belarus) Samsonov	6	11	6	3	8
11	(China) Ma	11	7	11	11	11

Fourth round
7	(Brazil) Calderano	11	8	1	3	8
11	(China) Ma	8	11	11	11	11

==== Section 4 ====
First round
13	(Japan) Mizutani	11	7	11	11	11
(Cuba) Pereira	8	11	6	8	3
(Brazil) Ishiy	4	7	8	11	10
56	(France) Akkuzu	11	11	11	7	12
59	(Finland) Oláh	11	10	10	11	11	11
(Saudi Arabia) Al-Khadrawi	4	12	12	4	5	3
(Spain) Cantero	8	6	9	9
21	(South Korea) Jeoung	11	11	11	11
27	(France) Lebesson	5	11	9	11	8	11	11
(Belarus) Platonov	11	8	11	7	11	8	6
(Chinese Taipei) Wang	10	11	5	11	11	11
45	(Kazakhstan) Gerassimenko	12	8	11	6	4	9
37	(Slovenia) Tokič	11	11	11	11
(Serbia) Peto	4	7	5	9
(Greece) Sgouropoulos	9	11	8	5	8
3	(China) Lin	11	7	11	11	11

Second round
13	(Japan) Mizutani	11	8	11	12	7	11
56	(France) Akkuzu	6	11	6	10	11	8
59	(Finland) Oláh	8	7	5	11	8
21	(South Korea) Jeoung	11	11	11	6	11
27	(France) Lebesson	12	7	13	7	11	11	11
(Chinese Taipei) Wang	14	11	11	11	5	6	8
37	(Slovenia) Tokič	8	9	10	7
3	(China) Lin	11	11	12	11

Third round
13	(Japan) Mizutani	11	11	9	4	4	11	8
21	(South Korea) Jeoung	7	5	11	11	11	8	11
27	(France) Lebesson	4	5	11	2	7
3	(China) Lin	11	11	7	11	11

Fourth round
21	(South Korea) Jeoung	8	9	9	6
3	(China) Lin	11	11	11	11

=== Bottom half ===
==== Section 5 ====
First round
4	(Japan) Harimoto	8	11	11	11	11
(Poland) Badowski	11	4	6	5	6
(England) Walker	1	9	9	11	11	9
58	(Sweden) Persson	11	11	11	3	8	11
60	(Italy) Stoyanov	8	4	8	11	11	9
(Mexico) Madrid	11	11	11	6	2	11
(Brazil) Monteiro	10	10	11	11	8
23	(Portugal) Freitas	12	12	9	13	11
25	(Austria) Habesohn	12	11	11	10	11
(Belgium) Allegro	10	9	6	12	4
(Chile) Olivares	11	11	11	5	8	9
61	(Brazil) Jouti	8	13	9	11	11	11
64	(Hong Kong) Ho	5	10	9	12	11	9
(Sweden) Möregårdh	11	12	11	10	9	11
(South Korea) An	11	11	11	11
14	(Hong Kong) Wong	3	5	8	9

Second round
4	(Japan) Harimoto	11	11	11	11
58	(Sweden) Persson	5	7	7	7
(Mexico) Madrid	9	5	6	8
23	(Portugal) Freitas	11	11	11	11
25	(Austria) Habesohn	4	8	3	11	11	11	11
61	(Brazil) Jouti	11	11	11	7	6	7	8
(Sweden) Möregårdh	11	2	13	5	8	8
(South Korea) An	3	11	11	11	11	11

Third round
4	(Japan) Harimoto	11	14	11	11
23	(Portugal) Freitas	8	12	7	7
25	(Austria) Habesohn	12	6	8	14	3	4
(South Korea) An	10	11	11	12	11	11

Fourth round
4	(Japan) Harimoto	7	11	8	7	11	9
(South Korea) An	11	3	11	11	8	11

==== Section 6 ====
First round
10	(South Korea) Jang	11	12	8	11	12
(Hong Kong) Lam	5	10	11	4	10
(Egypt) Saleh	5	11	8	12	11	1
63	(Czech Republic) Jančařík	11	5	11	14	5	11
53	(Czech Republic) Širůček	9	11	6	11	11	6	11
(Hungary) Majoros	11	4	11	9	4	11	9
(Russia) Gadiev	8	9	4	13
31	(Denmark) Groth	11	11	11	15
26	(Chinese Taipei) Chen	13	9	12	11	9	8	8
(Czech Republic) Polanský	11	11	10	7	11	11	11
(United States) Liu	8	8	9	8
38	(Japan) Morizono	11	11	11	11
44	(Slovakia) Pištej	11	11	11	12	11
(Cyprus) Yiangou	13	8	3	10	6
(Croatia) Gaćina	8	11	7	16	11	8
5	(Germany) Boll	11	7	11	18	7	11

Second round
10	(South Korea) Jang	11	14	11	11
63	(Czech Republic) Jančařík	2	12	7	9
53	(Czech Republic) Širůček	9	9	8	7
31	(Denmark) Groth	11	11	11	11
(Czech Republic) Polanský	9	6	6	12	8
38	(Japan) Morizono	11	11	11	10	11
44	(Slovakia) Pištej	5	7	8	2
5	(Germany) Boll	11	11	11	11

Third round
10	(South Korea) Jang	9	13	11	11	11
31	(Denmark) Groth	11	11	7	1	9
38	(Japan) Morizono	3	9	7	8
5	(Germany) Boll	11	11	11	11

Fourth round
10	(South Korea) Jang	w/o
5	(Germany) Boll

==== Section 7 ====
First round
6	(South Korea) Lee	10	8	11	11	11	11
(Austria) Levenko	12	11	5	9	9	5
(Portugal) Geraldo	11	11	8	8	11	11	11
40	(Egypt) Assar	13	8	11	11	7	4	9
34	(Romania) Ionescu	4	10	11	9	7
(Sweden) Källberg	11	12	4	11	11
(Hungary) Lakatos	7	6	9	9
17	(Germany) Franziska	11	11	11	11
19	(Chinese Taipei) Chuang	11	11	11	13
(Hungary) Nándor	8	9	5	11
(Ecuador) Mino	8	9	5	9
46	(Portugal) Apolónia	11	11	11	11
41	(Austria) Gardos	11	11	8	3	11	12	11
(India) Thakkar	13	6	11	11	2	10	6
(Hungary) Szudi	11	8	4	5	5
16	(Sweden) Falck	8	11	11	11	11

Second round
6	(South Korea) Lee	11	11	11	11
(Portugal) Geraldo	5	3	4	9
(Sweden) Källberg	7	11	11	11	8	8
17	(Germany) Franziska	11	9	6	13	11	11
19	(Chinese Taipei) Chuang	11	7	11	11	6	8	8
46	(Portugal) Apolónia	7	11	8	9	11	11	11
41	(Austria) Gardos	5	11	6	9	11	12
16	(Sweden) Falck	11	7	11	11	5	14

Third round
6	(South Korea) Lee	5	12	11	11	11
17	(Germany) Franziska	11	10	9	5	5
46	(Portugal) Apolónia	6	4	5	8
16	(Sweden) Falck	11	11	11	11

Fourth round
6	(South Korea) Lee	13	8	8	5	6
16	(Sweden) Falck	11	11	11	11	11

==== Section 8 ====
First round
15	(England) Pitchford	12	5	11	5	11	9	12
(Puerto Rico) Afanador	10	11	5	11	6	11	10
(Denmark) Lind	9	11	8	4	7
49	(Slovakia) Wang	11	9	11	11	11
36	(Slovenia) Jorgić	11	11	11	11
(Vietnam) Nguyễn	6	4	6	7
(North Korea) An	9	11	11	11	11
30	(France) Flore	11	7	5	5	4
29	(France) Gauzy	11	7	11	11	11
(North Korea) Ham	3	11	5	9	8
(South Korea) Park	11	11	11	11
62	(Russia) Skachkov	7	4	5	7
52	(Austria) Fegerl	11	11	9	11	11
(Chile) Gómez	7	8	11	4	8
(Slovenia) Žibrat	12	5	5	2	6
2	(China) Xu	10	11	11	11	11

Second round
15	(England) Pitchford	3	11	10	6
49	(Slovakia) Wang	11	13	12	11
36	(Slovenia) Jorgić	8	9	3	11	11	5
(North Korea) An	11	11	11	6	8	11
29	(France) Gauzy	14	9	11	11	11	11
(South Korea) Park	16	11	8	9	5	9
52	(Austria) Fegerl	3	3	7	1
2	(China) Xu	11	11	11	11

Third round
49	(Slovakia) Wang	11	11	13	13
(North Korea) An	1	7	11	11
29	(France) Gauzy	11	6	11	11	11	11
2	(China) Xu	8	11	13	6	9	9

Fourth round
49	(Slovakia) Wang	0	5	4	8
29	(France) Gauzy	11	11	11	11
