= 2017 World Table Tennis Championships – Men's singles =

Men's singles at the 2017 World Table Tennis Championships
- Venue: Messe Düsseldorf
- Location: Düsseldorf, Germany
- Dates: 29 May – 5 June
- Final score: 7–11, 11–6, 11–3, 11–8, 5–11, 7–11, 12–10

Medalists
gold medal	Ma Long	China
silver medal	Fan Zhendong	China
bronze medal	Xu Xin	China
bronze medal	Lee Sang-su	South Korea

Ma Long successfully defended his title by defeating Fan Zhendong 7–11, 11–6, 11–3, 11–8, 5–11, 7–11, 12–10 in the final.

== Seeds ==
Matches were best of 7 games in qualification and in the 128-player sized main draw.

1. (China) Ma Long (champion)
2. (China) Fan Zhendong (final)
3. (China) Xu Xin (semifinals)
4. (China) Zhang Jike (third round)
5. (Germany) Dimitrij Ovtcharov (fourth round)
6. (Japan) Jun Mizutani (second round)
7. (Hong Kong) Wong Chun Ting (quarterfinals)
8. (Germany) Timo Boll (quarterfinals)
9. (Chinese Taipei) Chuang Chih-yuan (fourth round)
10. (Japan) Koki Niwa (quarterfinals)
11. (South Korea) Jeoung Young-sik (fourth round)
12. (Belarus) Vladimir Samsonov (fourth round)
13. (France) Simon Gauzy (second round)
14. (Portugal) Marcos Freitas (fourth round)
15. (Japan) Kenta Matsudaira (first round)
16. (Portugal) Tiago Apolónia (first round)
17. (South Korea) Lee Sang-su (semifinals)
18. (Austria) Stefan Fegerl (third round)
19. (Sweden) Kristian Karlsson (first round)
20. (Ukraine) Kou Lei (second round)
21. (Brazil) Hugo Calderano (third round)
22. (Germany) Bastian Steger (second round)
23. (Sweden) Mattias Karlsson (third round)
24. (Japan) Yuto Muramatsu (third round)
25. (Chinese Taipei) Chen Chien-an (second round)
26. (Germany) Ruwen Filus (fourth round)
27. (Russia) Alexander Shibaev (third round)
28. (France) Emmanuel Lebesson (second round)
29. (Greece) Panagiotis Gionis (third round)
30. (Nigeria) Quadri Aruna (second round)
31. (Croatia) Andrej Gaćina (second round)
32. (South Korea) Jang Woo-jin (third round)
33. (China) Lin Gaoyuan (fourth round)
34. (Denmark) Jonathan Groth (third round)
35. (Singapore) Gao Ning (second round)
36. (Sweden) Pär Gerell (second round)
37. (England) Paul Drinkhall (second round)
38. (Germany) Patrick Franziska (second round)
39. (Portugal) João Monteiro (second round)
40. (Germany) Ricardo Walther (second round)
41. (England) Liam Pitchford (first round)
42. (Austria) Robert Gardos (second round)
43. (India) Sharath Kamal (third round)
44. (South Korea) Jeong Sang-eun (fourth round)
45. (Slovenia) Bojan Tokič (second round)
46. (Poland) Jakub Dyjas (second round)
47. (Hong Kong) Jiang Tianyi (second round)
48. (Hong Kong) Ho Kwan Kit (second round)
49. (Poland) Wang Zengyi (second round)
50. (Egypt) Omar Assar (second round)
51. (Slovakia) Wang Yang (second round)
52. (Romania) Adrian Crișan (first round)
53. (Japan) Tomokazu Harimoto (quarterfinals)
54. (Czech Republic) Tomáš Konečný (first round)
55. (Austria) Chen Weixing (second round)
56. (Romania) Ovidiu Ionescu (third round)
57. (Iran) Noshad Alamian (second round)
58. (Portugal) João Geraldo (second round)
59. (Russia) Grigory Vlasov (first round)
60. (Croatia) Tomislav Pucar (first round)
61. (Romania) Hunor Szőcs (third round)
62. (India) Soumyajit Ghosh (first round)
63. (Finland) Benedek Oláh (second round)
64. (South Korea) Cho Seung-min (second round)

== Draw ==
=== Key ===
- Q = Qualifier
- w/o = Walkover
- w/d = Withdraw
- r = Retired
- DQ = Disqualified

=== Finals ===
Quarterfinals
1	(China) Ma Long	11	8	11	5	11	11
8	(Germany) Timo Boll	5	11	4	11	4	9
53	(Japan) Tomokazu Harimoto	9	11	6	8	4
3	(China) Xu Xin	11	6	11	11	11
17	(South Korea) Lee Sang-su	11	10	11	11	11
7	(Hong Kong) Wong Chun Ting	7	12	8	7	5
10	(Japan) Koki Niwa	9	7	9	11	6
2	(China) Fan Zhendong	11	11	11	8	11

Semifinals
1	(China) Ma Long	11	11	11	11
3	(China) Xu Xin	6	9	9	3
17	(South Korea) Lee Sang-su	6	9	6	1
2	(China) Fan Zhendong	11	11	11	11

Final
1	(China) Ma Long	7	11	11	11	5	7	12
2	(China) Fan Zhendong	11	6	3	8	11	11	10

=== Top half ===
==== Section 1 ====
First round
1	(China) Ma	11	11	11	11
(Italy) Bobocica	9	5	5	5
(Sweden) Källberg	8	8	11	11	14	12
62	(India) Ghosh	11	11	5	9	12	10
56	(Romania) Ionescu	11	11	11	11
(Turkey) Menge	1	8	9	7
(Spain) Machado	12	4	6	11	10	11	7
28	(France) Lebesson	10	11	11	2	12	7	11
24	(Japan) Muramatsu	11	11	11	11
(Italy) Stoyanov	9	9	7	3
(Poland) Górak	14	8	7	11	2	11
39	(Portugal) Monteiro	12	11	11	9	11	13
47	(Hong Kong) Jiang	11	11	8	11	11
(Singapore) Poh	4	4	11	5	9
(Czech Republic) Širůček	11	7	9	4	6
9	(Chinese Taipei) Chuang	8	11	11	11	11

Second round
1	(China) Ma	4	11	11	11	8	11
(Sweden) Källberg	11	5	6	4	11	9
56	(Romania) Ionescu	11	12	11	11
28	(France) Lebesson	8	10	9	8
24	(Japan) Muramatsu	11	6	11	9	11	11	11
39	(Portugal) Monteiro	9	11	8	11	9	13	8
47	(Hong Kong) Jiang	4	11	6	5	9
9	(Chinese Taipei) Chuang	11	4	11	11	11

Third round
1	(China) Ma	11	11	9	11	11
56	(Romania) Ionescu	8	7	11	5	5
24	(Japan) Muramatsu	7	1	3	8
9	(Chinese Taipei) Chuang	11	11	11	11

Fourth round
1	(China) Ma	11	13	11	11
9	(Chinese Taipei) Chuang	8	11	1	6

==== Section 2 ====
First round
14	(Portugal) Freitas	11	11	11	9	11
(Greece) Papageorgiou	2	6	8	11	6
(Iran) Ni Alamian	8	13	8	11	12	10	11
41	(England) Pitchford	11	11	11	8	10	12	9
60	(Croatia) Pucar	11	11	9	9	11	10	3
(France) Flore	6	9	11	11	9	12	11
(Netherlands) Tromer	12	11	1	11	10	12	7
25	(Chinese Taipei) Chen	10	5	11	13	12	10	11
32	(South Korea) Jang	11	11	11	11
(Puerto Rico) Afanador	5	9	6	9
(Slovakia) Sereda	3	5	10	4
38	(Germany) Franziska	11	11	12	11
46	(Poland) Dyjas	11	7	8	11	11	11	11
(England) Walker	9	11	11	13	8	4	8
(Scotland) Rumgay	4	4	7	4
8	(Germany) Boll	11	11	11	11

Second round
14	(Portugal) Freitas	11	11	11	11
(Iran) Ni Alamian	6	5	9	6
(France) Flore	15	11	10	7	7	12	11
25	(Chinese Taipei) Chen	13	9	12	11	11	10	6
32	(South Korea) Jang	11	11	11	11
38	(Germany) Franziska	6	5	9	6
46	(Poland) Dyjas	7	8	8	8
8	(Germany) Boll	11	11	11	11

Third round
14	(Portugal) Freitas	11	11	11	6	8	8	12
(France) Flore	4	4	8	11	11	11	10
32	(South Korea) Jang	9	11	10	8	5
8	(Germany) Boll	11	8	12	11	11

Fourth round
14	(Portugal) Freitas	11	7	13	9	6
8	(Germany) Boll	5	11	15	11	11

==== Section 3 ====
First round
6	(Japan) Mizutani	14	11	11	11
(Hong Kong) Lam	12	5	8	7
(Belgium) Nuytinck	8	9	3	7
53	(Japan) Harimoto	11	11	11	11
48	(Hong Kong) Ho	11	11	11	12
(Ecuador) Mino	7	9	9	10
(Chinese Taipei) Liao	11	11	12	9	11
19	(Sweden) K. Karlsson	9	7	10	11	9
22	(Germany) Steger	12	11	7	11	16	8	11
(Chinese Taipei) Lin	10	3	11	9	18	11	5
(Hungary) Lakatos	12	6	14	11	10	11
59	(Russia) Vlasov	10	11	12	5	12	4
63	(Finland) Oláh	11	11	9	11	11
(Serbia) Karakašević	8	6	11	8	5
(Slovakia) Pištej	12	11	12	7	11
11	(South Korea) Jeoung	10	6	10	11	5

Second round
6	(Japan) Mizutani	7	6	10	11	8
53	(Japan) Harimoto	11	11	12	7	11
48	(Hong Kong) Ho	10	11	12	3	7	10
(Chinese Taipei) Liao	12	5	10	11	11	12
22	(Germany) Steger	8	12	11	11	6	9
(Hungary) Lakatos	11	14	8	8	11	11
63	(Finland) Oláh	9	11	13	5	9
(Slovakia) Pištej	11	6	15	11	11

Third round
53	(Japan) Harimoto	11	12	11	12
(Chinese Taipei) Liao	7	10	8	10
(Hungary) Lakatos	5	7	9	7
(Slovakia) Pištej	11	11	11	11

Fourth round
53	(Japan) Harimoto	12	11	11	9	11
(Slovakia) Pištej	10	8	9	11	9

==== Section 4 ====
First round
15	(Japan) Matsudaira	11	13	6	10	11	11	8
(Austria) Habesohn	7	11	11	12	13	7	11
(Belarus) Khanin	4	3	2	4
33	(China) Lin	11	11	11	11
43	(India) Kamal	11	11	6	11	11
(Spain) Cantero	7	9	11	8	8
(Greece) Riniotis	11	3	11	6	6	9
20	(Ukraine) Kou	4	11	4	11	11	11
21	(Brazil) Calderano	11	11	11	11	11
(India) Desai	8	8	5	13	4
(Belgium) Lambiet	8	7	4	11
57	(Iran) No Alamian	11	11	11	13
49	(Poland) Wang Z.	11	11	11	11
(Uzbekistan) Kenjaev	0	0	0	0
(Czech Republic) Polansky	12	9	6	6	19	9
3	(China) Xu	10	11	11	11	17	11

Second round
(Austria) Habesohn	1	2	6	11	4
33	(China) Lin	11	11	11	8	11
43	(India) Kamal	11	11	14	11
20	(Ukraine) Kou	3	9	12	3
21	(Brazil) Calderano	11	11	11	11
57	(Iran) No Alamian	7	8	7	5
49	(Poland) Wang Z.	5	9	7	5
3	(China) Xu	11	11	11	11

Third round
33	(China) Lin	11	11	11	8	11	11
43	(India) Kamal	13	9	7	11	8	4
21	(Brazil) Calderano	10	11	6	3	4
3	(China) Xu	12	7	11	11	11

Fourth round
33	(China) Lin	12	11	6	9	11	6	10
3	(China) Xu	10	9	11	11	7	11	12

=== Bottom half ===
==== Section 5 ====
First round
4	(China) Zhang	11	11	11	11
(Hungary) Nagy	7	7	6	7
(Singapore) Chew	11	4	3	10	11	9
42	(Austria) Gardos	5	11	11	12	7	11
64	(South Korea) Cho	9	11	11	6	15	9	11
(Luxembourg) Mladenovic	11	4	6	11	13	11	8
(Slovenia) Jorgič	9	11	11	5	14	2	5
17	(South Korea) Lee	11	8	4	11	12	11	11
29	(Greece) Gionis	9	13	11	11	16	11
(North Korea) Choe	11	11	5	7	18	7
(Kazakhstan) Gerassimenko	8	11	7	12	11	10	6
51	(Slovakia) Wang Y.	11	7	11	10	6	12	11
54	(Czech Republic) Konečný	5	6	7	11	11
(North Korea) Pak	11	11	11	9	13
(Azerbaijan) Yang	8	5	3	2
12	(Belarus) Samsonov	11	11	11	11

Second round
4	(China) Zhang	11	11	11	11	7	11
42	(Austria) Gardos	6	5	13	9	11	8
64	(South Korea) Cho	10	5	11	6	3
17	(South Korea) Lee	12	11	8	11	11
29	(Greece) Gionis	6	12	5	11	7	12	12
51	(Slovakia) Wang Y.	11	10	11	5	11	10	10
(North Korea) Pak	8	15	9	4	2
12	(Belarus) Samsonov	11	13	11	11	11

Third round
4	(China) Zhang	9	6	13	6	10
17	(South Korea) Lee	11	11	11	11	12
29	(Greece) Gionis	6	5	7	5
12	(Belarus) Samsonov	11	11	11	11

Fourth round
17	(South Korea) Lee	11	11	11	11
12	(Belarus) Samsonov	9	1	3	9

==== Section 6 ====
First round
13	(France) Gauzy	11	11	11	11
(Luxembourg) Glod	8	6	7	6
(Brazil) Tsuboi	11	8	6	11	11	6
44	(South Korea) Jeong	13	11	11	4	8	11
45	(Slovenia) Tokič	5	11	9	11	12	11
(Mexico) Madrid	11	8	11	7	10	6
(Egypt) Lashin	7	4	11	6	9
18	(Austria) Fegerl	11	11	8	11	11
23	(Sweden) M. Karlsson	11	11	11	11
(Nigeria) Toriola	8	6	5	1
(United States) Jha	11	11	5	11	9	11	11
52	(Romania) Crișan	8	8	11	13	11	8	9
50	(Egypt) Assar	6	6	6	12	11	11	11
(Italy) Rech	11	11	11	10	9	9	5
(Russia) Liventsov	11	11	11	11	11	4	8
7	(Hong Kong) Wong	13	8	4	13	9	11	11

Second round
13	(France) Gauzy	11	8	11	9	10	9
44	(South Korea) Jeong	9	11	8	11	12	11
45	(Slovenia) Tokič	6	9	11	11	11	9	8
18	(Austria) Fegerl	11	11	8	8	9	11	11
23	(Sweden) M. Karlsson	11	9	8	11	11	11
(United States) Jha	6	11	11	6	9	7
50	(Egypt) Assar	7	11	6	5	11	4
7	(Hong Kong) Wong	11	7	11	11	7	11

Third round
44	(South Korea) Jeong	12	8	11	9	11	11
18	(Austria) Fegerl	10	11	6	11	5	1
23	(Sweden) M. Karlsson	12	11	5	8	7	14	3
7	(Hong Kong) Wong	10	9	11	11	11	12	11

Fourth round
44	(South Korea) Jeong	7	11	8	11	7
7	(Hong Kong) Wong	11	13	11	6	11

==== Section 7 ====
First round
5	(Germany) Ovtcharov	11	11	6	7	11	13
(Czech Republic) Jančařík	9	5	11	11	5	11
(Brazil) Matsumoto	11	3	1	11	7	7
37	(England) Drinkhall	8	11	11	9	11	11
61	(Romania) Szőcs	11	9	11	11	11
(India) Gnanasekaran	8	11	7	8	8
(France) A. Robinot	7	10	7	7
31	(Croatia) Gaćina	11	12	11	11
30	(Nigeria) Aruna	11	11	11	11
(Chile) Gómez	2	7	5	3
(Egypt) Saleh	5	11	6	6	7
34	(Denmark) Groth	11	9	11	11	11
35	(Singapore) Gao	11	11	11	11
(Israel) Ben Ari	4	8	7	6
(Austria) Levenko	3	8	6	8
10	(Japan) Niwa	11	11	11	11

Second round
5	(Germany) Ovtcharov	11	5	11	11	11
37	(England) Drinkhall	3	11	4	5	5
61	(Romania) Szőcs	11	9	11	9	11	6	11
31	(Croatia) Gaćina	7	11	6	11	7	11	9
30	(Nigeria) Aruna	12	9	5	6
34	(Denmark) Groth	14	11	11	11
35	(Singapore) Gao	11	10	7	8	11	14	4
10	(Japan) Niwa	9	12	11	11	5	12	11

Third round
5	(Germany) Ovtcharov	11	13	9	7	9	11	11
61	(Romania) Szőcs	2	11	11	11	11	2	8
34	(Denmark) Groth	11	11	6	7	8	1
10	(Japan) Niwa	8	9	11	11	11	11

Fourth round
5	(Germany) Ovtcharov	13	9	13	10	5	11	9
10	(Japan) Niwa	11	11	11	12	11	9	11

==== Section 8 ====
First round
16	(Portugal) Apolónia	6	11	14	11	12	12	6
(Hong Kong) Ng	11	8	16	7	10	14	11
(Thailand) Tanviriyavechakul	10	4	11	11	6
55	(Austria) Chen	12	11	7	13	11
58	(Portugal) Geraldo	12	11	11	5	6	6	13
(Spain) Robles	10	7	4	11	11	11	11
(Portugal) Carvalho	7	12	9	11	5	6
26	(Germany) Filus	11	10	11	5	11	11
27	(Russia) Shibaev	12	10	7	11	11	11
(Egypt) El-Beiali	10	11	11	8	5	7
(Croatia) Kojić	6	9	8	11	6
40	(Germany) Walther	11	11	11	8	11
36	(Sweden) Gerell	11	11	11	11
(Belgium) Devos	9	7	5	9
(France) Q. Robinot	6	4	4	1
2	(China) Fan	11	11	11	11

Second round
(Hong Kong) Ng	5	11	9	6	11	11	11
55	(Austria) Chen	11	8	11	11	7	8	9
58	(Portugal) Geraldo	8	11	10	10	9
26	(Germany) Filus	11	7	12	12	11
27	(Russia) Shibaev	7	11	3	11	12	11
40	(Germany) Walther	11	5	11	5	10	7
36	(Sweden) Gerell	3	5	1	8
2	(China) Fan	11	11	11	11

Third round
(Hong Kong) Ng	6	11	5	2	5
26	(Germany) Filus	11	8	11	11	11
27	(Russia) Shibaev	12	4	4	13	7
2	(China) Fan	14	11	11	11	11

Fourth round
26	(Germany) Filus	11	13	7	3	11	3
2	(China) Fan	13	11	11	11	9	11
