= Table tennis at the 2024 Summer Olympics – Men's singles =

Table tennis – men's singles at the Games of the XXXIII Olympiad
- Venue: Paris Expo Porte de Versailles
- Date: 27 July – 4 August
- Competitors: 67 from 46 nations

Medalists
1st place, gold medalist(s)		Fan Zhendong	China
2nd place, silver medalist(s)		Truls Möregårdh	Sweden
3rd place, bronze medalist(s)		Félix Lebrun	France

The men's singles table tennis event was part of the table tennis programme at the 2024 Summer Olympics in Paris. The event took place from 27 July to 4 August 2024 at Paris Expo Porte de Versailles.

== Schedule ==
Legend
P	Preliminary round	¼	Quarter-finals	½	Semi-finals	F	Final

Sat 27	Sun 28	Mon 29	Tue 30	Wed 31	Thu 1	Fri 2	Sun 4
P					¼	½	F

== Seeds ==
Since there were more than 64 athletes, seeded players 1 to 32 were drawn directly to the top position in round of 64. Seeded players 33 to 48 were drawn in the remaining position of round of 64. The draw was held on 24 July 2024.

1. Wang Chuqin (CHN) (second round)
2. Fan Zhendong (CHN) (champion, gold medalist)
3. Félix Lebrun (FRA) (semifinals, bronze medalist)
4. Hugo Calderano (BRA) (semifinals, fourth place)
5. Lin Yun-ju (TPE) (quarterfinals)
6. Tomokazu Harimoto (JPN) (quarterfinals)
7. Dang Qiu (GER) (second round)
8. Jang Woo-jin (KOR) (quarterfinals)
9. Dimitrij Ovtcharov (GER) (round of 16)
10. Shunsuke Togami (JPN) (round of 16)
11. Alexis Lebrun (FRA) (round of 16)
12. Marcos Freitas (POR) (first round)
13. Darko Jorgić (SLO) (round of 16)
14. Quadri Aruna (NGR) (first round)
15. Cho Dae-seong (KOR) (first round)
16. Omar Assar (EGY) (quarterfinals)
17. Jonathan Groth (DEN) (second round)
18. Anton Källberg (SWE) (second round)
19. Truls Möregårdh (SWE) (final, silver medalist)
20. Kao Cheng-jui (TPE) (round of 16)
21. Álvaro Robles (ESP) (second round)
22. Edward Ly (CAN) (first round)
23. Nicholas Lum (AUS) (first round)
24. Sharath Kamal Achanta (IND) (first round)
25. Liam Pitchford (GBR) (second round)
26. Finn Luu (AUS) (first round)
27. Ovidiu Ionescu (ROU) (first round)
28. Kirill Gerassimenko (KAZ) (round of 16)
29. Mohamed El-Beiali (EGY) (first round)
30. Wong Chun Ting (HKG) (second round)
31. Noshad Alamian (IRI) (second round)
32. Tomislav Pucar (CRO) (second round)
33. Andy Pereira (CUB) (first round)
34. Nicolás Burgos (CHI) (first round)
35. Anders Lind (DEN) (round of 16)
36. Daniel Habesohn (AUT) (first round)
37. Tiago Apolónia (POR) (first round)
38. Andrej Gaćina (CRO) (second round)
39. Wang Yang (SVK) (first round)
40. Eduard Ionescu (ROU) (second round)
41. Miłosz Redzimski (POL) (second round)
42. Brian Afanador (PUR) (first round)
43. Alberto Miño (ECU) (second round)
44. Martin Allegro (BEL) (first round)
45. Santiago Lorenzo (ARG) (first round)
46. Marcos Madrid (MEX) (first round)
47. Izaac Quek (SGP) (first round)
48. Vitor Ishiy (BRA) (second round)

The 49 to 64 seeded players were allocated into the top place of preliminary round. If they were drawn with no opponent in preliminary round, they got a bye and advanced to round of 64.

49. Harmeet Desai (IND) (first round)
50. Daniel González (PUR) (first round)
51. Ibrahima Diaw (SEN) (first round)
52. Luka Mladenovic (LUX) (first round)
53. Cedric Nuytinck (BEL) (first round)
54. Olajide Omotayo (NGR) (first round)
55. Eugene Wang (CAN) (first round)
56. Panagiotis Gionis (GRE) (second round)
57. Mehdi Bouloussa (ALG) (first round)
58. Saheed Idowu (CGO) (first round)
59. Kanak Jha (USA) (round of 16)
60. Deni Kožul (SLO) (second round)
61. Fabio Rakotoarimanana (MAD) (first round)
62. Yaroslav Zhmudenko (UKR) (first round)
63. Nima Alamian (IRI) (first round)
64. Vicky Wu (FIJ) (first round)

The 65 to 67 seeded players were allocated into the bottom place of preliminary round:

65. Vladislav Ursu (MDA) (preliminary round)
66. Zaid Abo Yaman (JOR) (preliminary round)
67. Santoo Shrestha (NEP) (preliminary round)

== Draw ==
=== Finals ===
Semifinals
19	Truls Möregårdh (SWE)	12	16	7	11	10	11
4	Hugo Calderano (BRA)	10	14	11	7	12	8
3	Félix Lebrun (FRA)	8	6	7	5
2	Fan Zhendong (CHN)	11	11	11	11

Gold medal match
19	Truls Möregårdh (SWE)	11	9	9	8	8
2	Fan Zhendong (CHN)	7	11	11	11	11
Bronze medal match
4	Hugo Calderano (BRA)	6	10	7	6
3	Félix Lebrun (FRA)	11	12	11	11

=== Top half ===
==== Section 1 ====
Round of 64
1	Wang C.Q. (CHN)	7	11	11	11	11
39	Y. Wang (SVK)	11	3	4	9	4
53	C. Nuytinck (BEL)	4	9	9	4
19	T. Möregårdh (SWE)	11	11	11	11
20	Kao C.J. (TPE)	11	11	9	11	11
63	Ni. Alamian (IRI)	7	2	11	5	4
40	E. Ionescu (ROU)	8	9	6	11	12	11	13
14	Q. Aruna (NGR)	11	11	11	8	10	9	11
16	O. Assar (EGY)	11	11	7	11	11
61	F. Rakotoarimanana (MAD)	6	6	11	5	8
43	A. Miño (ECU)	9	9	9	11	11	11	11
26	F. Luu (AUS)	11	11	11	9	7	4	8
28	K. Gerassimenko (KAZ)	11	11	12	11
34	N. Burgos (CHI)	4	5	10	6
37	T. Apolónia (POR)	11	3	2	6	10
7	D. Qiu (GER)	2	11	11	11	12

Round of 32
1	Wang C.Q. (CHN)	10	7	11	11	9	6
19	T. Möregårdh (SWE)	12	11	5	7	11	11
20	Kao C.J. (TPE)	13	11	8	11	11
40	E. Ionescu (ROU)	11	5	11	6	7
16	O. Assar (EGY)	11	13	11	11
43	A. Miño (ECU)	5	11	3	2
28	K. Gerassimenko (KAZ)	6	11	11	5	11	11	11
7	D. Qiu (GER)	11	6	13	11	5	9	6

Round of 16
19	T. Möregårdh (SWE)	14	13	11	12	11
20	Kao C.J. (TPE)	16	11	8	10	6
16	O. Assar (EGY)	8	6	12	12	11	11
28	K. Gerassimenko (KAZ)	11	11	10	10	9	3

Quarterfinals
19	T. Möregårdh (SWE)	11	6	14	14	11
16	O. Assar (EGY)	7	11	12	12	2

==== Section 2 ====
Round of 64
8	Jang W.J. (KOR)	11	11	11	8	11
50	D. González (PUR)	7	5	6	11	7
52	L. Mladenovic (LUX)	11	4	9	5
17	J. Groth (DEN)	13	11	11	11
24	S. Achanta (IND)	12	9	6	7	11	10
60	D. Kožul (SLO)	10	11	11	11	8	12
55	E. Wang (CAN)	3	6	7	11
10	S. Togami (JPN)	11	11	11	13
11	A. Lebrun (FRA)	11	11	11	11
54	S. Lorenzo (ARG)	6	5	6	6
57	M. Bouloussa (ALG)	3	7	5	10
32	T. Pucar (CRO)	11	11	11	12
21	Á. Robles (ESP)	11	14	11	9	11	11
36	D. Habesohn (AUT)	6	16	9	11	7	9
33	A. Pereira (CUB)	8	7	9	4
4	H. Calderano (BRA)	11	11	11	11

Round of 32
8	Jang W.J. (KOR)	10	11	11	11	11
17	J. Groth (DEN)	12	3	8	3	9
60	D. Kožul (SLO)	11	4	11	7	3	5
10	S. Togami (JPN)	9	11	8	11	11	11
11	A. Lebrun (FRA)	11	11	11	11
32	T. Pucar (CRO)	9	3	6	9
21	Á. Robles (ESP)	11	11	9	11	3	5
4	H. Calderano (BRA)	7	13	11	8	11	11

Round of 16
8	Jang W.J. (KOR)	11	18	12	11
10	S. Togami (JPN)	7	16	10	9
11	A. Lebrun (FRA)	11	5	6	3	8
4	H. Calderano (BRA)	3	11	11	11	11

Quarterfinals
8	Jang W.J. (KOR)	4	7	5	6
4	H. Calderano (BRA)	11	11	11	11

=== Bottom half ===
==== Section 3 ====
Round of 64
3	F. Lebrun (FRA)	11	11	11	11
49	H. Desai (IND)	8	8	6	8
58	S. Idowu (CGO)	7	13	4	6	14	11	9
18	A. Källberg (SWE)	11	11	11	11	12	6	11
23	N. Lum (AUS)	7	5	7	6
48	V. Ishiy (BRA)	11	11	11	11
46	M. Madrid (MEX)	3	7	3	5
9	D. Ovtcharov (GER)	11	11	11	11
13	D. Jorgić (SLO)	8	11	11	13	3	11
47	I. Quek (SGP)	11	4	8	11	11	7
64	V. Wu (FIJ)	6	3	3	2
25	L. Pitchford (GBR)	11	11	11	11
27	O. Ionescu (ROU)	8	12	8	10	5
38	A. Gaćina (CRO)	11	10	11	12	11
42	B. Afanador (PUR)	6	14	6	6	2
5	Lin Y.J. (TPE)	11	12	11	11	11

Round of 32
3	F. Lebrun (FRA)	11	11	11	4	13	11
18	A. Källberg (SWE)	4	7	8	11	15	8
48	V. Ishiy (BRA)	4	8	9	13	3
9	D. Ovtcharov (GER)	11	11	11	11	11
13	D. Jorgić (SLO)	11	11	9	11	5	11
25	L. Pitchford (GBR)	9	7	11	6	11	6
38	A. Gaćina (CRO)	4	9	9	6
5	Lin Y.J. (TPE)	11	11	11	11

Round of 16
3	F. Lebrun (FRA)	11	15	12	8	3	8	11
9	D. Ovtcharov (GER)	9	13	10	11	11	11	7
13	D. Jorgić (SLO)	9	10	7	7
5	Lin Y.J. (TPE)	11	12	11	11

Quarterfinals
3	F. Lebrun (FRA)	11	7	11	4	11	8	11
5	Lin Y.J. (TPE)	7	11	8	11	8	11	6

==== Section 4 ====
Round of 64
6	T. Harimoto (JPN)	11	11	11	11
44	M. Allegro (BEL)	3	2	3	5
54	O. Omatoyo (NGR)	11	5	4	10	8
31	No. Alamian (IRI)	6	11	11	12	11
29	M. El-Beiali (EGY)	8	7	14	8
41	M. Redzimski (POL)	11	11	16	11
35	A. Lind (DEN)	11	11	11	11
12	M. Freitas (POR)	9	6	8	4
15	Cho D.S. (KOR)	11	8	2	2	11	10
59	K. Jha (USA)	8	11	11	11	8	12
56	P. Gionis (GRE)	11	11	11	11
22	E. Ly (CAN)	6	8	8	4
30	Wong C.T. (HKG)	7	18	11	6	11	8	11
51	I. Diaw (SEN)	11	16	8	11	0	11	4
62	Y. Zhmudenko (UKR)	6	4	7	2
2	Fan Z.D. (CHN)	11	11	11	11

Round of 32
6	T. Harimoto (JPN)	8	11	11	11	5	11
31	No. Alamian (IRI)	11	6	4	7	11	7
41	M. Redzimski (POL)	10	11	6	11	9	11	6
35	A. Lind (DEN)	12	6	11	6	11	9	11
59	K. Jha (USA)	11	11	11	7	8	11
56	P. Gionis (GRE)	5	4	7	11	11	8
30	Wong C.T. (HKG)	5	5	11	6	3
2	Fan Z.D. (CHN)	11	11	9	11	11

Round of 16
6	T. Harimoto (JPN)	8	12	11	11	11
35	A. Lind (DEN)	11	10	5	8	6
59	K. Jha (USA)	4	7	10	7
2	Fan Z.D. (CHN)	11	11	12	11

Quarterfinals
6	T. Harimoto (JPN)	11	11	4	7	11	7	7
2	Fan Z.D. (CHN)	2	9	11	11	4	11	11

== Preliminary rounds ==
Preliminary round
49	H. Desai (IND)	11	11	11	11
66	Z. Yaman (JOR)	7	9	5	5

Preliminary round
59	K. Jha (USA)	11	11	11	11
65	V. Ursu (MDA)	5	6	5	3

Preliminary round
51	I. Diaw (SEN)	12	11	11	11
67	S. Shrestha (NEP)	10	3	4	5
