= Deni Kožul =

Slovenian table tennis player

Deni Kozul
Personal information
- Born: 13 March 1997 (age 29)
- Height: 180 cm (5 ft 11 in)

Sport
- Sport: Table tennis
- Playing style: Righthanded shakehand grip
- Highest ranking: 80 (1 June 2025)
- Current ranking: 87 (15 July 2025)
Medal record
Men's table tennis
Representing Slovenia
Mediterranean Games
Gold medal – first place	2018 Tarragona	Team
Gold medal – first place	2022 Oran	Team
European Championships
Bronze medal – third place	2017 Luxembourg City	Team
Bronze medal – third place	2025 Zadar	Team

Deni Kozul (born 18 March 1997) is a Slovenian table tennis player.

He represented his country at the Summer Olympics in 2021 (team) and 2024 (singles and team), the European Games in 2019 (team) and 2023 (singles, team and mixed doubles), and the Mediterranean Games in 2018 (singles and team) and 2022 (singles and team).

Kozul competed at the World Championships in 2017 (doubles), 2018 (team), 2019 (singles), 2021 (singles and doubles), 2022 (team), 2023 (singles) and 2024 (team).

He also competed at the European Championships in 2017 (team), 2019 (team), 2021 (team), 2022 (singles and mixed doubles) and 2024 (singles).
