= Liang Jingkun =

Chinese table tennis player

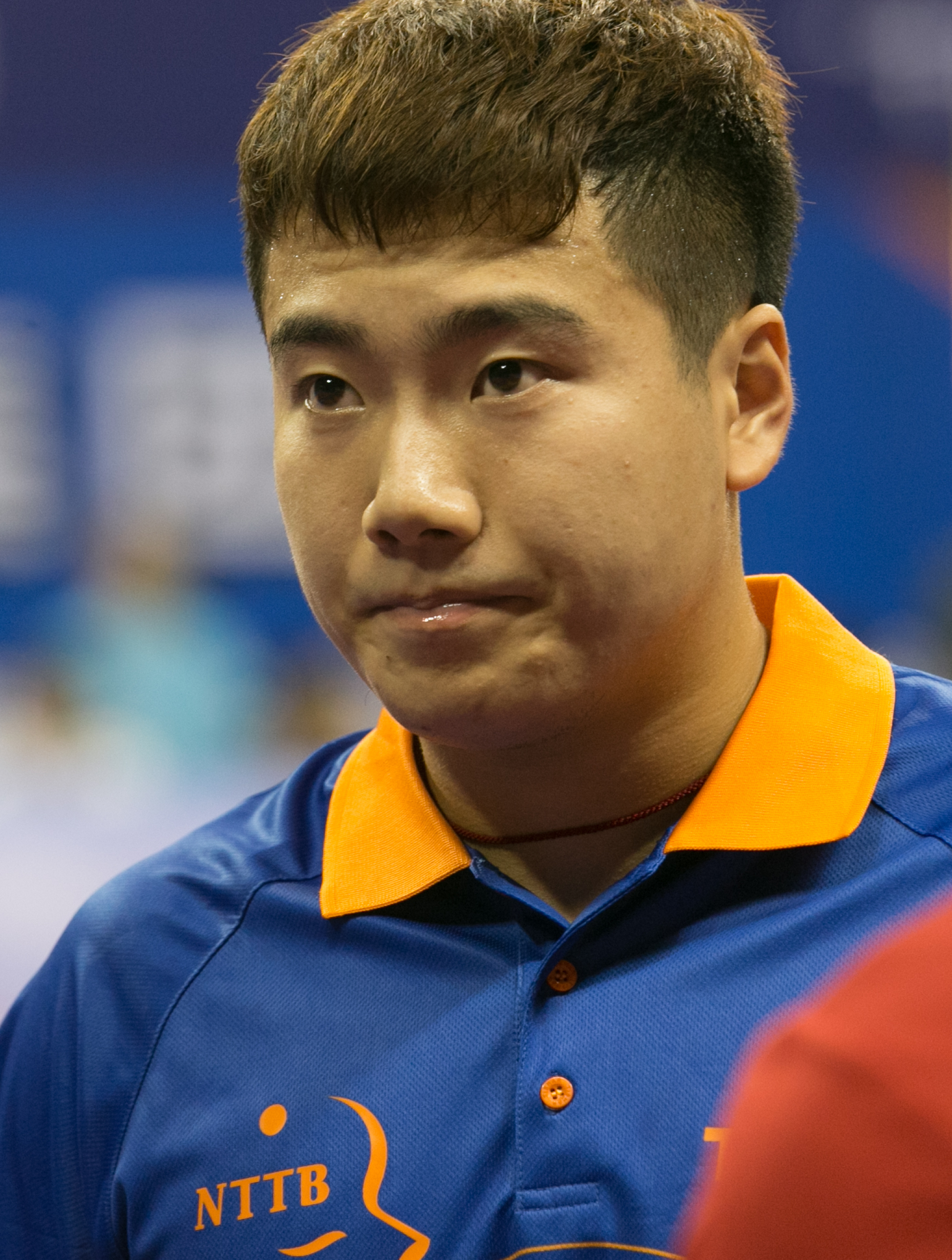
- Liang in 2016

Personal information
- Native name: 梁靖崑
- Born: 20 October 1996 (age 30) Tangshan, China
- Height: 1.74 m (5 ft 9 in)

Sport
- Sport: Table tennis
- Playing style: Right-handed shakehand grip
- Highest ranking: 2 (9 July 2024)
- Current ranking: 30 (2 November 2026)
Medal record
Men's table tennis
Representing China
World Championships
Gold medal – first place	2022 Chengdu	Team
Gold medal – first place	2024 Busan	Team
Gold medal – first place	2026 London	Team
Bronze medal – third place	2019 Budapest	Singles
Bronze medal – third place	2019 Budapest	Doubles
Bronze medal – third place	2021 Houston	Singles
Bronze medal – third place	2021 Houston	Doubles
Bronze medal – third place	2023 Durban	Singles
Bronze medal – third place	2025 Doha	Singles
World Cup
Gold medal – first place	2019 Tokyo	Team
Gold medal – first place	2024 Chengdu	Mixed team
Gold medal – first place	2025 Chengdu	Mixed team
Bronze medal – third place	2025 Macao	Singles
Asian Games
Gold medal – first place	2018 Jakarta	Team
Gold medal – first place	2022 Hangzhou	Team
Asian Championships
Gold medal – first place	2019 Yogyakarta	Doubles
Gold medal – first place	2019 Yogyakarta	Team
Gold medal – first place	2023 Pyeongchang	Team
Gold medal – first place	2024 Astana	Team
Gold medal – first place	2025 Bhubaneswar	Team
Silver medal – second place	2023 Pyeongchang	Mixed doubles
Bronze medal – third place	2023 Pyeongchang	Singles
Asian Cup
Silver medal – second place	2025 Shenzhen	Singles

Liang Jingkun (Chinese: 梁靖崑; pinyin: Liáng Jìngkūn; born 20 October 1996) is a Chinese professional table tennis player. He is a four-time bronze medalist in men's singles at the World Table Tennis Championships.

== Career ==
A top junior player with huge potential, Liang made a breakthrough in 2015 when he was surprisingly selected to represent China at the World Championships. He competed in the men's singles event, where he made it to the round of 32 before getting eliminated by his teammate, Zhang Jike. He also competed in the 2019 World Championships where he surprisingly beat Fan Zhendong in the Round of 16 but ended up losing in the semi-finals to Ma Long.

=== 2021 ===
In May, Liang played in the Chinese Olympic Scrimmages. He lost to Xu Xin 4–0 in the quarter-finals of the second leg of the scrimmage.

In September, Liang reached the semi-finals of the China National Games, where he lost to Fan Zhendong. He then defeated Wang Chuqin to take the bronze medal.

In November, Liang won two WTT titles in Slovenia. He continued to reach semifinals at the 2021 World Championships in both singles and men's doubles.

=== 2022 ===
In March, Liang won WTT Contender title in Muscat by defeating Lin Gaoyuan in the final. He also advanced to semifinals at the WTT Singapore Smash. These results made him reach the third spot of the world ranking on 22 March. In July, Liang lost to Truls Möregårdh and Chuang Chih-yuan respectively in two WTT events held in Budapest.

In October, Liang represented China at the 2022 World Team Championships, but only played two matches in group stage. At the WTT Champions Macao, Liang was drawn to face compatriot Lin Gaoyuan in the first round. He won the match against Lin in the deciding fifth game, but suffered a loss in the next round against Alexis Lebrun. After the match against Lin Gaoyuan, Liang put the racket in his shorts. The controversial celebrations made Chinese Table Tennis Association suspend Liang from any table tennis competitions for the rest of 2022.

== Singles titles ==
Year	Tournament	Final opponent	Score	Ref
2018	ITTF World Tour Platinum, Austrian Open	(China) Xu Xin	4–3	
2019	ITTF Challenge Plus, Portugal Open	(China) Lin Gaoyuan	4–1	
2021	WTT Contender Laško	(Kazakhstan) Kirill Gerassimenko	4–0	
2021	WTT Contender Novo Mesto	(China) Wang Chuqin	4–3	
2022	WTT Contender Muscat	(China) Lin Gaoyuan	4–1	
2023	WTT Star Contender Goa	(China) Lin Shidong	4–2	
2023	WTT Contender Taiyuan	(Japan) Shunsuke Togami	4–3	
2024	WTT Champions Incheon	(Brazil) Hugo Calderano	4–1	
