= Panagiotis Gionis =

Greek table tennis player

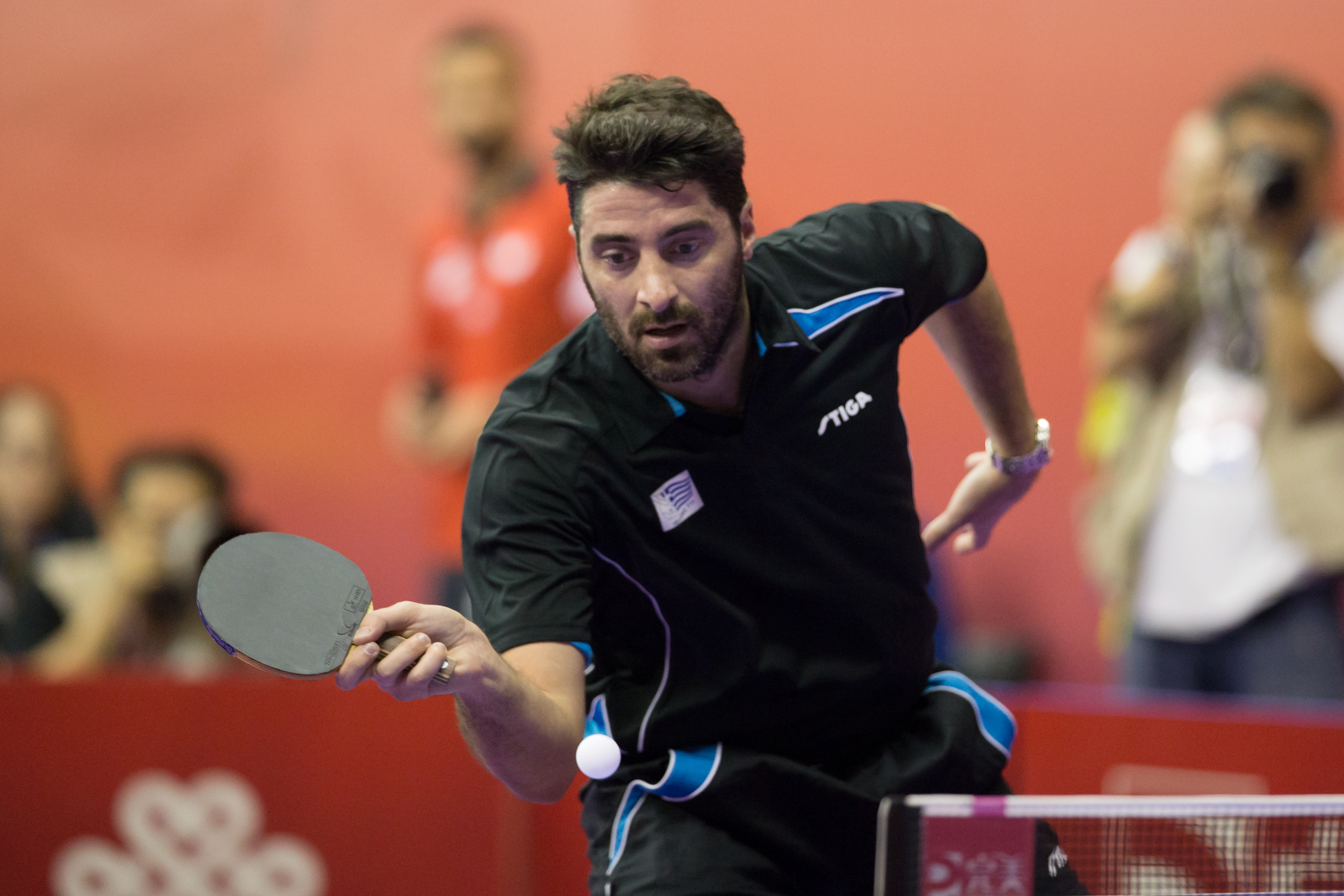
- Gionis in 2016

Personal information
- Full name: Panagiotis Gionis
- Nicknames: Gio, The Defentist
- Nationality: Greece
- Born: 7 January 1980 (age 46) Athens, Greece
- Height: 1.86 m (6 ft 1 in)
- Weight: 85 kg (187 lb)

Sport
- Sport: Table tennis
- Club: (Germany) Borussia Düsseldorf (Greece) Panathinaikos
- Playing style: Shakehand
- Equipment: Butterfly Petr Korbel FL blade; Butterfly Tenergy 05 Hard (Black, FH); Butterfly Feint Long II (Red, BH)
- Highest ranking: 18 (November 2014)
- Current ranking: 192 (28 September 2026)
Medal record
Men's table tennis
Representing Greece
Mediterranean Games
Gold medal – first place	2009 Pescara	Singles
European Championship
Silver medal – second place	2013 Schwechat	Team
Bronze medal – third place	2013 Schwechat	Singles

Panagiotis Gionis (born 7 January 1980) is a Greek table tennis player and a dentist. He is a member in the Greece National Team and has competed in 6 Olympics and many World and European Championships. He has been playing professionally in Germany and France since 2001. Currently, he is playing for Greek club Panathinaikos, German club Borussia Düsseldorf and is being sponsored by TAMASU BUTTERFLY.

== Career ==
In May 2011, he qualified directly for the London 2012 Summer Olympics based on his ITTF world ranking. At the 2012 Summer Olympics, he lost in the third round to Japan's Seiya Kishikawa.

He placed 3rd in the men's single 2013 LIEBHERR European Championships and second in the team event. He is currently ranked 21st in the world and 7th in Europe.

In Aug 2014 he was invited to participate in the mixed European team in the Asia-Europe All Star Challenge on 1–2 November 2014 in Zhang Jia Gang, China. He lost to Chuang Chih-yuan with 0:3.

In April 2016, he secured his spot at the 2016 Summer Olympics by winning the group final match at the ITTF European Olympic Games Qualification Tournament in Halmstad, Sweden. At the 2016 Summer Olympics, he defeated Padasak Tanviriyavechakul of Thailand in the second round. He was defeated by Jun Mizutani of Japan in the third round.

Panagiotis Gionis qualified for the 2017 World Table Tennis Championships seeded at Number 29. In the first round and second round he faced and defeated North Korea's Choe Il (4–2) and Slovakia's Wang Yang (4–3) respectively. Gionis was ultimately defeated in the third round by Number 12 seed, Vladimir Samsonov, (0–4).

In 2021, he participated in the Tokyo Summer Olympics, ultimately losing to Jeong Youngsik in the 3rd round after beating Ahmed Saleh 4–1.

== Achievements ==
- Winner Croatia Open Singles 2018
- Winner Croatia Open Singles 2017
- 6x Olympic Games Participant (2024 Paris, 2020 Tokyo, 2016 Rio, 2012 London, 2008 Beijing, 2004 Athens)
- 16x Participant World Championships 1997–2014
- 15x Participant European Championships 1997–2013
- Finalist European Championships Team 2013
- Bronze Medal European Championships Singles 2013
- Bronze Medal European Champions league (with Angers) 2013
- Bronze Medal ITTF World Tour, Swedish Open Singles 2013
- Bronze Medal European Cup Top 16 Singles 2015
- Round of 16 European Championships Singles 2012
- Round of 16 European Championships Doubles 2012
- Finalist ETTU Cup (with Angers) 2012
- Round of 16 Hungarian Open Singles 2012
- Winner Pescara Mediterranean Games Singles 2009
- Round of 16 World Championships Singles 2009
- Gold medal Belgian Open Championship Singles 2006
- Winner Luxemburg Open Singles 2006
- Winner Luxemburg Open Team 2006
- Bronze Medal Swedish Pro Tour Doubles 2005
- Silver Medal Polish Open Doubles 2004
- Silver Medal Belgian Open Championship 2004
- Bronze Medal Egypt Pro Tour Doubles 2004
- Winner Bulgarian Open 2003
- 6th place World Championship Team 1997
- 1st place in Men's U21 Balkan Championship Doubles 1996
- 1st place in U21 European Championship Singles 1996
- 1st place in U21 Balkan Championship Singles 1996
- 1st place in U15 Balkan Championship Singles 1992

== See also ==
- List of table tennis players
