= Luka Mladenovic (table tennis) =

Luxembourgish table tennis player (born 1998)

Munich, August 14, 2022: European Championships Munich, table tennis mixed doubles Round of 32, Italy vs. Luxembourg. Image shows Luka Mladenovic (LUX).

Luka Mladenovic (born 26 December 1998) is a Luxembourgish table tennis player. Born in Luxembourg to Serbian parents, Mladenovic took up table tennis as a child after health issues made him stop playing football and take up indoor sports. Mladenovic qualified to represent Luxembourg at the 2024 Summer Olympics, but was eliminated in the round of 64 in the men's table tennis tournament by Jonathan Groth. He became the first male table tennis player to represent Luxembourg at the Olympics.
