= Frane Tomislav Kojić =

Croatian table tennis player (born 1992)

Personal information
- Nationality: Croatian
- Born: 8 January 1992 (age 33)

Sport
- Sport: Table tennis

Frane Tomislav Kojić (born 8 January 1992) is a Croatian table tennis player. He competed in the 2020 Summer Olympics for Croatia.
