= Tomislav Pucar =

Croatian table tennis player

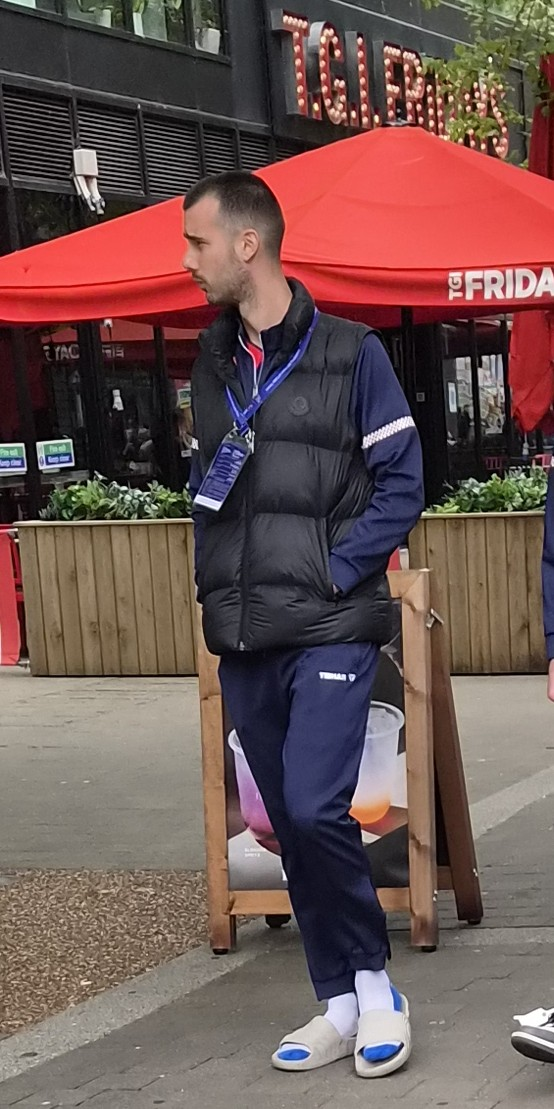
- 2026 World Team Table Tennis Championships

Personal information
- Nationality: Croatia
- Born: 26 January 1996 (age 30) Pula, Croatia
- Height: 199 cm (6 ft 6 in)
- Weight: 88 kg (194 lb)

Sport
- Sport: Table tennis
- Club: TTC RhönSprudel Fulda-Maberzell
- Playing style: Right-handed, shakehand grip
- Highest ranking: 29 (August 2025)
- Current ranking: 26 (2 November 2026)
Medal record
Table tennis
Representing Croatia
European Games
Bronze medal – third place	2019 Minsk	Singles
European Championships
Bronze medal – third place	2014 Lisbon	Team
European Under-21 Championships
Gold medal – first place	2017 Sochi	Singles
Silver medal – second place	2017 Sochi	Men's Doubles
European Youth Championships
Gold medal – first place	2014 Riva del Garda	Mixed Doubles
Silver medal – second place	2013 Ostrava	Singles

Tomislav Pucar (born 26 January 1996) is a Croatian table tennis player. In February 2017 he won the men's singles title at the inaugural European Under-21 Championships in Sochi.

As of 2018, Pucar is playing for TTC RhönSprudel Fulda-Maberzel in the German Bundesliga. From 2021, Pucar played for Olympiacos SFP in the Greek A1 Division, until 2022, where he played for Apuania Carrara Tennistavolo in the Italian Serie A1. He currently plays for TTC RhönSprudel Fulda-Maberzell.

== Career records ==
Senior career highlights, as of April 2018:

=== Singles ===
- World Championships: Round of 128 (2017), Round of 16 (2019)
- ITTF World Tour:
  - QF: 2014 Croatia Open
  - Last 16: 2015 Bulgarian Open, 2017 Qatar Open
- European Championships: Last 64 (2016)

=== Men's doubles ===
- World Championships: Last 64 (2017)
- ITTF World Tour:
  - Last 16: 2016 Croatia Open, 2017 Swedish Open
- European Championships: Last 32 (2016)

=== Mixed doubles ===
- World Championships: Last 64 (2015)

=== Team ===
- World Team Championships: Last 12 (2016, 2018)
- European Championships: SF (2014); QF (2017); Last 16 (2015)
- European Games: Last 16 (2015)
