= Yaroslav Zhmudenko =

Ukrainian table tennis player (born 1988)

Personal information
- Nationality: Ukraine
- Born: 24 September 1988 (age 37) Uman, Ukrainian SSR, Soviet Union
- Height: 175 cm (5 ft 9 in)
- Weight: 70 kg (154 lb)

Sport
- Sport: Table tennis
Medal record
Men's table tennis
Representing Ukraine
European Youth Olympic Festival
Bronze medal – third place	2003 Paris	Singles
Bronze medal – third place	2003 Paris	Doubles

Yaroslav Zhmudenko is a Ukrainian table tennis player. He plays in The team of superdivisión spanish in The team CTT OLOT He competed at the 2012 Summer Olympics in the Men's singles, but was defeated in the first round by Omar Assar from Egypt. He competed at the 2024 Summer Olympics, but lost in the round 1 to the eventual champion Fan Zhendong from China.
