= Bence Majoros =

Hungarian table tennis player

Personal information
- Nationality: Hungary
- Born: 28 July 1997 (age 27); Budapest

Sport
- Sport: Table tennis
- Club: C’Chartres Tennis de Table (France)

Bence Majoros (born 28 July 1997) is a Hungarian table tennis player. He competed in the 2020 Summer Olympics.

== Achievements ==
=== 2018 Hungarian Open ===
– U21 Men's Singles Silver Medalist

=== 2017 U21 European Championships ===
– Men's Doubles Silver Medalist

=== TOP 10 Junior ===
– Singles Bronze Medalist

=== Hungarian Champion ===
1x Mixed Doubles Champion 2x Doubles Champion 1x Doubles Bronze Medalist 1x Singles Champion 1x Singles Bronze Medalist
