= Ľubomír Pištej =

Slovak table tennis player (born 1984)

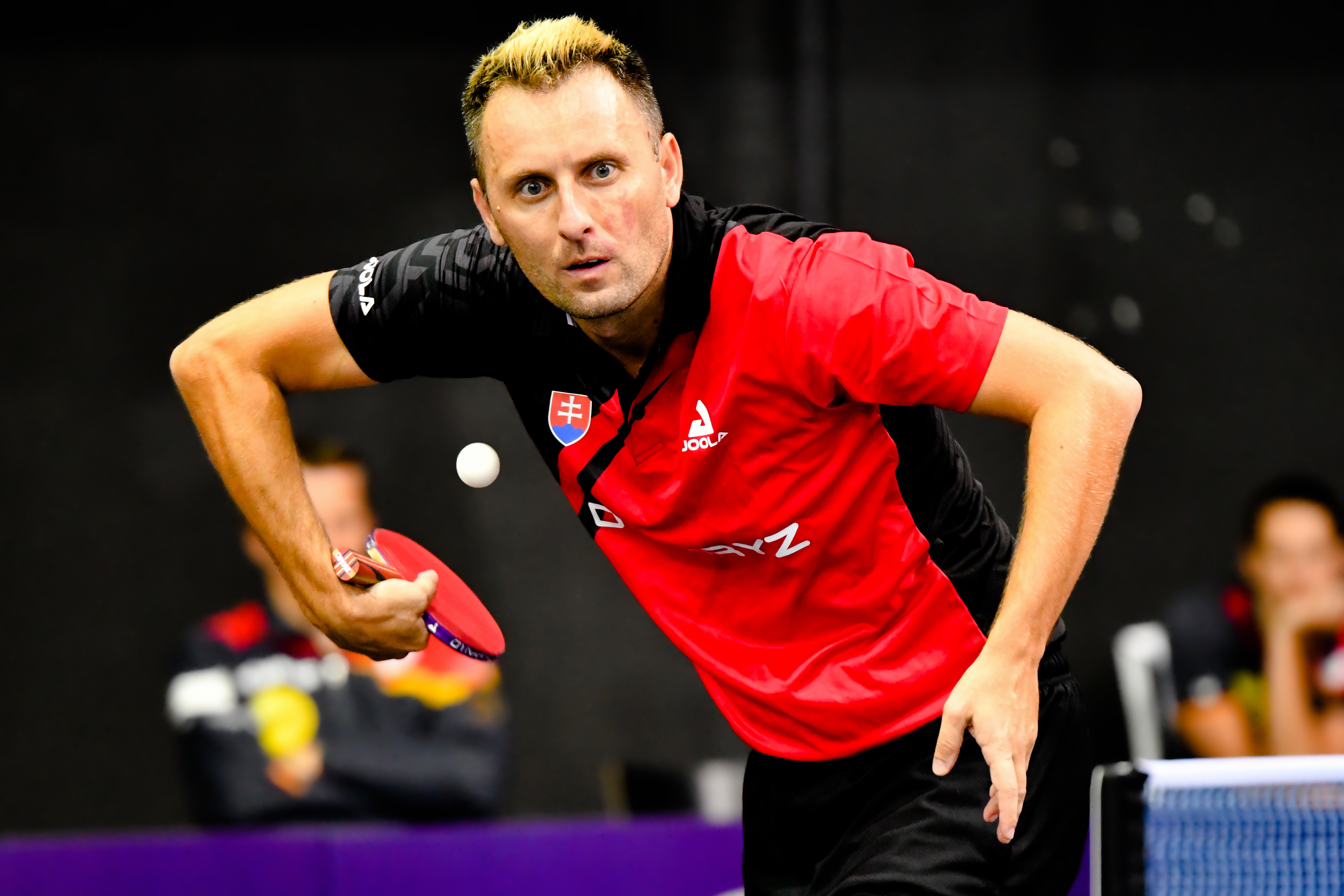

Personal information
- Nationality: Slovakia
- Born: 6 March 1984 (age 42) Prešov, Slovakia

Sport
- Sport: Table tennis
Medal record
Men's table tennis
Representing Slovakia
European Championships
Silver medal – second place	2013 Buzău	Mixed doubles
Silver medal – second place	2020 Warsaw	Mixed doubles
Bronze medal – third place	2022 Munich	Mixed doubles

Ľubomír Pištej (born 6 March 1984) is a Slovak table tennis player. He competed in the 2020 Summer Olympics. From 2021 until 2024, he played with Apuania Carrara Tennistavolo, winning the Europe Cup, Coppa Italia, Supercoppa.

== Major League Table Tennis ==
In May 2024, Pištej joined Major League Table Tennis (MLTT) for its second season (2024–2025). He was signed to the Los Angeles Spinners (formerly the Seattle Spinners), representing the team in the West Division under head coach Romain Lorentz.

During the 2025–2026 season, Pištej remained a core member of the Spinners' rotation. In Week 8 of the season, he won six of nine doubles games, including a three-game sweep against New York’s Wenzhang Tao and Jishan Liang while partnered with Marcos Madrid. In November 2025, he competed in a singles match against Yiran Wu during the league's Week 5 fixtures in Pleasantville, New York.
