= Ovidiu Ionescu =

Romanian table tennis player

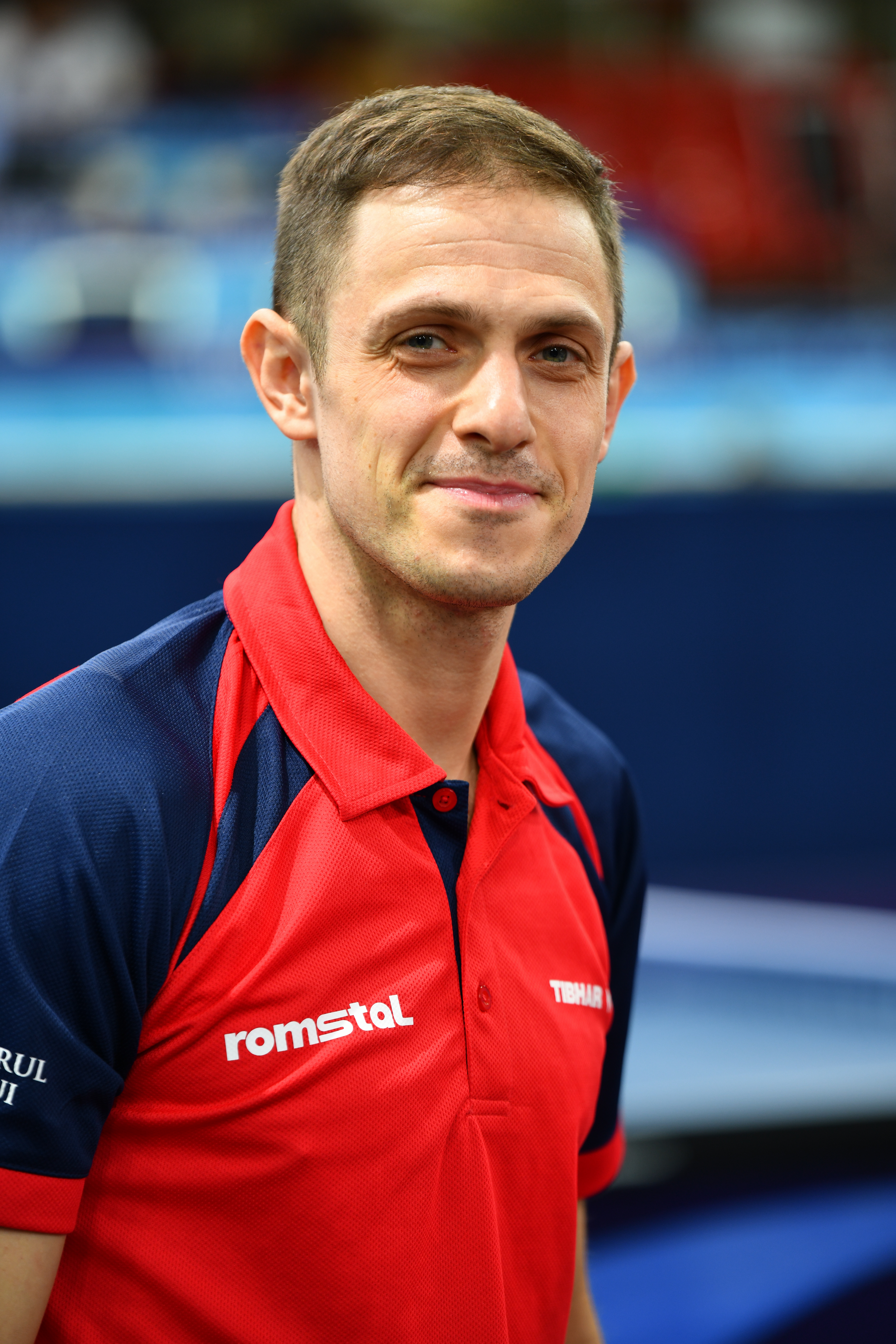
- Ionescu in 2022

Personal information
- Full name: Ovidiu George Ionescu
- Born: 28 June 1989 (age 37) Buzău, Romania
- Height: 1.83 m (6 ft 0 in)
- Weight: 72 kg (159 lb)

Sport
- Sport: Table tennis
- Club: Post SV Mühlhausen & SCM Gloria Buzău
- Playing style: Right-handed shakehand grip
- Highest ranking: 39 (March 2019)
- Current ranking: 123 (28 September 2026)
Medal record
Men's table tennis
Representing Romania
World Championships
Silver medal – second place	2019 Budapest	Doubles
European Games
Silver medal – second place	2019 Minsk	Mixed doubles
Bronze medal – third place	2023 Kraków–Małopolska	Mixed doubles
European Championships
Silver medal – second place	2018 Alicante	Singles
Silver medal – second place	2022 Munich	Mixed doubles
Silver medal – second place	2025 Zadar	Team
Bronze medal – third place	2012 Buzău	Mixed Doubles
Bronze medal – third place	2016 Budapest	Mixed Doubles

Ovidiu George Ionescu (born 28 June 1989) is a Romanian professional table tennis player who plays with Post SV Mühlhausen and SCM Gloria Buzău.

== Career ==
Ionescu competed at the 2016 Summer Olympics in the singles event, in which he was eliminated in the third round by Marcos Freitas.

In September 2018, Ionescu reached his first European Championships final but lost to No.1 seed Timo Boll. He defeated holder of the continental title Emmanuel Lebesson in the second round, 6th seed Jonathan Groth in the round of 16, 9th seed Vladimir Samsonov in the quarterfinals and 8th seed Kristian Karlsson in the semi-finals.

== Titles ==
- Romanian Championships: 3 singles titles (2015, 2016, 2017)
- World Championships: men's doubles runner-up (2019, together with Álvaro Robles)
- European Championships: singles runner-up (2008); mixed doubles runner-up (2022, together with Bernadette Szőcs)

== Clubs ==
Ionescu has been playing in Germany since 2005.
