= Wang Yang (table tennis) =

Slovak table tennis player (born 1994)

Personal information
- Nationality: Slovakia
- Born: September 24, 1994 (age 32) Anhui, China

Sport
- Sport: Table tennis
- Club: TTC Caen
- Highest ranking: 32 (March 2020)
- Current ranking: 88 (2 November 2026)

Wang Yang (Chinese: 汪洋, Slovak: Jang Wang; born 24 September 1994) is a Slovak table tennis player. He competed at the 2016 and 2020 Summer Olympics in table tennis. He qualified for the 2024 Summer Olympics as well.

At the 2011 junior championship Wang was forced to drop out due to doubts about his age. Later he was able to prove he was indeed born in 1994.

At the 2016 Summer Olympics men's singles event, in which he was eliminated in the second round by Quadri Aruna. At the 2020 Olympics in the same category he advanced to the third round past David Powell but lost in third round to Koki Niwa.
