= 2026 Europe Top 16 Cup =

Table tennis event

2026 CCB Europe Top 16 Cup
- Venue: Salle Omnisport du Pierrier
- Location: Montreux, Switzerland
- Dates: 5–8 February 2026

The 2026 CCB Europe Top 16 Cup, officially known as the China Construction Bank Europe Top 16 Cup Montreux, is a top-tier continental table tennis event sanctioned by the European Table Tennis Union (ETTU). It will be held from 5 to 8 February 2026 at the Salle Omnisport du Pierrier in Montreux, Switzerland.

== Qualification ==
A total of 22 players qualify for each singles event, structured and determined as follows:

Automatic Qualifiers (Do not occupy ranking spots):

- 2024 European Championships winners.
- 2025 Europe Top 16 Cup winners.

Ranking Qualifiers (Direct Main Draw spots):

Excluding the above champions, based on the ETTU European Rankings published on 5 December 2025:

- Men's Singles: The 20 highest-ranked players.
- Women's Singles: The 19 highest-ranked players.

Among these qualifiers, the 14 highest-ranked players enter the main draw directly, while the remaining 8 players compete in a qualifying tournament.

Seeding Rules:

The specific seed numbers for the 14 direct main draw qualifiers and the 8 players from the qualifying tournament will be finalized based on the January 2026 ETTU European Rankings.

== Player List ==
(Q) denotes need to participate in the qualifying tournament

| Qualification Path | Men's Qualifiers | Women's Qualifiers |
|---|---|---|
| Host Nation (1 per gender) | (Switzerland) Pedro Osiro (Q) | (Switzerland) Rachel Moret (Q) |
| 2024 European Championships Winner (1 per gender) | (France) Alexis Lebrun | (Austria) Sofia Polcanova |
| 2025 CCB Europe Top 16 Cup Winner (Women's 1) | ~~(France) Alexis Lebrun~~ (Note: Alexis Lebrun already qualified as the 2024 European Champion; the vacant spot will be given to the highest-ranked European player.) | (Germany) Han Ying |
| European Ranking (Men's 20 spots, Women's 19 spots) | (Sweden) Truls Möregårdh (1) (France) Felix Lebrun (3) (Slovenia) Darko Jorgić (4) (Germany) Benedikt Duda (5) (Germany) Patrick Franziska (6) (Germany) Qiu Dang (7) (Germany) Dimitrij Ovtcharov (8) (Sweden) Anton Källberg (9) (Denmark) Anders Lind (10) (France) Simon Gauzy (11) (Denmark) Jonathan Groth (12) (Portugal) Marcos Freitas (13) (Romania) Eduard Ionescu (14) (Spain) Álvaro Robles (Q15) (Croatia) Tomislav Pucar (Q16); ~~(Poland) Milosz Redzimski~~ (Croatia) Andrej Gacina (Q17) (Sweden) Kristian Karlsson (Q18); ~~(England) Liam Pitchford~~ (Austria) Daniel Habesohn (Q19) | (Germany) Sabine Winter (1) (Romania) Bernadette Szocs (3) (France) Jia Nan Yuan (5) (Romania) Elizabeta Samara (6) (France) Prithika Pavade (7) (Sweden) Linda Bergström （8) (Portugal) Jieni Shao (9) (Germany) Nina Mittelham (10) (Portugal) Fu Yu (11) (Spain) Xiao Maria (12) (Poland) Natalia Bajor (13) (Germany) Shan Xiaona (14) (Wales) Anna Hursey (Q15) (Germany) Annett Kaufmann (Q16) (France) Charlotte Lutz (Q17) (Romania) Andreea Dragoman (Q18) (Serbia) Izabela Lupulesku (Q19) (Czech Republic) ~~Hana Matelová~~ (Croatia) Lea Rakovac (Q20) |
| Replacement (Any new player replacing a qualified player above will be considered a replacement.) | (Portugal) João Geraldo (Q20) (Romania) Iulian Chirita (Q21) | (Hungary) Georgina Póta (Q21) |

== Men's Singles ==
=== Qualifying Tournament ===
The qualifying tournament was held on 5 February. 8 players competed in a single-elimination bracket, with 2 players (Q1/Q2) advancing to the Main Draw.

First Round
17 | (Croatia) Gacina | 8 | 7 | 11 | 9
21 | (Romania) Chirita | 11 | 11 | 5 | 11
19 | (Austria) Habesohn | 8 | 11 | 9
16 | (Croatia) Pucar | 11 | 13 | 11
15 | (Spain) Robles | 11 | 5 | 12 | 11
22 | (Switzerland) Osiro | 9 | 11 | 10 | 8
20 | (Portugal) Geraldo | 11 | 13 | 5 | 5 | 11
18 | (Sweden) Karlsson | 5 | 11 | 11 | 11 | 8

Second Round; Winners of the second round advance directly to the Main Draw; there is no third round.
21 | (Romania) Chirita | 10 | 8 | 3
16 | (Croatia) Pucar | 12 | 11 | 11
15 | (Spain) Robles | 11 | 11 | 11
20 | (Portugal) Geraldo | 7 | 3 | 5

Advances to Main Draw
16 | (Croatia) Pucar | Q1
15 | (Spain) Robles | Q2

=== Main Draw (Round of 16 to Final) ===
Round of 16
1 | (Sweden) Möregårdh | 11 | 9 | 9 | 4
13 | (Portugal) Freitas | 9 | 11 | 11 | 11
9 | (Sweden) Källberg | 6 | 11 | 11 | 12 | 13
5 | (Germany) Duda | 11 | 6 | 5 | 14 | 15
7 | (Germany) Qiu | 6 | 11 | 11 | 6 | 10
Q16 | (Croatia) Pucar | 11 | 8 | 7 | 11 | 12
12 | (Denmark) Groth | 14 | 3 | 8 | 8
4 | (Slovenia) Jorgić | 12 | 11 | 11 | 11
3 | (France) F. Lebrun | 11 | 11 | 11
Q15 | (Spain) Robles | 4 | 8 | 7
10 | (Denmark) Lind | 11 | 11 | 11
8 | (Germany) Ovtcharov | 7 | 8 | 9
6 | (Germany) Franziska | 12 | 9 | 11 | 8
11 | (France) Gauzy | 10 | 11 | 13 | 11
14 | (Romania) Ionescu | 4 | 5 | 7
2 | (France) A. Lebrun | 11 | 11 | 11

Quarterfinals
13 | (Portugal) Freitas | 14 | 15 | 7 | 7
5 | (Germany) Duda | 12 | 17 | 11 | 11
Q16 | (Croatia) Pucar | 4 | 8 | 7
4 | (Slovenia) Jorgić | 11 | 11 | 11
3 | (France) F. Lebrun | 11 | 11 | 11
10 | (Denmark) Lind | 8 | 5 | 7
11 | (France) Gauzy | 11 | 11 | 12 | 2 | 12
2 | (France) A. Lebrun | 7 | 13 | 10 | 11 | 14

Semifinals
5 | (Germany) Duda | 7 | 11 | 7 | 4
4 | (Slovenia) Jorgić | 11 | 6 | 11 | 11
3 | (France) F. Lebrun | 9 | 6 | 9
2 | (France) A. Lebrun | 11 | 11 | 11

Final
4 | (Slovenia) Jorgić | 6 | 6 | 11 | 6
2 | (France) A. Lebrun | 11 | 11 | 9 | 11

== Women's Singles ==
=== Qualifying Tournament ===
The qualifying tournament was held on 5 February. 8 players competed in a single-elimination bracket, with 2 players (Q1/Q2) advancing to the Main Draw.

First Round
16 | (Germany) Kaufmann | 3
20 | (Croatia) Rakovac | 1
21 | (Hungary) Póta | 0
15 | (Wales) Hursey | 3
18 | (Romania) Dragoman | 1
19 | (Serbia) Lupulesku | 3
22 | (Switzerland) Moret | 0
17 | (France) Lutz | 3

Second Round; Winners of the second round advance directly to the Main Draw; there is no third round.
16 | (Germany) Kaufmann | 3
15 | (Wales) Hursey | 1
19 | (Serbia) Lupulesku | 1
17 | (France) Lutz | 3

Advances to Main Draw
16 | (Germany) Kaufmann | Q1
17 | (France) Lutz | Q2

=== Main Draw (Round of 16 to Final) ===
Round of 16
1 | (Germany) Winter | 11 | 11 | 11
14 | (Germany) Shan | 8 | 8 | 8
12 | (Spain) Xiao | 8 | 11 | 24 | 9 | 11
6 | (Romania) Samara | 11 | 7 | 22 | 11 | 6
7 | (France) Pavade | 8 | 5 | 12
11 | (Portugal) Fu | 11 | 11 | 14
Q16 | (Germany) Kaufmann | 9 | 6 | 11 | 12 | 6
4 | (Germany) Han | 11 | 11 | 9 | 10 | 11
3 | (Romania) Szocs | 11 | 11 | 11
13 | (Poland) Bajor | 3 | 8 | 8
Q17 | (France) Lutz | 11 | 11 | 11
8 | (Sweden) Bergström | 0 | 3 | 4
5 | (France) Yuan | 11 | 11 | 5 | 13
10 | (Germany) Mittelham | 6 | 6 | 11 | 11
9 | (Portugal) Shao | 5 | 7 | 8
2 | (Austria) Polcanova | 11 | 11 | 11

Quarterfinals
1 | (Germany) Winter | 12 | 11 | 11 | 11
12 | (Spain) Xiao | 14 | 6 | 4 | 9
11 | (Portugal) Fu | 8 | 11 | 8 | 11 | 4
4 | (Germany) Han | 11 | 6 | 11 | 5 | 11
3 | (Romania) Szocs | 11 | 4 | 11 | 11
Q17 | (France) Lutz | 7 | 11 | 8 | 5
5 | (France) Yuan | 19 | 11 | 11
2 | (Austria) Polcanova | 17 | 4 | 4

Semifinals
1 | (Germany) Winter | 11 | 11 | 11
4 | (Germany) Han | 8 | 5 | 9
3 | (Romania) Szocs | 9 | 11 | 11 | 11
5 | (France) Yuan | 11 | 9 | 5 | 5

Final
1 | (Germany) Winter | 11 | 11 | 11
3 | (Romania) Szocs | 4 | 4 | 4
