= Singapore Smash 2022 =

Table tennis tournament in Singapore

Tournament details
- Dates: 7–20 March
- Edition: 1st
- Total prize money: US$2,000,000
- Venue: Singapore Sports Hub
- Location: Singapore

Champions
- Men's singles: (China) Fan Zhendong
- Women's singles: (China) Chen Meng
- Men's doubles: (China) Fan Zhendong (China) Wang Chuqin
- Women's doubles: (China) Wang Manyu (China) Sun Yingsha
- Mixed doubles: (China) Wang Chuqin (China) Sun Yingsha

The Singapore Smash 2022 was a table tennis tournament that took place at the Singapore Sports Hub, Singapore, from 7 to 20 March 2022 and had a total prize of US$2,000,000.

According to World Table Tennis (WTT), the first-ever Singapore Smash tournament was broadcast in 196 countries, reaching more than 160 million viewers. The winners of the championship were Fan Zhendong and Chen Meng, both from China.

== Tournament ==
The Singapore Smash 2022 was the third tournament of the 2022 WTT Series and is part of the Singapore Smash championships, which had been held since 2022.

=== Venue ===
This tournament was held at the Singapore Sports Hub in Singapore.

=== Point distribution ===
Below is the point distribution table for each phase of the tournament based on the WTT World Ranking for the Grand Smashes event.

Event	Winner	Finalist	Semi-finalist	Quarter-finalist	Round of 16	Round of 24	Round of 32	Round of 64
Singles	2,000	1,400	700	350	175	—	90	10
Doubles	2,000	1,400	700	350	175	10	—	—
Mixed doubles	2,000	1,400	700	350	10	—	—	—

=== Prize pool ===
The total prize money is US$2,000,000 with the distribution of the prize money in accordance with WTT regulations.

Event	Winner	Finalist	Semi-finalist	Quarter-finalist	Round of 16	Round of 24	Round of 32	Round of 64
Singles	$100,000	$60,000	$30,000	$22,500	$15,000	—	$10,000	$5,000
Doubles	$12,000	$8,000	$6,000	$4,000	$2,000	$1,000	—	—
Mixed doubles	$12,000	$8,000	$6,000	$4,000	$3,000	—	—	—

== Men's singles ==
=== Seeds ===
1. (China) Fan Zhendong (champion)
2. (China) Ma Long (final)
3. (Brazil) Hugo Calderano (round of 64)
4. (Japan) Tomokazu Harimoto (round of 64)
5. (China) Liang Jingkun (semi-finals)
6. (Chinese Taipei) Lin Yun-ju (quarter-finals)
7. (Germany) Timo Boll (round of 32)
8. (China) Xu Xin (round of 16)

=== Finals ===
Semifinals
1	(China) Fan Zhendong	11	7	11	16	11	11
(Japan) Yukiya Uda	9	11	7	14	13	9
5	(China) Liang Jingkun	5	9	4	8
2	(China) Ma Long	11	11	11	11

Final
1	(China) Fan Zhendong	11	11	6	9	8	11	11
2	(China) Ma Long	6	6	11	11	11	8	7

=== Top half ===
==== Section 1 ====
Round of 64
1	(China) Fan ZD	11	11	5	11
(Portugal) T Apolonia	8	8	11	9
(Slovakia) Y Wang	7	10	7
(Japan) M Morizono	11	12	11
(Chinese Taipei) Chuang C-y	11	11	11	4	11
(Germany) R Filus	7	4	13	11	8
(South Korea) An J-h	11	11	4	11
(Germany) R Walther	8	3	11	9
(South Korea) Jang W-j	11	11	9	5
(Hong Kong) Wong C T	13	8	11	11
(Germany) P Franziska	11	11	11
(Austria) D Habesohn	7	5	4
(Sweden) J Persson	11	11	5	5	11
(Spain) A Robles	4	6	11	11	6
(Singapore) C Chew	3	1	7
8	(China) Xu X	11	11	11

Round of 32
1	(China) Fan ZD	11	11	13
(Japan) M Morizono	8	6	11
(Chinese Taipei) Chuang C-y	11	11	5	5	10
(South Korea) An J-h	7	7	11	11	12
(Hong Kong) Wong C T	5	4	11	8
(Germany) P Franziska	11	11	9	11
(Sweden) J Persson	9	14	6
8	(China) Xu X	11	16	11

Round of 16
1	(China) Fan ZD	11	6	11	11	11
(South Korea) An J-h	4	11	13	5	7
(Germany) P Franziska	11	8	11	9	11
8	(China) Xu X	6	11	9	11	9

Quarterfinals
1	(China) Fan ZD	11	11	11
(Germany) P Franziska	4	7	8

==== Section 2 ====
Round of 64
4	(Japan) T Harimoto	11	9	9	3
(United States) K Jha	7	11	11	11
(India) S K Achanta	11	7	6	8
(Sweden) A Kallberg	6	11	11	11
(Egypt) O Assar	6	4	5
(Germany) D Qiu	11	11	11
(China) Xiang P	3	8	10
(Denmark) J Groth	11	11	12
(South Korea) Lim J-h	11	11	11
(China) Lin GY	6	9	6
(Singapore) K Pang	5	11	9	8
(India) S Gnanasekaran	11	8	11	11
(Chinese Taipei) Liao C-t	10	9	11
(Japan) Y Uda	12	11	13
(Brazil) G Tsuboi	6	12	3	11	5
7	(Germany) T Boll	11	10	11	5	11

Round of 32
(United States) K Jha	12	8	6	9
(Sweden) A Kallberg	10	11	11	11
(Germany) D Qiu	12	12	12
(Denmark) J Groth	10	10	10
(South Korea) Lim J-h	11	5	11	11
(India) S Gnanasekaran	3	11	8	4
(Japan) Y Uda	11	10	10	12	11
7	(Germany) T Boll	8	12	12	10	5

Round of 16
(Sweden) A Kallberg	9	7	11	8
(Germany) D Qiu	11	11	7	11
(South Korea) Lim J-h	9	10	11	10
(Japan) Y Uda	11	12	3	12

Quarterfinals
(Germany) D Qiu	13	7	11	5	6
(Japan) Y Uda	11	11	9	11	11

=== Bottom half ===
==== Section 3 ====
Round of 64
5	(China) Liang JK	11	9	11	11
(France) S Gauzy	5	11	7	5
(Romania) O Ionescu	8	15	11	5	10
(Austria) R Gardos	11	13	7	11	12
(Kazakhstan) K Gerassimenko	11	12	9	11
(Singapore) E Poh	5	10	11	4
(Chinese Taipei) Chen C-a	15	12	11	6	11
(Croatia) T Pucar	13	14	3	11	13
(Singapore) I Quek	3	9	9
(Germany) B Duda	11	11	11
(Egypt) A Saleh	7	11	8	9
(Sweden) T Moregard	11	6	11	11
(Brazil) V Ishiy	11	8	11	6	8
(Sweden) K Karlsson	5	11	5	11	11
(Portugal) J Geraldo	10	11	11	10	11
3	(Brazil) H Calderano	12	3	7	12	6

Round of 32
5	(China) Liang JK	12	4	11	11
(Austria) R Gardos	10	11	6	5
(Kazakhstan) K Gerassimenko	15	11	7	11
(Croatia) T Pucar	13	7	11	9
(Germany) B Duda	8	11	11	9	11
(Sweden) T Moregard	11	3	9	11	7
(Sweden) K Karlsson	12	12	11	12
(Portugal) J Geraldo	14	10	9	10

Round of 16
5	(China) Liang JK	9	11	11	11
(Kazakhstan) K Gerassimenko	11	6	2	7
(Germany) B Duda	11	4	6	8
(Sweden) K Karlsson	6	11	11	11

Quarterfinals
5	(China) Liang JK	11	11	11
(Sweden) K Karlsson	8	7	9

==== Section 4 ====
Round of 64
6	(Chinese Taipei) Lin Y-j	11	11	11
(Finland) B Olah	8	7	5
(France) E Lebesson	8	11	7	7
(Croatia) A Gacina	11	8	11	11
(China) Lin SD	11	11	11
(Senegal) I Diaw	5	9	6
(Slovenia) D Jorgic	12	11	9	11	11
(Japan) S Togami	14	7	11	8	9
(Paraguay) M Aguirre	7	14	5	2
(England) L Pitchford	11	12	11	11
(Sweden) M Falck	11	4	11
(China) Wang CQ	13	11	13
(South Korea) Lee S-s	13	9	7	11	8
(Nigeria) Q Aruna	11	11	11	6	11
(Portugal) M Freitas	5	11	3	5
2	(China) Ma L	11	5	11	11

Round of 32
6	(Chinese Taipei) Lin Y-j	11	11	11
(Croatia) A Gacina	6	6	7
(China) Lin SD	12	6	11	7	10
(Slovenia) D Jorgic	10	11	7	11	12
(England) L Pitchford	8	8	5
(China) Wang CQ	11	11	11
(Nigeria) Q Aruna	4	11	6	9
2	(China) Ma L	11	5	11	11

Round of 16
6	(Chinese Taipei) Lin Y-j	11	11	11
(Slovenia) D Jorgic	4	3	9
(China) Wang CQ	10	11	11	5	6
2	(China) Ma L	12	6	8	11	11

Quarterfinals
6	(Chinese Taipei) Lin Y-j	11	6	4	11	7
2	(China) Ma L	5	11	11	9	11

== Women's singles ==
=== Seeds ===
1. (China) Sun Yingsha (semi-finals)
2. (China) Chen Meng (champion)
3. (Japan) Mima Ito (round of 16)
4. (China) Wang Manyu (final)
5. (China) Wang Yidi (semi-finals)
6. (Japan) Hina Hayata (quarter-finals)
7. (Hong Kong) Doo Hoi Kem (round of 32)
8. (Japan) Kasumi Ishikawa (quarter-finals)

=== Finals ===
Semifinals
1	(China) Sun Yingsha	11	10	11	10	9	14	8
4	(China) Wang Manyu	7	12	9	12	11	12	11
5	(China) Wang Yidi	3	11	11	4	12	11	8
2	(China) Chen Meng	11	13	9	11	10	8	11

Final
4	(China) Wang Manyu	9	11	9	8	11	11	8
2	(China) Chen Meng	11	8	11	11	6	9	11

=== Top half ===
==== Section 1 ====
Round of 64
1	(China) Sun YS	11	11	11
(Germany) S Winter	3	7	2
(Singapore) Feng T	9	5	11	6
(China) Kuai M	11	11	9	11
(Germany) X Shan	9	11	11	11
(South Korea) Choi H-j	11	5	7	4
(South Korea) Jeon J-h	11	6	10
(China) Liu SW	13	11	12
(Egypt) D Meshref	0	6	7
(Hong Kong) Lee H C	11	11	11
(South Korea) Suh H-w	11	8	11	7	13
(Sweden) L Bergstrom	8	11	6	11	11
(Singapore) Goi R X	11	9	11	11
(Chinese Taipei) Cheng H-t	9	11	8	8
(Luxembourg) S de Nutte	4	11	9	11	1
6	(Japan) H Hayata	11	9	11	7	11

Round of 32
1	(China) Sun YS	11	11	11
(China) Kuai M	8	5	5
(Germany) X Shan	7	7	11
(China) Liu SW	11	11	13
(Hong Kong) Lee H C	8	11	11	11
(South Korea) Suh H-w	11	6	8	4
(Singapore) Goi R X	4	2	4
6	(Japan) H Hayata	11	11	11

Round of 16
1	(China) Sun YS	11	11	11
(China) Liu SW	5	5	9
(Hong Kong) Lee H C	5	11	8	10
6	(Japan) H Hayata	11	6	11	12

Quarterfinals
1	(China) Sun YS	11	11	11
6	(Japan) H Hayata	9	7	9

==== Section 2 ====
Round of 64
4	(China) Wang MY	11	11	11
(Chinese Taipei) Liu H-y	6	1	7
(Singapore) Lin Y	8	11	11	7	6
(Hungary) G Pota	11	5	6	11	11
(Croatia) M Jeger	1	7	7
(Puerto Rico) A Diaz	11	11	11
(Portugal) J Shao	11	11	11
(Singapore) Wong X R	2	9	5
(Slovakia) B Balazova	11	11	11
(Singapore) Zhou J	7	3	6
(Germany) P Solja	8	5	3
(Thailand) S Sawettabut	11	11	11
(Austria) S Polcanova	11	9	12	11
(Romania) B Szocs	7	11	10	5
(Netherlands) B Eerland	12	6	8
7	(Hong Kong) Doo H K	14	11	11

Round of 32
4	(China) Wang MY	11	11	11
(Hungary) G Pota	6	4	6
(Puerto Rico) A Diaz	11	11	8	11
(Portugal) J Shao	6	7	11	7
(Slovakia) B Balazova	11	3	11	10	2
(Thailand) S Sawettabut	8	11	8	12	11
(Austria) S Polcanova	4	11	12	11
7	(Hong Kong) Doo H K	11	9	10	6

Round of 16
4	(China) Wang MY	11	11	11
(Puerto Rico) A Diaz	3	5	5
(Thailand) S Sawettabut	8	11	6	9
(Austria) S Polcanova	11	8	11	11

Quarterfinals
4	(China) Wang MY	12	11	11
(Austria) S Polcanova	10	8	2

=== Bottom half ===
==== Section 3 ====
Round of 64
5	(China) Wang YD	9	11	8	11	11
(China) Chen XT	11	9	11	6	6
(Japan) M Hirano	11	7	11	11
(Monaco) X Yang	6	11	9	3
(Germany) N Mittelham	8	11	11	11
(Egypt) M Alhodaby	11	4	6	8
(Hungary) D Madarasz	11	11	11
(Romania) E Samara	8	7	8
(Sweden) C Kallberg	5	11	7	7
(Portugal) Fu Y	11	8	11	11
(France) J N Yuan	11	11	12
(Hong Kong) M Soo	2	6	10
(India) A Mukherjee	3	9	8
(Chinese Taipei) Chen S-y	11	11	11
(Germany) Y Han	3	5	11	5
3	(Japan) M Ito	11	11	9	11

Round of 32
5	(China) Wang YD	13	11	11
(Japan) M Hirano	11	7	8
(Germany) N Mittelham	9	11	11	11
(Hungary) D Madarasz	11	8	6	5
(Portugal) Fu Y	11	5	5	11	4
(France) J N Yuan	7	11	11	6	11
(Chinese Taipei) Chen S-y	6	11	7	10
3	(Japan) M Ito	11	6	11	12

Round of 16
5	(China) Wang YD	11	11	11
(Germany) N Mittelham	5	5	9
(France) J N Yuan	5	11	11	11
3	(Japan) M Ito	11	7	8	7

Quarter final
5	(China) Wang YD	11	12	12	12
(France) J N Yuan	9	10	14	10

==== Section 4 ====
Round of 64
8	(Japan) K Ishikawa	11	11	12
(United States) L Zhang	2	8	10
(Chinese Taipei) Li Y-j	4	10	17
(Czech Republic) H Matelova	11	12	19
(Brazil) B Takahashi	16	8	5	11	11
(South Korea) Yang H-e	14	11	11	9	9
(Japan) M Kato	5	11	4	11	15
(Chinese Taipei) Cheng I-c	11	9	11	9	17
(Canada) M Zhang	12	12	13	11
(India) M Batra	14	10	11	8
(Luxembourg) X L Ni	4	7	9
(China) He Z	11	11	11
(Puerto Rico) M Diaz	9	3	8
(Singapore) Zeng J	11	11	11
(Japan) H Sato	8	7	9
2	(China) Chen M	11	11	11

Round of 32
8	(Japan) K Ishikawa	13	11	11
(Czech Republic) H Matelova	11	5	5
(Brazil) B Takahashi	9	11	5	8
(Chinese Taipei) Cheng I-c	11	8	11	11
(Canada) M Zhang	5	11	8	8
(China) He ZJ	11	4	11	11
(Singapore) Zeng J	11	3	9	6
2	(China) Chen M	7	11	11	11

Round of 16
8	(Japan) K Ishikawa	11	11	5	8	11
(Chinese Taipei) Cheng I-c	8	8	11	11	1
(China) He ZJ	8	4	9
2	(China) Chen M	11	11	11

Quarter final
8	(Japan) K Ishikawa	8	11	0	7
2	(China) Chen M	11	9	11	11

== Men's doubles ==
=== Seeds ===
1. (Sweden) Kristian Karlsson / (Sweden) Mattias Falck (round of 16)
2. (South Korea) Jang Woo-jin / (South Korea) Lim Jong-hoon (quarter-finals)
3. (Japan) Shunsuke Togami / (Japan) Yukiya Uda (final)
4. (Spain) Alvaro Robles / (Romania) Ovidiu Ionescu (round of 16)
5. (Germany) Benedikt Duda / (Germany) Dang Qiu (semi-finals)
6. (Hungary) Adam Szudi / (Hungary) Nandor Ecseki (quarter-finals)
7. (China) Fan Zhendong / (China) Wang Chuqin (champion)
8. (Chinese Taipei) Chen Chien-an / (Chinese Taipei) Chuang Chih-yuan (semi-finals)

=== Finals ===
Semifinals
5	(Germany) Benedikt Duda (Germany) Dang Qiu	7	2	11	13
7	(China) Fan Zhendong (China) Wang Chuqin	11	11	9	15
3	(Japan) Shunsuke Togami (Japan) Yukiya Uda	11	11	11	11
8	(Chinese Taipei) Chen Chien-an (Chinese Taipei) Chuang Chih-yuan	9	5	13	5

Final
7	(China) Fan Zhendong (China) Wang Chuqin	12	12	12	11
3	(Japan) Shunsuke Togami (Japan) Yukiya Uda	10	10	14	7

=== Top Half ===
==== Section 1 ====
Round of 24
(Austria) D Habesohn (Austria) R Gardos	14	9	11	11
(Brazil) E Jouti (Brazil) V Ishiy	12	11	5	6
(Hong Kong) Ho K K (Hong Kong) Wong C T	7	6	5
(Slovenia) D Jorgic (Czech Republic) T Polansky	11	11	11

Round of 16
1	(Sweden) K Karlsson (Sweden) M Falck	3	11	5	11	4
(Austria) D Habesohn (Austria) R Gardos	11	5	11	6	11
(Slovenia) D Jorgic (Czech Republic) T Polansky	11	6	10	6
5	(Germany) B Duda (Germany) D Qiu	9	11	12	11

Quarterfinals
(Austria) D Habesohn (Austria) R Gardos	10	13	7	11	2
5	(Germany) B Duda (Germany) D Qiu	12	11	11	6	11

==== Section 2 ====
Round of 24
(Singapore) C Chew (Singapore) E Poh	12	11	11
(Singapore) Beh K T (Singapore) L Tan	10	3	8
(France) A Cassin (France) E Lebesson	9	11	7	11	4
(Portugal) J Monteiro (Portugal) T Apolonia	11	6	11	7	11

Round of 16
4	(Spain) A Robles (Romania) O Ionescu	3	9	11
(Singapore) C Chew (Singapore) E Poh	11	11	13
(Portugal) J Monteiro (Portugal) T Apolonia	8	10	11	5
7	(China) Fan ZD (China) Wang CQ	11	12	9	11

Quarterfinals
(Singapore) C Chew (Singapore) E Poh	13	7	5	10
7	(China) Fan ZD (China) Wang CQ	11	11	11	12

=== Bottom Half ===
==== Section 3 ====
Round of 24
(Iran) N Alamian (Iran) N Alamiyan	11	12	11
(Singapore) J Chua (Singapore) K Pang	9	10	6
(Italy) M Bobocica (Italy) N Stoyanov	10	11	8	12	11
(Egypt) A Saleh (Egypt) K Assar	12	4	11	10	6

Round of 16
6	(Hungary) A Szudi (Hungary) N Ecseki	11	10	11	2	11
(Iran) N Alamian (Iran) N Alamiyan	9	12	9	11	9
(Italy) M Bobocica (Italy) N Stoyanov	4	9	12	3
3	(Japan) S Togami (Japan) Y Uda	11	11	10	11

Quarterfinals
6	(Hungary) A Szudi (Hungary) N Ecseki	8	12	7	7
3	(Japan) S Togami (Japan) Y Uda	11	10	11	11

==== Section 4 ====
Round of 24
(Sweden) A Kallberg (Sweden) T Moregard	11	13	12
(Senegal) I Diaw (Portugal) J Geraldo	2	11	10
(Chinese Taipei) Liao C-t (Chinese Taipei) Lin Y-j	11	7	11	9	6
(India) S Gnanasekaran (India) S K Achanta	7	11	5	11	11

Round of 16
8	(Chinese Taipei) Chen C-a (Chinese Taipei) Chuang C-y	8	8	11	11	11
(Sweden) A Kallberg (Sweden) T Moregard	11	11	7	4	1
(India) S Gnanasekaran (India) S K Achanta	7	7	6
2	(South Korea) Jang W-j (South Korea) Lim J-h	11	11	11

Quarterfinals
8	(Chinese Taipei) Chen C-a (Chinese Taipei) Chuang C-y	11	11	11
2	(South Korea) Jang W-j (South Korea) Lim J-h	7	7	3

== Women's doubles ==
=== Seeds ===
1. (China) Sun Yingsha / (China) Wang Manyu (champion)
2. (Japan) Hina Hayata / (Japan) Mima Ito (final)
3. (Puerto Rico) Adriana Diaz / (Puerto Rico) Melanie Diaz (round of 16)
4. (Germany) Nina Mittelham / (Germany) Sabine Winter (quarter-finals)
5. (Luxembourg) Sarah de Nutte / (Luxembourg) Xia Lian Ni (semi-finals)
6. (India) Archana Girish Kamath / (India) Manika Batra (quarter-finals)
7. (South Korea) Jeon Ji-hee / (South Korea) Yang Ha-eun (quarter-finals)
8. (Sweden) Christina Kallberg / (Sweden) Linda Bergstrom (round of 16)

=== Finals ===
Semifinals
1	(China) Sun Yingsha (China) Wang Manyu	11	11	11
5	(Luxembourg) Sarah de Nutte (Luxembourg) Xia Lian Ni	8	5	5
(Romania) Bernadette Szocs (Austria) Sofia Polcanova	5	11	13	13	9
2	(Japan) Hina Hayata (Japan) Mima Ito	11	8	15	11	11

Final
1	(China) Sun Yingsha (China) Wang Manyu	11	11	11
2	(Japan) Hina Hayata (Japan) Mima Ito	4	6	4

=== Top Half ===
==== Section 1 ====
Round of 24
(Netherlands) B Eerland (Monaco) X Yang	4	9	11	8
(Chinese Taipei) Cheng H-t (Chinese Taipei) Liu H-y	11	11	7	11
(Hungary) D Madarasz (Hungary) G Pota	11	7	9	12	11
(Italy) D Vivarelli (Italy) G Piccolin	5	11	11	10	4

Round of 16
1	(China) Sun YS (China) Wang MY	11	11	11
(Chinese Taipei) Cheng H-t (Chinese Taipei) Liu H-y	5	7	2
(Hungary) D Madarasz (Hungary) G Pota	7	5	9
7	(South Korea) Jeon J-h (South Korea) Yang H-e	11	11	11

Quarterfinals
1	(China) Sun YS (China) Wang MY	10	11	11	11
7	(South Korea) Jeon J-h (South Korea) Yang H-e	12	7	6	9

==== Section 2 ====
Round of 24
(Egypt) D Meshref (Egypt) Y Helmy	12	1	11	13	8
(Hong Kong) Doo H K (Hong Kong) Lee H C	10	11	8	15	11
(Brazil) B Takahashi (Brazil) C Kumahara	5	10	7
(Singapore) Lin Y (Singapore) Zeng J	11	12	11

Round of 16
4	(Germany) N Mittelham (Germany) S Winter	8	11	11	11
(Hong Kong) Doo H K (Hong Kong) Lee H C	11	6	7	9
(Singapore) Lin Y (Singapore) Zeng J	8	5	7
5	(Luxembourg) S de Nutte (Luxembourg) X L Ni	11	11	11

Quarterfinals
4	(Germany) N Mittelham (Germany) S Winter	13	7	10	8
5	(Luxembourg) S de Nutte (Luxembourg) X L Ni	11	11	12	11

=== Bottom Half ===
==== Section 3 ====
Round of 24
(Serbia) I Lupulesku (Serbia) S Surjan	2	8	4
(Romania) B Szocs (Austria) S Polcanova	11	11	11
(South Korea) Choi H-j (South Korea) Lee Z-o	11	11	11
(Serbia) A Todorovic (Croatia) M Jeger	7	8	7

Round of 16
8	(Sweden) C Kallberg (Sweden) L Bergstrom	3	9	8
(Romania) B Szocs (Austria) S Polcanova	11	11	11
(South Korea) Choi H-j (South Korea) Lee Z-o	10	11	13	11
3	(Puerto Rico) A Diaz (Puerto Rico) M Diaz	12	9	11	7

Quarterfinals
(Romania) B Szocs (Austria) S Polcanova	11	12	11
(South Korea) Choi H-j (South Korea) Lee Z-o	3	10	9

==== Section 4 ====
Round of 24
(Singapore) Goi R X (Singapore) Wong X R	11	11	11
(Singapore) Ser L Q (Singapore) Zhou J	6	5	9
(Slovakia) B Balazova (Czech Republic) H Matelova	11	11	11
(Singapore) P Koh (Singapore) Zhang W	7	8	4

Round of 16
6	(India) A G Kamath (India) M Batra	11	9	11	7	11
(Singapore) Goi R X (Singapore) Wong X R	7	11	9	11	5
(Slovakia) B Balazova (Czech Republic) H Matelova	6	4	14
2	(Japan) H Hayata (Japan) M Ito	11	11	16

Quarterfinals
6	(India) A G Kamath (India) M Batra	7	4	8
2	(Japan) H Hayata (Japan) M Ito	11	11	11

== Mixed doubles ==
=== Seeds ===
1. (Chinese Taipei) Lin Yun-ju / (Chinese Taipei) Cheng I-ching (final)
2. (China) Wang Chuqin / (China) Sun Yingsha (champion)
3. (France) Emmanuel Lebesson / (France) Jia Nan Yuan (semi-finals)
4. (Japan) Tomokazu Harimoto / (Japan) Hina Hayata (quarter-finals)

=== Finals ===
Semifinals
1	(Chinese Taipei) Lin Yun-ju (Chinese Taipei) Cheng I-ching	11	11	10	11
3	(France) Emmanuel Lebesson (France) Jia Nan Yuan	8	5	12	9
(Hong Kong) Wong Chun Ting (Hong Kong) Doo Hoi Kem	12	9	11	9
2	(China) Wang Chuqin (China) Sun Yingsha	14	11	4	11

Final
1	(Chinese Taipei) Lin Yun-ju (Chinese Taipei) Cheng I-ching	3	10	4
2	(China) Wang Chuqin (China) Sun Yingsha	11	12	11

=== Top Half ===
==== Section 1 ====
Round of 16
1	(Chinese Taipei) Lin Y-j (Chinese Taipei) Cheng I-c	11	11	14
(Singapore) C Chew (Singapore) Zeng J	9	8	12
(Brazil) V Ishiy (Brazil) B Takahashi	11	8	3	1
(India) S Gnanasekaran (India) M Batra	8	11	11	11

Quarterfinals
1	(Chinese Taipei) Lin Y-j (Chinese Taipei) Cheng I-c	11	11	11
(India) S Gnanasekaran (India) M Batra	8	3	6

==== Section 2 ====
Round of 16
3	(France) E Lebesson (France) J N Yuan	11	11	8	11	11
(Germany) D Qiu (Hong Kong) Lee H C	13	8	11	6	9
(Hong Kong) Ho K K (Germany) N Mittelham	11	9	11	8	11
(Slovakia) L Pistej (Slovakia) B Balazova	9	11	3	11	6

Quarterfinals
3	(France) E Lebesson (France) J N Yuan	11	11	11	11
(Hong Kong) Ho K K (Germany) N Mittelham	13	8	5	9

=== Bottom Half ===
==== Section 3 ====
Round of 16
(Germany) P Franziska (Germany) P Solja	7	8	8
(Hong Kong) Wong C T (Hong Kong) Doo H K	11	11	11
(South Korea) Jang W-j (South Korea) Jeon J-h	8	3	5
4	(Japan) T Harimoto (Japan) H Hayata	11	11	11

Quarterfinals
(Hong Kong) Wong C T (Hong Kong) Doo H K	11	11	11
4	(Japan) T Harimoto (Japan) H Hayata	9	6	6

==== Section 4 ====
Round of 16
(Romania) O Ionescu (Romania) B Szocs	11	11	11
(Singapore) K Pang (Singapore) Lin Y	2	9	3
(Egypt) O Assar (Egypt) D Meshref	4	3	10
2	(China) Wang CQ (China) Sun YS	11	11	12

Quarterfinals
(Romania) O Ionescu (Romania) B Szocs	4	8	9
2	(China) Wang CQ (China) Sun YS	11	11	11
