= Table tennis at the 2020 Summer Olympics – Women's singles =

Women's singles at the Games of the XXXII Olympiad
- Venue: Tokyo Metropolitan Gymnasium
- Date: 24–29 July 2021
- Competitors: 70 from 44 nations

Medalists
1st place, gold medalist(s)		Chen Meng	China
2nd place, silver medalist(s)		Sun Yingsha	China
3rd place, bronze medalist(s)		Mima Ito	Japan

The women's singles table tennis event was part of the table tennis programme at the 2020 Summer Olympics in Tokyo. The event took place from 24 July to 29 July 2021 at Tokyo Metropolitan Gymnasium.

== Schedule ==
Legend
P	Preliminary round	¼	Quarter-finals	½	Semi-finals	F	Final

Sat 24	Sun 25	Mon 26	Tue 27	Wed 28	Thu 29	
P				¼	½	F

== Seeds ==
The top 16 seeded players qualified directly to the third round.

1. Chen Meng (CHN) (champion, gold medalist)
2. Sun Yingsha (CHN) (final, silver medalist)
3. Mima Ito (JPN) (semifinals, bronze medalist)
4. Cheng I-ching (TPE) (third round)
5. Kasumi Ishikawa (JPN) (quarterfinals)
6. Feng Tianwei (SGP) (fourth round)
7. Jeon Ji-hee (KOR) (quarterfinals)
8. Doo Hoi Kem (HKG) (quarterfinals)
9. Adriana Díaz (PUR) (third round)
10. Sofia Polcanova (AUT) (fourth round)
11. Petrissa Solja (GER) (third round)
12. Han Ying (GER) (quarterfinals)
13. Chen Szu-yu (TPE) (fourth round)
14. Bernadette Szőcs (ROU) (third round)
15. Elizabeta Samara (ROU) (third round)
16. Britt Eerland (NED) (fourth round)

The players seeded from 17 to 32 qualified directly to the second round.

17. Minnie Soo Wai Yam (HKG) (second round)
18. Lily Zhang (USA) (third round)
19. Dina Meshref (EGY) (third round)
20. Margaryta Pesotska (UKR) (second round)
21. Zhang Mo (CAN) (fourth round)
22. Suthasini Sawettabut (THA) (fourth round)
23. Bruna Takahashi (BRA) (second round)
24. Ni Xialian (LUX) (second round)
25. Xiaoxin Yang (MON) (third round)
26. Yu Mengyu (SGP) (semifinals, fourth place)
27. Polina Mikhaylova (ROC) (second round)
28. Li Qian (POL) (second round)
29. Hana Matelová (CZE) (second round)
30. Georgina Póta (HUN) (second round)
31. Barbora Balážová (SVK) (second round)
32. Fu Yu (POR) (third round)

== Draw ==
=== Finals ===
Semifinals
1	Chen Meng (CHN)	11	11	11	11
26	Yu Mengyu (SGP)	6	8	7	6
3	Mima Ito (JPN)	3	9	6	4
2	Sun Yingsha (CHN)	11	11	11	11

Gold medal match
1	Chen Meng (CHN) (gold)	9	11	11	5	11	11
2	Sun Yingsha (CHN) (silver)	11	6	4	11	4	9
Bronze medal match
26	Yu Mengyu (SGP)	11	8	7	7	6
3	Mima Ito (JPN) (bronze)	6	11	11	11	11

=== Top half ===
==== Section 1 ====
Second round
30	G Póta (HUN)	9	12	7	11	9
48	R Moret (SUI)	11	14	11	7	11
21	Zhang M (CAN)	7	9	14	12	11	3	11
33	Y Noskova (ROC)	11	11	12	10	6	11	8
19	D Meshref (EGY)	15	10	11	11	7	13
47	N Partyka (POL)	13	12	9	4	11	11
24	Ni XL (LUX)	11	17	11	7	8	11	5
44	Shin YB (KOR)	2	19	5	11	11	8	11

Third round
1	Chen M (CHN)	11	11	11	11
48	R Moret (SUI)	3	6	2	7
11	P Solja (GER)	7	5	11	6	11	11	3
21	Zhang M (CAN)	11	11	9	11	6	8	11
16	B Eerland (NED)	9	3	7	11	11	11	11
19	D Meshref (EGY)	11	11	11	6	5	8	7
8	Doo H K (HKG)	12	11	8	8	11	11
44	Shin YB (KOR)	10	5	11	11	4	6

Fourth round
1	Chen M (CHN)	11	11	11	9	11
21	Zhang M (CAN)	7	6	9	11	5
16	B Eerland (NED)	13	5	8	9	8
8	Doo H K (HKG)	11	11	11	11	11

Quarterfinals
1	Chen M (CHN)	6	6	11	11	11	11
8	Doo H K (HKG)	11	11	6	9	1	8

==== Section 2 ====
Second round
29	H Matelová (CZE)	11	5	6	11	8	8
49	O Paranang (THA)	9	11	11	9	11	11
20	M Pesotska (UKR)	11	11	7	10	11	5	7
34	M Batra (IND)	4	4	11	12	8	11	11
31	B Balážová (SVK)	9	6	9	7
68	Ju Liu (USA)	11	11	11	11
26	Yu MY (SGP)	11	11	11	11
35	Shao JN (POR)	3	2	8	9

Third round
5	K Ishikawa (JPN)	11	5	11	6	11	11
49	O Paranang (THA)	5	11	4	11	4	8
10	S Polcanova (AUT)	11	11	11	11
34	M Batra (IND)	8	2	5	7
14	B Szőcs (ROU)	4	11	11	9	8	3
68	Ju Liu (USA)	11	6	6	11	11	11
4	Cheng I-c (TPE)	5	9	10	6
26	Yu MY (SGP)	11	11	12	11

Fourth round
5	K Ishikawa (JPN)	11	11	12	11
10	S Polcanova (AUT)	8	8	10	9
68	Ju Liu (USA)	9	9	9	11	11	8
26	Yu MY (SGP)	11	11	11	8	6	11

Quarterfinals
5	K Ishikawa (JPN)	11	5	12	6	2
26	Yu MY (SGP)	8	11	14	11	11

=== Bottom half ===
==== Section 3 ====
Second round
32	F Yu (POR)	11	11	11	11
52	S Mukherjee (IND)	3	3	5	5
22	S Sawettabut (THA)	11	11	11	11
42	M P Vega (CHI)	5	4	3	3
27	P Mikhaylova (ROC)	11	11	8	5	6	11	5
55	Liu J (AUT)	8	7	11	11	11	8	11
23	B Takahashi (BRA)	8	7	6	8
46	Yuan JN (FRA)	11	11	11	11

Third round
3	M Ito (JPN)	11	5	11	11	11
32	F Yu (POR)	9	11	5	4	5
15	E Samara (ROU)	7	6	11	8	2
22	S Sawettabut (THA)	11	11	4	11	11
9	A Díaz (PUR)	9	4	9	9
55	Liu J (AUT)	11	11	11	11
7	Jeon J-h (KOR)	12	11	8	11	8	8	11
46	Yuan JN (FRA)	10	4	11	9	11	11	4

Fourth round
3	M Ito (JPN)	11	11	11	11
22	S Sawettabut (THA)	7	6	9	7
55	Liu J (AUT)	1	12	3	3	4
7	Jeon J-h (KOR)	11	10	11	11	11

Quarterfinals
3	M Ito (JPN)	11	11	12	11
7	Jeon J-h (KOR)	5	1	10	6

==== Section 4 ====
Second round
17	M Soo W Y (HKG)	11	6	8	8	11	9
43	M Xiao (ESP)	7	11	11	11	8	11
28	Li Q (POL)	7	6	11	12	4	4
58	J F Lay (AUS)	11	11	5	10	11	11
18	L Zhang (USA)	13	11	11	11	11
60	O Edem (NGR)	15	2	2	8	6
25	XX Yang (MON)	11	6	11	11	11
66	P Trifonova (BUL)	3	11	5	4	0

Third round
6	Feng TW (SGP)	8	12	11	11	11
43	M Xiao (ESP)	11	10	5	2	4
12	Han Y (GER)	11	11	11	11
58	J F Lay (AUS)	9	9	7	8
13	Chen S-y (TPE)	11	11	11	12
18	L Zhang (USA)	8	7	6	10
2	Sun YS (CHN)	11	11	11	11
25	XX Yang (MON)	6	5	5	3

Fourth round
6	Feng TW (SGP)	11	7	9	11	8
12	Han Y (GER)	13	11	11	8	11
13	Chen S-y (TPE)	6	12	3	10
2	Sun YS (CHN)	11	14	11	12

Quarterfinals
12	Han Y (GER)	8	3	8	6
2	Sun YS (CHN)	11	11	11	11

== Preliminary rounds ==
=== Top half ===
==== Section 1 ====
Preliminary round
64	S Yee (FIJ)	5	11	3	6	8
67	C Edghill (GUY)	11	4	11	11	11

First round
48	R Moret (SUI)	11	6	11	7	11	14
56	J Yamada (BRA)	6	11	4	11	6	12
33	Y Noskova (ROC)	12	6	3	11	11	11
63	P Pavade (FRA)	10	11	11	7	9	9
47	N Partyka (POL)	11	11	11	11
62	M Bromley (AUS)	3	5	5	7
44	Shin YB (KOR)	11	11	11	12
67	C Edghill (GUY)	7	8	1	10

==== Section 2 ====
Preliminary round
53	O Oshonaike (NGR)	7	3	4	13	4
68	Ju Liu (USA)	11	11	11	11	11

First round
37	M Díaz (PUR)	11	6	8	7
49	O Paranang (THA)	13	11	11	11
34	M Batra (IND)	11	11	12	11
51	T-T Ho (GBR)	7	6	10	9
45	G Dvorak (ESP)	9	11	5	5	8
68	Ju Liu (USA)	11	4	11	11	11
35	Shao JN (POR)	8	9	10	11	11	11	11
57	C Källberg (SWE)	11	11	12	6	5	8	6

=== Bottom half ===
==== Section 3 ====
Preliminary round
61	F Garci (TUN)	11	6	10	6	7
69	B-E Batmunkh (MGL)	5	11	12	11	11
55	Liu J (AUT)	11	11	11	11
70	H Zaza (SYR)	4	9	3	5

First round
39	L Bergström (SWE)	11	9	13	11	3	9	5
52	S Mukherjee (IND)	5	11	11	9	11	11	11
42	M P Vega (CHI)	11	11	11	11
69	B-E Batmunkh (MGL)	8	9	4	7
38	H Haponova (UKR)	4	11	11	4	3	5
55	Liu J (AUT)	11	6	6	11	11	11
46	Yuan JN (FRA)	11	11	11	11
50	Y Abdel Razek (EGY)	3	5	5	6

==== Section 4 ====
Preliminary round
58	J F Lay (AUS)	11	11	11	14
65	D Fonseca (CUB)	5	7	5	12
54	S Hanffou (CMR)	11	8	6	5	10
66	P Trifonova (BUL)	8	11	11	11	12

First round
43	M Xiao (ESP)	11	11	11	7	11
59	A Lavrova (KAZ)	9	6	4	11	3
40	D Vivarelli (ITA)	7	11	4	10	2
58	J F Lay (AUS)	11	5	11	12	11
36	D Madarász (HUN)	8	9	9	11	4
60	O Edem (NGR)	11	11	11	9	11
41	S De Nutte (LUX)	11	6	11	11	10	9	8
66	P Trifonova (BUL)	6	11	4	8	12	11	11
