= 2020 Europe Top 16 Cup =

Tournament details
- Dates: 8–9 February 2020
- Edition: 49th
- Venue: Salle Omnisport du Pierrier
- Location: Montreux, Switzerland

Champions
- Men's singles: (Germany) Timo Boll
- Women's singles: (Germany) Petrissa Solja

The 2020 Europe Top 16 Cup (also referred to as the 2020 CCB Europe Top 16 Cup for sponsorship reasons) was a table tennis competition held from 8 to 9 February in Montreux, Switzerland, organised under the authority of the European Table Tennis Union (ETTU). It was the 49th edition of the event, and the fifth time that it had been held in Switzerland.

== Medallists ==
Event	Gold	Silver	Bronze
Men's Singles	(Germany) Timo Boll	(Slovenia) Darko Jorgić	(Austria) Robert Gardos
Women's Singles	(Germany) Petrissa Solja	(Netherlands) Britt Eerland	(Austria) Sofia Polcanova

== Men's singles ==
=== Seeding ===
Players were seeded according to the European ranking for January 2020.

1. (Sweden) Mattias Falck (quarterfinals)
2. (Germany) Dimitrij Ovtcharov (first round, withdrew)
3. (Germany) Timo Boll (champion)
4. (France) Simon Gauzy (first round)
5. (England) Liam Pitchford (quarterfinals)
6. (Belarus) Vladimir Samsonov (first round)
7. (Portugal) Marcos Freitas (quarterfinals)
8. (Denmark) Jonathan Groth (first round)
9. (Sweden) Kristian Karlsson (first round)
10. (Austria) Daniel Habesohn (first round)
11. (Croatia) Tomislav Pucar (semifinals)
12. (Austria) Robert Gardos (semifinals)
13. (Slovakia) Wang Yang (quarterfinals)
14. (Slovenia) Darko Jorgić (final)
15. (France) Emmanuel Lebesson (first round)
16. (Switzerland) Lionel Weber (first round)

=== Main draw ===
First round
1	(Sweden) Mattias Falck	3	13	12	11	7	14
15	(France) Emmanuel Lebesson	11	11	10	6	11	12
12	(Austria) Robert Gardos	11	11	7	4	11	11
8	(Denmark) Jonathan Groth	8	7	11	11	6	6
5	(England) Liam Pitchford	11	11	14	11
16	(Switzerland) Lionel Weber	7	8	12	7
9	(Sweden) Kristian Karlsson	11	9	9	4	10
3	(Germany) Timo Boll	8	11	11	11	12
4	(France) Simon Gauzy	11	9	11	9	13	7	10
13	(Slovakia) Wang Yang	8	11	6	11	11	11	12
14	(Slovenia) Darko Jorgić	8	11	11	11	12
6	(Belarus) Vladimir Samsonov	11	4	9	7	10
7	(Portugal) Marcos Freitas	11	11	11	11
10	(Austria) Daniel Habesohn	0	7	9	5
11	(Croatia) Tomislav Pucar	w/o
2	(Germany) Dimitrij Ovtcharov

Quarterfinals
1	(Sweden) Mattias Falck	8	11	11	9	5	8
12	(Austria) Robert Gardos	11	9	6	11	11	11
5	(England) Liam Pitchford	4	7	8	7
3	(Germany) Timo Boll	11	11	11	11
13	(Slovakia) Wang Yang	7	8	10	11	20
14	(Slovenia) Darko Jorgić	11	11	12	6	22
7	(Portugal) Marcos Freitas	11	9	11	6	14	12
11	(Croatia) Tomislav Pucar	4	11	7	11	16	14

Semifinals
12	(Austria) Robert Gardos	10	8	11	6	5
3	(Germany) Timo Boll	12	11	7	11	11
14	(Slovenia) Darko Jorgić	4	11	13	15	11
11	(Croatia) Tomislav Pucar	11	1	11	13	8

Final
3	(Germany) Timo Boll	8	12	11	11	11
14	(Slovenia) Darko Jorgić	11	10	5	7	9
Third place
12	(Austria) Robert Gardos	9	11	11	2	8	11	11
11	(Croatia) Tomislav Pucar	11	9	9	11	11	4	9

== Women's singles ==
=== Seeding ===
Players were seeded according to the European ranking for January 2020.

1. (Austria) Sofia Polcanova (semifinals)
2. (Germany) Petrissa Solja (champion)
3. (Romania) Bernadette Szőcs (first round)
4. (Germany) Han Ying (quarterfinals)
5. (Romania) Elizabeta Samara (quarterfinals)
6. (Sweden) Matilda Ekholm (first round)
7. (Ukraine) Margaryta Pesotska (semifinals)
8. (Russia) Polina Mikhaylova (first round)
9. (Luxembourg) Ni Xialian (quarterfinals)
10. (Netherlands) Britt Eerland (final)
11. (Czech Republic) Hana Matelová (first round)
12. (Slovakia) Barbora Balážová (quarterfinals)
13. (Poland) Natalia Partyka (first round)
14. (Russia) Yana Noskova (first round)
15. (Hungary) Dora Madarász (first round)
16. (Switzerland) Rachel Moret (first round)

=== Main draw ===
First round
1	(Austria) Sofia Polcanova	6	11	11	11	11
16	(Switzerland) Rachel Moret	11	7	7	5	5
12	(Slovakia) Barbora Balážová	11	13	11	6	9	11
6	(Sweden) Matilda Ekholm	8	11	9	11	11	6
8	(Russia) Polina Mikhaylova	7	5	4	13	6
9	(Luxembourg) Ni Xialian	11	11	11	11	11
10	(Netherlands) Britt Eerland	9	11	11	11	11
3	(Romania) Bernadette Szőcs	11	9	8	8	7
4	(Germany) Han Ying	12	11	11	11
11	(Czech Republic) Hana Matelová	10	8	2	6
15	(Hungary) Dora Madarász	4	9	13	11	4	10
7	(Ukraine) Margaryta Pesotska	11	11	11	9	11	12
5	(Romania) Elizabeta Samara	17	11	7	11	11
14	(Russia) Yana Noskova	15	7	11	3	5
13	(Poland) Natalia Partyka	7	4	8	6
2	(Germany) Petrissa Solja	11	11	11	11

Quarterfinals
1	(Austria) Sofia Polcanova	11	11	15	13
12	(Slovakia) Barbora Balážová	5	9	13	11
9	(Luxembourg) Ni Xialian	11	11	5	11	7	5
10	(Netherlands) Britt Eerland	13	6	11	5	11	11
4	(Germany) Han Ying	18	9	9	8	11	13	8
7	(Ukraine) Margaryta Pesotska	16	11	11	11	6	11	11
5	(Romania) Elizabeta Samara	9	6	11	11	11	9
2	(Germany) Petrissa Solja	11	11	13	9	9	11

Semifinals
1	(Austria) Sofia Polcanova	6	7	11	8	9
10	(Netherlands) Britt Eerland	11	11	6	11	11
7	(Ukraine) Margaryta Pesotska	3	12	6	14	7
2	(Germany) Petrissa Solja	11	10	11	16	11

Final
10	(Netherlands) Britt Eerland	11	11	9	5	8	7
2	(Germany) Petrissa Solja	8	6	11	11	11	11
Third place
1	(Austria) Sofia Polcanova	8	9	11	11	11	11
7	(Ukraine) Margaryta Pesotska	11	11	7	6	8	5

== See also ==
- 2020 ITTF-ATTU Asian Cup
- 2020 ITTF Pan-America Cup
