= 2024 Europe Top 16 Cup =

Table tennis competition in Switzerland

Tournament details
- Dates: 20–21 January 2024
- Edition: 53rd
- Venue: Salle Omnisport du Pierrier
- Location: Montreux, Switzerland

The 2024 Europe Top 16 Cup was a table tennis competition that took place on 20 and 21 January 2024 in Montreux, Switzerland, organised under the authority of the European Table Tennis Union (ETTU).

France's Jia Nan Yuan won her first title and Slovenia's Darko Jorgić won his third title. Jorgić was the fourth player to win three times consecutively after Beatrix Kisházi (1971–73), Ni Xialian (1996–98), and Dimitrij Ovtcharov (2015–17).

== Participants ==
=== Men's singles ===
1. (France) Felix Lebrun
2. (Germany) Dang Qiu
3. (Germany) Dimitrij Ovtcharov
4. (Slovenia) Darko Jorgić
5. (Sweden) Anton Källberg
6. (Portugal) Marcos Freitas
7. (Sweden) Truls Möregårdh
8. (France) Alexis Lebrun
9. (England) Liam Pitchford
10. (Denmark) Jonathan Groth
11. (Denmark) Anders Lind
12. (Portugal) João Geraldo
13. (Spain) Álvaro Robles
14. (Croatia) Tomislav Pucar
15. (Ukraine) Yaroslav Zhmudenko
16. (Switzerland) Loic Stoll

=== Women's singles ===
1. (Romania) Bernadette Szőcs
2. (Austria) Sofia Polcanova
3. (Germany) Nina Mittelham
4. (France) Jia Nan Yuan
5. (Sweden) Linda Bergström
6. (Romania) Elizabeta Samara
7. (Germany) Xiaona Shan
8. (France) Prithika Pavade
9. (Luxembourg) Ni Xialian
10. (Portugal) Jieni Shao
11. (Portugal) Yu Fu
12. (Spain) María Xiao
13. (Poland) Natalia Bajor
14. (Slovakia) Tatiana Kukulkova
15. (Slovakia) Barbora Balážová
16. (Switzerland) Rachel Moret

== Medalists ==
Event	Gold	Silver	Bronze
Men's singles	Darko Jorgić (SLO)	Truls Möregårdh (SWE)	Marcos Freitas (POR)
Men's singles	Darko Jorgić (SLO)	Truls Möregårdh (SWE)	Alexis Lebrun (FRA)
Women's singles	Jia Nan Yuan (FRA)	Sofia Polcanova (AUT)	Bernadette Szőcs (ROU)
Women's singles	Jia Nan Yuan (FRA)	Sofia Polcanova (AUT)	Nina Mittelham (GER)
