= Darko Jorgić =

Slovenian table tennis player

Personal information
- Nationality: Slovenian
- Born: 30 July 1998 (age 28) Trbovlje, Slovenia
- Height: 182 cm (6 ft 0 in)

Sport
- Sport: Table tennis
- Playing style: Righthanded shakehand grip
- Highest ranking: 6 (3 May 2022)
- Current ranking: 13 (2 November 2026)
Medal record
Men's table tennis
Representing Slovenia
European Championships
Silver medal – second place	2022 Munich	Singles
Bronze medal – third place	2017 Luxembourg City	Team
Bronze medal – third place	2025 Zadar	Team
Europe Top-16
Gold medal – first place	2022 Montreux	Singles
Gold medal – first place	2023 Montreux	Singles
Gold medal – first place	2024 Montreux	Singles
Silver medal – second place	2020 Montreux	Singles
Silver medal – second place	2025 Montreux	Singles
Silver medal – second place	2026 Montreux	Singles
Mediterranean Games
Gold medal – first place	2018 Tarragona	Singles
Gold medal – first place	2018 Tarragona	Team
Gold medal – first place	2022 Oran	Team

Darko Jorgić (born 30 July 1998 in Trbovlje) is a Slovenian table tennis player. He represented his country at the 2020 Summer Olympics in Tokyo and won three Europe Top-16 Championships.

== Career ==
=== 2021 ===
Jorgić has been in the Top 20 in the world continuously since 2020. He upset Liam Pitchford in a tight 4–2 match (last four games were all decided by two points) in the round of 32 in the men's singles event at the Tokyo Olympics. In the round of 16, Jorgić pulled off the biggest upset of the tournament as he defeated Tomokazu Harimoto to advance into the quarter-finals.

== Playing Style ==
Jorgić has a unique serve as he likes to serve with his backhand from the far forehand corner. This allows him to give wide angles to his opponent's short forehand and sets up his big backhand for the third ball.

== Overview of titles and successes ==
=== Singles ===
Year	Tournament	Final opponent	Score	Ref
2018	Mediterranean Games	(Spain) Jesús Cantero	4–0	
2022	Europe Top-16	(Sweden) Truls Möregårdh	4–3	
2023	Europe Top-16	(Germany) Dang Qiu	4–2	
2024	Europe Top-16	(Sweden) Truls Möregårdh	4–1	
2024	WTT Contender Lima	(Germany) Patrick Franziska	4–0	
2026	WTT Contender Skopje	(United States) Kanak Jha	4–2	

== Major competitions ==
=== Olympic Games ===
Year	Round	Final position
(Japan) 2020	Quarterfinals	5th - 8th
(France) 2024	Round of 16	9th - 16th

=== World Championships ===
Year	Round	Final position
(Germany) 2017	First round	65th - 128th
(Hungary) 2019	Second round	33rd - 64th
(United States) 2021	Fourth round	9th - 16th
(South Africa) 2023	Fourth round	9th - 16th
(Qatar) 2025	Fourth round	9th - 16th

=== European Championships ===
Year	Round	Final position
(Hungary) 2016	Round of 64	33rd - 64th
(Spain) 2018	Round of 32	17th - 32nd
(Poland) 2020	Round of 32	17th - 32nd
(Germany) 2022	Final	2nd place, silver medalist(s)
(Austria) 2024	Round of 16	9th - 16th
