= Europe Top-16 =

Table tennis tournament

Europe Top 16
- Most recent season or competition: 2026 Europe Top 16 Cup
- Formerly: Europe Top 12
- Sport: Table tennis
- Founded: 1971
- Singles entrants: 16 men; 16 women
- Confederation: European Table Tennis Union
- Most recent champions: Men: (France) Alexis Lebrun; Women: (Germany) Sabine Winter
- Most titles: Men: (Sweden) Jan-Ove Waldner (7) (Germany) Timo Boll (7); Women: (Hungary) Beatrix Kisházi (4) (Netherlands) Li Jiao (4)

The Europe Top 16, also known as the Europe Top 16 Cup and previously known as the Europe Top 12, is a table tennis tournament organised annually by the European Table Tennis Union (ETTU), featuring the highest-ranked players in Europe.

== History ==
The first event was held in 1971 in Zadar, Yugoslavia (now part of Croatia) as an experimental classification tournament. Twelve male players and six female players took part, with István Jónyer and Beatrix Kisházi, both from Hungary, winning the inaugural men's and women's competitions respectively. The tournament would go on to be held each year in different venues, and would become known as the Europe Top 12.

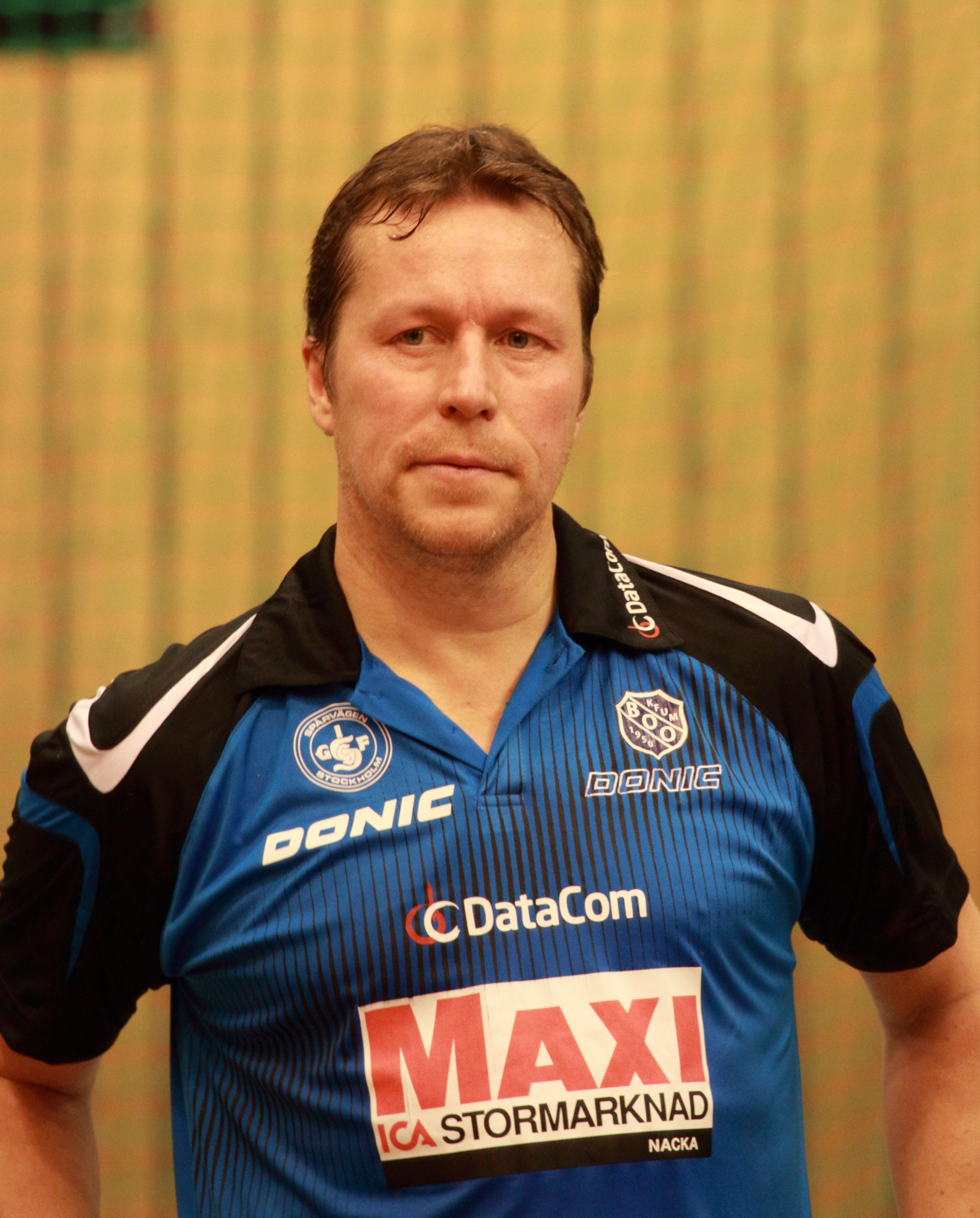
Jan-Ove Waldner

From 1971 until 1989, the tournament used a round-robin format; all players played each other once, with the champion being the player who accumulated the most wins. From 1990, there was a change of format; the twelve players were divided into two round-robin groups, with the top two players from each group progressing to semi-finals, followed by a final. At the 2001 tournament the twelve players were divided into four groups for the first time, with the group winners qualifying for the semi-finals, and from 2002 it was decided that the top two players from each group would qualify for quarter-finals, with knockout rounds to decide the winner. From 2015, the number of players qualifying for both the men's and women's events was increased to 16, and the tournament's name was changed to the Europe Top 16.

Sweden's Jan-Ove Waldner is the most successful player in the history of the men's event, winning the tournament seven times and finishing runner-up on a further four occasions between 1984 and 1996. Beatrix Kisházi of Hungary and Li Jiao of the Netherlands share the record for most wins in the women's event, with four wins each. Kisházi won the first three editions of the tournament from 1971 to 1973 and regained the title in 1977, while Li's four title wins came between 2007 and 2011.

== Qualification ==
Since 2019, the 16 participants in both the men's and the women's tournaments qualify as follows:

- The current European Champion.
- 14 additional players based on the European rankings at the time, subject to a maximum of two players from any association.
- One player from the host nation. If a player from the host nation has already qualified by right, the next eligible player in the rankings will qualify.

== Format ==
Since 2018, the format of the tournament has been a knockout played over two days. The semi-final losers play off for third and fourth place. The top three players in both the men's and the women's tournaments will be guaranteed a place at the Table Tennis World Cup, subject to a maximum of two players from any association.

== Results ==
=== Men ===
Year	Host City	Gold	Silver	Bronze
1971	Zadar	(Hungary) István Jónyer	(Socialist Federal Republic of Yugoslavia) Antun Stipančić	(Socialist Federal Republic of Yugoslavia) Dragutin Šurbek
1972	Zagreb	(Socialist Federal Republic of Yugoslavia) Antun Stipančić	(Sweden) Stellan Bengtsson	(Socialist Federal Republic of Yugoslavia) Dragutin Šurbek
1973	Böblingen	(Sweden) Stellan Bengtsson	(Socialist Federal Republic of Yugoslavia) Dragutin Šurbek	(Socialist Federal Republic of Yugoslavia) Antun Stipančić
1974	Trollhättan	(Hungary) István Jónyer	(Czechoslovakia) Milan Orlowski	(Sweden) Stellan Bengtsson
1975	Vienna	(Sweden) Kjell Johansson	(Socialist Federal Republic of Yugoslavia) Antun Stipančić	(Hungary) István Jónyer
1976	Lübeck	(Socialist Federal Republic of Yugoslavia) Dragutin Šurbek	(Sweden) Kjell Johansson	(Soviet Union) Sarkis Sarchayan
1977	Sarajevo	(Czechoslovakia) Milan Orlowski	(Socialist Federal Republic of Yugoslavia) Dragutin Šurbek	(France) Jacques Secrétin
1978	Prague	(Hungary) Gábor Gergely	(Czechoslovakia) Milan Orlowski	(Sweden) Stellan Bengtsson
1979	Kristianstad	(Socialist Federal Republic of Yugoslavia) Dragutin Šurbek	(England) Desmond Douglas	(France) Jacques Secrétin
1980	Munich	(Sweden) Stellan Bengtsson	(Sweden) Ulf Thorsell	(France) Jacques Secrétin
1981	Miskolc	(Hungary) Tibor Klampár	(Sweden) Stellan Bengtsson	(Socialist Federal Republic of Yugoslavia) Dragutin Šurbek
1982	Nantes	(Sweden) Mikael Appelgren	(Czechoslovakia) Milan Orlowski	(England) Desmond Douglas
1983	Cleveland	(Czechoslovakia) Milan Orlowski	(England) Desmond Douglas	(Sweden) Mikael Appelgren
1984	Bratislava	(Sweden) Jan-Ove Waldner	(Czechoslovakia) Jindřich Panský	(Sweden) Mikael Appelgren
1985	Barcelona	(Poland) Andrzej Grubba	(Czechoslovakia) Jindřich Panský	(Sweden) Mikael Appelgren
1986	Södertälje	(Sweden) Jan-Ove Waldner	(England) Desmond Douglas	(Sweden) Erik Lindh
1987	Basel	(England) Desmond Douglas	(Sweden) Jan-Ove Waldner	(Sweden) Jörgen Persson
1988	Ljubljana	(Sweden) Jan-Ove Waldner	(Sweden) Jörgen Persson	(Poland) Andrzej Grubba
1989	Charleroi	(Sweden) Jan-Ove Waldner	(Sweden) Erik Lindh	(Sweden) Jörgen Persson
1990	Hannover	(Sweden) Mikael Appelgren	(Sweden) Jan-Ove Waldner	(Poland) Andrzej Grubba
1991	's-Hertogenbosch	(Sweden) Erik Lindh	(Sweden) Jan-Ove Waldner	(Sweden) Jörgen Persson
1992	Vienna	(Sweden) Jörgen Persson	(Germany) Jörg Roßkopf	(Croatia) Zoran Primorac
1993	Copenhagen	(Sweden) Jan-Ove Waldner	(Sweden) Peter Karlsson	(Germany) Jörg Roßkopf
1993	Copenhagen	(Sweden) Jan-Ove Waldner	(Sweden) Peter Karlsson	(Belgium) Jean-Michel Saive
1994	Arezzo	(Belgium) Jean-Michel Saive	(Sweden) Jan-Ove Waldner	(Sweden) Peter Karlsson
1994	Arezzo	(Belgium) Jean-Michel Saive	(Sweden) Jan-Ove Waldner	(Croatia) Zoran Primorac
1995	Dijon	(Sweden) Jan-Ove Waldner	(Sweden) Erik Lindh	(France) Jean-Philippe Gatien
1995	Dijon	(Sweden) Jan-Ove Waldner	(Sweden) Erik Lindh	(Belgium) Jean-Michel Saive
1996	Charleroi	(Sweden) Jan-Ove Waldner	(Belgium) Jean-Michel Saive	(France) Jean-Philippe Gatien
1996	Charleroi	(Sweden) Jan-Ove Waldner	(Belgium) Jean-Michel Saive	(Italy) Yang Min
1997	Eindhoven	(France) Jean-Philippe Gatien	(Belarus) Vladimir Samsonov	(Croatia) Zoran Primorac
1997	Eindhoven	(France) Jean-Philippe Gatien	(Belarus) Vladimir Samsonov	(Sweden) Jan-Ove Waldner
1998	Halmstad	(Belarus) Vladimir Samsonov	(Sweden) Peter Karlsson	(Belgium) Jean-Michel Saive
1998	Halmstad	(Belarus) Vladimir Samsonov	(Sweden) Peter Karlsson	(Sweden) Jan-Ove Waldner
1999	Split	(Belarus) Vladimir Samsonov	(France) Christophe Legoût	(France) Jean-Philippe Gatien
1999	Split	(Belarus) Vladimir Samsonov	(France) Christophe Legoût	(Greece) Kalinikos Kreanga
2000	Alassio	(Austria) Werner Schlager	(Italy) Yang Min	(France) Jean-Philippe Gatien
2000	Alassio	(Austria) Werner Schlager	(Italy) Yang Min	(Germany) Jörg Roßkopf
2001	Wels	(Belarus) Vladimir Samsonov	(Sweden) Peter Karlsson	(Czech Republic) Petr Korbel
2001	Wels	(Belarus) Vladimir Samsonov	(Sweden) Peter Karlsson	(Belgium) Jean-Michel Saive
2002	Rotterdam	(Germany) Timo Boll	(Belarus) Vladimir Samsonov	(France) Patrick Chila
2002	Rotterdam	(Germany) Timo Boll	(Belarus) Vladimir Samsonov	(France) Damien Éloi
2003	Saarbrücken	(Germany) Timo Boll	(Belarus) Vladimir Samsonov	(Denmark) Michael Maze
2003	Saarbrücken	(Germany) Timo Boll	(Belarus) Vladimir Samsonov	(Austria) Werner Schlager
2004	Frankfurt	(Denmark) Michael Maze	(Austria) Werner Schlager	(Czech Republic) Petr Korbel
2004	Frankfurt	(Denmark) Michael Maze	(Austria) Werner Schlager	(Russia) Alexey Smirnov
2005	Rennes	(Russia) Alexey Smirnov	(Belarus) Vladimir Samsonov	(Germany) Timo Boll
2005	Rennes	(Russia) Alexey Smirnov	(Belarus) Vladimir Samsonov	(France) Damien Éloi
2006	Copenhagen	(Germany) Timo Boll	(Austria) Werner Schlager	(Denmark) Michael Maze
2006	Copenhagen	(Germany) Timo Boll	(Austria) Werner Schlager	(Croatia) Zoran Primorac
2007	Arezzo	(Belarus) Vladimir Samsonov	(Greece) Kalinikos Kreanga	(Croatia) Zoran Primorac
2007	Arezzo	(Belarus) Vladimir Samsonov	(Greece) Kalinikos Kreanga	(Russia) Alexey Smirnov
2008	Frankfurt	(Austria) Werner Schlager	(Belarus) Vladimir Samsonov	(Belgium) Jean-Michel Saive
2008	Frankfurt	(Austria) Werner Schlager	(Belarus) Vladimir Samsonov	(Russia) Alexey Smirnov
2009	Düsseldorf	(Germany) Timo Boll	(Belarus) Vladimir Samsonov	(Greece) Kalinikos Kreanga
2009	Düsseldorf	(Germany) Timo Boll	(Belarus) Vladimir Samsonov	(Denmark) Michael Maze
2010	Düsseldorf	(Germany) Timo Boll	(Belarus) Vladimir Samsonov	(Austria) Chen Weixing
2010	Düsseldorf	(Germany) Timo Boll	(Belarus) Vladimir Samsonov	(Greece) Kalinikos Kreanga
2011	Liège	(Greece) Kalinikos Kreanga	(Belarus) Vladimir Samsonov	(Austria) Werner Schlager
2011	Liège	(Greece) Kalinikos Kreanga	(Belarus) Vladimir Samsonov	(Russia) Alexey Smirnov
2012	Lyon	(Germany) Dimitrij Ovtcharov	(Russia) Kirill Skachkov	(Austria) Chen Weixing
2012	Lyon	(Germany) Dimitrij Ovtcharov	(Russia) Kirill Skachkov	(Belarus) Vladimir Samsonov
2014	Lausanne	(Portugal) Marcos Freitas	(Denmark) Michael Maze	(Germany) Dimitrij Ovtcharov
2015	Baku	(Germany) Dimitrij Ovtcharov	(Portugal) Marcos Freitas	(Greece) Panagiotis Gionis
2016	Gondomar	(Germany) Dimitrij Ovtcharov	(Portugal) João Monteiro	(Russia) Alexander Shibaev
2017	Antibes	(Germany) Dimitrij Ovtcharov	(Russia) Alexander Shibaev	(France) Simon Gauzy
2018	Montreux	(Germany) Timo Boll	(Germany) Dimitrij Ovtcharov	(Denmark) Jonathan Groth
2019	Montreux	(Germany) Dimitrij Ovtcharov	(Belarus) Vladimir Samsonov	(Germany) Timo Boll
2020	Montreux	(Germany) Timo Boll	(Slovenia) Darko Jorgić	(Austria) Robert Gardos
2021	Thessaloniki	(Germany) Patrick Franziska	(Portugal) Marcos Freitas	(Sweden) Mattias Falck
2021	Thessaloniki	(Germany) Patrick Franziska	(Portugal) Marcos Freitas	(France) Emmanuel Lebesson
2022	Montreux	(Slovenia) Darko Jorgić	(Sweden) Truls Möregårdh	(Germany) Timo Boll
2022	Montreux	(Slovenia) Darko Jorgić	(Sweden) Truls Möregårdh	(Germany) Patrick Franziska
2023	Montreux	(Slovenia) Darko Jorgić	(Germany) Dang Qiu	(Germany) Dimitrij Ovtcharov
2023	Montreux	(Slovenia) Darko Jorgić	(Germany) Dang Qiu	(England) Liam Pitchford
2024	Montreux	(Slovenia) Darko Jorgić	(Sweden) Truls Möregårdh	(France) Alexis Lebrun
2024	Montreux	(Slovenia) Darko Jorgić	(Sweden) Truls Möregårdh	(Portugal) Marcos Freitas
2025	Montreux	(France) Alexis Lebrun	(Slovenia) Darko Jorgić	(Sweden) Truls Möregårdh
2025	Montreux	(France) Alexis Lebrun	(Slovenia) Darko Jorgić	(Germany) Patrick Franziska
2026	Montreux	(France) Alexis Lebrun	(Slovenia) Darko Jorgić	(Germany) Benedikt Duda
2026	Montreux	(France) Alexis Lebrun	(Slovenia) Darko Jorgić	(France) Felix Lebrun

=== Women ===
Year	Host City	Gold	Silver	Bronze
1971	Zadar	(Hungary) Beatrix Kisházi	(Czechoslovakia) Ilona Voštová	(Czechoslovakia) Alice Grofová
1972	Zagreb	(Hungary) Beatrix Kisházi	(Romania) Maria Alexandru	(Soviet Union) Zoja Rudnova
1973	Böblingen	(Hungary) Beatrix Kisházi	(Hungary) Judit Magos	(Czechoslovakia) Ilona Voštová
1974	Trollhättan	(Soviet Union) Zoja Rudnova	(Romania) Maria Alexandru	(Hungary) Judit Magos
1975	Vienna	(Sweden) Ann-Christin Hellman	(West Germany) Wiebke Hendriksen	(Hungary) Henriette Lotaller
1976	Lübeck	(Sweden) Ann-Christin Hellman	(Czechoslovakia) Ilona Uhlíková-Voštová	(Socialist Federal Republic of Yugoslavia) Eržebet Palatinuš
1977	Sarajevo	(Hungary) Beatrix Kisházi	(England) Jill Hammersley	(Czechoslovakia) Ilona Uhlíková-Voštová
1978	Prague	(England) Jill Hammersley	(Netherlands) Bettine Vriesekoop	(Soviet Union) Valentina Popova
1979	Kristianstad	(Hungary) Gabriella Szabó	(Romania) Maria Alexandru	(Socialist Federal Republic of Yugoslavia) Eržebet Palatinuš
1980	Munich	(England) Jill Hammersley	(Netherlands) Bettine Vriesekoop	(Hungary) Gabriella Szabó
1981	Miskolc	(England) Jill Hammersley	(Netherlands) Bettine Vriesekoop	(Soviet Union) Valentina Popova
1982	Nantes	(Netherlands) Bettine Vriesekoop	(England) Jill Hammersley	(Czechoslovakia) Marie Hrachová
1983	Cleveland	(Romania) Olga Nemeș	(Soviet Union) Fliura Bulatova	(Netherlands) Bettine Vriesekoop
1984	Bratislava	(Czechoslovakia) Marie Hrachová	(Netherlands) Bettine Vriesekoop	(Soviet Union) Valentina Popova
1985	Barcelona	(Netherlands) Bettine Vriesekoop	(Hungary) Zsuzsa Oláh	(Czechoslovakia) Marie Hrachová
1986	Södertälje	(Soviet Union) Fliura Bulatova	(West Germany) Olga Nemeș	(Bulgaria) Daniela Guergeltcheva
1987	Basel	(Hungary) Csilla Bátorfi	(Hungary) Edit Urban	(Soviet Union) Fliura Bulatova
1988	Ljubljana	(Soviet Union) Fliura Bulatova	(Netherlands) Bettine Vriesekoop	(West Germany) Olga Nemeș
1989	Charleroi	(West Germany) Olga Nemeș	(Hungary) Csilla Bátorfi	(Bulgaria) Daniela Guergeltcheva
1990	Hannover	(Hungary) Gabriella Wirth	(West Germany) Olga Nemeș	(France) Xiaoming Wang-Dréchou
1991	's-Hertogenbosch	(Netherlands) Mirjam Hooman	(Hungary) Gabriella Wirth	(Netherlands) Bettine Vriesekoop
1992	Vienna	(Hungary) Csilla Bátorfi	(Sweden) Marie Svensson	(Romania) Otilia Bădescu
1993	Copenhagen	(Romania) Emilia Ciosu	(Germany) Olga Nemeș	(Romania) Otilia Bădescu
1993	Copenhagen	(Romania) Emilia Ciosu	(Germany) Olga Nemeș	(Sweden) Åsa Svensson
1994	Arezzo	(Germany) Jie Schöpp	(Romania) Otilia Bădescu	(Netherlands) Mirjam Hooman
1994	Arezzo	(Germany) Jie Schöpp	(Romania) Otilia Bădescu	(Germany) Nicole Struse
1995	Dijon	(Romania) Otilia Bădescu	(Romania) Emilia Ciosu	(Germany) Jie Schöpp
1995	Dijon	(Romania) Otilia Bădescu	(Romania) Emilia Ciosu	(Germany) Nicole Struse
1996	Charleroi	(Luxembourg) Ni Xialian	(Hungary) Csilla Bátorfi	(Germany) Nicole Struse
1996	Charleroi	(Luxembourg) Ni Xialian	(Hungary) Csilla Bátorfi	(Netherlands) Bettine Vriesekoop
1997	Eindhoven	(Luxembourg) Ni Xialian	(Germany) Jie Schöpp	(Romania) Otilia Bădescu
1997	Eindhoven	(Luxembourg) Ni Xialian	(Germany) Jie Schöpp	(Germany) Olga Nemeș
1998	Halmstad	(Luxembourg) Ni Xialian	(Germany) Nicole Struse	(Hungary) Csilla Bátorfi
1998	Halmstad	(Luxembourg) Ni Xialian	(Germany) Nicole Struse	(Sweden) Marie Svensson
1999	Split	(Germany) Qianhong Gotsch	(Germany) Jing Tian-Zörner	(Croatia) Tamara Boroš
1999	Split	(Germany) Qianhong Gotsch	(Germany) Jing Tian-Zörner	(Luxembourg) Ni Xialian
2000	Alassio	(Germany) Qianhong Gotsch	(Romania) Mihaela Steff	(Luxembourg) Ni Xialian
2000	Alassio	(Germany) Qianhong Gotsch	(Romania) Mihaela Steff	(Germany) Jie Schöpp
2001	Wels	(Hungary) Csilla Bátorfi	(Luxembourg) Ni Xialian	(Romania) Otilia Bădescu
2001	Wels	(Hungary) Csilla Bátorfi	(Luxembourg) Ni Xialian	(Croatia) Tamara Boroš
2002	Rotterdam	(Croatia) Tamara Boroš	(Germany) Nicole Struse	(Luxembourg) Ni Xialian
2002	Rotterdam	(Croatia) Tamara Boroš	(Germany) Nicole Struse	(Belarus) Viktoria Pavlovich
2003	Saarbrücken	(Germany) Jie Schöpp	(Croatia) Tamara Boroš	(Russia) Galina Melnik
2003	Saarbrücken	(Germany) Jie Schöpp	(Croatia) Tamara Boroš	(Hungary) Krisztina Tóth
2004	Frankfurt	(Germany) Nicole Struse	(Germany) Jie Schöpp	(Croatia) Tamara Boroš
2004	Frankfurt	(Germany) Nicole Struse	(Germany) Jie Schöpp	(Austria) Liu Jia
2005	Rennes	(Austria) Liu Jia	(Hungary) Krisztina Tóth	(Netherlands) Li Jiao
2005	Rennes	(Austria) Liu Jia	(Hungary) Krisztina Tóth	(Romania) Mihaela Steff
2006	Copenhagen	(Croatia) Tamara Boroš	(Austria) Liu Jia	(Netherlands) Li Jiao
2006	Copenhagen	(Croatia) Tamara Boroš	(Austria) Liu Jia	(Romania) Mihaela Steff
2007	Arezzo	(Netherlands) Li Jiao	(Italy) Nikoleta Stefanova	(Austria) Liu Jia
2007	Arezzo	(Netherlands) Li Jiao	(Italy) Nikoleta Stefanova	(Romania) Mihaela Steff
2008	Frankfurt	(Netherlands) Li Jiao	(Poland) Li Qian	(Belarus) Viktoria Pavlovich
2008	Frankfurt	(Netherlands) Li Jiao	(Poland) Li Qian	(Germany) Wu Jiaduo
2009	Düsseldorf	(Poland) Li Qian	(Netherlands) Li Jie	(Austria) Liu Jia
2009	Düsseldorf	(Poland) Li Qian	(Netherlands) Li Jie	(Germany) Wu Jiaduo
2010	Düsseldorf	(Netherlands) Li Jiao	(Poland) Li Qian	(Netherlands) Li Jie
2010	Düsseldorf	(Netherlands) Li Jiao	(Poland) Li Qian	(Hungary) Krisztina Tóth
2011	Liège	(Netherlands) Li Jiao	(Belarus) Viktoria Pavlovich	(Turkey) Melek Hu
2011	Liège	(Netherlands) Li Jiao	(Belarus) Viktoria Pavlovich	(Netherlands) Li Jie
2012	Lyon	(Germany) Wu Jiaduo	(Netherlands) Li Jie	(Luxembourg) Ni Xialian
2012	Lyon	(Germany) Wu Jiaduo	(Netherlands) Li Jie	(Belarus) Viktoria Pavlovich
2014	Lausanne	(Austria) Liu Jia	(Belarus) Viktoria Pavlovich	(Netherlands) Li Jiao
2015	Baku	(Austria) Liu Jia	(Germany) Petrissa Solja	(Germany) Irene Ivancan
2016	Gondomar	(Spain) Shen Yanfei	(Turkey) Melek Hu	(Austria) Liu Jia
2017	Antibes	(Netherlands) Li Jie	(Germany) Petrissa Solja	(Germany) Sabine Winter
2018	Montreux	(Romania) Bernadette Szőcs	(Netherlands) Li Jie	(Romania) Elizabeta Samara
2019	Montreux	(Germany) Petrissa Solja	(Romania) Bernadette Szőcs	(Austria) Sofia Polcanova
2020	Montreux	(Germany) Petrissa Solja	(Netherlands) Britt Eerland	(Austria) Sofia Polcanova
2021	Thessaloniki	(Germany) Nina Mittelham	(Portugal) Fu Yu	(Czech Republic) Hana Matelová
2021	Thessaloniki	(Germany) Nina Mittelham	(Portugal) Fu Yu	(Romania) Bernadette Szőcs
2022	Montreux	(Germany) Han Ying	(Russia) Polina Mikhaylova	(Austria) Sofia Polcanova
2022	Montreux	(Germany) Han Ying	(Russia) Polina Mikhaylova	(Romania) Bernadette Szőcs
2023	Montreux	(Germany) Han Ying	(Austria) Sofia Polcanova	(Germany) Nina Mittelham
2023	Montreux	(Germany) Han Ying	(Austria) Sofia Polcanova	(Portugal) Shao Jieni
2024	Montreux	(France) Jia Nan Yuan	(Austria) Sofia Polcanova	(Romania) Bernadette Szőcs
2024	Montreux	(France) Jia Nan Yuan	(Austria) Sofia Polcanova	(Germany) Nina Mittelham
2025	Montreux	(Germany) Han Ying	(Romania) Elizabeta Samara	(Germany) Sabine Winter
2025	Montreux	(Germany) Han Ying	(Romania) Elizabeta Samara	(Germany) Xiaona Shan
2026	Montreux	(Germany) Sabine Winter	(Romania) Bernadette Szőcs	(Germany) Han Ying
2026	Montreux	(Germany) Sabine Winter	(Romania) Bernadette Szőcs	(France) Jia Nan Yuan

== Statistics ==
=== Multiple champions ===
Listed below are the players who have won the tournament on two or more occasions.

==== Men ====
Player	Total	Years
(Sweden) Jan-Ove Waldner	7	1984, 1986, 1988, 1989, 1993, 1995, 1996
(Germany) Timo Boll	7	2002, 2003, 2006, 2009, 2010, 2018, 2020
(Germany) Dimitrij Ovtcharov	5	2012, 2015, 2016, 2017, 2019
(Belarus) Vladimir Samsonov	4	1998, 1999, 2001, 2007
(Slovenia) Darko Jorgić	3	2022, 2023, 2024
(Hungary) István Jónyer	2	1971, 1974
(Sweden) Stellan Bengtsson	2	1973, 1980
(Socialist Federal Republic of Yugoslavia) Dragutin Šurbek	2	1976, 1979
(Czechoslovakia) Milan Orlowski	2	1977, 1983
(Sweden) Mikael Appelgren	2	1982, 1990
(Austria) Werner Schlager	2	2000, 2008
(France) Alexis Lebrun	2	2025, 2026

==== Women ====
Player	Total	Years
(Hungary) Beatrix Kisházi	4	1971, 1972, 1973, 1977
(Netherlands) Li Jiao	4	2007, 2008, 2010, 2011
(England) Jill Hammersley	3	1978, 1980, 1981
(Hungary) Csilla Bátorfi	3	1987, 1992, 2001
(Luxembourg) Ni Xialian	3	1996, 1997, 1998
(Austria) Liu Jia	3	2005, 2014, 2015
(Germany) Han Ying	3	2022, 2023, 2025
(Sweden) Ann-Christin Hellman	2	1975, 1976
(Netherlands) Bettine Vriesekoop	2	1982, 1985
(Romania) / (West Germany) Olga Nemeș	2	1983, 1989
(Soviet Union) Fliura Bulatova	2	1986, 1988
(Germany) Jie Schöpp	2	1994, 2003
(Germany) Qianhong Gotsch	2	1999, 2000
(Croatia) Tamara Boroš	2	2002, 2006
(Germany) Petrissa Solja	2	2019, 2020

=== All-time medal table ===
Rank	Nation	Gold	Silver	Bronze	Total
1	Germany (GER)	27	14	26	67
2	Sweden (SWE)	16	17	16	49
3	Hungary (HUN)	13	8	7	28
4	Netherlands (NED)	8	9	9	26
5	Austria (AUT)	5	5	12	22
6	Belarus (BLR)	4	11	4	19
7	Romania (ROU)	4	8	11	23
8	England (ENG)	4	5	2	11
9	France (FRA)	4	1	16	21
10	Czechoslovakia (TCH)	3	7	5	15
11	Yugoslavia (YUG)	3	4	6	13
12	Slovenia (SLO)	3	3	0	6
13	Soviet Union (URS)	3	1	6	10
14	Luxembourg (LUX)	3	1	4	8
15	Poland (POL)	2	2	2	6
16	Croatia (CRO)	2	1	8	11
17	Portugal (POR)	1	4	2	7
18	Russia (RUS)	1	3	6	10
19	Belgium (BEL)	1	1	5	7
20	Denmark (DEN)	1	1	4	6
20	Greece (GRE)	1	1	4	6
22	Spain (ESP)	1	0	0	1
23	Italy (ITA)	0	2	1	3
24	Turkey (TUR)	0	1	1	2
25	Czech Republic (CZE)	0	0	3	3
26	Bulgaria (BUL)	0	0	2	2
Totals (26 entries)		110	110	162	382

== See also ==
- Asian Cup
- PanAm Cup
- European Table Tennis Championships
- International Table Tennis Federation
