= 2023 Europe Top 16 Cup =

Tournament details
- Dates: 25–26 February 2023
- Edition: 52nd
- Venue: Salle Omnisport du Pierrier
- Location: Montreux, Switzerland

The 2023 Europe Top 16 Cup (also referred to as the 2023 CCB Europe Top 16 Cup for sponsorship reasons) was a table tennis competition that took place on 25 and 26 February 2023 in Montreux, Switzerland, organised under the authority of the European Table Tennis Union (ETTU).

Slovenia's Darko Jorgić and Germany's Han Ying both completed back-to-back victories in the event, having also won the titles in 2022.

== Medallists ==
Event	Gold	Silver	Bronze
Men's singles	Darko Jorgić (SLO)	Dang Qiu (GER)	Dimitrij Ovtcharov (GER)
Men's singles	Darko Jorgić (SLO)	Dang Qiu (GER)	Liam Pitchford (ENG)
Women's singles	Han Ying (GER)	Sofia Polcanova (AUT)	Nina Mittelham (GER)
Women's singles	Han Ying (GER)	Sofia Polcanova (AUT)	Shao Jieni (POR)
