= 2022 Europe Top 16 Cup =

Tournament details
- Dates: 26–27 February 2022
- Edition: 51st
- Location: Montreux, Switzerland

The 2022 Europe Top 16 Cup (also referred to as the 2022 CCB Europe Top 16 Cup for sponsorship reasons) is a table tennis competition to be held on 26th and 27th February 2022 in Montreux, Switzerland, organised under the authority of the European Table Tennis Union (ETTU).

== Medallists ==
Event	Gold	Silver	Bronze
Men's singles	Darko Jorgić (SLO)	Truls Möregårdh (SWE)	Timo Boll (GER)
Men's singles	Darko Jorgić (SLO)	Truls Möregårdh (SWE)	Patrick Franziska (GER)
Women's singles	Han Ying (GER)	Polina Mikhaylova (RUS)	Sofia Polcanova (AUT)
Women's singles	Han Ying (GER)	Polina Mikhaylova (RUS)	Bernadette Szőcs (ROU)
