= 2018 European Table Tennis Championships =

- Date: 18 – 23 September
- Location: Alicante, Spain
- Venue: Centro de Tecnificacion Deportiva
- European Table Tennis Championships

The 2018 European Table Tennis Championships were held in Alicante, Spain from 18 to 23 September 2018. The competition was held at Centro de Tecnificacion Deportiva.

== Medal summary ==
Event	Gold	Silver	Bronze
Men's singles	Timo Boll (GER)	Ovidiu Ionescu (ROM)	Patrick Franziska (GER) Kristian Karlsson (SWE)
Women's singles	Li Qian (POL)	Margaryta Pesotska (UKR)	Sofia Polcanova (AUT) Katarzyna Grzybowska-Franc (POL)
Men's doubles	Daniel Habesohn (AUT); Robert Gardos (AUT)	Mattias Falck (SWE); Kristian Karlsson (SWE)	Patrick Franziska (GER); Jonathan Groth (DEN) Ruwen Filus (GER); Ricardo Walther (GER)
Women's doubles	Nina Mittelham (GER); Kristin Lang (GER)	Sofia Polcanova (AUT); Yana Noskova (RUS)	Matilda Ekholm (SWE); Georgina Póta (HUN) Ni Xialian (LUX); Sarah de Nutte (LUX)
Mixed doubles	Ruwen Filus (GER); Han Ying (GER)	Stefan Fegerl (AUT); Sofia Polcanova (AUT)	Patrick Franziska (GER); Petrissa Solja (GER) Aleksandar Karakašević (SRB); Rūta Paškauskienė (LTU)

== Medal table ==
Rank	nation	Gold	Silver	Bronze	Total
1	Germany (GER)	3	0	3.5	6.5
2	Austria (AUT)	1	1.5	1	3.5
3	Poland (POL)	1	0	1	2
4	Sweden (SWE)	0	1	1.5	2.5
5	Romania (ROM)	0	1	0	1
5	Ukraine (UKR)	0	1	0	1
7	Russia (RUS)	0	0.5	0	0.5
8	Luxembourg (LUX)	0	0	1	1
9	Denmark (DEN)	0	0	0.5	0.5
9	Hungary (HUN)	0	0	0.5	0.5
9	Lithuania (LTU)	0	0	0.5	0.5
9	Serbia (SRB)	0	0	0.5	0.5
Totals (12 entries)		5	5	10	20
