= Beatrix Kisházi =

Hungarian table tennis player

Beatrix Kisházi (born October 13, 1946, Budapest) is a retired Hungarian table tennis player. She holds the record that winning four titles in the Europe Top-12 tournament.

== Career ==
Kisházi was the winner of the first edition Europe Top-12 tournament in 1971. In the finals she beat the Czech player Ilona Vostová. The next two years she defended her title successfully in successive finals against the Romanian Alexandru Maria and her compatriot Judit Magos. Four years later Kisházi appeared on stage again and became the champion once more. In that year she defeated English player Jill Hammersley in the final, who was going to win the tournament three times in the next four years.

Kisházi represented Hungary in seven World Championships, six Europe Top-12 tournaments and six European Championships.

== Honours ==
- Winner of Europe Top-12 in 1971, 1972, 1973 and 1977
- Winner of European Championships - National teams in 1972, 1978 and 1982
- Second runners-up of World Cup - National teams in 1967
- Last sixteen of World Cup singles in 1969, 1973 and 1976
