= Juan Liu =

American table tennis player

Personal information
- Nationality: American
- Born: February 14, 1985 (age 41) Wuhan, China
- Height: 5 ft 6 in (1.68 m)
- Weight: 120 lb (54 kg)

Sport
- Sport: Table tennis
- Club: New York Indoor Sports Club

Juan Liu (born February 14, 1985) is an American table tennis player, who was born in and previously competed for China. She is a competitor at the 2020 Summer Olympics.
