= María Xiao =

Spanish table tennis player (born 1994)

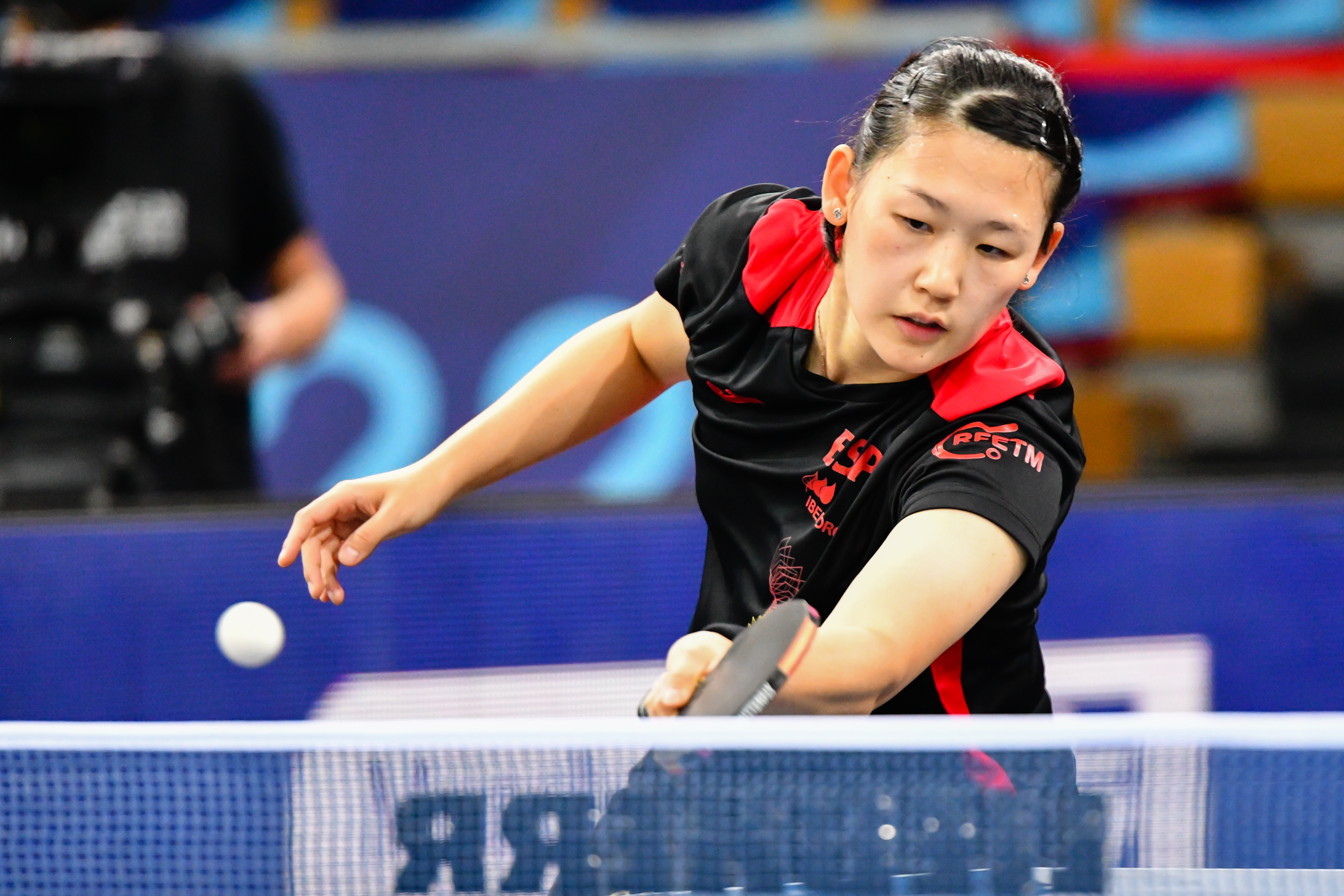
- Xiao representing Spain in 2022

Personal information
- Full name: María Xiao Yao
- Nationality: Portugal (before 2012); Spain (after 2012)
- Born: 19 May 1994 (age 32) Calella, Spain
- Height: 1.75 m (5 ft 9 in)
- Weight: 64 kg (141 lb)

Sport
- Sport: Table tennis
- Playing style: Left-handed shakehand grip
- Highest ranking: 49 (February 2025)
- Current ranking: 56 (28 September 2026)
Medal record
Women's table tennis
Representing Spain
European Championships
Gold medal – first place	2024 Linz	Mixed doubles
Bronze medal – third place	2022 Munich	Doubles
Bronze medal – third place	2024 Linz	Singles
Mediterranean Games
Gold medal – first place	2018 Tarragona	Team
Bronze medal – third place	2022 Oran	Singles

María Xiao
- Traditional Chinese: 肖瑤茜
- Simplified Chinese: 肖瑶茜
Transcriptions
Standard Mandarin
- Hanyu Pinyin: Xiāo Yáoqiàn

María Xiao Yao (born 19 May 1994) is a Spanish table tennis player. Born in Spain, she was raised in Portugal and initially represented Portugal before switching allegiances in 2012. She was Portugal's reserve player for the 2012 Summer Olympics in London, England, United Kingdom and represented Spain at the 2020 Summer Olympics in Tokyo, Japan.

== Early life ==
Xiao was born on 19 May 1994 in Calella, Catalonia, Spain. Her parents, Xiao Daili and Yao Li, are Chinese emigrants and former professional table-tennis players that moved to Spain to seek better opportunities in the sports. Xiao was raised in Madeira, Portugal when her parents moved there.

== Career ==
In 2010, Xiao represented Portugal at the 2010 Summer Youth Olympics in Singapore. She participated in the women's singles and the mixed doubles with Emilen Vanrossomme of Belgium. She advanced from round one of the women's singles after winning two of her three matches. However, she was eliminated in round two after losing two of her three matches. In the mixed doubles, Xiao and Vanrossomme finished runners-up in their group and advanced to round two where they lost to eventual bronze medalists Gu Yuting of China and Adem Hmam of Tunisia.

Xiao was Portugal's reserve player for the 2012 Summer Olympics in London, England, United Kingdom.

She represented Portugal before 2012 and Spain afterwards.

Xiao qualified to represent Spain at the delayed 2020 Summer Olympics in Tokyo, Japan where she participated in the women's singles. In the first round, she defeated Anastassiya Lavrova of Kazakhstan 11–9 11–6 11–4 7–11 11–3. She followed that up with a 7–11 11–6 11–8 11–8 8–11 11–9 against Minnie Soo of Hong Kong. Her run came to an end in the third round where she lost 8–11 12–10 11–5 11–2 11–4 against Feng Tianwei of Singapore.
