= Polina Mikhaylova =

Russian table tennis player

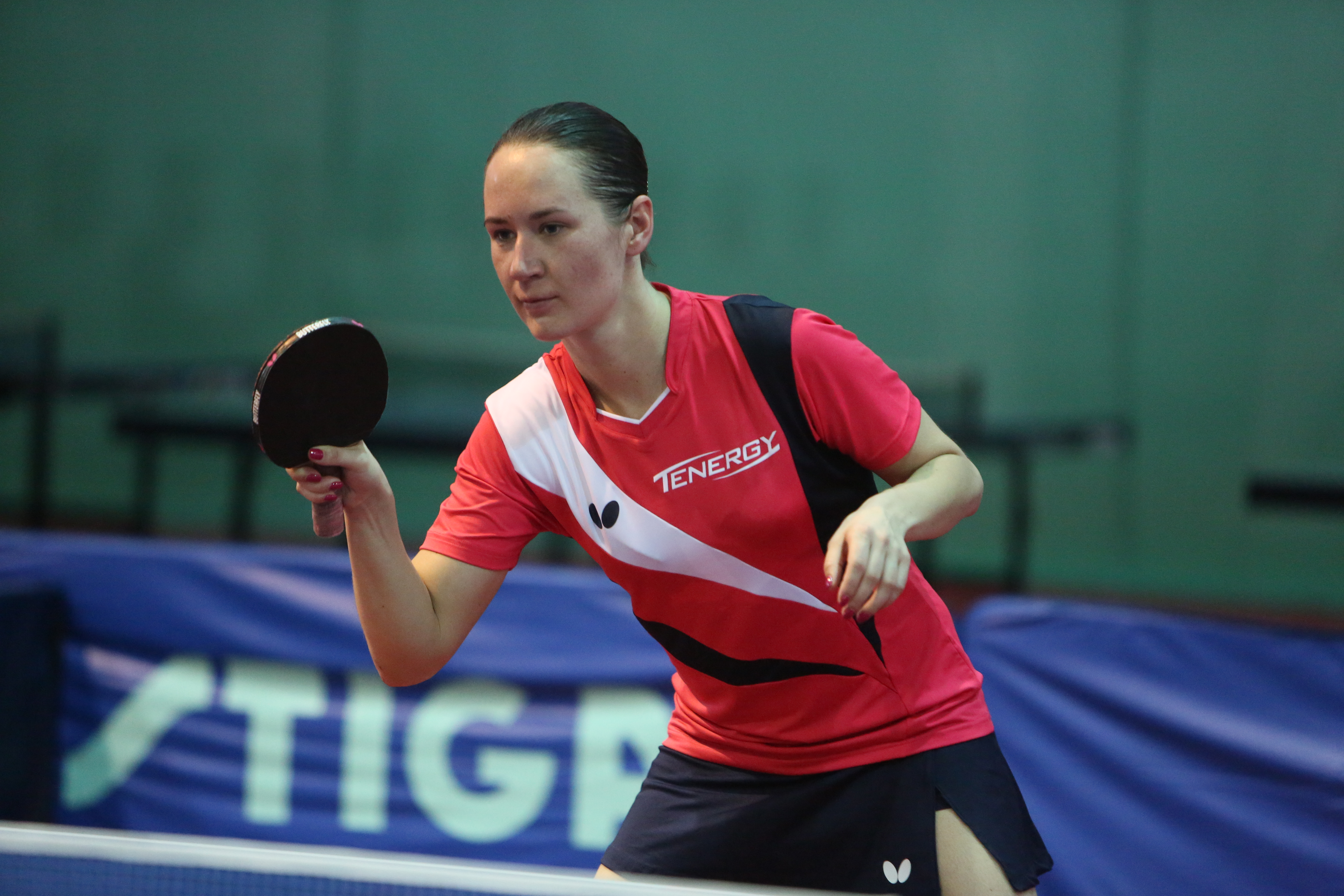

Personal information
- Full name: Polina Yuryevna Mikhaylova
- Nationality: (Russia) Russian
- Born: August 31, 1986 (age 39) Leningrad, RSFSR, USSR (now Saint Petersburg, Russia)
- Height: 1.68 m (5 ft 6 in)

Sport
- Sport: Table tennis
- Playing style: Right-handed, shakehand grip
- Highest ranking: 34 (June 2016)
Medal record
Women's table tennis
Representing Russia
European Championships
Bronze medal – third place	2013 Schwechat	Team
Bronze medal – third place	2015 Yekaterinburg	Team
Bronze medal – third place	2015 Yekaterinburg	Individual
Bronze medal – third place	2017 Luxembourg City	Team
Europe Top-16
Silver medal – second place	2022 Montreux	Singles

Polina Yuryevna Mikhaylova (Russian: Полина Юрьевна Михайлова; born 31 August 1986) is a Russian table tennis player. She competed at the 2016 Summer Olympics in the women's singles event, in which she was eliminated in the second round by Viktoria Pavlovich.
