= Petrissa Solja =

German table tennis player

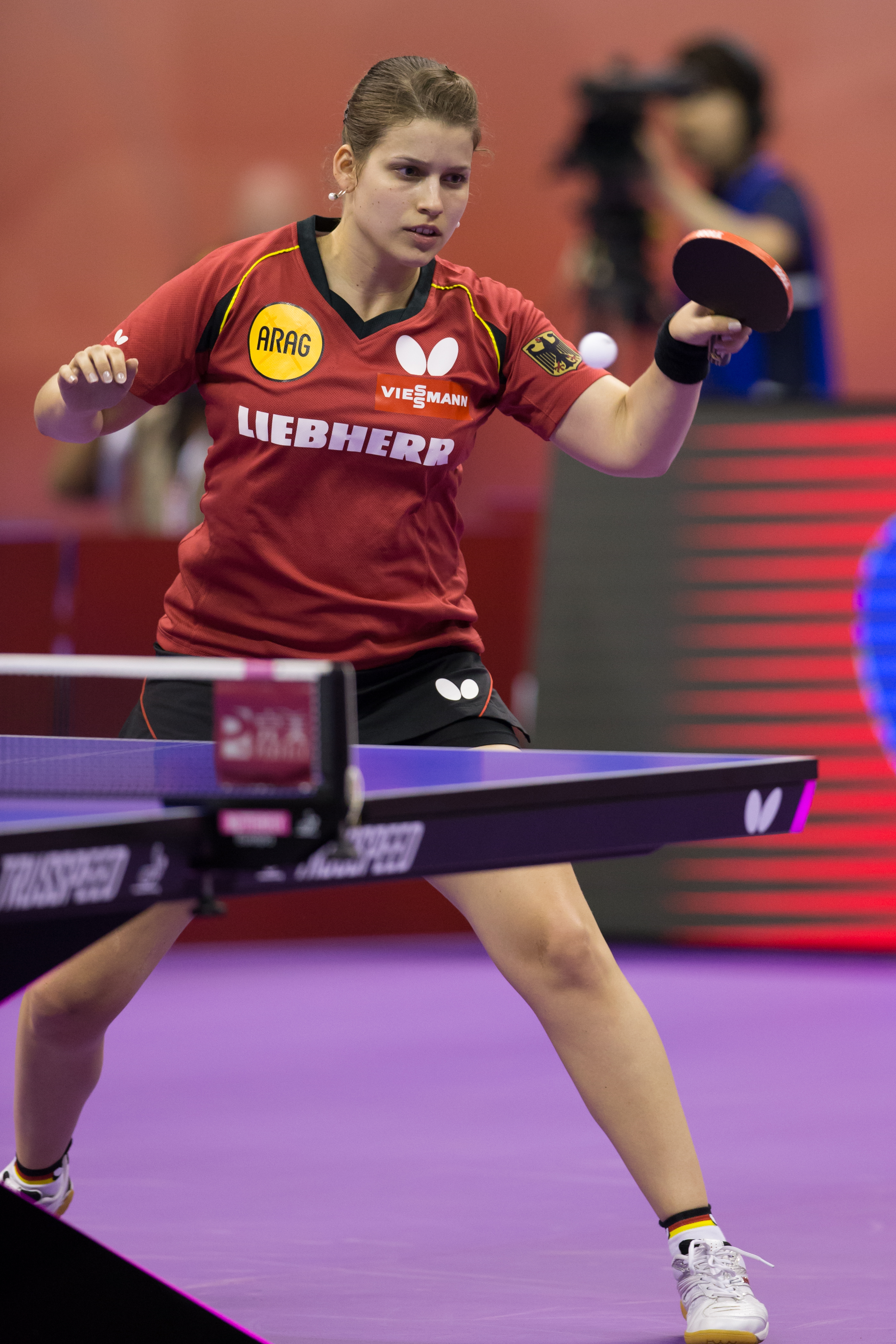

Personal information
- Nationality: German
- Born: 11 March 1994 (age 32) Kandel, Rhineland-Palatinate, Germany
- Height: 1.68 m (5 ft 6 in)
- Weight: 67 kg (148 lb)

Sport
- Sport: Table tennis
- Club: TTC Berlin Eastside (2014–2017); TSV Langstadt (2018–2022)
- Playing style: left shakehand grip
- Highest ranking: 13th (March 2016)
Medal record
Women's table tennis
Representing Germany
Olympic Games
Silver medal – second place	2016 Rio de Janeiro	Team
World Championships
Bronze medal – third place	2017 Düsseldorf	Mixed doubles
Bronze medal – third place	2019 Budapest	Mixed doubles
European Games
Gold medal – first place	2015 Baku	Team
Gold medal – first place	2019 Minsk	Team
Gold medal – first place	2019 Minsk	Mixed doubles
Europe Top-16
Gold medal – first place	2019 Montreux	Singles
Gold medal – first place	2020 Montreux	Singles

Petrissa Solja (born 11 March 1994) is a retired German table tennis player. Solja won silver in the team event in the 2016 Summer Olympics in Rio de Janeiro. She reached her highest world ranking of thirteenth in March 2016.

== Personal life ==
Solja was born in Kandel, Rhineland-Palatinate, Germany, into a table tennis-playing family; her mother, Dagmar Solja-Andruszko, played table tennis for ATSV Saarbrücken. Petrissa's two older sisters also play table tennis; her sister Amelie competed for Austria in the 2012 Summer Olympics (qualifying for citizenship due to grandmother).

Before the 2016 Summer Olympics in Rio de Janeiro, Solja posed together with swimmer Isabelle Härle, rower Julia Lier, cyclist Nadja Pries and injured pole vaulter Katharina Bauer for the German edition of Playboy.

== Table tennis career ==
Solja is coached by her father, Pavel, and plays left-handed with a shakehand grip.

As a junior player, Solja had considerable success. She won the Cadet singles events at the 2008 and 2009 European Youth Championships, beating Bernadette Szőcs and Yana Noskova in the two finals, respectively. Although she lost twice in the Junior singles finals to Bernadette Szőcs in 2011 and 2012, she was the most successful European player at the World Junior Championships in 2012, reaching the semi-finals of the girls' singles, and overall winning three bronze medals.

Solja was German young player of the year in 2012.

With Sabine Winter, she won the German national doubles championship in 2013 and 2014.

At the 2016 Summer Olympics, Solja won a silver medal in the women's team competition after being beaten, alongside partner Han Ying, by the Chinese team by 0 to 3. This result was the best by a European team in the women's team competition at the Olympics, and exceeded expectations given the team's third seed position. Solja lost in the third round of the women's singles to Ri Myong-sun of North Korea.

In 2017, Solja, alongside partner Fang Bo, won bronze in the mixed doubles at the World Championships in Düsseldorf, Germany. This was the first World Championship medal in mixed doubles for Germany since 1971. Later in 2017, Solja competed in the inaugural Ultimate Table Tennis League in India.

Solja played for German club TTC Berlin Eastside from 2014, before taking a break from table tennis at the end of 2017, and signing for TSV Langstadt in 2018.

In 2019, Solja came back from 3 games down to win gold in the ITTF-Europe Top 16 against Bernadette Szőcs.
