= Sofia Polcanova =

Moldovan-Austrian table tennis player

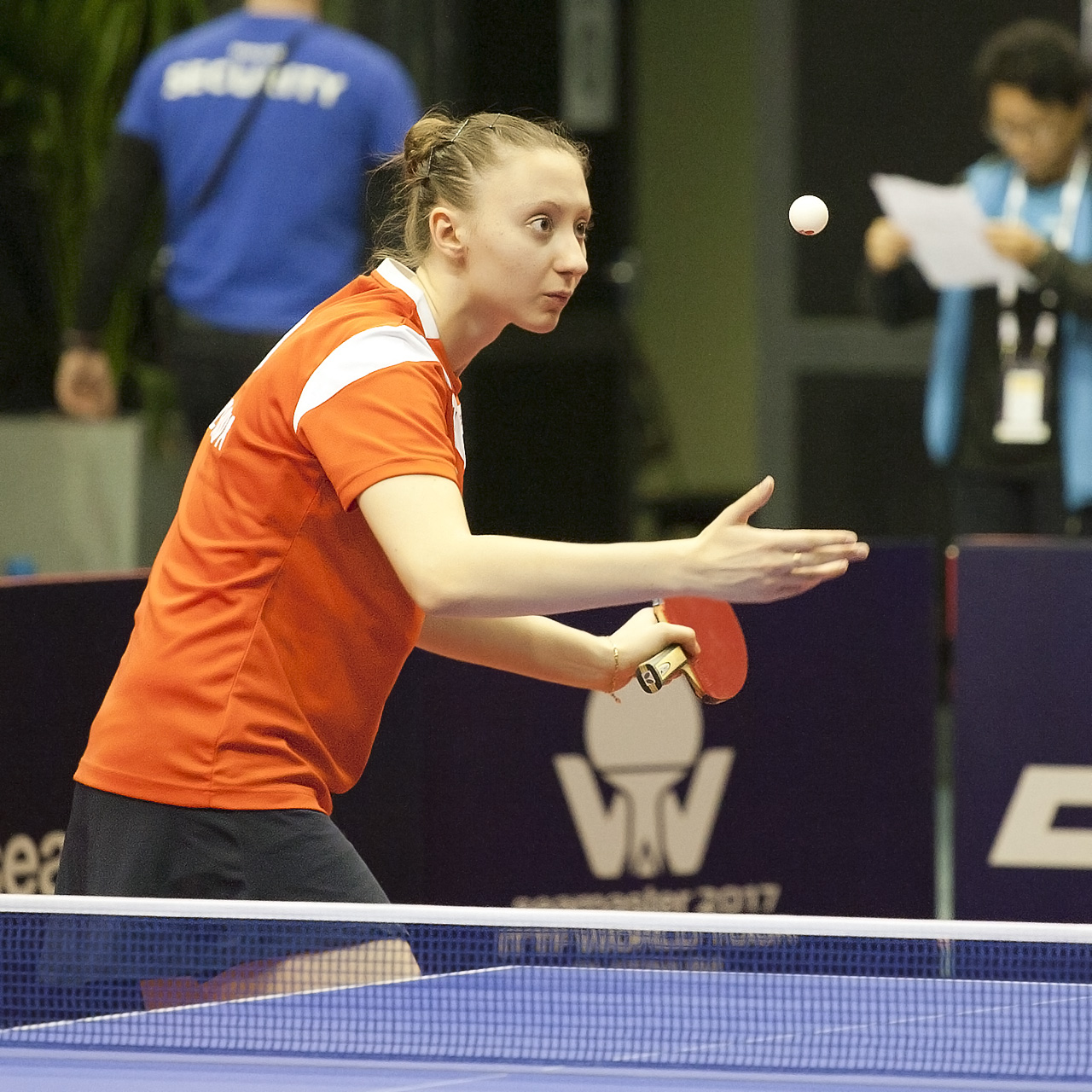
- Polcanova at the 2017 German Open

Personal information
- Nationality: Moldovan; Austrian
- Born: 3 September 1994 (age 32) Chișinău, Moldova
- Height: 180 cm (5 ft 11 in)

Sport
- Sport: Table tennis
- Club: Kinoshita Abyell Kanagawa
- Playing style: Left-handed shakehand grip
- Highest ranking: 10 (23 August 2022)
- Current ranking: 43 (28 September 2026)
Medal record
Women's table tennis
Representing Austria
World Championships
Silver medal – second place	2025 Doha	Doubles
European Championships
Gold medal – first place	2022 Munich	Singles
Gold medal – first place	2022 Munich	Doubles
Gold medal – first place	2024 Linz	Singles
Silver medal – second place	2024 Linz	Doubles
Silver medal – second place	2024 Linz	Mixed doubles
Bronze medal – third place	2022 Munich	Mixed doubles
Europe Top-16
Silver medal – second place	2023 Montreux	Singles
Silver medal – second place	2024 Montreux	Singles
Bronze medal – third place	2019 Montreux	Singles
Bronze medal – third place	2020 Montreux	Singles
Bronze medal – third place	2022 Montreux	Singles

Sofia Polcanova (born 3 September 1994 in Chișinău) is a Moldovan-Austrian table tennis player. She competed at the 2016 Summer Olympics in the women's singles event, in which she was eliminated in the second round by Jian Fang Lay, and as part of the Austrian team in the women's team event. In 2021, she competed in the 2020 Olympics.

In August 2022, she reached a career-high singles ranking of world No. 10 by ITTF/WTT.

== Life ==
Sofia Polcanova, known as "Sonja", grew up in the Moldovan capital, Chișinău. She represented Moldova at the Table Tennis World Championships in 2007, 2008 and 2009. In 2008, at just 14 years of age, she moved to Linz on her own. There, she played for Linz AG Froschberg, where club chairman Günther Renner quickly recognised her potential. Her role model is her club team-mate Liu Jia. Polcanova has held Austrian citizenship since 2010. In 2012, she made her debut for Austria at the European Championships, reaching the last 32 in the singles event, and the following year she helped her team reach the quarter-finals. On the ITTF World Tour, she won the Under-21 events at the Swedish and Croatia Open in 2013, qualifying for the Grand Final in both singles and doubles. In January 2014, she broke into the world's top 100 for the first time. Later that year, she reached her first World Tour semi-final in singles in Magdeburg. At the 2014 European Team Championships in Lisbon, she won the silver medal alongside Liu Jia, Li Qiangbing and Amelie Solja. She achieved a career-high world ranking of 31 in September 2014. In 2015, Polcanova claimed her first World Tour title, winning the doubles event at the Hungarian Open together with Amelie Solja.

Her first World Championship representing Austria was the 2016 World Team Table Tennis Championships, where the team advanced to the main round but was defeated by the Netherlands 3–2. After successfully qualifying for the 2016 Summer Olympics, she was eliminated in the second round by Australia's Jian Fang Lay, narrowly missing out on a place in the round of 32. In the team event, she reached the quarter-finals alongside Liu Jia and Li Qiangbing, where Austria lost to Japan in three matches.

Also in 2016, Polcanova competed in the Europe Top 16 for the first time, finishing in fifth place, which earned her qualification for the 2016 World Cup. There, she advanced to the main draw before losing 4–2 to Mima Itō.

In 2017, she won all three titles at the Austrian Championships: singles, doubles and mixed. She then represented Austria at her first individual World Championships, where she reached the round of 16 in the doubles event, together with Zhang Mo. Polcanova advanced to the quarter-finals at the Europe Top 16, the 2018 World Cup, and the World Team Championships, and concluded the European Championships with three medals: bronze in singles and silver in both doubles and mixed. In May, she also rose to the top of the European rankings, which earned her the No. 1 seed at the 2019 Europe Top 16. There, she claimed her first medal with a bronze finish, and by the end of the year she set a new career high of world No. 14 in the rankings.

At her second Olympic Games in 2021, she reached the round of 16, where she lost to Kasumi Ishikawa. In 2022, she became European champion in women's doubles at the European Table Tennis Championships in Munich, together with the Romanian player Bernadette Szőcs. She then won a second gold medal after defeating Nina Mittelham in the final; Mittelham was forced to retire due to a shoulder injury when the score was 0–2 in sets.

At the 2024 Olympic Games, she became the first Austrian woman to reach the quarter-finals of the singles event but was defeated by Chen Meng. At the European Championships in the same year, she won gold in singles as well as silver in women's doubles with Bernadette Szöcs and in the mixed doubles event with Robert Gardos.

In 2025, Polcanova secured her first World Championship medal at the World Championships in Doha. Together with her partner Bernadette Szőcs, she was only defeated in the final and thus won silver in women's doubles. It was Austria's first World Championship medal since 2003.
