= Truls Möregårdh =

Swedish table tennis player (born 2002)

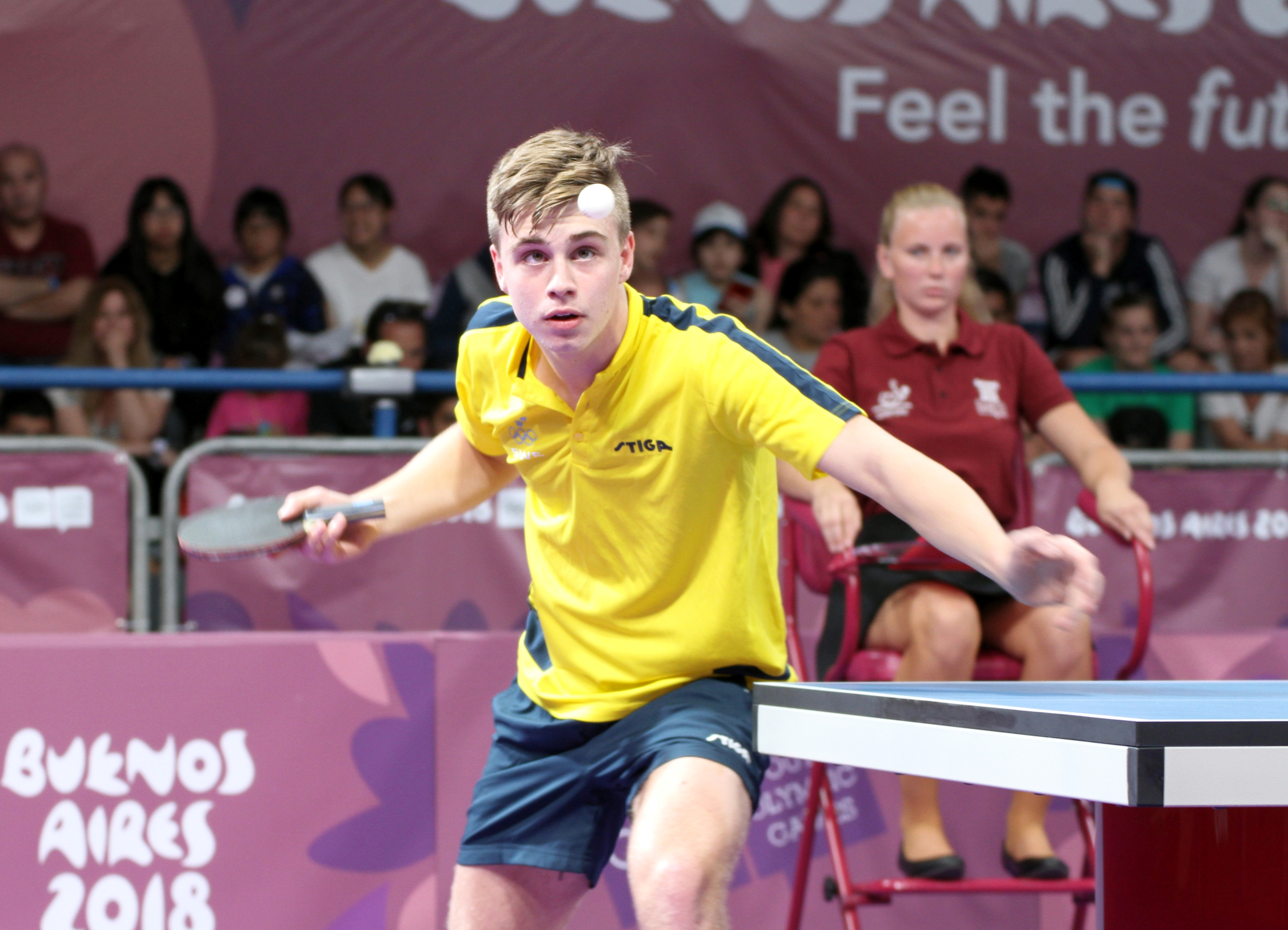
- Möregårdh at the 2018 Youth Olympics

Personal information
- Born: 16 February 2002 (age 24) Lessebo, Sweden

Sport
- Sport: Table tennis
- Playing style: Right-handed, Shakehand grip
- Equipment: Stiga Cybershape Carbon CWT Truls Edition, Stiga DNA Platinum XH (FH and BH)
- Highest ranking: 2 (16 March 2026)
- Current ranking: 5 (2 November 2026)
Medal record
Men's table tennis
Representing Sweden
Olympic Games
Silver medal – second place	2024 Paris	Singles
Silver medal – second place	2024 Paris	Team
World Championships
Silver medal – second place	2021 Houston	Singles
Bronze medal – third place	2018 Halmstad	Team
Bronze medal – third place	2025 Doha	Singles
WTT Cup Finals
Silver medal – second place	2025 Hong Kong	Singles
European Games
Silver medal – second place	2023 Kraków–Małopolska	Team
European Championships
Gold medal – first place	2023 Malmö	Team
Silver medal – second place	2024 Linz	Doubles
Bronze medal – third place	2019 Nantes	Team
Bronze medal – third place	2021 Cluj-Napoca	Team
Bronze medal – third place	2024 Linz	Singles
Europe Top-16
Silver medal – second place	2022 Montreux	Singles
Silver medal – second place	2024 Montreux	Singles
Bronze medal – third place	2025 Montreux	Singles
World Junior Championships
Silver medal – second place	2017 Riva Del Garda	Singles
Silver medal – second place	2019 Korat	Singles

Truls Carl Eric Möregårdh (Swedish pronunciation: [ˈtrɵ̌ls ˈmœ̂ːrɛˌɡoːɖ]; born 16 February 2002) is a Swedish professional table tennis player with Hovmantorp GoIF as his youth team. He took silver in the men's singles event at the 2024 Summer Olympics, as well as at the 2021 World Table Tennis Championships. In 2018, he took bronze with the Swedish team at the World Team Table Tennis Championships. In 2025, Möregårdh became the first non-Chinese player to win a WTT Grand Smash singles title. In March 2026, he achieved a career-high ranking of world No. 2 in singles by ITTF/WTT.

== Playing style and equipment ==
Möregårdh is right-handed and uses the European shakehand style to hold his racket. He has drawn comparisons to the Swedish legend Jan-Ove Waldner for his extensive use of backhand blocking and backhand punching. He also regularly employs a number of unconventional techniques, such as the chop block, which contribute to his creative playing style.

Möregårdh is notable for being one of the first elite players to use a table tennis racket with the Stiga Cybershape blade, which has a hexagonal shape as opposed to the more common oval shape. As a Stiga-sponsored athlete, he uses the Stiga Cybershape Carbon CWT Truls Edition blade and the Stiga Helix Platinum XH rubber on both sides.

== Career ==
Möregårdh was considered a great talent from an early age. He achieved his first international successes in 2016. Overall, he is two-time European student champion and one European youth champion.

He finished second in 2016, 2017 and 2018. He also won the youth TOP 10 in 2016. In 2017 and 2018 he was junior vice world champion and was allowed to take part in the 2018 Summer Youth Olympic Games in Buenos Aires, where he was able to reach the quarter-finals in an individual competition. He reached the game for the bronze medal in the mixed competition, where they were subject to the representation of Taiwan, Su Pei-ling and Lin Yun-ju. While Cacciamani won his singles against Su, Möregårdh and Cacciamani lost in doubles.

With the team he reached 4th place. From 2018 he took part in adult tournaments with increasing frequency, notable successes being winning the bronze medal at the 2018 World Cup and the 2019 European Table Tennis Championships. In 2019 he became Swedish champion after beating Kristian Karlsson in the final. In the same year he moved from Swedish club Eslövs AI BTK to the Japanese club TT Saitama. In 2021 he became Swedish champion again when he defeated Anton Källberg in the final. The same year he won the silver in the 2021 World Championships, losing the final against Fan Zhendong.

As of 2023, he was playing for Lexuan Sports Group TTC in the China Table Tennis Super League.

At the 2024 Summer Olympics, Möregårdh won the silver medal, defeating the top-ranked Wang Chuqin in the round of 32 of the Men's singles but ultimately losing the final to Fan Zhendong. Together with Anton Källberg and Kristian Karlsson, Möregårdh went on to win his second Olympic silver medal in the team event following a defeat against the Chinese team in the final.

== Overview of titles and successes ==
=== Singles ===
- Europe Top-16 - Runner-up (2022)
- Youth World Championship - Runner-ups (2017, 2019)
- European Youth Championship - Champion (2019), runner-up (2018)
- European Championship - Runner-ups (2016, 2017)
- Winner of the youth TOP 10 (2016)
- Swedish Championship - Champion (2019, 2021)
- Summer Olympics - Silver medalist (2024)
- World Championship - Runner-up (2021), semi-finalist (2025)
- WTT Europe Smash - Champion (2025)
- WTT Champions Montpellier - Champion (2025)
- WTT Finals - Runner-up (2025)
- WTT Champions Macao - Champion (2026)

=== Doubles ===
- European Schoolchildren (2017)
- Schoolchildren European Championship - Runner-up (2016)
- Youth European Championship - Runner-up (2019)

=== Mixed doubles ===
- Bronze at the European Youth Championships (2019)
- 4th place at the Youth Olympic Games (2018)

=== Team ===
- 3rd place at the World Championships (2018)
- 3rd place at the European Championships (2019)
- 3rd place at the European Championships (2021)
- Gold at the European Championships (2023)
- Silver at the Paris Olympics (2024)

== Personal life ==
When Möregårdh was 12 years old, his entire family relocated to Eslöv so that he would have better conditions to pursue his table tennis goals. Möregårdh has a brother named Malte Möregårdh, who coaches him.
