= Rachel Moret =

Swiss table tennis player

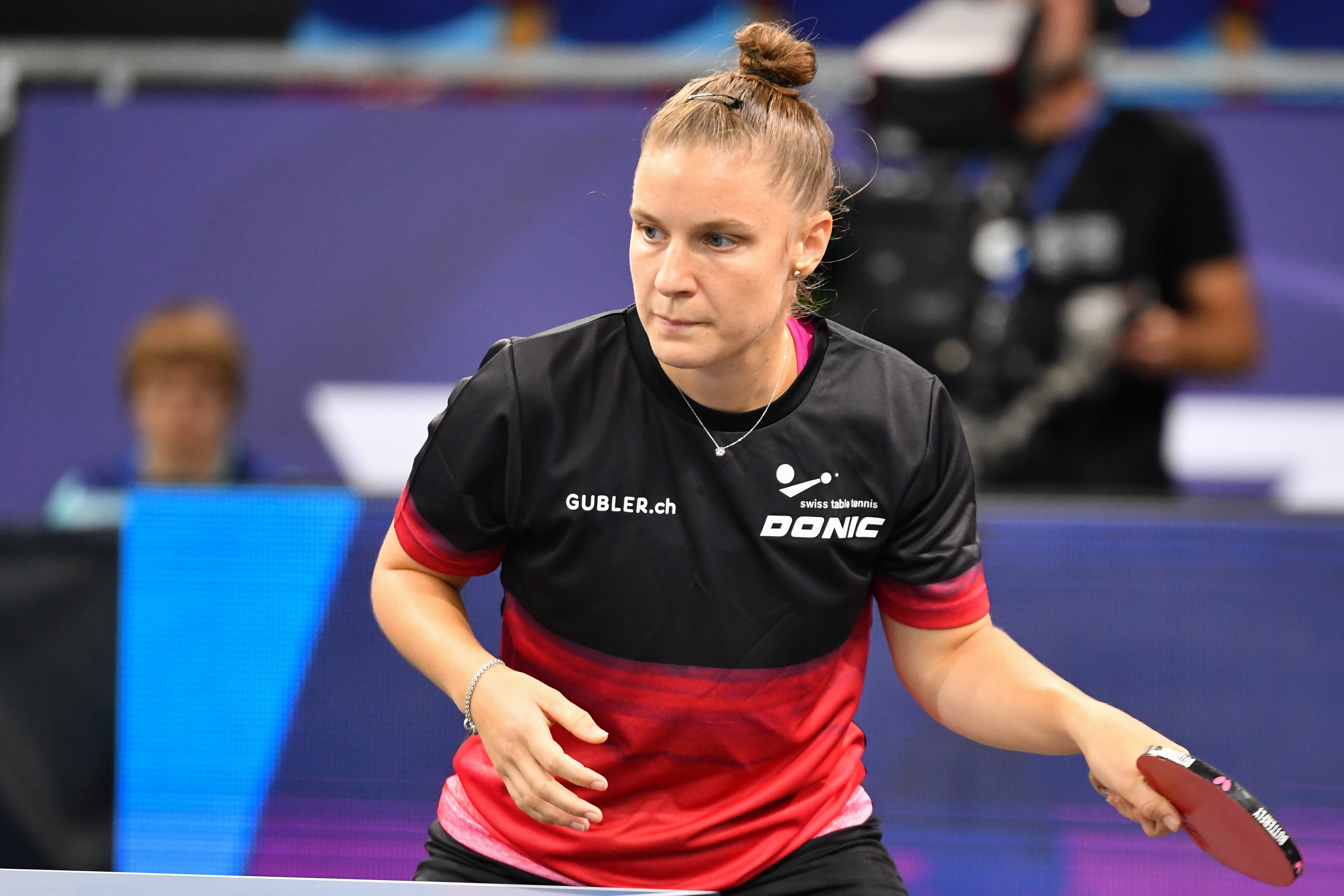
Moret 2022

Rachel Moret (born 23 November 1989) is a Swiss table tennis player. She competed at the 2020 Summer Olympics in Tokyo.
