= Jia Nan Yuan =

French table tennis player

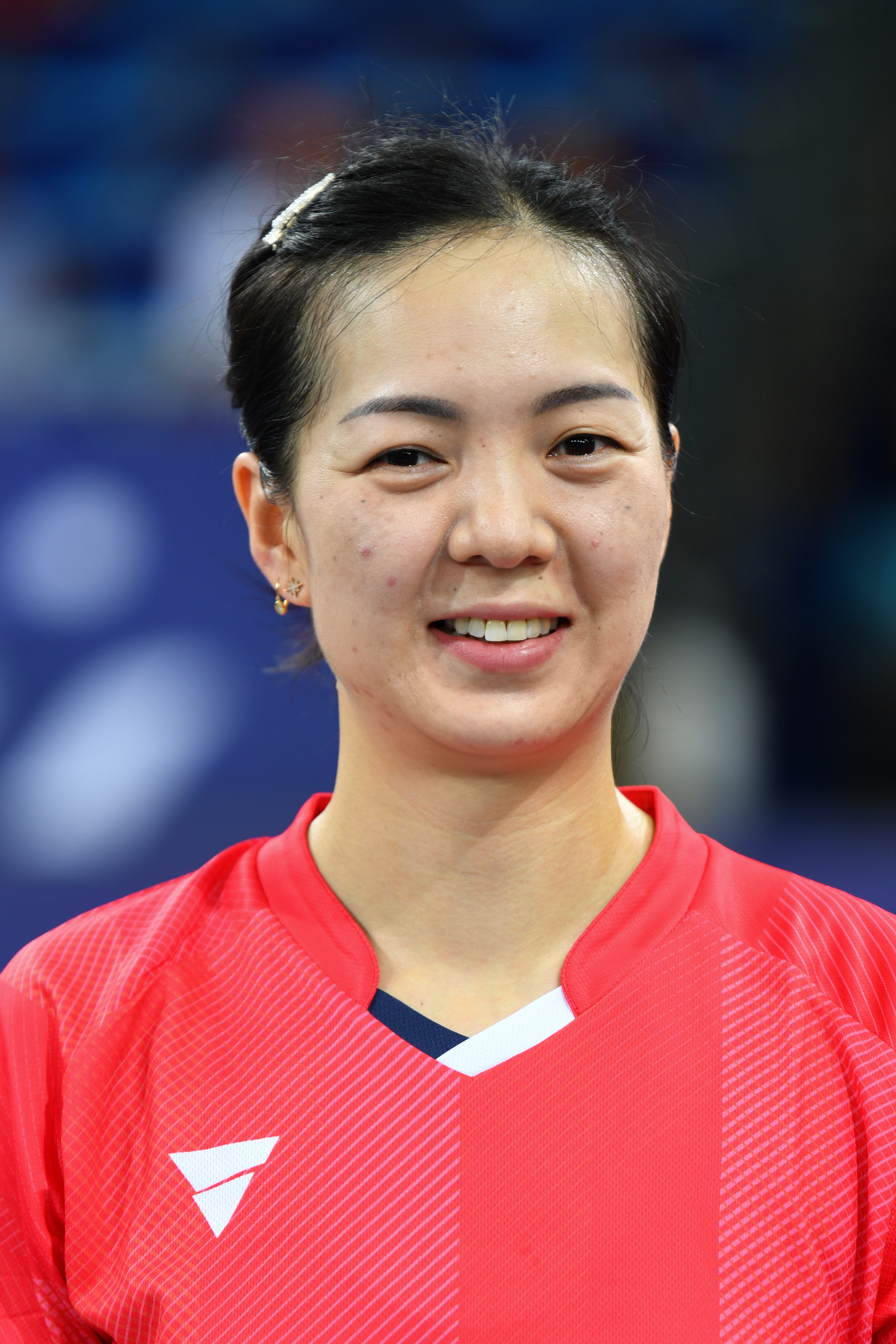
- Yuan at the 2022 European Championships

Personal information
- Nationality: French
- Born: 11 July 1985 (age 41) Zhengzhou, Henan, China
- Height: 1.72 m (5 ft 8 in)

Sport
- Sport: Table tennis
- Playing style: Right-handed shakehand grip
- Highest ranking: 16 (2 January 2023)
- Current ranking: 34 (28 September 2026)
Medal record
Women's table tennis
Representing France
World Championships
Bronze medal – third place	2024 Busan	Team
European Championships
Gold medal – first place	2022 Munich	Mixed doubles
Bronze medal – third place	2023 Malmö	Team
Europe Top-16
Gold medal – first place	2024 Montreux	Singles
Bronze medal – third place	2026 Montreux	Singles

Jia Nan Yuan (or Yuan Jianan, born 11 July 1985) is a Chinese-born table tennis player representing France.

Born in China, she moved to France at the age of 18, in 2003. In 2011, she acquired French citizenship. Since 2018, she represents France in international competitions.

She competed at the 2020 Tokyo Olympic Games, finished fourth at the mixed doubles event.
