= Patrick Franziska =

German table tennis player

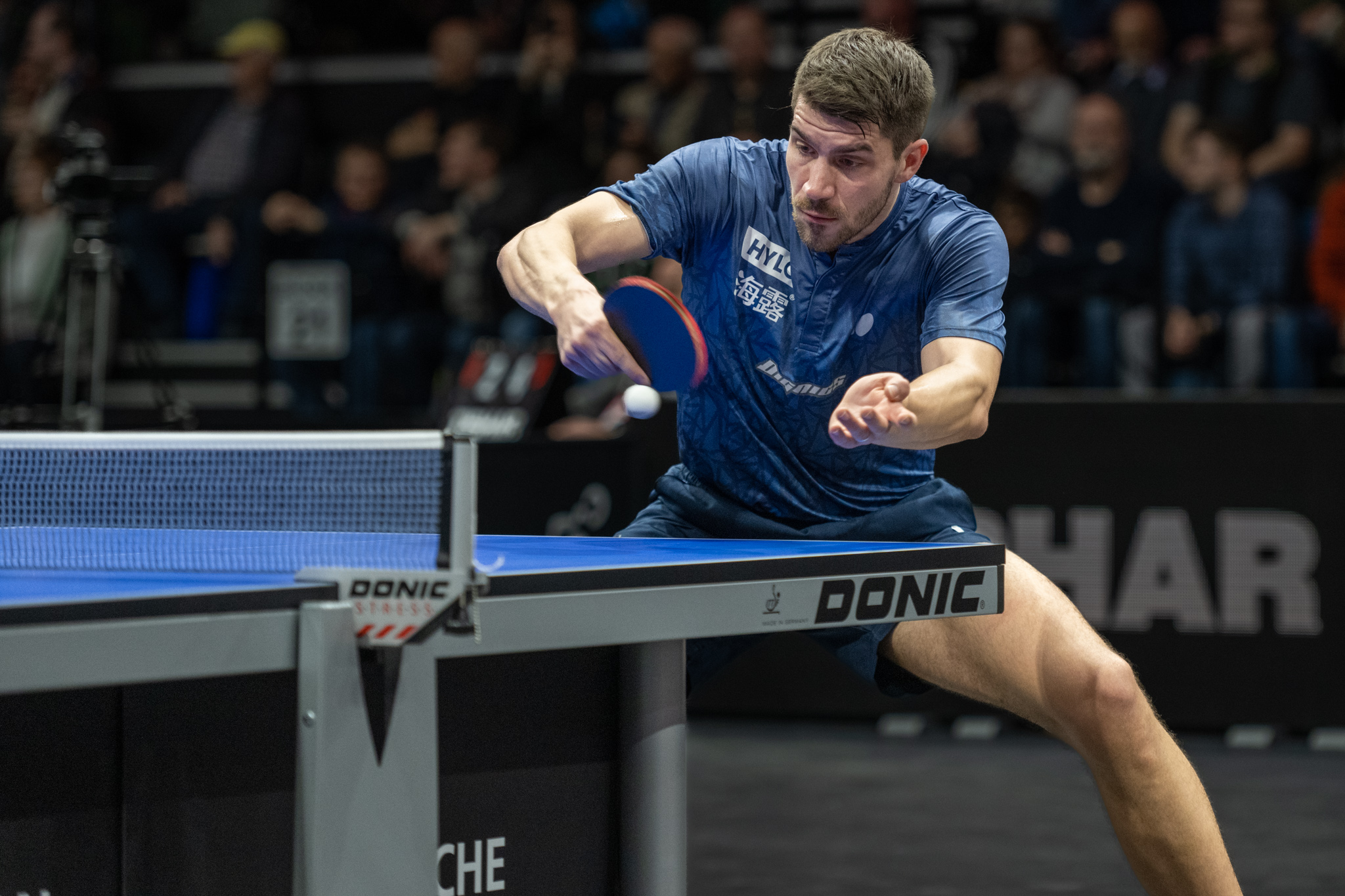
- Franziska in 2023

Personal information
- Born: 11 June 1992 (age 34) Bensheim, Germany
- Height: 190 cm (6 ft 3 in)
- Weight: 88 kg (194 lb)

Sport
- Sport: Table tennis
- Club: FC Saarbrücken-TT (Bundesliga)
- Playing style: Right-handed, shakehand grip
- Equipment: Butterfly Franziska Innerforce ZLC blade; Butterfly Zyre 03 (BLACK, FH); Butterfly Dignics 09C (RED, BH)
- Highest ranking: 8 (7 January 2025)
- Current ranking: 22 (5 October 2026)
Medal record
Men's table tennis
Representing Germany
Event	1st	2nd	3rd
Olympic Games	0	1	0
World Championships	0	2	2
Olympic Games
Silver medal – second place	2020 Tokyo	Team
World Championships
Silver medal – second place	2014 Tokyo	Team
Silver medal – second place	2018 Halmstad	Team
Bronze medal – third place	2019 Budapest	Mixed doubles
Bronze medal – third place	2023 Durban	Doubles
World Cup
Bronze medal – third place	2025 Chengdu	Mixed team
European Games
Gold medal – first place	2019 Minsk	Team
Gold medal – first place	2019 Minsk	Mixed doubles
Gold medal – first place	2023 Kraków–Małopolska	Team
European Championships
Gold medal – first place	2013 Schwechat	Team
Gold medal – first place	2016 Budapest	Doubles
Gold medal – first place	2017 Luxembourg City	Team
Gold medal – first place	2019 Nantes	Team
Gold medal – first place	2021 Cluj-Napoca	Team
Silver medal – second place	2014 Lisbon	Team
Silver medal – second place	2015 Yekaterinburg	Team
Bronze medal – third place	2018 Alicante	Singles
Bronze medal – third place	2018 Alicante	Doubles
Bronze medal – third place	2018 Alicante	Mixed doubles
Bronze medal – third place	2024 Linz	Mixed doubles
Bronze medal – third place	2025 Zadar	Team
Europe Top-16
Gold medal – first place	2021 Thessaloniki	Singles
Bronze medal – third place	2022 Montreux	Singles
Bronze medal – third place	2025 Montreux	Singles

Patrick Franziska (born 11 June 1992) is a German table tennis player. He is currently sponsored by Butterfly and plays with FC Saarbrücken-TT in the German Bundesliga (TTBL).

== Career ==
=== 2010 ===
In 2010, Franziska won the junior boys singles gold medal at the European Youth Championships. He also won the Europe Youth TOP 10 in Slovakia. In December, he won bronze medals in men's doubles and men's team at the 2010 World Junior Table Tennis Championships. In this year, he joined the German National Team to win the men's team gold medal at the 2010 European Table Tennis Championships.

=== 2021 ===
Patrick Franziska represented Germany at the postponed Tokyo 2020 Summer Olympics, where he won the silver medal with the men's team. In March, he entered the WTT Star Contender event at WTT Doha, but lost 11–9 in the fifth to Sharath Kamal.

=== 2022 ===
Franziska won bronze at the Europe Top 16 Cup. He finished second at the WTT Contender Tunis 2022, losing against Anton Kallberg in the men's single's finals. Winner in Men's Singles at the WTT Feeder Series Düsseldorf II

=== 2023 ===
He won a bronze medal together with Dimitrij Ovtcharov in men's doubles at the ITTF World Table Tennis Championship in Durban. At the European Games 2023, he won the men's team gold medal, together with Timo Boll, Dang Qiu and Dimitrij Ovtcharov, repeating their success of 2019 and again winning against Sweden in the finals.

=== 2024 ===
Franziska reached second place in the first-ever Saudi Smash tournament, losing only to Wang Chuqin, ranked no. 1 in the world. In the process he beat Fan Zhendong, then ranked 2.

== Singles titles ==
Year	Tournament	Final opponent	Score	Ref
2021	Europe Top-16	(Portugal) Marcos Freitas	4–1	
2022	WTT Feeder Düsseldorf II	(Romania) Ovidiu Ionescu	4–0	
