= 2024 World Team Table Tennis Championships – Men's team =

Men's team at the 2024 World Team Table Tennis Championships
- Venue: Busan Exhibition and Convention Center
- Location: Busan, South Korea
- Dates: 16–25 February
- Teams: 40

Medalists
gold medal	Fan Zhendong; Wang Chuqin; Ma Long; Liang Jingkun; Lin Gaoyuan	China
silver medal	Félix Lebrun; Alexis Lebrun; Simon Gauzy; Jules Rolland; Lilian Bardet	France
bronze medal	Jang Woo-jin; Lim Jong-hoon; Lee Sang-su; An Jae-hyun; Park Gyu-hyeon	South Korea
bronze medal	Lin Yun-ju; Kao Cheng-jui; Chuang Chih-yuan; Feng Yi-hsin; Huang Yan-cheng	Chinese Taipei

The men's team tournament of the 2024 World Team Table Tennis Championships was held from 16 to 25 February 2024.

China won the title for the 23rd time with a win over France.

== Format ==
The 40 teams were drawn into eight groups of five teams. After a round robin in each group, the top team advanced to the round of 16, while the second and third-placed teams played in the round of 24, in the knockout stage. A team match consisted of five singles matches, where each singles match was decided in best-of-5 games.

== Qualification ==
Number of teams eligible to compete for the trophy in each team event is 40. Continental Stage – 33 Teams will qualify from the Continental Stage. The Continental quota allocation is the following: 4 for Africa, 10 for Asia, 11 for Europe, 6 for PanAm, and 2 for Oceania. Numbers are according to the "2020 BoD Proposition 28". Host nation – is guaranteed. If the host nation is already qualified through the Continental Stage, the host quota will be reallocated to the ITTF WTR Oct 2023 Intercontinental Stage – As per the decision of the ITTF Council, in Bangkok on August 23, 2023, no Intercontinental Stage will be held in 2023. Instead, the remaining six (6) places shall be allocated as follows; Five (5) places are transferred to the five continents as follows: Africa 1, Asia 1, Europe 1, PanAm 1 and Oceania 1) with the final allocation as per qualifying event or Team World Ranking (TWR) to be confirmed by each Continental Federation. The remaining one (1) place will go to the highest ranked not-yet qualified team on the ITTF WTR November 2023.

Qualification	Teams
Host	South Korea
Africa (5); 2023 African Championships (4) and world team ranking (1)	Egypt; Nigeria; Algeria; Madagascar
Americas (7); 2023 Pan American Championships (4) and world team ranking (3)	Brazil; Canada; Chile; Puerto Rico; United States; Cuba
Asia (11); 2023 Asian Championships (10) and world team ranking (1)	China; Chinese Taipei; India; Japan; Iran; Singapore; Kazakhstan; Hong Kong; Thailand; Malaysia; Saudi Arabia
Europe (12); 2023 European Championships (8) and world team ranking (4)	Sweden; Germany; France; Portugal; Hungary; Croatia; Belgium; Denmark; Slovenia; England; Poland; Romania; Austria; Czech Republic; Serbia
Oceania (3); 2023 Oceanian Championships (2) and world team ranking (1)	Australia; New Zealand
Intercontinental quota (1) world team ranking	Slovakia

== Draw ==
The draw took place on 16 January 2024.

== Schedule ==
The schedule was as follows.

Fri 16	Sat 17	Sun 18	Mon 19	Tue 20	Wed 21		Thu 22	Fri 23	Sat 24	Sun 25
Group					1/16 F	1/8 F	QF		SF	F

== Group stage ==
All times are local (UTC+9).

=== Group 1 ===
Pos	Team	Pld	W	L	MF	MA	MR	Pts	Qualification
1	China	4	4	0	12	0	—	8	Round of 16
2	Croatia	4	3	1	9	7	1.286	7	Playoffs
3	Hungary	4	2	2	7	8	0.875	6	Playoffs
4	Belgium	4	1	3	7	9	0.778	5	
5	Cuba	4	0	4	1	12	0.083	4	

Source: World Table Tennis
Rules for classification: 1) points; 2) head-to-head points; 3) head-to-head match ratio.

16 February 2024; 10:00	Hungary	3–0	Cuba

	Individual matches
Ádám Szudi	3–1	Jorge Campos	11–9, 13–11, 1–11, 11–5
Csaba András	3–1	Andy Pereira	11–4, 11–6, 9–11, 11–9
Tamás Lakatos	3–1	Adrián Pérez	11–6, 12–10, 16–18, 11–6

16 February 2024; 20:00	China	3–0	Belgium

	Individual matches
Fan Zhendong	3–0	Cedric Nuytinck	11–5, 11–6, 11–6
Wang Chuqin	3–0	Adrien Rassenfosse	11–8, 13–11, 11–4
Ma Long	3–1	Martin Allegro	11–4, 11–7, 10–12, 11–7

17 February 2024; 13:00	Cuba	0–3	China

	Individual matches
Andy Pereira	0–3	Wang Chuqin	4–11, 4–11, 5–11
Jorge Campos	0–3	Liang Jingkun	10–12, 10–12, 3–11
Adrián Pérez	0–3	Ma Long	5–11, 2–11, 5–11

17 February 2024; 17:00	Croatia	3–1	Hungary

	Individual matches
Tomislav Pucar	3–1	Ádám Szudi	4–11, 11–8, 11–8, 11–7
Andrej Gaćina	3–1	Csaba András	11–9, 4–11, 11–6, 11–9
Filip Zeljko	1–3	Tamás Lakatos	9–11, 11–4, 6–11, 8–11
Tomislav Pucar	3–1	Csaba András	11–9, 11–7, 6–11, 11–6

18 February 2024; 10:00	China	3–0	Hungary

	Individual matches
Fan Zhendong	3–0	Bence Majoros	11–7, 11–4, 11–5
Liang Jingkun	3–0	Tamás Lakatos	11–6, 11–8, 11–5
Lin Gaoyuan	3–1	Ádám Szudi	10–12, 11–6, 11–2, 11–7

18 February 2024; 17:00	Croatia	3–2	Belgium

	Individual matches
Tomislav Pucar	2–3	Cedric Nuytinck	9–11, 11–7, 8–11, 12–10, 5–11
Andrej Gaćina	1–3	Adrien Rassenfosse	11–6, 12–14, 11–13, 9–11
Filip Zeljko	3–1	Martin Allegro	7–11, 11–5, 11–7, 11–8
Tomislav Pucar	3–0	Adrien Rassenfosse	12–10, 11–7, 16–14
Andrej Gaćina	3–0	Cedric Nuytinck	11–8, 12–10, 11–6

19 February 2024; 10:00	China	3–0	Croatia

	Individual matches
Fan Zhendong	3–0	Tomislav Pucar	11–6, 12–10, 11–9
Wang Chuqin	3–0	Filip Zeljko	11–6, 11–5, 11–6
Ma Long	3–0	Frane Kojić	11–8, 11–4, 11–9

19 February 2024; 13:00	Belgium	3–0	Cuba

	Individual matches
Adrien Rassenfosse	3–0	Andy Pereira	11–8, 11–9, 11–6
Cedric Nuytinck	3–2	Jorge Campos	6–11, 7–11, 11–8, 11–5, 11–8
Martin Allegro	3–0	Livan Martinez	11–6, 11–8, 15–13

20 February 2024; 20:00	Croatia	3–1	Cuba

	Individual matches
Frane Kojić	3–0	Jorge Campos	11–4, 11–6, 11–4
Filip Zeljko	1–3	Andy Pereira	11–5, 9–11, 11–13, 9–11
Tomislav Pucar	3–1	Adrián Pérez	12–10, 11–7, 9–11, 11–9
Frane Kijic	3–2	Andy Pereira	9–11, 11–7, 7–11, 11–5, 11–8

20 February 2024; 20:00	Hungary	3–2	Belgium

	Individual matches
Ádám Szudi	3–1	Cedric Nuytinck	6–11, 11–5, 11–8, 11–7
Tamás Lakatos	3–2	Adrien Rassenfosse	11–4, 4–11, 5–11, 11–5, 11–5
Bence Majoros	0–3	Martin Allegro	10–12, 6–11, 6–11
Ádám Szudi	2–3	Adrien Rassenfosse	11–3, 8–11, 11–5, 9–11, 6–11
Tamás Lakatos	3–1	Cedric Nuytinck	6–11, 11–9, 11–4, 11–7

=== Group 2 ===
Pos	Team	Pld	W	L	MF	MA	MR	Pts	Qualification
1	Germany	4	4	0	12	2	6.000	8	Round of 16
2	Kazakhstan	4	2	2	10	7	1.429	6 (Note: Kazakhstan 3 Pts, 5–4 in matches; England 3 Pts, 5–5 in matches; United States 3 Pts, 4–5 in matches)	Playoffs
3	England	4	2	2	8	8	1.000	6	Playoffs
4	United States	4	2	2	7	8	0.875	6	
5	Saudi Arabia	4	0	4	0	12	0.000	4	

Source: World Table Tennis
Rules for classification: 1) points; 2) head-to-head points; 3) head-to-head match ratio.
Notes:

16 February 2024; 13:00	Kazakhstan	3–0	Saudi Arabia

	Individual matches
Kirill Gerassimenko	3–0	Khalid Al-Shareif	11–1, 11–1, 11–5
Aidos Kenzhigulov	3–2	Ali Al-Khadrawi	13–11, 8–11, 6–11, 12–10, 11–9
Alan Kurmangaliyev	3–0	Abdulaziz Shulaybi	11–3, 11–7, 11–9

16 February 2024; 17:00	United States	0–3	Germany

	Individual matches
Liang Jishan	0–3	Patrick Franziska	9–11, 7–11, 4–11
Nikhil Kumar	0–3	Dang Qiu	3–11, 7–11, 7–11
Nandan Naresh	0–3	Dimitrij Ovtcharov	12–14, 8–11, 4–11

17 February 2024; 10:00	Kazakhstan	2–3	England

	Individual matches
Kirill Gerassimenko	3–2	Paul Drinkhall	7–11, 11–9, 11–5, 6–11, 11–4
Aidos Kenzhigulov	1–3	Liam Pitchford	6–11, 6–11, 13–11, 8–11
Alan Kurmangaliyev	0–3	Tom Jarvis	9–11, 9–11, 5–11
Kirill Gerassimenko	3–2	Liam Pitchford	7–11, 11–6, 14–12, 9–11, 11–4
Aidos Kenzhigulov	1–3	Paul Drinkhall	11–7, 5–11, 10–12, 2–11

17 February 2024; 20:00	Saudi Arabia	0–3	Germany

	Individual matches
Ali Al-Khadrawi	0–3	Benedikt Duda	5–11, 5–11, 7–11
Abdulaziz Bu Shulaybi	0–3	Dimitrij Ovtcharov	13–15, 5–11, 4–11
Turki Al-Mutairi	0–3	Dang Qiu	3–11, 4–11, 6–11

18 February 2024; 13:00	Germany	3–2	Kazakhstan

	Individual matches
Dang Qiu	3–0	Alan Kurmangaliyev	11–3, 11–8, 11–3
Dimitrij Ovtcharov	1–3	Kirill Gerassimenko	6–11, 11–4, 9–11, 6–11
Patrick Franziska	3–0	Aidos Kenzhigulov	11–3, 11–5, 11–9
Dang Qiu	2–3	Kirill Gerassimenko	11–7, 11–7, 8–11, 8–11, 9–11
Dimitrij Ovtcharov	3–0	Alan Kurmangaliyev	11–4, 11–4, 11–4

18 February 2024; 13:00	England	2–3	United States

	Individual matches
Liam Pitchford	1–3	Nikhil Kumar	11–13, 5–11, 11–5, 7–11
Paul Drinkhall	1–3	Liang Jishan	10–12, 7–11, 11–3, 9–11
Tom Jarvis	3–1	Sid Naresh	11–6, 13–11, 9–11, 12–10
Liam Pitchford	3–0	Liang Jishan	12–10, 14–12, 11–7
Paul Drinkhall	2–3	Nikhil Kumar	11–7, 9–11, 6–11, 11–7, 9–11

19 February 2024; 10:00	United States	3–0	Saudi Arabia

	Individual matches
Nikhil Kumar	3–0	Abdulaziz Shulaybi	11–5, 11–9, 12–10
Liang Jishan	3–0	Ali Al-Khadrawi	12–10, 11–7, 11–3
Nandan Naresh	3–2	Azzam Alim	11–6, 9–11, 13–11, 5–11, 11–9

19 February 2024; 17:00	Germany	3–0	England

	Individual matches
Qiu Dang	3–0	Sam Walker	11–8, 11–5, 11–5
Dimitrij Ovtcharov	3–0	Tom Jarvis	12–10, 11–7, 11–9
Patrick Franziska	3–1	Paul Drinkhall	11–4, 9–11, 11–5, 11–4

20 February 2024; 20:00	England	3–0	Saudi Arabia

	Individual matches
Tom Jarvis	3–0	Khalid Al-Shareif	11–5, 11–5, 11–8
Paul Drinkhall	3–0	Abdulaziz Shulaybi	11–5, 11–5, 11–5
Sam Walker	3–1	Ali Al-Khadrawi	9–11, 11–8, 11–6, 11–5

20 February 2024; 20:00	Kazakhstan	3–1	United States

	Individual matches
Kirill Gerassimenko	3–0	Sid Naresh	11–8, 11–3, 11–9
Alan Kurmangaliyev	0–3	Nikhil Kumar	12–14, 8–11, 13–15
Aidos Kenzhigulov	3–0	Liang Jishan	Liang Jishan DSQ
Kirill Gerassimenko	3–2	Nikhil Kumar	8–11, 11–4, 8–11, 11–5, 11–2

=== Group 3 ===
Pos	Team	Pld	W	L	MF	MA	MR	Pts	Qualification
1	South Korea (H)	4	4	0	12	1	12.000	8	Round of 16
2	Poland	4	3	1	10	4	2.500	7	Playoffs
3	India	4	2	2	7	6	1.167	6	Playoffs
4	Chile	4	1	3	3	9	0.333	5	
5	New Zealand	4	0	4	0	12	0.000	4	

Source: World Table Tennis
Rules for classification: 1) points; 2) head-to-head points; 3) head-to-head match ratio.
(H) Hosts

16 February 2024; 10:00	South Korea	3–1	Poland

	Individual matches
Jang Woo-jin	3–2	Maciej Kubik	13–15, 8–11, 11–8, 11–7, 11–6
Lim Jong-hoon	3–1	Miłosz Redzimski	12–10, 11–9, 10–12, 11–4
An Jae-hyun	1–3	Jakub Dyjas	8–11, 10–12, 11–7, 9–11
Jang Woo-jin	3–0	Miłosz Redzimski	11–8, 11–3, 14–12

16 February 2024; 13:00	Chile	3–0	New Zealand

	Individual matches
Nicolas Burgos	3–1	Maxwell Henderson	11–6, 11–0, 4–11, 11–8
Gustavo Gómez	3–1	Alfred Dela Pena	11–9, 9–11, 11–5, 11–5
Felipe Olivares	3–2	Timothy Choi	7–11, 8–11, 11–5, 11–6, 13–11

17 February 2024; 20:00	South Korea	3–0	New Zealand

	Individual matches
An Jae-hyun	3–0	Alfred Dela Pena	11–6, 11–5, 11–1
Lee Sang-su	3–0	Timothy Choi	11–4, 11–9, 11–4
Park Gyu-hyeon	3–0	Maxwell Henderson	11–5, 11–2, 11–8

17 February 2024; 20:00	Chile	0–3	India

	Individual matches
Nicolas Burgos	0–3	Sharath Kamal	5–11, 8–11, 6–11
Gustavo Gómez	0–3	Harmeet Desai	8–11, 7–11, 6–11
Felipe Olivares	0–3	Sathiyan Gnanasekaran	10–12, 8–11, 8–11

18 February 2024; 13:00	Poland	3–1	India

	Individual matches
Jakub Dyjas	3–1	Sharath Kamal	11–8, 8–11, 11–4, 12–10
Maciej Kubik	1–3	Harmeet Desai	10–12, 11–13, 11–9, 5–11
Miłosz Redzimski	3–2	Manav Thakkar	11–9, 9–11, 12–14, 11–6, 11–7
Jakub Dyjas	3–1	Harmeet Desai	11–7, 11–7, 8–11, 14–12

18 February 2024; 17:00	South Korea	3–0	Chile

	Individual matches
Lim Jong-hoon	3–1	Gustavo Gómez	11–6, 7–11, 11–6, 11–7
Jang Woo-jin	3–0	Nicolas Burgos	11–8, 11–4, 11–6
Lee Sang-su	3–0	Felipe Olivares	11–8, 11–7, 12–10

19 February 2024; 10:00	South Korea	3–0	India

	Individual matches
Jang Woo-jin	3–0	Harmeet Desai	11–4, 12–10, 11–8
Lim Jong-hoon	3–0	Sathiyan Gnanasekaran	11–5, 11–7, 11–7
Lee Sang-su	3–1	Sharath Kamal	11–9, 8–11, 11–6, 11–5

19 February 2024; 17:00	Poland	3–0	New Zealand

	Individual matches
Jakub Dyjas	3–0	Maxwell Henderson	11–5, 11–4, 11–3
Samuel Kulczycki	3–1	Timothy Choi	11–5, 9–11, 11–2, 11–2
Maciej Kubik	3–0	Alfred Dela Pena	11–6, 11–7, 11–8

20 February 2024; 20:00	Chile	0–3	Poland

	Individual matches
Nicolas Burgos	1–3	Samuel Kulczycki	8–11, 11–9, 8–11, 7–11
Gustavo Gómez	0–3	Jakub Dyjas	3–11, 10–12, 6–11
Felipe Olivares	0–3	Milosz Redzimski	6–11, 8–11, 8–11

20 February 2024; 20:00	India	3–0	New Zealand

	Individual matches
Harmeet Desai	3–0	Timothy Choi	11–5, 11–1, 11–6
Sathiyan Gnanasekaran	3–0	Alfred Dela Pena	11–3, 11–7, 11–6
Manush Utpalbhai Shah	3–2	Maxwell Henderson	10–12, 6–11, 11–4, 11–8, 11–6

=== Group 4 ===
Pos	Team	Pld	W	L	MF	MA	MR	Pts	Qualification
1	France	4	4	0	12	1	12.000	8	Round of 16
2	Denmark	4	3	1	10	6	1.667	7	Playoffs
3	Austria	4	2	2	7	6	1.167	6	Playoffs
4	Australia	4	1	3	4	11	0.364	5	
5	Algeria	4	0	4	3	12	0.250	4	

Source: World Table Tennis
Rules for classification: 1) points; 2) head-to-head points; 3) head-to-head match ratio.

16 February 2024; 13:00	France	3–1	Denmark

	Individual matches
Félix Lebrun	3–2	Jonathan Groth	11–7, 11–5, 16–18, 8–11, 11–6
Simon Gauzy	2–3	Anders Lind	11–9, 7–11, 11–8, 8–11, 9–11
Alexis Lebrun	3–0	Tobias Rasmussen	11–6, 11–5, 11–2
Félix Lebrun	3–0	Anders Lind	12–10, 11–6, 11–6

16 February 2024; 17:00	Algeria	0–3	Austria

	Individual matches
Mehdi Bouloussa	0–3	Robert Gardos	4–11, 6–11, 8–11
Abdelbasset Chaichi	0–3	Daniel Habesohn	7–11, 3–11, 5–11
Milhane Jellouli	0–3	Andreas Levenko	6–11, 1–11, 5–11

17 February 2024; 10:00	France	3–0	Algeria

	Individual matches
Simon Gauzy	3–0	Milhane Jellouli	11–5, 11–5, 13–11
Alexis Lebrun	3–0	Mehdi Bouloussa	11–2, 11–7, 11–7
Jules Rolland	3–0	Abdelbasset Chaichi	11–3, 11–3, 11–4

17 February 2024; 20:00	Australia	0–3	Austria

	Individual matches
Nicholas Lum	0–3	Robert Gardos	12–14, 8–11, 9–11
Finn Luu	0–3	Daniel Habesohn	9–11, 6–11, 4–11
Aditya Sareen	0–3	Andreas Levenko	7–11, 4–11, 9–11

18 February 2024; 13:00	Australia	1–3	Denmark

	Individual matches
Nicholas Lum	0–3	Anders Lind	4–11, 8–11, 8–11
Aditya Sareen	0–3	Jonathan Groth	10–12, 4–11, 8–11
Finn Luu	3–2	Tobias Rasmussen	11–9, 9–11, 11–7, 7–11, 11–7
Nicholas Lum	0–3	Jonathan Groth	10–12, 8–11, 9–11

18 February 2024; 20:00	Austria	0–3	France

	Individual matches
Daniel Habesohn	0–3	Félix Lebrun	4–11, 9–11, 11–13
Robert Gardos	0–3	Alexis Lebrun	9–11, 6–11, 5–11
Andreas Levenko	2–3	Simon Gauzy	7–11, 12–10, 11–7, 9–11, 7–11

19 February 2024; 13:00	France	3–0	Australia

	Individual matches
Jules Rolland	3–0	Finn Luu	11–7, 11–8, 11–4
Simon Gauzy	3–0	Aditya Sareen	11–5, 11–9, 11–7
Lilian Bardet	3–2	Nicholas Lium	9–11, 11–6, 11–3, 8–11, 11–9

19 February 2024; 17:00	Denmark	3–1	Algeria

	Individual matches
Anders Lind	3–0	Mehdi Bouloussa	11–4, 11–7, 11–8
Jonathan Groth	3–0	Abdelbasset Chaichi	11–8, 11–7, 11–8
Tobias Rasmussen	1–3	Milhane Jellouli	9–11, 8–11, 11–7, 7–11,
Jonathan Groth	3–0	Mehdi Bouloussa	11–7, 13–11, 11–3

20 February 2024; 20:00	Australia	3–2	Algeria

	Individual matches
Nicholas Lum	3–0	Milhane Jellouli	11'–4, 11–7, 11–9
Finn Luu	1–3	Mehdi Bouloussa	9–'11, 6–11, 11–9, 1–11
Aditya Sareen	3–1	Abdelbasset Chaichi	8–11, 12–10, 11–7, 11–4
Nicholas Lum	1–3	Mehdi Bouloussa	11–9, 10–12, 7–11, 6–11
Finn Luu	3–2	Milhane Jellouli	11–7, 11–6, 7–11, 6–11, 11–7

20 February 2024; 20:00	Austria	1–3	Denmark

	Individual matches
Robert Gardos	1–3	Jonathan Groth	9–11, 11–7, 6–11, 14–16
Daniel Habesohn	2–3	Anders Lind	11–9, 11–1, 14–16, 5–11, 8–11
Andreas Levenko	3–0	Thor Christensen	11–6, 11–5, 11–8
Robert Gardos	2–3	Jonathan Groth	8–11, 11–8, 5–11, 11–8, 11–13

=== Group 5 ===
Pos	Team	Pld	W	L	MF	MA	MR	Pts	Qualification
1	Japan	4	4	0	12	1	12.000	8	Round of 16
2	Chinese Taipei	4	3	1	10	5	2.000	7	Playoffs
3	Czech Republic	4	2	2	8	7	1.143	6	Playoffs
4	Madagascar	4	1	3	4	10	0.400	5	
5	Nigeria	4	0	4	1	12	0.083	3	

Source: World Table Tennis
Rules for classification: 1) points; 2) head-to-head points; 3) head-to-head match ratio.

16 February 2024; 13:00	Czech Republic	3–1	Madagascar

	Individual matches
Lubomír Jančařík	3–2	Jonathan Nativel	11–7, 7–11, 11–5, 9–11, 11–4
Tomaš Polansky	2–3	Fabio Rakotoarimanana	11–3, 9–11, 11–7, 9–11, 8–11
Jiří Martinko	3–1	Antoine Razafinarivo	11–7, 11–8, 9–11, 11–8
Lubomír Jančařík	3–1	Fabio Rakotoarimanana	11–5, 11–9, 9–11, 11–5

16 February 2024; 17:00	Japan	3–0 (W.O.)	Nigeria

17 February 2024; 10:00	Nigeria	0–3	Chinese Taipei

	Individual matches
Olajide Omotayo	0–3	Kao Cheng-jui	0–11, 8–11, 3–11
Bode Abiodun	0–3	Lin Yun-ju	5–11, 3–11, 3–11
Quadri Aruna	0–3	Chuang Chih-yuan	walkover

17 February 2024; 17:00	Japan	3–0	Czech Republic

	Individual matches
Tomokazu Harimoto	3–1	Tomaš Polansky	11–5, 11–1, 10–12, 11–8
Hiroto Shinozuka	3–0	Lubomír Jančařík	11–5, 11–5, 11–4
Sora Matsushima	3–0	Šimon Bělík	11–2, 11–6, 11–7

18 February 2024; 10:00	Nigeria	1–3	Madagascar

	Individual matches
Olajide Omotayo	3–0	Antoine Razafinarivo	11–8, 11–7, 11–8
Bode Abiodun	1–3	Fabio Rakotoarimanana	5–11, 7–11, 11–8, 7–11
Quadri Aruna	0–3	Jonathan Nativel	walkover
Olajide Omotayo	0–3	Fabio Rakotoarimanana	9–11, 7–11, 7–11

18 February 2024; 17:00	Japan	3–1	Chinese Taipei

	Individual matches
Tomokazu Harimoto	3–0	Kao Cheng-jui	11–5, 17–15, 13–11
Hiroto Shinozuka	2–3	Lin Yun-ju	11–6, 6–11, 5–11, 12–10, 6–11
Sora Matsushima	3–2	Chuang Chih-yuan	11–9, 11–13, 11–6, 8–11, 11–9
Tomokazu Harimoto	3–2	Lin Yun-ju	12–10, 9–11, 11–3, 7–11, 11–3

19 February 2024; 17:00	Japan	3–0	Madagascar

	Individual matches
Tomokazu Harimoto	3–0	Fabio Rakotoarimanana	11–5, 11–4, 11–3
Hiroto Shinozuka	3–0	Antoine Razafinarivo	15–13, 11–9, 11–3
Yuta Tanaka	3–0	Jonathan Nativel	11–1, 11–7, 11–5

19 February 2024; 17:00	Czech Republic	2–3	Chinese Taipei

	Individual matches
Lubomír Jančařík	3–0	Kao Cheng-jui	11–5, 11–7, 24–22
Tomaš Polansky	0–3	Lin Yun-ju	2–11, 7–11, 4–11
Jiří Martinko	3–1	Chuang Chih-yuan	11–1, 12–10, 4–11, 11–7
Lubomír Jančařík	0–3	Lin Yun-ju	9–11, 5–11, 5–11
Tomaš Polansky	0–3	Kao Cheng-jui	walkover

20 February 2024; 10:00	Chinese Taipei	3–0	Madagascar

	Individual matches
Kao Cheng-jui	3–0	Antoine Razafinarivo	11–7, 11–3, 11–5
Huang Yan-cheng	3–0	Fabio Rakotoarimanana	11–4, 11–7, 11–8
Feng Yi-hsin	3–0	Jonathan Nativel	11–3, 11–4, 11–8

20 February 2024; 10:00	Czech Republic	3–0	Nigeria

	Individual matches
Lubomír Jančařík	3–0	Bode Abiodun	11–6, 11–9, 12–10
Jiří Martinko	3–2	Olajide Omotayo	5–11, 8–11, 11–4, 11–5, 11–7
Šimon Bělík	3–0	Quadri Aruna	walkover

=== Group 6 ===
Pos	Team	Pld	W	L	MF	MA	MR	Pts	Qualification
1	Sweden	4	4	0	12	2	6.000	8	Round of 16
2	Hong Kong	4	3	1	11	3	3.667	7	Playoffs
3	Serbia	4	2	2	6	8	0.750	6	Playoffs
4	Slovakia	4	1	3	4	11	0.364	5	
5	Puerto Rico	4	0	4	3	12	0.250	4	

Source: World Table Tennis
Rules for classification: 1) points; 2) head-to-head points; 3) head-to-head match ratio.

16 February 2024; 10:00	Serbia	3–1	Puerto Rico

	Individual matches
Dimitrije Levajac	3–1	Daniel González	11–8, 3–11, 11–9, 11–8
Zsolt Peto	0–3	Brian Afanador	6–11, 7–11, 7–11
Marko Jevtović	3–1	Angel Naranjo	11–5, 11–13, 11–9, 11–3
Dimitrije Levajac	3–1	Brian Afanador	11–6, 7–11, 11–7, 11–9

16 February 2024; 20:00	Sweden	3–0	Slovakia

	Individual matches
Anton Källberg	3–1	Ľubomír Pištej	9–11, 11–7, 14–12, 11–3
Truls Möregårdh	3–0	Wang Yang	11–9, 11–9, 11–3
Mattias Falck	3–0	Jakub Zelinka	11–9, 11–8, 11–7

17 February 2024; 13:00	Slovakia	0–3	Hong Kong

	Individual matches
Ľubomír Pištej	1–3	Lam Siu-hang	8–11, 11–1, 6–11, 8–11
Wang Yang	2–3	Wong Chun-ting	12–10, 5–11, 11–9, 5–11, 4–11
Jakub Zelinka	2–3	Ho Kwan-kit	11–2, 11–9, 9–11, 3–11, 6–11

17 February 2024; 17:00	Sweden	3–0	Puerto Rico

	Individual matches
Mattias Falck	3–0	Brian Afanador	11–9, 11–4, 11–7
Anton Källberg	3–0	Daniel González	11–8, 15–13, 11–7
Kristian Karlsson	3–2	Angel Naranjo	6–11, 11–5, 11–7, 9–11, 11–8

18 February 2024; 13:00	Sweden	3–2	Hong Kong

	Individual matches
Truls Möregårdh	3–0	Lam Siu-hang	11–6, 11–7, 11–6
Anton Källberg	1–3	Wong Chun-ting	3–11, 8–11, 11–7, 9–11
Kristian Karlsson	3–0	Ho Kwan-kit	11–5, 11–8, 11–7
Truls Möregårdh	1–3	Wong Chun-ting	9–11, 7–11, 11–4, 8–11
Anton Källberg	3–1	Lam Siu-hang	11–9, 9–11, 11–9, 11–3

18 February 2024; 20:00	Slovakia	1–3	Serbia

	Individual matches
Wang Yang	3–0	Zsolt Peto	11–8, 11–5, 11–0
Ľubomír Pištej	0–3	Dimitrije Levajac	6–11, 6–11, 10–12
Jakub Zelinka	1–3	Marko Jevtović	9–11, 7–11, 11–6, 8–11
Wang Yang	2–3	Dimitrije Levajac	12–14, 4–11, 11–6, 11–9, 4–11

19 February 2024; 10:00	Hong Kong	3–0	Puerto Rico

	Individual matches
Lam Siu-hang	3–0	Brian Afanador	11–2, 11–1, 11–9
Wong Chun-ting	3–0	Daniel González	11–7, 11–8, 11–8
Yiu Kwan-to	3–1	Angel Naranjo	12–10, 6–11, 11–8, 11–6

19 February 2024; 20:00	Sweden	3–0	Serbia

	Individual matches
Mattias Falck	3–1	Aleksa Gacev	9–11, 16–14, 11–4, 11–6
Truls Möregårdh	3–0	Dimitrije Levajac	12–10, 11–4, 11–4
Kristian Karlsson	3–0	Marko Jevtović	11–3, 11–9, 9–11, 11–7

20 February 2024; 13:00	Hong Kong	3–0	Serbia

	Individual matches
Lam Siu-hang	3–1	Marko Jevtović	9–11, 11–5, 11–7, 11–9
Wong Chun-ting	3–0	Aleksa Gacev	11–8, 11–5, 11–6
Baldwin Chan	3–1	Zsolt Peto	11–4, 8–11, 11–5, 11–7

20 February 2024; 13:00	Puerto Rico	2–3	Slovakia

	Individual matches
Brian Afanador	3–2	Ľubomír Pištej	11–7, 11–13, 11–7, 4–11, 11–7
Daniel González	0–3	Wang Yang	6–11, 7–11, 8–11
Angel Naranjo	3–1	Samuel Arpas	13–11, 10–12, 11–4, 11–6
Brian Afanador	0–3	Wang Yang	8–11, 7–11, 8–11
Daniel González	0–3	Ľubomír Pištej	4–11, 8–11, 9–11

=== Group 7 ===
Pos	Team	Pld	W	L	MF	MA	MR	Pts	Qualification
1	Slovenia	4	4	0	12	2	6.000	8	Round of 16
2	Singapore	4	3	1	10	3	3.333	7	Playoffs
3	Brazil	4	2	2	7	7	1.000	6	Playoffs
4	Canada	4	1	3	3	11	0.273	5	
5	Malaysia	4	0	4	3	12	0.250	4	

Source: World Table Tennis
Rules for classification: 1) points; 2) head-to-head points; 3) head-to-head match ratio.

16 February 2024; 10:00	Singapore	3–0	Brazil

	Individual matches
Izaac Quek	3–2	Guilherme Teodoro	11–9, 10–12, 9–11, 11–4, 11–7
Koen Pang	3–1	Vitor Ishiy	11–8, 8–11, 11–5, 11–4
Clarence Chew	3–2	Carlos Ishida	11–5, 11–4, 9–11, 11–13, 11–6

16 February 2024; 10:00	Canada	3–2	Malaysia

	Individual matches
Edward Ly	1–3	Wong Qi Shen	8–11, 11–6, 6–11, 8–11
Eugene Wang	1–3	Javen Choong	6–11, 11–7, 8–11, 8–11
Simeon Martin	3–2	Leong Chee Feng	12–10, 5–11, 12–10, 7–11, 11–8
Edward Ly	3–1	Javen Choong	7–11, 11–8, 11–9, 11–5
Eugene Wang	3–1	Wong Qi Shen	11–9, 13–15, 12–10, 11–9

17 February 2024; 10:00	Brazil	3–0	Canada

	Individual matches
Vitor Ishiy	3–1	Eugene Wang	11–6, 11–8, 9–11, 11–7
Guilherme Teodoro	3–0	Edward Ly	11–6, 11–8, 11–9
Carlos Ishida	3–0	Simeon Martin	11–6, 11–6, 11–7

17 February 2024; 13:00	Slovenia	3–1	Singapore

	Individual matches
Darko Jorgić	3–1	Izaac Quek	13–11, 8–11, 15–13, 11–7
Deni Kožul	0–3	Koen Pang	13–15, 6–11, 7–11
Peter Hribar	3–1	Clarence Chew	14–12, 11–9, 6–11, 11–6
Darko Jorgić	3–1	Koen Pang	11–7, 11–9, 7–11, 11–9

18 February 2024; 10:00	Brazil	1–3	Slovenia

	Individual matches
Vitor Ishiy	2–3	Deni Kožul	14–12, 4–11, 4–11, 11–6, 6–11
Guilherme Teodoro	0–3	Darko Jorgić	4–11, 9–11, 4–11
Carlos Ishida	3–2	Peter Hribar	11–5, 4–11, 11–6, 8–11, 11–8
Vitor Ishiy	0–3	Darko Jorgić	8–11, 8–11, 5–11

18 February 2024; 17:00	Singapore	3–0	Malaysia

	Individual matches
Izaac Quek	3–0	Javen Choong	11–9, 11–9, 11–6
Koen Pang	3–0	Wong Qi Shen	12–10, 11–6, 11–9
Clarence Chew	3–0	Leong Chee Feng	15–13, 12–10, 11–9

19 February 2024; 10:00	Brazil	3–1	Malaysia

	Individual matches
Vitor Ishiy	3–1	Javen Choong	5–11, 11–8, 11–9, 11–5
Guilherme Teodoro	2–3	Wong Qi Shen	11–3, 8–11, 9–11, 11–9, 7–11
Carlos Ishida	3–1	Leong Chee Feng	8–11, 12–10, 11–8, 12–10
Vitor Ishiy	3–0	Wong Qi Shen	11–3, 11–7, 11–4

19 February 2024; 20:00	Slovenia	3–0	Canada

	Individual matches
Darko Jorgić	3–0	Simeon Martin	11–4, 11–4, 11–3
Deni Kozul	3–1	Edward Ly	9–11, 11–9, 11–8, 11–6
Peter Hribar	3–0	Matteo Martin	12–10, 11–4, 11–7

20 February 2024; 13:00	Singapore	3–0	Canada

	Individual matches
Pang Koen	3–0	Simeon Martin	11–5, 11–7, 11–6
Izaac Quek	3–0	Matteo Martin	11–2, 11–2, 11–9
Clarence Chew	3–0	Jordan Grewal	11–5, 11–6, 11–6

20 February 2024; 13:00	Slovenia	3–0	Malaysia

	Individual matches
Darko Jorgić	3–2	Wong Qi Shen	11–9, 10–12, 11–2, 9–11, 11–4
Deni Kožul	3–0	Javen Choong	11–6, 13–11, 11–6
Peter Hribar	3–0	Fong Jay Shern	11–3, 11–6, 11–8

=== Group 8 ===
Pos	Team	Pld	W	L	MF	MA	MR	Pts	Qualification
1	Portugal	4	4	0	12	2	6.000	8	Round of 16
2	Romania	4	3	1	9	5	1.800	7	Playoffs
3	Iran	4	2	2	8	7	1.143	6	Playoffs
4	Egypt	4	1	3	5	10	0.500	5	
5	Thailand	4	0	4	2	12	0.167	4	

Source: World Table Tennis
Rules for classification: 1) points; 2) head-to-head points; 3) head-to-head match ratio.

16 February 2024; 20:00	Portugal	3–0	Romania

	Individual matches
Marcos Freitas	3–2	Eduard Ionescu	7–11, 11–3, 8–11, 14–12, 13–11
João Geraldo	3–0	Ovidiu Ionescu	11–9, 11–9, 12–10
Tiago Apolónia	3–1	Iulian Chiriță	8–11, 11–6, 11–6, 11–7

16 February 2024; 20:00	Iran	3–0	Thailand

	Individual matches
Noshad Alamian	3–0	Sitisak Nuchchart	11–4, 11–4, 11–9
Nima Alamian	3–0	Padasak Tanviriyavechakul	11–8, 11–3, 11–5
Amir Hossein Hodaei	3–0	Sarayut Tancharoen	11–4, 11–9, 11–8

17 February 2024; 13:00	Egypt	0–3	Romania

	Individual matches
Omar Assar	1–3	Eduard Ionescu	6–11, 12–10, 8–11, 9–11
Youssef Abdel-Aziz	0–3	Ovidiu Ionescu	7–11, 4–11, 6–11
Mohamed El-Beiali	1–3	Darius Movileanu	10–12, 8–11, 11–3, 12–14

17 February 2024; 20:00	Portugal	3–1	Iran

	Individual matches
Marcos Freitas	3–2	Nima Alamian	10–12, 11–13, 11–8, 14–12, 11–5
João Geraldo	1–3	Noshad Alamian	11–6, 15–17, 10–12, 8–11
Tiago Apolónia	3–2	Amir Hossein Hodaei	11–8, 11–5, 4–11, 9–11, 13–11
Marcos Freitas	3–2	Noshad Alamian	9–11, 12–10, 6–11, 11–7, 11–2

18 February 2024; 20:00	Romania	3–1	Thailand

	Individual matches
Ovidiu Ionescu	3–0	Padasak Tanviriyavechakul	11–4, 14–12, 11–4
Darius Movileanu	2–3	Sitisak Nuchchart	9–11, 11–6, 7–11, 11–9, 7–11
Andrei Istrate	3–1	Napat Thanmathikom	12–10, 11–6, 9–11, 11–9
Ovidiu Ionescu	3–0	Sitisak Nuchchart	11–6, 11–7, 11–7

18 February 2024; 20:00	Portugal	3–1	Egypt

	Individual matches
Marcos Freitas	3–0	Youssef Abdel-Aziz	11–8, 11–5, 11–5
João Geraldo	2–3	Omar Assar	11–8, 13–11, 6–11, 9–11, 3–11
Tiago Apolónia	3–2	Mohamed El-Beiali	4–11, 11–8, 13–15, 11–5, 11–3
Marcos Freitas	3–2	Omar Assar	11–4, 14–12, 7–11, 5–11, 11–7

19 February 2024; 13:00	Portugal	3–0	Thailand

	Individual matches
Tiago Apolónia	3–1	Sitisak Nuchchart	11–3, 11–4, 9–11, 11–4
Diogo Carvalho	3–0	Napat Thanmathikom	11–3, 15–13, 11–8
João Geraldo	3–1	Padasak Tanviriyavechakul	11–7, 6–11, 11–7, 7–11, 11–5

19 February 2024; 20:00	Iran	3–1	Egypt

	Individual matches
Noshad Alamian	3–1	Youssef Abdel-Aziz	6–11, 11–6, 11–3, 11–8
Nima Alamian	3–0	Omar Assar	11–6, 11–9, 11–8
Amir Hossein Hodaei	1–3	Mohamed El-Beiali	9–11, 8–11, 11–7, 9–11
Noshad Alamiyan	3–2	Omar Assar	11–8, 9–11–8, 7–11, 11–5

20 February 2024; 13:00	Egypt	3–1	Thailand

	Individual matches
Omar Assar	3–2	Napat Thanmathikom	15–13, 4–11, 8–11, 11–8, 11–9
Youssef Abdel-Aziz	3–0	Sitisak Nuchchart	11–4, 12–10, 11–6
Mohamed Shouman	2–3	Sarayut Tancharoen	11–8, 9–11, 11–8, 8–11, 8–11
Omar Assar	3–0	Sitisak Nuchchart	11–6, 11–4, 11–6

20 February 2024; 13:00	Romania	3–1	Iran

	Individual matches
Eduard Ionescu	1–3	Nima Alamian	10–12, 5–11, 11–5, 7–11
Ovidiu Ionescu	3–2	Noshad Alamian	11–9, 6–11, 9–11, 11–7, 11–4
Darius Movileanu	3–1	Amir Hossein Hodaei	6–11, 12–10, 11–5, 12–10
Eduard Ionescu	3–2	Noshad Alamiyan	11–8, 6–11, 8–11, 11–6, 11–6

== Knockout stage ==
=== Bracket ===
Round of 32
England	0
Romania	3
Hong Kong	2
Austria	3
Hungary	1
Denmark	3
Kazakhstan	2
India	3
Czech Republic	0
Poland	3
Croatia	3
Brazil	0
Serbia	0
Chinese Taipei	3
Singapore	0
Iran	3

Round of 16
China	3
Romania	0
Austria	0
Japan	3
Slovenia	2
Denmark	3
India	0
South Korea	3
France	3
Poland	0
Croatia	1
Portugal	3
Sweden	2
Chinese Taipei	3
Iran	0
Germany	3

Quarter-finals
China	3
Japan	0
Denmark	1
South Korea	3
France	3
Portugal	1
Chinese Taipei	3
Germany	0

Semi-finals
China	3
South Korea	2
France	3
Chinese Taipei	1

Final
China	3
France	0

=== Playoffs ===
21 February 2024; 13:00	England	0–3	Romania

	Individual matches
Tom Jarvis	0–3	Eduard Ionescu	10–12, 5–11, 7–11
Paul Drinkhall	2–3	Ovidiu Ionescu	11–3, 11–8, 8–11, 8–11, 8–11
Sam Walker	1–3	Darius Movileanu	2–11, 12–10, 7–11, 7–11

21 February 2024; 13:00	Hong Kong	2–3	Austria

	Individual matches
Wong Chun-ting	3–0	Andreas Levenko	14–12, 11–9, 11–3
Lam Siu-hang	1–3	Daniel Habesohn	4–11, 12–14, 11–9, 9–11
Baldwin Chan	2–3	Robert Gardos	11–9, 11–3, 9–11, 6–11, 10–12
Wong Chun-ting	3–0	Daniel Habesohn	11–6, 11–5, 11–6
Lam Siu-hang	2–3	Andreas Levenko	6–11, 12–10, 10–12, 11–8, 8–11

21 February 2024; 13:00	Denmark	3–1	Hungary

	Individual matches
Jonathan Groth	3–1	Tamás Lakatos	16–18, 11–6, 14–12, 11–7
Anders Lind	3–0	Ádám Szudi	12–10, 11–9, 14–12
Tobias Rasmussen	1–3	Csaba András	10–12, 11–9, 6–11, 10–12
Jonathan Groth	3–1	Ádám Szudi	11–5, 11–9, 9–11, 11–5

21 February 2024; 13:00	Kazakhstan	2–3	India

	Individual matches
Kirill Gerassimenko	3–2	Harmeet Desai	9–11, 12–10, 11–8, 7–11, 11–8
Alan Kurmangaliyev	2–3	Sharath Kamal	11–6, 11–7, 7–11, 11–13, 9–11
Aidos Kenzhigulov	1–3	Sathiyan Gnanasekaran	6–11, 11–5, 3–11, 7–11
Kirill Gerassimenko	3–1	Sharath Kamal	11–4, 11–9, 6–11, 11–7
Alan Kurmangaliyev	1–3	Harmeet Desai	6–11, 8–11, 11–8, 7–11

21 February 2024; 13:00	Poland	3–0	Czech Republic

	Individual matches
Jakub Dyjas	3–1	Jiří Martinko	11–6, 7–11, 11–5, 11–9
Samuel Kulczycki	3–2	Lubomír Jančařík	11–5, 11–8, 9–11, 6–11, 14–12
Milosz Redzimski	3–0	Šimon Bělík	11–4, 11–2, 11–8

21 February 2024; 13:00	Brazil	0–3	Croatia

	Individual matches
Vitor Ishiy	0–3	Andrej Gaćina	9–11, 5–11, 8–11
Guilherme Teodoro	2–3	Tomislav Pucar	7–11, 11–3, 8–11, 11–8, 8–11
Carlos Ishida	0–3	Filip Zeljko	6–11, 7–11, 8–11

21 February 2024; 13:00	Serbia	0–3	Chinese Taipei

	Individual matches
Dimitrije Levajac	1–3	Chuang Chih-yuan	8–11, 3–11, 11–8, 6–11
Aleksa Gacev	0–3	Lin Yun-ju	4–11, 10–12, 12–14
Marko Jevtović	0–3	Kao Cheng-jui	2–11, 4–11, 7–11

21 February 2024; 13:00	Singapore	0–3	Iran

	Individual matches
Koen Pang	1–3	Nima Alamian	11–6, 10–12, 6–11, 6–11
Izaac Quek	0–3	Noshad Alamian	6–11, 6–11, 4–11
Clarence Chew	0–3	Amir Hossein Hodaei	6–11, 5–11, 5–11

=== Round of 16 ===
21 February 2024; 20:00	Romania	0–3	China

	Individual matches
Ovidiu Ionescu	0–3	Wang Chuqin	10–12, 1–11, 4–11
Eduard Ionescu	0–3	Fan Zhendong	3–11, 6–11, 5–11
Darius Movileanu	0–3	Ma Long	8–11, 4–11, 2–11

21 February 2024; 20:00	Japan	3–0	Austria

	Individual matches
Tomokazu Harimoto	3–1	Andreas Levenko	8–11, 11–7, 11–7, 11–8
Hiroto Shinozuka	3–1	Robert Gardos	11–4, 9–11, 11–6, 11–9
Sora Matsushima	3–0	Daniel Habesohn	11–4, 11–3, 11–6

21 February 2024; 20:00	Slovenia	2–3	Denmark

	Individual matches
Darko Jorgić	3–0	Tobias Rasmussen	11–5, 11–5, 11–7
Peter Hribar	1–3	Anders Lind	7–11, 11–9, 9–11, 10–12
Deni Kožul	1–3	Jonathan Groth	7–11, 6–11, 11–9, 5–11
Darko Jorgić	3–1	Anders Lind	11–5, 5–11, 11–9, 11–9
Peter Hribar	2–3	Tobias Rasmussen	11–6, 8–11, 13–11, 9–11, 8–11

21 February 2024; 20:00	South Korea	3–0	India

	Individual matches
Jang Woo-jin	3–0	Harmeet Desai	12–10, 13–11, 11–7
Lim Jong-hoon	3–1	Sharath Kamal	11–9, 11–5, 8–11, 11–4
Lee Sang-su	3–0	Sathiyan Gnanasekaran	11–5, 11–8, 11–2

21 February 2024; 20:00	France	3–0	Poland

	Individual matches
Félix Lebrun	3–1	Milosz Redzimski	10–12, 11–6, 11–2, 11–7
Alexis Lebrun	3–2	Jakub Dyjas	13–15, 11–6, 11–5, 10–12, 11–8
Simon Gauzy	3–1	Samuel Kulczycki	7–11, 13–11, 11–8, 12–10

21 February 2024; 20:00	Portugal	3–1	Croatia

	Individual matches
Marcos Freitas	3–0	Andrej Gaćina	11–4, 11–7, 11–5
Tiago Apolónia	3–0	Filip Zeljko	11–9, 11–8, 11–4
João Geraldo	0–3	Tomislav Pucar	12–14, 8–11, 5–11
Marcos Freitas	3–0	Filip Zeljko	11–3, 11–9, 11–4

21 February 2024; 20:00	Sweden	2–3	Chinese Taipei

	Individual matches
Truls Möregårdh	3–1	Kao Cheng-jui	11–6, 5–11, 11–7, 11–7
Mattias Falck	0–3	Lin Yun-ju	8–11, 5–11, 8–11
Anton Källberg	3–2	Feng Yi-hsin	11–9, 7–11, 8–11, 11–5, 11–7
Truls Möregårdh	0–3	Lin Yun-ju	9–11, 11–13, 7–11
Mattias Falck	0–3	Kao Cheng-jui	1–11, 2–11, 9–11

21 February 2024; 20:00	Germany	3–0	Iran

	Individual matches
Dang Qiu	3–1	Noshad Alamian	11–4, 10–12, 11–4, 11–8
Dimitrij Ovtcharov	3–0	Nima Alamian	11–7, 11–9, 11–8
Patrick Franziska	3–2	Amir Hossein Hodaei	5–11, 11–5, 14–12, 8–11, 11–7

=== Quarterfinals ===
22 February 2024; 13:00	Portugal	1–3	France

	Individual matches
Marcos Freitas	3–1	Alexis Lebrun	12–14, 14–12, 11–9, 11–6
Tiago Apolónia	0–3	Félix Lebrun	6–11, 8–11, 9–11
João Geraldo	1–3	Simon Gauzy	9–11, 11–5, 7–11, 7–11
Marcos Freitas	1–3	Félix Lebrun	11–5, 5–11, 6–11, 8–11

22 February 2024; 20:00	China	3–0	Japan

	Individual matches
Fan Zhendong	3–1	Sora Matsushima	11–13, 12–10, 12–10, 11–6
Wang Chuqin	3–1	Tomokazu Harimoto	8–11, 11–2, 11–7, 11–6
Ma Long	3–1	Hiroto Shinozuka	11–9, 11–5, 9–11, 11–9

23 February 2024; 10:00	South Korea	3–1	Denmark

	Individual matches
Lim Jong-hoon	3–1	Anders Lind	11–8, 11–8, 9–11, 14–12
Jang Woo-jin	1–3	Jonathan Groth	9–11, 9–11, 11–5, 3–11
An Jae-hyun	3–0	Martin Buch Andersen	11–2, 13–11, 11–7
Lim Jong-hoon	3–1	Jonathan Groth	9–11, 12–10, 11–6, 11–8

23 February 2024; 17:00	Germany	0–3	Chinese Taipei

	Individual matches
Dang Qiu	2–3	Chuang Chih-yuan	8–11, 11–6, 1–11, 11–8, 9–11
Dimitrij Ovtcharov	2–3	Lin Yun-ju	11–9, 11–8, 9–11, 9–11, 9–11
Patrick Franziska	1–3	Kao Cheng-jui	11–9, 14–16, 9–11, 9–11

=== Semifinals ===
24 February 2024; 13:00	South Korea	2–3	China

	Individual matches
Jang Woo-jin	3–1	Wang Chuqin	11–7, 2–11, 13–11, 11–6
Lim Jong-hoon	0–3	Fan Zhendong	8–11, 6–11, 8–11
Lee Sang-su	3–2	Ma Long	11–7, 4–11, 12–10, 6–11, 11–4
Jang Woo-jin	0–3	Fan Zhendong	6–11, 7–11, 10–12
Lim Jong-hoon	0–3	Wang Chuqin	5–11, 7–11, 6–11

24 February 2024; 17:00	France	3–1	Chinese Taipei

	Individual matches
Félix Lebrun	3–1	Chuang Chih-yuan	5–11, 13–11, 11–8, 11–6
Alexis Lebrun	0–3	Lin Yun-ju	10–12, 10–12, 5–11
Simon Gauzy	3–0	Kao Cheng-jui	11–5, 11–7, 11–6
Félix Lebrun	3–0	Lin Yun-ju	11–7, 12–10, 11–8

=== Final ===
25 February 2024; 20:00	France	0–3	China

	Individual matches
Félix Lebrun	0–3	Wang Chuqin	4–11, 8–11, 3–11
Alexis Lebrun	2–3	Fan Zhendong	11–9, 4–11, 11–8, 10–12, 7–11
Simon Gauzy	1–3	Ma Long	11–7, 2–11, 4–11, 6–11
