= 2026 European Table Tennis Championships – Men's singles =

Men's singles at the 2026 European Table Tennis Championships
- Venue: Arena Stožice
- Location: Ljubljana, Slovenia
- Dates: 11–18 October

Medalists
gold medal	(France) Felix Lebrun
silver medal	(Sweden) Anton Källberg
bronze medal	(France) Leo De Nodrest
bronze medal	(Germany) Dang Qiu

The men's singles competition of the 2026 European Table Tennis Championships is being held from 11 to 18 October 2026.

== Format ==
The singles competition features a two-stage qualification.

=== Stage 1: Qualification Group Stage ===
- Eligibility: All players seeded 33 and beyond compete in this stage.
- Group Composition: Players are divided randomly into groups of 4.
- Match Length: Best-of-5 games.
- Advancement: The group winner advances to the Main Draw.

=== Stage 2: Main Draw ===
- The Bracket: A fixed single-elimination knockout bracket consisting of 64 players.
- Composition:
  - The top 32 seeded players
  - The 32 qualification group winners.
- Match Length: Best-of-7 games.

=== Tie-Breaking Regulations ===
If players are tied on match points within a group, positions are determined by:

1. Head-to-Head: The result of the match between the two tied players.
2. Game Ratio: If three players are tied, the ratio of games won divided by games lost in matches exclusively between the tied players.
3. Point Ratio: If still tied, the ratio of total rally points won divided by points lost between the tied players.

== Seeds ==
- Seeding was determined by the European Table Tennis Union European Rankings released in October 2026.

1. (France) Félix Lebrun
2. (France) Alexis Lebrun
3. (Sweden) Truls Möregårdh
4. (Slovenia) Darko Jorgić
5. (Germany) Benedikt Duda
6. (Sweden) Anton Källberg
7. (Germany) Dang Qiu
8. (Germany) Patrick Franziska
9. (France) Simon Gauzy
10. (Denmark) Anders Lind
11. (Portugal) Marcos Freitas
12. (Croatia) Tomislav Pucar
13. (Spain) Álvaro Robles
14. (Romania) Eduard Ionescu
15. (France) Thibault Poret
16. (Sweden) Kristian Karlsson
17. (Portugal) João Geraldo
18. (Germany) André Bertelsmeier
19. (Denmark) Jonathan Groth
20. (Croatia) Andrej Gaćina
21. (Poland) Miłosz Redzimski
22. (England) Tom Jarvis
23. (Romania) Iulian Chiriță
24. (Belgium) Adrien Rassenfosse
25. (Czech Republic) Lubomír Jančařík
26. (Moldova) Vladislav Ursu
27. (Belgium) Cédric Nuytinck
28. (Slovenia) Deni Kozul
29. (Slovakia) Ľubomír Pištej
30. (Belgium) Martin Allegro
31. (Individual Neutral Athletes) Vladimir Sidorenko
32. (France) Flavien Coton

== Main draw ==
=== Finals ===
Semifinals								Final
1	(France) Félix Lebrun	6	11	5	11	11	14
	(France) Leo De Nodrest (bronze)	11	8	11	7	8	12	1	(France) Félix Lebrun
6	(Sweden) Anton Källberg	11	9	9	11	11	11	6	(Sweden) Anton Källberg
7	(Germany) Dang Qiu (bronze)	9	11	11	8	5	4

=== Upper Half ===
==== Section 1 ====
First Round
1	(France) Félix Lebrun	4
(Poland) Maciej Kubik	0
(Croatia) Ivor Ban	4
29	(Slovakia) Ľubomír Pištej	0
19	(Croatia) Andrej Gaćina	1
(Sweden) Elias Ranefur	4
(Individual Neutral Athletes) Evgeny Tikhonov	4
13	(Spain) Álvaro Robles	1
12	(Croatia) Tomislav Pucar	4
(Turkey) Abdullah Yigenler	1
(Turkey) Görkem Ocal	0
17	(Portugal) João Geraldo	4
28	(Slovenia) Deni Kozul	4
(England) Liam Pitchford	0
(Romania) Ovidiu Ionescu	0
8	(Germany) Patrick Franziska	4

Second Round
1	(France) Félix Lebrun	4
(Croatia) Ivor Ban	0
(Sweden) Elias Ranefur	4
(Individual Neutral Athletes) Evgeny Tikhonov	3
12	(Croatia) Tomislav Pucar	4
17	(Portugal) João Geraldo	3
28	(Slovenia) Deni Kozul	0
8	(Germany) Patrick Franziska	4

Third Round
1	(France) Félix Lebrun	4
(Sweden) Elias Ranefur	2
12	(Croatia) Tomislav Pucar	3
8	(Germany) Patrick Franziska	4

Quarterfinals
1	(France) Félix Lebrun	4
8	(Germany) Patrick Franziska	0

==== Section 2 ====
First Round
5	(Germany) Benedikt Duda	4
(Austria) Maciej Kolodziejczyk	0
(Romania) Andrei Istrate	0
22	(England) Tom Jarvis	4
31	(Individual Neutral Athletes) Vladimir Sidorenko	3
(Finland) Benedek Olah	4
(Hungary) Ádám Szudi	2
14	(Romania) Eduard Ionescu	4
15	(France) Thibault Poret	1
(Slovakia) Wang Yang	4
(France) Leo De Nodrest	4
24	(Belgium) Adrien Rassenfosse	1
21	(Poland) Miłosz Redzimski	4
(Norway) Martin Frøseth	1
(Spain) Diego Lillo	3
4	(Slovenia) Darko Jorgić	4

Second Round
5	(Germany) Benedikt Duda	4
22	(England) Tom Jarvis	0
(Finland) Benedek Olah	4
14	(Romania) Eduard Ionescu	3
(Slovakia) Wang Yang	3
(France) Leo De Nodrest	4
21	(Poland) Miłosz Redzimski	3
4	(Slovenia) Darko Jorgić	4

Third Round
5	(Germany) Benedikt Duda	4
(Finland) Benedek Olah	1
(France) Leo De Nodrest	4
4	(Slovenia) Darko Jorgić	3

Quarterfinals
5	(Germany) Benedikt Duda	3
(France) Leo De Nodrest	4

=== Lower Half ===
==== Section 3 ====
First Round
3	(Sweden) Truls Möregårdh	4
(Netherlands) Ivan Kahn	0
(Austria) Robert Gardos	3
20	(Germany) André Bertelsmeier	4
25	(Czech Republic) Lubomír Jančařík	0
(Norway) Borgar Haug	4
(Hungary) Csaba Andras	1
11	(Portugal) Marcos Freitas	4
10	(Denmark) Anders Lind	0
(Greece) Panagiotis Gionis w/o	4
(Italy) Matteo Mutti	4
30	(Belgium) Martin Allegro	0
23	(Romania) Iulian Chiriță	4
(Germany) Ricardo Walther	1
(Individual Neutral Athletes) Nikita Artemenko	3
6	(Sweden) Anton Källberg	4

Second Round
3	(Sweden) Truls Möregårdh	4
20	(Germany) André Bertelsmeier	0
(Norway) Borgar Haug	4
11	(Portugal) Marcos Freitas	3
(Greece) Panagiotis Gionis	4
(Italy) Matteo Mutti	0
23	(Romania) Iulian Chiriță	2
6	(Sweden) Anton Källberg	4

Third Round
3	(Sweden) Truls Möregårdh	2
(Norway) Borgar Haug	4
(Greece) Panagiotis Gionis	0
6	(Sweden) Anton Källberg	4

Quarterfinals
(Norway) Borgar Haug	2
6	(Sweden) Anton Källberg	4

==== Section 4 ====
First Round
7	(Germany) Dang Qiu	4
(Serbia) Dimitrije Levajac	0
(Germany) Wim Verdonschot	1
19	(Denmark) Jonathan Groth	4
32	(France) Flavien Coton	4
(England) Connor Green	2
(Italy) John Oyebode	2
9	(France) Simon Gauzy	4
16	(Sweden) Kristian Karlsson	4
(Germany) Kay Stumper	1
(Finland) Alex Naumi	4
27	(Belgium) Cédric Nuytinck	0
26	(Moldova) Vladislav Ursu	4
(Croatia) Filip Zeljko	3
(Portugal) Tiago Apolonia	0
2	(France) Alexis Lebrun	4

Second Round
7	(Germany) Dang Qiu	4
19	(Denmark) Jonathan Groth	0
32	(France) Flavien Coton	2
9	(France) Simon Gauzy	4
16	(Sweden) Kristian Karlsson	4
(Finland) Alex Naumi	3
26	(Moldova) Vladislav Ursu	2
2	(France) Alexis Lebrun	4

Third Round
7	(Germany) Dang Qiu	4
9	(France) Simon Gauzy	1
16	(Sweden) Kristian Karlsson	2
2	(France) Alexis Lebrun	4

Quarterfinals
7	(Germany) Dang Qiu	4
2	(France) Alexis Lebrun	1
