= 2022 European Table Tennis Championships – Men's doubles =

Men's doubles at the 2022 European Table Tennis Championships
- Venue: Rudi-Sedlmayer-Halle
- Location: Munich, Germany
- Dates: 13–18 August
- Competitors: 100 from 36 nations

Medalists
gold medal	Mattias Falck (SWE); Kristian Karlsson (SWE)
silver medal	Daniel Habesohn (AUT); Robert Gardos (AUT)
bronze medal	Alexis Lebrun (FRA); Félix Lebrun (FRA)
bronze medal	Jon Persson (SWE); Anton Källberg (SWE)

The men's doubles competition of the 2022 European Table Tennis Championships was held from 13 to 18 August 2022.2. Demir Kurudere

== Playing system ==
World MD ranking week 28; 12.07.2022.
52 pairs
16 pairs are directly qualified for the main draw as a seeded pairs.
Qualification stage: 36 pairs will play qualification in two preliminary rounds. The winners of the preliminary round 2 matches will qualify for the Main draw.

== Preliminary round ==
The winners of the preliminary round 2 matches will qualify for the Main draw.

Round of 64
M Frøseth (NOR); A Reinholds (LAT)	1
F Radović (MNE); F Radulović (MNE)	3

Round of 32
A Chen (AUT); D Serdaroglu (AUT)	3
J Masip (ESP); C Caballero (ESP)	1
A Smirnov (EST); T Libene (EST)	1
M Redzimski (POL); V Ursu (MDA)	3
I Chirița (ROU); D Berzosa (ESP)	3
I Pryshchepa (UKR); A Grebeniuk (UKR)	1
T Rasmussen (DEN); M Andersen (DEN)	3
J Zelinka (SVK); A Klajber (SVK)	1
L Mladenovic (LUX); E Glod (LUX)	3
F Giardi (SMR); M Mongiusti (SMR)	0
P Krastev (BUL); T Alexandrov (BUL)	0
P Hribar (SLO); T Cvetko (SLO)	3
D Levajac (SRB); A Puțuntică (MDA)	3
B Moullet (SUI); L Stoll (SUI)	0
F Zeljko (CRO); F Kojić (CRO)	3
B Oláh (FIN); A Naumi (FIN)	2
A Rassenfosse (BEL); B Haug (NOR)	3
Y Zhmudenko (UKR); A Limonov (UKR)	0
I Navickas (LTU); K Žeimys (LTU)	0
AT Yiğenler (TUR); İ Gündüz (TUR)	3
A Lind (DEN); Y Wang (SVK)	3
Z Peto (SRB); M Jevtović (SRB)	1
F Mladenovski (MKD); F Karabaxhak (KOS)	0
J Groth (DEN); L Pitchford (ENG)	3
E Lebesson (FRA); S Gauzy (FRA)	3
F Radović (MNE); F Radulović (MNE)	0
G Konstantinopoulos (GRE); I Sgouropoulos (GRE)	3
D Kogans (LAT); I Nielsen (GRL)	0
T Israeli (ISR); J Piccolin (ITA)	3
G Stamatouros (GRE); K Konstantinopoulos (GRE)	2
M Tauber (ISR); M Yiangou (CYP)	0
M Kubik (POL); S Kulczycki (POL)	3

== Main Draw ==
Main Draw

Round of 32
1	M Falck (SWE); K Karlsson (SWE)	3
A Chen (AUT); D Serdaroglu (AUT)	1
T Rasmussen (DEN); M Andersen (DEN)	3
12	S Walker (ENG); T Jarvis (ENG)	0
14	J Majoros (HUN); A Csaba (HUN)	3
AT Yiğenler (TUR); İ Gündüz (TUR)	0
P Hribar (SLO); T Cvetko (SLO)	1
8	F Lambiet (BEL); M Allegro (BEL)	3
5	C Nuytinck (BEL); J Dyjas (POL)	3
F Zeljko (CRO); F Kojić (CRO)	1
E Lebesson (FRA); S Gauzy (FRA)	2
13	J Persson (SWE); A Källberg (SWE)	3
10	N Stoyanov (ITA); M Bobocica (ITA)	3
A Lind (DEN); Y Wang (SVK)	0
M Kubik (POL); S Kulczycki (POL)	3
4	Á Szudi (HUN); N Ecseki (HUN)	1
3	Á Robles (ESP); O Ionescu (ROU)	3
L Mladenovic (LUX); E Glod (LUX)	2
M Redzimski (POL); V Ursu (MDA)	3
11	D Movileanu (ROU); E Ionescu (ROU)	1
9	T Polanský (CZE); D Jorgić (SLO)	2
D Levajac (SRB); A Puțuntică (MDA)	3
T Israeli (ISR); J Piccolin (ITA)	0
7	A Lebrun (FRA); F Lebrun (FRA)	3
6	D Habesohn (AUT); R Gardos (AUT)	3
I Chirița (ROU); D Berzosa (ESP)	2
A Rassenfosse (BEL); B Haug (NOR)	1
14	P Širuček (CZE); J Martinko (CZE)	3
16	Ľ Pištej (SVK); A Karakašević (SRB)	3
J Groth (DEN); L Pitchford (ENG)	2
G Konstantinopoulos (GRE); I Sgouropoulos (GRE)	1
2	D Qiu (GER); B Duda (GER)	3

Round of 16
1	M Falck (SWE); K Karlsson (SWE)	3
T Rasmussen (DEN); M Andersen (DEN)	1
14	J Majoros (HUN); A Csaba (HUN)	0
8	F Lambiet (BEL); M Allegro (BEL)	3
5	C Nuytinck (BEL); J Dyjas (POL)	2
13	J Persson (SWE); A Källberg (SWE)	3
10	N Stoyanov (ITA); M Bobocica (ITA)	1
M Kubik (POL); S Kulczycki (POL)	3
3	Á Robles (ESP); O Ionescu (ROU)	1
M Redzimski (POL); V Ursu (MDA)	3
D Levajac (SRB); A Puțuntică (MDA)	0
7	A Lebrun (FRA); F Lebrun (FRA)	3
6	D Habesohn (AUT); R Gardos (AUT)	3
13	P Širuček (CZE); J Martinko (CZE)	2
16	Ľ Pištej (SVK); A Karakašević (SRB)	1
2	D Qiu (GER); B Duda (GER)	3

Quarterfinals
1	M Falck (SWE); K Karlsson (SWE)	3
8	F Lambiet (BEL); M Allegro (BEL)	0
13	J Persson (SWE); A Källberg (SWE)	3
M Kubik (POL); S Kulczycki (POL)	2
M Redzimski (POL); V Ursu (MDA)	1
7	A Lebrun (FRA); F Lebrun (FRA)	3
6	D Habesohn (AUT); R Gardos (AUT)	3
2	D Qiu (GER); B Duda (GER)	2

Semifinals
1	M Falck (SWE); K Karlsson (SWE)	3
13	J Persson (SWE); A Källberg (SWE)	1
7	A Lebrun (FRA); F Lebrun (FRA)	1
6	D Habesohn (AUT); R Gardos (AUT)	3

Final
1	M Falck (SWE); K Karlsson (SWE)	3
6	D Habesohn (AUT); R Gardos (AUT)	1

== Participating nations ==
100 players from 36 nations.

- Austria (4)
- Belgium (4)
- Bulgaria (2)
- Croatia (2)
- Cyprus (1)
- Czech Republic (3)
- Denmark (4)
- England (3)
- Estonia (2)
- Finland (2)
- France (4)
- Germany (2)
- Greece (4)
- Greenland (1)
- Hungary (4)
- Israel (2)
- Italy (3)
- Kosovo (1)
- Latvia (2)
- Lithuania (2)
- Luxembourg (2)
- Moldova (2)
- North Macedonia (1)
- Montenegro (2)
- Norway (2)
- Poland (4)
- Romania (4)
- San Marino (2)
- Serbia (4)
- Slovakia (4)
- Slovenia (3)
- Spain (4)
- Sweden (4)
- Switzerland (2)
- Turkey (2)
- Ukraine (4)
