= Table tennis at the 2024 Summer Olympics – Men's team =

Table tennis – Men's team at the Games of the XXXIII Olympiad
- Venue: Paris Expo Porte de Versailles
- Date: 5–9 August
- Competitors: 48 from 16 nations
- Teams: 16

Medalists
1st place, gold medalist(s)		Wang Chuqin; Ma Long; Fan Zhendong	China
2nd place, silver medalist(s)		Anton Källberg; Truls Möregårdh; Kristian Karlsson	Sweden
3rd place, bronze medalist(s)		Félix Lebrun; Alexis Lebrun; Simon Gauzy	France

The men's team table tennis event was part of the table tennis programme at the 2024 Summer Olympics in Paris. The event took place from 5 to 9 August 2024 at Paris Expo Porte de Versailles.

This was the last appearance of the Men's team event before replaced by Men's doubles event. Marking the doubles events returned at LA 2028, for the first time since Athens 2004.

== Format ==
Teams were made up of three players. Each team match was made up of five individual matches and ended when either side has won three matches. The order of a team match was as follows: a doubles match, two singles matches, and if neither side had won three matches by this point, a maximum of two extra singles matches were played.

Order of a team match
		ABC team	vs	XYZ team
1	Doubles	B + C	vs	Y + Z
2	Singles	A	vs	X
3	Singles	C	vs	Z
4	Singles	A	vs	Y
5	Singles	B	vs	X

== Schedule ==
Legend
P	Preliminary round	¼	Quarter-finals	½	Semi-finals	F	Final

Mon 5	Tue 6		Wed 7		Thu 8	Fri 9
P	P	¼	¼	½	½	F

== Draw ==
The draw was held on 24 July 2024.

== Seeds ==
The ITTF world team ranking published on 16 July 2024 was used for seeding purposes.

Rank	Team	Athletes (world ranking on 16 July 2024)		
1	China	Wang Chuqin (1)	Ma Long (3)	Fan Zhendong (4)
2	Germany	Dang Qiu (11)	Dimitrij Ovtcharov (14)	Timo Boll (24)
3	France	Félix Lebrun (5)	Alexis Lebrun (16)	Simon Gauzy (29)
4	Japan	Tomokazu Harimoto (9)	Shunsuke Togami (15)	Hiroto Shinozuka (39)
5	South Korea	Jang Woo-jin (13)	Cho Dae-seong (20)	Lim Jong-hoon (30)
6	Chinese Taipei	Lin Yun-ju (8)	Kao Cheng-jui (32)	Chuang Chih-yuan (36)
7	Sweden	Anton Källberg (25)	Truls Möregårdh (26)	Kristian Karlsson (60)
8	Portugal	Marcos Freitas (17)	Tiago Apolónia (66)	João Geraldo (71)
9	Brazil	Hugo Calderano (6)	Vitor Ishiy (85)	Guilherme Teodoro (122)
10	Denmark	Jonathan Groth (23)	Anders Lind (62)	Martin Buch Anderson (279)
11	Croatia	Tomislav Pucar (53)	Andrej Gaćina (68)	Filip Zeljko (121)
12	Slovenia	Darko Jorgić (18)	Deni Kožul (126)	Peter Hribar (249)
13	Egypt	Mohamed El-Beiali (47)	Youssef Abdel-Aziz (92)	Khalid Assar (142)
14	India	Sharath Kamal Achanta (40)	Manav Vikash Thakkar (56)	Harmeet Desai (86)
15	Australia	Nicholas Lum (38)	Finn Luu (44)	Hwan Bae (281)
16	Canada	Edward Ly (37)	Eugene Wang (106)	Jeremy Hazin (538)

== Bracket ==
First round
1	China	3
14	India	0
11	Croatia	0
5	South Korea	3
8	Portugal	1
9	Brazil	3
12	Slovenia	0
3	France	3
4	Japan	3
15	Australia	0
13	Egypt	0
6	Chinese Taipei	3
7	Sweden	3
10	Denmark	0
16	Canada	0
2	Germany	3

Quarterfinals
1	China	3
5	South Korea	0
9	Brazil	0
3	France	3
4	Japan	3
6	Chinese Taipei	1
7	Sweden	3
2	Germany	0

Semifinals
1	China	3
3	France	0
4	Japan	2
7	Sweden	3

Gold medal match
1	China	3
7	Sweden	0
Bronze medal match
3	France	3
4	Japan	2

== Results ==
All times are local (UTC+2).

=== First round ===
5 August 2024; 10:00	Sweden	3–0	Denmark

Report	Individual matches
Anton Källberg / Kristian Karlsson	3–1	Martin Buch Andersen / Jonathan Groth	11–13, 11–8, 11–6, 11–3
Truls Möregårdh	3–2	Anders Lind	11–7, 9–11, 11–13, 11–5, 11–9
Kristian Karlsson	3–0	Jonathan Groth	11–8, 12–10, 11–7

5 August 2024; 10:00	Egypt	0–3	Chinese Taipei

Report	Individual matches
Khalid Assar / Youssef Adbel-Aziz	2–3	Chuang Chih-yuan / Kao Cheng-jui	12–10, 13–11, 9–11, 6–11, 9–11
Mohamed El-Beiali	0–3	Lin Yun-ju	7–11, 10–12, 7–11
Youssef Adbel-Aziz	1–3	Kao Cheng-jui	10–12, 11–9, 6–11, 9–11

5 August 2024; 15:00	Japan	3–0	Australia

Report	Individual matches
Shunsuke Togami / Hiroto Shinozuka	3–0	Nicholas Lum / Finn Luu	11–8, 11–6, 11–6
Tomokazu Harimoto	3–0	Hwan Bae	11–4, 11–4, 14–12
Hiroto Shinozuka	3–0	Finn Luu	11–9, 11–7, 11–2

5 August 2024; 15:00	Portugal	1–3	Brazil

Report	Individual matches
Tiago Apolónia / Marcos Freitas	2–3	Vitor Ishiy / Guilherme Teodoro	10–12, 9–11, 11–7, 11–8, 10–12
João Geraldo	0–3	Hugo Calderano	11–13, 5–11, 7–11
Marcos Freitas	3–0	Guilherme Teodoro	11–7, 12–10, 11–4
João Geraldo	2–3	Vitor Ishiy	12–14, 11–8, 11–8, 9–11, 12–14

5 August 2024; 20:00	France	3–0	Slovenia

Report	Individual matches
Simon Gauzy / Alexis Lebrun	3–0	Peter Hribar / Deni Kožul	11–9, 11–7, 11–7
Félix Lebrun	3–2	Darko Jorgić	11–8, 8–11, 5–11, 11–4, 11–9
Alexis Lebrun	3–1	Deni Kožul	11–8, 6–11, 11–4, 11–5

5 August 2024; 20:00	Canada	0–3	Germany

Report	Individual matches
Jeremy Hazin / Eugene Wang	1–3	Dang Qiu / Timo Boll	5–11, 11–8, 8–11, 5–11
Edward Ly	1–3	Dimitrij Ovtcharov	4–11, 11–9, 6–11, 5–11
Eugene Wang	0–3	Timo Boll	8–11, 5–11, 10–12

6 August 2024; 10:00	China	3–0	India

Report	Individual matches
Ma Long / Wang Chuqin	3–0	Harmeet Desai / Manav Thakkar	11–2, 11–3, 11–7
Fan Zhendong	3–1	Sharath Kamal	9–11, 11–7, 11–7, 11–5
Wang Chuqin	3–0	Manav Thakkar	11–9, 11–6, 11–9

6 August 2024; 10:00	Croatia	0–3	South Korea

Report	Individual matches
Filip Zeljko / Andrej Gaćina	0–3	Cho Dae-seong / Jang Woo-jin	4–11, 7–11, 6–11
Tomislav Pucar	0–3	Lim Jong-hoon	2–11, 7–11, 9–11
Andrej Gaćina	1–3	Jang Woo-jin	6–11, 11–7, 6–11, 4–11

=== Quarterfinals ===
6 August 2024; 15:00	Japan	3–1	Chinese Taipei

Report	Individual matches
Hiroto Shinozuka / Shunsuke Togami	3–0	Chuang Chih-yuan / Kao Cheng-jui	11–7, 11–5, 11–9
Tomokazu Harimoto	2–3	Lin Yun-ju	9–11, 11–9, 7–11, 11–3, 6–11
Shunsuke Togami	3–0	Kao Cheng-jui	11–5, 11–7, 11–5
Tomokazu Harimoto	3–0	Chuang Chih-yuan	11–7, 11–8, 11–9

6 August 2024; 20:00	Sweden	3–0	Germany

Report	Individual matches
Kristian Karlsson / Anton Källberg	3–0	Dang Qiu / Timo Boll	12–10, 11–8, 11–8
Truls Möregårdh	3–2	Dimitrij Ovtcharov	11–9, 8–11, 7–11, 11–8, 11–9
Anton Källberg	3–1	Timo Boll	11–7, 11–9, 7–11, 11–8

7 August 2024; 10:00	China	3–0	South Korea

Report	Individual matches
Ma Long / Wang Chuqin	3–0	Cho Dae-seong / Jang Woo-jin	11–5, 11–9, 11–5
Fan Zhendong	3–1	Lim Jong-hoon	11–7, 9–11, 11–9, 11–6
Wang Chuqin	3–1	Jang Woo-jin	11–7, 6–11, 11–8,11–9

7 August 2024; 15:00	Brazil	0–3	France

Report	Individual matches
Guilherme Teodoro / Vitor Ishiy	0–3	Simon Gauzy / Alexis Lebrun	8–11, 9–11, 6–11
Hugo Calderano	1–3	Félix Lebrun	6–11, 7–11, 13–11, 6–11
Vitor Ishiy	1–3	Alexis Lebrun	6–11, 11–9, 5–11, 7–11

=== Semifinals ===
7 August 2024; 20:00	Japan	2–3	Sweden

Report	Individual matches
Hiroto Shinozuka / Shunsuke Togami	3–1	Anton Källberg / Kristian Karlsson	8–11, 11–9, 11–4, 11–7
Tomokazu Harimoto	3–1	Truls Möregårdh	13–11, 9–11, 11–5, 12–10
Shunsuke Togami	1–3	Kristian Karlsson	11–7, 9–11, 9–11, 5–11
Hiroto Shinozuka	1–3	Truls Möregårdh	5–11, 6–11, 11–5, 10–12
Tomokazu Harimoto	2–3	Anton Källberg	11–5, 11–5, 7–11, 7–11, 9–11

8 August 2024; 10:00	China	3–0	France

Report	Individual matches
Ma Long / Wang Chuqin	3–0	Simon Gauzy / Alexis Lebrun	13–11, 11–5, 11–2
Fan Zhendong	3–1	Félix Lebrun	11–3, 13–11, 8–11,16–14
Wang Chuqin	3–1	Alexis Lebrun	7–11, 11–8, 11–9, 11–1

=== Bronze medal game ===
9 August 2024; 10:00	France	3–2	Japan

Report	Individual matches
Simon Gauzy / Alexis Lebrun	3–1	Hiroto Shinozuka / Shunsuke Togami	11-5, 11–7, 5–11, 11–6
Félix Lebrun	3–2	Tomokazu Harimoto	11–13, 11–4, 9–11, 11–6, 12–10
Alexis Lebrun	1–3	Shunsuke Togami	8–11, 9–11, 11–9, 9–11
Simon Gauzy	1–3	Tomokazu Harimoto	8–11, 11–8, 8–11, 12–14
Félix Lebrun	3–1	Hiroto Shinozuka	11–7, 11–7, 12–14, 13–11

=== Gold medal game ===
9 August 2024; 15:00	China	3–0	Sweden

Report	Individual matches
Ma Long / Wang Chuqin	3–2	Anton Källberg / Kristian Karlsson	8–11, 11–4, 11–3, 6–11, 11–7
Fan Zhendong	3–2	Truls Möregårdh	10–12, 11–8, 11–9, 11–13, 11–5
Wang Chuqin	3–2	Kristian Karlsson	11–9, 11–5, 10–12, 10–12, 11–2
