= Table tennis at the 2023 European Games – Men's singles =

Table tennis – Men's singles at the 2023 European Games
- Venue: Hutnik Arena
- Location: Kraków, Poland
- Date: 23–27 June
- Competitors: 49 from 26 nations

Medalists
| gold medal | Félix Lebrun | France |
| silver medal | Marcos Freitas | Portugal |
| bronze medal | Alexis Lebrun | France |

The men's singles in table tennis at the 2023 European Games in Kraków was held at the Hutnik Arena from 23 to 27 June 2023.

== Seeds ==
Seeding was based on the ITTF World Ranking lists published on 20 June 2023.

1. Dang Qiu (GER) (quarterfinals)
2. Truls Möregårdh (SWE) (fourth round)
3. Dimitrij Ovtcharov (GER) (fourth round)
4. Darko Jorgić (SLO) (quarterfinals)
5. Alexis Lebrun (FRA) (semifinals, bronze medalist)
6. Kristian Karlsson (SWE) (fourth round)
7. Andrej Gaćina (CRO) (semifinals, fourth place)
8. Félix Lebrun (FRA) (champion, gold medalist)
9. Liam Pitchford (GBR) (third round)
10. Tomislav Pucar (CRO) (third round)
11. João Geraldo (POR) (third round)
12. Álvaro Robles (ESP) (third round)
13. Jonathan Groth (DEN) (fourth round)
14. Robert Gardos (AUT) (fourth round)
15. Anders Lind (DEN) (fourth round)
16. Wang Yang (SVK) (third round)

== Draw ==
=== Finals ===
Semifinals
5 | Alexis Lebrun (FRA) | 9 | 11 | 11 | 10 | 8 | 6
Marcos Freitas (POR) | 11 | 7 | 8 | 12 | 11 | 11
8 | Félix Lebrun (FRA) | 11 | 11 | 11 | 13
7 | Andrej Gaćina (CRO) | 9 | 4 | 3 | 11

Gold medal match
Marcos Freitas (POR) | 11 | 5 | 5 | 11 | 11 | 2 | 11
8 | Félix Lebrun (FRA) | 9 | 11 | 11 | 4 | 6 | 11 | 13
Bronze medal match
5 | Alexis Lebrun (FRA) | w/o
7 | Andrej Gaćina (CRO)

=== Top half ===
==== Section 1 ====
Second round
Pryshchepa (UKR) | 11 | 11 | 7 | 7 | 11 | 6 | 10
Drinkhall (GBR) | 9 | 9 | 11 | 11 | 9 | 11 | 12
Stoyanov (ITA) | 11 | 11 | 8 | 11 | 6 | 11
Redzimski (POL) | 9 | 6 | 11 | 8 | 11 | 5
Puțuntică (MDA) | 2 | 12 | 1 | 11 | 7
Jančařík (CZE) | 11 | 10 | 11 | 13 | 11
Gionis (GRE) | 11 | 11 | 11 | 11
Gündüz (TUR) | 5 | 3 | 6 | 4

Third round
1 | Qiu (GER) | 11 | 11 | 11 | 11
Drinkhall (GBR) | 9 | 7 | 8 | 19
Stoyanov (ITA) | 13 | 11 | 13 | 11
16 | Wang (SVK) | 11 | 8 | 11 | 7
13 | Groth (DEN) | 12 | 7 | 11 | 11 | 11
Jančařík (CZE) | 10 | 11 | 8 | 9 | 4
Gionis (GRE) | 5 | 11 | 6 | 11 | 4 | 8
5 | A. Lebrun (FRA) | 11 | 8 | 11 | 9 | 11 | 11

Fourth round
1 | Qiu (GER) | 11 | 11 | 11 | 11
Stoyanov (ITA) | 8 | 2 | 4 | 7
13 | Groth (DEN) | 11 | 9 | 8 | 11 | 11 | 7 | 8
5 | A. Lebrun (FRA) | 6 | 11 | 11 | 6 | 9 | 11 | 11

Quarterfinals
1 | Qiu (GER) | 12 | 9 | 10 | 4 | 12
5 | A. Lebrun (FRA) | 10 | 11 | 12 | 11 | 14

==== Section 2 ====
Second round
Szudi (HUN) | 7 | 13 | 7 | 11 | 12 | 8 | 7
Rassenfosse (BEL) | 11 | 11 | 11 | 9 | 10 | 11 | 11
Freitas (POR) | 11 | 11 | 11 | 11
Levajac (SRB) | 9 | 7 | 3 | 8
Caballero (ESP) | 6 | 12 | 6 | 9 | 2
Oláh (FIN) | 11 | 10 | 11 | 11 | 11
O. Ionescu (ROU) | 11 | 11 | 11 | 11
Mladenovic (LUX) | 1 | 6 | 9 | 6

Third round
6 | Karlsson (SWE) | 11 | 11 | 12 | 11
Rassenfosse (BEL) | 8 | 8 | 10 | 6
Freitas (POR) | 11 | 11 | 11 | 7 | 9 | 11
10 | Pucar (CRO) | 9 | 7 | 7 | 11 | 11 | 1
14 | Gardos (AUT) | 8 | 14 | 11 | 11 | 11
Oláh (FIN) | 10 | 12 | 8 | 9 | 4
O. Ionescu (ROU) | 11 | 10 | 10 | 11 | 9 | 10
4 | Jorgić (SLO) | 8 | 12 | 12 | 9 | 11 | 12

Fourth round
6 | Karlsson (SWE) | 11 | 11 | 11 | 6 | 11 | 8 | 9
Freitas (POR) | 7 | 6 | 13 | 11 | 5 | 11 | 11
14 | Gardos (AUT) | 2 | 9 | 14 | 12 | 7 | 10
4 | Jorgić (SLO) | 11 | 11 | 12 | 10 | 11 | 12

Quarterfinals
Freitas (POR) | 11 | 11 | 11 | 8 | 11 | 11
4 | Jorgić (SLO) | 9 | 7 | 9 | 11 | 13 | 4

=== Bottom half ===
==== Section 3 ====
| First round |
| Mongiusti (SMR) | 5 | 9 | 11 | 2 | 6 |
| Peto (SRB) | 11 | 11 | 5 | 11 | 11 |

Second round
Haug (NOR) | 11 | 11 | 7 | 11 | 10 | 11
Majoros (HUN) | 8 | 7 | 11 | 6 | 12 | 3
E. Ionescu (ROU) | 11 | 11 | 11 | 11
Peto (SRB) | 9 | 6 | 8 | 4
Polanský (CZE) | 9 | 9 | 11 | 11 | 7 | 12 | 6
Zhmudenko (UKR) | 11 | 11 | 9 | 3 | 11 | 10 | 11
Bobocica (ITA) | 14 | 7 | 2 | 7 | 8
Ursu (MDA) | 12 | 11 | 11 | 11 | 11

Third round
3 | Ovtcharov (GER) | 11 | 11 | 11 | 11
Haug (NOR) | 7 | 8 | 5 | 8
E. Ionescu (ROU) | 11 | 18 | 10 | 11 | 12
12 | Robles (ESP) | 8 | 16 | 12 | 7 | 10
15 | Lind (DEN) | 10 | 11 | 11 | 11 | 10 | 11
Zhmudenko (UKR) | 12 | 6 | 9 | 6 | 12 | 8
Ursu (MDA) | 9 | 7 | 12 | 13
8 | F. Lebrun (FRA) | 11 | 11 | 14 | 15

Fourth round
3 | Ovtcharov (GER) | 11 | 11 | 12 | 7 | 10 | 5
E. Ionescu (ROU) | 7 | 7 | 14 | 11 | 12 | 11
15 | Lind (DEN) | 11 | 10 | 11 | 7 | 14 | 5
8 | F. Lebrun (FRA) | 13 | 12 | 6 | 11 | 12 | 11

Quarterfinals
E. Ionescu (ROU) | 14 | 2 | 10 | 11 | 5 | 5
8 | F. Lebrun (FRA) | 12 | 11 | 12 | 9 | 11 | 11

==== Section 4 ====
Second round
Dyjas (POL) | 11 | 11 | 7 | 8 | 9 | 11 | 5
Kožul (SLO) | 8 | 4 | 11 | 11 | 11 | 7 | 11
Nuytinck (BEL) | 11 | 11 | 11 | 11
Glod (LUX) | 3 | 7 | 6 | 5
Sgouropoulos (GRE) | 8 | 11 | 10 | 6 | 9
Habesohn (AUT) | 11 | 8 | 12 | 11 | 11
Pištej (SVK) | 13 | 11 | 11 | 11
Naumi (FIN) | 11 | 7 | 7 | 4

Third round
7 | Gaćina (CRO) | 9 | 11 | 9 | 11 | 11 | 11
Kožul (SLO) | 11 | 7 | 11 | 7 | 2 | 9
Nuytinck (BEL) | 8 | 10 | 4 | 11 | 11 | 11 | 11
11 | Geraldo (POR) | 11 | 12 | 11 | 8 | 9 | 4 | 7
9 | Pitchford (GBR) | 11 | 8 | 11 | 12 | 8 | 5 | 5
Habesohn (AUT) | 6 | 11 | 6 | 10 | 11 | 11 | 11
Pištej (SVK) | 5 | 9 | 8 | 9
2 | Möregårdh (SWE) | 11 | 11 | 11 | 11

Fourth round
7 | Gaćina (CRO) | 10 | 11 | 11 | 11 | 11
Nuytinck (BEL) | 12 | 8 | 4 | 9 | 6
Habesohn (AUT) | 11 | 6 | 12 | 12 | 11 | 3 | 11
2 | Möregårdh (SWE) | 6 | 11 | 10 | 10 | 13 | 11 | 7

Quarterfinals
7 | Gaćina (CRO) | 11 | 9 | 11 | 12 | 11
Habesohn (AUT) | 7 | 11 | 9 | 10 | 9
