= Table tennis at the 2023 European Games – Men's team =

Table tennis – Men's team at the 2023 European Games
- Venue: Hutnik Arena
- Location: Kraków, Poland
- Date: 28 June – 1 July
- Nations: 12
- Teams: 12

Medalists
gold medal	Timo Boll; Patrick Franziska; Dimitrij Ovtcharov; Dang Qiu	Germany
silver medal	Simon Berglund; Anton Källberg; Kristian Karlsson; Truls Möregårdh	Sweden
bronze medal	Can Akkuzu; Simon Gauzy; Alexis Lebrun; Félix Lebrun	France

The men's team competition in table tennis at the 2023 European Games in Kraków was held at the Hutnik Arena from 28 June to 1 July 2023.

== Seeds ==
1. Germany (GER)
2. Sweden (SWE)
3. France (FRA)
4. Portugal (POR)
5. Slovenia (SLO)
6. Croatia (CRO)
7. Great Britain (GBR)
8. Belgium (BEL)
9. Poland (POL)
10. Denmark (DEN)
11. Slovakia (SVK)
12. Romania (ROU)

== Results ==
=== Bracket ===
Round of 16
28 June
8 Belgium	3
9 Poland	1
28 June
7 Great Britain	1
12 Romania	3
28 June
10 Denmark	3
6 Croatia	1
28 June
11 Slovakia	3
5 Slovenia	0

Quarterfinals
29 June
1 Germany	3
8 Belgium	0
29 June
12 Romania	0
4 Portugal	3
29 June
3 France	3
10 Denmark	0
29 June
11 Slovakia	0
2 Sweden	3

Semifinals
30 June
1 Germany	3
4 Portugal	1
30 June
3 France	2
2 Sweden	3

Gold medal match
1 July
1 Germany	3
2 Sweden	1
Bronze medal match
1 July
3 France	3
4 Portugal	2

=== Round of 16 ===
28 June 2023; 10:00; Report	Romania	3 – 1	Great Britain

Darius Movileanu / Eduard Ionescu	3–1	Tom Jarvis / Paul Drinkhall	11–3, 12–10, 5–11, 11–8
Ovidiu Ionescu	0–3	Liam Pitchford	7–11, 3–11, 6–11
Eduard Ionescu	3–0	Paul Drinkhall	11–7, 11–3, 11–4
Ovidiu Ionescu	3–0	Tom Jarvis	11–8, 11–5, 11–6

28 June 2023; 13:00; Report	Denmark	3 – 1	Croatia

Tobias Rasmussen / Anders Lind	3–2	Filip Zeljko / Frane Kojić	9–11, 11–5, 11–6, 12–14, 11–9
Jonathan Groth	1–3	Tomislav Pucar	10–12, 11–5, 8–11, 11–13
Anders Lind	3–1	Frane Kojić	11–8, 4–11, 11–9, 11–7
Jonathan Groth	3–2	Filip Zeljko	9–11, 11–4, 11–7, 5–11, 11–4

28 June 2023; 16:00; Report	Slovakia	3 – 0	Slovenia

Jakub Zelinka / Ľubomír Pištej	3–2	Peter Hribar / Deni Kožul	8–11, 8–11, 11–7, 11–9, 11–9
Wang Yang	3–0	Darko Jorgić	11–9, 11–8, 12–10
Ľubomír Pištej	3–0	Deni Kožul	11–2, 11–1, 11–6

28 June 2023; 19:00; Report	Belgium	3 – 1	Poland

Martin Allegro / Adrien Rassenfosse	0–3	Samuel Kulczycki / Maciej Kubik	14–16, 8–11, 3–11
Cedric Nuytinck	3–2	Jakub Dyjas	8–11, 11–3, 2–11, 11–7, 11–6
Adrien Rassenfosse	3–1	Maciej Kubik	11–9, 11–6, 7–11, 12–10
Cedric Nuytinck	3–2	Samuel Kulczycki	11–9, 9–11, 8–11, 11–8, 11–9

=== Quarterfinals ===
29 June 2023; 10:00; Report	France	3 – 0	Denmark

Simon Gauzy / Alexis Lebrun	3–0	Jonathan Groth / Thor Christensen	11–8, 11–2, 12–10
Félix Lebrun	3–0	Anders Lind	13–11, 11–5, 11–8
Alexis Lebrun	3–0	Thor Christensen	11–8, 11–4, 11–9

29 June 2023; 13:00; Report	Sweden	3 – 0	Slovakia

Kristian Karlsson / Truls Möregårdh	3–0	Jakub Zelinka / Ľubomír Pištej	11–6, 11–2, 11–2
Anton Källberg	3–0	Wang Yang	11–5, 13–11, 11–6
Truls Möregårdh	3–2	Ľubomír Pištej	11–9, 10–12, 11–13, 11–6, 11–7

29 June 2023; 16:00; Report	Portugal	3 – 0	Romania

Tiago Apolónia / João Geraldo	3–2	Darius Movileanu / Eduard Ionescu	11–9, 11–9, 9–11, 12–14, 12–10
Marcos Freitas	3–1	Hunor Szőcs	11–7, 11–6, 11–13, 11–6
João Geraldo	3–2	Eduard Ionescu	10–12, 11–7, 10–12, 11–8, 12–10

29 June 2023; 19:00; Report	Belgium	0 – 3	Germany

Martin Allegro / Adrien Rassenfosse	2–3	Patrick Franziska / Dimitrij Ovtcharov	7–11, 8–11, 11–9, 11–9, 5–11
Cedric Nuytinck	0–3	Dang Qiu	7–11, 7–11, 5–11
Adrien Rassenfosse	0–3	Dimitrij Ovtcharov	5–11, 7–11, 6–11

=== Semifinals ===
30 June 2023; 16:00; Report	France	2 – 3	Sweden

Simon Gauzy / Alexis Lebrun	2–3	Kristian Karlsson / Truls Möregårdh	13–11, 6–11, 11–8, 6–11, 7–11
Félix Lebrun	3–2	Anton Källberg	11–8, 2–11, 5–11, 11–8, 11–7
Alexis Lebrun	0–3	Truls Möregårdh	7–11, 5–11, 14–16
Félix Lebrun	3–1	Kristian Karlsson	6–11, 11–8, 11–6, 11–9
Simon Gauzy	1–3	Anton Källberg	6–11, 11–5, 8–11, 7–11

30 June 2023; 19:00; Report	Portugal	1 – 3	Germany

João Geraldo / Tiago Apolónia	3–0	Patrick Franziska / Dimitrij Ovtcharov	11–7, 11–6, 11–9
Marcos Freitas	0–3	Dang Qiu	4–11, 6–11, 2–11
Tiago Apolónia	0–3	Dimitrij Ovtcharov	8–11, 5–11, 4–11
Marcos Freitas	0–3	Patrick Franziska	5–11, 5–11, 5–11

=== Bronze medal match ===
1 July 2023; 11:00; Report	France	3 – 2	Portugal

Simon Gauzy / Alexis Lebrun	0–3	Marcos Freitas / Tiago Apolónia	10–12, 10–12, 3–11
Félix Lebrun	3–0	João Geraldo	11–6, 11–6, 13–11
Alexis Lebrun	1–3	Tiago Apolónia	8–11, 11–4, 9–11, 11–13
Félix Lebrun	3–1	Marcos Freitas	11–8, 9–11, 13–11, 11–7
Simon Gauzy	3–0	João Geraldo	11–8, 11–9, 11–6

=== Gold medal match ===
1 July 2023; 18:15; Report	Sweden	1 – 3	Germany

Truls Möregårdh / Kristian Karlsson	3–1	Dimitrij Ovtcharov / Patrick Franziska	3–11, 11–9, 15–13, 11–8
Anton Källberg	0–3	Dang Qiu	5–11, 9–11, 9–11
Kristian Karlsson	2–3	Patrick Franziska	11–6, 5–11, 13–11, 8–11, 9–11
Anton Källberg	0–3	Dimitrij Ovtcharov	7–11, 8–11, 8–11
