= Can Akkuzu =

French table tennis player (born 1997)

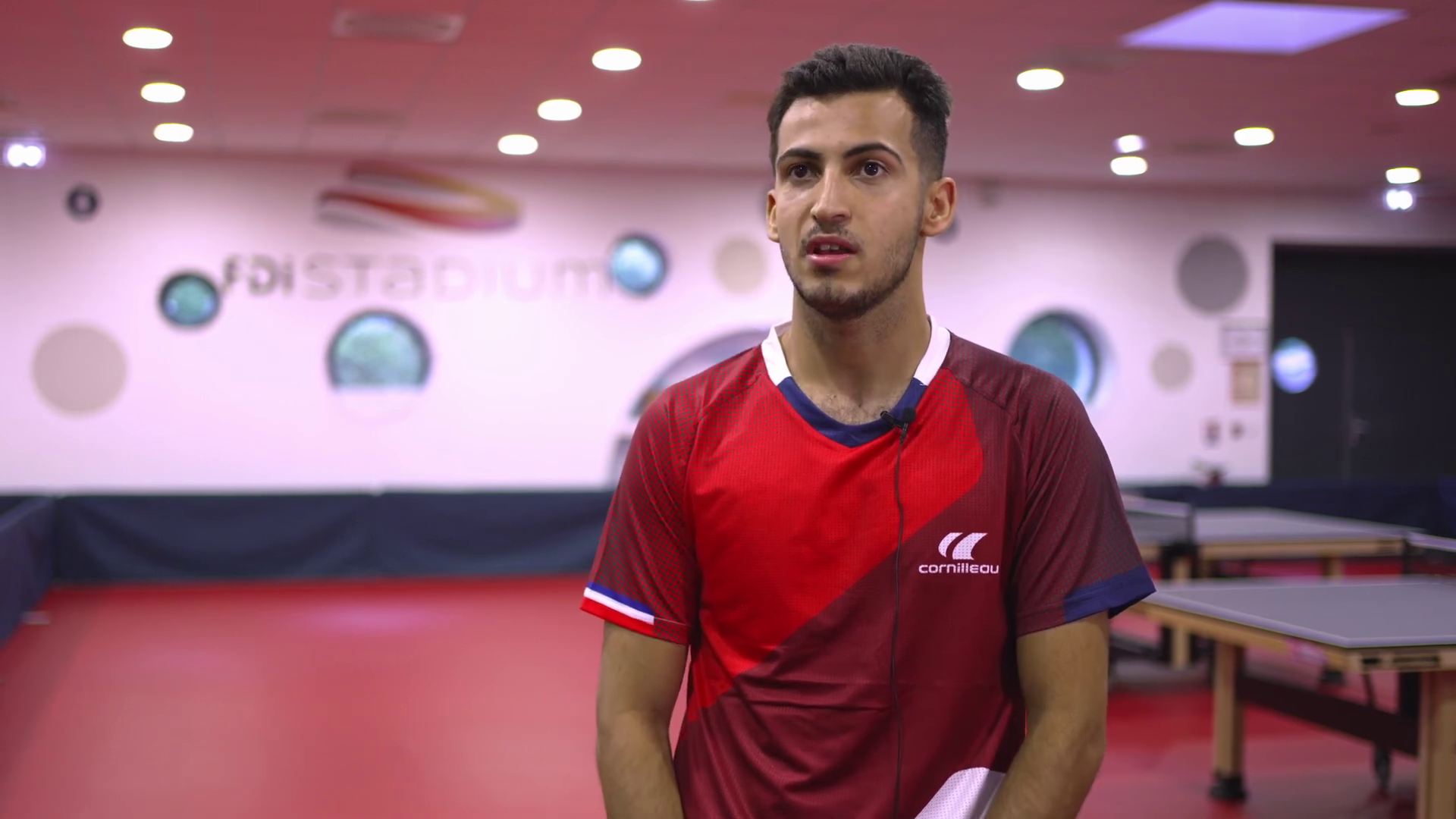
- Can Akkuzu in 2024

Personal information
- Born: 23 May 1997 (age 29) Haguenau, France

Sport
- Sport: Table tennis
- Playing style: Right-handed shakehand
- Highest ranking: 40 (25 July 2023)
- Current ranking: 163 (29 April 2025)
Medal record
Men's table tennis
Representing France
European Games
Bronze medal – third place	2023 Kraków–Małopolska	Team
European Championships
Bronze medal – third place	2023 Malmö	Team

Can Akkuzu (born 27 May 1997) is a French table tennis player.

== Career ==
Can Akkuzu became the national champion of France in singles table tennis in 2019.

During the 2023 European Games, he won the bronze medal in teams composed of Simon Gauzy, Alexis Lebrun, and Felix Lebrun against Portugal.

In 2023 European Table Tennis Championships he won the bronze medal in team.
