= 2023 European Table Tennis Championships =

- Date: 10–17 September 2023
- Location: Malmö, Sweden
- Venue: Malmö Arena
← 2022 ·	European Table Tennis Championships	· 2024 →

The 2023 European Table Tennis Championships were held in Malmö, Sweden from 10 to 17 September 2023. The venue for the competition was Malmö Arena. The competition featured team events for men and women, with the winning teams qualifying for the 2024 Summer Olympics.

German women's team successfully defended their title, securing their ninth team title. Host Swedish men's team ended a 21-year drought to claim their fifteenth team gold.

== Medal summary ==
=== Medalists ===
Event	Gold	Silver	Bronze
Men's team	Sweden; Mattias Falck; Anton Källberg; Kristian Karlsson; Truls Möregårdh; Jon Persson	Germany; Timo Boll; Benedikt Duda; Cedric Meissner; Kay Stumper; Ricardo Walther	France; Can Akkuzu; Alexis Lebrun; Felix Lebrun; Jules Rolland
Men's team	Sweden; Mattias Falck; Anton Källberg; Kristian Karlsson; Truls Möregårdh; Jon Persson	Germany; Timo Boll; Benedikt Duda; Cedric Meissner; Kay Stumper; Ricardo Walther	Portugal; Tiago Apolónia; Marcos Freitas; João Geraldo; João Monteiro
Women's team	Germany; Han Ying; Annett Kaufmann; Nina Mittelham; Shan Xiaona; Sabine Winter	Romania; Adina Diaconu; Andreea Dragoman; Elizabeta Samara; Bernadette Szőcs; Elena Zaharia	France; Charlotte Lutz; Prithika Pavade; Jia Nan Yuan; Audrey Zarif
Women's team	Germany; Han Ying; Annett Kaufmann; Nina Mittelham; Shan Xiaona; Sabine Winter	Romania; Adina Diaconu; Andreea Dragoman; Elizabeta Samara; Bernadette Szőcs; Elena Zaharia	Portugal; Ines Matos; Matilde Pinto; Shao Jieni; Fu Yu

=== Medal table ===
* Host nation (Sweden)

Rank	nation	Gold	Silver	Bronze	Total
1	Germany (GER)	1	1	0	2
2	Sweden (SWE)*	1	0	0	1
3	Romania (ROU)	0	1	0	1
4	France (FRA)	0	0	2	2
4	Portugal (POR)	0	0	2	2
Totals (5 entries)		2	2	4	8
