= Félix Lebrun =

French table tennis player (born 2006)

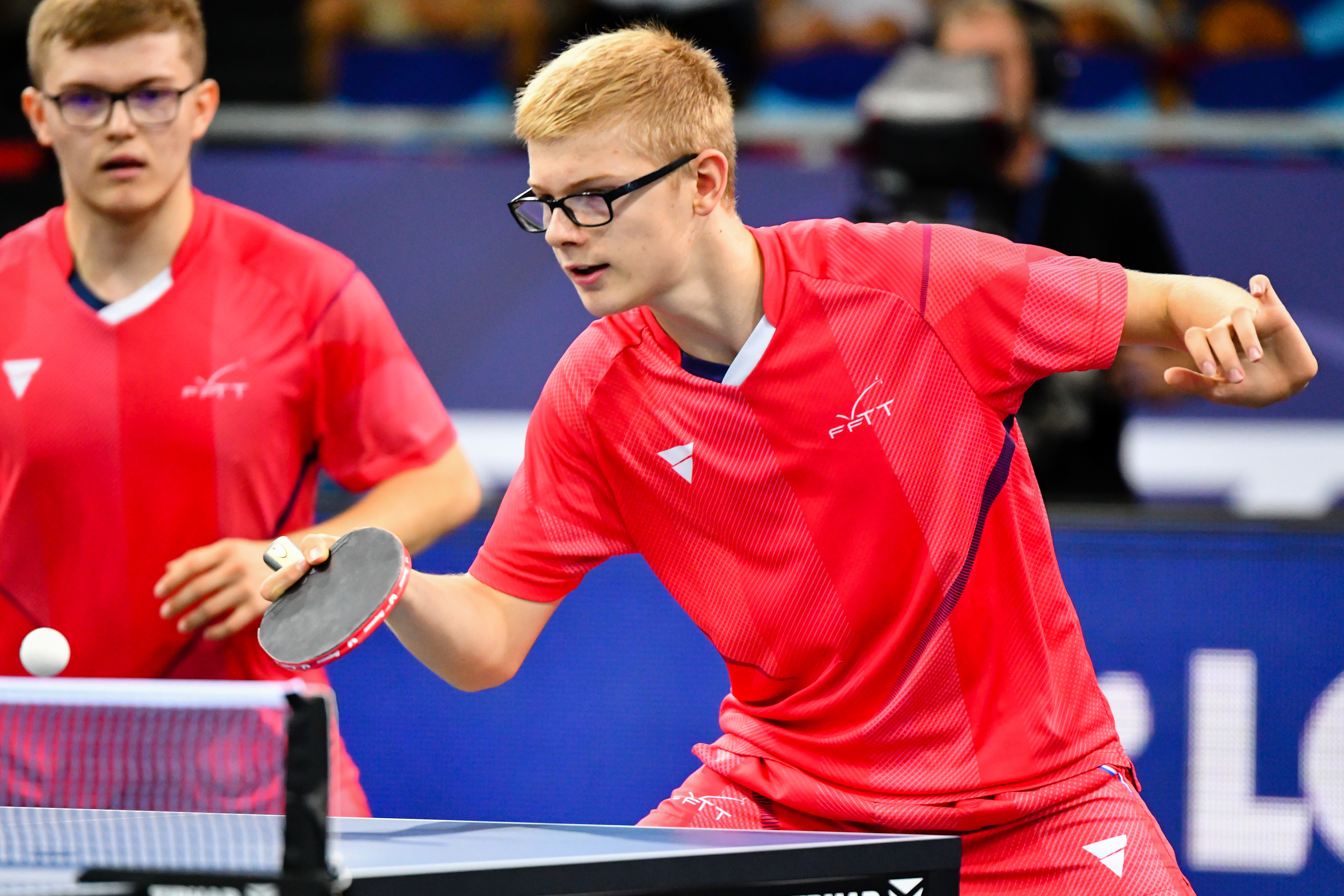
- Lebrun at the 2022 European Championships (with his older brother Alexis Lebrun)

Personal information
- Born: 12 September 2006 (age 20) Montpellier, France
- Height: 1.80 m (5 ft 11 in)

Sport
- Sport: Table tennis
- Playing style: Right-handed penholder
- Equipment: F. Lebrun Hyper Carbon (blade), Hybrid K3 max (rubber)
- Highest ranking: 2 (17 August 2026)
- Current ranking: 2 (28 September 2026)
Medal record
Men's table tennis
Representing France
Olympic Games
Bronze medal – third place	2024 Paris	Singles
Bronze medal – third place	2024 Paris	Team
World Championships
Silver medal – second place	2024 Busan	Team
Bronze medal – third place	2025 Doha	Doubles
Bronze medal – third place	2026 London	Team
European Games
Gold medal – first place	2023 Kraków–Małopolska	Singles
Bronze medal – third place	2023 Kraków–Małopolska	Team
European Championships
Gold medal – first place	2024 Linz	Doubles
Gold medal – first place	2025 Zadar	Team
Gold medal – first place	2026 Ljubljana	Doubles
Gold medal – first place	2026 Ljubljana	Singles
Bronze medal – third place	2022 Munich	Doubles
Bronze medal – third place	2023 Malmö	Team
Europe Top-16
Bronze medal – third place	2026 Montreux	Singles

Félix Lebrun (pronounced [feliks lə.bʁœ̃]; born 12 September 2006) is a French table tennis player and 2025 French national champion. He was a gold medalist at the 2023 European Games and reached the top ten list of the ITTF (International Table Tennis Federation) world ranking for the first time in October 2023. As of 12 November 2024, he was ranked number 4 in the world in the ITTF world rankings, making him the top-ranked French and European player. Stylistically, he plays with a penholder grip (with a reverse penhold backhand), which is a rarity among top players today. He won two bronze medals at the 2024 Summer Olympics, one in individual and one in team, thus becoming at 17 years the youngest ever medalist in those events, and also the youngest male medalist in Olympic table tennis. In October 2024, he became the first French player to win a WTT Champions tournament in Montpellier. By the end of 2024, he also became world's top ranked doubles player along with his elder brother Alexis Lebrun. In March 2025, he became the French national table tennis champion by defeating Alexis in the final.

== Career ==
Born in Montpellier, Lebrun and his older brother Alexis Lebrun were raised in a family connected to table tennis. Their father, Stéphane, was ranked as high as number seven in France, while their uncle Christophe Legoût represented France at three Olympics. Like his brother, Félix Lebrun began his table tennis career at the age of three. He was inspired by Chen Jian, a penhold player from China who trained in Montpellier and Istres, leading him to adopt a penhold grip at the age of four. The Wall Street Journal compared Lebrun's playing style to that of "an old Chinese man", with American player Lily Zhang describing Lebrun's play as "very refreshing".

=== 2023 ===
In 2023, Lebrun won gold at the European Games by defeating Marcos Freitas in a seven-game final. Three months later, he won WTT Contender series event in Antalya. A series of successes propelled him into the top ten of the ITTF world ranking in October.

=== 2024 ===
Lebrun won his second WTT singles event at the WTT Star Contender Goa in 2024. He continued to help the French men's team advance to the final of the 2024 World Team Championships. This marked the French team's first final appearance at the World Team Championships since 1997.

In March, Félix Lebrun became one the youngest players to reached the top 5 of the WTT rankings.

He won the bronze medal at the men's singles table tennis event of the Olympic Games in Paris in 2024 against Hugo Calderano.

In October 2024, he became the first French player to won a WTT Champions tournament in Montpellier. In November 2024, Félix and his brother Alexis became world number one in doubles after their victory at the WTT Finals in Fukuoka.

=== 2025 ===
In March 2025, Felix became the French National Table Tennis Champion by defeating his elder brother Alexis.

== Singles titles ==
Year	Tournament	Final opponent	Score	Ref
2023	European Games	(Portugal) Marcos Freitas	4–3	
2023	WTT Contender Antalya	(Germany) Dimitrij Ovtcharov	4–3	
2024	WTT Star Contender Goa	(Brazil) Hugo Calderano	4–2	
2024	WTT Champions Montpellier	(Japan) Tomokazu Harimoto	4–1	
2025	WTT Contender Tunis	(Denmark) Anders Lind	4–0	
2025	WTT Star Contender Muscat	(France) Alexis Lebrun	4–3	
2026	WTT Champions Chongqing	(China) Wen Ruibo	4–1	
2026	WTT Europe Smash - Sweden	(Japan) Tomokazu Harimoto	4–1	
2026	European Championships	(Sweden) Anton Källberg	4–3	

== See also ==
- Alexis Lebrun, Félix's elder brother and three-time French national champion in table tennis
