= 2024 European Table Tennis Championships =

- Date: 15–20 October 2024
- Edition: 43rd
- Location: Linz, Austria
- Venue: TipsArena Linz
- European Table Tennis Championships

The 2024 European Table Tennis Championships was a table tennis tournament that was held in Linz, Austria, from 15 to 20 October 2024.

== Medalists ==
Event	Gold	Silver	Bronze
Men's singles	Alexis Lebrun; France	Benedikt Duda; Germany	Dimitrij Ovtcharov; Germany
Men's singles	Alexis Lebrun; France	Benedikt Duda; Germany	Truls Möregårdh; Sweden
Women's singles	Sofia Polcanova; Austria	Bernadette Szőcs; Romania	María Xiao; Spain
Women's singles	Sofia Polcanova; Austria	Bernadette Szőcs; Romania	Nina Mittelham; Germany
Men's doubles	France; Alexis Lebrun; Félix Lebrun	Sweden; Anton Källberg; Truls Möregårdh	Austria; Maciej Kolodziejczyk; Moldova; Vladislav Ursu Sweden; Mattias Falck; Kristian Karlsson
Women's doubles	Czech Republic; Hana Matelová; Slovakia; Barbora Balážová	Austria; Sofia Polcanova; Romania; Bernadette Szőcs	Serbia; Izabela Lupulesku; Sabina Surjan Poland; Natalia Bajor; Slovakia; Tatiana Kukulkova
Mixed doubles	Spain; María Xiao; Alvaro Robles	Austria; Sofia Polcanova; Robert Gardos	France; Prithika Pavade; Simon Gauzy Germany; Annett Kaufmann; Patrick Franziska

== Medal table ==
* Host nation (Austria)

Rank	Nation	Gold	Silver	Bronze	Total
1	France	2	0	1	3
2	Austria*	1	1.5	0.5	3
3	Spain	1	0	1	2
4	Slovakia	0.5	0	0.5	1
5	Czech Republic	0.5	0	0	0.5
6	Romania	0	1.5	0	1.5
7	Germany	0	1	3	4
8	Sweden	0	1	2	3
9	Serbia	0	0	1	1
10	Moldova	0	0	0.5	0.5
10	Poland	0	0	0.5	0.5
Totals (11 entries)		5	5	10	20
