= Anton Källberg =

Swedish table tennis player

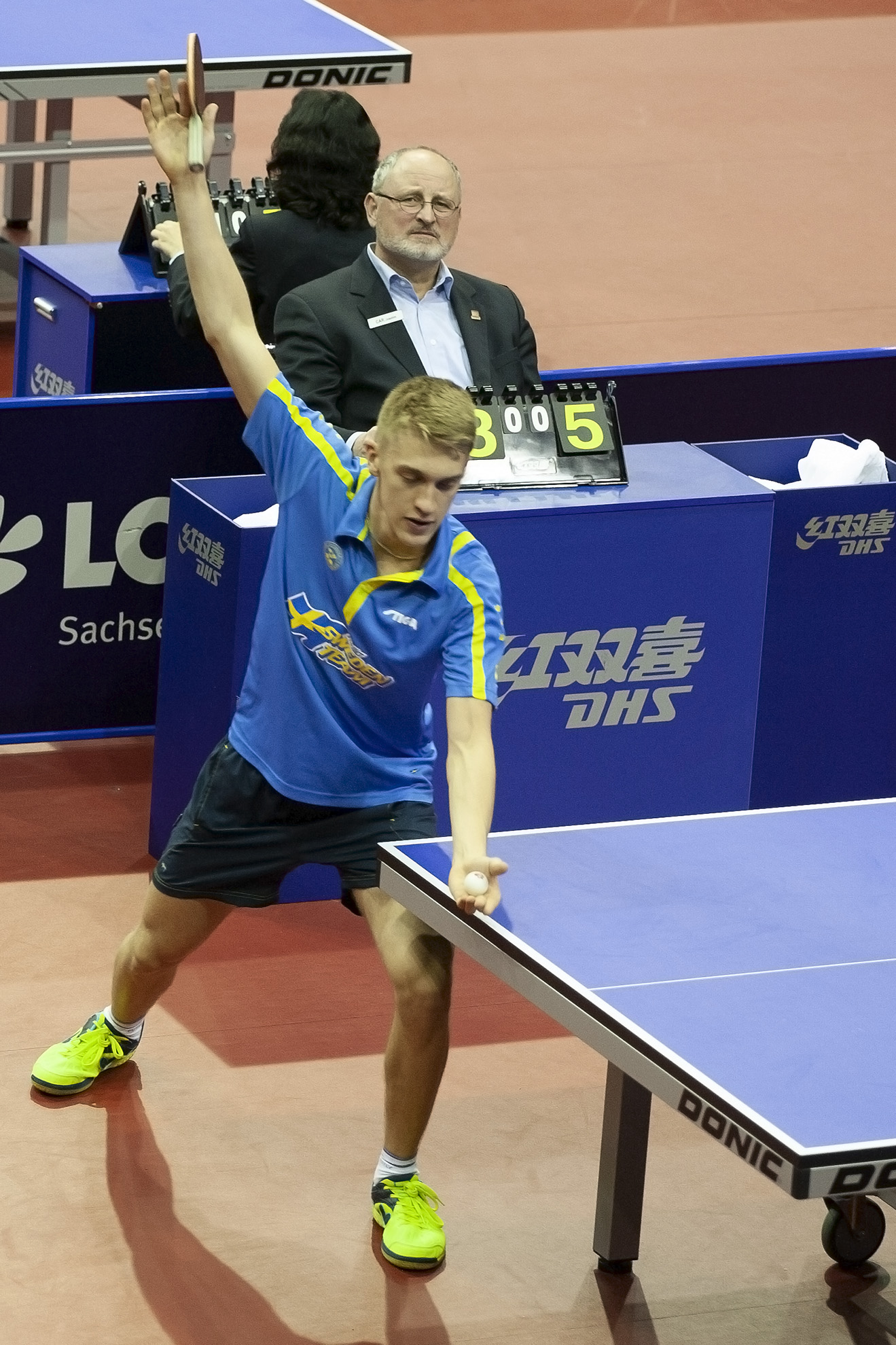
- Källberg at the 2017 German Open

Personal information
- Full name: Anton Sten Anders Källberg
- Born: 17 August 1997 (age 29) Sollentuna, Sweden
- Height: 183 cm (6 ft 0 in)

Sport
- Sport: Table tennis
- Club: Borussia Düsseldorf (Bundesliga)
- Playing style: Right-handed, shakehand grip
- Highest ranking: 12 (7 May 2024)
- Current ranking: 25 (2 November 2026)
Medal record
Men's table tennis
Representing Sweden
Olympic Games
Silver medal – second place	2024 Paris	Team
World Championships
Bronze medal – third place	2018 Halmstad	Team
European Games
Silver medal – second place	2023 Kraków–Małopolska	Team
European Championships
Gold medal – first place	2023 Malmö	Team
Silver medal – second place	2024 Linz	Doubles
Silver medal – second place	2026 Ljubljana	Singles
Silver medal – second place	2026 Ljubljana	Doubles
Bronze medal – third place	2019 Nantes	Team
Bronze medal – third place	2021 Cluj-Napoca	Team
Bronze medal – third place	2022 Munich	Doubles

Anton Sten Anders Källberg (Swedish pronunciation: [ˈǎnːtɔn ˈɕɛ̂lːˌbærj]; born 17 August 1997) is a Swedish professional table tennis player.

== Career ==
=== 2021 ===
Källberg represented his country at the 2020 Summer Olympics in Tokyo. He won his opening round of 64 match in the men's singles event with a convincing 4–0 win over USA's Nikhil Kumar before losing to Lin Yun-ju in the third round.

=== 2022 ===
He won a bronze medal in the men's doubles alongside Jon Persson at the 2022 European Table Tennis Championships.

== Singles titles ==
Year	Tournament	Final opponent	Score	Ref
2019	ITTF Challenge, Croatia Open	(Sweden) Kristian Karlsson	4-1	
2021	WTT Contender Tunis	(Germany) Dang Qiu	4-0	
2023	WTT Contender Tunis	(Germany) Patrick Franziska	4-1	
