= Alexis Lebrun =

French table tennis player (born 2003)

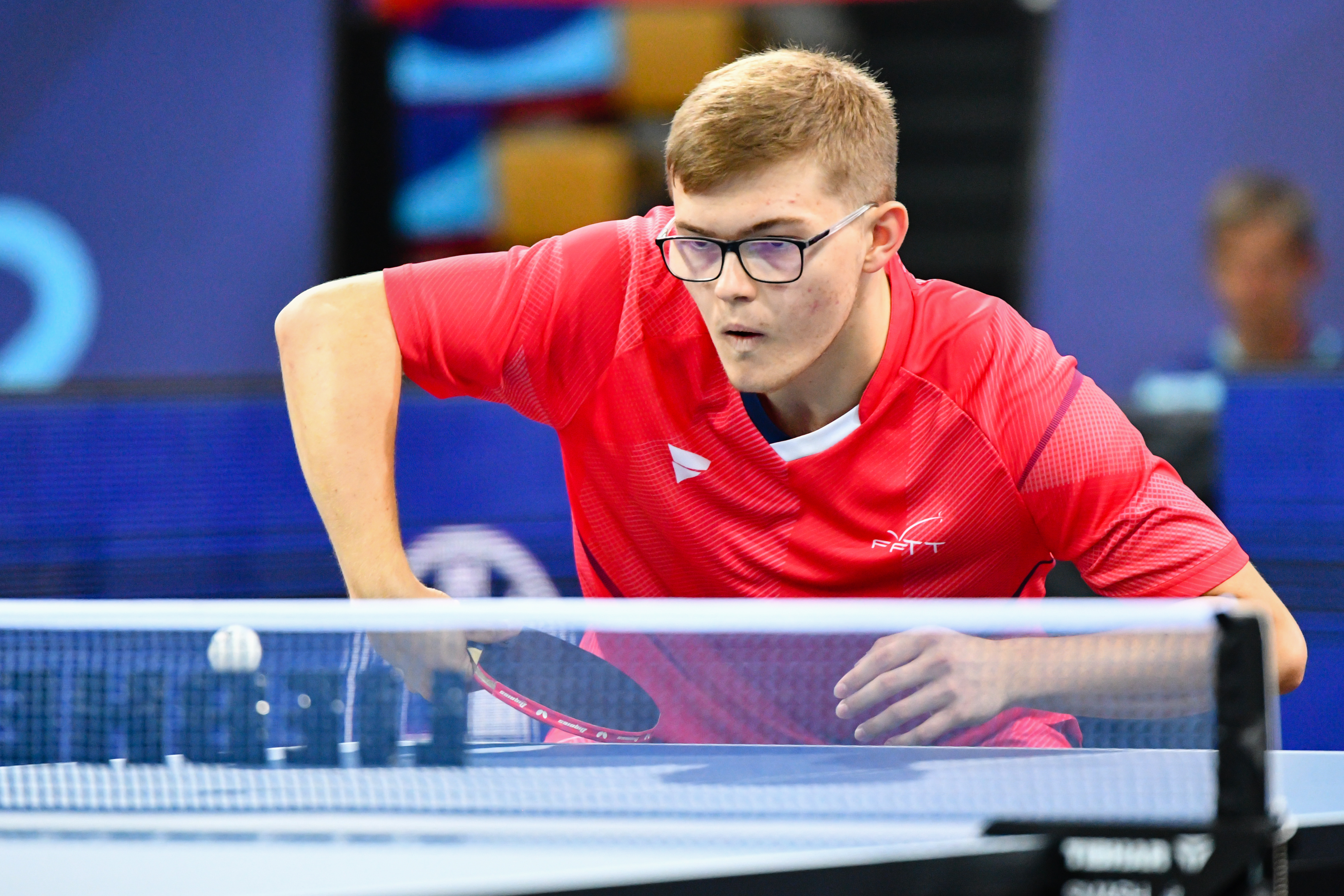
- Lebrun in the 2022 European Championships

Personal information
- Born: 27 August 2003 (age 23) Montpellier, France

Sport
- Sport: Table tennis
- Playing style: Right-handed shakehand
- Equipment: A. Lebrun Krypto Carbon (blade), Hybrid K3 max (rubber)
- Highest ranking: 8 (13 May 2025)
- Current ranking: 8 (5 October 2026)
Medal record
Men's table tennis
Representing France
Olympic Games
Bronze medal – third place	2024 Paris	Team
World Championships
Silver medal – second place	2024 Busan	Team
Bronze medal – third place	2025 Doha	Doubles
Bronze medal – third place	2026 London	Team
European Games
Bronze medal – third place	2023 Kraków–Małopolska	Singles
Bronze medal – third place	2023 Kraków–Małopolska	Team
European Championships
Gold medal – first place	2024 Linz	Singles
Gold medal – first place	2024 Linz	Doubles
Gold medal – first place	2025 Zadar	Team
Gold medal – first place	2026 Ljubljana	Doubles
Silver medal – second place	2026 Ljubljana	Mixed doubles
Bronze medal – third place	2022 Munich	Doubles
Bronze medal – third place	2023 Malmö	Team
Europe Top-16
Gold medal – first place	2025 Montreux	Singles
Gold medal – first place	2026 Montreux	Singles
Bronze medal – third place	2024 Montreux	Singles

Alexis Lebrun (pronounced [a.lɛk.si lə.bʁœ̃]; born 27 August 2003) is a French table tennis player and a three-time French national champion, from years 2022 to 2024. He also became European champion in 2024 and won the Europe Top-16 tournament in 2025, consolidating his status as a top European player. As of 13 May 2025, he is ranked 8th in the world in the ITTF world rankings. Alexis plays also with his brother Félix and after their victory at the WTT Finals in 2024, they became world number one in doubles.

== Life and career ==
=== Early life ===
Alexis Lebrun discovered table tennis when he was three years old. His father Stephane Lebrun was a number 7 table tennis player of France and doubles champion of France. His uncle Christophe Legoût is a former member of French national team, and Alexis' younger brother Félix Lebrun is also a table tennis player.

=== Early career (2020–2022) ===
Alexis Lebrun became the junior national champion of France in singles table tennis in 2020 and repeated his success in 2021. In 2022, he defeated Simon Gauzy to become the national champion of France in the singles. He also won the mixed doubles championship with Camille Lutz.

=== 2023 ===
In March 2023, Alexis Lebrun retained his French national championship title by defeating his younger brother Félix Lebrun in the final.

In April 2023, he won in 5 sets against then number 1 tennis player in the world Fan Zhendong in the quarter-finals of the Macao tournament. Ranked 1050 in the world in January 2022, he quickly advanced in a fifteen-month period to become world number 19 in April 2023 at only nineteen years of age.

In June 2023, at the European Games, Alexis Lebrun won the bronze medal at the men's singles table tennis event. His younger brother Felix won the gold.

=== 2024 ===
In February 2024, as part of the French men's national team, Alexis took part in the 2024 World Team Table Tennis Championships in Busan, South Korea (with Félix Lebrun, Simon Gauzy, Jules Rolland and Lilian Bardet). Team France won the silver medal, having been defeated in the final by Team China (3-0). This was the first time in 27 years that the French men's national team won any medal in the World Team Table Tennis Championships, having won the silver medal in 1997 the last time.

In March 2024, Alexis Lebrun won the French national title a third consecutive time after his previous wins in 2022 and 2023, defeating his brother Félix again in the final, this time in six games.

In October 2024, Alexis Lebrun became Europe's top table tennis player by winning both the singles and the doubles (with Felix Lebrun) table tennis events in the 2024 European Table Tennis Championships.

In November 2024, Alexis and his brother Félix became world number one in doubles after their victory at the WTT Finals in Fukuoka.

=== 2025 ===
In February 2025, Alexis was ranked 10th in the world in the ITTF after he reached the semi-final at the WTT Singapore Smash 2025. In the same month, he won the Europe Top-16 tournament for the first time in his career by defeating triple-winner Darko Jorgić. In March 2025, he was defeated for the first time in the final of the French National Table Tennis Championship by his brother Félix.

== Sponsorship ==
Alexis (as well as his younger brother Felix) was sponsored since his professional debut by the Butterfly brand. In 2022 he finished his collaboration with Butterfly and signed a contract with Tibhar for six years.

== Singles titles ==
Year	Tournament	Final opponent	Score	Ref
2024	WTT Contender Zagreb	(Japan) Shunsuke Togami	4–1	
2024	European Championships	(Germany) Benedikt Duda	4–0	
2025	Europe Top 16	(Slovenia) Darko Jorgić	3–1	

== See also ==
- Félix Lebrun, Alexis' younger brother and high-ranked table tennis player from France
