= Dimitrije Levajac =

Serbian table tennis player

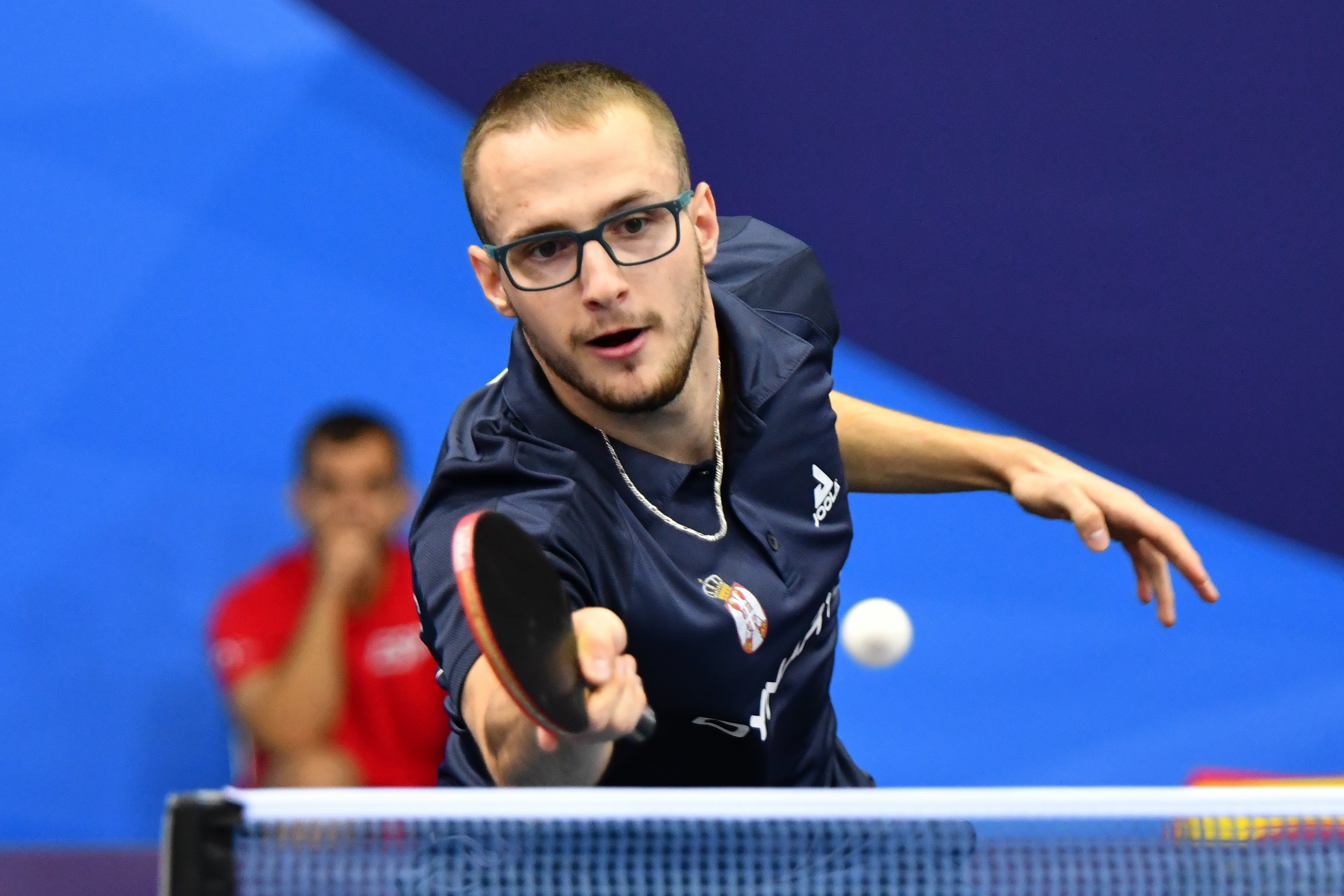

Personal information
- Nationality: Serbia
- Born: 14 August 2001 (age 25) Banja Luka, Bosnia and Herzegovina

Sport
- Sport: Table tennis

Dimitrije Levajac (Serbian Cyrillic: Димитрије Левајац, born 14 August 2001) is a Serbian table tennis player who competed in 2020 Summer Olympics in men's singles and men's team. He was eliminated in singles in first round by Russian table tennis player Kirill Skachkov. He also competes in the Team Tournament.
