= Anders Lind =

Danish table tennis player

Personal information
- Full name: Anders Lind
- Nationality: Denmark
- Born: 14 December 1998 (age 27) Hørsholm, Denmark
- Height: 183 cm (6 ft 0 in)
- Weight: 70 kg (154 lb)

Sport
- Sport: Table tennis
- Club: Borussia Dortmund
- Playing style: Left-handed, shakehand grip, attacking
- Equipment: Anders Lind Hexa Carbon blade; Donic BlueStar and BlueGrip rubbers
- Highest ranking: 14
- Current ranking: 14 (ITTF, week 40, 2026) (28 September 2026)
- Updated on 28 September 2026

Anders Lind (born 14 December 1998) is a Danish table tennis player. A left-handed attacking player using the shakehand grip, he has represented Denmark at the Olympic Games, the World Table Tennis Championships, the European Table Tennis Championships and the European Games. He has won multiple Danish national titles in singles, doubles and mixed doubles, and has also competed professionally in Germany and France.

== Career ==
Lind was born in Hørsholm, Denmark, and began playing table tennis during primary school. His first club was Vedbaek. He made his first international appearances in 2010 and became more prominent internationally from the mid-2010s. In 2017 he competed at both the European Championships and the World Championships; at the latter event he was eliminated in qualification in the singles competition, while Denmark finished 17th in the team event.

In 2018 Lind won the under-21 singles title at the Croatia Open. From 2018 to 2020 he played for TTC Zugbrücke Grenzau in the Table Tennis Bundesliga, having previously played in Germany for 1. FSV Mainz 05. At the 2019 European Games in Minsk, he reached the round of 32 in singles and finished fourth with the Danish men's team, which lost the bronze-medal match to Portugal.

For the 2020–21 season Lind moved to France to play for G. V. Hennebont. On 23 March 2021 he was seriously injured in a car accident, suffering, among other injuries, fractures to two vertebrae. According to reports, a long spinal operation prevented permanent paralysis, but the accident caused him to miss the qualification tournament for the 2020 Summer Olympics in Tokyo. He later returned to competition and won the French championship and the ETTU Cup with Hennebont in the 2022–23 season, alongside players including Chuang Chih-yuan, Kristian Karlsson and Ioannis Sgouropoulos.

Since the 2024–25 season Lind has played in the Table Tennis Bundesliga for Borussia Dortmund. After winning the WTT Feeder Olomouc 2023, he added another WTT Feeder title at WTT Feeder Panagyurishte 2024. He attracted international attention at the China Smash 2024 in Beijing, where he defeated world number one Wang Chuqin and reached the semi-finals.

Lind made his Olympic debut at the 2024 Summer Olympics in Paris. In the men's singles, he defeated Marcos Freitas and Miłosz Redzimski before losing in the round of 16 to Tomokazu Harimoto. In September 2025, at WTT Champions Macao 2025, he defeated another world number one, Lin Shidong, in seven games and reached the semi-finals of a WTT Champions event for the first time, where he lost to Hugo Calderano. He had already won his first WTT singles title at WTT Contender Lagos 2025 earlier that year. In November 2025 he reached another WTT Champions semi-final in Frankfurt after victories over Hwan Bae, Shunsuke Togami and Félix Lebrun. These results helped him qualify for the WTT Finals 2025, where he lost in the first round to Truls Möregårdh.

Lind is married to Belarusian table tennis player Daria Trigolos. He has been described as the first Dane to win Danish national championships in every age category, from mini-cadet to senior level.

== Playing style and equipment ==
Lind is a left-handed attacking player using the shakehand grip. His equipment has included an Anders Lind Hexa Carbon blade with Donic BlueStar and BlueGrip rubbers.

== Selected results ==
Event	Year	Location	Country	Singles	Doubles	Mixed	Team	U21
Olympic Games	2024	Paris	France	Round of 16			Round of 16	
European Table Tennis Championships	2025	Zadar	Croatia				Round of 16	
European Table Tennis Championships	2024	Linz	Austria	Round of 32	Round of 32			
European Table Tennis Championships	2023	Malmö	Sweden				Quarter-finals	
European Table Tennis Championships	2022	Munich	Germany	Round of 64	Round of 32			
European Table Tennis Championships	2021	Cluj-Napoca	Romania				Semi-finals	
European Table Tennis Championships	2018	Alicante	Spain	Round of 32	Round of 64			
European Table Tennis Championships	2017	Luxembourg City	Luxembourg				17th	
European Games	2023	Kraków	Poland	Round of 16			Quarter-finals	
European Games	2019	Minsk	Belarus	Round of 32			4th	
World Table Tennis Championships	2026	London	England				Round of 16	
World Table Tennis Championships	2025	Doha	Qatar	Round of 64	Round of 64			
World Table Tennis Championships	2023	Cairo	Egypt	Quarter-finals	Round of 32			
World Table Tennis Championships	2021	Houston	United States	Round of 128				
World Table Tennis Championships	2019	Budapest	Hungary	Round of 128	Round of 32			
World Table Tennis Championships	2018	Halmstad	Sweden				29th	
World Table Tennis Championships	2017	Düsseldorf	Germany	Qualification				
Table Tennis World Cup	2026	Macau	Macau	17th–32nd				
WTT Feeder	2023	Olomouc	Czech Republic	Winner				
WTT Feeder	2024	Panagyurishte	Bulgaria	Winner				
WTT Feeder	2024	Pristina	Kosovo	Runner-up				
WTT Contender	2026	Lagos	Nigeria	Winner	Round of 16			
WTT Contender	2025	Tunis	Tunisia	Runner-up				
WTT Contender	2025	Lagos	Nigeria	Winner				
WTT Champions	2025	Macau	China	Semi-finals				
WTT Champions	2025	Frankfurt	Germany	Semi-finals				
