= Marcos Freitas =

Portuguese table tennis player

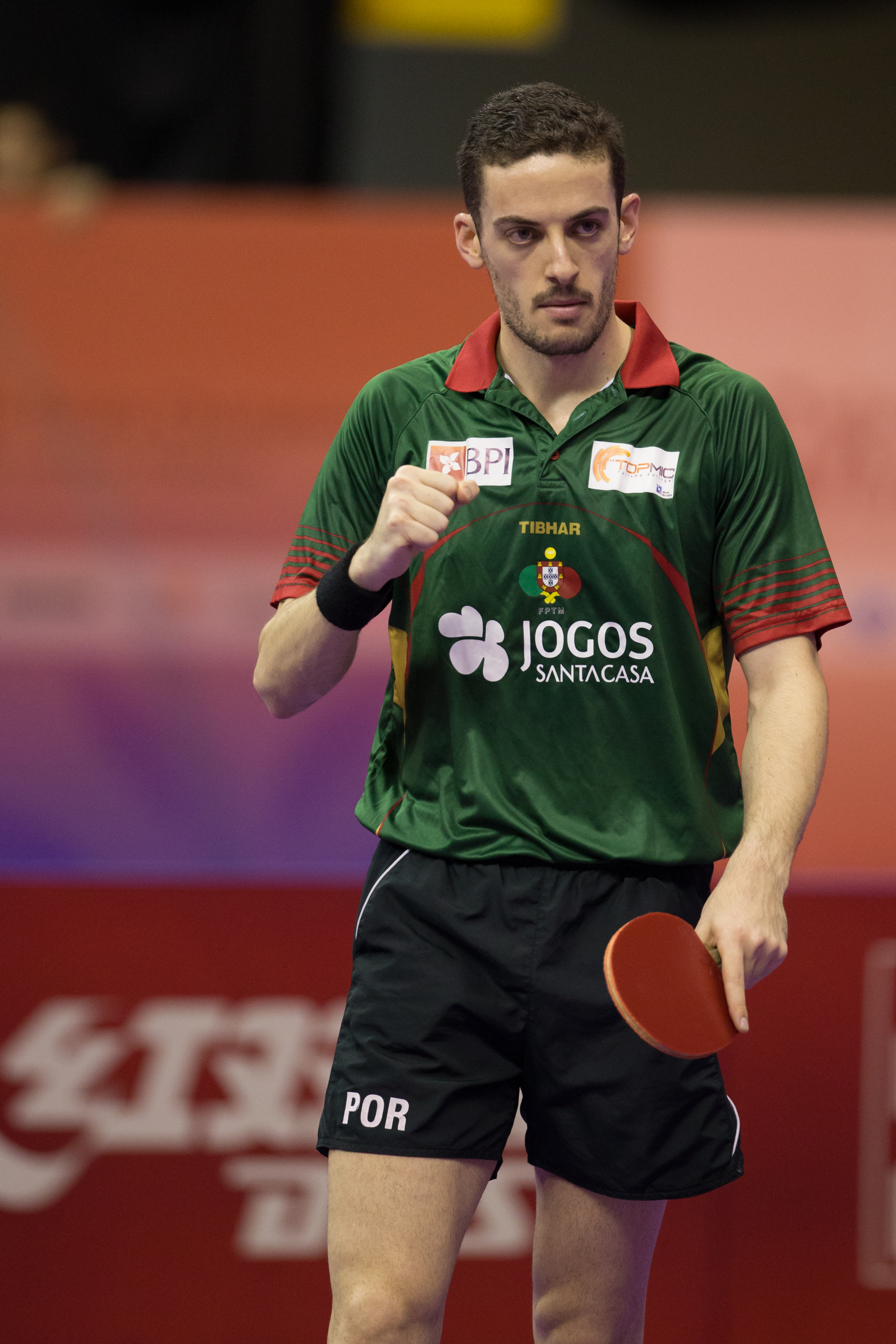
- Freitas in 2016

Personal information
- Full name: Marcos André Sousa da Silva Freitas
- Nickname: The Freight Train
- Born: 8 April 1988 (age 38) Madeira, Portugal
- Height: 1.82 m (6 ft 0 in)
- Weight: 74 kg (163 lb)

Sport
- Sport: Table tennis
- Playing style: Offensive, middle distance
- Highest ranking: 7 (November 2015)
- Current ranking: 72 (28 September 2026)
Medal record
Men's table tennis
Representing Portugal
European Games
Gold medal – first place	2015 Baku	Team
Silver medal – second place	2023 Kraków–Małopolska	Singles
Bronze medal – third place	2019 Minsk	Team
European Championships
Gold medal – first place	2011 Gdansk-Sopot	Doubles
Gold medal – first place	2014 Lisbon	Team
Silver medal – second place	2015 Ekaterinburg	Singles
Silver medal – second place	2017 Luxembourg	Team
Silver medal – second place	2019 Nantes	Team
Bronze medal – third place	2008 Saint-Petersburg	Doubles
Bronze medal – third place	2011 Gdansk-Sopot	Team
Bronze medal – third place	2020 Warsaw	Singles
Bronze medal – third place	2023 Malmö	Team
Europe Top-16
Gold medal – first place	2014 Lausanne	Singles
Silver medal – second place	2015 Baku	Singles
Silver medal – second place	2021 Thessaloniki	Singles
Bronze medal – third place	2024 Montreux	Singles

Marcos André Sousa da Silva Freitas (born 8 April 1988) is a Portuguese table tennis player who won European Championships medals in singles, doubles, and team events. He represented Portugal four times at the Summer Olympics.

== Career ==
Freitas participated at the 2008 Summer Olympics where he got knocked out in the round of 64. In the same year he won the bronze medal in the men's doubles at the European Championship with Tiago Apolónia. Three years later at the 2011 European Championships, he went on to win the gold medal with his doubles partner Andrej Gaćina. He took part on his second Olympics in 2012, reaching the round of 32 in the men's singles and the quarterfinals in the team event with Tiago Apolónia and João Monteiro.

In 2014, Freitas won the Europe Cup title by defeating Michael Maze in the final. He continued to win another title at the ITTF World Tour Czech Open in a seven-game final against Patrick Baum. He also helped the Portuguese men's team win its first European title at the 2014 European Championships, breaking Germany's six-edition winning streak since 2007.

Freitas competed at the inaugural European Games in 2015. He again helped the Portuguese team earn a gold medal in men's team event with João Geraldo and Tiago Apolonia. He won silver in the singles event at the 2015 European Championships in October, and reached his career-high No. 7 spot on the ITTF world ranking in November 2015. As a three-time Olympian, Freitas reached the quarterfinals of the 2016 Olympics in the singles event. Although he won his match in the team event, Portugal lost in the first round of the competition.

After the 2016 Summer Olympics, Freitas and his compatriots continued to make podium appearances at the European Championships and the European Games. In 2021, he advanced to the final of the Europe Top-16 for the third time and participated at the Summer Olympics in both men's singles and men's team competition.

In 2023, He won silver medal in men's singles event at the European Games after losing to Felix Lebrun in the seventh game of the final. He won his first WTT title, a Contender, Lima after defeating Kao Cheng-jui from Taipei, 4-1 in set score.

== Personal life ==
Since 2012, Freitas lives in Schwechat and practices at the Werner Schlager Academy.

== Honors ==
- European Championships: singles runner-up (2015); men's doubles winner (2011); men's team winner (2014)
- Europe Cup winner (2014)
- European Games: singles runner-up (2023); men's team winner (2015)
- European Champions League winner (2014)
- Pro A runner-up (2013)
