= João Geraldo =

Portuguese table tennis player

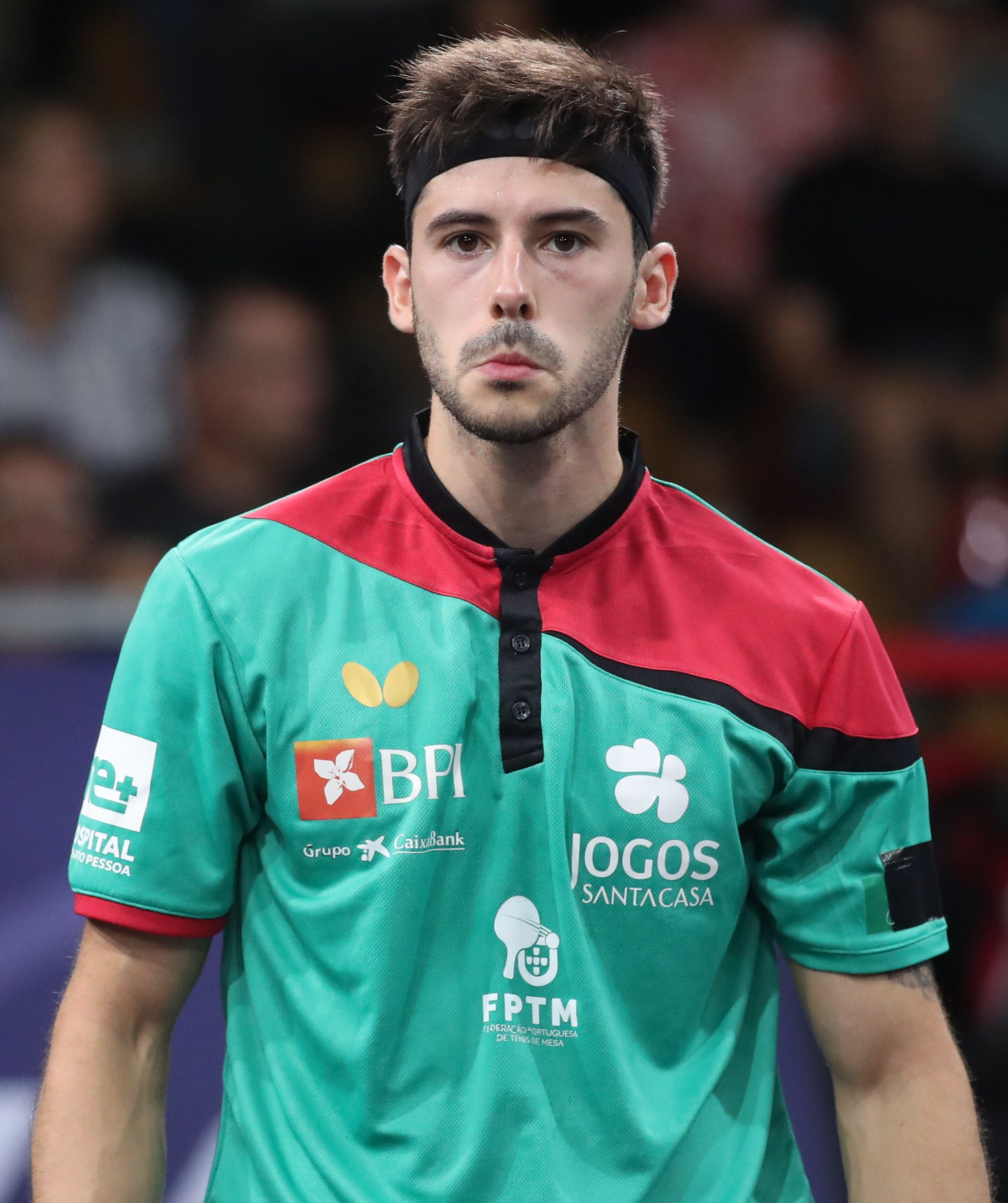

Personal information
- Full name: João Pedro Ferreiro Geraldo
- Born: 29 September 1995 (age 31) Mirandela, Portugal

Sport
- Sport: Table tennis
- Club: TTF Liebherr Ochsenhausen (Germany); Panathinaikos (Greece)
- Highest ranking: 32 (5 October 2026)
- Current ranking: 32 (5 October 2026)
Medal record
Men's table tennis
Representing Portugal
European Games
Gold medal – first place	2015 Baku	Team
European Championships
Gold medal – first place	2014 Lisbon	Team
Silver medal – second place	2017 Luxembourg	Team
Bronze medal – third place	2016 Budapest	Doubles
Bronze medal – third place	2023 Malmö	Team
Mediterranean Games
Silver medal – second place	2022 Oran	Team
Bronze medal – third place	2022 Oran	Singles

João Pedro Ferreiro Geraldo (born 29 September 1995) is a Portuguese table tennis player from Mirandela, who currently plays for German club TTF Liebherr Ochsenhausen and Greek club Panathinaikos. Together with Tiago Apolónia and Marcos Freitas, he won the gold medal in the men's team competition at the 2014 European Table Tennis Championships and at the inaugural European Games with Tiago Apolonia and Marcos Freitas.
