= Europe Smash – Sweden 2026 =

Table tennis tournament in Sweden

Tournament details
- Dates: 8–16 August
- Edition: 2nd
- Total prize money: US$1,550,000
- Venue: Malmö Arena
- Location: Malmö, Sweden

Champions
- Men's singles: (France) Félix Lebrun
- Women's singles: (China) Wang Manyu
- Men's doubles: (France) Alexis Lebrun (France) Félix Lebrun
- Women's doubles: (Japan) Miwa Harimoto (Japan) Hina Hayata
- Mixed doubles: (China) Lin Shidong (China) Kuai Man

The Europe Smash – Sweden 2026 is a table tennis tournament being held at the Malmö Arena in Malmö, Sweden from 8 to 16 August, offering a total prize of US$1,550,000. The tournament features five competition categories: men’s singles, men’s doubles, women’s singles, women’s doubles, and mixed doubles.

In the mixed doubles event, Lin Shidong and Kuai Man emerged as champions, securing their second consecutive Europe Smash title and their fifth Grand Smash title overall. In the women’s doubles event, the Japanese pair Miwa Harimoto and Hina Hayata won their second Grand Smash title in the discipline. In the men’s doubles event, French brothers Félix and Alexis Lebrun claimed their second Grand Smash men’s doubles championship.

In the women's singles event, Wang Manyu won her third Grand Smash title. In the men's, Félix Lebrun also took gold, winning his first Grand Smash title.

== Tournament ==
The Europe Smash – Sweden 2026 is the sixteenth tournament of the 2026 WTT Series and is part of the Grand Smash event. This tournament marks the third Grand Smash event on this season's calendar, with a total of four Grand Smash tournaments being contested throughout the season.

=== Venue ===
This tournament is held at the Malmö Arena in Malmö, Sweden.

=== Point distribution ===
Below is the point distribution table for each phase of the tournament based on the WTT World Ranking for the Grand Smash event.

Event	Winner	Finalist	Semi-finalist	Quarter-finalist	Round of 16	Round of 24 / 32	Round of 64
Singles	2000	1400	900	580	380	100	20
Doubles	2000	1400	900	580	150	10	—

=== Prize pool ===
The total prize money is US$1,550,000 with the distribution of the prize money in accordance with WTT regulations.

Event	Winner	Finalist	Semi-finalist	Quarter-finalist	Round of 16	Round of 24 / 32	Round of 64
Singles	$100,000	$50,000	$25,250	$13,750	$9,000	$6,000	$4,000
Doubles	$10,000	$6,034	$3,600	$2,650	$2,000	$1,500	—

=== Notable absences ===
Notable absences were the 1st ranked players Wang Chuqin and Sun Yingsha. Sun Yingsha were inittially announced that would participate but withdrew on August 2 due to injury.

== Schedule ==
The tournament lasts over 9 days.

#Q	Qualification rounds	#R	Preliminary rounds	QF	Quarter-finals	SF	Semi-finals	F	Finals

Date	8 Aug	9 Aug		10 Aug	11 Aug	12 Aug	13 Aug	14 Aug		15 Aug	16 Aug	
Event	8 Aug	9 Aug		10 Aug	11 Aug	12 Aug	13 Aug	14 Aug		15 Aug	16 Aug	
Men's singles	1Q	2Q	3Q	1R			2R	3R		QF	SF	F
Women's singles	1Q	2Q	3Q	1R			2R	3R		QF	SF	F
Men's doubles				1R		2R	QF	SF		F		
Women's doubles				1R		2R	QF	SF		F		
Mixed doubles				1R		2R	QF	SF	F			

== Qualification ==
=== Men's singles ===
The following players qualified for the main draw:

- (Belgium) Cédric Nuytinck
- (Romania) Iulian Chirita
- (Singapore) Izaac Quek
- (Poland) Maciej Kubik
- (Spain) Álvaro Robles
- (Slovenia) Deni Kožul
- (Hungary) Csaba András
- (Poland) Miłosz Redzimski

=== Women's singles ===
The following players qualified for the main draw:

- (Hong Kong) Su Tsz Tung
- (Chinese Taipei) Peng Yu-han
- (Chinese Taipei) Chien Tung-chuan
- (Romania) Elena Zaharia
- (Monaco) Xiaoxin Yang
- (South Korea) Yoo Ye-rin
- (Italy) Giorgia Piccolin
- (India) Diya Chitale

== Men's singles ==
=== Seeds ===
1. (Sweden) Truls Möregårdh (first round)
2. (Japan) Sora Matsushima (semi-finals)
3. (France) Félix Lebrun (champion)
4. (Japan) Tomokazu Harimoto (final)
5. (China) Lin Shidong (third round)
6. (Chinese Taipei) Lin Yun-ju (second round)
7. (Brazil) Hugo Calderano (quarter-finals)
8. (South Korea) Jang Woo-jin (second round)
9. (France) Alexis Lebrun (quarter-finals)
10. (Germany) Dang Qiu (first round)
11. (China) Wen Ruibo (second round)
12. (Denmark) Anders Lind (third round)
13. (Japan) Shunsuke Togami (third round)
14. (Slovenia) Darko Jorgić (semi-finals)
15. (Russia) Vladimir Sidorenko (first round)
16. (Germany) Patrick Franziska (first round)

=== Finals ===
Quarter-finals
14	(Slovenia) Darko Jorgić	12	11	11	10	8	11
(Egypt) Omar Assar	10	9	7	12	11	4
3	(France) Félix Lebrun	16	11	8	11	11
7	(Brazil) Hugo Calderano	14	7	11	4	5
9	(France) Alexis Lebrun	9	7	11	13
4	(Japan) Tomokazu Harimoto	11	11	13	15
WC	(Sweden) Elias Ranefur	9	11	9	11	10	11	9
2	(Japan) Sora Matsushima	11	8	11	8	12	9	11

Semi-finals
14	(Slovenia) Darko Jorgić	5	5	8	5
3	(France) Félix Lebrun	11	11	11	11
4	(Japan) Tomokazu Harimoto	11	7	11	6	9	11	11
2	(Japan) Sora Matsushima	6	11	4	11	11	8	6

Final
3	(France) Félix Lebrun	11	11	5	11	11
4	(Japan) Tomokazu Harimoto	5	8	11	9	9

=== Top half ===
==== Section 1 ====
First round
1	(Sweden) T Möregårdh	9	3	8
(Germany) D Ovtcharov	11	11	11
Q	(Poland) M Redzimski	7	9	11	11	11
(South Korea) Oh J-s	11	11	6	7	13
(Australia) N Lum	9	12	9
Q	(Belgium) C Nuytinck	11	14	11
Q	(Slovenia) D Kožul	9	3	11	8
14	(Slovenia) D Jorgić	11	11	5	11
10	(Germany) D Qiu	5	7	2
Q	(Hungary) C András	11	11	11
(Egypt) O Assar	11	15	6	7	11
(China) Chen JS	9	13	11	11	7
(Denmark) J Groth	11	7	7	11	12
WC	(Sweden) M Karlsson	8	11	11	8	10
(Czech Republic) L Jančařík	11	6	5	3
6	(Chinese Taipei) Lin Y-j	7	11	11	11

Second round
(Germany) D Ovtcharov	11	11	11
(South Korea) Oh J-s	5	7	6
Q	(Belgium) C Nuytinck	9	8	11
14	(Slovenia) D Jorgić	11	11	13
Q	(Hungary) C András	11	8	5
(Egypt) O Assar	13	11	11
(Denmark) J Groth	11	5	11	2	11
6	(Chinese Taipei) Lin Y-j	8	11	4	11	9

Third round
(Germany) D Ovtcharov	7	11	6	10
14	(Slovenia) D Jorgić	11	8	11	12
(Egypt) O Assar	13	11	5	9	11
(Denmark) J Groth	11	9	11	11	9

Quarter-finals
14	(Slovenia) D Jorgić	12	11	11	10	8	11
(Egypt) O Assar	10	9	7	12	11	4

==== Section 2 ====
First round
3	(France) F Lebrun	11	11	8	11
(Romania) E Ionescu	4	5	11	4
(France) F Coton	7	9	9
(South Korea) Park G-h	11	11	11
(Australia) F Luu	9	7	8
(Portugal) J Geraldo	11	11	11
(France) T Poret	8	2	11	11	11
16	(Germany) P Franziska	11	11	8	5	9
12	(Denmark) A Lind	12	8	11	11
Q	(Poland) M Kubik	10	11	5	8
(Chinese Taipei) Kuo G-h	11	11	7	11
(Germany) B Duda	8	7	11	4
(Japan) M Yoshimura	11	11	12	11
(Kazakhstan) K Gerassimenko	5	4	14	7
WC	(Sweden) W Bergenblock	1	7	6
7	(Brazil) H Calderano	11	11	11

Second round
3	(France) F Lebrun	11	11	11
(South Korea) Park G-h	9	8	5
(Portugal) J Geraldo	14	8	9	5
(France) T Poret	12	11	11	11
12	(Denmark) A Lind	11	11	4	6	11
(Chinese Taipei) Kuo G-h	7	6	11	11	9
(Japan) M Yoshimura	2	11	11	7
7	(Brazil) H Calderano	11	9	13	11

Third round
3	(France) F Lebrun	11	11	11
(France) T Poret	2	4	4
12	(Denmark) A Lind	7	9	11	8
7	(Brazil) H Calderano	11	11	5	11

Quarter-finals
3	(France) F Lebrun	16	11	8	11	11
7	(Brazil) H Calderano	14	7	11	4	5

=== Bottom half ===
==== Section 3 ====
First round
5	(China) Lin SD	11	7	11	11
(China) Chen YY	9	11	4	6
(United States) K Jha	11	11	12
WC	(Kazakhstan) Fang B	8	9	10
(South Korea) Lim J-h	12	6	7	11
(China) Xiang P	10	11	11	13
Q	(Singapore) I Quek	10	8	4
9	(France) A Lebrun	12	11	11
13	(Japan) S Togami	15	11	11
(Hong Kong) Wong C T	13	3	7
WC	(Sweden) K Karlsson	11	11	8	13
(Japan) H Shinozuka	6	9	11	11
(Japan) Y Uda	12	11	12	11
(France) S Gauzy	10	5	14	6
(India) M Thakkar	9	8	6
4	(Japan) T Harimoto	11	11	11

Second round
5	(China) Lin SD	11	11	12
(United States) K Jha	7	3	10
(China) Xiang P	4	9	11	8
9	(France) A Lebrun	11	11	7	11
13	(Japan) S Togami	11	11	11
WC	(Sweden) K Karlsson	9	6	6
(Japan) Y Uda	5	9	5
4	(Japan) T Harimoto	11	11	11

Third round
5	(China) Lin SD	11	7	11	7	8
9	(France) A Lebrun	6	11	9	11	11
13	(Japan) S Togami	12	11	10	11	9
4	(Japan) T Harimoto	14	7	12	9	11

Quarter-finals
9	(France) A Lebrun	9	7	11	13
4	(Japan) T Harimoto	11	11	13	15

==== Section 4 ====
First round
8	(South Korea) Jang W-j	14	11	9	11
WC	(Belgium) A Rassenfosse	12	9	11	8
Q	(Spain) Á Robles	6	12	9	11	4
(Croatia) T Pucar	11	10	11	8	11
WC	(Sweden) E Ranefur	11	14	11
Q	(Romania) I Chirita	3	12	8
(France) L Bardet	5	6	11	4
11	(China) Wen RB	11	11	2	11
15	(Russia) V Sidorenko	5	9	7
(Sweden) A Källberg	11	11	11
(South Korea) An J-h	12	6	7	7
(China) Zhou QH	10	11	11	11
(India) M Shah	11	7	6	11	8
(Chinese Taipei) Feng Y-h	3	11	11	5	11
(India) S Gnanasekaran	6	11	6	5
2	(Japan) S Matsushima	11	8	11	11

Second round
8	(South Korea) Jang W-j	8	8	6
(Croatia) T Pucar	11	11	11
WC	(Sweden) E Ranefur	11	5	11	5	11
11	(China) Wen RB	7	11	6	11	7
(Sweden) A Källberg	12	11	9	11	9
(China) Zhou QH	14	5	11	8	11
(Chinese Taipei) Feng Y-h	11	11	4	11	6
2	(Japan) S Matsushima	13	5	11	2	11

Third round
(Croatia) T Pucar	7	11	7	11	8
WC	(Sweden) E Ranefur	11	5	11	9	11
(China) Zhou QH	11	9	7	11	9
2	(Japan) S Matsushima	5	11	11	6	11

Quarter-finals
WC	(Sweden) E Ranefur	9	11	9	11	10	11	9
2	(Japan) S Matsushima	11	8	11	8	12	9	11

== Women's singles ==
=== Seeds ===
1. (China) Wang Manyu (champion)
2. (Japan) Miwa Harimoto (semi-finals)
3. (China) Kuai Man (semi-finals)
4. (China) Chen Xingtong (second round)
5. (China) Wang Yidi (final)
6. (Japan) Hina Hayata (quarter-finals)
7. (Germany) Sabine Winter (second round)
8. (Macau) Zhu Yuling (first round)
9. (South Korea) Shin Yu-bin (third round)
10. (Japan) Satsuki Odo (third round)
11. (China) Chen Yi (quarter-finals)
12. (Japan) Honoka Hashimoto (second round)
13. (China) Shi Xunyao (quarter-finals)
14. (South Korea) Joo Cheon-hui (second round)
15. (Japan) Mima Ito (first round)
16. (Germany) Ying Han (third round)

=== Finals ===
Quarter-finals
1	(China) Wang Manyu	12	11	11	15	11
Q	(Chinese Taipei) Peng Yu-han	14	4	6	13	6
3	(China) Kuai Man	7	11	11	11	3	10	11
6	(Japan) Hina Hayata	11	5	3	6	11	12	8
5	(China) Wang Yidi	11	11	11	11
13	(China) Shi Xunyao	5	9	7	9
11	(China) Chen Yi	1	6	10	7
2	(Japan) Miwa Harimoto	11	11	12	11

Semi-finals
1	(China) Wang Manyu	11	11	11	11
3	(China) Kuai Man	7	4	7	8
5	(China) Wang Yidi	11	11	7	11	9	13
2	(Japan) Miwa Harimoto	7	3	11	9	11	11

Final
1	(China) Wang Manyu	12	11	9	12	10	11
5	(China) Wang Yidi	10	3	11	10	12	5

=== Top half ===
==== Section 1 ====
First round
1	(China) Wang MY	11	11	11
(Egypt) D Meshref	4	4	4
Q	(Chinese Taipei) Chien T-c	11	11	11
(Portugal) F Yu	7	6	5
(Chinese Taipei) Li Y-j	16	6	10	11	11
Q	(South Korea) Yoo Y-r	14	11	12	4	4
(China) Qin YX	7	11	14	4	11
15	(Japan) M Ito	11	3	12	11	9
12	(Japan) H Hashimoto	11	11	11
(Chinese Taipei) Yeh Y-t	7	7	8
(France) P Pavade	8	12	11	9	14
Q	(Chinese Taipei) Peng Y-h	11	10	4	11	16
(Russia) E Abraamian	11	4	8	11
(Japan) M Nagasaki	9	11	11	13
(Brazil) B Takahashi	11	9	10	11	5
7	(Germany) S Winter	6	11	12	7	11

Second round
1	(China) Wang MY	11	11	11
Q	(Chinese Taipei) Chien T-c	5	3	8
(Chinese Taipei) Li Y-j	11	4	7	11	4
(China) Qin YX	9	11	11	8	11
12	(Japan) H Hashimoto	9	5	11	9
Q	(Chinese Taipei) Peng Y-h	11	11	8	11
(Japan) M Nagasaki	11	11	11
7	(Germany) S Winter	7	7	3

Third round
1	(China) Wang MY	11	14	11
(China) Qin YX	7	12	9
Q	(Chinese Taipei) Peng Y-h	9	11	11	11
(Japan) M Nagasaki	11	8	9	6

Quarter-finals
1	(China) Wang MY	12	11	11	15	11
Q	(Chinese Taipei) Peng Y-h	14	4	6	13	6

==== Section 2 ====
First round
3	(China) Kuai M	11	15	8	11
Q	(Romania) E Zaharia	6	13	11	5
(Austria) S Polcanova	9	11	17	11
(South Korea) Lee E-h	11	9	15	3
(Germany) N Mittelham	12	11	11
(Romania) B Szőcs	10	5	8
(Puerto Rico) A Díaz	5	3	11	5
14	(South Korea) Joo C-h	11	11	9	11
9	(South Korea) Shin Y-b	11	11	11
WC	(Sweden) N Baasan	7	7	8
Q	(Italy) G Piccolin	15	11	8	1	11
WC	(France) C Lutz	13	4	11	11	7
Q	(Hong Kong) Su T T	11	13	11
(Spain) M Xiao	8	11	0
(France) J N Yuan	9	5	12
6	(Japan) H Hayata	11	11	14

Second round
3	(China) Kuai M	11	13	11	11
(Austria) S Polcanova	6	15	8	9
(Germany) N Mittelham	11	11	6	11
14	(South Korea) Joo C-h	7	9	11	5
9	(South Korea) Shin Y-b	11	11	11
Q	(Italy) G Piccolin	9	8	4
Q	(Hong Kong) Su T T	8	9	12	9
6	(Japan) H Hayata	11	11	10	11

Third round
3	(China) Kuai M	11	13	11
(Germany) N Mittelham	5	11	5
9	(South Korea) Shin Y-b	11	6	9	11	10
6	(Japan) H Hayata	6	11	11	6	12

Quarter-finals
3	(China) Kuai M	7	11	11	11	3	10	11
6	(Japan) H Hayata	11	5	3	6	11	12	8

=== Bottom half ===
==== Section 3 ====
First round
5	(China) Wang YD	11	11	11
WC	(Sweden) S Benjegard	6	1	4
Q	(India) D Chitale	11	11	11
(India) S Akula	8	6	9
(United States) L Zhang	14	11	11
(India) M Batra	12	7	6
WC	(Sweden) F Bergand	5	11	4	7
10	(Japan) S Odo	11	7	11	11
13	(China) Shi XY	11	11	11
(Canada) M Zhang	5	5	8
(Chinese Taipei) Cheng I-c	4	11	11	7	11
(Australia) Y Liu	11	1	6	11	8
(Hong Kong) Doo H K	9	11	1	9
WC	(Japan) M Kihara	11	9	11	11
(Egypt) H Goda	11	4	8	13	4
4	(China) Chen XT	8	11	11	11	11

Second round
5	(China) Wang YD	11	11	11
Q	(India) D Chitale	8	4	5
(United States) L Zhang	8	5	10
10	(Japan) S Odo	11	11	12
13	(China) Shi XY	11	11	5	8	11
(Chinese Taipei) Cheng I-c	6	7	11	11	2
WC	(Japan) M Kihara	10	12	10	11	11
4	(China) Chen XT	12	10	12	3	7

Third round
5	(China) Wang YD	5	12	11	11
10	(Japan) S Odo	11	10	6	6
13	(China) Shi XY	11	6	11	11
WC	(Japan) M Kihara	6	11	4	4

Quarter-finals
5	(China) Wang YD	11	11	11	11
13	(China) Shi XY	5	9	7	9

==== Section 4 ====
First round
8	(Macau) Zhu YL	11	6	9	14	7
WC	(Germany) A Kaufmann	4	11	11	12	11
(Romania) A Dragoman	11	11	8	8	12
(Romania) E Samara	4	5	11	11	14
WC	(Sweden) C Källberg	11	8	12	11
(Ukraine) M Pesotska	9	11	10	7
(Australia) M Jee	4	3	8
11	(China) Chen Y	11	11	11
16	(Germany) Y Han	10	11	11	11
(Poland) N Bajor	12	3	3	8
(Singapore) Zeng J	6	7	11	11	11
Q	(Monaco) X Yang	11	11	4	3	6
(South Korea) Kim N-y	11	13	11
(United States) A Wang	8	11	8
(Wales) A Hursey	11	6	5	11
2	(Japan) M Harimoto	5	11	11	13

Second round
WC	(Germany) A Kaufmann	11	11	7	11
(Romania) E Samara	6	7	11	7
WC	(Sweden) C Källberg	13	5	6	3
11	(China) Chen Y	11	11	11	11
16	(Germany) Y Han	11	11	9	11
(Singapore) Zeng J	5	4	11	6
(South Korea) Kim N-y	6	7	5
2	(Japan) M Harimoto	11	11	11

Third round
WC	(Germany) A Kaufmann	14	10	11	1
11	(China) Chen Y	16	12	9	11
16	(Germany) Y Han	4	9	10
2	(Japan) M Harimoto	11	11	12

Quarter-finals
11	(China) Chen Y	1	6	10	7
2	(Japan) M Harimoto	11	11	12	11

== Men's doubles ==
=== Seeds ===
1. (China) Lin Shidong / (China) Wen Ruibo (quarter-finals)
2. (Hong Kong) Wong Chun Ting / (Hong Kong) Baldwin Chan (final)
3. (India) Manav Thakkar / (India) Manush Shah (quarter-finals)
4. (South Korea) Oh Jun-sung / (South Korea) Lim Jong-hoon (quarter-finals)
5. (France) Alexis Lebrun / (France) Félix Lebrun (champions)
6. (France) Esteban Dorr / (France) Florian Bourrassaud (second round)
7. (Germany) Benedikt Duda / (Germany) Dang Qiu (quarter-finals)
8. (Belgium) Martin Allegro / (Belgium) Adrien Rassenfosse (semi-finals)

=== Finals ===
Semi-finals
5	(France) Alexis Lebrun (France) Félix Lebrun	11	7	11	11
8	(Belgium) Martin Allegro (Belgium) Adrien Rassenfosse	8	11	8	2
WC	(Japan) Shunsuke Togami (Japan) Hiroto Shinozuka	4	11	11	8	8
2	(Hong Kong) Wong Chun Ting (Hong Kong) Baldwin Chan	11	7	7	11	11

Final
5	(France) Alexis Lebrun (France) Félix Lebrun	11	11	14
2	(Hong Kong) Wong Chun Ting (Hong Kong) Baldwin Chan	7	8	12

=== Top half ===
==== Section 1 ====
First round
(Sweden) K Karlsson (Sweden) A Källberg	9	11	7	11	11
(Slovenia) D Jorgić (Slovenia) D Kožul	11	7	11	8	9
(Croatia) A Gaćina (Croatia) I Ban	4	11	10	7
(Egypt) Y Abdelaziz (Egypt) M Elbeiali	11	9	12	11

Second round
1	(China) Lin SD (China) Wen RB	7	11	11	8	11
(Sweden) K Karlsson (Sweden) A Källberg	11	7	6	11	7
(Egypt) Y Abdelaziz (Egypt) M Elbeiali	4	4	4
5	(France) A Lebrun (France) F Lebrun	11	11	11

Quarter-finals
1	(China) Lin SD (China) Wen RB	9	7	6
5	(France) A Lebrun (France) F Lebrun	11	11	11

==== Section 2 ====
First round
(Spain) D Berzosa (Spain) J Pérez	11	11	11
WC	(Sweden) E Ranefur (Sweden) M Karlsson	9	6	8
WC	(Sweden) N Dahlström (United States) B Botha	11	13	5	11	4
(United States) S Naresh (United States) N Naresh	9	15	11	9	11

Second round
3	(India) M Thakkar (India) M Shah	5	6	11	11	11
(Spain) D Berzosa (Spain) J Pérez	11	11	4	8	3
(United States) S Naresh (United States) N Naresh	10	3	9
8	(Belgium) M Allegro (Belgium) A Rassenfosse	12	11	11

Quarter-finals
3	(India) M Thakkar (India) M Shah	11	6	11	9	13
8	(Belgium) M Allegro (Belgium) A Rassenfosse	5	11	6	11	15

=== Bottom half ===
==== Section 3 ====
First round
(Portugal) T Apolónia (Portugal) M Freitas	12	10	11	8	11
WC	(Japan) S Togami (Japan) H Shinozuka	10	12	9	11	13
(Romania) E Ionescu (Romania) D Movileanu	11	13	11	12
(England) T Jarvis (England) C Green	5	15	7	10

Second round
6/WC	(France) E Dorr (France) F Bourrassaud	11	3	7
WC	(Japan) S Togami (Japan) H Shinozuka	13	11	11
(Romania) E Ionescu (Romania) D Movileanu	6	9	6
4	(South Korea) Oh J-s (South Korea) Lim J-h	11	11	11

Quarter-finals
WC	(Japan) S Togami (Japan) H Shinozuka	10	12	11	7	12
4	(South Korea) Oh J-s (South Korea) Lim J-h	12	10	6	11	10

==== Section 4 ====
First round
(Poland) M Kubik (Poland) M Redzimski	11	11	9	11
(Slovakia) J Zelinka (Slovakia) Ľ Pištej	2	6	11	2
(Chinese Taipei) Kuo G-h (Chinese Taipei) Feng Y-h	11	11	9	8
(Brazil) G Teodoro (Brazil) L Iizuka	13	7	11	11

Second round
7	(Germany) B Duda (Germany) D Qiu	9	11	11	11
(Poland) M Kubik (Poland) M Redzimski	11	4	8	6
(Brazil) G Teodoro (Brazil) L Iizuka	5	11	7	6
2	(Hong Kong) Wong C T (Hong Kong) B Chan	11	7	11	11

Quarter-finals
7	(Germany) B Duda (Germany) D Qiu	13	6	11	5	9
2	(Hong Kong) Wong C T (Hong Kong) B Chan	11	11	3	11	11

== Women's doubles ==
=== Seeds ===
1. (Japan) Miwa Harimoto / (Japan) Hina Hayata (champions)
2. (China) Wang Manyu / (China) Kuai Man (quarter-finals)
3. (South Korea) Shin Yu-bin / (South Korea) Joo Cheon-hui (semi-finals)
4. (Japan) Miyu Nagasaki / (South Korea) Kim Na-yeong (semi-finals)
5. (India) Diya Chitale / (India) Yashaswini Ghorpade (second round)
6. (Hong Kong) Doo Hoi Kem / (Hong Kong) Ng Wing Lam (final)
7. (China) Wang Yidi / (China) Chen Yi (quarter-finals)
8. (Spain) María Xiao / (Wales) Anna Hursey (second round)

=== Finals ===
Semi-finals
1	(Japan) Miwa Harimoto (Japan) Hina Hayata	11	11	11
4	(Japan) Miyu Nagasaki (South Korea) Kim Na-yeong	6	6	9
3	(South Korea) Shin Yu-bin (South Korea) Joo Cheon-hui	9	11	13	6	12
6	(Hong Kong) Doo Hoi Kem (Hong Kong) Ng Wing Lam	11	5	11	11	14

Final
1	(Japan) Miwa Harimoto (Japan) Hina Hayata	11	9	13	11
6	(Hong Kong) Doo Hoi Kem (Hong Kong) Ng Wing Lam	6	11	11	9

=== Top half ===
==== Section 1 ====
First round
(Puerto Rico) A Díaz (Japan) H Hashimoto	14	11	11
(Singapore) C Lai (Germany) X Shan	12	6	6
(Chinese Taipei) Chien T-c (Chinese Taipei) Li Y-j	11	11	7	11
WC	(Sweden) C Källberg (Sweden) F Bergand	9	8	11	7

Second round
1	(Japan) M Harimoto (Japan) H Hayata	11	11	11
(Puerto Rico) A Díaz (Japan) H Hashimoto	6	4	4
(Chinese Taipei) Chien T-c (Chinese Taipei) Li Y-j	7	9	11	15	9
7/WC	(China) Wang YD (China) Chen Y	11	11	6	13	11

Quarter-finals
1	(Japan) M Harimoto (Japan) H Hayata	11	11	9	11
7/WC	(China) Wang YD (China) Chen Y	4	3	11	9

==== Section 2 ====
First round
(Thailand) O Paranang (Poland) N Bajor	10	2	11	10
(Singapore) Loy M Y (Singapore) Ser L Q	12	11	5	12
(Romania) E Samara (Romania) B Szőcs	11	12	9	11
(France) P Pavade (France) C Lutz	8	10	11	8

Second round
4	(Japan) M Nagasaki (South Korea) Kim N-y	11	12	11
(Singapore) Loy M Y (Singapore) Ser L Q	5	10	5
(Romania) E Samara (Romania) B Szőcs	6	11	11	11
8	(Spain) M Xiao (Wales) A Hursey	11	8	8	9

Quarter-finals
4	(Japan) M Nagasaki (South Korea) Kim N-y	11	11	11
(Romania) E Samara (Romania) B Szőcs	4	8	6

=== Bottom half ===
==== Section 3 ====
First round
(Serbia) I Lupulesku (Serbia) S Šurjan	6	11	6	7
(Germany) A Kaufmann (Germany) S Winter	11	6	11	11
(Egypt) D Meshref (Egypt) H Goda	14	4	11	9	11
(Germany) N Mittelham (Australia) Y Liu	12	11	7	11	8

Second round
5	(India) D Chitale (India) Y Ghorpade	12	6	11	9	4
(Germany) A Kaufmann (Germany) S Winter	10	11	8	11	11
(Egypt) D Meshref (Egypt) H Goda	11	4	6	5
3	(South Korea) Shin Y-b (South Korea) Joo C-h	9	11	11	11

Quarter-finals
(Germany) A Kaufmann (Germany) S Winter	9	11	3	10
3	(South Korea) Shin Y-b (South Korea) Joo C-h	11	8	11	12

==== Section 4 ====
First round
WC	(Sweden) N Baasan (Sweden) A Svensson	5	11	11	7	11
WC	(Sweden) S Benjegard (Sweden) A Nilsson	11	4	9	11	9
(Slovakia) T Kukuľková (India) S Das	11	8	11	11
(Chile) D Ortega (Chile) P Vega	4	11	9	1

Second round
6	(Hong Kong) Doo H K (Hong Kong) Ng W L	11	11	11
WC	(Sweden) N Baasan (Sweden) A Svensson	6	5	6
(Slovakia) T Kukuľková (India) S Das	7	7	6
2	(China) Wang MY (China) Kuai M	11	11	11

Quarter-finals
6	(Hong Kong) Doo H K (Hong Kong) Ng W L	11	11	4	10	11
2	(China) Wang MY (China) Kuai M	4	9	11	12	5

== Mixed doubles ==
=== Seeds ===
1. (South Korea) Lim Jong-hoon / (South Korea) Shin Yu-bin (quarter-finals)
2. (Brazil) Hugo Calderano / (Brazil) Bruna Takahashi (second round)
3. (China) Lin Shidong / (China) Kuai Man (champions)
4. (Hong Kong) Wong Chun Ting / (Hong Kong) Doo Hoi Kem (final)
5. (India) Manush Shah / (India) Diya Chitale (second round)
6. (Spain) Álvaro Robles / (Spain) María Xiao (semi-finals)
7. (Germany) Dang Qiu / (Germany) Sabine Winter (quarter-finals)
8. (Chinese Taipei) Lin Yun-ju / (Chinese Taipei) Cheng I-ching (semi-finals)

=== Finals ===
Semi-finals
8	(Chinese Taipei) Lin Yun-ju (Chinese Taipei) Cheng I-ching	5	5	9
3	(China) Lin Shidong (China) Kuai Man	11	11	11
4	(Hong Kong) Wong Chun Ting (Hong Kong) Doo Hoi Kem	12	12	11
6	(Spain) Álvaro Robles (Spain) María Xiao	10	10	6

Final
3	(China) Lin Shidong (China) Kuai Man	4	11	11	11
4	(Hong Kong) Wong Chun Ting (Hong Kong) Doo Hoi Kem	11	6	3	6

=== Top half ===
==== Section 1 ====
First round
(Denmark) A Lind (Wales) A Hursey	11	15	8	11
(Sweden) K Karlsson (Sweden) C Källberg	9	13	11	7
(Brazil) G Teodoro (Chile) P Vega	9	7	9
(United States) J Liang (United States) S Moyland	11	11	11

Second round
1	(South Korea) Lim J-h (South Korea) Shin Y-b	11	11	11
(Denmark) A Lind (Wales) A Hursey	6	9	5
(United States) J Liang (United States) S Moyland	1	1	8
8	(Chinese Taipei) Lin Y-j (Chinese Taipei) Cheng I-c	11	11	11

Quarter-finals
1	(South Korea) Lim J-h (South Korea) Shin Y-b	3	2	11	9
8	(Chinese Taipei) Lin Y-j (Chinese Taipei) Cheng I-c	11	11	4	11

==== Section 2 ====
First round
WC	(Sweden) E Ranefur (Sweden) F Bergand	9	9	11	9
WC	(Romania) E Ionescu (Romania) B Szőcs	11	11	8	11
(France) A Lebrun (Japan) S Odo	3	11	11	10	11
(Croatia) I Ban (Croatia) H Arapović	11	7	4	12	5

Second round
3	(China) Lin SD (China) Kuai M	11	12	9	11
WC	(Romania) E Ionescu (Romania) B Szőcs	6	10	11	3
(France) A Lebrun (Japan) S Odo	12	11	11	11
5	(India) M Shah (India) D Chitale	14	9	9	9

Quarter-finals
3	(China) Lin SD (China) Kuai M	11	11	12
(France) A Lebrun (Japan) S Odo	4	9	10

=== Bottom half ===
==== Section 3 ====
First round
(Germany) P Franziska (Puerto Rico) A Díaz	9	11	6	11	11
(England) C Green (England) T-T Ho	11	6	11	2	9
(Slovakia) Ľ Pištej (Slovakia) T Kukuľková	11	11	11
(Egypt) Y Abdelaziz (Egypt) M Alhodaby	6	4	9

Second round
7	(Germany) D Qiu (Germany) S Winter	9	11	11	11
(Germany) P Franziska (Puerto Rico) A Díaz	11	8	8	9
(Slovakia) Ľ Pištej (Slovakia) T Kukuľková	6	6	6
4	(Hong Kong) Wong C T (Hong Kong) Doo H K	11	11	11

Quarter-finals
7	(Germany) D Qiu (Germany) S Winter	11	7	11	9
4	(Hong Kong) Wong C T (Hong Kong) Doo H K	7	11	13	11

==== Section 4 ====
First round
WC	(Sweden) M Karlsson (Germany) N Mittelham	9	7	11	11	11
WC	(Egypt) O Assar (Egypt) H Goda	11	11	8	6	8
(Canada) E Ly (Canada) M Zhang	11	8	11	8	3
(Chile) G Gomez (Chile) D Ortega	1	11	3	11	11

Second round
6	(Spain) Á Robles (Spain) M Xiao	11	9	11	11
WC	(Sweden) M Karlsson (Germany) N Mittelham	5	11	9	6
(Chile) G Gomez (Chile) D Ortega	12	6	11	11
2	(Brazil) H Calderano (Brazil) B Takahashi	10	11	9	7

Quarter-finals
6	(Spain) Á Robles (Spain) M Xiao	11	5	1	11	11
(Chile) G Gomez (Chile) D Ortega	6	11	11	6	6

Preceded by WTT Champions Yokohama 2026	2026 WTT Series	Succeeded by WTT Contender Almaty 2026
