= Ultimate Table Tennis =

Table tennis league in India

- Current season, competition or edition: 2026 Ultimate Table Tennis
- Sport: Table Tennis
- Founded: 2017
- First season: 2017
- Owner: 11Sports Pvt Ltd
- President: Vita Dani
- Administrator: Table Tennis Federation of India
- No. of teams: 7
- Country: India
- Most recent champion: U Mumba TT (2026)
- Most titles: U Mumba TT (2025, 2026), Goa Challengers (2023, 2024)
- Broadcaster: Star Sports
- Streaming partner: JioHotstar(India) YouTube(Rest of the world)
- Website: Website

Ultimate Table Tennis(UTT), officially known as Butterfly Ultimate Table Tennis for sponsorship reasons, is a professional level table tennis league in India. Launched in 2017, it consists of 7 teams. The league is under the auspices of Table Tennis Federation of India. The current champions (2025) are U Mumba TT who defeated Jaipur Patriots in the 2025 finals.

Falcons TTC won the first season with a 14–9 score against Shazé Challengers. Dabang Delhi TTC won the second season with a 11–7 result against defending champs Falcons TTC. Chennai Lions won their season three victory with an 8–1 score against defending champions Dabang Delhi TTC. Season four saw Goa Challengers winning with an 8–7 game against defenders Chennai Lions. Goa Challengers defended their title with an 8–2 win over Dabang Delhi TTC in season 5.

== Format ==
A tie is an encounter between 2 teams and consists of 5 matches. Every match consists of three games. Every game is played up to eleven points. The team, that have won the most games of a tie is the winner.

Golden Point rule:

If a game is tied at 10-10, the next point in the Game shall be known as the Golden Point and the winner of such Golden Point shall be the winner of that Game point

No.	Type	Player A	Player B
1	MS	Indian / Foreign	Indian / Foreign
2	WS	Indian / Foreign	Indian / Foreign
3	XD	Foreign / Indian or Indian / Indian	Foreign / Indian or Indian / Indian
4	MS	Indian / Foreign	Indian / Foreign
5	WS	Indian / Foreign	Indian / Foreign

== Teams ==
=== Current teams ===
Locations of the seven UTT teams

Team	City	Debut	Coaches	Owner
Ahmedabad APL Pipers	Ahmedabad, Gujarat	2024	(India) Sourav Chakraborty (Portugal) Francisco Santos	SG Sports
UP Prometheans	Uttar Pradesh	2026	(India) Abhishek Yadav (Germany) Chris Pfeiffer	Mukesh Sharma
Dabang Delhi TTC	New Delhi, Delhi	2017	(India) Srivatsa Chakraborty (Czech Republic) Petr David	Radha Kapoor Khanna
Goa Challengers	Panaji, Goa	2019	(India) Parag Agrawal (Netherlands) Elena Timina	Shrinivas Dempo; Vivek Bhargava
HVR Kolkata Thunder Blades	Kolkata, West Bengal	2025	(India) Jubin Kumar (Sweden) Tobias Bergman	Uneecops Group; MVikas Group
PBG Pune Jaguars	Pune, Maharashtra	2025	(India) Sachin Shetty (France) Julien Girard	Punit Balan Group
U Mumba TT	Mumbai, Maharashtra	2019	(India) Jay Modak (Republic of Ireland) John Murphy	Unilazer Ventures Pvt. Ltd.

=== Former teams ===
Team	Debut	Dissolved	Owner
Falcons TTC	2017	2018	Rizwan Amlani
Shazé Challengers	2017	2017	Vivek Bhargava
Oilmax-Stag Yoddhas	2017	2017	Oilmax Energy Pvt Ltd; Stag International
Maharashtra United	2017	2018	DHFL
Warriors TTC	2018	2018	
RP-SG Mavericks Kolkata	2017	2019	Sanjiv Goenka; Utsav Parekh
Puneri Paltan TT	2019	2024	Insurekot Sports Pvt. Ltd.
Bengaluru Smashers	2024	2024	Punit Balan
Jaipur Patriots	2024	2025	World of Krida Private Limited
Chennai Lions	2019	2025	S Rangarajan; Rekha Murthy; GS Ravi; Vinay Chandra

== Editions and results ==
There have been five seasons of Ultimate Table Tennis. Goa Challengers have won the league two times in 2023 and 2024. Dabang Delhi TTC have been in the finals thrice and won it once. Chennai Lions have been in the finals twice and won it once.

Year	Final			Venue	Total Teams
Year	Winner	Result	Runners up	Venue	Total Teams
2017	Falcons TTC	14–9	Shazé Challengers	Sardar Vallabhbhai Patel Indoor Stadium, Mumbai	6
2018	Dabang Delhi TTC	11–7	Falcons TTC	Netaji Indoor Stadium, Kolkata	6
2019	Chennai Lions	8–1	Dabang Delhi TTC	Thyagaraj Sports Complex, New Delhi	6
2023	Goa Challengers	8–7	Chennai Lions	Shree Shiv Chhatrapati Sports Complex, Pune	6
2024	Goa Challengers	8–2	Dabang Delhi TTC	Jawaharlal Nehru Stadium, Chennai	8
2025	U Mumba TT	8–4	Jaipur Patriots	EKA Arena, Ahmedabad	8
2026	U Mumba TT	8-5	Dempo Goa Challengers	Dr. Shyama Prasad Indoor Stadium, Santa Cruz, Goa	7

== Squads ==
=== Season 1 (2017) ===
Team	Players		Coaches
Team	Male	Female	Coaches
Falcons TTC	(Sweden) Par Gerell (England) Liam Pitchford (India) Sanil Shetty (India) Arjun Ghosh	(China) Wu Yang (Hong Kong) Lee Ho Ching (India) Sutirtha Mukherjee (India) Priyadarshini Das	(Portugal) Francisco Santos (India) Soumyadeep Roy
Shazé Challengers	(China) Li Ping (Croatia) Andrej Gaćina (India) Soumyajit Ghosh (India) Manav Thakkar	(Germany) Han Ying (Germany) Petrissa Solja (India) Mouma Das (India) Moumita Datta	(Netherlands) Elena Timina (India) A. Muralidhara Rao
Dabang Smashers TTC	(Portugal) Marcos Freitas (Ukraine) Kou Lei (India) Sathiyan Gnanasekaran (India) A. Amalraj	(Turkey) Hu Melek (Ukraine) Tetyana Bilenko (India) Madhurika Patkar (India) Mousumi Paul	(United States) Ilija Lupulesku (India) N. Ravichandran
DHFL Maharashtra United	(Hong Kong) Wong Chun Ting (Portugal) Joao Monteiro (India) Harmeet Desai (India) Ronit Bhanja	(Austria) Liu Jia (Portugal) Fu Yu (India) Krittwika Sinha Roy (India) Pooja Sahasrabudhe	(Hungary) Ferenc Karsai (India) Arup Basak
Oilmax-Stag Yoddhas	(Greece) Panagiotis Gionis (Nigeria) Quadri Aruna (India) Jubin Kumar (India) Abhishek Yadav	(Hong Kong) Doo Hoi Kem (Russia) Polina Mikhailova (India) Manika Batra (India) Selena Selvakumar	(Slovenia) Vesna Ojsteršek (India) Sandeep Gupta
RP-SG Mavericks	(Portugal) Tiago Apolonia (Austria) Stefan Fegerl (India) Sharath Kamal (India) Birdie Boro	(Austria) Sofia Polcanova (Germany) Sabine Winter (India) Archana Kamath (India) Amrutha Pushpak	(Germany) Peter Engel (India) Sachin Shetty

=== Season 2 (2018) ===
Team	Players		Coaches
Team	Male	Female	Coaches
Dabang Delhi TTC	(Japan) Yoshida Masaki (Belgium) Cedric Nuytinck (India) Sathiyan Gnanasekaran (India) Sanish Ambekar	(Japan) Sakura Mori (Puerto Rico) Adriana Diaz (India) Archana Kamath (India) Manika Batra	(Romania) Andrei Filimon (India) Sachin Shetty
RP-SG Mavericks	(Ukraine) Kou Lei (Sweden) Mattias Karlsson (India) Harmeet Desai (India) Siddhesh Pande	(Hong Kong) Doo Hoi Kem (Germany) Sabine Winter (India) Ayhika Mukherjee (India) Mouma Das	(Netherlands) Elena Timina (India) Arup Basak
Falcons TTC	(England) Liam Pitchford (Spain) Álvaro Robles (India) Sanil Shetty (India) Ronit Bhanja	(Romania) Bernadette Szocs (Sweden) Matilda Ekholm (India) Sutirtha Mukherjee (India) Priyadarshini Das	(Slovenia) Vesna Ojsteršek (India) Soumyadeep Roy
Empowerji Challengers	(France) Simon Gauzy (Portugal) Tiago Apolonia (India) Manav Thakkar (India) Arjun Ghosh	(Hong Kong) Lee Ho Ching (Hungary) Georgina Pota (India) Divya Deshpande (India) Prapti Sen	(Germany) Peter Engel (India) A. Muralidhara Rao
Maharashtra United	(Sweden) Kristian Karlsson (Portugal) João Monteiro (India) Anthony Amalraj (India) Utkarsh Gupta	(Romania) Elizabeta Samara (United States) Lily Zhang (India) Madhurika Patkar (India) Selena D. Selvakumar	(Portugal) Francisco Santos (India) N. Ravichandran
Yoddhas Warriors TTC	(Nigeria) Quadri Aruna (Chinese Taipei) Chuang Chih-Yuan (India) Sharath Kamal (India) Ravindra Kotiyan	(Austria) Sofia Polcanova (Czech Republic) Hana Matelova (India) Pooja Sahasrabudhe (India) Sreeja Akula	(Hungary) Ferenc Karsai (India) Sandeep Gupta

=== Season 3 (2019) ===
Team	Players		Coaches
Team	Male	Female	Coaches
Chennai Lions	(Portugal) Tiago Apolonia (India) Sharath Kamal (India) Anirban Ghosh	(Germany) Petrissa Solja (India) Madhurika Patkar (India) Yashini Sivansakar	(Germany) Peter Engel (India) A. Muralidhara Rao
Dabang Delhi TTC	(Sweden) Jon Persson (India) Sathiyan Gnanasekaran (India) Parth Virmani	(Romania) Bernadette Szocs (India) Krittwika Sinha Roy (India) Naina Jaiswal	(Slovenia) Vesna Ojsteršek (India) Sachin Shetty
Goa Challengers	(Spain) Álvaro Robles (India) Amalraj Anthony (India) Siddhesh Pande	(Chinese Taipei) Cheng I-Ching (India) Archana Kamath (India) Shruti Amrute	(Netherlands) Elena Timina (India) Arup Basak
Puneri Paltan TT	(Chinese Taipei) Chuang Chih-Yuan (India) Harmeet Desai (India) Ronit Bhanja	(Germany) Sabine Winter (India) Ayhika Mukherjee (India) Selena Selvakumar	(Portugal) Francisco Santos (India) Parag Agrawal
RP-SG Mavericks Kolkata	(Germany) Benedikt Duda (India) Sanil Shetty (India) Manush Shah	(Sweden) Matilda Ekholm (India) Manika Batra (India) Prapti Sen	(Hungary) Zoltan Batorfi (India) N. Ravichandran
U Mumba TT	(Kazakhstan) Kirill Gerassimenko (India) Manav Thakkar (India) Jeet Chandra	(Hong Kong) Doo Hoi Kem (India) Sutirtha Mukherjee (India) Moumita Datta	(United States) Jiaqi Zheng (India) Soumyadeep Roy

=== Season 4 (2023) ===
Team	Players		Coaches
Team	Male	Female	Coaches
PBG Bengaluru Smashers	(Kazakhstan) Kirill Gerassimenko (India) Sanil Shetty (India) Ankur Bhattacharjee	(Poland) Natalia Bajor (India) Manika Batra (India) Poymantee Baisya	(Slovenia) Vesna Ojsteršek (India) Sachin Shetty
Chennai Lions	(Germany) Benedikt Duda (India) Sharath Kamal (India) Payas Jain	(Australia) Liu Yangzi (India) Sutirtha Mukherjee (India) Prapti Sen	(Germany) Jörg Bitzigeio (India) Somnath Ghosh
Dabang Delhi TTC	(Sweden) Jon Persson (India) Sathiyan Gnanasekaran (India) Anirban Ghosh	(Slovakia) Barbora Balazova (India) Ayhika Mukherjee (India) Sreeja Akula	(Serbia) Slobodan Grujić (India) A Muralidhara Rao
Goa Challengers	(Spain) Álvaro Robles (India) Amalraj Anthony (India) Harmeet Desai	(Thailand) Suthasini Sawettabut (India) Reeth Tennison (India) Krittwika Sinha Roy	(Netherlands) Elena Timina (India) Parag Agrawal
Puneri Paltan TTC	(Egypt) Omar Assar (India) Manush Shah (India) Snehit Suravajjula	(Czech Republic) Hana Matelova (India) Archana Kamath (India) Anusha Kutumbale	(Hungary) Zoltan Batorfi (India) N. Ravichandran
U Mumba TT	(Nigeria) Quadri Aruna (India) Manav Thakkar (India) Sudhanshu Grover	(United States) Lily Zhang (India) Mouma Das (India) Diya Chitale	(Portugal) Francisco Santos (India) Anshul Garg

=== Season 5 (2024) ===
The 2024 Ultimate Table Tennis league saw 48 players, including 16 internationals. Two new teams namely Ahmedabad SG Pipers and Jaipur Patriots made their debut in season 5 of UTT.

Team	Players		Coaches
Team	Male	Female	Coaches
PBG Bengaluru Smashers	(Spain) Alvaro Robles (India) Amalraj Antony (India) Jeet Chandra	(United States) Lily Zhang (India) Manika Batra (India) Taneesha Kotecha	(Netherlands) Elena Timina (India) Anshuman Roy
Ahmedabad SG Pipers	(France) Lilian Bardet (India) Manush Shah (India) Jash Modi	(Romania) Bernadette Szocs (India) Pritha Vartikar (India) Reeth Rishya	(Portugal) Francisco Santos (India) Jay Modak
Dabang Delhi TTC	(Austria) Andreas Levenko (India) Sathiyan Gnanasekaran (India) Yashansh Malik	(Thailand) Orawan Paranang (India) Diya Chitale (India) Lakshita Narang	(Slovenia) Vesna Ojsteršek (India) Sachin Shetty
U Mumba TT	(Nigeria) Quadri Aruna (India) Manav Thakkar (India) Akash Pal	(Spain) Maria Xiao (India) Sutirtha Mukherjee (India) Kavyasree Baskar	(Republic of Ireland) John Murphy (India) Anshul Garg
Goa Challengers	(Italy) Mihai Bobocica (India) Harmeet Desai (India) Sudhanshu Grover	(Australia) Liu Yangzi (India) Yashaswini Ghorpade (India) Sayali Wani	(Hungary) Zoltan Batorfi (India) Subhajit Saha
Puneri Paltan TT	(Portugal) João Monteiro (India) Anirban Ghosh (India) Ankur Bhattacharjee	(Germany) Nina Mittelham (India) Ayhika Mukherjee (India) Yashini Sivashankar	(Germany) Jorg Bitzigeio (India) Parag Agrawal
Jaipur Patriots	(South Korea) Cho Seungmin (India) Snehit Suravajjula (India) Ronit Bhanja	(Thailand) Suthasini Sawettabut (India) Sreeja Akula (India) Moumita Dutta	(Croatia) Ronald Redep (India) Somnath Ghosh
Chennai Lions	(France) Jules Rolland (India) Sharath Kamal (India) Abhinandh PB	(Japan) Sakura Mori (India) Mouma Das (India) Poymantee Baisya	(Sweden) Tobias Bergman (India) Subin Kumar

=== Season 6 (2025) ===
Team	Players		Coaches
Team	Male	Female	
Ahmedabad SG Pipers	(Germany) Ricardo Walther (India) Snehit Suravajjula (India) Divyansh Srivastava	(Italy) Giorgia Piccolin (India) Manika Batra (India) Yashini Sivashankar	(Germany) Chris Pfeiffer (India) Somnath Ghosh
Chennai Lions	(Kazakhstan) Kirill Gerassimenko (India) Payas Jain (India) Sudhanshu Grover	(China) Fan Siqi (India) Nikhat Banu (India) Jennifer Varghese	(Germany) Jorg Bitzigeio (India) Soumyadeep Roy
Dabang Delhi TTC	(Singapore) Izaac Quek (India) Sathiyan Gnanasekaran (India) Sourav Saha	(Spain) Maria Xiao (India) Diya Chitale (India) Suhana Saini	(France) Julien Girard (India) Raman Subramaniam
Goa Challengers	(Portugal) Tiago Apolonia (India) Harmeet Desai (India) Ronit Bhanja	(Singapore) Zeng Jian (India) Krittwika Sinha Roy (India) Sayali Wani	(India) Parag Agrawal (Netherlands) Elena Timina
Jaipur Patriots	(United States) Kanak Jha (India) Jeet Chandra (India) Yashansh Malik	(Netherlands) Britt Eerland (India) Sreeja Akula (India) Pritha Vartikar	(India) Sachin Shetty (Czech Republic) Pavel Rehorek
Kolkata Thunder Blades	(Nigeria) Quadri Aruna (India) Ankur Bhattacharjee (India) Deepit Patil	(Puerto Rico) Adriana Diaz (India) Selena Selvakumar (India) Ananya Chande	(India) Jubin Kumar (Sweden) Tobias Bergman
PBG Pune Jaguars	(Spain) Alvaro Robles (India) Anirban Ghosh (India) Mudit Dani	(Egypt) Dina Meshref (India) Reeth Rishya (India) Taneesha Kotecha	(Slovenia) Vesna Ojsteršek (India) Subhojit Saha
U Mumba TT	(France) Lilian Bardet (India) Akash Pal (India) Abhinandh PB	(Romania) Bernadette Szocs (India) Yashaswini Ghorpade (India) Swastika Ghosh	(India) Jay Modak (Republic of Ireland) John Murphy

=== Season 7 (2026) ===
The 2026 Ultimate Table Tennis league will see 42 players, including 17 Olympians. UP Prometheans will be making their Debut.

Teams	Players	Players	Coaches
Teams	Male	Female	Coaches
Ahmedabad APL Pipers	(Belgium) Adrien Rassenfosse (India) Payas Jain (India) Sanil Shetty	(India) Kavya Bhatt (India) Manika Batra (Austria) Sofia Polcanova	(India) Sourav Chakraborty (Portugal) Francisco Santos
UP Promtheans	(India) Manav Thakkar (Germany) Ricardo Walther (India) Sudhanshu Grover	(Australia) Liu Yangzi (India) Sayali Wani (India) Swastika Ghosh	(India) Abhishek Yadav (Germany) Chris Pfeiffer
Dabang Delhi TTC	(India) Sathiyan Gnanasekaran (Egypt) Youssef Abdelaziz (India) Raegan Albuquerque	(India) Sutirtha Mukherjee (India) Divyanshi Bhowmick (Spain) Maria Xiao	(India) Srivatsa Chakraborty (Czech Republic) Petr David
Dempo Goa Challengers	(India) Divyansh Srivastava (India) Abhinandh PB (Spain) Alvaro Robles	(Romania) Bernadette Szocs (India) Syndrela Das (India) Ananya Chande	(India) Parag Agrawal (Netherlands) Elena Timina
HVR Kolkata Thunder Blades	(India) Ankur Bhattacharjee (India) Jeet Chandra (Romania) Eduard Ionescu	(India) Taneesha Kotecha (India) Ayhika Mukherjee (Singapore) Zeng Jian	(India) Jubin Kumar (Sweden) Tobias Bergman
PBG Pune Jaguars	(India) Snehit SFR (Egypt) Omar Assar (India) Mudit Dani	(India) Diya Chitale (France) Pritika Pavade (India) Sayanika Maji	(India) Sachin Shetty (France) Julien Girard
U Mumba TT	(India) Manush Shah (France) Lilian Bardet (India) Akash Pal	(Wales) Anna Hursey (India) Nithyashree Mani (India) Anusha Kutumbale	(India) Jay Modak (Republic of Ireland) John Murphy

== League standings ==
=== Season 1 ===
Position	Team	Ties		Matches	Points
Position	Team	Played	Won	Matches	Points
1	Falcons TTC	5	3	27	78
2	Shazé Challengers	5	4	24	73
3	Dabang Delhi TTC	5	3	28	69
4	DHFL Maharashtra United	5	2	21	64
5	Oilmax-Stag Yoddhas	5	2	18	61
6	RP-SG Mavericks	5	1	17	60

=== Season 2 ===
Position	Team	Ties		Matches	Points
Position	Team	Played	Won	Matches	Points
1	Dabang Delhi TTC	5	3	23	63
2	RP-SG Mavericks	5	4	20	58
3	Falcons TTC	5	4	21	56
4	Maharashtra United	5	2	15	49
5	Warriors TTC	5	1	13	47
6	Empowerji Challengers	5	1	13	42

=== Season 3 ===
Position	Team	Ties		Matches	Points
Position	Team	Played	Won	Matches	Points
1	U Mumba TTC	5	4	16	44
2	Chennai Lions	5	3	14	42
3	Goa Challengers	5	3	15	41
4	Dabang Delhi TTC	5	3	13	41
5	RP-SG Mavericks	5	1	10	30
6	Puneri Paltan TT	5	1	7	27

=== Season 4 ===
Position	Team	Ties		Matches	Points
Position	Team	Played	Won	Matches	Points
1	Dabang Delhi TTC	5	3	14	42
2	Chennai Lions	5	2	14	41
3	Puneri Paltan TT	5	3	14	38
4	Goa Challengers	5	2	13	36
5	Bengaluru Smashers	5	3	15	35
6	U Mumba TT	5	2	8	33

=== Season 5 ===
Position	Team	Ties		Matches	Points
Position	Team	Played	Won	Matches	Points
1	Bengaluru Smashers	5	4	16	48
2	Ahmedabad SG Pipers	5	3	17	42
3	Dabang Delhi TTC	5	3	14	41
4	Goa Challengers	5	3	11	37
5	Chennai Lions	5	2	13	37
6	U Mumba TT	5	2	12	36
7	Puneri Paltan TT	5	2	10	31
8	Jaipur Patriots	5	1	7	28

=== Season 6 ===
Position	Team	Ties		Matches	Points
Position	Team	Played	Won	Matches	Points
1	Dabang Delhi TTC	5	4	15	44
2	Goa Challengers	5	3	16	44
3	U Mumba TT	5	3	15	42
4	Jaipur Patriots	5	4	16	41
5	Kolkata Thunder Blades	5	2	14	36
6	Pune Jaguars	5	2	9	34
7	Ahmedabad SG Pipers	5	2	8	30
8	Chennai Lions	5	0	7	29

=== Season 7 ===
Position	Team	Ties		Matches	Points
Position	Team	Played	Won	Matches	Points
1	Dempo Goa Challengers	6	6	19	56
2	HVR Kolkata Thunder Blades	6	4	16	49
3	U Mumba TT	6	3	18	48
4	Dabang Delhi TTC	6	3	16	45
5	Ahmedabad APL Pipers	6	2	11	36
6	PBG Pune Jaguars	6	1	12	34
7	UP Prometheans	6	1	8	32
