= Table tennis at the 2026 Asian Games – Mixed doubles =

Mixed doubles at the 2026 Asian Games
- Venue: Sky Hall Toyota
- Dates: 22–26 September 2026
- Competitors: 82 from 23 nations

Medalists
gold medal	Kuai Man; Lin Shidong	China
silver medal	Sun Yingsha; Wang Manyu	China
bronze medal	Shin Yu-bin; Lim Jong-hoon	South Korea
bronze medal	Diya Chitale; Manush Shah	India

Table tennis at the 2026 Asian Games – Mixed doubles was one of the events of the table tennis competition at the 2026 Asian Games. Matches through the quarterfinals were played as best-of-five, while the semifinals and final were played as best-of-seven.

== Seeds ==
- Doubles seeding was determined by adding the individual doubles rankings on September 14; the lower the sum, the higher the seeding.
1. (South Korea) Shin Yu-bin / Lim Jong-hoon
2. (China) Sun Yingsha / Wang Chuqin
3. (Hong Kong) Doo Hoi Kem / Wong Chun Ting
4. (China) Kuai Man / Lin Shidong
5. (India) Manush Shah / Diya Chitale
6. (Chinese Taipei) Cheng I-ching / Lin Yun-ju
7. (Japan) Sora Matsushima / Miwa Harimoto
8. (India) Yashaswini Ghorpade / Harmeet Desai
9. (Singapore) Koen Pang / Zeng Jian
10. (South Korea) Oh Jun-sung / Kim Na-yeong
11. (Hong Kong) Ng Wing Lam / Yiu Kwan To
12. (Singapore) Loy Ming Ying / Izaac Quek
13. (Kazakhstan) Sarvinoz Mirkadirova / Iskender Kharki
14. (Thailand) Kulapassr Vijitviriyagul / Thitaphat Preechayan
15. (Maldives) Moosa Ahmed / Aishath Nazim
16. (Indonesia) Almaira Nebuchadnezzar / Muhammad Junindra

== Knockout stage ==
=== Finals ===
Semifinals
1	Shin Y. (KOR); Lim J. (KOR) (bronze)	11	8	11	9	10	3
4	Kuai M. (CHN); Lin S. (CHN)	9	11	7	11	12	11
5	Shah M. (IND); Chitale D. (IND) (bronze)	8	5	8	2
2	Sun Y. (CHN); Wang C. (CHN)	11	11	11	11

Final
4	Kuai M. (CHN); Lin S. (CHN) (gold)	11	13	11	11
2	Sun Y. (CHN); Wang C. (CHN) (silver)	9	11	9	9

=== Top half ===
==== Section 1 ====
First round
Batmunkh B. (MGL); Myandal T. (MGL)	9	8	6
Zheng H. (MAC); Leong O. (MAC)	11	11	11
Ito M. (JPN); Shinozuka H. (JPN)	11	11	11
Dilshodov D. (UZB); Erkebaeva A. (UZB)	3	6	3

Second round
1	Shin Y. (KOR); Lim J. (KOR)	11	11	11
Ahussein M. (QAT); Mohamed A. (QAT)	3	5	5
Zheng H. (MAC); Leong O. (MAC)	11	8	11	6	5
13	Mirkadirova S. (KAZ); Kharki I. (KAZ)	9	11	8	11	11
9	Pang K. (SGP); Zeng J. (SGP)	8	4	6
Ito M. (JPN); Shinozuka H. (JPN)	11	11	11
Kasymov A. (KGZ); Aiazbekova N. (KGZ)	7	4	4
6	Cheng I. (TPE); Lin Y. (TPE)	11	11	11

Third round
1	Shin Y. (KOR); Lim J. (KOR)	11	11	11
13	Mirkadirova S. (KAZ); Kharki I. (KAZ)	5	4	6
Ito M. (JPN); Shinozuka H. (JPN)	5	9	3
6	Cheng I. (TPE); Lin Y. (TPE)	11	11	11

Quarterfinals
1	Shin Y. (KOR); Lim J. (KOR)	11	10	11	5	12
6	Cheng I. (TPE); Lin Y. (TPE)	7	12	7	11	10

==== Section 2 ====
First round
Khan K. (PAK); Khan M. (PAK)	6	8	4
Maharjan R. (NEP); Thapa E. (NEP)	11	11	11
Ashtari M. (IRI); Ghaffari A. (IRI)	15	10	5	3
Sanguansin P. (THA); Paranang O. (THA)	13	12	11	11

Second round
8	Ghorpade Y. (IND); Desai H. (IND)	9	11	11	9	11
Ali F. (MDV); Ismail M. (MDV)	11	6	7	11	6
Maharjan R. (NEP); Thapa E. (NEP)	2	6	7
11	Ng W. (HKG); Yiu K. (HKG)	11	11	11
16	Nebuchadnezzar A. (INA); Junindra M. (INA)	3	10	9
Sanguansin P. (THA); Paranang O. (THA)	11	12	11
Ri J. (PRK); Kim K. (PRK)	3	8	9
4	Kuai M. (CHN); Lin S. (CHN)	11	11	11

Third round
8	Ghorpade Y. (IND); Desai H. (IND)	11	11	10	11
11	Ng W. (HKG); Yiu K. (HKG)	6	5	12	7
Sanguansin P. (THA); Paranang O. (THA)	2	12	4	8
4	Kuai M. (CHN); Lin S. (CHN)	11	10	11	11

Quarterfinals
8	Ghorpade Y. (IND); Desai H. (IND)	5	10	9
4	Kuai M. (CHN); Lin S. (CHN)	11	12	11

=== Bottom half ===
==== Section 3 ====
First round
Sisomboun C. (LAO); Xaysavath X. (LAO)	6	11	8	2
Mahi N. (BAN); Ridoy M. (BAN)	11	9	11	11
Shrestha N. (NEP); Kapali S. (NEP)	11	6	6	9
Ser-Od A. (MGL); Ankhbayar B. (MGL)	2	11	11	11
Swarna B. (SRI); Kulappuwadu C. (SRI)	7	12	11	11
Abdulhussein A. (QAT); Ali M. (QAT)	11	10	3	4

Second round
3	Doo H. (HKG); Wong C. (HKG)	11	11	11
Kuan C. (MAC); Mak T. (MAC)	5	5	9
Mahi N. (BAN); Ridoy M. (BAN)	4	9	4
14	Vijitviriyagul K. (THA); Preechayan T. (THA)	11	11	11
15	Ahmed M. (MDV); Nazim A. (MDV)	7	5	11	11	11
Ser-Od A. (MGL); Ankhbayar B. (MGL)	11	11	9	9	9
Swarna B. (SRI); Kulappuwadu C. (SRI)	8	10	4
5	Shah M. (IND); Chitale D. (IND)	11	12	11

Third round
3	Doo H. (HKG); Wong C. (HKG)	11	11	11
14	Vijitviriyagul K. (THA); Preechayan T. (THA)	6	7	5
15	Ahmed M. (MDV); Nazim A. (MDV)	0	7	6
5	Shah M. (IND); Chitale D. (IND)	11	11	11

Quarterfinals
3	Doo H. (HKG); Wong C. (HKG)	6	15	9	5
5	Shah M. (IND); Chitale D. (IND)	11	13	11	11

==== Section 4 ====
First round
Pratama A. (INA); Putri C. (INA)	12	6	11	11	11
Iloukhani S. (IRI); Faraji B. (IRI)	14	11	5	9	8
Gerassimenko K. (KAZ); Akasheva Z. (KAZ)	13	5	8	3
Yeh Y. (TPE); Feng Y. (TPE)	11	11	11	11

Second round
7	Matsushima S. (JPN); Harimoto M. (JPN)	11	14	7	12	11
U T. (PRK); Pyon S. (PRK)	13	12	11	10	2
Pratama A. (INA); Putri C. (INA)	8	11	16	8
10	Oh J. (KOR); Kim N. (KOR)	11	9	18	11
12	Loy M. (SGP); Quek I. (SGP)	4	9	10
Yeh Y. (TPE); Feng Y. (TPE)	11	11	12
Iskandarov S. (UZB); Kamalova A. (UZB)	4	12	2
2	Sun Y. (CHN); Wang C. (CHN)	11	14	11

Third round
7	Matsushima S. (JPN); Harimoto M. (JPN)	9	11	9	11	14
10	Oh J. (KOR); Kim N. (KOR)	11	5	11	6	12
Yeh Y. (TPE); Feng Y. (TPE)	1	7	6
2	Sun Y. (CHN); Wang C. (CHN)	11	11	11

Quarterfinals
7	Matsushima S. (JPN); Harimoto M. (JPN)	10	11	8
2	Sun Y. (CHN); Wang C. (CHN)	12	13	11
