= WTT Champions Yokohama 2026 =

Table tennis tournament in Japan

Tournament details
- Dates: 4–9 August
- Edition: 2nd
- Total prize money: US$500,000
- Venue: Yokohama Buntai
- Location: Yokohama, Japan

Champions
- Men's singles: (Japan) Tomokazu Harimoto
- Women's singles: (Japan) Miwa Harimoto

The WTT Champions Yokohama 2026 was a table tennis tournament that took place at the Yokohama Buntai, Yokohama, Japan, from 4 to 9 August and had a total prize of US$500,000.

== Tournament ==
The WTT Champions Yokohama 2026 was the fifteenth tournament of the 2026 WTT Series and also part of the WTT Champions event.

=== Venue ===
This tournament was held at the Yokohama Buntai in Yokohama, Japan.

=== Point distribution ===
Below is the point distribution table for each phase of the tournament based on the WTT World Ranking for the WTT Champions event.

Event	Winner	Finalist	Semi-finalist	Quarter-finalist	Round of 16	Round of 32
Singles	1000	700	450	300	140	15

=== Prize pool ===
The total prize money is US$500,000 with the distribution of the prize money in accordance with WTT regulations.

Event	Winner	Finalist	Semi-finalist	Quarter-finalist	Round of 16	Round of 32
Singles	$40,000	$20,000	$11,750	$8,500	$6,000	$4,500

== Men's singles ==
=== Seeds ===
1. (Japan) Sora Matsushima (semi-finals)
2. (France) Félix Lebrun (quarter-finals)
3. (Japan) Tomokazu Harimoto (champion)
4. (Chinese Taipei) Lin Yun-ju (first round)
5. (South Korea) Jang Woo-jin (quarter-finals)
6. (France) Alexis Lebrun (quarter-finals)
7. (Germany) Dang Qiu (quarter-finals)
8. (China) Wen Ruibo (first round)

=== Finals ===
Semi-finals
1	(Japan) Sora Matsushima	4	9	11	17	5	9
3	(Japan) Tomokazu Harimoto	11	11	8	15	11	11
(South Korea) Oh Jun-sung	11	11	7	11	11
WC	(Japan) Hiroto Shinozuka	4	4	11	7	6

Final
3	(Japan) Tomokazu Harimoto	7	11	11	11	11
(South Korea) Oh Jun-sung	11	7	4	8	7

=== Top half ===
==== Section 1 ====
First round
1	(Japan) S Matsushima	14	11	9	11
(China) Zhou QH	12	9	11	9
(Chinese Taipei) Kuo G-h	6	6	11	11	9
(Denmark) A Lind	11	11	8	7	11
(France) S Gauzy	5	10	2
(China) Chen YY	11	12	11
(Sweden) A Källberg	11	8	9	8
5	(South Korea) Jang W-j	8	11	11	11

Second round
1	(Japan) S Matsushima	11	12	11
(Denmark) A Lind	9	10	7
(China) Chen YY	9	4	6
5	(South Korea) Jang W-j	11	11	11

Quarter-finals
1	(Japan) S Matsushima	10	11	1	11	10	11	11
5	(South Korea) Jang W-j	12	9	11	8	12	9	8

==== Section 2 ====
First round
3	(Japan) T Harimoto	11	11	11
(Australia) N Lum	3	6	5
(China) Xiang P	11	9	11	11
(Russia) V Sidorenko	8	11	9	8
(India) M Thakkar	11	8	6	11	6
(Slovenia) D Jorgić	9	11	11	7	11
(India) M Shah	5	5	8
6	(France) A Lebrun	11	11	11

Second round
3	(Japan) T Harimoto	11	11	11
(China) Xiang P	7	8	8
(Slovenia) D Jorgić	11	0	3	8
6	(France) A Lebrun	9	11	11	11

Quarter-finals
3	(Japan) T Harimoto	19	11	11	11
6	(France) A Lebrun	17	9	4	9

=== Bottom half ===
==== Section 3 ====
First round
7	(Germany) D Qiu	7	11	11	13
(South Korea) An J-h	11	9	8	11
(United States) K Jha	11	11	11
(Croatia) T Pucar	7	8	7
(South Korea) Oh J-s	12	11	11
(Egypt) O Assar	10	7	8
(South Korea) Lim J-h	9	11	11	11	11
4	(Chinese Taipei) Lin Y-j	11	9	7	13	9

Second round
7	(Germany) D Qiu	11	12	11
(United States) K Jha	8	10	6
(South Korea) Oh J-s	11	11	12
(South Korea) Lim J-h	8	4	10

Quarter-finals
7	(Germany) D Qiu	11	11	10	7	11	8	10
(South Korea) Oh J-s	5	7	12	11	9	11	12

==== Section 4 ====
First round
8	(China) Wen RB	8	11	8	8
WC	(Portugal) J Geraldo	11	7	11	11
WC	(Japan) H Shinozuka	9	11	11	5	11
(Japan) Y Uda	11	5	9	11	9
(Germany) B Duda	6	11	11	9	11
(Japan) S Togami	11	7	6	11	6
(France) F Coton	4	7	5
2	(France) F Lebrun	11	11	11

Second round
WC	(Portugal) J Geraldo	11	6	2	10
WC	(Japan) H Shinozuka	9	11	11	12
(Germany) B Duda	9	6	9
2	(France) F Lebrun	11	11	11

Quarter-finals
WC	(Japan) H Shinozuka	8	12	11	9	11	11
2	(France) F Lebrun	11	10	8	11	7	7

== Women's singles ==
=== Seeds ===
1. (Japan) Miwa Harimoto (champion)
2. (China) Kuai Man (semi-finals)
3. (China) Chen Xingtong (final)
4. (China) Wang Yidi (semi-finals)
5. (Japan) Hina Hayata (quarter-finals)
6. (Macau) Zhu Yuling (quarter-finals)
7. (South Korea) Shin Yu-bin (quarter-finals)
8. (Japan) Satsuki Odo (quarter-finals)

=== Finals ===
Semi-finals
1	(Japan) Miwa Harimoto	4	12	12	14	8	11
4	(China) Wang Yidi	11	10	10	12	11	6
3	(China) Chen Xingtong	11	11	11	5	11
2	(China) Kuai Man	8	7	9	11	5

Final
1	(Japan) Miwa Harimoto	13	11	9	11	1	11
3	(China) Chen Xingtong	11	7	11	9	11	7

=== Top half ===
==== Section 1 ====
First round
1	(Japan) M Harimoto	11	5	9	11	11
(Japan) H Hashimoto	5	11	11	9	5
(South Korea) Lee E-h	12	12	3	10	3
(China) Chen Y	10	10	11	12	11
(India) S Akula	9	11	11	12
(Austria) S Polcanova	11	8	6	10
(United States) A Wang	4	8	4
7	(South Korea) Shin Y-b	11	11	11

Second round
1	(Japan) M Harimoto	11	9	11	12	11
(China) Chen Y	13	11	5	10	5
(India) S Akula	2	6	11	11	5
7	(South Korea) Shin Y-b	11	11	8	7	11

Quarter-finals
1	(Japan) M Harimoto	11	11	11	11	11
7	(South Korea) Shin Y-b	5	3	13	8	5

==== Section 2 ====
First round
4	(China) Wang YD	8	11	11	11
WC	(Japan) M Ito	11	1	9	3
(Chinese Taipei) Cheng I-c	11	11	9	11
(Romania) E Samara	9	6	11	3
(France) J N Yuan	5	9	9
(Ukraine) M Pesotska	11	11	11
(South Korea) Joo C-h	8	6	11	6
6	(Macau) Zhu YL	11	11	7	11

Second round
4	(China) Wang YD	14	11	11	11
(Chinese Taipei) Cheng I-c	16	8	5	8
(Ukraine) M Pesotska	9	14	11	7
6	(Macau) Zhu YL	11	16	8	11

Quarter-finals
4	(China) Wang YD	5	11	13	11	11
6	(Macau) Zhu YL	11	4	11	8	8

=== Bottom half ===
==== Section 3 ====
First round
8	(Japan) S Odo	12	11	9	11
(Wales) A Hursey	10	7	11	5
(United States) L Zhang	11	12	7	11
(Poland) N Bajor	8	10	11	5
(Singapore) Zeng J	11	11	3	9
(France) P Pavade	8	13	11	11
(South Korea) Kim N-y	6	5	7
3	(China) Chen XT	11	11	11

Second round
8	(Japan) S Odo	11	11	8	11
(United States) L Zhang	5	7	11	7
(France) P Pavade	8	2	2
3	(China) Chen XT	11	11	11

Quarter-finals
8	(Japan) S Odo	4	6	7	7
3	(China) Chen XT	11	11	11	11

==== Section 4 ====
First round
5	(Japan) H Hayata	11	7	11	11
(Hong Kong) Doo H K	5	11	8	9
(Australia) Y Liu	9	6	5
(Chinese Taipei) Yeh Y-t	11	11	11
(Egypt) H Goda	9	11	11	7	9
(Romania) B Szőcs	11	5	6	11	11
WC	(India) M Batra	1	7	7
2	(China) Kuai M	11	11	11

Second round
5	(Japan) H Hayata	11	11	7	11
(Chinese Taipei) Yeh Y-t	3	3	11	2
(Romania) B Szőcs	7	6	6
2	(China) Kuai M	11	11	11

Quarter-finals
5	(Japan) H Hayata	7	8	4	12	6
2	(China) Kuai M	11	11	11	10	11

Preceded by WTT Star Contender São José dos Campos 2026	2026 WTT Series	Succeeded by Europe Smash – Sweden 2026
