= Ahmedabad APL Pipers =

Indian table tennis franchise team

- Sport: Table tennis
- Founded: 2024 (as Ahmedabad SG Pipers)
- League: Ultimate Table Tennis
- Based in: Ahmedabad, Gujarat
- Colors
- CEO: Mahesh Bhupathi
- Head coach: (India) Somnath Ghosh; (Germany) Chris Pfeiffer

Ahmedabad APL Pipers, formerly Ahmedabad SG Pipers is a table tennis franchise team based in Ahmedabad that plays in Ultimate Table Tennis. Founded in 2024, the team is owned by SG Sports, the sports arm of APL Apollo. Somnath Ghosh and Chris Pfeiffer are the coaches of the Ahmedabad APL Pipers for the 2025 edition.

== Squad ==
Year	Season	Players		Ref
Year	Season	Male	Female	Ref
2024	5	(France) Lilian Bardet (India) Manush Shah (India) Jash Modi	(Romania) Bernadette Szocs (India) Pritha Vartikar (India) Reeth Rishya	
2025	6	(India) Snehit Suravajjula (Germany) Ricardo Walther (India) Divyansh Srivastava	(India) Manika Batra (India) Yashini Sivashankar (Italy) Giorgia Piccolin	

== Coaches ==
Year	Coaches	Ref
2024	(India) Jay Modak (Portugal) Francisco Santos	
2025	(India) Somnath Ghosh (Germany) Chris Pfeiffer	

== Performance record ==
Year	Standing	Result	Ties		Matches	Points	Ref
Year	Standing	Result	Played	Won	Matches	Points	Ref
2024	#2 of 8	Semi Finals	5	3	17	42	
2025	#7 of 8		5	2	8	30	

== See also ==
- Delhi SG Pipers
