= Chennai Lions =

Indian professional table tennis franchise

- Sport: Table tennis
- Founded: 2019
- Disbanded: 2026
- Last season: 2025
- League: Ultimate Table Tennis
- Based in: Chennai, Tamil Nadu
- Stadium: Jawaharlal Nehru Indoor Stadium
- Colors: Yellow
- Owner: Aishwarya R. Dhanush, Sameer Bharat Ram
- Head coach: A. Muralidhara Rao; Peter Engel
- Championships: 1 (2019)

Chennai Lions was an Indian professional table tennis franchise team based in Chennai that played in the Ultimate Table Tennis. It was established in 2019 by film director Aishwarya R. Dhanush and entrepreneur Sameer Bharat Ram. They were the reigning champions of the league after defeating Dabang Delhi TTC in 2019 UTT finals.

== Players (2019) ==
Indian head coach - A. Muralidhara Rao
Foreign head coach - (Germany) Peter Engel
Player	Nat	Playing Hand
Sharath Kamal	(India)	Right
Anirban Ghosh	(India)	Right
Madhurika Patkar	(India)	Right
Yashini Sivasankar	(India)	Right
Petrissa Solja	(Germany)	Left
Tiago Apolonia	(Portugal)	Right

== Honours ==
=== Domestic ===
- Ultimate Table Tennis

- Winners (1): 2019
