= 2024 European Table Tennis Championships – Women's singles =

Women's singles at the 2024 European Table Tennis Championships
- Venue: TipsArena Linz
- Location: Linz, Austria
- Dates: 15–20 October

Medalists
gold medal	Sofia Polcanova (AUT)
silver medal	Bernadette Szőcs (ROU)
bronze medal	María Xiao (ESP)
bronze medal	Nina Mittelham (GER)

The women's singles competition of the 2024 European Table Tennis Championships was held from 15 to 20 October 2024.

== Playing system ==
Draw of 64
32 seeded players
32 winners of the qualification groups

== Group Play Stage ==
The winners of the groups will qualify to the Main Draw.
The runners-up from all the groups will play 2 preliminary rounds for the remaining 8 spots.

== Main Draw ==
Results

=== Section 1 ===
Round of 64
1	B Szőcs (ROU)	4
M Berzosa (ESP)	0
E Zaharia (ROU)	0
29	A Kaufmann (GER)	4
20	I Malobabić (CRO)	4
T Georgieva (BUL)	0
A Chiriacova (MDA)	0
9	L Bergström (SWE)	4
15	H Matelová (CZE)	3
A Maksuti (SRB)	4
L Rakovac (CRO)	1
19	I Lupulesku (SRB)	4
21	C Lutz (FRA)	4
B Balážová (SVK)	0
L Hochart (FRA)	4
6	B Eerland (NED)	3

Round of 32
1	B Szőcs (ROU)	4
29	A Kaufmann (GER)	0
20	I Malobabić (CRO)	0
9	L Bergström (SWE)	4
A Maksuti (SRB)	3
19	I Lupulesku (SRB)	4
21	C Lutz (FRA)	4
L Hochart (FRA)	3

Round of 16
1	B Szőcs (ROU)	4
9	L Bergström (SWE)	2
19	I Lupulesku (SRB)	1
21	C Lutz (FRA)	4

Quarterfinals
1	B Szőcs (ROU)	4
21	C Lutz (FRA)	2

=== Section 2 ===
Round of 64
5	P Pavade (FRA)	4
N Arlia (ITA)	0
T Kukuľková (SVK)	3
17	G Pota (HUN)	4
18	M Xiao (ESP)	4
S Šurjan (SRB)	2
Ö Yilmaz (TUR)	2
13	A Diaconu (ROU)	4
12	G Piccolin (ITA)	4
S Klee (GER)	1
A Zarif (FRA)	3
27	A Dragoman (ROU)	4
24	D Vivarelli (ITA)	1
B Bálint (HUN)	4
A Sterner (AUT)	1
3	JN Yuan (FRA)	4

Round of 32
5	P Pavade (FRA)	1
17	G Pota (HUN)	4
18	M Xiao (ESP)	4
13	A Diaconu (ROU)	2
12	G Piccolin (ITA)	1
27	A Dragoman (ROU)	4
B Bálint (HUN)	0
3	JN Yuan (FRA)	4

Round of 16
17	G Pota (HUN)	2
18	M Xiao (ESP)	4
27	A Dragoman (ROU)	0
3	JN Yuan (FRA)	4

Quarterfinals
18	M Xiao (ESP)	4
3	JN Yuan (FRA)	3

=== Section 3 ===
Round of 64
4	N Mittelham (GER)	4
A Toliou (GRE)	0
G Monfardini (ITA)	4
26	S De Nutte (LUX)	2
22	M Pesotska (UKR)	1
R Moret (SUI)	4
M Griesel (GER)	0
16	F Yu (POR)	4
10	J Shao (POR)	4
R Betz (FIN)	0
M Jeger (CRO)	4
25	S Altinkaya (TUR)	2
32	Y Wan (GER)	4
SX Zhang (ESP)	2
T-T Ho (ENG)	4
7	N Bajor (POL)	1

Round of 32
4	N Mittelham (GER)	4
G Monfardini (ITA)	3
R Moret (SUI)	0
16	F Yu (POR)	4
10	J Shao (POR)	4
M Jeger (CRO)	3
32	Y Wan (GER)	4
T-T Ho (ENG)	3

Round of 16
4	N Mittelham (GER)	4
16	F Yu (POR)	2
10	J Shao (POR)	1
32	Y Wan (GER)	4

Quarterfinals
4	N Mittelham (GER)	4
10	Y Wan (GER)	1

=== Section 4 ===
Round of 64
8	E Samara (ROU)	4
N Skerbinz (AUT)	1
C Lutz (FRA)	2
30	S Brateyko (UKR)	4
31	F Schreiner (GER)	4
H Arapović (CRO)	3
M Pinto (POR)	0
11	S Winter (GER)	4
14	C Källberg (SWE)	4
I Matos (POR)	3
Y Liu (AUT)	3
28	A Hursey (WAL)	4
23	I Singeorzan (ROU)	3
V Matyunina (UKR)	4
C Carey (WAL)	0
2	S Polcanova (AUT)	4

Round of 32
8	E Samara (ROU)	4
30	S Brateyko (UKR)	1
31	F Schreiner (GER)	1
11	S Winter (GER)	4
14	C Källberg (SWE)	4
28	A Hursey (WAL)	0
V Matyunina (UKR)	0
2	S Polcanova (AUT)	4

Round of 16
8	E Samara (ROU)	3
11	S Winter (GER)	4
14	C Källberg (SWE)	0
2	S Polcanova (AUT)	4

Quarterfinals
11	S Winter (GER)	1
2	S Polcanova (AUT)	4

=== Finals ===
Quarterfinals			Semifinals			Final
1	B Szőcs (ROU)	4
21	C Lutz (FRA)	2	1	B Szőcs (ROU)	4
18	M Xiao (ESP)	4	18	M Xiao (ESP)	1
3	JN Yuan (FRA)	3				1	B Szőcs (ROU)	1
4	N Mittelham (GER)	4				2	S Polcanova (AUT)	4
10	Y Wan (GER)	1	4	N Mittelham (GER)	1
11	S Winter (GER)	1	2	S Polcanova (AUT)	4
2	S Polcanova (AUT)	4

== Participating nations ==
114 players from 34 nations.

- Individual Neutral Athletes (2)
- Austria (5)
- Azerbaijan (2)
- Belgium (1)
- Bulgaria (3)
- Croatia (5)
- Czech Republic (4)
- Denmark (3)
- England (1)
- Estonia (2)
- Finland (3)
- France (6)
- Germany (8)
- Hungary (3)
- Israel (1)
- Italy (5)
- Latvia (2)
- Lithuania (2)
- Luxembourg (1)
- Moldova (2)
- Netherlands (2)
- North Macedonia (1)
- Norway (2)
- Poland (4)
- Portugal (5)
- Romania (6)
- Scotland (2)
- Serbia (4)
- Slovakia (5)
- Slovenia (3)
- Spain (5)
- Sweden (5)
- Turkey (3)
- Ukraine (4)
- Wales (2)
