= Table tennis at the 2019 European Games – Mixed doubles =

Table tennis – Mixed doubles at the 2019 European Games
- Venue: Tennis Olympic Centre
- Date: 23–25 June
- Competitors: 32 from 16 nations

Medalists
| gold medal | Patrick Franziska; Petrissa Solja | Germany |
| silver medal | Ovidiu Ionescu; Bernadette Szőcs | Romania |
| bronze medal | Tristan Flore; Laura Gasnier | France |

The mixed doubles in table tennis at the 2019 European Games in Minsk is the first edition of the event in a European Games. It was held at Tennis Olympic Centre from 23 June to 25 June 2019.

== Schedule ==
All times are FET (UTC+03:00)

| Date | Time | Event |
|---|---|---|
| Sunday, 23 June 2019 | 10:00 | First round |
| Monday, 24 June 2019 | 10:00 | Quarterfinals |
| Tuesday, 25 June 2019 | 10:00 | Semifinals |
| Tuesday, 25 June 2019 | 18:00 | Bronze medal match |
| Tuesday, 25 June 2019 | 19:00 | Gold medal match |

== Seeds ==
The seeding lists were announced on 9 June 2019.

1. Ľubomír Pištej / Barbora Balážová (SVK)
2. Stefan Fegerl / Sofia Polcanova (AUT)
3. Patrick Franziska / Petrissa Solja (GER)
4. Tristan Flore / Laura Gasnier (FRA)
5. Ádám Szudi / Szandra Pergel (HUN)
6. Ovidiu Ionescu / Bernadette Szőcs (ROU)
7. Álvaro Robles / Galia Dvorak (ESP)
8. Laurens Tromer / Britt Eerland (NED)
9. Alexander Shibaev / Polina Mikhaylova (RUS)
10. Mattias Falck / Matilda Ekholm (SWE)
11. Aleksandar Karakašević / Izabela Lupulesku (SRB)
12. Niagol Stoyanov / Giorgia Piccolin (ITA)
13. Cédric Nuytinck / Lisa Lung (BEL)
14. Jakub Dyjas / Natalia Partyka (POL)
15. Luka Mladenovic / Ni Xialian (LUX)
16. Pavel Platonov / Nadezhda Bogdanova (BLR)

== Results ==
First round
1 | Pištej (SVK); Balážová (SVK) | 11 | 11 | 11
15 | Mladenovic (LUX); Ni (LUX) | 9 | 6 | 15
11 | Karakašević (SRB); Lupulesku (SRB) | 11 | 7 | 8 | 11 | 6
7 | Robles (ESP); Dvorak (ESP) | 4 | 11 | 11 | 7 | 11
8 | Tromer (NED); Eerland (NED) | 9 | 11 | 11 | 8 | 8
12 | Stoyanov (ITA); Piccolin (ITA) | 11 | 6 | 6 | 11 | 11
10 | Falck (SWE); Ekholm (SWE) | 12 | 11 | 7 | 10
3 | Franziska (GER); Solja (GER) | 14 | 7 | 11 | 12
4 | Flore (FRA); Gasnier (FRA) | 11 | 8 | 14 | 7 | 11
13 | Dyjas (POL); Partyka (POL) | 8 | 11 | 12 | 11 | 5
16 | Platonov (BLR); Bogdanova (BLR) | 11 | 11 | 11
5 | Szudi (HUN); Pergel (HUN) | 8 | 8 | 6
6 | Ionescu (ROU); Szőcs (ROU) | 12 | 9 | 11 | 11
13 | Nuytinck (BEL); Lung (BEL) | 10 | 11 | 4 | 9
9 | Shibaev (RUS); Mikhaylova (RUS) | 6 | 12 | 11 | 11
2 | Fegerl (AUT); Polcanova (AUT) | 11 | 10 | 6 | 3

Quarterfinals
1 | Pištej (SVK); Balážová (SVK) | 11 | 14 | 11
7 | Robles (ESP); Dvorak (ESP) | 7 | 12 | 5
12 | Stoyanov (ITA); Piccolin (ITA) | 2 | 4 | 6
3 | Franziska (GER); Solja (GER) | 11 | 11 | 11
4 | Flore (FRA); Gasnier (FRA) | 11 | 7 | 11 | 12 | 11
16 | Platonov (BLR); Bogdanova (BLR) | 4 | 11 | 6 | 14 | 4
6 | Ionescu (ROU); Szőcs (ROU) | 11 | 11 | 11
9 | Shibaev (RUS); Mikhaylova (RUS) | 3 | 7 | 8

Semifinals
1 | Pištej (SVK); Balážová (SVK) | 6 | 11 | 11 | 4
3 | Franziska (GER); Solja (GER) | 11 | 6 | 13 | 11
4 | Flore (FRA); Gasnier (FRA) | 13 | 8 | 12 | 6 | 8
6 | Ionescu (ROU); Szőcs (ROU) | 11 | 11 | 10 | 11 | 11

Gold medal match
3 | Franziska (GER); Solja (GER) | 11 | 11 | 11
6 | Ionescu (ROU); Szőcs (ROU) | 4 | 4 | 4
Bronze medal match
1 | Pištej (SVK); Balážová (SVK) | 11 | 11 | 8 | 6
4 | Flore (FRA); Gasnier (FRA) | 6 | 13 | 11 | 11
