= 2026 Asian Table Tennis Championships – Mixed doubles =

Mixed doubles at the 2026 Asian Table Tennis Championships
- Venue: Olimpiya shaharchasi
- Date: 19–25 October 2026
- Competitors: 49 pairs from 26 nations

The Mixed doubles at the 2026 Asian Table Tennis Championships will be held in Tashkent, Uzbekistan from 19 to 25 October 2026.

== Format and Qualification ==
The tournament is played in a straight single-elimination knockout format (best-of-five games).

=== 2027 World Championships and World Cup Qualification ===
This event serves as the official Asian qualification tournament for the 2027 World Table Tennis Championships. Asia has been allocated a total of 14 continental quotas for the Mixed doubles event. The qualification spots are determined as follows:

- The 8 winners of the Round of 16 automatically qualify. (Note: Qualified means they will guarantee getting a spot in 2027 World Championships or Doubles World Cup, but final decision is based on each association. For instance, China and Japan might have different qualification selection based on World Ranking or national qualification matches. Even these players reach beyond Round of 16, their participation might be revoked.)
- The 8 losers of the Round of 16 will play one round of knockout matches; the 4 winners of these matches qualify.
- The 4 losers of the previous qualification round will play a progressive knockout to determine positions 13 to 16. The pairs finishing in 13th and 14th place will secure the final continental spots, while 15th and 16th places will be designated as reserves.

Additionally, the winners (gold medalists) of the Mixed doubles event will automatically qualify for the 2027 Doubles World Cup.

== Seeds ==
- Seeding was determined by combining the individual mixed doubles rankings; the lower the combined ranking, the higher the seeding.
1. (Hong Kong) Wong Chun Ting / Doo Hoi Kem
2. (Japan) Sora Matsushima / Miwa Harimoto
3. (China) Huang Youzheng / Chen Yi
4. (India) Harmeet Desai / Yashaswini Ghorpade
5. (Hong Kong) Yiu Kwan To / Ng Wing Lam
6. (India) Payas Jain / Syndrela Das
7. (Japan) Shunsuke Togami / Hina Hayata
8. (South Korea) Park Ganghyeon / Lee Daeun
9. (China) Yuan Licen / Wang Yidi
10. (Malaysia) Yap Rui Zhe / Tee Ai Xin
11. (Singapore) Izaac Quek / Loy Ming Ying
12. (Chinese Taipei) Hsu Hsien-chia / Wu Ying-syuan
13. (Singapore) Pang Koen / Ser Lin Qian
14. (Thailand) Thitaphat Preechayan / Kulapassr Vijitviriyagul
15. (Kazakhstan) Iskender Kharki / Sarvinoz Mirkadirova
16. (Bangladesh) Md Javed Ahmed / Khoy Sai

== Main Draw ==
=== Finals ===
Semifinals						Final
	(South Korea) Park Gy. (South Korea) Park Ga. (bronze)	6	4	11	6
3	(China) Huang Y. (China) Chen Y.	11	11	7	11	3	(China) Huang Y. (China) Chen Y. (silver)	11	9	11	8	9
4	(India) Desai H. (India) Ghorpade Y. (bronze)	9	9	8		2	(Japan) Matsushima S. (Japan) Harimoto M. (gold) (Note: Sora Matsushima and Miwa Harimoto beat China's Huang Youzheng and Chen Yi in a thrilling 3-2. It is Japan's first gold medal since 2021. They will get a spot in 2027 Doubles World Cup and 2027 World Championship, but this will be confirmed by Japanese national team coaches.)	8	11	8	11	11
2	(Japan) Matsushima S. (Japan) Harimoto M.	11	11	11

=== Top Half ===
==== Section 1 ====
Round of 64
(Sri Lanka) Kulappuwawadu C. (Sri Lanka) Alagiyawadu T. K.	4	4	11	2
(Iran) Faraji B. (Iran) Iloukhani S.	11	11	9	11
(Qatar) Abdulwahhab M. (Qatar) Mohamed A.	11	11	11	11	11
(Kyrgyzstan) Ergeshov A. (Kyrgyzstan) Kudusova S.	4	13	13	8	6
(Indonesia) Junindra M. (Indonesia) Nebuchadnezzar A.	5	5	8
11	(Singapore) Quek I. (Singapore) Loy M. Y.	11	11	11
(Turkmenistan) Allanazarov Y. (Turkmenistan) Ballyeva E.	3	3	3
(South Korea) Park Gy. (South Korea) Park Ga.	11	11	11
(Kuwait) Alkanderi M. (Kuwait) Abdulraheem M.	4	5	3
(Malaysia) Choong J. (Malaysia) Lyne K.	11	11	11

Round of 32
1	(Hong Kong) Wong C. T. (Hong Kong) Doo H.	11	11	11
(Iran) Faraji B. (Iran) Iloukhani S.	7	9	5
(Qatar) Abdulwahhab M. (Qatar) Mohamed A.	8	5	7
11	(Singapore) Quek I. (Singapore) Loy M. Y.	11	11	11
15	(Kazakhstan) Kharki I. (Kazakhstan) Mirkadirova S.	8	4	10
(South Korea) Park Gy. (South Korea) Park Ga.	11	11	12
(Malaysia) Choong J. (Malaysia) Lyne K.	w/o
7	(Japan) Togami S. (Japan) Hayata H.

Round of 16
1	(Hong Kong) Wong C. T. (Hong Kong) Doo H.	12	9	11	11
11	(Singapore) Quek I. (Singapore) Loy M. Y.	10	11	5	7
(South Korea) Park Gy. (South Korea) Park Ga.	11	11	11
(Malaysia) Choong J. (Malaysia) Lyne K.	4	7	8

Quarterfinals
1	(Hong Kong) Wong C. T. (Hong Kong) Doo H.	11	5	11	8	3
(South Korea) Park Gy. (South Korea) Park Ga.	8	11	6	11	11

==== Section 2 ====
Round of 64
(Uzbekistan) Iskandarov S. (Uzbekistan) Kamalova A.	11	11	7	6	11
(Macau) Zheng H. W. (Macau) Huang C. L.	6	6	11	11	6
(Chinese Taipei) Kuo G. H. (Chinese Taipei) Yeh Y. T.	11	11	11
(Mongolia) Tuvshinjargal U. (Mongolia) Tuvshinbayar E.	3	2	3
(Maldives) Ismail M. (Maldives) Nafiz A.	6	6	6
(Philippines) Misal J. R. (Philippines) Cruz K.	11	11	11
(Jordan) Abo Yaman Z. (Jordan) El-Hasani R.	10	11	11	11
(Tajikistan) Aliev M. (Tajikistan) Ismailova D.	12	9	4	7

Round of 32
6	(India) Jain P. (India) Das S.	11	11	11
(Uzbekistan) Iskandarov S. (Uzbekistan) Kamalova A.	1	9	8
(Chinese Taipei) Kuo G. H. (Chinese Taipei) Yeh Y. T.	11	11	11
16	(Bangladesh) Ahmed M. J. (Bangladesh) Sai K.	7	7	5
14	(Thailand) Preechayan T. (Thailand) Vijitviriyagul K.	11	11	13
(Philippines) Misal J. R. (Philippines) Cruz K.	8	2	11
(Jordan) Abo Yaman Z. (Jordan) El-Hasani R.	4	5	1
3	(China) Huang Y. (China) Chen Y.	11	11	11

Round of 16
6	(India) Jain P. (India) Das S.	12	11	11
(Chinese Taipei) Kuo G. H. (Chinese Taipei) Yeh Y. T.	10	9	2
14	(Thailand) Preechayan T. (Thailand) Vijitviriyagul K.	9	11	7	10
3	(China) Huang Y. (China) Chen Y.	11	9	11	12

Quarterfinals
6	(India) Jain P. (India) Das S.	3	9	3
3	(China) Huang Y. (China) Chen Y.	11	11	11

=== Bottom Half ===
==== Section 3 ====
Round of 64
(Jordan) Aldmaisy Z. (Jordan) Sadaqa Z.	4	9	3
(Indonesia) Negara M. (Indonesia) Rasmi C.	11	11	11
(Maldives) Muhammad I. (Maldives) Ibrahim M.	4	4	5
(Mongolia) Buyan T. (Mongolia) Batmunkh B.	11	11	11
(Sri Lanka) Silva S. (Sri Lanka) Bandara B.	14	8	5	9
(Thailand) Tancharoen S. (Thailand) Sawettabut J.	12	11	11	11
(Kazakhstan) Kenzhigulov A. (Kazakhstan) Akasheva Z.	w/o
(Bangladesh) Ridoy M. (Bangladesh) Mou S.

Round of 32
4	(India) Desai H. (India) Ghorpade Y.	14	12	11
(Indonesia) Negara M. (Indonesia) Rasmi C.	12	10	7
(Mongolia) Buyan T. (Mongolia) Batmunkh B.	8	5	5
12	(Chinese Taipei) Hsu H. C. (Chinese Taipei) Wu Y. S.	11	11	11
13	(Singapore) Pang K. (Singapore) Ser L. Q.	11	12	14
(Thailand) Tancharoen S. (Thailand) Sawettabut J.	6	10	12
(Kazakhstan) Kenzhigulov A. (Kazakhstan) Akasheva Z.	3	11	8	6
8	(South Korea) Park G. (South Korea) Lee D.	11	8	11	11

Round of 16
4	(India) Desai H. (India) Ghorpade Y.	11	12	11	11
12	(Chinese Taipei) Hsu H. C. (Chinese Taipei) Wu Y. S.	6	10	13	7
13	(Singapore) Pang K. (Singapore) Ser L. Q.	8	8	9
8	(South Korea) Park G. (South Korea) Lee D.	11	11	11

Quarterfinals
4	(India) Desai H. (India) Ghorpade Y.	11	8	8	11	11
8	(South Korea) Park G. (South Korea) Lee D.	6	11	11	9	9

==== Section 4 ====
Round of 64
(Kyrgyzstan) Iakupbaev A. (Kyrgyzstan) Abdimitalipova R.	11	13	11
(Iran) Ghaffari A. (Iran) Ashtari M.	5	11	9
(Saudi Arabia) Al Taher A. (Saudi Arabia) Alqahtani N.
(Philippines) Yamson E. (Philippines) Santillan C.	w/o
(Uzbekistan) Dilshodov D. (Uzbekistan) Khasanova A.	11	11	11
(Tajikistan) Abdukodirov A. (Tajikistan) Samadova M.	4	6	5
(Kuwait) Almkeemy A. (Kuwait) Alshammari M.	6	6	10
(Macau) Mak T. I. (Macau) Seak H. L.	11	11	12

Round of 32
5	(Hong Kong) Yiu K. T. (Hong Kong) Ng W. L.	11	11	11
(Kyrgyzstan) Iakupbaev A. (Kyrgyzstan) Abdimitalipova R.	3	6	4
(Philippines) Yamson E. (Philippines) Santillan C.	2	4	8
9	(China) Yuan L. (China) Wang Y.	11	11	11
10	(Malaysia) Yap R. Z. (Malaysia) Tee A. X.	11	9	7	11	10
(Uzbekistan) Dilshodov D. (Uzbekistan) Khasanova A.	9	11	11	7	12
(Macau) Mak T. I. (Macau) Seak H. L.	3	8	6
2	(Japan) Matsushima S. (Japan) Harimoto M.	11	11	11

Round of 16
5	(Hong Kong) Yiu K. T. (Hong Kong) Ng W. L.	6	5	9
9	(China) Yuan L. (China) Wang Y.	11	11	11
(Uzbekistan) Dilshodov D. (Uzbekistan) Khasanova A.	5	5	6
2	(Japan) Matsushima S. (Japan) Harimoto M.	11	11	11

Quarterfinals
9	(China) Yuan L. (China) Wang Y.	11	9	6	4
2	(Japan) Matsushima S. (Japan) Harimoto M.	7	11	11	11

== Qualification Playoff (Round of 16 Losers) ==
=== Match 1 ===
Position 9-16 (Loser will move forward to 13-16 position bracket)
(Singapore) Quek I. (Singapore) Loy M. Y.	7	7	11	10
(Malaysia) Choong J. (Malaysia) Lyne K.	11	11	6	12

=== Match 2 ===
Position 9-16 (Loser will move forward to 13-16 position bracket)
(Chinese Taipei) Kuo G. H. (Chinese Taipei) Yeh Y. T.	11	11	8	11
(Thailand) Preechayan T. (Thailand) Vijitviriyagul K.	8	5	11	7

=== Match 3 ===
Position 9-16 (Loser will move forward to 13-16 position bracket)
(Chinese Taipei) Hsu H. C. (Chinese Taipei) Wu Y. S.	5	8	6
(Singapore) Pang K. (Singapore) Ser L. Q.	11	11	11

=== Match 4 ===
Position 9-16 (Loser will move forward to 13-16 position bracket)
(Hong Kong) Yiu K. T. (Hong Kong) Ng W. L.	12	11	11
(Uzbekistan) Dilshodov D. (Uzbekistan) Khasanova A.	10	9	7

=== 13-16th position matches ===
13-16th Match 1 (Loser in Qualification Play-off Match 1-4 will be randomly placed in this bracket)
(Singapore) Quek I. (Singapore) Loy M. Y.	13	13	11
(Thailand) Preechayan T. (Thailand) Vijitviriyagul K.	11	11	4

13-16th Match 2 (Loser in Qualification Play-off Match 1-4 will be randomly placed in this bracket)
(Chinese Taipei) Hsu H. C. (Chinese Taipei) Wu Y. S.	11	11	11
(Uzbekistan) Dilshodov D. (Uzbekistan) Khasanova A.	8	8	1
