= 2024 Asian Table Tennis Championships – Women's team =

Women's team at the 2024 Asian Table Tennis Championships
- Venue: Daulet Sport Complex
- Date: 7–13 October 2024

The women's team in table tennis at the 2024 Asian Table Tennis Championships was held at Daulet Sport Complex from 7 to 13 October 2024.

== Format ==
All matches in the team events were played as a best-of-five series of individual matches, with the following order of play:

Match 1	Match 2	Match 3	Match 4	Match 5
A vs X	B vs Y	C vs Z	A vs Y	B vs X

The team events were divided into two divisions:

=== 1st Division ===
- All teams excluding the top 6 from the 2023 edition competed in the 1st Division.
- Teams were divided into groups of 3 or 4.
- The winners of each group advanced to a progressive knock-out stage to decide the top two teams.
- The remaining teams played additional matches in a progressive knock-out format to determine final placings.

=== Champion Division ===
- It consisted of:
  - The top 6 teams from the 2023 edition.
  - The top 2 teams from the 1st Division.
- Play began directly in a progressive knock-out format to determine the final positions and the champions.

== Seeding ==
The seeding was based on the final ranking at the 2023 edition.

=== Teams directly qualify to Champions Division ===
Seed	Team	Qualification
1	China	2023 Champion
2	South Korea	2023 Runner-up
3	Hong Kong, China	2023 Semi-finalist
4	Japan	2023 Semi-finalist
5	Thailand	2023 Winner of 5th/6th place
6	India	2023 Loser of 5th/6th place

=== Teams playing in First Division ===
Seed	Team
7	Singapore (Q)
8	Kazakhstan
9	Iran
10	Uzbekistan
11	Chinese Taipei
12	Sri Lanka
13	Mongolia
14	Malaysia
15	Pakistan
16	(North Korea) DPR Korea (Q)
17	Maldives
18	Philippines
19	Jordan
20	Kyrgyzstan

Q: Teams Qualified to Champions Division

== First division ==
=== Group 1 ===
Pos	Team	Pld	W	L	Pts	Promotion	SGP	MAS	PAK
1	Singapore	2	2	0	4	Promote to First Division semifinals	—	3–1	3–0
2	Malaysia	2	1	1	3		1–3	—	3–0
3	Pakistan	2	0	2	2		0–3	0–3	—

Source: ITTF

=== Group 2 ===
Pos	Team	Pld	W	L	Pts	Promotion	PRK	KAZ	MGL
1	North Korea	2	2	0	4	Promote to First Division semifinals	—	3–0	3–0
2	Kazakhstan	2	1	1	3		0–3	—	3–1
3	Mongolia	2	0	2	2		0–3	1–3	—

Source: ITTF

=== Group 3 ===
Pos	Team	Pld	W	L	Pts	Promotion	PHI	IRI	SRI	JOR
1	Philippines	3	3	0	6	Promote to First Division semifinals	—	3–1	3–0	3–0
2	Iran	3	2	1	5		1–3	—	3–0	3–0
3	Sri Lanka	3	1	2	4		0–3	0–3	—	3–0
4	Jordan	3	0	3	3		0–3	0–3	0–3	—

Source: ITTF

=== Group 4 ===
Pos	Team	Pld	W	L	Pts	Promotion	TPE	UZB	MDV	KGZ
1	Chinese Taipei	3	3	0	6	Promote to First Division semifinals	—	3–0	3–0	3–0
2	Uzbekistan	3	2	1	5		0–3	—	3–1	3–0
3	Maldives	3	1	2	4		0–3	1–3	—	3–1
4	Kyrgyzstan	3	0	3	3		0–3	0–3	1–3	—

Source: ITTF

=== Knockout Stage ===
Semifinals
7	Singapore	3
18	Philippines	0
11	Chinese Taipei	1
16	North Korea	3

Advanced to Champions Division
7	Singapore	Q
16	North Korea	Q

=== Main bracket ===
Source: ITTF

Quarterfinals
1	China	3
16	North Korea	1
5	Thailand	0
3	Hong Kong	3
4	Japan	3
7	Singapore	0
6	India	3
2	South Korea	2

Semifinals
1	China	3
3	Hong Kong	0
4	Japan	3
6	India	1

Finals
1	China	1
4	Japan	3
