= Arup Basak =

Indian table tennis coach

Arup Basak (born 3 December 1973) is a former Indian professional table tennis player and Indian coach from West Bengal. He played for India and also captained the Indian team. In 2019, he received the Dhyan Chand Award.

== Early life and career ==
Basak was born in Calcutta, now Kolkata, in West Bengal. His late father, Rameswar Basak, was employed with Tyre Corporation of India and his mother's name is Chitra Basak. He has two elder sisters. He works with Hindustan Petroleum Corporation Limited as a sports officer. His daughter Anannya Basak is also a table tennis player.

== Career ==
Basak started playing for the Bengal junior team in late eighties. On 19 January 1994, he won the National Table Tennis Championship for 1993, that was held in 1994. Earlier, he won the National Games crown in 1993 and also the South Asian Games, also in 1993. In October 2000, he became the men's singles top seed in India. In August 2000, he also won the India Cup table tennis tournament in Chandigarh. In 2005, he won the Kalyan Jayant memorial table tennis championships in Kolkata. He later turned to coaching and started coaching Indian teams from 2012. He was one of the Indian coaches to the World Championship teams five times, in 2012, 2015, 2016, 2018 and 2019.

He coached the Ultimate Table Tennis team Maharashtra United in the inaugural league.

== Awards ==
- In 2015, he received the Banglar Gourav Award from Bengal government.
- in 2019, he received Dhyan Chand Award.
