= St. Mary's College, Hyderabad =

Undergraduate college in Hyderabad, India

- సేయింట్ మేరీస్ కాలేజ్
- The future begins here
- Type: Undergraduate College
- Established: 1995 (as junior college); 2002 (as UG college)
- Founder: Mr B. Arogya Reddy
- Parent institution: St Mary's Educational Society, Hyderabad
- Academic affiliations: Osmania University
- Chairman: Mr B Arogya Reddy
- Principal: Dr Jaimole Cross
- Dean: Mr. B. Mahender Reddy
- Director: Prof J Mathew George
- Head, IQAC: Dr. Maithry Shinde
- Academic staff: 80
- Administrative staff: 50
- Students: 1600
- Location: 8-3-229 Near Yousufguda Check Post, Yousufguda, Hyderabad, Telangana, 500045, India
- Campus: Non-residential, co-educational
- Language: English
- Website: www.stmaryscollege.in

St. Mary's College, Hyderabad is an undergraduate co-educational college in India offering BA/BBA/BCom/BSc programmes of the Osmania University and several certificate courses of its own. It is located in Yousufguda, which is in Khairatabad Mandal of Hyderabad District, Telangana State.

== History ==
St. Mary's College has its origins in the establishment of St. Mary's Junior College at Himayatnagar in Hyderabad, India in 1982. Subsequently, the junior college was shifted to its present premises at Basheer Bagh and soon became an institution of choice for many in Hyderabad. In 1995, a second campus of the Junior College opened at Yousufguda in Hyderabad, which became an undergraduate college in 2002. St. Mary's College at Yousufguda is now one of the most sought after co-educational undergraduate colleges in the region.

St. Mary's College, Hyderabad is one of the several institutions run by the St. Mary's Educational Society, Hyderabad. The founder of the group is Mr B. Arogya Reddy, who was the first Principal of St. Mary's Junior College at Himayatnagar, Hyderabad. He is currently the chairman of the society. Mr B. Mahender Reddy heads the Group of St Mary's Institutions currently as its chief executive officer. He was the first Principal of St. Mary's College, Hyderabad. Prof J Mathew George is the director and Dr Jaimole Cross is the current Principal of the college.

== About the college ==
St. Mary's College, Hyderabad is affiliated to the Osmania University and is accredited by the National Assessment and Accreditation Council. The college has collaborative agreements with the Budapest Metropolitan University, California Baptist University, Beijing Information Science & Technology University, St. Mary's University, Texas, Red River College, the Chartered Institute for Securities & Investment and with companies such as Amazon (company) and Cognizant.

The city campus located at Tahir Ville in Yousufguda has a basketball court and a volleyball court as play area. The campus also houses various laboratories in Life Sciences, Chemistry, Electronics, Computer Science and Mass Communication.

The college is organised into five major academic departments: English & Languages, Business Management, Commerce, Sciences, and Social Sciences & Humanities. Each of these departments are led by a head of the department. The college also have a head for corporate relations and a head for student activities and alumni relations. Mr T Joseph Christadoss, head, Department of Social Sciences & Communication, was awarded the Telangana State Award for Teachers in September 2017.

The college's Student Information System and online administration are powered by Fedena. The college has its own learning portal built on Moodle for e-learning. These platforms allow for effective blended learning strategies involving offline and online courses.

Library is maintaining a blog namely oursmclibrary covers all previous question papers, library activities etc.

== Students and alumni ==
A number of famous Hyderabadis such as Ram Charan, Ambati Prudhvi Reddy, N. T. Rama Rao Jr., Sania Mirza, Ashwini Ponnappa, Pawan Kalyan, Swathi Reddy, Naga Chaitanya, Sai Dharam Tej, Varun Tej, Niharika Konidela, Vaisshnav Tej, Vishwak Sen, Rajive Dhavan, Rana Daggubati, Naina Jaiswal, Aruna Budda Reddy and Heroshini Komali have studied in this institution. Many celebrities and political leaders have their children studying in St Mary's College. Over two hundred international students registered through the Osmania University Foreign Relations Office also study here.

St Mary's College is known for its thrust on student activities and student leadership. The student council of the college provides leadership to the student initiatives on campus. Student clubs, some focusing on co-curricular activities and some on extra-curricular activities, thrive on campus, and organise competitive and non-competitive events round the year. There are fifteen student clubs on campus. In addition, the National Service Scheme also has its unit on campus.
