= Diya Chitale =

Indian table tennis player (born 2003)

Personal information
- Born: 2 April 2003 (age 23) Mumbai, Maharashtra, India

Sport
- Sport: Table tennis
- League: Ultimate Table Tennis
- Club: Dabang Delhi TTC
- Team: Reserve Bank of India
Medal record
Women's table tennis
Representing India
Asian Games
Bronze medal – third place	2026 Aichi–Nagoya	Mixed doubles

Diya Chitale (born 2 April 2003) is an Indian table tennis player . She won her maiden National championship in 2025. She plays for Dabang Delhi in the Ultimate Table Tennis league. She represents Reserve Bank of India (RBI) in the domestic events. Along with Manush Shah, the duo became the first Indian pair to qualify for World Table Tennis (WTT) Finals.

== Career ==
Chitale took table tennis seriously only after she won a silver medal at the Under 12 Nationals. By 2015, she is fully focused and won both the girl's Under 15 singles and doubles National championship. In 2019, she won the Under 18 and Under 21 girl's singles championship in the Junior and Youth National Championships. In 2019, she also won the singles and doubles in the Girls' Under 18 event at the Ghana Junior and Cadet Open. In 2020, she retained the Under 21 Girls' title at the Junior and Youth National Championship. In 2022, she won the Under 19 Girls' singles WTT Youth Contender at Lima.

In 2023, she won her first Senior National title as she clinched the doubles championship. In 2024, she won the mixed doubles at the WTT Feeder at Beirut. In 2025, she won the mixed doubles in the WTT at Tunis along with her partner Manush Shah. The pair also became the first Indian players to qualify for the WTT finals.

In 2025, she was UTT's most expensive player, as she was retained by Dabang Delhi for Rs 14.1 lakh. In 2023, she played for U Mumba in her first season.

In 2026, she won the mixed doubles event in the World Table Tennis (WTT) Contender at Muscat.

In 2026, Chitale and Manush Shah won the bronze medal in the mixed doubles event at the 2026 Asian Games in Aichi–Nagoya, Japan.

== Finals ==
=== Mixed doubles ===
Result	Year	Tournament	Partner	Opponent	Score	Ref
Winner	2026	WTT Contender Lagos	(India) Manush Shah	(France) Leo De Nodrest / Camille Lutz	3–0	
