= 2023 Asian Table Tennis Championships – Women's team =

Women's team at the 2023 Asian Table Tennis Championships
- Venue: Yongpyong Dome
- Date: 3–5 September 2023
- Competitors: 72 from 18 nations

The women's team in table tennis at the 2023 Asian Table Tennis Championships was held at Yongpyong Dome from 3 to 5 September 2023.

== Schedule ==
All times are Korea Standard Time (UTC+09:00)

Date	Time	Round
Sunday, 3 September 2023	10:00; 12:00	Group R1
Sunday, 3 September 2023	14:00; 16:00	Group R2
Sunday, 3 September 2023	18:00	Group R3
Monday, 4 September 2023	10:00	Group winners
Monday, 4 September 2023	10:00	Quarterfinals
Monday, 4 September 2023	10:00	11–14 semifinals
Monday, 4 September 2023	15:00	Quarterfinals
Monday, 4 September 2023	15:00	9–10 final
Monday, 4 September 2023	15:00	11–12 final
Monday, 4 September 2023	15:00	13–14 final
Monday, 4 September 2023	15:00	15–16 final
Tuesday, 5 September 2023	10:00	Semifinals
Tuesday, 5 September 2023	10:00	5–8 semifinals
Tuesday, 5 September 2023	14:00	5–6 final
Tuesday, 5 September 2023	14:00	7–8 final
Tuesday, 5 September 2023	19:00	Final

== Format ==
Teams were made up of three players(Some teams also had an additional player as a back up). Each team match was made up of five individual matches and ended when either side has won three matches. The order of a team match was as follows: a doubles match, two singles matches, and if neither side had won three matches by this point, a maximum of two extra singles matches were played.

== First division ==
=== Group 1 ===
Pos	Team	Pld	W	L	Pts	Promotion	CHN	TPE	MAS
1	China	2	2	0	4	Promote to First Division semifinals	—	3–0	3–0
2	Chinese Taipei	2	1	1	3		0–3	—	3–0
3	Malaysia	2	0	2	2		0–3	0–3	—

Source: ITTF

=== Group 2 ===
Pos	Team	Pld	W	L	Pts	Promotion	KAZ	BAN	PAK
1	Kazakhstan	2	2	0	4	Promote to First Division semifinals	—	3–0	3–0
2	Bangladesh	2	1	1	3		0–3	—	3–0
3	Pakistan	2	0	2	2		0–3	0–3	—

Source: ITTF

=== Group 3 ===
Pos	Team	Pld	W	L	Pts	Promotion	IRI	MGL	LAO
1	Iran	2	2	0	4	Promote to First Division quarterfinals	—	3–0	3–0
2	Mongolia	2	1	1	3		0–3	—	3–0
3	Laos	2	0	2	2		0–3	0–3	—

Source: ITTF

=== Group 4 ===
Pos	Team	Pld	W	L	Pts	Promotion	UZB	SRI	PHI
1	Uzbekistan	2	2	0	4	Promote to First Division quarterfinals	—	3–0	3–0
2	Sri Lanka	2	1	1	3		0–3	—	3–0
3	Philippines	2	0	2	2		0–3	0–3	—

Source: ITTF

=== Main bracket ===
Group winners
China	3
Iran	0
Kazakhstan	3
Uzbekistan	0

Finals
Kazakhstan
China
9th place
Iran	3
Uzbekistan	2

=== 11th place bracket ===
11th-14th place
Bangladesh	1
Sri Lanka	3
Mongolia	0
Chinese Taipei	3

11th place
Sri Lanka	0
Chinese Taipei	3
13th place
Bangladesh	0
Mongolia	3

=== 15th place bracket ===
15th-18th place
Malaysia	Bye
Pakistan	Bye

15th place
Malaysia	3
Pakistan	0

== Champion division ==
=== Main bracket ===
Source: ITTF

Quarterfinals
Japan	3
India	0
China	3
Singapore	0
Hong Kong	3
Kazakhstan	1
Thailand	0
South Korea	3

Semifinals
Japan	0
China	3
Hong Kong	0
South Korea	3

Finals
China	3
South Korea	0

=== 5th place bracket ===
5th-8th place
India	3
Singapore	2
Kazakhstan	0
Thailand	3

5th place
India	0
Thailand	3
7th place
Singapore	3
Kazakhstan	1
