= Zoltán Bátorfi =

Hungarian table tennis player

Personal information
- Nationality: Hungarian
- Born: 20 July 1975 (age 49); Szombathely, Hungary

Sport
- Sport: Table tennis

Zoltán Bátorfi (born 20 July 1975) is a Hungarian table tennis player. He competed in the men's singles event at the 1996 Summer Olympics.
