= Miwa Harimoto =

Japanese table tennis player (born 2008)

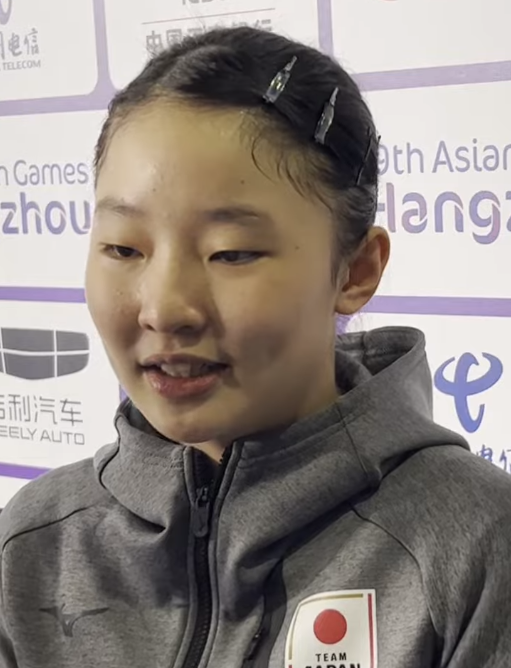
- Harimoto in 2023

Personal information
- Native name: 張本美和
- Nationality: China (before 2014); Japan (after 2014)
- Born: Zhang Meihe (张美和); 16 June 2008 (age 18) Sendai, Japan
- Height: 1.66 m (5 ft 5 in)

Sport
- Sport: Table tennis
- Club: Kinoshita Abyell Kanagawa (T.League)
- Playing style: Right-handed shakehand grip
- Highest ranking: 3 (11 May 2026)
- Current ranking: 3 (28 September 2026)
Medal record
Women's table tennis
Representing Japan
Olympic Games
Silver medal – second place	2024 Paris	Team
World Championships
Silver medal – second place	2024 Busan	Team
Silver medal – second place	2026 London	Team
Bronze medal – third place	2025 Doha	Doubles
World Cup
Silver medal – second place	2025 Chengdu	Mixed team
Bronze medal – third place	2023 Chengdu	Mixed team
Bronze medal – third place	2024 Macao	Singles
Asian Games
Silver medal – second place	2022 Hangzhou	Team
Silver medal – second place	2026 Aichi-Nagoya	Doubles
Silver medal – second place	2026 Aichi-Nagoya	Team
Bronze medal – third place	2022 Hangzhou	Doubles
Bronze medal – third place	2026 Aichi-Nagoya	Singles
Asian Championships
Gold medal – first place	2024 Astana	Team
Gold medal – first place	2026 Tashkent	Mixed doubles
Gold medal – first place	2026 Tashkent	Team
Silver medal – second place	2024 Astana	Singles
Silver medal – second place	2024 Astana	Doubles
Silver medal – second place	2025 Bhubaneswar	Team
Silver medal – second place	2026 Tashkent	Singles
Silver medal – second place	2026 Tashkent	Doubles
Bronze medal – third place	2023 Pyeongchang	Doubles
Bronze medal – third place	2023 Pyeongchang	Team

Miwa Harimoto (張本 美和, Harimoto Miwa; born 16 June 2008) is a Japanese table tennis player.

== Personal life ==
Miwa Harimoto was born Zhang Meihe (Note: Chinese: 张美和; pinyin: Zhāng Měihé) in Sendai, to parents of Chinese descent. Her father, Yu Harimoto (born Zhang Yu), (Note: Japanese: 張本 宇, romanized: Harimoto Yū. Born as Zhang Yu (Chinese: 张宇; pinyin: Zhāng Yǔ).) and mother, Rin Harimoto (born Zhang Ling) (Note: Japanese: 張本 凌, romanized: Harimoto Rin. Born as Zhang Ling (Chinese: 张凌; pinyin: Zhāng Líng)) are both former professional table tennis players from Sichuan, China. Rin Harimoto, at the peak of her career, represented the Chinese national team at the 1995 World Table Tennis Championships in Tianjin. Miwa's parents moved from China to Japan in 1998. She and her older brother Tomokazu (born Zhang Zhihe) were both taught to play table tennis by their parents from a young age with the intention of pursuing professional careers.

In 2014, at the age of five, she became a Japanese citizen alongside her father and brother, and changed her name from Zhang Meihe to Miwa Harimoto. (Note: In kanji form, her old surname 張 (simp: 张) is added 本, become to 張本 and changed to Japanese reading as Harimoto. Her given name in kanji 美和 is kept but changed reading from Mandarin as Meihe to Japanese as Miwa.) Her mother was later naturalized in 2021.

== Career ==
She won the 2021 Youth Championships in U-15 singles, women's doubles, mixed doubles, and team events. She remained undefeated throughout.

At the 2022 Asian Games in Hangzhou, she won two medals. She was the third player on the Japanese team, losing in the final against China. With Miyuu Kihara, they notably eliminated the Chinese pair Wang Manyu/Sun Yingsha in the quarter-final. They finally brought home a bronze medal.

In 2024, Harimoto was picked for the Japanese national team as the third women's team event member at the Summer Olympics. She won bronze in women's singles at the 2024 ITTF World Cup. In October, Harimoto defeated Wang Yidi and Sun Yingsha in the women's team final at the 2024 Asian Championships, helping the Japanese team clinch the women's team title.

== Singles titles ==
Year	Tournament	Final opponent	Score	Ref
2023	WTT Feeder Antalya	(Japan) Minami Ando	3–2	
2023	WTT Contender Tunis	(South Korea) Shin Yu-bin	4–2	
2024	WTT Contender Tunis	(Japan) Satsuki Odo	4–0	
2025	WTT Star Contender Chennai	(Japan) Honoka Hashimoto	4–2	
2025	WTT Contender Tunis	(Japan) Hina Hayata	4–1	
2025	WTT Contender Buenos Aires	(Chinese Taipei) Cheng I-ching	4–2	
2025	WTT Star Contender Foz do Iguaçu	(Japan) Miyu Nagasaki	4–2	
2025	WTT Star Contender London	(Japan) Hina Hayata	4–3	
2026	WTT Champions Chongqing	(China) Kuai Man	4–3	
2026	WTT Contender Zagreb	(Macau) Zhu Yuling	4–3	
2026	WTT Champions Yokohama	(China) Chen Xingtong	4–2	
2026	WTT Champions Macao	(China) Chen Yi	4–3	
