= Dabang Delhi TTC =

Professional table tennis franchise

- Full name: Dabang Delhi Table Tennis Club
- Short name: DDTTC
- Sport: Table Tennis
- Founded: 2017
- League: Ultimate Table Tennis
- Location: New Delhi
- Owner: DoIt Sports Management
- CEO: Radha Kapoor
- Head coach: Vesna Ojsteršek
- Championships: 1 (2018)

Dabang Delhi TTC, previously known as Dabang Smashers, is an Indian professional table tennis franchise based in New Delhi that plays in Ultimate Table Tennis. Established in 2017, the team were the champions in the 2018 season.

== Squad ==
=== 2019 ===
Squad
Female	Male
(India) Krittwika Sinha Roy (India) Naina Jaiswal (Romania) Bernadette Szocs	(India) Parth Virmani (India) Sathiyan Gnanasekaran (Sweden) Jon Persson

== Honours ==
=== Domestic ===
- Ultimate Table Tennis

Winners (1): 2018
