= Bernadette Szőcs =

Romanian table tennis player

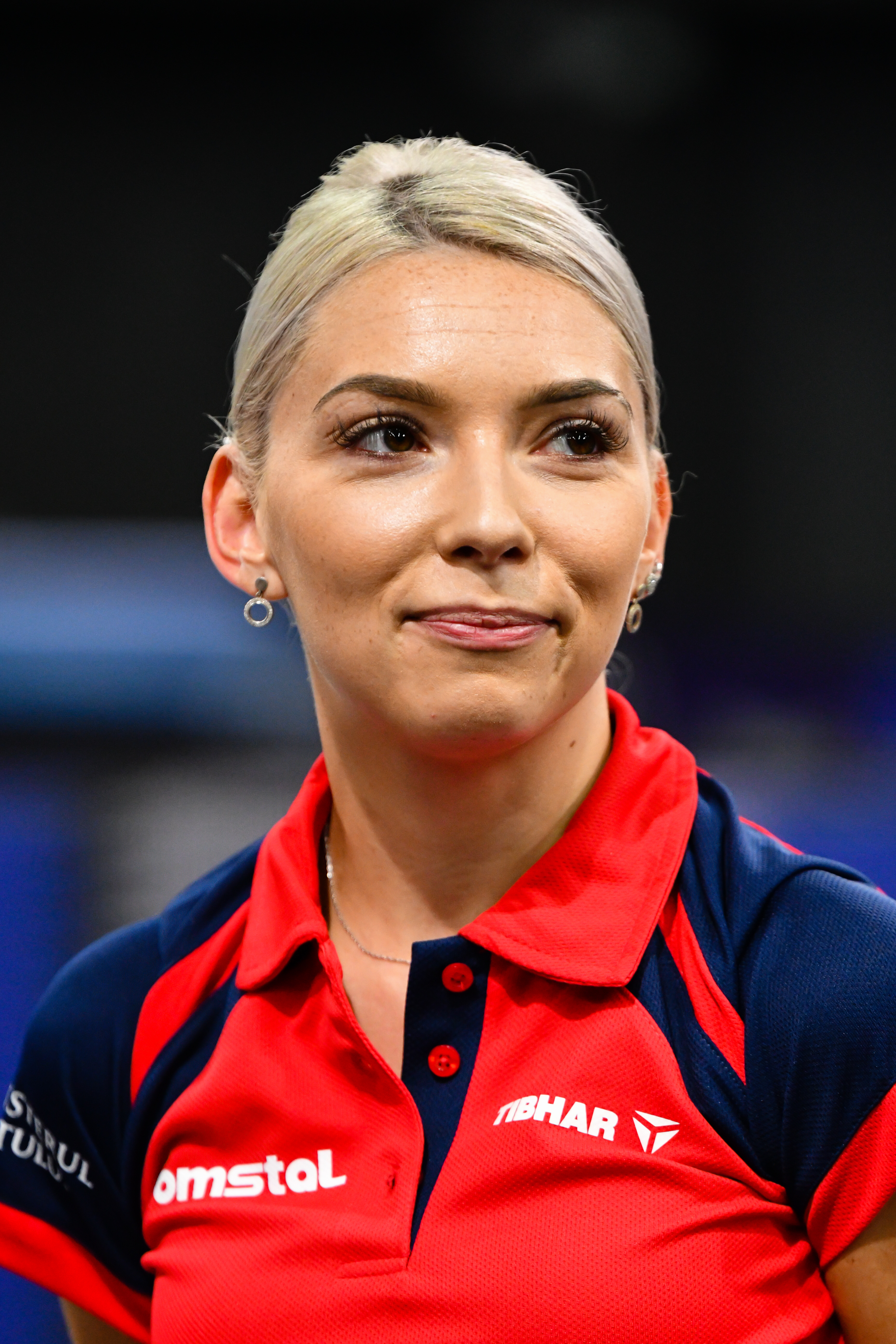
- Szőcs at the 2022 European Championships

Personal information
- Full name: Bernadette Cynthia Szőcs
- Nickname: Bernie
- Born: 5 March 1995 (age 31) Târgu Mureș, Romania
- Height: 1.59 m (5 ft 3 in)
- Weight: 48 kg (106 lb)

Sport
- Sport: Table tennis
- Club: Ahmedabad SG Pipers; (2024–present); Dabang Delhi TTC; (2019); Falcons TTC; (2018)
- Equipment: Tibhar
- Highest ranking: 8 (16 April 2024)
- Current ranking: 23 (28 September 2026)
Medal record
Women's table tennis
Representing Romania
World Championships
Silver medal – second place	2025 Doha	Doubles
Bronze medal – third place	2026 London	Team
European Games
Gold medal – first place	2023 Kraków–Małopolska	Singles
Gold medal – first place	2023 Kraków–Małopolska	Team
Silver medal – second place	2019 Minsk	Mixed doubles
Silver medal – second place	2019 Minsk	Team
Bronze medal – third place	2023 Kraków–Małopolska	Mixed doubles
European Championships
Gold medal – first place	2017 Luxembourg	Team
Gold medal – first place	2019 Nantes	Team
Gold medal – first place	2022 Munich	Doubles
Silver medal – second place	2011 Gdańsk–Sopot	Team
Silver medal – second place	2013 Schwechat	Team
Silver medal – second place	2015 Yekaterinburg	Team
Silver medal – second place	2022 Munich	Mixed doubles
Silver medal – second place	2023 Malmö	Team
Silver medal – second place	2024 Linz	Singles
Silver medal – second place	2024 Linz	Doubles
Silver medal – second place	2025 Zadar	Team
Bronze medal – third place	2012 Buzău	Mixed doubles
Bronze medal – third place	2016 Budapest	Mixed doubles
Bronze medal – third place	2026 Ljubljana	Doubles
Bronze medal – third place	2026 Ljubljana	Mixed doubles
Europe Top-16
Gold medal – first place	2018 Montreux	Singles
Silver medal – second place	2019 Montreux	Singles
Silver medal – second place	2026 Montreux	Singles
Bronze medal – third place	2021 Thessaloniki	Singles
Bronze medal – third place	2022 Montreux	Singles
Bronze medal – third place	2024 Montreux	Singles
Universiade
Bronze medal – third place	2015 Gwangju	Singles
Bronze medal – third place	2017 Taipei	Singles
World Junior Championships
Bronze medal – third place	2011 Manama	Doubles
Bronze medal – third place	2012 Hyderabad	Doubles
Bronze medal – third place	2013 Rabat	Team
European Youth Championships
Gold medal – first place	2011 Kazan	Singles
Gold medal – first place	2011 Kazan	Doubles
Gold medal – first place	2012 Schwechat	Singles
Gold medal – first place	2012 Schwechat	Doubles
Gold medal – first place	2012 Schwechat	Team
Gold medal – first place	2013 Ostrava	Team
Silver medal – second place	2011 Kazan	Team
Bronze medal – third place	2013 Ostrava	Singles
Bronze medal – third place	2013 Ostrava	Doubles
Gold medal – first place	2008 Terni	Team
Gold medal – first place	2009 Prague	Doubles
Gold medal – first place	2010 Istanbul	Team
Gold medal – first place	2010 Istanbul	Singles
Gold medal – first place	2010 Istanbul	Doubles
Silver medal – second place	2006 Sarajevo	Team
Silver medal – second place	2007 Bratislava	Doubles
Silver medal – second place	2008 Terni	Singles
Silver medal – second place	2008 Terni	Mixed doubles
Bronze medal – third place	2006 Sarajevo	Mixed doubles
Bronze medal – third place	2007 Bratislava	Team
Bronze medal – third place	2008 Terni	Doubles
Bronze medal – third place	2009 Prague	Singles
Europe Youth Top-10
Gold medal – first place	2009 Rotterdam	Cadet singles
Gold medal – first place	2010 Topoľčany	Cadet singles
Gold medal – first place	2012 Buzău	Junior singles
Gold medal – first place	2013 Terni	Junior singles

Bernadette Cynthia Szőcs (Hungarian: [søːt͡ʃ], born 5 March 1995) is a Romanian professional table tennis player of Hungarian ethnicity.

She is the incumbent European games champion in women's singles and a three time Olympian, having participated in 2016, 2020 and 2024 editions of summer Olympics.

In April 2024, she reached a career-high singles ranking of world No. 8 by ITTF/WTT.

== Career ==
In September 2011, she travelled to Argentina for the World Junior Circuit event where she overtook Kasumi Ishikawa to reach the top spot in the competition series.

In July 2012, she was ranked 5th in the ITTF World Junior Circuit.

Szőcs won the singles event in the inaugural season of T2, beating Feng Tianwei in the final. Bernadette started to play Table Tennis at 9 years of age for CS Gloria Bistrița-Năsăud. She was declared the 68th honorary citizen of Bistrița in 2018. She was suspended in 2017 and signed with CSA Steaua București in 2019.

Szőcs played for Dabangg Delhi TTC in Ultimate table tennis, a table tennis league in India.

In August 2019 she was ranked no. 14 in the world in the International Table Tennis Federation rankings and no. 1 in the European Table Tennis Union rankings, and in July in the T2 Diamond event, became the first player to use a coloured rubber – pink.

In Szőcs's first international match in 2021, Szőcs upset second seed and world ranked number 8 Cheng I-Ching in the round of 32 of the WTT Contender event at WTT Doha.

Service Controversies and On-Court Conduct

Bernadette Szocs is well-known for aggressive playing style and emotional presence on court. A recurring area of controversy surrounding Bernadette Szocs has been the legality and transparency of her service action, and her involvement in disputes regarding service legality and umpiring decisions. Her serve has attracted scrutiny from opponents, spectators, and officials, particularly during high-profile international competitions where service faults were called or reviewed. During Europe Smash Sweden 2026, Szocs and her coach openly disputed multiple service-related decisions made by the umpire during her match against Nina Mittelham, arguing that the officiating was excessively strict and inconsistent. Reports described visible frustration from both player and coach, with repeated challenges to the umpire's judgment throughout the contest.

Romania Team Celebration Controversy

Following the World Table Tennis Championships, members of the Romania Women's Team, including Bernadette Szocs, attracted attention after celebrating by climbing onto the table. The celebration drew criticism from some members of the table tennis community who viewed standing on the playing surface as disrespectful to the equipment and traditions of the sport.

== Personal life ==
Szőcs has an older brother, Hunor, who is also a table tennis player.

== Singles titles ==
Year	Tournament	Final opponent	Score	Ref
2017	ITTF Challenge, Brazil Open	(France) Audrey Zarif	4–0	
2018	Europe Top 16	(Netherlands) Li Jie	4–1	
2023	European Games	(Monaco) Xiaoxin Yang	4–3	

== Best results by type of tournament ==
=== Singles ===
Her best ranking in singles was No. 8 in the world, obtained in April 2024.

- European Table Tennis Championships: Silver medal (2024)
- European Games: Champion (2023)
- WTT Contender: Silver medal (Lima 2023)
- WTT Star Contender: Quarterfinals (Ljubljana 2023, Bangkok 2024)
- WTT Champions: Quarterfinals (Macao 2022, Frankfurt 2023, Macao 2023, Incheon 2024, Macao 2026)
- Grand Smash: Round of 16 (Singapore 2025)
- WTT Cup Finals: Bronze medal (Fukuoka 2024)
- Table Tennis World Cup: Round of 16 (Chengdu 2018, Chengdu 2019, Weihai 2020, Macau 2024, Macau 2025)
- World Table Tennis Championships: Round of 16 (Houston 2021, Doha 2025)
- Olympic Games: Round of 16 (Paris 2024)
