= Naina Jaiswal =

Indian table tennis player

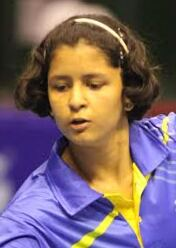
- Naina Jaiswa, 2014.
- Born: 22 March 2000 (age 26); Hyderabad, India

Naina Jaiswal (born on 22 March 2000) is an Indian table tennis player who won multiple titles in both national and international championships. She is also a "Child Prodigy" who started pursuing PhD at the age of 17.

== Early life ==
Born in Hyderabad to Ashwani Kumar Jaiswal and Bhagya Laxmi Jaiswal, Naina had completed her graduation at the age of 13 from St. Mary's College, Hyderabad. At the age of 15 she has completed her master's degree and at the age of 17 she began a PhD.

== Education ==
Naina Jaiswal completed her 10th grade at the age of 8, completed her Intermediate at the age of 10, completed her Graduate degree from St. Mary's College at the age of 13, completed her Post graduation from Osmania University at the age of 15 and currently she is pursuing her PhD. She is the youngest post-graduate from Asia.

== International titles ==
- First girl from India who selected for ITTF World Hopes Team – 2011
- Secured 6th position in the world (Austria) – 2011 (under-12)
- Cadet girls' team gold medalist in Indian open – 2011
- Cadet girls' singles bronze medalist in Indian open – 2011
- Cadet girls' team bronze medalist in Indian open – 2013
- Cadet girls' double bronze medalist in Indian open – 2013
- Cadet girls' team gold medalist in Fajr cup (Iran) 2013
- Cadet girls' doubles gold medalist in Fajr cup (Iran) 2013
- Cadet girls' singles bronze medalist in Fajr cup (Iran) 2013
- Participated in Hong Kong junior and cadet open 2011
- Participated in Asian junior championship (2011)

== National titles ==
- Present ranking – India's no. 1 (under 15)
- Cadet girls' singles National champion (gold medalist) 2010
- Cadet girls' team National champion (gold medalist) 2010
- Sub- junior girls team National champion (gold medalist) 2010, 2011, and 2012
- Junior girls' team National champion (gold medalist) 2010
- Sub-junior singles (bronze medalist) 2010
- Sub-junior doubles (silver medalist) 2011
- Youth girls' team (bronze medalist) 2011
- Junior girls' team (bronze medalist) 2012
- Youth girls' team (silver medalist) 2012
- Junior girls' doubles (silver medalist) 2012
- Sub-junior girls' team (bronze medalist) 2013
- Sub- junior girls' doubles (silver medalist) 2013
- Hat-trick winner of first national ranking tournaments (2011, 2012, 2013)
