= Yashaswini Ghorpade =

Indian table tennis player

Personal information
- National team: India
- Born: 23 October 2004 (age 22) Bengaluru, Karnataka, India

Sport
- Country: India
- Sport: Table Tennis
Medal record
Women's Table tennis
Representing India
Asian Championships
Bronze medal – third place	2026 Tashkent	Mixed doubles

Yashaswini Ghorpade (born 23 October 2004) is an Indian table tennis player from Karnataka, India. She won her maiden National championship at Indore on 21 March 2026. She represents the Petroleum Sports Promotion Board in domestic tournaments. She was selected for the Indian team for the Asian Championship along with Sreeja Akula and Ayhika after the Senior Nationals in 2026 at Indore.

== Early life ==
Ghorpade is from Bengaluru, Karnataka. She began playing table tennis in 2010 under coach Anshuman Roy. She trains at his facility, UTT Skies High Performance Centre in JP Nagar, Bengaluru.

== Career ==
Ghorpade won her first senior national women's title defeating her teammate Syndrela Das in a 4–3 final at the 87th Senior National and Inter-State Table Tennis Championship in Indore on 21 March 2026. On way to her final, she defeated top seed Sreeja Akula in the quarterfinals. She went into the tournament as the 8th seed but is ranked number 1 in the country after the victory.

Earlier, she won the national titles in both sub-junior (under 15) and junior (U 19) Nationals. She became the third player from Karnataka to win the National title after Archana Kamath (2019) and Usha Sunderraj (1968).

She won a bronze medal at the 2022 Youth World Championships in Rades, Tunisia in women's doubles. She won a bronze in the Junior mixed doubles at the Asian Youth Championship and was part of the Asian team that won a bronze at the World Cadet Challenge 2019 in the team category.

She was part of the Goa Challengers team that won the Ultimate Table Tennis (UTT).
