= Giorgia Piccolin =

Italian table tennis player (born 1996)

Personal information
- Nationality: Italian
- Born: 15 January 1996 (age 30)

Sport
- Sport: Table tennis
- Club: Ahmedabad SG Pipers
- Highest ranking: 56 (1 May 2024)
- Current ranking: 89 (15 July 2025)
Medal record
Women's table tennis
Representing Italy
Mediterranean Games
| Silver medal – second place | 2022 Oran | Team |
| Silver medal – second place | 2026 Taranto | Team |

Giorgia Piccolin (born 15 January 1996) is an Italian table tennis player. Her highest career ITTF ranking was 56, in May 2024.

She qualified for the 2024 Summer Olympics in the singles competition where she lost in the round of 64 to Miu Hirano.
