= Manush Shah =

Indian table tennis player

Personal information
- Full name: Manush Shah
- Nationality: Indian
- Born: India

Sport
- Sport: Table tennis
- Team: India
- Current ranking: 43 (MS); 3 (MD, with Manav Thakkar) (28 September 2026)
Medal record
Men's table tennis
Representing India
Asian Games
Bronze medal – third place	2026 Aichi–Nagoya	Mixed doubles

Manush Shah is an Indian table tennis player. Along with Diya Chitale, the duo became the first Indian pair to qualify for World Table Tennis (WTT) Finals.

In the mixed doubles event at the 2026 Asian Games in Aichi and Nagoya, Shah and Chitale defeated the World No. 4 pair of Wong Chun-ting and Doo Hoi Kem from Hong Kong in the quarter finals, assuring the Indian contingent of a medal.
