= List of ITTF World Youth Championships medalists =

List of ITTF World Youth Championships medalists contains ITTF World Youth Championships medalists in the boys' and girls' singles and doubles events. The champion(s) of the tournament win a gold medal, the runners-up take the silver medal, and both losing semifinalists are awarded bronze medals.

== Winners ==
=== Under-19 ===
Year	Team		Singles		Doubles		
Year	Boys'	Girls'	Boys'	Girls'	Boys'	Girls'	Mixed
2021	China	China	(China) Xiang Peng	(China) Kuai Man	(Russia) Maksim Grebnev (Russia) Vladimir Sidorenko	(China) Kuai Man (China) Wu Yangchen	(Japan) Miyuu Kihara (Japan) Hiroto Shinozuka
2022	China	China	(China) Lin Shidong	(Japan) Miyuu Kihara	(China) Lin Shidong (China) Chen Yuanyu	(Japan) Miyuu Kihara (Japan) Miwa Harimoto	(China) Lin Shidong (China) Kuai Man
2023	China	China	(China) Lin Shidong	(China) Kuai Man	(China) Lin Shidong (China) Wen Ruibo	(China) Kuai Man (China) Xu Yi	(China) Lin Shidong (China) Kuai Man
2024	China	South Korea	(China) Huang Youzheng	(Germany) Annett Kaufmann	(China) Wen Ruibo (China) Huang Youzheng	(China) Zong Geman (China) Qin Yuxuan	(China) Huang Youzheng (China) Zong Geman
2025	Japan	China	(Japan) Ryuusei Kawakami	(China) Qin Yuxuan	(Chinese Taipei) Kuo Guan-hong (Chinese Taipei) Hsu Hsien-chia	(Germany) Mia Griesel (Wales) Anna Hursey	(China) Li Hechen (China) Qin Yuxuan

=== Under-15 ===
Year	Team		Singles		Doubles		
Year	Boys'	Girls'	Boys'	Girls'	Boys'	Girls'	Mixed
2021	Russia	Japan	(Japan) Sora Matsushima	(Japan) Miwa Harimoto	(France) Félix Lebrun (Japan) Sora Matsushima	(Egypt) Hana Goda (Japan) Miwa Harimoto	(Japan) Miwa Harimoto (Japan) Sora Matsushima
2022	China	China	(France) Flavien Coton	(China) Yan Yutong	(Slovakia) Samuel Arpas (Hungary) Balazs Lei	(China) Xiang Junlin (China) Yan Yutong	(Kazakhstan) Alan Kurmangaliyev (Egypt) Hana Goda
2023	China	Japan	(China) Sun Yang	(Japan) Yuna Ojio	(Chinese Taipei) Kuo Guan-hong (Chinese Taipei) Hsu Hsien-chia	(Japan) Mao Takamori (Japan) Yuna Ojio	(Japan) Tamito Watanabe (Japan) Yuna Ojio
2024	China	China	(China) Li Hechen	(China) Yao Ruixuan	(China) Li Hechen (China) Tang Yiren	(Chinese Taipei) Wu Ying-syuan (Chinese Taipei) Chen Min-hsin	(China) Li Hechen (China) Yao Ruixuan
2025	Chinese Taipei	Japan	(China) Yu Haiyang	(Germany) Koharu Itagaki	(China) Zhou Guanhong (China) Yu Haiyang	(China) Zhu Qihui (China) Liu Ziling	(Thailand) Thitaphat Preechayan (Thailand) Kulapassr Vijitviriyagul

== Results of individual events ==
The tables below are World Youth Championships medalists of individual events (boys' and girls' singles, boys' and girls' doubles, and mixed doubles).

=== Under-19 ===
==== Boys' singles ====
Year	Host City	Gold	Silver	Bronze
2021	Vila Nova de Gaia	(China) Xiang Peng	(Poland) Samuel Kulczycki	(India) Payas Jain
2021	Vila Nova de Gaia	(China) Xiang Peng	(Poland) Samuel Kulczycki	(China) Zeng Beixun
2022	Tunis	(China) Lin Shidong	(China) Chen Yuanyu	(Romania) Darius Movileanu
2022	Tunis	(China) Lin Shidong	(China) Chen Yuanyu	(France) Félix Lebrun
2023	Nova Gorica	(China) Lin Shidong	(China) Wen Ruibo	(Chinese Taipei) Kao Cheng-jui
2023	Nova Gorica	(China) Lin Shidong	(China) Wen Ruibo	(Romania) Eduard Ionescu
2024	Helsingborg	(China) Huang Youzheng	(China) Wen Ruibo	(Japan) Yuhi Sakai
2024	Helsingborg	(China) Huang Youzheng	(China) Wen Ruibo	(Brazil) Leonardo Iizuka
2025	Cluj-Napoca	(Japan) Ryuusei Kawakami	(Japan) Kazuki Yoshiyama	(China) Wen Ruibo
2025	Cluj-Napoca	(Japan) Ryuusei Kawakami	(Japan) Kazuki Yoshiyama	(China) Li Hechen

==== Girls' singles ====
Year	Host City	Gold	Silver	Bronze
2021	Vila Nova de Gaia	(China) Kuai Man	(Japan) Miyuu Kihara	(Japan) Haruna Ojio
2021	Vila Nova de Gaia	(China) Kuai Man	(Japan) Miyuu Kihara	(China) Wu Yangchen
2022	Tunis	(Japan) Miyuu Kihara	(Japan) Miwa Harimoto	(China) Kuai Man
2022	Tunis	(Japan) Miyuu Kihara	(Japan) Miwa Harimoto	(China) Chen Yi
2023	Nova Gorica	(China) Kuai Man	(Romania) Elena Zaharia	(Germany) Annett Kaufmann
2023	Nova Gorica	(China) Kuai Man	(Romania) Elena Zaharia	(China) Xu Yi
2024	Helsingborg	(Germany) Annett Kaufmann	(China) Zong Geman	(Egypt) Hana Goda
2024	Helsingborg	(Germany) Annett Kaufmann	(China) Zong Geman	(Germany) Mia Griesel
2025	Cluj-Napoca	(China) Qin Yuxuan	(China) Zong Geman	(Japan) Yuna Ojio
2025	Cluj-Napoca	(China) Qin Yuxuan	(China) Zong Geman	(Wales) Anna Hursey

==== Boys' doubles ====
Year	Host City	Gold	Silver	Bronze
2021	Vila Nova de Gaia	(Russia) Maksim Grebnev (Russia) Vladimir Sidorenko	(Hungary) Csaba András (Croatia) Ivor Ban	(Peru) Carlos Fernández (Nigeria) Taiwo Mati
2021	Vila Nova de Gaia	(Russia) Maksim Grebnev (Russia) Vladimir Sidorenko	(Hungary) Csaba András (Croatia) Ivor Ban	(Romania) Eduard Ionescu (Romania) Darius Movileanu
2022	Tunis	(China) Lin Shidong (China) Chen Yuanyu	(Japan) Hayate Suzuki (Belgium) Adrien Rassenfosse	(Chinese Taipei) Kao Cheng-jui (Chinese Taipei) Feng Yi-hsin
2022	Tunis	(China) Lin Shidong (China) Chen Yuanyu	(Japan) Hayate Suzuki (Belgium) Adrien Rassenfosse	(France) Félix Lebrun (France) Thibault Poret
2023	Nova Gorica	(China) Lin Shidong (China) Wen Ruibo	(Singapore) Izaac Quek (Japan) Sora Matsushima	(South Korea) Oh Jun-sung (South Korea) Gil Min-seok
2023	Nova Gorica	(China) Lin Shidong (China) Wen Ruibo	(Singapore) Izaac Quek (Japan) Sora Matsushima	(Poland) Miłosz Redzimski (Japan) Keishi Hagihara
2024	Helsingborg	(China) Huang Youzheng (China) Wen Ruibo	(South Korea) Kim Ga-on (Japan) Kazuki Yoshiyama	(France) Flavien Coton (France) Nathan Lam
2024	Helsingborg	(China) Huang Youzheng (China) Wen Ruibo	(South Korea) Kim Ga-on (Japan) Kazuki Yoshiyama	(Brazil) Leonardo Iizuka (Portugal) Tiago Abiodun
2025	Cluj-Napoca	(Chinese Taipei) Kuo Guan-hong (Chinese Taipei) Hsu Hsien-chia	(Japan) Ryuusei Kawakami (Japan) Kazuki Yoshiyama	(China) Wen Ruibo (China) Li Hechen
2025	Cluj-Napoca	(Chinese Taipei) Kuo Guan-hong (Chinese Taipei) Hsu Hsien-chia	(Japan) Ryuusei Kawakami (Japan) Kazuki Yoshiyama	(Portugal) Tiago Abiodun (Romania) Iulian Chiriță

==== Girls' doubles ====
Year	Host City	Gold	Silver	Bronze
2021	Vila Nova de Gaia	(China) Kuai Man (China) Wu Yangchen	(United States) Rachel Sung (United States) Amy Wang	(Japan) Miyuu Kihara (Japan) Haruna Ojio
2021	Vila Nova de Gaia	(China) Kuai Man (China) Wu Yangchen	(United States) Rachel Sung (United States) Amy Wang	(Chinese Taipei) Cai Fong-en (Chinese Taipei) Hsu Yi-chen
2022	Tunis	(Japan) Miyuu Kihara (Japan) Miwa Harimoto	(France) Charlotte Lutz (France) Prithika Pavade	(India) Yashaswini Ghorpade (India) Suhana Saini
2022	Tunis	(Japan) Miyuu Kihara (Japan) Miwa Harimoto	(France) Charlotte Lutz (France) Prithika Pavade	(Germany) Annett Kaufmann (Germany) Mia Griesel
2023	Nova Gorica	(China) Kuai Man (China) Xu Yi	(Germany) Annett Kaufmann (Wales) Anna Hursey	(Poland) Anna Brzyska (Poland) Zuzanna Wielgos
2023	Nova Gorica	(China) Kuai Man (China) Xu Yi	(Germany) Annett Kaufmann (Wales) Anna Hursey	(South Korea) Park Ga-hyeon (South Korea) Lee Da-eun
2024	Helsingborg	(China) Qin Yuxuan (China) Zong Geman	(Japan) Rin Mende (Japan) Mao Takamori	(South Korea) Yoo Ye-rin (South Korea) Park Ga-hyeon
2024	Helsingborg	(China) Qin Yuxuan (China) Zong Geman	(Japan) Rin Mende (Japan) Mao Takamori	(Germany) Annett Kaufmann (Wales) Anna Hursey
2025	Cluj-Napoca	(Germany) Mia Griesel (Wales) Anna Hursey	(China) Zong Geman (China) Qin Yuxuan	(Egypt) Hana Goda (Ukraine) Veronika Matiunina
2025	Cluj-Napoca	(Germany) Mia Griesel (Wales) Anna Hursey	(China) Zong Geman (China) Qin Yuxuan	(Chinese Taipei) Yeh Yi-tian (Chinese Taipei) Wu Ying-syuan

==== Mixed doubles ====
Year	Host City	Gold	Silver	Bronze
2021	Vila Nova de Gaia	(Japan) Miyuu Kihara (Japan) Hiroto Shinozuka	(China) Kuai Man (China) Xiang Peng	(Poland) Samuel Kulczycki (France) Prithika Pavade
2021	Vila Nova de Gaia	(Japan) Miyuu Kihara (Japan) Hiroto Shinozuka	(China) Kuai Man (China) Xiang Peng	(China) Zeng Beixun (China) Wu Yangchen
2022	Tunis	(China) Lin Shidong (China) Kuai Man	(South Korea) Lee Ho-yun (South Korea) Lee Da-eun	(Poland) Maciej Kubik (Japan) Miwa Harimoto
2022	Tunis	(China) Lin Shidong (China) Kuai Man	(South Korea) Lee Ho-yun (South Korea) Lee Da-eun	(France) Félix Lebrun (France) Prithika Pavade
2023	Nova Gorica	(China) Lin Shidong (China) Kuai Man	(Singapore) Izaac Quek (Germany) Annett Kaufmann	(South Korea) Oh Jun-sung (South Korea) Lee Da-eun
2023	Nova Gorica	(China) Lin Shidong (China) Kuai Man	(Singapore) Izaac Quek (Germany) Annett Kaufmann	(Germany) Andre Bertelsmeier (Germany) Mia Griesel
2024	Helsingborg	(China) Huang Youzheng (China) Zong Geman	(South Korea) Oh Jun-sung (South Korea) Park Ga-hyeon	(Japan) Yuhi Sakai (Japan) Mao Takamori
2024	Helsingborg	(China) Huang Youzheng (China) Zong Geman	(South Korea) Oh Jun-sung (South Korea) Park Ga-hyeon	(Japan) Rin Mende (Japan) Kazuki Yoshiyama
2025	Cluj-Napoca	(China) Li Hechen (China) Qin Yuxuan	(Romania) Iulian Chiriță (Wales) Anna Hursey	(Japan) Ryuusei Kawakami (Japan) Sachi Aoki
2025	Cluj-Napoca	(China) Li Hechen (China) Qin Yuxuan	(Romania) Iulian Chiriță (Wales) Anna Hursey	(South Korea) Kim Ga-on (South Korea) Choi Na-hyun

=== Under-15 ===
==== Boys' singles ====
Year	Host City	Gold	Silver	Bronze
2021	Vila Nova de Gaia	(Japan) Sora Matsushima	(Poland) Miłosz Redzimski	(France) Félix Lebrun
2021	Vila Nova de Gaia	(Japan) Sora Matsushima	(Poland) Miłosz Redzimski	(Singapore) Izaac Quek
2022	Tunis	(France) Flavien Coton	(Japan) Kazuki Yoshiyama	(Kazakhstan) Alan Kurmangaliyev
2022	Tunis	(France) Flavien Coton	(Japan) Kazuki Yoshiyama	(Japan) Takumi Tanimoto
2023	Nova Gorica	(China) Sun Yang	(Japan) Tamito Watanabe	(China) Wang Jixuan
2023	Nova Gorica	(China) Sun Yang	(Japan) Tamito Watanabe	(Portugal) Tiago Abiodun
2024	Helsingborg	(China) Li Hechen	(China) Tang Yiren	(Iran) Benyamin Faraji
2024	Helsingborg	(China) Li Hechen	(China) Tang Yiren	(South Korea) Lee Seung-soo
2025	Cluj-Napoca	(China) Yu Haiyang	(China) Zhou Guanhong	(Chinese Taipei) Chen Kai-cheng
2025	Cluj-Napoca	(China) Yu Haiyang	(China) Zhou Guanhong	(South Korea) Ma Yeong-min

==== Girls' singles ====
Year	Host City	Gold	Silver	Bronze
2021	Vila Nova de Gaia	(Japan) Miwa Harimoto	(Egypt) Hana Goda	(India) Suhana Saini
2021	Vila Nova de Gaia	(Japan) Miwa Harimoto	(Egypt) Hana Goda	(Singapore) Ser Lin Qian
2022	Tunis	(China) Yan Yutong	(China) Xiang Junlin	(Japan) Rin Mende
2022	Tunis	(China) Yan Yutong	(China) Xiang Junlin	(Japan) Yuna Ojio
2023	Nova Gorica	(Japan) Yuna Ojio	(South Korea) Yoo Ye-rin	(China) Yan Yutong
2023	Nova Gorica	(Japan) Yuna Ojio	(South Korea) Yoo Ye-rin	(Chinese Taipei) Wu Jia-en
2024	Helsingborg	(China) Yao Ruixuan	(China) Hu Yi	(Chinese Taipei) Chen Min-hsin
2024	Helsingborg	(China) Yao Ruixuan	(China) Hu Yi	(Germany) Koharu Itagaki
2025	Cluj-Napoca	(Germany) Koharu Itagaki	(China) Zhu Qihui	(Japan) Cocona Muramatsu
2025	Cluj-Napoca	(Germany) Koharu Itagaki	(China) Zhu Qihui	(India) Divyanshi Bhowmick

==== Boys' doubles ====
Year	Host City	Gold	Silver	Bronze
2021	Vila Nova de Gaia	(France) Félix Lebrun (Japan) Sora Matsushima	(Russia) Ilia Koniukhov (Russia) Roman Vinogradov	(Chinese Taipei) Chang Yu-an (Singapore) Izaac Quek
2021	Vila Nova de Gaia	(France) Félix Lebrun (Japan) Sora Matsushima	(Russia) Ilia Koniukhov (Russia) Roman Vinogradov	(Romania) Dragos Bujor (Romania) Iulian Chiriță
2022	Tunis	(Slovakia) Samuel Arpáš (Hungary) Balázs Lei	(Japan) Kazuki Yoshiyama (Japan) Takumi Tanimoto	(Australia) Chulong Nie (Australia) Won Bae
2022	Tunis	(Slovakia) Samuel Arpáš (Hungary) Balázs Lei	(Japan) Kazuki Yoshiyama (Japan) Takumi Tanimoto	(France) Flavien Coton (France) Nathan Lam
2023	Nova Gorica	(Chinese Taipei) Kuo Guan-hong (Chinese Taipei) Hsu Hsien-chia	(Japan) Ryuusei Kawakami (Japan) Tamito Watanabe	(South Korea) Kwon Hyuk (South Korea) Lee Seung-soo
2023	Nova Gorica	(Chinese Taipei) Kuo Guan-hong (Chinese Taipei) Hsu Hsien-chia	(Japan) Ryuusei Kawakami (Japan) Tamito Watanabe	(Australia) Won Bae (Australia) Aditya Sareen
2024	Helsingborg	(China) Li Hechen (China) Tang Yiren	(Colombia) Emanuel Otálvaro (Italy) Danilo Faso	(South Korea) Lee Seung-soo (South Korea) Ma Yeong-min
2024	Helsingborg	(China) Li Hechen (China) Tang Yiren	(Colombia) Emanuel Otálvaro (Italy) Danilo Faso	(France) Sandro Cavaille (France) Noah Vitel
2025	Cluj-Napoca	(China) Zhou Guanhong (China) Yu Haiyang	(Turkey) Görkem Öcal (Turkey) Kenan Kahraman	(Chinese Taipei) Cheng Min-hsiu (Chinese Taipei) Chen Kai-cheng
2025	Cluj-Napoca	(China) Zhou Guanhong (China) Yu Haiyang	(Turkey) Görkem Öcal (Turkey) Kenan Kahraman	(Japan) Kenyu Hiratsuka (Japan) Soma Ono

==== Girls' doubles ====
Year	Host City	Gold	Silver	Bronze
2021	Vila Nova de Gaia	(Egypt) Hana Goda (Japan) Miwa Harimoto	(Germany) Annett Kaufmann (Germany) Mia Griesel	(Ukraine) Veronika Matiunina (India) Suhana Saini
2021	Vila Nova de Gaia	(Egypt) Hana Goda (Japan) Miwa Harimoto	(Germany) Annett Kaufmann (Germany) Mia Griesel	(Wales) Anna Hursey (Portugal) Matilde Pinto
2022	Tunis	(China) Xiang Junlin (China) Yan Yutong	(South Korea) Yoo Ye-rin (South Korea) Lee Seung-eun	(Germany) Eireen Kalaitzidou (Romania) Alesia Sferlea
2022	Tunis	(China) Xiang Junlin (China) Yan Yutong	(South Korea) Yoo Ye-rin (South Korea) Lee Seung-eun	(France) Léana Hochart (France) Gaëtane Bled
2023	Nova Gorica	(Japan) Mao Takamori (Japan) Yuna Ojio	(India) Jennifer Varghese (India) Divyanshi Bhowmick	(Germany) Koharu Itagaki (Germany) Josephina Neumann
2023	Nova Gorica	(Japan) Mao Takamori (Japan) Yuna Ojio	(India) Jennifer Varghese (India) Divyanshi Bhowmick	(France) Léana Hochart (France) Nina Guo Zheng
2024	Helsingborg	(Chinese Taipei) Wu Ying-syuan (Chinese Taipei) Chen Min-hsin	(South Korea) Choi Seo-yeon (South Korea) Heo Ye-rim	(China) Yao Ruixuan (China) Hu Yi
2024	Helsingborg	(Chinese Taipei) Wu Ying-syuan (Chinese Taipei) Chen Min-hsin	(South Korea) Choi Seo-yeon (South Korea) Heo Ye-rim	(Portugal) Júlia Leal (Poland) Katarzyna Rajkowska
2025	Cluj-Napoca	(China) Zhu Qihui (China) Liu Ziling	(Japan) Kokomi Ishida (Japan) Cocona Muramatsu	(South Korea) Heo Ye-rim (South Korea) Kim Min-seo
2025	Cluj-Napoca	(China) Zhu Qihui (China) Liu Ziling	(Japan) Kokomi Ishida (Japan) Cocona Muramatsu	(Germany) Josephina Neumann (Germany) Koharu Itagaki

==== Mixed doubles ====
Year	Host City	Gold	Silver	Bronze
2021	Vila Nova de Gaia	(Japan) Miwa Harimoto (Japan) Sora Matsushima	(Romania) Iulian Chiriță (Romania) Bianca Mei-Roșu	(Germany) Mia Griesel (Poland) Miłosz Redzimski
2021	Vila Nova de Gaia	(Japan) Miwa Harimoto (Japan) Sora Matsushima	(Romania) Iulian Chiriță (Romania) Bianca Mei-Roșu	(Chinese Taipei) Chang Yu-an (Chinese Taipei) Cheng Pu-syuan
2022	Tunis	(Kazakhstan) Alan Kurmangaliyev (Egypt) Hana Goda	(Portugal) Tiago Abiodun (Spain) María Berzosa	(Japan) Takumi Tanimoto (Japan) Rin Mende
2022	Tunis	(Kazakhstan) Alan Kurmangaliyev (Egypt) Hana Goda	(Portugal) Tiago Abiodun (Spain) María Berzosa	(Sweden) William Bergenblock (Poland) Natalia Bogdanowicz
2023	Nova Gorica	(Japan) Tamito Watanabe (Japan) Yuna Ojio	(China) Sun Yang (China) Yan Yutong	(Chinese Taipei) Kuo Guan-hong (Chinese Taipei) Wu Jia-en
2023	Nova Gorica	(Japan) Tamito Watanabe (Japan) Yuna Ojio	(China) Sun Yang (China) Yan Yutong	(India) Abhinandh Pradhivadhi (India) Jennifer Varghese
2024	Helsingborg	(China) Li Hechen (China) Yao Ruixuan	(South Korea) Lee Seung-soo (South Korea) Choi Seo-yeon	(Chinese Taipei) Hung Che-yen (Chinese Taipei) Chen Min-hsin
2024	Helsingborg	(China) Li Hechen (China) Yao Ruixuan	(South Korea) Lee Seung-soo (South Korea) Choi Seo-yeon	(France) Noah Vitel (Singapore) Loy Ming Ying
2025	Cluj-Napoca	(Thailand) Thitaphat Preechayan (Thailand) Kulapassr Vijitviriyagul	(China) Yu Haiyang (China) Zhu Qihui	(China) Zhou Guanhong (China) Liu Ziling
2025	Cluj-Napoca	(Thailand) Thitaphat Preechayan (Thailand) Kulapassr Vijitviriyagul	(China) Yu Haiyang (China) Zhu Qihui	(Malaysia) Lee Hong An (Malaysia) Mohd Dania

== Results of team events ==
The tables below are World Youth Championships medalists of team events.

=== Under-19 ===
==== Boys' team ====
Year	Host City	Gold	Silver	Bronze
2021	Vila Nova de Gaia	(China) China; Chen Yuanyu; Lin Shidong; Xiang Peng; Zeng Beixun	(Russia) Russia; Damir Akhmetsafin; Maksim Grebnev; Vladislav Makarov; Vladimir Sidorenko	(Japan) Japan; Sora Matsushima; Kazuki Yoshiyama; Kazuki Hamada; Hiroto Shinozuka
2021	Vila Nova de Gaia	(China) China; Chen Yuanyu; Lin Shidong; Xiang Peng; Zeng Beixun	(Russia) Russia; Damir Akhmetsafin; Maksim Grebnev; Vladislav Makarov; Vladimir Sidorenko	(Germany) Germany; Tom Schweiger; Hannes Hörmann; Kay Stumper; Daniel Rinderer
2022	Tunis	(China) China; Chen Yuanyu; Lin Shidong; Huang Youzheng; Zeng Beixun	(Poland) Poland; Alan Kulczycki; Miłosz Redzimski; Mateusz Zalewski; Maciej Kubik	(France) France; Hugo Deschamps; Thibault Poret; Félix Lebrun
2022	Tunis	(China) China; Chen Yuanyu; Lin Shidong; Huang Youzheng; Zeng Beixun	(Poland) Poland; Alan Kulczycki; Miłosz Redzimski; Mateusz Zalewski; Maciej Kubik	(Chinese Taipei) Chinese Taipei; Li Yan-jun; Lin Yen-chun; Wang Chen-you; Kao Cheng-jui
2023	Nova Gorica	(China) China; Huang Youzheng; Lin Shidong; Chen Yuanyu; Wen Ruibo	(Japan) Japan; Kazuki Yoshiyama; Yuhi Sakai; Keishi Hagihara; Sora Matsushima	(Romania) Romania; Andrei Istrate; Darius Movileanu; Dragos Bujor; Eduard Ionescu
2023	Nova Gorica	(China) China; Huang Youzheng; Lin Shidong; Chen Yuanyu; Wen Ruibo	(Japan) Japan; Kazuki Yoshiyama; Yuhi Sakai; Keishi Hagihara; Sora Matsushima	(South Korea) South Korea; Park Gyu-hyeon; Gil Min-seok; Lee Ho-yun; Oh Jun-sung
2024	Helsingborg	(China) China; Huang Youzheng; Chen Junsong; Sun Yang; Wen Ruibo	(Poland) Poland; Miłosz Redzimski; Mateusz Zalewski; Rafał Formela; Marcel Błaszczyk	(Romania) Romania; Andrei Istrate; Darius Movileanu; Dragos Bujor; Iulian Chiriță
2024	Helsingborg	(China) China; Huang Youzheng; Chen Junsong; Sun Yang; Wen Ruibo	(Poland) Poland; Miłosz Redzimski; Mateusz Zalewski; Rafał Formela; Marcel Błaszczyk	(Japan) Japan; Kazuki Yoshiyama; Tamito Watanabe; Yuhi Sakai; Daito Ono
2025	Cluj-Napoca	(Japan) Japan; Ryuusei Kawakami; Kazuki Yoshiyama; Tamito Watanabe; Kohaku Nakano	(India) India; Ankur Bhattacharjee; Abhinandh Pradhivadhi; Priyanuj Bhattacharyya; Punit Biswas	(Chinese Taipei) Chinese Taipei; Hsu Hsien-chia; Kuo Guan-hong; Lin Chin-ting
2025	Cluj-Napoca	(Japan) Japan; Ryuusei Kawakami; Kazuki Yoshiyama; Tamito Watanabe; Kohaku Nakano	(India) India; Ankur Bhattacharjee; Abhinandh Pradhivadhi; Priyanuj Bhattacharyya; Punit Biswas	(South Korea) South Korea; Kim Ga-on; Choi Ji-wook; Choi Ho-jun; Moon Sun-woong

==== Girls' team ====
Year	Host City	Gold	Silver	Bronze
2021	Vila Nova de Gaia	(China) China; Chen Yi; Kuai Man; Wu Yangchen	(United States) United States; Joanna Sung; Rachel Sung; Angie Tan; Amy Wang	(Japan) Japan; Haruna Ojio; Ami Shirayama; Madoka Edahiro; Miyuu Kihara
2021	Vila Nova de Gaia	(China) China; Chen Yi; Kuai Man; Wu Yangchen	(United States) United States; Joanna Sung; Rachel Sung; Angie Tan; Amy Wang	(Romania) Romania; Ioana Singeorzan; Luciana Mitrofan; Bianca Mei-Roșu; Elena Zaharia
2022	Tunis	(China) China; Qin Yuxuan; Kuai Man; Chen Yi; Han Feier	(France) France; Prithika Pavade; Charlotte Lutz; Agathe Avezou	(Japan) Japan; Miyuu Kihara; Haruna Ojio; Kaho Akae; Miwa Harimoto
2022	Tunis	(China) China; Qin Yuxuan; Kuai Man; Chen Yi; Han Feier	(France) France; Prithika Pavade; Charlotte Lutz; Agathe Avezou	(Romania) Romania; Elena Zaharia; Luciana Mitrofan; Ioana Singeorzan; Andrea Teglas
2023	Nova Gorica	(China) China; Qin Yuxuan; Chen Yi; Kuai Man; Xu Yi	(Japan) Japan; Senri Tsukasa; Rin Mende; Haruna Ojio; Sachi Aoki	(India) India; Yashaswini Ghorpade; Taneesha Kotecha; Sayali Wani; Suhana Saini
2023	Nova Gorica	(China) China; Qin Yuxuan; Chen Yi; Kuai Man; Xu Yi	(Japan) Japan; Senri Tsukasa; Rin Mende; Haruna Ojio; Sachi Aoki	(Romania) Romania; Bianca Mei-Roșu; Alesia Sferlea; Elena Zaharia; Ioana Singeorzan
2024	Helsingborg	South Korea; Kim Tae-min; Choi Na-hyun; Yoo Ye-rin; Park Ga-hyeon	Chinese Taipei; Cheng Pu-syuan; Liu Ru-yun; Yeh Yi-tian; Chen Chi-shiuan	China; Zhang Xiangyu; Xu Yi; Qin Yuxuan; Zong Geman
2024	Helsingborg	South Korea; Kim Tae-min; Choi Na-hyun; Yoo Ye-rin; Park Ga-hyeon	Chinese Taipei; Cheng Pu-syuan; Liu Ru-yun; Yeh Yi-tian; Chen Chi-shiuan	France; Charlotte Lutz; Clea De Stoppeleire; Leana Hochart; Nina Guo Zheng
2025	Cluj-Napoca	(China) China; Zong Geman; Qin Yuxuan; Yao Ruixuan; Zhu Ziyu	(Japan) Japan; Sachi Aoki; Yuna Ojio; Mao Takamori; Misuzu Takeya	(Chinese Taipei) Chinese Taipei; Chen Min-hsin; Yeh Yi-tian; Wu Ying-syuan; Chen Chia-i
2025	Cluj-Napoca	(China) China; Zong Geman; Qin Yuxuan; Yao Ruixuan; Zhu Ziyu	(Japan) Japan; Sachi Aoki; Yuna Ojio; Mao Takamori; Misuzu Takeya	(South Korea) South Korea; Yoo Ye-rin; Choi Na-hyun; Kim Eun-seo; Moon Cho-won

=== Under-15 ===
==== Boys' team ====
Year	Host City	Gold	Silver	Bronze
2021	Vila Nova de Gaia	(Russia) Russia; Ilia Koniukhov; Aleksei Samokhin; Roman Vinogradov	(United States) United States; Darius Fahimi; Jensen Feng; Nandan Naresh; Daniel Tran	(Portugal) Portugal; Bernardo Pinto; Rafael Kong; Tiago Abiodun; Rafael Silva
2021	Vila Nova de Gaia	(Russia) Russia; Ilia Koniukhov; Aleksei Samokhin; Roman Vinogradov	(United States) United States; Darius Fahimi; Jensen Feng; Nandan Naresh; Daniel Tran	(France) France; Nathan Lam; Flavien Coton; Antoine Jean Noirault
2022	Tunis	(China) China; Li Hechen; Huang Xunan; Kang Youde; Wen Ruibo	(Australia) Australia; Chulong Nie; Aditya Sareen; Won Bae	(France) France; Flavien Coton; Nathan Lam; Antoine Noirault
2022	Tunis	(China) China; Li Hechen; Huang Xunan; Kang Youde; Wen Ruibo	(Australia) Australia; Chulong Nie; Aditya Sareen; Won Bae	(Japan) Japan; Takumi Tanimoto; Kazuki Yoshiyama; Tsubasa Okamoto; Hinata Mochida
2023	Nova Gorica	(China) China; Li Hechen; Sun Yang; Kang Youde; Wang Jixuan	(Chinese Taipei) Chinese Taipei; Hsu Hsien-chia; Kuo Guan-hong; Tsai Tse-an; Tsai Tien-yu	(South Korea) South Korea; Ma Yeong-min; Kwon Hyuk; Lee Seung-soo; Kim Soo-hwan
2023	Nova Gorica	(China) China; Li Hechen; Sun Yang; Kang Youde; Wang Jixuan	(Chinese Taipei) Chinese Taipei; Hsu Hsien-chia; Kuo Guan-hong; Tsai Tse-an; Tsai Tien-yu	(Japan) Japan; Ryuusei Kawakami; Tsubasa Okamoto; Tamito Watanabe; Shunto Iwaida
2024	Helsingborg	China; Wu Yifei; Wang Zining; Tang Yiren; Li Hechen	Poland; Jan Mrugala; Patryk Zyworonek; Samuel Michna; Aleks Pakula	Chinese Taipei; Lin Chin-ting; Hung Che-yen; Chen Kai-cheng; Cheng Min-hsiu
2024	Helsingborg	China; Wu Yifei; Wang Zining; Tang Yiren; Li Hechen	Poland; Jan Mrugala; Patryk Zyworonek; Samuel Michna; Aleks Pakula	Italy; Francesco Trevisan; Danilo Faso; Erik Paulina; Giulio Campagna
2025	Cluj-Napoca	(Chinese Taipei) Chinese Taipei; Chen Kai-cheng; Cheng Min-hsiu; Yu Yi-cing; Cheng Yuan-lun	(Italy) Italy; Francesco Trevisan; Danilo Faso; Giulio Campagna; Pietro Campagna	(South Korea) South Korea; Ma Yeong-min; Lee Seung-soo; Lee Hyeon-ho; Kim Ji-hu
2025	Cluj-Napoca	(Chinese Taipei) Chinese Taipei; Chen Kai-cheng; Cheng Min-hsiu; Yu Yi-cing; Cheng Yuan-lun	(Italy) Italy; Francesco Trevisan; Danilo Faso; Giulio Campagna; Pietro Campagna	(China) China; Yu Haiyang; Zhou Guanhong; Wang Zining; Xiao Baixin

==== Girls' team ====
Year	Host City	Gold	Silver	Bronze
2021	Vila Nova de Gaia	(Japan) Japan; Miwa Harimoto; Yuna Ojio; Misaki Suzuki	(Russia) Russia; Anastasiia Ivanova; Kristina Kurilkina; Zlata Terekhova	(India) India; Kaashvi Gupta; Suhana Saini; Pritha Priya Vartikar; Sayali Rajesh Wani
2021	Vila Nova de Gaia	(Japan) Japan; Miwa Harimoto; Yuna Ojio; Misaki Suzuki	(Russia) Russia; Anastasiia Ivanova; Kristina Kurilkina; Zlata Terekhova	(United States) United States; Emily Tan; Faith Hu; Sally Moyland
2022	Tunis	(China) China; Ding Yijie; Gao Yuxin; Xiang Junlin; Yan Yutong	(Japan) Japan; Rin Mende; Sachi Aoki; Yuna Ojio; Nozomi Sato	(South Korea) South Korea; Yoo Ye-rin; Choi Ye-seo; Lee Seung-eun
2022	Tunis	(China) China; Ding Yijie; Gao Yuxin; Xiang Junlin; Yan Yutong	(Japan) Japan; Rin Mende; Sachi Aoki; Yuna Ojio; Nozomi Sato	(Romania) Romania; Bianca Mei-Roșu; Alesia Sferlea; Andreea Jifcu; Cristina Singeorzan
2023	Nova Gorica	(Japan) Japan; Yuna Ojio; Misuzu Takeya; Mao Takamori; Hikari Watanabe	(China) China; Ding Yijie; Chang Lingfei; Yan Yutong; Chen Xianchang	(South Korea) South Korea; Kim Eun-seo; Choi Na-hyun; Yoo Ye-rin
2023	Nova Gorica	(Japan) Japan; Yuna Ojio; Misuzu Takeya; Mao Takamori; Hikari Watanabe	(China) China; Ding Yijie; Chang Lingfei; Yan Yutong; Chen Xianchang	(France) France; Nina Guo Zheng; Gaëtane Bled; Léana Hochart
2024	Helsingborg	China; Zhu Qihui; Yang Huize; Yao Ruixuan; Hu Yi	Chinese Taipei; Lin Huan-ting; Wu Ying-syuan; Chen Chi-yun; Chen Min-hsin	Germany; Josephina Neumann; Elisa Nguyen; Koharu Itagaki; Lisa Wang
2024	Helsingborg	China; Zhu Qihui; Yang Huize; Yao Ruixuan; Hu Yi	Chinese Taipei; Lin Huan-ting; Wu Ying-syuan; Chen Chi-yun; Chen Min-hsin	Hong Kong; Zhang Jia Yu; Mak Ming Shum; Su Tsz Tung; Yuen Sum Lok
2025	Cluj-Napoca	(Japan) Japan; Cocona Muramatsu; Kokomi Ishida; Aoba Takahashi; Hisa Uriu	(South Korea) South Korea; Heo Ye-rim; Lee Hae-lin; Kim Min-seo; Seo A-yeong	(China) China; Liu Ziling; Zhu Qihui; Zhao Wangqi; Yang Huize
2025	Cluj-Napoca	(Japan) Japan; Cocona Muramatsu; Kokomi Ishida; Aoba Takahashi; Hisa Uriu	(South Korea) South Korea; Heo Ye-rim; Lee Hae-lin; Kim Min-seo; Seo A-yeong	(India) India; Ankolika Chakraborty; Divyanshi Bhowmick; Ananya Muralidharan; Naisha Rewaskar
