= 2023 ITTF World Youth Championships =

Table tennis tournament in Slovenia

Tournament details
- Dates: 26 November – 3 December 2023
- Edition: 3rd
- Venue: Primary School Milojka Strukelj
- Location: Nova Gorica, Slovenia

The 2023 ITTF World Youth Championships were held in Nova Gorica, Slovenia, from 26 November to 3 December 2023.

== Medal table ==
| Rank | Nation | Gold | Silver | Bronze | Total |
|---|---|---|---|---|---|
| 1 | China | 9 | 3 | 3 | 15 |
| 2 | Japan | 4 | 4.5 | 1.5 | 10 |
| 3 | Chinese Taipei | 1 | 1 | 3 | 5 |
| 4 | South Korea | 0 | 1 | 7 | 8 |
| 5 | Germany | 0 | 1 | 3 | 4 |
| 5 | Romania | 0 | 1 | 3 | 4 |
| 7 | India | 0 | 1 | 2 | 3 |
| 8 | Singapore | 0 | 1 | 0 | 1 |
| 9 | Wales | 0 | 0.5 | 0 | 0.5 |
| 10 | France | 0 | 0 | 2 | 2 |
| 11 | Poland | 0 | 0 | 1.5 | 1.5 |
| 12 | Australia | 0 | 0 | 1 | 1 |
| 12 | Portugal | 0 | 0 | 1 | 1 |
| Totals (13 entries) | | 14 | 14 | 28 | 56 |

== Medalists ==
=== Under-19 ===
| Event | Gold | Silver | Bronze |
|---|---|---|---|
| Boys' singles | (China) Lin Shidong | (China) Wen Ruibo | (Chinese Taipei) Kao Cheng-jui |
| Boys' singles | (China) Lin Shidong | (China) Wen Ruibo | (Romania) Eduard Ionescu |
| Girls' singles | (China) Kuai Man | (Romania) Elena Zaharia | (Germany) Annett Kaufmann |
| Girls' singles | (China) Kuai Man | (Romania) Elena Zaharia | (China) Xu Yi |
| Boys' doubles | (China) Lin Shidong (China) Wen Ruibo | (Singapore) Izaac Quek (Japan) Sora Matsushima | (South Korea) Oh Jun-sung (South Korea) Gil Min-seok |
| Boys' doubles | (China) Lin Shidong (China) Wen Ruibo | (Singapore) Izaac Quek (Japan) Sora Matsushima | (Poland) Milosz Redzimski (Japan) Keishi Hagihara |
| Girls' doubles | (China) Kuai Man (China) Xu Yi | (Germany) Annett Kaufmann (Wales) Anna Hursey | (Poland) Anna Brzyska (Poland) Zuzanna Wielgos |
| Girls' doubles | (China) Kuai Man (China) Xu Yi | (Germany) Annett Kaufmann (Wales) Anna Hursey | (South Korea) Park Ga-hyeon (South Korea) Lee Da-eun |
| Mixed doubles | (China) Lin Shidong (China) Kuai Man | (Singapore) Izaac Quek (Germany) Annett Kaufmann | (South Korea) Oh Jun-sung (South Korea) Lee Da-eun |
| Mixed doubles | (China) Lin Shidong (China) Kuai Man | (Singapore) Izaac Quek (Germany) Annett Kaufmann | (Germany) Andre Bertelsmeier (Germany) Mia Griesel |
| Boys' team | China; Huang Youzheng; Lin Shidong; Chen Yuanyu; Wen Ruibo | Japan; Kazuki Yoshiyama; Yuhi Sakai; Keishi Hagihara; Sora Matsushima | Romania; Andrei Istrate; Darius Movileanu; Dragos Bujor; Eduard Ionescu |
| Boys' team | China; Huang Youzheng; Lin Shidong; Chen Yuanyu; Wen Ruibo | Japan; Kazuki Yoshiyama; Yuhi Sakai; Keishi Hagihara; Sora Matsushima | South Korea; Park Gyu-hyeon; Gil Min-seok; Lee Ho-yun; Oh Jun-sung |
| Girls' team | China; Qin Yuxuan; Chen Yi; Kuai Man; Xu Yi | Japan; Senri Tsukasa; Rin Mende; Haruna Ojio; Sachi Aoki | India; Yashaswini Ghorpade; Taneesha Kotecha; Sayali Wani; Suhana Saini |
| Girls' team | China; Qin Yuxuan; Chen Yi; Kuai Man; Xu Yi | Japan; Senri Tsukasa; Rin Mende; Haruna Ojio; Sachi Aoki | Romania; Bianca Mei-Rosu; Alesia Sferlea; Elena Zaharia; Ioana Singeorzan |

=== Under-15 ===
| Event | Gold | Silver | Bronze |
|---|---|---|---|
| Boys' singles | (China) Sun Yang | (Japan) Tamito Watanabe | (China) Wang Jixuan |
| Boys' singles | (China) Sun Yang | (Japan) Tamito Watanabe | (Portugal) Tiago Abiodun |
| Girls' singles | (Japan) Yuna Ojio | (South Korea) Yoo Ye-rin | (China) Yan Yutong |
| Girls' singles | (Japan) Yuna Ojio | (South Korea) Yoo Ye-rin | (Chinese Taipei) Wu Jia-en |
| Boys' doubles | (Chinese Taipei) Kuo Guan-hong (Chinese Taipei) Hsu Hsien-chia | (Japan) Ryuusei Kawakami (Japan) Tamito Watanabe | (South Korea) Kwon Hyuk (South Korea) Lee Seung-soo |
| Boys' doubles | (Chinese Taipei) Kuo Guan-hong (Chinese Taipei) Hsu Hsien-chia | (Japan) Ryuusei Kawakami (Japan) Tamito Watanabe | (Australia) Won Bae (Australia) Aditya Sareen |
| Girls' doubles | (Japan) Mao Takamori (Japan) Yuna Ojio | (India) Jennifer Varghese (India) Divyanshi Bhowmick | (Germany) Koharu Itagaki (Germany) Josephina Neumann |
| Girls' doubles | (Japan) Mao Takamori (Japan) Yuna Ojio | (India) Jennifer Varghese (India) Divyanshi Bhowmick | (France) Leana Hochart (France) Nina Guo Zheng |
| Mixed doubles | (Japan) Tamito Watanabe (Japan) Yuna Ojio | (China) Sun Yang (China) Yan Yutong | (Chinese Taipei) Kuo Guan-hong (Chinese Taipei) Wu Jia-en |
| Mixed doubles | (Japan) Tamito Watanabe (Japan) Yuna Ojio | (China) Sun Yang (China) Yan Yutong | (India) Abhinandh Pradhivadhi (India) Jennifer Varghese |
| Boys' team | China; Li Hechen; Sun Yang; Kang Youde; Wang Jixuan | Chinese Taipei; Hsu Hsien-chia; Kuo Guan-hong; Tsai Tse-an; Tsai Tien-yu | South Korea; Ma Yeong-min; Kwon Hyuk; Lee Seung-soo; Kim Soo-hwan |
| Boys' team | China; Li Hechen; Sun Yang; Kang Youde; Wang Jixuan | Chinese Taipei; Hsu Hsien-chia; Kuo Guan-hong; Tsai Tse-an; Tsai Tien-yu | Japan; Ryuusei Kawakami; Tsubasa Okamoto; Tamito Watanabe; Shunto Iwaida |
| Girls' team | Japan; Yuna Ojio; Misuzu Takeya; Mao Takamori; Hikari Watanabe | China; Ding Yijie; Chang Lingfei; Yan Yutong; Chen Xianchang | South Korea; Kim Eun-seo; Choi Na-hyun; Yoo Ye-rin |
| Girls' team | Japan; Yuna Ojio; Misuzu Takeya; Mao Takamori; Hikari Watanabe | China; Ding Yijie; Chang Lingfei; Yan Yutong; Chen Xianchang | France; Nina Guo Zheng; Gaetane Bled; Leana Hochart |
