= 2021 ITTF World Youth Championships =

Table tennis tournament in Portugal

Tournament details
- Dates: 2–8 December 2021
- Edition: 1st
- Venue: Pavilhão Desportivo Municipal de Gaia
- Location: Vila Nova de Gaia, Portugal

The 2021 ITTF World Youth Championships were held in Vila Nova de Gaia, Portugal, from 2 to 8 December 2021. It was the first edition of the ITTF World Youth Championships, which replaced the World Junior Championships in the ITTF calendar.

== Medal summary ==
=== Events ===
==== Under-19 ====
Event	Gold	Silver	Bronze
Boys' singles	China; Xiang Peng	Poland; Samuel Kulczycki	India; Payas Jain
Boys' singles	China; Xiang Peng	Poland; Samuel Kulczycki	China; Zeng Beixun
Girls' singles	China; Kuai Man	Japan; Miyuu Kihara	Japan; Haruna Ojio
Girls' singles	China; Kuai Man	Japan; Miyuu Kihara	China; Wu Yangchen
Boys' doubles	Russia; Maksim Grebnev; Vladimir Sidorenko	Hungary; Csaba Andras; Croatia; Ivor Ban	Peru; Carlos Fernández; Nigeria; Taiwo Mati
Boys' doubles	Russia; Maksim Grebnev; Vladimir Sidorenko	Hungary; Csaba Andras; Croatia; Ivor Ban	Romania; Eduard Ionescu; Darius Movileanu
Girls' doubles	China; Kuai Man; Wu Yangchen	United States; Rachel Sung; Amy Wang	Japan; Miyuu Kihara; Haruna Ojio
Girls' doubles	China; Kuai Man; Wu Yangchen	United States; Rachel Sung; Amy Wang	Chinese Taipei; Cai Fong-en; Hsu Yi-chen
Mixed doubles	Japan; Miyuu Kihara; Hiroto Shinozuka	China; Kuai Man; Xiang Peng	Poland; Samuel Kulczycki; France; Prithika Pavade
Mixed doubles	Japan; Miyuu Kihara; Hiroto Shinozuka	China; Kuai Man; Xiang Peng	China; Zeng Beixun; Wu Yangchen
Boys' team	China; Chen Yuanyu; Lin Shidong; Xiang Peng; Zeng Beixun	Russia; Damir Akhmetsafin; Maksim Grebnev; Vladislav Makarov; Vladimir Sidorenko	Japan; Sora Matsushima; Kazuki Yoshiyama; Kazuki Hamada; Hiroto Shinozuka
Boys' team	China; Chen Yuanyu; Lin Shidong; Xiang Peng; Zeng Beixun	Russia; Damir Akhmetsafin; Maksim Grebnev; Vladislav Makarov; Vladimir Sidorenko	Germany; Tom Schweiger; Hannes Hörmann; Kay Stumper; Daniel Rinderer
Girls' team	China; Chen Yi; Kuai Man; Wu Yangchen	United States; Joanna Sung; Rachel Sung; Angie Tan; Amy Wang	Japan; Haruna Ojio; Ami Shirayama; Madoka Edahiro; Miyuu Kihara
Girls' team	China; Chen Yi; Kuai Man; Wu Yangchen	United States; Joanna Sung; Rachel Sung; Angie Tan; Amy Wang	Romania; Ioana Singeorzan; Luciana Mitrofan; Bianca Mei Rosu; Elena Zaharia

==== Under-15 ====
Event	Gold	Silver	Bronze
Boys' singles	Japan; Sora Matsushima	Poland; Milosz Redzimski	France; Felix Lebrun
Boys' singles	Japan; Sora Matsushima	Poland; Milosz Redzimski	Singapore; Izaac Quek Yong
Girls' singles	Japan; Miwa Harimoto	Egypt; Hana Goda	India; Suhana Saini
Girls' singles	Japan; Miwa Harimoto	Egypt; Hana Goda	Singapore; Ser Lin Qian
Boys' doubles	France; Felix Lebrun; Japan; Sora Matsushima	Russia; Ilia Koniukhov; Roman Vinogradov	Chinese Taipei; Chang Yu-an; Singapore; Yong Izaac Quek
Boys' doubles	France; Felix Lebrun; Japan; Sora Matsushima	Russia; Ilia Koniukhov; Roman Vinogradov	Romania; Dragos Bujor; Iulian Chirita
Girls' doubles	Egypt; Hana Goda; Japan; Miwa Harimoto	Germany; Mia Griesel; Annett Kaufmann	Ukraine; Veronika Matiunina; India; Suhana Saini
Girls' doubles	Egypt; Hana Goda; Japan; Miwa Harimoto	Germany; Mia Griesel; Annett Kaufmann	Wales; Anna Hursey; Portugal; Matilde Pinto
Mixed doubles	Japan; Miwa Harimoto; Sora Matsushima	Romania; Iulian Chirita; Bianca Mei Rosu	Germany; Mia Griesel; Poland; Milosz Redzimski
Mixed doubles	Japan; Miwa Harimoto; Sora Matsushima	Romania; Iulian Chirita; Bianca Mei Rosu	Chinese Taipei; Chang Yu-an; Cheng Pu-syuan
Boys' team	Russia; Ilia Koniukhov; Aleksei Samokhin; Roman Vinogradov	United States; Darius Fahimi; Jensen Feng; Nandan Naresh; Daniel Tran	Portugal; Bernardo Pinto; Rafael Kong; Tiago Abiodun; Rafael Silva
Boys' team	Russia; Ilia Koniukhov; Aleksei Samokhin; Roman Vinogradov	United States; Darius Fahimi; Jensen Feng; Nandan Naresh; Daniel Tran	France; Nathan Lam; Flavien Coton; Antoine Jean Noirault
Girls' team	Japan; Miwa Harimoto; Yuna Ojio; Misaki Suzuki	Russia; Anastasiia Ivanova; Kristina Kurilkina; Zlata Terekhova	India; Kaashvi Gupta; Suhana Saini; Pritha Priya Vartikar; Sayali Rajesh Wani
Girls' team	Japan; Miwa Harimoto; Yuna Ojio; Misaki Suzuki	Russia; Anastasiia Ivanova; Kristina Kurilkina; Zlata Terekhova	United States; Emily Tan; Faith Hu; Sally Moyland

=== Medal table ===
* Host nation (Portugal)

Rank	Nation	Gold	Silver	Bronze	Total
1	Japan	6	1	4	11
2	China	5	1	3	9
3	Russia	2	3	0	5
4	Egypt	0.5	1	0	1.5
5	France	0.5	0	2.5	3
6	United States	0	3	1	4
7	Poland	0	2	1	3
8	Romania	0	1	3	4
9	Germany	0	1	1.5	2.5
10	Croatia	0	0.5	0	0.5
10	Hungary	0	0.5	0	0.5
12	India	0	0	3.5	3.5
13	Chinese Taipei	0	0	2.5	2.5
13	Singapore	0	0	2.5	2.5
15	Portugal*	0	0	1.5	1.5
16	Nigeria	0	0	0.5	0.5
16	Peru	0	0	0.5	0.5
16	Ukraine	0	0	0.5	0.5
16	Wales	0	0	0.5	0.5
Totals (19 entries)		14	14	28	56

== See also ==
- 2021 World Table Tennis Championships
