= 2026 World Team Table Tennis Championships – Men's team =

Men's team at the 2026 World Team Table Tennis Championships
- Venue: Copper Box Arena; OVO Arena Wembley
- Location: London, England
- Dates: 28 April – 10 May
- Teams: 64

Medalists
gold medal	Wang Chuqin; Lin Shidong; Xiang Peng; Zhou Qihao; Liang Jingkun	China
silver medal	Tomokazu Harimoto; Sora Matsushima; Shunsuke Togami; Yukiya Uda; Hiroto Shinozuka	Japan
bronze medal	Lin Yun-ju; Feng Yi-hsin; Kuo Guan-hong; Hung Jing-kai; Hsu Hsien-chia	Chinese Taipei
bronze medal	Felix Lebrun; Alexis Lebrun; Simon Gauzy; Flavien Coton; Thibault Poret	France

The men's team tournament of the 2026 World Team Table Tennis Championships was held from 28 April to 10 May 2026.

China's 26-year winning streak in team matches was ended by South Korea, followed by a second consecutive loss to Sweden in the group stage. However, the Chinese men's team managed to record five consecutive victories in the knockout stage, clinching their 24th title with a win over Japan.

== Playing system ==
All team matches in the event were played as a best-of-five series of individual matches, with the following order of play:

Match 1	Match 2	Match 3	Match 4	Match 5
A1 vs B2	A2 vs B1	A3 vs B3	A1 vs B1	A2 vs B2

The competition was divided into two stages:

=== Group stage ===
Teams seeded 1 to 7 and the host nation were drawn into Groups 1 and 2 (Stage 1a). All teams in Groups 1 and 2 were guaranteed a spot in the 32-team main draw of the knockout stage, as this phase of the competition was only to determine seeding.

The 56 remaining teams were drawn into Groups 3 to 16 (Stage 1b). The top two teams from each of these groups advanced; however, only the 14 winners and the top six runners-up advanced directly to the main draw. The remaining eight runners-up played in a preliminary round ahead of the main draw. The ranking of the runners-up was based on the win-loss ratios of team matches, individual matches, games, and points, in that order.

=== Knockout stage ===
After the four matches of the preliminary round, the main draw began with the Round of 32. Teams in Groups 1 and 2 were the top eight seeds in the draw, while the winners of Groups 3 to 10 were seeds 9 to 16.

== Teams ==
Stage 1a teams were.

- China
- Chinese Taipei
- England
- France
- Germany
- Japan
- South Korea
- Sweden

All other teams started in Stage 1b.

== Group stage ==
=== Stage 1a ===
==== Group 1 ====
Pos	Team	Pld	W	L	MF	MA	MR	Pts
1	Sweden	3	3	0	9	3	3.000	6
2	South Korea	3	2	1	6	4	1.500	5
3	China	3	1	2	6	6	1.000	4
4	England (H)	3	0	3	1	9	0.111	3

Source: World Table Tennis
Rules for classification: 1) points; 2) head-to-head points; 3) head-to-head match ratio.
(H) Hosts

2 May 2026; 12:30	England	0–3	China

	Individual matches
Tom Jarvis	0–3	Lin Shidong	9–11, 5–11, 8–11
Sam Walker	1–3	Wang Chuqin	9–11, 6–11, 13–11, 6–11
Connor Green	2–3	Liang Jingkun	7–11, 11–5, 8–11, 11–8, 9–11

2 May 2026; 12:30	Sweden	3–0	South Korea

	Individual matches
Truls Möregårdh	3–1	An Jae-hyun	8–11, 11–5, 11–2, 12–10
Anton Källberg	3–1	Jang Woo-jin	4–11, 11–7, 11–7, 11–8
Mattias Karlsson	3–2	Oh Jun-sung	11–6, 8–11, 10–12, 16–14, 11–2

2 May 2026; 19:30	England	1–3	Sweden

	Individual matches
Tom Jarvis	3–1	Mattias Karlsson	6–11, 12–10, 11–6, 11–9
Sam Walker	0–3	Anton Källberg	15–17, 7–11, 6–11
Connor Green	0–3	Truls Möregårdh	12–14, 8–11, 6–11
Tom Jarvis	0–3	Anton Källberg	8–11, 8–11, 2–11

2 May 2026; 19:30	China	1–3	South Korea

	Individual matches
Lin Shidong	3–0	Kim Jang-won	12–10, 11–5, 11–2
Liang Jingkun	1–3	Oh Jun-sung	11–6, 4–11, 9–11, 9–11
Zhou Qihao	1–3	An Jae-hyun	9–11, 9–11, 11–8, 18–20
Lin Shidong	1–3	Oh Jun-sung	9–11, 11–5, 10–12, 9–11

3 May 2026; 12:30	China	2–3	Sweden

	Individual matches
Wang Chuqin	3–0	Anton Källberg	11–8, 11–5, 11–6
Lin Shidong	2–3	Elias Ranefur	9–11, 6–11, 11–3, 11–6, 9–11
Liang Jingkun	2–3	Truls Möregårdh	7–11, 11–9, 9–11, 11–3, 10–12
Wang Chuqin	3–0	Elias Ranefur	12–10, 11–6, 11–4
Lin Shidong	1–3	Anton Källberg	10–12, 12–10, 8–11, 8–11

3 May 2026; 17:00	England	0–3	South Korea

	Individual matches
Tom Jarvis	0–3	Oh Jun-sung	7–11 , 6–11 , 6–11
Sam Walker	0–3	Jang Woo-jin	2–11 , 5–11 , 2–11
Connor Green	0–3	An Jae-hyun	7–11 , 6–11 , 8–11

==== Group 2 ====
Pos	Team	Pld	W	L	MF	MA	MR	Pts
1	France	3	3	0	9	3	3.000	6
2	Japan	3	1	2	7	6	1.167	4 (Note: Head-to-head match ratio: Japan 1.667 (5:3), Germany 0.800 (4:5), Chinese Taipei 0.750 (3:4))
3	Germany	3	1	2	5	8	0.625	4
4	Chinese Taipei	3	1	2	3	7	0.429	4

Source: World Table Tennis
Rules for classification: 1) points; 2) head-to-head points; 3) head-to-head match ratio.
Notes:

2 May 2026; 12:30	Germany	3–2	Japan

	Individual matches
Dang Qiu	3–0	Sora Matsushima	14–12, 11–3, 11–3
Benedikt Duda	2–3	Tomokazu Harimoto	4–11, 12–10, 8–11, 11–8, 5–11
Patrick Franziska	2–3	Shunsuke Togami	11–5, 1–11, 9–11, 11–5, 5–11
Dang Qiu	3–0	Tomokazu Harimoto	11–9, 11–9, 12–10
Benedikt Duda	3–1	Sora Matsushima	11–5, 6–11, 11–8, 11–7

2 May 2026; 12:30	Chinese Taipei	0–3	France

	Individual matches
Kuo Guan-hong	0–3	Alexis Lebrun	8–11, 8–11, 6–11
Feng Yi-hsin	1–3	Félix Lebrun	8–11, 7–11, 11–8, 5–11
Hsu Hsien-chia	0–3	Simon Gauzy	8–11, 8–11, 7–11

2 May 2026; 19:30	Chinese Taipei	0–3	Japan

	Individual matches
Feng Yi-hsin	1–3	Shunsuke Togami	4–11, 10–12, 11–9, 7–11
Kuo Guan-hong	1–3	Tomokazu Harimoto	6–11, 12–14, 11–7, 7–11
Hung Jing-kai	0–3	Sora Matsushima	4–11, 7–11, 11–13

2 May 2026; 19:30	Germany	1–3	France

	Individual matches
Benedikt Duda	3–1	Simon Gauzy	12–10, 8–11, 11–9, 11–5
Dang Qiu	1–3	Félix Lebrun	7–11, 12–10, 6–11, 4–11
Dimitrij Ovtcharov	1–3	Alexis Lebrun	13–11, 6–11, 5–11, 6–11
Benedikt Duda	0–3	Félix Lebrun	8–11, 10–12, 6–11

3 May 2026; 17:00	Japan	2–3	France

	Individual matches
Tomokazu Harimoto	3–0	Alexis Lebrun	11–8, 11–7, 11–6
Sora Matsushima	3–1	Félix Lebrun	11–9, 11–5, 6–11, 12–10
Shunsuke Togami	2–3	Flavien Coton	11–6, 4–11, 12–10, 9–11, 12–14
Tomokazu Harimoto	0–3	Félix Lebrun	9–11, 2–11, 4–11
Sora Matsushima	2–3	Alexis Lebrun	9–11, 8–11, 11–8, 11–9, 9–11

3 May 2026; 17:00	Chinese Taipei	3–1	Germany

	Individual matches
Feng Yi-hsin	0–3	Benedikt Duda	9–11, 9–11, 1–11
Lin Yun-ju	3–0	Dang Qiu	11–5, 11–8, 11–8
Kuo Guan-hong	3–2	Patrick Franziska	13–15, 8–11, 11–5, 12–10, 12–10
Feng Yi-hsin	3–2	Dang Qiu	12–10, 7–11, 11–3, 9–11, 11–9

=== Stage 1b ===
==== Group 3 ====
Pos	Team	Pld	W	L	MF	MA	MR	Pts	Qualification	(Denmark)	(Mexico)	(Madagascar)	(Mongolia)
1	Denmark	3	3	0	9	0	—	6	Main draw		3–0	3–0	3–0
2	Mexico	3	2	1	6	4	1.500	5	Main draw or preliminary round based of ranking			3–1	3–0
3	Madagascar	3	1	2	4	8	0.500	4					3–2
4	Mongolia	3	0	3	2	9	0.222	3					

Source: World Table Tennis
Rules for classification: 1) points; 2) head-to-head points; 3) head-to-head match ratio.

==== Group 4 ====
Pos	Team	Pld	W	L	MF	MA	MR	Pts	Qualification	(Brazil)	(Hungary)	(Puerto Rico)	(Uzbekistan)
1	Brazil	3	3	0	9	3	3.000	6	Main draw		3–2	3–1	3–0
2	Hungary	3	2	1	8	3	2.667	5	Main draw or preliminary round based of ranking			3–0	3–0
3	Puerto Rico	3	1	2	4	7	0.571	4					3–1
4	Uzbekistan	3	0	3	1	9	0.111	3					

Source: World Table Tennis
Rules for classification: 1) points; 2) head-to-head points; 3) head-to-head match ratio.

==== Group 5 ====
Pos	Team	Pld	W	L	MF	MA	MR	Pts	Qualification	(Spain)	(Slovenia)	(Czech Republic)	(Bahrain)
1	Spain	3	3	0	9	2	4.500	6	Main draw		3–1	3–1	3–0
2	Slovenia	3	2	1	7	3	2.333	5	Main draw or preliminary round based of ranking			3–0	3–0
3	Czech Republic	3	1	2	4	7	0.571	4					3–0
4	Bahrain	3	0	3	0	9	0.000	3					

Source: World Table Tennis
Rules for classification: 1) points; 2) head-to-head points; 3) head-to-head match ratio.

==== Group 6 ====
Pos	Team	Pld	W	L	MF	MA	MR	Pts	Qualification	(Portugal)	(Greece)	(Algeria)	(New Caledonia)
1	Portugal	3	3	0	9	0	—	6	Main draw		3–0	3–0	3–0
2	Greece	3	2	1	6	4	1.500	5	Main draw or preliminary round based of ranking			3–1	3–0
3	Algeria	3	1	2	4	6	0.667	4					3–0
4	New Caledonia	3	0	3	0	9	0.000	3					

Source: World Table Tennis
Rules for classification: 1) points; 2) head-to-head points; 3) head-to-head match ratio.

==== Group 7 ====
Pos	Team	Pld	W	L	MF	MA	MR	Pts	Qualification	(India)	(Slovakia)	(Tunisia)	(Guatemala)
1	India	3	3	0	9	2	4.500	6	Main draw		3–2	3–0	3–0
2	Slovakia	3	2	1	8	3	2.667	5	Main draw or preliminary round based of ranking			3–0	3–0
3	Tunisia	3	1	2	3	7	0.429	4					3–1
4	Guatemala	3	0	3	1	9	0.111	3					

Source: World Table Tennis
Rules for classification: 1) points; 2) head-to-head points; 3) head-to-head match ratio.

==== Group 8 ====
Pos	Team	Pld	W	L	MF	MA	MR	Pts	Qualification	(Croatia)	(Serbia)	(Luxembourg)	(Qatar)
1	Croatia	3	3	0	9	1	9.000	6	Main draw		3–0	3–1	3–0
2	Serbia	3	2	1	6	4	1.500	5	Main draw or preliminary round based of ranking			3–1	3–0
3	Luxembourg	3	1	2	5	6	0.833	4					3–0
4	Qatar	3	0	3	0	9	0.000	3					

Source: World Table Tennis
Rules for classification: 1) points; 2) head-to-head points; 3) head-to-head match ratio.

==== Group 9 ====
Pos	Team	Pld	W	L	MF	MA	MR	Pts	Qualification	(Romania)	(Argentina)	(Peru)	(Benin)
1	Romania	3	3	0	9	1	9.000	6	Main draw		3–0	3–1	3–0
2	Argentina	3	2	1	6	3	2.000	5	Main draw or preliminary round based of ranking			3–0	3–0
3	Peru	3	1	2	4	8	0.500	4					3–2
4	Benin	3	0	3	2	9	0.222	3					

Source: World Table Tennis
Rules for classification: 1) points; 2) head-to-head points; 3) head-to-head match ratio.

==== Group 10 ====
Pos	Team	Pld	W	L	MF	MA	MR	Pts	Qualification	(North Korea)	(Australia)	(Morocco)	(New Zealand)
1	North Korea	3	3	0	9	0	—	6	Main draw		3–0	3–0	3–0
2	Australia	3	2	1	6	3	2.000	5	Main draw or preliminary round based of ranking			3–0	3–0
3	Morocco	3	1	2	3	7	0.429	4					3–1
4	New Zealand	3	0	3	1	9	0.111	3					

Source: World Table Tennis
Rules for classification: 1) points; 2) head-to-head points; 3) head-to-head match ratio.

==== Group 11 ====
Pos	Team	Pld	W	L	MF	MA	MR	Pts	Qualification	(Kazakhstan)	(Egypt)	(Turkey)	(Thailand)
1	Kazakhstan	3	3	0	9	4	2.250	6	Main draw		3–2	3–1	3–1
2	Egypt	3	2	1	8	6	1.333	5	Main draw or preliminary round based of ranking			3–2	3–1
3	Turkey	3	1	2	6	7	0.857	4					3–1
4	Thailand	3	0	3	3	9	0.333	3					

Source: World Table Tennis
Rules for classification: 1) points; 2) head-to-head points; 3) head-to-head match ratio.

==== Group 12 ====
Pos	Team	Pld	W	L	MF	MA	MR	Pts	Qualification	(Poland)	(Moldova)	(Chile)	(French Polynesia)
1	Poland	3	3	0	9	2	4.500	6	Main draw		3–2	3–0	3–0
2	Moldova	3	2	1	8	4	2.000	5	Main draw or preliminary round based of ranking			3–1	3–0
3	Chile	3	1	2	4	6	0.667	4					3–0
4	French Polynesia	3	0	3	0	9	0.000	3					

Source: World Table Tennis
Rules for classification: 1) points; 2) head-to-head points; 3) head-to-head match ratio.

==== Group 13 ====
Pos	Team	Pld	W	L	MF	MA	MR	Pts	Qualification	(Austria)	(Italy)	(Malaysia)	(Togo)
1	Austria	3	3	0	9	0	—	6	Main draw		3–0	3–0	w/o
2	Italy	3	2	1	6	4	1.500	5	Main draw or preliminary round based of ranking			3–1	w/o
3	Malaysia	3	1	2	4	6	0.667	4					w/o
4	Togo	3	0	3	0	9	0.000	0					

Source: World Table Tennis
Rules for classification: 1) points; 2) head-to-head points; 3) head-to-head match ratio.

==== Group 14 ====
Pos	Team	Pld	W	L	MF	MA	MR	Pts	Qualification	(Singapore)	(United States)	(Angola)	(Ivory Coast)
1	Singapore	3	3	0	9	2	4.500	6	Main draw		3–2	3–0	w/o
2	United States	3	2	1	8	3	2.667	5	Main draw or preliminary round based of ranking			3–0	w/o
3	Angola	3	1	2	3	6	0.500	4					w/o
4	Ivory Coast	3	0	3	0	9	0.000	0					

Source: World Table Tennis
Rules for classification: 1) points; 2) head-to-head points; 3) head-to-head match ratio.

==== Group 15 ====
Pos	Team	Pld	W	L	MF	MA	MR	Pts	Qualification	(Hong Kong)	(Nigeria)	(Saudi Arabia)	(South Africa)
1	Hong Kong	3	3	0	9	0	—	6	Main draw		3–0	3–0	3–0
2	Nigeria	3	2	1	6	5	1.200	5	Main draw or preliminary round based of ranking			3–2	3–0
3	Saudi Arabia	3	1	2	5	6	0.833	4					3–0
4	South Africa	3	0	3	0	9	0.000	3					

Source: World Table Tennis
Rules for classification: 1) points; 2) head-to-head points; 3) head-to-head match ratio.

==== Group 16 ====
Pos	Team	Pld	W	L	MF	MA	MR	Pts	Qualification	(Canada)	(Belgium)	(Cameroon)	(Fiji)
1	Canada	3	3	0	9	0	—	6	Main draw		3–0	3–0	3–0
2	Belgium	3	2	1	6	3	2.000	5	Main draw or preliminary round based of ranking			3–0	3–0
3	Cameroon	3	1	2	3	6	0.500	4					3–0
4	Fiji	3	0	3	0	9	0.000	3					

Source: World Table Tennis
Rules for classification: 1) points; 2) head-to-head points; 3) head-to-head match ratio.

==== Ranking of second-placed teams (Groups 3–16) ====
Pos	Grp	Team	W	L	MF	MA	MR	GF	GA	GR	Qualification
1	14	United States	2	1	8	3	2.667	24	10	2.400	Main draw
2	7	Slovakia	2	1	8	3	2.667	24	13	1.846	Main draw
3	4	Hungary	2	1	8	3	2.667	27	15	1.800	Main draw
4	5	Slovenia	2	1	7	3	2.333				Main draw
5	16	Belgium	2	1	6	3	2.000	22	9	2.444	Main draw
6	10	Australia	2	1	6	3	2.000	23	12	1.917	Main draw
7	12	Moldova	2	1	8	4	2.000	29	17	1.706	Preliminary round
8	9	Argentina	2	1	6	3	2.000	21	13	1.615	Preliminary round
9	6	Greece	2	1	6	4	1.500	24	13	1.846	Preliminary round
10	13	Italy	2	1	6	4	1.500	21	12	1.750	Preliminary round
11	3	Mexico	2	1	6	4	1.500	22	13	1.692	Preliminary round
12	8	Serbia	2	1	6	4	1.500	20	17	1.176	Preliminary round
13	11	Egypt	2	1	8	6	1.333				Preliminary round
14	15	Nigeria	2	1	6	5	1.200				Preliminary round

Source: World Table Tennis
Rules for classification: 1) match ratio; 2) game ratio; 3) point ratio.

== Knockout stage ==
=== Preliminary round ===
Match 1
1 May
Moldova	3
Greece	2

Match 2
1 May
Italy	3
Argentina	0

Match 3
1 May
Egypt	3
Nigeria	0

Match 4
1 May
Mexico	1
Serbia	3

=== Main draw ===
==== Finals ====
Semi-finals
9 May
Chinese Taipei	0
Japan	3
9 May
China	3
France	1

Final
10 May
Japan	0
China	3

==== Top half ====
===== Section 1 =====
Round of 32
5 May
Sweden	3
Hungary	0
4 May
Italy	2
Croatia	3
4 May
Denmark	3
Canada	2
5 May
Serbia	0
Chinese Taipei	3

Round of 16
6 May
Sweden	3
Croatia	0
6 May
Denmark	0
Chinese Taipei	3

Quarterfinals
7 May
Sweden	2
Chinese Taipei	3

===== Section 2 =====
Round of 32
5 May
Germany	3
Slovenia	0
4 May
Hong Kong	3
North Korea	0
4 May
Spain	1
Kazakhstan	3
4 May
Belgium	1
Japan	3

Round of 16
6 May
Germany	3
Hong Kong	0
6 May
Kazakhstan	1
Japan	3

Quarterfinals
7 May
Germany	1
Japan	3

==== Bottom Half ====
===== Section 3 =====
Round of 32
5 May
South Korea	3
Slovakia	0
5 May
Austria	3
India	0
4 May
Romania	3
Poland	2
5 May
Australia	0
China	3

Round of 16
6 May
South Korea	3
Austria	0
6 May
Romania	1
China	3

Quarterfinals
8 May
South Korea	0
China	3

===== Section 4 =====
Round of 32
4 May
England	3
Moldova	1
5 May
Singapore	1
Brazil	3
5 May
Portugal	3
Egypt	0
4 May
United States	0
France	3

Round of 16
6 May
England	2
Brazil	3
6 May
Portugal	0
France	3

Quarterfinals
8 May
Brazil	0
France	3

=== Round of 32 ===
4 May 2026; 10:00	Hong Kong	3–0	North Korea

	Individual matches
Wong Chun-ting	3–1	Ham Yu-song	12–10, 5–11, 11–9, 11–6
Baldwin Chan	3–0	Ri Jong Sik	12–10, 11–9, 11–8
Lam Siu-hang	3–0	U Tae Ryong	11–9, 12–10, 11–8

4 May 2026; 10:00	Italy	2–3	Croatia

	Individual matches
John Oyebode	0–3	Andrej Gaćina	9–11, 3–11, 7–11
Mateo Mutti	0–3	Tomislav Pucar	3–11, 8–11, 7–11
Danilo Faso	3–1	Ivor Bam	11–6, 11–5, 8–11, 12–10
John Oyebode	3–2	Tomislav Pucar	8–11, 11–6, 7–11, 14–12, 11–7
Mateo Mutti	1–3	Andrej Gaćina	12–10, 7–11, 5–11, 6–11

4 May 2026; 12:30	Belgium	1–3	Japan

	Individual matches
Adrien Rassenfosse	1–3	Sora Matsushima	11–9, 4–11, 6–11, 7–11
Cédric Nuytinck	3–1	Tomokazu Harimoto	11–9, 11–8, 5–11, 11–8
Martin Allegro	0–3	Shunsuke Togami	8–11, 4–11, 8–11
Adrien Rassenfosse	1–3	Tomokazu Harimoto	8–11, 11–5, 8–11, 3–11

4 May 2026; 12:30	Spain	1–3	Kazakhstan

	Individual matches
Álvaro Robles	1–3	Alan Kurmangaliyev	7–11, 11–9, 7–11, 8–11
Juan Pérez	1–3	Kirill Gerassimenko	5–11, 11–1, 6–11, 10–12
Daniel Berzosa	3–1	Aidos Kenzhigulov	11–7, 14–12, 7–11, 11–5
Álvaro Robles	0–3	Kirill Gerassimenko	7–11, 9–11, 4–11

4 May 2026; 17:00	United States	0–3	France

	Individual matches
Kanak Jha	1–3	Flavien Coton	11–13, 11–8, 5–11, 9–11
Jishan Liang	0–3	Félix Lebrun	5–11, 1–11, 3–11
Nandan Naresh	0–3	Simon Gauzy	3–11, 4–11, 4–11

4 May 2026; 17:00	Moldova	1–3	England

	Individual matches
Vladislav Ursu	3–0	Sam Walker	11–6, 11–3, 11–8
Andrei Putuntica	0–3	Tom Jarvis	5–11, 9–11, 8–11
Denis Terna	1–3	Connor Green	11–9, 6–11, 3–11, 2–11
Vladislav Ursu	1–3	Tom Jarvis	11–5, 7–11, 10–12, 9–11

4 May 2026; 17:00	Poland	2–3	Romania

	Individual matches
Miłosz Redzimski	2–3	Iulian Chiriță	8–11, 9–11, 11–6, 11–3, 7–11
Marek Badowski	3–0	Eduard Ionescu	11–8, 11–2, 11–8
Maciej Kubik	1–3	Ovidiu Ionescu	3–11, 9–11, 11–6, 6–11
Milosz Redzimski	3–2	Eduard Ionescu	7–11, 10–12, 11–9, 11–5, 11–4
Marek Badowski	0–3	Iulian Chiriță	4–11, 8–11, 10–12

4 May 2026; 19:30	Canada	2–3	Denmark

	Individual matches
Eugene Wang	0–3	Jonathan Groth	8–11, 6–11, 9–11
Edward Ly	1–3	Anders Lind	13–11, 5–11, 6–11, 3–11
Simeon Martin	3–2	Tobias Rasmussen	12–10, 11–13, 16–14, 8–11, 17–15
Eugene Wang	3–1	Anders Lind	11–3, 8–11, 11–8, 11–6
Edward Ly	0–3	Jonathan Groth	1–11, 8–11, 13–15

5 May 2026; 10:00	Australia	0–3	China

	Individual matches
Nicholas Lum	0–3	Liang Jingkun	9–11, 5–11, 6–11
Aditya Sareen	0–3	Wang Chuqin	9–11, 1–11, 2–11
Finn Luu	0–3	Lin Shidong	5–11, 4–11, 7–11

5 May 2026; 10:00	Serbia	0–3	Chinese Taipei

	Individual matches
Dimitrije Levajac	1–3	Lin Yun-ju	11–8, 4–11, 5–11, 7–11
Uroš Ninković	0–3	Feng Yi-hsin	11–13, 5–11, 8–11
Nemanja Dilas	0–3	Kuo Guan-hong	8–11, 7–11, 9–11

5 May 2026; 12:30	Slovakia	0–3	South Korea

	Individual matches
Ľubomír Pištej	2–3	Oh Jun-sung	7–11, 7–11, 11–7, 11–8, 7–11
Wang Yang	0–3	Jang Woo-jin	8–11, 10–12, 4–11
Adam Klajber	0–3	An Jae-hyun	9–11, 6–11, 7–11

5 May 2026; 12:30	Portugal	3–0	Egypt

	Individual matches
Marcos Freitas	3–0	Youssef Abdel-Aziz	11–5, 11–6, 11–8
Tiago Apolónia	3–1	Omar Assar	13–11, 5–11, 11–8, 11–5
João Geraldo	3–1	Badr Mostafa	9–11, 11–6, 11–9, 11–5

5 May 2026; 17:00	Sweden	3–0	Hungary

	Individual matches
Truls Möregårdh	3–0	Ádám Szudi	12–10, 11–5, 11–5
Anton Källberg	3–1	Csaba András	11–7, 10–12, 11–6, 11–8
Kristian Karlsson	3–0	Dávid Szántosi	11–7, 11–7, 13–11

5 May 2026; 17:00	Austria	3–0	India

	Individual matches
Robert Gardos	3–2	Manush Shah	6–11, 11–7, 11–3, 8–11, 13–11
Daniel Habesohn	3–0	Manav Thakkar	11–7, 11–5, 11–6
Andreas Levenko	3–0	Sathiyan Gnanasekaran	11–5, 11–8, 11–9

5 May 2026; 19:30	Germany	3–0	Slovenia

	Individual matches
Benedikt Duda	3–0	Deni Kožul	11–8, 12–10, 11–7
Patrick Franziska	3–1	Darko Jorgić	14–12, 1–11, 11–8, 11–8
Dang Qiu	3–0	Bojan Tokić	11–6, 11–8, 11–8

5 May 2026; 19:30	Singapore	1–3	Brazil

	Individual matches
Izaac Quek	3–1	Leonardo Iizuka	11–7, 11–5, 5–11, 11–8
Pang Yew En Koen	0–3	Hugo Calderano	5–11, 7–11, 14–16
Josh Chua	0–3	Guilherme Teodoro	8–11, 10–12, 11–13
Izaac Quek	0–3	Hugo Calderano	10–12, 5–11, 8–11

=== Round of 16 ===
6 May 2026; 10:00	Romania	1–3	China

	Individual matches
Eduard Ionescu	3–0	Liang Jingkun	11–5, 11–7, 11–6
Iulian Chiriță	0–3	Wang Chuqin	5–11, 10–12, 5–11
Ovidiu Ionescu	0–3	Lin Shidong	9–11, 6–11, 4–11
Eduard Ionescu	1–3	Wang Chuqin	8–11, 11–8, 3–11, 4–11

6 May 2026; 10:00	Denmark	0–3	Chinese Taipei

	Individual matches
Jonathan Groth	2–3	Feng Yi-hsin	11–5, 11–5, 7–11, 8–11, 11–13
Anders Lind	1–3	Lin Yun-ju	11–7, 4–11, 3–11, 9–11
Tobias Rasmussen	1–3	Kuo Guan-hong	4–11, 12–10, 7–11, 6–11

6 May 2026; 12:30	Kazakhstan	1–3	Japan

	Individual matches
Kirill Gerassimenko	3–1	Sora Matsushima	5–11, 11–8, 14–12, 11–7
Alan Kurmangaliyev	0–3	Tomokazu Harimoto	7–11, 6–11, 6–11
Aidos Kenzhigulov	0–3	Shunsuke Togami	8–11, 8–11, 8–11
Kirill Gerassimenko	0–3	Tomokazu Harimoto	9–11, 9–11, 5–11

6 May 2026; 12:30	France	3–0	Portugal

	Individual matches
Alexis Lebrun	3–1	Tiago Apolónia	14–16, 11–7, 11–1, 11–5
Félix Lebrun	3–0	Marcos Freitas	11–3, 11–9, 11–6
Flavien Coton	3–1	João Geraldo	11–5, 10–12, 11–4, 11–9

6 May 2026; 17:00	Germany	3–0	Hong Kong

	Individual matches
Benedikt Duda	3–1	Wong Chun-ting	11–7, 7–11, 11–4, 11–7
Dang Qiu	3–0	Baldwin Chan	11–9, 12–10, 11–7
Patrick Franziska	3–1	Lam Siu-hang	10–12, 11–9, 11–5, 13–11

6 May 2026; 17:00	Croatia	0–3	Sweden

	Individual matches
Tomislav Pucar	1–3	Anton Källberg	10–12, 11–8, 3–11, 8–11
Andrej Gaćina	2–3	Truls Möregårdh	6–11, 12–10, 9–11, 11–6, 5–11
Filip Zeljko	0–3	Elias Ranefur	5–11, 6–11, 5–11

6 May 2026; 19:30	England	2–3	Brazil

	Individual matches
Tom Jarvis	0–3	Hugo Calderano	6–11, 8–11, 11–13
Connor Green	0–3	Guilherme Teodoro	14–16, 10–12, 6–11
Sam Walker	3–1	Leonardo Iizuka	9–11, 11–6, 11–6, 11–9
Tom Jarvis	3–1	Guilherme Teodoro	11–5, 6–11, 11–6, 12–10
Connor Green	0–3	Hugo Calderano	8–11, 8–11, 4–11

6 May 2026; 19:30	South Korea	3–0	Austria

	Individual matches
Jang Woo-jin	3–0	Daniel Habesohn	11–6, 11–3, 11–3
Oh Jun-sung	3–2	Robert Gardos	8–11, 11–7, 6–11, 13–11, 11–3
An Jae-hyun	3–0	Andreas Levenko	11–5, 11–4, 11–3

=== Quarterfinals ===
7 May 2026; 12:30	Japan	3–1	Germany

	Individual matches
Tomokazu Harimoto	3–0	Benedikt Duda	11–4, 11–4, 11–6
Sora Matsushima	3–1	Dang Qiu	5–11, 11–2, 12–10, 11–5
Shunsuke Togami	1–3	Patrick Franziska	6–11, 9–11, 11–8, 7–11
Tomokazu Harimoto	3–0	Dang Qiu	12–10, 15–13, 11–9

7 May 2026; 19:30	Sweden	2–3	Chinese Taipei

	Individual matches
Truls Möregårdh	0–3	Lin Yun-ju	8–11, 9–11, 11–13
Anton Källberg	2–3	Kuo Guan-hong	11–4, 8–11, 11–8, 9–11, 7–11
Elias Ranefur	3–1	Feng Yi-hsin	7–11, 11–5, 11–4, 11–5
Truls Möregårdh	3–0	Kuo Guan-hong	11–6, 11–8, 12–10
Anton Källberg	0–3	Lin Yun-ju	8–11, 9–11, 5–11

8 May 2026; 12:30	China	3–0	South Korea

	Individual matches
Wang Chuqin	3–2	Oh Jun-sung	11–9, 11–1, 8–11, 7–11, 11–7
Lin Shidong	3–0	Jang Woo-jin	11–3, 13–11, 11–8
Liang Jingkun	3–0	An Jae-hyun	11–7, 11–5, 15–13

8 May 2026; 19:30	Brazil	0–3	France

	Individual matches
Hugo Calderano	0–3	Flavien Coton	10–12, 8–11, 9–11
Guilherme Teodoro	0–3	Félix Lebrun	4–11, 2–11, 4–11
Leonardo Iizuka	1–3	Alexis Lebrun	13–11, 3–11, 4–11, 7–11

=== Semifinals ===
9 May 2026; 17:00	Japan	3–0	Chinese Taipei

	Individual matches
Tomokazu Harimoto	3–1	Lin Yun-ju	5–11, 11–9, 12–10, 12–10
Sora Matsushima	3–0	Feng Yi-hsin	11–8, 11–8, 11–4
Shunsuke Togami	3–0	Kuo Guan-hong	11–8, 11–9, 11–5

9 May 2026; 19:30	China	3–1	France

	Individual matches
Wang Chuqin	3–2	Flavien Coton	15–13, 11–13, 9–11, 11–4, 11–8
Lin Shidong	0–3	Félix Lebrun	9–11, 9–11, 10–12
Liang Jingkun	3–2	Alexis Lebrun	3–11, 1–11, 15–13, 12–10, 11–2
Wang Chuqin	3–1	Félix Lebrun	13–11, 9–11, 11–9, 11–4

=== Final ===
10 May 2026; 16:00	Japan	0–3	China

	Individual matches
Tomokazu Harimoto	2–3	Liang Jingkun	11–8, 11–4, 9–11, 11–13, 8–11
Sora Matsushima	1–3	Wang Chuqin	11–8, 10–12, 2–11, 9–11
Shunsuke Togami	1–3	Lin Shidong	9–11, 5–11, 11–7, 9–11
