= 2024 ITTF World Youth Championships =

Table tennis tournament in Sweden

Tournament details
- Dates: 22–29 November 2024
- Edition: 4th
- Venue: Helsingborg Arena
- Location: Helsingborg, Sweden

The 2024 ITTF World Youth Championships were held in Helsingborg, Sweden, from 22 November to 29 November 2024.

== Medal table ==
Rank	Nation	Gold	Silver	Bronze	Total
1	China	11	4	2	17
2	South Korea	1	3.5	3	7.5
3	Chinese Taipei	1	2	3	6
4	Germany	1	0	3.5	4.5
5	Poland	0	2	0.5	2.5
6	Japan	0	1.5	4	5.5
7	Italy	0	0.5	1	1.5
8	Colombia	0	0.5	0	0.5
9	France	0	0	3.5	3.5
10	Brazil	0	0	1.5	1.5
11	Egypt	0	0	1	1
11	Hong Kong	0	0	1	1
11	Iran	0	0	1	1
11	Portugal	0	0	1	1
11	Romania	0	0	1	1
16	Singapore	0	0	0.5	0.5
16	Wales	0	0	0.5	0.5
Totals (17 entries)		14	14	28	56

== Medalists ==
=== Under-19 ===
Event	Gold	Silver	Bronze
Boys' singles	(China) Huang Youzheng	(China) Wen Ruibo	(Japan) Yuhi Sakai
Boys' singles	(China) Huang Youzheng	(China) Wen Ruibo	(Brazil) Leonardo Iizuka
Girls' singles	(Germany) Annett Kaufmann	(China) Zong Geman	(Egypt) Hana Goda
Girls' singles	(Germany) Annett Kaufmann	(China) Zong Geman	(Germany) Mia Griesel
Boys' doubles	(China) Huang Youzheng (China) Wen Ruibo	(South Korea) Kim Ga-on (Japan) Kazuki Yoshiyama	(France) Flavien Coton (France) Nathan Lam
Boys' doubles	(China) Huang Youzheng (China) Wen Ruibo	(South Korea) Kim Ga-on (Japan) Kazuki Yoshiyama	(Brazil) Leonardo Iizuka (Portugal) Tiago Abiodun
Girls' doubles	(China) Qin Yuxuan (China) Zong Geman	(Japan) Rin Mende (Japan) Mao Takamori	(South Korea) Yoo Ye-rin (South Korea) Park Ga-hyeon
Girls' doubles	(China) Qin Yuxuan (China) Zong Geman	(Japan) Rin Mende (Japan) Mao Takamori	(Germany) Annett Kaufmann (Wales) Anna Hursey
Mixed doubles	(China) Huang Youzheng (China) Zong Geman	(South Korea) Oh Jun-sung (South Korea) Park Ga-hyeon	(Japan) Yuhi Sakai (Japan) Mao Takamori
Mixed doubles	(China) Huang Youzheng (China) Zong Geman	(South Korea) Oh Jun-sung (South Korea) Park Ga-hyeon	(Japan) Rin Mende (Japan) Kazuki Yoshiyama
Boys' team	China; Huang Youzheng; Sun Yang; Wen Ruibo; Chen Junsong	Poland; Milosz Redzimski; Mateusz Zalewski; Rafal Formela; Marcel Blaszczyk	Japan; Kazuki Yoshiyama; Tamito Watanabe; Yuhi Sakai; Daito Ono
Boys' team	China; Huang Youzheng; Sun Yang; Wen Ruibo; Chen Junsong	Poland; Milosz Redzimski; Mateusz Zalewski; Rafal Formela; Marcel Blaszczyk	Romania; Iulian Chirita; Darius Movileanu; Dragos Bujor; Andrei Istrate
Girls' team	South Korea; Kim Tae-min; Choi Na-hyun; Yoo Ye-rin; Park Ga-hyeon	Chinese Taipei; Cheng Pu-syuan; Liu Ru-yun; Yeh Yi-tian; Chen Chi-shiuan	China; Zhang Xiangyu; Xu Yi; Qin Yuxuan; Zong Geman
Girls' team	South Korea; Kim Tae-min; Choi Na-hyun; Yoo Ye-rin; Park Ga-hyeon	Chinese Taipei; Cheng Pu-syuan; Liu Ru-yun; Yeh Yi-tian; Chen Chi-shiuan	France; Charlotte Lutz; Clea De Stoppeleire; Leana Hochart; Nina Guo Zheng

=== Under-15 ===
Event	Gold	Silver	Bronze
Boys' singles	(China) Li Hechen	(China) Tang Yiren	(Iran) Benyamin Faraji
Boys' singles	(China) Li Hechen	(China) Tang Yiren	(South Korea) Lee Seung-soo
Girls' singles	(China) Yao Ruixuan	(China) Hu Yi	(Chinese Taipei) Chen Min-hsin
Girls' singles	(China) Yao Ruixuan	(China) Hu Yi	(Germany) Koharu Itagaki
Boys' doubles	(China) Li Hechen (China) Tang Yiren	(Colombia) Emanuel Otálvaro (Italy) Danilo Faso	(South Korea) Lee Seung-soo (South Korea) Ma Yeong-min
Boys' doubles	(China) Li Hechen (China) Tang Yiren	(Colombia) Emanuel Otálvaro (Italy) Danilo Faso	(France) Sandro Cavaille (France) Noah Vitel
Girls' doubles	(Chinese Taipei) Wu Ying-syuan (Chinese Taipei) Chen Min-hsin	(South Korea) Choi Seo-yeon (South Korea) Heo Ye-rim	(China) Yao Ruixuan (China) Hu Yi
Girls' doubles	(Chinese Taipei) Wu Ying-syuan (Chinese Taipei) Chen Min-hsin	(South Korea) Choi Seo-yeon (South Korea) Heo Ye-rim	(Portugal) Julia Leal (Poland) Katarzyna Rajkowska
Mixed doubles	(China) Li Hechen (China) Yao Ruixuan	(South Korea) Lee Seung-soo (South Korea) Choi Seo-yeon	(Chinese Taipei) Hung Che-yen (Chinese Taipei) Chen Min-hsin
Mixed doubles	(China) Li Hechen (China) Yao Ruixuan	(South Korea) Lee Seung-soo (South Korea) Choi Seo-yeon	(Singapore) Loy Ming Ying (France) Noah Vitel
Boys' team	China; Wu Yifei; Wang Zining; Tang Yiren; Li Hechen	Poland; Jan Mrugala; Patryk Zyworonek; Samuel Michna; Aleks Pakula	Chinese Taipei; Lin Chin-ting; Hung Che-yen; Chen Kai-cheng; Cheng Min-hsiu
Boys' team	China; Wu Yifei; Wang Zining; Tang Yiren; Li Hechen	Poland; Jan Mrugala; Patryk Zyworonek; Samuel Michna; Aleks Pakula	Italy; Francesco Trevisan; Danilo Faso; Erik Paulina; Giulio Campagna
Girls' team	China; Zhu Qihui; Yang Huize; Yao Ruixuan; Hu Yi	Chinese Taipei; Lin Huan-ting; Wu Ying-syuan; Chen Chi-yun; Chen Min-hsin	Germany; Josephina Neumann; Elisa Nguyen; Koharu Itagaki; Lisa Wang
Girls' team	China; Zhu Qihui; Yang Huize; Yao Ruixuan; Hu Yi	Chinese Taipei; Lin Huan-ting; Wu Ying-syuan; Chen Chi-yun; Chen Min-hsin	Hong Kong; Zhang Jia Yu; Mak Ming Shum; Su Tsz Tung; Yuen Sum Lok
