= 2022 ITTF World Youth Championships =

Table tennis tournament in Tunisia

Tournament details
- Dates: 4–11 December 2022
- Edition: 2nd
- Venue: Salle Omnisport de Radès
- Location: Tunis, Tunisia

The 2022 ITTF World Youth Championships were held in Tunis, Tunisia, from 4 to 11 December 2022. It was the second edition of the ITTF World Youth Championships, which replaced the World Junior Championships in the ITTF calendar in 2021.

== Medal summary ==
=== Events ===
==== Under-19 ====
Event	Gold	Silver	Bronze
Boys' singles	(China) Lin Shidong	(China) Chen Yuanyu	(Romania) Darius Movileanu
Boys' singles	(China) Lin Shidong	(China) Chen Yuanyu	(France) Felix Lebrun
Girls' singles	(Japan) Miyuu Kihara	(Japan) Miwa Harimoto	(China) Kuai Man
Girls' singles	(Japan) Miyuu Kihara	(Japan) Miwa Harimoto	(China) Chen Yi
Boys' doubles	(China) Lin Shidong (China) Chen Yuanyu	(Japan) Hayate Suzuki (Belgium) Adrien Rassenfosse	(Chinese Taipei) Kao Cheng-jui (Chinese Taipei) Feng Yi-hsin
Boys' doubles	(China) Lin Shidong (China) Chen Yuanyu	(Japan) Hayate Suzuki (Belgium) Adrien Rassenfosse	(France) Felix Lebrun (France) Thibault Poret
Girls' doubles	(Japan) Miyuu Kihara (Japan) Miwa Harimoto	(France) Charlotte Lutz (France) Prithika Pavade	(India) Yashaswini Ghorpade (India) Suhana Saini
Girls' doubles	(Japan) Miyuu Kihara (Japan) Miwa Harimoto	(France) Charlotte Lutz (France) Prithika Pavade	(Germany) Annett Kaufmann (Germany) Mia Griesel
Mixed doubles	(China) Lin Shidong (China) Kuai Man	(South Korea) Lee Ho-yun (South Korea) Lee Da-eun	(Poland) Maciej Kubik (Japan) Miwa Harimoto
Mixed doubles	(China) Lin Shidong (China) Kuai Man	(South Korea) Lee Ho-yun (South Korea) Lee Da-eun	(France) Felix Lebrun (France) Prithika Pavade
Boys' team	China; Chen Yuanyu; Lin Shidong; Huang Youzheng; Zeng Beixun	Poland; Alan Kulczycki; Milosz Redzimski; Mateusz Zalewski; Maciej Kubik	France; Hugo Deschamps; Thibault Poret; Felix Lebrun
Boys' team	China; Chen Yuanyu; Lin Shidong; Huang Youzheng; Zeng Beixun	Poland; Alan Kulczycki; Milosz Redzimski; Mateusz Zalewski; Maciej Kubik	Chinese Taipei; Li Yan-jun; Lin Yen-chun; Wang Chen-you; Kao Cheng-jui
Girls' team	China; Qin Yuxuan; Kuai Man; Chen Yi; Han Feier	France; Prithika Pavade; Charlotte Lutz; Agathe Avezou	Japan; Miyuu Kihara; Haruna Ojio; Kaho Akae; Miwa Harimoto
Girls' team	China; Qin Yuxuan; Kuai Man; Chen Yi; Han Feier	France; Prithika Pavade; Charlotte Lutz; Agathe Avezou	Romania; Elena Zaharia; Luciana Mitrofan; Ioana Singeorzan; Andrea Teglas

==== Under-15 ====
Event	Gold	Silver	Bronze
Boys' singles	(France) Flavien Coton	(Japan) Kazuki Yoshiyama	(Kazakhstan) Alan Kurmangaliyev
Boys' singles	(France) Flavien Coton	(Japan) Kazuki Yoshiyama	(Japan) Takumi Tanimoto
Girls' singles	(China) Yan Yutong	(China) Xiang Junlin	(Japan) Rin Mende
Girls' singles	(China) Yan Yutong	(China) Xiang Junlin	(Japan) Yuna Ojio
Boys' doubles	(Slovakia) Samuel Arpas (Hungary) Balazs Lei	(Japan) Kazuki Yoshiyama (Japan) Takumi Tanimoto	(Australia) Chulong Nie (Australia) Won Bae
Boys' doubles	(Slovakia) Samuel Arpas (Hungary) Balazs Lei	(Japan) Kazuki Yoshiyama (Japan) Takumi Tanimoto	(France) Flavien Coton (France) Nathan Lam
Girls' doubles	(China) Xiang Junlin (China) Yan Yutong	(South Korea) Yoo Ye-rin (South Korea) Lee Seung-eun	(Germany) Eireen Elena Kalaitzidou (Romania) Alesia Sferlea
Girls' doubles	(China) Xiang Junlin (China) Yan Yutong	(South Korea) Yoo Ye-rin (South Korea) Lee Seung-eun	(France) Leana Hochart (France) Gaetane Bled
Mixed doubles	(Kazakhstan) Alan Kurmangaliyev (Egypt) Hana Goda	(Portugal) Tiago Abiodun (Spain) Maria Berzosa	(Japan) Takumi Tanimoto (Japan) Rin Mende
Mixed doubles	(Kazakhstan) Alan Kurmangaliyev (Egypt) Hana Goda	(Portugal) Tiago Abiodun (Spain) Maria Berzosa	(Sweden) William Bergenblock (Poland) Natalia Bogdanowicz
Boys' team	China; Li Hechen; Huang Xunan; Kang Youde; Wen Ruibo	Australia; Chulong Nie; Aditya Sareen; Won Bae	France; Flavien Coton; Nathan Lam; Antoine Noirault
Boys' team	China; Li Hechen; Huang Xunan; Kang Youde; Wen Ruibo	Australia; Chulong Nie; Aditya Sareen; Won Bae	Japan; Takumi Tanimoto; Kazuki Yoshiyama; Tsubasa Okamoto; Hinata Mochida
Girls' team	China; Ding Yijie; Gao Yuxin; Xiang Junlin; Yan Yutong	Japan; Rin Mende; Sachi Aoki; Yuna Ojio; Nozomi Sato	South Korea; Yoo Ye-rin; Choi Ye-seo; Lee Seung-eun
Girls' team	China; Ding Yijie; Gao Yuxin; Xiang Junlin; Yan Yutong	Japan; Rin Mende; Sachi Aoki; Yuna Ojio; Nozomi Sato	Romania; Bianca Mei Rosu; Alesia Sferlea; Andreea Jifcu; Cristina Singeorzan

=== Medal table ===
Rank	Nation	Gold	Silver	Bronze	Total
1	China	9	2	2	13
2	Japan	2	4.5	6.5	13
3	France	1	2	7	10
4	Kazakhstan	0.5	0	1	1.5
5	Egypt	0.5	0	0	0.5
5	Hungary	0.5	0	0	0.5
5	Slovakia	0.5	0	0	0.5
8	South Korea	0	2	1	3
9	Australia	0	1	1	2
9	Poland	0	1	1	2
11	Belgium	0	0.5	0	0.5
11	Portugal	0	0.5	0	0.5
11	Spain	0	0.5	0	0.5
14	Romania	0	0	3.5	3.5
15	Chinese Taipei	0	0	2	2
16	Germany	0	0	1.5	1.5
17	India	0	0	1	1
18	Sweden	0	0	0.5	0.5
Totals (18 entries)		14	14	28	56

== See also ==
- 2022 World Team Table Tennis Championships
