= Table tennis at the 2026 Asian Games =

- Venue: Sky Hall Toyota
- Dates: 20–28 September 2026
- Competitors: 196 from 28 nations

Table tennis at the 2026 Asian Games was held between 20 and 28 September at Sky Hall Toyota.

== Schedule ==
The schedule is as follows:

G	Group stage	P	Preliminary round	¼	Quarterfinals	½	Semifinals	F	Gold medal match

Date	20th Sun	21st Mon		22nd Tue		23rd Wed		24th Thu		25th Fri		26th Sat		27th Sun		28th Mon	
Event	M	M	E	M	E	M	E	M	E	M		M	E	M	E	M	E
Men's singles						P		P		P		P	¼			½	F
Men's doubles						P				P			¼	½	F		
Men's team	G	G	P	P	¼		½		F								
Women's singles						P				P		P	¼	½	F		
Women's doubles			P					P		P			¼			½	F
Women's team	G	G	P	P	¼		½		F								
Mixed doubles				P		P				¼	½		F				

== Medal summary ==
=== Medal table ===
* Host nation (Japan)

Rank	Nation	Gold	Silver	Bronze	Total
1	China (CHN)	6	4	1	11
2	Japan (JPN)*	1	3	3	7
3	South Korea (KOR)	0	0	3	3
4	Chinese Taipei (TPE)	0	0	2	2
5	Hong Kong (HKG)	0	0	1	1
5	India (IND)	0	0	1	1
5	Iran (IRI)	0	0	1	1
5	North Korea (PRK)	0	0	1	1
5	Thailand (THA)	0	0	1	1
Totals (9 entries)		7	7	14	28

=== Medalists ===
Event	Gold	Silver	Bronze
Men's singles	Lin Shidong; China	Wang Chuqin; China	Noshad Alamian; Iran
Men's singles	Lin Shidong; China	Wang Chuqin; China	Lin Yun-ju; Chinese Taipei
Men's doubles	China; Lin Shidong; Huang Youzheng	Japan; Tomokazu Harimoto; Hiroto Shinozuka	Japan; Sora Matsushima; Shunsuke Togami
Men's doubles	China; Lin Shidong; Huang Youzheng	Japan; Tomokazu Harimoto; Hiroto Shinozuka	China; Wen Ruibo; Xiang Peng
Men's team	Japan; Tomokazu Harimoto; Sora Matsushima; Hiroto Shinozuka; Shunsuke Togami; Yukiya Uda	China; Huang Youzheng; Lin Shidong; Wang Chuqin; Wen Ruibo; Xiang Peng	South Korea; An Jae-hyun; Jang Woo-jin; Lim Jong-hoon; Oh Jun-sung; Park Gyu-hyeon
Men's team	Japan; Tomokazu Harimoto; Sora Matsushima; Hiroto Shinozuka; Shunsuke Togami; Yukiya Uda	China; Huang Youzheng; Lin Shidong; Wang Chuqin; Wen Ruibo; Xiang Peng	Chinese Taipei; Feng Yi-hsin; Hsu Hsien-chia; Hung Jing-kai; Kuo Guan-hong; Lin Yun-ju
Women's singles	Wang Manyu; China	Sun Yingsha; China	Miwa Harimoto; Japan
Women's singles	Wang Manyu; China	Sun Yingsha; China	Hina Hayata; Japan
Women's doubles	China; Kuai Man; Wang Manyu	Japan; Miwa Harimoto; Hina Hayata	Hong Kong; Doo Hoi Kem; Ng Wing Lam
Women's doubles	China; Kuai Man; Wang Manyu	Japan; Miwa Harimoto; Hina Hayata	Thailand; Suthasini Sawettabut; Orawan Paranang
Women's team	China; Chen Yi; Fan Shuhan; Kuai Man; Sun Yingsha; Wang Manyu	Japan; Miwa Harimoto; Hina Hayata; Mima Ito; Rin Mende; Miyu Nagasaki	South Korea; Joo Cheon-hui; Kim Na-yeong; Lee Eun-hye; Park Ga-hyeon; Shin Yu-bin
Women's team	China; Chen Yi; Fan Shuhan; Kuai Man; Sun Yingsha; Wang Manyu	Japan; Miwa Harimoto; Hina Hayata; Mima Ito; Rin Mende; Miyu Nagasaki	North Korea; Cha Su Yong; Choe Jong Im; Kim Kum Yong; Pyon Song Gyong
Mixed doubles	China; Kuai Man; Lin Shidong	China; Sun Yingsha; Wang Chuqin	South Korea; Shin Yu-bin; Lim Jong-hoon
Mixed doubles	China; Kuai Man; Lin Shidong	China; Sun Yingsha; Wang Chuqin	India; Diya Chitale; Manush Shah

== Participating nations ==
- Bangladesh (6)
- Bahrain (4)
- China (10)
- Hong Kong (10)
- Indonesia (10)
- India (10)
- Iran (7)
- Japan (10) (host)
- Kazakhstan (10)
- Kyrgyzstan (4)
- South Korea (10)
- Laos (5)
- Lebanon (4)
- Macau (6)
- Malaysia (2)
- Maldives (8)
- Mongolia (8)
- Nepal (6)
- Pakistan (9)
- North Korea (6)
- Qatar (10)
- Singapore (10)
- Sri Lanka (2)
- Syria (2)
- Thailand (8)
- Chinese Taipei (10)
- Uzbekistan (6)
- Yemen (3)
