= Table tennis at the 2026 Asian Games – Men's singles =

Men's singles at the 2026 Asian Games
- Venue: Sky Hall Toyota
- Date: 24–28 September 2026
- Competitors: 51 from 26 nations

Medalists
gold medal	Lin Shidong	China
silver medal	Wang Chuqin	China
bronze medal	Noshad Alamian	Iran
bronze medal	Lin Yun-ju	Chinese Taipei

Table tennis at the 2026 Asian Games – Men's singles was a table tennis event at the 2026 Asian Games, held from 24 to 28 September 2026 at the Sky Hall Toyota. All singles matches were knockout matches, played as best-of-seven games.

Lin Shidong defeated defending champion Wang Chuqin in the final to win his third gold medal and fourth medal of the Asian Games.

== Seeds ==
- Seeding was determined by the International Table Tennis Federation world rankings released on September 14.
1. (China) Wang Chuqin
2. (Japan) Sora Matsushima
3. (Japan) Tomokazu Harimoto
4. (Chinese Taipei) Lin Yun-ju
5. (China) Lin Shidong
6. (South Korea) Jang Woo-jin
7. (South Korea) An Jae-hyun
8. (Hong Kong) Wong Chun Ting
9. (Chinese Taipei) Feng Yi-hsin
10. (India) Manush Shah
11. (India) Manav Thakkar
12. (Kazakhstan) Kirill Gerassimenko
13. (Hong Kong) Chan Ho Wah
14. (Kazakhstan) Alan Kurmangaliyev
15. (Singapore) Izaac Quek
16. (Singapore) Koen Pang

== Knockout stage ==
=== Finals ===
Semifinals
1	Wang Chuqin (CHN)	11	11	9	11	11
Noshad Alamiyan (IRI) (bronze)	4	7	11	4	6
4	Lin Yun-ju (TPE) (bronze)	12	11	8	9	11	6	9
5	Lin Shidong (CHN)	10	9	11	11	9	11	11

Final
1	Wang Chuqin (CHN) (silver)	5	8	11	5
5	Lin Shidong (CHN) (gold)	11	11	13	11

=== Top half ===
==== Section 1 ====
First round
Preechayan T. (THA)	11	11	11	11
Khan M. (PAK)	4	7	6	3
U T. (PRK)	11	11	11	11
Tologonov N. (KGZ)	4	3	3	5
Zheng H. (MAC)	11	8	11	6	5
Choong J. (MAS)	7	11	13	11	11
Saleh M. (BHR)	9	11	11	11	11
Bawm R. (BAN)	11	2	4	8	8

Second round
1	Wang C. (CHN)	3	11	11	8	11	11
Preechayan T. (THA)	11	6	4	11	2	5
U T. (PRK)	4	11	11	11	4	11
11	Thakkar M. (IND)	11	2	7	7	11	3
9	Feng Y. (TPE)	11	11	11	9	11
Choong J. (MAS)	6	5	8	11	7
Saleh M. (BHR)	4	9	4	8
6	Jang W. (KOR)	11	11	11	11

Third round
1	Wang C. (CHN)	11	11	12	11
U T. (PRK)	3	5	10	8
9	Feng Y. (TPE)	11	11	11	11
6	Jang W. (KOR)	7	6	7	8

Quarterfinals
1	Wang C. (CHN)	11	11	11	11
9	Feng Y. (TPE)	5	8	9	6

==== Section 2 ====
First round
Iskandarov S. (UZB)	8	11	11	6	11	13
Myandal T. (MGL)	11	9	7	11	5	11
Ahmed M. (MDV)	2	7	6	8
Alamiyan N. (IRI)	11	11	11	11
Hagberg J. (LAO)	6	15	11	7	5	11	4
16	Pang K. (SGP)	11	13	5	11	11	9	11
Gubran E. (YEM)	11	11	8	11	11
Kapali S. (NEP)	5	8	11	7	6
Ahussein M. (QAT)	11	11	11	11
Junindra M. (INA)	2	7	6	9

Second round
8	Wong C. (HKG)	9	11	11	11	11
Iskandarov S. (UZB)	11	3	7	7	2
Alamiyan N. (IRI)	11	13	11	11
16	Pang K. (SGP)	6	11	4	8
14	Kurmangaliyev A. (KAZ)	11	11	11	11
Gubran E. (YEM)	8	5	9	3
Ahussein M. (QAT)	7	6	4	5
3	Harimoto T. (JPN)	11	11	11	11

Third round
8	Wong C. (HKG)	11	6	7	8	12	5
Alamiyan N. (IRI)	3	11	11	11	10	11
14	Kurmangaliyev A. (KAZ)	3	7	9	2
3	Harimoto T. (JPN)	11	11	11	11

Quarterfinals
Alamiyan N. (IRI)	11	11	3	11	14	6	11
3	Harimoto T. (JPN)	9	7	11	6	16	11	9

=== Bottom half ===
==== Section 3 ====
First round
Rashed R. (BHR)	13	11	11	11
Bilal T. (PAK)	11	4	5	7
Ismail M. (MDV)	8	11	11	3	3
Tancharoen S. (THA)	11	9	13	11	11
13	Chan H. (HKG)	8	11	11	11	11
Negara M. (INA)	11	2	8	6	1
Kasymov A. (KGZ)	9	14	3	11	5	11	6
Aldhubhani M. (YEM)	11	12	11	8	11	6	11
Ri J. (PRK)	11	11	11	11
Dilshodov D. (UZB)	6	2	8	6

Second round
4	Lin Y. (TPE)	11	11	11	11
Rashed R. (BHR)	4	7	8	4
Tancharoen S. (THA)	11	11	9	11	10	6	6
12	Gerassimenko K. (KAZ)	9	7	11	7	12	11	11
13	Chan H. (HKG)	11	11	11	11
Aldhubhani M. (YEM)	3	4	5	6
Ri J. (PRK)	8	11	13	7	11	13
7	An J. (KOR)	11	9	11	11	6	11

Third round
4	Lin Y. (TPE)	11	11	11	11
12	Gerassimenko K. (KAZ)	3	6	6	8
13	Chan H. (HKG)	9	11	11	11	11
Ri J. (PRK)	11	8	2	5	7

Quarterfinals
4	Lin Y. (TPE)	11	11	8	11	11
13	Chan H. (HKG)	7	7	11	9	5

==== Section 4 ====
First round
Mak T. (MAC)	11	13	9	11	12
Maharjan R. (NEP)	5	11	11	3	10
Kulappuwawadu C. (SRI)	7	2	5	8
Faraji B. (IRI)	11	11	11	11
Wong Q. (MAS)	9	12	7	4
10	Shah M. (IND)	11	14	11	11
Vongsa A. (LAO)	2	6	8	12	5
Abdulhussein A. (QAT)	11	11	11	10	11
Ankhbayar B. (MGL)	7	9	11	11	11	11
Ridoy M. (BAN)	11	11	8	6	6	4

Second round
5	Lin S. (CHN)	11	11	11	11
Mak T. (MAC)	9	5	4	2
Faraji B. (IRI)	9	6	6	5
10	Shah M. (IND)	11	11	11	11
15	Quek I. (SGP)	11	11	11	11
Abdulhussein A. (QAT)	3	3	4	7
Ankhbayar B. (MGL)	2	6	7	6
2	Matsushima S. (JPN)	11	11	11	11

Third round
5	Lin S. (CHN)	11	11	11	12
10	Shah M. (IND)	4	4	9	10
15	Quek I. (SGP)	4	11	7	14	5	8
2	Matsushima S. (JPN)	11	6	11	12	11	11

Quarterfinals
5	Lin S. (CHN)	7	11	11	11	11	11
2	Matsushima S. (JPN)	11	3	7	13	7	6
