= Lin Shidong =

Chinese table tennis player (born 2005)

Personal information
- Born: 18 April 2005 (age 21) Danzhou, Hainan, China
- Height: 168 cm (5 ft 6 in)

Sport
- Sport: Table tennis
- Club: Huangshi TTC
- Playing style: Right-handed, shakehand grip
- Highest ranking: 1 (11 February 2025)
- Current ranking: 9 (5 October 2026)
Medal record
Men's table tennis
Representing China
World Championships
Gold medal – first place	2026 London	Team
Bronze medal – third place	2023 Durban	Mixed doubles
World Cup
Gold medal – first place	2024 Chengdu	Mixed team
Gold medal – first place	2025 Chengdu	Mixed team
Silver medal – second place	2025 Macao	Singles
Asian Games
Gold medal – first place	2026 Aichi-Nagoya	Singles
Gold medal – first place	2026 Aichi-Nagoya	Doubles
Gold medal – first place	2026 Aichi-Nagoya	Mixed doubles
Silver medal – second place	2026 Aichi-Nagoya	Team
Asian Championships
Gold medal – first place	2024 Astana	Mixed doubles
Gold medal – first place	2024 Astana	Team
Gold medal – first place	2025 Bhubaneswar	Team
Gold medal – first place	2026 Tashkent	Doubles
Gold medal – first place	2026 Tashkent	Team
Silver medal – second place	2024 Astana	Singles
Asian Cup
Bronze medal – third place	2025 Shenzhen	Singles

Lin Shidong (Chinese: 林诗栋; born 18 April 2005) is a Chinese table tennis player and the world number 1 from February to September 2025.

== Career ==
Lin was picked for the Hainan provincial team in 2015. After winning the singles title at the national youth championships in 2020, Lin joined the Chinese national second team. He is the first person from Hainan province to be a member of the Chinese national team.

In 2022, Lin was promoted to the national first team. He won his first WTT title at the WTT Feeder European Summer Series 2022 held in Budapest. He represented China at the 2022 ITTF World Youth Championships, winning four gold medals including the U-19 singles title.

In 2023, Lin Shidong won the WTT Contender series event in Amman. He paired with Kuai Man in the mixed doubles event at the 2023 World Championships, winning bronze in his first appearance at the Championships. After claiming the men's singles title at the All China Table Tennis Championships, Lin successfully defended his four titles at the 2023 ITTF World Youth Championships.

After the 2024 Summer Olympics, Lin Shidong won the men's singles titles at the WTT Contender Almaty and WTT Champions Macao in September. He continued his success in October by defeating Ma Long in the final to win the WTT China Smash. His winning streak ended in the men's singles final at the Asian Championships, where he was defeated by Tomokazu Harimoto. Lin subsequently claimed two additional singles titles at the WTT Contender Muscat and WTT Champions Frankfurt.

In 2025, Lin won the WTT Singapore Smash title by defeating Liang Jingkun in the final, and subsequently reached the No. 1 position in the ITTF world rankings in February. However, after becoming the world's top-ranked men's singles player, Lin experienced a series of setbacks in international competitions. He competed at the ITTF Men's World Cup, advancing to the final where he finished as runner-up to Hugo Calderano. At the 2025 World Championships, Lin was the only male Chinese player to compete in three events and entered as the top seed in both singles and mixed doubles (with Kuai Man). He was eliminated in the quarterfinals of all three events and did not medal.

In the summer of 2025, Lin participated in the WTT United States Smash, where he lost in the semi-finals against Tomokazu Harimoto 3–4. Then Lin joined the WTT Champions Yokohama and had a surprising loss to Dang Qiu in the round of 16. The next tournament was the WTT Europe Smash in Sweden, where Lin reached the final after successively taking revenge against Dang Qiu in the quarterfinal 4–0, before beating French Simon Gauzy in a thrilling 4–3 match. In the final, Lin lost 3–4 to Truls Möregårdh. Before the last Grand Smash, Lin went to play in the WTT Champions Macao but lost 3–4 in the quarterfinals against Anders Lind. Meanwhile, his compatriot Wang Chuqin won the title, earning 1000 ranking points and surpassing Lin to become the world No. 1 again.

Despite his drop in the rankings, Lin still helped the Chinese national team capture the men's team title at the 2025 Asian Championships and the mixed team title at the World Cup. Lin's singles title drought extended into 2026, and he was even forced to withdraw from the Men's World Cup in late March due to an injury. Nevertheless, as a member of the national team, he made his debut at the World Team Table Tennis Championships a month later. At this historic centenary edition of the World Championships, Lin entered as the team's second-highest-ranked player; however, during the group stage, he suffered consecutive defeats to South Korea's Oh Jun-sung, as well as Sweden's Elias Ranefur and Anton Källberg, which led to the Chinese men's team losing back-to-back ties against South Korea and Sweden. Despite these setbacks, he continued to feature in the knockout stage and ultimately helped the Chinese men's team capture the championship.

During the 2026 Asian Games in September 2026, Lin competed in four events. In the men's team final, the Chinese team lost to the Japanese team with a total score of 2-3, earning the silver medal. In the mixed doubles final, Lin partnered with Kuai Man to sweep their teammates Wang Chuqin and Sun Yingsha with a 4-0 victory, winning the mixed doubles gold medal. In the men's doubles final, Lin partnered with Huang Youzheng to defeat Japan's Hiroto Shinozuka and Tomokazu Harimoto with a score of 4-2, securing the men's doubles gold medal. In the men's singles final, Lin swept his teammate Wang Chuqin 4-0 to claim the men's singles gold medal, becoming "triple crown" of the 2026 Asian Games table tennis events alongside Kuai Man and Wang Manyu. The single title drought lasting for 18 months has come to the end.

== Singles titles ==
Year	Tournament	Final opponent	Score	Ref
2022	WTT Feeder European Summer Series	(China) Xiang Peng	4–0	
2023	WTT Contender Amman	(Germany) Dimitrij Ovtcharov	4–0	
2024	WTT Contender Almaty	(South Korea) Oh Jun-sung	4–3	
2024	WTT Champions Macao	(Germany) Dang Qiu	4–0	
2024	WTT China Smash	(China) Ma Long	4–3	
2024	WTT Contender Muscat	(China) Wen Ruibo	4–1	
2024	WTT Champions Frankfurt	(Sweden) Anton Källberg	4–1	
2025	WTT Singapore Smash	(China) Liang Jingkun	4–2	
2026	Asian Games	(China) Wang Chuqin	4–0	
