= Table tennis at the 2026 Asian Games – Women's doubles =

Women's doubles at the 2026 Asian Games
- Venue: Sky Hall Toyota
- Dates: 21–28 September 2026
- Competitors: 72 from 22 nations

Medalists
gold medal	Kuai Man; Wang Manyu	China
silver medal	Hina Hayata; Miwa Harimoto	Japan
bronze medal	Orawan Paranang; Suthasini Sawettabut	Thailand
bronze medal	Doo Hoi Kem; Ng Wing Lam	Hong Kong

Table tennis at the 2026 Asian Games – Women's doubles was one of the events of the table tennis competition at the 2026 Asian Games. Matches through the quarterfinals were played as best-of-five, while the semifinals and final were played as best-of-seven.

== Seeds ==
- Doubles seeding was determined by adding the individual doubles world rankings on September 14, 2026; the lower the sum, the higher the seeding.
1. (Japan) Hina Hayata / Miwa Harimoto
2. (China) Kuai Man / Wang Manyu
3. (Hong Kong) Doo Hoi Kem / Ng Wing Lam
4. (South Korea) Shin Yu-bin / Joo Cheon-hui
5. (India) Yashaswini Ghorpade / Diya Chitale
6. (Thailand) Orawan Paranang / Suthasini Sawettabut
7. (Singapore) Ser Lin Qian / Loy Ming Ying
8. (Japan) Rin Mende / Miyu Nagasaki
9. (South Korea) Lee Eun-hye / Kim Na-yeong
10. (China) Chen Yi / Fan Shuhan
11. (Chinese Taipei) Wu Ying-syuan / Chen Szu-yu
12. (Hong Kong) Su Tsz Tung / Lee Hoi Man
13. (Singapore) Chloe Lai / Tan Zhao Yun
14. (Chinese Taipei) Yeh Yi-tian / Cheng I-ching
15. (India) Sreeja Akula / Syndrela Das
16. (Kazakhstan) Sarvinoz Mirkadirova / Zauresh Akasheva

== Knockout stage ==
=== Finals ===
Semifinals
1	Hayata H. (JPN); Harimoto M. (JPN)	11	11	11	11
3	Doo H. (HKG); Ng W. (HKG)	6	5	4	6
6	Paranang O. (THA); Sawettabut S. (THA)	6	8	5	6
2	Kuai M. (CHN); Wang M. (CHN)	11	11	11	11

Final
1	Hayata H. (JPN); Harimoto M. (JPN)	0	11	4	9
2	Kuai M. (CHN); Wang M. (CHN)	11	13	11	11

=== Section 1 ===
First round
Mahi N. (BAN); Tushi S. (BAN)	1	2	6
Kim K. (PRK); Cha S. (PRK)	11	11	11

Second round
1	Hayata H. (JPN); Harimoto M. (JPN)	11	13	11
Wonglakhon P. (THA); Vijitviriyagul K. (THA)	2	11	9
Kuan C. (MAC); Leong O. (MAC)	8	5	11	8
11	Wu Y. (TPE); Chen S. (TPE)	11	11	6	11
10	Chen Y. (CHN); Fan S. (CHN)	6	11	11	11
Kim K. (PRK); Cha S. (PRK)	11	9	5	9
Ashtari M. (IRI); Iloukhani S. (IRI)	2	2	4
5	Ghorpade Y. (IND); Chitale D. (IND)	11	11	11

Third round
1	Hayata H. (JPN); Harimoto M. (JPN)	11	11	11
11	Wu Y. (TPE); Chen S. (TPE)	8	4	13
10	Chen Y. (CHN); Fan S. (CHN)	11	11	11
5	Ghorpade Y. (IND); Chitale D. (IND)	7	5	8

Quarterfinals
1	Hayata H. (JPN); Harimoto M. (JPN)	11	11	12
10	Chen Y. (CHN); Fan S. (CHN)	8	5	10

=== Section 2 ===
First round
Rasmi C. (INA); Putri C. (INA)	14	11	9	9	11
Nazim A. (MDV); F. Ali (MDV)	12	8	11	11	9

Second round
7	Ser L. (SGP); Loy M. (SGP)	11	11	11
Ser-Od A. (MGL); Batunkh B. (MGL)	7	4	7
Rasmi C. (INA); Putri C. (INA)	12	15	5	15	11
16	Mirkadirova S. (KAZ); Akasheva Z. (KAZ)	14	13	11	13	3
9	Lee E. (KOR); Kim N. (KOR)	11	11	11
Shaikh S. (QAT); Al-Malki F. (QAT)	2	8	3
Kamalova A. (UZB); Erkebaeva A. (UZB)	14	1	5	5
3	Doo H. (HKG); Ng W. (HKG)	12	11	11	11

Third round
7	Ser L. (SGP); Loy M. (SGP)	11	11	11
Rasmi C. (INA); Putri C. (INA)	8	3	8
9	Lee E. (KOR); Kim N. (KOR)	11	5	11	4	5
3	Doo H. (HKG); Ng W. (HKG)	4	11	8	11	11

Quarterfinals
7	Ser L. (SGP); Loy M. (SGP)	4	2	7
3	Doo H. (HKG); Ng W. (HKG)	11	11	11

=== Section 3 ===
First round
Pyon S. (PRK); Choe J. (PRK)	11	11	11
Khan F. (PAK); Khan A. (PAK)	5	1	4

Second round
4	Shin Y. (KOR); Joo C. (KOR)	11	11	11
Nafiz A. (MDV); Ibrahim M. (MDV)	4	2	3
Thapa E. (NEP); Shrestha N. (NEP)
13	Lai C. (SGP); Tan Z. (SGP)	w/o
14	Yeh Y. (TPE); Cheng I. (TPE)	11	7	11	14
Pyon S. (PRK); Choe J. (PRK)	1	11	9	12
Chiri B. (LBN); Azar T. (LBN)	3	1	5
6	Paranang O. (THA); Sawettabut S. (THA)	11	11	11

Third round
4	Shin Y. (KOR); Joo C. (KOR)	8	11	11	11
13	Lai C. (SGP); Tan Z. (SGP)	11	3	5	6
14	Yeh Y. (TPE); Cheng I. (TPE)	1	6	13
6	Paranang O. (THA); Sawettabut S. (THA)	11	11	15

Quarterfinals
4	Shin Y. (KOR); Joo C. (KOR)	8	11	11	4	10
6	Paranang O. (THA); Sawettabut S. (THA)	11	9	7	11	12

=== Section 4 ===
First round
Sudarnita K. (INA); Maharani N. (INA)	11	11	11
Abboud R. (SYR); Zaza H. (SYR)	7	3	8

Second round
8	Mende R. (JPN); Nagasaki M. (JPN)	11	11	11
Mohamed A. (QAT); Ali M. (QAT)	2	2	3
Sudarnita K. (INA); Maharani N. (INA)	8	3	6
12	Su T. T. (HKG); Lee H. M. (HKG)	11	11	11
15	Akula S. (IND); Das S. (IND)	11	11	12
Batmunkh B. (MGL); Sanjaa B. (MGL)	5	4	10
Romanovskaya A. (KAZ); Zhaxlykova A. (KAZ)	1	1	3
2	Kuai M. (CHN); Wang M. (CHN)	11	11	11

Third round
8	Mende R. (JPN); Nagasaki M. (JPN)	11	11	11
12	Su T. T. (HKG); Lee H. M. (HKG)	7	9	9
15	Akula S. (IND); Das S. (IND)	6	7	7
2	Kuai M. (CHN); Wang M. (CHN)	11	11	11

Quarterfinals
8	Mende R. (JPN); Nagasaki M. (JPN)	5	2	7
2	Kuai M. (CHN); Wang M. (CHN)	11	11	11
