= Sora Matsushima =

Japanese table tennis player (born 2007)

Personal information
- Born: 29 April 2007 (age 19) Kyoto, Japan
- Height: 172 cm (5 ft 8 in)

Sport
- Sport: Table tennis
- Club: Okayama Rivets (T.League)
- Playing style: Left-handed shakehand grip
- Highest ranking: 1 (October 2026)
- Current ranking: 1 (5 October 2026)
Medal record
Men's table tennis
Representing Japan
World Championships
Silver medal – second place	2026 London	Team
World Cup
Silver medal – second place	2025 Chengdu	Mixed team
Silver medal – second place	2026 Macao	Singles
Asian Games
Gold medal – first place	2026 Aichi-Nagoya	Team
Bronze medal – third place	2026 Aichi-Nagoya	Doubles
Asian Championships
Gold medal – first place	2026 Tashkent	Mixed doubles
Bronze medal – third place	2025 Bhubaneswar	Team
Bronze medal – third place	2026 Tashkent	Team

Sora Matsushima (松島 輝空, Matsushima Sora; born 29 April 2007) is a Japanese professional table tennis player. He is the current world rank 1 in men's singles, as well as the youngest male player in the current top 10 of the ITTF World Ranking.

In August 2026, at the age of 19 years, 5 months, and 6 days, he became the youngest ever world rank 1 in men's singles, surpassing the previous record set by Lin Shidong, and the first Japanese player to hold the top spot since Seiji Ono in July 1980.

== Career ==
Matsushima won the U-15 boys' singles title at the 2021 ITTF World Youth Championships. On that occasion, he also captured the U-15 boys' doubles title with Félix Lebrun and the U-15 mixed doubles title with Miwa Harimoto. In addition, Matsushima was a member of the Japanese U-19 boys' team, which won the bronze medal in the tournament.

At the senior level, Matsushima reached the men's singles final at the WTT Contender Rio de Janeiro 2023, where he was defeated by Mattias Falck in six games. He was later selected as a member of the Japanese national team for the 2024 World Team Championships, recording three wins and one loss. Matsushima was also named a reserve player for the Japanese men's team at the 2024 Summer Olympics.

In 2025, Matsushima won the men's singles title at the All Japan Table Tennis Championships, defeating Tomokazu Harimoto in the semifinals and Hiroto Shinozuka in the final. He later claimed the men's singles title at the WTT Contender Taiyuan. In November, Matsuhima set new personal milestones on the pro level in a span of two weeks. He first finished as runner-up at WTT Champions Montpellier, where he lost to Truls Möregardh and later crowned champion at WTT Champions Frankfurt, defeating local player Dang Qiu. This victory also propelled him into the top ten of the men's singles world rankings.

In 2026, Matsushima successfully defended his men's singles title at the All Japan Table Tennis Championships by once again defeating Tomokazu Harimoto and Hiroto Shinozuka in consecutive fashion. Later that year at the ITTF World Cup, he reached the men's singles final after securing successive victories over Jang Woo-jin, Truls Möregårdh, and Lin Yun-ju. In the final, he pushed Wang Chuqin to a deciding seventh game before ultimately falling to claim the silver medal. Matsushima later helped the Japanese men's team advance to the finals at the World Team Championships, ultimately securing a silver medal. He then went on to capture the men's singles title at the WTT United States Smash.

== Singles titles ==
Year	Tournament	Final opponent	Score	Ref
2025	WTT Contender Taiyuan	(South Korea) An Jae-hyun	4–3	
2025	WTT Champions Frankfurt	(Germany) Dang Qiu	4–1	
2026	WTT United States Smash	(Individual Neutral Athletes) Vladimir Sidorenko	4–2	
2026	WTT China Smash	(Chinese Taipei) Lin Yun-Ju	4–3	
