= 2026 World Team Table Tennis Championships =

2026 edition of the World Team Table Tennis Championships

ITTF World Team Table Tennis Championships Finals London 2026

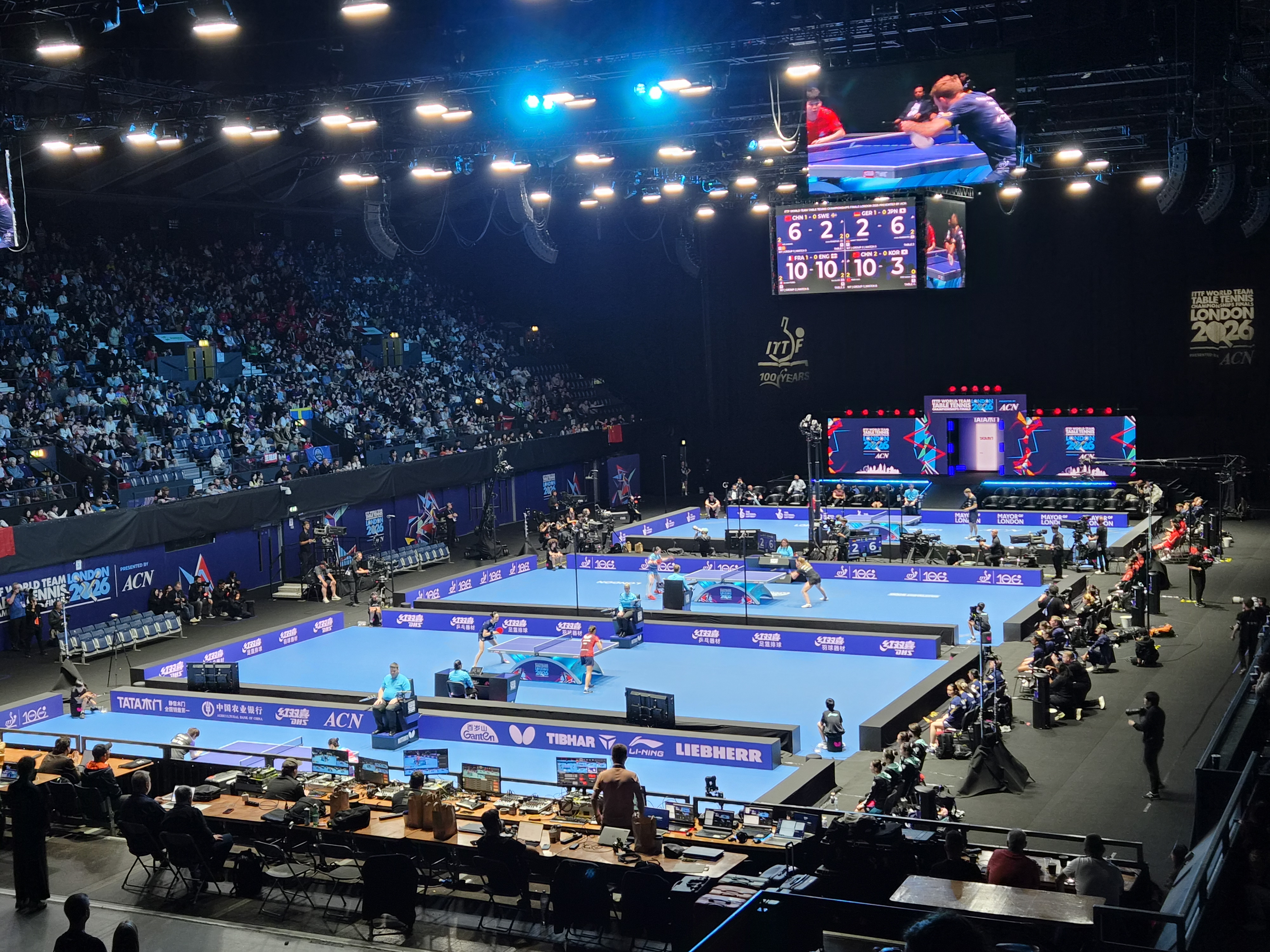
- Ovo Arena during the Championships
- Venue: Copper Box Arena; OVO Arena Wembley
- Location: London, England
- Dates: 28 April – 10 May

Champions
- Men: China
- Women: China

The 2026 World Team Table Tennis Championships was held in London, England from 28 April to 10 May 2026. This centenary edition returned to the city of its inception, featuring 64 men's and 64 women's teams. The tournament began with the group stage at the Copper Box Arena (28 April – 1 May), before moving to the OVO Arena Wembley for the remaining group matches (2–3 May) and the knockout stage (4–10 May).

== Qualification ==
Number of teams eligible to compete for the trophy in each team event was 64.

Continental Stage – 52 teams qualified from the Continental Stage. The continental quota allocation is the following: 8 for Africa, 8 for the Americas, 16 for Asia, 16 for Europe, and 4 for Oceania.

11 places were allocated to the highest ranked not-yet qualified teams on the November ITTF WTR 2025.

Host nation – spot was guaranteed. If the host nation was already qualified through the continental stage, the host quota was reallocated to the ITTF WTR Nov 2025.

Qualification	Men's team	Women's team
Host nation	England	England
Africa (8); 2025 African Championships	Egypt; Nigeria; Algeria; Tunisia; Madagascar; Benin; Morocco; Togo	Egypt; Nigeria; Algeria; ~~Tunisia~~; Ghana; South Africa; Madagascar; Uganda
Americas (8); 2025 Pan American Championships	Argentina; Brazil; Canada; Mexico; Chile; Puerto Rico; United States; Guatemala	Brazil; Canada; Chile; Mexico; Puerto Rico; United States; Argentina; Guatemala
Asia (16); 2025 Asian Championships	China; Hong Kong; Japan; Chinese Taipei; South Korea; India; North Korea; ~~Iran~~; Singapore; Kazakhstan; Thailand; Malaysia; Qatar; Mongolia; Uzbekistan; Bahrain	China; Japan; South Korea; Singapore; North Korea; Thailand; Hong Kong; India; Chinese Taipei; Malaysia; ~~Iran~~; Sri Lanka; Kazakhstan; Macau; Mongolia; Syria
Europe (16); 2025 European Championships	France; Romania; Germany; Slovenia; Sweden; Portugal; Croatia; Belgium; Poland; Serbia; Moldova; Spain; Denmark; Greece; Turkey; Slovakia	Germany; Romania; Netherlands; Portugal; Slovakia; Poland; Ukraine; Sweden; Serbia; Croatia; Austria; Czech Republic; Luxembourg; Hungary; Spain; France
Oceania (4); 2025 Oceanian Championships	Australia; New Zealand; Tahiti; New Caledonia	Australia; ~~New Zealand~~; ~~Tahiti~~; ~~Cook Islands~~
ITTF World team ranking (11)	Austria; Hungary; Czech Republic; ~~Cuba~~; ~~Ecuador~~; South Africa; Ivory Coast; Cameroon; Fiji; Angola; Peru	Italy; Cuba; Uzbekistan; Angola; ~~Nauru~~; Ethiopia; Wales; Turkey; ~~Venezuela~~; DR Congo; ~~Ecuador~~
Reallocation	Saudi Arabia; Luxembourg; Italy	Dominican Republic; Rwanda; Benin; Costa Rica; Slovenia; Namibia; ~~Trinidad and Tobago~~; Switzerland; Greece

== Medal summary ==
=== Medal table ===
* Host nation (England)

Rank	Nation	Gold	Silver	Bronze	Total
1	China	2	0	0	2
2	Japan	0	2	0	2
3	Chinese Taipei	0	0	1	1
3	France	0	0	1	1
3	Germany	0	0	1	1
3	Romania	0	0	1	1
Totals (6 entries)		2	2	4	8

=== Medalists ===
Event	Gold	Silver	Bronze
Men's team	China; Wang Chuqin; Lin Shidong; Xiang Peng; Zhou Qihao; Liang Jingkun	Japan; Tomokazu Harimoto; Sora Matsushima; Shunsuke Togami; Yukiya Uda; Hiroto Shinozuka	Chinese Taipei; Lin Yun-ju; Feng Yi-hsin; Kuo Guan-hong; Hung Jing-kai; Hsu Hsien-chia
Men's team	China; Wang Chuqin; Lin Shidong; Xiang Peng; Zhou Qihao; Liang Jingkun	Japan; Tomokazu Harimoto; Sora Matsushima; Shunsuke Togami; Yukiya Uda; Hiroto Shinozuka	France; Félix Lebrun; Alexis Lebrun; Simon Gauzy; Flavien Coton; Thibault Poret
Women's team	China; Sun Yingsha; Wang Manyu; Chen Xingtong; Kuai Man; Wang Yidi	Japan; Miwa Harimoto; Hina Hayata; Honoka Hashimoto; Miyu Nagasaki; Rin Mende	Romania; Bernadette Szőcs; Elizabeta Samara; Andreea Dragoman; Elena Zaharia; Adina Diaconu
Women's team	China; Sun Yingsha; Wang Manyu; Chen Xingtong; Kuai Man; Wang Yidi	Japan; Miwa Harimoto; Hina Hayata; Honoka Hashimoto; Miyu Nagasaki; Rin Mende	Germany; Sabine Winter; Han Ying; Nina Mittelham; Annett Kaufmann; Yuan Wan
