= Xiang Peng =

Chinese table tennis player

Personal information
- Native name: 向鹏
- Born: 7 March 2003 (age 23) Wenling, Zhejiang, China

Sport
- Sport: Table tennis
- Playing style: Right-handed shakehand grip
- Highest ranking: 8 (27 May 2025)
- Current ranking: 35 (2 November 2026)
Medal record
Men's table tennis
Representing China
World Championships
Gold medal – first place	2026 London	Team
Asian Games
Silver medal – second place	2026 Aichi-Nagoya	Team
Bronze medal – third place	2026 Aichi-Nagoya	Doubles
Asian Championships
Gold medal – first place	2025 Bhubaneswar	Team
Gold medal – first place	2026 Tashkent	Team

Xiang Peng (Chinese: 向鹏; pinyin: Xiàng Péng, born 7 March 2003) is a Chinese table tennis player.

== Career ==
Xiang entered the Zhejiang provincial team in 2014. After the 2017 National Games of China, Xiang entered the Chinese national second team through trials. He won two gold medals in boys' doubles and boys' team events, respectively, at the 2018 World Junior Championships, as well as a bronze medal in boys' singles. Xiang was promoted to the Chinese national first team in 2019, and won his first senior singles title at the 2019 ITTF Challenge Plus North American Open. He continued his success in junior tournaments by winning the singles title at the 2019 World Junior Championships and the 2021 World Youth Championships.

In 2024, Xiang clinched the men's singles title at the WTT Feeder Olomouc. In 2025, he won the men's singles title at the WTT Champions Incheon and broke into the world top 10 of the rankings.

== Singles titles ==
Year	Tournament	Final opponent	Score	Ref
2019	ITTF Challenge Plus, North American Open	(France) Can Akkuzu	4–2	
2024	WTT Feeder Olomouc	(China) Zeng Beixun	3–0	
2025	WTT Champions Incheon	(South Korea) Lee Sang-su	4–0	
