= Anna Hursey =

Welsh table tennis player (born 2006)

Personal information
- Born: 22 June 2006 (age 20) Carmarthen, Wales
- Height: 164 cm (5 ft 5 in) (2022)
- Weight: 63 kg (139 lb) (2022)

Sport
- Sport: Table tennis
- Highest ranking: 36 (28 September 2026)
- Current ranking: 36 (28 September 2026)
Medal record
Women's table tennis
Representing Wales
Welsh National Championships
Silver medal – second place	2020	Women's singles
Commonwealth Games
Bronze medal – third place	2022 Birmingham	Women's doubles
World Youth Championships
Silver medal – second place	2023 Nova Gorica	U19 girls' doubles
Bronze medal – third place	2021 Gaia	U15 girls' doubles

Anna Hursey (born 22 June 2006) is a Welsh table tennis player. She is thought to be the youngest person to represent Wales at senior level in any sport, having been aged just 10 when she competed for Wales in a European Championship qualification match against Kosovo in 2017.

Hursey competed at the 2018 Commonwealth Games in Gold Coast, Australia, and the 2022 Commonwealth Games in Birmingham, England, where she came third in the women's doubles event.

== Personal life ==
Hursey was born in Carmarthen, Wales, and attended Cardiff High School. She left Cardiff High School after Year 8. Hursey's mother is Chinese, and in 2019, Hursey moved to Tianjin, China to take up table tennis full-time. She is a United Nations ambassador for climate change in sport, and in 2021, Hursey spoke with US President Joe Biden about climate change.

== Career ==
Hursey began playing table tennis at the age of five. In 2017, Hursey, aged 10, competed for Wales in a European Championship qualification match against Kosovo. In doing so, she is believed to be the youngest person to represent Wales at senior level in any sport. In the same year, she competed at the 2017 World Cadet Challenge. She competed for Wales at the 2018 Commonwealth Games in Gold Coast, Australia. She was the youngest competitor in Commonwealth Games history. Hursey was nominated for the 2018 BBC Young Sports Personality of the Year award, which was won by Kare Adenegan.

After the 2020 Welsh National Championships, in which Hursey finished second to Charlotte Carey, she was unable to return to China as the Chinese borders were closed due to the COVID-19 pandemic. She instead trained in Peterborough, England. Hursey has been ranked the number one ranked Welsh under-15 woman, and number two ranked Welsh woman of any age. At the 2021 ITTF World Youth Championships, Hursey and Portugal's Matilde Pinto came third in the under-15 girls' doubles event.

Hursey was selected in the Wales team for the 2022 Commonwealth Games; Hursey and Charlotte Carey came third in the women's doubles event at the Games, the first time that Welsh women had won a Commonwealth Games table tennis medal. She was part of the Wales team that finished fourth in the women's team competition, and she lost in the quarter-finals of the women's singles event.

Hursey was selected for the women's singles event at the 2024 Summer Olympics. She went out in the first round to 18th seed Manika Batra from India.
