= Hiroto Shinozuka =

Japanese table tennis player (born 2003)

Personal information
- Born: 23 December 2003 (age 22) Aichi, Japan
- Height: 165 cm (5 ft 5 in)

Sport
- Sport: Table tennis
- Club: Ryukyu Asteeda (T.League)
- Playing style: Left-handed shakehand grip
- Highest ranking: 18 (5 October 2026)
- Current ranking: 20 (2 November 2026)
Medal record
Men's table tennis
Representing Japan
World Championships
Gold medal – first place	2025 Doha	Doubles¨
Silver medal – second place	2026 London	Team
World Cup
Silver medal – second place	2025 Chengdu	Mixed team
Asian Games
Gold medal – first place	2026 Aichi-Nagoya	Team
Silver medal – second place	2026 Aichi-Nagoya	Doubles
Asian Championships
Bronze medal – third place	2021 Doha	Team
Bronze medal – third place	2024 Astana	Singles
Bronze medal – third place	2024 Astana	Doubles
Bronze medal – third place	2025 Bhubaneswar	Team
Bronze medal – third place	2026 Tashkent	Team

Hiroto Shinozuka (Japanese: 篠塚大登; born 23 December 2003) is a Japanese table tennis player. He competed at the 2024 Summer Olympics.
