= Kuai Man =

Chinese table tennis player (born 2004)

Personal information
- Born: 7 February 2004 (age 22) Yancheng, Jiangsu, China

Sport
- Sport: Table tennis
- Playing style: Left-handed, shakehand grip
- Highest ranking: 3 (16 December 2025)
- Current ranking: 4 (28 September 2026)
Medal record
Women's table tennis
Representing China
World Championships
| Gold medal – first place | 2025 Doha | Doubles |
| Gold medal – first place | 2026 London | Team |
| Bronze medal – third place | 2023 Durban | Mixed doubles |
World Cup
| Gold medal – first place | 2024 Chengdu | Mixed team |
| Gold medal – first place | 2025 Chengdu | Mixed team |
| Silver medal – second place | 2025 Macao | Singles |
Asian Games
| Gold medal – first place | 2026 Aichi-Nagoya | Team |
| Gold medal – first place | 2026 Aichi-Nagoya | Mixed doubles |
| Gold medal – first place | 2026 Aichi-Nagoya | Doubles |
Asian Championships
| Gold medal – first place | 2024 Astana | Mixed doubles |
| Gold medal – first place | 2025 Bhubaneswar | Team |
| Gold medal – first place | 2026 Tashkent | Doubles |
| Silver medal – second place | 2024 Astana | Team |
| Silver medal – second place | 2026 Tashkent | Team |
| Bronze medal – third place | 2024 Astana | Doubles |
| Bronze medal – third place | 2026 Tashkent | Singles |
Asian Cup
| Bronze medal – third place | 2025 Shenzhen | Singles |
| Bronze medal – third place | 2026 Haikou | Singles |

Kuai Man (Chinese: 蒯曼; pinyin: Kuǎi Màn; born 7 February 2004) is a Chinese table tennis player. She won the U-19 girls' singles event at the ITTF World Youth Championships in 2021 and 2023.

== Singles titles ==
| Year | Tournament | Final opponent | Score | Ref |
|---|---|---|---|---|
| 2022 | WTT Contender Muscat | (China) Fan Siqi | 4–1 | |
| 2023 | WTT Feeder Amman | (France) Audrey Zarif | 3–0 | |
| 2023 | WTT Contender Almaty | (China) Fan Siqi | 4–0 | |
| 2024 | WTT Contender Muscat | (China) Qian Tianyi | 4–2 | |
| 2025 | WTT Star Contender Doha | (Japan) Miyuu Kihara | 4–0 | |
