= Rin Mende =

Japanese table tennis player

Personal information
- Born: 31 December 2007 (age 18) Okayama, Japan
- Height: 164 cm (5 ft 5 in)

Sport
- Sport: Table tennis
- Current ranking: 86 (28 September 2026)
Medal record
Women's table tennis
Representing Japan
World Championships
Silver medal – second place	2026 London	Team
Asian Games
Silver medal – second place	2026 Aichi-Nagoya	Team

Rin Mende (面手 凛, Mende Rin; born 31 December 2007) is a Japanese table tennis player. She was part of her country's team at the 2026 World Team Table Tennis Championships, winning a silver medal.
