= Miłosz Redzimski =

Polish table tennis player

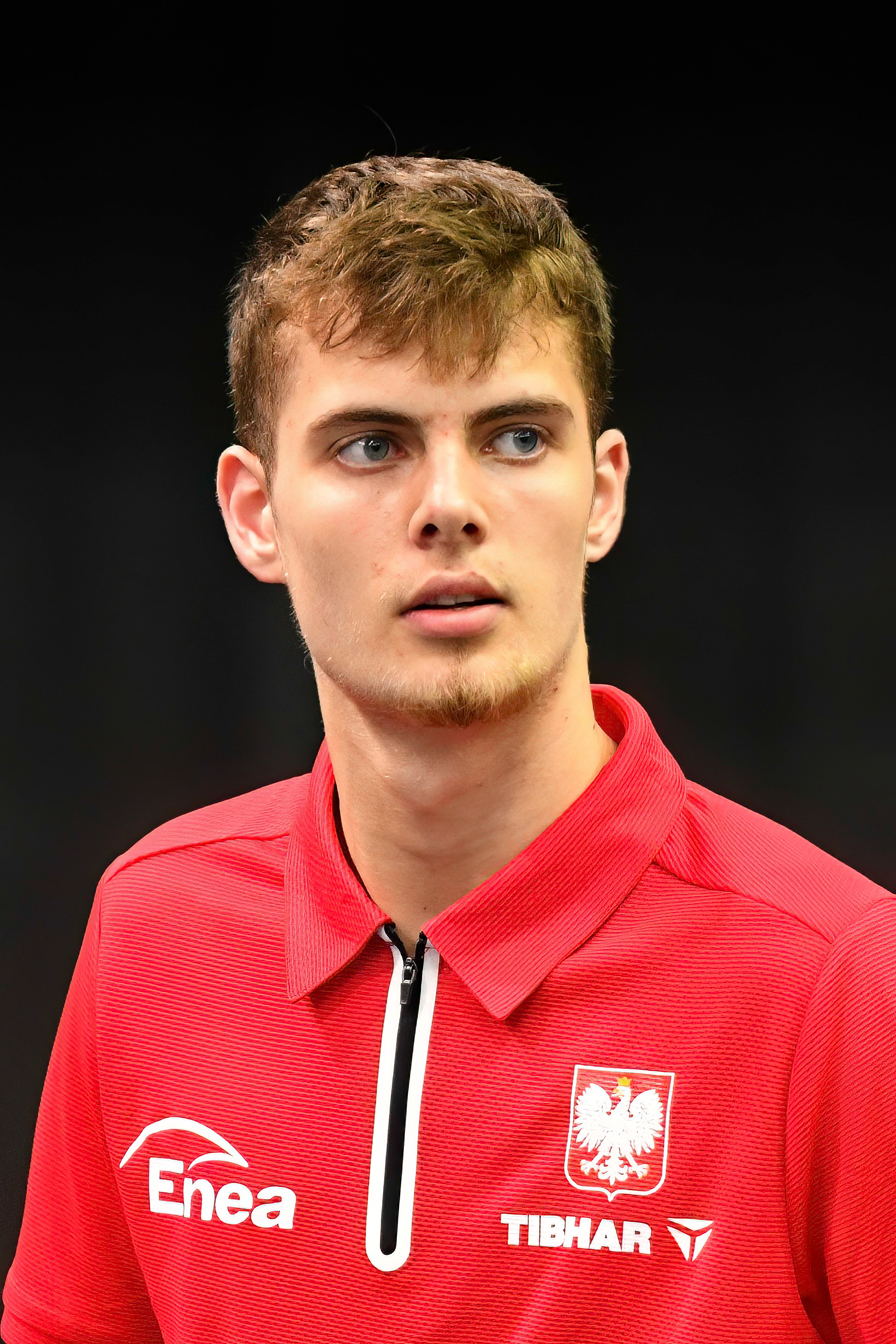

Personal information
- Nationality: Polish
- Born: 10 September 2006 (age 19)

Sport
- Sport: Table tennis
- Current ranking: 44 (15 July 2025)

Miłosz Redzimski (born 10 September 2006) is a Polish table tennis player, Olympian at the 2024 Paris Olympics, and European U-21 champion.

== Participation in International competitions ==
Miłosz Redzimski participated in various international competitions. In 2024, he competed in the Men's singles event at the 2024 Summer Olympics, reaching the 1/32 final. He also took part in the World Championships, where in 2022, the Polish team competed in Chengdu but only reached the 1/16 final in the team event. The same result was achieved in the 2024 World Championships held in Busan.

In the European Under-21 Championships, Miłosz had notable achievements:

- In 2022, he won a bronze medal in the singles event in Cluj-Napoca.
- In 2023, he secured a gold medal in the singles event and a bronze medal in mixed doubles with Anna Brzyska, both held in Sarajevo.
- In 2024, he continued his success by winning gold medals in both the singles and doubles events, with the doubles victory alongside Maciej Kubik, in Skopje.
