= 2024 in table tennis =

This page lists notable table tennis events taking place in 2024.

== Olympic Games ==
- July 26 – August 11: 2024 Summer Olympics in Paris
  - Men's singles: (China) Fan Zhendong
  - Women's singles: (China) Chen Meng
  - Mixed doubles: (China) Wang Chuqin & (China) Sun Yingsha
  - Men's team: (gold) China; (silver) Sweden; (bronze) France
  - Women's team: (gold) China; (silver) Japan; (bronze) South Korea

== ITTF Championships ==
Senior

- February 16–25: 2024 World Team Table Tennis Championships in Busan
  - Men's tournament:
    (gold) : China
    (silver) : France
    (bronze) : South Korea
    (bronze) : Chinese Taipei
  - Women's tournament:
    (gold) : China
    (silver) : Japan
    (bronze) : France
    (bronze) : Hong Kong
- April 15–21: 2024 ITTF Men's World Cup in (Macau) Macao
  - Winners: (China) Ma Long
- April 15–21: 2024 ITTF Women's World Cup in (Macau) Macao
  - Winners: (China) Sun Yingsha
- December 1–8: 2024 ITTF Mixed Team World Cup in Chengdu
  - Mixed Team:
    (gold) : China
    (silver) : South Korea
    (bronze) : Hong Kong
    4th: Romania

Youth

- November 22–29: 2024 ITTF World Youth Championships in (Sweden) Helsingborg

- U19 boys' singles: (China) Huang Youzheng
- U19 girls' singles: (Germany) Annett Kaufmann
- U19 boys' doubles: (China) Wen Ruibo & Huang Youzheng
- U19 girls' doubles: (China) Zong Geman & Qin Yuxuan
- U19 mixed doubles: (China) Huang Youzheng & Zong Geman
- U19 boys' team: China
- U19 girls' team: South Korea
- U15 boys' singles: (China) Li Hechen
- U15 girls' singles: (China) Yao Ruixuan
- U15 boys' doubles: (China) Li Hechen & Tang Yiren
- U15 girls' doubles: (Chinese Taipei) Wu Ying-syuan & Chen Min-hsin
- U15 mixed doubles: (China) Li Hechen & Yao Ruixuan
- U15 boys' team: China
- U15 girls' team: China

== Continental table tennis championships ==
=== Africa ===
Senior

- March 4–10: 2023 African Games in (Ghana) Accra
- May 11–12: 2024 ITTF Africa Cup Cup in (Rwanda) Kigali
  - Winners: (Nigeria) Quadri Aruna (m) / (Egypt) Dina Meshref (f)
- October 12–19: 2024 African Table Tennis Championships in (Ethiopia) Addis Ababa

Youth

- July 15–21: 2024 ITTF African Youth Championships in (Botswana) Gaborone

=== Americas ===
Senior

- January 19–21: 2024 Pan American Cup in (United States) Corpus Christi
  - Winners: (Canada) Edward Ly (m) / (Brazil) Bruna Takahashi (f)
- October 13–20: 2024 Pan American Table Tennis Championships in (El Salvador) San Salvador

Youth

- August 31– September 7: 2024 ITTF Pan American Youth Championships in (Peru) Lima

=== Asia ===
Senior

- October 6–13: 2024 Asian Table Tennis Championships in (Kazakhstan) Astana

Youth

- June 30– July 6: 2024 Asian Youth Championships in (China) Chongqing

=== Europe ===
Senior

- January 20–21: 2024 Europe Top 16 Cup in (Switzerland) Montreux
  - Winners: (Slovenia) Darko Jorgić (m) / (France) Jia Nan Yuan (f)
- May 31 – June 1: 2023-24 European Champions League Men Final 4 in (Germany) Saarbrücken
- October 15–20: 2024 European Table Tennis Championships in (Denmark) Linz

Youth

- January 24–28: 2024 European Under-21 Table Tennis Championships in (North Macedonia) Skopje
- July 12–21: 2024 European Youth Championships in (Sweden) Malmö

=== Oceania ===
Senior

- May 11–12: 2024 ITTF-Oceania Cup in (New Caledonia) Noumea
  - Winners: (Australia) Finn Luu (m) / (Australia) Yangzi Liu (f)
- October 15–18: 2024 Oceania Table Tennis Championships in (New Zealand) Auckland

Youth

- September 7–8: 2024 ITTF-Oceania Youth Championships in (Australia) Melbourne

== 2024 WTT Series ==
WTT Grand Smash

- March 7–17: Singapore Smash in Singapore
  - Singles winners: (China) Wang Chuqin (m) / (China) Wang Manyu (f)
  - Doubles winners: (China) Lin Gaoyuan & Ma Long (m) / (China) Chen Meng & Wang Manyu (f)
  - Mixed Doubles winners: (China) Wang Chuqin & Sun Yingsha
- May 1–11: Saudi Smash in (Saudi Arabia) Jeddah
  - Singles winners: (China) Wang Chuqin (m) / (China) Chen Meng (f)
  - Doubles winners: (China) Wang Chuqin & Ma Long (m) / (China) Chen Meng & Wang Manyu (f)
  - Mixed Doubles winners: (China) Wang Chuqin & Sun Yingsha
- September 26– October 6: China Smash in Beijing
  - Singles winners: (China) Lin Shidong (m) / (China) Sun Yingsha (f)
  - Doubles winners: (China) Liang Jingkun & Wang Chuqin (m) / (China) Chen Xingtong & Qian Tianyi (f)
  - Mixed Doubles winners: (China) Lin Shidong & Kuai Man

WTT Champions

- March 27–31: WTT Champions in (South Korea) Incheon
  - Singles winners: (China) Liang Jingkun (m) / (China) Sun Yingsha (f)
- May 30– June 3: WTT Champions in (China) Chongqing
  - Singles winners: (China) Fan Zhendong (m) / (China) Sun Yingsha (f)
- September 9–15: WTT Champions in (Macau) Macao
  - Singles winners: (China) Lin Shidong (m) / (China) Sun Yingsha (f)
- October 22–27: WTT Champions in (France) Montpellier
  - Singles winners: (France) Felix Lebrun (m) / (Japan) Satsuki Odo (f)
- November 3–10: WTT Champions in (Germany) Frankfurt
  - Singles winners: (China) Lin Shidong (m) / (China) Wang Manyu (f)

WTT Star Contender

- January 8–13: WTT Star Contender in (Qatar) Doha
  - Singles winners: (China) Wang Chuqin (m) / (China) Sun Yingsha (f)
  - Doubles winners: (China) Yuan Licen & Liang Jingkun (m) / (China) Qian Tianyi & Chen Xingtong (f)
  - Mixed Doubles winners: (China) Sun Yingsha & Wang Chuqin
- January 23–28: WTT Star Contender in (India) Goa
  - Singles winners: (France) Félix Lebrun (m) / (Chinese Taipei) Cheng I-ching (f)
  - Doubles winners: (South Korea) An Jae-hyun & Lim Jong-hoon (m) / (South Korea) Shin Yu-bin & Jeon Ji-hee (f)
  - Mixed Doubles winners: (South Korea) Lim Jong-hoon & Shin Yu-bin
- June 10–16: WTT Star Contender in (Slovenia) Ljubljana
  - Singles winners: (Brazil) Hugo Calderano (m) / (Japan) Hina Hayata (f)
  - Doubles winners: (Sweden) Anton Källberg & Kristian Karlsson (m) / (Japan) Miyuu Kihara & Miyu Nagasaki (f)
  - Mixed Doubles winners: (Japan) Tomokazu Harimoto & Hina Hayata
- July 2–7: WTT Star Contender in (Thailand) Bangkok
  - Singles winners: (Japan) Tomokazu Harimoto (m) / (Japan) Mima Ito (f)
  - Doubles winners: (Japan) Tomokazu Harimoto & Sora Matsushima (m) / (Japan) Honoka Hashimoto & Hitomi Sato (f)
  - Mixed Doubles winners: (Japan) Tomokazu Harimoto & Hina Hayata

WTT Contender

- January 14–20: WTT Contender in (Qatar) Doha
  - Singles winners: (Germany) Timo Boll (m) / (South Korea) Jeon Ji-hee (f)
  - Doubles winners: (South Korea) Lee Sang-su & Lim Jong-hoon (m) / (South Korea) Shin Yu-bin & Jeon Ji-hee (f)
  - Mixed Doubles winners: (China) Sun Yingsha & Wang Chuqin
- May 21–26: WTT Contender in (China) Taiyuan
  - Singles winners: (China) Liang Jingkun (m) / (China) Chen Xingtong (f)
  - Doubles winners: (China) Lin Gaoyuan & Ma Long (m) / (China) Kuai Man & Chen Yi (f)
  - Mixed Doubles winners: (China) Lin Shidong & Kuai Man
- May 20–26: WTT Contender in (Brazil) Rio de Janeiro
  - Singles winners: (Brazil) Hugo Calderano (m) / (Japan) Miyu Nagasaki (f)
  - Doubles winners: (South Korea) An Jae-hyun & Oh Jun-sung (m) / (Japan) Honoka Hashimoto & Hitomi Sato (f)
  - Mixed Doubles winners: (South Korea) Shin Yu-bin & Lim Jong-hoon
- May 20–26: WTT Contender in (Argentina) Mendoza
  - Singles winners: (Germany) Benedikt Duda (m) / (Japan) Sakura Mori (f)
  - Doubles winners: (Argentina) Horacio Cifuentes & Santiago Lorenzo (m) / (Japan) Sakura Mori & Miyu Nagasaki (f)
  - Mixed Doubles winners: (Japan) Yuta Tanaka & Miyu Nagasaki
- June 3–9: WTT Contender in (Croatia) Zagreb
  - Singles winners: (France) Alexis Lebrun (m) / (Japan) Hina Hayata (f)
  - Doubles winners: (France) Alexis Lebrun & Simon Gauzy (m) / (Japan) Sakura Yokoi & Satsuki Odo (f)
  - Mixed Doubles winners: (Japan) Tomokazu Harimoto & Hina Hayata
- June 19–23: WTT Contender in (Nigeria) Lagos
  - Singles winners: (Germany) Dimitrij Ovtcharov (m) / (India) Sreeja Akula (f)
  - Doubles winners: (India) Harmeet Desai & Manav Thakkar (m) / (India) Sreeja Akula & Archana Kamath (f)
  - Mixed Doubles winners: (South Korea) Lim Jong-hoon & Shin Yu-bin
- June 24–30: WTT Contender in (Tunisia) Tunis
  - Singles winners: (Japan) Tomokazu Harimoto (m) / (Japan) Miwa Harimoto (f)
  - Doubles winners: (Japan) Tomokazu Harimoto & Sora Matsushima (m) / (Japan) Sakura Yokoi & Satsuki Odo (f)
  - Mixed Doubles winners: (Japan) Tomokazu Harimoto & Hina Hayata
- August 19–25: WTT Contender in (Peru) Lima
  - Singles winners: (Slovenia) Darko Jorgić (m) / (Japan) Satsuki Odo (f)
  - Doubles winners: (France) Florian Bourras & Esteban Dorr (m) / (Japan) Sakura Yokoi & Satsuki Odo (f)
  - Mixed Doubles winners: (Brazil) Henrique Noguti & Giulia Takahashi
- September 3–8: WTT Contender in (Kazakhstan) Almaty
  - Singles winners: (China) Lin Shidong (m) / (China) Shi Xunyao (f)
  - Doubles winners: (China) Lin Shidong & Xu Yingbin (m) / (China) He Zhuojia & Liu Weishan (f)
  - Mixed Doubles winners: (China) Lin Shidong & Kuai Man
- October 28–November 2: WTT Contender in (Oman) Muscat
  - Singles winners: (China) Lin Shidong (m) / (China) Kuai Man (f)
  - Doubles winners: (China) Xiang Peng & Yuan Licen (m) / (China) Yang Yiyun & Zhu Sibing (f)
  - Mixed Doubles winners: (China) Lin Shidong & Kuai Man

WTT Finals

- November 20–24: WTT Finals in (Japan) Fukuoka
  - Singles winners: (China) Wang Chuqin (m) / (China) Wang Manyu (f)
  - Doubles winners: (France) Alexis Lebrun & Felix Lebrun (m) / (Japan) Honoka Hashimoto & Hitomi Sato (f)

== 2024 WTT Feeder ==
- January 15–18: WTT Feeder Corpus Christi in (United States) Corpus Christi
  - Singles winners: (Kazakhstan) Kirill Gerassimenko (m) / (India) Sreeja Akula (f)
  - Doubles winners: (Chile) Gustavo Gomez & Nicolas Burgos (m) / (United States) Deng Zhen & Lin Jiaqi (f)
  - Mixed Doubles winners: (Italy) Niagol Stoyanov & Giorgia Piccolin
- February 1–4: WTT Feeder Manchester in (England) Manchester
  - Singles winners: (South Korea) Cho Dae-seong (m) / (United States) Lily Zhang (f)
  - Doubles winners: (Belgium) Martin Allegro & Florent Lambiet (m) / (Slovakia) Barbora Balážová & (Czech Republic) Hana Matelová (f)
  - Mixed Doubles winners: (Hungary) Nandor Ecseki & Dora Madarasz
- March 17–20: WTT Feeder Beirut in (Lebanon) Beirut
  - Singles winners: (India) Sathiyan Gnanasekaran (m) / (Luxembourg) Ni Xialian (f)
  - Doubles winners: (Cuba) Jorge Campos & Andy Pereira (m) / (Hong Kong) Zhu Chengzhu & Doo Hoi Kem (f)
  - Mixed Doubles winners: (India) Manush Utpalbhai Shah & Diya Parag Chitale
- March 21–24: WTT Feeder Beirut II in (Lebanon) Beirut
  - Singles winners: (Chinese Taipei) Chuang Chih-yuan (m) / (India) Sreeja Akula (f)
  - Doubles winners: (India) Manav Thakkar & Manush Utpalbhai Shah (m) / (Hong Kong) Zhu Chengzhu & Doo Hoi Kem (f)
  - Mixed Doubles winners: (India) Poymantee Baisya & Akash Pal
- March 26 – April 1: WTT Feeder Otočec in (Slovenia) Otočec
  - Singles winners: (South Korea) Cho Dae-seong (m) / (South Korea) Park Gahyeon (f)
  - Doubles winners: (South Korea) Kim Minhyeok & Park Gang-hyeon (m) / (South Korea) Kim Hayeong & Lee Eun-hye (f)
  - Mixed Doubles winners: (Spain) Maria Xiao & Álvaro Robles
- April 2–7: WTT Feeder Varaždin in (Croatia) Varaždin
  - Singles winners: (Hong Kong) Wong Chun Ting (m) / (Japan) Satsuki Odo (f)
  - Doubles winners: (France) Florian Bourrassaud & Esteban Dorr (m) / (Japan) Sakura Yokoi & Satsuki Odo (f)
  - Mixed Doubles winners: (Sweden) Kristian Karlsson & Christina Källberg
- April 8–12: WTT Feeder Düsseldorf in (Germany) Düsseldorf
  - Singles winners: (United States) Kanak Jha (m) / (Japan) Satsuki Odo (f)
  - Doubles winners: (Poland) Jakub Dyjas & (Belgium) Cedric Nuytinck (m) / (Hong Kong) Zhu Chengzhu & Lee Ho Ching (f)
  - Mixed Doubles winners: (Singapore) Quek Izaac & Zhou Jingyi
- April 14–17: WTT Feeder Havířov in (Czech Republic) Havířov
  - Singles winners: (Japan) Maharu Yoshimura (m) / (South Korea) Lee Eun-hye (f)
  - Doubles winners: (South Korea) Oh Jun-sung & Park Gyu-hyeon (m) / (South Korea) Choi Hyo-joo & Lee Dae-un (f)
  - Mixed Doubles winners: (South Korea) Park Gyu-hyeon & Yoon Hyo-bin
- May 13–17: WTT Feeder Cappadocia in (Turkey) Cappadocia
  - Singles winners: (Japan) Yuta Tanaka (m) / (Japan) Satsuki Odo (f)
  - Doubles winners: (Chinese Taipei) Huang Yan-cheng & Feng Yi-hsin (m) / (Japan) Honoka Hashimoto & Hitomi Sato (f)
  - Mixed Doubles winners: (India) Akash Pal & Poymantee Baisya
- August 20–25: WTT Feeder Olomouc in (Czech Republic) Olomouc
  - Singles winners: (China) Xiang Peng (m) / (Japan) Honoka Hashimoto (f)
  - Doubles winners: (China) Xiang Peng & Yuan Licen (m) / (Japan) Honoka Hashimoto & Hitomi Sato (f)
  - Mixed Doubles winners: (Slovakia) Ľubomír Pištej & Tatiana Kukulkova
- August 29– September 1: WTT Feeder Muscat in (Oman) Muscat
  - Singles winners: (China) Xue Fei (m) / (Japan) Sakura Yokoi (f)
  - Doubles winners: (France) Joe Seyfried & Bastien Rembert (m) / (China) Xu Yi & Fan Shuhan (f)
  - Mixed Doubles winners: (China) Xue Fei & Wang Xiaotong
- September 11–15: WTT Feeder Panagyurishte in (Bulgaria) Panagyurishte
  - Singles winners: (Denmark) Anders Lind (m) / (Japan) Satsuki Odo (f)
  - Doubles winners: (China) Sun Wen & Xu Haidong (m) / (Japan) Honoka Hashimoto & Hitomi Sato (f)
  - Mixed Doubles winners: (China) Xue Fei & Han Feier
- September 16–21: WTT Feeder Halmstad in (Sweden) Halmstad
  - Singles winners: (China) Xue Fei (m) / (China) Wang Xiaotong (f)
  - Doubles winners: (China) Xu Haidong & Sun Wen (m) / (China) Wang Xiaotong & Han Feier (f)
  - Mixed Doubles winners: (China) Huang Youzheng & Zong Geman
- October 2–6: WTT Feeder Doha in (Qatar) Doha
  - Singles winners: (Chinese Taipei) Chang Yu-an (m) / (Japan) Hitomi Sato (f)
  - Doubles winners: (China) Chen Junsong & Sun Yang (m) / (Japan) Anne Uesawa & Yuna Ojio (f)
  - Mixed Doubles winners: (China) Chen Junsong & Wang Xiaonan
- October 22–27: WTT Feeder Cagliari in (Italy) Cagliari
  - Singles winners: (Japan) Yuto Muramatsu (m) / (Macau) Zhu Yuling (f)
  - Doubles winners: (Belgium) Martin Allegro & Adrien Rassenfosse (m) / (India) Yashaswini Ghorpade & Krittwika Roy (f)
  - Mixed Doubles winners: (Italy) John Oyebode & Gaia Monfardini
- October 30– November 1: WTT Feeder Prishtina in (Kosovo) Pristina
  - Singles winners: (Croatia) Tomislav Pucar (m) / (Japan) Sakura Yokoi (f)
  - Doubles winners: (South Korea) Gil Min-seok & Kwak Yu-bin (m) / (Japan) Sakura Yokoi & Sachi Aoki (f)
  - Mixed Doubles winners: (Croatia) Ivor Ban & Hana Arapovic
- October 31– November 3: WTT Feeder Caracas in (Venezuela) Caracas
  - Singles winners: (India) Harmeet Desai (m) / (China) Xu Jiayi (f)
  - Doubles winners: (Cuba) Andy Pereira & Jorge Campos (m) / (China) Zhu Ziyu & Xu Jiayi (f)
  - Mixed Doubles winners: (India) Harmeet Desai & Krittwika Roy
- November 18–22: WTT Feeder Düsseldorf II in (Germany) Düsseldorf
  - Singles winners: (China) Chen Yuanyu (m) / (China) Chen Yi (f)
  - Doubles winners: (Japan) Kazuki Hamada & Jo Yokotani (m) / (China) Kuai Man & Chen Yi (f)
  - Mixed Doubles winners: (China) Xue Fei & Kuai Man
- November 23–27: WTT Feeder Vila Nova de Gaia in (Portugal) Vila Nova de Gaia
  - Singles winners: (China) Zhou Qihao (m) / (Japan) Kyoka Idesawa (f)
  - Doubles winners: (China) Zhou Qihao & Xue Fei (m) / (China) Chen Yi & Han Feier (f)
  - Mixed Doubles winners: (China) Xue Fei & Han Feier

== 2024 WTT Youth Contender ==
WTT Youth Star Contender

- January 31 – February 4: WTT Youth Star Contender Tunis in (Tunisia) Tunis
  - U19 singles winners: (South Korea) Oh Jun-sung (b) / (Germany) Annett Kaufmann (g)
  - U15 singles winners: (South Korea) Lee Seung-soo (b) / (France) Nina Guo Zheng (g)
- March 14–17: WTT Youth Star Contender Singapore in Singapore
  - U19 singles winners: (China) Huang Youzheng (b) / (China) Qin Yuxuan (g)
  - U15 singles winners: (Japan) Ryuusei Kawakami (b) / (Hong Kong) Su Tsz Tung (g)
- April 10–14 : WTT Youth Contender Podgorica in (Montenegro) Podgorica
  - U19 singles winners: (China) Sun Yang (b) / (South Korea) Park Ga-hyeon (g)
  - U15 singles winners: (Japan) Ryuusei Kawakami (b) / (China) Zhao Wangqi (g)
- June 19–23 : WTT Youth Star Contender Lima in (Peru) Lima
- September 4–8 : WTT Youth Star Contender Skopje in (North Macedonia) Skopje
- October 8–12 : WTT Youth Star Contender Doha in (Qatar) Doha

WTT Youth Contender

- January 11–14: WTT Youth Contender Linz in (Austria) Linz
  - U19 singles winners: (Germany) Andre Bertelsmeier (b) / (Japan) Hana Yoshimoto (g)
  - U17 singles winners: (Ukraine) Mykhailo Lovkha (b) / (Japan) Hana Yoshimoto (g)
  - U15 singles winners: (Italy) Danilo Faso (b) / (Japan) Sakurako Kagawa (g)
  - U13 singles winners: (Japan) Sora Okada (b) / (Japan) Umi Nakada (g)
  - U11 singles winners: (Italy) Pietro Campagna (b)
- January 16–19: WTT Youth Contender Antalya in (Turkey) Antalya
  - U19 singles winners: (Bulgaria) Yoan Velichkov (b) / (Egypt) Hana Goda (g)
  - U17 singles winners: (Iran) Benyamin Faraji (b) / (Egypt) Hana Goda (g)
  - U15 singles winners: (Iran) Faraz Shakiba (b) / (Singapore) Loy Ming Ying (g)
  - U13 singles winners: (Japan) Sora Okada (b) / (Turkey) Ela Yonter (g)
  - U11 singles winners: (England) Dimitar Dimitrov (b) / (Turkey) Zeynep Duran (g)
- January 22–25: WTT Youth Contender Doha in (Qatar) Doha
  - U19 singles winners: (Iran) Amirmahdi Keshavarzi (b) / (Kazakhstan) Zhanerke Koshkumbayeva (g)
  - U17 singles winners: (Tunisia) Wassim Essid (b) / (India) Pratha Pawar (g)
  - U15 singles winners: (Germany) Alexander Uhing (b) / (Egypt) Hend Zaza (g)
  - U13 singles winners: (Uganda) Joseph Sebatindira (b) / (India) Khwaish Lotia (g)
  - U11 singles winners: (Uganda) Joseph Sebatindira (b) / (Bahrain) Kenda Mahmoud (g)
- February 10–16: WTT Youth Contender Vila Real in (Portugal) Vila Real
  - U19 singles winners: (France) Celian Besnier (b) / (France) Agathe Avezou (g)
  - U17 singles winners: (France) Flavio Mourier (b) / (France) Elise Pujol (g)
  - U15 singles winners: (Puerto Rico) Steven Moreno (b) / (Czech Republic) Hanka Kodetová (g)
  - U13 singles winners: (France) Nolan Johnston (b) / (Spain) Eloisa Barreda (g)
  - U11 singles winners: (England) Dimitar Dimitrov (b) / (Spain) Carmen Gomez (g)
- February 23–26: WTT Youth Contender Tunis in (Tunisia) Tunis
  - U19 singles winners: (India) Ankur Bhattacharjee (b) / (Singapore) Tan Zhao Yun (g)
  - U17 singles winners: (France) Antoine Noirault (b) / (South Korea) Yoo Ye-rin (g)
  - U15 singles winners: (South Korea) Ma Yeong-min (b) / (Hong Kong) Su Tsz Tung (g)
  - U13 singles winners: (Saudi Arabia) Abdulrahman Al Taher (b) / (Uzbekistan) Adelina Khasanova (g)
  - U11 singles winners: (Uzbekistan) Khusen Iskandarov (b) / (Tunisia) Ritej Chebbi (g)
- February 28 – March 2: WTT Youth Contender Algiers in (Algeria) Algiers
  - U19 singles winners: (South Korea) Kim Ga-on (b) / (South Korea) Yoo Ye-rin (g)
  - U17 singles winners: (India) Abhinandh Pradhivadhi (b) / (India) Divyanshi Bhowmick (g)
  - U15 singles winners: (India) Sarthak Arya (b) / (India) Syndrela Das (g)
  - U13 singles winners: (Azerbaijan) Onur Guluzade (b) / (Uzbekistan) Adelina Khasanova (g)
  - U11 singles winners: (Uzbekistan) Amir Shiriev (b) / (Algeria) Ritej Brahim (g)
- March 7–10: WTT Youth Contender Panagyurishte in (Bulgaria) Panagyurishte
  - U19 singles winners: (France) Flavien Coton (b) / (South Korea) Choi Na-hyun (g)
  - U17 singles winners: (South Korea) Kwon Hyuk (b) / (Poland) Natalia Bogdanowicz (g)
  - U15 singles winners: (South Korea) Lee Seung-soo (b) / (India) Hansini Mathan (g)
  - U13 singles winners: (Turkey) Kuzey Gundogdu (b) / (Chinese Taipei) Li Jen-Yueh (g)
  - U11 singles winners: (Kazakhstan) Abay Zhumagul (b) / (Turkey) Zeynep Duran (g)
- March 26–29: WTT Youth Contender Beirut in (Lebanon) Beirut
  - U19 singles winners: (Kazakhstan) Alan Kurmangaliyev (b) / (India) Sayali Wani (g)
  - U17 singles winners: (Kazakhstan) Alan Kurmangaliyev (b) / (Uzbekistan) Arujan Kamalova (g)
  - U15 singles winners: (Uzbekistan) Khurshid Akhmedov (b) / (Uzbekistan) Arujan Kamalova (g)
  - U13 singles winners: (Uzbekistan) Rahmatillo Abdurashidov (b) / (Uzbekistan) Adelina Khasanova (g)
  - U11 singles winners: (Uzbekistan) Amir Shiriev (b) / (Uzbekistan) Makhliyo Masharipova (g)
- April 17–20 : WTT Youth Contender Luxembourg in Luxembourg
  - U19 singles winners: (China) Sun Yang (b) / (China) Yao Ruixuan (g)
  - U17 singles winners: (China) Sun Yang (b) / (China) Yang Huize (g)
  - U15 singles winners: (South Korea) Lee Seung-soo (b) / (India) Divyanshi Bhowmick (g)
  - U13 singles winners: (Bulgaria) Miroslav Schmidt (b) / (Sweden) Siri Benjegard (g)
  - U11 singles winners: (Ukraine) David Drobov (b) / (Netherlands) Zoe Schutte (g)
- April 17–20 : WTT Youth Contender Santiago in (Chile) Santiago
  - U19 singles winners: (Brazil) Felipe Doti (b) / (Poland) Zuzanna Wielgos (g)
  - U17 singles winners: (Brazil) Lucas Romanski (b) / (Poland) Katarzyna Rajkowska (g)
  - U15 singles winners: (Brazil) Vitor Thiofilo (b) / (Brazil) Mahayla Sarda (g)
  - U13 singles winners: (Brazil) Vitor Thiofilo (b) / (Ecuador) Maria Abril (g)
  - U11 singles winners: (Chile) Nicholas Leyton (b) / (Brazil) Yumi Iwamoto (g)
- April 22–28 : WTT Youth Contender Spa in (Belgium) Spa
  - U19 singles winners: (Portugal) Tiago Abiodun (b) / (France) Leana Hochart (g)
  - U17 singles winners: (France) Nathan Lam (b) / (South Korea) Heo Ye-rim (g)
  - U15 singles winners: (South Korea) Ma Yeong-min (b) / (South Korea) Lee Da-hye (g)
  - U13 singles winners: (France) Nolan Johnston (b) / (France) Lisa Zhao (g)
  - U11 singles winners: (England) Dimitr Dimitrov (b) / (Germany) Dana Haspel (g)
- April 22–28 : WTT Youth Contender Metz in (France) Metz
  - U19 singles winners: (South Korea) Kim Ga-on (b) / (France) Nina Guo Zheng (g)
  - U17 singles winners: (France) Nathan Lam (b) / (France) Leana Hochart (g)
  - U15 singles winners: (South Korea) Park Min-hyeok (b) / (South Korea) Lee Da-hye (g)
  - U13 singles winners: (Azerbaijan) Onur Guluzade (b) / (France) Eva Lam (g)
  - U11 singles winners: (Austria) Louis Fegerl (b) / (Ukraine) Diana Didukh (g)
- April 29 – May 5 : WTT Youth Contender Puerto Princesa in (Philippines) Puerto Princesa
  - U19 singles winners: (Chinese Taipei) Chang Yu-an (b) / (Chinese Taipei) Cheng Pusyuan (g)
  - U17 singles winners: (Chinese Taipei) Hung Jing-kai (b) / (Chinese Taipei) Peng Yu-han (g)
  - U15 singles winners: (Chinese Taipei) Cheng Min-hsiu (b) / (Chinese Taipei) Wu Ying-syuan (g)
  - U13 singles winners: (Malaysia) Lai Yong Ren (b) / (Hong Kong) Lee Tsz Wai (g)
  - U11 singles winners: (Malaysia) Lian Yu Zheng (b) / (Malaysia) Yong Wan Suan (g)
- May 8–11 : WTT Youth Contender Gangneung in (South Korea) Gangneung
  - U19 singles winners: (Chinese Taipei) Chang Yu-an (b) / (Japan) Rin Mende (g)
  - U17 singles winners: (Japan) Ryuusei Kawakami (b) / (Japan) Yuna Ojio (g)
  - U15 singles winners: (South Korea) Lee Seung-soo (b) / (Japan) Yui Sakuma (g)
  - U13 singles winners: (Chinese Taipei) Chen Kai-cheng (b) / (Japan) Miku Matsushima (g)
  - U11 singles winners: (South Korea) Park Chan-yong (b) / (Japan) Kaede Neya (g)
- May 13–19 : WTT Youth Contender Platja D'Aro in (Spain) Platja d'Aro
  - U19 singles winners: (Portugal) Tiago Abiodun (b) / (Romania) Bianca Mei-Rosu (g)
  - U17 singles winners: (Portugal) Tiago Abiodun (b) / (Romania) Bianca Mei-Rosu (g)
  - U15 singles winners: (Sweden) Adam Wallin (b) / (Germany) Lisa Wang (g)
  - U13 singles winners: (Spain) Ladimir Mayorov (b) / (Spain) Eloisa Barreda (g)
  - U11 singles winners: (France) Deyvan Lemaire (b) / (Spain) Carmen Gomez (g)
- May 19–22 : WTT Youth Contender San Francisco in (United States) San Francisco
  - U19 singles winners: (United States) Nandan Naresh (b) / (Chinese Taipei) Cheng Pusyuan (g)
  - U17 singles winners: (United States) Darryl Tsao (b) / (United States) Sally Moyland (g)
  - U15 singles winners: (United States) Ryan Lin (b) / (Chinese Taipei) Chen Chi-yun (g)
  - U13 singles winners: (United States) Chirag Pradhan (b) / (Chinese Taipei) Li Jen-yueh (g)
  - U11 singles winners: (United States) Chirag Pradhan (b) / (Canada) Cindy Zhu (g)
- May 22–25 : WTT Youth Contender Wladyslawowo in (Poland) Wladyslawowo
  - U19 singles winners: (Chinese Taipei) Hsu Hsien-chia (b) / (Chinese Taipei) Yeh Yi-tian (g)
  - U17 singles winners: (Poland) Marcel Blaszczyk (b) / (France) Leana Hochart (g)
  - U15 singles winners: (Chinese Taipei) Hung Che-yen (b) / (Chinese Taipei) Chen Min-hsin (g)
  - U13 singles winners: (Poland) Olaf Glanert (b) / (Poland) Aleksandra Nawrocka (g)
  - U11 singles winners: (Uganda) Joseph Sebatindira (b) / (Poland) Julia Szarmach (g)
- May 27 – June 2 : WTT Youth Contender Berlin in (Germany) Berlin
  - U19 singles winners: (Japan) Yuhi Sakai (b) / (China) Zhao Wangqi (g)
  - U17 singles winners: (Japan) Kazuki Yoshiyama (b) / (South Korea) Yoo Ye-rin (g)
  - U15 singles winners: (China) Wang Zining (b) / (Czech Republic) Hanka Kodetova (g)
  - U13 singles winners: (Luxembourg) Philip Theisen (b) / (Japan) Miku Matsushima (g)
  - U11 singles winners: (Poland) Wojciech Flaumenhaft (b) / (Germany) Hannah Sculauch (g)
- May 27 – June 2 : WTT Youth Contender Havirov in (Czech Republic) Havirov
  - U19 singles winners: (Germany) Andre Bertelsmeier (b) / (China) Yao Ruixuan (g)
  - U17 singles winners: (Japan) Kazuki Yoshiyama (b) / (Chinese Taipei) Yeh Yi-Tian (g)
  - U15 singles winners: (China) Huan Lei (b) / (Japan) Miku Matsushima (g)
  - U13 singles winners: (Czech Republic) Ondrej Moravek (b) / (Japan) Hisa Uriu (g)
  - U11 singles winners: (Austria) Louis Fegerl (b) / (Czech Republic) Barbora Cupakova (g)
- June 5–8 : WTT Youth Contender Helsingborg in (Sweden) Helsingborg
- June 10–13 : WTT Youth Contender Sandefjord in (Norway) Sandefjord
- June 25–28 : WTT Youth Contender Westchester in (United States) Westchester
- July 1–4 : WTT Youth Contender Benghazi in (Libya) Benghazi
- July 8–14 : WTT Youth Contender Hong Kong in Hong Kong
- July 17–20 : WTT Youth Contender Sulaymaniyah in (Iraq) Sulaymaniyah
- July 22–25 : WTT Youth Contender Amman in (Jordan) Amman
- July 22–25 : WTT Youth Contender San Francisco II in (United States) San Francisco
- July 27–30 : WTT Youth Contender Almaty in (Kazakhstan) Almaty
- August 27 – September 2 : WTT Youth Contender Varazdin in (Croatia) Varaždin
- August 27 – September 2 : WTT Youth Contender Otocec in (Slovenia) Otocec
- September 9–15 : WTT Youth Contender Bangkok in (Thailand) Bangkok
- September 10–13 : WTT Youth Contender Podgorica in (Montenegro) Podgorica
- September 15–18 : WTT Youth Contender Sarajevo in (Bosnia and Herzegovina) Sarajevo
- September 18–21 : WTT Youth Contender Vientiane in (Laos) Vientiane
- September 23–26 : WTT Youth Contender Dammam in (Saudi Arabia) Dammam
- September 26–29 : WTT Youth Contender Batumi in (Georgia (country)) Batumi
- October 3–6 : WTT Youth Contender Darwin in (Australia) Darwin
- October 14–17 : WTT Youth Contender Dubai in (United Arab Emirates) Dubai
- October 22–25 : WTT Youth Contender Cuenca in (Ecuador) Cuenca
- October 24–27 : WTT Youth Contender Prishtina in (Kosovo) Prishtina
- October 26 – November 1 : WTT Youth Contender Ismailia in (Egypt) Ismailia
- October 27–30 : WTT Youth Contender Rionegro in (Colombia) Rionegro
- October 30 – November 5 : WTT Youth Contender Senec in (Slovakia) Senec
- November 3–9 : WTT Youth Contender Szombathely in (Hungary) Szombathely
- November 4–7 : WTT Youth Contender Caracas in (Venezuela) Caracas
- November 7–13 : WTT Youth Contender Lignano in (Italy) Lignano
- November 9–12 : WTT Youth Contender Asunción in (Paraguay) Asunción
- November 14–17 : WTT Youth Contender Buenos Aires in (Argentina) Buenos Aires

== See also ==
- International Table Tennis Federation
- 2024 in sports
