= 2026 Asian Table Tennis Championships – Women's doubles =

Women's doubles at the 2026 Asian Table Tennis Championships
- Venue: Olimpiya shaharchasi
- Date: 19–25 October 2026
- Competitors: 40 pairs from 22 nations

The Women's doubles at the 2026 Asian Table Tennis Championships will be held in Tashkent, Uzbekistan from 19 to 25 October 2026.

Wang Yidi and Kuai Man won their first Women's doubles gold medal in Asian Championship. They will be qualified to 2027 World Table Tennis Championships and 2027 Doubles World Cup.

== Format and Qualification ==
The tournament is played in a straight single-elimination knockout format (best-of-five games).

=== 2027 World Championships and World Cup Qualification ===
This event serves as the official Asian qualification tournament for the 2027 World Table Tennis Championships. Asia has been allocated a total of 15 continental quotas for the Women's doubles event. The qualification spots are determined as follows:

- The 8 winners of the Round of 16 automatically qualify. (Note: Qualified means they will guarantee getting a spot in 2027 World Championships or Doubles World Cup, but final decision is based on each association. For instance, China and Japan might have different qualification selection based on World Ranking or national qualification matches. Even these players reach beyond Round of 16, their participation might be revoked.)
- The 8 losers of the Round of 16 will play one round of knockout matches; the 4 winners of these matches qualify.
- The 4 losers of the previous qualification round will play a progressive knockout to determine positions 13 to 16. The pairs finishing in 13th and 14th place will qualify.
- The pairs finishing in 15th place will get the final continental spot, and 16th place will be designated as reserves.

Additionally, the winners (gold medalists) of the Women's doubles event will automatically qualify for the 2027 Doubles World Cup.

== Seeds ==
- Seeding was determined by combining the individual doubles rankings; the lower the combined ranking, the higher the seeding.
1. (Japan) Miwa Harimoto / Hina Hayata
2. (China) Kuai Man / Wang Yidi
3. (Japan) Satsuki Odo / Miyu Nagasaki
4. (Hong Kong) Doo Hoi Kem / Ng Wing Lam
5. (China) Chen Yi / Jiang Yiyi
6. (India) Yashaswini Ghorpade / Swastika Ghosh
7. (Thailand) Orawan Paranang / Suthasini Sawettabut
8. (Singapore) Loy Ming Ying / Ser Lin Qian
9. (South Korea) Lee Daeun / Park Gahyeon
10. (Chinese Taipei) Chen Szu-yu / Wu Ying-syuan
11. (Chinese Taipei) Chien Tung-chuan / Peng Yu-han
12. (Malaysia) Karen Lyne / Tee Ai Xin
13. (Hong Kong) Kong Tsz Lam / So Tsz Tung
14. (Singapore) Lai Chloe / Tan Zhao Yun
15. (South Korea) Lee Zion / Yoo Siwoo
16. (Philippines) Kheith Cruz / Angelou Joyce Laude

== Main Draw ==
=== Finals ===
Semifinals						Final
1	(Japan) Harimoto M. (Japan) Hayata H.	12	16	11	11
5	(China) Chen Y. (China) Jiang Y. (bronze)	10	18	8	9	1	(Japan) Harimoto M. (Japan) Hayata H. (silver)	11	8	9	8
3	(Japan) Odo S. (Japan) Nagasaki M. (bronze)	7	6	4		2	(China) Kuai M. (China) Wang Y. (gold)	9	11	11	11
2	(China) Kuai M. (China) Wang Y.	11	11	11

=== Top Half ===
==== Section 1 ====
Round of 64
(Iran) Shahsavari N. (Iran) Yariseraji F.	8	11	6	11	11
(Macau) Chong I. T. (Macau) Leong I. N.	11	5	11	2	0
(Uzbekistan) Kamalova A. (Uzbekistan) Gulimova M.	11	8	8	13	7
(Indonesia) Sudarnita K. (Indonesia) Maliqa A.	9	11	11	11	11

Round of 32
1	(Japan) Harimoto M. (Japan) Hayata H.	11	11	11
(Iran) Shahsavari N. (Iran) Yariseraji F.	5	1	3
(Tajikistan) Azizova N. (Tajikistan) Ismailova D.	2	8	5
14	(Singapore) Lai C. (Singapore) Tan Z. Y.	11	11	11
15	(South Korea) Lee Z. (South Korea) Yoo S.	11	11	11
(Thailand) Vijitviriyagul K. (Thailand) Wonglakhon P.	9	6	3
(Indonesia) Sudarnita K. (Indonesia) Maliqa A.	11	4	12	7	5
6	(India) Ghorpade Y. (India) Ghosh S.	9	11	10	11	11

Round of 16
1	(Japan) Harimoto M. (Japan) Hayata H.	11	11	11
14	(Singapore) Lai C. (Singapore) Tan Z. Y.	4	4	5
15	(South Korea) Lee Z. (South Korea) Yoo S.	9	8	9
6	(India) Ghorpade Y. (India) Ghosh S.	11	11	11

Quarterfinals
1	(Japan) Harimoto M. (Japan) Hayata H.	11	11	11
6	(India) Ghorpade Y. (India) Ghosh S.	5	5	3

==== Section 2 ====
Round of 64
(Sri Lanka) Bandara B. (Sri Lanka) Alagiyawadu T. K.	11	11	11
(Maldives) Nafiz A. (Maldives) Ibrahim M.	9	5	8
(Kuwait) Abdulraheem M. (Kuwait) Alshammari M.	11	4	5	1
(Philippines) Fadol R. J. (Philippines) Gudes A.	8	11	11	11

Round of 32
5	(China) Chen Y. (China) Jiang Y.	11	11	11
(Sri Lanka) Bandara B. (Sri Lanka) Alagiyawadu T. K.	5	8	7
(Kyrgyzstan) Abdimitalipova R. (Kyrgyzstan) Muratalieva R.	5	2	8
11	(Chinese Taipei) Chien T. C. (Chinese Taipei) Peng Y. H.	11	11	11
12	(Malaysia) Lyne K. (Malaysia) Tee A. X.	7	7	11	11	11
(Kazakhstan) Akasheva Z. (Kazakhstan) Mirkadirova S.	11	11	8	9	9
(Philippines) Fadol R. J. (Philippines) Gudes A.	6	4	6
4	(Hong Kong) Doo H. (Hong Kong) Ng W. L.	11	11	11

Round of 16
5	(China) Chen Y. (China) Jiang Y.	11	11	11
11	(Chinese Taipei) Chien T. C. (Chinese Taipei) Peng Y. H.	6	6	8
12	(Malaysia) Lyne K. (Malaysia) Tee A. X.	11	11	6	11
4	(Hong Kong) Doo H. (Hong Kong) Ng W. L.	8	6	11	5

Quarterfinals
5	(China) Chen Y. (China) Jiang Y.	11	5	11	11
12	(Malaysia) Lyne K. (Malaysia) Tee A. X.	4	11	4	3

=== Bottom Half ===
==== Section 3 ====
Round of 64
(Tajikistan) Samadova M. (Tajikistan) Sharipova P.	2	5	7
(Iran) Ashtari M. (Iran) Iloukhani S.	11	11	11
(Indonesia) Nebuchadnezzar A. (Indonesia) Aminah S.	11	11	11
(Mongolia) Tuvshinbayar E. (Mongolia) Ser-Od A.	6	6	3

Round of 32
3	(Japan) Odo S. (Japan) Nagasaki M.	11	11	11
(Iran) Ashtari M. (Iran) Iloukhani S.	5	8	4
(Jordan) El-Hasani R. (Jordan) Sadaqa Z.	4	2	10
13	(Hong Kong) Kong T. L. (Hong Kong) Su T. T.	11	11	12
10	(Chinese Taipei) Chen S. Y. (Chinese Taipei) Wu Y. S.	11	11	9	11
(Uzbekistan) Erkebaeva A. (Uzbekistan) Khasanova A.	5	5	11	2
(Indonesia) Nebuchadnezzar A. (Indonesia) Aminah S.	2	11	6	9
8	(Singapore) Loy M. Y. (Singapore) Ser L. Q.	11	9	11	11

Round of 16
3	(Japan) Odo S. (Japan) Nagasaki M.	11	11	7	11
13	(Hong Kong) Kong T. L. (Hong Kong) Su T. T.	7	4	11	7
10	(Chinese Taipei) Chen S. Y. (Chinese Taipei) Wu Y. S.	6	12	11	9
8	(Singapore) Loy M. Y. (Singapore) Ser L. Q.	11	14	4	11

Quarterfinals
3	(Japan) Odo S. (Japan) Nagasaki M.	16	11	11
8	(Singapore) Loy M. Y. (Singapore) Ser L. Q.	14	7	9

==== Section 4 ====
Round of 64
(Sri Lanka) Wadu M. (Sri Lanka) Halawathage S.	11	8	7	11	11
(Macau) Seak H. L. (Macau) Huang C. L.	7	11	11	9	9
(Kyrgyzstan) Aiazbekova N. (Kyrgyzstan) Kudusova S.	11	11	14
(Bangladesh) Mou S. (Bangladesh) Soma S.	4	4	12

Round of 32
7	(Thailand) Paranang O. (Thailand) Sawettabut S.	11	11	11
(Sri Lanka) Wadu M. (Sri Lanka) Halawathage S.	3	1	1
(Kazakhstan) Romanovskaya A. (Kazakhstan) Zhaxlykova A.	4	5	6
9	(South Korea) Lee D. (South Korea) Park G.	11	11	11
16	(Philippines) Cruz K. (Philippines) Laude A. J.	11	7	8	12	11
(Malaysia) Chang L. S. (Malaysia) Li Y. I.	4	11	11	10	6
(Kyrgyzstan) Aiazbekova N. (Kyrgyzstan) Kudusova S.	1	2	4
2	(China) Kuai M. (China) Wang Y.	11	11	11

Round of 16
7	(Thailand) Paranang O. (Thailand) Sawettabut S.	11	6	11	11	11
9	(South Korea) Lee D. (South Korea) Park G.	4	11	13	8	5
16	(Philippines) Cruz K. (Philippines) Laude A. J.	2	1	5
2	(China) Kuai M. (China) Wang Y.	11	11	11

Quarterfinals
7	(Thailand) Paranang O. (Thailand) Sawettabut S.	9	5	4
2	(China) Kuai M. (China) Wang Y.	11	11	11

== Qualification Playoff (Round of 16 Losers) ==
(Note: Two Women's Doubles Pairs from Chinese Taipei did not show up. They will be ranked 15 and 16 respectively)

- (Q): Qualified in 2027 ITTF World Championship through Asian continental method.

=== Match 1 ===
Position 9-16 (Loser will move forward to 13-16 position bracket)
14	(Singapore) Lai C. (Singapore) Tan Z. Y.	9	11	11	10	10
15	(South Korea) Lee Z. (South Korea) Yoo S. (Q)	11	7	9	12	12

=== Match 2 ===
Position 9-16 (Loser will move forward to 13-16 position bracket)
11	(Chinese Taipei) Chien T. C. (Chinese Taipei) Peng Y. H.
4	(Hong Kong) Doo H. (Hong Kong) Ng W. L. (Q)	w/o

=== Match 3 ===
Position 9-16 (Loser will move forward to 13-16 position bracket)
13	(Hong Kong) Kong T. L. (Hong Kong) Su T. T. (Q)	w/o
10	(Chinese Taipei) Chen S. Y. (Chinese Taipei) Wu Y. S.

=== Match 4 ===
Position 9-16 (Loser will move forward to 13-16 position bracket)
9	(South Korea) Lee D. (South Korea) Park G. (Q)	16	11	11
16	(Philippines) Cruz K. (Philippines) Laude J.	14	1	8

=== 13-16th position bracket ===
13-16th Semifinals (Loser in Qualification Play-off Match 1-4 will be randomly placed in this bracket)
14	(Singapore) Lai C. (Singapore) Tan Z. Y.	w/o
11	(Chinese Taipei) Chien T. C. (Chinese Taipei) Peng Y. H.
10	(Chinese Taipei) Chen S. Y. (Chinese Taipei) Wu Y. S.
16	(Philippines) Cruz K. (Philippines) Laude J.	w/o

13-14th Final
14	(Singapore) Lai C. (Singapore) Tan Z. Y. (Q)
16	(Philippines) Cruz K. (Philippines) Laude J. (Q)
15-16th Final
11	(Chinese Taipei) Chien T. C. (Chinese Taipei) Peng Y. H.	n/a
10	(Chinese Taipei) Chen S. Y. (Chinese Taipei) Wu Y. S.	n/a
