= 2026 Asian Table Tennis Championships – Men's singles =

Men's singles at the 2026 Asian Table Tennis Championships
- Venue: Olimpiya shaharchasi
- Date: 19–25 October 2026
- Competitors: 124 from 31 nations

The Men's singles at the 2026 Asian Table Tennis Championships will be held in Tashkent, Uzbekistan from 19 to 25 October 2026.

== Format and Qualification ==
The tournament is played in a straight single-elimination knockout format. All matches across all stages of the competition are played as a best-of-five (5) games.

Seedings for the draw are determined by ITTF World Ranking (Week 42).

=== 2027 World Championships Qualification ===
This event serves as the official Asian qualification tournament for the 2027 World Table Tennis Championships. Asia has been allocated a total of 27 continental quotas for Men's singles.

The quotas are distributed through a progressive knockout system based on performance in this tournament:

- All 16 winners of the Round of 32 automatically qualify. (Note: Qualified means they will guarantee getting a spot in 2027 World Championships, but final decision is based on each association. For instance, China and Japan might have different qualification selection based on World Ranking or national qualification matches. Even these players reach beyond Round of 32, their participation might be revoked.)
- The 16 losers of the Round of 32 play an additional single-elimination knockout round. The 8 winners of these matches qualify.
- The 8 losers of the classification matches enter a progressive knockout bracket to determine exact placements from 25th to 28th. The players finishing 25th, 26th, and 27th earn the final three automatic quotas. The player finishing 28th becomes the first reserve.

== Match Summary ==
=== Round of 64 ===
Top seed Sora Matsushima from Japan withdrew the Men's single competition due to fatigue and backpain.

=== Round of 32 ===
Korea Republic's Defender Kang Dongsoo upset Zhou Qihao in 3-0. According to playing system, Round of 32 losers will play in qualification matches to determine continental spot for 2027 ITTF World Championships. Zhou and Hung Jing-kai did not show up in the qualification matches.

=== Quarterfinals ===
Li Tianyang, Wen Ruibo, and Kuo Guan-hong are all making their debut at this event. They ensured they would capture their first medals after winning their quarterfinal matches. Defending champion Harimoto Tomokazu continued his winning streak by beating Feng Yi-hsin 3-2 after trailing 0-2.

=== Semifinals + Final ===
China's debutant Li Tianyang enters Asian Championship Final by beating Chinese Taipei Kuo Guan-Hong 3-2. He will be playing with defending champion Tomokazu Harimoto in the Final. Li was leading Harimoto 2-0 but Harimoto came back winning 3-2. Harimoto successfully defends the title in two consecutive editions.

== Seeds ==
- Seeding was determined by the International Table Tennis Federation world rankings released on October 12, 2026.

1. (Japan) Sora Matsushima
2. (Japan) Tomokazu Harimoto
3. (China) Zhou Qihao
4. (China) Wen Ruibo
5. (Japan) Shunsuke Togami
6. (Japan) Hiroto Shinozuka
7. (Chinese Taipei) Feng Yi-hsin
8. (China) Xiang Peng
9. (Chinese Taipei) Kuo Guan-hong
10. (Hong Kong) Wong Chun Ting
11. (South Korea) Park Ganghyeon
12. (India) Manav Thakkar
13. (Kazakhstan) Kirill Gerassimenko
14. (China) Huang Youzheng
15. (China) Li Tianyang
16. (Hong Kong) Chan Baldwin
17. (Japan) Yuta Tanaka
18. (South Korea) Park Gyuhyeon
19. (Singapore) Izaac Quek
20. (Hong Kong) Lam Siu Hang
21. (India) Harmeet Desai
22. (India) Payas Jain
23. (Chinese Taipei) Hung Jing-kai
24. (Singapore) Koen Pang
25. (Kazakhstan) Alan Kurmangaliyev
26. (Iran) Noshad Alamiyan
27. (Hong Kong) Yiu Kwan To
28. (South Korea) Kang Dongsoo
29. (Singapore) Chua Josh
30. (Chinese Taipei) Hsu Hsien-chia
31. (South Korea) Kim Minhyuk
32. (Iran) Benyamin Faraji

== Main Draw ==
=== Finals ===
Quarterfinals
15	(China) Li Tianyang	11	11	11
8	(China) Xiang Peng	6	8	7
9	(Chinese Taipei) Kuo Guan-hong	11	11	11
10	(Hong Kong) Wong Chun Ting	4	7	8
4	(China) Wen Ruibo	11	11	11
11	(South Korea) Park Ganghyeon	2	9	3
7	(Chinese Taipei) Feng Yi-hsin	13	11	2	5	5
2	(Japan) Tomokazu Harimoto	11	8	11	11	11

Semifinals
15	(China) Li Tianyang	11	11	7	11	11
9	(Chinese Taipei) Kuo Guan-hong (bronze)	13	7	11	2	6
4	(China) Wen Ruibo (bronze)	5	7	5
2	(Japan) Tomokazu Harimoto	11	11	11

Final
15	(China) Li Tianyang (silver)	11	11	7	8	7
2	(Japan) Tomokazu Harimoto (gold)	1	9	11	11	11

=== Top half ===
==== Section 1 ====
Round of 128
(Sri Lanka) Silva S.	14	14	12	6	11
(Uzbekistan) Iskandarov	12	16	10	11	2
(Mongolia) Buyan	11	12	11	11
(Kyrgyzstan) Ergeshov	13	10	5	8
(Kuwait) Albahrani	4	5	9
18	(South Korea) Park Gy.	11	11	11
27	(Hong Kong) Yiu K.	11	11	11
(Iran) Ni. Alamian	6	7	6
(Malaysia) Choong	11	12	8	8	12
(Iraq) Taher	6	10	11	11	10
(Philippines) Misal	5	11	10	11	11
(Bahrain) Saleh	11	5	12	6	4
(Saudi Arabia) Alkhadrawi	9	7	14	2
15	(China) Li T.	11	11	12	11

Round of 64
1	(Japan) Matsushima
(Sri Lanka) Silva S.	w/o
(Mongolia) Buyan	1	3	8
18	(South Korea) Park Gy.	11	11	11
27	(Hong Kong) Yiu K.	12	11	11
(Malaysia) Choong	10	5	9
(Philippines) Misal	7	5	2
15	(China) Li T.	11	11	11

Round of 32
(Sri Lanka) Silva S.	7	3	9
18	(South Korea) Park Gy.	11	11	11
27	(Hong Kong) Yiu K.	2	11	10	12	6
15	(China) Li T.	11	9	12	10	11

Round of 16
18	(South Korea) Park Gy.	9	12	5	11
15	(China) Li T.	11	10	11	13

==== Section 2 ====
Round of 128
12	(India) Thakkar	11	11	11
(Macau) Wang C.	3	9	5
(Indonesia) Junindra	11	11	11
(Philippines) Tormis	3	6	3
(Kazakhstan) Zhubanov	11	11	11
(Bangladesh) Ridoy	8	3	2
(Oman) Al Ghassani	5	11	5	2
24	(Singapore) Pang K.	11	9	11	11
23	(Chinese Taipei) Hung J.K.	11	11	11
(Thailand) Preechayan	6	5	4
(Tajikistan) Fuzaili	11	11	9	10	6
(Turkmenistan) Allanazarov	7	9	11	12	11
(Yemen) Gubran	6	5	14	6
(Uzbekistan) Akhmedov	11	11	12	11
(United Arab Emirates) Alhawai	2	3	5
8	(China) Xiang P.	11	11	11

Round of 64
12	(India) Thakkar	14	10	10	11	11
(Indonesia) Junindra	12	12	12	6	8
(Kazakhstan) Zhubanov	10	9	1
24	(Singapore) Pang K.	12	11	11
23	(Chinese Taipei) Hung J.K.	11	11	11
(Turkmenistan) Allanazarov	3	2	4
(Uzbekistan) Akhmedov	9	5	4
8	(China) Xiang P.	11	11	11

Round of 32
12	(India) Thakkar	11	4	11	11
24	(Singapore) Pang K.	4	11	5	8
23	(Chinese Taipei) Hung J.K.	7	11	10	3
8	(China) Xiang P.	11	5	12	11

Round of 16
12	(India) Thakkar	11	2	3	8
8	(China) Xiang P.	6	11	11	11

==== Section 3 ====
Round of 128
5	(Japan) Togami
(Thailand) Prasongpol	w/o
(Maldives) Muhammad	3	2	4
(Sri Lanka) Ginige	11	11	11
(Oman) Albalushi	7	8	13	8
(Uzbekistan) Abdukodirov	11	11	11	11
(Macau) Zheng H.W.	3	3	3
25	(Kazakhstan) Kurmangaliyev	11	11	11
26	(Iran) Alamiyan	11	11	11
(Kyrgyzstan) Iakupbaev	5	4	4
(Uzbekistan) Dilshodov	12	11	9	12	9
(Indonesia) Zikri	10	7	11	14	11
(Jordan) Abo Yaman	12	9	8	3
(South Korea) Lim Y-o	10	11	11	11
(Singapore) Tan	2	6	5
9	(Chinese Taipei) Kuo G.H.	11	11	11

Round of 64
(Thailand) Prasongpol	11	11	8	11
(Sri Lanka) Ginige	6	4	11	3
(Uzbekistan) Abdukodirov	3	6	5
25	(Kazakhstan) Kurmangaliyev	11	11	11
26	(Iran) Alamiyan	10	11	11	11
(Indonesia) Zikri	12	5	4	9
(South Korea) Lim Y-o	3	11	9	7
9	(Chinese Taipei) Kuo G.H.	11	7	11	11

Round of 32
(Thailand) Prasongpol	2	6	5
25	(Kazakhstan) Kurmangaliyev	11	11	11
26	(Iran) Alamiyan	11	7	11	9	10
9	(Chinese Taipei) Kuo G.H.	9	11	3	11	12

Round of 16
25	(Kazakhstan) Kurmangaliyev	5	5	7
9	(Chinese Taipei) Kuo G.H.	11	11	11

==== Section 4 ====
Round of 128
10	(Hong Kong) Wong C.T.	11	11	11
(United Arab Emirates) Almarri	4	2	2
(Kuwait) Alhadad	11	11	7	7	11
(Bangladesh) Ahmed	9	5	11	11	8
(Oman) Al Balushi	1	7	2
(Qatar) Abdulwahhab A.	11	11	11
(Turkmenistan) Meredov	7	3	4
29	(Singapore) Chua J.	11	11	11
28	(South Korea) Kang D.	11	11	11
(Saudi Arabia) Hanifa	3	2	5
(Bahrain) Rashed	11	3	14	11
(Thailand) Mekamporn	7	11	12	5
(Philippines) Nayre	10	15	11	9	4
(Malaysia) Yap R.Z.	12	13	7	11	11

Round of 64
10	(Hong Kong) Wong C.T.	11	11	11
(Kuwait) Alhadad	0	0	0
(Qatar) Abdulwahhab A.	9	14	11	15
29	(Singapore) Chua J.	11	12	7	13
28	(South Korea) Kang D.	11	11	11
(Bahrain) Rashed	5	6	6
(Malaysia) Yap R.Z.	5	1	6
3	(China) Zhou Q.	11	11	11

Round of 32
10	(Hong Kong) Wong C.T.	11	13	11
29	(Singapore) Chua J.	6	11	2
28	(South Korea) Kang D.	11	11	12
3	(China) Zhou Q.	7	6	10

Round of 16
10	(Hong Kong) Wong C.T.	9	11	12	11
28	(South Korea) Kang D.	11	8	10	8

=== Bottom half ===
==== Section 5 ====
Round of 128
(Iran) Ghaffari	7	11	2	9
(Malaysia) Wong Q.S.	11	6	11	11
(Turkmenistan) Artykov	1	10	6
(Bangladesh) Bawm	11	12	11
(Thailand) Tancharoen	11	5	17	11	5
20	(Hong Kong) Lam S.H.	6	11	19	6	11
22	(India) Jain P.	8	11	6	4
(Singapore) Chew	11	4	11	11
(Bahrain) Abuhamda	16	11	11
(Saudi Arabia) Alsuwailem	14	3	7
(Jordan) Aldmaisy
(Kyrgyzstan) Sagyndykov	w/o
(Chinese Taipei) Tsai T.Y.	7	9	11	4
13	(Kazakhstan) Gerassimenko	11	11	4	11

Round of 64
4	(China) Wen R.	12	11	11	11
(Malaysia) Wong Q.S.	14	5	3	7
(Bangladesh) Bawm	2	3	3
20	(Hong Kong) Lam S.H.	11	11	11
(Singapore) Chew	11	11	9	11
(Bahrain) Abuhamda	8	7	11	9
(Kyrgyzstan) Sagyndykov	3	2	4
13	(Kazakhstan) Gerassimenko	11	11	11

Round of 32
4	(China) Wen R.	14	11	11	9	11
20	(Hong Kong) Lam S.H.	12	13	4	11	4
(Singapore) Chew	8	6	1
13	(Kazakhstan) Gerassimenko	11	11	11

Round of 16
4	(China) Wen R.	9	11	12	11
13	(Kazakhstan) Gerassimenko	11	7	10	7

==== Section 6 ====
Round of 128
11	(South Korea) Park Ga.	11	11	11
(Philippines) Valenet	9	6	6
(Sri Lanka) Kulappuwawadu	6	3	0
(Qatar) Abdulwahhab M.	11	11	11
(Indonesia) Pratama	11	11	11
(Oman) Al Rashdi	7	2	5
(Macau) Chan C. I.	11	4	5	4
30	(Chinese Taipei) Hsu H. C.	9	11	11	11
32	(Iran) Faraji	11	12	11
(Kuwait) Alkanderi	7	10	8
(Mongolia) Tuvshinjargal	7	6	5
(United Arab Emirates) Almusayebi	11	11	11
(Uzbekistan) Toliev	11	8	14	13
(Iraq) Hussein	8	11	12	11
(Saudi Arabia) Al Taher	6	3	5
6	(Japan) Shinozuka	11	11	11

Round of 64
11	(South Korea) Park Ga.	11	11	12
(Qatar) Abdulwahhab M.	7	9	10
(Indonesia) Pratama	12	11	11	14
30	(Chinese Taipei) Hsu H. C.	14	6	7	12
32	(Iran) Faraji	11	11	11
(United Arab Emirates) Almusayebi	7	2	9
(Uzbekistan) Toliev	4	4	5
6	(Japan) Shinozuka	11	11	11

Round of 32
11	(South Korea) Park Ga.	13	11	11
(Indonesia) Pratama	11	3	9
32	(Iran) Faraji	12	11	10	11
6	(Japan) Shinozuka	10	9	12	8

Round of 16
11	(South Korea) Park Ga.	11	15	11
32	(Iran) Faraji	6	13	5

==== Section 7 ====
Round of 128
7	(Chinese Taipei) Feng Y. H.	11	11	11
(Philippines) Yamson	4	5	7
(Tajikistan) Aliev	4	4	4
(Kazakhstan) Kenzhigulov	11	11	11
(Jordan) Al-Najadat	4	11	8	11	11
(Oman) Al Riyami	11	9	11	9	7
(Macau) Mak T. I.	4	6	8
17	(Japan) Tanaka	11	11	11
19	(Singapore) Quek	10	11	12	11
(Saudi Arabia) Bu Shulaybi	12	8	10	4
(Maldives) Ismail	6	11	14	6	4
(Thailand) Sanguansin	11	7	12	11	11
(Indonesia) Negara	11	11	11
(Kyrgyzstan) Moldaliev	2	7	7
(Kuwait) Alotaibi
16	(Hong Kong) Chan B.	w/o

Round of 64
7	(Chinese Taipei) Feng Y. H.	11	11	11
(Kazakhstan) Kenzhigulov	1	7	9
(Jordan) Al-Najadat	3	6	1
17	(Japan) Tanaka	11	11	11
19	(Singapore) Quek	11	11	11
(Thailand) Sanguansin	5	9	7
(Indonesia) Negara	6	3	10
16	(Hong Kong) Chan B.	11	11	12

Round of 32
7	(Chinese Taipei) Feng Y. H.	11	13	7	4	11
17	(Japan) Tanaka	4	11	11	11	6
19	(Singapore) Quek	11	11	11	11
16	(Hong Kong) Chan B.	6	9	13	4

Round of 16
7	(Chinese Taipei) Feng Y. H.	11	12	11	10	11
19	(Singapore) Quek	9	14	7	12	8

==== Section 8 ====
Round of 128
14	(China) Huang Y.	11	11	11
(Iran) Habibi	5	5	5
(Iraq) Hameed	11	11	9	11
(Sri Lanka) Kahawaththa	4	5	11	6
(Mongolia) Myandal	7	11	11	8	11
(Kuwait) Almkeemy	11	8	7	11	8
(United Arab Emirates) Almusayebi	2	7	7
21	(India) Desai	11	11	11
31	(South Korea) Kim M.	11	7	11	11
(Uzbekistan) Teshaboev	5	11	7	5
(Bahrain) Saleh A.	3	9	11	11	10
(Turkmenistan) Allanazarov	11	11	9	4	12
(Malaysia) Im J. Z.	11	6	5
(Hong Kong) Kwan M. H.	13	11	11

Round of 64
14	(China) Huang Y.	11	11	6	11
(Iraq) Hameed	8	5	11	3
(Mongolia) Myandal	3	2	7
21	(India) Desai	11	11	11
31	(South Korea) Kim M.	11	11	11
(Turkmenistan) Allanazarov	0	4	9
(Hong Kong) Kwan M. H.	8	6	10
2	(Japan) Harimoto T.	11	11	12

Round of 32
14	(China) Huang Y.	7	11	11	7	11
21	(India) Desai	11	7	7	11	6
31	(South Korea) Kim M.	11	6	7	13	5
2	(Japan) Harimoto T.	9	11	11	11	11

Round of 16
14	(China) Huang Y.	7	8	10
2	(Japan) Harimoto T.	11	11	12

== Qualification Play-offs (Round of 32 Losers) ==
- All round of 32 losers in the main draw will be placed in Match 1-8.
- Losers in Match 1-8 will move forward to position 25-32nd bracket. (Note: Zhou Qihao from China, and Hung Jing-kai from Chinese Taipei did not show up in Match 1-8. They will move forward to 25-32nd position bracket, but they still did not show up.)
- (Q) : players qualify in 2027 ITTF World Championship

=== Match 1 ===
Position 17-32 (Loser will move forward to 25-32 position bracket)
	(Sri Lanka) Silva S. (Q)	17	5	11	7	11
27	(Hong Kong) Yiu K.	15	11	8	11	9

=== Match 2 ===
Position 17-32 (Loser will move forward to 25-32 position bracket)
24	(Singapore) Pang K. (Q)	w/o
23	(Chinese Taipei) Hung J.K.

=== Match 3 ===
Position 17-32 (Loser will move forward to 25-32 position bracket)
	(Thailand) Prasongpol	4	14	8
26	(Iran) Alamiyan (Q)	11	16	11

=== Match 4 ===
Position 17-32 (Loser will move forward to 25-32 position bracket)
29	(Singapore) Chua J. (Q)	w/o
3	(China) Zhou Q.

=== Match 5 ===
Position 17-32 (Loser will move forward to 25-32 position bracket)
20	(Hong Kong) Lam S.H. (Q)	11	11	6	11
	(Singapore) Chew	8	4	11	6

=== Match 6 ===
Position 17-32 (Loser will move forward to 25-32 position bracket)
	(Indonesia) Pratama	11	6	12	9	6
6	(Japan) Shinozuka (Q)	3	11	10	11	11

=== Match 7 ===
Position 17-32 (Loser will move forward to 25-32 position bracket)
17	(Japan) Tanaka	8	5	7
16	(Hong Kong) Chan B. (Q)	11	11	11

=== Match 8 ===
Position 17-32 (Loser will move forward to 25-32 position bracket)
21	(India) Desai (Q)	7	11	2	11	11
31	(South Korea) Kim M.	11	9	11	8	6

=== 25–32nd position bracket ===
25–32nd Quarterfinals (Loser in Qualification Play-off Match 1-8 will be randomly placed in this bracket)
27	(Hong Kong) Yiu K.	w/o
23	(Chinese Taipei) Hung J.K.
(Thailand) Prasongpol	w/o
3	(China) Zhou Q.
(Singapore) Chew	13	11	11
(Indonesia) Pratama	11	5	6
17	(Japan) Tanaka	11	8	11	9	11
31	(South Korea) Kim M.	4	11	4	11	2

25–28th Semifinals
27	(Hong Kong) Yiu K.	11	11	11
(Thailand) Prasongpol	5	7	6
(Singapore) Chew	5	12	2	6
17	(Japan) Tanaka	11	10	11	11

25–26th Final (Match was not played since 25 and 26th both qualify)
27	(Hong Kong) Yiu K.	Q
17	(Japan) Tanaka	Q
27–28th Final
(Thailand) Prasongpol (Q)	11	11	5	11
(Singapore) Chew	8	3	11	5
