= 2016 Asian Junior and Cadet Table Tennis Championships =

Tournament details
- Dates: 16–21 September 2016
- Edition: 22nd
- Venue: Chanchai Acadium, Bangkokthonburi University
- Location: Bangkok, Thailand

The 2016 Asian Junior and Cadet Table Tennis Championships were held in Bangkok, Thailand, from 16 to 21 September 2016. It was organised by the Table Tennis Association of Thailand under the authority of the Asian Table Tennis Union (ATTU).

== Medal summary ==
=== Events ===
Event	Gold	Silver	Bronze
Junior boys' singles	China; Xu Haidong	China; Yu Heyi	South Korea; Cho Seungmin
Junior boys' singles	China; Xu Haidong	China; Yu Heyi	South Korea; An Jaehyun
Junior girls' singles	China; Qian Tianyi	China; Yuan Yuan	China; Sun Mingyang
Junior girls' singles	China; Qian Tianyi	China; Yuan Yuan	Hong Kong; Soo Wai Yam Minnie
Junior boys' doubles	North Korea; Ko Un Gum; Ham Yu Song	China; Yu Heyi; Yang Shuo	South Korea; Cho Seungmin; An Jaehyun
Junior boys' doubles	North Korea; Ko Un Gum; Ham Yu Song	China; Yu Heyi; Yang Shuo	Japan; Yuto Kizukuri; Ryotaro Ogata
Junior girls' doubles	Hong Kong; Soo Wai Yam Minnie; Mak Tze Wing	China; Qian Tianyi; Sun Mingyang	South Korea; Kim Jiho; Kang Dayeon
Junior girls' doubles	Hong Kong; Soo Wai Yam Minnie; Mak Tze Wing	China; Qian Tianyi; Sun Mingyang	Japan; Maki Shiomi; Miyu Nagasaki
Junior mixed doubles	China; Cao Wei; Shi Xunyao	China; Yang Shuo; Qian Tianyi	South Korea; Cho Seungmin; Kim Jiho
Junior mixed doubles	China; Cao Wei; Shi Xunyao	China; Yang Shuo; Qian Tianyi	North Korea; Ko Un Gum; Kim Song Gun
Junior boys' team	South Korea; Cho Daeseong; An Jaehyun; Hwang Minha; Baek Hogyun	China; Yu Heyi; Yang Shuo; Cao Wei; Xu Haidong	Japan; Yuto Kizukuri; Tonin Ryuzaki; Ryotaro Ogata; Takuto Izumo
Junior boys' team	South Korea; Cho Daeseong; An Jaehyun; Hwang Minha; Baek Hogyun	China; Yu Heyi; Yang Shuo; Cao Wei; Xu Haidong	Hong Kong; Ng Pak Nam; Kwan Man Ho; Lau Chun Kit; Leung Ho Ching Hocking
Junior girls' team	China; He Zhuojia; Sun Yingsha; Qian Tianyi; Sun Mingyang	Japan; Mima Ito; Miu Hirano; Maki Shiomi; Miyu Nagasaki	South Korea; Kim Jiho; Kang Dayeon; Heo Miryeo; Choi Yelin
Junior girls' team	China; He Zhuojia; Sun Yingsha; Qian Tianyi; Sun Mingyang	Japan; Mima Ito; Miu Hirano; Maki Shiomi; Miyu Nagasaki	Hong Kong; Soo Wai Yam Minnie; Mak Tze Wing; Liu Qi; Fung Wai Chu
Cadet boys' singles	China; Niu Guankai	Japan; Tomokazu Harimoto	Chinese Taipei; Tai Ming-Wei
Cadet boys' singles	China; Niu Guankai	Japan; Tomokazu Harimoto	South Korea; Cho Daeseong
Cadet girls' singles	China; Shi Xunyao	Japan; Miyuu Kihara	South Korea; Ryu Hanna
Cadet girls' singles	China; Shi Xunyao	Japan; Miyuu Kihara	Japan; Yuka Minagawa
Cadet boys' team	Japan; Tomokazu Harimoto; Yukiya Uda; Shunsuke Togami	South Korea; Woo Hyeonggyu; Cho Daeseong; Kang Jinho	China; Niu Guankai; Xie Congfan; Song Zhuoheng
Cadet boys' team	Japan; Tomokazu Harimoto; Yukiya Uda; Shunsuke Togami	South Korea; Woo Hyeonggyu; Cho Daeseong; Kang Jinho	Thailand; Yanapong Panagitgun; Veerapat Puthikungasern; Supakron Pankhaoyoy
Cadet girls' team	China; Shi Xunyao; Yuan Yuan; Huang Yingqi	Japan; Yuka Minagawa; Miyuu Kihara; Satsuki Odo	Hong Kong; Lee Ka Yee; Leung Ka Wan; Wong Chin Yau
Cadet girls' team	China; Shi Xunyao; Yuan Yuan; Huang Yingqi	Japan; Yuka Minagawa; Miyuu Kihara; Satsuki Odo	Chinese Taipei; Chien Tung-Chuan; Tsai Yu-Chin; Huang Yu-Jie

=== Medal table ===
* Host nation (Thailand)

Rank	Nation	Gold	Silver	Bronze	Total
1	China	7	6	2	15
2	Japan	1	4	4	9
3	South Korea	1	1	8	10
4	Hong Kong	1	0	4	5
5	North Korea	1	0	1	2
6	Chinese Taipei	0	0	2	2
7	Thailand*	0	0	1	1
Totals (7 entries)		11	11	22	44

== See also ==
- 2016 World Junior Table Tennis Championships
- Asian Table Tennis Championships
- Asian Table Tennis Union
