= 2024 World Cup =

2024 World Cup may refer to:

- 2024 cricketing world cups
  - 2024 ICC Men's T20 World Cup, men's twenty20 cricket
  - 2024 ICC Women's T20 World Cup, women's twenty20 cricket
  - 2024 Under-19 Cricket World Cup, men's under-19 cricket
- 2024 FIFA Futsal World Cup
- 2024 FIFA Beach Soccer World Cup
- 2024 FIG Artistic Gymnastics World Cup series
- 2024 Hockey5s World Cup, 5-a-side field hockey including goalies
- 2024 PDC World Cup of Darts
- 2024 ITTF Men's World Cup, in table tennis
- 2024 ITTF Women's World Cup, in table tennis

== See also ==
- 2024 in sports
