= 2026 Asian Table Tennis Championships – Men's team =

Men's team at the 2026 Asian Table Tennis Championships
- Venue: Olimpiya shaharchasi
- Date: 19–25 October 2026
- Nations: 28

The men's team in table tennis at the 2026 Asian Table Tennis Championships will be held at Olimpiya shaharchasi in Tashkent, Uzbekistan, from 19 to 25 October 2026.

== Format ==
All matches in the team events will be played as a best-of-five series of individual matches, with the following order of play:

Match 1	Match 2	Match 3	Match 4	Match 5
A vs X	B vs Y	C vs Z	A vs Y	B vs X

The team event is divided into two divisions:

=== First Division ===
- All teams, excluding the top six finishers from the 2025 edition, will compete in the First Division.
- Teams are divided into multiple round-robin groups.
- The winners and runners-up of each group advance to the First Division knockout stage. (Note: Runners-up can now compete for Champions Division for this edition. This is the one of the new changes this year.)
- The winners of the two First Division semifinals progress to join the Champion Division. (Note: Remaining teams do not play in position ranking bracket for this edition.)

=== Champion Division ===
- It consists of:
  - The top six teams from the 2025 edition.
  - The two winners of the First Division semifinals in the 2026 edition.
- Play begins directly in the quarterfinals in an eight-team knockout bracket.
- Teams defeated in the quarterfinals will play in position brackets to determine their final positions.

== Match Summary ==
=== First Division Knockout Stage ===
Iran and Kazakhstan Men's Team entered Champion Division after beating Singapore and Iraq respectively.

=== Champion Division ===
==== Quarterfinals ====
This is the third consecutive encounter between China and Iran in Asian Team Championships Quarterfinals. Benyamin Faraji pulls an upset over World Champion Wang Chuqin and Lin Shidong in 2024 and 2025. In this edition, Lin Shidong gets his revenge and winning Faraji 3-1 in the first match. Xiang Peng and Zhou Qihao were never played in Asian Team championships before, but they managed to beat Noshad Alamian and Nima Alamian 3-0 in the subsequent second and third match, which helps China conclude 3-0 victory.

==== Semifinals ====
In Semifinal 1, China met Chinese Taipei. It was the rematch of 2024 Final. Huang Youzheng was playing his first match in Asian Team championships and starting for Team China, which ends up 2-3 tight loss to Kuo Guan-hong. Lin Shidong wins second and fourth matches, and Zhou Qihao wins the third match. China comes back winning 3-1 after trailing 0-1.

In Semifinal 2 between Korea Republic and Japan, Korean defender Kang Dongsoo pulled up two victories over Japan's Hiroto Shinozuka 3-0 and Tomokazu Harimoto 3-1. Park Gyuhyeon pulled up 3-0 over current World number one Sora Matsushima. Overall, Korea Republic beats Japan 3-1. Japan captures bronze medal for second consecutive editions where Korea Republic enters Final since 2021.

==== Final ====
The final of this edition is between defending champion China and Korea Republic. Every player, except Lin Shidong, did not play in Asian Championship Team's final before.

The first match is between China's Zhou Qihao and Korea's Kang Dongsoo. Zhou's 3-1 victory helps China earn the first match.

Second Match is between Lin Shidong and Park Gyuhyeon. Lin dominates Park 3-0 and extends China's lead.

The turning point of the match is between Xiang Peng and Park Ganghyeon. Xiang lost to Park Ganghyeon 3-0 in WTT Taiyuan 2026, but Xiang managed to get his revenge and pull up 3-1 victory. This victory indicates China continues to defend their titles in four consecutive editions.

== Seeding ==
The seeding was based on ITTF Men's Team Ranking on October. (Note: Seedings based on ITTF Team Rankings is one of the new changes this year.)The top 6 teams directly qualified for the Champions Division.

=== Teams playing in Champions Division ===
Seed	Team	Player 1	Player 2	Player 3	Player 4	Player 5
1	China	Lin Shidong	Wen Ruibo	Zhou Qihao	Xiang Peng	Huang Youzheng
2	Japan	Harimoto Tomokazu	Matsushima Sora	~~Togami Shunsuke~~ (Note: Shunsuke Togami withdrew all the matches for this edition due to sickness.)	Shinozuka Hiroto	Tanaka Yuta
3	Chinese Taipei	Feng Yi-Hsin	Hsu Hsien-Chia	Hung Jing-Kai	Kuo Guan-Hong	Tsai Tien-Yu
4	(South Korea) Korea Republic	Kang Dongsoo	Kim Minhyeok	Park Ganghyeon	Lim Yunoh	Park Gyuhyeon
5	Hong Kong, China	Wong Chun Ting	Chan Baldwin	Lam Siu Hang	Yiu Kwan To	Kwan Man Ho
6	India	Manav Thakkar	Harmeet Desai	Payas Jain	—	—

=== Teams playing in First Division ===
(Q): Qualified to Champion Division

Seed	Team	Player 1	Player 2	Player 3	Player 4	Player 5
7	Kazakhstan (Q)	Kirill Gerassimenko	Alan Kurmangaliyev	Aidos Kenzhigulov	Sanzhar Zhubanov	Iskender Kharki
8	Singapore	Pang Koen	Izaac Quek	Chua Josh	Clarence Chew	Nicholas Tan
9	Iran (Q)	Nima Alamian	Noshad Alamiyan	Benyamin Faraji	Aryan Ghaffari	Mohammad Habibi
10	Thailand	Phakpoom Sanguansin	Sarayut Tancharoen	Thitaphat Preechayan	Nawachet Prasongpol	Nawin Mekamporn
11	Malaysia	Wong Qi Shen	Choong Javen	Im Jin Zhen	Yap Rui Zhe	—
12	Uzbekistan	Khurshid Akhmedov	Shokhrukh Iskandarov	Diyorbek Dilshodov	Kutbidillo Teshaboev	Musobek Toliev
13	Mongolia	Ankhbayar Bilguun	Bilguun Enkh-Amgalan	Bat Orgil Lodoidamba	Temuulen Myandal	—
14	Bahrain	Salman Abuhamda	Rashed Rashed	Ali Saleh	Mohumed Saleh	—
15	Saudi Arabia	Abdulrahman Al Taher	Ali Alkhadrawi	Abdulaziz Bu Shulaybi	Salem Alsuwailem	Yousuf Hanifa
16	Macau, China	Chan Chi In	Wang Chun	Mak Tin Ian	Zheng Hong Wai	—
17	Indonesia	Muhammad Junindra	Muhammad Negara	Affan Pratama	Taufiq Zikri	Braydon Susilo
18	Kyrgyzstan	Azamat Ergeshov	Alisher Iakupbaev	Tilek Moldaliev	Talgat Sagyndykov	—
19	Sri Lanka	Chameera Ginige	Nuwantha Kahawaththa	Chanul Kulappuwawadu	Senura Silva	—
20	Bangladesh	Mohutasin Ridoy	Ramhimlian Bawm	Md Javed Ahmed	—	—
21	Oman	Muhannad Al Balushi	Ghassan Al Ghassani	Bilal Al Rashdi	Ahmed Al Riyami	Nasser Albalushi
22	Iraq	Anwer Hameed	Pires Hussein	Mohammed Taher	—	—
23	Tajikistan	Abdullo Abdukodirov	Mustafo Aliev	Rustamjon Fuzaili	Nekruz Odinaev	Ubaidullo Sultonov
24	Philippines	John Russel Misal	Jann Mari Nayre	Eljey Tormis	Edouard Valenet	Elijah Yamson
25	Jordan	Zaid Abo Yaman	Taqi Al-Din Al-Najadat	Zeyad Aldmaisy	—	—
26	Kuwait	Abdullah Albahrani	Abdullah Alhadad	Meshal Alkanderi	Abdullah Almkeemy	Meshal Alotaibi
27	Turkmenistan	Ylyas Allanazarov	Vepa Meredov	Dortguly Allanazarov	Mukam Artykov	—
28	United Arab Emirates	Yousef Alhawai	Nasser Almarri	Ahmed Almusayebi	Mohammed Almusayebi	—

== First Division ==
=== Group Stage ===
==== Group 1 ====
Pos	Team	Pld	W	L	Pts	Promotion	(Kazakhstan) KAZ (7)	(Philippines) PHI (24)	(Sri Lanka) SRI (19)
1	Kazakhstan (7)	2	2	0	4	First Division Knockout Stage	—	3–0	3–1
2	Philippines (24)	2	1	1	3	First Division Knockout Stage	0–3	—	3–2
3	Sri Lanka (19)	2	0	2	2		1–3	2–3	—

Updated to match(es) played on 2026-10-19. Source: ITTF

==== Group 2 ====
Pos	Team	Pld	W	L	Pts	Promotion	(Singapore) SGP (8)	(Indonesia) INA (17)	(Tajikistan) TJK (23)
1	Singapore (8)	2	2	0	4	First Division Knockout Stage	—	3–0	3–0
2	Indonesia (17)	2	1	1	3	First Division Knockout Stage	0–3	—	3–0
3	Tajikistan (23)	2	0	2	2		0–3	0–3	—

Updated to match(es) played on 2026-10-19. Source: ITTF

==== Group 3 ====
Pos	Team	Pld	W	L	Pts	Promotion	(Iran) IRI (9)	(Iraq) IRQ (22)	(Bangladesh) BAN (20)
1	Iran (9)	2	2	0	4	First Division Knockout Stage	—	3–1	3–0
2	Iraq (22)	2	1	1	3	First Division Knockout Stage	1–3	—	3–0
3	Bangladesh (20)	2	0	2	2		0–3	0–3	—

Updated to match(es) played on 2026-10-19. Source: ITTF

==== Group 4 ====
Pos	Team	Pld	W	L	Pts	Promotion	(Thailand) THA (10)	(Kyrgyzstan) KGZ (18)	(Oman) OMA (21)
1	Thailand (10)	2	2	0	4	First Division Knockout Stage	—	3–0	3–0
2	Kyrgyzstan (18)	2	1	1	3	First Division Knockout Stage	0–3	—	3–0
3	Oman (21)	2	0	2	2		0–3	0–3	—

Updated to match(es) played on 2026-10-19. Source: ITTF

==== Group 5 ====
Pos	Team	Pld	W	L	Pts	Promotion	(Malaysia) MAS (11)	(Macau) MAC (16)	(United Arab Emirates) UAE (28)
1	Malaysia (11)	2	2	0	4	First Division Knockout Stage	—	3–2	3–0
2	Macau, China (16)	2	1	1	3	First Division Knockout Stage	2–3	—	3–0
3	United Arab Emirates (28)	2	0	2	2		0–3	0–3	—

Updated to match(es) played on 2026-10-19. Source: ITTF

==== Group 6 ====
Pos	Team	Pld	W	L	Pts	Promotion	(Saudi Arabia) KSA (15)	(Uzbekistan) UZB (12)	(Turkmenistan) TKM (27)
1	Saudi Arabia (15)	2	2	0	4	First Division Knockout Stage	—	3–0	3–0
2	Uzbekistan (12)	2	1	1	3	First Division Knockout Stage	0–3	—	3–0
3	Turkmenistan (27)	2	0	2	2		0–3	0–3	—

Updated to match(es) played on 2026-10-19. Source: ITTF

==== Group 7 ====
Pos	Team	Pld	W	L	Pts	Promotion	(Bahrain) BHR (14)	(Jordan) JOR (25)	(Mongolia) MGL (13)	(Kuwait) KUW (26)
1	Bahrain (14)	3	3	0	6	First Division Knockout Stage	—	3–1	3–0	3–1
2	Jordan (25)	3	2	1	5	First Division Knockout Stage	1–3	—	3–1	3–1
3	Mongolia (13)	3	1	2	4		0–3	1–3	—	3–2
4	Kuwait (26)	3	0	3	3		1–3	1–3	2–3	—

Updated to match(es) played on 2026-10-19. Source: ITTF

=== First Division Knockout Stage ===
==== Section 1 ====
Preliminary 1
(17)	Indonesia	1
(11)	Malaysia	3
(22)	Iraq	3
(25)	Jordan	2
(12)	Uzbekistan	1
(10)	Thailand	3

Preliminary 2
(7)	Kazakhstan	3
(11)	Malaysia	0
(22)	Iraq	3
(10)	Thailand	2

Preliminary 3 (Winners advance to Champions Division)
(7)	Kazakhstan (Q)	3
(22)	Iraq	0

==== Section 2 ====
Preliminary 1
(9)	Iran	3
(16)	Macau, China	0
(24)	Philippines	1
(15)	Saudi Arabia	3
(14)	Bahrain	3
(18)	Kyrgyzstan	0

Preliminary 2
(9)	Iran	3
(15)	Saudi Arabia	1
(14)	Bahrain	0
(8)	Singapore	3

Preliminary 3 (Winners advance to Champions Division)
(9)	Iran (Q)	3
(8)	Singapore	0

== Champion Division ==
Quarterfinals (lost teams in QF will be playing in 5-8th position matches)
(1)	China	3
(9)	Iran (Q)	0
(5)	Hong Kong, China	0
(3)	Chinese Taipei	3
(4)	(South Korea) Korea Republic	3
(6)	India	0
(7)	Kazakhstan (Q)	2
(2)	Japan	3

Semifinals
(1)	China	3
(3)	Chinese Taipei (bronze)	1
(4)	(South Korea) Korea Republic	3
(2)	Japan (bronze)	1

Final
(1)	China (gold)	3
(4)	(South Korea) Korea Republic (silver)	0

=== 5-8th Position Matches ===
(Note: Iran and India Men's Team win the 5-8th position match, which indicates they will be seeded in the next edition. Hong Kong, China and Kazakhstan will be in the First Division for the next edition.)

5-8th Position Match 1
(9)	Iran	3
(5)	Hong Kong, China	0

5-8th Position Match 2
(6)	India	3
(7)	Kazakhstan	0
