= ITTF World Tour Grand Finals =

Annual table tennis tournament

The ITTF World Tour Grand Finals, formerly named ITTF Pro Tour Grand Finals, was an annual table tennis tournament sanctioned by International Table Tennis Federation (ITTF) at the end of the year. The tournament included seven events: men's and women's singles, men's and women's doubles, mixed doubles (new in 2018), U21 men's and women's singles. Players who accumulated the largest number of points on the ITTF World Tour were qualified for the event, and competing for total prize money of US$1,000,000, the biggest total prize money event in the ITTF calendar.

Since 2021, the ITTF World Tour Grand Finals has been effectively replaced by the newly created WTT Cup Finals, which was renamed to WTT Finals in 2023.

== Qualification сriteria ==
=== Men's and women's singles ===
- Attend at least 5 events at ITTF World Tour.
- The top 15 men and 15 women who have accumulated the largest number of points on World Tour standing are invited.
- The ITTF will invite one player from to the host association provided that they played at least 5 events at ITTF World Tour.
- If a player from the host association is already among the 15 invited players or no player from the host association had attended at least 5 events at ITTF World Tour, then the 16th player in order will be invited.

=== Men's and women's doubles ===
- The same pair has to play at least 4 events at ITTF World Tour.
- The top 7 men's and 7 women's doubles pairs who have accumulated the largest number of points, as a pair, on World Tour standing are invited.
- The ITTF will invite one pair from the host association given that the pair played at least 4 events at ITTF World Tour.
- If a pair from the host association is already among the 7 invited pairs or no pair from the host association had attended at least 4 events at ITTF World Tour, then the 8th pair in order will be invited.
- If a player appears in two or more double pairs, only the highest double will be qualified.

=== Mixed doubles ===
- The same pair has to play at least 2 events at ITTF World Tour.
- The top 7 doubles who have accumulated the largest number of points, as a pair, on World Tour standing are invited.
- The ITTF will invite one pair from the host association given that the pair played at least 2 events at ITTF World Tour.
- If a pair from the host association is already among the 7 invited pairs or no pair from the host association had attended at least 2 events at ITTF World Tour, then the 8th pair in order will be invited.
- If a player appears in two or more double pairs, only the highest double will be qualified.

=== U21 men's and women's singles ===
- Attend 4 events in at least 2 continents at ITTF World Tour.
- The top 8 on the World Tour standing are qualified.

If more than 1 player or pair have the same ranking on the World Tour standing when they compete for the last spot, the spot belongs to the player or the pair with higher ITTF world ranking.

== Playing systems ==
All the matches in World Tour Grand Finals are played best of 7 games with the exception of the first round of men's doubles and women's doubles, which are played as a best of 5 games.

Seeding of the players and pairs are determined by the final order of the World Tour standings.

=== Men's and women's singles, doubles ===
16 players (or 8 pairs in doubles) advance towards next round under a knockout system. The top 8 players (or the top 4 pairs in doubles) on the World Tour standing will avoid playing each other in the first round.

=== U21 men's and women's singles ===
8 players are at first separated into two groups. After playing a round-robin, the top 2 players in each group advance towards a knockout.

== Winners ==
- List of winners at ITTF World Tour Grand Finals:

Location	Year	Men's Singles	Women's Singles	Men's Doubles	Women's Doubles	Mixed Doubles
(China) Tianjin	1996	(China) Kong Linghui	(China) Deng Yaping	(China) Wang Liqin (China) Yan Sen	(China) Deng Yaping (China) Yang Ying	
Hong Kong	1997	(Belarus) Vladimir Samsonov	(China) Li Ju	(China) Kong Linghui (China) Liu Guoliang	(China) Li Ju (China) Wang Nan	
(France) Paris	1998	(China) Wang Liqin	(China) Wang Nan	(China) Wang Liqin (China) Yan Sen	(China) Li Ju (China) Wang Nan	
(Australia) Sydney	1999	(China) Liu Guozheng	(Chinese Taipei) Chen Jing	(China) Kong Linghui (China) Ma Lin	(China) Li Ju (China) Wang Nan	
(Japan) Kobe	2000	(China) Wang Liqin	(China) Zhang Yining	(China) Wang Liqin (China) Yan Sen	(China) Sun Jin (China) Yang Ying	
(China) Hainan	2001	(China) Ma Lin	(China) Wang Nan	(South Korea) Kim Taek-Soo (South Korea) Oh Sang-Eun	(South Korea) Lee Eun-Sil (South Korea) Ryu Ji-Hae	
(Sweden) Stockholm	2002	(Chinese Taipei) Chuang Chih-yuan	(China) Zhang Yining	(China) Kong Linghui (China) Ma Lin	(China) Li Jia (China) Niu Jianfeng	
(China) Guangzhou	2003	(China) Wang Hao	(China) Niu Jianfeng	(China) Ma Lin (China) Chen Qi	(China) Guo Yue (China) Niu Jianfeng	
(China) Beijing	2004	(China) Wang Liqin	(China) Guo Yue	(China) Ma Lin (China) Chen Qi	(China) Wang Nan (China) Zhang Yining	
(China) Fuzhou	2005	(Germany) Timo Boll	(China) Zhang Yining	(Germany) Timo Boll (Germany) Christian Süß	(United States) Gao Jun (Spain) Shen Yanfei	
Hong Kong	2006	(China) Wang Hao	(China) Zhang Yining	(China) Hao Shuai (China) Ma Long	(China) Wang Nan (China) Zhang Yining	
(China) Beijing	2007	(China) Ma Lin	(China) Li Xiaoxia	(China) Wang Liqin (China) Chen Qi	(China) Guo Yue (China) Li Xiaoxia	
Macau	2008	(China) Ma Long	(China) Guo Yan	(Singapore) Gao Ning (Singapore) Yang Zi	(Singapore) Li Jiawei (Singapore) Sun Beibei	
Macau	2009	(China) Ma Long	(China) Guo Yan	(Germany) Timo Boll (Germany) Christian Süß	(China) Ding Ning (China) Liu Shiwen	
(South Korea) Seoul	2010	(Japan) Jun Mizutani	(Singapore) Feng Tianwei	(Hong Kong) Jiang Tianyi (Hong Kong) Tang Peng	(South Korea) Kim Kyung-Ah (South Korea) Park Mi-Young	
(United Kingdom) London	2011	(China) Ma Long	(China) Liu Shiwen	(China) Ma Lin (China) Zhang Jike	(China) Guo Yue (China) Li Xiaoxia	
(China) Hangzhou	2012	(China) Xu Xin	(China) Liu Shiwen	(Singapore) Gao Ning (Singapore) Li Hu	(Singapore) Feng Tianwei (Singapore) Yu Mengyu	
(United Arab Emirates) Dubai	2013	(China) Xu Xin	(China) Liu Shiwen	(Singapore) Gao Ning (Singapore) Li Hu	(China) Ding Ning (China) Li Xiaoxia	
(Thailand) Bangkok	2014	(Japan) Jun Mizutani	(Japan) Kasumi Ishikawa	(South Korea) Cho Eon-Rae (South Korea) Seo Hyun-Deok	(Japan) Miu Hirano (Japan) Mima Ito	
(Portugal) Lisbon	2015	(China) Ma Long	(China) Ding Ning	(Japan) Masataka Morizono (Japan) Yuya Oshima	(China) Ding Ning (China) Zhu Yuling	
(Qatar) Doha	2016	(China) Ma Long	(China) Zhu Yuling	(South Korea) Jung Young-sik (South Korea) Lee Sang-su	(Japan) Yui Hamamoto (Japan) Hina Hayata	
(Kazakhstan) Astana	2017	(China) Fan Zhendong	(China) Chen Meng	(Japan) Masataka Morizono (Japan) Yuya Oshima	(China) Chen Meng (China) Zhu Yuling	
(South Korea) Incheon	2018	(Japan) Tomokazu Harimoto	(China) Chen Meng	(South Korea) Jang Woo-jin (South Korea) Lim Jonghoon	(Japan) Mima Ito (Japan) Hina Hayata	(Hong Kong) Wong Chun Ting (Hong Kong) Doo Hoi Kem
(China) Zhengzhou	2019	(China) Fan Zhendong	(China) Chen Meng	(China) Fan Zhendong (China) Xu Xin	(Japan) Miyuu Kihara (Japan) Miyu Nagasaki	(China) Xu Xin (China) Liu Shiwen
(China) Zhengzhou	2020	(China) Ma Long	(China) Chen Meng			

== See also ==
- ITTF World Tour
