= 2016 World Junior Table Tennis Championships =

Table tennis tournament in South Africa

Tournament details
- Dates: 30 November – 7 December 2016
- Edition: 14th
- Venue: GrandWest Grand Arena
- Location: Cape Town, South Africa

The 2016 World Junior Table Tennis Championships were held in Cape Town, South Africa, from 30 November to 7 December 2016. It was organised by the South Africa Table Tennis Board (SATTB) under the auspices and authority of the International Table Tennis Federation (ITTF).

== Medal summary ==
=== Events ===
Event	Gold	Silver	Bronze
Boys' singles	Japan; Tomokazu Harimoto	South Korea; Cho Seung-min	China; Yang Shuo
Boys' singles	Japan; Tomokazu Harimoto	South Korea; Cho Seung-min	Hong Kong; Ng Pak Nam
Girls' singles	China; Shi Xunyao	Hong Kong; Mak Tze Wing	Japan; Miyu Kato
Girls' singles	China; Shi Xunyao	Hong Kong; Mak Tze Wing	Romania; Adina Diaconu
Boys' doubles	South Korea; An Jaehyun; Cho Seung-min	Japan; Tomokazu Harimoto; Tonin Ryuzaki	Chinese Taipei; Huang Chien-tu; Lin Yun-ju
Boys' doubles	South Korea; An Jaehyun; Cho Seung-min	Japan; Tomokazu Harimoto; Tonin Ryuzaki	France; Alexandre Cassin; Joe Seyfried
Girls' doubles	Romania; Adina Diaconu; Andreea Dragoman	Japan; Hina Hayata; Miyu Kato	Hong Kong; Liu Qi; Wong Chin Yau
Girls' doubles	Romania; Adina Diaconu; Andreea Dragoman	Japan; Hina Hayata; Miyu Kato	Hong Kong; Mak Tze Wing; Minnie Soo Wai Yam
Mixed doubles	South Korea; Choi Seung-min; Kim Jiho	Japan; Yuki Matsuyama; Hina Hayata	China; Xu Haidong; Yuan Yuan
Mixed doubles	South Korea; Choi Seung-min; Kim Jiho	Japan; Yuki Matsuyama; Hina Hayata	(Slovenia) Darko Jorgic (Serbia) Izabela Lupulesku
Boys' team	Japan; Tomokazu Harimoto; Yuto Kizukuri; Yuki Matsuyama; Tonin Ryuzaki	South Korea; An Jaehyun; Kim Daewoo; Cho Seungmin; Cho Daeseong	China; Xu Haidong; Xu Yingbin; Yang Shuo; Yu Heyi
Boys' team	Japan; Tomokazu Harimoto; Yuto Kizukuri; Yuki Matsuyama; Tonin Ryuzaki	South Korea; An Jaehyun; Kim Daewoo; Cho Seungmin; Cho Daeseong	Chinese Taipei; Huang Chien-Tu; Lin Yun-Ju; Feng Yi-Hsin; Tai Ming-Wei
Girls' team	Japan; Miu Hirano; Mima Ito; Miyu Kato; Hina Hayata	China; Liu Weishan; Sun Yizhen; Shi Xunyao; Yuan Yuan	Hong Kong; Mak Tze Wing; Soo Wai Yam Minnie; Liu Qi; Wong Chin Yau
Girls' team	Japan; Miu Hirano; Mima Ito; Miyu Kato; Hina Hayata	China; Liu Weishan; Sun Yizhen; Shi Xunyao; Yuan Yuan	South Korea; Heo Miryeo; Kim Youjin; Kang Dayeon; Kim Jiho

=== Medal table ===
Rank	Nation	Gold	Silver	Bronze	Total
1	Japan	3	3	1	7
2	South Korea	2	2	1	5
3	China	1	1	3	5
4	Romania	1	0	1	2
5	Hong Kong	0	1	4	5
6	Chinese Taipei	0	0	2	2
7	France	0	0	1	1
8	Serbia	0	0	0.5	0.5
8	Slovenia	0	0	0.5	0.5
Totals (9 entries)		7	7	14	28

== See also ==
- 2016 World Team Table Tennis Championships
- 2016 ITTF World Tour
