= Tomokazu Harimoto =

Japanese table tennis player (born 2003)

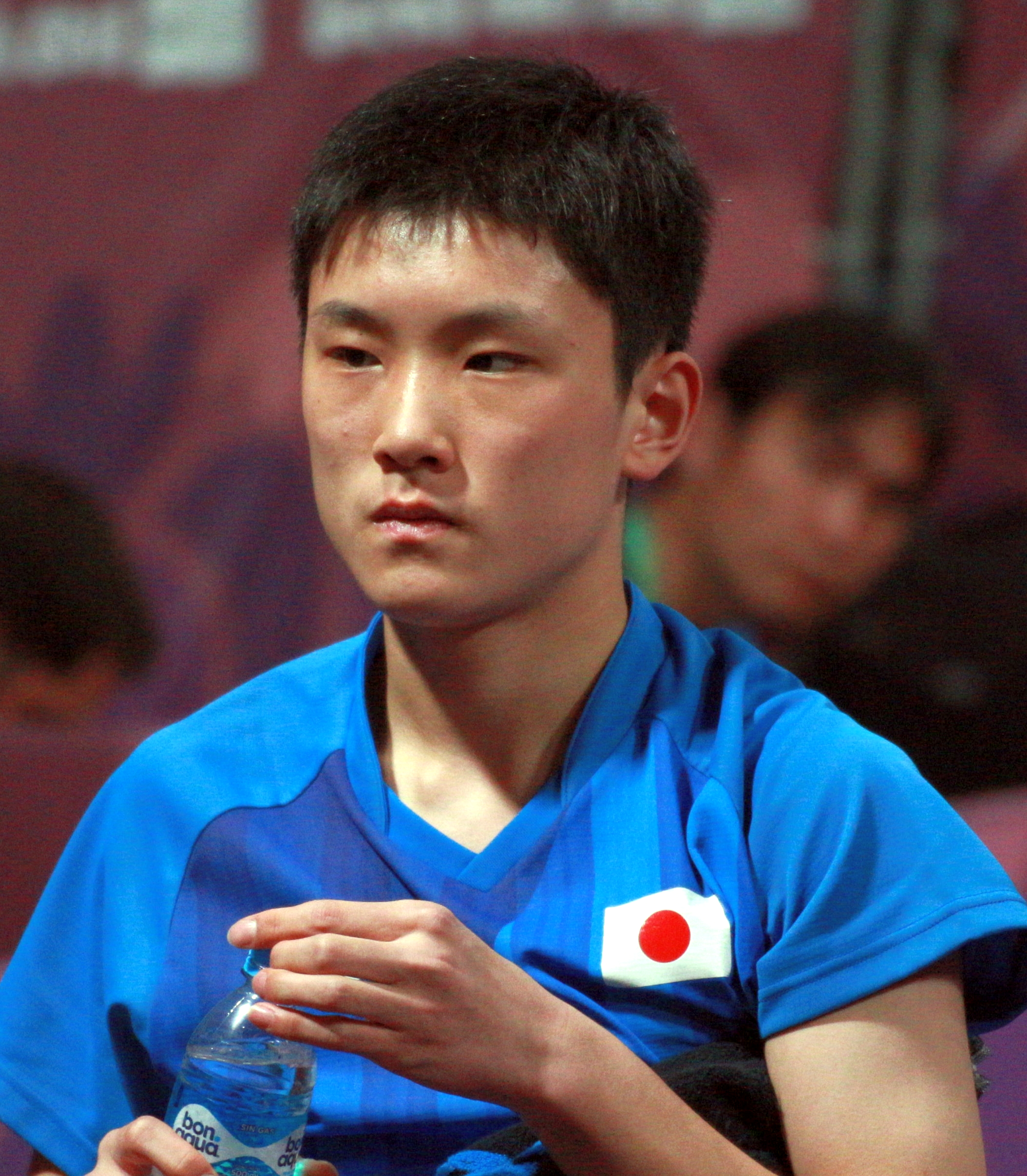
- Harimoto at the 2018 Youth Olympics Final

Personal information
- Nationality: China (before 2014); Japan (after 2014)
- Born: Zhang Zhihe (张智和); 27 June 2003 (age 23) Sendai, Miyagi, Japan
- Height: 1.78 m (5 ft 10 in)
- Weight: 64 kg (141 lb)

Sport
- Sport: Table tennis
- Club: Okayama Rivets (T.League)
- Playing style: Right-handed, shakehand grip
- Equipment: Butterfly Harimoto Tomokazu Innerforce Super ALC, Butterfly Zyre 03 (Forehand) Zyre 03 (Backhand)
- Highest ranking: 2 (22 November 2022)
- Current ranking: 2 (9 November 2026)
Medal record
Men's table tennis
Representing Japan
Event	1st	2nd	3rd
Olympic Games	0	0	1
World Championships	0	3	1
World Cup	0	3	4
Total	0	6	6
Olympic Games
Bronze medal – third place	2020 Tokyo	Team
World Championships
Silver medal – second place	2021 Houston	Mixed doubles
Silver medal – second place	2023 Durban	Mixed doubles
Silver medal – second place	2026 London	Team
Bronze medal – third place	2022 Chengdu	Team
World Cup
Silver medal – second place	2018 London	Team
Silver medal – second place	2019 Chengdu	Singles
Silver medal – second place	2025 Chengdu	Mixed team
Bronze medal – third place	2019 Tokyo	Team
Bronze medal – third place	2020 Weihai	Singles
Bronze medal – third place	2023 Chengdu	Mixed team
Bronze medal – third place	2024 Macao	Singles
WTT Cup Finals
Gold medal – first place	2025 Hong Kong	Singles
Silver medal – second place	2021 Singapore	Singles
Silver medal – second place	2022 Xinxiang	Singles
Silver medal – second place	2024 Fukuoka	Singles
ITTF World Tour Grand Finals
Gold medal – first place	2018 Incheon	Singles
Asian Games
Gold medal – first place	2026 Aichi-Nagoya	Team
Silver medal – second place	2026 Aichi-Nagoya	Doubles
Asian Championships
Gold medal – first place	2024 Astana	Singles
Gold medal – first place	2026 Tashkent	Singles
Bronze medal – third place	2017 Wuxi	Team
Bronze medal – third place	2019 Yogyakarta	Singles
Bronze medal – third place	2019 Yogyakarta	Team
Bronze medal – third place	2025 Bhubaneswar	Team
Bronze medal – third place	2026 Tashkent	Team
Asian Cup
Gold medal – first place	2022 Bangkok	Singles
Silver medal – second place	2026 Haikou	Singles
Summer Youth Olympics
Silver medal – second place	2018 Buenos Aires	Singles
Silver medal – second place	2018 Buenos Aires	Mixed team
World Junior Championships
Gold medal – first place	2016 Cape Town	Singles
Gold medal – first place	2016 Cape Town	Team
Silver medal – second place	2016 Cape Town	Doubles
Asian Junior Championships
Gold medal – first place	2016 Bangkok	Team
Silver medal – second place	2016 Bangkok	Singles

Tomokazu Harimoto (張本 智和, Harimoto Tomokazu; born 27 June 2003) is a Japanese professional table tennis player. Born to Chinese parents, he became a naturalized Japanese citizen in 2014. He won the world junior singles and team title at the 2016 World Junior Table Tennis Championships for Japan.

In August 2017, he became the youngest ever winner of an ITTF World Tour men's singles title, winning the Czech Open title at the age of 14 years and 61 days. In December 2018, he became the youngest player to win the ITTF World Tour Grand Finals at the age of 15 years and 172 days.

== Personal life ==
Tomokazu Harimoto was born as Zhang Zhihe (Note: Chinese: 张智和; pinyin: Zhāng Zhìhé) in Sendai in Miyagi Prefecture, to Chinese descent. His father, Yu Harimoto (born Zhang Yu), (Note: Japanese: 張本 宇, romanized: Harimoto Yū. Born as Zhang Yu (Chinese: 张宇; pinyin: Zhāng Yǔ).) and mother, Rin Harimoto (born Zhang Ling) (Note: Japanese: 張本 凌, romanized: Harimoto Rin. Born as Zhang Ling (Chinese: 张凌; pinyin: Zhāng Líng)) are both former professional table tennis players from Sichuan, China. Rin Harimoto, at the peak of her career, represented the Chinese national team at the 1995 World Table Tennis Championships in Tianjin. They moved from China to Japan in 1998. He and his younger sister Miwa (born Zhang Meihe) were both taught to play table tennis by their parents from a young age with the intention of pursuing professional careers.

Harimoto began playing table tennis at the age of two. To compete in the All Japan Championships, he needed Japanese nationality. Consequently, his father and sister chose to become Japanese citizens as well. While in fourth grade, he was naturalized as a Japanese citizen in 2014 and legally changed his name from Zhang Zhihe to Tomokazu Harimoto. (Note: His old surname 張 is added kanji 本, become to 張本 and changed to Japanese reading as Harimoto. His given name in kanji 智和 is kept but changed reading from Mandarin as Zhihe to Japanese as Tomokazu.) His mother was later naturalized in 2021.

In April 2022, Harimoto announced he will be attending Waseda University School of Human Sciences after graduating from Nihon University Senior High School.

== Career ==
=== Junior career ===
Harimoto first won the All-Japan Table Tennis Championships Juniors title in 2010 as a first grader. He would continue to win the tournament for all 6 years of his elementary school years. In 2015, he was chosen to represent Japan at the World Junior Table Tennis Championships in France, becoming the youngest Japanese player to be chosen. However, due to the November 2015 Paris attacks, Harimoto was not able to participate in the tournament.

Aged 12 years and 355 days, Harimoto defeated seasoned professionals Ho Kwan Kit, Hugo Calderano, and teammate Kohei Sambe to win the 2016 U-21 Japan Open title. With the win, he became the youngest winner ITTF World Tour under-21 men's singles title. Later that year, Harimoto won gold medals in the boys' singles and teams events at the World Junior Table Tennis Championships in Cape Town, South Africa. This win was historic, as Harimoto became the youngest winner of the World Junior Championships aged 13 years and 163 days. Harimoto achieved an Under-21 ranking of No. 10 in the world in December 2016.

=== 2017 ===
Harimoto began the year in February at the recently revamped India Open. He reached the finals with victories over Álvaro Robles, Sakai Asuka, Robert Gardos, and local favorite Sharath Kamal, before losing to defending champion Dimitrij Ovtcharov in straight sets.

=== 2018 ===
In June 2018, Harimoto shocked the world by winning first place in the ITTF World Tour Japan Open, after beating Olympic champions Ma Long in the semifinal and Zhang Jike in the final. He was just short of 15 years old when he won the title. Later in the year, Harimoto continued to win the ITTF World Tour Grand Finals in Incheon, South Korea, where he defeated Lin Gaoyuan 4-1 in the final and became the youngest-ever winner of the event. His outstanding performance in 2018 also helped him reach No.3 in the ITTF world ranking, his career best.

=== 2020 ===
Harimoto won third place at the 2020 World Cup. Harimoto led 3–1 against Ma Long in the semi-finals, but lost 4–3 after Ma Long called time-out in the fifth game and switched to a high-toss serve that Harimoto had trouble reading.

=== 2021 ===
In March, Harimoto played in WTT Doha. He was upset in the semi-finals by Dimitrij Ovtcharov in the WTT Contender event, but won the champion for the WTT Star Contender event.

In June, teammate Jun Mizutani said that Harimoto's mental game was steadily improving in 2021 and better than the previous year. Mizutani also positively noted that Harimoto was reverting to his more aggressive style of play in 2021.

Harimoto was upset by Darko Jorgic in the round of 16 of the men's singles event at the Tokyo Olympics. Originally slated to be the ace player in the team event, Harimoto ended up playing in doubles in Japan's 3–1 victory against Sweden in the quarter-finals. In the semi-finals, Harimoto won both his matches as the ace player against Germany, but Germany still won 3–2.

== Records ==
- June 2016: Youngest ever winner of an ITTF World Tour under-21 men's singles title (12 years, 355 days).
- December 2016: Youngest ever winner of the boys' singles title at the World Junior Championships (13 years, 163 days).
- August 2017: Youngest ever winner of an ITTF World Tour men's singles title (14 years, 61 days).
- January 2018: Youngest ever winner of the men's singles title at the Japanese National Championships (14 years, 207 days).
- December 2018: Youngest ever winner of an ITTF World Tour Grand Finals men's singles title (15 years, 172 days).

== Awards ==
- ITTF Star Awards: Breakthrough Star (2017)

== Major tournament performance timeline ==
Key
W	F	SF	QF	#R

(W) won; (F) finalist; (SF) semi-finalist, rank added if bronze medal match played; (QF) quarter-finalist; (#R) rounds 4, 3, 2, 1;
(S) singles event; (MD) men's doubles event; (XD) mixed doubles event; (T) team event.

Tournament		2017	2018	2019	2020	2021	2022	2023	2024	2025	2026
World Championships	S	QF		4R		2R		QF		3R	
World Championships	MD			3R		3R		1R		3R	
World Championships	XD					F		F			
World Championships	T		QF				SF		QF		F
Olympic Games	S					4R			QF		
Olympic Games	XD								1R		
Olympic Games	T					SF3			SF4		
World Cup	S		QF	F	SF3				SF	QF	QF
World Cup	T		F	SF				3rd		F	
ITTF Finals / WTT Finals	S	QF	W	QF	1R	F	F	QF	F	W	
ITTF Finals / WTT Finals	MD	QF							QF		
Year-end ranking		2017	2018	2019	2020	2021	2022	2023	2024	2025	2026
Year-end ranking		17	5	5	5	5	2	11	3	4	

Senior career highlights, as of 10 August 2026

== ITTF/WTT career finals ==
=== Singles: 31 (18 titles, 13 runners-up) ===
Result	Year	Tournament	Opponent	Score	Ref
Runner-up	2017	ITTF World Tour, India Open	(Germany) Dimitrij Ovtcharov	0–4	
Winner	2017	ITTF World Tour, Czech Open	(Germany) Timo Boll	4–2	
Winner	2018	ITTF World Tour, Japan Open	(China) Zhang Jike	4–3	
Winner	2018	ITTF World Tour Grand Finals	(China) Lin Gaoyuan	4–1	
Runner-up	2019	ITTF World Tour, Hong Kong Open	(China) Lin Gaoyuan	2–4	
Winner	2019	ITTF World Tour, Bulgaria Open	(China) Zhao Zihao	4–2	
Runner-up	2019	World Cup	(China) Fan Zhendong	2–4	
Winner	2020	ITTF World Tour, Hungarian Open	(Japan) Yukiya Uda	4–1	
Winner	2021	WTT Star Contender Doha	(Germany) Ruwen Filus	4–2	
Runner-up	2021	WTT Cup Finals	(China) Fan Zhendong	1–4	
Winner	2022	WTT Champions European Summer Series	(China) Lin Gaoyuan	4–3	
Runner-up	2022	WTT Cup Finals	(China) Wang Chuqin	2–4	
Winner	2022	Asian Cup	(South Korea) Lim Jong-hoon	4–1	
Runner-up	2024	WTT Contender Doha	(Germany) Timo Boll	3–4	
Winner	2024	WTT Contender Tunis	(Japan) Yukiya Uda	4–3	
Winner	2024	WTT Star Contender Bangkok	(China) Lin Gaoyuan	4–0	
Winner	2024	Asian Championships	(China) Lin Shidong	3–1	
Runner-up	2024	WTT Champions Montpellier	(France) Félix Lebrun	1–4	
Runner-up	2024	WTT Finals	(China) Wang Chuqin	0–4	
Winner	2025	WTT Star Contender Doha	(Denmark) Jonathan Groth	4–0	
Runner-up	2025	WTT Contender Muscat	(China) Chen Yuanyu	2–4	
Winner	2025	WTT Contender Zagreb	(China) Chen Yuanyu	4–0	
Runner-up	2025	WTT United States Smash	(China) Wang Chuqin	0–4	
Winner	2025	WTT Champions Yokohama	(China) Wang Chuqin	4–2	
Runner-up	2025	WTT Star Contender London	(Germany) Dang Qiu	2–4	
Winner	2025	WTT Finals	(Sweden) Truls Möregårdh	4–2	
Runner-up	2026	Asian Cup	(China) Wang Chuqin	2–4	
Winner	2026	WTT Champions Yokohama	(South Korea) Oh Jun-sung	4–1	
Runner-up	2026	WTT Europe Smash – Sweden	(France) Félix Lebrun	1–4	
Winner	2026	Asian Championships	(China) Li Tianyang	3–2	
Winner	2026	WTT Champions Frankfurt	(Germany) Patrick Franziska	4–2	

=== Men's doubles: 8 (4 titles, 4 runners-up) ===
Result	Year	Tournament	Partner	Opponents	Score	Ref
Runner-up	2017	ITTF World Tour Platinum, China Open	Yuto Kizukuri	(Japan) Jin Ueda / Maharu Yoshimura	1–3	
Runner-up	2017	ITTF World Tour Platinum, German Open	Yuto Kizukuri	(South Korea) Jung Young-sik / Lee Sang-su	2–3	
Winner	2022	WTT Contender Tunis	Yuto Kizukuri	(China) Zhao Zihao / Xue Fei	3–2	
Winner	2024	WTT Contender Tunis	Sora Matsushima	(Chinese Taipei) Huang Yan-cheng / Feng Yi-hsin	3–0	
Winner	2024	WTT Star Contender Bangkok	Sora Matsushima	(Chinese Taipei) Kao Cheng-jui / Chuang Chih-yuan	3–2	
Runner-up	2025	WTT Star Contender Doha	Sora Matsushima	(China) Xiang Peng / Xu Yingbin	2–3	
Winner	2025	WTT Contender Muscat	Sora Matsushima	(Chinese Taipei) Hung Jing-kai / Chang Yu-an	3–0	
Runner-up	2025	WTT Star Contender Chennai	Sora Matsushima	(South Korea) Lim Jong-hoon / An Jae-hyun	1–3	

=== Mixed doubles: 15 (8 titles, 7 runners-up) ===
Result	Year	Tournament	Partner	Opponents	Score	Ref
Runner-up	2019	ITTF World Tour Platinum, Japan Open	Hina Hayata	(China) Xu Xin / Zhu Yuling	0–3	
Winner	2019	ITTF World Tour Platinum, Austrian Open	Hina Hayata	(China) Lin Gaoyuan / Zhu Yuling	3–1	
Runner-up	2021	World Championships	Hina Hayata	(China) Wang Chuqin / Sun Yingsha	0–3	
Winner	2022	WTT Contender Zagreb	Hina Hayata	(Hong Kong) Wong Chun Ting / Doo Hoi Kem	3–0	
Runner-up	2022	WTT Star Contender European Summer Series	Hina Hayata	(China) Wang Chuqin / Wang Manyu	2–3	
Winner	2022	WTT Contender Tunis	Miwa Harimoto	(Chinese Taipei) Feng Yi-hsin / Chen Szu-yu	3–2	
Runner-up	2023	Singapore Smash	Hina Hayata	(China) Wang Chuqin / Sun Yingsha	1–3	
Runner-up	2023	World Championships	Hina Hayata	(China) Wang Chuqin / Sun Yingsha	0–3	
Runner-up	2023	WTT Star Contender Lanzhou	Hina Hayata	(China) Lin Shidong / Kuai Man	2–3	
Winner	2023	WTT Contender Antalya	Hina Hayata	(France) Félix Lebrun / Prithika Pavade	3–1	
Runner-up	2024	WTT Contender Rio de Janeiro	Hina Hayata	(South Korea) Lim Jong-hoon / Shin Yu-bin	0–3	
Winner	2024	WTT Contender Zagreb	Hina Hayata	(South Korea) Lim Jong-hoon / Shin Yu-bin	3–2	
Winner	2024	WTT Star Contender Ljubljana	Hina Hayata	(South Korea) Lim Jong-hoon / Shin Yu-bin	3–2	
Winner	2024	WTT Contender Tunis	Hina Hayata	(Sweden) Kristian Karlsson / Christina Källberg	3–2	
Winner	2024	WTT Star Contender Bangkok	Hina Hayata	(Hong Kong) Wong Chun Ting / Doo Hoi Kem	3–1	

== Record against top-10 players ==
Harimoto's singles match record against those who had been ranked in the top 10 (as of 10 August 2026):

Player	Highest ranking	Record	Win%	Last match
(Belarus) Vladimir Samsonov	1	5–0	100%	Won (4–1) at 2019 ITTF World Tour Platinum German Open
(Germany) Timo Boll	1	2–3	40%	Lost (3–4) at 2024 WTT Contender Doha
(China) Ma Long	1	2–4	33%	Lost (3–4) at 2020 World Cup
(China) Zhang Jike	1	2–0	100%	Won (4–3) at 2018 ITTF World Tour Japan Open
(China) Xu Xin	1	0–8	0%	Lost (3–4) at 2019 ITTF World Tour Grand Finals
(Germany) Dimitrij Ovtcharov	1	7–5	58%	Lost (1–3) at 2025 WTT Champions Frankfurt
(China) Fan Zhendong	1	2–8	20%	Lost (3–4) at 2024 Summer Olympics
(China) Wang Chuqin	1	3–14	18%	Lost (2–4) at 2026 ITTF-ATTU Asian Cup
(China) Lin Shidong	1	6–2	75%	Won (4–3) at 2025 WTT Finals
(China) Lin Gaoyuan	2	5–4	56%	Won (3–1) at 2025 Asian Cup
(China) Liang Jingkun	2	3–8	27%	Lost (2–3) at 2026 World Team Championships
(Brazil) Hugo Calderano	2	4–2	67%	Lost (1–4) at 2025 World Cup
(Sweden) Truls Möregårdh	2	2–2	50%	Won (4–2) at 2025 WTT Finals
(Chinese Taipei) Chuang Chih-yuan	3	8–3	73%	Won (3–0) at 2024 Summer Olympics
(Japan) Jun Mizutani	4	3–0	100%	Won (4–1) at 2019 ITTF World Tour Hong Kong Open
(France) Félix Lebrun	4	3–6	33%	Lost (0–3) at 2026 World Team Championships
(Japan) Sora Matsushima	4	5–1	83%	Won (4–2) at 2026 WTT Champions Yokohama
(Japan) Koki Niwa	5	4–1	80%	Won (4–3) at 2019 World Cup
(Chinese Taipei) Lin Yun-ju	5	10–5	67%	Won (3–1) at 2026 World Team Championships
(Hong Kong) Wong Chun Ting	6	10–3	77%	Lost (1–3) at 2026 Asian Cup
(South Korea) Lee Sang-su	6	4–1	80%	Won (4–1) at 2022 Asian Cup
(Slovenia) Darko Jorgić	6	3–1	75%	Won (3–1) at 2023 WTT Champions Macao
(Portugal) Marcos Freitas	7	5–2	71%	Won (4–2) at 2024 World Cup
(South Korea) Jeoung Young-sik	7	3–1	75%	Won (3–0) at 2021 WTT Star Contender Doha
(Sweden) Mattias Falck	7	2–2	50%	Lost (1–3) at 2022 WTT Champions Macao
(France) Simon Gauzy	8	5–0	100%	Won (4–2) at 2025 WTT Finals
(Germany) Dang Qiu	8	3–3	50%	Won (3–0) at 2026 World Team Championships
(South Korea) Jang Woo-jin	8	6–5	55%	Won (3–0) at 2024 WTT Finals
(Germany) Patrick Franziska	8	9–1	90%	Lost (2–3) at 2026 WTT Singapore Smash
(France) Alexis Lebrun	8	3–2	60%	Won (4–0) at 2026 WTT Champions Yokohama
(Germany) Benedikt Duda	8	5–1	83%	Won (3–0) at 2026 World Team Championships
(China) Xiang Peng	8	4–1	80%	Won (3–0) at 2026 WTT Champions Yokohama
(Singapore) Gao Ning	9	1–0	100%	Won (3–0) at 2018 World Championships
(Japan) Kenta Matsudaira	9	0–1	0%	Lost (2–4) at 2018 ITTF World Tour Bulgarian Open
(Nigeria) Quadri Aruna	10	5–2	71%	Won (3–2) at 2025 WTT United States Smash
