= Miyu Nagasaki =

Japanese table tennis player

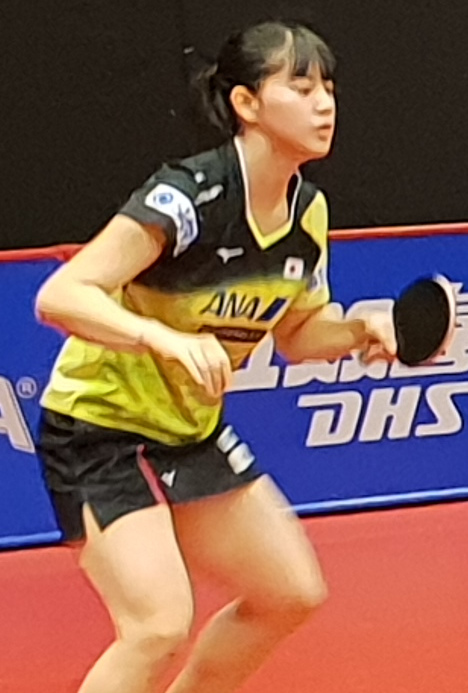
- Nagasaki at the 2018 Swedish Open

Personal information
- Born: 15 June 2002 (age 24) Ebina, Kanagawa, Japan
- Height: 164 cm (5 ft 5 in)

Sport
- Sport: Table tennis
- Club: Kinoshita Abyell Kanagawa (T.League)
- Playing style: Left-handed shakehand grip
- Highest ranking: 14 (5 August 2025)
- Current ranking: 18 (28 September 2026)
Medal record
Women's table tennis
Representing Japan
World Championships
Silver medal – second place	2018 Halmstad	Team
Silver medal – second place	2022 Chengdu	Team
Silver medal – second place	2026 London	Team
Bronze medal – third place	2023 Durban	Doubles
WTT Cup Finals
Silver medal – second place	2023 Nagoya	Doubles
Asian Games
Silver medal – second place	2022 Hangzhou	Team
Silver medal – second place	2026 Aichi-Nagoya	Team
Asian Championships
Gold medal – first place	2021 Doha	Team
Gold medal – first place	2026 Tashkent	Team
Silver medal – second place	2025 Bhubaneswar	Team
Bronze medal – third place	2021 Doha	Doubles
Bronze medal – third place	2023 Pyeongchang	Doubles
Bronze medal – third place	2023 Pyeongchang	Team
Bronze medal – third place	2026 Tashkent	Doubles

Miyu Nagasaki (長﨑 美柚, Nagasaki Miyū; born 15 June 2002) is a Japanese table tennis player.

== Career highlights ==
Nagasaki won national junior high school title and national U-14 title in 2016. She became a part of the Japanese women's team that won a silver medal at the 2018 World Team Table Tennis Championships in Halmstad, Sweden.

In September 2019, Nagasaki won both the girls' singles and doubles (with Miyuu Kihara) at the Asian Junior and Cadet Championships. Nagasaki continued to win both the girls' singles and doubles at the 2019 World Junior Championships. She was the first non-Chinese girl to win the singles in the tournament's 17-year history. Two weeks later, she and Kihara captured the women's doubles title at the 2019 ITTF World Tour Grand Finals.

== Teams ==
Nagasaki has played for teams in T.League since 2018:

- Kinoshita Abyell Kanagawa (2018–2021, 2022–)
- Nissay Red Elf (2021–2022)

== Finals ==
=== Women's singles ===
Result	Year	Tournament	Opponent	Score	Ref
Runner-up	2022	WTT Contender Lima	(Germany) Nina Mittelham	3–4	
Winner	2024	WTT Contender Rio de Janeiro	(Japan) Hina Hayata	4–3	
Winner	2025	WTT Star Contender Ljubljana	(Japan) Miyuu Kihara	4–1	

=== Women's doubles ===
Result	Year	Tournament	Partner	Opponents	Score	Ref
Runner-up	2018	ITTF Challenge, Slovenia Open	Miyuu Kihara	(Hong Kong) Ng Wing Nam / Minnie Soo	1–3	
Winner	2019	ITTF Challenge, Slovenia Open	Miyuu Kihara	(Japan) Satsuki Odo / Saki Shibata	3–0	
Winner	2019	ITTF Challenge, Croatia Open	Miyuu Kihara	(Japan) Honoka Hashimoto / Hitomi Sato	3–2	
Runner-up	2019	ITTF World Tour, German Open	Miyuu Kihara	(South Korea) Jeon Ji-hee / Yang Ha-eun	1–3	
Winner	2019	ITTF World Tour, Austrian Open	Miyuu Kihara	(Chinese Taipei) Chen Szu-yu / Cheng Hsien-tzu	3–2	
Winner	2019	ITTF World Tour Grand Finals	Miyuu Kihara	(South Korea) Jeon Ji-hee / Yang Ha-eun	3–0	
Winner	2021	WTT Star Contender Doha II	Minami Ando	(South Korea) Jeon Ji-hee / Yang Ha-eun	3–0	
Winner	2022	WTT Contender Doha	Miyuu Kihara	(Chinese Taipei) Chen Szu-yu / Huang Yi-hua	3–0	
Winner	2022	WTT Star Contender Doha	Miyuu Kihara	(Chinese Taipei) Li Yu-jhun / Cheng I-ching	3–0	
Winner	2023	WTT Star Contender Goa	Miwa Harimoto	(Chinese Taipei) Li Yu-jhun / Cheng I-ching	3–0	
Runner-up	2023	WTT Finals	Miyuu Kihara	(China) Wang Manyu / Sun Yingsha	1–3	
Winner	2024	WTT Contender Mendoza	Sakura Mori	(Chinese Taipei) Cheng Hsien-tzu / Chien Tung-chuan	3–0	
Winner	2024	WTT Star Contender Ljubljana	Miyuu Kihara	(South Korea) Jeon Ji-hee / Joo Cheon-hui	3–1	
Runner-up	2026	WTT Singapore Smash	Shin Yu-bin	(Japan) Miwa Harimoto / Hina Hayata	1–3	

=== Mixed doubles ===
Result	Year	Tournament	Partner	Opponents	Score	Ref
Winner	2024	WTT Contender Mendoza	Yuta Tanaka	(Sweden) Kristian Karlsson / Christina Källberg	3–2	
