= 2026 Asian Table Tennis Championships =

- Date: 19–25 October 2026
- Edition: 29th
- Location: Tashkent, Uzbekistan
- Venue: Olimpiya shaharchasi
- Asian Table Tennis Championships

The 2026 Asian Table Tennis Championships was a table tennis tournament held in Tashkent, Uzbekistan, from 19 to 25 October 2026. There were total of seven events in this edition.

== Medalists ==
| Event | Gold | Silver | Bronze |
|---|---|---|---|
| Men's singles | (Japan) Tomokazu Harimoto | (China) Li Tianyang | (Chinese Taipei) Kuo Guan-Hong |
| Men's singles | (Japan) Tomokazu Harimoto | (China) Li Tianyang | (China) Wen Ruibo |
| Women's singles | (China) Chen Yi | (Japan) Miwa Harimoto | (China) Kuai Man |
| Women's singles | (China) Chen Yi | (Japan) Miwa Harimoto | (China) Wang Yidi |
| Men's doubles | (China) Lin Shidong (China) Huang Youzheng | (China) Wen Ruibo (China) Yuan Licen | (Singapore) Koen Pang (Singapore) Izaac Quek |
| Men's doubles | (China) Lin Shidong (China) Huang Youzheng | (China) Wen Ruibo (China) Yuan Licen | (Hong Kong) Wong Chun Ting (Hong Kong) Chan Baldwin |
| Women's doubles | (China) Kuai Man (China) Wang Yidi | (Japan) Miwa Harimoto (Japan) Hina Hayata | (China) Chen Yi (China) Jiang Yiyi |
| Women's doubles | (China) Kuai Man (China) Wang Yidi | (Japan) Miwa Harimoto (Japan) Hina Hayata | (Japan) Satsuki Odo (Japan) Miyu Nagasaki |
| Mixed doubles | (Japan) Sora Matsushima (Japan) Miwa Harimoto | (China) Huang Youzheng (China) Chen Yi | (South Korea) Park Gyuhyeon (South Korea) Park Gahyeon |
| Mixed doubles | (Japan) Sora Matsushima (Japan) Miwa Harimoto | (China) Huang Youzheng (China) Chen Yi | (India) Harmeet Desai (India) Yashaswini Ghorpade |
| Men's team | (China) China; Lin Shidong; Zhou Qihao; Wen Ruibo; Xiang Peng; Huang Youzheng | (South Korea) Korea Republic; Park Ganghyeon; Park Gyuhyeon; Kang Dongsoo; Kim Minhyeok; Lim Yunoh | (Japan) Japan; Sora Matsushima; Tomokazu Harimoto; Hiroto Shinozuka; Yuta Tanaka |
| Men's team | (China) China; Lin Shidong; Zhou Qihao; Wen Ruibo; Xiang Peng; Huang Youzheng | (South Korea) Korea Republic; Park Ganghyeon; Park Gyuhyeon; Kang Dongsoo; Kim Minhyeok; Lim Yunoh | (Chinese Taipei) Chinese Taipei; Feng Yi-Hsin; Kuo Guan-Hong; Hung Jing-Kai; Hsu Hsien-Chia; Tsai Tien-Yu |
| Women's team | (Japan) Japan; Miwa Harimoto; Hina Hayata; Satsuki Odo; Honoka Hashimoto; Miyu Nagasaki | (China) China; Wang Yidi; Kuai Man; Chen Yi; Shi Xunyao; Xu Yi | (Chinese Taipei) Chinese Taipei; Peng Yu-Han; Yeh Yi-Tian; Chien Tung-Chuan; Wu Ying Syuan; Chen Szu-Yu |
| Women's team | (Japan) Japan; Miwa Harimoto; Hina Hayata; Satsuki Odo; Honoka Hashimoto; Miyu Nagasaki | (China) China; Wang Yidi; Kuai Man; Chen Yi; Shi Xunyao; Xu Yi | (South Korea) Korea Republic; Lee Eunhye; Park Gahyeon; Lee Daeun; Yoo Siwoo; Lee Zion |

== Medal table ==
| Rank | Nation | Gold | Silver | Bronze | Total |
|---|---|---|---|---|---|
| 1 | China | 4 | 4 | 4 | 12 |
| 2 | Japan | 3 | 2 | 2 | 7 |
| 3 | South Korea | 0 | 1 | 2 | 3 |
| 4 | Chinese Taipei | 0 | 0 | 3 | 3 |
| 5 | Hong Kong | 0 | 0 | 1 | 1 |
| 5 | India | 0 | 0 | 1 | 1 |
| 5 | Singapore | 0 | 0 | 1 | 1 |
| Totals (7 entries) | | 7 | 7 | 14 | 28 |
