= 2027 World Table Tennis Championships =

2027 edition of the World Table Tennis Championships

- Venue: Barys Arena
- Location: Astana, Kazakhstan
- Dates: 22–30 May

The 2027 World Table Tennis Championships will be the 59th edition of World Table Tennis Championships and held in Astana, Kazakhstan.

== Medal summary ==
=== Medalists ===
Event	Gold	Silver	Bronze
Men's singles			
Women's singles			
Men's doubles			
Women's doubles			
Mixed doubles			
