= Hina Hayata =

Japanese table tennis player (born 2000)

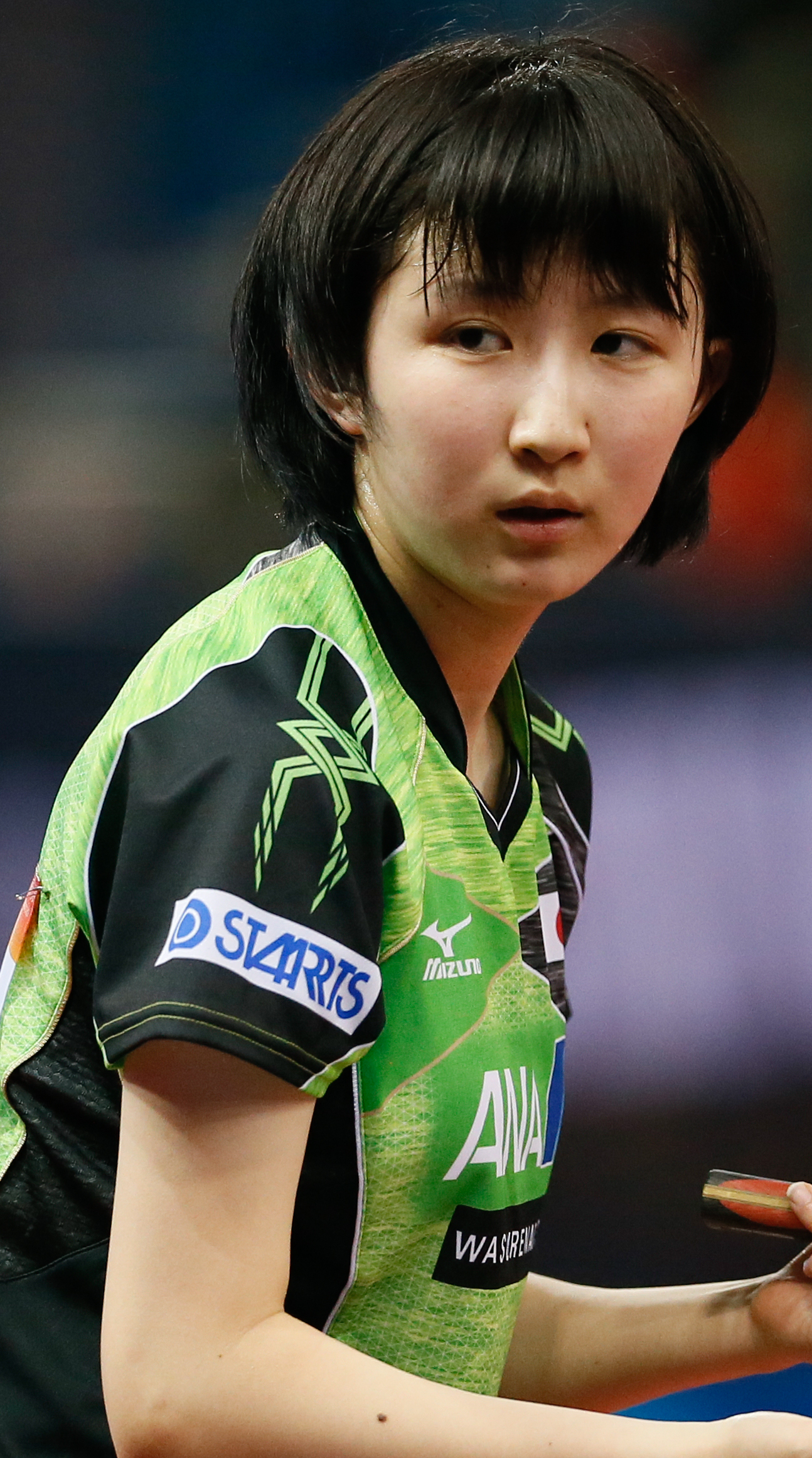
- Hayata at the 2017 German Open

Personal information
- Born: 7 July 2000 (age 26) Kitakyushu, Fukuoka, Japan
- Height: 1.67 m (5 ft 6 in)

Sport
- Sport: Table tennis
- Club: Nippon Life Redelf (T.League)
- Playing style: Dual winged left-handed attacker
- Highest ranking: 4 (31 October 2023)
- Current ranking: 6 (28 September 2026)
Medal record
Women's table tennis
Representing Japan
Olympic Games
Silver medal – second place	2024 Paris	Team
Bronze medal – third place	2024 Paris	Singles
World Championships
Silver medal – second place	2018 Halmstad	Team
Silver medal – second place	2019 Budapest	Doubles
Silver medal – second place	2021 Houston	Doubles
Silver medal – second place	2021 Houston	Mixed doubles
Silver medal – second place	2022 Chengdu	Team
Silver medal – second place	2023 Durban	Mixed doubles
Silver medal – second place	2024 Busan	Team
Silver medal – second place	2026 London	Team
Bronze medal – third place	2017 Düsseldorf	Doubles
Bronze medal – third place	2023 Durban	Singles
World Cup
Silver medal – second place	2018 London	Team
Silver medal – second place	2025 Chengdu	Mixed team
Bronze medal – third place	2023 Chengdu	Mixed team
Asian Games
Silver medal – second place	2022 Hangzhou	Singles
Silver medal – second place	2022 Hangzhou	Team
Silver medal – second place	2026 Aichi-Nagoya	Doubles
Silver medal – second place	2026 Aichi-Nagoya	Team
Bronze medal – third place	2026 Aichi-Nagoya	Singles
Asian Championships
Gold medal – first place	2021 Doha	Singles
Gold medal – first place	2021 Doha	Mixed doubles
Gold medal – first place	2021 Doha	Team
Gold medal – first place	2024 Astana	Team
Gold medal – first place	2026 Tashkent	Team
Silver medal – second place	2017 Wuxi	Team
Silver medal – second place	2025 Bhubaneswar	Team
Silver medal – second place	2026 Tashkent	Doubles
Bronze medal – third place	2017 Wuxi	Doubles
Bronze medal – third place	2023 Pyeongchang	Team

Hina Hayata (早田 ひな, Hayata Hina; born 7 July 2000) is a Japanese international table tennis player. She is the most successful player on the ITTF Challenge Series since its inception in 2017. Owing to her stature, she is able to generate more spin on both sides than most female players. She is coached by Daisuka Ishida.

== Career ==
=== Junior ===
Hayata was a member of Japanese girls' team winning gold at the 2016 World Junior Table Tennis Championships. She also won silver in girls' doubles and mixed doubles.

She won the bronze medal in women's doubles at the 2017 World Table Tennis Championships with Mima Ito. She won several doubles titles in the ITTF World Tour, including the Grand Finals in 2016 and 2018.

=== 2019–2020 ===
In the ITTF Portugal Open 2019, she caused a major upset by beating 4-time Women's World Cup Champion Liu Shiwen 4–3. She went on to beat another Chinese player Hu Limei before winning the tournament by defeating her compatriot Honoka Hashimoto in the finals.

In January 2020, she won the All Japan Table Tennis Championships for the first time, shocking reigning champion Mima Ito in the semi-finals and then defeating Kasumi Ishikawa in the finals.

=== 2021 ===
Hayata lost to Mima Ito 4–3 in the 2021 All Japan Table Tennis Championships in the semi-finals. At the WTT Contender Doha, she upset Kasumi Ishikawa and advanced to the finals to once again face Mima Ito. Hayata lost to Ito 4–2 in the finals. In the WTT Star Contender Doha event later the same year, Hayata won the women's singles title and the mixed doubles title.

In the 2020 Summer Olympics held in Tokyo, which was postponed to 2021 due to the global pandemic, Hina Hayata had her first participation at the Olympics, although as reserve player of the Japanese women's team. The team secured the silver medal at this event.

At the ITTF World Table Tennis Championships 2021 held in Houston, Hayata joined all three competitions at the first time. In women's singles, Hayata was eliminated in the round of last 16 by Wang Yidi of China by 4:2. Together with Mima Ito, Hayata won silver medals in women's doubles after beating Qian Tianyi/Chen Meng 3:2 in the semi-finals and losing to Sun Yingsha/Wang Manyu 3:0 in the finals. She was also successful in mixed doubles, winning silver medals together with Tomokazu Harimoto.

=== 2022 ===
In November 2022, Hayata reached the semifinals of the ATTU Cup, losing to Wang Yidi by 4:1. In the bronze medal match, she lost to Manika Batra of India in six games.

=== 2023 ===
In January 2023, Hayata secured the triple crown at the All Japan Table Tennis Championships by winning the women's singles, women's doubles (with Mima Ito) and mixed doubles (with Tomokazu Harimoto) competitions. This made her the fourth woman to win all three titles in the history of this national tournament, following Mima Ito's success from 2019.

In the 2023 ITTF World Table Tennis Championships Finals in Durban, Hayata played the women's singles, women's doubles and mixed doubles competitions. In mixed doubles, the pairing Hina Hayata/Tomokazu Harimoto reached the finals after winning the semi-finals 3:1 against Kuai Man/Lin Shidong of China. In the finals they lost 3:0 to the Chinese pairing Sun Yingsha/Wang Chuqin, thus earning a silver medal. In women's singles Hayata reached the semi-finals after winning a thrilling quarterfinal encounter with 4:3 against Wang Yidi, in which she saved nine match points and won game seven by 21:19. In the following semi-finals, she lost 4:1 to World number 1 Sun Yingsha. This was the second women's singles medal for Japan at a WTTC since 1969, successing the bronze medal of compatriot Hirano Miu in 2017. In women's doubles, Hina Hayata and Mima Ito reached the quarterfinals, where they lost to Chen Meng/Wang Yidi with 3:0.

In August, Hayata participated at the WTT Contender Rio de Janeiro, where she won the women's single title by beating Linda Bergstrom of Sweden in the finals by 4:1.

At the 2022 Asian Games held in September 2023 in Hangzhou, Hayata led the Japanese women team to win the silver medal. She finished second place after being victorious against Wang Yidi the second time this year, winning 12-10 in the seventh set. In the final, Hayata lost to reigning World Champion and World No.1 Sun Yingsha.

In October 2023, she won the Women's Single title at the WTT Contender Muscat, beating Adriana Diaz 4:0 in the finals.

In August 2024, she won the bronze medal for the Table Tennis Women's Singles event of the 2024 Olympics in Paris and as part of the Women's Team for Japan won the silver medal for that event, though she and partner Harimoto lost to Ri Jong Sik and Kim Kum Yong of North Korea, the last seeded pair and eventual silver medalists, in the first round of the Mixed Doubles event in an upset defeat.

== Controversy ==
On 13 August 2024, in an interview upon her return to Japan from the 2024 Summer Olympics, Hayata expressed her desire to visit the Chiran Peace Museum for Kamikaze Pilots. Her remarks sparked heated discussions and criticism in China and South Korea, where many believed she was affirming Japanese militarism against China and Korea during World War II. The day after her comments, Sun Yingsha and Chinese table tennis player Fan Zhendong unfollowed Hayata on the Chinese social media platform Weibo, while the official Weibo account of the People's Liberation Army posted a message stating that "promoting this so-called 'Peace Hall' will do no good to Japan's future" and "we must be vigilant against the lingering ghost of militarism and prevent the tragedy of history from repeating itself." Two days after her remarks, China's national television broadcaster, China Central Television (CCTV), removed videos of Hayata's matches in the Olympics from its online platform.

== Singles titles ==
Year	Tournament	Final opponent	Score	Ref
2016	ITTF World Tour, Australia Open	(Japan) Yuka Ishigaki	4–1	
2017	ITTF Challenge, Spanish Open	(South Korea) Jeon Ji-hee	4–3	
2019	ITTF Challenge Plus, Portugal Open	(Japan) Honoka Hashimoto	4–3	
2019	ITTF Challenge Plus, Oman Open	(Chinese Taipei) Cheng I-ching	4–1	
2019	ITTF Challenge, Serbia Open	(Hong Kong) Minnie Soo	4–1	
2019	ITTF Challenge Plus, Paraguay Open	(Japan) Honoka Hashimoto	4–2	
2019	ITTF Challenge, Belarus Open	(China) Fan Siqi	4–2	
2021	WTT Star Contender Doha	(Hong Kong) Doo Hoi Kem	4–1	
2021	Asian Championships	(South Korea) Shin Yu-bin	3–1	
2022	WTT Contender Almaty	(Portugal) Fu Yu	4–1	
2023	WTT Contender Rio de Janeiro	(Sweden) Linda Bergström	4–1	
2023	WTT Contender Muscat	(Puerto Rico) Adriana Diaz	4–0	
2023	WTT Contender Antalya	(Germany) Han Ying	4–0	
2024	WTT Contender Zagreb	(Japan) Miwa Harimoto	4–0	
2024	WTT Star Contender Ljubljana	(France) Prithika Pavade	4–0	
2025	WTT Champions Frankfurt	(Japan) Miwa Harimoto	4–3	
2026	WTT Star Contender Ljubljana	(Macau) Zhu Yuling	4–3	
2026	WTT Star Contender São José dos Campos	(Japan) Hitomi Sato	4–2	
2026	WTT Champions Frankfurt	(Japan) Satsuki Odo	4–2	
