= 2024 ITTF Men's World Cup =

Table tennis tournament in Macau, China

- Location: Macau, China
- Date: 15-21 April 2024
- Competitors: 48

Medalists
gold medal	(China) Ma Long
silver medal	(China) Lin Gaoyuan
bronze medal	(Japan) Tomokazu Harimoto
bronze medal	(China) Wang Chuqin

The 2024 ITTF Men's World Cup was a table tennis competition held in Macau, China, from 15 to 21 April 2024. It was the 42nd edition of the ITTF-sanctioned event.

The two-time former champion Ma Long defeated Lin Gaoyuan, 9-11, 9-11, 5-11, 11-8, 11-6, 11-4, 11-8 to win the men's singles title at the 2024 ITTF World Cup. By doing so, Ma Long became the oldest player ever to win a major title in the men's singles discipline, at 35 years and 184 days of age.

== Competition format ==
The tournament consisted of two stages: a preliminary group stage and a knockout stage. The players were drawn into 16 groups. The top player from each group progresses through to the second stage of the competition, which consisted of a knockout draw.

== Seeding ==
The seeding list was based on the official World Table Tennis world ranking for 09 April 2024.

1. (China) Wang Chuqin (semi-finals, bronze medalist)
2. (China) Fan Zhendong (quarter-finals)
3. (China) Liang Jingkun (first round)
4. (China) Ma Long (champion, gold medalist)
5. (France) Felix Lebrun (first round)
6. (Chinese Taipei) Lin Yun-ju (first round)
7. (Brazil) Hugo Calderano (first round)
8. (China) Lin Gaoyuan (final, silver medalist)
9. (Japan) Tomokazu Harimoto (semi-finals, bronze medalist)
10. (Germany) Dang Qiu (group stage)
11. (South Korea) Jang Woo-jin (quarter-finals)
12. (Slovenia) Darko Jorgic (first round)
13. (China) Lin Shidong (first round)
14. (Sweden) Anton Kallberg (quarter-finals)
15. (Egypt) Omar Assar (first round)
16. (Portugal) Marcos Freitas (first round)

== Group stage ==
The preliminary group stage took place from 15-17 April, with the top player in each group progressing to the main draw.

== Main draw ==
The knockout stage took place from 18-21 April.

First round
1	(China) Wang Chuqin	9	11	7	11	11	13
(Brazil) Hugo Calderano	11	9	11	4	8	11
(South Korea) Jang Woo-jin	11	5	14	11	11	11
(Chinese Taipei) Lin Yun-ju	13	11	12	5	6	5
(Japan) Shunsuke Togami	11	12	11	10	11	11
(Egypt) Omar Assar	7	14	8	12	5	3
(France) Felix Lebrun	7	8	11	8	11	8
4	(China) Ma Long	11	11	7	11	8	11
3	(China) Liang Jingkun	11	8	5	6	11	11	6
(Sweden) Anton Kallberg	3	11	11	11	8	9	11
(Portugal) Marcos Freitas	6	7	11	11	7	6
(Japan) Tomokazu Harimoto	11	11	9	9	11	11
(Slovenia) Darko Jorgic	7	8	9	11	11	8
(China) Lin Gaoyuan	11	11	11	7	4	11
(China) Lin Shidong	11	9	12	11	9	11	13
2	(China) Fan Zhendong	7	11	10	6	11	13	15

Quarterfinals
1	(China) Wang Chuqin	11	11	11	9	11
(South Korea) Jang Woo-jin	6	4	2	11	5
(Japan) Shunsuke Togami	11	5	11	7	3	3
4	(China) Ma Long	5	11	7	11	11	11
(Sweden) Anton Kallberg	11	7	11	9	9	4
(Japan) Tomokazu Harimoto	9	11	9	11	11	11
(China) Lin Gaoyuan	11	6	11	6	12	11
2	(China) Fan Zhendong	7	11	7	11	10	7

Semifinals
1	(China) Wang Chuqin	9	10	6	12
4	(China) Ma Long	11	12	11	14
(Japan) Tomokazu Harimoto	9	6	6	1
(China) Lin Gaoyuan	11	11	11	11

Final
4	(China) Ma Long	9	9	5	11	11	11	11
(China) Lin Gaoyuan	11	11	11	8	6	4	8

== See also ==
- 2020 ITTF Men's World Cup
- 2023 World Table Tennis Championships
- 2024 World Team Table Tennis Championships
- 2024 Paris Olympics

Preceded by 2020 ITTF Men's World Cup	ITTF World Cup	Succeeded by 2025 ITTF Men's World Cup
