= China Smash 2026 – Qualification =

Table tennis tournament qualification

The China Smash 2026 – Qualification was a series of table tennis matches that took place from 1 to 3 October 2026 to determine the eight qualifiers for the tournament's main draw.

The qualification tournament was contested in two singles events: men's singles and women's singles.

A total of 64 players competed in each event in a knockout format, with only eight players from each event securing a place in the main draw.

== Qualifiers ==
=== Men's singles qualifiers ===
The following players qualified for the main draw:

- (Slovakia) Ľubomír Pištej
- (Germany) André Bertelsmeier
- (Belgium) Cédric Nuytinck
- (China) Yuan Licen
- (Germany) Wim Verdonschot
- (Slovakia) Yang Wang
- (China) Xu Yingbin
- (Romania) Darius Movileanu

The following players qualified as lucky losers after replacing players who withdrew from the main draw:

- (Romania) Iulian Chirita
- (Hong Kong) Baldwin Chan

=== Women's singles qualifiers ===
The following players qualified for the main draw:

- (China) Fan Shuhan
- (China) Zhu Sibing
- (Thailand) Orawan Paranang
- (China) Wang Xiaotong
- (China) Liu Ziling
- (Hong Kong) Su Tsz Tung
- (China) Zong Geman
- (Germany) Xiaona Shan

== Men's singles ==
=== Seeds ===
1. (Romania) Eduard Ionescu (first round)
2. (France) Joe Seyfried (second round)
3. (Belgium) Cédric Nuytinck (qualified)
4. (Japan) Ryoichi Yoshiyama (first round)
5. (Germany) André Bertelsmeier (qualified)
6. (Germany) Wim Verdonschot (qualified)
7. (Croatia) Andrej Gaćina (first round)
8. (India) Ankur Bhattacharjee (first round)
9. (Algeria) Mehdi Bouloussa (second round)
10. (Egypt) Youssef Abdelaziz (second round)
11. (China) Li Tianyang (qualifying competition)
12. (Portugal) Marcos Freitas (second round)
13. (Slovenia) Deni Kožul (qualifying competition)
14. (Romania) Iulian Chirita (qualified as lucky losers)
15. (England) Liam Pitchford (qualifying competition)
16. (Hong Kong) Baldwin Chan (qualified as lucky losers)

=== First qualifier ===
First round
1	(Romania) Eduard Ionescu	4	6	12	11	8
WC	(Iran) Benyamin Faraji	11	11	10	9	11
(Mexico) Rogelio Castro	7	5	11
(Slovakia) Ľubomír Pištej	11	11	13
(Austria) Andreas Levenko	11	11	6	11	8
(Croatia) Ivor Ban	4	13	11	6	11
(Poland) Marek Badowski	11	7	9	8
13	(Slovenia) Deni Kožul	5	11	11	11

Second round
WC	(Iran) Benyamin Faraji	7	10	11	9
(Slovakia) Ľubomír Pištej	11	12	5	11
(Croatia) Ivor Ban	11	13	11	7	9
13	(Slovenia) Deni Kožul	8	15	5	11	11

Qualifying competition
(Slovakia) Ľubomír Pištej	14	8	11	11
13	(Slovenia) Deni Kožul	12	11	8	8

=== Second qualifier ===
First round
11/WC	(China) Li Tianyang	11	11	11
(Nigeria) Quadri Aruna	9	4	9
WC	(China) Niu Guankai	11	11	11
(India) Payas Jain	3	8	9
(Chinese Taipei) Chang Yu-an	12	11	10	11
(Italy) John Oyebode	10	6	12	4
(Belgium) Martin Allegro	2	2	11	4
5	(Germany) André Bertelsmeier	11	11	8	11

Second round
11/WC	(China) Li Tianyang	11	6	11	11
WC	(China) Niu Guankai	6	11	7	7
(Chinese Taipei) Chang Yu-an	11	16	12	8	5
5	(Germany) André Bertelsmeier	9	14	14	11	11

Qualifying competition
11/WC	(China) Li Tianyang	6	10	11	11	8
5	(Germany) André Bertelsmeier	11	12	8	5	11

=== Third qualifier ===
First round
3	(Belgium) Cédric Nuytinck	3	11	11	8	13
(Italy) Niagol Stoyanov	11	6	4	11	11
(Russia) Nikita Artemenko	11	11	5	11
WC	(China) Li Hechen	7	4	11	7
(Canada) Eugene Wang	9	13	8	8
(Poland) Maciej Kubik	11	11	11	11
(Canada) Edward Ly	4	7	11	9
15	(England) Liam Pitchford	11	11	5	11

Second round
3	(Belgium) Cédric Nuytinck	7	11	11	11
(Russia) Nikita Artemenko	11	7	8	6
(Poland) Maciej Kubik	5	3	8
15	(England) Liam Pitchford	11	11	11

Qualifying competition
3	(Belgium) Cédric Nuytinck	11	11	3	8	11
15	(England) Liam Pitchford	9	5	11	11	4

=== Fourth qualifier ===
First round
9	(Algeria) Mehdi Bouloussa	11	6	11	11
(Brazil) Leonardo Iizuka	9	11	5	6
(Singapore) Koen Pang	9	7	0
(Chile) Gustavo Gomez	11	11	11
WC	(China) Yuan Licen	9	12	11	11
(Benin) Abdel-Kader Salifou	11	10	3	7
(Serbia) Dimitrije Levajac	w	/	o
8	(India) Ankur Bhattacharjee

Second round
9	(Algeria) Mehdi Bouloussa	8	11	11	11	8
(Chile) Gustavo Gomez	11	9	9	13	11
WC	(China) Yuan Licen	11	11	9	11
(Serbia) Dimitrije Levajac	7	3	11	3

Qualifying competition
(Chile) Gustavo Gomez	11	5	6	11	5
WC	(China) Yuan Licen	7	11	11	8	11

=== Fifth qualifier ===
First round
6	(Germany) Wim Verdonschot	11	11	11
(Moldova) Vladislav Ursu	7	9	7
(India) Harmeet Desai	11	6	11	11
(Chile) Nicolás Burgos	7	11	8	9
(Portugal) Tiago Apolónia	8	5	11	6
(Italy) Matteo Mutti	11	11	2	11
(New Zealand) Timothy Choi	3	8	7
12	(Portugal) Marcos Freitas	11	11	11

Second round
6	(Germany) Wim Verdonschot	6	13	11	11
(India) Harmeet Desai	11	11	5	9
(Italy) Matteo Mutti	13	11	11	9	13
12	(Portugal) Marcos Freitas	15	8	6	11	11

Qualifying competition
6	(Germany) Wim Verdonschot	11	12	11
(Italy) Matteo Mutti	5	10	9

=== Sixth qualifier ===
First round
14	(Romania) Iulian Chirita	11	11	11
(Cameroon) Ylane Batix	7	3	6
(New Zealand) Dean Shu	8	9	7
WC	(China) Zhou Guanhong	11	11	11
(Romania) Ovidiu Ionescu	11	11	2	8	10
(Slovakia) Yang Wang	3	4	11	11	12
(Australia) Aditya Sareen	12	11	11
4	(Japan) Ryoichi Yoshiyama	10	9	5

Second round
14	(Romania) Iulian Chirita	11	7	11	11
WC	(China) Zhou Guanhong	5	11	3	9
(Slovakia) Yang Wang	6	10	11	12	11
(Australia) Aditya Sareen	11	12	4	10	8

Qualifying competition
14	(Romania) Iulian Chirita	7	6	8
(Slovakia) Yang Wang	11	11	11

=== Seventh qualifier ===
First round
7	(Croatia) Andrej Gaćina	13	11	7	9
(Chinese Taipei) Hung Che-yen	15	5	11	11
(Luxembourg) Luka Mladenovic	8	10	11	5
(Croatia) Filip Zeljko	11	12	9	11
(Hong Kong) Lam Siu Hang	3	6	10
WC	(China) Xu Yingbin	11	11	12
(England) Connor Green	12	9	7	11	6
10	(Egypt) Youssef Abdelaziz	10	11	11	8	11

Second round
(Chinese Taipei) Hung Che-yen	7	11	11	11	11
(Croatia) Filip Zeljko	11	13	8	6	8
WC	(China) Xu Yingbin	14	11	11
10	(Egypt) Youssef Abdelaziz	12	3	4

Qualifying competition
(Chinese Taipei) Hung Che-yen	8	7	12	5
WC	(China) Xu Yingbin	11	11	10	11

=== Eighth qualifier ===
First round
16	(Hong Kong) Baldwin Chan	11	11	12	11
(Kazakhstan) Alan Kurmangaliyev	4	4	14	8
(Chinese Taipei) Hung Jing-kai	13	11	11
(South Korea) Park gyu-hyeon	11	4	3
(Romania) Darius Movileanu	6	11	2	11	11
(South Korea) Kwon Hyuk	11	8	11	4	8
(India) Snehit Suravajjula	6	8	11	5
2	(France) Joe Seyfried	11	11	8	11

Second round
16	(Hong Kong) Baldwin Chan	11	11	11
(Chinese Taipei) Hung Jing-kai	5	1	9
(Romania) Darius Movileanu	10	11	11	8	11
2	(France) Joe Seyfried	12	8	9	11	6

Qualifying competition
16	(Hong Kong) Baldwin Chan	11	9	8	9
(Romania) Darius Movileanu	8	11	11	11

== Women's singles ==
=== Seeds ===
1. (Australia) Constantina Psihogios (first round)
2. (Germany) Xiaona Shan (qualified)
3. (Hong Kong) Su Tsz Tung (qualified)
4. (India) Diya Chitale (second round)
5. (United States) Sally Moyland (second round)
6. (Monaco) Xiaoxin Yang (second round)
7. (South Korea) Kim Seong-jin (first round)
8. (Portugal) Jieni Shao (first round)
9. (Romania) Elena Zaharia (second round)
10. (Italy) Giorgia Piccolin (first round)
11. (India) Yashaswini Ghorpade (second round)
12. (South Korea) Yoo Ye-rin (first round)
13. (Sweden) Christina Källberg (first round)
14. (England) Tin-Tin Ho (second round)
15. (Hong Kong) Ng Wing Lam (second round)
16. (Luxembourg) Sarah de Nutte (first round)

=== First qualifier ===
First round
1	(Australia) Constantina Psihogios	6	7	11	13	5
(France) Claire Picard	11	11	8	11	11
WC	(China) Han Feier	12	6	11	11
WC	(China) Yang Yiyun	10	11	8	3
(Germany) Yuan Wan	6	10	9
WC	(China) Fan Shuhan	11	12	11
(Singapore) Tan Zhao Yun	11	9	7	7
15	(Hong Kong) Ng Wing Lam	9	11	11	11

Second round
(France) Claire Picard	14	11	2	8
WC	(China) Han Feier	16	9	11	11
WC	(China) Fan Shuhan	11	11	11
15	(Hong Kong) Ng Wing Lam	6	5	7

Qualifying competition
WC	(China) Han Feier	12	8	11	9
WC	(China) Fan Shuhan	14	11	6	11

=== Second qualifier ===
First round
11	(India) Yashaswini Ghorpade	11	5	11	8	12
(India) Nithya Mani	5	11	6	11	10
(Ukraine) Veronika Matiunina	3	1	4
WC	(China) Zhu Sibing	11	11	11
(Malaysia) Chang Li Sian	6	11	8	7
(India) Syndrela Das	11	8	11	11
(Hong Kong) Lam Yee Lok	11	7	11	3	11
8	(Portugal) Jieni Shao	8	11	8	11	6

Second round
11	(India) Yashaswini Ghorpade	5	7	6
WC	(China) Zhu Sibing	11	11	11
(India) Syndrela Das	6	11	13	9	7
(Hong Kong) Lam Yee Lok	11	5	11	11	11

Qualifying competition
WC	(China) Zhu Sibing	11	11	11
(Hong Kong) Lam Yee Lok	5	9	4

=== Third qualifier ===
First round
4	(India) Diya Chitale	11	9	14	12
(Brazil) Giulia Takahashi	8	11	12	10
(Hong Kong) Zhu Chengzhu	11	9	11	11
(France) Isa Cok	9	11	7	4
(Singapore) Loy Ming Ying	11	7	11	11	11
(Croatia) Ivana Malobabić	13	11	4	5	3
(Thailand) Orawan Paranang	9	12	11	11
16	(Luxembourg) Sarah de Nutte	11	10	5	6

Second round
4	(India) Diya Chitale	5	14	11	11	11
(Hong Kong) Zhu Chengzhu	11	16	5	8	13
(Singapore) Loy Ming Ying	9	9	11	7
(Thailand) Orawan Paranang	11	11	7	11

Qualifying competition
(Hong Kong) Zhu Chengzhu	7	9	11	7
(Thailand) Orawan Paranang	11	11	2	11

=== Fourth qualifier ===
First round
10	(Italy) Giorgia Piccolin	5	9	4
WC	(China) Wang Xiaotong	11	11	11
(Italy) Gaia Monfardini	5	2	12	9
(France) Camille Lutz	11	11	10	11
(Slovakia) Tatiana Kukuľková
(Italy) Nicole Arlia	w	/	o
(Romania) Adina Diaconu	11	11	11
7	(South Korea) Kim Seong-jin	7	6	8

Second round
WC	(China) Wang Xiaotong	12	17	11
(France) Camille Lutz	10	15	5
(Italy) Nicole Arlia	6	11	9	12	4
(Romania) Adina Diaconu	11	7	11	10	11

Qualifying competition
WC	(China) Wang Xiaotong	12	13	11
(Romania) Adina Diaconu	10	11	6

=== Fifth qualifier ===
First round
5	(United States) Sally Moyland	11	11	11
(Luxembourg) Xia Lian Ni	5	4	7
(Kazakhstan) Zauresh Akasheva	11	11	6	3	11
(Egypt) Mariam Alhodaby	7	9	11	11	8
WC	(China) Liu Ziling	11	15	14
(Netherlands) Jie Li	7	13	12
(New Zealand) Jocelyn Lam	9	3	10
9	(Romania) Elena Zaharia	11	11	12

Second round
5	(United States) Sally Moyland	11	14	11	8	11
(Kazakhstan) Zauresh Akasheva	4	16	6	11	13
WC	(China) Liu Ziling	11	12	3	11
9	(Romania) Elena Zaharia	5	10	11	4

Qualifying competition
(Kazakhstan) Zauresh Akasheva	10	13	4
WC	(China) Liu Ziling	12	15	11

=== Sixth qualifier ===
First round
13	(Sweden) Christina Källberg	9	11	8	5
(Spain) Sofia-Xuan Zhang	11	9	11	11
(Poland) Katarzyna Węgrzyn	12	11	11
(Poland) Zuzanna Wielgos	10	9	6
(Malaysia) Tee Ai Xin	11	11	11
(Puerto Rico) Brianna Burgos	9	7	6
(Switzerland) Rachel Moret	5	11	9	11
3	(Hong Kong) Su Tsz Tung	11	8	11	13

Second round
(Spain) Sofia-Xuan Zhang	7	11	11	2	7
(Poland) Katarzyna Węgrzyn	11	7	9	11	11
(Malaysia) Tee Ai Xin	5	3	4
3	(Hong Kong) Su Tsz Tung	11	11	11

Qualifying competition
(Poland) Katarzyna Węgrzyn	7	6	8
3	(Hong Kong) Su Tsz Tung	11	11	11

=== Seventh qualifier ===
First round
6	(Monaco) Xiaoxin Yang	5	6	12	11	11
(Sweden) Filippa Bergand	11	11	10	6	8
(Portugal) Fu Yu	11	11	4	13
(Chile) Daniela Ortega	6	8	11	11
(India) Divyanshi Bhowmick	11	11	8	11
(Turkey) Sibel Altınkaya	3	5	11	5
WC	(China) Zong Geman	11	7	11	10	15
12	(South Korea) Yoo Ye-rin	9	11	9	12	13

Second round
6	(Monaco) Xiaoxin Yang	11	6	6	7
(Portugal) Fu Yu	5	11	11	11
(India) Divyanshi Bhowmick	8	4	6
WC	(China) Zong Geman	11	11	11

Qualifying competition
(Portugal) Fu Yu	5	8	10
WC	(China) Zong Geman	11	11	12

=== Eighth qualifier ===
First round
14	(England) Tin-Tin Ho	11	11	11
(Chile) Paulina Vega	5	3	9
(United States) Jessica Reyes Lai	4	5	12	7
(France) Audrey Zarif	11	11	10	11
(Turkey) Ece Haraç	11	8	11	5	4
(Brazil) Laura Watanabe	8	11	4	11	11
(Croatia) Hana Arapović	4	8	12	8
2	(Germany) Xiaona Shan	11	11	10	11

Second round
14	(England) Tin-Tin Ho	12	11	11	7	3
(France) Audrey Zarif	10	7	13	11	11
(Brazil) Laura Watanabe	3	8	7
2	(Germany) Xiaona Shan	11	11	11

Qualifying competition
(France) Audrey Zarif	11	8	7	7
2	(Germany) Xiaona Shan	9	11	11	11
