= Europe Smash – Sweden 2026 – Qualification =

Table tennis tournament qualification

The Europe Smash – Sweden 2026 – Qualification is a series of table tennis matches that take place on 8 and 9 August 2026 to determine the eight qualifiers for the tournament's main draw.

The qualification tournament is contested in two singles events: men's singles and women's singles.

A total of 64 players competed in each event in a knockout format, with only eight players from each event securing a place in the main draw.

== Qualifiers ==
=== Men's singles qualifiers ===
The following players qualified for the main draw:

- (Belgium) Cédric Nuytinck
- (Romania) Iulian Chirita
- (Singapore) Izaac Quek
- (Poland) Maciej Kubik
- (Spain) Álvaro Robles
- (Slovenia) Deni Kožul
- (Hungary) Csaba András
- (Poland) Miłosz Redzimski

=== Women's singles qualifiers ===
The following players qualified for the main draw:

- (Hong Kong) Su Tsz Tung
- (Chinese Taipei) Peng Yu-han
- (Chinese Taipei) Chien Tung-chuan
- (Romania) Elena Zaharia
- (Monaco) Xiaoxin Yang
- (South Korea) Yoo Ye-rin
- (Italy) Giorgia Piccolin
- (India) Diya Chitale

== Men's singles ==
=== Seeds ===
1. (England) Tom Jarvis (second round)
2. (Poland) Miłosz Redzimski (qualified)
3. (South Korea) Park Gyu-hyeon (qualifying competition)
4. (Croatia) Andrej Gaćina (second round)
5. (Egypt) Youssef Abdelaziz (first round)
6. (Germany) Wim Verdonschot (qualifying competition)
7. (Chinese Taipei) Kao Cheng-jui (qualifying competition)
8. (Moldova) Vladislav Ursu (qualifying competition)
9. (Hungary) Csaba András (qualified)
10. (Spain) Álvaro Robles (qualified)
11. (Portugal) Marcos Freitas (second round)
12. (Algeria) Mehdi Bouloussa (first round)
13. (Hong Kong) Baldwin Chan (second round)
14. (Portugal) Tiago Apolónia (first round)
15. (England) Liam Pitchford (second round)
16. (Belgium) Cédric Nuytinck (qualified)

=== First qualifier ===
First round
1	(England) Tom Jarvis	11	11	11
(Romania) Darius Movileanu	2	3	9
(India) Harmeet Desai	11	11	11
WC	(Sweden) Noa Dahlström	5	5	1
(United States) Sid Naresh	10	15	8	6
(Belgium) Martin Allegro	12	13	11	11
WC	(Sweden) Albin Ingeström	5	8	6
16	(Belgium) Cédric Nuytinck	11	11	11

Second round
1	(England) Tom Jarvis	11	11	4	8	6
(India) Harmeet Desai	6	7	11	11	11
(Belgium) Martin Allegro	12	9	11	16	8
16	(Belgium) Cédric Nuytinck	14	11	8	14	11

Qualifying competition
(India) Harmeet Desai	11	7	6	9
16	(Belgium) Cédric Nuytinck	6	11	11	11

=== Second qualifier ===
First round
11	(Portugal) Marcos Freitas	11	11	11
(New Zealand) Timothy Choi	5	3	7
(Romania) Iulian Chirita	11	8	11	11
(Chile) Gustavo Gomez	4	11	4	4
(Croatia) Ivor Ban	10	11	11	8	11
(Italy) Niagol Stoyanov	12	4	5	11	8
(Brazil) Leonardo Iizuka	9	5	6
8	(Moldova) Vladislav Ursu	11	11	11

Second round
11	(Portugal) Marcos Freitas	7	9	6
(Romania) Iulian Chirita	11	11	11
(Croatia) Ivor Ban	9	7	9
8	(Moldova) Vladislav Ursu	11	11	11

Qualifying competition
(Romania) Iulian Chirita	11	11	5	15
8	(Moldova) Vladislav Ursu	4	8	11	13

=== Third qualifier ===
First round
4	(Croatia) Andrej Gaćina	11	11	11
WC	(Sweden) Elias Sjögren	8	8	6
(Egypt) Mohamed Elbeiali	11	5	7	3
(England) Connor Green	7	11	11	11
(Slovakia) Ľubomír Pištej	10	11	8
(Singapore) Izaac Quek	12	13	11
WC	(Sweden) Anders Eriksson	10	11	11	9
15	(England) Liam Pitchford	12	13	6	11

Second round
4	(Croatia) Andrej Gaćina	11	12	10	12
(England) Connor Green	9	14	12	14
(Singapore) Izaac Quek	5	11	11	11
15	(England) Liam Pitchford	11	3	7	7

Qualifying competition
(England) Connor Green	5	11	8	7
(Singapore) Izaac Quek	11	9	11	11

=== Fourth qualifier ===
First round
12	(Algeria) Mehdi Bouloussa	11	7	11	6
(India) Payas Jain	13	11	5	11
(Benin) Abdel-Kader Salifou	10	7	6
(Poland) Maciej Kubik	12	11	11
(Serbia) Dimitrije Levajac	11	11	9	11
(Slovakia) Yang Wang	6	7	11	4
(Romania) Ovidiu Ionescu	11	11	11
5	(Egypt) Youssef Abdelaziz	5	5	7

Second round
(India) Payas Jain	7	3	8
(Poland) Maciej Kubik	11	11	11
(Serbia) Dimitrije Levajac	11	11	11
(Romania) Ovidiu Ionescu	7	9	6

Qualifying competition
(Poland) Maciej Kubik	7	9	11	11	11
(Serbia) Dimitrije Levajac	11	11	7	6	3

=== Fifth qualifier ===
First round
7	(Chinese Taipei) Kao Cheng-jui	12	11	11
WC	(Sweden) Martin Friis	10	8	9
(Iran) Noshad Alamiyan	11	11	6	7	7
(Poland) Marek Badowski	7	8	11	11	11
(Russia) Nikita Artemenko	11	11	11
(India) Akash Pal	7	6	6
(Luxembourg) Luka Mladenovic	9	11	7	5
10	(Spain) Álvaro Robles	11	8	11	11

Second round
7	(Chinese Taipei) Kao Cheng-jui	11	11	5	9	11
(Poland) Marek Badowski	7	8	11	11	1
(Russia) Nikita Artemenko	9	6	11	11	4
10	(Spain) Álvaro Robles	11	11	9	5	11

Qualifying competition
7	(Chinese Taipei) Kao Cheng-jui	11	10	7	11	9
10	(Spain) Álvaro Robles	7	12	11	7	11

=== Sixth qualifier ===
First round
14	(Portugal) Tiago Apolónia	11	11	3	10
(Slovenia) Deni Kožul	13	6	11	12
(Austria) Andreas Levenko	11	11	11
(New Zealand) Dean Shu	8	5	6
(Croatia) Filip Zeljko	5	8	6
(Germany) Ricardo Walther	11	11	11
(Chinese Taipei) Chang Yu-an	7	9	11	13
3	(South Korea) Park Gyu-hyeon	11	11	7	15

Second round
(Slovenia) Deni Kožul	11	10	11	11
(Austria) Andreas Levenko	9	12	8	9
(Germany) Ricardo Walther	8	11	8	9
3	(South Korea) Park Gyu-hyeon	11	9	11	11

Qualifying competition
(Slovenia) Deni Kožul	11	11	11
3	(South Korea) Park Gyu-hyeon	7	9	6

=== Seventh qualifier ===
First round
6	(Germany) Wim Verdonschot	11	11	11
(Spain) Juan Pérez	3	7	3
(Brazil) Guilherme Teodoro	9	10	11	11	11
WC	(Sweden) Adam Wallin	11	12	2	9	3
(Italy) John Oyebode	4	11	8	11
(Canada) Edward Ly	11	8	11	13
(Australia) Aditya Sareen	12	9	11	10	8
9	(Hungary) Csaba András	10	11	9	12	11

Second round
6	(Germany) Wim Verdonschot	11	11	11
(Brazil) Guilherme Teodoro	3	7	6
(Canada) Edward Ly	11	4	8
9	(Hungary) Csaba András	13	11	11

Qualifying competition
6	(Germany) Wim Verdonschot	9	5	11	8
9	(Hungary) Csaba András	11	11	8	11

=== Eighth qualifier ===
First round
13	(Hong Kong) Baldwin Chan	11	11	11
WC	(United States) Bosman Botha	4	7	5
(Hong Kong) Lam Siu Hang	11	14	7	9
(Chinese Taipei) Hung Jing-kai	8	16	11	11
(Italy) Matteo Mutti	11	7	9	14	5
(England) Samuel Walker	9	11	11	12	11
(Cameroon) Ylane Batix	5	4	6
2	(Poland) Miłosz Redzimski	11	11	11

Second round
13	(Hong Kong) Baldwin Chan	10	10	6
(Chinese Taipei) Hung Jing-kai	12	12	11
(England) Samuel Walker	6	10	4
2	(Poland) Miłosz Redzimski	11	12	11

Qualifying competition
(Chinese Taipei) Hung Jing-kai	9	11	11	8	11
2	(Poland) Miłosz Redzimski	11	9	7	11	13

== Women's singles ==
=== Seeds ===
1. (Chinese Taipei) Huang Yu-jie (qualifying competition)
2. (South Korea) Yang Ha-eun (second round)
3. (Chinese Taipei) Chien Tung-chuan (qualified)
4. (South Korea) Yoo Ye-rin (qualified)
5. (Germany) Xiaona Shan (second round)
6. (United States) Sally Moyland (qualifying competition)
7. (India) Yashaswini Ghorpade (first round)
8. (Chinese Taipei) Peng Yu-han (qualified)
9. (Portugal) Jieni Shao (second round)
10. (Monaco) Xiaoxin Yang (qualified)
11. (Singapore) Ser Lin Qian (first round)
12. (England) Tin-Tin Ho (second round)
13. (India) Diya Chitale (qualified)
14. (Hong Kong) Su Tsz Tung (qualified)
15. (Hong Kong) Ng Wing Lam (qualifying competition)
16. (Luxembourg) Sarah de Nutte (qualifying competition)

=== First qualifier ===
First round
1	(Chinese Taipei) Huang Yu-jie	11	13	11
WC	(South Korea) Heo Ye-rim	9	11	5
(Ukraine) Veronika Matiunina	7	5	5
(Romania) Adina Diaconu	11	11	11
(Australia) Constantina Psihogios	11	11	11
(Chile) Paulina Vega	7	8	9
(Turkey) Sibel Altınkaya	11	6	4	2
14	(Hong Kong) Su Tsz Tung	6	11	11	11

Second round
1	(Chinese Taipei) Huang Yu-jie	15	7	11	11	11
(Romania) Adina Diaconu	17	11	6	7	7
(Australia) Constantina Psihogios	8	11	4	4
14	(Hong Kong) Su Tsz Tung	11	7	11	11

Qualifying competition
1	(Chinese Taipei) Huang Yu-jie	9	10	11	11	6
14	(Hong Kong) Su Tsz Tung	11	12	3	9	11

=== Second qualifier ===
First round
9	(Portugal) Jieni Shao	11	18	10	9	11
(Poland) Katarzyna Węgrzyn	5	16	12	11	9
(Luxembourg) Xi Lian Ni	8	11	11	11
(Kazakhstan) Zauresh Akasheva	11	8	6	8
(Turkey) Ece Haraç	11	8	6	7
(Croatia) Lea Rakovac	8	11	11	11
WC	(Sweden) Agnes Svensson	5	3	5
8	(Chinese Taipei) Peng Yu-han	11	11	11

Second round
9	(Portugal) Jieni Shao	5	5	5
(Luxembourg) Xi Lian Ni	11	11	11
(Croatia) Lea Rakovac	8	10	11	11	6
8	(Chinese Taipei) Peng Yu-han	11	12	7	4	11

Qualifying competition
(Luxembourg) Xi Lian Ni	11	7	6	5
8	(Chinese Taipei) Peng Yu-han	9	11	11	11

=== Third qualifier ===
First round
3	(Chinese Taipei) Chien Tung-chuan	8	11	7	11	12
(Kazakhstan) Sarvinoz Mirkadirova	11	8	11	1	10
(Malaysia) Karen Lyne	9	9	11	6
(Poland) Zuzanna Wielgos	11	11	9	11
(France) Isa Cok	11	7	9	7
(Italy) Nicole Arlia	8	11	11	11
(Germany) Franziska Schreiner	7	9	11	7
16	(Luxembourg) Sarah de Nutte	11	11	9	11

Second round
3	(Chinese Taipei) Chien Tung-chuan	11	11	11
(Poland) Zuzanna Wielgos	8	4	3
(Italy) Nicole Arlia	9	6	5
16	(Luxembourg) Sarah de Nutte	11	11	11

Qualifying competition
3	(Chinese Taipei) Chien Tung-chuan	11	11	11
16	(Luxembourg) Sarah de Nutte	6	9	5

=== Fourth qualifier ===
First round
12	(England) Tin-Tin Ho	11	8	11	5	11
(Serbia) Sabina Šurjan	5	11	8	11	6
WC	(Sweden) Leah Tveit	8	11	4	7
(France) Audrey Zarif	11	9	11	11
(Romania) Elena Zaharia	5	11	13	11
(Italy) Debora Vivarelli	11	9	11	5
(Croatia) Ivana Malobabić	4	6	3
5	(Germany) Xiaona Shan	11	11	11

Second round
12	(England) Tin-Tin Ho	6	6	10
(France) Audrey Zarif	11	11	12
(Romania) Elena Zaharia	13	11	12	6	12
5	(Germany) Xiaona Shan	11	7	14	11	10

Qualifying competition
(France) Audrey Zarif	5	7	11	6
(Romania) Elena Zaharia	11	11	8	11

=== Fifth qualifier ===
First round
7	(India) Yashaswini Ghorpade	7	7	7
(Thailand) Orawan Paranang	11	11	11
WC	(Sweden) Alma Roose	8	10	6
(Brazil) Giulia Takahashi	11	12	11
WC	(Sweden) Angelina Bebawy	6	4	9
(Malaysia) Tee Ai Xin	11	11	11
WC	(Sweden) Alice Nilsson	4	5	6
10	(Monaco) Xiaoxin Yang	11	11	11

Second round
(Thailand) Orawan Paranang	11	11	11
(Brazil) Giulia Takahashi	6	6	5
(Malaysia) Tee Ai Xin	6	9	11
10	(Monaco) Xiaoxin Yang	11	11	13

Qualifying competition
(Thailand) Orawan Paranang	11	8	8
10	(Monaco) Xiaoxin Yang	13	11	11

=== Sixth qualifier ===
First round
15	(Hong Kong) Ng Wing Lam	11	14	11
(Belgium) Lilou Massart	5	12	6
(United States) Jessica Reyes Lai	13	11	7	11	11
(Chile) Daniela Ortega	15	9	11	7	7
(Brazil) Laura Watanabe	4	11	2	12
(Italy) Gaia Monfardini	11	7	11	14
(Slovakia) Tatiana Kukuľková	7	7	14
4	(South Korea) Yoo Ye-rin	11	11	16

Second round
15	(Hong Kong) Ng Wing Lam	11	11	11
(United States) Jessica Reyes Lai	4	5	8
(Italy) Gaia Monfardini	11	9	11	11	6
4	(South Korea) Yoo Ye-rin	7	11	8	13	11

Qualifying competition
15	(Hong Kong) Ng Wing Lam	7	12	9	4
4	(South Korea) Yoo Ye-rin	11	10	11	11

=== Seventh qualifier ===
First round
6	(United States) Sally Moyland	11	11	11
(Malaysia) Chang Li Sian	9	1	6
(Singapore) Tan Zhao Yun	12	11	13	11	11
(Croatia) Hana Arapović	14	2	15	6	9
(Spain) Sofia-Xuan Zhang	9	8	4
(Egypt) Mariam Alhodaby	11	11	11
(Italy) Giorgia Piccolin	7	11	11	11
11	(Singapore) Ser Lin Qian	11	9	8	7

Second round
6	(United States) Sally Moyland	8	8	11	11	11
(Singapore) Tan Zhao Yun	11	11	9	5	9
(Egypt) Mariam Alhodaby	11	13	5	6	5
(Italy) Giorgia Piccolin	8	11	11	11	11

Qualifying competition
6	(United States) Sally Moyland	11	11	3	4	8
(Italy) Giorgia Piccolin	6	2	11	11	11

=== Eighth qualifier ===
First round
13	(India) Diya Chitale	11	11	11
(Germany) Yuan Wan	8	4	5
(India) Divyanshi Bhowmick	9	11	9	11	11
(France) Camille Lutz	11	3	11	5	9
(Singapore) Loy Ming Ying	11	11	6	8	5
(India) Syndrela Das	5	8	11	11	11
(Serbia) Izabela Lupulesku	11	9	9	4
2	(South Korea) Yang Ha-eun	9	11	11	11

Second round
13	(India) Diya Chitale	11	11	11
(India) Divyanshi Bhowmick	4	8	3
(India) Syndrela Das	11	9	13	11
2	(South Korea) Yang Ha-eun	7	11	11	11

Qualifying competition
13	(India) Diya Chitale	8	11	7	11	11
(India) Syndrela Das	11	2	11	9	6
