= Russ Lavale =

Australian table tennis player

Russell Lavale
Personal information
- Born: 12 July 1974 (age 52)
- Height: 176 cm (5 ft 9 in)
- Weight: 80 kg (176 lb)

Russell Lavale (born 12 July 1974) is an Australian table tennis player who has competed at three Olympic Games.

He competed at the 1996 Atlanta Olympics in the men's doubles event with Paul Langley, finishing in equal 25th position. At the 2000 Sydney Olympics he competed in the men's singles and finished in equal 49th position. At the 2004 Athens Olympics he competed in both the singles and doubles events. In the singles he again finished in equal 49th position, and in the doubles, partnered with Trevor Brown, he finished equal 25th.

He also competed at the 2002 Manchester and 2006 Melbourne Commonwealth Games in the men's singles, doubles and mixed doubles events.

In 2002 Lavale won his first singles championship and his fifth doubles championship at the Oceania Table Tennis Championships.
