= 2025 ITTF World Youth Championships =

Fifth edition of the table tennis World Youth Championships

Tournament details
- Dates: 23–30 November 2025
- Edition: 5th
- Venue: BTarena
- Location: Cluj-Napoca, Romania

The 2025 ITTF World Youth Championships was the fifth edition of the ITTF World Youth Championships, held at the BTarena in Cluj-Napoca, Romania, from 23 to 30 November 2025.

== Medal table ==
* Host nation (Romania)

Rank	Nation	Gold	Silver	Bronze	Total
1	China	6	5	6	17
2	Japan	3	4	4	11
3	Chinese Taipei	2	0	5	7
4	Germany	1.5	0	1	2.5
5	Thailand	1	0	0	1
6	Wales	0.5	0.5	1	2
7	South Korea	0	1	6	7
8	India	0	1	2	3
9	Italy	0	1	0	1
9	Turkey	0	1	0	1
11	Romania*	0	0.5	0.5	1
12	Malaysia	0	0	1	1
13	Egypt	0	0	0.5	0.5
13	Portugal	0	0	0.5	0.5
13	Ukraine	0	0	0.5	0.5
Totals (15 entries)		14	14	28	56

== Medallists ==
=== Under-19 ===
Event	Gold	Silver	Bronze
Boys' singles	(Japan) Ryuusei Kawakami	(Japan) Kazuki Yoshiyama	(China) Li Hechen
Boys' singles	(Japan) Ryuusei Kawakami	(Japan) Kazuki Yoshiyama	(China) Wen Ruibo
Girls' singles	(China) Qin Yuxuan	(China) Zong Geman	(Wales) Anna Hursey
Girls' singles	(China) Qin Yuxuan	(China) Zong Geman	(Japan) Yuna Ojio
Boys' doubles	(Chinese Taipei) Kuo Guan-hong (Chinese Taipei) Hsu Hsien-chia	(Japan) Kazuki Yoshiyama (Japan) Ryuusei Kawakami	(China) Wen Ruibo (China) Li Hechen
Boys' doubles	(Chinese Taipei) Kuo Guan-hong (Chinese Taipei) Hsu Hsien-chia	(Japan) Kazuki Yoshiyama (Japan) Ryuusei Kawakami	(Portugal) Tiago Abiodun (Romania) Iulian Chirita
Girls' doubles	(Germany) Mia Griesel (Wales) Anna Hursey	(China) Zong Geman (China) Qin Yuxuan	(Chinese Taipei) Yeh Yi-tian (Chinese Taipei) Wu Ying-syuan
Girls' doubles	(Germany) Mia Griesel (Wales) Anna Hursey	(China) Zong Geman (China) Qin Yuxuan	(Egypt) Hana Goda (Ukraine) Veronika Matiunina
Mixed doubles	(China) Li Hechen (China) Qin Yuxuan	(Romania) Iulian Chirita (Wales) Anna Hursey	(South Korea) Kim Ga-on (South Korea) Choi Na-hyun
Mixed doubles	(China) Li Hechen (China) Qin Yuxuan	(Romania) Iulian Chirita (Wales) Anna Hursey	(Japan) Ryuusei Kawakami (Japan) Sachi Aoki
Boys' team	Japan; Kazuki Yoshiyama; Tamito Watanabe; Kohaku Nakano; Ryuusei Kawakami	India; Abhinandh Pradhivadhi; Priyanuj Bhattacharya; Punit Biswas; Ankur Bhattacharjee	South Korea; Kim Ga-on; Choi Ji-wook; Moon Sun-woong; Choi Ho-jun
Boys' team	Japan; Kazuki Yoshiyama; Tamito Watanabe; Kohaku Nakano; Ryuusei Kawakami	India; Abhinandh Pradhivadhi; Priyanuj Bhattacharya; Punit Biswas; Ankur Bhattacharjee	Chinese Taipei; Lin Chin-ting; Hsu Hsien-chia; Kuo Guan-hong
Girls' team	China; Qin Yuxuan; Zong Geman; Zhu Ziyu; Yao Ruixuan	Japan; Mao Takamori; Sachi Aoki; Misuzu Takeya; Yuna Ojio	South Korea; Choi Na-hyun; Yoo Ye-rin; Moon Cho-won; Kim Eun-seo
Girls' team	China; Qin Yuxuan; Zong Geman; Zhu Ziyu; Yao Ruixuan	Japan; Mao Takamori; Sachi Aoki; Misuzu Takeya; Yuna Ojio	Chinese Taipei; Yeh Yi-tian; Chen Chia-i; Wu Ying-syuan; Chen Min-hsin

=== Under-15 ===
Event	Gold	Silver	Bronze
Boys' singles	(China) Yu Haiyang	(China) Zhou Guanhong	(Chinese Taipei) Chen Kai-cheng
Boys' singles	(China) Yu Haiyang	(China) Zhou Guanhong	(South Korea) Ma Yeong-min
Girls' singles	(Germany) Koharu Itagaki	(China) Zhu Qihui	(Japan) Cocona Muramatsu
Girls' singles	(Germany) Koharu Itagaki	(China) Zhu Qihui	(India) Divyanshi Bhowmick
Boys' doubles	(China) Zhou Guanhong (China) Yu Haiyang	(Turkey) Gorkem Ocal (Turkey) Kenan Kahraman	(Japan) Kenyu Hiratsuka (Japan) Soma Ono
Boys' doubles	(China) Zhou Guanhong (China) Yu Haiyang	(Turkey) Gorkem Ocal (Turkey) Kenan Kahraman	(Chinese Taipei) Cheng Min-hsiu (Chinese Taipei) Chen Kai-cheng
Girls' doubles	(China) Zhu Qihui (China) Liu Ziling	(Japan) Kokomi Ishida (Japan) Cocona Muramatsu	(Germany) Josephina Neumann (Germany) Koharu Itagaki
Girls' doubles	(China) Zhu Qihui (China) Liu Ziling	(Japan) Kokomi Ishida (Japan) Cocona Muramatsu	(South Korea) Heo Ye-rim (South Korea) Kim Min-seo
Mixed doubles	(Thailand) Thitaphat Preechayan (Thailand) Kulapassr Vijitviriyagul	(China) Yu Haiyang (China) Zhu Qihui	(China) Zhou Guanhong (China) Liu Ziling
Mixed doubles	(Thailand) Thitaphat Preechayan (Thailand) Kulapassr Vijitviriyagul	(China) Yu Haiyang (China) Zhu Qihui	(Malaysia) Lee Hong An (Malaysia) Mohd Dania
Boys' team	Chinese Taipei; Cheng Min-hsiu; Chen Kai-cheng; Yu Yi-cing; Cheng Yuan-lun	Italy; Francesco Trevisan; Danilo Faso; Giulio Campagna; Pietro Campagna	China; Yu Haiyang; Zhou Guanhong; Xiao Baixin; Wang Zining
Boys' team	Chinese Taipei; Cheng Min-hsiu; Chen Kai-cheng; Yu Yi-cing; Cheng Yuan-lun	Italy; Francesco Trevisan; Danilo Faso; Giulio Campagna; Pietro Campagna	South Korea; Lee Seung-soo; Ma Yeong-min; Lee Hyeon-ho; Kim Ji-hu
Girls' team	Japan; Kokomi Ishida; Cocona Muramatsu; Hisa Uriu; Aoba Takahashi	South Korea; Heo Ye-rim; Kim Min-seo; Seo A-yeong; Lee Hae-lin	China; Liu Ziling; Zhu Qihui; Zhao Wangqi; Yang Huize
Girls' team	Japan; Kokomi Ishida; Cocona Muramatsu; Hisa Uriu; Aoba Takahashi	South Korea; Heo Ye-rim; Kim Min-seo; Seo A-yeong; Lee Hae-lin	India; Divyanshi Bhowmick; Naisha Rewaskar; Ananya Muralidharan; Ankolika Chakraborty

== Results ==
=== U-19 Boys' Singles ===
Round of 32
(South Korea) Kim Ga-on	4
(France) Flavio Mourier	2
(Puerto Rico) Steven Moreno	3
(China) Li Hechen	4
(United States) Nandan Naresh	4
(Hungary) Blazs Lei	3
(Brazil) Leonardo Iizuka	3
(Iran) Benyamin Faraji	4
(Chinese Taipei) Hsu Hsien-chia	4
(Poland) Marcel Blaszczyk	2
(Australia) Aditya Sareen	3
(Romania) Iulian Chirita	4
(Japan) Kazuki Yoshiyama	4
(Tunisia) Wassim Essid	0
(Egypt) Badr Mostafa	2
(India) Ankur Bhattacharjee	4
(Chinese Taipei) Kuo Guan-hong	2
(Portugal) Tiago Abiodun	4
(Hungary) David Szantosi	3
(Spain) Daniel Berzosa	4
(India) Abhinandh Pradhivadhi	4
(Romania) Dragos Bujor	2
(Slovakia) Samuel Arpas	1
(China) Wen Ruibo	4
(Kazakhstan) Alan Kurmangaliyev	4
(Puerto Rico) Enrique Rios	0
(Brazil) Lucas Romanski	1
(France) Flavien Coton	4
(South Korea) Choi Ji-wook	4
(Poland) Rafal Formela	2
(New Zealand) Timothi Choi	1
(Japan) Ryuusei Kawakami	4

Round of 16
(South Korea) Kim Ga-on	2
(China) Li Hechen	4
(United States) Nandan Naresh	3
(Iran) Benyamin Faraji	4
(Chinese Taipei) Hsu Hsien-chia	3
(Romania) Iulian Chirita	4
(Japan) Kazuki Yoshiyama	4
(India) Ankur Bhattacharjee	0
(Portugal) Tiago Abiodun	2
(Spain) Daniel Berzosa	4
(India) Abhinandh Pradhivadhi	1
(China) Wen Ruibo	4
(Kazakhstan) Alan Kurmangaliyev	3
(France) Flavien Coton	4
(South Korea) Choi Ji-wook	2
(Japan) Ryuusei Kawakami	4

Quarter-finals
(China) Li Hechen	4
(Iran) Benyamin Faraji	0
(Romania) Iulian Chirita	1
(Japan) Kazuki Yoshiyama	4
(Spain) Daniel Berzosa	0
(China) Wen Ruibo	4
(France) Flavien Coton	3
(Japan) Ryuusei Kawakami	4

Semi-finals
(China) Li Hechen	1
(Japan) Kazuki Yoshiyama	4
(China) Wen Ruibo	3
(Japan) Ryuusei Kawakami	4

Finals
(Japan) Kazuki Yoshiyama	2
(Japan) Ryuusei Kawakami	4

=== U-19 Girls' Singles ===
Round of 32

Round of 16

Quarter-finals

Semi-finals

Finals

=== U-19 Boys' Doubles ===
Round of 16

Quarter-finals

Semi-finals

Finals

=== U-19 Girls' Doubles ===
Round of 16

Quarter-finals

Semi-finals

Finals

=== U-19 Mixed Doubles ===
Round of 32
(France) F Mourier (France) E Pujol	2
(India) A Bhattacharjee (India) T Kotecha	3

Round of 16
(Spain) D Berzosa (Ukraine) V Matiunina
(India) A Bhattacharjee (India) T Kotecha

Quarter-finals

Semi-finals

Finals

=== U-19 Boys' Team ===
Round of 16
11	Australia	0
8	Poland	3
7	Brazil	3
12	Portugal	1
9	Romania	1
6	France	3
5	China	3
10	Slovakia	1

Quarter-finals
1	Japan	3
8	Poland	0
7	Brazil	1
3	South Korea	3
4	India	3
6	France	0
5	China	1
2	Chinese Taipei	3

Semi-finals
1	Japan	3
3	South Korea	1
4	India	3
2	Chinese Taipei	2

Finals
1	Japan	3
4	India	0

=== U-19 Girls' Team ===
Round of 16
9	France	3
7	Poland	0
8	India	3
10	Romania	2
11	Australia	1
5	Egypt	3
6	Germany	3
12	Canada	0

Quarter-finals
1	China	3
9	France	1
8	India	2
3	Chinese Taipei	3
4	South Korea	3
5	Egypt	2
6	Germany	0
2	Japan	3

Semi-finals
1	China	3
3	Chinese Taipei	0
4	South Korea	0
2	Japan	3

Finals
1	China	3
2	Japan	2

=== U-15 Boys' Singles ===
Round of 32
(South Korea) Lee Seung-soo	4
(Hungary) Mark Gergely	1
(Germany) Jonas Rinderer	2
(Thailand) Thitaphat Preechayan	4
(Iran) Faraz Shakiba	4
(Brazil) Vitor Thiofilo	0
(Romania) Raul Creucu	0
(China) Yu Haiyang	4
(Japan) Soma Ono	4
(Malaysia) Lee Hong An	2
(Italy) Francesco Trevisan	4
(United States) Kef Noorani	3
(Chinese Taipei) Chen Kai-cheng	4
(New Zealand) Eli Ho	2
(Egypt) Asser Sameh	1
(Turkey) Görkem Öçal	4
(Italy) Danilo Faso	4
(England) Kacper Piwowar	0
(Poland) Jan Mrugala	4
(Hong Kong) Li Ki Ho	0
(Iran) Mobin Amiri	1
(Turkey) Kenan Kahraman	4
(Romania) Andrei Tibirna	1
(China) Zhou Guanhong	4
(South Korea) Ma Yeong-min	4
(Algeria) Bilel Zouitene	2
(New Zealand) August Xiao	1
(Chinese Taipei) Cheng Min-hsiu	4
(Japan) Kenyu Hiratsuka	4
(India) Ritvik Gupta	3
(United States) Kyler Chen	0
(Colombia) Emanuel Otálvaro	4

Round of 16
(South Korea) Lee Seung-soo	4
(Thailand) Thitaphat Preechayan	2
(Iran) Faraz Shakiba	0
(China) Yu Haiyang	4
(Japan) Soma Ono	4
(Italy) Francesco Trevisan	0
(Chinese Taipei) Chen Kai-cheng	4
(Turkey) Görkem Öçal	0
(Italy) Danilo Faso	4
(Poland) Jan Mrugala	0
(Turkey) Kenan Kahraman	2
(China) Zhou Guanhong	4
(South Korea) Ma Yeong-min	4
(Chinese Taipei) Cheng Min-hsiu	1
(Japan) Kenyu Hiratsuka	2
(Colombia) Emanuel Otálvaro	4

Quarter-finals
(South Korea) Lee Seung-soo	0
(China) Yu Haiyang	4
(Japan) Soma Ono	1
(Chinese Taipei) Chen Kai-cheng	4
(Italy) Danilo Faso	1
(China) Zhou Guanhong	4
(South Korea) Ma Yeong-min	4
(Colombia) Emanuel Otálvaro	2

Semi-finals
(China) Yu Haiyang	4
(Chinese Taipei) Chen Kai-cheng	1
(China) Zhou Guanhong	4
(South Korea) Ma Yeong-min	0

Finals
(China) Yu Haiyang	4
(China) Zhou Guanhong	2

=== U-15 Girls' Singles ===
Round of 32
1	(South Korea) Heo Ye-rim	4
18	(Chinese Taipei) Le Yu-en	2
26	(Romania) Patricia Stoica	4
12	(United States) Irene Yeoh	2
11	(Japan) Cocona Muramatsu	4
23	(Tunisia) Ela Saidi	0
29	(Algeria) Tania Morice	1
5	(France) Nina Guozheng	4
7	(China) Liu Ziling	4
25	(Malaysia) Cheah Yuzheng	2
21	(India) Ananya Muralidharan	1
15	(Thailand) Kulapassr Vijitviriyagul	4
10	(Iran) Vania Yavari	4
32	(New Zealand) Anzhuo Han	2
24	(Hong Kong) Yeung Yee Lam	0
4	(Germany) Koharu Itagaki	4
3	(India) Divyanshi Bhowmick	4
28	(Algeria) Jade Morice	0
22	(Austria) Mariia Lytvyn	0
9	(South Korea) Kim Min-seo	4
16	(Chinese Taipei) Lin Wan-rong	4
30	(Romania) Maya Madar	0
31	(Australia) Daisy Xie	0
6	(Japan) Kokomi Ishida	4
8	(Germany) Josephina Neumann	4
27	(Croatia) Lana Benko	2
19	(United States) Abigail Yu	4
13	(Malaysia) Mohammad Dania	3
14	(Czech Republic) Hanka Kodet	2
20	(Hong Kong) Yuen Sum Lok	4
17	(France) Alexia Nodin	0
2	(China) Zhu Qihui	4

Round of 16
1	(South Korea) Heo Ye-rim	4
(Romania) Patricia Stoica	1
11	(Japan) Cocona Muramatsu	4
5	(France) Nina Guozheng	3
7	(China) Liu Ziling	1
15	(Thailand) Kulapassr Vijitviriyagul	4
10	(Iran) Vania Yavari	0
4	(Germany) Koharu Itagaki	4
3	(India) Divyanshi Bhowmick	4
9	(South Korea) Kim Min-seo	2
16	(Chinese Taipei) Lin Wan-rong	0
6	(Japan) Kokomi Ishida	4
8	(Germany) Josephina Neumann	4
19	(United States) Abigail Yu	0
20	(Hong Kong) Yuen Sum Lok	1
2	(China) Zhu Qihui	4

Quarter-finals
1	(South Korea) Heo Ye-rim	3
11	(Japan) Cocona Muramatsu	4
15	(Thailand) Kulapassr Vijitviriyagul	2
4	(Germany) Koharu Itagaki	4
3	(India) Divyanshi Bhowmick	4
6	(Japan) Kokomi Ishida	2
8	(Germany) Josephina Neumann	1
2	(China) Zhu Qihui	4

Semi-finals
11	(Japan) Cocona Muramatsu	3
4	(Germany) Koharu Itagaki	4
3	(India) Divyanshi Bhowmick	1
2	(China) Zhu Qihui	4

Finals
4	(Germany) Koharu Itagaki	4
2	(China) Zhu Qihui	2

=== U-15 Boys' Doubles ===
Round of 16

Quarter-finals

Semi-finals

Finals

=== U-15 Girls' Doubles ===
Round of 16
(India) Divyanshi Bhowmick (India) Ananya Muralidharan
(Japan) Kokomi Ishida (Japan) Cocona Muramatsu
(Austria) Mariia Lytvyn (Romania) Maya Madar
(Algeria) Jad Morice (Algeria) Tania Morice
(Malaysia) Dania Mohammed (Malaysia) Cheah Yuzheng
(Thailand) Kulapassr Vijitviriyagul (Croatia) Lana Benko
(Iran) Vania Yavari (Australia) Daisy Xie
(Germany) Josephinna Neumann (Germany) Koharu Itagaki
(China) Zhu Qihui (China) Liu Ziling
(United States) Irene Yeoh (United States) Abigail Yu
(Czech Republic) Hanka Kodet (Romania) Patricia Stoika
(Hong Kong) Yuen Sum Lok (Hong Kong) Yeung Yee Lam
(New Zealand) Anzhuo Han (Tunisia) Ela Saidi
(South Korea) Heo Ye-rim (South Korea) Kim Min-seo
(Chinese Taipei) Lin Wan-rong (Chinese Taipei) Lu Yu-en
(France) Nina Guozheng (France) Alexia Nodin

Quarter-finals

Semi-finals

Finals

=== U-15 Mixed Doubles ===
Round of 32

Round of 16

Quarter-finals

Semi-finals

Finals

=== U-15 Boys' Team ===
Round of 16
10	United States	3
8	Germany	1
5	Chinese Taipei	3
9	India	0
11	Romania	0
6	Italy	3
7	Turkey	3
12	New Zealand	1

Quarter-finals
1	South Korea	3
10	United States	0
5	Chinese Taipei	3
4	Iran	0
3	Japan	1
6	Italy	3
7	Turkey	1
2	China	3

Semi-finals
1	South Korea	2
5	Chinese Taipei	3
6	Italy	3
2	China	1

Final
5	Chinese Taipei	3
6	Italy	2

=== U-15 Girls' Team ===
Round of 16
11	Australia	1
7	France	3
5	Germany	3
10	Hong Kong	1
9	Malaysia	0
8	Chinese Taipei	3
6	United States	3
12	Romania	0

Quarter-finals
1	South Korea	3
7	France	1
5	Germany	1
4	India	3
3	Japan	3
8	Chinese Taipei	1
6	United States	0
2	China	3

Semi-finals
1	South Korea	3
4	India	0
3	Japan	3
2	China	0

Final
1	South Korea	1
3	Japan	3
