= Oceania Table Tennis Championships =

The Oceania Table Tennis Championships is a biennial table tennis tournament held by Oceania Table Tennis Federation (OTTF). Between 1996 and 2010, the tournament was held in conjunction with Oceania Junior Table Tennis Championships. In 2012 and 2014, the men's singles and women's singles events were held as the ITTF-Oceania Cup, which is the sole qualification event for the prestigious ITTF World Cup.

== Results ==
Year	City	Team		Singles		Doubles		
Year	City	Men's	Women's	Men's	Women's	Men's	Women's	Mixed
2026	Ballarat	Australia	Australia	(Australia) Finn Luu	(Australia) Yangzi Liu	(Australia) Finn Luu (Australia) Nicholas Lum	(Australia) Yangzi Liu (Australia) Constantina Psihogios	(Australia) Nicholas Lum (Australia) Yangzi Liu
2025	Christchurch	Australia	Australia	(Australia) Nicholas Lum	(Australia) Yangzi Liu	(Australia) Finn Luu (Australia) Nicholas Lum	(Australia) Yangzi Liu (Australia) Min Hyung Jee	(Australia) Nicholas Lum (Australia) Yangzi Liu
2024	Auckland	Australia	Australia	(Australia) Hwan Bae	(Australia) Min Hyung Jee	(Australia) Finn Luu (Australia) Nicholas Lum	(Australia) Yangzi Liu (Australia) Min Hyung Jee	(Australia) Nicholas Lum (Australia) Yangzi Liu
2023	Townsville	Australia	Australia	(Australia) Aditya Sareen	(Australia) Yangzi Liu	(Australia) Nicholas Lum (Australia) Finn Luu	(Australia) Minhyung Jee (Australia) Jian Fang Lay	(Australia) Aditya Sareen (Australia) Yangzi Liu
2022	Melbourne	Australia	Australia	(Australia) Nicholas Lum	(Australia) Yangzi Liu	(Australia) Nicholas Lum (Australia) Finn Luu	(Australia) Yangzi Liu (Australia) Chunyi Feng	(Australia) Nicholas Lum (Australia) Minhyung Jee
2018	Gold Coast	Australia	Australia	(Australia) Chris Yan	(Australia) Jian Fang Lay	(Australia) Hu Heming (Australia) Chris Yan	(Australia) Michelle Bromley (Australia) Melissa Tapper	(Australia) Chris Yan (Australia) Jian Fang Lay
2016	Bendigo	Australia	Australia	(Australia) Yan Xin	(Australia) Jian Fang Lay	(Kiribati) Choy Freddy (Vanuatu) Yoshua Shing	(New Zealand) Natalie Paterson (New Zealand) Ruofei Rao	(New Zealand) Lin Yi-sien (New Zealand) Ruofei Rao
2014	Bendigo	Australia	Australia	(Australia) William Henzell	(Australia) Jian Fang Lay	(Australia) David Powell (Australia) Kane Townsend	(Australia) Zhenhua Dederko (Australia) Melissa Tapper	(Australia) David Powell (Australia) Miao Miao
2012	Suva	Australia	Australia	(Australia) William Henzell	(New Zealand) Li Chunli	(Australia) David Powell (Australia) Kane Townsend	(Australia) Jian Fang Lay (Australia) Miao Miao	(Australia) Frank Robert (Australia) Jian Fang Lay
2010	Auckland	Australia	Australia	(Australia) William Henzell	(New Zealand) Li Karen Jinli	(Australia) William Henzell (Australia) Jiapeng Justin Han	(Australia) Jian Fang Lay (Australia) Miao Miao	(Australia) William Henzell (Australia) Miao Miao
2008	Papeete	Australia B	Australia	(Australia) Trent Carter	(Australia) Miao Miao	(Australia) Chamara Fernando (Australia) Scott Houston	(Australia) Miao Miao (Australia) Melissa Tapper	
2006	Geelong	Australia	Australia	(Australia) William Henzell	(New Zealand) Li Karen Jinli	(Australia) Kiet Song Tran (Australia) Chi Ho George Tang	(Australia) Miao Miao (Australia) Stephanie Sang Xu	(Australia) William Henzell (Australia) Miao Miao
2004	Whangārei	New Zealand	Australia	(Australia) William Henzell	(Australia) Miao Miao	(Australia) William Henzell (Australia) David Zalcberg	(New Zealand) Li Chunli (New Zealand) Li Karen Jinli	
2002	Suva	New Zealand	Australia	(Australia) Russ Lavale	(Australia) Jian Fang Lay	(Australia) Jian Fang Lay (Australia) Miao Miao	(Australia) Jian Fang Lay (Australia) Miao Miao	
2000	Koumac	Australia	Australia	(Australia) Simon Gerada	(New Zealand) Li Chunli	(Australia) Trevor Brown (Australia) Russ Lavale	(New Zealand) Li Chunli (New Zealand) Li Karen Jinli	
1998	Bendigo	New Zealand	New Zealand	(Australia) Mark Smythe	(New Zealand) Li Chunli	(Australia) Trevor Brown (Australia) Russ Lavale	(New Zealand) Li Chunli (New Zealand) Li Karen Jinli	
1996	Auckland	Australia	Australia	(New Zealand) Peter Stuart Jackson	(New Zealand) Li Chunli	(Australia) Paul Langley (Australia) Russ Lavale	(New Zealand) Li Chunli (New Zealand) Li Karen Jinli	
1994	Papeete	Australia	Australia	(Australia) Paul Langley	(Australia) Shirley Zhou	(Australia) Dennis Makaling (Australia) Jamie Perry	(Australia) Kerri Tepper (Australia) Shirley Zhou	
1993	Croydon	New Zealand	Australia	(Australia) Dennis Makaling	(Australia) Kerri Tepper	(Australia) Brett Clarke (Australia) Russ Lavale	(Australia) Kerri Tepper (Australia) Shirley Zhou	
1990	Palmerston North	Australia	Australia	(New Zealand) Peter Stuart Jackson	(New Zealand) Li Chunli	(Australia) Peng Huy Quach (Australia) Glenn Tepper	(Australia) Ying Catherine Kwok (Australia) Kerri Tepper	
1988	Noumea	New Zealand	Australia	(New Zealand) Barry John Griffiths	(Australia) Kerri Tepper	(New Zealand) Barry John Griffiths (New Zealand) Peter Stuart Jackson	(Australia) Nadia Bisiach (Australia) Kerri Tepper	
1986	Ballarat	Australia	Australia	(Australia) Tommy Danielsson	(Australia) Kerri Tepper	(New Zealand) Barry John Griffiths (New Zealand) Peter Stuart Jackson	(Australia) Nadia Bisiach (Australia) Kerri Tepper	
1982	Sydney	Australia	New Zealand	(Australia) Paul Pinkewich	(New Zealand) Christine Lee-Little	(Australia) Tommy Danielsson (Australia) Glenn Tepper	(New Zealand) Christine Lee-Little (New Zealand) Jan Morris	
1978	Auckland	Australia	New Zealand	(Australia) Paul Pinkewich	(New Zealand) Christine Lee-Little	(Australia) Robert Javor (Australia) Stephen Knapp	(New Zealand) Angela Brackenridge (New Zealand) Jan Morris	

== See also ==
- World Table Tennis Championships
- List of table tennis players
