= 2024 Oceania Table Tennis Championships =

- Date: 15–18 October 2024
- Edition: 22nd
- Location: Auckland, New Zealand
- Venue: Auckland Table Tennis Association
← 2023 ·	Oceania Table Tennis Championships	· 2025 →

The 2024 Oceania Table Tennis Championships was a table tennis tournament that was held in Auckland, New Zealand, from 15 to 18 October 2024.

== Medalists ==
Event	Gold	Silver	Bronze
Men's singles	(Australia) Hwan Bae	(Australia) Aditya Sareen	(Australia) Nicholas Lum
Men's singles	(Australia) Hwan Bae	(Australia) Aditya Sareen	(Australia) Finn Luu
Women's singles	(Australia) Min Hyung Jee	(Australia) Yangzi Liu	(Australia) Constantina Psihogios
Women's singles	(Australia) Min Hyung Jee	(Australia) Yangzi Liu	(Australia) Melissa Tapper
Men's doubles	(Australia) Finn Luu (Australia) Nicholas Lum	(Australia) Aditya Sareen (Australia) Hwan Bae	(New Zealand) Dean Shu (New Zealand) Timothy Choi
Men's doubles	(Australia) Finn Luu (Australia) Nicholas Lum	(Australia) Aditya Sareen (Australia) Hwan Bae	(New Zealand) Maxwell Henderson (New Zealand) Alfred Dela Pena
Women's doubles	(Australia) Yangzi Liu (Australia) Min Hyung Jee	(Australia) Constantina Psihogios (Australia) Melissa Tapper	(New Zealand) Josephine Chong (New Zealand) Ayumi Moriyama
Women's doubles	(Australia) Yangzi Liu (Australia) Min Hyung Jee	(Australia) Constantina Psihogios (Australia) Melissa Tapper	(New Zealand) Jocelyn Lam (New Zealand) Lisa Gear
Mixed doubles	(Australia) Nicholas Lum (Australia) Yangzi Liu	(Australia) Finn Luu (Australia) Min Hyung Jee	(Australia) Hwan Bae (Australia) Constantina Psihogios
Mixed doubles	(Australia) Nicholas Lum (Australia) Yangzi Liu	(Australia) Finn Luu (Australia) Min Hyung Jee	(New Zealand) Dean Shu (New Zealand) Jocelyn Lam
Men's team	Australia; Aditya Sareen; Nicholas Lum; Finn Luu; Hwan Bae	New Zealand; Timothy Choi; Jack Chen; Dean Shu; Alfred Dela Pena	New Caledonia; Olivier Clouet; Jeremy Dey; Jérôme Morriseau
Women's team	Australia; Constantina Psihogios; Min Hyung Jee; Melissa Tapper; Yangzi Liu	Only two teams	

== Medal table ==
* Host nation (New Zealand)

Rank	Nation	Gold	Silver	Bronze	Total
1	Australia	7	5	5	17
2	New Zealand*	0	1	5	6
3	New Caledonia	0	0	1	1
Totals (3 entries)		7	6	11	24
