= Table tennis at the 2026 Summer Youth Olympics – Women's singles =

Girls' singles at the 2026 Summer Youth Olympics
- Venue: Dakar Expo Center (DEX Pavillon A)
- Dates: 1–5 November 2026
- Competitors: 32

Table tennis at the 2026 Summer Youth Olympics – Women's singles is one of the events at the 2026 Summer Youth Olympics in Dakar, Senegal. It is held from 1 to 5 November 2026 at the Dakar Expo Center (DEX Pavillon A).

== Format ==
The tournament consists of a preliminary stage with 8 groups of 4 players. The top two players from each group advance to a 16-player single-elimination knockout stage. All matches are played as best-of-five games.

== Seedings ==
Seedings are based on the ITTF Youth Rankings published on October 26, 2026.

1. (Japan) Miku Matsushima
2. (Hong Kong) Su Tsz Tung
3. (China) Yao Ruixuan
4. (France) Nina Guo Zheng
5. (Chinese Taipei) Chen Min-hsin
6. (Germany) Koharu Itagaki
7. (South Korea) Heo Yerim
8. (India) Syndrela Das
9. (Portugal) Julia Leal
10. (Singapore) Loy Ming Ying
11. (Austria) Nina Skerbinz
12. (Poland) Katarzyna Rajkowska
13. (Czech Republic) Hanka Kode
14. (Antigua and Barbuda) Stuti Kashyap
15. (Algeria) Tania Morice
16. (Puerto Rico) Valentina Davila
17. (Egypt) Yara Elbadawy
18. (Venezuela) Dakota Ferrer
19. (Brazil) Bianca Borges
20. (Thailand) Kulapassr Vijitviriyagul
21. (Romania) Andreea Baiasu
22. (Tunisia) Ela Saidi
23. (New Zealand) Anzhuo Han
24. (Ghana) Joanita Borteye
25. (Chile) Catalina Ramirez
26. (Ecuador) Karolayn Maldonado
27. (Uganda) Jemimah Nakawala
28. (Australia) Daisy Xie
29. (Nigeria) Favour Ojo
30. (Peru) Natzumi Aquije
31. (Senegal) Marieme Diallo
32. (Madagascar) Tina Andriantahina

== Preliminary stage ==
The top two players from each group advanced to the knockout stage.

=== Group 1 ===
| Player | Pld | W | L | GW | GL | Pts |
|---|---|---|---|---|---|---|
| (Japan) Miku Matsushima (1) | 3 | 3 | 0 | 9 | 0 | 6 |
| (Antigua and Barbuda) Stuti Kashyap (14) | 3 | 2 | 1 | 6 | 5 | 5 |
| (Brazil) Bianca Borges (19) | 3 | 1 | 2 | 5 | 7 | 4 |
| (Peru) Natzumi Aquije (30) | 3 | 0 | 3 | 1 | 9 | 3 |

=== Group 2 ===
| Player | Pld | W | L | GW | GL | Pts |
|---|---|---|---|---|---|---|
| (Hong Kong) Su Tsz Tung (2) | 3 | 3 | 0 | 9 | 0 | 6 |
| (Czech Republic) Hanka Kode (13) | 3 | 2 | 1 | 6 | 4 | 5 |
| (Egypt) Yara Elbadawy (17) | 3 | 1 | 2 | 3 | 7 | 4 |
| (Nigeria) Favour Ojo (29) | 3 | 0 | 3 | 2 | 9 | 3 |

=== Group 3 ===
| Player | Pld | W | L | GW | GL | Pts |
|---|---|---|---|---|---|---|
| (China) Yao Ruixuan (3) | 3 | 3 | 0 | 9 | 0 | 6 |
| (Algeria) Tania Morice (15) | 3 | 2 | 1 | 6 | 5 | 5 |
| (Venezuela) Dakota Ferrer (18) | 3 | 1 | 2 | 5 | 6 | 4 |
| (Senegal) Marieme Diallo (31) | 3 | 0 | 3 | 0 | 9 | 3 |

=== Group 4 ===
| Player | Pld | W | L | GW | GL | Pts |
|---|---|---|---|---|---|---|
| (France) Nina Guo Zheng (4) | 3 | 3 | 0 | 9 | 2 | 6 |
| (Thailand) Kulapassr Vijitviriyagul (20) | 3 | 2 | 1 | 7 | 3 | 5 |
| (Puerto Rico) Valentina Davila (16) | 3 | 1 | 2 | 4 | 6 | 4 |
| (Madagascar) Tina Andriantahina (32) | 3 | 0 | 3 | 0 | 9 | 3 |

=== Group 5 ===
| Player | Pld | W | L | GW | GL | Pts |
|---|---|---|---|---|---|---|
| (Austria) Nina Skerbinz (11) | 3 | 3 | 0 | 9 | 2 | 6 |
| (Chinese Taipei) Chen Min-hsin (5) | 3 | 2 | 1 | 6 | 3 | 5 |
| (Romania) Andreea Baiasu (21) | 3 | 1 | 2 | 5 | 8 | 4 |
| (Ecuador) Karolayn Maldonado (26) | 3 | 0 | 3 | 2 | 9 | 3 |

=== Group 6 ===
| Player | Pld | W | L | GW | GL | Pts |
|---|---|---|---|---|---|---|
| (Germany) Koharu Itagaki (6) | 3 | 3 | 0 | 9 | 4 | 6 |
| (Portugal) Julia Leal (9) | 3 | 2 | 1 | 8 | 3 | 5 |
| (Chile) Catalina Ramirez (25) | 3 | 1 | 2 | 4 | 6 | 4 |
| (New Zealand) Anzhuo Han (23) | 3 | 0 | 3 | 1 | 9 | 3 |

=== Group 7 ===
| Player | Pld | W | L | GW | GL | Pts |
|---|---|---|---|---|---|---|
| (South Korea) Heo Yerim (7) | 3 | 3 | 0 | 9 | 3 | 6 |
| (Singapore) Loy Ming Ying (10) | 3 | 2 | 1 | 8 | 5 | 5 |
| (Tunisia) Ela Saidi (22) | 3 | 1 | 2 | 4 | 8 | 4 |
| (Australia) Daisy Xie (28) | 3 | 0 | 3 | 4 | 9 | 3 |

=== Group 8 ===
| Player | Pld | W | L | GW | GL | Pts |
|---|---|---|---|---|---|---|
| (India) Syndrela Das (8) | 3 | 3 | 0 | 9 | 0 | 6 |
| (Poland) Katarzyna Rajkowska (12) | 3 | 2 | 1 | 6 | 4 | 5 |
| (Uganda) Jemimah Nakawala (27) | 3 | 1 | 2 | 4 | 6 | 4 |
| (Ghana) Joanita Borteye (24) | 3 | 0 | 3 | 0 | 9 | 3 |

== Knockout stage ==
| Round of 16 | | | | | | | | | Quarterfinals | | | | | | | Semifinals | | Final |
| 1 | (Japan) Matsushima M. | | 11 | 11 | 9 | 11 | 8 | 11 |
| 20 | (Thailand) Vijitviriyagul K. | | 4 | 6 | 11 | 7 | 11 | 9 | 1 | (Japan) Matsushima M. | | 11 | 11 | 11 | 11 |
| 12 | (Poland) Rajkowska K. | | 11 | 2 | 8 | 11 | 12 | 11 | 12 | (Poland) Rajkowska K. | | 4 | 7 | 8 | 6 |
| 7 | (South Korea) Heo Y. | | 7 | 11 | 11 | 5 | 10 | 8 | | | | | | | | 1 | (Japan) Matsushima M. |
| 6 | (Germany) Itagaki K. | | 8 | 11 | 11 | 11 | 10 | 11 | | | | | | | | 5 | (Chinese Taipei) Chen M. H. |
| 13 | (Czech Republic) Kode H. | | 11 | 8 | 9 | 8 | 12 | 8 | 6 | (Germany) Itagaki K. | | 7 | 8 | 7 | 4 |
| 5 | (Chinese Taipei) Chen M. H. | 12 | 13 | 14 | 11 | 8 | 9 | 11 | 5 | (Chinese Taipei) Chen M. H. | | 11 | 11 | 11 | 11 |
| 3 | (China) Yao R. | 14 | 11 | 12 | 8 | 11 | 11 | 6 |
| 4 | (France) Guo Zheng N. | | | 5 | 11 | 11 | 11 | 11 |
| 9 | (Portugal) Leal J. | | | 11 | 9 | 7 | 9 | 3 | 4 | (France) Guo Zheng N. | 11 | 8 | 11 | 4 | 11 |
| 10 | (Singapore) Loy M. Y. | | | | 11 | 11 | 11 | 11 | 10 | (Singapore) Loy M. Y. | 13 | 11 | 6 | 11 | 13 |
| 8 | (India) Das S. | | | | 7 | 6 | 4 | 6 | | | | | | | | 10 | (Singapore) Loy M. Y. |
| 11 | (Austria) Skerbinz N. | 7 | 11 | 6 | 8 | 11 | 11 | 11 | | | | | | | | 2 | (Hong Kong) Su T. T. |
| 14 | (Antigua and Barbuda) Kashyap S. | 11 | 8 | 11 | 11 | 7 | 2 | 8 | 11 | (Austria) Skerbinz N. | | 6 | 9 | 1 | 9 |
| 15 | (Algeria) Morice T. | | | 2 | 8 | 11 | 3 | 4 | 2 | (Hong Kong) Su T. T. | | 11 | 11 | 11 | 11 |
| 2 | (Hong Kong) Su T. T. | | | 11 | 11 | 9 | 11 | 11 |
