= Divyansh =

Divyansh is an Indian male (divya- special, ansh- son) given name and may refer to:

- Divyansh and Manuraj, an Indian musical duo
- Divyansh Singh Panwar, an Indian sport shooter

== See also ==
- Divyansha Kaushik, Indian actress
- Divyanshi Bhowmick (born 2010), Indian table-tennis player
- Devanshi (TV series), an Indian TV series
