= Andrea McDonnell =

Australian para table tennis player

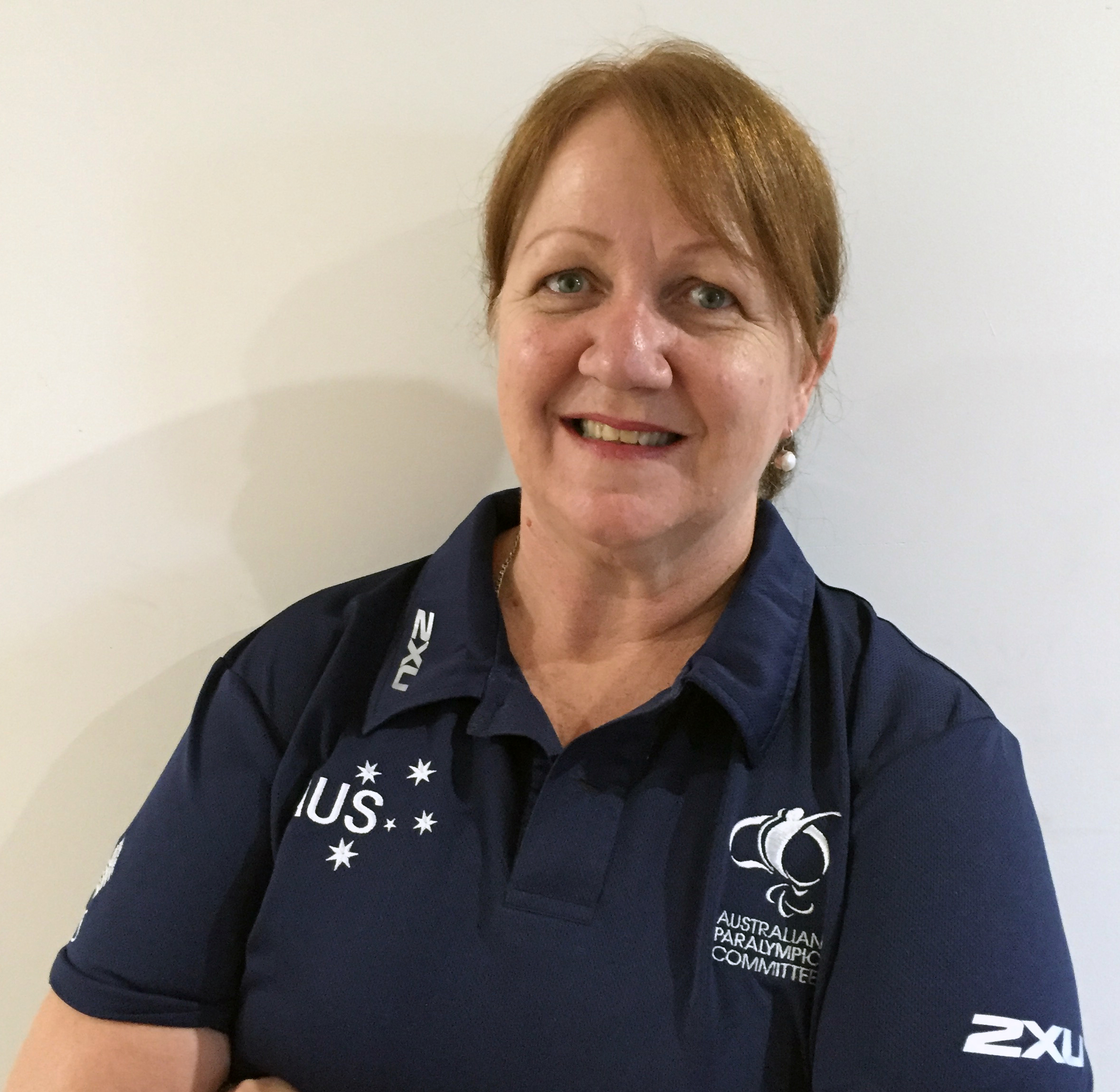
- 2016 Australian Paralympic team portrait of Andrea McDonnell

Personal information
- Nationality: Australian
- Born: 7 July 1960 (age 66)

Sport
- Country: Australia
- Sport: Table Tennis
Medal record
Women's table tennis
Representing Australia
Commonwealth Games
Bronze medal – third place	2018 Gold Coast	Singles TT6–10

Andrea McDonnell (born 7 July 1960) is an Australian Paralympic table tennis player. She competed for Australia at the 2016 Rio Paralympics.

== Personal ==
McDonnell was born on 7 July 1960. She grew up in Townsville, Queensland and is one of six children. A workplace accident left her with impaired movement in her left leg and right arm. In 2016, she lives in Ayr, Queensland and works as a financial planner.

== Table tennis ==
She is a Class 10 table tennis player. McDonnell grew up in a table tennis family with both her parents playing. She was a national junior player. She took up table tennis again after her accident. She made her debut for Australia at the 2013 Oceania Para Table Tennis Championships in Canberra. At the 2015 Oceania Para Table Tennis Championships in Bendigo, she was defeated by Melissa Tapper in the Class 6–10 final.

At the 2016 Rio Paralympics, McDonnell did not win a match in the Women's Singles Class 10 preliminaries and did not advance. In the Women's Doubles Class 6–10, McDonnell and her partner Melissa Tapper finished fourth.

She has coached her two of her nieces at junior national level.
