= 2026 ITTF-ATTU Asian Youth Championships =

Tournament details
- Dates: 28 June – 4 July 2026
- Edition: 30th
- Venue: Bangkokthonburi Hall
- Location: Bangkok, Thailand

The 2026 ITTF-ATTU Asian Youth Championships was the 30th edition of the ITTF-ATTU Asian Youth Championships (also known as Asian Junior and Cadet Table Tennis Championships), which were organised by the International Table Tennis Federation and the Asian Table Tennis Union. It was held at the Bangkokthonburi Hall in Bangkok, Thailand, from 28 June to 4 July 2026. The tournament will also serve as the Asian qualifiers for the 2026 ITTF World Youth Championships.

== Host selection ==
The hosting rights for the tournament were initially given to North Korea with Pyongyang as the host city. However, due to logistical issues, the tournament was relocated to Muscat in Oman. Ultimately, it was decided that Oman will host the 2027 edition, while Thailand got the hosting rights for this edition, with Bangkok as the host city.

== Medal Summary ==
=== Medalists ===
Under-15

Event	Gold	Silver	Bronze
Boys' singles	(South Korea) Lee Seung-soo	(Japan) Soma Ono	(Chinese Taipei) Chen Kai-cheng (China) Liu Zihang
Girls' singles	(China) Liu Ziling	(Japan) Miku Matsushima	(Japan) Yui Sakuma (Japan) Cocona Muramatsu
Boys' team	China; Chen Yizhou; Min Ming; Liu Zihang; Cui Zijun	South Korea; Kim Ryeo-won; Choi Kang-geon; Lee Seung-soo; Ma Yeong-min	Japan; Sora Okada; Shunta Harasawa; Soma Ono; Ukyo Kobayashi Chinese Taipei; Wu Yuan-kai; Fan Yi-li; Chen Kai-cheng; Lu Shih-yuan
Girls' team	Japan; Yui Sakuma; Miku Matsushima; Cocona Muramatsu; Kokomi Ishida	China; Du Hanjing; Zhou Yufei; Liu Ziling; Liu Zitong	Chinese Taipei; Sie Jhih-chen; Peng Yen-rong; Liao Yu-xian; Chen Chih-yen South Korea; Lee Yu-bin; Lee Yu-rim; Lee Hae-lin; Shin Hyo-rin

Under-19

Event	Gold	Silver	Bronze
Boys' singles	(China) Zhou Guanhong	(China) Li Hechen	(Japan) Shunto Iwaida (Japan) Kohaku Natano
Girls' singles	(China) Jiang Yiyi	(Hong Kong) Su Tsz Tung	(Japan) Mao Takamori (India) Syndrela Das
Boys' doubles	(China) Li Hechen (China) Tang Yiren	(Chinese Taipei) Hsu Hsien-chia (Chinese Taipei) Cheng Min-hsiu	(Chinese Taipei) Hung Che-yen (Chinese Taipei) Yang Hao-jen (Malaysia) Im Jin Zhen (Malaysia) Lai Yong Han
Girls' doubles	(Japan) Aoba Takahashi (Japan) Misuzu Takeya	(India) Syndrela Das (India) Divyanshi Bhowmick	(China) Yao Ruixuan (China) Jiang Yiyi (China) Yan Yutong (China) Yang Huize
Mixed doubles	(China) Li Hechen (China) Yao Ruixuan	(Thailand) Preechayan Thitaphat (Thailand) Vijitviriyagul Kulapassr	(India) Abhinandh Pradhivadhi (India) Divyanshi Bhowmick (Chinese Taipei) Yang Hao-jen (Chinese Taipei) Lu Yu-en
Boys' team	Japan; Yuta Ito; Kohaku Nakano; Shunto Iwaida; Eiki Nakashiro	China; Li Hechen; Zhou Guanhong; Tang Yiren; Zhai Jiale	India; Kushal Chopda; Priyanuj Bhattacharya; Balamurugan Rajasekaran; Abhinandh Pradhivadhi South Korea; Lee Hyeon-ho; Kwon Hyuk; Kim Dae-hwan; Oh Yu-jin
Girls' team	Japan; Aoba Takahashi; Yuna Ojio; Mao Takamori; Misuzu Takeya	China; Yang Huize; Jiang Yiyi; Yan Yutong; Yao Ruixuan	Hong Kong; Su Tsz Tung; Yuen Sum Lok; Mak Ming Shum; Wong Tsz Yui Chinese Taipei; Wu Ying-syuan; Lu Yu-en; Wu Jia-en; Chen Chi-yun

=== Medal table ===
Rank	Nation	Gold	Silver	Bronze	Total
1	China	6	4	3	13
2	Japan	4	2	6	12
3	South Korea	1	1	2	4
4	Chinese Taipei	0	1	6	7
5	India	0	1	3	4
6	Hong Kong	0	1	1	2
7	Thailand	0	1	0	1
8	Malaysia	0	0	1	1
Totals (8 entries)		11	11	22	44
