= Table tennis at the 2018 Commonwealth Games – Women's TT6–10 singles =

Table tennis – Women's TT6–10 singles at the 2018 Commonwealth Games
- Venue: Oxenford Studios
- Dates: 10 – 14 April 2018
- Competitors: 8 from 6 nations

Medalists
gold medal	Melissa Tapper	Australia
silver medal	Faith Obazuaye	Nigeria
bronze medal	Andrea McDonnell	Australia

Table tennis women's TT6–10 singles at the 2018 Commonwealth Games was held at the Oxenford Studios on the Gold Coast, Australia from 10 to 14 April.

== Group stage ==
=== Group 1 ===
Name	MP	MW	ML	GW	GL
Melissa Tapper (AUS)	3	3	0	9	0
Felicity Pickard (ENG)	3	2	1	6	3
Maitreyee Sarkar (IND)	3	1	2	3	6
Vero Nime (PNG)	3	0	3	0	9

Date		Score		Set 1	Set 2	Set 3	Set 4	Set 5
10 Apr	Melissa Tapper (AUS)	3–0	Maitreyee Sarkar (IND)	11–3	11–1	11–3		
10 Apr	Felicity Pickard (ENG)	3–0	Vero Nime (PNG)	11–0	11–2	11–2		
11 Apr	Melissa Tapper (AUS)	3–0	Felicity Pickard (ENG)	11–6	11–2	11–1		
11 Apr	Maitreyee Sarkar (IND)	3–0	Vero Nime (PNG)	11–2	11–9	11–2		
12 Apr	Felicity Pickard (ENG)	3–0	Maitreyee Sarkar (IND)	11–5	11–8	11–9		
12 Apr	Melissa Tapper (AUS)	3–0	Vero Nime (PNG)	11–2	11–5	11–3		

=== Group 2 ===
Name	MP	MW	ML	GW	GL
Faith Obazuaye (NGR)	3	3	0	9	0
Andrea McDonnell (AUS)	3	2	1	6	3
Stephanie Chan (CAN)	3	1	2	3	6
Vaishnavi Sutar (IND)	3	0	3	0	9

Date		Score		Set 1	Set 2	Set 3	Set 4	Set 5
10 Apr	Andrea McDonnell (AUS)	0–3	Faith Obazuaye (NGR)	9–11	9–11	6–11		
10 Apr	Stephanie Chan (CAN)	3–0	Vaishnavi Sutar (IND)	11–1	11–2	11–3		
11 Apr	Andrea McDonnell (AUS)	3–0	Stephanie Chan (CAN)	11–5	11–1	11–3		
11 Apr	Faith Obazuaye (NGR)	3–0	Vaishnavi Sutar (IND)	11–0	11–2	11–2		
12 Apr	Stephanie Chan (CAN)	0–3	Faith Obazuaye (NGR)	7–11	5–11	9–11		
12 Apr	Andrea McDonnell (AUS)	3–0	Vaishnavi Sutar (IND)	11–3	11–3	11–1		

== Knockout stage ==
Semifinals
Melissa Tapper (AUS)	6	11	11	11
Andrea McDonnell (AUS)	11	3	4	1
Felicity Pickard (ENG)	6	7	8
Faith Obazuaye (NGR)	11	11	11

Gold medal match
Melissa Tapper (AUS)	7	11	11	11
Faith Obazuaye (NGR)	11	2	6	3
Bronze medal match
Andrea McDonnell (AUS)	11	11	11
Felicity Pickard (ENG)	2	6	3
