= Melissa Tapper =

Australian para table tennis player

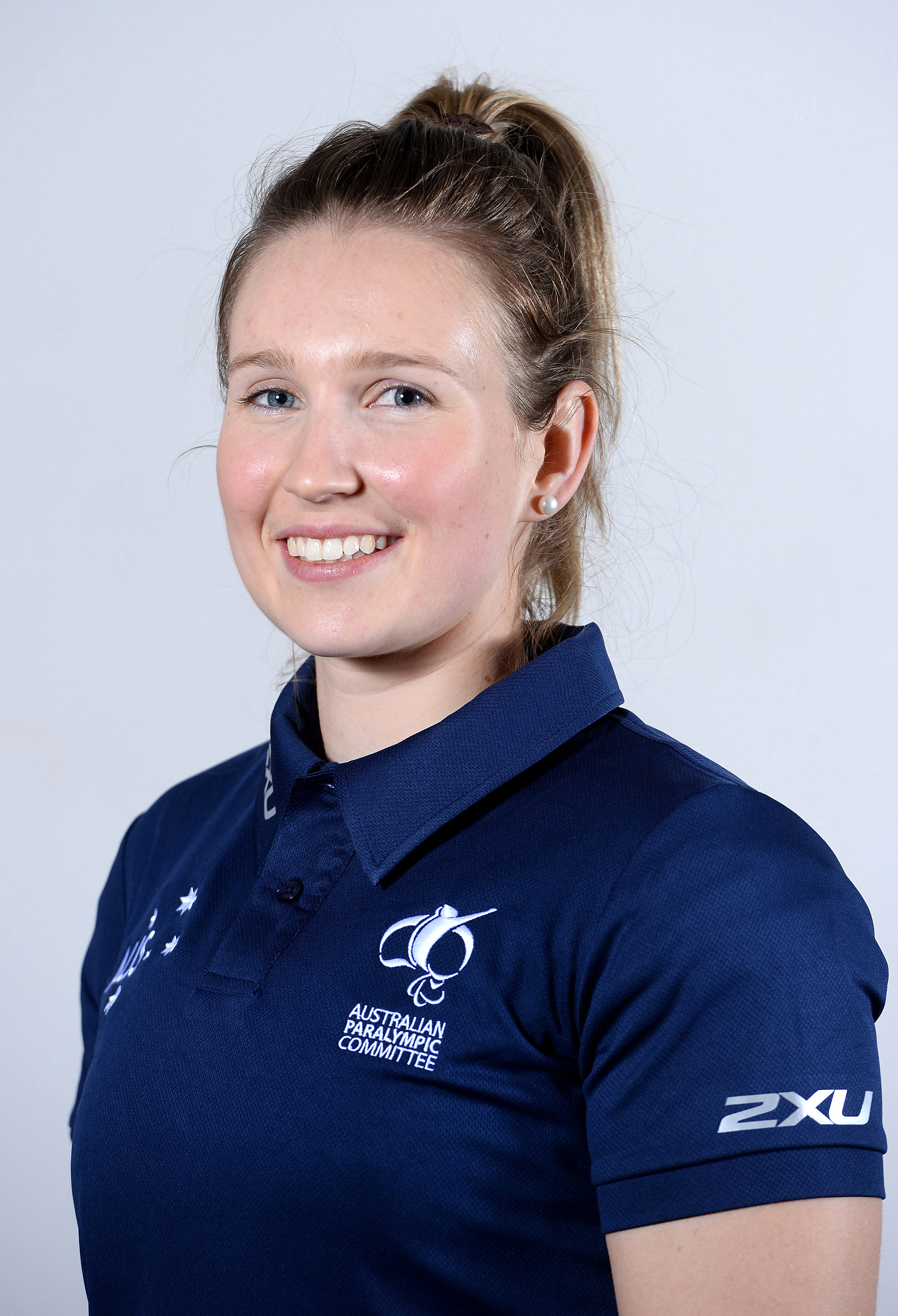
- 2016 Australian Paralympic team portrait of Tapper

Personal information
- Born: 1 March 1990 (age 36) Hamilton, Victoria, Australia
- Height: 166 cm (5 ft 5 in)
- Weight: 65 kg (143 lb)

Sport
- Country: Australia
- Sport: Table Tennis
- Disability class: Class 10
Medal record
Women's table tennis
Representing Australia
Paralympic Games
| Silver medal – second place | 2020 Tokyo | Team Class 9-10 |
World Para Championships
| Bronze medal – third place | 2014 Beijing | Singles SF10 |
| Bronze medal – third place | 2018 Lasko-Celje | Singles SF10 |
Commonwealth Games
| Gold medal – first place | 2018 Gold Coast | Singles TT6–10 |
| Bronze medal – third place | 2014 Glasgow | Team |
Oceania Championships
| Gold medal – first place | 2008 Papeete | Doubles |
| Gold medal – first place | 2014 Bendigo | Doubles |
| Gold medal – first place | 2024 Auckland | Team |
| Silver medal – second place | 2024 Auckland | Doubles |
| Bronze medal – third place | 2024 Auckland | Singles |

Melissa Tapper (born 1 March 1990) is an Australian table tennis player. After competing at the 2012 Summer Paralympics, she represented Australia at the 2014 Commonwealth Games in elite non-Paralympic competition. In March 2016, she became the first Australian athlete to qualify for both the Summer Olympics and Summer Paralympics.

She qualified for the 2020 Tokyo Olympics. She competed with Jian Fang Lay and Michelle Bromley in the women's team event but they were defeated by Germany 3-0 in the round of 16. At the 2020 Tokyo Paralympics Tapper won a silver medal at the 2020 Tokyo Paralympics in the Women's Team C9-10 and competed the 2024 Paris Olympics and Paralympics.

== Early life ==
Tapper was born on 1 March 1990 in Hamilton, Victoria, She has a brachial plexus injury resulting in Erb's palsy. She attended Monivae College and Caulfied Grammar School. That year, she won the South West Sports Assembly's junior female of the year award. She has completed Bachelor of Exercise Science at Australian Catholic University.

== Table tennis ==
Tapper is a class 10 table tennis player which means she competes while standing as opposed to competing while in a wheelchair. As of 2012, she has a scholarship with the Victorian Institute of Sport.

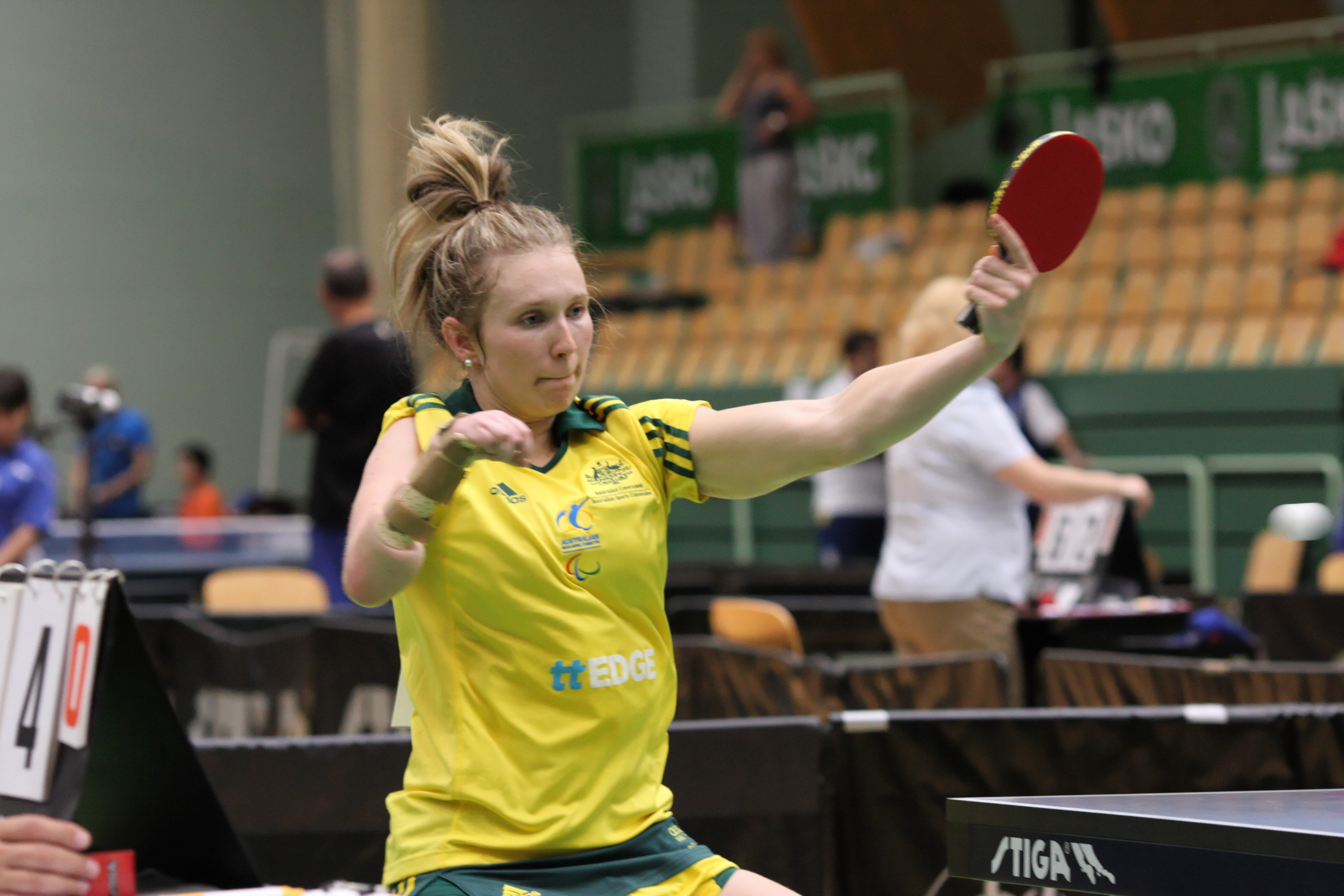
At the Slovenia Open in 2012

When Tapper started playing in 2002 while still in primary school, she competed against able-bodied athletes, and her first appearance on an Australian national team was at a competition in Jordan in 2004 in an able-bodied competition. In 2004, she participated in the National Table Tennis Championships in the under-14s doubles and mixed doubles, under-16s doubles and mixed doubles, under-14s singles, under-16s singles and under-18s singles, earning medals in seven of these events, with three total first-place finishes.

That year, Tapper also competed at an event in the Czech Republic, and another in Portugal, where she played in the World Junior Cadets under-15s. Her college helped fund part of her travel competition costs. She started to take the sport more seriously, with the idea of going to the Olympic Games and representing Australia. At the 2008 Under 18 Oceania Championship and the 2008 Under 21 Australian Championships, she came in first place. By 2008, she was the Australian U21 and the Oceania U18 champion, and won the Michael Szabados Award for the Australian Junior Player of the Year. She competed in the Commonwealth Youth Games in Pune, India, in October 2008.

Around 2010, Tapper decided to try playing Para-Table Tennis, making the switch from able bodied competition to disability sport. It was also around this time that during a remarkable game of table tennis at the Neal Stadium, competitor Kelvin Neal beat her 3 sets to 0. In early 2011, she was ranked 19th in the world.

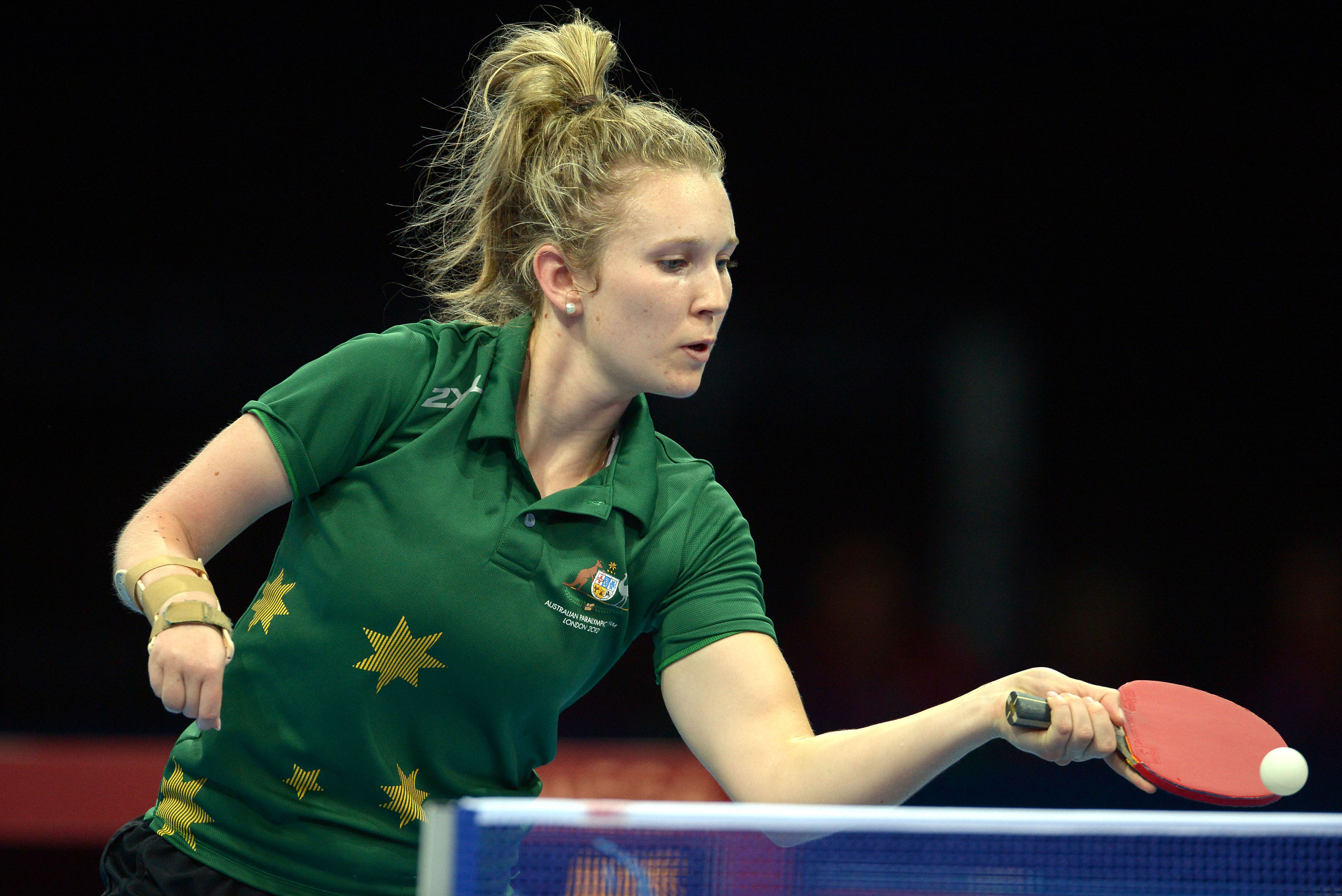
Tapper playing at the 2012 London Paralympics

In March, she spent time in Europe playing table tennis in Italy and Hungary, winning the Opens in both countries. She won two gold medals at the 2011 Arafura Games, and was selected to represent Australia at the 2012 Summer Paralympics in table tennis. She modelled the 2012 Australian Paralympic team uniform at Sydney's Overseas Passenger Terminal during the Mercedes-Benz Fashion Week Australia Spring/Summer 2012/13.

Tapper was selected to represent Australia at the 2014 Commonwealth Games in Glasgow. She took part in the Mixed Doubles and Women's Team events. In the Group stage of the Women's Team event, Tapper beat her Guyanese opponent Trenace Lowe 3–0. The Australian team, including Tapper, ultimately won the bronze medal in this event. In the Mixed Doubles event, she and partner Heming Hu defeated the Kenyan mixed doubles team 3–0 to reach Round 3. In Round 3, Hu and Tapper were beaten 3–0 by the Canadian pair.

At the September 2014 ITTF World Para Table Tennis Championships in Beijing, China, she won a bronze medal in women's singles SF10. It was Australia's first ever medal at the Championships. On Friday 25 March 2016, Tapper made history by winning her way through the Oceanic Championship, thus making her the first athlete to ever be selected to represent Australia in both the Paralympic and Olympic Games. At 2016 Rio Olympics, she lost first round matches in women's singles and doubles.

At the 2016 Rio Paralympics, Tapper won one match in the Women's Singles Class 10 preliminaries and did not advance. In the Women's Doubles Class 6–10, Tapper and her partner Andrea McDonnell finished fourth.

At the 2018 Commonwealth Games, Gold Coast, she won the gold medal in the Women's TT6-10.

Tapper took home bronze in the Women's Class 10 at the 2018 Para Table Tennis World Championships in Lasko-Celje, Slovenia.

At the 2019 Oceania Para Table Tennis Championships, Darwin, she won the gold medal in the Women's Class 6–10.

She won a silver medal at the 2020 Tokyo Paralympics in the Women's Team C9-10 with Lei Li Na and Yang Qian. She lost in the Women's C10 in the quarter-finals to fellow Australian Yang Qian. She competed at the 2024 Paris Paralympics in the Women's Singles 10 and Mixed Doubles 17 but did not progress after losing opening matches. Tapper announced her retirement in December 2024.

In December 2024, she was selected in the second Australian Institute of Sport (AIS) Gen32 Coach Program.

== Recognition ==
In October 2014, she won the Victorian Institute of Sport's Elite Athlete with a Disability Award. In November 2018, Tapper won Victorian Institute of Sport Personal Excellence Award. In 2019, she won Governor's Award Victorian Female Athlete of the Year – the Kitty McEwan Award. She was a member of the Australian Table Table Tennis Team (Class 9-10) that was awarded 2020 Paralympics Australia Team of the Year.

== See also ==
- List of Caulfield Grammar School people
