= Table tennis at the 2025 Asian Youth Games =

- Venue: Exhibition World Bahrain
- Dates: 26–30 October 2025

Table tennis at the 2025 Asian Youth Games was held in Exhibition World Bahrain, Sakhir, Bahrain between 26 and 30 October 2025.

== Medalists ==
Event	Gold	Silver	Bronze
Boys' singles	Tang Yiren; China	Li Hechen; China	Lee Seung-soo; South Korea
Boys' singles	Tang Yiren; China	Li Hechen; China	Benyamin Faraji; Iran
Girls' singles	Yao Ruixuan; China	Hu Yi; China	Wei Jingming; China
Girls' singles	Yao Ruixuan; China	Hu Yi; China	Lin Wan-rong; Chinese Taipei
Mixed doubles	China; Li Hechen; Yao Ruixuan	China; Tang Yiren; Hu Yi	India; Sarthak Arya; Syndrela Das
Mixed doubles	China; Li Hechen; Yao Ruixuan	China; Tang Yiren; Hu Yi	Hong Kong; Li Ki Ho; Mak Ming Shum

== Medal table ==
Rank	Nation	Gold	Silver	Bronze	Total
1	China (CHN)	3	3	1	7
2	Chinese Taipei (TPE)	0	0	1	1
2	Hong Kong (HKG)	0	0	1	1
2	India (IND)	0	0	1	1
2	Iran (IRI)	0	0	1	1
2	South Korea (KOR)	0	0	1	1
Totals (6 entries)		3	3	6	12

== Results ==
=== Boys' singles ===
==== Group play ====
26–27 October

Group A
Pos	Athlete	Pld	W	L	Pts	KOR	BRN	MDV
1	Lee Seung-soo (KOR)	2	2	0	4	—	3–0	3–0
2	Ali Mohamed (BRN)	2	1	1	3	2, 4, 2	—	3–0
3	Muhammad Aal Imran (MDV)	2	0	2	2	4, 1, 5	3, 11, 3	—

Group B
Pos	Athlete	Pld	W	L	Pts	IRI	CAM	MGL
1	Benyamin Faraji (IRI)	2	2	0	4	—	3–0	3–0
2	Lamkimna Sisuchhada (CAM)	2	1	1	3	3, 3, 11	—	3–0
3	Dügersürengiin Törmönkh (MGL)	2	0	2	2	3, 2, 2	4, 3, 5	—

Group C
Pos	Athlete	Pld	W	L	Pts	CHN	QAT	KUW
1	Li Hechen (CHN)	2	2	0	4	—	3–0	3–0
2	Essa Al-Haddad (QAT)	2	1	1	3	4, 1, 1	—	3–1
3	Barrak Al-Tourah (KUW)	2	0	2	2	2, 3, 4	−10, 6, 6, 8	—

Group D
Pos	Athlete	Pld	W	L	Pts	JPN	LAO	MDV
1	Shunto Iwaida (JPN)	2	2	0	4	—	3–0	3–0
2	Phongsavanh Sengmany (LAO)	2	1	1	3	3, 6, 8	—	3–0
3	Mohamed Khalaf Rafiu (MDV)	2	0	2	2	7, 3, 2	3, 8, 3	—

Group E
Pos	Athlete	Pld	W	L	Pts	TPE	LBN	BRN
1	Lin Chin-ting (TPE)	2	2	0	4	—	3–0	3–0
2	Michel Abi Nader (LBN)	2	1	1	3	3, 6, 2	—	3–0
3	Adam Teraif (BRN)	2	0	2	2	4, 3, 5	9, 4, 7	—

Group F
Pos	Athlete	Pld	W	L	Pts	CHN	THA	KUW
1	Zhou Guanhong (CHN)	2	2	0	4	—	3–0	3–0
2	Kantanut Petsunthad (THA)	2	1	1	3	11, 5, 7	—	3–0
3	Bader Al-Houti (KUW)	2	0	2	2	3, 1, 3	9, 8, 5	—

Group G
Pos	Athlete	Pld	W	L	Pts	CHN	PHI	SYR
1	Tang Yiren (CHN)	2	2	0	4	—	3–0	3–0
2	Jacob Quindo (PHI)	2	1	1	3	6, 4, 5	—	3–2
3	Ammar Al-Kassab (SYR)	2	0	2	2	3, 5, 3	12, 8, −5, −5, 7	—

Group H
Pos	Athlete	Pld	W	L	Pts	KOR	KSA	LBN
1	Ma Yeong-min (KOR)	2	2	0	4	—	3–0	3–0
2	Abdulrahman Al-Taher (KSA)	2	1	1	3	7, 2, 4	—	3–0
3	Ramez Al-Dakdouki (LBN)	2	0	2	2	2, 0, 4	1, 5, 5	—

Group I
Pos	Athlete	Pld	W	L	Pts	HKG	INA	KAZ
1	Li Ki Ho (HKG)	2	2	0	4	—	3–0	3–0
2	Jason Christian (INA)	2	1	1	3	7, 6, 8	—	3–2
3	Bakdaulet Saurbay (KAZ)	2	0	2	2	4, 9, 3	−9, 9, 8, −9, 6	—

Group J
Pos	Athlete	Pld	W	L	Pts	THA	UAE	KUW
1	Thitaphat Preechayan (THA)	2	2	0	4	—	3–0	3–0
2	Ahmed Saeed Al-Musaibi (UAE)	2	1	1	3	5, 7, 5	—	3–0
3	Talal Al-Bader (KUW)	2	0	2	2	2, 2, 4	7, 5, 7	—

Group K
Pos	Athlete	Pld	W	L	Pts	HKG	IND	PHI
1	William Man (HKG)	2	2	0	4	—	3–1	3–0
2	Sarthak Arya (IND)	2	1	1	3	11, 9, −8, 15	—	3–1
3	Nazlem John Marin (PHI)	2	0	2	2	10, 9, 11	8, 8, −7, 7	—

Group L
Pos	Athlete	Pld	W	L	Pts	IRI	PHI	UAE
1	Mobin Amiri (IRI)	2	2	0	4	—	3–1	3–1
2	Emmanuel Paculba (PHI)	2	1	1	3	−5, 8, 12, 9	—	3–2
3	Ali Al-Hawai (UAE)	2	0	2	2	−9, 3, 6, 12	7, −8, −11, 4, 5	—

Group M
Pos	Athlete	Pld	W	L	Pts	HKG	KSA	YEM
1	Lo Ka Kit (HKG)	2	2	0	4	—	3–1	3–0
2	Saud Al-Taher (KSA)	2	1	1	3	−9, 6, 8, 4	—	3–0
3	Wesam Bakhah (YEM)	2	0	2	2	3, 4, 4	5, 5, 3	—

Group N
Pos	Athlete	Pld	W	L	Pts	MAS	INA	BAN
1	Tey Hong Yu (MAS)	2	2	0	4	—	3–1	3–0
2	Zeldan Jabal Tharikh (INA)	2	1	1	3	−9, 11, 8, 9	—	3–0
3	Abul Hashem Hasib (BAN)	2	0	2	2	8, 13, 8	8, 9, 4	—

Group O
Pos	Athlete	Pld	W	L	Pts	IND	MGL	BRN
1	Ritvik Gupta (IND)	2	2	0	4	—	3–0	3–0
2	Ankhbayaryn Bilgüün (MGL)	2	1	1	3	2, 3, 10	—	3–2
3	Majed Hashem (BRN)	2	0	2	2	5, 8, 7	−7, 9, −9, 7, 5	—

Group P
Pos	Athlete	Pld	W	L	Pts	TPE	SGP	YEM
1	Yu Yi-cing (TPE)	2	2	0	4	—	3–0	3–0
2	Tristen Yee (SGP)	2	1	1	3	5, 5, 8	—	3–0
3	Aiman Al-Maflehi (YEM)	2	0	2	2	0, 2, 2	3, 5, 6	—

Group Q
Pos	Athlete	Pld	W	L	Pts	IND	QAT	MDV
1	Sahil Rawat (IND)	2	2	0	4	—	3–1	3–0
2	Abdulaziz Al-Abdulla (QAT)	2	1	1	3	6, 5, −12, 3	—	3–0
3	Alyaan Ali Nisham (MDV)	2	0	2	2	3, 3, 1	10, 6, 3	—

Group R
Pos	Athlete	Pld	W	L	Pts	SGP	QAT	CAM
1	Benaiah Seah (SGP)	2	2	0	4	—	3–2	3–0
2	Yousif Abdalla (QAT)	2	1	1	3	9, −6, −9, 5, 6	—	3–0
3	To Kim Joe (CAM)	2	0	2	2	3, 2, 3	8, 8, 4	—

Group S
Pos	Athlete	Pld	W	L	Pts	THA	SGP	BAN	YEM
1	Nimit Soiphuang (THA)	3	3	0	6	—	3–1	3–0	3–0
2	Benjamin Lau (SGP)	3	2	1	5	−7, 11, 9, 9	—	3–0	3–0
3	Mahtabur Rahman Mahi (BAN)	3	1	2	4	4, 3, 7	3, 2, 5	—	3–0
4	Abdulrahman Shabil (YEM)	3	0	3	3	4, 5, 8	5, 5, 4	4, 6, 5	—

Source: Official website

==== Knockout round ====
Round of 64 – 28 October
Ankhbayaryn Bilgüün (MGL)	2–3 (12–10, 7–11, 4–11, 11–9, 4–11)	Zeldan Jabal Tharikh (INA)
Lamkimna Sisuchhada (CAM)	3–1 (11–13, 11–7, 11–5, 11–5)	Essa Al-Haddad (QAT)
Michel Abi Nader (LBN)	0–3 (9–11, 4–11, 4–11)	Abdulrahman Al-Taher (KSA)
Yousif Abdalla (QAT)	0–3 (7–11, 8–11, 7–11)	Emmanuel Paculba (PHI)
Phongsavanh Sengmany (LAO)	2–3 (11–3, 11–13, 9–11, 11–6, 7–11)	Kantanut Petsunthad (THA)
Abdulaziz Al-Abdulla (QAT)	3–2 (10–12, 11–7, 9–11, 11–7, 13–11)	Ali Mohamed (BRN)

Round of 32 – 28 October
Lee Seung-soo (KOR)	3–1 (9–11, 11–8, 11–5, 11–5)	Ahmed Saeed Al-Musaibi (UAE)
Zeldan Jabal Tharikh (INA)	0–3 (6–11, 5–11, 9–11)	Yu Yi-cing (TPE)
Li Ki Ho (HKG)	3–2 (5–11, 10–12, 11–9, 11–7, 11–4)	Nimit Soiphuang (THA)
Sarthak Arya (IND)	0–3 (5–11, 8–11, 7–11)	Zhou Guanhong (CHN)
Tang Yiren (CHN)	3–0 (11–2, 11–2, 11–8)	Lamkimna Sisuchhada (CAM)
Sahil Rawat (IND)	2–3 (13–15, 5–11, 11–4, 16–14, 9–11)	Mobin Amiri (IRI)
Lo Ka Kit (HKG)	3–1 (4–11, 11–8, 11–5, 11–9)	Benaiah Seah (SGP)
Abdulrahman Al-Taher (KSA)	0–3 (5–11, 5–11, 6–11)	Shunto Iwaida (JPN)
Li Hechen (CHN)	3–0 (11–1, 11–5, 11–2)	Emmanuel Paculba (PHI)
Jason Christian (INA)	0–3 (6–11, 5–11, 6–11)	Ritvik Gupta (IND)
Tey Hong Yu (MAS)	3–2 (8–11, 11–4, 11–8, 6–11, 11–6)	Benjamin Lau (SGP)
Kantanut Petsunthad (THA)	0–3 (7–11, 6–11, 11–13)	Lin Chin-ting (TPE)
Ma Yeong-min (KOR)	3–2 (11–6, 11–5, 7–11, 7–11, 11–2)	Saud Al-Taher (KSA)
Tristen Yee (SGP)	1–3 (9–11, 11–8, 3–11, 10–12)	Thitaphat Preechayan (THA)
William Man (HKG)	3–1 (11–5, 11–4, 9–11, 11–3)	Abdulaziz Al-Abdulla (QAT)
Jacob Quindo (PHI)	0–3 (4–11, 2–11, 5–11)	Benyamin Faraji (IRI)

Round of 16; 29 October
Lee Seung-soo (KOR)	10	11	7	14	12
Yu Yi-cing (TPE)	12	7	11	12	10
Li Ki Ho (HKG)	11	6	9	11	5
Zhou Guanhong (CHN)	9	11	11	9	11
Tang Yiren (CHN)	12	11	11
Mobin Amiri (IRI)	10	7	6
Lo Ka Kit (HKG)	6	9	9
Shunto Iwaida (JPN)	11	11	11
Li Hechen (CHN)	11	11	9	11
Ritvik Gupta (IND)	9	5	11	9
Tey Hong Yu (MAS)	11	5	11	5	4
Lin Chin-ting (TPE)	8	11	6	11	11
Ma Yeong-min (KOR)	11	12	11
Thitaphat Preechayan (THA)	2	10	5
William Man (HKG)	11	9	5
Benyamin Faraji (IRI)	13	11	11

Quarterfinals; 29 October
Lee Seung-soo (KOR)	12	15	14	12
Zhou Guanhong (CHN)	10	13	16	10
Tang Yiren (CHN)	11	11	13	15
Shunto Iwaida (JPN)	3	7	15	13
Li Hechen (CHN)	11	11	11
Lin Chin-ting (TPE)	9	2	5
Ma Yeong-min (KOR)	8	8	7
Benyamin Faraji (IRI)	11	11	11

Semifinals; 30 October
Lee Seung-soo (KOR)	7	11	11	11	9	8	7
Tang Yiren (CHN)	11	9	5	6	11	11	11
Li Hechen (CHN)	14	11	12	11
Benyamin Faraji (IRI)	12	4	10	5

Gold medal match 30 October
Tang Yiren (CHN)	11	17	11	12
Li Hechen (CHN)	4	15	3	10

=== Girls' singles ===
==== Group play ====
26–27 October

Group A
Pos	Athlete	Pld	W	L	Pts	KOR	BAN	YEM
1	Heo Ye-rim (KOR)	2	2	0	4	—	3–0	3–0
2	Asma Khatun (BAN)	2	1	1	3	4, 2, 1	—	3–0
3	Asia Jamil (YEM)	2	0	2	2	1, 1, 3	2, 4, 3	—

Group B
Pos	Athlete	Pld	W	L	Pts	HKG	PHI	CAM
1	Su Tsz Tung (HKG)	2	2	0	4	—	3–0	3–0
2	Zuri Chua (PHI)	2	1	1	3	1, 3, 2	—	3–0
3	Huon Muy Yi (CAM)	2	0	2	2	1, 2, 6	7, 6, 9	—

Group C
Pos	Athlete	Pld	W	L	Pts	TPE	MGL	MDV
1	Wu Ying-syuan (TPE)	2	2	0	4	—	3–0	3–0
2	Batmönkhiin Bolor-Egshiglen (MGL)	2	1	1	3	5, 1, 4	—	3–1
3	Aishath Alsaa Nafiz (MDV)	2	0	2	2	2, 0, 2	−5, 10, 9, 10	—

Group D
Pos	Athlete	Pld	W	L	Pts	IND	CHN	LAO
1	Divyanshi Bhowmick (IND)	2	2	0	4	—	3–0	3–0
2	Wei Jingming (CHN)	2	1	1	3	2, 5, 5	—	3–0
3	Thipphachanh Xaiphetvong (LAO)	2	0	2	2	4, 5, 1	1, 1, 3	—

Group E
Pos	Athlete	Pld	W	L	Pts	IND	THA	INA
1	Syndrela Das (IND)	2	2	0	4	—	3–2	3–0
2	Panita Vijittham (THA)	2	1	1	3	−4, −16, 3, 8, 4	—	3–1
3	Diska Anindia Susanto (INA)	2	0	2	2	3, 6, 9	−10, 7, 10, 4	—

Group F
Pos	Athlete	Pld	W	L	Pts	CHN	INA	LBN
1	Hu Yi (CHN)	2	2	0	4	—	3–0	3–0
2	Oktavia Kirana Dewi (INA)	2	1	1	3	4, 7, 7	—	3–0
3	Bissan Chiri (LBN)	2	0	2	2	4, 4, 3	5, 6, 5	—

Group G
Pos	Athlete	Pld	W	L	Pts	SGP	PHI	KUW
1	Loy Ming Ying (SGP)	2	2	0	4	—	3–0	3–0
2	Jannaj Alarcon (PHI)	2	1	1	3	3, 5, 2	—	3–0
3	Fatmah Al-Shammari (KUW)	2	0	2	2	3, 1, 1	8, 8, 6	—

Group H
Pos	Athlete	Pld	W	L	Pts	KOR	LBN	BAN
1	Choi Seo-yeon (KOR)	2	2	0	4	—	3–0	3–0
2	Yasmina El-Habech (LBN)	2	1	1	3	6, 4, 9	—	3–1
3	Musrat Jannat Sigma (BAN)	2	0	2	2	3, 3, 3	21, −10, 7, 7	—

Group I
Pos	Athlete	Pld	W	L	Pts	JPN	THA	BRN
1	Aoba Takahashi (JPN)	2	2	0	4	—	3–0	3–0
2	Chisa Cachamit (THA)	2	1	1	3	5, 8, 7	—	3–0
3	Rayan Emad Rashed (BRN)	2	0	2	2	2, 1, 3	5, 4, 7	—

Group J
Pos	Athlete	Pld	W	L	Pts	CHN	SGP	BRN
1	Yao Ruixuan (CHN)	2	2	0	4	—	3–0	3–0
2	Chong Zi Sian (SGP)	2	1	1	3	5, 2, 2	—	3–0
3	Dana Al-Khayyat (BRN)	2	0	2	2	2, 3, 2	5, 4, 11	—

Group K
Pos	Athlete	Pld	W	L	Pts	SYR	THA	UAE
1	Hend Zaza (SYR)	2	2	0	4	—	3–2	WO
2	Kulapassr Vijitviriyagul (THA)	2	1	1	3	−6, 6, 10, −10, 8	—	WO
3	Meerah Malaleih (UAE)	2	0	2	0			—

Group L
Pos	Athlete	Pld	W	L	Pts	TPE	KSA	CAM
1	Lin Wan-rong (TPE)	2	2	0	4	—	3–0	3–0
2	Nihal Al-Qahtani (KSA)	2	1	1	3	9, 4, 6	—	3–0
3	Ngo Sokun Thyda (CAM)	2	0	2	2	8, 3, 3	4, 4, 5	—

Group M
Pos	Athlete	Pld	W	L	Pts	HKG	PHI	MDV
1	Mak Ming Shum (HKG)	2	2	0	4	—	3–0	3–0
2	Joanna Esguerra (PHI)	2	1	1	3	6, 5, 4	—	3–0
3	Mishka Binthi Muizzu (MDV)	2	0	2	2	1, 5, 2	6, 8, 2	—

Group N
Pos	Athlete	Pld	W	L	Pts	IRI	MAS	UAE	YEM
1	Vania Yavari (IRI)	3	3	0	6	—	3–1	3–0	3–0
2	Cheah Yu Zheng (MAS)	3	2	1	5	−6, 7, 7, 7	—	3–0	3–0
3	Mariam Yaaqeib (UAE)	3	1	2	4	2, 0, 5	3, 1, 3	—	3–2
4	Raghad Al-Dubai (YEM)	3	0	3	3	0, 1, 2	0, 3, 1	11, −16, −8, 8, 2	—

Group O
Pos	Athlete	Pld	W	L	Pts	HKG	SGP	MGL	SYR
1	Wong Tsz Yui (HKG)	3	3	0	6	—	3–0	3–0	3–0
2	Janelle Chiang (SGP)	3	2	1	5	6, 7, 7	—	3–0	3–0
3	Tüvshinbayaryn Enkhjin (MGL)	3	1	2	4	8, 6, 3	6, 5, 7	—	3–0
4	Sara Wasouf (SYR)	3	0	3	3	6, 2, 8	3, 5, 3	5, 7, 11	—

Group P
Pos	Athlete	Pld	W	L	Pts	IND	KAZ	MDV	YEM
1	Hansini Mathan (IND)	3	3	0	6	—	3–0	3–0	3–0
2	Darya Fu (KAZ)	3	2	1	5	5, 8, 4	—	3–0	3–0
3	Amina Aayaath Adam (MDV)	3	1	2	4	1, 8, 3	4, 6, 7	—	3–0
4	Raghad Jamil (YEM)	3	0	3	3	2, 1, 1	1, 2, 2	5, 8, 7	—

Source: Official website

==== Knockout round ====
Round of 32 – 28 October
Heo Ye-rim (KOR)	3–0 (11–2, 11–2, 11–2)	Joanna Esguerra (PHI)
Jannaj Alarcon (PHI)	0–3 (2–11, 6–11, 7–11)	Hend Zaza (SYR)
Wong Tsz Yui (HKG)	3–0 (11–6, 11–4, 11–5)	Yasmina El-Habech (LBN)
Nihal Al-Qahtani (KSA)	0–3 (3–11, 4–11, 7–11)	Hu Yi (CHN)
Syndrela Das (IND)	3–0 (11–2, 11–0, 11–5)	Darya Fu (KAZ)
Wei Jingming (CHN)	3–1 (8–11, 11–6, 11–4, 11–7)	Aoba Takahashi (JPN)
Vania Yavari (IRI)	3–0 (11–5, 11–2, 11–4)	Zuri Chua (PHI)
Chong Zi Sian (SGP)	2–3 (11–6, 3–11, 12–10, 6–11, 12–14)	Wu Ying-syuan (TPE)
Divyanshi Bhowmick (IND)	3–0 (11–7, 11–6, 11–4)	Panita Vijittham (THA)
Oktavia Kirana Dewi (INA)	0–3 (4–11, 7–11, 4–11)	Lin Wan-rong (TPE)
Mak Ming Shum (HKG)	3–0 (11–7, 11–6, 11–7)	Chisa Cachamit (THA)
Asma Khatun (BAN)	0–3 (4–11, 4–11, 3–11)	Loy Ming Ying (SGP)
Choi Seo-yeon (KOR)	3–0 (11–3, 11–7, 11–8)	Cheah Yu Zheng (MAS)
Batmönkhiin Bolor-Egshiglen (MGL)	1–3 (5–11, 11–7, 6–11, 7–11)	Hansini Mathan (IND)
Yao Ruixuan (CHN)	3–1 (11–3, 7–11, 11–9, 11–5)	Kulapassr Vijitviriyagul (THA)
Janelle Chiang (SGP)	0–3 (6–11, 8–11, 6–11)	Su Tsz Tung (HKG)

Round of 16; 29 October
Heo Ye-rim (KOR)	11	11	11
Hend Zaza (SYR)	8	7	2
Wong Tsz Yui (HKG)	5	2	12	5
Hu Yi (CHN)	11	11	10	11
Syndrela Das (IND)	8	11	9	12	4
Wei Jingming (CHN)	11	9	11	10	11
Vania Yavari (IRI)	12	7	2	2
Wu Ying-syuan (TPE)	10	11	11	11
Divyanshi Bhowmick (IND)	6	11	6	11	16
Lin Wan-rong (TPE)	11	8	11	7	18
Mak Ming Shum (HKG)	11	11	9	3
Loy Ming Ying (SGP)	5	13	11	11
Choi Seo-yeon (KOR)	11	11	9	10	11
Hansini Mathan (IND)	6	6	11	12	7
Yao Ruixuan (CHN)	11	11	4	11
Su Tsz Tung (HKG)	5	5	11	5

Quarterfinals; 29 October
Heo Ye-rim (KOR)	8	4	11	5
Hu Yi (CHN)	11	11	5	11
Wei Jingming (CHN)	11	11	11
Wu Ying-syuan (TPE)	9	8	5
Lin Wan-rong (TPE)	6	11	10	11	19
Loy Ming Ying (SGP)	11	5	12	8	17
Choi Seo-yeon (KOR)	12	7	10
Yao Ruixuan (CHN)	14	11	12

Semifinals; 30 October
Hu Yi (CHN)	9	13	11	11	16	11
Wei Jingming (CHN)	11	11	5	1	18	4
Lin Wan-rong (TPE)	12	7	11	10	9	8
Yao Ruixuan (CHN)	10	11	9	12	11	11

Gold medal match 30 October
Hu Yi (CHN)	7	2	11	9	11	12	11
Yao Ruixuan (CHN)	11	11	6	11	5	10	13

=== Mixed doubles ===
Round of 64 – 26 October
Zeldan Jabal Tharikh (INA); Oktavia Kirana Dewi (INA)	3–0 (11–7, 11–9, 11–4)	Ammar Al-Kassab (SYR); Hend Zaza (SYR)
Phongsavanh Sengmany (LAO); Thipphachanh Xaiphetvong (LAO)	3–0 (11–6, 11–6, 11–3)	Wesam Bakhah (YEM); Asia Jamil (YEM)
Ali Mohamed (BRN); Rayan Emad Rashed (BRN)	0–3 (9–11, 7–11, 10–12)	Abul Hashem Hasib (BAN); Asma Khatun (BAN)
Abdulrahman Al-Taher (KSA); Nihal Al-Qahtani (KSA)	1–3 (8–11, 11–6, 5–11, 9–11)	To Kim Joe (CAM); Ngo Sokun Thyda (CAM)
Nazlem John Marin (PHI); Jannaj Alarcon (PHI)	3–0 (11–7, 12–10, 11–3)	Dügersürengiin Törmönkh (MGL); Tüvshinbayaryn Enkhjin (MGL)
Bader Al-Houti (KUW); Fatmah Al-Shammari (KUW)	2–3 (15–13, 7–11, 5–11, 15–13, 9–11)	Michel Abi Nader (LBN); Bissan Chiri (LBN)
Mahtabur Rahman Mahi (BAN); Musrat Jannat Sigma (BAN)	0–3 (6–11, 1–11, 2–11)	Jason Christian (INA); Diska Anindia Susanto (INA)
Ankhbayaryn Bilgüün (MGL); Batmönkhiin Bolor-Egshiglen (MGL)	3–0 (11–5, 11–3, 11–8)	Ali Al-Hawai (UAE); Mariam Yaaqeib (UAE)
Lamkimna Sisuchhada (CAM); Huon Muy Yi (CAM)	3–0 (11–7, 11–6, 11–9)	Abdulrahman Shabil (YEM); Raghad Jamil (YEM)

Round of 32 – 27 October
Lin Chin-ting (TPE); Wu Ying-syuan (TPE)	3–2 (11–8, 7–11, 12–14, 11–8, 11–1)	Zeldan Jabal Tharikh (INA); Oktavia Kirana Dewi (INA)
Phongsavanh Sengmany (LAO); Thipphachanh Xaiphetvong (LAO)	0–3 (3–11, 5–11, 5–11)	Tang Yiren (CHN); Hu Yi (CHN)
Benjamin Lau (SGP); Loy Ming Ying (SGP)	3–1 (11–5, 14–16, 11–4, 11–7)	Abul Hashem Hasib (BAN); Asma Khatun (BAN)
To Kim Joe (CAM); Ngo Sokun Thyda (CAM)	0–3 (8–11, 6–11, 5–11)	Lo Ka Kit (HKG); Su Tsz Tung (HKG)
Lee Seung-soo (KOR); Heo Ye-rim (KOR)	WO	Ahmed Saeed Al-Musaibi (UAE); Meerah Malaleih (UAE)
Nazlem John Marin (PHI); Jannaj Alarcon (PHI)	2–3 (6–11, 11–6, 7–11, 11–8, 6–11)	Bakdaulet Saurbay (KAZ); Darya Fu (KAZ)
Nimit Soiphuang (THA); Chisa Cachamit (THA)	3–0 (11–8, 11–9, 11–3)	Michel Abi Nader (LBN); Bissan Chiri (LBN)
Mohamed Khalaf Rafiu (MDV); Aishath Alsaa Nafiz (MDV)	0–3 (6–11, 3–11, 4–11)	Sarthak Arya (IND); Syndrela Das (IND)
Ma Yeong-min (KOR); Choi Seo-yeon (KOR)	2–3 (5–11, 11–7, 11–7, 3–11, 4–11)	Shunto Iwaida (JPN); Aoba Takahashi (JPN)
Muhammad Aal Imran (MDV); Amina Aayaath Adam (MDV)	0–3 (5–11, 5–11, 4–11)	Ritvik Gupta (IND); Divyanshi Bhowmick (IND)
Tey Hong Yu (MAS); Cheah Yu Zheng (MAS)	3–2 (7–11, 9–11, 11–8, 11–9, 11–6)	Jason Christian (INA); Diska Anindia Susanto (INA)
Majed Hashem (BRN); Dana Al-Khayyat (BRN)	0–3 (5–11, 1–11, 4–11)	Li Hechen (CHN); Yao Ruixuan (CHN)
Thitaphat Preechayan (THA); Kulapassr Vijitviriyagul (THA)	3–0 (11–5, 11–9, 11–6)	Emmanuel Paculba (PHI); Joanna Esguerra (PHI)
Ramez Al-Dakdouki (LBN); Yasmina El-Habech (LBN)	0–3 (1–11, 7–11, 8–11)	Benaiah Seah (SGP); Janelle Chiang (SGP)
Yu Yi-cing (TPE); Lin Wan-rong (TPE)	3–0 (11–4, 11–8, 12–10)	Ankhbayaryn Bilgüün (MGL); Batmönkhiin Bolor-Egshiglen (MGL)
Lamkimna Sisuchhada (CAM); Huon Muy Yi (CAM)	0–3 (6–11, 11–13, 7–11)	Li Ki Ho (HKG); Mak Ming Shum (HKG)

Round of 16; 27 October
Lin Chin-ting (TPE); Wu Ying-syuan (TPE)	14	3	8	11	8
Tang Yiren (CHN); Hu Yi (CHN)	12	11	11	9	11
Benjamin Lau (SGP); Loy Ming Ying (SGP)	2	4	11	11	11
Lo Ka Kit (HKG); Su Tsz Tung (HKG)	11	11	7	2	4
Lee Seung-soo (KOR); Heo Ye-rim (KOR)	11	11	11
Bakdaulet Saurbay (KAZ); Darya Fu (KAZ)	6	2	2
Nimit Soiphuang (THA); Chisa Cachamit (THA)	6	7	3
Sarthak Arya (IND); Syndrela Das (IND)	11	11	11
Shunto Iwaida (JPN); Aoba Takahashi (JPN)	10	11	7	10
Ritvik Gupta (IND); Divyanshi Bhowmick (IND)	12	4	11	12
Tey Hong Yu (MAS); Cheah Yu Zheng (MAS)	8	5	6
Li Hechen (CHN); Yao Ruixuan (CHN)	11	11	11
Thitaphat Preechayan (THA); Kulapassr Vijitviriyagul (THA)	10	10	11	11	7
Benaiah Seah (SGP); Janelle Chiang (SGP)	12	12	7	0	11
Yu Yi-cing (TPE); Lin Wan-rong (TPE)	5	9	8
Li Ki Ho (HKG); Mak Ming Shum (HKG)	11	11	11

Quarterfinals; 28 October
Tang Yiren (CHN); Hu Yi (CHN)	11	11	11
Benjamin Lau (SGP); Loy Ming Ying (SGP)	4	6	4
Lee Seung-soo (KOR); Heo Ye-rim (KOR)	13	5	10	13	9
Sarthak Arya (IND); Syndrela Das (IND)	11	11	12	11	11
Ritvik Gupta (IND); Divyanshi Bhowmick (IND)	7	11	5	7
Li Hechen (CHN); Yao Ruixuan (CHN)	11	7	11	11
Benaiah Seah (SGP); Janelle Chiang (SGP)	11	9	7	11	15
Li Ki Ho (HKG); Mak Ming Shum (HKG)	9	11	11	9	17

Semifinals; 28 October
Tang Yiren (CHN); Hu Yi (CHN)	5	9	11	11	11
Sarthak Arya (IND); Syndrela Das (IND)	11	11	9	8	9
Li Hechen (CHN); Yao Ruixuan (CHN)	11	11	11
Li Ki Ho (HKG); Mak Ming Shum (HKG)	7	6	8

Gold medal match 29 October
Tang Yiren (CHN); Hu Yi (CHN)	11	6	7	8
Li Hechen (CHN); Yao Ruixuan (CHN)	4	11	11	11
