= Shirley Zhou =

Australian table tennis player

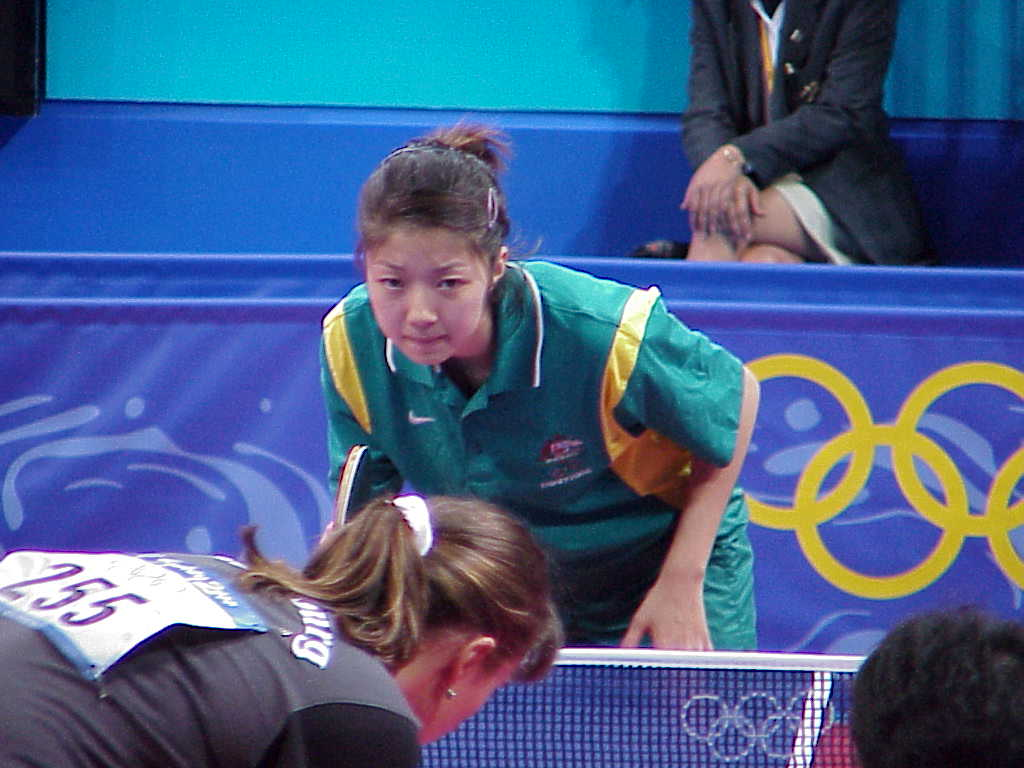
- Shirley Zhou at the Sydney 2000 Olympics

Personal information
- Nationality: Australian
- Born: Xuěnī Zhōu (周雪妮); 3 October 1978 (age 47) Beijing, China

Sport
- Sport: Table tennis
- Playing style: Fast attack, close to table
Medal record
Women's Table Tennis
Representing Australia
Oceania Table Tennis Championships
| Gold medal – first place | 1994 Papeete | Women's Singles |

Shirley Zhou (born 3 October 1978), born Xueni Zhou (Chinese: 周雪妮; pinyin: Zhōu Xuěnī), is an Australian table tennis player who competed at the 1996 and 2000 Olympics.

Shirley is the daughter of Chinese table tennis player and national coach of both China and Australia Zhou Lansun.

At the 2000 Olympics, Zhou and her teammate Miao Miao finished 5th in the women's doubles, Australia's best Olympic table tennis result to that point.

During her playing career, Shirley also won the following titles and awards:

- 1993 Australian Junior Girls Singles Champion
- 1994 Oceania Open Women Singles Champion
- 1998 Australian National Women Singles Champion
- Victorian Open Senior Women Champion in 1993, 1994 and 1998
- Victorian Open Junior Girls Champion in 1991 and 1992
- Table Tennis Australia Junior Player Of The Year award in 1992, 1993 & 1994
- Table Tennis Victoria Player Of The Year award in 1996 & 1998
- Table Tennis Victoria Junior Hall of Fame member (awarded in 2015)
- Table Tennis Victoria Open Hall of Fame member (awarded in 2010)
