= Trevor Brown (table tennis) =

Australian table tennis player

Personal information
- Full name: Trevor Michael Brown
- Nationality: Australian
- Born: 12 June 1979 (age 47) Melbourne, Australia
- Height: 170 cm (5 ft 7 in)

Sport
- Country: Australia
- Sport: Table tennis

Trevor Michael Brown (born 12 June 1979) is an Australian table tennis player. He competed in the men's singles event at the 2004 Summer Olympics.
