= Paul Langley =

Australian table tennis player

Personal information
- Nationality: Australian
- Born: 9 February 1972 (age 54) Adelaide, Australia

Sport
- Sport: Table tennis

Paul Langley (born 9 February 1972) is an Australian table tennis player. He competed in the men's singles event at the 1996 Summer Olympics.
