= Syndrela Das =

Indian table tennis player (born 2009)

Personal information
- Born: 23 August 2009 (age 17) Kolkata, West Bengal, India

Sport
- Country: India
- Sport: Table tennis
- League: Ultimate Table Tennis
- Team: Dempo Goa Challengers
Medal record
Women's table tennis
Representing India
Asian Youth Games
Bronze medal – third place	2025 Manama	Mixed doubles
Asian Youth Championships
Silver medal – second place	2026 Bangkok	Girl's doubles U-19
Bronze medal – third place	2026 Bangkok	Girl's singles U-19

Syndrela Das (born 23 August 2009) is an Indian female table tennis player. She represents India in International tournaments and plays for Dempo Goa Challengers in the Ultimate Table Tennis league.

== Career ==
Das is from the Baghajatin area in Kolkata, West Bengal. She was a trainee at Soumyadeep Roy's academy.

In 2021, she won her first National ranking tournament in the under-13 girls category. In 2023, she won three titles in the U15, U17 and U19 categories in the National Ranking Tournament.

In August 2026, she won her maiden senior women's title and the under 19 title at the National Ranking Table Tennis Championships in Kanpur. She was also selected to represent India at the 2026 Asian Games in September 2026.
