= Benyamin Faraji =

Iranian table tennis player (born 2009)

Personal information
- Born: 20 December 2009 (age 16) Tehran, Iran
- Height: 1.73 m (5 ft 8 in)
- Weight: 60 kg (132 lb)

Sport
- Sport: Table tennis
- Club: SV Union Velbert
- Playing style: Right-handed with a stylish playing style
- Highest ranking: 132
- Current ranking: 171
Medal record
Men's table tennis
Representing Iran
World Youth Championships
Bronze medal – third place	2024 Helsingborg	U15 Singles
Asian Youth Games
Bronze medal – third place	2025 Manama	Singles
Islamic Solidarity Games
Silver medal – second place	2025 Riyadh	Team
Bronze medal – third place	2025 Riyadh	Doubles

Benyamin Faraji (born 20 December 2009) is an Iranian professional table tennis player. Despite his young age, he was a member of the Iran team at the 2024 Asian Table Tennis Championships where he defeated World and Olympics champion and world No. 1 Wang Chuqin. He repeated the feat a year later when he defeated world No. 2 Lin Shidong in the 2025 Championships.

He also made history by winning the bronze medal in men's singles at the 2025 Asian Youth Games - the first individual table tennis medal for Iran in the history of Asian youth games and junior competitions.
