= Aditya Sareen =

Australian table tennis player (born 2008)

Personal information
- Nationality: Australian
- Born: April 28, 2008 (age 18) Melbourne, Australia

Sport
- Sport: Table tennis
- Club: Princeton Pong
- Playing style: Right-handed, two-winged attacker
- Equipment: Butterfly Timo Boll ALC / Zyre 03
- Highest ranking: 37 (September 2023)
- Current ranking: 115 (28 September 2026)
Medal record
Men's table tennis
Representing Australia
Oceania Table Tennis Championships
Gold medal – first place	2023	Men's singles
Gold medal – first place	2024	Men's team
Silver medal – second place	2025	Men's singles

Aditya "Adi" Sareen (born April 28, 2008) is an Australian professional table tennis player. He is the youngest-ever Men’s Singles champion at a continental championship (ITTF-Oceania), a title he won at age 15. As of 2026, he competes in Major League Table Tennis for the Los Angeles Spinners.

== Early life and education ==
Sareen was born in Melbourne, Australia. Shortly after his first birthday, his family relocated to New Jersey, United States. He began playing table tennis at the age of nine. To balance his professional training with academics, Sareen attends the Laurel Springs School, an online private school designed for elite student-athletes.

== Career ==
=== Training and development ===
Sareen's technical development was primarily established at Princeton Pong in New Jersey, first under the tutelage of former Chinese professional and coach Ying Peng and later under coach Cory Eider of Lily Yip Table Tennis Center. Sareen developed a high-speed, aggressive "two-winged" attacking style. His training regime at Princeton Pong, often involving six hours of daily practice, enabled him to reach the world No. 1 ranking in the ITTF U15 category by 2023.

=== International career ===
Representing Australia, Sareen made history at the 2023 ITTF-Oceania Championships by winning the Men’s Singles gold medal at 15 years old, becoming the youngest continental champion in the sport's history. He has since remained a core member of the Australian National Team, competing in the 2024 World Team Table Tennis Championships in Busan and the 2025 Oceania Championships, where he secured a silver medal in Men's Singles.

=== Major League Table Tennis ===
In 2023, Sareen was selected in the second round of the inaugural Major League Table Tennis draft by the Seattle Spinners. For the 2025–2026 season, he joined the Los Angeles Spinners.

== Playing style and equipment ==
Sareen is a right-handed shakehand attacker, known for aggressive counter-looping and close-to-the-table pressure. He is a sponsored athlete for Butterfly.

- Blade: Butterfly Timo Boll ALC
- Forehand Rubber: Butterfly Dignics 05
- Backhand Rubber: Butterfly Zyre 03 (2.7mm thickness)

== Honors and awards ==
- Table Tennis Australia Michael Szabados Award: Junior Player of the Year (2023)
- ITTF-Oceania: Men's Singles Champion (2023)
- WTT Youth Contender San Francisco: U17 Boys' Singles Winner (2025)
