= Divyanshi Bhowmick =

Indian table-tennis player (born 2010)

Personal information
- Born: 19 November 2010 (age 15) Kolkata, West Bengal, India

Sport
- Sport: Table tennis
- Coached by: Massimo Costantini
- Playing style: Right-handed, shakehand grip
Medal record
Women's table tennis
Representing India
World Youth Championships
Silver medal – second place	2023 Nova Gorica	Girls' doubles
Bronze medal – third place	2025 Cluj-Napoca	Girls' singles
Bronze medal – third place	2025 Cluj-Napoca	Girls' team
Asian Youth Championships
Gold medal – first place	2025 Tashkent	Girls' singles
Silver medal – second place	2026 Bangkok	Girls' doubles
Bronze medal – third place	2026 Bangkok	Mixed doubles

Divyanshi Bhowmick (19 November 2010) is an Indian table tennis player. She won the U15 girls' singles gold at the 2025 Asian Cadet Championships, the first Indian to do so in 36 years. She also secured bronze in the U15 girls' singles at the 2025 World Youth Championships, becoming the second Indian to medal in the event.

== Career ==
At the 2025 Asian Cadet Championships held in Tashkent, she won the gold medal in the girls' singles (U15) event, becoming the first Indian player in 36 years to secure the title. Among the other titles she won are the U17 Girls Singles gold at the 2024 WTT Youth Contender in Algiers and silver in the 2023 ITTF World Youth Championships held at Nova Gorica in the U-15 Girls Doubles with Jennifer Varghese. Apart from the U17 WTT Youth Contender title, she has won similar titles in U13 and U15 categories as well in the past and as of 2025, she was ranked 3rd, 14th and 24th in U15, U17 and U19 respectively. She was also named the Best Women's Player (Overall) at the Table Tennis Super League (TTSL) Maharashtra in April 2025.
