= 2018 in table tennis =

This page lists notable table tennis events taking place in 2018.

== World table tennis events ==
Senior

- February 22 – 25: 2018 ITTF Team World Cup in (England) London
  - Men: China (Xu Xin, Ma Long, & Fan Zhendong)
  - Women: China (Liu Shiwen, Ding Ning, & Zhu Yuling)
- April 29 – May 6: 2018 World Team Table Tennis Championships in (Sweden) Halmstad
  - Men: China (Fan Zhendong, Lin Gaoyuan, Ma Long, Wang Chuqin, & Xu Xin)
  - Women: China (Chen Meng, Ding Ning, Liu Shiwen, Wang Manyu, & Zhu Yuling)
- September 28 – 30: 2018 ITTF Women's World Cup in (China) Chengdu
  - (China) Ding Ning defeated (China) Zhu Yuling, 4–0, to win her third World Cup title.
  - (Chinese Taipei) Cheng I-ching took third place.
- October 19 – 21: 2018 ITTF Men's World Cup in (France) Paris
  - (China) Fan Zhendong defeated (Germany) Timo Boll, 4–1, to win his second World Cup title.
  - (China) Lin Gaoyuan took third place.

Junior and cadet

- October 23 – 31: 2018 World Cadet Challenge in Tottori
  - Cadet boys' singles: (China) ZENG Beixun
  - Cadet girls' singles: (China) KUAI Man
  - Cadet boys' doubles: Japan (Sora Matsushima & Yuma Tanigaki)
  - Cadet girls' doubles: Japan (Honami Nakamori & Hikari Okubo)
  - Cadet mixed doubles: (Romania) Iulian Chirita & (Japan) Yukari Sugasawa
- December 2–9: 2018 World Junior Table Tennis Championships in (Australia) Bendigo
  - Junior boys' singles: (China) XU Haidong
  - Junior girls' singles: (China) QIAN Tianyi
  - Junior boys' doubles: China (XIANG Peng & XU Haidong)
  - Junior girls' doubles: China (HUANG Fanzhen & SHI Xunyao)
  - Junior mixed doubles: China (XU Yingbin & SHI Xunyao)

== Continental table tennis championships ==
=== Africa (TT) ===
Senior

- March 1–3: 2018 ITTF African Cup in (Kenya) Nairobi
  - Men: (Egypt) Omar Assar defeated (Nigeria) Quadri Aruna, to win his first ITTF African Cup title.
    - (Egypt) Ahmed Saleh took third place.
  - Women: (Egypt) Dina Meshref defeated (Cameroon) Sarah Hanffou, to win her second ITTF African Cup title.
    - (Nigeria) Offiong Edem took third place.
- September 3–9: 2018 ITTF African Table Tennis Championships in (Mauritius) Port Louis
  - Men's singles: (Nigeria) Quadri Aruna
  - Women's singles: (Egypt) Dina Meshref
  - Men's doubles: Egypt (Youssef Abdel-Aziz & Khalid Assar)
  - Women's doubles: Egypt (Farah Abdel-Aziz & Reem El-Eraky)
  - Mixed doubles: Egypt (Ahmed Saleh & Dina Meshref)

Junior and cadet

- March 24–25: 2018 Road to Buenos Aires 2018 YOG series - Africa in (Tunisia) Soliman
  - Four players to compete in Buenos Aires 2018 YOG: (Azerbaijan) Yu Khinhang, (Iran) Amin Ahmadian, (Slovakia) Tatiana Kukulkova, & (Serbia) Sabina Šurjan
- April 7–13: 2018 African Junior and Cadet Championships in (Ivory Coast) Abidjan

- Junior boys' singles: (Egypt) Youssef Abdel-Aziz
- Junior girls' singles: (Egypt) Marwa Al-Hodaby
- Junior boys' doubles: Egypt (Youssef Abdel-Aziz & Marwan Abdelwahab)
- Junior girls' doubles: Egypt (Farida Badawy & Sara El-Hakem)
- Mixed doubles: Egypt (Youssef Abdel-Aziz & Marwa Al-Hodaby)
- Cadet boys' singles: (Egypt) Mohamed Azzam
- Cadet girls' singles: (Egypt) Hend Fathy

=== Americas (TT) ===
Senior

- March 4–8: 2018 Latin American Senior Championships in Havana
  - Men's singles: (Brazil) Eric Jouti
  - Women's singles: (Brazil) Bruna Takahashi
  - Men's doubles: Cuba (Andy Pereira & Jorge Campos)
  - Women's doubles: Chile (Paulina Vega & Judith Morales)
  - Mixed doubles: Brazil (Eric Jouti & Gui Lin)
- June 15–17: 2018 ITTF Pan-America Cup in (Paraguay) Asunción
  - Men's singles: (Brazil) Hugo Calderano
  - Women's singles: (Canada) Zhang Mo
- November 20–25: 2018 Pan American Table Tennis Championships in (Chile) Santiago
  - Men's singles: (United States) Kanak Jha
  - Women's singles: (Puerto Rico) Adriana Díaz
  - Men's doubles: Brazil (Vitor Ishiy & Eric Jouti)
  - Women's doubles: Canada (Alicia Cote & Zhang Mo)
  - Mixed doubles: Puerto Rico (Brian Afanador & Adriana Díaz)

Junior and cadet

- February 20–23: 2018 Central American U15/U18 in (El Salvador) San Salvador

- Junior boys' singles: (Mexico) Diego Vazquez
- Junior girls' singles: (Mexico) Clio Barcenas
- Junior boys' doubles: Nicaragua (Gary Castro & Genaro Roustan)
- Junior girls' doubles: Guatemala (Lucia Cordero & Hidalynn Zapata)
- Junior Mixed doubles: El Salvador (Oscar Villalta & Keren Bolanos Constanza)
- Cadet boys' singles: (Panama) Jacobo Vahnish
- Cadet girls' singles: (Mexico) Marbella Aceves
- Cadet boys' doubles: Guatemala (Sergio Carrillo & Diego de la Cruz)
- Cadet girls' doubles: Mexico (Marbella Aceves & Arantxa Cossio)
- Cadet Mixed doubles: Guatemala (Sergio Carrillo & Mariana Lopez)

- March 21–25: 2018 South American U15/U18 in (Chile) Santiago

- Junior boys' singles: (Argentina) Martin Bentancor
- Junior girls' singles: (Brazil) Tamyres Fukase
- Junior boys' doubles: Chile (Nicolas Burgos & Andres Martinez)
- Junior girls' doubles: Brazil (Tamyres Fukase & Livia Lima)
- Junior mixed doubles: Brazil (Guilherme Teodoro & Livia Lima)
- Youth boys' singles: (Peru) Carlos Fernandez
- Youth girls' singles: (Brazil) Giulia Takahashi
- Youth boys' doubles: Peru (Joel Cisneros & Carlos Fernandez)
- Youth girls' doubles: Brazil (Giulia Takahashi & Laura Watanabe)
- Youth mixed doubles: Peru (Carlos Fernandez & Maria Maldonado)

- April 14–15: 2018 Road to Buenos Aires 2018 YOG series - Latin America in (Paraguay) Asunción
  - Four players that have qualified to compete in Buenos Aires 2018 YOG: (Italy) Matteo Mutti, (Thailand) Yanapong Panagitgun, (Italy) Jamila Laurenti, & (Singapore) Goi Rui Xuan
- June 1–2: 2018 Road to Buenos Aires 2018 YOG series - North America in (Canada) Markham
  - Four players that have qualified to compete in Buenos Aires 2018 YOG: (North Korea) Kim Song Gun, (Germany) Cédric Meissner, (North Korea) Pyon Song Gyong, & (Germany) Franziska Schreiner
- July 10–15: 2018 Pan American Junior Table Tennis Championships in (Dominican Republic) Santo Domingo
  - Junior boys' singles: (United States) Kanak Jha
  - Junior girls' singles: (Puerto Rico) Adriana Diaz
  - Junior boys' doubles: United States (Sharon Alguetti & Kanak Jha)
  - Junior girls' doubles: United States (Rachel Sung & Rachel Yang)
  - Junior mixed doubles: United States (Sharon Alguetti & Crystal Wang)
  - Junior boys' Team: United States (Kanak Jha, Nikhil Kumar, Sharon Alguetti & Nikolas Tio)
  - Junior girls' Team: United States (Amy Wang, Crystal Wang, Rachel Sung & Rachel Yang)

=== Asia (TT) ===
Senior

- April 6–8: 2018 ITTF-ATTU Asian Cup in (Japan) Yokohama
  - Winners: (China) Fan Zhendong (m) / (China) Zhu Yuling (f)

Junior and cadet

- May 7–8: 2018 Road to Buenos Aires 2018 YOG series - Asia in (Thailand) Bangkok
  - Four players qualified to compete at Buenos Aires 2018: (Malaysia) Javen Choong, (India) Manav Vikash Thakkar, (South Korea) Choi Hae-eun, & (Croatia) Andrea Pavlovic

=== Europe (TT) ===
Senior

- February 3–4: 2018 Europe Top 16 Cup in (Switzerland) Montreux
  - Men: (Germany) Timo Boll defeated (Germany) Dimitrij Ovtcharov, 4–0 (13–11, 11–6, 11–3, 11–6), to win his sixth Europe Top 16 Cup title.
    - (Denmark) Jonathan Groth took third place.
  - Women: (Romania) Bernadette Szőcs defeated (Netherlands) Li Jie, 4–1 (12–10, 8–11, 11–6, 11–5, 11–7), to win her first Europe Top 16 Cup title.
    - (Romania) Elizabeta Samara took third place.
- September 18–23: 2018 European Table Tennis Championships in (Spain) Alicante
  - singles winners: (Germany) Timo Boll (m) / (Poland) Li Qian (f)
  - doubles winners: Austria (Daniel Habesohn & Robert Gardos) (m) / Germany (Nina Mittelham & Kristin Lang) (f)
  - Mixed doubles winners: Germany (Ruwen Filus & Han Ying)

U-21, Junior and cadet

- February 12–13: 2018 Road to Buenos Aires 2018 YOG series - Europe in (Czech Republic) Hodonín
  - Boys that qualified to compete in Buenos Aires 2018 YOG: (France) Bastian Rembert and (Romania) Cristian Pletea
  - Girls that qualified to compete in Buenos Aires 2018 YOG: (Romania) Andreea Dragoman and (Hong Kong) Lee Ka Yee
- March 8–11: 2018 European Under-21 Table Tennis Championships in (Belarus) Minsk
  - Men's singles: (Czech Republic) Tomas Polansky
  - Women's singles: (Russia) Mariia Tailakova
  - Men's doubles: Turkey (Ibrahim Gündüz & Abdullah Yigenler)
  - Women's doubles: (Ukraine) Solomiya Brateyko & (Poland) Natalia Bajor
- July 15–24: 2018 Table Tennis European Youth Championships in (Romania) Cluj-Napoca
  - boys' singles: (Greece) Ioannis Sgouropoulos
  - girls' singles: (Azerbaijan) Ning Jing
  - boys' doubles: Russia (Lev Katsman & Maksim Grebnev)
  - girls' doubles: (Russia) Anastasia Kolish & (France) Lucie Gauthier

=== Oceania (TT) ===
Senior

- March 15–19: 2018 Oceania Championships in Gold Coast, Queensland
  - Men's singles: (Australia) Chris Yan
  - Women's singles: (Australia) Jian Fang Lay
  - Men's doubles: Australia (Hu Heming & Chris Yan)
  - Women's doubles: Australia (Michelle Bromley & Melissa Tapper)
  - Mixed doubles: Australia (Chris Yan & Jian Fang Lay)
- May 18–19: 2018 ITTF-Oceania Cup in (Vanuatu) Port Vila
  - Men's singles: (Australia) Hu Heming
  - Women's singles: (Australia) Jian Fang Lay

Junior and cadet

- June 1–2: 2018 ITTF-Oceania Junior Championships in (Cook Islands) Rarotonga
  - Junior boys' singles: (Australia) Benjamin Gould
  - Junior girls' singles: (New Zealand) VONG Hui-Ling
  - Cadet boys' singles: (New Zealand) Nathan Xu
  - Cadet girls' singles: (New Zealand) ZHOU Jiayi
- June 8–9: 2018 Road to Buenos Aires 2018 YOG series - Oceania in (Cook Islands) Rarotonga
  - Qualified to compete in Buenos Aires 2018 YOG: (Singapore) Pang Yew En Koen & (India) Archana Girish Kamath

== 2018 ITTF World Tour ==
World Tour Platinum events

- March 8 – 11: 2018 Qatar Open in Doha
  - Men's Singles: (China) Fan Zhendong
  - Women's Singles: (China) Liu Shiwen
  - Men's Doubles: China (Fan Zhendong & Xu Xin)
  - Women's Doubles: China (CHEN Ke & Wang Manyu)
- March 23 – 25: 2018 German Open in (Germany) Bremen
  - Men's Singles: (China) Ma Long
  - Women's Singles: (Japan) Kasumi Ishikawa
  - Men's Doubles: China (Ma Long & Xu Xin)
  - Women's Doubles: Japan (Hina Hayata & Mima Ito)
- May 31 – June 3: 2018 China Open in Shenzhen
  - Men's Singles: (China) Ma Long
  - Women's Singles: (China) Wang Manyu
  - Men's Doubles: China (Fan Zhendong & Lin Gaoyuan)
  - Women's Doubles: China (Ding Ning & Zhu Yuling)
- July 19 – 22: 2018 Korea Open in Daejeon
  - Men's Singles: (South Korea) JANG Woo-jin
  - Women's Singles: (China) Zhu Yuling
  - Men's Doubles: South Korea (JANG Woo-jin & LIM Jong-hoon)
  - Women's Doubles: China (Chen Meng & Ding Ning)
- July 26 – 29: 2018 Australian Open in (Australia) Geelong
  - Men's Singles: (China) Xu Xin
  - Women's Singles: (China) Liu Shiwen
  - Men's Doubles: South Korea (Jung Young-sik & Lee Sang-su)
  - Women's Doubles: Japan (Hina Hayata & Mima Ito)
- November 8 – 11: Austrian Open (final) in (Austria) Linz
  - Men's Singles: (China) Liang Jingkun
  - Women's Singles: (China) Chen Meng
  - Men's Doubles: Japan (Masataka Morizono & Yuya Oshima)
  - Women's Doubles: Japan (Hina Hayata & Mima Ito)

World Tour events

- January 18 – 21: 2018 Hungarian Open in (Hungary) Budapest
  - Men's Singles: (China) Fan Zhendong
  - Women's Singles: (China) Wang Manyu
  - Men's Doubles: China (Fan Zhendong & YU Ziyang)
  - Women's Doubles: China (CHEN Xingtong & SUN Yingsha)
- May 24 – 27: 2018 Hong Kong Open in Hong Kong
  - Men's Singles: (Japan) Kazuhiro Yoshimura
  - Women's Singles: (China) Wang Manyu
  - Men's Doubles: Hong Kong (Ho Kwan Kit & Wong Chun Ting)
  - Women's Doubles: China (CHEN Xingtong & SUN Yingsha)
- June 8 – 10: 2018 Japan Open in Kitakyushu
  - Men's Singles: (Japan) Tomokazu Harimoto
  - Women's Singles: (Japan) Mima Ito
  - Men's Doubles: South Korea (Jung Young-sik & Lee Sang-su)
  - Women's Doubles: China (Gu Yuting & Mu Zi)
- August 16 – 19: 2018 Bulgaria Open in Panagyurishte
  - Men's Singles: (China) Xu Xin
  - Women's Singles: (China) Ding Ning
  - Men's Doubles: China (Ma Long & Xu Xin)
  - Women's Doubles: Japan (Kasumi Ishikawa & Mima Ito)
- August 23 – 26: 2018 Czech Open in (Czech Republic) Olomouc
  - Men's Singles: (China) ZHENG Peifeng
  - Women's Singles: (Japan) Kasumi Ishikawa
  - Men's Doubles: (Germany) Patrick Franziska & (Denmark) Jonathan Groth
  - Women's Doubles: China (Liu Gaoyang & Zhang Rui)
- November 1 – 4: Swedish Open (final) in (Sweden) Stockholm
  - Men's Singles: (China) Fan Zhendong
  - Women's Singles: (Japan) Mima Ito
  - Men's Doubles: Chinese Taipei (LIAO Cheng-Ting & LIN Yun-Ju)
  - Women's Doubles: China (CHEN Xingtong & SUN Yingsha)

Grand Finals

- December 13 – 16: 2018 ITTF World Tour Grand Finals in Incheon
  - Men's Singles: (Japan) Tomokazu Harimoto
  - Women's Singles: (China) Chen Meng
  - Men's Doubles: South Korea (JANG Woo-jin & LIM Jong-hoon)
  - Women's Doubles: Japan (Hina Hayata & Mima Ito)
  - Mixed Doubles: Hong Kong (Wong Chun Ting & Doo Hoi Kem

== 2018 ITTF Challenge Series ==
- March 13 – 17: Polish Open in (Poland) Spała
  - Men's Singles: (South Korea) LIM Jong-hoon
  - Women's Singles: (South Korea) Yang Ha-eun
  - Men's Doubles: South Korea (Jung Young-sik & Lee Sang-su)
  - Women's Doubles: South Korea (Jeon Ji-hee & Yang Ha-eun)
- March 28 – April 1: Spanish Open in (Spain) Guadalajara
  - Men's Singles: (South Korea) KIM Min-hyeok
  - Women's Singles: (Japan) Saki Shibata
  - Men's Doubles: South Korea (AN Jae-hyun & CHO Seung-min)
  - Women's Doubles: Japan (Honoka Hashimoto & Hitomi Satō)
- April 2 – 6: Slovenia Open in Otočec
  - Men's Singles: (Japan) Mizuki Oikawa
  - Women's Singles: (Japan) Miyu Kato
  - Men's Doubles: Poland (Marek Badowski & Patryk Zatowka)
  - Women's Doubles: Hong Kong (NG Wing Nam & Minnie Wai-Yam SOO)
- April 10 – 14: Croatia Open in Zagreb
  - Men's Singles: (Greece) Panagiotis Gionis
  - Women's Singles: (Japan) Saki Shibata
  - Men's Doubles: Hungary (Adam Szudi & Nandor Ecseki)
  - Women's Doubles: Japan (Honoka Hashimoto & Hitomi Satō)
- May 16 – 20: Thailand Open in Bangkok
  - Men's Singles: (China) XU Ruifeng
  - Women's Singles: (China) Liu Shiwen
  - Men's Doubles: Germany (Tobias Hippler & Kilian Ort)
  - Women's Doubles: Thailand (Orawan Paranang & Suthasini Sawettabut)
- June 13 – 17: DPR Korea Open in Pyongyang
  - Men's Singles: (North Korea) PAK Sin-hyok
  - Women's Singles: (North Korea) Kim Song-i
  - Men's Doubles: China (JI Jiale & LIU Yebo)
  - Women's Doubles: North Korea (CHA Hyo-sim & KIM Nam-hae)
- August 8 – 12: Nigeria Open in Lagos
  - Men's Singles: (Nigeria) Quadri Aruna
  - Women's Singles: (China) Guo Yan
  - Men's Doubles: France (Alexandre Robinot & Joe Seyfried)
  - Women's Doubles: China (QI Fenjie & SUN Chen)
- October 23 – 27: Belgium Open in De Haan
  - Men's Singles: (South Korea) PARK Gang-hyeon
  - Women's Singles: (Japan) Saki Shibata
  - Men's Doubles: South Korea (AN Jae-hyun & CHO Seung-min)
  - Women's Doubles: Japan (Satsuki Odo & Saki Shibata)
- November 13 – 18: Belarus Open (final) in Minsk
  - Men's Singles: (China) ZHAO Zihao
  - Women's Singles: (Japan) Saki Shibata
  - Men's Doubles: Japan (Kakeru Sone & Yuta Tanaka)
  - Women's Doubles: Japan (Satsuki Odo & Saki Shibata)

== 2018 ITTF World Junior Circuit ==
Golden Series events

- May 9 – 13: Thailand Junior & Cadet Open in Bangkok

- Junior Boys' Singles: (China) KUANG Li
- Junior Girls' Singles: (China) HUANG Fanzhen
- Cadet Boys' Singles: (China) XIANG Peng
- Cadet Girls' Singles: (China) CHEN Yi

- July 4 – 8: China Junior & Cadet Open in Taicang

- Junior Boys' Singles: (Japan) Kakeru Sone
- Junior Girls' Singles: (China) SHI Xunyao
- Cadet Boys' Singles: (Japan) Hiroto Shinozuka
- Cadet Girls' Singles: (China) KUAI Man

- August 1 – 5: Hong Kong Junior & Cadet Open in Hong Kong

- Junior Boys' Singles: (China) XU Haidong
- Junior Girls' Singles: (China) SHI Xunyao
- Junior Boys' Doubles: Japan (Kazuki Hamada & Hiroto Shinozuka)
- Junior Girls' Doubles: China (QIAN Tianyi & SHI Xunyao)
- Cadet Boys' Singles: (China) XIANG Peng
- Cadet Girls' Singles: (China) CHEN Yi
- Cadet Boys' Doubles: China (XIANG Peng & ZENG Beixun)
- Cadet Girls' Doubles: China (CHEN Yi & LI Yuqi)

- August 22 – 26: Chinese Taipei Junior & Cadet Open (final) in Taipei

- Junior Boys' Singles: (Chinese Taipei) LI Hsin-Yang
- Junior Girls' Singles: (South Korea) BYUN Seo-young
- Junior Boys' Doubles: Chinese Taipei (FENG Yi-Hsin & LI Hsin-Yang)
- Junior Girls' Doubles: Chinese Taipei (CHIEN Tung-Chuan & YU Hsiu-Ting)
- Cadet Boys' Singles: (Iran) Radin Khayyam
- Cadet Girls' Singles: (South Korea) BYUN Seo-young
- Cadet Boys' Doubles: Chinese Taipei (HUANG Yan-Cheng & LI Hsin-Yu)
- Cadet Girls' Doubles: Singapore (SER Lin Qian & ZHOU Jingyi)

Premium events

- February 7 – 11: Oman Junior & Cadet Open in Muscat

- Junior Boys' Singles: (China) YUAN Licen
- Junior Girls' Singles: (China) ZHANG Binyue
- Cadet Boys' Singles: (China) XIANG Peng
- Cadet Girls' Singles: (China) LI Yuqi

- February 14 – 18: Czech Junior & Cadet Open in (Czech Republic) Hodonín

- Junior Boys' Singles: (China) YU Heyi
- Junior Girls' Singles: (China) SHI Xunyao
- Junior Boys' Doubles: China (XU Yingbin & YU Heyi)
- Junior Girls' Doubles: China (SHI Xunyao & SUN Yizhen)
- Cadet Boys' Singles: (China) KUANG Li
- Cadet Girls' Singles: (China) CHEN Yi
- Cadet Boys' Doubles: China (KUANG Li & ZENG Beixun)
- Cadet Girls' Doubles: Japan (Honami Nakamori & Sakura Yokoi)

- March 21 – 25: Italy Junior & Cadet Open in Lignano

- Junior Boys' Singles: (China) XU Haidong
- Junior Girls' Singles: (China) QIAN Tianyi
- Junior Boys' Doubles: China (YU Heyi & YUAN Licen)
- Junior Girls' Doubles: China (HUANG Fanzhen & QIAN Tianyi)
- Cadet Boys' Singles: (China) XIANG Peng
- Cadet Girls' Singles: (China) CHEN Yi
- Cadet Boys' Doubles: China (KUANG Li & XIANG Peng)
- Cadet Girls' Doubles: (Russia) Elizabet Abraamian & (Romania) Elena Zaharia

- April 25 – 29: French Junior & Cadet Open in (France) Metz

- Junior Boys' Singles: (China) YU Heyi
- Junior Girls' Singles: (China) ZHANG Binyue
- Junior Boys' Doubles: China (XU Yingbin & YU Heyi)
- Junior Girls' Doubles: China (SHI Xunyao & SUN Yizhen)
- Cadet Boys' Singles: (China) XIANG Peng
- Cadet Girls' Singles: (China) YANG Yiyun
- Cadet Boys' Doubles: China (KUANG Li & XIANG Peng)
- Cadet Girls' Doubles: Japan (Kaho Akae & Yukari Sugasawa)

- May 23 – 27: Polish Junior & Cadet Open in (Poland) Władysławowo

- Junior Boys' Singles: (China) XIANG Peng
- Junior Girls' Singles: (China) SHI Xunyao
- Junior Boys' Doubles: Romania (Cristian Pletea & Rares Sipos)
- Junior Girls' Doubles: China (QIAN Tianyi & SHI Xunyao)
- Cadet Boys' Singles: (China) XIANG Peng
- Cadet Girls' Singles: (Japan) Yukari Sugasawa
- Cadet Boys' Doubles: China (KUANG Li & XIANG Peng)
- Cadet Girls' Doubles: Japan (Kaho Akae & Yukari Sugasawa)

- September 12 – 16: Croatia Junior & Cadet Open in Varaždin

- Junior Boys' Singles: (China) GENG Linyu
- Junior Girls' Singles: (China) ZUO Yue
- Junior Boys' Doubles: China (GENG Linyu & SONG Zhuoheng)
- Junior Girls' Doubles: China (LI Ruonan & ZUO Yue)
- Cadet Boys' Singles: (China) CHEN Yuanyu
- Cadet Girls' Singles: (China) KUAI Man
- Cadet Boys' Doubles: Chinese Taipei (LI Hsin-Yu & WANG Guan-Ru)
- Cadet Girls' Doubles: Chinese Taipei (HUANG Yu-Jie & TSAI Yun-En)

- November 7 – 11: Hungarian Junior & Cadet Open (final) in (Hungary) Szombathely

- Junior Boys' Singles: (China) LIU Yebo
- Junior Girls' Singles: (China) WU Yangchen
- Junior Boys' Doubles: Russia (Maksim Grebnev & Lev Katsman)
- Junior Girls' Doubles: China (WU Yangchen & ZANG Xiaotong)
- Cadet Boys' Singles: (China) HUANG Youzheng
- Cadet Girls' Singles: (China) CHEN Yi
- Cadet Boys' Doubles: Chinese Taipei (HUANG Yan-Cheng & LI Yan Jun)
- Cadet Girls' Doubles: China (CHEN Yi & LI Yuqi)

Regular events

- February 21 – 25: Swedish Junior & Cadet Open in (Sweden) Örebro

- Junior Boys' Singles: (Sweden) Truls Moregard
- Junior Girls' Singles: (Japan) Yumento Soma
- Junior Boys' Doubles: Japan (Aoto Sazu & Takeru Kashiwa)
- Junior Girls' Doubles: (France) Camille Lutz & (Portugal) Celia Silva
- Cadet Boys' Singles: (Sweden) Theo Abrahamsson
- Cadet Girls' Singles: (France) Prithika Pavade

- March 19 – 23: Tunisia Junior & Cadet Open in Soliman

- Junior Boys' Singles: (Iran) Amin Ahmadian
- Junior Girls' Singles: (Serbia) Sabina Šurjan
- Junior Boys' Doubles: (Hungary) Csaba Andras & (Canada) Jeremy Hazin
- Junior Girls' Doubles: France (Lucie Gauthier & Leili Mostafavi)
- Cadet Boys' Singles: (China) LIU Menglong
- Cadet Girls' Singles: (Serbia) Radmila Tominjak
- Cadet Boys' Doubles: India (Aadil Anand & Payas Jain)
- Cadet Girls' Doubles: Egypt (Roa Amro & Farida Badawy)

- April 1 – 5: Côte d'Ivoire Junior & Cadet Open in (Ivory Coast) Abidjan

- Junior Boys' Singles: (Egypt) Youssef Abdel-Aziz
- Junior Girls' Singles: (China) CHEN Junjin
- Junior Boys' Doubles: Egypt (Youssef Abdel-Aziz & Ahmed El-Borhamy)
- Junior Girls' Doubles: China (CHEN Junjin & LIN Lequan)
- Cadet Boys' Singles: (Egypt) Ziad Elshawa
- Cadet Girls' Singles: (China) CHEN Junjin
- Cadet Boys' Doubles: Ivory Coast (Jean-Pierre Bayala & Ange Michel Seri)
- Cadet Girls' Doubles: China (CHEN Junjin & LIN Lequan)

- April 9 – 13: Paraguay Junior & Cadet Open in Asunción

- Junior Boys' Singles: (Brazil) Guilherme Teodoro
- Junior Girls' Singles: (Chile) Valentina Rios
- Cadet Boys' Singles: (Peru) Carlos Fernandez
- Cadet Girls' Singles: (Chile) Natasha Ruiz

- April 18 – 22: Belgium Junior & Cadet Open in Spa

- Junior Boys' Singles: (Greece) Ioannis Sgouropoulos
- Junior Girls' Singles: (Japan) Yukari Sugasawa
- Junior Boys' Doubles: Japan (Aoto Asazu & Takeru Kashiwa)
- Junior Girls' Doubles: Hong Kong (LEE Ka Yee & WONG Chin Yau)
- Cadet Boys' Singles: (Spain) Arnau Pons
- Cadet Girls' Singles: (Japan) Yukari Sugasawa
- Cadet Boys' Doubles: France (Felix Lebrun & Fabio Rakotoarimanana)
- Cadet Girls' Doubles: Japan (Kaho Akae & Yukari Sugasawa)

- May 9 – 13: Spanish Junior & Cadet Open in (Spain) Castell-Platja d'Aro

- Junior Boys' Singles: (Russia) Vladimir Sidorenko
- Junior Girls' Singles: (China) ZUO Yue
- Junior Boys' Doubles: Russia (Maksim Grebnev & Lev Katsman)
- Junior Girls' Doubles: (Czech Republic) Zdena Blaskova & (Italy) Jamila Laurenti
- Cadet Boys' Singles: (France) Myshaal Sabhi
- Cadet Girls' Singles: (China) YANG Shilu
- Cadet Boys' Doubles: France (Ethan Claude & Myshaal Sabhi)
- Cadet Girls' Doubles: China (XIE Jiatong & YANG Shilu)

- May 17 – 20: Slovak Junior Open in (Slovakia) Senec

- Junior Boys' Singles: (Poland) Samuel Kulczycki
- Junior Girls' Singles: (China) WANG Xiaotong
- Junior Boys' Doubles: (Austria) Maciej Kolodziejczyk & (Germany) Cedric Meissner
- Junior Girls' Doubles: China (WANG Xiaotong & WEI Yuanhui)

- May 28 – 31: Canada Junior & Cadet Open in Markham, Ontario

- Junior Boys' Singles: (China) SUN Zheng
- Junior Girls' Singles: (Poland) Anna Wegrzyn
- Cadet Boys' Singles: (Canada) Edward Ly
- Cadet Girls' Singles: (United States) Lavanya Maruthapandian

- June 4 – 7: Cook Islands Junior & Cadet Open in Rarotonga

- Junior Boys' Singles: (Singapore) PANG Yew En Koen
- Junior Girls' Singles: (China) DAI Tian
- Junior Boys' Doubles: (Republic of Ireland) Owen Cathcart & (Belgium) Laurens Devos
- Junior Girls' Doubles: China (DAI Tian & YANG Hangguo)
- Cadet Boys' Singles: (Panama) Jacobo Vahnish
- Cadet Girls' Singles: (Australia) Parleen Kaur
- Cadet Boys' Doubles: New Zealand (PARK Sang-Yong & Nathan Xu)
- Cadet Girls' Doubles: Fiji (Filomena & Loata Duncan)

- July 25 – 29: Jordan Junior & Cadet Open in Amman

- Junior Boys' Singles: (Chinese Taipei) LI Hsin-Yang
- Junior Girls' Singles: (Chinese Taipei) CHEN Ting-Ting
- Junior Boys' Doubles: Iran (Amirreza Abbasi & Amin Ahmadian)
- Junior Girls' Doubles: Chinese Taipei (CAI Fong-En & CHEN Ting-Ting)
- Cadet Boys' Singles: (Chinese Taipei) LI Hsin-Yu
- Cadet Girls' Singles: (China) SUI Xiaoran
- Cadet Boys' Doubles: India (Deepit Patil & Dev Shroff)
- Cadet Girls' Doubles: China (SUI Xiaoran & ZHANG Yulei)

- August 15 – 19: El Salvador Junior & Cadet Open in San Salvador

- Junior Boys' Singles: (Chinese Taipei) TAI Ming-Wei
- Junior Girls' Singles: (Chinese Taipei) FANG Sih-Han
- Junior Boys' Doubles: Chinese Taipei (KAO Min-Chi & TAI Ming-Wei)
- Junior Girls' Doubles: Chinese Taipei (FANG Sih-Han & TSAI Yu-Chin)
- Cadet Boys' Singles: (Chinese Taipei) WANG Chen-You
- Cadet Girls' Singles: (Chinese Taipei) CHEN Tsai-Ni
- Cadet Boys' Doubles: Chinese Taipei (WANG Chen-You & YANG Tsan-Wei)
- Cadet Girls' Doubles: Chinese Taipei (CHEN Tsai-Ni & LIU Ru-Yun)

- September 19 – 23: Serbia Junior & Cadet Open in Belgrade

- Junior Boys' Singles: (China) ZENG Beixun
- Junior Girls' Singles: (Thailand) Jinnipa Sawettabut
- Junior Boys' Doubles: (Thailand) Yanapong Panagitgun & (Singapore) Gerald Zong Jun Yu
- Junior Girls' Doubles: (Singapore) Eunice Lim & (Thailand) Jinnipa Sawettabut
- Cadet Boys' Singles: (India) Payas Jain
- Cadet Girls' Singles: (China) LI Zeyan
- Cadet Boys' Doubles: China (LIU Shuanghao & XU Haotian)
- Cadet Girls' Doubles: China (DING Zige & ZHANG Yunhan)

- October 24 – 28: Egypt Junior & Cadet Open in Sharm El Sheikh

- Junior Boys' Singles: (China) DING Shixian
- Junior Girls' Singles: (Russia) Ekaterina Zironova
- Junior Boys' Doubles: Egypt (Youssef Abdel-Aziz & Marwan Abdelwahab)
- Junior Girls' Doubles: China (WANG Yidan & ZHOU Bingru)
- Cadet Boys' Singles: (Romania) Radu Andrei Miron
- Cadet Girls' Singles: (Poland) Ilona Sztwiertnia
- Cadet Boys' Doubles: Romania (Dragos Alexandru Bujor & Radu Andrei Miron)
- Cadet Girls' Doubles: (Egypt) Farida Badawy & (Greece) Malamatenia Papadimitriou

- November 2 – 4: Slovak Cadet Open in (Slovakia) Bratislava
  - Cadet Boys' Singles: (China) CHEN Yifei
  - Cadet Girls' Singles: (China) XU Yi
  - Cadet Boys' Doubles: China (NIU Zeqian & ZHANG Jinghan)
  - Cadet Girls' Doubles: China (SUN Xiaomeng & XU Yi)
- November 27 – 30: Portugal Junior & Cadet Open (final) Guimarães

- Junior Boys' Singles: (India) Manav Vikash Thakkar
- Junior Girls' Singles: (Portugal) LIU Yangzi
- Junior Boys' Doubles: India (Manush Utpalbhai Shah & Manav Vikash Thakkar)
- Junior Girls' Doubles: China (QIN Xiaoce & XIN Chenglin)
- Cadet Boys' Singles: (China) XIONG Mengyang
- Cadet Girls' Singles: (China) WANG Xinyu
- Cadet Boys' Doubles: Croatia (Ivor Ban & Lovro Zovko)
- Cadet Girls' Doubles: Portugal (Ines Matos & Patricia Santos)

== See also ==
- International Table Tennis Federation
- 2018 in sports
