= 2018 Oceania Table Tennis Championships =

- Date: 15–19 March 2018
- Edition: 19th
- Prize money: AU$20,000
- Location: Gold Coast, Australia
- Oceania Table Tennis Championships

The 2018 Oceania Table Tennis Championships was held in Gold Coast, Australia, from 15–19 March 2018. The competition took place in two venues: the Gold Coast Table Tennis Association, and Oxenford Studios, which was also used as the venue for the table tennis events at the 2018 Commonwealth Games.

== Schedule ==
The competition featured 14 events: seven for senior players and seven for under-21 players.

The schedule below was released by the International Table Tennis Federation.

Groups/Rounds
Finals

Date	15 March	16 March	17 March	18 March	19 March
Men's singles			GS	R16, QF, SF	F
Women's singles			GS	QF, SF	F
Men's doubles			R16, QF	SF	F
Women's doubles			QF	SF	F
Mixed doubles			R16, QF	SF	F
Men's team	GS	GS			F
Women's team	GS	GS			F
Under-21 Men's singles			GS	QF, SF	F
Under-21 Women's singles			GS	SF	F
Under-21 Men's doubles			QF	SF, F	
Under-21 Women's doubles				SF, F	
Under-21 Mixed doubles			QF	SF, F	
Under-21 Men's team	GS	GS, F			
Under-21 Women's team	GS	GS, F			

== Medal summary ==
=== Medallists ===
==== Senior events ====
Event	Gold	Silver	Bronze
Men's singles	(Australia) Chris Yan	(Australia) Hu Heming	(Australia) David Powell
Men's singles	(Australia) Chris Yan	(Australia) Hu Heming	(Australia) Kane Townsend
Women's singles	(Australia) Jian Fang Lay	(Australia) Melissa Tapper	(Australia) Michelle Bromley
Women's singles	(Australia) Jian Fang Lay	(Australia) Melissa Tapper	(Australia) Feng Chunyi
Men's doubles	(Australia) Hu Heming (Australia) Chris Yan	(Australia) David Powell (Australia) Kane Townsend	(New Zealand) Alfred Dela-Peña (New Zealand) Dean Shu
Men's doubles	(Australia) Hu Heming (Australia) Chris Yan	(Australia) David Powell (Australia) Kane Townsend	(French Polynesia) Alize Belrose (French Polynesia) Bydhir Carnet
Women's doubles	(Australia) Michelle Bromley (Australia) Melissa Tapper	(Vanuatu) Anolyn Lulu (Vanuatu) Priscila Tommy	(Fiji) Grace Rosi Yee (Fiji) Sally Yee
Mixed doubles	(Australia) Chris Yan (Australia) Jian Fang Lay	(Australia) Hu Heming (Australia) Melissa Tapper	(Australia) Trent Carter (Australia) Feng Chunyi
Mixed doubles	(Australia) Chris Yan (Australia) Jian Fang Lay	(Australia) Hu Heming (Australia) Melissa Tapper	(Australia) Kane Townsend (Australia) Michelle Bromley
Men's team	Australia; Trent Carter; Hu Heming; David Powell; Kane Townsend; Chris Yan	New Zealand; Matthew Ball; Alfred Dela-Peña; Dinyar Irani; Dean Shu	Vanuatu; Ham Lulu; Yoshua Shing; Randy William
Women's team	Australia; Michelle Bromley; Feng Chunyi; Jian Fang Lay; Miao Miao; Melissa Tapper	Combined Team (New Caledonia) Solenn Danger (New Caledonia) Lorie La (French Polynesia) Melveen Richmond	Vanuatu; Anolyn Lulu; Stephanie Qwea; Priscila Tommy

==== Under-21 events ====
Event	Gold	Silver	Bronze
Under-21; Men's singles	(New Zealand) Nathan Xu	(Australia) Benjamin Gould	(Australia) Luke Cosgriff
Under-21; Men's singles	(New Zealand) Nathan Xu	(Australia) Benjamin Gould	(New Zealand) Dean Shu
Under-21; Women's singles	(Australia) Danni-Elle Townsend	(Australia) Parleen Kaur	(Australia) Matilda Alexandersson
Under-21; Women's singles	(Australia) Danni-Elle Townsend	(Australia) Parleen Kaur	(Australia) Chermaine Quah
Under-21; Men's doubles	(Australia) Luke Cosgriff (Australia) Xavier Dixon	(Australia) Rohan Dhooria (Australia) Benjamin Gould	(New Zealand) Alfred Dela-Peña (New Zealand) Nathan Xu
Under-21; Men's doubles	(Australia) Luke Cosgriff (Australia) Xavier Dixon	(Australia) Rohan Dhooria (Australia) Benjamin Gould	(French Polynesia) Bydhir Carnet (Papua New Guinea) Geoffrey Loi
Under-21; Women's doubles	(Australia) Parleen Kaur (Australia) Danni-Elle Townsend	(Australia) Matilda Alexandersson (Australia) Chermaine Quah	(New Caledonia) Solenn Danger (New Caledonia) Lorie La
Under-21; Women's doubles	(Australia) Parleen Kaur (Australia) Danni-Elle Townsend	(Australia) Matilda Alexandersson (Australia) Chermaine Quah	(Fiji) Grace Rosi Yee (Fiji) Sally Yee
Under-21; Mixed doubles	(Australia) Xavier Dixon (Australia) Danni-Elle Townsend	(Australia) Benjamin Gould (Australia) Matilda Alexandersson	(Fiji) Vicky Wu (Fiji) Grace Rosi Yee
Under-21; Mixed doubles	(Australia) Xavier Dixon (Australia) Danni-Elle Townsend	(Australia) Benjamin Gould (Australia) Matilda Alexandersson	(New Caledonia) Ronan Aubry (New Caledonia) Lorie La
Under-21; Men's team	New Zealand; Alfred Dela-Peña; Dean Shu; Nathan Xu	Australia; Luke Cosgriff; Rohan Dhooria; Xavier Dixon; Benjamin Gould	Combined Team (New Caledonia) Ronan Aubry (French Polynesia) Bydhir Carnet (Fiji) Vicky Wu
Under-21; Women's team	Australia; Matilda Alexandersson; Parleen Kaur; Chermaine Quah; Danni-Elle Townsend	New Caledonia; Solenn Danger; Lorie La	Fiji; Grace Rosi Yee; Sally Yee

=== Medal table ===
Rank	Nation	Gold	Silver	Bronze	Total
1	Australia (AUS)	12	10	9	31
2	New Zealand (NZL)	2	1	3	6
3	New Caledonia (NCL)	0	1	2	3
3	Vanuatu (VAN)	0	1	2	3
5	(New Caledonia) / (French Polynesia) Combined Team	0	1	0	1
6	Fiji (FIJ)	0	0	4	4
7	French Polynesia (TAH)	0	0	1.5	1.5
8	(Fiji) / (New Caledonia) / (French Polynesia) Combined Team	0	0	1	1
9	Papua New Guinea (PNG)	0	0	0.5	0.5
Totals (9 entries)		14	14	23	51

== See also ==
- Oceania Table Tennis Federation
- 2018 ITTF-Oceania Cup
