= 2018 World Cup (disambiguation) =

The 2018 World Cup was the 21st edition of the FIFA senior men's association football tournament.

2018 World Cup may also refer to:

== Association football ==
- 2018 FIFA U-20 Women's World Cup
- 2018 FIFA U-17 Women's World Cup
- 2018 FIFA Club World Cup

== Basketball ==
- 2018 FIBA 3x3 World Cup
- 2018 FIBA Under-17 Basketball World Cup
- 2018 FIBA Women's Basketball World Cup

== Cycling ==
- 2017–18 UCI Cyclo-cross World Cup
- 2017–18 UCI Track Cycling World Cup
- 2018 UCI Mountain Bike World Cup

== Field hockey ==
- 2018 Men's Hockey World Cup
- 2018 Women's Hockey World Cup

== Table tennis ==
- 2018 ITTF Team World Cup
- 2018 ITTF Men's World Cup
- 2018 ITTF Women's World Cup

== Winter sports ==
- 2017–18 FIS Alpine Ski World Cup
- 2017–18 FIS Cross-Country World Cup
- 2017–18 FIS Freestyle Ski World Cup
- 2017–18 FIS Nordic Combined World Cup
- 2017–18 FIS Ski Jumping World Cup
- 2017–18 FIS Snowboard World Cup
- 2017–18 ISU Short Track Speed Skating World Cup
- 2017–18 ISU Speed Skating World Cup
- 2017–18 Biathlon World Cup
- 2017–18 Bobsleigh World Cup
- 2017–18 Luge World Cup
- 2017–18 Skeleton World Cup

== Other sports ==
- 2018 Athletics World Cup
- 2018 IAAF Continental Cup
- 2018 Canoe Slalom World Cup
- 2018 Cricket World Cup Qualifier
- 2018 FIG Artistic Gymnastics World Cup Series
- 2018 FIG Rhythmic Gymnastics World Cup Series
- 2018 ISSF World Cup
- 2018 Rugby World Cup Sevens
- 2018 PDC World Cup of Darts
- 2018 World Cup of Pool
