= 2018 ITTF-Oceania Cup =

Tournament details
- Dates: 18–19 May 2018
- Edition: 10th
- Venue: Korman Stadium
- Location: Port Vila, Vanuatu

Champions
- Men's singles: (Australia) Hu Heming
- Women's singles: (Australia) Jian Fang Lay

The 2018 ITTF-Oceania Cup was a table tennis event that took place from 18–19 May in Port Vila, Vanuatu. The event was organised by ITTF-Oceania, under the authority of the International Table Tennis Federation (ITTF). It was the 10th edition of the event, and the first time that it had been held in Vanuatu. Men's singles and women's singles competitions were held, and the winner of each event qualified automatically for the 2018 Men's and Women's World Cups.

The eighth edition of the Pacific Cup was also held during the event, with players from Australia and New Zealand excluded from competing.

== Medallists ==
Event	Gold	Silver	Bronze
Men's singles	(Australia) Hu Heming	(New Zealand) Dean Shu	(Australia) David Powell
Women's singles	(Australia) Jian Fang Lay	(Australia) Melissa Tapper	(New Zealand) Cheng Zhiying

== Players ==
Qualification was based primarily on a points list, with a maximum of two players per association being invited to compete in both the men's and women's singles competitions.

Men's singles

- (Australia) David Powell
- (Australia) Hu Heming
- (Vanuatu) Yoshua Shing
- (Papua New Guinea) Geoffrey Loi
- (Fiji) Philip Wing
- (Fiji) Vicky Wu
- (New Zealand) Dean Shu
- (New Zealand) Matthew Ball

Women's singles

- (Australia) Jian Fang Lay
- (Australia) Melissa Tapper
- (Fiji) Sally Yee
- (Fiji) Grace Yee
- (New Zealand) Cheng Zhiying
- (New Zealand) Natalie Paterson
- (New Caledonia) Ornella Bouteille
- (Vanuatu) Stephanie Qwea

== Men's singles ==
=== Group stage ===
	Group 1	(Australia); Hu	(New Zealand); Shu	(Papua New Guinea); Loi	(Fiji); Wu
1	(Australia) Hu Heming		4–0	4–0	4–0
2	(New Zealand) Dean Shu	0–4		4–0	4–0
3	(Papua New Guinea) Geoffrey Loi	0–4	0–4		4–1
4	(Fiji) Vicky Wu	0–4	0–4	1–4	

	Group 2	(New Zealand); Ball	(Australia); Powell	(Vanuatu); Shing	(Fiji); Wing
1	(New Zealand) Matthew Ball		4–3	4–1	4–0
2	(Australia) David Powell	3–4		4–2	4–0
3	(Vanuatu) Yoshua Shing	1–4	2–4		4–0
4	(Fiji) Philip Wing	0–4	0–4	0–4	

=== Knockout stage ===
Quarterfinals
(Australia) Hu Heming
Bye
(Papua New Guinea) Geoffrey Loi	2	6	8	2
(Australia) David Powell	11	11	11	11
(New Zealand) Dean Shu	11	11	11	11
(Vanuatu) Yoshua Shing	5	4	9	2
Bye
(New Zealand) Matthew Ball

Semifinals
(Australia) Hu Heming	11	11	8	7	11	11
(Australia) David Powell	4	4	11	11	8	8
(New Zealand) Dean Shu	11	6	8	11	11	11	11
(New Zealand) Matthew Ball	13	11	11	4	9	3	3

Final
(Australia) Hu Heming	9	11	9	12	11	11
(New Zealand) Dean Shu	11	6	11	10	7	6
Third place
(Australia) David Powell	11	11	11	11	11
(New Zealand) Matthew Ball	5	0	8	13	5

== Women's singles ==
=== Group stage ===
	Group 1	(Australia); Lay	(New Zealand); Cheng	(Fiji); Yee	(New Caledonia); Bouteille
1	(Australia) Jian Fang Lay		4–0	4–0	4–0
2	(New Zealand) Cheng Zhiying	0–4		4–0	4–1
3	(Fiji) Sally Yee	0–4	0–4		4–1
4	(New Caledonia) Ornella Bouteille	0–4	1–4	1–4	

	Group 2	(Australia); Tapper	(New Zealand); Paterson	(Fiji); Yee	(Vanuatu) Qwea
1	(Australia) Melissa Tapper		4–1	4–0	4–0
2	(New Zealand) Natalie Paterson	1–4		4–0	4–1
3	(Fiji) Grace Yee	0–4	0–4		4–2
4	(Vanuatu) Stephanie Qwea	0–4	1–4	2–4	

=== Knockout stage ===
Quarterfinals
(Australia) Jian Fang Lay
Bye
(Fiji) Sally Yee	5	6	5	5
(New Zealand) Natalie Paterson	11	11	11	11
(New Zealand) Cheng Zhiying	6	11	9	12	11	11
(Fiji) Grace Yee	11	9	11	10	8	8
Bye
(Australia) Melissa Tapper

Semifinals
(Australia) Jian Fang Lay	11	11	11	11
(New Zealand) Natalie Paterson	4	2	2	4
(New Zealand) Cheng Zhiying	5	9	4	9
(Australia) Melissa Tapper	11	11	11	11

Final
(Australia) Jian Fang Lay	11	11	6	7	12	11
(Australia) Melissa Tapper	3	6	11	11	10	5
Third place
(New Zealand) Natalie Paterson	11	7	8	9	8
(New Zealand) Cheng Zhiying	6	11	11	11	11

== Pacific Cup ==
=== Men ===
Semifinals								Final
1	(Vanuatu) Yoshua Shing	11	11	11	11	9	11
4	(Fiji) Vicky Wu	5	7	8	13	11	3	(Vanuatu) Yoshua Shing	11	11	11	11	11
3	(Fiji) Philip Wing	8	5	12	4	7		(Papua New Guinea) Geoffrey Loi	7	6	13	6	7
2	(Papua New Guinea) Geoffrey Loi	11	11	10	11	11

=== Women ===
Semifinals							Final
1	(Fiji) Grace Yee	11	11	11	13
4	(New Caledonia) Ornella Bouteille	8	6	6	11		(Fiji) Grace Yee	11	11	11	10	10	3	6
3	(Vanuatu) Stephanie Qwea	3	15	3	8	6	(Fiji) Sally Yee	3	5	7	12	12	11	11
2	(Fiji) Sally Yee	11	13	11	11	11

== See also ==
- 2018 Oceania Table Tennis Championships
- 2018 Europe Top 16 Cup
- 2018 ITTF-ATTU Asian Cup
- 2018 ITTF Pan-America Cup
