= 2018 ITTF Women's World Cup =

- Venue: Sichuan Province Gymnasium
- Location: Chengdu, China
- Date: 28–30 September
- Competitors: 20 from 15 nations

Medalists
gold medal	(China) Ding Ning
silver medal	(China) Zhu Yuling
bronze medal	(Chinese Taipei) Cheng I-ching

The 2018 ITTF Women's World Cup was a table tennis competition held in Chengdu, China, from 28 to 30 September 2018. It was the 22nd edition of the ITTF-sanctioned event, and the ninth time that it has been staged in China.

In the final, China's Ding Ning defeated fellow Chinese player Zhu Yuling, 4–0, to win her third World Cup title.

== Qualification ==
In total, 20 players qualified for the World Cup:

- The current World Champion
- 18 players from the five Continental Cups held during 2018
- A wild card, selected by the ITTF

A maximum of two players from each association could qualify.

Means of qualification	Date	Venue	Places	Qualified players
2017 World Championships	31 May–4 June 2017	(Germany) Düsseldorf	1	(China) Ding Ning
2018 Europe Top 16 Cup	3–4 February 2018	(Switzerland) Montreux	3	(Romania) Bernadette Szőcs (Netherlands) Li Jie (Romania) Elizabeta Samara
2018 ITTF Africa Top 16 Cup	1–3 March 2018	(Kenya) Nairobi	1	(Egypt) Dina Meshref
2018 ITTF-ATTU Asian Cup	6–8 April 2018	(Japan) Yokohama	3	(China) Zhu Yuling (Japan) Kasumi Ishikawa (Chinese Taipei) Cheng I-ching
2018 ITTF-Oceania Cup	18–19 May 2018	(Vanuatu) Port Vila	1	(Australia) Jian Fang Lay
2018 ITTF Pan-America Cup	15–17 June 2018	(Paraguay) Asunción	2	(Canada) Zhang Mo (United States) Yue Wu
Additional qualifiers (Note: Based on Continental Cup finishing position and ITTF World Ranking on 1 July 2018)	n/a	n/a	8	(Japan) Miu Hirano (Hong Kong) Doo Hoi Kem (Chinese Taipei) Chen Szu-Yu (South Korea) Seo Hyo-won (Sweden) Matilda Ekholm (Austria) Sofia Polcanova (Hungary) Georgina Póta (Austria) Liu Jia
ITTF wild card	n/a	n/a	1	(North Korea) Kim Song-i
Total			20	

== Competition format ==
The tournament consisted of two stages: a preliminary group stage and a knockout stage. The players seeded 9 to 20 were drawn into four groups, with three players in each group. The top two players from each group then joined the top eight seeded players in the second stage of the competition, which consisted of a knockout draw.

== Seeding ==
The seeding list was based on the official ITTF world ranking for September 2018.

1. (China) Zhu Yuling (final)
2. (Japan) Kasumi Ishikawa (semifinals)
3. (China) Ding Ning (champion)
4. (Chinese Taipei) Cheng I-ching (semifinals)
5. (Japan) Miu Hirano (quarterfinals)
6. (South Korea) Seo Hyo-won (quarterfinals)
7. (Hong Kong) Doo Hoi Kem (quarterfinals)
8. (Austria) Sofia Polcanova (quarterfinals)
9. (Netherlands) Li Jie (preliminary round)
10. (Romania) Elizabeta Samara (first round)
11. (Canada) Zhang Mo (preliminary round)
12. (Romania) Bernadette Szőcs (first round)
13. (Chinese Taipei) Chen Szu-yu (first round)
14. (Sweden) Matilda Ekholm (first round)
15. (Hungary) Georgina Póta (first round)
16. (Austria) Liu Jia (first round)
17. (Egypt) Dina Meshref (preliminary round)
18. (North Korea) Kim Song-i (first round)
19. (United States) Yue Wu (preliminary round)
20. (Australia) Jian Fang Lay (first round)

== Preliminary stage ==
The preliminary group stage took place on 28 September, with the top two players in each group progressing to the main draw.

	Group A	(North Korea) Kim	(Sweden) Ekholm	(Netherlands) Li	Points
18	(North Korea) Kim Song-i		4–3	4–1	4
14	(Sweden) Matilda Ekholm	3–4		4–2	3
9	(Netherlands) Li Jie	1–4	2–4		2

	Group B	(Romania) Samara	(Chinese Taipei) Chen	(Egypt) Meshref	Points
10	(Romania) E. Samara		4–3	4–3	4
13	(Chinese Taipei) Chen Szu-yu	3–4		4–0	3
17	(Egypt) Dina Meshref	3–4	0–4		2

	Group C	(Australia) Lay	(Hungary) Póta	(Canada) Zhang	Points
20	(Australia) Jian Fang Lay		4–1	3–4	3
15	(Hungary) Georgina Póta	1–4		4–1	3
11	(Canada) Zhang Mo	4–3	1–4		3

	Group D	(Romania) Szőcs	(Austria) Liu	(United States) Wu	Points
12	(Romania) B. Szőcs		4–2	4–2	4
16	(Austria) Liu Jia	2–4		4–3	3
19	(United States) Yue Wu	2–4	3–4		2

== Main draw ==
The knockout stage took place from 29 to 30 September.

First round
1	(China) Zhu Yuling	11	11	11	11
14	(Sweden) Matilda Ekholm	8	5	7	5
10	(Romania) Elizabeta Samara	9	8	9	6
8	(Austria) Sofia Polcanova	11	11	11	11
7	(Hong Kong) Doo Hoi Kem	6	11	12	11	16	11
12	(Romania) Bernadette Szőcs	11	6	10	6	18	8
15	(Hungary) Georgina Póta	6	8	18	11
4	(Chinese Taipei) Cheng I-ching	11	11	20	13
3	(China) Ding Ning	11	11	11	11
16	(Austria) Liu Jia	7	9	4	7
20	(Australia) Jian Fang Lay	6	4	11	4	11	11	6
6	(South Korea) Seo Hyo-won	11	11	4	11	6	9	11
5	(Japan) Miu Hirano	11	11	11	11
18	(North Korea) Kim Song-i	7	9	5	3
13	(Chinese Taipei) Chen Szu-yu	11	11	7	9	8	7
2	(Japan) Kasumi Ishikawa	4	5	11	11	11	11

Quarterfinals
1	(China) Zhu Yuling	11	14	11	11
8	(Austria) Sofia Polcanova	6	12	8	4
7	(Hong Kong) Doo Hoi Kem	11	11	11	9	6	3
4	(Chinese Taipei) Cheng I-ching	8	9	13	11	11	11
3	(China) Ding Ning	11	11	5	11	11
6	(South Korea) Seo Hyo-won	6	3	11	6	3
8	(Japan) Miu Hirano	11	7	9	6	3
2	(Japan) Kasumi Ishikawa	4	11	11	11	11

Semifinals
1	(China) Zhu Yuling	11	11	11	11	11
4	(Chinese Taipei) Cheng I-ching	6	4	13	5	8
3	(China) Ding Ning	11	11	11	11
2	(Japan) Kasumi Ishikawa	7	5	3	9

Final
1	(China) Zhu Yuling	9	8	10	8
3	(China) Ding Ning	11	11	12	11
Third place
4	(Chinese Taipei) Cheng I-ching	11	11	12	13	11
2	(Japan) Kasumi Ishikawa	8	7	10	15	8

== See also ==
- 2018 World Team Table Tennis Championships
- 2018 ITTF World Tour
- 2018 ITTF World Tour Grand Finals
- 2018 ITTF Men's World Cup
- 2018 ITTF Team World Cup
