= 2018 Europe Top 16 Cup =

Tournament details
- Dates: 3–4 February 2018
- Edition: 47th
- Venue: Salle Omnisport du Pierrier
- Location: Montreux, Switzerland

Champions
- Men's singles: (Germany) Timo Boll
- Women's singles: (Romania) Bernadette Szőcs

The 2018 Europe Top 16 Cup (also referred to as the China Construction Bank 2018 Europe Top 16 Cup for sponsorship reasons) was a table tennis competition held from 3–4 February in Montreux, Switzerland, organised under the authority of the European Table Tennis Union (ETTU). It was the 47th edition of the event, and the third time that it had been held in Switzerland.

Events were held in men's singles and women's singles, and the three medallists in each event qualified for the 2018 Men's and Women's World Cups.

== Medallists ==
Event	Gold	Silver	Bronze
Men's Singles	(Germany) Timo Boll	(Germany) Dimitrij Ovtcharov	(Denmark) Jonathan Groth
Women's Singles	(Romania) Bernadette Szőcs	(Netherlands) Li Jie	(Romania) Elizabeta Samara

== Men's singles ==
=== Players ===
Qualification was based on the European ranking for December 2017, with seedings based on the ranking for February 2018. Lionel Weber qualified as the host nation representative. Portugal's Marcos Freitas also qualified, but withdrew two days before the start of the competition due to injury. His place was taken by Kou Lei of Ukraine.

1. (Germany) Dimitrij Ovtcharov (final)
2. (Germany) Timo Boll (champion)
3. (France) Simon Gauzy (first round)
4. (Sweden) Kristian Karlsson (first round)
5. (Germany) Ruwen Filus (first round)
6. (France) Emmanuel Lebesson (first round)
7. (Ukraine) Kou Lei (first round)
8. (Denmark) Jonathan Groth (semifinals)
9. (Belarus) Vladimir Samsonov (semifinals)
10. (Germany) Bastian Steger (quarterfinals)
11. (Portugal) Tiago Apolónia (first round)
12. (Sweden) Mattias Karlsson (quarterfinals)
13. (Austria) Stefan Fegerl (first round)
14. (Russia) Alexander Shibaev (quarterfinals)
15. (Greece) Panagiotis Gionis (quarterfinals)
16. (Switzerland) Lionel Weber (first round)

=== Draw ===
First round
1	(Germany) Dimitrij Ovtcharov	11	11	11	11
16	(Switzerland) Lionel Weber	9	9	8	5
15	(Greece) Panagiotis Gionis	11	8	15	7	11	12	11
7	(Ukraine) Kou Lei	13	11	13	11	8	10	5
8	(Denmark) Jonathan Groth	11	11	11	7	11
11	(Portugal) Tiago Apolónia	5	9	8	11	7
14	(Russia) Alexander Shibaev	11	11	8	11	5	9	11
3	(France) Simon Gauzy	9	4	11	4	11	11	7
4	(Sweden) Kristian Karlsson	12	11	3	11	7	6	7
9	(Belarus) Vladimir Samsonov	10	9	11	8	11	11	11
12	(Sweden) Mattias Karlsson	8	11	11	11	11
5	(Germany) Ruwen Filus	11	7	7	9	9
6	(France) Emmanuel Lebesson	11	12	7	5	9	4
10	(Germany) Bastian Steger	6	10	11	11	11	11
13	(Austria) Stefan Fegerl	7	11	4	8
2	(Germany) Timo Boll	11	13	11	11

Quarterfinals
1	(Germany) Dimitrij Ovtcharov	11	12	7	11	13
15	(Greece) Panagiotis Gionis	7	10	11	9	11
8	(Denmark) Jonathan Groth	9	11	11	11	12
14	(Russia) Alexander Shibaev	11	6	6	5	10
9	(Belarus) Vladimir Samsonov	11	11	11	10	14
12	(Sweden) Mattias Karlsson	9	8	7	12	12
10	(Germany) Bastian Steger	7	11	5	11	6
2	(Germany) Timo Boll	11	9	11	13	11

Semifinals
1	(Germany) Dimitrij Ovtcharov	12	11	11	9	12
8	(Denmark) Jonathan Groth	10	7	9	11	10
9	(Belarus) Vladimir Samsonov	12	6	4	14	5	10
2	(Germany) Timo Boll	10	11	11	12	11	12

Final
1	(Germany) Dimitrij Ovtcharov	11	6	3	6
2	(Germany) Timo Boll	13	11	11	11
Third place
8	(Denmark) Jonathan Groth	7	11	11	12	4	9	11
9	(Belarus) Vladimir Samsonov	11	9	9	10	11	11	6

== Women's singles ==
=== Players ===
Qualification was based on the European ranking for December 2017, with seedings based on the ranking for February 2018. Rachel Moret qualified as the host nation representative. Turkey's Melek Hu and Germany's Kristin Lang also qualified, but withdrew before the start of the competition, the latter due to having recently given birth. Their places were taken by Tetyana Bilenko of Ukraine and Viktoria Pavlovich of Belarus.

1. (Netherlands) Li Jie (final)
2. (Austria) Sofia Polcanova (quarterfinals)
3. (Romania) Elizabeta Samara (semifinals)
4. (Hungary) Georgina Póta (quarterfinals)
5. (Sweden) Matilda Ekholm (semifinals)
6. (Poland) Li Qian (first round)
7. (Austria) Liu Jia (quarterfinals)
8. (Romania) Bernadette Szőcs (champion)
9. (Russia) Polina Mikhailova (first round)
10. (Belarus) Viktoria Pavlovich (first round)
11. (Luxembourg) Ni Xialian (first round)
12. (Germany) Petrissa Solja (first round)
13. (Germany) Sabine Winter (quarterfinals)
14. (Switzerland) Rachel Moret (first round)
15. (Romania) Daniela Monteiro Dodean (first round)
16. (Ukraine) Tetyana Bilenko (first round)

=== Draw ===
First round
1	(Netherlands) Li Jie	11	11	13	11
9	(Russia) Polina Mikhailova	2	7	11	6
13	(Germany) Sabine Winter	11	9	4	14	11	11
6	(Poland) Li Qian	6	11	11	12	5	5
7	(Austria) Liu Jia	5	11	11	8	11	11
15	(Romania) D. Monteiro Dodean	11	4	8	11	5	6
11	(Luxembourg) Ni Xialian	9	12	11	7	11	11	5
3	(Romania) Elizabeta Samara	11	14	9	11	8	5	11
4	(Hungary) Georgina Póta	11	8	11	13	11
12	(Germany) Petrissa Solja	8	11	6	11	4
16	(Ukraine) Tetyana Bilenko	4	6	12	9
8	(Romania) Bernadette Szőcs	11	11	14	11
5	(Sweden) Matilda Ekholm	11	11	11	11
10	(Belarus) Viktoria Pavlovich	5	8	5	6
14	(Switzerland) Rachel Moret	6	4	8	14	6
2	(Austria) Sofia Polcanova	11	11	11	12	11

Quarterfinals
1	(Netherlands) Li Jie	11	11	10	11	11
13	(Germany) Sabine Winter	5	4	12	5	8
7	(Austria) Liu Jia	4	11	3	7	11
3	(Romania) Elizabeta Samara	11	7	11	11	13
4	(Hungary) Georgina Póta	7	6	5	10
8	(Romania) Bernadette Szőcs	11	11	11	12
5	(Sweden) Matilda Ekholm	11	11	11	11
2	(Austria) Sofia Polcanova	5	6	7	9

Semifinals
1	(Netherlands) Li Jie	13	7	11	11	13
3	(Romania) Elizabeta Samara	11	11	9	6	11
8	(Romania) Bernadette Szőcs	11	11	11	11
5	(Sweden) Matilda Ekholm	7	9	9	9

Final
1	(Netherlands) Li Jie	10	11	6	5	7
8	(Romania) Bernadette Szőcs	12	8	11	11	11
Third place
3	(Romania) Elizabeta Samara	11	8	11	11	4	11
5	(Sweden) Matilda Ekholm	4	11	6	9	11	8

== See also ==
- International Table Tennis Federation
- 2018 ITTF-ATTU Asian Cup
- 2018 ITTF-Oceania Cup
- 2018 ITTF Pan-America Cup
