= 2018 ITTF World Tour Grand Finals =

Tournament details
- Dates: 13–16 December 2018
- Edition: 23rd
- Total prize money: US$1,001,000
- Venue: Namdong Gymnasium
- Location: Incheon, South Korea

Champions
- Men's singles: (Japan) Tomokazu Harimoto
- Women's singles: (China) Chen Meng
- Men's doubles: (South Korea) Jang Woo-jin (South Korea) Lim Jong-hoon
- Women's doubles: (Japan) Hina Hayata (Japan) Mima Ito
- Mixed doubles: (Hong Kong) Wong Chun Ting (Hong Kong) Doo Hoi Kem

The 2018 ITTF World Tour Grand Finals was the final competition of the 2018 ITTF World Tour, the International Table Tennis Federation's professional table tennis world tour. It was the 23rd edition of the competition, and was held from 13–16 December in Incheon, South Korea.

The competition featured events in five categories: men's singles, women's singles, men's doubles, women's doubles and mixed doubles.

== Events ==
Event	Gold	Silver	Bronze
Men's Singles	(Japan) Tomokazu Harimoto	(China) Lin Gaoyuan	(Brazil) Hugo Calderano
Men's Singles	(Japan) Tomokazu Harimoto	(China) Lin Gaoyuan	(Japan) Jun Mizutani
Women's Singles	(China) Chen Meng	(China) He Zhuojia	(China) Ding Ning
Women's Singles	(China) Chen Meng	(China) He Zhuojia	(China) Zhu Yuling
Men's Doubles	(South Korea) Jang Woo-jin (South Korea) Lim Jong-hoon	(Hong Kong) Ho Kwan Kit (Hong Kong) Wong Chun Ting	(South Korea) Jung Young-sik (South Korea) Lee Sang-su
Men's Doubles	(South Korea) Jang Woo-jin (South Korea) Lim Jong-hoon	(Hong Kong) Ho Kwan Kit (Hong Kong) Wong Chun Ting	(Japan) Masataka Morizono (Japan) Yuya Oshima
Women's Doubles	(Japan) Hina Hayata (Japan) Mima Ito	(China) Chen Xingtong (China) Sun Yingsha	(South Korea) Jeon Ji-hee (South Korea) Yang Ha-eun
Women's Doubles	(Japan) Hina Hayata (Japan) Mima Ito	(China) Chen Xingtong (China) Sun Yingsha	(China) Chen Ke (China) Wang Manyu
Mixed Doubles	(Hong Kong) Wong Chun Ting (Hong Kong) Doo Hoi Kem	(South Korea) Jang Woo-jin (North Korea) Cha Hyo-sim	(South Korea) Lim Jong-hoon (South Korea) Yang Ha-eun
Mixed Doubles	(Hong Kong) Wong Chun Ting (Hong Kong) Doo Hoi Kem	(South Korea) Jang Woo-jin (North Korea) Cha Hyo-sim	(Japan) Masataka Morizono (Japan) Mima Ito

== Qualification ==
Players earned points based on their performances in the singles and doubles tournaments at the 12 events of the 2018 ITTF World Tour. The top 16 men's and women's singles players, and the top eight men's, women's and mixed doubles pairs who satisfied the qualification criteria were invited to compete. China's Ma Long qualified for the men's singles event, but withdrew due to injury. His place was taken by Japan's Yuya Oshima.

== Tournament format ==
The singles and doubles tournaments consisted of knockout draws, with 16 players starting each of the singles events and eight pairs starting each of the doubles events. The seedings for the tournament draws were based on final tour standings, not the official ITTF world ranking.

== Men's singles ==
=== Players ===
1. (China) Xu Xin (quarterfinals)
2. (China) Fan Zhendong (quarterfinals)
3. (China) Liang Jingkun (quarterfinals)
4. (Japan) Tomokazu Harimoto (champion)
5. (South Korea) Jang Woo-jin (quarterfinals)
6. (China) Lin Gaoyuan (final)
7. (Brazil) Hugo Calderano (semifinals)
8. (Japan) Jun Mizutani (semifinals)
9. (Germany) Patrick Franziska (first round)
10. (South Korea) Lim Jong-hoon (first round)
11. (South Korea) Lee Sang-su (first round)
12. (Hong Kong) Wong Chun Ting (first round)
13. (China) Liu Dingshuo (first round)
14. (Japan) Koki Niwa (first round)
15. (Germany) Timo Boll (first round)
16. (Japan) Yuya Oshima (first round)

=== Draw ===
First round
1	(China) Xu Xin	11	9	11	11	11
12	(Hong Kong) Wong Chun Ting	6	11	3	8	7
11	(South Korea) Lee Sang-su	7	11	8	9	11	14
6	(China) Lin Gaoyuan	11	9	11	11	7	16
8	(Japan) Jun Mizutani	11	11	11
13	(China) Liu Dingshuo	9	5	4	w/o
15	(Germany) Timo Boll	6	4	7	11
3	(China) Liang Jingkun	11	11	11	13
4	(Japan) Tomokazu Harimoto	11	10	11	11	11
9	(Germany) Patrick Franziska	7	12	8	7	7
10	(South Korea) Lim Jong-hoon	5	3	6	5
5	(South Korea) Jang Woo-jin	11	11	11	11
7	(Brazil) Hugo Calderano	11	4	11	8	9	11	11
16	(Japan) Yuya Oshima	5	11	8	11	11	4	7
14	(Japan) Koki Niwa	6	8	5	10
2	(China) Fan Zhendong	11	11	11	12

Quarterfinals
1	(China) Xu Xin	3	11	11	13	2	9
6	(China) Lin Gaoyuan	11	9	13	11	11	11
8	(Japan) Jun Mizutani	7	11	8	11	11	11
3	(China) Liang Jingkun	11	9	11	3	6	9
4	(Japan) Tomokazu Harimoto	12	11	11	9	11
5	(South Korea) Jang Woo-jin	10	8	7	11	9
7	(Brazil) Hugo Calderano	11	12	4	11	9	11
2	(China) Fan Zhendong	6	10	11	5	11	9

Semifinals
6	(China) Lin Gaoyuan	11	11	11	12
8	(Japan) Jun Mizutani	5	9	6	10
4	(Japan) Tomokazu Harimoto	11	11	11	11
7	(Brazil) Hugo Calderano	7	8	8	5

Final
6	(China) Lin Gaoyuan	4	15	9	9	9
4	(Japan) Tomokazu Harimoto	11	13	11	11	11

== Women's singles ==
=== Players ===
1. (China) Wang Manyu (quarterfinals)
2. (Japan) Kasumi Ishikawa (quarterfinals)
3. (China) Liu Shiwen (quarterfinals)
4. (Japan) Mima Ito (first round)
5. (China) Ding Ning (semifinals)
6. (China) Chen Meng (champion)
7. (China) Zhu Yuling (semifinals)
8. (South Korea) Seo Hyo-won (first round)
9. (Chinese Taipei) Cheng I-ching (quarterfinals)
10. (China) Chen Xingtong (first round)
11. (Japan) Hitomi Sato (first round)
12. (China) He Zhuojia (final)
13. (Japan) Miu Hirano (first round)
14. (China) Sun Yingsha (first round)
15. (Singapore) Feng Tianwei (first round)
16. (Japan) Saki Shibata (first round)

=== Draw ===
First round
1	(China) Wang Manyu	11	10	11	11	11
15	(Singapore) Feng Tianwei	3	12	6	6	5
10	(China) Chen Xingtong	7	11	7	6	11	11	5
6	(China) Chen Meng	11	9	11	11	8	9	11
7	(China) Zhu Yuling	11	11	7	11	11
11	(Japan) Hitomi Sato	5	8	11	1	4
14	(China) Sun Yingsha	11	6	6	6	9
3	(China) Liu Shiwen	8	11	11	11	11
4	(Japan) Mima Ito	9	11	7	11	11	8	7
9	(Chinese Taipei) Cheng I-ching	11	3	11	6	8	11	11
16	(Japan) Saki Shibata	3	6	11	7	5
5	(China) Ding Ning	11	11	7	11	11
8	(South Korea) Seo Hyo-won	5	5	8	4
12	(China) He Zhuojia	11	11	11	11
13	(Japan) Miu Hirano	6	3	11	8	7
2	(Japan) Kasumi Ishikawa	11	11	9	11	11

Quarterfinals
1	(China) Wang Manyu	14	7	12	8	14
6	(China) Chen Meng	16	11	10	11	16
7	(China) Zhu Yuling	11	11	11	11
3	(China) Liu Shiwen	1	6	9	6
9	(Chinese Taipei) Cheng I-ching	6	7	9	1
5	(China) Ding Ning	11	11	11	11
12	(China) He Zhuojia	11	11	11	14	9	7	11
2	(Japan) Kasumi Ishikawa	4	9	13	12	11	11	9

Semifinals
6	(China) Chen Meng	9	11	11	5	13	11
7	(China) Zhu Yuling	11	6	5	11	11	3
5	(China) Ding Ning	14	11	17	4	6	5
12	(China) He Zhuojia	12	9	19	11	11	11

Final
6	(China) Chen Meng	9	11	11	12	11
12	(China) He Zhuojia	11	5	8	10	7

== Men's doubles ==
=== Players ===
1. (South Korea) Jung Young-sik / (South Korea) Lee Sang-su (semifinals)
2. (Japan) Masataka Morizono / (Japan) Yuya Oshima (semifinals)
3. (Hong Kong) Ho Kwan Kit / (Hong Kong) Wong Chun Ting (final)
4. (Chinese Taipei) Liao Cheng-ting / (Chinese Taipei) Lin Yun-ju (quarterfinals)
5. (South Korea) Jang Woo-jin / (South Korea) Lim Jong-hoon (champions)
6. (Chinese Taipei) Chen Chien-an / (Chinese Taipei) Chuang Chih-yuan (quarterfinals)
7. (Hong Kong) Lam Siu Hang / (Hong Kong) Ng Pak Nam (quarterfinals)
8. (Hungary) Nándor Ecseki / (Hungary) Ádám Szudi (quarterfinals)

=== Draw ===
Quarterfinals
1	(South Korea) Jung Young-sik (South Korea) Lee Sang-su	11	11	11
7	(Hong Kong) Lam Siu Hang (Hong Kong) Ng Pak Nam	7	7	3
5	(South Korea) Jang Woo-jin (South Korea) Lim Jong-hoon	11	11	11
4	(Chinese Taipei) Liao Cheng-ting (Chinese Taipei) Lin Yun-ju	9	1	9
3	(Hong Kong) Ho Kwan Kit (Hong Kong) Wong Chun Ting	11	11	8	11
6	(Chinese Taipei) Chen Chien-an (Chinese Taipei) Chuang Chih-yuan	2	2	11	9
8	(Hungary) Nándor Ecseki (Hungary) Ádám Szudi	5	8	5
2	(Japan) Masataka Morizono (Japan) Yuya Oshima	11	11	11

Semifinals
1	(South Korea) Jung Young-sik (South Korea) Lee Sang-su	9	11	13	9
5	(South Korea) Jang Woo-jin (South Korea) Lim Jong-hoon	11	8	15	11
3	(Hong Kong) Ho Kwan Kit (Hong Kong) Wong Chun Ting	11	11	5	11
2	(Japan) Masataka Morizono (Japan) Yuya Oshima	9	3	11	4

Final
5	(South Korea) Jang Woo-jin (South Korea) Lim Jong-hoon	10	13	11	10	11
3	(Hong Kong) Ho Kwan Kit (Hong Kong) Wong Chun Ting	12	11	8	12	8

== Women's doubles ==
=== Players ===
1. (Japan) Hina Hayata / (Japan) Mima Ito (champions)
2. (China) Chen Xingtong / (China) Sun Yingsha (final)
3. (South Korea) Jeon Ji-hee / (South Korea) Yang Ha-eun (semifinals)
4. (China) Chen Ke / (China) Wang Manyu (semifinals)
5. (China) Liu Gaoyang / (China) Zhang Rui (quarterfinals)
6. (Hong Kong) Doo Hoi Kem / (Hong Kong) Lee Ho Ching (quarterfinals)
7. (Japan) Honoka Hashimoto / (Japan) Hitomi Sato (quarterfinals)
8. (Hong Kong) Ng Wing Nam / (Hong Kong) Soo Wai Yam Minnie (quarterfinals)

=== Draw ===
Quarterfinals
1	(Japan) Hina Hayata (Japan) Mima Ito	11	11	11
5	(China) Liu Gaoyang (China) Zhang Rui	6	9	9
6	(Hong Kong) Doo Hoi Kem (Hong Kong) Lee Ho Ching	11	9	4	9
3	(South Korea) Jeon Ji-hee (South Korea) Yang Ha-eun	7	11	11	11
4	(China) Chen Ke (China) Wang Manyu	11	14	11
7	(Japan) Honoka Hashimoto (Japan) Hitomi Sato	7	12	9
8	(Hong Kong) Ng Wing Nam (Hong Kong) Soo Wai Yam Minnie	6	4	6
2	(China) Chen Xingtong (China) Sun Yingsha	11	11	11

Semifinals
1	(Japan) Hina Hayata (Japan) Mima Ito	12	3	9	12	11
3	(South Korea) Jeon Ji-hee (South Korea) Yang Ha-eun	10	11	11	10	6
4	(China) Chen Ke (China) Wang Manyu	2	11	11	11	8
2	(China) Chen Xingtong (China) Sun Yingsha	11	5	13	7	11

Final
1	(Japan) Hina Hayata (Japan) Mima Ito	11	13	12
2	(China) Chen Xingtong (China) Sun Yingsha	9	11	10

== Mixed doubles ==
=== Players ===
1. (South Korea) Lee Sang-su / (South Korea) Jeon Ji-hee (quarterfinals)
2. (South Korea) Jang Woo-jin / (North Korea) Cha Hyo-sim (final)
3. (Chinese Taipei) Chen Chien-an / (Chinese Taipei) Cheng I-ching (quarterfinals)
4. (South Korea) Lim Jong-hoon / (South Korea) Yang Ha-eun (semifinals)
5. (Japan) Maharu Yoshimura / (Japan) Kasumi Ishikawa (quarterfinals)
6. (Japan) Masataka Morizono / (Japan) Mima Ito (semifinals)
7. (Hong Kong) Wong Chun Ting / (Hong Kong) Doo Hoi Kem (champions)
8. (Slovakia) Ľubomír Pištej / (Slovakia) Barbora Balážová (quarterfinals)

=== Draw ===
Quarterfinals
1	(South Korea) Lee Sang-su (South Korea) Jeon Ji-hee	11	7	9	10
6	(Japan) Masataka Morizono (Japan) Mima Ito	9	11	11	12
7	(Hong Kong) Wong Chun Ting (Hong Kong) Doo Hoi Kem	11	10	11	8	11
3	(Chinese Taipei) Chen Chien-an (Chinese Taipei) Cheng I-ching	6	12	2	11	9
4	(South Korea) Lim Jong-hoon (South Korea) Yang Ha-eun	11	11	12
8	(Slovakia) Ľubomír Pištej (Slovakia) Barbora Balážová	6	7	10
5	(Japan) Maharu Yoshimura (Japan) Kasumi Ishikawa	10	11	5	11	5
2	(South Korea) Jang Woo-jin (North Korea) Cha Hyo-sim	12	8	11	9	11

Semifinals
6	(Japan) Masataka Morizono (Japan) Mima Ito	9	16	12	1	2
7	(Hong Kong) Wong Chun Ting (Hong Kong) Doo Hoi Kem	11	14	10	11	11
4	(South Korea) Lim Jong-hoon (South Korea) Yang Ha-eun	12	4	8	11	8
2	(South Korea) Jang Woo-jin (North Korea) Cha Hyo-sim	10	11	11	5	11

Final
7	(Hong Kong) Wong Chun Ting (Hong Kong) Doo Hoi Kem	11	11	11
2	(South Korea) Jang Woo-jin (North Korea) Cha Hyo-sim	6	8	4

== ITTF Star Awards ==
The 2018 ITTF Star Awards ceremony was held at the Grand Hyatt Hotel in Incheon on 12 December.

Awards were handed out in seven categories:

- Male Table Tennis Star: (China) Fan Zhendong
- Female Table Tennis Star: (China) Ding Ning
- Male Para Table Tennis Star: (Spain) Jordi Morales
- Female Para Table Tennis Star: (Netherlands) Kelly van Zon
- Table Tennis Star Coach: (Italy) Massimo Costantini
- Table Tennis Breakthrough Star: (India) Manika Batra
- Table Tennis Star Point: (China) Xu Xin (versus Stefan Fegerl at the 2018 World Team Championships)

== See also ==
- 2018 World Team Table Tennis Championships
- 2018 ITTF Team World Cup
- 2018 ITTF Men's World Cup
- 2018 ITTF Women's World Cup
