= Michelle Bromley =

Australian table tennis player

Personal information
- Nationality: Australia
- Born: 24 December 1987 (age 38) Blacktown, Australia

Sport
- Sport: Table tennis

Michelle Bromley (born 24 December 1987) is an Australian table tennis player.

She competed in the 2020 Summer Olympics. She lost to Natalia Partyka of Poland 4-0 in the first round. She also competed with Jian Fang Lay and Melissa Tapper in the women's team event but were defeated by Germany 3-0 in the round of 16.
