= Bastian Steger =

German table tennis player

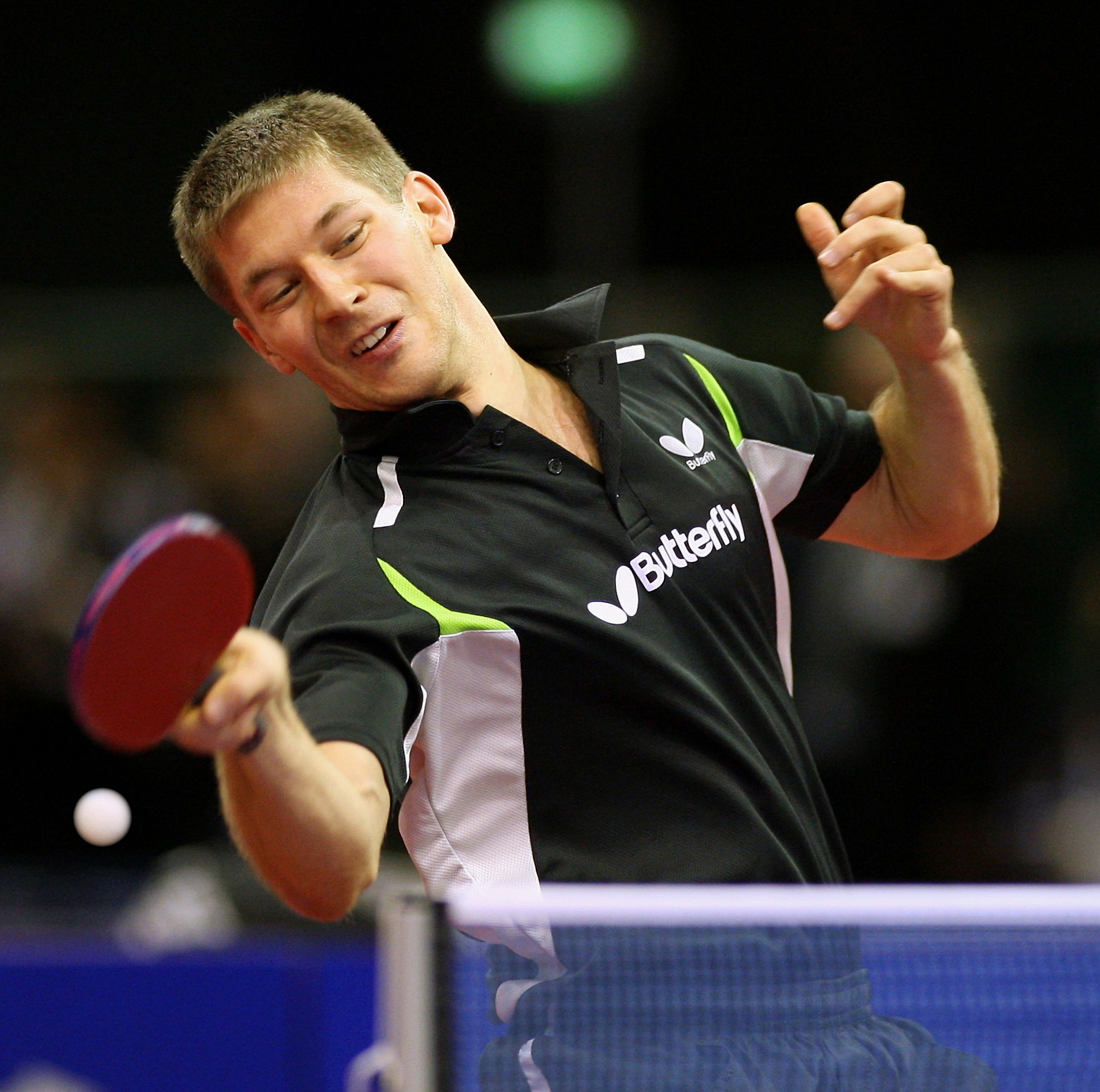

Personal information
- Nationality: German
- Born: 19 March 1981 (age 45) Oberviechtach, West Germany
- Height: 1.70 m (5 ft 7 in)
- Weight: 65 kg (143 lb)

Sport
- Sport: Table tennis
- Playing style: Right-handed, shakehand grip
- Equipment: Butterfly Innerforce Layer ZLF blade; Butterfly Tenergy 05 (Red, FH), Butterfly Tenergy 05 (Black, BH)
- Highest ranking: 18 (October 2014)
Medal record
Men's table tennis
Representing Germany
Olympic Games
Bronze medal – third place	2012 London	Team
Bronze medal – third place	2016 Rio de Janeiro	Team
World Championships
Silver medal – second place	2018 Halmstad	Team
European Championships
Bronze medal – third place	2012 Herning	Singles

Bastian Steger (born 19 March 1981) is a German table tennis player. He competed for Germany at the 2012 Summer Olympics where he won a bronze medal in the team event. He also won the bronze medal in the men's team event during the 2016 Summer Olympics in Rio de Janeiro.
