= 2018 World Team Table Tennis Championships =

2018 edition of the World Team Table Tennis Championships

- Venue: Halmstad Arena
- Location: Halmstad, Sweden
- Dates: 29 April–6 May
- Competitors: 595 from 87 nations

Champions
- Men: China
- Women: China

The 2018 World Team Table Tennis Championships were held in Halmstad, Sweden from 29 April to 6 May 2018.

The quarterfinal between North Korea and South Korea in the women's tournament did not take place, as the teams chose to continue as a united team

== Seeding ==
The top fourteen teams of the first division and the top two teams of the second division at the 2016 World Team Championships were guaranteed a place in the first division, along with top eight placed teams in the world rankings not already qualified.

Qualification	Men's team	Women's team
Top fourteen in 2016	China; Japan; England; South Korea; France; Hong Kong; Portugal Sweden; Austria; Croatia; North Korea; Poland; Czech Republic; Germany	China; Japan; North Korea; Chinese Taipei; Hong Kong; Germany; Netherlands Singapore; Austria; Romania; South Korea; Ukraine; Hungary; Thailand
Top two of the 2nd division in 2016	India; Brazil	India; Luxembourg
ITTF world team ranking	Chinese Taipei; Belgium; Russia; Egypt; Romania; Belarus; Singapore; Slovenia	Russia; Poland; Egypt; Belarus; Brazil; Czech Republic; United States; Sweden

== Medal summary ==
=== Medal table ===
* Host nation (Sweden)

Rank	Nation	Gold	Silver	Bronze	Total
1	China (CHN)	2	0	0	2
2	Germany (GER)	0	1	0	1
2	Japan (JPN)	0	1	0	1
4	Hong Kong (HKG)	0	0	1	1
4	Korea (COR)	0	0	1	1
4	South Korea (KOR)	0	0	1	1
4	Sweden (SWE)*	0	0	1	1
Totals (7 entries)		2	2	4	8

=== Medalists ===
Event	Gold	Silver	Bronze
Men's team	China; Fan Zhendong; Lin Gaoyuan; Ma Long; Wang Chuqin; Xu Xin	Germany; Timo Boll; Ruwen Filus; Patrick Franziska; Dimitrij Ovtcharov; Bastian Steger	South Korea; Jang Woo-jin; Jung Young-sik; Kim Dong-hyun; Lee Sang-su; Lim Jong-hoon
Men's team	China; Fan Zhendong; Lin Gaoyuan; Ma Long; Wang Chuqin; Xu Xin	Germany; Timo Boll; Ruwen Filus; Patrick Franziska; Dimitrij Ovtcharov; Bastian Steger	Sweden; Anton Källberg; Kristian Karlsson; Mattias Karlsson; Truls Möregårdh; Jon Persson
Women's team	China; Chen Meng; Ding Ning; Liu Shiwen; Wang Manyu; Zhu Yuling	Japan; Hina Hayata; Miu Hirano; Kasumi Ishikawa; Mima Ito; Miyu Nagasaki	Hong Kong; Doo Hoi Kem; Lee Ho Ching; Mak Tze Wing; Ng Wing Nam; Soo Wai Yam Minnie
Women's team	China; Chen Meng; Ding Ning; Liu Shiwen; Wang Manyu; Zhu Yuling	Japan; Hina Hayata; Miu Hirano; Kasumi Ishikawa; Mima Ito; Miyu Nagasaki	Korea; Cha Hyo-sim; Choe Hyon-hwa; Jeon Ji-hee; Kim Ji-ho; Kim Nam-hae; Kim Song-i; Seo Hyo-won; Yang Ha-eun; Yoo Eun-chong

== See also ==
- 2018 ITTF World Tour
- 2018 ITTF World Tour Grand Finals
- 2018 ITTF Team World Cup
- 2018 ITTF Men's World Cup
- 2018 ITTF Women's World Cup
