= 2018 ITTF Men's World Cup =

2018 ITTF oten's World Cup
- Venue: Disneyland Paris
- Location: Paris, France
- Date: 19–21 October
- Competitors: 20 from 14 nations
- Website: tt2018paris.com

Medalists
gold medal	(China) Fan Zhendong
silver medal	(Germany) Timo Boll
bronze medal	(China) Lin Gaoyuan

The 2018 ITTF Men's World Cup was a table tennis competition held in Paris, France, from 19 to 21 October 2018. It was the 39th edition of the ITTF-sanctioned event, and the third time that it had been staged in Paris.

In the final, China's Fan Zhendong defeated Timo Boll of Germany, 4–1, to win his second World Cup title.

== Qualification ==
In total, 20 players qualified for the World Cup:

- 18 players from the five Continental Cups held during 2018
- A host association representative
- A wild card, selected by the ITTF

A maximum of two players from each association could qualify.

As reigning World Champion, China's Ma Long was invited to take part, but withdrew prior to the event. His place was taken by Lin Gaoyuan.

Means of qualification	Date	Venue	Places	Qualified players
2018 Europe Top 16 Cup	3–4 February 2018	(Switzerland) Montreux	3	(Germany) Timo Boll (Germany) Dimitrij Ovtcharov (Denmark) Jonathan Groth
2018 ITTF Africa Top 16 Cup	1–3 March 2018	(Kenya) Nairobi	1	(Nigeria) Quadri Aruna (Note: Egypt's Omar Assar won the Africa Cup, but Quadri Aruna (as runner-up) qualified for the World Cup as the Africa Cup representative when Assar withdrew.)
2018 ITTF-ATTU Asian Cup	6–8 April 2018	(Japan) Yokohama	3	(China) Fan Zhendong (China) Lin Gaoyuan (South Korea) Lee Sang-su
2018 ITTF-Oceania Cup	18–19 May 2018	(Vanuatu) Port Vila	1	(Australia) Hu Heming
2018 ITTF Pan-America Cup	15–17 June 2018	(Paraguay) Asunción	2	(Brazil) Hugo Calderano (Brazil) Gustavo Tsuboi
Additional qualifiers (Note: Based on Continental Cup finishing position and ITTF World Ranking on 1 July 2018.)	n/a	n/a	8	(South Korea) Jeong Sang-eun (Japan) Tomokazu Harimoto (Japan) Koki Niwa (Hong Kong) Wong Chun Ting (Belarus) Vladimir Samsonov (Sweden) Mattias Falck (United States) Kanak Jha (Greece) Panagiotis Gionis
Host association representative	n/a	n/a	1	(France) Simon Gauzy
ITTF wild card	n/a	n/a	1	(France) Emmanuel Lebesson
Total			20	

== Competition format ==
The tournament consisted of two stages: a preliminary group stage and a knockout stage. The players seeded 9 to 20 were drawn into four groups, with three players in each group. The top two players from each group joined the top eight seeded players in the second stage of the competition, which consisted of a knockout draw.

== Seeding ==
The seeding list was based on the official ITTF world ranking for October 2018.

1. (China) Fan Zhendong (champion)
2. (Germany) Timo Boll (final)
3. (Germany) Dimitrij Ovtcharov (semifinals)
4. (China) Lin Gaoyuan (semifinals)
5. (South Korea) Lee Sang-su (quarterfinals)
6. (Japan) Tomokazu Harimoto (quarterfinals)
7. (Hong Kong) Wong Chun Ting (first round)
8. (Japan) Koki Niwa (quarterfinals)
9. (Brazil) Hugo Calderano (preliminary round)
10. (France) Simon Gauzy (first round)
11. (South Korea) Jeong Sang-eun (first round)
12. (Denmark) Jonathan Groth (first round)
13. (Sweden) Mattias Falck (first round)
14. (Nigeria) Quadri Aruna (preliminary round)
15. (Belarus) Vladimir Samsonov (quarterfinals)
16. (Brazil) Gustavo Tsuboi (first round)
17. (France) Emmanuel Lebesson (first round)
18. (United States) Kanak Jha (first round)
19. (Greece) Panagiotis Gionis (preliminary round)
20. (Australia) Hu Heming (preliminary round)

== Preliminary stage ==
The preliminary group stage took place on 19 October, with the top two players in each group progressing to the main draw.

	Group A	(Belarus) Samsonov	(France) Lebesson	(Brazil) Calderano	Points
15	(Belarus) V. Samsonov		4–2	4–1	4
17	(France) E. Lebesson	2–4		4–3	3
9	(Brazil) Hugo Calderano	1–4	3–4		2

	Group B	(France) Gauzy	(United States) Jha	(Nigeria) Aruna	Points
10	(France) Simon Gauzy		4–0	4–3	4
18	(United States) Kanak Jha	0–4		4–2	3
14	(Nigeria) Quadri Aruna	3–4	2–4		2

	Group C	(South Korea) Jeong	(Brazil) Tsuboi	(Greece) Gionis	Points
11	(South Korea) Jeong Sang-eun		4–0	4–1	4
16	(Brazil) Gustavo Tsuboi	0–4		4–1	3
19	(Greece) Panagiotis Gionis	1–4	1–4		2

	Group D	(Denmark) Groth	(Sweden) Falck	(Australia) Hu	Points
12	(Denmark) Jonathan Groth		4–3	4–0	4
13	(Sweden) Mattias Falck	3–4		4–0	3
20	(Australia) Hu Heming	0–4	0–4		2

== Main draw ==
The knockout stage took place from 20–21 October.

First round
1	(China) Fan Zhendong	11	11	11	11
16	(Brazil) Gustavo Tsuboi	7	9	6	8
15	(Belarus) Vladimir Samsonov	11	12	11	7	11
7	(Hong Kong) Wong Chun Ting	6	10	9	11	7
8	(Japan) Koki Niwa	11	11	4	12	11
12	(Denmark) Jonathan Groth	8	5	11	10	5
18	(United States) Kanak Jha	8	11	7	6	3
4	(China) Lin Gaoyuan	11	6	11	11	11
3	(Germany) Dimitrij Ovtcharov	11	4	7	13	11	5	12
13	(Sweden) Mattias Falck	5	11	11	11	3	11	10
10	(France) Simon Gauzy	6	11	11	7	11	8	8
5	(South Korea) Lee Sang-su	11	4	6	11	6	11	11
6	(Japan) Tomokazu Harimoto	11	11	11	11
11	(South Korea) Jeong Sang-eun	6	6	7	7
17	(France) Emmanuel Lebesson	8	11	8	5	7
2	(Germany) Timo Boll	11	8	11	11	11

Quarterfinals
1	(China) Fan Zhendong	11	11	12	11
15	(Belarus) Vladimir Samsonov	3	6	10	6
8	(Japan) Koki Niwa	10	11	12	9	5
4	(China) Lin Gaoyuan	12	5	14	11	11
3	(Germany) Dimitrij Ovtcharov	11	11	11	9	5	11	11
5	(South Korea) Lee Sang-su	7	5	13	11	11	5	5
6	(Japan) Tomokazu Harimoto	11	3	11	5	9
2	(Germany) Timo Boll	9	11	13	11	11

Semifinals
1	(China) Fan Zhendong	10	12	15	11	11
4	(China) Lin Gaoyuan	12	10	13	7	6
3	(Germany) Dimitrij Ovtcharov	14	7	13	11	11	5
2	(Germany) Timo Boll	12	11	15	9	13	11

Final
1	(China) Fan Zhendong	11	11	11	9	11
2	(Germany) Timo Boll	9	5	6	11	8
Third place
4	(China) Lin Gaoyuan	11	11	9	11	11
3	(Germany) Dimitrij Ovtcharov	7	9	11	4	3

== See also ==
- 2018 World Team Table Tennis Championships
- 2018 ITTF World Tour
- 2018 ITTF World Tour Grand Finals
- 2018 ITTF Women's World Cup
- 2018 ITTF Team World Cup
