= 2018 ITTF Pan-America Cup =

South American table tennis competition

Tournament details
- Dates: 15–17 June 2018
- Edition: 2nd
- Total prize money: US$16,000
- Venue: Centro de Entrenamiento Olímpico
- Location: Asunción, Paraguay

Champions
- Men's singles: (Brazil) Hugo Calderano
- Women's singles: (Canada) Zhang Mo

The 2018 ITTF Pan-America Cup was a table tennis competition that took place from 15–17 June in Asunción, Paraguay. The event was organised by the Paraguay Table Tennis Federation, under the authority of the International Table Tennis Federation (ITTF). It was the second edition of the event.

Men's singles and women's singles events were held, with the winners and runners-up in each event qualifying automatically for the 2018 Men's and Women's World Cups.

== Medallists ==
Event	Gold	Silver	Bronze
Men's Singles	(Brazil) Hugo Calderano	(Brazil) Gustavo Tsuboi	(United States) Kanak Jha
Women's Singles	(Canada) Zhang Mo	(United States) Yue Wu	(Brazil) Bruna Takahashi

== Men's singles ==
=== Seeding ===
Players were seeded according to the June 2018 ITTF World Ranking.

1. (Brazil) Hugo Calderano
2. (Brazil) Gustavo Tsuboi
3. (United States) Kanak Jha
4. (Paraguay) Marcelo Aguirre
5. (Argentina) Horacio Cifuentes
6. (Mexico) Marcos Madrid
7. (Chile) Gustavo Gomez
8. (Ecuador) Alberto Miño
9. (Argentina) Gaston Alto
10. (Dominican Republic) ~~Emil Santos~~ (replaced by (Paraguay) Axel Gavilán)
11. (Puerto Rico) Brian Afanador
12. (Canada) Marko Medjugorac
13. (Dominican Republic) Samuel Gálvez
14. (Canada) Edward Ly
15. (Guatemala) Héctor Gatica
16. (United States) Feng Yijun

=== Group stage ===
	Group 1	(Argentina) Cifuentes	(Dominican Republic) Gálvez	(Guatemala) Gatica	Points
5	(Argentina) H. Cifuentes		w/o	4–0	4
13	(Dominican Republic) Samuel Gálvez	w/d		w/d	-
15	(Guatemala) Héctor Gatica	0–4	w/o		3

	Group 2	(Mexico) Madrid	(Puerto Rico) Afanador	(United States) Feng	Points
6	(Mexico) Marcos Madrid		4–2	3–4	3
11	(Puerto Rico) Brian Afanador	2–4		4–1	3
16	(United States) Feng Yijun	4–3	1–4		3

	Group 3	(Chile) Gomez	(Canada) Medjugorac	(Paraguay) Gavilán	Points
7	(Chile) Gustavo Gomez		4–2	4–2	4
12	(Canada) M. Medjugorac	2–4		2–4	2
-	(Paraguay) Axel Gavilán	2–4	4–2		3

	Group 4	(Ecuador) Miño	(Argentina) Alto	(Canada) Ly	Points
8	(Ecuador) Alberto Miño		4–2	4–2	4
9	(Argentina) Gaston Alto	2–4		4–2	3
14	(Canada) Edward Ly	2–4	2–4		2

=== Main draw ===
Quarterfinals
1	(Brazil) Hugo Calderano	13	14	11	11
7	(Chile) Gustavo Gomez	11	12	8	5
5	(Argentina) Horacio Cifuentes	11	11	11	7	8	6	9
4	(Paraguay) Marcelo Aguirre	7	9	8	11	11	11	11
3	(United States) Kanak Jha	11	12	7	11	11	12
11	(Puerto Rico) Brian Afanador	9	14	11	6	8	10
8	(Ecuador) Alberto Miño	11	11	11	6	7	7	6
2	(Brazil) Gustavo Tsuboi	9	8	8	11	11	11	11

Semifinals
1	(Brazil) Hugo Calderano	11	11	11	11
4	(Paraguay) Marcelo Aguirre	6	4	2	9
3	(United States) Kanak Jha	4	8	8	4
2	(Brazil) Gustavo Tsuboi	11	11	11	11

Final
1	(Brazil) Hugo Calderano	11	8	10	11	11	15
2	(Brazil) Gustavo Tsuboi	9	11	12	6	7	13
Third place
4	(Paraguay) Marcelo Aguirre	6	13	10	11	11	6
3	(United States) Kanak Jha	11	15	12	5	9	11

== Women's singles ==
=== Seeding ===
Players were seeded according to the June 2018 ITTF World Ranking.

1. (Canada) Zhang Mo
2. (United States) Yue Wu
3. (Chile) Paulina Vega
4. (Brazil) Bruna Takahashi
5. (Chile) Daniela Ortega
6. (Colombia) Paula Medina
7. (Argentina) Ana Codina
8. (Dominican Republic) ~~Eva Brito~~ (replaced by (Argentina) Camila Arguelles)
9. (Puerto Rico) Melanie Díaz
10. (Brazil) Caroline Kumahara
11. (Mexico) Yadira Silva
12. (Canada) Alicia Côté
13. (El Salvador) Estefania Ramirios
14. (El Salvador) Emme Arias
15. (United States) Wang Xinyue
16. (Paraguay) Lucero Ovelar

=== Group stage ===
	Group 1	(Chile) Ortega	(Mexico) Silva	(Paraguay) Ovelar	Points
5	(Chile) Daniela Ortega		0–4	4–1	3
11	(Mexico) Yadira Silva	4–0		4–1	4
16	(Paraguay) Lucero Ovelar	1–4	1–4		2

	Group 2	(Colombia) Medina	(El Salvador) Ramirios	(Argentina) Arguelles	Points
6	(Colombia) Paula Medina		1–4 (ret.)	1–4	1
13	(El Salvador) E. Ramirios	4–1		3–4	3
-	(Argentina) C. Arguelles	4–1	4–3		4

	Group 3	(Argentina) Codina	(Brazil) Kumahara	(El Salvador) Arias	Points
7	(Argentina) Ana Codina		0–4	4–0	3
10	(Brazil) C. Kumahara	4–0		4–0	4
14	(El Salvador) Emme Arias	0–4	0–4		2

	Group 4	(Puerto Rico) Melanie Díaz	(Canada) Côté	(United States) Wang	Points
9	(Puerto Rico) Melanie Díaz		4–1	3–4	3
12	(Canada) Alicia Côté	1–4		0–4	2
15	(United States) Wang Xinyue	4–3	4–0		4

=== Main draw ===
Quarterfinals
1	(Canada) Zhang Mo	6	11	11	11	11
15	(United States) Wang Xinyue	11	8	7	4	1
-	(Argentina) Camila Arguelles	5	6	11	5	1
4	(Brazil) Bruna Takahashi	11	11	9	11	11
3	(Chile) Paulina Vega	6	9	8	13	4
11	(Mexico) Yadira Silva	11	11	11	11	11
10	(Brazil) Caroline Kumahara	6	12	8	6	6
2	(United States) Yue Wu	11	10	11	11	11

Semifinals
1	(Canada) Zhang Mo	11	11	11	11
4	(Brazil) Bruna Takahashi	8	9	4	9
11	(Mexico) Yadira Silva	12	6	11	3	10	6
2	(United States) Yue Wu	10	11	7	11	12	11

Final
1	(Canada) Zhang Mo	8	11	11	11	13
2	(United States) Yue Wu	11	8	4	5	11
Third place
4	(Brazil) Bruna Takahashi	17	11	11	9	11
11	(Mexico) Yadira Silva	15	6	2	11	9

== See also ==
- 2018 Pan American Table Tennis Championships
- 2018 Europe Top 16 Cup
- 2018 ITTF-ATTU Asian Cup
- 2018 ITTF-Oceania Cup
