= 2018 ITTF-ATTU Asian Cup =

Tournament details
- Dates: 6–8 April 2018
- Edition: 31st
- Total prize money: US$100,000
- Venue: Yokohama Cultural Gymnasium
- Location: Yokohama, Japan

Champions
- Men's singles: (China) Fan Zhendong
- Women's singles: (China) Zhu Yuling

The 2018 ITTF-ATTU Asian Cup (also known as the 2018 Lion ITTF-ATTU Asian Cup for sponsorship reasons) was a table tennis competition that took place from 6–8 April in Yokohama, Japan. The event was organised by the Japan Table Tennis Association (JTTA), under the authority of the International Table Tennis Federation (ITTF) and the Asian Table Tennis Union (ATTU). It was the 31st edition of the event, and the third time that it had been held in Japan.

Men's singles and women's singles events were held, and the three medallists in each event qualified automatically for the 2018 Men's and Women's World Cups.

== Medalists ==
| Event | Gold | Silver | Bronze |
|---|---|---|---|
| Men's Singles | (China) Fan Zhendong | (China) Lin Gaoyuan | (South Korea) Lee Sang-su |
| Women's Singles | (China) Zhu Yuling | (China) Chen Meng | (Japan) Kasumi Ishikawa |

== Qualification ==
In both the men's and women's singles events, the reigning Asian Champion and Asian Cup Champion qualified, along with the 10 highest-ranked Asian players in the January 2018 ITTF World Ranking. The final four places were awarded to regional representatives from Middle Asia, South Asia, Southeast Asia and West Asia. Qualification was subject to a maximum of two players from any association.

Men's singles

| Player | Qualification |
|---|---|
| Lin Gaoyuan (CHN) | 2017 Asian Cup Champion |
| Fan Zhendong (CHN) | 2017 Asian Champion |
| Koki Niwa (JPN) | WR 6 |
| Wong Chun Ting (HKG) | WR 7 |
| Tomokazu Harimoto (JPN) | WR 11 |
| Lee Sang-su (KOR) | WR 14 |
| Chuang Chih-yuan (TPE) | WR 15 |
| Chen Chien-an (TPE) | WR 29 |
| Jeong Sang-eun (KOR) | WR 30 |
| Jiang Tianyi (HKG) | WR 35 |
| Kirill Gerassimenko (KAZ) | WR 48 |
| Noshad Alamian (IRI) | WR 74 |
| Manav Vikash Thakkar (IND) | South Asia Rep. (WR 257) |
| Nima Alamian (IRI) | Middle Asia Rep. (WR 96) |
| Padasak Tanviriyavechakul (THA) | Southeast Asia Rep. (WR 142) |
| Abdulaziz Al-Abbad (KSA) | West Asia Rep. (WR 176) |

Women's singles

| Player | Qualification |
|---|---|
| Zhu Yuling (CHN) | 2017 Asian Cup Champion |
| Miu Hirano (JPN) | 2017 Asian Champion |
| Chen Meng (CHN) | WR 1 |
| Kasumi Ishikawa (JPN) | WR 4 |
| Cheng I-ching (TPE) | WR 7 |
| Doo Hoi Kem (HKG) | WR 9 |
| Lee Ho Ching (HKG) | WR 12 |
| Chen Szu-yu (TPE) | WR 16 |
| Seo Hyo-won (KOR) | WR 18 |
| Yang Ha-eun (KOR) | WR 27 |
| Suthasini Sawettabut (THA) | WR 48 |
| Nanthana Komwong (THA) | WR 78 |
| Ayhika Mukherjee (IND) | South Asia Rep. (WR 112) |
| Neda Shahsavari (IRI) | Middle Asia Rep. (WR 150) |
| Mai Hoàng Mỹ Trang (VIE) | Southeast Asia Rep. (WR 156) |
| ~~Mariana Sahakian (LBN)~~ | West Asia Rep. (WR 277) |

== Format ==
The first stage of both the men's and women's singles competitions consisted of four groups playing a round robin system, where each player played the other players in their group once. The top two players in Groups A, B and C qualified directly to the second stage. The third player from Groups A, B and C joined the winner of the Continental Group in play-off matches to decide the final two places in the second stage.

The second stage consisted of a single knockout draw to decide the top eight positions.

== Men's singles ==
=== Seeding ===
Players were seeded according to the April 2018 ITTF World Ranking.

1. (China) Fan Zhendong
2. (China) Lin Gaoyuan
3. (Hong Kong) Wong Chun Ting
4. (South Korea) Lee Sang-su
5. (Japan) Koki Niwa
6. (Japan) Tomokazu Harimoto
7. (Chinese Taipei) Chuang Chih-yuan
8. (South Korea) Jeong Sang-eun
9. (Chinese Taipei) Chen Chien-an
10. (Kazakhstan) Kirill Gerassimenko
11. (Hong Kong) Jiang Tianyi
12. (Iran) Noshad Alamian
13. (Iran) Nima Alamian
14. (Thailand) Padasak Tanviriyavechakul
15. (Saudi Arabia) Abdulaziz Al-Abbad
16. (India) Manav Vikash Thakkar

=== Group stage ===
The group stage took place on 6 April.

Group A

| Pos. | Player | (Japan); Harimoto | (China); Fan | (Chinese Taipei); Chuang | (Kazakhstan); Gerassimenko | Points | Qualification |
| 1 | (Japan) Tomokazu Harimoto | — | 3–1 | 3–1 | 3–1 | 6 | Advance to second stage |
| 2 | (China) Fan Zhendong | 1–3 | — | 3–0 | 3–0 | 5 | Advance to second stage |
| 3 | (Chinese Taipei) Chuang Chih-yuan | 1–3 | 0–3 | — | 3–2 | 4 | Advance to play-off |
| 4 | (Kazakhstan) Kirill Gerassimenko | 1–3 | 0–3 | 2–3 | — | 3 | |

Group B

| Pos. | Player | (South Korea); Lee | (China); Lin | (Chinese Taipei); Chen | (Hong Kong); Jiang | Points | Qualification |
| 1 | (South Korea) Lee Sang-su | — | 3–0 | 3–1 | 3–1 | 6 | Advance to second stage |
| 2 | (China) Lin Gaoyuan | 0–3 | — | 3–0 | 3–0 | 5 | Advance to second stage |
| 3 | (Chinese Taipei) Chen Chien-an | 1–3 | 0–3 | — | 3–1 | 4 | Advance to play-off |
| 4 | (Hong Kong) Jiang Tianyi | 1–3 | 0–3 | 1–3 | — | 3 | |

Group C

| Pos. | Player | (Hong Kong); Wong | (Japan); Niwa | (South Korea); Jeong | (Iran); Alamian | Points | Qualification |
| 1 | (Hong Kong) Wong Chun Ting | — | 3–2 | 3–0 | 3–1 | 6 | Advance to second stage |
| 2 | (Japan) Koki Niwa | 2–3 | — | 3–2 | 3–0 | 5 | Advance to second stage |
| 3 | (South Korea) Jeong Sang-eun | 0–3 | 2–3 | — | 3–2 | 4 | Advance to play-off |
| 4 | (Iran) Noshad Alamian | 1–3 | 0–3 | 2–3 | — | 3 | |

Continental Group

| Pos. | Player | (Iran); Alamian | (Thailand); Tanviriyavechakul | (India); Thakkar | (Saudi Arabia); Al-Abbad | Points | Qualification |
| 1 | (Iran) Nima Alamian | — | 3–0 | 3–2 | 3–0 | 6 | Advance to play-off |
| 2 | (Thailand) P. Tanviriyavechakul | 0–3 | — | 3–1 | 3–1 | 5 | |
| 3 | (India) M. V. Thakkar | 2–3 | 1–3 | — | 3–2 | 4 | |
| 4 | (Saudi Arabia) Abdulaziz Al-Abbad | 0–3 | 1–3 | 2–3 | — | 3 | |

Play-offs

Play-offs
(Chinese Taipei) Chen Chien-an | 1
(South Korea) Jeong Sang-eun | 3
(Chinese Taipei) Chuang Chih-yuan | 1
(Iran) Nima Alamian | 3

=== Main draw ===
The main draw took place on 7 and 8 April.

Quarterfinals
6 | (Japan) Tomokazu Harimoto | 7 | 11 | 9 | 5 | 8
8 | (South Korea) Jeong Sang-eun | 11 | 8 | 11 | 11 | 11
2 | (China) Lin Gaoyuan | 11 | 11 | 11 | 9 | 11
3 | (Hong Kong) Wong Chun Ting | 6 | 9 | 5 | 11 | 6
5 | (Japan) Koki Niwa | 11 | 4 | 3 | 10 | 6
1 | (China) Fan Zhendong | 9 | 11 | 11 | 12 | 11
13 | (Iran) Nima Alamian | 11 | 9 | 4 | 4 | 7
4 | (South Korea) Lee Sang-su | 9 | 11 | 11 | 11 | 11

Semifinals
8 | (South Korea) Jeong Sang-eun | 9 | 8 | 8 | 14
2 | (China) Lin Gaoyuan | 11 | 11 | 11 | 16
1 | (China) Fan Zhendong | 11 | 11 | 9 | 11 | 11
4 | (South Korea) Lee Sang-su | 4 | 5 | 11 | 9 | 4

Final
2 | (China) Lin Gaoyuan | 3 | 13 | 8 | 11
1 | (China) Fan Zhendong | 11 | 15 | 11 | 13
Third place
8 | (South Korea) Jeong Sang-eun | 4 | 9 | 11 | 7 | 9
4 | (South Korea) Lee Sang-su | 11 | 11 | 7 | 11 | 11

5th-8th place play-off

Play-off
6 | (Japan) Tomokazu Harimoto | 11 | 11 | 11 | 11
3 | (Hong Kong) Wong Chun Ting | 8 | 4 | 9 | 6
5 | (Japan) Koki Niwa | 11 | 11 | 14 | 11
13 | (Iran) Nima Alamian | 9 | 8 | 12 | 9

Fifth place
6 | (Japan) Tomokazu Harimoto | 11 | 10 | 11 | 11 | 10 | 6 | 12
5 | (Japan) Koki Niwa | 9 | 12 | 6 | 5 | 12 | 11 | 10
Seventh place
3 | (Hong Kong) Wong Chun Ting | 11 | 11 | 9 | 6 | 11 | 11 | 11
13 | (Iran) Nima Alamian | 7 | 13 | 11 | 11 | 5 | 2 | 8

== Women's singles ==
=== Seeding ===
Players were seeded according to the April 2018 ITTF World Ranking.

1. (China) Chen Meng
2. (China) Zhu Yuling
3. (Japan) Kasumi Ishikawa
4. (Japan) Miu Hirano
5. (Chinese Taipei) Cheng I-ching
6. (South Korea) Seo Hyo-won
7. (Chinese Taipei) Chen Szu-yu
8. (Hong Kong) Lee Ho Ching
9. (Hong Kong) Doo Hoi Kem
10. (South Korea) Yang Ha-eun
11. (Thailand) Suthasini Sawettabut
12. (Thailand) Nanthana Komwong
13. (Vietnam) Mai Hoàng Mỹ Trang
14. (Iran) Neda Shahsavari
15. (India) Ayhika Mukherjee

=== Group stage ===
The group stage took place on 6 April.

Group A

| Pos. | Player | (China); Chen | (Chinese Taipei); Cheng | (Thailand); Sawettabut | (Hong Kong); Lee | Points | Qualification |
| 1 | (China) Chen Meng | — | 3–0 | 3–0 | 3–0 | 6 | Advance to second stage |
| 2 | (Chinese Taipei) Cheng I-ching | 0–3 | — | 3–1 | 3–1 | 5 | Advance to second stage |
| 3 | (Thailand) S. Sawettabut | 0–3 | 1–3 | — | 3–2 | 4 | Advance to play-off |
| 4 | (Hong Kong) Lee Ho Ching | 0–3 | 1–3 | 2–3 | — | 3 | |

Group B

| Pos. | Player | (China); Zhu | (Hong Kong); Doo | (Japan); Hirano | (South Korea); Yang Ha-eun | Points | Qualification |
| 1 | (China) Zhu Yuling | — | 3–2 | 3–0 | 3–0 | 6 | Advance to second stage |
| 2 | (Hong Kong) Doo Hoi Kem | 2–3 | — | 3–2 | 3–1 | 5 | Advance to second stage |
| 3 | (Japan) Miu Hirano | 0–3 | 2–3 | — | 3–1 | 4 | Advance to play-off |
| 4 | (South Korea) Yang Ha-eun | 0–3 | 1–3 | 1–3 | — | 3 | |

Group C

| Pos. | Player | (Japan); Ishikawa | (South Korea); Seo | (Chinese Taipei); Chen | (Thailand); Komwong | Points | Qualification |
| 1 | (Japan) Kasumi Ishikawa | — | 3–1 | 3–0 | 3–0 | 6 | Advance to second stage |
| 2 | (South Korea) Seo Hyo-won | 1–3 | — | 3–2 | 3–0 | 5 | Advance to second stage |
| 3 | (Chinese Taipei) Chen Szu-yu | 0–3 | 2–3 | — | 3–1 | 4 | Advance to play-off |
| 4 | (Thailand) Nanthana Komwong | 0–3 | 0–3 | 1–3 | — | 3 | |

Continental Group

| Pos. | Player | (India); Mukherjee | (Vietnam); Mai | (Iran); Shahsavari | Points | Qualification |
| 1 | (India) Ayhika Mukherjee | — | 3–0 | 3–0 | 4 | Advance to play-off |
| 2 | (Vietnam) Mai Hoàng Mỹ Trang | 0–3 | — | 3–2 | 3 | |
| 3 | (Iran) Neda Shahsavari | 0–3 | 2–3 | — | 2 | |

Play-offs

Play-offs
(Thailand) Suthasini Sawettabut | 0
(Japan) Miu Hirano | 3
(India) Ayhika Mukherjee | 1
(Chinese Taipei) Chen Szu-yu | 3

=== Main draw ===
The main draw took place on 7 and 8 April.

Quarterfinals
1 | (China) Chen Meng | 11 | 10 | 11 | 11 | 9 | 11
7 | (Chinese Taipei) Chen Szu-yu | 8 | 12 | 2 | 6 | 11 | 3
9 | (Hong Kong) Doo Hoi Kem | 6 | 11 | 7 | 4
3 | (Japan) Kasumi Ishikawa | 11 | 13 | 11 | 11
6 | (South Korea) Seo Hyo-won | 6 | 10 | 2 | 11 | 15 | 6
5 | (Chinese Taipei) Cheng I-ching | 11 | 12 | 11 | 4 | 13 | 11
4 | (Japan) Miu Hirano | 4 | 13 | 5 | 12 | 9 | 5
2 | (China) Zhu Yuling | 11 | 11 | 11 | 10 | 11 | 11

Semifinals
1 | (China) Chen Meng | 11 | 11 | 10 | 11 | 11
3 | (Japan) Kasumi Ishikawa | 7 | 9 | 12 | 5 | 9
5 | (Chinese Taipei) Cheng I-ching | 8 | 6 | 7 | 11 | 6
2 | (China) Zhu Yuling | 11 | 11 | 11 | 5 | 11

Final
1 | (China) Chen Meng | 10 | 10 | 12 | 3 | 4
2 | (China) Zhu Yuling | 12 | 12 | 10 | 11 | 11
Third place
3 | (Japan) Kasumi Ishikawa | 11 | 7 | 11 | 9 | 11 | 7 | 11
5 | (Chinese Taipei) Cheng I-ching | 9 | 11 | 4 | 11 | 8 | 11 | 7

5th-8th place play-off

Play-off
7 | (Chinese Taipei) Chen Szu-yu | 11 | 8 | 4 | 6 | 5
9 | (Hong Kong) Doo Hoi Kem | 6 | 11 | 11 | 11 | 11
6 | (South Korea) Seo Hyo-won | 10 | 6 | 13 | 11 | 12 | 3
4 | (Japan) Miu Hirano | 12 | 11 | 15 | 3 | 10 | 11

Fifth place
9 | (Hong Kong) Doo Hoi Kem | 11 | 4 | 6 | 11 | 10 | 9
4 | (Japan) Miu Hirano | 9 | 11 | 11 | 8 | 12 | 11
Seventh place
7 | (Chinese Taipei) Chen Szu-yu | 11 | 11 | 7 | 4 | 12 | 12
6 | (South Korea) Seo Hyo-won | 5 | 6 | 11 | 11 | 10 | 10

== See also ==
- 2018 Europe Top 16 Cup
- 2018 ITTF-Oceania Cup
- 2018 ITTF Pan-America Cup
