= 2018 ITTF Team World Cup =

- Venue: Copper Box Arena
- Location: London, England, United Kingdom
- Date: 22–25 February
- Teams: 24
- Total prize money: $270,000

Champions
- Men: China
- Women: China

The 2018 ITTF Team World Cup was a table tennis competition held at the Copper Box Arena in London from 22 to 25 February 2018. It was the 11th edition of the ITTF-sanctioned event, and the first time that it had been held in the United Kingdom.

China won both events, defeating Japan in both the men's and women's team finals.

== Medallists ==
Event	Gold	Silver	Bronze
Men's team	China; Fan Zhendong; Lin Gaoyuan; Ma Long; Xu Xin; Yu Ziyang	Japan; Tomokazu Harimoto; Koki Niwa; Yuya Oshima; Jin Ueda	England; Paul Drinkhall; Tom Jarvis; David McBeath; Liam Pitchford; Sam Walker
Men's team	China; Fan Zhendong; Lin Gaoyuan; Ma Long; Xu Xin; Yu Ziyang	Japan; Tomokazu Harimoto; Koki Niwa; Yuya Oshima; Jin Ueda	South Korea; Jeong Sang-eun; Jung Young-sik; Lee Sang-su; Lim Jong-hoon
Women's team	China; Chen Xingtong; Ding Ning; Liu Shiwen; Wang Manyu; Zhu Yuling	Japan; Hina Hayata; Miu Hirano; Kasumi Ishikawa; Mima Ito	Hong Kong; Doo Hoi Kem; Lee Ho Ching; Mak Tze Wing; Ng Wing Nam; Soo Wai Yam Minnie
Women's team	China; Chen Xingtong; Ding Ning; Liu Shiwen; Wang Manyu; Zhu Yuling	Japan; Hina Hayata; Miu Hirano; Kasumi Ishikawa; Mima Ito	North Korea; Cha Hyo Sim; Choe Hyon Hwa; Kim Nam Hae; Kim Song-i

== Qualification ==
The host nation England, and each of the current continental team champions qualified for both the men's and women's events, with additional places awarded to the highest-placed teams at the 2016 World Team Championships that hadn't already qualified through continental events.

Men

Event	Berths	Qualified
Host	1	England
2017 Asian Championships	1	China
2017 European Championships	1	Germany
2017 Pan American Championships	2	Brazil; United States
2016 Africa Championships	1	Egypt
2016 Oceania Championships	1	Australia
2016 World Team Championships	5	Japan; South Korea; France; Hong Kong; Sweden
TOTAL	12	

Women

Event	Berths	Qualified
Host	1	England
2017 Asian Championships	1	China
2017 European Championships	1	Romania
2017 Pan American Championships	2	Brazil; United States
2016 Africa Championships	1	Egypt
2016 Oceania Championships	1	Australia
2016 World Team Championships	5	Japan; Chinese Taipei; North Korea; Singapore; Hong Kong
TOTAL	12	

Notes

1. ^{a} Two qualifying places awarded, to ensure that both North and South America are represented.
2. ^{b} Five qualifying places awarded to the highest-placed teams that did not already qualify through continental events.

== See also ==
- 2018 World Team Table Tennis Championships
- 2018 ITTF World Tour
- 2018 ITTF Men's World Cup
- 2018 ITTF Women's World Cup
