= David Powell (table tennis) =

Australian table tennis player

David Powell (born 8 April 1991 in Melbourne, Victoria, Australia) is an Australian table tennis player. He competed at the 2016 Summer Olympics in the men's singles event, in which he was eliminated in the preliminary round by Marcelo Aguirre, and as part of the Australian team in the men's team event.

Powell qualified to represent Australia at the 2020 Summer Olympics. In the singles lost 4–0 to Wang Yang of Slovakia in the first round and did not advance any further. In the team event he competed with Hu Heming, Chris Yan and they advanced to the round of 16 where they were beaten by Japan 3–0. Australia at the 2020 Summer Olympics details the results in depth.
