= Chris Yan =

Australian table tennis player

Chris Yan (born 9 December 1988 in Xi’an, China) is an Australian table tennis player. He competed at the 2016 Summer Olympics in the men's singles event, in which he was eliminated in the preliminary round by Aleksandar Karakašević, and as part of the Australian team in the men's team event.

Yan qualified to represent Australia at the 2020 Summer Olympics. He was beaten by Ovidiu Ionescu of Romania in the first round 4-1 and therefore did not advance any further in the singles. He competed in the team event and the team of Hu Heming, David Powell and Yan advanced to the round of 16 where they were beaten by Japan 3-0. Australia at the 2020 Summer Olympics details the results in depth.
