= Kim Song-i =

North Korean table tennis player (born 1994)

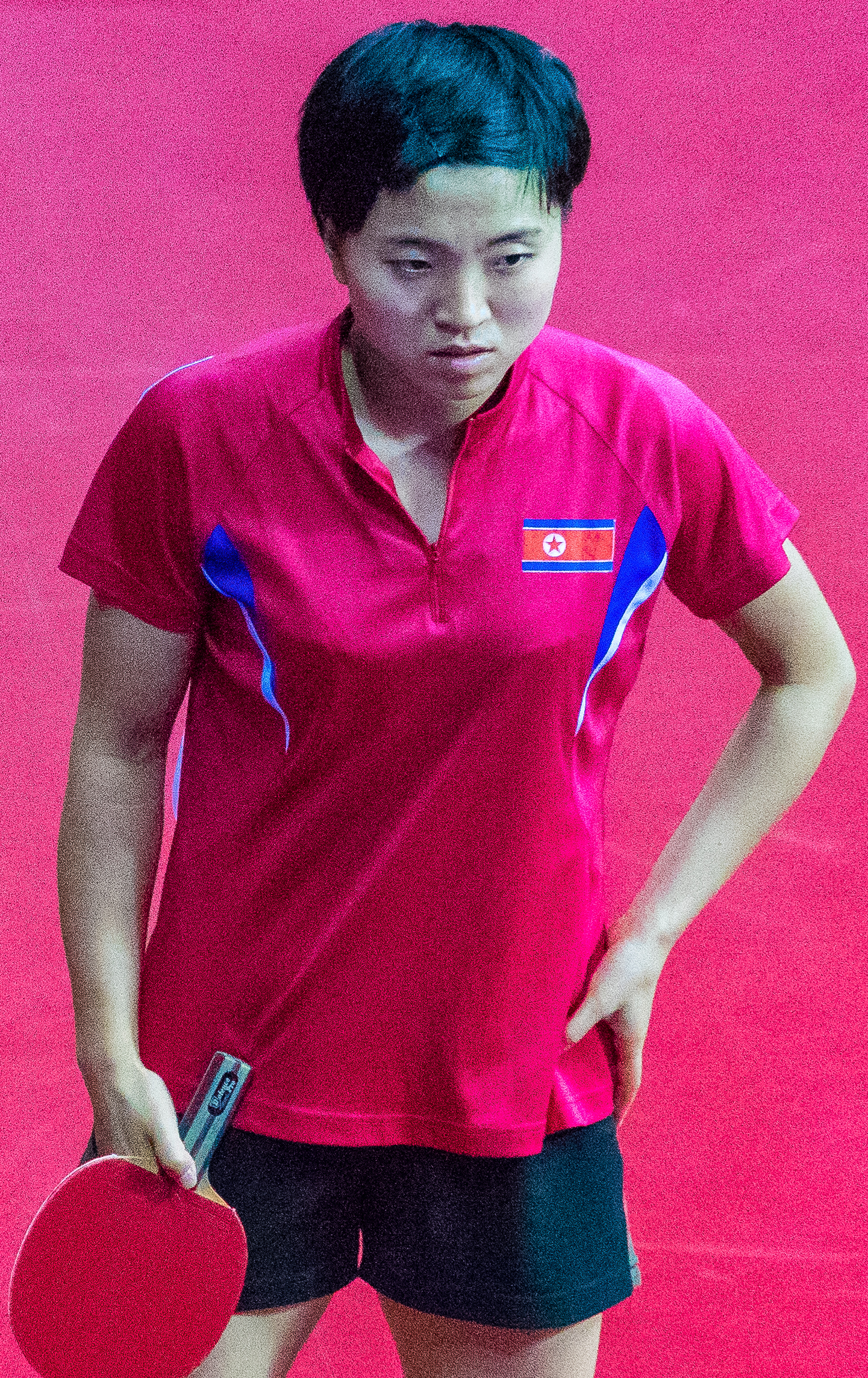
- Kim at the 2017 Summer Universiade

Personal information
- Nationality: North Korea
- Born: 10 August 1994 (age 32) Phyongchon District, Pyongyang
- Height: 1.61 m (5 ft 3 in)
- Weight: 55 kg (121 lb)

Sport
- Sport: Table tennis
- Club: Amrokkang Sports Club
- Playing style: Right-handed, Classic
Medal record
Representing North Korea
Olympic Games
Bronze medal – third place	2016 Rio de Janeiro	Singles
World Championships
Bronze medal – third place	2016 Kuala Lumpur	Team
Representing Korea
World Championships
Bronze medal – third place	2018 Halmstad	Team

- Kim Song-i
- Hangul: 김송이
- Hanja: 金松怡
- RR: Gim Songi
- MR: Kim Songi

Kim Song-i (Korean pronunciation: [kim.soŋ.i]; born 10 August 1994) is a North Korean table tennis player. As of November 2017, she is ranked 23rd in the world based on ITTF rankings.

Kim plays a highly defensive style with plenty of slice, occasionally injecting pace with top spin strokes from the forehand. She represents the Amrokkang Sports Club.

She won the bronze medal for North Korea at the 2016 Summer Olympics.

== Early life ==
Kim was born on 10 August 1994 to a working-class family in Phyongchon District, Pyongyang. She went to the Ponghak Primary School and later the Sosong District Juvenile Sports School.

== Career ==
In 2012, at Helsingborg, she won the Women's Singles title at the Swedish Open.

=== 2016 Rio Olympics ===
In the third round, she surprisingly beat Japan's Kasumi Ishikawa, ranked number six in the world. In the quarter-finals, she went on to beat Singaporean Yu Mengyu, ranked 13th, with a score of 4-2 before losing to second-ranked Ding Ning in the semifinals with a score of 4–1. However, Kim was not an easy opponent for Ding, who was both stressed and exhausted after the match. In the bronze medal match, she beat Japan's Ai Fukuhara with a score of 4–1 to take the bronze medal of the 2016 Olympics.
