= Jian Fang Lay =

Australian table tennis player

Personal information
- Full name: Jian Fang Lay-Hong
- Nationality: Australia
- Born: 6 March 1973 (age 53) Wenzhou, Zhejiang, China
- Height: 1.63 m (5 ft 4 in)
- Weight: 58 kg (128 lb)

Sport
- Sport: Table tennis
Medal record
Women's table tennis
Representing Australia
Commonwealth Games
Silver medal – second place	2002 Manchester	Mixed doubles
Silver medal – second place	2002 Manchester	Team
Silver medal – second place	2006 Melbourne	Team
Silver medal – second place	2014 Glasgow	Mixed doubles
Silver medal – second place	2022 Birmingham	Doubles
Bronze medal – third place	2002 Manchester	Doubles
Bronze medal – third place	2006 Melbourne	Doubles
Bronze medal – third place	2014 Glasgow	Team
Bronze medal – third place	2022 Birmingham	Team
Oceania Championships
Gold medal – first place	2000 Koumac	Team
Gold medal – first place	2002 Suva	Singles
Gold medal – first place	2002 Suva	Doubles
Gold medal – first place	2002 Suva	Team
Gold medal – first place	2004 Whangarei	Team
Gold medal – first place	2010 Auckland	Doubles
Gold medal – first place	2010 Auckland	Team
Silver medal – second place	2000 Koumac	Singles
Silver medal – second place	2000 Koumac	Doubles
Silver medal – second place	2002 Suva	Mixed Doubles
Silver medal – second place	2004 Whangarei	Singles
Silver medal – second place	2004 Whangarei	Doubles
Silver medal – second place	2004 Whangarei	Mixed doubles
Bronze medal – third place	2000 Koumac	Mixed doubles
Bronze medal – third place	2010 Auckland	Singles
Bronze medal – third place	2010 Auckland	Mixed doubles

Jian Fang Lay-Hong (Chinese: 洪剑芳; pinyin: Hóng Jiànfāng; born 6 March 1973), is a right-handed Chinese-born Australian ladies table tennis player. She plays penhold, with a long pimple rubber at one side for use of attacking, blocking as well as chopping. She is currently number 1 female player in Australia, as well as number 141 in the world.

At the 2020 Tokyo Olympics Lay-Hong became the first Australian woman to compete at 6 Olympic games. She won her first 3 matches but then lost in Round 3 to Han Ying of Germany 4-0 so did not advance to the round of 16. She also competed with Michelle Bromley and Melissa Tapper in the women's team event but were defeated by Germany 3-0 in the round of 16. Australia at the 2020 Summer Olympics details the results in depth.

Born in Wenzhou, China, Lay moved to Melbourne in the early 1990s and eventually became a three-time Victorian champion as well as winning several titles in other Victorian tournaments. She was selected in the Australian national team in 1994 and participated in the Sydney, Athens, Beijing, London, Rio de Janeiro and Tokyo Olympic Games. Lay also competed at the 2002, 2006 and 2014 Commonwealth Games, where she took home a total of four silver and three bronze medals.

In June 2008, she returned to the position of number one female tennis table player in Victoria and Australia after staying at the number 3 spot since 2007. She was first qualified for the Beijing Olympics after beating Stephanie Sang at the Oceania Qualifiers at Nouméa, New Caledonia.

== See also ==
- List of table tennis players
