= Hu Heming =

Australian table tennis player

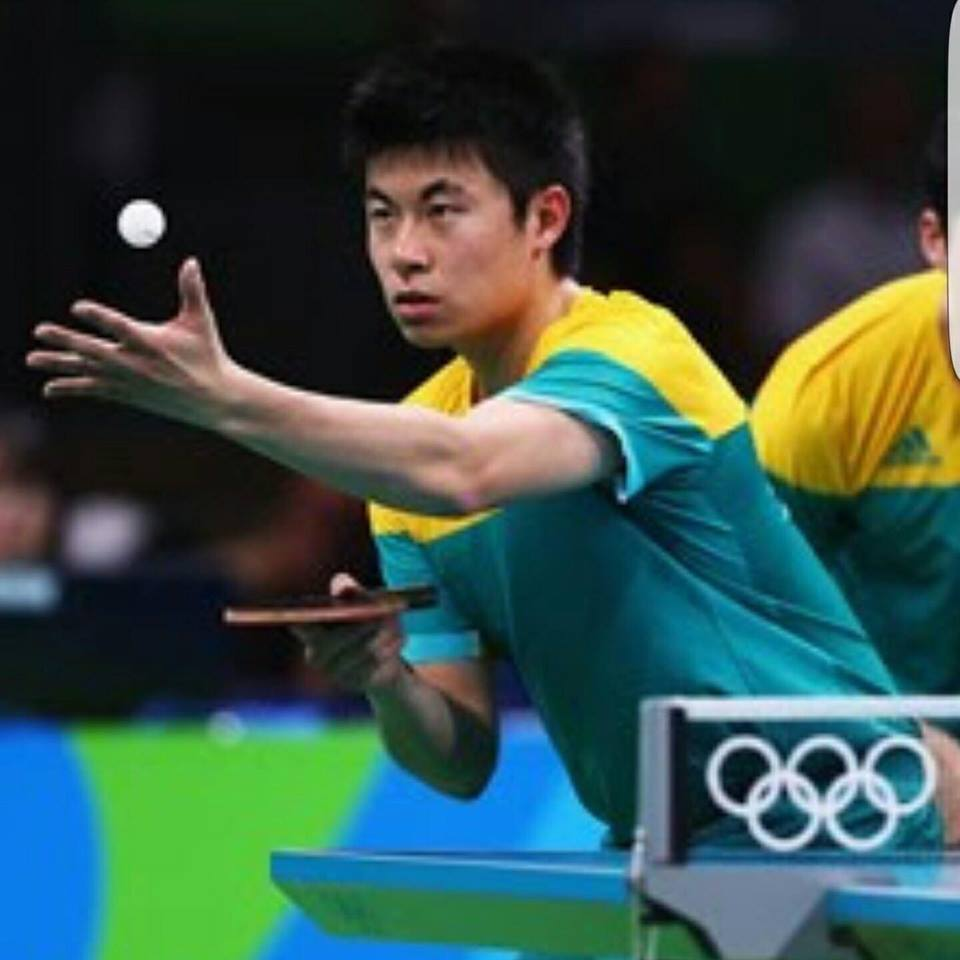

Personal information
- Nationality: Australian
- Born: March 21, 1994 (age 32)

Sport
- Sport: Table tennis

Hu Heming (born 21 March 1994) is an Australian table tennis player who has competed at the 2016 Summer Olympics and 2020 Summer Olympics.

== Early life ==
Hu started playing table tennis in his garage when he was six years old. He moved to China at age 16 to pursue his table tennis career. Hu attended Lyndale Secondary College in Dandenong North, Victoria.

== Career ==
At the 2020 Summer Olympics, the team of Chris Yan, David Powell and Heming advanced to the round of 16 where they were beaten by Japan 3–0.

His highest Men's World Ranking was 61 in September 2019, and number 1 in the Australia and Oceania Region for 4 years (2017-2021), before he announced his retirement on March 21, 2022.

Heming represented Australia at the 2014 & 2018 Commonwealth Games. He is the 2018 & and 2019 Oceania Cup Champion and qualified to represent Australia at the 2018 and 2019 Men's World Cups.
