= 2025 European Table Tennis Championships – Men's team =

Men's singles at the 2025 European Table Tennis Championships
- Venue: Dvorana Krešimira Ćosića
- Location: Zadar, Croatia
- Dates: 12–19 October

The men's team event at the 2025 European Table Tennis Championships will take place in Zadar, Croatia from 12 to 19 October 2025.

== Playing system ==
=== Format ===
All matches in the team events will be played as a best-of-five series of individual matches, with the following order of play:

Match 1	Match 2	Match 3	Match 4	Match 5
A1 vs B2	A2 vs B1	A3 vs B3	A1 vs B1	A2 vs B2

=== Group stage ===
The 24 qualified teams will compete for the title of European Team Champion.

The group stage will consist of 8 groups (A–H) with 3 teams in each group. The seeding list is based on the European Team Ranking. The top 8 seeds are placed directly as position 1 in groups A to H. Teams seeded 9–12 are drawn into position 2 of Group E to H, whereas seeded 13-16 are drawn in position 2 of Group A to D. Teams seeded 17–24 are drawn freely into position 3.

Each group will be played in a round-robin format. A team who first takes three individual matches gets two points, and the other team lost will get one point. Group winners and runner ups will advance to the knockout stage.

=== Knockout stage ===
The knockout stage begins with the round of 16. Group winners and runners-up in the same group will be drawn into opposite half.

== Seeding ==
The seeding list was determined by the ETTU Ranking Committee.

Seed	Team	Player 1	Player 2	Player 3	Player 4	Player 5
1	Sweden	~~Truls Möregårdh~~	Anton Källberg	Kristian Karlsson	Mattias Falck	Elias Ranefur
2	France	Félix Lebrun	Alexis Lebrun	Simon Gauzy	Thibault Poret	Flavien Coton
3	Germany	Benedikt Duda	Patrick Franziska	Dang Qiu	André Bertelsmeier	Ricardo Walther
4	Portugal	Marcos Freitas	Joao Geraldo	Tiago Apolonia	João Monteiro	
5	Denmark	Anders Lind	Jonathan Groth	Martin Andersen	Thor Christensen	
6	Romania	Eduard Ionescu	Iulian Chirita	Ovidiu Ionescu	Darius Movileanu	Andrei Istrate
7	Croatia	Andrej Gaćina	Tomislav Pucar	Filip Zeljko	Ivor Ban	Frane Tomislav Kojić
8	Belgium	Martin Allegro	Adrien Rassenfosse	Cédric Nuytinck	Florent Lambiet	
9	Slovakia	Yang Wang	Lubomir Pistej	Alexander Valuch	Jakub Zelinka	
10	Poland	Miłosz Redzimski	Samuel Kulczycki	Maciej Kubik	Marek Badowski	Rafał Formela
11	Slovenia	Darko Jorgić	Deni Kozul	Brin Vovk Petrovski	Peter Hribar	Bojan Tokić
12	Austria	Daniel Habesohn	Robert Gardos	Andreas Levenko	Maciej Kolodziejczyk	
13	Hungary	Ádám Szudi	Balázs Lei	Csaba András	Dávid Szántosi	
14	England	Liam Pitchford	Tom Jarvis	Samuel Walker	Connor Green	Paul Drinkhall
15	Czech Republic	Lubomír Jančařík	Pavel Širuček	Radim Morávek	Ondřej Květoň	
16	Serbia	Dimitrije Levajac	Zsolt Peto	Nemanja Đilas	Uroš Ninković	
17	Ukraine	Andrii Grebeniuk	Nazar Tretiak	Anton Limonov	Anton Molochko	
18	Greece	Panagiotis Gionis	Ioannis Sgouropoulos	Georgios Stamatouros	Konstantinos Konstantinopoulos	
19	Spain	Álvaro Robles	Juan Pérez	Daniel Berzosa	Miguel Pantoja	Miguel Vílchez
20	Italy	Matteo Mutti	Danilo Faso	Federico Vallino	Tommaso Giovannetti	John Oyebode
21	Finland	Benedek Oláh	Alex Naumi	Aleksi Räsänen	Lassi Lehtola	
22	Netherlands	Gabrielius Camara	Kas van Oost	Milo de Boer	Barry Berben	
23	Turkey	Abdullah Yiğenler	İbrahim Gündüz	Tugay Yılmaz	Uğurcan Dursun	
24	Moldova	Vladislav Ursu	Andrei Putuntica	Denis Terna		

== Draw ==
=== Group stage ===
==== Group A ====
Pos	Team	Pld	W	L	Pts
1	Sweden (1)	2	2	0	4
2	Turkey (23)	2	1	1	3
3	Czech Republic (15)	2	0	2	2

==== Group B ====
Pos	Team	Pld	W	L	Pts
1	France (2)	2	2	0	4
2	Spain (19)	2	1	1	3
3	Hungary (13)	2	0	2	2

==== Group C ====
Pos	Team	Pld	W	L	Pts
1	Germany (3)	2	2	0	4
2	Serbia (16)	2	1	1	3
3	Ukraine (17)	2	0	2	2

==== Group D ====
Pos	Team	Pld	W	L	Pts
1	Portugal (4) (Note: Portugal is the highest ranked team in Group D by having the largest match winning losing ratio. Portugal has won five individual matches and lost four individual matches (5:4). Second ranked team Greece won four, lost four(4:4). Third ranked team England won four, lost five (4:5).)	2	1	1	3
2	Greece (18)	2	1	1	3
3	England (14)	2	1	1	3

==== Group E ====
Pos	Team	Pld	W	L	Pts
1	Slovenia (11)	2	2	0	4
2	Denmark (5)	2	1	1	3
3	Italy (20)	2	0	2	2

==== Group F ====
Pos	Team	Pld	W	L	Pts
1	Romania (6)	2	2	0	4
2	Slovakia (9)	2	1	1	3
3	Netherlands (22)	2	0	2	2

==== Group G ====
Pos	Team	Pld	W	L	Pts
1	Croatia (7)	2	2	0	4
2	Moldova (24)	2	1	1	3
3	Austria (12)	2	0	2	2

==== Group H ====
Pos	Team	Pld	W	L	Pts
1	Belgium (8)	2	2	0	4
2	Poland (10)	2	1	1	3
3	Finland (21)	2	0	2	2

==== Knockout stage ====
R16
1	Sweden	3
10	Poland	1
16	Serbia	0
6	Romania	3
11	Slovenia	3
24	Moldova	1
19	Spain	2
4	Portugal	3
3	Germany	3
5	Denmark	0
18	Greece	2
7	Croatia	3
8	Belgium	3
23	Turkey	0
9	Slovakia	0
2	France	3

Quarterfinals
1	Sweden	2
6	Romania	3
11	Slovenia	3
4	Portugal	1
3	Germany	3
7	Croatia	1
8	Belgium	0
2	France	3

Semifinals
6	Romania	3
11	Slovenia	0
3	Germany	1
2	France	3

Final
6	Romania	0
2	France	3

== Qualification ==
Top 16 finishers will be directly qualified in 2026 World Team Table Tennis Championships. The remaining teams participating in this tournament may qualify based on ITTF Team Ranking published on November, 2025.

=== Final Ranking ===
Position	Team	Qualification
1	France	Qualified for 2026 WTTTC
2	Romania	Qualified for 2026 WTTTC
3-4	Germany	Qualified for 2026 WTTTC
3-4	Slovenia	Qualified for 2026 WTTTC
5-8	Sweden	Qualified for 2026 WTTTC
5-8	Portugal	Qualified for 2026 WTTTC
5-8	Croatia	Qualified for 2026 WTTTC
5-8	Belgium	Qualified for 2026 WTTTC
9-16	Poland	Qualified for 2026 WTTTC
9-16	Serbia	Qualified for 2026 WTTTC
9-16	Moldova	Qualified for 2026 WTTTC
9-16	Spain	Qualified for 2026 WTTTC
9-16	Denmark	Qualified for 2026 WTTTC
9-16	Greece	Qualified for 2026 WTTTC
9-16	Turkey	Qualified for 2026 WTTTC
9-16	Slovakia	Qualified for 2026 WTTTC
17-24	England (H)	Guaranteed a quota as Host Nation
17-24	Hungary	Qualify through ITTF Teams Ranking
17-24	Austria	Qualify through ITTF Teams Ranking
17-24	Czech Republic	Qualify through ITTF Teams Ranking
17-24	Italy	Not possible to qualify unless qualified teams not confirm to participate
17-24	Netherlands	Not possible to qualify unless qualified teams not confirm to participate
17-24	Ukraine	Not possible to qualify unless qualified teams not confirm to participate
17-24	Finland	Not possible to qualify unless qualified teams not confirm to participate
