= WTT Star Contender Astana 2026 =

Table tennis tournament in Kazakhstan

WTT Star Contender Astana 2026 – President’s Cup presented by Nomad Table Tennis Academy
Tournament details
- Dates: 15–20 September
- Edition: 1st
- Total prize money: US$300,000
- Venue: Martial Arts Palace
- Location: Astana, Kazakhstan

Champions
- Men's singles: (Germany) Dang Qiu
- Women's singles: (Japan) Miyuu Kihara
- Men's doubles: (Romania) Eduard Ionescu (Romania) Darius Movileanu
- Women's doubles: (Japan) Miu Hirano (Japan) Miyuu Kihara
- Mixed doubles: (China) Chen Junsong (China) Wang Yidi

The WTT Star Contender Astana 2026 – President’s Cup presented by Nomad Table Tennis Academy was a table tennis tournament that took place at the Martial Arts Palace, Astana, Kazakhstan, from 15 to 20 September and had a total prize of US$300,000.

== Tournament ==
The WTT Star Contender Astana 2026 was the twentieth tournament of the 2026 WTT Series and also part of the WTT Star Contender event.

=== Venue ===
This tournament was held at the Martial Arts Palace in Astana, Kazakhstan.

=== Point distribution ===
Below was the point distribution table for each phase of the tournament based on the WTT World Ranking for the WTT Star Contender event.

Event	Winner	Finalist	Semi-finalist	Quarter-finalist	Round of 16	Round of 32	Round of 48
Singles	600	420	270	175	115	30	5
Doubles	600	420	270	70	5	—	—

=== Prize pool ===
The total prize money was US$300,000 with the distribution of the prize money in accordance with WTT regulations.

Event	Winner	Finalist	Semi-finalist	Quarter-finalist	Round of 16	Round of 32	Round of 48
Singles	$17,000	$9,025	$4,250	$2,250	$1,500	$1,100	$900
Doubles	$5,500	$3,567	$2,125	$1,200	$650	—	—

== Men's singles ==
=== Seeds ===
1. (France) Alexis Lebrun (final)
2. (Germany) Dang Qiu (champion)
3. (Slovenia) Darko Jorgić (third round)
4. (China) Zhou Qihao (semi-finals)
5. (France) Thibault Poret (second round)
6. (Germany) Dimitrij Ovtcharov (quarter-finals)
7. (Germany) Patrick Franziska (second round)
8. (France) Flavien Coton (quarter-finals)
9. (United States) Kanak Jha (quarter-finals)
10. (China) Chen Yuanyu (second round)
11. (Egypt) Omar Assar (third round)
12. (Croatia) Tomislav Pucar (third round)
13. (Germany) Benedikt Duda (third round)
14. (China) Chen Junsong (second round)
15. (England) Tom Jarvis (second round)
16. (Czech Republic) Lubomír Jančařík (second round)

=== Finals ===
Semi-finals
1	(France) Alexis Lebrun	6	11	11	11
4	(China) Zhou Qihao	11	7	5	8
Q	(China) Li Tianyang	11	9	9	7
2	(Germany) Dang Qiu	9	11	11	11

Final
1	(France) Alexis Lebrun	11	5	11	6	6	4
2	(Germany) Dang Qiu	6	11	5	11	11	11

=== Top half ===
==== Section 1 ====
First round
(China) Xue F	6	12	11	11	4
WC	(Austria) A Levenko	11	14	4	2	11
Q	(Germany) K Stumper	7	8	11	11	11
(Japan) Y Tanaka	11	11	8	9	7
(South Korea) Park G-h	11	11	9	8
Q	(Germany) F Meng	13	6	11	11
(Japan) Y Sakai	6	6	11	11	6
(Japan) R Yoshiyama	11	11	4	9	11

Second round
1	(France) A Lebrun	11	11	12
WC	(Austria) A Levenko	5	7	10
Q	(Germany) K Stumper	9	11	11	9	11
15	(England) T Jarvis	11	8	7	11	6
12	(Croatia) T Pucar	11	11	11
Q	(Germany) F Meng	9	8	8
(Japan) R Yoshiyama	12	5	11	11
5	(France) T Poret	10	11	4	8

Third round
1	(France) A Lebrun	7	11	11	11
Q	(Germany) K Stumper	11	3	2	9
12	(Croatia) T Pucar	7	11	6	11	11
(Japan) R Yoshiyama	11	7	11	7	13

Quarter-finals
1	(France) A Lebrun	11	11	12
(Japan) R Yoshiyama	5	3	10

==== Section 2 ====
First round
(Russia) N Artemenko	11	5	11	11
(Romania) O Ionescu	4	11	7	7
(France) L de Nodrest	7	8	11	4
(Russia) E Tikhonov	11	11	9	11
Q	(Japan) R Kawakami	11	5	6	11	11
(Germany) A Bertelsmeier	9	11	11	6	9
(Belgium) C Nuytinck	8	11	11	12
(Japan) K Hamada	11	7	6	10

Second round
4	(China) Zhou QH	11	11	9	11
(Russia) N Artemenko	3	9	11	7
(Russia) E Tikhonov	12	9	7	11	6
13	(Germany) B Duda	10	11	11	7	11
10	(China) Chen YY	11	9	5	11	2
Q	(Japan) R Kawakami	6	11	11	8	11
(Belgium) C Nuytinck	5	11	5	10
6	(Germany) D Ovtcharov	11	8	11	12

Third round
4	(China) Zhou QH	10	11	11	11
13	(Germany) B Duda	12	6	6	4
Q	(Japan) R Kawakami	11	8	5	7
6	(Germany) D Ovtcharov	9	11	11	11

Quarter-finals
4	(China) Zhou QH	11	9	6	13	11
6	(Germany) D Ovtcharov	9	11	11	11	8

=== Bottom half ===
==== Section 3 ====
First round
Q	(Turkey) I Gündüz	7	11	10	4
(Romania) I Chirita	11	9	12	11
(Germany) R Walther	11	8	5	4
(Belgium) A Rassenfosse	2	11	11	11
(France) L Bardet	11	5	7	10
Q	(China) Li TY	7	11	11	12
Q	(China) Xu YB	8	11	4	11	11
(Romania) E Ionescu	11	7	11	6	8

Second round
8	(France) F Coton	11	11	8	11
(Romania) I Chirita	9	9	11	9
(Belgium) A Rassenfosse	4	8	11	11	10
11	(Egypt) O Assar	11	11	8	9	12
14	(China) Chen JS	6	11	3	6
Q	(China) Li TY	11	9	11	11
Q	(China) Xu YB	7	6	11
3	(Slovenia) D Jorgić	11	11	13

Third round
8	(France) F Coton	11	11	11
11	(Egypt) O Assar	9	5	9
Q	(China) Li TY	19	11	11
3	(Slovenia) D Jorgić	17	8	5

Quarter-finals
8	(France) F Coton	9	10	7
Q	(China) Li TY	11	12	11

==== Section 4 ====
First round
Q	(Romania) D Movileanu	11	5	12	11
WC	(Kazakhstan) Fang B	9	11	10	6
Q	(Russia) D Vinogradov	11	8	11	11
WC	(Belgium) M Allegro	6	11	4	9
Q	(Japan) M Oikawa	11	8	11	9	11
WC	(Slovenia) D Kožul	4	11	9	11	6
Q	(South Korea) Ma Y-m	11	6	10	7
(Spain) Á Robles	4	11	12	11

Second round
7	(Germany) P Franziska	4	11	13	10	5
Q	(Romania) D Movileanu	11	2	11	12	11
Q	(Russia) D Vinogradov	11	9	11	1	9
9	(United States) K Jha	7	11	5	11	11
16	(Czech Republic) L Jančařík	7	5	10
Q	(Japan) M Oikawa	11	11	12
(Spain) Á Robles	6	5	10
2	(Germany) D Qiu	11	11	12

Third round
Q	(Romania) D Movileanu	11	16	7
9	(United States) K Jha	13	18	11
Q	(Japan) M Oikawa	12	4	4	4
2	(Germany) D Qiu	10	11	11	11

Quarter-finals
9	(United States) K Jha	12	11	9	3	3
2	(Germany) D Qiu	10	7	11	11	11

== Women's singles ==
=== Seeds ===
1. (China) Wang Yidi (semi-finals)
2. (Japan) Satsuki Odo (semi-finals)
3. (Japan) Hitomi Sato (final)
4. (Japan) Honoka Hashimoto (quarter-finals)
5. (China) Shi Xunyao (second round)
6. (Puerto Rico) Adriana Díaz (second round)
7. (Romania) Bernadette Szőcs (third round)
8. (China) Qin Yuxuan (quarter-finals)
9. (Japan) Miyuu Kihara (champion)
10. (Japan) Miu Hirano (quarter-finals)
11. (Germany) Nina Mittelham (second round)
12. (Wales) Anna Hursey (third round)
13. (Russia) Elizabet Abraamian (second round)
14. (Romania) Elizabeta Samara (second round)
15. (France) Jia Nan Yuan (third round)
16. (Chinese Taipei) Huang Yu-jie (second round)

=== Finals ===
Semi-finals
1	(China) Wang Yidi	11	11	13	8	6
3	(Japan) Hitomi Sato	7	9	15	11	11
9	(Japan) Miyuu Kihara	7	11	7	11	11
2	(Japan) Satsuki Odo	11	6	11	7	5

Final
3	(Japan) Hitomi Sato	11	10	11	11	10	11	8
9	(Japan) Miyuu Kihara	3	12	3	13	12	3	11

=== Top half ===
==== Section 1 ====
First round
(China) Zhu ZY	11	15	11
Q	(Russia) E Zironova	7	13	7
(Romania) E Zaharia	6	11	10	14	12
(Spain) S-X Zhang	11	8	12	12	10
Q	(Spain) A Cristóbal	1	3	7
(Chinese Taipei) Li Y-j	11	11	11
(China) Zong GM	8	12	10	15	11
(South Korea) Yang H-e	11	10	12	13	7

Second round
1	(China) Wang YD	11	11	11
(China) Zhu ZY	7	2	7
(Romania) E Zaharia	11	11	12
14	(Romania) E Samara	6	7	10
11	(Germany) N Mittelham	4	9	11	9
(Chinese Taipei) Li Y-j	11	11	9	11
(China) Zong GM	6	4	4
7	(Romania) B Szőcs	11	11	11

Third round
1	(China) Wang YD	11	11	11
(Romania) E Zaharia	5	4	7
(Chinese Taipei) Li Y-j	11	11	11
7	(Romania) B Szőcs	7	8	9

Quarter-finals
1	(China) Wang YD	11	11	11
(Chinese Taipei) Li Y-j	7	6	7

==== Section 2 ====
First round
(Spain) M Xiao	11	11	11
(India) A Kutumbale	8	4	4
Q	(Russia) M Tailakova	11	11	7	11
(South Korea) Yoo Y-r	7	5	11	6
(India) S Wani	9	7	9
(Russia) A Slautina	11	11	11
(Italy) D Vivarelli	9	6	10
(Russia) V Voronina	11	11	12

Second round
3	(Japan) H Sato	11	11	11
(Spain) M Xiao	4	8	7
Q	(Russia) M Tailakova	6	8	6
15	(France) J N Yuan	11	11	11
12	(Wales) A Hursey	11	12	11
(Russia) A Slautina	3	10	4
(Russia) V Voronina	10	11	9	8
8	(China) Qin YX	12	6	11	11

Third round
3	(Japan) H Sato	11	11	11
15	(France) J N Yuan	8	4	6
12	(Wales) A Hursey	8	6	7
8	(China) Qin YX	11	11	11

Quarter-finals
3	(Japan) H Sato	11	11	11	11
8	(China) Qin YX	3	13	8	7

=== Bottom half ===
==== Section 3 ====
First round
(South Korea) Yoo S-w	5	8	7
(Turkey) E Haraç	11	11	11
(Sweden) F Bergand	8	11	9	11	13
(Russia) M Panfilova	11	7	11	6	11
WC	(China) Wang XT	11	11	11
(Romania) A Dragoman	8	4	7
Q	(Spain) E Rad	6	11	6	5
(France) C Lutz	11	9	11	11

Second round
5	(China) Shi XY	11	8	9	8
(Turkey) E Haraç	9	11	11	11
(Sweden) F Bergand	8	7	9
9	(Japan) M Kihara	11	11	11
16	(Chinese Taipei) Huang Y-j	11	7	10	9
WC	(China) Wang XT	8	11	12	11
(France) C Lutz	7	6	9
4	(Japan) H Hashimoto	11	11	11

Third round
(Turkey) E Haraç	0	9	8
9	(Japan) M Kihara	11	11	11
WC	(China) Wang XT	6	6	6
4	(Japan) H Hashimoto	11	11	11

Quarter-finals
9	(Japan) M Kihara	6	7	11	11	11
4	(Japan) H Hashimoto	11	11	9	4	4

==== Section 4 ====
First round
Q	(China) Zhu SB	11	11	9	11
(Italy) G Monfardini	7	6	11	9
(South Korea) Kim S-j	11	9	11	2
Q	(China) Han FE	13	11	7	11
(India) M Batra	11	11	9	11
Q	(Mexico) A Cossio	4	6	11	4
Q	(China) Yao RX	11	1	11	11
(China) Yang YY	6	11	7	8

Second round
6	(Puerto Rico) A Díaz	11	9	11	8	10
Q	(China) Zhu SB	6	11	7	11	12
Q	(China) Han FE	8	7	7
10	(Japan) M Hirano	11	11	11
13	(Russia) E Abraamian	5	7	10
(India) M Batra	11	11	12
Q	(China) Yao RX	9	11	11	12	4
2	(Japan) S Odo	11	9	8	14	11

Third round
Q	(China) Zhu SB	11	8	9	14
10	(Japan) M Hirano	8	11	11	16
(India) M Batra	4	7	11	12
2	(Japan) S Odo	11	11	9	14

Quarter-finals
10	(Japan) M Hirano	6	9	9
2	(Japan) S Odo	11	11	11

== Men's doubles ==
=== Seeds ===
1. (Germany) Dang Qiu / (Germany) Benedikt Duda (quarter-finals)
2. (Belgium) Martin Allegro / (Belgium) Adrien Rassenfosse (quarter-finals)
3. (France) Flavien Coton / (France) Thibault Poret (first round)
4. (Japan) Hiromu Kobayashi / (Japan) Kazuki Hamada (quarter-finals)

=== Finals ===
Semi-finals
(China) Zhou Qihao (China) Xue Fei	7	8	11	10
(Romania) Eduard Ionescu (Romania) Darius Movileanu	11	11	6	12
(Russia) Nikita Artemenko (Russia) Denis Ivonin	11	9	11	4	11
(Russia) Evgeny Tikhonov (Russia) Dmitrii Vinogradov	9	11	9	11	6

Final
(Romania) Eduard Ionescu (Romania) Darius Movileanu	13	12	5	11
(Russia) Nikita Artemenko (Russia) Denis Ivonin	11	10	11	7

=== Top half ===
First round
1	(Germany) D Qiu (Germany) B Duda	6	11	19	6	11
WC	(Kazakhstan) Fang B (South Korea) Park G-h	11	4	17	11	7
WC	(Germany) P Franziska (Germany) D Ovtcharov	5	4	11	6
(China) Zhou QH (China) Xue F	11	11	9	11
3	(France) F Coton (France) T Poret	8	7	3
(Romania) E Ionescu (Romania) D Movileanu	11	11	11
Q	(China) Li HC (China) Zhou GH	14	2	12	5	11
(China) Chen JS (China) Chen YY	12	11	10	11	6

Quarter-finals
1	(Germany) D Qiu (Germany) B Duda	3	10	9
(China) Zhou QH (China) Xue F	11	12	11
(Romania) E Ionescu (Romania) D Movileanu	10	6	14	11	11
Q	(China) Li HC (China) Zhou GH	12	11	12	0	7

Semi-finals
(China) Zhou QH (China) Xue F	7	8	11	10
(Romania) E Ionescu (Romania) D Movileanu	11	11	6	12

=== Bottom half ===
First round
(Russia) N Artemenko (Russia) D Ivonin	13	11	11
Q	(China) Yu HY (China) Tang YR	11	9	6
Q	(South Korea) Kim G-o (South Korea) Ma Y-m	7	4	7
4	(Japan) H Kobayashi (Japan) K Hamada	11	11	11
(Turkey) I Gündüz (Turkey) A Yigenler	8	13	6	6
(Russia) E Tikhonov (Russia) D Vinogradov	11	11	11	11
Q	(Kazakhstan) I Artukmetov (Kazakhstan) S Kurmambayev	6	8	9
2	(Belgium) M Allegro (Belgium) A Rassenfosse	11	11	11

Quarter-finals
(Russia) N Artemenko (Russia) D Ivonin	8	11	11	11
4	(Japan) H Kobayashi (Japan) K Hamada	11	8	5	6
(Russia) E Tikhonov (Russia) D Vinogradov	11	11	11
2	(Belgium) M Allegro (Belgium) A Rassenfosse	7	2	7

Semi-finals
(Russia) N Artemenko (Russia) D Ivonin	11	9	11	4	11
(Russia) E Tikhonov (Russia) D Vinogradov	9	11	9	11	6

== Women's doubles ==
=== Seeds ===
1. (China) Qin Yuxuan / (China) Zong Geman (quarter-finals)
2. (China) Wang Xiaotong / (China) Shi Xunyao (first round)
3. (Romania) Bernadette Szőcs / (Romania) Elizabeta Samara (first round)
4. (China) Wang Yidi / (China) Han Feier (semi-finals)

=== Finals ===
Semi-finals
(Japan) Honoka Hashimoto (Puerto Rico) Adriana Díaz	11	11	11
Q	(Russia) Mariia Tailakova (Russia) Ekaterina Zironova	6	7	5
4	(China) Wang Yidi (China) Han Feier	8	8	11	4
(Japan) Miu Hirano (Japan) Miyuu Kihara	11	11	7	11

Final
(Japan) Honoka Hashimoto (Puerto Rico) Adriana Díaz	11	10	9	5
(Japan) Miu Hirano (Japan) Miyuu Kihara	8	12	11	11

=== Top half ===
First round
1	(China) Qin YX (China) Zong GM	13	9	11	11
(South Korea) Yoo Y-r (South Korea) Kim S-j	11	11	4	6
(Japan) H Hashimoto (Puerto Rico) A Díaz	11	11	11
Q	(Kazakhstan) A Ashkeyeva (Kazakhstan) G Torshayeva	4	6	4
3	(Romania) B Szőcs (Romania) E Samara	11	11	2	9
Q	(Russia) M Tailakova (Russia) E Zironova	3	13	11	11
WC	(China) Zhu ZY (China) Yang YY	6	11	11	11
(Russia) M Panfilova (Russia) A Slautina	11	8	3	9

Quarter-finals
1	(China) Qin YX (China) Zong GM	8	8	16	11	3
(Japan) H Hashimoto (Puerto Rico) A Díaz	11	11	14	7	11
Q	(Russia) M Tailakova (Russia) E Zironova	7	11	5	12	11
WC	(China) Zhu ZY (China) Yang YY	11	9	11	10	5

Semi-finals
(Japan) H Hashimoto (Puerto Rico) A Díaz	11	11	11
Q	(Russia) M Tailakova (Russia) E Zironova	6	7	5

=== Bottom half ===
First round
Q	(Spain) E Rad (Spain) A Cristóbal	6	4	14
(Russia) E Abraamian (Russia) V Voronina	11	11	16
(Romania) A Dragoman (Romania) E Zaharia	6	11	7	2
4	(China) Wang YD (China) Han FE	11	8	11	11
(Italy) G Monfardini (Sweden) F Bergand	11	11	11
Q	(Kazakhstan) O Kamilzhanova (Kazakhstan) A Adilgereyeva	2	3	2
(Japan) M Hirano (Japan) M Kihara	11	11	13
2	(China) Wang XT (China) Shi XY	4	9	11

Quarter-finals
(Russia) E Abraamian (Russia) V Voronina	5	11	8	9
4	(China) Wang YD (China) Han FE	11	8	11	11
(Italy) G Monfardini (Sweden) F Bergand	3	3	10
(Japan) M Hirano (Japan) M Kihara	11	11	12

Semi-finals
4	(China) Wang YD (China) Han FE	8	8	11	4
(Japan) M Hirano (Japan) M Kihara	11	11	7	11

== Mixed doubles ==
=== Seeds ===
1. (Spain) Álvaro Robles / (Spain) María Xiao (quarter-finals)
2. (Romania) Eduard Ionescu / (Romania) Bernadette Szőcs (first round)
3. (Russia) Evgeny Tikhonov / (Russia) Maria Panfilova (quarter-finals)
4. (France) Alexis Lebrun / (France) Charlotte Lutz (first round)

=== Finals ===
Semi-finals
(Japan) Hiromu Kobayashi (Japan) Miyuu Kihara	11	12	11
(South Korea) Park Gang-hyeon (South Korea) Yoo Si-woo	3	10	6
(China) Chen Junsong (China) Wang Yidi	11	11	11
WC	(Kazakhstan) Fang Bo (France) Jia Nan Yuan	4	8	9

Final
(Japan) Hiromu Kobayashi (Japan) Miyuu Kihara	9	8	10
(China) Chen Junsong (China) Wang Yidi	11	11	12

=== Top half ===
First round
1	(Spain) Á Robles (Spain) M Xiao	12	11	11
WC	(Germany) B Duda (Germany) N Mittelham	10	9	6
(Japan) H Kobayashi (Japan) M Kihara	11	11	11
Q	(Russia) M Grebnev (Russia) V Voronina	3	9	8
3	(Russia) E Tikhonov (Russia) M Panfilova	11	12	12	8	11
Q	(China) Li TY (China) Zhu SB	9	10	14	11	9
(South Korea) Park G-h (South Korea) Yoo S-w	6	7	11	11	11
(Germany) P Franziska (Puerto Rico) A Díaz	11	11	8	9	8

Quarter-finals
1	(Spain) Á Robles (Spain) M Xiao	8	13	9	11	5
(Japan) H Kobayashi (Japan) M Kihara	11	11	11	9	11
3	(Russia) E Tikhonov (Russia) M Panfilova	11	3	8	8
(South Korea) Park G-h (South Korea) Yoo S-w	9	11	11	11

Semi-finals
(Japan) H Kobayashi (Japan) M Kihara	11	12	11
(South Korea) Park G-h (South Korea) Yoo S-w	3	10	6

=== Bottom half ===
First round
Q	(Romania) D Movileanu (Romania) A Dragoman	3	11	5	5
(China) Chen JS (China) Wang YD	11	5	11	11
(Russia) N Artemenko (Russia) E Abraamian	8	11	11	11
4	(France) A Lebrun (France) C Lutz	11	9	8	5
Q	(China) Li HC (China) Yao RX	11	11	12
(Turkey) A Yigenler (Turkey) E Haraç	5	8	10
WC	(Kazakhstan) Fang B (France) J N Yuan	11	11	10	11
2	(Romania) E Ionescu (Romania) B Szőcs	8	7	12	5

Quarter-finals
(China) Chen JS (China) Wang YD	11	11	14	12	11
(Russia) N Artemenko (Russia) E Abraamian	5	3	16	14	3
Q	(China) Li HC (China) Yao RX	12	9	11	12	11
WC	(Kazakhstan) Fang B (France) J N Yuan	10	11	3	14	13

Semi-finals
(China) Chen JS (China) Wang YD	11	11	11
WC	(Kazakhstan) Fang B (France) J N Yuan	4	8	9

Preceded by WTT Champions Macao 2026; WTT Contender Panagyurishte 2026	2026 WTT Series	Succeeded by China Smash 2026
