= China Smash 2026 =

Table tennis tournament in China

China Smash 2026 presented by Beijing Shijingshan Culture & Tourism Group

Tournament details
- Dates: 1–11 October
- Edition: 3rd
- Total prize money: US$2,050,000
- Venue: Shougang Park
- Location: Beijing, China

Champions
- Men's singles: (Japan) Sora Matsushima
- Women's singles: (China) Wang Manyu
- Men's doubles: (South Korea) Lim Jong-hoon (South Korea) Oh Jun-sung
- Women's doubles: (China) Wang Manyu (China) Kuai Man
- Mixed doubles: (South Korea) Lim Jong-hoon (South Korea) Shin Yu-bin

The China Smash 2026 presented by Beijing Shijingshan Culture & Tourism Group was a table tennis tournament that took place at the Shougang Park in Beijing, China, from 1 to 11 October and had a total prize of US$2,050,000.

== Tournament ==
The China Smash 2026 was the twenty-first tournament of the 2026 WTT Series and also part of the Grand Smash event. This tournament marks the fourth and final Grand Smash event on this season’s calendar, concluding a season that featured four Grand Smash tournaments.

=== Venue ===
This tournament was held at the Shougang Park in Beijing, China.

=== Point distribution ===
Below was the point distribution table for each phase of the tournament based on the WTT World Ranking for the Grand Smash event.

| Event | Winner | Finalist | Semi-finalist | Quarter-finalist | Round of 16 | Round of 24 / 32 | Round of 64 |
| Singles | 2000 | 1400 | 900 | 580 | 380 | 100 | 20 |
| Doubles | 2000 | 1400 | 900 | 580 | 150 | 10 | — |

=== Prize pool ===
The total prize money was US$2,050,000 with the distribution of the prize money in accordance with WTT regulations.

| Event | Winner | Finalist | Semi-finalist | Quarter-finalist | Round of 16 | Round of 24 / 32 | Round of 64 |
| Singles | $135,000 | $68,000 | $34,000 | $20,250 | $14,000 | $9,000 | $5,000 |
| Doubles | $12,000 | $6,834 | $5,000 | $3,750 | $2,500 | $1,500 | — |

== Schedule ==
The tournament lasts over 11 days.

| #Q | Qualification rounds | #R | Preliminary rounds | QF | Quarter-finals | SF | Semi-finals | F | Finals |

| Date | 01 Oct | 02 Oct | | 03 Oct | 04 Oct | 05 Oct | 06 Oct | 07 Oct | 08 Oct | 09 Oct | 10 Oct | 11 Oct | |
| Event | 01 Oct | 02 Oct | | 03 Oct | 04 Oct | 05 Oct | 06 Oct | 07 Oct | 08 Oct | 09 Oct | 10 Oct | 11 Oct | |
|---|---|---|---|---|---|---|---|---|---|---|---|---|---|
| Men's singles | 1Q | | 2Q | 3Q | 1R | | 2R | | 3R | QF | | SF | F |
| Women's singles | 1Q | | 2Q | 3Q | 1R | | 2R | | 3R | QF | SF | F | |
| Men's doubles | | | | | | 1R | | 2R | QF | SF | F | | |
| Women's doubles | | | | | | 1R | | 2R | QF | SF | F | | |
| Mixed doubles | | | | | 1R | | 2R | QF | SF | F | | | |

== Qualification ==
=== Men's singles ===
The following players qualified for the main draw:

- (Slovakia) Ľubomír Pištej
- (Germany) André Bertelsmeier
- (Belgium) Cédric Nuytinck
- (China) Yuan Licen
- (Germany) Wim Verdonschot
- (Slovakia) Yang Wang
- (China) Xu Yingbin
- (Romania) Darius Movileanu

The following players qualified as lucky losers after replacing players who withdrew from the main draw:

- (Romania) Iulian Chirita
- (Hong Kong) Baldwin Chan

=== Women's singles ===
The following players qualified for the main draw:

- (China) Fan Shuhan
- (China) Zhu Sibing
- (Thailand) Orawan Paranang
- (China) Wang Xiaotong
- (China) Liu Ziling
- (Hong Kong) Su Tsz Tung
- (China) Zong Geman
- (Germany) Xiaona Shan

== Men's singles ==
=== Seeds ===
1. (France) Félix Lebrun (quarter-finals)
2. (Japan) Sora Matsushima (champion)
3. (Japan) Tomokazu Harimoto (third round)
4. (Sweden) Truls Möregårdh (quarter-finals)
5. (Chinese Taipei) Lin Yun-ju (final)
6. (Brazil) Hugo Calderano (semi-finals)
7. (France) Alexis Lebrun (first round)
8. (Germany) Dang Qiu (first round)
9. (South Korea) Jang Woo-jin (quarter-finals)
10. (Slovenia) Darko Jorgić (first round)
11. (Japan) Shunsuke Togami (first round)
12. (Denmark) Anders Lind (first round)
13. (China) Wen Ruibo (third round)
14. (China) Zhou Qihao (semi-finals)
15. (Russia) Vladimir Sidorenko (first round)
16. (Japan) Hiroto Shinozuka (first round)

=== Finals ===
Quarter-finals
1 | (France) Félix Lebrun | 11 | 9 | 10 | 10 | 9
6 | (Brazil) Hugo Calderano | 9 | 11 | 12 | 12 | 11
4 | (Sweden) Truls Möregårdh | 7 | 9 | 9 | 7
5 | (Chinese Taipei) Lin Yun-ju | 11 | 11 | 11 | 11
9 | (South Korea) Jang Woo-jin | 10 | 11 | 11 | 9 | 12 | 6
14 | (China) Zhou Qihao | 12 | 8 | 4 | 11 | 14 | 11
(Chinese Taipei) Feng Yi-hsin | 2 | 7 | 12 | 6 | 9
2 | (Japan) Sora Matsushima | 11 | 11 | 10 | 11 | 11

Semi-finals
6 | (Brazil) Hugo Calderano | 11 | 11 | 8 | 8 | 4 | 11 | 5
5 | (Chinese Taipei) Lin Yun-ju | 9 | 9 | 11 | 11 | 11 | 3 | 11
14 | (China) Zhou Qihao | 6 | 9 | 12 | 11 | 7 | 5
2 | (Japan) Sora Matsushima | 11 | 11 | 10 | 7 | 11 | 11

Final
5 | (Chinese Taipei) Lin Yun-ju | 7 | 9 | 11 | 11 | 11 | 7 | 9
2 | (Japan) Sora Matsushima | 11 | 11 | 7 | 8 | 5 | 11 | 11

=== Top half ===
==== Section 1 ====
First round
1 | (France) F Lebrun | 6 | 11 | 11 | 11
(Japan) M Yoshimura | 11 | 9 | 5 | 9
(China) Chen YY | 11 | 5 | 13 | 9 | 6
(France) F Coton | 8 | 11 | 11 | 11 | 11
(Croatia) T Pucar | 9 | 4 | 14 | 12 | 11
(India) M Shah | 11 | 11 | 12 | 10 | 8
Q | (Romania) D Movileanu | 11 | 11 | 11
16 | (Japan) H Shinozuka | 4 | 8 | 4
12 | (Denmark) A Lind | 3 | 11 | 12 | 3
(Germany) P Franziska | 11 | 7 | 14 | 11
(Portugal) J Geraldo | 11 | 11 | 10 | 8
Q | (China) Yuan LC | 7 | 13 | 12 | 11
WC | (Kazakhstan) K Gerassimenko | 7 | 6 | 12 | 11 | 12
(South Korea) An J-h | 11 | 11 | 10 | 7 | 14
(Germany) D Ovtcharov | 9 | 9 | 8
6 | (Brazil) H Calderano | 11 | 11 | 11

Second round
1 | (France) F Lebrun | 9 | 14 | 11 | 11
(France) F Coton | 11 | 12 | 9 | 4
(Croatia) T Pucar | 4 | 11 | 12 | 11
Q | (Romania) D Movileanu | 11 | 5 | 10 | 8
(Germany) P Franziska | 4 | 11 | 11 | 11
Q | (China) Yuan LC | 11 | 7 | 4 | 5
(South Korea) An J-h | 5 | 9 | 10
6 | (Brazil) H Calderano | 11 | 11 | 12

Third round
1 | (France) F Lebrun | 11 | 12 | 11
(Croatia) T Pucar | 9 | 10 | 5
(Germany) P Franziska | 2 | 5 | 7
6 | (Brazil) H Calderano | 11 | 11 | 11

Quarter-finals
1 | (France) F Lebrun | 11 | 9 | 10 | 10 | 9
6 | (Brazil) H Calderano | 9 | 11 | 12 | 12 | 11

==== Section 2 ====
First round
4 | (Sweden) T Möregårdh | 9 | 11 | 11 | 10 | 20
LL | (Hong Kong) B Chan | 11 | 5 | 9 | 12 | 18
WC | (China) Chen JS | 11 | 9 | 6 | 6
Q | (China) Xu YB | 7 | 11 | 11 | 11
(Germany) B Duda | 12 | 11 | 9 | 11 | 11
(England) T Jarvis | 14 | 3 | 11 | 9 | 6
LL | (Romania) I Chirita | 4 | 6 | 11 | 8
13 | (China) Wen RB | 11 | 11 | 5 | 11
11 | (Japan) S Togami | 11 | 3 | 11 | 5 | 17
(South Korea) Oh J-s | 8 | 11 | 5 | 11 | 19
WC | (China) Xue F | 4 | 11 | 10 | 8
(Sweden) K Karlsson | 11 | 8 | 12 | 11
WC | (China) Huang YZ | 11 | 6 | 7 | 11 | 16
(South Korea) Lim J-h | 5 | 11 | 11 | 5 | 14
(Hong Kong) Wong C T | 11 | 5 | 11 | 7 | 6
5 | (Chinese Taipei) Lin Y-j | 8 | 11 | 9 | 11 | 11

Second round
4 | (Sweden) T Möregårdh | 11 | 11 | 6 | 12
Q | (China) Xu YB | 5 | 7 | 11 | 10
(Germany) B Duda | 6 | 8 | 7
13 | (China) Wen RB | 11 | 11 | 11
(South Korea) Oh J-s | 10 | 13 | 6 | 11 | 11
(Sweden) K Karlsson | 12 | 11 | 11 | 9 | 8
WC | (China) Huang YZ | 11 | 6 | 6 | 11 | 13
5 | (Chinese Taipei) Lin Y-j | 6 | 11 | 11 | 8 | 15

Third round
4 | (Sweden) T Möregårdh | 7 | 11 | 11 | 5 | 11
13 | (China) Wen RB | 11 | 6 | 9 | 11 | 5
(South Korea) Oh J-s | 9 | 8 | 14 | 11 | 11
5 | (Chinese Taipei) Lin Y-j | 11 | 11 | 12 | 7 | 13

Quarter-finals
4 | (Sweden) T Möregårdh | 7 | 9 | 9 | 7
5 | (Chinese Taipei) Lin Y-j | 11 | 11 | 11 | 11

=== Bottom half ===
==== Section 3 ====
First round
7 | (France) A Lebrun | 11 | 11 | 9 | 11
(Poland) M Redzimski | 7 | 8 | 11 | 2
(India) M Thakkar | 9 | 9 | 11 | 11 | 12
(France) S Gauzy | 11 | 11 | 7 | 5 | 10
Q | (Belgium) C Nuytinck | 8 | 6 | 7
(Sweden) A Källberg | 11 | 11 | 11
(Egypt) O Assar | 11 | 12 | 10 | 10 | 2
9 | (South Korea) Jang W-j | 7 | 10 | 12 | 12 | 11
14 | (China) Zhou QH | 8 | 12 | 11 | 7 | 11
WC | (Singapore) I Quek | 11 | 10 | 3 | 11 | 3
(China) Xiang P | 4 | 11 | 11 | 14
(France) T Poret | 11 | 8 | 6 | 12
WC | (South Korea) Park G-h | 14 | 3 | 11 | 12
Q | (Germany) A Bertelsmeier | 12 | 11 | 8 | 10
(Denmark) J Groth | 11 | 11 | 2 | 9 | 9
3 | (Japan) T Harimoto | 9 | 7 | 11 | 11 | 11

Second round
7 | (France) A Lebrun | 9 | 14 | 11 | 11
(India) M Thakkar | 11 | 12 | 9 | 4
(Sweden) A Källberg | 8 | 9 | 4
9 | (South Korea) Jang W-j | 11 | 11 | 11
14 | (China) Zhou QH | 7 | 9 | 11 | 11 | 13
(China) Xiang P | 11 | 11 | 4 | 5 | 11
WC | (South Korea) Park G-h | 6 | 8 | 11 | 11 | 10
3 | (Japan) T Harimoto | 11 | 11 | 7 | 5 | 12

Third round
7 | (France) A Lebrun | 8 | 7 | 8
9 | (South Korea) Jang W-j | 11 | 11 | 11
14 | (China) Zhou QH | 11 | 11 | 11
3 | (Japan) T Harimoto | 9 | 8 | 9

Quarter-finals
9 | (South Korea) Jang W-j | 10 | 11 | 11 | 9 | 12 | 6
14 | (China) Zhou QH | 12 | 8 | 4 | 11 | 14 | 11

==== Section 4 ====
First round
8 | (Germany) D Qiu | 6 | 9 | 8
(Chinese Taipei) Feng Y-h | 11 | 11 | 11
(Czech Republic) L Jančařík | 3 | 11 | 5 | 6
(Belgium) A Rassenfosse | 11 | 8 | 11 | 11
Q | (Slovakia) Y Wang | 17 | 11 | 11
(Australia) N Lum | 15 | 8 | 4
Q | (Germany) W Verdonschot | 11 | 9 | 11 | 11
10 | (Slovenia) D Jorgić | 9 | 11 | 6 | 9
15 | (Russia) V Sidorenko | 8 | 8 | 7
(China) Liang JK | 11 | 11 | 11
(Sweden) E Ranefur | 4 | 4 | 6
(Chinese Taipei) Kuo G-h | 11 | 11 | 11
WC | (Australia) F Luu | 8 | 15 | 8 | 11 | 11
Q | (Slovakia) Ľ Pištej | 11 | 13 | 11 | 9 | 8
(United States) K Jha | 11 | 5 | 11
2 | (Japan) S Matsushima | 13 | 11 | 13

Second round
(Chinese Taipei) Feng Y-h | 11 | 11 | 11
(Belgium) A Rassenfosse | 8 | 9 | 3
Q | (Slovakia) Y Wang | 9 | 11 | 5 | 11 | 11
Q | (Germany) W Verdonschot | 11 | 9 | 11 | 3 | 13
(China) Liang JK | 7 | 2 | 11 | 10
(Chinese Taipei) Kuo G-h | 11 | 11 | 6 | 12
WC | (Australia) F Luu | 10 | 1 | 8
2 | (Japan) S Matsushima | 11 | 11 | 11

Third round
(Chinese Taipei) Feng Y-h | 12 | 11 | 11 | 11 | 11
Q | (Germany) W Verdonschot | 14 | 9 | 9 | 13 | 9
(Chinese Taipei) Kuo G-h | 6 | 11 | 6 | 4
2 | (Japan) S Matsushima | 11 | 5 | 11 | 11

Quarter-finals
(Chinese Taipei) Feng Y-h | 2 | 7 | 12 | 6 | 9
2 | (Japan) S Matsushima | 11 | 11 | 10 | 11 | 11

== Women's singles ==
=== Seeds ===
1. (China) Wang Manyu (champion)
2. (China) Sun Yingsha (second round)
3. (Japan) Miwa Harimoto (semi-finals)
4. (China) Kuai Man (third round)
5. (China) Wang Yidi (quarter-finals)
6. (Japan) Hina Hayata (third round)
7. (China) Chen Xingtong (semi-finals)
8. (Germany) Sabine Winter (third round)
9. (China) Chen Yi (third round)
10. (South Korea) Shin Yu-bin (quarter-finals)
11. (Japan) Satsuki Odo (third round)
12. (Japan) Hitomi Sato (final)
13. (South Korea) Joo Cheon-hui (first round)
14. (Japan) Honoka Hashimoto (quarter-finals)
15. (Germany) Ying Han (first round)
16. (China) Shi Xunyao (third round)

=== Finals ===
Quarter-finals
1 | (China) Wang Manyu | 11 | 11 | 11 | 11
10 | (South Korea) Shin Yu-bin | 8 | 7 | 3 | 9
3 | (Japan) Miwa Harimoto | 9 | 9 | 11 | 11 | 11 | 11
5 | (China) Wang Yidi | 11 | 11 | 6 | 5 | 9 | 9
12 | (Japan) Hitomi Sato | 11 | 6 | 11 | 11 | 11
Q | (China) Zhu Sibing | 9 | 11 | 8 | 6 | 8
7 | (China) Chen Xingtong | 5 | 8 | 11 | 12 | 11 | 11
14 | (Japan) Honoka Hashimoto | 11 | 11 | 2 | 10 | 3 | 6

Semi-finals
1 | (China) Wang Manyu | 11 | 11 | 7 | 11 | 11
3 | (Japan) Miwa Harimoto | 8 | 7 | 11 | 5 | 8
12 | (Japan) Hitomi Sato | 2 | 11 | 11 | 11 | 11
7 | (China) Chen Xingtong | 11 | 8 | 7 | 9 | 8

Final
1 | (China) Wang Manyu | 11 | 11 | 11 | 11
12 | (Japan) Hitomi Sato | 2 | 8 | 3 | 9

=== Top half ===
==== Section 1 ====
First round
1 | (China) Wang MY | 11 | 11 | 11
(United States) A Wang | 3 | 4 | 8
(Brazil) B Takahashi | 11 | 8 | 9 | 11 | 10
WC | (India) M Batra | 8 | 11 | 11 | 5 | 12
(Poland) N Bajor | 11 | 8 | 7 | 11 | 11
(Australia) Y Liu | 7 | 11 | 11 | 9 | 8
WC | (South Korea) Yang H-e | 4 | 5 | 3
16 | (China) Shi XY | 11 | 11 | 11
10 | (South Korea) Shin Y-b | 9 | 11 | 11 | 11
(Germany) A Kaufmann | 11 | 7 | 9 | 6
(South Korea) Lee E-h | 11 | 7 | 11 | 13 | 11
(China) Qin YX | 7 | 11 | 5 | 11 | 8
Q | (China) Fan SH | 11 | 11 | 11
(India) S Akula | 5 | 4 | 8
(Japan) M Nagasaki | 5 | 5 | 11 | 2
6 | (Japan) H Hayata | 11 | 11 | 4 | 11

Second round
1 | (China) Wang MY | 11 | 9 | 11 | 11
WC | (India) M Batra | 5 | 11 | 6 | 5
(Poland) N Bajor | 11 | 7 | 9
16 | (China) Shi XY | 11 | 11 | 11
10 | (South Korea) Shin Y-b | 11 | 11 | 11
(South Korea) Lee E-h | 5 | 7 | 9
Q | (China) Fan SH | 13 | 10 | 8 | 11 | 6
6 | (Japan) H Hayata | 11 | 12 | 11 | 5 | 11

Third round
1 | (China) Wang MY | 8 | 11 | 11 | 14 | 11
16 | (China) Shi XY | 11 | 7 | 8 | 16 | 7
10 | (South Korea) Shin Y-b | 10 | 13 | 12 | 6 | 11
6 | (Japan) H Hayata | 12 | 11 | 10 | 11 | 9

Quarter-finals
1 | (China) Wang MY | 11 | 11 | 11 | 11
10 | (South Korea) Shin Y-b | 8 | 7 | 3 | 9

==== Section 2 ====
First round
3 | (Japan) M Harimoto | 11 | 11 | 11
(France) P Pavade | 9 | 6 | 9
Q | (Hong Kong) Su T T | 11 | 13 | 7 | 10 | 11
(Chinese Taipei) Li Y-j | 8 | 11 | 11 | 12 | 7
Q | (China) Wang XT | 11 | 6 | 11 | 11
(Germany) N Mittelham | 7 | 11 | 6 | 5
WC | (China) He ZJ | 16 | 11 | 11
15 | (Germany) Y Han | 14 | 6 | 4
9 | (China) Chen Y | 11 | 10 | 11 | 11
(Chinese Taipei) Peng Y-h | 5 | 12 | 3 | 4
(Romania) E Samara | 11 | 8 | 5 | 9
(France) J N Yuan | 7 | 11 | 11 | 11
(Chinese Taipei) Huang Y-j | 12 | 7 | 11 | 5 | 7
(Chinese Taipei) Cheng I-c | 10 | 11 | 7 | 11 | 11
(Austria) S Polcanova | 6 | 12 | 3 | 15 | 5
5 | (China) Wang YD | 11 | 10 | 11 | 13 | 11

Second round
3 | (Japan) M Harimoto | 11 | 13 | 11 | 11
Q | (Hong Kong) Su T T | 5 | 15 | 6 | 5
Q | (China) Wang XT | 9 | 11 | 13 | 1 | 9
WC | (China) He ZJ | 11 | 9 | 11 | 11 | 11
9 | (China) Chen Y | 11 | 11 | 11
(France) J N Yuan | 8 | 7 | 3
(Chinese Taipei) Cheng I-c | 13 | 9 | 11 | 7
5 | (China) Wang YD | 15 | 11 | 2 | 11

Third round
3 | (Japan) M Harimoto | 14 | 11 | 11
WC | (China) He ZJ | 12 | 9 | 3
9 | (China) Chen Y | 10 | 13 | 8 | 4
5 | (China) Wang YD | 12 | 11 | 11 | 11

Quarter-finals
3 | (Japan) M Harimoto | 9 | 9 | 11 | 11 | 11 | 11
5 | (China) Wang YD | 11 | 11 | 6 | 5 | 9 | 9

=== Bottom half ===
==== Section 3 ====
First round
8 | (Germany) S Winter | 11 | 11 | 11
WC | (China) Jiang YY | 8 | 3 | 6
(Romania) B Szőcs | 11 | 11 | 11
(Egypt) D Meshref | 8 | 5 | 1
(Ukraine) M Pesotska | 6 | 9 | 4
Q | (China) Liu ZL | 11 | 11 | 11
(Canada) M Zhang | 11 | 8 | 10 | 10
12 | (Japan) H Sato | 8 | 11 | 12 | 12
13 | (South Korea) Joo C-h | 11 | 7 | 5 | 6
Q | (China) Zhu SB | 8 | 11 | 11 | 11
(Chinese Taipei) Chien T-c | 6 | 11 | 11 | 17
(Wales) A Hursey | 11 | 8 | 7 | 15
(Egypt) H Goda | 6 | 9 | 11 | 11 | 9
Q | (China) Zong GM | 11 | 11 | 9 | 8 | 11
(Hong Kong) Doo H K | 6 | 9 | 6
4 | (China) Kuai M | 11 | 11 | 11

Second round
8 | (Germany) S Winter | 9 | 11 | 11 | 11
(Romania) B Szőcs | 11 | 5 | 6 | 9
Q | (China) Liu ZL | 7 | 2 | 7
12 | (Japan) H Sato | 11 | 11 | 11
Q | (China) Zhu SB | 7 | 11 | 11 | 7 | 11
(Chinese Taipei) Chien T-c | 11 | 5 | 5 | 11 | 8
Q | (China) Zong GM | 6 | 11 | 4 | 4
4 | (China) Kuai M | 11 | 7 | 11 | 11

Third round
8 | (Germany) S Winter | 11 | 6 | 4
12 | (Japan) H Sato | 13 | 11 | 11
Q | (China) Zhu SB | 5 | 12 | 9 | 11 | 11
4 | (China) Kuai M | 11 | 10 | 11 | 9 | 7

Quarter-finals
12 | (Japan) H Sato | 11 | 6 | 11 | 11 | 11
Q | (China) Zhu SB | 9 | 11 | 8 | 6 | 8

==== Section 4 ====
First round
7 | (China) Chen XT | 11 | 11 | 11
WC | (China) Xu Y | 4 | 5 | 8
WC | (Singapore) Ser L Q | 16 | 12 | 11
Q | (Germany) X Shan | 14 | 10 | 7
(South Korea) Kim N-y | 11 | 8 | 11 | 11 | 11
(Romania) A Dragoman | 9 | 11 | 13 | 9 | 9
(Puerto Rico) A Díaz | 1 | 3 | 11 | 10
11 | (Japan) S Odo | 11 | 11 | 8 | 12
14 | (Japan) H Hashimoto | 11 | 11 | 11
(United States) L Zhang | 5 | 5 | 5
WC | (France) C Lutz | 11 | 11 | 11
(Australia) M Jee | 5 | 6 | 9
(Singapore) Zeng J | 10 | 5 | 7
Q | (Thailand) O Paranang | 12 | 11 | 11
(Chinese Taipei) Yeh Y-t | 5 | 12 | 6 | 6
2 | (China) Sun YS | 11 | 10 | 11 | 11

Second round
7 | (China) Chen XT | 11 | 11 | 11
WC | (Singapore) Ser L Q | 6 | 4 | 6
(South Korea) Kim N-y | 3 | 9 | 8
11 | (Japan) S Odo | 11 | 11 | 11
14 | (Japan) H Hashimoto | 11 | 13 | 11
WC | (France) C Lutz | 6 | 11 | 8
Q | (Thailand) O Paranang | 8 | 11 | 12 | 12
2 | (China) Sun YS | 11 | 4 | 10 | 10

Third round
7 | (China) Chen XT | 11 | 11 | 11
11 | (Japan) S Odo | 8 | 8 | 9
14 | (Japan) H Hashimoto | 11 | 11 | 11
Q | (Thailand) O Paranang | 8 | 6 | 9

Quarter-finals
7 | (China) Chen XT | 5 | 8 | 11 | 12 | 11 | 11
14 | (Japan) H Hashimoto | 11 | 11 | 2 | 10 | 3 | 6

== Men's doubles ==
=== Seeds ===
1. (France) Alexis Lebrun / (France) Félix Lebrun (final)
2. (India) Manav Thakkar / (India) Manush Shah (semi-finals)
3. (China) Wen Ruibo / (China) Yuan Licen (semi-finals)
4. (South Korea) Lim Jong-hoon / (South Korea) Oh Jun-sung (champions)
5. (Hong Kong) Wong Chun Ting / (Hong Kong) Baldwin Chan (quarter-finals)
6. (Germany) Benedikt Duda / (Germany) Dang Qiu (second round)
7. (Belgium) Martin Allegro / (Belgium) Adrien Rassenfosse (second round)
8. (Singapore) Izaac Quek / (Singapore) Koen Pang (quarter-finals)

=== Finals ===
Semi-finals
1 | (France) Alexis Lebrun (France) Félix Lebrun | 6 | 11 | 11 | 11
3/WC | (China) Wen Ruibo (China) Yuan Licen | 11 | 5 | 4 | 7
4 | (South Korea) Lim Jong-hoon (South Korea) Oh Jun-sung | 11 | 11 | 11
2 | (India) Manav Thakkar (India) Manush Shah | 8 | 6 | 3

Final
1 | (France) Alexis Lebrun (France) Félix Lebrun | 8 | 11 | 9 | 9
4 | (South Korea) Lim Jong-hoon (South Korea) Oh Jun-sung | 11 | 5 | 11 | 11

=== Top half ===
==== Section 1 ====
First round
(Chinese Taipei) Feng Y-h (Chinese Taipei) Kuo G-h | 11 | 11 | 11
(United States) S Naresh (United States) N Naresh | 5 | 5 | 6
(Romania) E Ionescu (Romania) D Movileanu | 11 | 8 | 5 | 11 | 9
(Croatia) A Gaćina (Croatia) I Ban | 9 | 11 | 11 | 4 | 11

Second round
1 | (France) A Lebrun (France) F Lebrun | 12 | 11 | 11
(Chinese Taipei) Feng Y-h (Chinese Taipei) Kuo G-h | 10 | 7 | 6
(Croatia) A Gaćina (Croatia) I Ban | 5 | 6 | 4
5 | (Hong Kong) Wong C T (Hong Kong) B Chan | 11 | 11 | 11

Quarter-finals
1 | (France) A Lebrun (France) F Lebrun | 11 | 11 | 7 | 11
5 | (Hong Kong) Wong C T (Hong Kong) B Chan | 8 | 8 | 11 | 7

==== Section 2 ====
First round
(Portugal) M Freitas (Portugal) T Apolónia | 11 | 6 | 7 | 5
(Japan) S Matsushima (Japan) S Togami | 7 | 11 | 11 | 11
(Chile) N Burgos (Chile) G Gomez | 12 | 4 | 7 | 6
(Slovenia) D Jorgić (Slovenia) D Kožul | 10 | 11 | 11 | 11

Second round
3/WC | (China) Wen RB (China) Yuan LC | 11 | 9 | 10 | 11 | 16
(Japan) S Matsushima (Japan) S Togami | 5 | 11 | 12 | 6 | 14
(Slovenia) D Jorgić (Slovenia) D Kožul | 9 | 9 | 6
8 | (Singapore) I Quek (Singapore) K Pang | 11 | 11 | 11

Quarter-finals
3/WC | (China) Wen RB (China) Yuan LC | 11 | 11 | 11
8 | (Singapore) I Quek (Singapore) K Pang | 8 | 8 | 7

=== Bottom half ===
==== Section 3 ====
First round
WC | (United States) K Jha (China) Xue F | 11 | 5 | 10 | 5
(Sweden) A Källberg (Sweden) K Karlsson | 7 | 11 | 12 | 11
WC | (China) Zhou GH (China) Li HC | 11 | 8 | 11 | 11
(Slovakia) Ľ Pištej (Slovakia) J Zelinka | 4 | 11 | 2 | 4

Second round
6 | (Germany) B Duda (Germany) D Qiu | 8 | 11 | 11 | 5 | 5
(Sweden) A Källberg (Sweden) K Karlsson | 11 | 6 | 6 | 11 | 11
WC | (China) Zhou GH (China) Li HC | 4 | 6 | 5
4 | (South Korea) Lim J-h (South Korea) Oh J-s | 11 | 11 | 11

Quarter-finals
(Sweden) A Källberg (Sweden) K Karlsson | 8 | 10 | 8
4 | (South Korea) Lim J-h (South Korea) Oh J-s | 11 | 12 | 11

==== Section 4 ====
First round
WC | (China) Liang JK (China) Xiang P | 11 | 11 | 11
(Egypt) Y Abdelaziz (Egypt) M Elbeiali | 6 | 6 | 2
(England) T Jarvis (England) C Green | 8 | 6 | 14 | 7
(China) Chen JS (China) Zhou QH | 11 | 11 | 12 | 11

Second round
7 | (Belgium) M Allegro (Belgium) A Rassenfosse | 7 | 4 | 11 | 5
WC | (China) Liang JK (China) Xiang P | 11 | 11 | 8 | 11
(China) Chen JS (China) Zhou QH | 5 | 6 | 11 | 11 | 10
2 | (India) M Thakkar (India) M Shah | 11 | 11 | 2 | 7 | 12

Quarter-finals
WC | (China) Liang JK (China) Xiang P | 9 | 5 | 4
2 | (India) M Thakkar (India) M Shah | 11 | 11 | 11

== Women's doubles ==
=== Seeds ===
1. (Japan) Miwa Harimoto / (Japan) Hina Hayata (final)
2. (China) Wang Manyu / (China) Kuai Man (champions)
3. (South Korea) Shin Yu-bin / (South Korea) Joo Cheon-hui (second round)
4. (Japan) Miyu Nagasaki / (South Korea) Kim Na-yeong (quarter-finals)
5. (Hong Kong) Doo Hoi Kem / (Hong Kong) Ng Wing Lam (second round)
6. (India) Diya Chitale / (India) Yashaswini Ghorpade (second round)
7. (Chinese Taipei) Chien Tung-chuan / (Chinese Taipei) Li Yu-jhun (quarter-finals)
8. (Wales) Anna Hursey / (China) Shi Xunyao (second round)

=== Finals ===
Semi-finals
1 | (Japan) Miwa Harimoto (Japan) Hina Hayata | 11 | 11 | 7 | 11
WC | (China) Wang Yidi (China) Jiang Yiyi | 9 | 6 | 11 | 7
WC | (China) Chen Yi (China) Li Yihui | 4 | 9 | 11 | 8
2 | (China) Wang Manyu (China) Kuai Man | 11 | 11 | 7 | 11

Final
1 | (Japan) Miwa Harimoto (Japan) Hina Hayata | 11 | 2 | 11 | 7
2 | (China) Wang Manyu (China) Kuai Man | 13 | 11 | 9 | 11

=== Top half ===
==== Section 1 ====
First round
(Germany) A Kaufmann (Germany) N Mittelham | 9 | 11 | 5 | 8
(France) C Lutz (France) P Pavade | 11 | 3 | 11 | 11
(Singapore) Loy M Y (Singapore) Ser L Q | 11 | 11 | 11 | 11
(Brazil) G Takahashi (Brazil) L Watanabe | 9 | 13 | 8 | 9

Second round
1 | (Japan) M Harimoto (Japan) H Hayata | 11 | 11 | 11
(France) C Lutz (France) P Pavade | 8 | 3 | 4
(Singapore) Loy M Y (Singapore) Ser L Q | 7 | 8 | 6
7 | (Chinese Taipei) Chien T-c (Chinese Taipei) Li Y-j | 11 | 11 | 11

Quarter-finals
3 | (Japan) M Harimoto (Japan) H Hayata | 11 | 10 | 11 | 8 | 11
7 | (Chinese Taipei) Chien T-c (Chinese Taipei) Li Y-j | 9 | 12 | 9 | 11 | 6

==== Section 2 ====
First round
(Germany) X Shan (Singapore) Zeng J | 5 | 7 | 4
WC | (China) Wang YD (China) Jiang YY | 11 | 11 | 11
(Turkey) E Haraç (Turkey) S Altınkaya | 7 | 11 | 11 | 11
(Romania) B Szőcs (Romania) E Samara | 11 | 9 | 13 | 13

Second round
3 | (South Korea) Shin Y-b (South Korea) Joo C-h | 5 | 7 | 5
WC | (China) Wang YD (China) Jiang YY | 11 | 11 | 11
(Romania) B Szőcs (Romania) E Samara | 8 | 10 | 11 | 11 | 11
5 | (Hong Kong) Doo H K (Hong Kong) Ng W L | 11 | 12 | 6 | 9 | 6

Quarter-finals
WC | (China) Wang YD (China) Jiang YY | 11 | 12 | 11
(Romania) B Szőcs (Romania) E Samara | 9 | 10 | 7

=== Bottom half ===
==== Section 3 ====
First round
WC | (China) Wang XT (China) Xu Y | 9 | 9 | 4
WC | (China) Chen Y (China) Li YH | 11 | 11 | 11
(United States) L Zhang (United States) S Moyland | 7 | 13 | 5 | 11 | 11
(Egypt) H Goda (Egypt) D Meshref | 11 | 11 | 11 | 9 | 8

Second round
8 | (Wales) A Hursey (China) Shi XY | 10 | 5 | 9
WC | (China) Chen Y (China) Li YH | 12 | 11 | 11
(United States) L Zhang (United States) S Moyland | 3 | 11 | 13 | 13
4 | (Japan) M Nagasaki (South Korea) Kim N-y | 11 | 9 | 15 | 15

Quarter-finals
WC | (China) Chen Y (China) Li YH | 11 | 4 | 11 | 6 | 11
4 | (Japan) M Nagasaki (South Korea) Kim N-y | 5 | 11 | 8 | 11 | 8

==== Section 4 ====
First round
WC | (China) Gao YX (China) Xiang JL | 16 | 11 | 11
(Chile) D Ortega (Chile) P Vega | 14 | 5 | 4
(Australia) Y Liu (Germany) Y Wan | w | / | o
(Poland) N Bajor (Slovakia) T Kukuľková

Second round
6 | (India) D Chitale (India) Y Ghorpade | 12 | 4 | 7 | 11 | 8
WC | (China) Gao YX (China) Xiang JL | 10 | 11 | 11 | 8 | 11
(Australia) Y Liu (Germany) Y Wan | 5 | 10 | 12
2 | (China) Wang MY (China) Kuai M | 11 | 12 | 14

Quarter-finals
WC | (China) Gao YX (China) Xiang JL | 4 | 8 | 13
2 | (China) Wang MY (China) Kuai M | 11 | 11 | 15

== Mixed doubles ==
=== Seeds ===
1. (South Korea) Lim Jong-hoon / (South Korea) Shin Yu-bin (champions)
2. (Brazil) Hugo Calderano / (Brazil) Bruna Takahashi (second round)
3. (Hong Kong) Wong Chun Ting / (Hong Kong) Doo Hoi Kem (second round)
4. (China) Huang Youzheng / (China) Chen Yi (quarter-finals)
5. (India) Manush Shah / (India) Diya Chitale (semi-finals)
6. (Germany) Dang Qiu / (Germany) Sabine Winter (second round)
7. (Chinese Taipei) Lin Yun-ju / (Chinese Taipei) Cheng I-ching (final)
8. (Japan) Sora Matsushima / (Japan) Miwa Harimoto (semi-finals)

=== Finals ===
Semi-finals
1 | (South Korea) Lim Jong-hoon (South Korea) Shin Yu-bin | 11 | 13 | 11 | 11
8 | (Japan) Sora Matsushima (Japan) Miwa Harimoto | 7 | 11 | 13 | 7
7 | (Chinese Taipei) Lin Yun-ju (Chinese Taipei) Cheng I-ching | 11 | 9 | 12 | 11
5 | (India) Manush Shah (India) Diya Chitale | 7 | 11 | 10 | 4

Final
1 | (South Korea) Lim Jong-hoon (South Korea) Shin Yu-bin | 12 | 11 | 16 | 13 | 11
7 | (Chinese Taipei) Lin Yun-ju (Chinese Taipei) Cheng I-ching | 14 | 9 | 18 | 11 | 6

=== Top half ===
==== Section 1 ====
First round
(United States) J Liang (United States) S Moyland | 11 | 11 | 11
WC | (United States) B Botha (China) Shi XY | 5 | 9 | 4
(Slovakia) Ľ Pištej (Slovakia) T Kukuľková | 0 | 0 | 0
(Denmark) A Lind (Wales) A Hursey | 11 | 11 | 11

Second round
1 | (South Korea) Lim J-h (South Korea) Shin Y-b | 11 | 11 | 11
(United States) J Liang (United States) S Moyland | 8 | 2 | 5
(Denmark) A Lind (Wales) A Hursey | 10 | 11 | 12 | 14 | 11
6 | (Germany) D Qiu (Germany) S Winter | 12 | 7 | 14 | 12 | 7

Quarter-finals
1 | (South Korea) Lim J-h (South Korea) Shin Y-b | 11 | 11 | 14
(Denmark) A Lind (Wales) A Hursey | 2 | 5 | 12

==== Section 2 ====
First round
(Germany) P Franziska (Puerto Rico) A Díaz | 11 | 3 | 4 | 12 | 11
WC | (China) Yuan LC (China) Wang YD | 5 | 11 | 11 | 10 | 13
(Croatia) I Ban (Croatia) H Arapović | 2 | 7 | 7
(Hong Kong) B Chan (South Korea) Kim N-y | 11 | 11 | 11

Second round
4/WC | (China) Huang YZ (China) Chen Y | 11 | 11 | 11
WC | (China) Yuan LC (China) Wang YD | 8 | 6 | 7
(Hong Kong) B Chan (South Korea) Kim N-y | 17 | 6 | 10 | 4
8 | (Japan) S Matsushima (Japan) M Harimoto | 15 | 11 | 12 | 11

Quarter-finals
4/WC | (China) Huang YZ (China) Chen Y | 11 | 9 | 11 | 5 | 5
8 | (Japan) S Matsushima (Japan) M Harimoto | 5 | 11 | 9 | 11 | 11

=== Bottom half ===
==== Section 3 ====
First round
(Chile) G Gomez (Chile) D Ortega | 3 | 11 | 11 | 11 | 11
(England) C Green (England) T-T Ho | 11 | 13 | 6 | 7 | 13
(France) A Lebrun (France) C Lutz | 9 | 11 | 11 | 14
(Sweden) K Karlsson (Sweden) C Källberg | 11 | 8 | 5 | 12

Second round
7 | (Chinese Taipei) Lin Y-j (Chinese Taipei) Cheng I-c | 11 | 11 | 11
(England) C Green (England) T-T Ho | 8 | 5 | 5
(France) A Lebrun (France) C Lutz | 8 | 11 | 11 | 11
3 | (Hong Kong) Wong C T (Hong Kong) Doo H K | 11 | 9 | 5 | 7

Quarter-finals
7 | (Chinese Taipei) Lin Y-j (Chinese Taipei) Cheng I-c | 11 | 9 | 11 | 11
(France) A Lebrun (France) C Lutz | 5 | 11 | 4 | 6

==== Section 4 ====
First round
(Turkey) A Yigenler (Turkey) E Haraç | 11 | 2 | 11 | 9 | 10
(Egypt) Y Abdelaziz (Egypt) M Alhodaby | 9 | 11 | 9 | 11 | 12
(Singapore) K Pang (Singapore) Zeng J | 6 | 9 | 6
(Romania) E Ionescu (Romania) B Szőcs | 11 | 11 | 11

Second round
5 | (India) M Shah (India) D Chitale | 11 | 11 | 11
(Egypt) Y Abdelaziz (Egypt) M Alhodaby | 7 | 5 | 4
(Romania) E Ionescu (Romania) B Szőcs | 11 | 8 | 11 | 3 | 11
2 | (Brazil) H Calderano (Brazil) B Takahashi | 9 | 11 | 9 | 11 | 8

Quarter-finals
5 | (India) M Shah (India) D Chitale | 11 | 13 | 11
(Romania) E Ionescu (Romania) B Szőcs | 9 | 11 | 3

| Preceded by WTT Star Contender Astana 2026 | 2026 WTT Series | Succeeded by WTT Champions Montpellier 2026 |
