= 2022 World Team Table Tennis Championships – Men's team =

Men's team at the 2022 World Team Table Tennis Championships
- Venue: High Technology Zone Sports Center
- Location: Chengdu, China
- Dates: 30 September – 9 October
- Teams: 32

Medalists
gold medal	Fan Zhendong; Ma Long; Liang Jingkun; Wang Chuqin; Lin Gaoyuan	China
silver medal	Dang Qiu; Benedikt Duda; Ricardo Walther; Fanbo Meng; Kay Stumper	Germany
bronze medal	Tomokazu Harimoto; Shunsuke Togami; Mizuki Oikawa; Jo Yokotani	Japan
bronze medal	Jang Woo-jin; An Jae-hyun; Cho Seung-min; Cho Dae-seong; Hwang Min-ha	South Korea

The men's team tournament of the 2022 World Team Table Tennis Championships was held from 30 September to 9 October 2022.

China won the final against Germany.

== Format ==
The 32 teams were drawn into seven groups. After a round robin in each group, the top two teams in groups and two highest-ranked third-placed teams played in the knockout stage. A team match consisted of five singles matches, where each singles match was decided in best-of-5 games.

== Draw ==
The draw took place on 28 September. The top seven teams in the world ranking were seeded as top of each group.

Group 1–4 (five teams)
Seeds	China (1); Germany (2); Japan (3); South Korea (4)
Pot 2	Hong Kong (12); France (13); Slovenia (14); Egypt (15)
Pot 3	India (17); United States (18); Romania (20); Czech Republic (21)
Pot 6	Kazakhstan (29); Iran (31); Puerto Rico (32); Canada (34)
Pot 7	Hungary (39); Thailand (58); Saudi Arabia (60); Uzbekistan (71)

Group 5–7 (four teams)
Seeds	Sweden (5); Brazil (6); Chinese Taipei (7)
Pot 1	England (8); Portugal (9); Croatia (10)
Pot 4	Australia (22); Belgium (23); Denmark (24)
Pot 5	Slovakia (25); Poland (27); Singapore (28)

== Group stage ==
All times are local (UTC+8).

=== Group 1 ===
Pos	Team	Pld	W	L	MF	MA	MD	Pts	Qualification
1	China	4	4	0	12	0	+12	8	Round of 16
2	Slovenia	4	3	1	9	4	+5	7	Round of 16
3	United States	4	2	2	6	9	−3	6	
4	Puerto Rico	4	1	3	5	9	−4	5	
5	Thailand	4	0	4	2	12	−10	4	

Source: World Table Tennis

30 September 2022; 10:00	Slovenia	3–1	Puerto Rico

	Individual matches
Darko Jorgić	3–0	Daniel González	11–8, 11–8, 11–8
Deni Kožul	3–0	Brian Afanador	11–7, 11–7, 13–11
Peter Hribar	1–3	Ángel Naranjo	11–9, 9–11, 7–11, 6–11
Darko Jorgić	3–0	Brian Afanador	11–9, 11–9, 13–11

30 September 2022; 10:00	United States	3–2	Thailand

	Individual matches
Mishel Levinski	2–3	Phakpoom Sanguansin	9–11, 11–6, 7–11, 11–9, 9–11
Jishan Liang	3–0	Pattaratorn Passara	11–7, 11–4, 11–5
Earl James Alto	0–3	Sarayut Tancharoen	8–11, 8–11, 8–11
Jishan Liang	3–2	Phakpoom Sanguansin	11–8, 11–9, 3–11, 9–11, 11–6
Mishel Levinski	3–0	Pattaratorn Passara	11–8, 11–7, 11–4

1 October 2022; 16:00	Slovenia	3–0	Thailand

	Individual matches
Deni Kožul	3–0	Phakpoom Sanguansin	14–12, 11–5, 11–3
Darko Jorgić	3–0	Sarayut Tancharoen	11–6, 11–9, 11–7
Peter Hribar	3–2	Pattaratorn Passara	9–11, 11–4, 11–7, 9–11, 11–8

1 October 2022; 16:00	China	3–0	Puerto Rico

	Individual matches
Fan Zhendong	3–0	Brian Afanador	11–2, 11–4, 11–7
Ma Long	3–0	Daniel González	11–6, 11–2, 11–6
Wang Chuqin	3–1	Ángel Naranjo	11–1, 11–7, 8–11, 11–4

2 October 2022; 10:00	Puerto Rico	3–0	Thailand

	Individual matches
Brian Afanador	3–1	Sarayut Tancharoen	5–11, 11–6, 11–7, 12–10
Daniel González	3–0	Phakpoom Sanguansin	11–9, 11–9, 11–6
Ángel Naranjo	3–0	Pattaratorn Passara	15–13, 12–10, 12–10

2 October 2022; 19:00	China	3–0	United States

	Individual matches
Ma Long	3–1	Mishel Levinski	7–11, 11–6, 11–4, 11–2
Liang Jingkun	3–0	Jishan Liang	11–8, 11–3, 11–6
Lin Gaoyuan	3–0	Earl James Alto	11–6, 11–6, 11–5

3 October 2022; 10:00	United States	3–1	Puerto Rico

	Individual matches
Jishan Liang	3–1	Brian Afanador	11–6, 11–7, 10–12, 11–8
Mishel Levinski	3–0	Daniel González	11–6, 11–5, 11–9
Earl Alto	0–3	Ángel Naranjo	4–11, 11–13, 7–11
Jishan Liang	3–0	Daniel González	11–5, 11–4, 11–2

3 October 2022; 19:00	China	3–0	Slovenia

	Individual matches
Fan Zhendong	3–0	Den Kozul	11–7, 11–6, 11–5
Wang Chuqin	3–1	Darko Jorgić	11–6, 7–11, 11–7, 11–9
Ma Long	3–0	Tilen Cvetko	11–8, 11–5, 11–4

4 October 2022; 16:00	China	3–0	Thailand

	Individual matches
Lin Gaoyuan	3–1	Phakpoom Sanguansin	12–10, 11–13, 11–1, 11–3
Fan Zhendong	3–0	Sarayut Tancharoen	11–9, 11–8, 11–6
Liang Jingkun	3–1	Pattaratorn Passara	8–11, 11–5, 11–3, 11–4

4 October 2022; 16:00	Slovenia	3–0	United States

	Individual matches
Darko Jorgić	3–0	Mishel Levinski	11–7, 11–6, 11–4
Deni Kožul	3–2	Jishan Liang	9–11, 10–12, 11–6, 11–7, 11–8
Peter Hribar	3–2	Earl James Alto	11–4, 5–11, 11–4, 7–11, 11–8

=== Group 2 ===
Pos	Team	Pld	W	L	MF	MA	MD	Pts	Qualification
1	France	4	3	1	10	3	+7	7	Round of 16
2	Germany	4	3	1	10	4	+6	7	Round of 16
3	India	4	3	1	9	6	+3	7	Round of 16
4	Kazakhstan	4	1	3	5	9	−4	5	
5	Uzbekistan	4	0	4	0	12	−12	4	

Source: World Table Tennis

30 September 2022; 13:00	France	3–0	Uzbekistan

	Individual matches
Alexis Lebrun	3–0	Abulaziz Anorboev	11–2, 11–7, 11–3
Félix Lebrun	3–0	Elmurod Kholikov	11–6, 11–1, 11–2
Jules Rolland	3–0	Shokhrukh Iskandarov	11–3, 11–6, 11–4

30 September 2022; 13:00	Germany	3–0	Kazakhstan

	Individual matches
Benedikt Duda	3–1	Kirill Gerassimenko	8–11, 11–5, 11–8, 11–9
Dang Qiu	3–0	Denis Zholudev	11–5, 11–8, 11–4
Ricardo Walther	3–0	Alan Kurmangaliyev	11–5, 11–5, 11–6

1 October 2022; 10:00	India	3–0	Uzbekistan

	Individual matches
Harmeet Desai	3–0	Elmurod Kholikov	11–9, 11–9, 11–1
Sathiyan Gnanasekaran	3–0	Abdulaziz Anorboev	11–3, 11–6, 11–9
Manav Thakkar	3–0	Shokhrukh Iskandarov	11–8, 11–5, 11–5

1 October 2022; 10:00	France	3–0	Kazakhstan

	Individual matches
Félix Lebrun	3–0	Kirill Gerassimenko	11–5, 11–5, 11–9
Alexis Lebrun	3–1	Denis Zholudev	11–5, 11–9, 9–11, 11–3
Emmanuel Lebesson	3–1	Aidos Kenzhigulov	11–4, 11–8, 9–11, 11–6

2 October 2022; 13:00	Germany	1–3	India

	Individual matches
Benedikt Duda	2–3	Sathiyan Gnanasekaran	13–11, 11–4, 8–11, 4–11, 9–11
Dang Qiu	3–1	Harmeet Desai	11–7, 11–9, 11–13, 11–3
Ricardo Walther	1–3	Manav Thakkar	11–13, 11–6, 8–11, 10–12
Dang Qiu	2–3	Sathiyan Gnanasekaran	12–10, 11–7, 8–11, 8–11, 9–11

2 October 2022; 13:00	Kazakhstan	3–0	Uzbekistan

	Individual matches
Denis Zholudev	3–0	Abdulaziz Anorboev	11–6, 11–6, 11–8
Kirill Gerassimenko	3–0	Shokhrukh Iskandarov	11–2, 11–6, 11–8
Alan Kurmangaliyev	3–0	Elmurod Kholikov	11–5, 11–2, 12–10

3 October 2022; 13:00	Germany	3–1	France

	Individual matches
Dang Qiu	3–1	Félix Lebrun	13–11, 11–9, 9–11, 11–6
Benedikt Duda	0–3	Alexis Lebrun	9–11, 7–11, 8–11
Kay Stumper	3–2	Emmanuel Lebesson	11–9, 7–11, 13–11, 8–11, 11–8
Dang Qiu	3–0	Alexis Lebrun	11–7, 11–6, 11–3

3 October 2022; 13:00	India	3–2	Kazakhstan

	Individual matches
Sathiyan Gnanasekaran	3–0	Denis Zholudev	11–1, 11–9, 11–5
Harmeet Desai	0–3	Kirill Gerassimenko	6–11, 8–11, 9–11
Manav Thakkar	3–0	Alan Kurmangaliyev	12–10, 11–1, 11–8
Sathiyan Gnanasekaran	2–3	Kirill Gerassimenko	11–6, 5–11, 14–12, 9–11, 6–11
Harmeet Desai	3–0	Denis Zholudev	12–10, 11–9, 11–6

4 October 2022; 13:00	Germany	3–0	Uzbekistan

	Individual matches
Dang Qiu	3–0	Shokhrukh Iskandarov	11–5, 11–9, 11–5
Benedikt Duda	3–0	Abdulaziz Anorboev	11–3, 11–5, 11–8
Kay Stumper	3–0	Elmurod Kholikov	11–4, 11–3, 11–8

4 October 2022; 13:00	France	3–0	India

	Individual matches
Alexis Lebrun	3–0	Manav Thakkar	11–6, 11–8, 11–8
Felix Lebrun	3–0	Sathiyan Gnanasekaran	11–4, 11–2, 11–6
Jules Rolland	3–2	Harmeet Desai	11–13, 13–11, 7–11, 11–8, 11–7

=== Group 3 ===
Pos	Team	Pld	W	L	MF	MA	MD	Pts	Qualification
1	Japan	4	4	0	12	4	+8	8	Round of 16
2	Hong Kong	4	2	2	9	9	0	6	Round of 16
3	Romania	4	2	2	10	10	0	6	
4	Hungary	4	2	2	8	10	−2	6	
5	Iran	4	0	4	6	12	−6	4	

Source: World Table Tennis

30 September 2022; 16:00	Japan	3–0	Iran

	Individual matches
Shunsuke Togami	3–0	Noshad Alamian	11–8, 11–5, 11–9
Tomokazu Harimoto	3–1	Nima Alamian	8–11, 12–10, 11–5, 11–8
Mizuki Oikawa	3–2	Amir Hossein Hodaei	5–11, 11–5, 9–11, 11–7, 11–9

30 September 2022; 19:00	Hong Kong	3–1	Hungary

	Individual matches
Lam Siu-hang	1–3	Ádám Szudi	7–11, 5–11, 11–4, 8–11
Wong Chun-ting	3–0	Tamás Lakatos	16–14, 12–10, 11–6
Ng Pak Nam	3–1	Nándor Ecseki	3–11, 13–11, 13–11, 12–10
Wong Chun-ting	3–2	Adam Szudi	11–7, 14–16, 11–4, 10–12, 12–10

1 October 2022; 13:00	Hong Kong	3–2	Iran

	Individual matches
Ng Pak Nam	0–3	Nima Alamian	7–11, 5–11, 5–11
Wong Chun-ting	3–0	Amir Hossein Hodaei	11–3, 11–6, 11–4
Lam Siu-hang	0–3	Noshad Alamian	6–11, 3–11, 6–11
Wong Chun-ting	3–2	Nima Alamian	6–11, 7–11, 17–15, 11–8, 11–9
Ng Pak Nam	3–1	Amir Hossein Hodaei	9–11, 11–9, 11–9, 11–8

1 October 2022; 16:00	Romania	2–3	Hungary

	Individual matches
Hunor Szőcs	2–3	Ádám Szudi	11–9, 11–9, 11–13, 6–11, 4–11
Ovidiu Ionescu	3–1	Bence Majoros	11–5, 11–8, 7–11, 11–4
Eduard Ionescu	1–3	Tamás Lakatos	11–5, 6–11, 6–11, 3–11
Ovidiu Ionescu	3–1	Ádám Szudi	7–11, 11–2, 11–8, 11–8
Hunor Szőcs	0–3	Bence Majoros	8–11, 6–11, 6–11

2 October 2022; 16:00	Japan	3–2	Romania

	Individual matches
Tomokazu Harimoto	3–0	Eduard Ionescu	11–5, 11–7, 11–9
Shunsuke Togami	3–2	Ovidiu Ionescu	12–10, 7–11, 11–9, 11–13, 14–12
Mizuki Oikawa	0–3	Hunor Szőcs	6–11, 5–11, 9–11
Tomokazu Harimoto	1–3	Ovidiu Ionescu	8–11, 6–11, 11–7, 5–11
Shunsuke Togami	3–0	Eduard Ionescu	11–8, 11–3, 11–4

2 October 2022; 16:00	Iran	2–3	Hungary

	Individual matches
Nima Alamian	0–3	Ádám Szudi	6–11, 9–11, 8–11
Noshad Alamiyan	3–0	Nándor Ecseki	12–10, 11–8, 11–8
Amir Hossein Hodaei	2–3	Tamás Lakatos	7–11, 11–5, 9–11, 13–11, 3–11
Noshad Alamiyan	3–1	Ádám Szudi	11–9, 6–11, 11–6, 11–8
Nima Alamian	1–3	Nándor Ecseki	11–13, 11–6, 1–11, 7–11

3 October 2022; 16:00	Japan	3–1	Hong Kong

	Individual matches
Shunsuke Togami	0–3	Wong Chun-ting	11–13, 4–11, 6–11
Tomokazu Harimoto	3–0	Lam Siu-hang	11–5, 11–7, 11–4
Mizuki Oikawa	3–2	Ng Pak Nam	5–11, 11–7, 7–11, 11–5, 12–10
Tomokazu Harimoto	3–0	Wong Chun-ting	11–4, 11–9, 11–3

3 October 2022; 19:00	Romania	3–2	Iran

	Individual matches
Ovidiu Ionescu	3–1	Soroosh Amiri Nia	11–8, 11–5, 7–11, 11–8
Hunor Szőcs	0–3	Noshad Alamian	7–11, 7–11, 7–11
Eduard Ionescu	3–2	Amir Hossein Hodaei	11–3, 8–11, 15–13, 5–11, 11–9
Ovidiu Ionescu	2–3	Noshad Alamian	9–11, 4–11, 15–13, 11–9, 10–12
Hunor Szőcs	3–2	Soroosh Amiri Nia	11–3, 11–4, 3–11, 3–11, 11–3

4 October 2022; 16:00	Japan	3–1	Hungary

	Individual matches
Tomokazu Harimoto	3–1	Ádám Szudi	8–11, 11–5, 11–7, 11–5
Shunsuke Togami	3–0	Tamás Lakatos	12–10, 11–8, 11–3
Jo Yokotani	2–3	Nándor Ecseki	7–11, 11–8, 7–11, 11–4, 8–11
Tomokazu Harimoto	3–0	Tamás Lakatos	11–7, 11–5, 11–4

4 October 2022; 16:00	Hong Kong	2–3	Romania

	Individual matches
Wong Chun-ting	3–0	Hunor Szőcs	11–5, 14–12, 11–1
Ng Pak Nam	1–3	Ovidiu Ionescu	12–14, 11–6, 9–11, 5–11
Lam Siu-hang	3–2	Eduard Ionescu	9–11, 11–6, 11–4, 10–12, 11–8
Wong Chun-ting	2–3	Ovidiu Ionescu	11–9, 6–11, 11–1, 11–13, 8–11
Ng Pak Nam	2–3	Hunor Szőcs	9–11, 11–7, 8–11, 11–8, 2–11

=== Group 4 ===
Pos	Team	Pld	W	L	MF	MA	MD	Pts	Qualification
1	South Korea	4	4	0	12	1	+11	8	Round of 16
2	Egypt	4	3	1	10	4	+6	7	Round of 16
3	Czech Republic	4	2	2	7	7	0	6	
4	Saudi Arabia	4	1	3	4	10	−6	5	
5	Canada	4	0	4	1	12	−11	4	

Source: World Table Tennis

30 September 2022; 16:00	South Korea	3–0	Canada

	Individual matches
An Jae-hyun	3–0	Edward Ly	11–7, 11–7, 14–12
Jang Woo-jin	3–0	Wang Zexuan	11–6, 11–4, 11–1
Cho Seung-min	3–1	David Xu	11–6, 7–11, 11–7, 11–3

30 September 2022; 16:00	Egypt	3–0	Saudi Arabia

	Individual matches
Youssef Abdel-Aziz	3–0	Ali Al-Khadrawi	11–9, 11–6, 11–2
Mohamed El-Beiali	3–0	Abdulaziz Bu Shulaybi	11–9, 11–4, 13–11
Mohamed Shoman	3–2	Khalid Al-Shareif	7–11, 5–11, 11–9, 11–2, 11–3

1 October 2022; 16:00	Egypt	3–0	Canada

	Individual matches
Youssef Abdel-Aziz	3–0	Edward Ly	12–10, 11–5, 12–10
Mohamed El-Beiali	3–0	David Xu	11–8, 11–1, 11–4
Mohamed Shoman	3–1	Wang Zexuan	11–4, 11–6, 7–11, 11–3

1 October 2022; 16:00	Czech Republic	3–1	Saudi Arabia

	Individual matches
Jan Valenta	2–3	Ali Al-Khadrawi	5–11, 10–12, 11–9, 11–9, 9–11
Tomáš Polanský	3–1	Abdulaziz Bu Shulaybi	11–2, 11–5, 8–11, 11–5
Tomáš Koldas	3–1	Azzam Alim	12–10, 11–8, 7–11, 11–8
Tomáš Polanský	3–0	Ali Al-Khadrawi	11–5, 11–7, 11–5

2 October 2022; 19:00	South Korea	3–0	Czech Republic

	Individual matches
Jang Woo-jin	3–0	Jan Valenta	11–6, 12–10, 11–2
An Jae-hyun	3–1	Tomáš Koldas	11–9, 8–11, 11–6, 11–8
Cho Seung-min	3–0	Tomáš Polanský	11–0, 11–0, 11–0

2 October 2022; 19:00	Canada	1–3	Saudi Arabia

	Individual matches
David Xu	0–3	Ali Al-Khadrawi	5–11, 4–11, 3–11
Edward Ly	0–3	Abdulaziz Bu Shulaybi	5–11, 5–11, 4–11
Wang Zexuan	3–2	Khalid Al-Shareif	11–4, 7–11, 11–13, 11–9, 13–11
Edward Ly	1–3	Ali Al-Khadrawi	10–12, 11–9, 11–13, 6–11

3 October 2022; 16:00	South Korea	3–1	Egypt

	Individual matches
Cho Seung-min	3–1	Mohamed El-Beiali	11–7, 11–8, 9–11, 11–9
Jang Woo-jin	3–0	Youssef Abdel-Aziz	11–5, 11–6, 11–9
An Jae-hyun	0–3	Shady Magdy	8–11, 10–12, 9–11
Jang Woo-jin	3–2	Mohamed El-Beiali	11–8, 5–11, 11–4, 5–11, 11–6

3 October 2022; 16:00	Czech Republic	3–0	Canada

	Individual matches
Tomáš Polanský	3–0	David Xu	11–7, 11–4, 11–3
Tomáš Koldas	3–2	Wang Zexuan	11–4, 11–5, 8–11, 8–11, 11–7
Jan Valenta	3–0	Edward Ly	walkover

4 October 2022; 13:00	South Korea	3–0	Saudi Arabia

	Individual matches
Cho Seung-min	3–2	Abdulaziz Bu Shulaybi	11–6, 9–11, 11–9, 9–11, 11–4
Cho Dae-seong	3–0	Ali Al-Khadrawi	11–8, 11–4, 11–1
Hwang Min-ha	3–1	Azzam Alim	8–11, 11–3, 11–8, 11–3

4 October 2022; 13:00	Egypt	3–1	Czech Republic

	Individual matches
Mohamed El-Beiali	3–1	Tomáš Koldas	11–7, 11–5, 7–11, 14–12
Youssef Abdel-Aziz	2–3	Tomáš Polanský	5–11, 4–11, 11–7, 11–8, 12–14
Shady Magdy	3–0	Jan Valenta	15–13, 11–6, 11–7
Mohamed El-Beiali	3–1	Tomáš Polanský	11–9, 11–8, 9–11, 11–5

=== Group 5 ===
Pos	Team	Pld	W	L	MF	MA	MD	Pts	Qualification
1	Sweden	3	3	0	9	1	+8	6	Round of 16
2	Poland	3	2	1	6	5	+1	5	Round of 16
3	England	3	1	2	6	6	0	4	Round of 16
4	Australia	3	0	3	0	9	−9	3	

Source: World Table Tennis

30 September 2022; 16:00	Sweden	3–0	Australia

	Individual matches
Mattias Falck	3–0	Dillon Chambers	11–1, 11–9, 11–8
Kristian Karlsson	3–0	Fin Luu	11–4, 11–7, 11–4
Anton Källberg	3–0	Lee Yonghun	11–6, 11–4, 12–10

30 September 2022; 16:00	England	2–3	Poland

	Individual matches
David McBeath	1–3	Samuel Kulczycki	14–12, 5–11, 5–11, 4–11
Liam Pitchford	3–0	Miłosz Redzimski	11–7, 11–4, 12–10
Sam Walker	1–3	Maciej Kubik	11–6, 10–12, 8–11, 9–11
Liam Pitchford	3–0	Samuel Kulczycki	13–11, 11–6, 11–6
David McBeath	0–3	Miłosz Redzimski	7–11, 9–11, 8–11

1 October 2022; 16:00	Australia	0–3	Poland

	Individual matches
Dillon Chambers	0–3	Samuel Kulczycki	4–11, 4–11, 9–11
Nicholas Lum	2–3	Miłosz Redzimski	11–5, 11–8, 12–14, 5–11, 9–11
Fin Luu	0–3	Maciej Kubik	5–11, 8–11, 8–11

1 October 2022; 19:00	Sweden	3–1	England

	Individual matches
Truls Möregårdh	3–1	Sam Walker	11–5, 9–11, 11–3, 11–5
Anton Källberg	1–3	Liam Pitchford	8–11, 11–5, 9–11, 9–11
Kristian Karlsson	3–0	David McBeath	11–9, 11–4, 11–4
Truls Möregårdh	3–1	Liam Pitchford	11–8, 11–7, 7–11, 11–7

4 October 2022; 13:00	Sweden	3–0	Poland

	Individual matches
Truls Möregårdh	3–0	Samuel Kulczycki	11–9, 11–7, 15–13
Kristian Karlsson	3–0	Maciej Kubik	11–5, 11–9, 11–6
Mattias Falck	3–2	Miłosz Redzimski	7–11, 11–7, 14–12, 11–6, 11–8

4 October 2022; 19:00	England	3–0	Australia

	Individual matches
Sam Walker	3–1	Nicholas Lum	9–11, 11–8, 11–7, 11–8
Liam Pitchford	3–0	Lee Yonghun	11–5, 11–7, 11–7
David McBeath	3–2	Fin Luu	4–11, 11–1, 13–11, 9–11, 11–3

=== Group 6 ===
Pos	Team	Pld	W	L	MF	MA	MD	Pts	Qualification
1	Portugal	3	2	1	7	6	+1	5	Round of 16
2	Brazil	3	2	1	8	4	+4	5	Round of 16
3	Slovakia	3	1	2	4	7	−3	4	
4	Denmark	3	1	2	5	7	−2	4	

Source: World Table Tennis

30 September 2022; 10:00	Brazil	3–1	Denmark

	Individual matches
Hugo Calderano	3–0	Martin Buch Andersen	11–5, 11–5, 11–3
Vitor Ishiy	1–3	Anders Lind	9–11, 11–6, 8–11, 9–11
Eric Jouti	3–1	Tobias Rasmussen	11–7, 9–11, 12–10, 11–5
Hugo Calderano	3–1	Anders Lind	9–11, 11–9, 11–6, 11–9

30 September 2022; 19:00	Portugal	3–1	Slovakia

	Individual matches
João Geraldo	2–3	Wang Yang	11–6, 4–11, 16–14, 10–12, 5–11
Marcos Freitas	3–0	Jakub Zelinka	11–9, 11–6, 11–4
João Monteiro	3–1	Adam Klajber	5–11, 11–4, 11–4, 11–6
Marcos Freitas	3–1	Wang Yang	8–11, 12–10, 11–8, 14–12

2 October 2022; 16:00	Brazil	2–3	Portugal

	Individual matches
Hugo Calderano	3–2	João Geraldo	13–11, 6–11, 11–8, 7–11, 11–8
Eric Jouti	0–3	Marcos Freitas	4–11, 6–11, 5–11
Vitor Ishiy	2–3	João Monteiro	10–12, 11–4, 11–9, 5–11, 8–11
Hugo Calderano	3–1	Marcos Freitas	11–8, 9–11, 11–9, 11–7
Eric Jouti	1–3	João Geraldo	11–7, 4–11, 7–11, 4–11

2 October 2022; 19:00	Denmark	1–3	Slovakia

	Individual matches
Tobias Rasmussen	0–3	Wang Yang	1–11, 7–11, 2–11
Anders Lind	3–0	Adam Klajber	11–5, 11–4, 11–5
Martin Buch Andersen	2–3	Jakub Zelinka	11–6, 11–7, 6–11, 8–11, 8–11
Anders Lind	1–3	Wang Yang	1–11, 8–11, 11–7, 7–11

4 October 2022; 10:00	Brazil	3–0	Slovakia

	Individual matches
Hugo Calderano	3–2	Wang Yang	11–9, 9–11, 7–11, 13–11, 11–8
Vitor Ishiy	3–0	Jakub Zelinka	11–8, 11–2, 11–8
Eric Jouti	3–0	Adam Klajber	13–11, 11–8, 11–3

4 October 2022; 10:00	Portugal	1–3	Denmark

	Individual matches
Diogo Chen	0–3	Thor Christensen	6–11, 9–11, 8–11
João Geraldo	3–1	Anders Lind	11–9, 11–9, 8–11, 11–5
João Monteiro	0–3	Tobias Rasmussen	12–14, 9–11, 8–11
Diogo Chen	1–3	Anders Lind	8–11, 11–6, 5–11, 14–16

=== Group 7 ===
Pos	Team	Pld	W	L	MF	MA	MD	Pts	Qualification
1	Croatia	3	3	0	9	4	+5	6	Round of 16
2	Belgium	3	2	1	7	4	+3	5	Round of 16
3	Singapore	3	1	2	5	7	−2	4	
4	Chinese Taipei	3	0	3	3	9	−6	3	

Source: World Table Tennis

1 October 2022; 19:00	Chinese Taipei	1–3	Belgium

	Individual matches
Chuang Chih-yuan	3–1	Martin Allegro	11–3, 13–11, 4–11, 11–6
Liao Cheng-ting	0–3	Cedric Nuytinck	5–11, 9–11, 4–11
Huang Yan-cheng	1–3	Adrien Rassenfosse	10–12, 11–8, 11–13, 7–11
Chuang Chih-yuan	1–3	Cedric Nuytinck	8–11, 14–16, 11–5, 8–11

1 October 2022; 19:00	Croatia	3–2	Singapore

	Individual matches
Andrej Gaćina	3–0	Clarence Chew	11–8, 12–10, 11–7
Tomislav Pucar	0–3	Pang Yew En Koen	4–11, 8–11, 7–11
Filip Zeljko	0–3	Izaac Quek	9–11, 7–11, 9–11
Andrej Gaćina	3–2	Pang Yew En Koen	14–16, 5–11, 11–8, 11–2, 15–13
Tomislav Pucar	3–2	Clarence Chew	11–8, 8–11, 8–11, 11–6, 11–9

2 October 2022; 16:00	Chinese Taipei	1–3	Croatia

	Individual matches
Peng Wang-wei	0–3	Andrej Gaćina	4–11, 9–11, 7–11
Liao Cheng-ting	3–1	Tomislav Pucar	5–11, 14–12, 11–8, 15–13
Huang Yan-cheng	0–3	Filip Zelko	5–11, 4–11, 8–11
Liao Cheng-ting	1–3	Andrej Gaćina	7–11, 9–11, 12–10, 9–11

2 October 2022; 16:00	Belgium	3–0	Singapore

	Individual matches
Martin Allegro	3–1	Pang Yew En Koen	11–13, 11–5, 11–9, 13–11
Cedric Nuytinck	3–1	Clarence Chew	11–3, 11–9, 6–11, 11–6
Adrien Rassenfosse	3–1	Izaac Quek	11–3, 6–11, 11–7, 11–3

3 October 2022; 10:00	Chinese Taipei	1–3	Singapore

	Individual matches
Huang Yan-cheng	3–0	Clarence Chew	11–5, 11–8, 11–1
Liao Cheng-ting	1–3	Izaac Quek	8–11, 11–13, 11–9, 7–11
Peng Wang-wei	1–3	Beh Kun Ting	11–3, 7–11, 8–11, 9–11
Liao Cheng-ting	1–3	Clarence Chew	6–11, 11–5, 6–11, 8–11

3 October 2022; 10:00	Croatia	3–1	Belgium

	Individual matches
Andrej Gaćina	2–3	Cedric Nuytinck	8–11, 8–11, 11–9, 12–10, 9–11
Filip Zelko	3–2	Martin Allegro	11–3, 7–11, 7–11, 11–6, 11–7
Tomislav Pucar	3–1	Adrien Rassenfosse	8–11, 11–7, 11–6, 11–4
Filip Zelko	3–1	Cedric Nuytinck	10–12, 11–8, 12–10, 11–7

== Knockout stage ==
Round of 16
China	3
India	0
Belgium	0
Sweden	3
Portugal	3
Slovenia	0
Brazil	0
Japan	3
South Korea	3
Poland	0
Hong Kong	3
Egypt	0
Croatia	0
Germany	3
England	2
France	3

Quarter-finals
China	3
Sweden	0
Portugal	1
Japan	3
South Korea	3
Hong Kong	1
Germany	3
France	2

Semi-finals
China	3
Japan	2
South Korea	2
Germany	3

Final
China	3
Germany	0

=== Round of 16 ===
5 October 2022; 11:00	South Korea	3–0	Poland

	Individual matches
Cho Seung-min	3–0	Samuel Kulczycki	11–8, 11–9, 11–8
Jang Woo-jin	3–0	Miłosz Redzimski	11–8, 11–2, 13–11
Cho Dae-seong	3–0	Maciej Kubik	11–8, 15–13, 12–10

5 October 2022; 11:00	Hong Kong	3–0	Egypt

	Individual matches
Ng Pak Nam	3–0	Mohamed El-Beiali	11–3, 11–7, 11–8
Wong Chun-ting	3–0	Youssef Abdel-Aziz	11–5, 12–10, 11–9
Lam Siu-hang	3–2	Shady Magdy	11–13, 11–4, 11–3, 8–11, 11–7

5 October 2022; 15:00	Brazil	0–3	Japan

	Individual matches
Hugo Calderano	1–3	Shunsuke Togami	13–11, 10–12, 8–11, 7–11
Eric Jouti	0–3	Tomokazu Harimoto	4–11, 5–11, 7–11
Vitor Ishiy	0–3	Mizuki Oikawa	8–11, 4–11, 9–11

5 October 2022; 19:30	England	2–3	France

	Individual matches
Liam Pitchford	3–2	Félix Lebrun	8–11, 11–9, 2–11, 11–7, 11–7
Sam Walker	0–3	Alexis Lebrun	5–11, 4–11 9–11
David McBeath	2–3	Jules Rolland	6–11, 11–9, 6–11, 11–8, 7–11
Liam Pitchford	3–2	Alexis Lebrun	9–11, 11–6, 9–11, 11–6, 11–8
Sam Walker	0–3	Félix Lebrun	4–11, 10–12 12–14

6 October 2022; 11:00	Belgium	0–3	Sweden

	Individual matches
Martin Allegro	2–3	Truls Möregårdh	9–11, 11–9, 11–8, 3–11, 6–11
Cedric Nuytinck	1–3	Mattias Falck	14–12, 9–11, 13–15, 8–11
Adrien Rassenfosse	0–3	Anton Källberg	6–11, 9–11, 7–11

6 October 2022; 11:00	Portugal	3–0	Slovenia

	Individual matches
Marcos Freitas	3–1	Deni Kožul	11–8, 11–6, 9–11, 11–7
João Geraldo	3–2	Darko Jorgić	11–6, 11–13, 4–11, 11–9, 11–8
João Monteiro	3–0	Peter Hribar	11–9, 12–10, 11–3

6 October 2022; 15:00	China	3–0	India

	Individual matches
Fan Zhendong	3–0	Harmeet Desai	11–2, 11–9, 11–5
Ma Long	3–0	Sathiyan Gnanasekaran	14–12, 11–5, 11–0
Wang Chuqin	3–0	Manush Utpalbhai Shah	11–4, 11–5, 11–6

6 October 2022; 15:00	Croatia	0–3	Germany

	Individual matches
Andrej Gaćina	0–3	Benedikt Duda	9–11, 3–11, 14–16
Filip Zeljko	0–3	Dang Qiu	5–11, 7–11, 4–11
Tomislav Pucar	1–3	Kay Stumper	11–3, 12–14, 4–11, 4–11

=== Quarterfinals ===
7 October 2022; 11:00	South Korea	3–1	Hong Kong

	Individual matches
Cho Seung-min	2–3	Wong Chun-ting	9–11, 11–6, 9–11, 11–9, 9–11
Jang Woo-jin	3–0	Ng Pak Nam	11–4, 11–3, 11–4
Cho Dae-seong	3–1	Lam Siu-hang	8–11, 11–6, 11–5, 11–4
Jang Woo-jin	3–1	Wong Chun-ting	11–6, 8–11, 11–9, 12–10

7 October 2022; 11:00	Germany	3–2	France

	Individual matches
Benedikt Duda	2–3	Alexis Lebrun	11–5, 11–4, 9–11, 11–13, 11–13
Dang Qiu	1–3	Felix Lebrun	10–12, 8–11, 11–6, 9–11
Kay Stumper	3–1	Jules Rolland	9–11, 11–6, 11–6, 11–4
Dang Qiu	3–1	Alexis Lebrun	12–10, 11–5, 9–11, 11–7
Benedikt Duda	3–0	Felix Lebrun	11–6, 11–7, 12–10

7 October 2022; 15:00	Portugal	1–3	Japan

	Individual matches
Marcos Freitas	1–3	Shunsuke Togami	11–8, 6–11, 4–11, 7–11
João Geraldo	0–3	Tomokazu Harimoto	8–11, 5–11,6–11
João Monteiro	3–2	Mizuki Oikawa	11–6, 5–11, 9–11, 11–9, 11–8
Marcos Freitas	1–3	Tomokazu Harimoto	11–7, 7–11, 4–11, 3–11

7 October 2022; 19:30	China	3–0	Sweden

	Individual matches
Fan Zhendong	3–0	Mattias Falck	11–7, 11–9, 11–5
Ma Long	3–0	Truls Möregårdh	13–11, 11–8, 11–6
Wang Chuqin	3–2	Kristian Karlsson	7–11, 10–12, 11–3, 11–9, 11–6

=== Semifinals ===
8 October 2022; 11:00	South Korea	2–3	Germany

	Individual matches
Jang Woo-jin	1–3	Benedikt Duda	12–10, 7–11, 7–11, 7–11
An Jae-hyun	3–1	Dang Qiu	11–7, 12–10, 6–11, 11–8
Cho Seung-min	3–2	Kay Stumper	11–6, 4–11, 11–5, 9–11, 11–8
Jang Woo-jin	1–3	Dang Qiu	12–14, 7–11, 13–11, 6–11
An Jae-hyun	1–3	Benedikt Duda	9–11, 6–11, 11–8, 6–11

8 October 2022; 15:00	China	3–2	Japan

	Individual matches
Fan Zhendong	3–0	Shunsuke Togami	11–5, 12–10, 11–4
Wang Chuqin	1–3	Tomokazu Harimoto	11–8, 8–11, 6–11, 9–11
Ma Long	3–1	Mizuki Oikawa	8–11, 11–5, 11–5, 11–2
Fan Zhendong	2–3	Tomokazu Harimoto	7–11, 11–6, 11–3, 9–11, 9–11
Wang Chuqin	3–0	Shunsuke Togami	12–10, 11–7, 11–4

=== Final ===
9 October 2022; 19:30	China	3–0	Germany

	Individual matches
Fan Zhendong	3–0	Benedikt Duda	11–8, 11–8, 11–9
Ma Long	3–1	Dang Qiu	11–9, 11–6, 9–11, 11–1
Wang Chuqin	3–0	Kay Stumper	11–7, 11–8, 11–4
