= WTT Champions Macao 2026 =

Table tennis tournament in Macau

WTT Champions Macao 2026 presented by Galaxy Entertainment Group
Tournament details
- Dates: 8–13 September
- Edition: 5th
- Total prize money: US$800,000
- Venue: Macao East Asian Games Dome
- Location: Macau

Champions
- Men's singles: (Sweden) Truls Möregårdh
- Women's singles: (Japan) Miwa Harimoto

The WTT Champions Macao 2026 presented by Galaxy Entertainment Group was a table tennis tournament which took place at the Macao East Asian Games Dome, Macau, from 8 to 13 September and had a total prize of US$800,000.

== Tournament ==
The WTT Champions Macao 2026 was the eighteenth tournament of the 2026 WTT Series and also part of the WTT Champions event.

=== Venue ===
This tournament was held at the Macao East Asian Games Dome in Macau.

=== Point distribution ===
Below is the point distribution table for each phase of the tournament based on the WTT World Ranking for the WTT Champions event.

Event	Winner	Finalist	Semi-finalist	Quarter-finalist	Round of 16	Round of 32
Singles	1000	700	450	300	140	15

=== Prize pool ===
The total prize money was US$800,000 with the distribution of the prize money in accordance with WTT regulations.

Event	Winner	Finalist	Semi-finalist	Quarter-finalist	Round of 16	Round of 32
Singles	$60,000	$30,000	$16,000	$12,500	$10,000	$8,000

== Men's singles ==
=== Seeds ===
1. (Japan) Sora Matsushima (quarter-finals)
2. (Japan) Tomokazu Harimoto (semi-finals)
3. (Sweden) Truls Möregårdh (champion)
4. (Chinese Taipei) Lin Yun-ju (first round)
5. (Brazil) Hugo Calderano (final)
6. (France) Alexis Lebrun (quarter-finals)
7. (Germany) Dang Qiu (first round)
8. (Slovenia) Darko Jorgić (quarter-finals)

=== Finals ===
Semi-finals
5	(Brazil) Hugo Calderano	11	11	11	11
(Sweden) Anton Källberg	5	7	8	7
3	(Sweden) Truls Möregårdh	11	11	6	12	11	9	16
2	(Japan) Tomokazu Harimoto	13	6	11	10	8	11	14

Final
5	(Brazil) Hugo Calderano	7	9	11	8	9
3	(Sweden) Truls Möregårdh	11	11	3	11	11

=== Top half ===
==== Section 1 ====
First round
1	(Japan) S Matsushima	11	12	11
(England) T Jarvis	4	10	7
(Japan) Y Uda	11	7	12	10	6
(Hong Kong) Wong C T	7	11	10	12	11
(Croatia) T Pucar	11	11	5	11
(Belgium) A Rassenfosse	5	4	11	8
(Australia) N Lum	4	9	6
5	(Brazil) H Calderano	11	11	11

Second round
1	(Japan) S Matsushima	11	7	11	14
(Hong Kong) Wong C T	8	11	6	12
(Croatia) T Pucar	11	7	6	3
5	(Brazil) H Calderano	6	11	11	11

Quarter-finals
1	(Japan) S Matsushima	9	12	5	12	11	9
5	(Brazil) H Calderano	11	10	11	14	3	11

==== Section 2 ====
First round
4	(Chinese Taipei) Lin Y-j	11	9	11	7	6
(France) F Coton	5	11	9	11	11
(Sweden) A Källberg	12	11	11
(India) M Shah	10	5	6
(Chinese Taipei) Kuo G-h	5	9	7
(Germany) B Duda	11	11	11
(India) M Thakkar	12	4	11	3
6	(France) A Lebrun	14	11	9	11

Second round
(France) F Coton	5	4	7
(Sweden) A Källberg	11	11	11
(Germany) B Duda	6	11	9	11	9
6	(France) A Lebrun	11	9	11	8	11

Quarter-finals
(Sweden) A Källberg	11	3	5	8	11	12	11
6	(France) A Lebrun	6	11	11	11	5	10	5

=== Bottom half ===
==== Section 3 ====
First round
8	(Slovenia) D Jorgić	11	11	11
(Chinese Taipei) Feng Y-h	7	6	7
(Egypt) O Assar	9	7	9
(China) Chen YY	11	11	11
(France) S Gauzy	9	9	11	12
(Japan) S Togami	11	11	9	14
(Germany) P Franziska	11	11	5	9	9
3	(Sweden) T Möregårdh	5	8	11	11	11

Second round
8	(Slovenia) D Jorgić	11	9	8	11	11
(China) Chen YY	4	11	11	8	8
(Japan) S Togami	6	10	13	5
3	(Sweden) T Möregårdh	11	12	11	11

Quarter-finals
8	(Slovenia) D Jorgić	17	3	6	12	3	10
3	(Sweden) T Möregårdh	15	11	11	10	11	12

==== Section 4 ====
First round
7	(Germany) D Qiu	9	12	11	9	5
(China) Zhou QH	11	10	6	11	11
(United States) K Jha	11	11	7	9	11
WC	(China) Huang YZ	7	9	11	11	6
(Portugal) J Geraldo	5	9	9
(Denmark) A Lind	11	11	11
WC	(Macau) Mak T I	2	2	2
2	(Japan) T Harimoto	11	11	11

Second round
(China) Zhou QH	12	8	11	11
(United States) K Jha	10	11	6	8
(Denmark) A Lind	3	6	6
2	(Japan) T Harimoto	11	11	11

Quarter-finals
(China) Zhou QH	5	4	8	11	8
2	(Japan) T Harimoto	11	11	11	6	11

== Women's singles ==
=== Seeds ===
1. (Japan) Miwa Harimoto (champion)
2. (China) Kuai Man (first round)
3. (China) Wang Yidi (first round)
4. (Japan) Hina Hayata (semi-finals)
5. (China) Chen Xingtong (semi-finals)
6. (Germany) Sabine Winter (first round)
7. (Japan) Satsuki Odo (quarter-finals)
8. (China) Chen Yi (final)

=== Finals ===
Semi-finals
1	(Japan) Miwa Harimoto	11	12	6	11	12
5	(China) Chen Xingtong	8	10	11	9	10
4	(Japan) Hina Hayata	4	6	11	8	11	18	4
8	(China) Chen Yi	11	11	8	11	8	16	11

Final
1	(Japan) Miwa Harimoto	11	11	9	8	11	11	12
8	(China) Chen Yi	7	7	11	11	13	9	10

=== Top half ===
==== Section 1 ====
First round
1	(Japan) M Harimoto	11	12	11
(Singapore) Zeng J	8	10	3
(Wales) A Hursey	11	11	11
WC	(Macau) Leong O N	1	7	6
(France) J N Yuan	10	9	12	10
(Austria) S Polcanova	12	11	10	12
(Romania) B Szőcs	11	11	11	11
6	(Germany) S Winter	9	9	13	1

Second round
1	(Japan) M Harimoto	11	11	11
(Wales) A Hursey	2	4	4
(Austria) S Polcanova	3	7	12	11	8
(Romania) B Szőcs	11	11	10	8	11

Quarter-finals
1	(Japan) M Harimoto	11	11	8	11	11
(Romania) B Szőcs	8	4	11	8	5

==== Section 2 ====
First round
3	(China) Wang YD	7	7	11	7
(Egypt) D Meshref	11	11	9	11
(Canada) M Zhang	11	8	9	11	11
(United States) L Zhang	8	11	11	9	13
(Egypt) H Goda	10	11	11	11
(Brazil) B Takahashi	12	6	4	9
(Germany) N Mittelham	5	6	3
5	(China) Chen XT	11	11	11

Second round
(Egypt) D Meshref	11	11	17
(United States) L Zhang	8	3	15
(Egypt) H Goda	11	8	6	11	9
5	(China) Chen XT	3	11	11	9	11

Quarter-finals
(Egypt) D Meshref	6	13	4	8
5	(China) Chen XT	11	15	11	11

=== Bottom half ===
==== Section 3 ====
First round
7	(Japan) S Odo	10	3	11	11	11
(Romania) E Samara	12	11	3	5	3
(Chinese Taipei) Cheng I-c	11	11	11
(Hong Kong) Doo H K	5	5	3
(Puerto Rico) A Díaz	3	11	5	11	6
(Japan) H Hashimoto	11	7	11	9	11
(Ukraine) M Pesotska	4	4	9
4	(Japan) H Hayata	11	11	11

Second round
7	(Japan) S Odo	11	10	16	8	11
(Chinese Taipei) Cheng I-c	9	12	14	11	9
(Japan) H Hashimoto	8	11	7	11	2
4	(Japan) H Hayata	11	7	11	3	11

Quarter-finals
7	(Japan) S Odo	8	8	15	13	8
4	(Japan) H Hayata	11	11	17	11	11

==== Section 4 ====
First round
8	(China) Chen Y	11	11	11
(Chinese Taipei) Yeh Y-t	6	8	8
(Australia) Y Liu	11	8	11	8	8
(Russia) E Abraamian	9	11	7	11	11
(France) P Pavade	7	9	11	7
WC	(Poland) N Bajor	11	11	3	11
(Germany) Y Han	6	11	11	10	11
2	(China) Kuai M	11	8	3	12	6

Second round
8	(China) Chen Y	11	8	13	12
(Russia) E Abraamian	9	11	11	10
WC	(Poland) N Bajor	14	2	11	9	5
(Germany) Y Han	12	11	5	11	11

Quarter-finals
8	(China) Chen Y	11	11	11	11
(Germany) Y Han	8	9	6	8

Preceded by WTT Contender Almaty 2026	2026 WTT Series	Succeeded by WTT Star Contender Astana 2026
