= 2025 European Table Tennis Championships =

- Date: 12–19 October 2025
- Location: Zadar, Croatia
- Venue: Dvorana Krešimira Ćosića
- European Table Tennis Championships

The 2025 European Table Tennis Championships were held in Zadar, Croatia from 12 to 19 October 2025. The venue for the competition was the Dvorana Krešimira Ćosića. The competition featured team events for men and women.

== Medal summary ==
=== Medalists ===
| Event | Gold | Silver | Bronze |
|---|---|---|---|
| Men's team | France; Félix Lebrun; Alexis Lebrun; Simon Gauzy; Thibault Poret; Flavien Coton | Romania; Eduard Ionescu; Iulian Chirita; Ovidiu Ionescu; Darius Movileanu; Andrei Istrate | Germany; Benedikt Duda; Patrick Franziska; Dang Qiu; André Bertelsmeier; Ricardo Walther |
| Men's team | France; Félix Lebrun; Alexis Lebrun; Simon Gauzy; Thibault Poret; Flavien Coton | Romania; Eduard Ionescu; Iulian Chirita; Ovidiu Ionescu; Darius Movileanu; Andrei Istrate | Slovenia; Darko Jorgić; Deni Kožul; Brin Vovk Petrovski; Peter Hribar; Bojan Tokić |
| Women's team | Germany; Sabine Winter; Mia Griesel; Nina Mittelham; Wan Yuan; Annett Kaufmann | Romania; Bernadette Szőcs; Elizabeta Samara; Andreea Dragoman; Adina Diaconu; Elena Zaharia | Netherlands; Britt Eerland; Men Shuohan; Li Jie; Tanja Helle |
| Women's team | Germany; Sabine Winter; Mia Griesel; Nina Mittelham; Wan Yuan; Annett Kaufmann | Romania; Bernadette Szőcs; Elizabeta Samara; Andreea Dragoman; Adina Diaconu; Elena Zaharia | Portugal; Shao Jieni; Yu Fu; Matilde Pinto; Júlia Leal |

== Medal table ==
* Host nation (Croatia)

| Rank | nation | Gold | Silver | Bronze | Total |
|---|---|---|---|---|---|
| 1 | Germany (GER) | 1 | 0 | 1 | 2 |
| 2 | France (FRA) | 1 | 0 | 0 | 1 |
| 3 | Romania (ROU) | 0 | 2 | 0 | 2 |
| 4 | Netherlands (NED) | 0 | 0 | 1 | 1 |
| 4 | Portugal (POR) | 0 | 0 | 1 | 1 |
| 4 | Slovenia (SLO) | 0 | 0 | 1 | 1 |
| Totals (6 entries) | | 2 | 2 | 4 | 8 |
