= 2022 World Team Table Tennis Championships =

2022 edition of the World Team Table Tennis Championships

- Venue: High Technology Zone Sports Center Gymnasium
- Location: Chengdu, China
- Dates: 30 September – 9 October
- Nations: 36 (32 men's teams, 28 women's teams)

Champions
- Men: China
- Women: China

The 2022 World Team Table Tennis Championships were held in Chengdu, China from 30 September to 9 October 2022. The World Team Championships were originally scheduled in April and pushed back to September due to the COVID-19 pandemic.

== Format ==
The teams were drawn in groups of five teams in principle. After a round robin in each group, the top two teams in groups and the highest-ranked (world team ranking) third-placed teams qualified for a 16-team knockout stage. Two losing semi-finalists received bronze medals in the absence of a third-place match.

=== Team match system ===
A team consisted of three members playing best of five singles. Each singles match was a best of five games. The order of play was:

1. A vs X
2. B vs Y
3. C vs Z
4. A vs Y
5. B vs X

=== Tie-breaking criteria for group play ===
A finished team match brought two points for a win, one point for a loss. No points were given for a loss in an unplayed or unfinished match. The ranking of teams in the group stage were determined as follows:

1. Points obtained in all group matches;
2. Points obtained in the matches played between the teams in question;
3. Ratios of wins to losses in the singles matches played between the teams in question;
4. Ratios of wins to losses in the games played between the teams in question;
5. Ratios of wins to losses in the points played between the teams in question;
6. Drawing of lots.

== Qualification ==
Qualified teams were announced in June 2022. Number of teams eligible to compete for the trophy in each team event is expanded to 40, compared to the previous 24 teams in 2018. However, only 32 men's teams and 28 women's teams arrived in Chengdu with differences from the original list.

Qualification	Men's team	Women's team
Host	China	China
Africa (5); 2021 African Championships	Egypt; Nigeria (absence); Algeria (absence); Togo (absence); Tunisia (absence)	Egypt; Nigeria (absence); Tunisia (absence); Mauritius (absence); Algeria (absence) addition: South Africa
Americas (7); 2021 Pan American Table Tennis Championships	Brazil; Chile (absence); Argentina (absence); United States; Canada; Puerto Rico; Peru (absence)	Brazil; Canada; United States; Chile (absence); Puerto Rico; Argentina (absence); Guatemala (absence)
Asia (11); 2021 Asian Championships	South Korea; Chinese Taipei; India; Japan; Iran; Singapore; Hong Kong; Kazakhstan; Saudi Arabia; Thailand; Uzbekistan	Japan; South Korea; Hong Kong; Singapore; India; Thailand; Chinese Taipei; Kazakhstan (absence); Iran; Uzbekistan; Indonesia (absence) addition: Malaysia
Europe (12); 2021 European Championships (8) and world team ranking (4)	Germany; Russia (suspension); Sweden; Denmark; England; Austria (absence); Czech Republic; Romania; Portugal; France; Croatia; Slovenia addition: Hungary; Poland; Slovakia	Germany; Romania; France; Portugal; Austria (absence); Ukraine (absence); Poland; Luxembourg; Hungary; Russia (suspension); Netherlands (absence); Sweden addition: Czech Republic; Italy; Slovakia
Oceania (3) world team ranking	Australia; New Zealand (absence); Vanuatu (absence)	Australia (absence); Vanuatu (absence); Fiji (absence)
Intercontinental quota (1) world team ranking	Belgium	North Korea (absence)

== Schedule ==
The draw took place on 28 September. Group phase commences on 30 September and knockout stage starts on 5 October, with the women's and men's finals taking place on 8 and 9 October respectively.

Event↓/Date →	Fri 30	Sat 1	Sun 2	Mon 3	Tue 4	Wed 5	Thu 6	Fri 7	Sat 8	Sun 9
Men's team	Group					1/8 F		QF	SF	F
Women's team	Group					1/8 F	QF	SF	F	

== Medal summary ==
=== Medal table ===
* Host nation (China)

Rank	Nation	Gold	Silver	Bronze	Total
1	China*	2	0	0	2
2	Germany	0	1	1	2
2	Japan	0	1	1	2
4	Chinese Taipei	0	0	1	1
4	South Korea	0	0	1	1
Totals (5 entries)		2	2	4	8

=== Medalists ===
Event	Gold	Silver	Bronze
Men's team	China; Fan Zhendong; Ma Long; Liang Jingkun; Wang Chuqin; Lin Gaoyuan	Germany; Dang Qiu; Benedikt Duda; Ricardo Walther; Fanbo Meng; Kay Stumper	Japan; Tomokazu Harimoto; Shunsuke Togami; Mizuki Oikawa; Jo Yokotani
Men's team	China; Fan Zhendong; Ma Long; Liang Jingkun; Wang Chuqin; Lin Gaoyuan	Germany; Dang Qiu; Benedikt Duda; Ricardo Walther; Fanbo Meng; Kay Stumper	South Korea; Jang Woo-jin; An Jae-hyun; Cho Seung-min; Cho Dae-seong; Hwang Min-ha
Women's team	China; Sun Yingsha; Chen Meng; Wang Manyu; Wang Yidi; Chen Xingtong	Japan; Hina Hayata; Mima Ito; Miyuu Kihara; Miyu Nagasaki; Hitomi Sato	Chinese Taipei; Chen Szu-yu; Cheng I-ching; Liu Hsing-yin; Li Yu-jhun; Huang Yi-hua
Women's team	China; Sun Yingsha; Chen Meng; Wang Manyu; Wang Yidi; Chen Xingtong	Japan; Hina Hayata; Mima Ito; Miyuu Kihara; Miyu Nagasaki; Hitomi Sato	Germany; Han Ying; Nina Mittelham; Shan Xiaona; Sabine Winter; Annett Kaufmann
