= Ricardo Walther =

German table tennis player

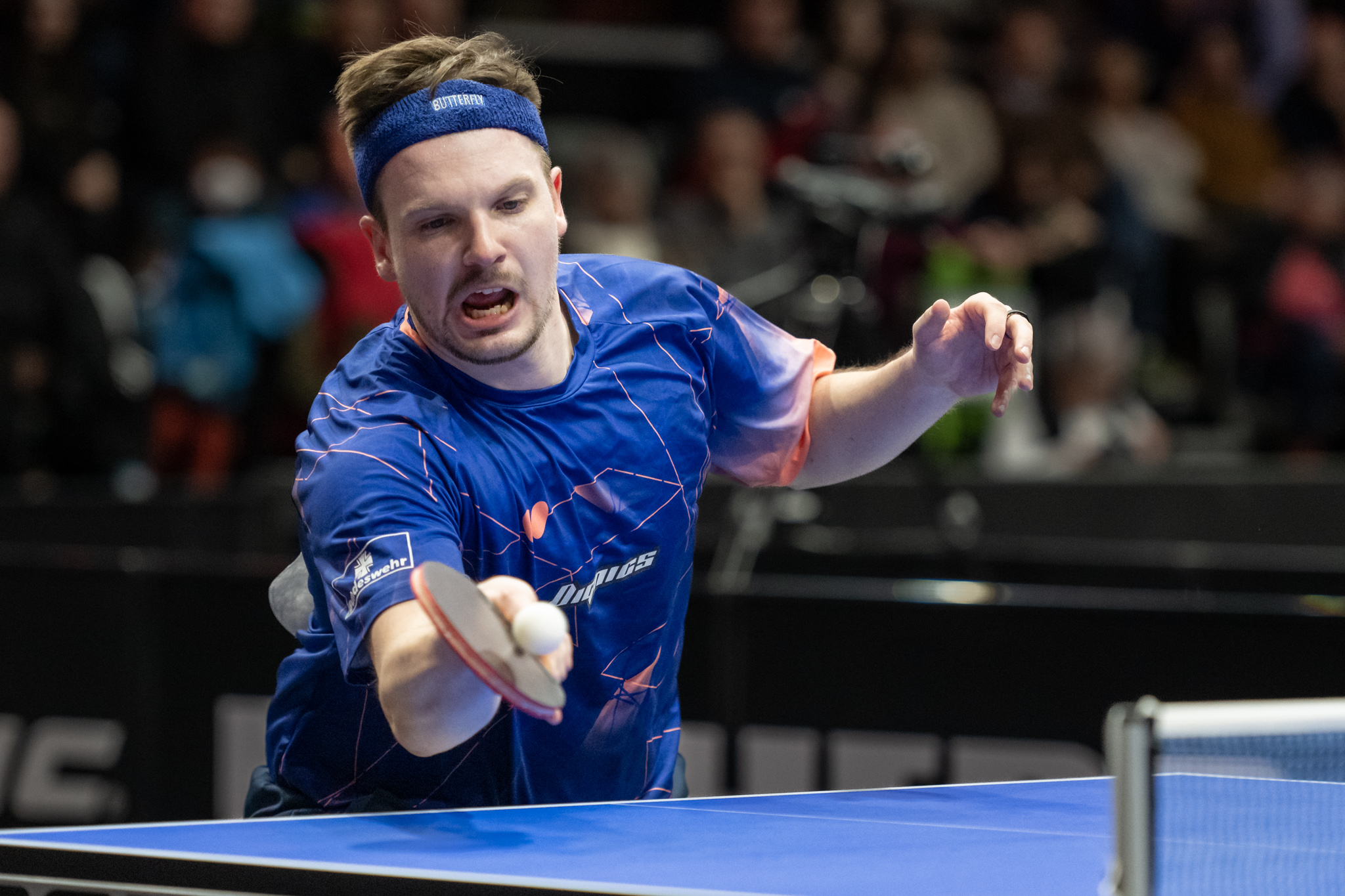
- Walther in 2023

Personal information
- Nationality: German
- Born: 30 November 1991 (age 34) Brühl, Germany
- Height: 185 cm (6 ft 1 in)
- Weight: 83 kg (183 lb)

Sport
- Sport: Table tennis
- Club: ASV Grünwettersbach; Ahmedabad SG Pipers
- Playing style: Right-handed, shakehand grip
- Highest ranking: 27 (January 2018)
- Current ranking: 49 (15 July 2025)
Medal record
Men's table tennis
Representing Germany
World Championships
Silver medal – second place	2022 Chengdu	Team
European Championships
Gold medal – first place	2017 Luksemburg City	Team
Silver medal – second place	2015 Yekaterinburg	Team
Silver medal – second place	2023 Malmö	Team
Bronze medal – third place	2018 Alicante	Doubles
Bronze medal – third place	2025 Zadar	Team
World Youth Championships
Silver medal – second place	2009 Cartagena	Boys' Team

Ricardo Walther (born 30 November 1991) is a German table tennis player who plays for ASV Grünwettersbach in Tischtennis-Bundesliga and Ahmedabad SG Pipers in Ultimate Table Tennis

== Career ==
Ricardo Walther began his career at TTC Blau-Weiß Brühl-Vochem. In 2009 Walther won bronze medal at the World Junior Table Tennis Championships.

He was part of the German national table tennis team that won the silver medal at the 2022 World Team Table Tennis Championships in Chengdu.

In the European scene, he managed to secure one gold medal and two silver medals in the team category, and one bronze medal in the men's doubles category.
