= Dang Qiu =

German table tennis player

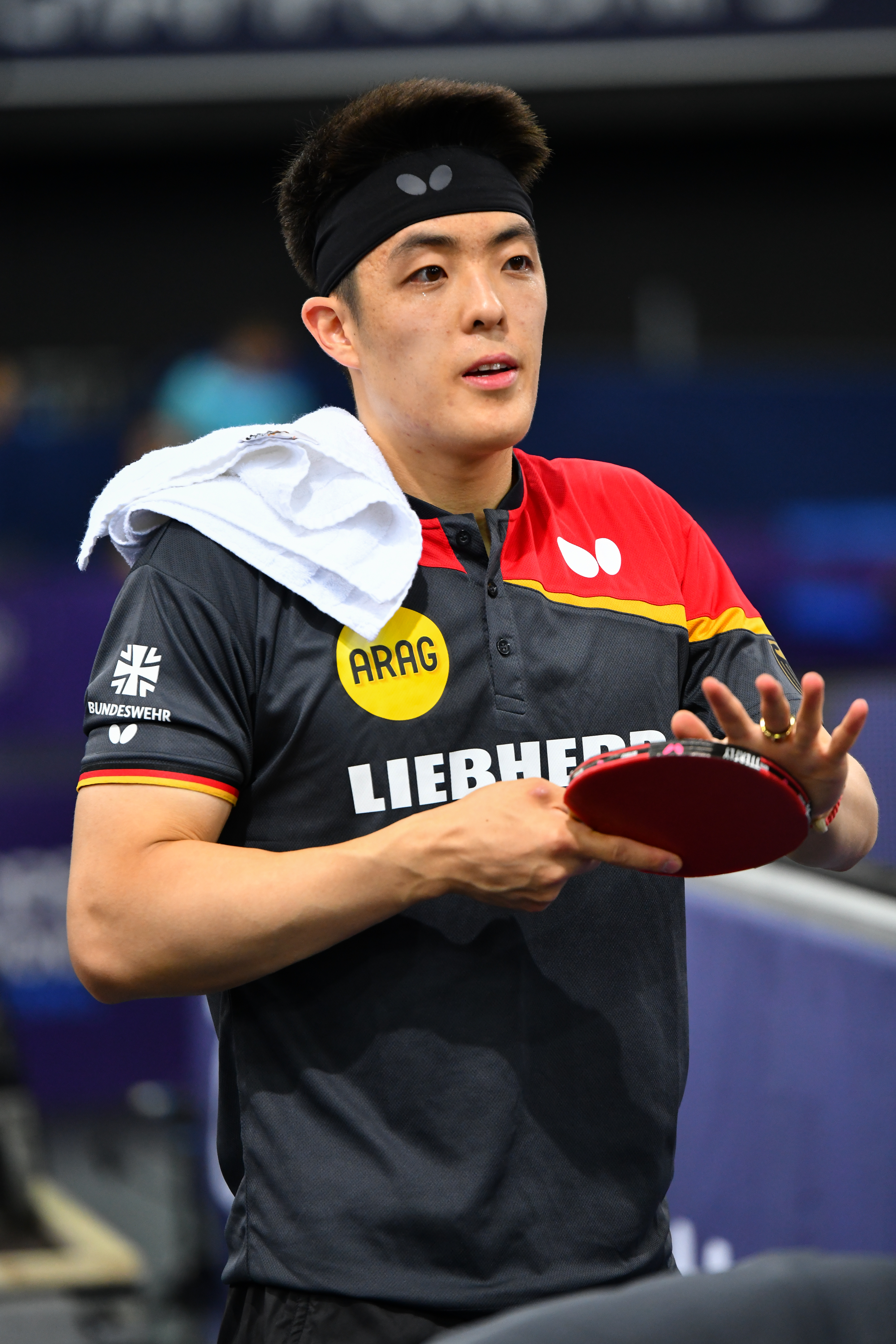
- Qiu at the 2022 European Championships

Personal information
- Nationality: German
- Born: 29 October 1996 (age 29) Nürtingen, Germany
- Height: 180 cm (5 ft 11 in)
- Weight: 72 kg (159 lb)

Sport
- Sport: Table tennis
- Club: Borussia Düsseldorf (Bundesliga)
- Playing style: Righthanded penholder
- Highest ranking: 8 (4 April 2023)
- Current ranking: 11 (12 October 2026)
Medal record
Men's table tennis
Representing Germany
World Championships
Silver medal – second place	2022 Chengdu	Team
World Cup
Bronze medal – third place	2025 Chengdu	Mixed team
European Games
Gold medal – first place	2023 Kraków–Małopolska	Mixed doubles
Gold medal – first place	2023 Kraków–Małopolska	Team
European Championships
Gold medal – first place	2020 Warsaw	Mixed doubles
Gold medal – first place	2021 Cluj-Napoca	Team
Gold medal – first place	2022 Munich	Singles
Bronze medal – third place	2025 Zadar	Team
Bronze medal – third place	2026 Ljubljana	Singles
Europe Top-16
Silver medal – second place	2023 Montreux	Singles

Dang Qiu (Chinese: 邱党; pinyin: Qiū Dǎng; born 29 October 1996) is a German professional table tennis player. He is the first German-born national player playing the penhold grip style, in particular the modern two-sided penhold grip which allows him to play the reverse penhold backhand. In 2022 and at his first participation of a European Table Tennis Championships, he won the men's single title on first attempt.

== Career ==
In June 2022, Qiu defeated Dimitrij Ovtcharov in seven games at the WTT Contender in Lima. The victory helped him reach world No. 10 in the ITTF world ranking. In August 2022, Qiu defeated Darko Jorgic 4–1 in the European Table Tennis Championships Finals. As the top-ranked player in German team, Qiu help the team advance to the final of 2022 World Team Championships later in October and winning the silver medal. On national level, he won the men's singles titles of the German National Table Tennis Championships in 2022 and 2023.

At the European Games 2023 in Kraków, he won the men's teams and mixed doubles titles (with Nina Mittelham), the latter qualified him for the mixed doubles competition at the 2024 Summer Olympics in Paris. At the Europe Top 16 Cup in Montreux, Qiu won the men's single silver medal, this time losing to Darko Jorgic in the finals. He reached the men's singles semi-finals at the WTT Contender Lima 2023 and WTT Champions Chongqing 2024.

== Personal life ==
Qiu was born in Nürtingen, Germany in a family of Chinese descent. He comes from a family of table tennis enthusiasts. His parents were table tennis players trained in Jiangsu, China and moved to Germany in the 1990s. Dang's father, named Jianxin Qiu (Chinese: 邱建新; pinyin: Qiū Jiàn Xīn) started to coach in Japan in 1997. Dang's older brother, named Liang Qiu (Chinese: 邱梁; pinyin: Qiū Liáng) is also a table tennis player in Germany.

== Singles titles ==
Year	Tournament	Final opponent	Score	Ref
2020	ITTF Challenge Plus, Portugal Open	(Ukraine) Yevhen Pryshchepa	4–3	
2022	WTT Contender Lima	(Germany) Dimitrij Ovtcharov	4–3	
2022	European Championships	(Slovenia) Darko Jorgić	4–1	
2025	WTT Star Contender London	(Japan) Tomokazu Harimoto	4–2	
2026	WTT Star Contender Astana	(France) Alexis Lebrun	4–2	
