= Eduard Ionescu =

Romanian table tennis player

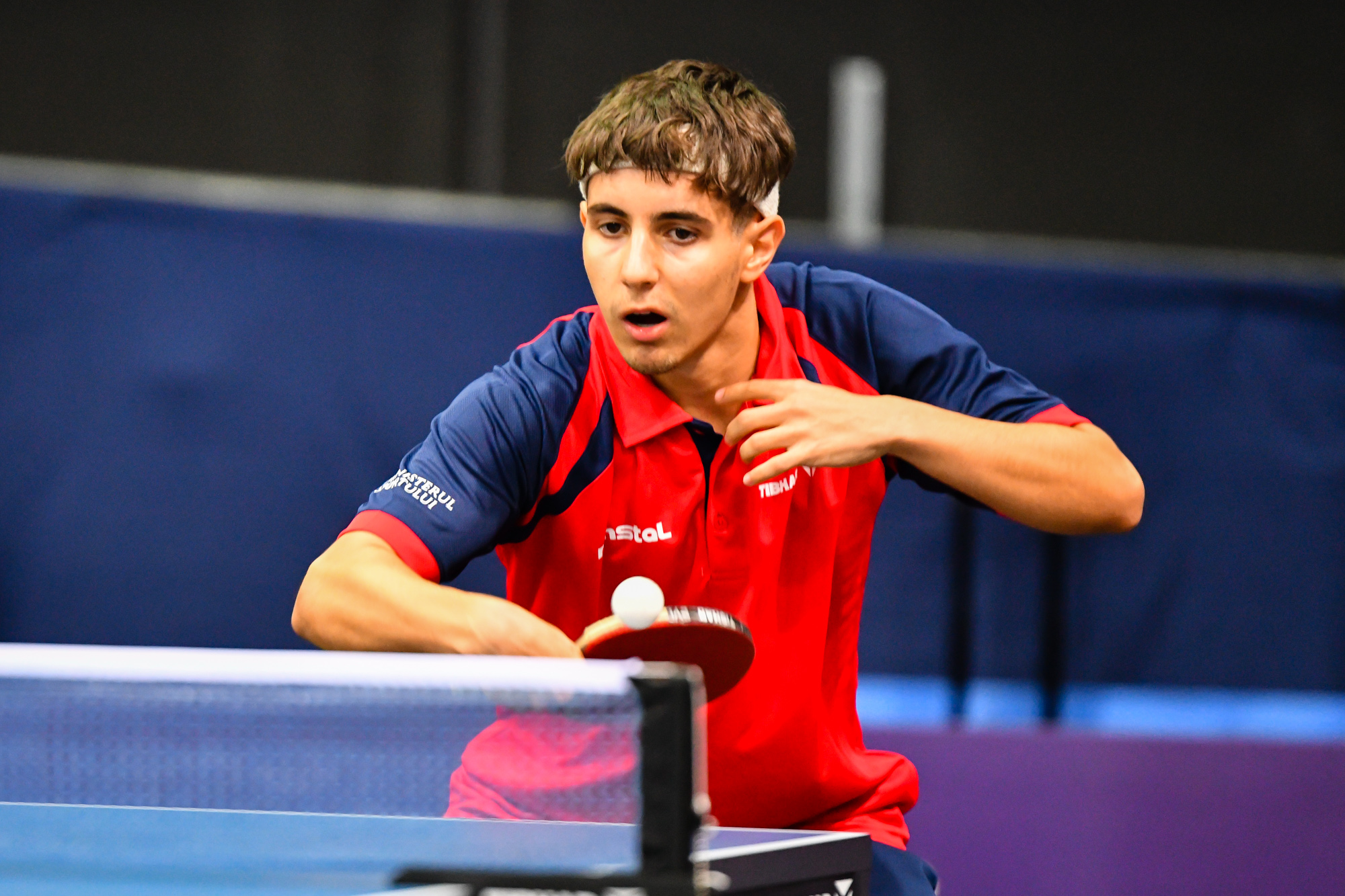

Personal information
- Full name: Andrei Eduard Ionescu
- Born: 9 November 2004 (age 21) Buzău, Romania

Sport
- Sport: Table tennis
- Club: FC Saarbrücken TT
- Playing style: Right-handed shakehand
- Highest ranking: 54 (21 September 2026)
- Current ranking: 70 (5 October 2026)
Medal record
Men's table tennis
Representing Romania
European Championships
Silver medal – second place	2025 Zadar	Team
Bronze medal – third place	2026 Ljubljana	Mixed doubles
Francophone Games
Gold medal – first place	2023 Kinshasa	Singles
Gold medal – first place	2023 Kinshasa	Mixed doubles
Gold medal – first place	2023 Kinshasa	Mixed team
World University Games
Bronze medal – third place	2025 Rhine-Ruhr	Singles
Bronze medal – third place	2025 Rhine-Ruhr	Doubles
European Youth Championships
Gold medal – first place	2022 Belgrade	Singles
Gold medal – first place	2022 Belgrade	Doubles
Gold medal – first place	2023 Gliwice	Singles
Gold medal – first place	2023 Gliwice	Doubles

Andrei Eduard Ionescu is a Romanian table tennis player. He won two gold medals at the 2022 and 2023 European Youth Table Tennis Championships at singles and double categories. He competed in the 2024 Summer Olympics.
