= Benedikt Duda =

German table tennis player (born 1994)

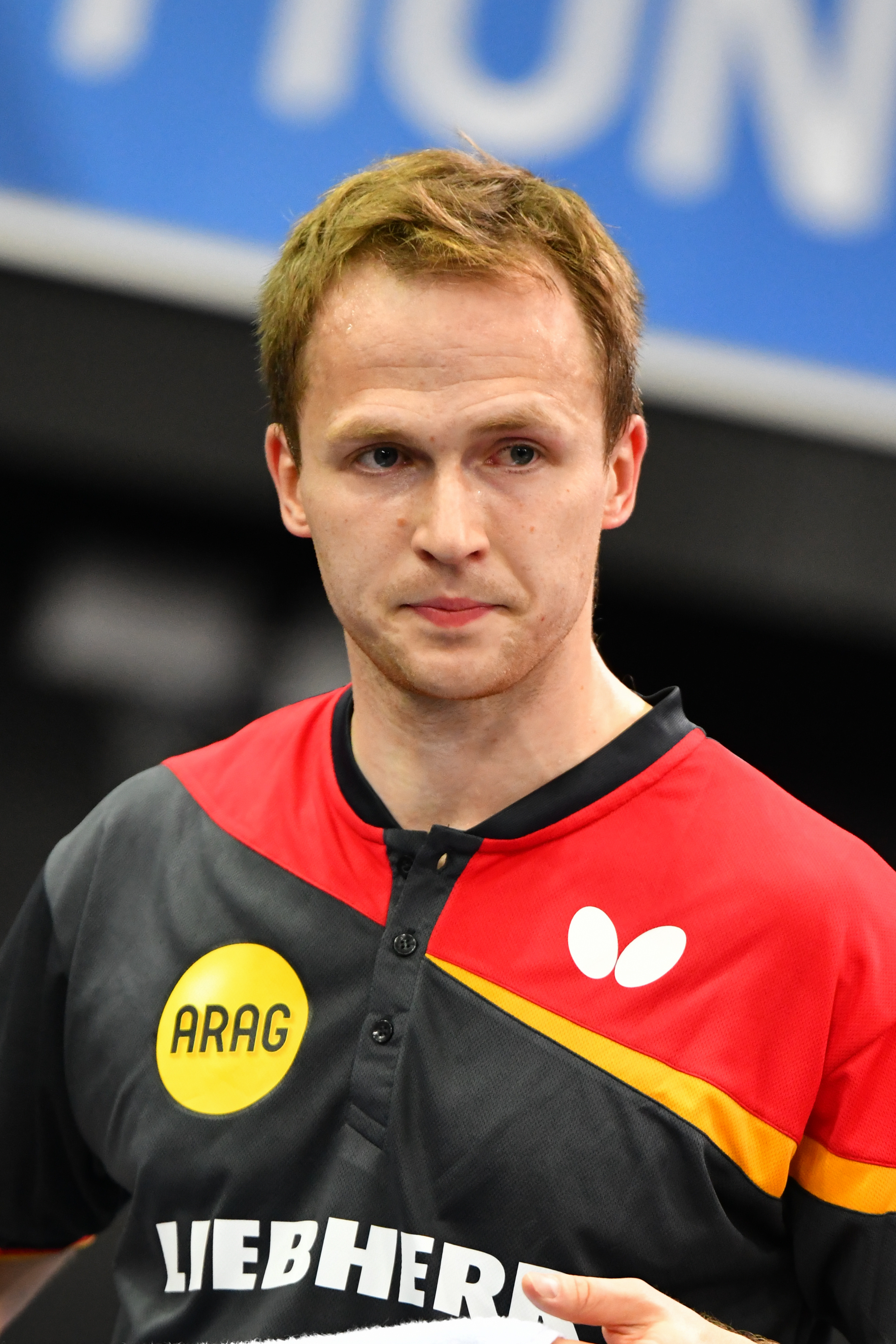

Personal information
- Born: 4 April 1994 (age 32) Gummersbach, Germany
- Height: 188 cm (6 ft 2 in)

Sport
- Sport: Table tennis
- Club: TTC Schwalbe Bergneustadt
- Playing style: left-handed shakehand
- Highest ranking: 8 (26 August 2025)
- Current ranking: 37 (28 September 2026)
Medal record
Men's table tennis
Representing Germany
World Championships
Silver medal – second place	2022 Busan	Team
World Cup
Bronze medal – third place	2025 Chengdu	Mixed team
European Championships
Gold medal – first place	2019 Nantes	Team
Gold medal – first place	2021 Cluj-Napoca	Team
Gold medal – first place	2026 Ljubljana	Mixed doubles
Silver medal – second place	2023 Malmö	Team
Silver medal – second place	2024 Linz	Singles
Bronze medal – third place	2025 Zadar	Team
Europe Top-16
Bronze medal – third place	2026 Montreux	Singles

Benedikt Duda (born 4 April 1994 in Gummersbach) is a German table tennis player.

== Biography ==
Benedikt Duda started playing table tennis at the age of 10. His father was also a former professional table tennis player who played at TTC Schwalbe in Bergneustadt, the town where he grew up.

In 2019 he won the European team championship and two years later he won it again.

At the 2022 World Team Championships, he won a silver medal after losing to China in the final. In 2023, he won a silver medal at the 2023 European Table Tennis Championships after losing the team final to Sweden.

On professional circuit, Duda has won four singles and doubles titles in his career.

== Singles titles ==
Year	Tournament	Final opponent	Score	Ref
2021	WTT Feeder Düsseldorf	(Spain) Álvaro Robles	4–1	
2022	WTT Feeder Biella	(Greece) Panagiotis Gionis	3–2	
2024	WTT Contender Mendoza	(Spain) Álvaro Robles	4–3	
2025	WTT Contender Skopje	(China) Wen Ruibo	4–2	
