= United States Smash 2026 =

Table tennis tournament in United States

Tournament details
- Dates: 26 June – 5 July
- Edition: 2nd
- Total prize money: US$1,550,000
- Venue: Ontario Convention Center
- Location: Ontario, California, United States

Champions
- Men's singles: (Japan) Sora Matsushima
- Women's singles: (China) Sun Yingsha
- Men's doubles: (China) Wen Ruibo (China) Yuan Licen
- Women's doubles: (China) Wang Manyu (China) Kuai Man
- Mixed doubles: (South Korea) Lim Jong-hoon (South Korea) Shin Yu-bin

The United States Smash 2026 was a table tennis tournament that was held at the Ontario Convention Center in Ontario, California, from 26 June to 5 July, offering a total prize of US$1,550,000.

== Tournament ==
The United States Smash 2026 is the thirteenth tournament of the 2026 WTT Series and is part of the Grand Smash event. This tournament marks the second Grand Smash event on this season's calendar, with a total of four Grand Smash tournaments being contested throughout the season.

=== Venue ===
This tournament is held at the Ontario Convention Center in Ontario, California, United States.

=== Point distribution ===
Below is the point distribution table for each phase of the tournament based on the WTT World Ranking for the Grand Smash event.

Event	Winner	Finalist	Semi-finalist	Quarter-finalist	Round of 16	Round of 24 / 32	Round of 64
Singles	2000	1400	900	580	380	100	20
Doubles	2000	1400	900	580	150	10	—

=== Prize pool ===
The total prize money is US$1,550,000 with the distribution of the prize money in accordance with WTT regulations.

Event	Winner	Finalist	Semi-finalist	Quarter-finalist	Round of 16	Round of 24 / 32	Round of 64
Singles	$103,000	$52,000	$26,000	$14,345	$9,300	$6,250	$4,125
Doubles	$10,000	$6,034	$3,600	$2,650	$2,000	$1,500	—

== Qualification ==
=== Men's singles ===
The following players qualified for the main draw:

- (Sweden) Elias Ranefur
- (Hong Kong) Baldwin Chan
- (Hungary) Csaba András
- (Germany) André Bertelsmeier
- (Romania) Iulian Chirita
- (Moldova) Vladislav Ursu
- (Chinese Taipei) Kao Cheng-jui
- (Argentina) Horacio Cifuentes

=== Women's singles ===
The following players qualified for the main draw:

- (France) Audrey Zarif
- (Germany) Xiaona Shan
- (India) Yashaswini Ghorpade
- (Romania) Elena Zaharia
- (Singapore) Tan Zhao Yun
- (Chinese Taipei) Huang Yu-jie
- (Chinese Taipei) Peng Yu-han
- (Portugal) Jieni Shao

== Men's singles ==
=== Seeds ===
1. (China) Wang Chuqin (third round)
2. (Japan) Tomokazu Harimoto (third round)
3. (Sweden) Truls Möregårdh (semi-finals)
4. (France) Félix Lebrun (semi-finals)
5. (China) Lin Shidong (third round)
6. (Japan) Sora Matsushima (champion)
7. (Chinese Taipei) Lin Yun-ju (first round)
8. (Brazil) Hugo Calderano (third round)
9. (Germany) Dang Qiu (third round)
10. (South Korea) Jang Woo-jin (quarter-finals)
11. (France) Alexis Lebrun (quarter-finals)
12. (China) Wen Ruibo (second round)
13. (Slovenia) Darko Jorgić (second round)
14. (Japan) Shunsuke Togami (first round)
15. (Denmark) Anders Lind (quarter-finals)
16. (Germany) Benedikt Duda (second round)

=== Finals ===
Quarter-finals
15	(Denmark) Anders Lind	5	7	5	8
6	(Japan) Sora Matsushima	11	11	11	11
4	(France) Félix Lebrun	9	6	11	11	11	11
11	(France) Alexis Lebrun	11	11	7	6	9	8
10	(South Korea) Jang Woo-jin	4	6	5	5
3	(Sweden) Truls Möregårdh	11	11	11	11
(Japan) Hiroto Shinozuka	9	9	11	9	8
(Individual Neutral Athletes) Vladimir Sidorenko	11	11	8	11	11

Semi-finals
6	(Japan) Sora Matsushima	12	11	10	12	12
4	(France) Félix Lebrun	10	7	12	10	10
3	(Sweden) Truls Möregårdh	11	8	11	11	9	4	10
(Individual Neutral Athletes) Vladimir Sidorenko	4	11	5	3	11	11	12

Final
6	(Japan) Sora Matsushima	11	11	11	11	5	11
(Individual Neutral Athletes) Vladimir Sidorenko	5	13	7	4	11	7

=== Top half ===
==== Section 1 ====
First round
1	(China) Wang CQ	11	15	11
(China) Zhou QH	6	13	3
(India) M Thakkar	12	10	11	7	11
(France) F Coton	10	12	7	11	7
(Belgium) A Rassenfosse	11	7	11	11
Q	(Sweden) E Ranefur	8	11	3	9
(Australia) N Lum	6	6	11	5
15	(Denmark) A Lind	11	11	9	11
9	(Germany) D Qiu	11	11	11
Q	(Hungary) C András	3	8	2
(France) J Seyfried	11	5	7	5
(Germany) D Ovtcharov	9	11	11	11
(Egypt) O Assar	15	9	12	11
(Australia) F Luu	13	11	10	8
(Kazakhstan) K Gerassimenko	9	6	5
6	(Japan) S Matsushima	11	11	11

Second round
1	(China) Wang CQ	11	11	11
(India) M Thakkar	3	5	9
(Belgium) A Rassenfosse	11	7	9	9
15	(Denmark) A Lind	9	11	11	11
9	(Germany) D Qiu	7	11	14	11
(Germany) D Ovtcharov	11	8	12	9
(Egypt) O Assar	2	8	4
6	(Japan) S Matsushima	11	11	11

Third round
1	(China) Wang CQ	11	2	11	7
15	(Denmark) A Lind	13	11	8	11
9	(Germany) D Qiu	13	9	9
6	(Japan) S Matsushima	15	11	11

Quarter-finals
15	(Denmark) A Lind	5	7	5	8
6	(Japan) S Matsushima	11	11	11	11

==== Section 2 ====
First round
4	(France) F Lebrun	11	12	11
Q	(Chinese Taipei) Kao C-j	9	10	6
(Hong Kong) Wong C T	5	12	12	8	11
(Denmark) J Groth	11	10	10	11	6
(Portugal) J Geraldo	9	11	10	11	12
Q	(Romania) I Chirita	11	9	12	4	10
WC	(United States) D Tran	6	7	8
13	(Slovenia) D Jorgić	11	11	11
11	(France) A Lebrun	11	11	13
(Sweden) A Källberg	4	9	11
(Poland) M Redzimski	11	6	4	9
(France) S Gauzy	9	11	11	11
(Japan) Y Tanaka	11	11	12
(India) S Gnanasekaran	5	7	10
(South Korea) Park G-h	5	2	6
5	(China) Lin SD	11	11	11

Second round
4	(France) F Lebrun	11	11	11	12
(Hong Kong) Wong C T	7	13	9	10
(Portugal) J Geraldo	12	11	6	11
13	(Slovenia) D Jorgić	10	9	11	8
11	(France) A Lebrun	6	11	11	3	12
(France) S Gauzy	11	5	5	11	10
(Japan) Y Tanaka	9	8	5
5	(China) Lin SD	11	11	11

Third round
4	(France) F Lebrun	11	11	11
(Portugal) J Geraldo	7	8	8
11	(France) A Lebrun	11	11	11
5	(China) Lin SD	9	9	8

Quarter-finals
4	(France) F Lebrun	9	6	11	11	11	11
11	(France) A Lebrun	11	11	7	6	9	8

=== Bottom half ===
==== Section 3 ====
First round
7	(Chinese Taipei) Lin Y-j	9	8	11	11	4
(Chinese Taipei) Kuo G-h	11	11	2	8	11
(Japan) Y Uda	7	11	6	11	11
Q	(Moldova) V Ursu	11	9	11	6	7
(Croatia) T Pucar	11	10	11	6
(Germany) P Franziska	4	12	13	11
Q	(Hong Kong) B Chan	7	3	7
10	(South Korea) Jang W-j	11	11	11
14	(Japan) S Togami	6	10	11	11	10
(United States) K Jha	11	12	4	7	12
(England) T Jarvis	11	11	7	8	11
(South Korea) Oh J-s	8	2	11	11	5
(South Korea) An J-h	11	8	8	9
Q	(Germany) A Bertelsmeier	7	11	11	11
WC	(Nigeria) Q Aruna	12	6	5
3	(Sweden) T Möregårdh	14	11	11

Second round
(Chinese Taipei) Kuo G-h	11	10	8	7
(Japan) Y Uda	4	12	11	11
(Germany) P Franziska	3	7	11	11	12
10	(South Korea) Jang W-j	11	11	8	9	14
(United States) K Jha	11	11	6	11
(England) T Jarvis	2	3	11	4
Q	(Germany) A Bertelsmeier	12	11	11	6	10
3	(Sweden) T Möregårdh	10	13	5	11	12

Third round
(Japan) Y Uda	11	8	6	8
10	(South Korea) Jang W-j	9	11	11	11
(United States) K Jha	3	11	5	9
3	(Sweden) T Möregårdh	11	6	11	11

Quarter-finals
10	(South Korea) Jang W-j	4	6	5	5
3	(Sweden) T Möregårdh	11	11	11	11

==== Section 4 ====
First round
8	(Brazil) H Calderano	11	11	7	11
WC	(Japan) M Yoshimura	4	8	11	9
WC	(United States) N Naresh	6	8	11	4
(China) Chen YY	11	11	8	11
(Japan) H Shinozuka	11	5	13	11
WC	(England) L Pitchford	6	11	11	9
(Czech Republic) L Jančařík	9	4	11
12	(China) Wen RB	11	11	13
16	(Germany) B Duda	11	11	11
(France) T Poret	7	6	3
(Individual Neutral Athletes) V Sidorenko	11	11	11
Q	(Argentina) H Cifuentes	6	5	4
(Romania) E Ionescu	11	7	6	14	8
WC	(France) L Bardet	7	11	11	12	11
WC	(United States) J Liang	1	10	4
2	(Japan) T Harimoto	11	12	11

Second round
8	(Brazil) H Calderano	11	11	11
(China) Chen YY	5	5	2
(Japan) H Shinozuka	11	7	11	4	11
12	(China) Wen RB	8	11	8	11	4
16	(Germany) B Duda	8	9	5
(Individual Neutral Athletes) V Sidorenko	11	11	11
WC	(France) L Bardet	10	7	11
2	(Japan) T Harimoto	12	11	13

Third round
8	(Brazil) H Calderano	11	9	6	3
(Japan) H Shinozuka	4	11	11	11
(Individual Neutral Athletes) V Sidorenko	11	13	11
2	(Japan) T Harimoto	8	11	8

Quarter-finals
(Japan) H Shinozuka	9	9	11	9	8
(Individual Neutral Athletes) V Sidorenko	11	11	8	11	11

== Women's singles ==
=== Seeds ===
1. (China) Sun Yingsha (champion)
2. (China) Wang Manyu (second round)
3. (Macau) Zhu Yuling (third round)
4. (Japan) Miwa Harimoto (semi-finals)
5. (China) Chen Xingtong (quarter-finals)
6. (China) Chen Yi (first round)
7. (China) Kuai Man (final)
8. (China) Wang Yidi (semi-finals)
9. (Germany) Sabine Winter (first round)
10. (Japan) Hina Hayata (quarter-finals)
11. (South Korea) Shin Yu-bin (third round)
12. (Japan) Satsuki Odo (second round)
13. (Japan) Honoka Hashimoto (third round)
14. (China) Shi Xunyao (second round)
15. (Japan) Mima Ito (third round)
16. (South Korea) Joo Cheon-hui (quarter-finals)

=== Finals ===
Quarter-finals
1	(China) Sun Yingsha	11	11	11	11
5	(China) Chen Xingtong	5	5	6	6
16	(South Korea) Joo Cheon-hui	8	5	7	6
8	(China) Wang Yidi	11	11	11	11
10	(Japan) Hina Hayata	7	7	11	11	6
4	(Japan) Miwa Harimoto	11	11	13	9	11
7	(China) Kuai Man	5	11	9	7	12	11	18
WC	(Japan) Hitomi Sato	11	5	11	11	10	3	16

Semi-finals
1	(China) Sun Yingsha	11	11	11	9	11
8	(China) Wang Yidi	6	9	9	11	3
4	(Japan) Miwa Harimoto	9	12	8	14	11	9	8
7	(China) Kuai Man	11	10	11	12	4	11	11

Final
1	(China) Sun Yingsha	11	11	9	11	7	10	11
7	(China) Kuai Man	9	6	11	5	11	12	4

=== Top half ===
==== Section 1 ====
First round
1	(China) Sun YS	11	11	11
(Australia) Y Liu	9	3	6
(Romania) B Szőcs	7	3	3
(Germany) N Mittelham	11	11	11
Q	(Portugal) J Shao	8	11	8	5
(Egypt) D Meshref	11	9	11	11
(Romania) E Samara	10	11	7	14	9
14	(China) Shi XY	12	8	11	12	11
9	(Germany) S Winter	8	11	10	9
(China) Qin YX	11	6	12	11
(Hong Kong) Doo H K	11	9	11	5	11
(Egypt) H Goda	9	11	5	11	4
(Japan) M Nagasaki	11	9	11	11
Q	(Chinese Taipei) Huang Y-j	6	11	13	13
(South Korea) Yoo Y-r	6	8	4
5	(China) Chen XT	11	11	11

Second round
1	(China) Sun YS	11	11	11
(Germany) N Mittelham	1	4	6
(Egypt) D Meshref	11	4	11	11
14	(China) Shi XY	4	11	9	9
(China) Qin YX	12	11	8	11
(Hong Kong) Doo H K	10	7	11	7
Q	(Chinese Taipei) Huang Y-j	10	3	3
5	(China) Chen XT	12	11	11

Third round
1	(China) Sun YS	11	11	11
(Egypt) D Meshref	8	3	5
(China) Qin YX	2	5	5
5	(China) Chen XT	11	11	11

Quarter-finals
1	(China) Sun YS	11	11	11	11
5	(China) Chen XT	5	5	6	6

==== Section 2 ====
First round
3	(Macau) Zhu YL	11	5	11	11
Q	(India) Y Ghorpade	7	11	3	9
(France) P Pavade	11	11	11	9	11
WC	(United States) S Moyland	9	13	9	11	7
(Croatia) L Rakovac	6	6	11	9
(Brazil) B Takahashi	11	11	5	11
(India) S Akula	10	8	2
16	(South Korea) Joo C-h	12	11	11
12	(Japan) S Odo	11	16	11
(South Korea) Lee E-h	8	14	3
(India) M Batra	11	9	4	8
WC	(Japan) S Yokoi	7	11	11	11
(South Korea) Yang H-e	11	7	11	15
Q	(France) A Zarif	4	11	8	13
(Ukraine) M Pesotska	5	9	8
8	(China) Wang YD	11	11	11

Second round
3	(Macau) Zhu YL	11	11	11
(France) P Pavade	6	8	8
(Brazil) B Takahashi	11	6	6	5
16	(South Korea) Joo C-h	4	11	11	11
12	(Japan) S Odo	11	4	13	11	9
WC	(Japan) S Yokoi	8	11	15	8	11
(South Korea) Yang H-e	7	1	11	4
8	(China) Wang YD	11	11	9	11

Third round
3	(Macau) Zhu YL	4	8	13
16	(South Korea) Joo C-h	11	11	15
WC	(Japan) S Yokoi	13	13	11	6	9
8	(China) Wang YD	15	11	7	11	11

Quarter-finals
16	(South Korea) Joo C-h	8	5	7	6
8	(China) Wang YD	11	11	11	11

=== Bottom half ===
==== Section 3 ====
First round
6	(China) Chen Y	11	11	3	7	7
(Germany) Y Han	5	9	11	11	11
(United States) L Zhang	11	6	11	11
(France) J N Yuan	3	11	7	9
(Singapore) Zeng J	11	6	11	11
(Poland) N Bajor	7	11	8	9
(Chinese Taipei) Yeh Y-t	3	7	8
10	(Japan) H Hayata	11	11	11
15	(Japan) M Ito	11	7	11	11
(United States) A Wang	2	11	7	5
(Romania) A Dragoman	11	8	5	8
Q	(Germany) X Shan	8	11	11	11
Q	(Chinese Taipei) Peng Y-h	11	8	10
(Wales) A Hursey	13	11	12
(Chinese Taipei) Li Y-j	6	4	0
4	(Japan) M Harimoto	11	11	11

Second round
(Germany) Y Han	11	11	11
(United States) L Zhang	3	8	2
(Singapore) Zeng J	4	7	6
10	(Japan) H Hayata	11	11	11
15	(Japan) M Ito	11	11	11
Q	(Germany) X Shan	2	2	8
(Wales) A Hursey	7	8	4
4	(Japan) M Harimoto	11	11	11

Third round
(Germany) Y Han	6	9	7
10	(Japan) H Hayata	11	11	11
15	(Japan) M Ito	7	8	7
4	(Japan) M Harimoto	11	11	11

Quarter-finals
10	(Japan) H Hayata	7	7	11	11	6
4	(Japan) M Harimoto	11	11	13	9	11

==== Section 4 ====
First round
7	(China) Kuai M	11	11	11
Q	(Romania) E Zaharia	3	6	4
Q	(Singapore) Tan Z Y	5	10	8
(Canada) M Zhang	11	12	11
(Spain) M Xiao	7	7	7
(South Korea) Kim N-y	11	11	11
(France) C Lutz	11	8	6
11	(South Korea) Shin Y-b	13	11	11
13	(Japan) H Hashimoto	13	11	11
(Portugal) F Yu	11	7	5
WC	(United States) J Reyes Lai	10	5	6
(Chinese Taipei) Cheng I-c	12	11	11
(Puerto Rico) A Díaz	7	7	5
WC	(Japan) H Sato	11	11	11
WC	(United States) I Yeoh	5	3	4
2	(China) Wang MY	11	11	11

Second round
7	(China) Kuai M	11	2	11	11
(Canada) M Zhang	6	11	7	4
(South Korea) Kim N-y	4	2	6
11	(South Korea) Shin Y-b	11	11	11
13	(Japan) H Hashimoto	13	11	12
(Chinese Taipei) Cheng I-c	11	6	10
WC	(Japan) H Sato	12	11	15
2	(China) Wang MY	10	4	13

Third round
7	(China) Kuai M	11	11	13
11	(South Korea) Shin Y-b	8	8	11
13	(Japan) H Hashimoto	8	6	9
WC	(Japan) H Sato	11	11	11

Quarter-finals
7	(China) Kuai M	5	11	9	7	12	11	18
WC	(Japan) H Sato	11	5	11	11	10	3	16

== Men's doubles ==
=== Seeds ===
1. (China) Lin Shidong / (China) Huang Youzheng (final)
2. (France) Alexis Lebrun / (France) Felix Lebrun (second round)
3. (Hong Kong) Wong Chun Ting / (Hong Kong) Baldwin Chan (second round)
4. (South Korea) Oh Jun-sung / (South Korea) Lim Jong-hoon (quarter-finals)
5. (India) Manav Thakkar / (India) Manush Shah (quarter-finals)
6. (Singapore) Izaac Quek / (Singapore) Koen Pang (quarter-finals)
7. (France) Esteban Dorr / (France) Florian Bourrassaud (second round)
8. (Germany) Benedikt Duda / (Germany) Dang Qiu (semi-finals)

=== Finals ===
Semi-finals
1	(China) Lin Shidong (China) Huang Youzheng	11	11	11
8	(Germany) Benedikt Duda (Germany) Dang Qiu	7	8	6
(Chinese Taipei) Lin Yun-ju (Chinese Taipei) Feng Yi-hsin	10	8	7
(China) Wen Ruibo (China) Yuan Licen	12	11	11

Final
1	(China) Lin Shidong (China) Huang Youzheng	9	11	11	7	9
(China) Wen Ruibo (China) Yuan Licen	11	8	6	11	11

=== Top half ===
==== Section 1 ====
First round						Second round					Quarter-finals
						1	(China) Lin SD (China) Huang YZ	11	11	11
(Slovakia) J Zelinka (Slovakia) Ľ Pištej	7	11	11	9	3		(Romania) E Ionescu (Romania) D Movileanu	4	2	4
(Romania) E Ionescu (Romania) D Movileanu	11	8	8	11	11						1	(China) Lin SD (China) Huang YZ	11	11	4	11
											6	(Singapore) I Quek (Singapore) K Pang	9	7	11	4
							(Belgium) M Allegro (Belgium) A Rassenfosse	5	3	3
						6	(Singapore) I Quek (Singapore) K Pang	11	11	11

==== Section 2 ====
First round
(Brazil) G Teodoro (Brazil) L Iizuka	11	11	9	11
WC	(United States) N Naresh (United States) S Naresh	3	5	11	7
WC	(United States) J Liang (United States) B Botha	4	5	2
(Germany) P Franziska (Germany) D Ovtcharov	11	11	11

Second round
4	(South Korea) Oh J-s (South Korea) Lim J-h	11	11	8	11
(Brazil) G Teodoro (Brazil) L Iizuka	6	8	11	9
(Germany) P Franziska (Germany) D Ovtcharov	13	11	4	7	6
8	(Germany) B Duda (Germany) D Qiu	11	6	11	11	11

Quarter-finals
4	(South Korea) Oh J-s (South Korea) Lim J-h	2	3	8
8	(Germany) B Duda (Germany) D Qiu	11	11	11

=== Bottom half ===
==== Section 3 ====
First round
(Chile) N Burgos (Chile) G Gomez	8	11	11	11
(Australia) N Lum (Australia) F Luu	11	8	7	4
(Chinese Taipei) Lin Y-j (Chinese Taipei) Feng Y-h	11	11	11
(Australia) H Bae (Argentina) H Cifuentes	8	2	7

Second round
7/WC	(France) E Dorr (France) F Bourrassaud	11	8	5	8
(Chile) N Burgos (Chile) G Gomez	8	11	11	11
(Chinese Taipei) Lin Y-j (Chinese Taipei) Feng Y-h	11	9	11	10	11
3	(Hong Kong) Wong C T (Hong Kong) B Chan	9	11	6	12	9

Quarter-finals
(Chile) N Burgos (Chile) G Gomez	11	8	5	1
(Chinese Taipei) Lin Y-j (Chinese Taipei) Feng Y-h	6	11	11	11

==== Section 4 ====
First round
(Japan) S Matsushima (Japan) S Togami	11	7	11	12
(Portugal) M Freitas (Portugal) T Apolónia	7	11	6	10
WC	(United States) K Jha (China) Xue F	9	6	11	9
(China) Wen RB (China) Yuan LC	11	11	8	11

Second round
5	(India) M Thakkar (India) M Shah	8	11	11	11
(Japan) S Matsushima (Japan) S Togami	11	8	8	7
(China) Wen RB (China) Yuan LC	11	11	11
2	(France) A Lebrun (France) F Lebrun	8	4	9

Quarter-finals
5	(India) M Thakkar (India) M Shah	6	5	11	8
(China) Wen RB (China) Yuan LC	11	11	8	11

== Women's doubles ==
=== Seeds ===
1. (China) Wang Manyu / (China) Kuai Man (champions)
2. (Japan) Miwa Harimoto / (Japan) Hina Hayata (final)
3. (Japan) Miyu Nagasaki / (South Korea) Kim Na-yeong (quarter-finals)
4. (South Korea) Shin Yu-bin / (South Korea) Joo Cheon-hui (semi-finals)
5. (China) Wang Yidi / (China) Chen Yi (semi-finals)
6. (Hong Kong) Doo Hoi Kem / (Hong Kong) Ng Wing Lam (second round)
7. (India) Diya Chitale / (India) Yashaswini Ghorpade (quarter-finals)
8. (Chinese Taipei) Chien Tung-chuan / (Chinese Taipei) Li Yu-jhun (quarter-finals)

=== Finals ===
Semi-finals
1	(China) Wang Manyu (China) Kuai Man	11	11	16
5/WC	(China) Wang Yidi (China) Chen Yi	7	6	14
4	(South Korea) Shin Yu-bin (South Korea) Joo Cheon-hui	7	8	14	8
2	(Japan) Miwa Harimoto (Japan) Hina Hayata	11	11	12	11

Final
1	(China) Wang Manyu (China) Kuai Man	13	4	14	11
2	(Japan) Miwa Harimoto (Japan) Hina Hayata	11	11	12	8

=== Top half ===
==== Section 1 ====
First round
(Egypt) D Meshref (Egypt) H Goda	11	11	5	9	8
(Australia) Y Liu (Germany) N Mittelham	6	9	11	11	11
(Wales) A Hursey (Spain) M Xiao	11	12	11
(Mexico) C Barcenas (Mexico) A Cossio	4	10	8

Second round
1	(China) Wang MY (China) Kuai M	14	11	11
(Australia) Y Liu (Germany) N Mittelham	12	6	9
(Wales) A Hursey (Spain) M Xiao	22	11	11
6	(Hong Kong) Doo H K (Hong Kong) Ng W L	20	9	9

Quarter-finals
1	(China) Wang MY (China) Kuai M	11	12	12	11
(Wales) A Hursey (Spain) M Xiao	8	14	10	3

==== Section 2 ====
First round
(Chile) D Ortega (Chile) P Vega	8	14	8	6
(Singapore) Zeng J (Singapore) Ser L Q	11	12	11	11
(Australia) M Jee (India) M Batra	11	11	7	9	5
(Romania) E Samara (Romania) B Szőcs	9	7	11	11	11

Second round
3	(Japan) M Nagasaki (South Korea) Kim N-y	11	11	11
(Singapore) Zeng J (Singapore) Ser L Q	7	5	5
(Romania) E Samara (Romania) B Szőcs	4	11	3	11
5/WC	(China) Wang YD (China) Chen Y	11	8	11	13

Quarter-finals
3	(Japan) M Nagasaki (South Korea) Kim N-y	11	8	9	11	8
5/WC	(China) Wang YD (China) Chen Y	7	11	11	8	11

=== Bottom half ===
==== Section 3 ====
First round
(Germany) X Shan (South Korea) Lee E-h	9	8	11	11	8
(Slovakia) T Kukuľková (Slovakia) B Várady	11	11	7	3	11
(France) P Pavade (France) C Lutz	7	11	4	4
(Serbia) I Lupulesku (Serbia) S Šurjan	11	5	11	11

Second round
8	(Chinese Taipei) Chien T-c (Chinese Taipei) Li Y-j	11	6	11	9	11
(Slovakia) T Kukuľková (Slovakia) B Várady	7	11	4	11	7
(Serbia) I Lupulesku (Serbia) S Šurjan	8	5	12	12
4	(South Korea) Shin Y-b (South Korea) Joo C-h	11	11	10	14

Quarter-finals
8	(Chinese Taipei) Chien T-c (Chinese Taipei) Li Y-j	7	6	9
4	(South Korea) Shin Y-b (South Korea) Joo C-h	11	11	11

==== Section 4 ====
First round
(Germany) Y Wan (Germany) S Winter	11	10	9	13
WC	(Chinese Taipei) Cheng I-c (Chinese Taipei) Yeh Y-t	6	12	11	15
WC	(United States) J Reyes Lai (United States) A Wang	5	9	11	2
WC	(United States) S Moyland (United States) L Zhang	11	11	6	11

Second round
7	(India) D Chitale (India) Y Ghorpade	11	12	11	6	11
WC	(Chinese Taipei) Cheng I-c (Chinese Taipei) Yeh Y-t	13	10	4	11	7
WC	(United States) S Moyland (United States) L Zhang	8	3	6
2	(Japan) M Harimoto (Japan) H Hayata	11	11	11

Quarter-finals
7	(India) D Chitale (India) Y Ghorpade	8	3	5
2	(Japan) M Harimoto (Japan) H Hayata	11	11	11

== Mixed doubles ==
=== Seeds ===
1. (South Korea) Lim Jong-hoon / (South Korea) Shin Yu-bin (champions)
2. (Brazil) Hugo Calderano / (Brazil) Bruna Takahashi (semi-finals)
3. (Hong Kong) Wong Chun Ting / (Hong Kong) Doo Hoi Kem (second round)
4. (China) Wang Chuqin / (China) Sun Yingsha (final)
5. (India) Manush Shah / (India) Diya Chitale (second round)
6. (Spain) Álvaro Robles / (Spain) María Xiao (second round)
7. (Japan) Sora Matsushima / (Japan) Miwa Harimoto (quarter-finals)
8. (Romania) Eduard Ionescu / (Romania) Bernadette Szőcs (second round)

=== Finals ===
Semi-finals
1	(South Korea) Lim Jong-hoon (South Korea) Shin Yu-bin	13	11	5	11
WC	(China) Wen Ruibo (China) Kuai Man	11	6	11	9
4	(China) Wang Chuqin (China) Sun Yingsha	11	11	11
2	(Brazil) Hugo Calderano (Brazil) Bruna Takahashi	9	4	6

Final
1	(South Korea) Lim Jong-hoon (South Korea) Shin Yu-bin	11	6	7	11	11
4	(China) Wang Chuqin (China) Sun Yingsha	9	11	11	7	8

=== Top half ===
==== Section 1 ====
First round
(Denmark) A Lind (Wales) A Hursey	11	11	14
(Luxembourg) L Mladenovic (Hong Kong) Ng W L	7	5	12
(Germany) D Qiu (Germany) S Winter	11	11	11
(Chile) G Gomez (Chile) D Ortega	3	9	3

Second round
1	(South Korea) Lim J-h (South Korea) Shin Y-b	11	11	11
(Denmark) A Lind (Wales) A Hursey	9	3	8
(Germany) D Qiu (Germany) S Winter	9	10	11	11	13
8	(Romania) E Ionescu (Romania) B Szőcs	11	12	9	6	11

Quarter-finals
1	(South Korea) Lim J-h (South Korea) Shin Y-b	11	11	12
(Germany) D Qiu (Germany) S Winter	4	3	10

==== Section 2 ====
First round
WC	(China) Wen RB (China) Kuai M	11	11	6	11
(Australia) N Lum (Australia) Y Liu	1	9	11	5
(Germany) P Franziska (Puerto Rico) A Díaz	11	11	11
(Australia) A Sareen (Slovakia) B Várady	3	7	5

Second round
3	(Hong Kong) Wong C T (Hong Kong) Doo H K	8	12	11
WC	(China) Wen RB (China) Kuai M	11	14	13
(Germany) P Franziska (Puerto Rico) A Díaz	12	9	8	11	9
7	(Japan) S Matsushima (Japan) M Harimoto	10	11	11	5	11

Quarter-finals
WC	(China) Wen RB (China) Kuai M	11	11	8	11
7	(Japan) S Matsushima (Japan) M Harimoto	8	2	11	9

=== Bottom half ===
==== Section 3 ====
First round
(France) T Poret (France) P Pavade	11	12	4	11	6
(France) A Lebrun (Japan) S Odo	6	14	11	8	11
(Slovakia) Ľ Pištej (Slovakia) T Kukuľková	9	11	11	11
(Hong Kong) B Chan (South Korea) Kim N-y	11	6	8	9

Second round
6	(Spain) Á Robles (Spain) M Xiao	9	5	3
(France) A Lebrun (Japan) S Odo	11	11	11
(Slovakia) Ľ Pištej (Slovakia) T Kukuľková	7	6	4
4	(China) Wang CQ (China) Sun YS	11	11	11

Quarter-finals
(France) A Lebrun (Japan) S Odo	11	12	2	6	4
4	(China) Wang CQ (China) Sun YS	9	10	11	11	11

==== Section 4 ====
First round
(Singapore) K Pang (Singapore) Zeng J	11	11	10	12	4
WC	(United States) J Liang (United States) S Moyland	13	9	12	10	11
WC	(United States) N Naresh (United States) J Reyes Lai	14	11	11
WC	(United States) B Botha (China) Qin YX	12	5	6

Second round
5	(India) M Shah (India) D Chitale	11	6	4	8
WC	(United States) J Liang (United States) S Moyland	9	11	11	11
WC	(United States) N Naresh (United States) J Reyes Lai	7	15	3	8
2	(Brazil) H Calderano (Brazil) B Takahashi	11	13	11	11

Quarter-finals
WC	(United States) J Liang (United States) S Moyland	6	11	8	12	4
2	(Brazil) H Calderano (Brazil) B Takahashi	11	7	11	10	11

Preceded by WTT Star Contender Ljubljana 2026	2026 WTT Series	Succeeded by WTT Star Contender São José dos Campos 2026
