= WTT Contender Panagyurishte 2026 =

Table tennis tournament in Bulgaria

WTT Contender Panagyurishte 2026 presented by ASAREL
Tournament details
- Dates: 8–13 September
- Edition: 1st
- Total prize money: US$100,000
- Venue: Arena Asarel
- Location: Panagyurishte, Bulgaria

Champions
- Men's singles: (Sweden) Elias Ranefur
- Women's singles: (Japan) Hitomi Sato
- Men's doubles: (France) Florian Bourrassaud (France) Esteban Dorr
- Women's doubles: (Japan) Miu Hirano (Japan) Miyuu Kihara
- Mixed doubles: (Spain) Álvaro Robles (Spain) María Xiao

The WTT Contender Panagyurishte 2026 presented by ASAREL wa a table tennis tournament which took place at the Arena Asarel, Panagyurishte, Bulgaria, from 8 to 13 September and had a total prize money of US$100,000.

== Tournament ==
The WTT Contender Panagyurishte 2026 was the nineteenth tournament of the 2026 WTT Series and is part of the WTT Contender event. This is the first edition of the tournament as a WTT Contender event.

=== Venue ===
This tournament was held at the Arena Asarel in Panagyurishte, Bulgaria.

=== Point distribution ===
Below is the point distribution table for each phase of the tournament based on the WTT World Ranking for the WTT Contender event.

Event	Winner	Finalist	Semi-finalist	Quarter-finalist	Round of 16	Round of 32
Singles	400	280	180	120	30	4
Doubles	400	280	180	45	4	—

=== Prize pool ===
The total prize money was US$100,000 with the distribution of the prize money in accordance with WTT regulations.

Event	Winner	Finalist	Semi-finalist	Quarter-finalist	Round of 16	Round of 32
Singles	$5,000	$2,500	$1,275	$1,025	$825	$650
Doubles	$2,500	$1,500	$950	$550	$350	—

== Men's singles ==
=== Seeds ===
1. (France) Thibault Poret (quarter-finals)
2. (Germany) Dimitrij Ovtcharov (final)
3. (Sweden) Elias Ranefur (champion)
4. (Denmark) Jonathan Groth (first round)
5. (Czech Republic) Lubomír Jančařík (first round)
6. (Sweden) Kristian Karlsson (semi-finals)
7. (France) Joe Seyfried (second round)
8. (Japan) Kazuki Hamada (first round)

=== Finals ===
Semi-finals
6	(Sweden) Kristian Karlsson	10	11	11	6	12
3	(Sweden) Elias Ranefur	12	7	6	11	14
(Belgium) Cédric Nuytinck	11	5	6	8
2	(Germany) Dimitrij Ovtcharov	5	11	11	11

Final
3	(Sweden) Elias Ranefur	8	10	11	9	11	11	15
2	(Germany) Dimitrij Ovtcharov	11	12	5	11	5	9	13

=== Top half ===
==== Section 1 ====
First round
1	(France) T Poret	8	12	11	11
(Portugal) T Apolónia	11	10	4	7
WC	(Germany) R Walther	12	11	11	11
(Germany) W Verdonschot	14	6	7	5
(Spain) Á Robles	11	10	6	11	11
Q	(Germany) F Meng	8	12	11	7	9
Q	(Finland) A Naumi	2	2	3
6	(Sweden) K Karlsson	11	11	11

Second round
1	(France) T Poret	8	11	11	11
WC	(Germany) R Walther	11	4	4	4
(Spain) Á Robles	6	5	1
6	(Sweden) K Karlsson	11	11	11

Quarter-finals
1	(France) T Poret	6	11	11	11
6	(Sweden) K Karlsson	11	13	7	13

==== Section 2 ====
First round
3	(Sweden) E Ranefur	14	11	11
WC	(Bulgaria) P Krastev	12	9	1
Q	(Poland) M Kubik	6	12	10	11	10
WC	(Croatia) A Gaćina	11	10	12	8	12
(Japan) Y Sakai	11	7	6	12
(Poland) M Redzimski	8	11	11	14
Q	(Turkey) A Yigenler	9	7	11	6
7	(France) J Seyfried	11	11	7	11

Second round
3	(Sweden) E Ranefur	11	8	11	9	11
WC	(Croatia) A Gaćina	9	11	9	11	5
(Poland) M Redzimski	11	11	8	13
7	(France) J Seyfried	9	0	11	11

Quarter-finals
3	(Sweden) E Ranefur	11	11	11
(Poland) M Redzimski	5	9	9

=== Bottom half ===
==== Section 3 ====
First round
5	(Czech Republic) L Jančařík	11	7	11	6	4
(France) J Rolland	7	11	7	11	11
(Belgium) C Nuytinck	7	14	12	11
WC	(Bulgaria) Y Velichkov	11	12	10	5
(Germany) A Bertelsmeier	11	6	8	11	11
(France) L de Nodrest	8	11	11	4	4
(Japan) R Yoshiyama	7	11	11	11
4	(Denmark) J Groth	11	8	5	2

Second round
(France) J Rolland	6	11	11	8
(Belgium) C Nuytinck	11	13	9	11
(Germany) A Bertelsmeier	11	5	11	11
(Japan) R Yoshiyama	7	11	7	8

Quarter-finals
(Belgium) C Nuytinck	11	8	11	11	11
(Germany) A Bertelsmeier	4	11	7	13	6

==== Section 4 ====
First round
8	(Japan) K Hamada	6	8	11	12	8
Q	(France) R Brard	11	11	5	10	11
Q	(Japan) R Kawakami	11	12	11	9	12
(Portugal) M Freitas	5	14	4	11	10
Q	(Japan) Y Kizukuri	11	11	13
(Italy) J Oyebode	8	9	11
Q	(France) F Bourrassaud	11	6	11	7	5
2	(Germany) D Ovtcharov	9	11	9	11	11

Second round
Q	(France) R Brard	11	11	12	2	11
Q	(Japan) R Kawakami	7	6	14	11	13
Q	(Japan) Y Kizukuri	5	11	4	11	9
2	(Germany) D Ovtcharov	11	8	11	8	11

Quarter-finals
Q	(Japan) R Kawakami	11	14	2	11	8
2	(Germany) D Ovtcharov	6	16	11	8	11

== Women's singles ==
=== Seeds ===
1. (Japan) Hitomi Sato (champion)
2. (Japan) Miyu Nagasaki (semi-finals)
3. (Japan) Sakura Yokoi (final)
4. (Japan) Miyuu Kihara (second round)
5. (Japan) Miu Hirano (quarter-finals)
6. (Japan) Kaho Akae (quarter-finals)
7. (Chinese Taipei) Huang Yu-jie (quarter-finals)
8. (Spain) María Xiao (second round)

=== Finals ===
Semi-finals
1	(Japan) Hitomi Sato	11	12	11
WC	(Japan) Sachi Aoki	5	10	8
3	(Japan) Sakura Yokoi	14	11	10	11
2	(Japan) Miyu Nagasaki	12	5	12	7

Final
1	(Japan) Hitomi Sato	11	11	11	9	11
3	(Japan) Sakura Yokoi	7	6	7	11	7

=== Top half ===
==== Section 1 ====
First round
1	(Japan) H Sato	11	11	11
(United States) S Moyland	5	8	3
WC	(Bulgaria) M Yovkova	5	5	11	8
(England) T-T Ho	11	11	9	11
(India) M Batra	11	11	13
Q	(Serbia) I Lupulesku	4	5	11
(France) A Zarif	11	1	10	5
5	(Japan) M Hirano	8	11	12	11

Second round
1	(Japan) H Sato	11	11	11
(England) T-T Ho	7	8	4
(India) M Batra	11	6	12	4	7
5	(Japan) M Hirano	8	11	10	11	11

Quarter-finals
1	(Japan) H Sato	10	11	11	11
5	(Japan) M Hirano	12	4	3	5

==== Section 2 ====
First round
4	(Japan) M Kihara	10	11	13	6	11
Q	(France) A Salpin	12	3	11	11	7
WC	(Japan) S Aoki	11	15	11
WC	(Sweden) F Bergand	5	13	5
Q	(Germany) Y Wan	11	10	8	5
(Italy) G Piccolin	9	12	11	11
(Portugal) F Yu	10	5	11	11	5
7	(Chinese Taipei) Huang Y-j	12	11	9	9	11

Second round
4	(Japan) M Kihara	6	8	11	11	5
WC	(Japan) S Aoki	11	11	7	9	11
(Italy) G Piccolin	4	11	7	6
7	(Chinese Taipei) Huang Y-j	11	4	11	11

Quarter-finals
WC	(Japan) S Aoki	11	11	7	12
7	(Chinese Taipei) Huang Y-j	7	9	11	10

=== Bottom half ===
==== Section 3 ====
First round
8	(Spain) M Xiao	5	17	11	11
(Serbia) S Šurjan	11	15	5	7
(France) Ch Lutz	4	8	11	11	3
Q	(Croatia) H Arapović	11	11	7	6	11
Q	(Chile) D Ortega	8	5	9
(France) Ca Lutz	11	11	11
(Italy) G Monfardini	7	7	9
3	(Japan) S Yokoi	11	11	11

Second round
8	(Spain) M Xiao	11	5	9	11	8
Q	(Croatia) H Arapović	2	11	11	7	11
(France) Ca Lutz	11	11	6	9	4
3	(Japan) S Yokoi	6	9	11	11	11

Quarter-finals
Q	(Croatia) H Arapović	11	11	3	7	3
3	(Japan) S Yokoi	8	9	11	11	11

==== Section 4 ====
First round
6	(Japan) K Akae	11	11	11
Q	(France) C Picard	5	3	7
(Romania) E Zaharia	8	9	7
WC	(Japan) Y Ojio	11	11	11
Q	(Spain) S-X Zhang	11	8	7	10
(Sweden) C Källberg	8	11	11	12
Q	(France) C de Stoppeleire	9	5	8
2	(Japan) M Nagasaki	11	11	11

Second round
6	(Japan) K Akae	15	11	11
WC	(Japan) Y Ojio	13	5	8
(Sweden) C Källberg	4	5	9
2	(Japan) M Nagasaki	11	11	11

Quarter-finals
6	(Japan) K Akae	8	12	7	7
2	(Japan) M Nagasaki	11	10	11	11

== Men's doubles ==
=== Seeds ===
1. (France) Florian Bourrassaud / (France) Esteban Dorr (champions)
2. (Chile) Gustavo Gomez / (Chile) Nicolás Burgos (quarter-finals)
3. (France) Leo de Nodrest / (France) Jules Rolland (first round)
4. (France) Vincent Picard / (France) Joe Seyfried (quarter-finals)

=== Finals ===
Semi-finals
1	(France) Florian Bourrassaud (France) Esteban Dorr	12	14	10	11
(Germany) Andre Bertelsmeier (Germany) Wim Verdonschot	10	12	12	8
(Turkey) Ibrahim Gündüz (Turkey) Abdullah Yigenler	5	11	6	5
(Japan) Kazuki Hamada (Japan) Yuhi Sakai	11	6	11	11

Final
1	(France) Florian Bourrassaud (France) Esteban Dorr	3	6	11	11	11
(Japan) Kazuki Hamada (Japan) Yuhi Sakai	11	11	9	7	9

=== Top half ===
First round
1	(France) F Bourrassaud (France) E Dorr	11	11	11
Q	(Italy) J Oyebode (Italy) C Rossi	7	3	9
Q	(Puerto Rico) A Naranjo (Sweden) M Friis	6	3	11	14
(Portugal) T Apolónia (Portugal) M Freitas	11	11	8	16
3	(France) L de Nodrest (France) J Rolland	9	4	11
(Germany) A Bertelsmeier (Germany) W Verdonschot	11	11	13
Q	(Finland) A Naumi (Portugal) A Doyen	11	8	7
(Saudi Arabia) A Al-Khadrawi (Saudi Arabia) A Bu Shulaybi	13	11	11

Quarter-finals
1	(France) F Bourrassaud (France) E Dorr	11	10	13	14
(Portugal) T Apolónia (Portugal) M Freitas	5	12	11	12
(Germany) A Bertelsmeier (Germany) W Verdonschot	8	11	11	11
(Saudi Arabia) A Al-Khadrawi (Saudi Arabia) A Bu Shulaybi	11	5	6	6

Semi-finals
1	(France) F Bourrassaud (France) E Dorr	12	14	10	11
(Germany) A Bertelsmeier (Germany) W Verdonschot	10	12	12	8

=== Bottom half ===
First round
(Turkey) I Gündüz (Turkey) A Yigenler	11	11	11
(Italy) D Pinto (Italy) F Vallino	5	8	9
Q	(Bulgaria) V Petkov (Bulgaria) I Kosev	12	5	7	4
4	(France) V Picard (France) J Seyfried	10	11	11	11
WC	(Bulgaria) Y Velichkov (Bulgaria) P Krastev	8	5	9
(Japan) K Hamada (Japan) Y Sakai	11	11	11
(Poland) M Kubik (Poland) M Redzimski	11	15	7	6	7
2	(Chile) G Gomez (Chile) N Burgos	8	13	11	11	11

Quarter-finals
(Turkey) I Gündüz (Turkey) A Yigenler	12	11	6	11
4	(France) V Picard (France) J Seyfried	10	9	11	4
(Japan) K Hamada (Japan) Y Sakai	5	14	8	11	11
2	(Chile) G Gomez (Chile) N Burgos	11	12	11	3	9

Semi-finals
(Turkey) I Gündüz (Turkey) A Yigenler	5	11	6	5
(Japan) K Hamada (Japan) Y Sakai	11	6	11	11

== Women's doubles ==
=== Seeds ===
1. (Japan) Sakura Yokoi / (Japan) Sachi Aoki (semi-finals)
2. (Chile) Daniela Ortega / (Chile) Paulina Vega (first round)
3. (Japan) Miu Hirano / (Japan) Miyuu Kihara (champions)
4. (Serbia) Izabela Lupulesku / (Serbia) Sabina Šurjan (quarter-finals)

=== Finals ===
Semi-finals
1	(Japan) Sakura Yokoi (Japan) Sachi Aoki	5	11	11	10	1
3	(Japan) Miu Hirano (Japan) Miyuu Kihara	11	6	8	12	11
(Italy) Nicole Arlia (Italy) Gaia Monfardini	11	6	11	8	11
Q	(Germany) Yuan Wan (Italy) Giorgia Piccolin	9	11	4	11	7

Final
3	(Japan) Miu Hirano (Japan) Miyuu Kihara	13	11	11
(Italy) Nicole Arlia (Italy) Gaia Monfardini	11	7	7

=== Top half ===
First round
1	(Japan) S Yokoi (Japan) S Aoki	10	11	11	11
(Mexico) A Cossio (Austria) K Mischek-Colucci	12	8	6	4
Q	(Bulgaria) M Yovkova (Bulgaria) K Hristova	12	9	7	11	12
WC	(Bulgaria) S Mutlu (Bulgaria) T Georgieva	10	11	11	9	10
3	(Japan) M Hirano (Japan) M Kihara	11	11	11
(England) T-T Ho (Slovakia) T Kukuľková	8	8	6
Q	(Serbia) R Bezeg (Serbia) S Radak	11	11	9	7	7
Q	(Croatia) D Ćosić (Croatia) H Arapović	5	7	11	11	11

Quarter-finals
1	(Japan) S Yokoi (Japan) S Aoki	11	11	11
Q	(Bulgaria) M Yovkova (Bulgaria) K Hristova	7	2	1
3	(Japan) M Hirano (Japan) M Kihara	11	11	9	11
Q	(Croatia) D Ćosić (Croatia) H Arapović	3	5	11	5

Semi-finals
1	(Japan) S Yokoi (Japan) S Aoki	5	11	11	10	1
3	(Japan) M Hirano (Japan) M Kihara	11	6	8	12	11

=== Bottom half ===
First round
(Japan) M Nagasaki (Japan) Y Ojio	7	11	8	12
(Italy) N Arlia (Italy) G Monfardini	11	7	11	14
Q	(Chile) V Rios (Chile) S Vega	5	10	3
4	(Serbia) I Lupulesku (Serbia) S Šurjan	11	12	11
WC	(Bulgaria) A Petkova (Bulgaria) V Persova	3	5	11	5
(France) Ca Lutz (France) A Zarif	11	11	9	11
Q	(Germany) Y Wan (Italy) G Piccolin	11	11	2	11
2	(Chile) D Ortega (Chile) P Vega	6	2	11	5

Quarter-finals
(Italy) N Arlia (Italy) G Monfardini	11	8	11	11
4	(Serbia) I Lupulesku (Serbia) S Šurjan	7	11	9	8
(France) Ca Lutz (France) A Zarif	8	10	11	12
Q	(Germany) Y Wan (Italy) G Piccolin	11	12	7	14

Semi-finals
(Italy) N Arlia (Italy) G Monfardini	11	6	11	8	11
Q	(Germany) Y Wan (Italy) G Piccolin	9	11	4	11	7

== Mixed doubles ==
=== Seeds ===
1. (Chile) Gustavo Gomez / (Chile) Daniela Ortega (semi-finals)
2. (Sweden) Kristian Karlsson / (Sweden) Christina Källberg (semi-finals)
3. (Poland) Marek Badowski / (Slovakia) Tatiana Kukuľková (final)
4. (Turkey) Abdullah Yigenler / (Turkey) Ece Haraç (first round)

=== Finals ===
Semi-finals
1	(Chile) Gustavo Gomez (Chile) Daniela Ortega	7	8	5
3	(Poland) Marek Badowski (Slovakia) Tatiana Kukuľková	11	11	11
Q	(Spain) Álvaro Robles (Spain) María Xiao	11	13	11	11
2	(Sweden) Kristian Karlsson (Sweden) Christina Källberg	5	15	8	6

Final
3	(Poland) Marek Badowski (Slovakia) Tatiana Kukuľková	6	7	8
Q	(Spain) Álvaro Robles (Spain) María Xiao	11	11	11

=== Top half ===
First round
1	(Chile) G Gomez (Chile) D Ortega	11	11	11
(France) T Poret (France) Ch Lutz	7	9	7
Q	(Bulgaria) I Kosev (Bulgaria) S Mutlu	7	7	11	4
Q	(Italy) J Oyebode (Italy) G Monfardini	11	11	8	11
3	(Poland) M Badowski (Slovakia) T Kukuľková	11	11	11
Q	(Slovakia) A Klajber (Slovakia) E Labosova	4	9	4
(Sweden) M Friis (Sweden) F Bergand	9	13	11	6	11
WC	(Bulgaria) P Krastev (Bulgaria) M Yovkova	11	11	8	11	2

Quarter-finals
1	(Chile) G Gomez (Chile) D Ortega	11	11	14
Q	(Italy) J Oyebode (Italy) G Monfardini	5	6	12
3	(Poland) M Badowski (Slovakia) T Kukuľková	11	13	7	11
(Sweden) M Friis (Sweden) F Bergand	8	11	11	3

Semi-finals
1	(Chile) G Gomez (Chile) D Ortega	7	8	5
3	(Poland) M Badowski (Slovakia) T Kukuľková	11	11	11

=== Bottom half ===
First round
Q	(Germany) A Bertelsmeier (Germany) Y Wan	11	8	11	11
(Chile) N Burgos (Chile) P Vega	9	11	1	9
Q	(Spain) Á Robles (Spain) M Xiao	11	5	11	11
4	(Turkey) A Yigenler (Turkey) E Haraç	8	11	6	9
WC	(Bulgaria) Y Velichkov (Serbia) I Lupulesku	7	9	12	12	11
(France) L de Nodrest (France) Ca Lutz	11	11	10	10	7
(Germany) C Meissner (England) T-T Ho	12	9	6
2	(Sweden) K Karlsson (Sweden) C Källberg	14	11	11

Quarter-finals
Q	(Germany) A Bertelsmeier (Germany) Y Wan	7	3	11
Q	(Spain) Á Robles (Spain) M Xiao	11	11	13
WC	(Bulgaria) Y Velichkov (Serbia) I Lupulesku	7	7	11	9
2	(Sweden) K Karlsson (Sweden) C Källberg	11	11	6	11

Semi-finals
Q	(Spain) Á Robles (Spain) M Xiao	11	13	11	11
2	(Sweden) K Karlsson (Sweden) C Källberg	5	15	8	6

Preceded by WTT Contender Almaty 2026	2026 WTT Series	Succeeded by WTT Star Contender Astana 2026
