= WTT Contender Almaty 2026 =

Table tennis tournament in Kazakhstan

Tournament details
- Dates: 1–6 September
- Edition: 5th
- Total prize money: US$100,000
- Venue: Table Tennis Centre ADD
- Location: Almaty, Kazakhstan

Champions
- Men's singles: (Japan) Shunsuke Togami
- Women's singles: (Japan) Miu Hirano
- Men's doubles: (Russia) Lev Katsman (Russia) Maksim Grebnev
- Women's doubles: (Japan) Miu Hirano (Japan) Miyuu Kihara
- Mixed doubles: (Russia) Evgeny Tikhonov (Russia) Maria Panfilova

The WTT Contender Almaty 2026 was a table tennis tournament that took place at the Table Tennis Centre ADD, Almaty, Kazakhstan, from 1 to 6 September and had a total prize money of US$100,000.

== Tournament ==
The WTT Contender Almaty 2026 was the seventeenth tournament of the 2026 WTT Series and also part of the WTT Contender event.

=== Venue ===
This tournament was held at the Table Tennis Centre ADD in Almaty, Kazakhstan.

=== Point distribution ===
Below is the point distribution table for each phase of the tournament based on the WTT World Ranking for the WTT Contender event.

Event	Winner	Finalist	Semi-finalist	Quarter-finalist	Round of 16	Round of 32
Singles	400	280	180	120	30	4
Doubles	400	280	180	45	4	—

=== Prize pool ===
The total prize money is US$100,000 with the distribution of the prize money in accordance with WTT regulations.

Event	Winner	Finalist	Semi-finalist	Quarter-finalist	Round of 16	Round of 32
Singles	$5,000	$2,500	$1,275	$1,025	$825	$650
Doubles	$2,500	$1,500	$950	$550	$350	—

== Men's singles ==
=== Seeds ===
1. (Japan) Shunsuke Togami (champion)
2. (France) Simon Gauzy (final)
3. (India) Manush Shah (second round)
4. (Sweden) Kristian Karlsson (second round)
5. (Kazakhstan) Kirill Gerassimenko (second round)
6. (Japan) Ryoichi Yoshiyama (second round)
7. (Spain) Álvaro Robles (quarter-finals)
8. (Japan) Kazuki Hamada (semi-finals)

=== Finals ===
Semi-finals
1	(Japan) Shunsuke Togami	11	11	11
8	(Japan) Kazuki Hamada	9	8	7
(Russia) Evgeny Tikhonov	11	9	9	7
2/WC	(France) Simon Gauzy	6	11	11	11

Final
1	(Japan) Shunsuke Togami	12	11	11	11
2/WC	(France) Simon Gauzy	10	8	3	7

=== Top half ===
==== Section 1 ====
First round
1	(Japan) S Togami	11	11	11
(Kazakhstan) A Kurmangaliyev	8	6	7
Q	(Ecuador) A Miño	3	7	9
(France) F Bourrassaud	11	11	11
(France) V Picard	11	9	11	10	11
Q	(Kazakhstan) I Artukmetov	2	11	8	12	5
(Puerto Rico) A Naranjo	8	11	11	6	3
7	(Spain) Á Robles	11	8	9	11	11

Second round
1	(Japan) S Togami	11	11	12
(France) F Bourrassaud	6	6	10
(France) V Picard	9	8	11	7
7	(Spain) Á Robles	11	11	6	11

Quarter-finals
1	(Japan) S Togami	11	10	14	11
7	(Spain) Á Robles	3	12	12	9

==== Section 2 ====
First round
3	(India) M Shah	11	11	11
Q	(Russia) L Volin	8	6	3
(Germany) R Walther	9	3	12	11	6
Q	(Russia) D Ivonin	11	11	10	8	11
WC	(Sweden) M Karlsson	7	11	11	12
Q	(Kazakhstan) S Zhubanov	11	3	6	10
(France) E Dorr	11	12	9	10	3
8	(Japan) K Hamada	6	10	11	12	11

Second round
3	(India) M Shah	8	6	6
Q	(Russia) D Ivonin	11	11	11
WC	(Sweden) M Karlsson	11	7	11	12	9
8	(Japan) K Hamada	7	11	4	14	11

Quarter-finals
Q	(Russia) D Ivonin	12	4	9
8	(Japan) K Hamada	14	11	11

=== Bottom half ===
==== Section 3 ====
First round
6	(Japan) R Yoshiyama	11	11	11
Q	(Kazakhstan) I Kharki	7	5	3
(Russia) E Tikhonov	11	8	11	13
(Russia) N Artemenko	6	11	4	11
(India) P Jain	10	8	11	11	6
(France) A Kouraichi	12	11	8	9	11
Q	(Russia) L Katsman	7	11	6	10
4	(Sweden) K Karlsson	11	4	11	12

Second round
6	(Japan) R Yoshiyama	6	9	12
(Russia) E Tikhonov	11	11	14
(France) A Kouraichi	1	11	4	11	12
4	(Sweden) K Karlsson	11	7	11	8	10

Quarter-finals
(Russia) E Tikhonov	9	11	9	11	11
(France) A Kouraichi	11	6	11	7	7

==== Section 4 ====
First round
5	(Kazakhstan) K Gerassimenko	11	11	11
(Japan) M Oikawa	7	6	8
(Germany) F Meng	9	4	11	4
WC	(Kazakhstan) Fang B	11	11	8	11
WC	(Japan) Y Tanaka	11	13	11
(Japan) K Yoshiyama	5	11	9
Q	(Russia) K Skachkov	4	9	11	8
2/WC	(France) S Gauzy	11	11	8	11

Second round
5	(Kazakhstan) K Gerassimenko	11	11	7	11	7
WC	(Kazakhstan) Fang B	13	9	11	8	11
WC	(Japan) Y Tanaka	11	11	5	8	7
2/WC	(France) S Gauzy	7	8	11	11	11

Quarter-finals
WC	(Kazakhstan) Fang B	1	2	5
2/WC	(France) S Gauzy	11	11	11

== Women's singles ==
=== Seeds ===
1. (Japan) Hina Hayata (final)
2. (Japan) Miyu Nagasaki (semi-finals)
3. (Puerto Rico) Adriana Díaz (semi-finals)
4. (Japan) Miyuu Kihara (first round)
5. (Japan) Miu Hirano (champion)
6. (Japan) Kaho Akae (quarter-finals)
7. (Russia) Elizabet Abraamian (quarter-finals)
8. (Germany) Annett Kaufmann (quarter-finals)

=== Finals ===
Semi-finals
1	(Japan) Hina Hayata	11	5	11	11
3	(Puerto Rico) Adriana Díaz	8	11	4	2
5	(Japan) Miu Hirano	4	11	11	11
2	(Japan) Miyu Nagasaki	11	8	6	7

Final
1	(Japan) Hina Hayata	9	11	7	1	8
5	(Japan) Miu Hirano	11	9	11	11	11

=== Top half ===
==== Section 1 ====
First round
1	(Japan) H Hayata	11	11	11
(Chinese Taipei) Li Y-j	7	7	6
(Chinese Taipei) Chien T-c	11	11	8	4	11
(India) D Chitale	7	5	11	11	9
(Sweden) C Källberg	5	6	11	11	11
Q	(Russia) V Kotsiur	11	11	8	7	9
(Kazakhstan) Z Akasheva	14	6	9	7
7	(Russia) E Abraamian	12	11	11	11

Second round
1	(Japan) H Hayata	12	11	11
(Chinese Taipei) Chien T-c	10	9	6
(Sweden) C Källberg	5	14	9	8
7	(Russia) E Abraamian	11	12	11	11

Quarter-finals
1	(Japan) H Hayata	11	11	11
7	(Russia) E Abraamian	9	6	6

==== Section 2 ====
First round
3	(Puerto Rico) A Díaz	6	11	12	11	11
(Chinese Taipei) Huang Y-j	11	9	14	5	7
Q	(Russia) O Vorobeva	7	9	7
(India) S Das	11	11	11
(Japan) Y Ojio	10	7	7
Q	(Russia) M Panfilova	12	11	11
(South Korea) Lee Z-i	12	2	14	9
8	(Germany) A Kaufmann	14	11	12	11

Second round
3	(Puerto Rico) A Díaz	11	11	11
(India) S Das	6	5	8
Q	(Russia) M Panfilova	12	7	7
8	(Germany) A Kaufmann	14	11	11

Quarter-finals
3	(Puerto Rico) A Díaz	11	11	8	11
8	(Germany) A Kaufmann	8	8	11	8

=== Bottom half ===
==== Section 3 ====
First round
5	(Japan) M Hirano	11	11	11
Q	(Russia) O Vishniakova	1	9	8
Q	(Luxembourg) X L Ni	9	6	15
(South Korea) Yang H-e	11	11	17
(Russia) V Voronina	11	11	8	11
WC	(Kazakhstan) S Mirkadirova	7	3	11	3
Q	(India) S Ghosh	13	11	5	11
4	(Japan) M Kihara	11	7	11	7

Second round
5	(Japan) M Hirano	11	11	9	11
(South Korea) Yang H-e	5	8	11	8
(Russia) V Voronina	11	11	11
Q	(India) S Ghosh	7	5	6

Quarter-finals
5	(Japan) M Hirano	11	11	11
(Russia) V Voronina	8	6	3

==== Section 4 ====
First round
6	(Japan) K Akae	11	11	11
WC	(Kazakhstan) Z Koshkhumbayeva	10	7	6
Q	(Italy) D Vivarelli	11	8	11	10	11
WC	(Kazakhstan) A Romanovskaya	3	11	3	12	4
(India) Y Ghorpade	11	9	3	11	11
Q	(Russia) V Shcherbatykh	7	11	11	4	7
(India) S Mukherjee	9	10	3
2	(Japan) M Nagasaki	11	12	11

Second round
6	(Japan) K Akae	11	8	11	11
Q	(Italy) D Vivarelli	7	11	4	4
(India) Y Ghorpade	8	9	11	13
2	(Japan) M Nagasaki	11	11	8	15

Quarter-finals
6	(Japan) K Akae	6	8	11	11	10
2	(Japan) M Nagasaki	11	11	4	9	12

== Men's doubles ==
=== Seeds ===
1. (France) Florian Bourrassaud / (France) Esteban Dorr (quarter-finals)
2. (Russia) Lev Katsman / (Russia) Maksim Grebnev (champions)
3. (Sweden) Mattias Karlsson / (Sweden) Kristian Karlsson (final)
4. (Japan) Kazuki Hamada / (Japan) Hayate Suzuki (semi-finals)

=== Finals ===
Semi-finals
(Japan) Ryoichi Yoshiyama (Japan) Kazuki Yoshiyama	10	8	4
3/WC	(Sweden) Mattias Karlsson (Sweden) Kristian Karlsson	12	11	11
4	(Japan) Kazuki Hamada (Japan) Hayate Suzuki	7	10	3
2	(Russia) Lev Katsman (Russia) Maksim Grebnev	11	12	11

Final
3/WC	(Sweden) Mattias Karlsson (Sweden) Kristian Karlsson	9	11	11	7	9
2	(Russia) Lev Katsman (Russia) Maksim Grebnev	11	8	7	11	11

=== Top half ===
First round
1	(France) F Bourrassaud (France) E Dorr	11	11	11
(Kazakhstan) I Artukmetov (Kazakhstan) S Kurmambayev	6	2	6
(Japan) R Yoshiyama (Japan) K Yoshiyama	4	12	11	11
(Russia) N Artemenko (Russia) D Ivonin	11	10	6	6
3/WC	(Sweden) M Karlsson (Sweden) K Karlsson	11	10	11	10	11
Q	(Kazakhstan) I Kharki (Kazakhstan) Fang B	6	12	7	12	2
(Russia) E Tikhonov (Russia) D Vinogradov	11	11	11
Q	(Kazakhstan) D Kenzhigulov (Kazakhstan) T Jiyenbayev	6	6	6

Quarter-finals
1	(France) F Bourrassaud (France) E Dorr	12	5	7
(Japan) R Yoshiyama (Japan) K Yoshiyama	14	11	11
3/WC	(Sweden) M Karlsson (Sweden) K Karlsson	7	11	11	11
(Russia) E Tikhonov (Russia) D Vinogradov	11	8	7	4

Semi-finals
(Japan) R Yoshiyama (Japan) K Yoshiyama	10	8	4
3/WC	(Sweden) M Karlsson (Sweden) K Karlsson	12	11	11

=== Bottom half ===
First round
Q	(Germany) R Walther (Germany) F Meng	8	11	7	6
WC	(Kazakhstan) K Gerassimenko (Kazakhstan) A Kurmangaliyev	11	9	11	11
(France) A Kouraichi (France) V Picard	10	9	14	13	7
4	(Japan) K Hamada (Japan) H Suzuki	12	11	12	11	11
(Kazakhstan) V Zakharov (Kazakhstan) B Akimali	4	11	7	11	4
Q	(Kazakhstan) A Kenzhigulov (Kazakhstan) S Zhubanov	11	8	11	8	11
(Saudi Arabia) A Al-Khadrawi (Saudi Arabia) A Bu Shulaybi	6	3	8
2	(Russia) L Katsman (Russia) M Grebnev	11	11	11

Quarter-finals
WC	(Kazakhstan) K Gerassimenko (Kazakhstan) A Kurmangaliyev	11	9	8	10
4	(Japan) K Hamada (Japan) H Suzuki	4	11	11	12
Q	(Kazakhstan) A Kenzhigulov (Kazakhstan) S Zhubanov	8	5	5
2	(Russia) L Katsman (Russia) M Grebnev	11	11	11

Semi-finals
4	(Japan) K Hamada (Japan) H Suzuki	7	10	3
2	(Russia) L Katsman (Russia) M Grebnev	11	12	11

== Women's doubles ==
=== Seeds ===
1. (India) Diya Chitale / (India) Yashaswini Ghorpade (semi-finals)
2. (Chinese Taipei) Chien Tung-chuan / (Chinese Taipei) Li Yu-jhun (quarter-finals)
3. (India) Syndrela Das / (India) Sutirtha Mukherjee (final)
4. (Russia) Elizabet Abraamian / (Russia) Vlada Voronina (first round)

=== Finals ===
Semi-finals
1	(India) Diya Chitale (India) Yashaswini Ghorpade	6	10	11	6
3	(India) Syndrela Das (India) Sutirtha Mukherjee	11	12	8	11
(Japan) Miu Hirano (Japan) Miyuu Kihara	11	11	11
(Russia) Mariia Tailakova (Russia) Ekaterina Zironova	3	5	2

Final
3	(India) Syndrela Das (India) Sutirtha Mukherjee	2	5	18
(Japan) Miu Hirano (Japan) Miyuu Kihara	11	11	20

=== Top half ===
First round
1	(India) D Chitale (India) Y Ghorpade	11	10	11	11
(Russia) V Shcherbatykh (Russia) M Panfilova	8	12	6	9
(Russia) A Slautina (Russia) A Zavarykina	11	16	11
WC	(Kazakhstan) A Romanovskaya (Kazakhstan) A Zhaxylykova	6	14	8
3	(India) S Das (India) S Mukherjee	11	11	8	11
(Kazakhstan) A Ashkeyeva (Kazakhstan) N Nurman	8	2	11	8
WC	(Kazakhstan) D Fu (Kazakhstan) M Lukyanova	11	11	11
(Kazakhstan) S Akhmadaliyeva (Kazakhstan) N Serikbay	6	5	9

Quarter-finals
1	(India) D Chitale (India) Y Ghorpade	11	12	11
(Russia) A Slautina (Russia) A Zavarykina	8	10	7
3	(India) S Das (India) S Mukherjee	11	11	10	11
WC	(Kazakhstan) D Fu (Kazakhstan) M Lukyanova	5	3	12	7

Semi-finals
1	(India) D Chitale (India) Y Ghorpade	6	10	11	6
3	(India) S Das (India) S Mukherjee	11	12	8	11

=== Bottom half ===
First round
(Kazakhstan) D Gamova (Kazakhstan) N Khaniyazova	10	11	6	11	11
(Kazakhstan) G Torshayeva (Kazakhstan) Z Koshkumbayeva	12	5	11	9	13
(Japan) M Hirano (Japan) M Kihara	11	11	8	11
4	(Russia) E Abraamian (Russia) V Voronina	1	9	11	9
(Russia) M Tailakova (Russia) E Zironova	11	11	11
(Kazakhstan) Y Okhmak (Kazakhstan) A Amangeldi	7	6	6
(Kazakhstan) Z Akasheva (Kazakhstan) S Mirkadirova	11	9	4	9
2	(Chinese Taipei) Chien T-c (Chinese Taipei) Li Y-j	9	11	11	11

Quarter-finals
(Kazakhstan) G Torshayeva (Kazakhstan) Z Koshkumbayeva	3	4	1
(Japan) M Hirano (Japan) M Kihara	11	11	11
(Russia) M Tailakova (Russia) E Zironova	11	11	11
2	(Chinese Taipei) Chien T-c (Chinese Taipei) Li Y-j	9	9	7

Semi-finals
(Japan) M Hirano (Japan) M Kihara	11	11	11
(Russia) M Tailakova (Russia) E Zironova	3	5	2

== Mixed doubles ==
=== Seeds ===
1. (India) Manush Shah / (India) Diya Chitale (quarter-finals)
2. (Sweden) Kristian Karlsson / (Sweden) Christina Källberg (semi-finals)
3. (India) Payas Jain / (India) Syndrela Das (quarter-finals)
4. (Japan) Shunsuke Togami / (Japan) Hina Hayata (quarter-finals)

=== Finals ===
Semi-finals
(Russia) Nikita Artemenko (Russia) Elizabet Abraamian	9	6	12
(Russia) Evgeny Tikhonov (Russia) Maria Panfilova	11	11	14
(Japan) Kazuki Yoshiyama (Japan) Yuna Ojio	11	7	11	14
2	(Sweden) Kristian Karlsson (Sweden) Christina Källberg	6	11	6	12

Final
(Russia) Evgeny Tikhonov (Russia) Maria Panfilova	11	11	11
(Japan) Kazuki Yoshiyama (Japan) Yuna Ojio	9	4	5

=== Top half ===
First round
1	(India) M Shah (India) D Chitale	11	11	11
Q	(Kazakhstan) S Zhubanov (Kazakhstan) A Zhaxylykova	9	5	9
WC	(Kazakhstan) K Gerassimenko (Kazakhstan) Z Akasheva	9	11	9	8
(Russia) N Artemenko (Russia) E Abraamian	11	9	11	11
4	(Japan) S Togami (Japan) H Hayata	11	11	11
Q	(Russia) D Ivonin (Russia) M Tailakova	7	5	9
(Russia) E Tikhonov (Russia) M Panfilova	10	12	11	11
(Puerto Rico) A Naranjo (Puerto Rico) A Díaz	12	10	8	7

Quarter-finals
1	(India) M Shah (India) D Chitale	8	11	9	4
(Russia) N Artemenko (Russia) E Abraamian	11	8	11	11
4	(Japan) S Togami (Japan) H Hayata	8	7	2
(Russia) E Tikhonov (Russia) M Panfilova	11	11	11

Semi-finals
(Russia) N Artemenko (Russia) E Abraamian	9	6	12
(Russia) E Tikhonov (Russia) M Panfilova	11	11	14

=== Bottom half ===
First round
(Kazakhstan) A Mamay (Kazakhstan) N Khaniyazova
(Japan) K Yoshiyama (Japan) Y Ojio	w	/	o
(Kazakhstan) I Kharki (Kazakhstan) N Nurman	6	8	11	12
3	(India) P Jain (India) S Das	11	11	9	14
Q	(Kazakhstan) A Kurmangaliyev (Kazakhstan) D Fu	7	11	3	11	11
WC	(Kazakhstan) Fang B (Kazakhstan) S Mirkadirova	11	9	11	9	9
Q	(Kazakhstan) A Torgaibekov (Kazakhstan) Y Okhmak	7	7	5
2	(Sweden) K Karlsson (Sweden) C Källberg	11	11	11

Quarter-finals
(Japan) K Yoshiyama (Japan) Y Ojio	5	12	11	11
3	(India) P Jain (India) S Das	11	10	3	7
Q	(Kazakhstan) A Kurmangaliyev (Kazakhstan) D Fu	7	5	6
2	(Sweden) K Karlsson (Sweden) C Källberg	11	11	11

Semi-finals
(Japan) K Yoshiyama (Japan) Y Ojio	11	7	11	14
2	(Sweden) K Karlsson (Sweden) C Källberg	6	11	6	12

Preceded by Europe Smash – Sweden 2026	2026 WTT Series	Succeeded by WTT Champions Macao 2026; WTT Contender Panagyurishte 2026
