= 2025 World Table Tennis Championships – Men's singles =

Men's singles at the 2025 World Table Tennis Championships
- Venue: Lusail Sports Arena; Qatar University Sports Complex
- Location: Doha, Qatar
- Dates: 17–25 May

Medalists
gold medal	Wang Chuqin	China
silver medal	Hugo Calderano	Brazil
bronze medal	Liang Jingkun	China
bronze medal	Truls Möregårdh	Sweden

The men's singles competition of the 2025 World Table Tennis Championships was held from 17 to 25 May 2025. The event was played as a straight knockout. All singles matches were best of 7 games.

China's Wang Chuqin captured his first men's singles title at the World Championships by defeating Brazil's Hugo Calderano in the final.

== Seeds ==
Singles events had 32 seeded players. Seeding was based on the ITTF world ranking published on 29 April 2025.

1. (China) Lin Shidong (quarterfinals)
2. (China) Wang Chuqin (champion)
3. (Brazil) Hugo Calderano (final)
4. (Japan) Tomokazu Harimoto (third round)
5. (China) Liang Jingkun (semifinals)
6. (France) Félix Lebrun (fourth round)
7. (Sweden) Truls Möregårdh (semifinals)
8. (Germany) Patrick Franziska (fourth round)
9. (France) Alexis Lebrun (second round, withdrew)
10. (Germany) Dang Qiu (second round)
11. (Slovenia) Darko Jorgić (fourth round)
12. (South Korea) Jang Woo-jin (fourth round)
13. (Chinese Taipei) Lin Yun-ju (quarterfinals)
14. (Germany) Benedikt Duda (third round)
15. (Sweden) Anton Källberg (fourth round)
16. (China) Lin Gaoyuan (third round)
17. (South Korea) An Jae-hyun (quarterfinals)
18. (Denmark) Jonathan Groth (withdrew)
19. (Nigeria) Quadri Aruna (fourth round)
20. (Japan) Hiroto Shinozuka (second round)
21. (Germany) Dimitrij Ovtcharov (first round, withdrew)
22. (South Korea) Oh Jun-sung (third round)
23. (Egypt) Omar Assar (second round)
24. (Denmark) Anders Lind (second round)
25. (Chinese Taipei) Kao Cheng-jui (third round)
26. (United States) Kanak Jha (second round)
27. (Japan) Shunsuke Togami (quarterfinals)
28. (South Korea) Cho Dae-seong (third round)
29. (France) Thibault Poret (second round)
30. (Australia) Finn Luu (first round)
31. (Spain) Álvaro Robles (second round)
32. (Germany) Ricardo Walther (second round)

== Draw ==
The draw took place on 30 April 2025. Players of the same association were separated only in the first round.

=== Key ===
- r = Retired
- w/o = Walkover

=== Finals ===
Quarterfinals
1	(China) Lin Shidong	5	8	11	11	8	11	7
5	(China) Liang Jingkun	11	11	7	5	11	8	11
17	(South Korea) An Jae-hyun	4	6	11	7	10
3	(Brazil) Hugo Calderano	11	11	9	11	12
27	(Japan) Shunsuke Togami	16	11	7	8	10	9
7	(Sweden) Truls Möregårdh	14	3	11	11	12	11
13	(Chinese Taipei) Lin Yun-ju	10	8	8	10
2	(China) Wang Chuqin	12	11	11	12

Semifinals
5	(China) Liang Jingkun	13	7	11	8	11	11	9
3	(Brazil) Hugo Calderano	15	11	8	11	3	7	11
7	(Sweden) Truls Möregårdh	11	8	2	10	10
2	(China) Wang Chuqin	5	11	11	12	12

Final
3	(Brazil) Hugo Calderano	10	3	11	2	7
2	(China) Wang Chuqin	12	11	4	11	11

=== Top half ===
==== Section 1 ====
First round
1	(China) Lin S.	11	12	11	11
(England) Pitchford	9	10	2	9
(India) Bhattacharjee	11	7	9	10	8
(Hong Kong) Lam	4	11	11	12	11
(Sweden) Karlsson	12	7	11	11	11
(Czech Republic) Jančařík	10	11	7	6	5
(Croatia) Gacina	12	7	3	11	8	6
31	(Spain) Robles	10	11	11	7	11	11
(Austria) Gardos	11	6	12	7	11	11
(Belgium) Nuytinck	7	11	10	11	9	7
(Poland) Redzimski	11	11	3	11	5	9
(Japan) Yoshimura	9	13	11	8	11	11
(Qatar) Abdulwahhab	11	11	15	11
(New Zealand) Pena	5	2	13	1
(Egypt) Elbeiali	7	5	7	3
15	(Sweden) A. Källberg	11	11	11	11

Second round
1	(China) Lin S.	11	11	11	11
(Hong Kong) Lam	9	6	4	6
(Sweden) Karlsson	11	11	13	11
31	(Spain) Robles	7	8	11	9
(Austria) Gardos	5	6	5	8
(Japan) Yoshimura	11	11	11	11
(Qatar) Abdulwahhab	6	6	9	7
15	(Sweden) A. Källberg	11	11	11	11

Third round
1	(China) Lin S.	8	11	11	11	11
(Sweden) Karlsson	11	1	6	5	9
(Japan) Yoshimura	10	6	10	11
15	(Sweden) A. Källberg	12	11	12	13

Fourth round
1	(China) Lin S.	11	12	11	11
15	(Sweden) A. Källberg	6	10	7	6

==== Section 2 ====
First round
10	(Germany) Qiu	11	7	11	6	11	3	11
(Croatia) Zeljko	6	11	5	11	8	11	8
(Finland) Olah	7	6	11	8	5
(England) Jarvis	11	11	5	11	11
(Belgium) Allegro	9	11	11	11	11
(Qatar) Al-Kuwari	11	6	6	1	4
(Romania) Chirita	12	11	11	11
30	(Australia) Luu	10	3	8	7
23	(Egypt) O. Assar	11	9	11	11	11
(Croatia) Kojic	7	11	9	5	4
(Singapore) Pang	8	6	9	11	6
(Portugal) Freitas	11	11	11	9	11
(Portugal) Geraldo	14	11	11	15
(Slovenia) Kozul	12	5	5	13
(North Korea) Ham	12	6	12	3	8
5	(China) Liang Jk	14	11	10	11	11

Second round
10	(Germany) Qiu	9	9	8	11	11	11	8
(England) Jarvis	11	11	11	9	1	6	11
(Belgium) Allegro	3	4	9	6
(Romania) Chirita	11	11	11	11
23	(Egypt) O. Assar	11	8	12	3	8	11	10
(Portugal) Freitas	6	11	10	11	11	8	12
(Portugal) Geraldo	11	7	3	8	6
5	(China) Liang Jk	5	11	11	11	11

Third round
(England) Jarvis	11	14	12	11
(Romania) Chirita	9	12	10	7
(Portugal) Freitas	8	2	5	14
5	(China) Liang Jk	11	11	11	16

Fourth round
(England) Jarvis	11	8	9	11	2	6
5	(China) Liang Jk	8	11	11	5	11	11

==== Section 3 ====
First round
6	(France) F. Lebrun	11	11	11	11
(Slovakia) Pištej	7	5	9	8
(Portugal) Apolónia	6	11	7	6	11	6
(India) Shah	11	2	11	11	5	11
(Australia) Sareen	11	9	11	6	11	9	11
(New Zealand) Shu	8	11	3	11	5	11	9
(Ethiopia) Dufera	9	4	5	4
22	(South Korea) Oh	11	11	11	11
17	(South Korea) An	10	11	11	11	3	8	11
(Portugal) Monteiro	12	7	9	1	11	11	9
(Luxembourg) Mladenovic	11	12	11	11
(Chile) Gómez	4	10	6	9
(Slovakia) Arpas	7	7	12	4
(Chinese Taipei) Lin Y-C	11	11	14	11
(Togo) Fanny	6	2	1	6
9	(France) A. Lebrun	11	11	11	11

Second round
6	(France) F. Lebrun	11	11	11	11
(India) Shah	5	6	6	7
(Australia) Sareen	8	5	6	5
22	(South Korea) Oh	11	11	11	11
17	(South Korea) An	11	8	11	9	11	11
(Luxembourg) Mladenovic	5	11	9	11	9	8
(Chinese Taipei) Lin Y-C	w	/	o
9	(France) A. Lebrun

Third round
6	(France) F. Lebrun	11	9	9	11	11	11
22	(South Korea) Oh	5	11	11	4	9	5
17	(South Korea) An	11	7	11	5	7	11	16
(Chinese Taipei) Lin Y-C	7	11	5	11	11	7	14

Fourth round
6	(France) F. Lebrun	12	9	12	11	14	6	9
17	(South Korea) An	10	11	14	7	12	11	11

==== Section 4 ====
First round
14	(Germany) Duda	9	11	11	11	11
(Ecuador) Miño	11	4	6	9	6
(Romania) O. Ionescu	10	12	11	5	8	9
(Iran) N. Alamian	12	10	6	11	11	11
(Norway) Haug	11	11	12	10	8	11	11
(Paraguay) Aguirre	7	2	14	12	11	7	9
(Brazil) Ishiy	9	7	7	9
19	(Nigeria) Aruna	11	11	11	11
20	(Japan) Shinozuka	9	9	13	16	14	11
(China) Xue	11	11	11	14	12	4
(Singapore) Chew	10	9	7	8
(Kazakhstan) Gerassimenko	12	11	11	11
(Spain) Pérez	11	9	11	7	9	12	8
(Tunisia) Essid	5	11	6	11	11	10	11
(Mexico) Castro	8	11	3	4	4
3	(Brazil) Calderano	11	9	11	11	11

Second round
14	(Germany) Duda	11	11	11	11
(Iran) Alamian	7	6	6	3
(Norway) Haug	7	11	8	11	7	10
19	(Nigeria) Aruna	11	3	11	8	11	12
20	(Japan) Shinozuka	11	5	14	8	11	8
(Kazakhstan) Gerassimenko	4	11	12	11	13	11
(Tunisia) Essid	5	3	5	4
3	(Brazil) Calderano	11	11	11	11

Third round
14	(Germany) Duda	9	11	8	11	10	9
19	(Nigeria) Aruna	11	4	11	2	12	11
(Kazakhstan) Gerassimenko	11	11	5	10	9	7
3	(Brazil) Calderano	9	9	11	12	11	11

Fourth round
19	(Nigeria) Aruna	4	4	4	6
3	(Brazil) Calderano	11	11	11	11

=== Bottom half ===
==== Section 5 ====
First round
4	(Japan) T. Harimoto	11	11	11	14	11
(South Korea) Lim	7	6	1	16	3
(New Zealand) T. Choi	3	8	11	7	12
(India) Thakkar	11	11	6	11	14
(Chinese Taipei) Kuo	11	11	11	11
(Qatar) Korani	7	7	6	4
(Mexico) Madrid	2	2	5	2
27	(Japan) Togami	11	11	11	11
26	(United States) Jha	11	10	5	12	11	10	11
(Brazil) Teodoro	5	12	11	10	9	12	8
(Egypt) Ghallab	8	4	9	3
(Romania) E. Ionescu	11	11	11	11
(Australia) Bae	11	5	3	9	11	12
(Puerto Rico) Afanador	7	11	11	11	9	14
(Madagascar) Rakotoarimanana	4	10	6	4
11	(Slovenia) Jorgić	11	12	11	11

Second round
4	(Japan) T. Harimoto	13	11	9	11	9	11
(India) Thakkar	11	3	11	6	11	3
(Chinese Taipei) Kuo	3	8	6	6
27	(Japan) Togami	11	11	11	11
26	(United States) Jha	11	11	11	5	13	5	6
(Romania) E. Ionescu	6	7	8	11	15	11	11
(Puerto Rico) Afanador	8	8	12	6	6
11	(Slovenia) Jorgić	11	11	10	11	11

Third round
4	(Japan) T. Harimoto	7	9	11	5	9
27	(Japan) Togami	11	11	9	11	11
(Romania) E. Ionescu	9	7	2	6
11	(Slovenia) Jorgić	11	11	11	11

Fourth round
27	(Japan) Togami	9	11	9	11	1	12	12
11	(Slovenia) Jorgić	11	9	11	4	11	10	10

==== Section 6 ====
First round
12	(South Korea) Jang	11	11	11	6	10	11	11
(Chile) Burgos	4	8	13	11	12	3	8
(Slovakia) Y. Wang	16	9	11	11	11	8	8
(Iran) Faraji	18	11	8	6	8	11	11
(Belgium) Rassenfosse	11	6	12	11	12
(Nigeria) Adegoke	5	11	10	3	10
(Canada) E. Wang	13	11	10	9
32	(Germany) Walther	15	13	12	11
25	(Chinese Taipei) Kao	9	11	10	11	11	5	11
(France) Bardet	11	3	12	8	7	11	8
(Malaysia) Wong QS	3	10	7	9
(Greece) Gionis	11	12	11	11
(United States) S. Naresh	5	6	11	8	8
(Argentina) Sanchi	11	11	6	11	11
(Austria) Levenko	8	7	8	7
7	(Sweden) Möregårdh	11	11	11	11

Second round
12	(South Korea) Jang	11	11	11	15
(Iran) Faraji	4	8	7	13
(Belgium) Rassenfosse	11	11	8	11	11	10	11
32	(Germany) Walther	4	13	11	9	6	12	9
25	(Chinese Taipei) Kao	9	10	11	11	11	11
(Greece) Gionis	11	12	7	5	7	9
(Argentina) Sanchi	8	12	11	11	2	5
7	(Sweden) Möregårdh	11	10	13	6	11	11

Third round
12	(South Korea) Jang	11	5	11	13	11
(Belgium) Rassenfosse	7	11	5	11	9
25	(Chinese Taipei) Kao	11	8	7	15	4	3
7	(Sweden) Möregårdh	5	11	11	13	11	11

Fourth round
12	(South Korea) Jang	8	7	11	9	11	11	12
7	(Sweden) Möregårdh	11	11	7	11	3	7	14

==== Section 7 ====
First round
8	(Germany) Franziska	11	11	3	8	11	4	11
(Chinese Taipei) Liao	5	3	11	11	8	11	7
(Nigeria) Kuti	1	11	5	5
(Poland) Kulczycki	11	13	11	11
(Argentina) Lorenzo	12	8	2	11	12	11	3
(Sweden) Falck	14	11	11	2	10	7	11
(Australia) Lum	8	7	7	4
28	(South Korea) Cho	11	11	11	11
21	(Germany) Ovtcharov
(Austria) Habesohn	w	/	o
(Algeria) Bouloussa	8	7	3	10
(Japan) Matsudaira	11	11	11	12
(Croatia) Pucar	9	12	9	11	11	11	11
(Singapore) Quek	11	10	11	8	2	13	6
(United States) Js Liang	6	3	7	7
13	(Chinese Taipei) Lin Y.	11	11	11	11

Second round
8	(Germany) Franziska	11	12	11	11
(Poland) Kulczycki	6	10	8	7
(Sweden) Falck	9	11	11	11	7	8
28	(South Korea) Cho	11	7	6	13	11	11
(Austria) Habesohn	11	11	11	11
(Japan) Matsudaira	5	5	7	9
(Croatia) Pucar	10	11	11	7	11	7
13	(Chinese Taipei) Lin Y.	12	5	13	11	6	11

Third round
8	(Germany) Franziska	7	9	7	11	11	11	11
28	(South Korea) Cho	11	11	11	7	8	4	3
(Austria) Habesohn	8	8	8	10
13	(Chinese Taipei) Lin Y.	11	11	11	12

Fourth round
8	(Germany) Franziska	11	10	10	11	9	11	4
13	(Chinese Taipei) Lin Y.	8	12	12	7	11	7	11

==== Section 8 ====
First round
16	(China) Lin G.	6	11	11	6	11	11
(Egypt) Abdelaziz	11	2	8	11	7	6
(Argentina) Cifuentes	11	11	11	11
(Algeria) Jellouli	5	8	8	8
(France) Gauzy	11	11	11	11
(Egypt) M. Helmy	6	6	2	6
(Hong Kong) Chan	7	8	7	11	9
24	(Denmark) A. Lind	11	11	11	8	11
29	(France) Poret	11	11	11	11
(India) Gnanasekaran	5	6	7	6
(Hong Kong) Wong	11	11	11	11
(Canada) Ly	4	9	4	4
(Nigeria) Omotayo	10	7	8	12	5
(Brazil) Ilzuka	12	11	11	10	11
(United States) N. Naresh	6	4	2	4
2	(China) Wang C.	11	11	11	11

Second round
16	(China) Lin G.	11	11	11	13
(Argentina) Cifuentes	4	9	2	11
(France) Gauzy	11	11	4	9	3	12	15
24	(Denmark) A. Lind	6	5	11	11	11	10	13
29	(France) Poret	6	11	3	9	9
(Hong Kong) Wong	11	5	11	11	11
(Brazil) Ilzuka	3	3	5	4
2	(China) Wang C.	11	11	11	11

Third round
16	(China) Lin G.	11	8	11	9	11	3
(France) Gauzy	2	11	13	11	6	11
(Hong Kong) Wong	10	6	5	7
2	(China) Wang C.	12	11	11	11

Fourth round
(France) Gauzy	11	11	2	9	4	8
2	(China) Wang C.	9	9	11	11	11	11
