= 2025 World Table Tennis Championships – Men's doubles =

Men's doubles at the 2025 World Table Tennis Championships
- Venue: Lusail Sports Arena; Qatar University Sports Complex
- Location: Doha, Qatar
- Dates: 17–25 May

Medalists
gold medal	Hiroto Shinozuka; Shunsuke Togami	Japan
silver medal	Lin Yun-ju; Kao Cheng-jui	Chinese Taipei
bronze medal	Alexis Lebrun; Félix Lebrun	France
bronze medal	Esteban Dorr; Florian Bourrassaud	France

The men's doubles competition of the 2025 World Table Tennis Championships was held from 17 to 25 May 2025. The event was played as a straight knockout. All doubles' matches were best of 5 games.

The fifth seeds, Esteban Dorr and Florian Bourrassaud advanced to the semifinals. However, Dorr suffered a knee injury while celebrating, which forced the pair to withdraw from the semifinals. The other French duo, top-seeded Alexis Lebrun and Félix Lebrun, lost to Chinese Taipei's Lin Yun-ju and Kao Cheng-jui in the semifinals. Both French pairs earned bronze medals, making France's first podium appearance in individual events at the World Championships since 1997.

The second-seeded Japanese duo Hiroto Shinozuka and Shunsuke Togami advanced to the final via walkover and defeated Lin Yun-ju and Kao Cheng-jui in the deciding game, claiming Japan's first men's doubles title at the World Championships since 1961.

== Seeds ==
Doubles events had 16 seeded pairs. Seeding in doubles events was done by combining each player's ITTF Table Tennis Doubles/Mixed Doubles Individual World Ranking position to form a combined pair rank (CPR). The seeding was based on 29 April, 2025 CPR in ascending order.

1. (France) Alexis Lebrun / (France) Félix Lebrun (semifinals)
2. (Japan) Hiroto Shinozuka / (Japan) Shunsuke Togami (champions)
3. (China) Lin Gaoyuan / (China) Lin Shidong (quarterfinals)
4. (Japan) Harimoto Tomokazu / (Japan) Sora Matsushima (third round)
5. (France) Esteban Dorr / (France) Florian Bourrassaud (semifinals, withdrew)
6. (Chinese Taipei) Lin Yun-ju / (Chinese Taipei) Kao Cheng-jui (final)
7. (South Korea) An Jae-hyun / (South Korea) Lim Jong-hoon (second round)
8. (India) Manush Shah / (India) Manav Thakkar (second round)
9. (China) Huang Youzheng / (China) Liang Jingkun (third round)
10. (Singapore) Izaac Quek / (Singapore) Koen Pang (third round)
11. (Hong Kong) Wong Chun Ting / (Hong Kong) Baldwin Chan (third round)
12. (Argentina) Horacio Cifuentes / (Argentina) Santiago Lorenzo (second round)
13. (Brazil) Guilherme Teodoro / (Brazil) Vitor Ishiy (first round)
14. (Sweden) Kristian Karlsson / (Sweden) Mattias Falck (quarterfinals)
15. (Australia) Hwan Bae / (Australia) Aditya Sareen (second round)
16. (Singapore) Clarence Chew / (Singapore) Josh Chua (second round)

== Draw ==
The draw took place on 30 April 2025. Players of the same association were separated only in the first round. Since there were 62 pairs in men's doubles, the top two seeded pairs got a bye in the first round.

=== Key ===
- r = Retired
- w/o = Walkover

=== Finals ===
Semifinals							Final
1	(France) Alexis Lebrun (France) Felix Lebrun	8	7	11	10
6	(Chinese Taipei) Lin Yun-ju (Chinese Taipei) Kao Cheng-jui	11	11	9	12		6	(Chinese Taipei) Lin Yun-ju (Chinese Taipei) Kao Cheng-jui	11	5	11	6	6
5	(France) Esteban Dorr (France) Florian Bourrassaud						2	(Japan) Hiroto Shinozuka (Japan) Shunsuke Togami	6	11	7	11	11
2	(Japan) Hiroto Shinozuka (Japan) Shunsuke Togami	w		/		o

=== Top half ===
==== Section 1 ====
First round
1	(France) A. Lebrun (France) F. Lebrun	7	5	11	11	11
(Spain) Berzosa (Spain) Pérez	11	11	4	4	7
(Kazakhstan) Kenzhigulov (Kazakhstan) Zhubanov	15	11	11	9	8
(Iran) Faraji (Iran) Keshavarzi	13	13	5	11	11
(Mexico) Madrid (Mexico) Castro	8	9	5
(Sweden) A. Källberg (Sweden) Möregårdh	11	11	11
(Guatemala) Carrillo (Guatemala) Moscoso	2	3	2
12	(Argentina) Cifuentes (Argentina) Lorenzo	11	11	11
14	(Sweden) Karlsson (Sweden) Falck	11	14	13	11
(Madagascar) Razafinarivo (Madagascar) Rakotoarimanana	6	12	15	4
(Ecuador) Miño (Ecuador) Piguave	7	11	11	11
(Kazakhstan) Zakharov (Kazakhstan) Akimali	11	9	8	8
(Turkmenistan) Hamalambo (Turkmenistan) Banda	2	0	4
(Germany) Qiu (Germany) Duda	11	11	11
(Slovenia) Hribar (Slovenia) Kozul	7	8	6
8	(India) Shah (India) Thakkar	11	11	11

Second round
1	(France) A. Lebrun (France) F. Lebrun	11	11	11
(Iran) Faraji (Iran) Keshavarzi	4	5	0
(Sweden) A. Källberg (Sweden) Möregårdh	13	11	11	5	11
12	(Argentina) Cifuentes (Argentina) Lorenzo	15	2	8	11	6
14	(Sweden) Karlsson (Sweden) Falck	11	11	11
(Ecuador) Miño (Ecuador) Piguave	3	5	6
(Germany) Qiu (Germany) Duda	11	11	8	11
8	(India) Shah (India) Thakkar	5	9	11	5

Third round
1	(France) A. Lebrun (France) F. Lebrun	10	11	11	11
(Sweden) A. Källberg (Sweden) Möregårdh	12	5	3	5
14	(Sweden) Karlsson (Sweden) Falck	13	11	11	9	11
(Germany) Qiu (Germany) Duda	11	9	13	11	7

Quarterfinal
1	(France) A. Lebrun (France) F. Lebrun	11	11	8	11
14	(Sweden) Karlsson (Sweden) Falck	9	7	11	5

==== Section 2 ====
First round
6	(Chinese Taipei) Lin Y. (Chinese Taipei) Kao	11	4	11	11
(Italy) Mutti (Italy) Puppo	3	11	4	9
(Slovakia) Pistej (Slovakia) Zelinka	11	12	11
(Egypt) Ghallab (Egypt) M. Helmy	2	10	5
(Turkey) Yigenler (Turkey) Gunduz	10	6	11	9
(Croatia) Pucar (Slovenia) Jorgić	12	11	8	11
(Canada) Ly (Canada) Martin	4	3	6
9	(China) Huang (China) Liang Jk	11	11	11
13	(Brazil) Teodoro (Brazil) Ishiy	6	5	10
(Hungary) Lei (Slovakia) Arpas	11	11	12
(England) Green (England) Pitchford	8	7	6
(South Korea) Jang (South Korea) Cho	11	11	11
(Qatar) Al-Kuwari (Qatar) Abdulwahhab	11	11	6	8
(Romania) Chirița (Romania) E. Ionescu	13	8	11	11
(Italy) Rossi (Italy) Oyebode	5	7	7
3	(China) Lin G. (China) Lin S.	11	11	11

Second round
6	(Chinese Taipei) Lin Y. (Chinese Taipei) Kao	3	11	12	11
(Slovakia) Pistej (Slovakia) Zelinka	11	2	10	7
(Croatia) Pucar (Slovenia) Jorgić	7	7	12	12
9	(China) Huang (China) Liang Jk	11	11	10	14
(Hungary) Lei (Slovakia) Arpas	5	6	9
(South Korea) Jang (South Korea) Cho	11	11	11
(Romania) Chirița (Romania) E. Ionescu	6	6	10
3	(China) Lin G. (China) Lin S.	11	11	12

Third round
6	(Chinese Taipei) Lin Y. (Chinese Taipei) Kao	3	11	13	13	11
9	(China) Huang (China) Liang Jk	11	8	11	15	4
(South Korea) Jang (South Korea) Cho	5	9	9
3	(China) Lin G. (China) Lin S.	11	11	11

Quarterfinal
6	(Chinese Taipei) Lin Y. (Chinese Taipei) Kao	11	11	5	11
3	(China) Lin G. (China) Lin S.	5	9	11	8

=== Bottom Half ===
==== Section 3 ====
First round
4	(Japan) T. Harimoto (Japan) Matsushima	11	11	11
(New Caledonia) Dey (New Caledonia) Morisseau	4	5	1
(Austria) Gardos (Austria) Habesohn	11	11	12	9	11
(Belgium) Allegro (Belgium) Rassenfosse	13	7	10	11	7
(Chinese Taipei) Lin Y-c (Chinese Taipei) Kuo	8	7	11	6
(Romania) O. Ionescu (Spain) Robles	11	11	6	11
(Germany) Franziska (Germany) Ovtcharov	6	9	11
15	(Australia) Bae (Australia) Sareen	11	11	13
11	(Hong Kong) Wong CT (Hong Kong) Chan	11	11	11
(Nigeria) Adegoke (Nigeria) Abdulfatai	3	2	5
(Chile) Burgos (Chile) Gómez	11	11	11
(Nigeria) Kuti (Nigeria) Omotayo	8	7	9
(Austria) Kolodziejczyk (Moldova) Ursu	11	10	16	11
(India) Desai (India) Gnanaseksran	9	12	14	7
(Malaysia) Choong (Malaysia) Wong QS	10	6	11	11	2
5	(France) Dorr (France) Bourrassaud	12	11	9	6	11

Second round
4	(Japan) T. Harimoto (Japan) Matsushima	11	11	11
(Austria) Gardos (Austria) Habesohn	7	4	4
(Romania) O. Ionescu (Spain) Robles	11	11	8	11
15	(Australia) Bae (Australia) Sareen	5	2	11	5
11	(Hong Kong) Wong CT (Hong Kong) Chan	11	11	11
(Chile) Burgos (Chile) Gómez	5	7	6
(Austria) Kolodziejczyk (Moldova) Ursu	6	8	8
5	(France) Dorr (France) Bourrassaud	11	11	11

Third round
4	(Japan) T. Harimoto (Japan) Matsushima	11	12	11	9	9
(Romania) O. Ionescu (Spain) Robles	9	14	4	11	11
11	(Hong Kong) Wong CT (Hong Kong) Chan	6	8	7
5	(France) Dorr (France) Bourrassaud	11	11	11

Quarterfinal
(Romania) O. Ionescu (Spain) Robles	11	7	11	11	6
5	(France) Dorr (France) Bourrassaud	8	11	4	13	11

==== Section 4 ====
First round
7	(South Korea) An (South Korea) Lim	11	11	11
(Australia) Luu (Australia) Lum	7	9	9
(Switzerland) Rebetez (Switzerland) Vepa	12	14	4	9	5
(Egypt) Elbeiali (Egypt) Abdelaziz	10	12	11	11	11
(Slovakia) Y. Wang (Greece) Angelakis	11	11	11
(Saudi Arabia) Alkhadrawi (Saudi Arabia) Shulaybi	4	8	6
(Qatar) Al-Kuwari (Qatar) Shulaybi	3	7	4
16	(Singapore) Chew (Singapore) Chua	11	11	11
10	(Singapore) Quek (Singapore) Pang	12	11	12	13
(Denmark) Lind (Denmark) Anderson	14	8	10	11
(New Zealand) Shu (New Zealand) Choi	7	12	6
(Algeria) Bouloussa (Algeria) Jellouli	11	14	11
(United States) Js. Liang (United States) S. Naresh	11	6	13
(Hong Kong) Kwan (Hong Kong) Yiu	13	11	15
(Poland) Kulczycki (Poland) Redzimski	9	8	9
2	(Japan) Shinozuka (Japan) Togami	11	11	11

Second round
7	(South Korea) An (South Korea) Lim	10	10	8
(Egypt) Elbeiali (Egypt) Abdelaziz	12	12	11
(Slovakia) Y. Wang (Greece) Angelakis	13	3	6	12	11
16	(Singapore) Chew (Singapore) Chua	11	11	11	10	7
10	(Singapore) Quek (Singapore) Pang	11	11	11
(Algeria) Bouloussa (Algeria) Jellouli	9	2	8
(Hong Kong) Kwan (Hong Kong) Yiu	11	5	2	6
2	(Japan) Shinozuka (Japan) Togami	9	11	11	11

Third round
(Egypt) Elbeiali (Egypt) Abdelaziz	11	11	11
(Slovakia) Y. Wang (Greece) Angelakis	8	9	7
10	(Singapore) Quek (Singapore) Pang	6	11	11	8	7
2	(Japan) Shinozuka (Japan) Togami	11	2	7	11	11

Quarterfinal
(Egypt) Elbeiali (Egypt) Abdelaziz	10	3	5
2	(Japan) Shinozuka (Japan) Togami	12	11	11
