= Miyuu Kihara =

Japanese table tennis player

Personal information
- Born: 3 August 2004 (age 22) Akashi, Hyōgo, Japan
- Height: 164 cm (5 ft 5 in)

Sport
- Sport: Table tennis
- Club: Kinoshita Abyell Kanagawa (T.League)
- Playing style: Right-handed shakehand grip
- Highest ranking: 13 (26 July 2022)
- Current ranking: 19 (28 September 2026)
Medal record
Women's table tennis
Representing Japan
World Championships
Silver medal – second place	2022 Chengdu	Team
Silver medal – second place	2024 Busan	Team
Bronze medal – third place	2023 Durban	Doubles
Bronze medal – third place	2025 Doha	Doubles
World Cup
Bronze medal – third place	2023 Chengdu	Mixed team
WTT Cup Finals
Silver medal – second place	2023 Nagoya	Doubles
Asian Games
Silver medal – second place	2022 Hangzhou	Team
Bronze medal – third place	2022 Hangzhou	Doubles
Asian Championships
Silver medal – second place	2024 Astana	Doubles
Bronze medal – third place	2023 Pyeongchang	Doubles
Bronze medal – third place	2023 Pyeongchang	Team

Signature
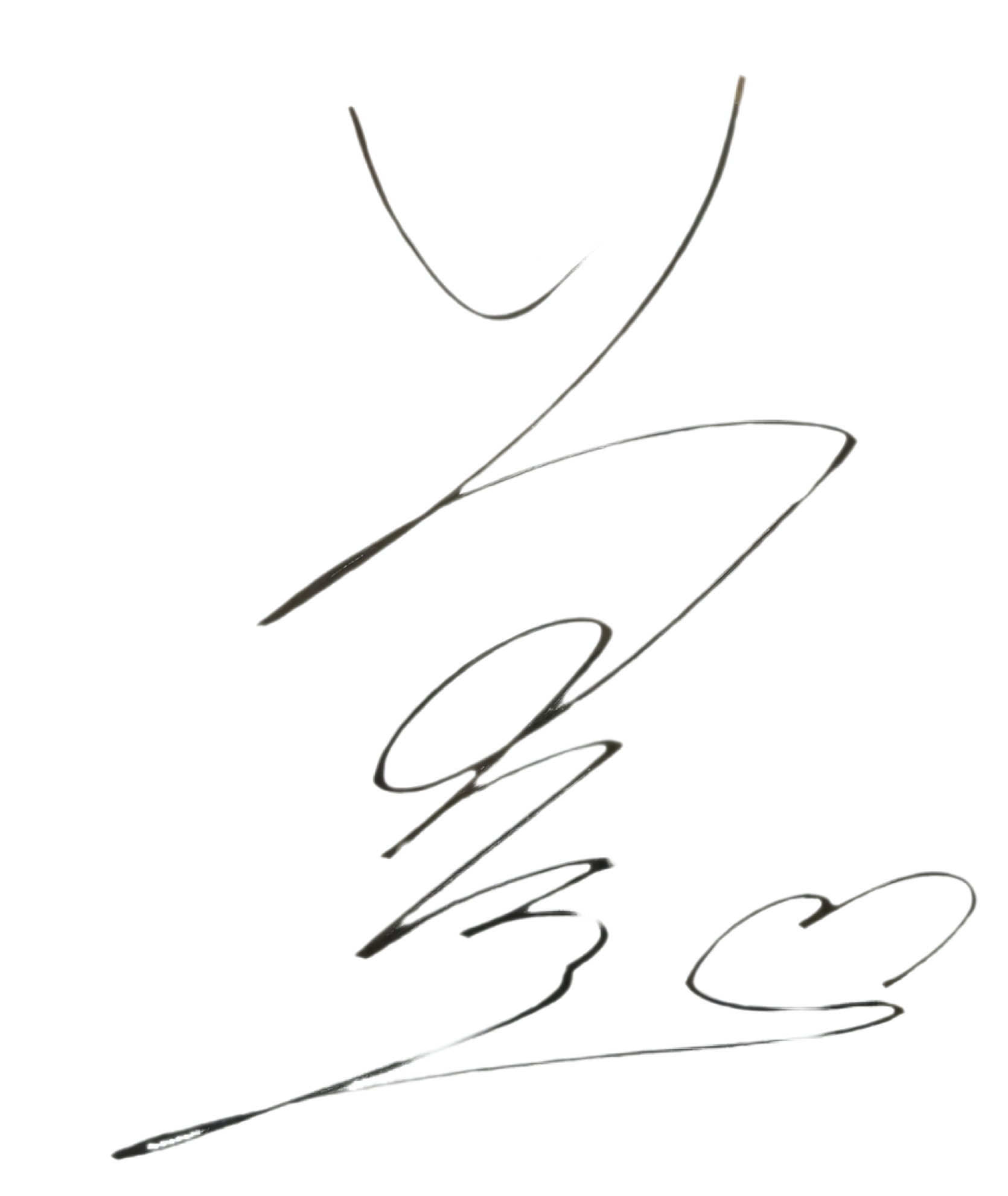

Miyuu Kihara (木原 美悠, Kihara Miyū; born 3 August 2004) is a Japanese table tennis player.

== Career highlights ==
In 2019, Kihara upset world No. 9 Miu Hirano and became the youngest finalist in singles at the All Japan National Championships. In May, at the age of 14 years and 278 days, Kihara won both the women's singles and doubles (with Miyu Nagasaki) at the Croatia Open. She was the youngest ever to win an international open tournament since the ITTF World Tour began in 1996. Kihara and Nagasaki continued to capture doubles titles, including the ITTF World Tour Grand Finals in December.

Kihara advanced to the semifinals at WTT inaugural event, the WTT Contender Doha 2021, before losing to Hina Hayata. In 2022, Kihara won the singles title at WTT Star Contender Doha by defeating Han Ying in the final. She became a member of the Japanese women's team, winning silver at the 2022 World Team Championships. She also claimed the U-19 singles title at the ITTF World Youth Championships.

== Finals ==
=== Women's singles ===
Result	Year	Tournament	Opponent	Score	Ref
Winner	2019	ITTF Challenge, Croatia Open	(Japan) Miyu Kato	4–3	
Winner	2022	WTT Star Contender Doha	(Germany) Han Ying	4–3	
Runner-up	2025	WTT Star Contender Doha	(China) Kuai Man	0–4	
Runner-up	2025	WTT Star Contender Ljubljana	(Japan) Miyu Nagasaki	1–4	
Winner	2025	WTT Star Contender Muscat	(South Korea) Joo Cheon-hui	4–1	
Winner	2026	WTT Star Contender Astana	(Japan) Hitomi Sato	4–3	

=== Women's doubles ===
Result	Year	Tournament	Partner	Opponents	Score	Ref
Runner-up	2018	ITTF Challenge, Slovenia Open	Miyu Nagasaki	(Hong Kong) Ng Wing Nam / Minnie Soo	1–3	
Winner	2019	ITTF Challenge, Slovenia Open	Miyu Nagasaki	(Japan) Satsuki Odo / Saki Shibata	3–0	
Winner	2019	ITTF Challenge, Croatia Open	Miyu Nagasaki	(Japan) Honoka Hashimoto / Hitomi Sato	3–2	
Runner-up	2019	ITTF World Tour, German Open	Miyu Nagasaki	(South Korea) Jeon Ji-hee / Yang Ha-eun	1–3	
Winner	2019	ITTF World Tour, Austrian Open	Miyu Nagasaki	(Chinese Taipei) Chen Szu-yu / Cheng Hsien-tzu	3–2	
Winner	2019	ITTF World Tour Grand Finals	Miyu Nagasaki	(South Korea) Jeon Ji-hee / Yang Ha-eun	3–0	
Winner	2022	WTT Contender Doha	Miyu Nagasaki	(Chinese Taipei) Chen Szu-yu / Huang Yi-hua	3–0	
Winner	2022	WTT Star Contender Doha	Miyu Nagasaki	(Chinese Taipei) Li Yu-jhun / Cheng I-ching	3–0	
Runner-up	2023	WTT Contender Tunis	Miwa Harimoto	(India) Sutirtha Mukherjee / Ayhika Mukherjee	1–3	
Runner-up	2023	WTT Finals	Miyu Nagasaki	(China) Wang Manyu / Sun Yingsha	1–3	
Winner	2024	WTT Star Contender Ljubljana	Miyu Nagasaki	(South Korea) Jeon Ji-hee / Joo Cheon-hui	3–1	
Runner-up	2024	Asian Championships	Miwa Harimoto	(Japan) Satsuki Odo / Sakura Yokoi	2–3	
Winner	2025	WTT Star Contender Chennai	Miwa Harimoto	(South Korea) Shin Yu-bin / Ryu Han-na	3–2	
Winner	2025	WTT Contender Tunis	Miwa Harimoto	(Japan) Satsuki Odo / Sakura Yokoi	3–1	
Winner	2026	WTT Contender Almaty	Miu Hirano	(India) Syndrela Das / Sutirtha Mukherjee	3–0	
Winner	2026	WTT Contender Panagyurishte	Miu Hirano	(Italy) Nicole Arlia / Gaia Monfardini	3–0	
Winner	2026	WTT Star Contender Astana	Miu Hirano	(Japan) Honoka Hashimoto / (Puerto Rico) Adriana Díaz	3–1	

=== Mixed doubles ===
Result	Year	Tournament	Partner	Opponents	Score	Ref
Winner	2026	WTT Contender Skopje	Hiromu Kobayashi	(France) Esteban Dorr / (Puerto Rico) Adriana Díaz	3–0	
Runner-up	2026	WTT Star Contender Astana	Hiromu Kobayashi	(China) Chen Junsong / Wang Yidi	0–3	
