= 2026 European Table Tennis Championships – Men's doubles =

Men's doubles at the 2026 European Table Tennis Championships
- Venue: Arena Stožice
- Location: Ljubljana, Slovenia
- Dates: 13–18 October
- Competitors: 63 pairs

Medalists
gold medal	(France) Félix Lebrun (France) Alexis Lebrun
silver medal	(Sweden) Kristian Karlsson (Sweden) Anton Källberg
bronze medal	(France) Esteban Dorr (France) Florian Bourrassaud
bronze medal	(Moldova) Vladislav Ursu (Moldova) Andrei Putuntica

The men's doubles competition of the 2026 European Table Tennis Championships is being held from 13 to 18 October 2026.

== Format ==
The men's doubles competition features a two-stage qualification.

=== Stage 1: Qualification Knockout Stage ===
- Eligibility: All pairs seeded 17 and beyond compete in this stage.
- Match Length: Best-of-5 games.

=== Stage 2: Main Draw ===
- Composition:
  - The top 16 seeded pairs
  - The 16 qualification group winners.
- Match Length: Best-of-5 games.

== Seeds ==
- Seeding was determined by the ITTF World Ranking (Doubles Individual) released on 5 October 2026.
1. (France) Félix Lebrun / (France) Alexis Lebrun
2. (Germany) Dang Qiu / (Germany) Benedikt Duda
3. (France) Esteban Dorr / (France) Florian Bourrassaud
4. (Belgium) Adrien Rassenfosse / (Belgium) Martin Allegro
5. (Romania) Darius Movileanu / (Romania) Eduard Ionescu
6. (Sweden) Kristian Karlsson / (Sweden) Anton Källberg
7. (Turkey) Abdullah Yigenler / (Turkey) Ibrahim Gunduz
8. (Germany) Wim Verdonschot / (Germany) André Bertelsmeier
9. (Spain) Juan Perez / (Spain) Daniel Berzosa
10. (Slovenia) Deni Kozul / (Slovenia) Darko Jorgić
11. (Slovakia) Jakub Zelinka / (Slovakia) Ľubomír Pištej
12. (Individual Neutral Athletes) Evgeny Tikhonov / (Individual Neutral Athletes) Vladimir Sidorenko
13. (England) Tom Jarvis / (England) Connor Green
14. (Portugal) Marcos Freitas / (Portugal) Tiago Apolonia
15. (Croatia) Andrej Gaćina / (Croatia) Ivor Ban
16. (Romania) Andrei Istrate / (Romania) Iulian Chiriță

== Main draw ==
=== Final ===
Final
1	(France) F. Lebrun (France) A. Lebrun (gold)	3
6	(Sweden) Karlsson (Sweden) Källberg (silver)	2

=== Upper Half ===
Round of 32
1	(France) F. Lebrun (France) A. Lebrun	3
(Hungary) Szantosi (Netherlands) De Boer	0
(Hungary) Szudi (Hungary) Andras	2
10	(Slovenia) Kozul (Slovenia) Jorgić	3
9	(Spain) Perez (Spain) Berzosa	2
(Czech Republic) Brhel (Croatia) Benko	3
(Finland) Olah (Finland) Naumi	3
5	(Romania) Movileanu (Romania) Ionescu	2
7	(Turkey) Yigenler (Turkey) Gunduz	2
(Serbia) Peto (Serbia) Ninkovic	3
(Turkey) Yilmaz (Turkey) Ocal	0
11	(Slovakia) Zelinka (Slovakia) Pištej	3
16	(Romania) Istrate (Romania) Chiriță	0
(Sweden) Möregårdh (Sweden) Ranefur	3
(Netherlands) Kahn (Netherlands) Camara	0
3	(France) Dorr (France) Bourrassaud	3

Round of 16
1	(France) F. Lebrun (France) A. Lebrun	3
10	(Slovenia) Kozul (Slovenia) Jorgić	0
(Czech Republic) Brhel (Croatia) Benko	1
(Finland) Olah (Finland) Naumi	3
(Serbia) Peto (Serbia) Ninkovic	3
11	(Slovakia) Zelinka (Slovakia) Pištej	2
(Sweden) Möregårdh (Sweden) Ranefur	1
3	(France) Dorr (France) Bourrassaud	3

Quarterfinals
1	(France) F. Lebrun (France) A. Lebrun	3
(Finland) Olah (Finland) Naumi	2
(Serbia) Peto (Serbia) Ninkovic	0
3	(France) Dorr (France) Bourrassaud	3

Semifinals
1	(France) F. Lebrun (France) A. Lebrun	3
3	(France) Dorr (France) Bourrassaud (bronze)	0

=== Lower Half ===
Round of 32
4	(Belgium) Rassenfosse (Belgium) Allegro	3
(Austria) Kolodziejczyk (Austria) Gardos	0
(Denmark) Rasmussen (Denmark) Andersen	2
15	(Croatia) Gaćina (Croatia) Ban	3
13	(England) Jarvis (England) Green	0
(Moldova) Ursu (Moldova) Putuntica	3
(Portugal) Abiodun (Poland) Zalewski	2
8	(Germany) Verdonschot (Germany) Bertelsmeier	3
6	(Sweden) Karlsson (Sweden) Källberg	3
(Spain) Lillo (Spain) De Las Heras	1
(Luxembourg) Van Dessel (Luxembourg) Mladenovic	1
14	(Portugal) Freitas (Portugal) Apolonia	3
12	(Individual Neutral Athletes) Tikhonov (Individual Neutral Athletes) Sidorenko	3
(Norway) Lam (Norway) Haug	0
(Individual Neutral Athletes) Shutov (Individual Neutral Athletes) Kunats	0
2	(Germany) Qiu (Germany) Duda	3

Round of 16
4	(Belgium) Rassenfosse (Belgium) Allegro	3
15	(Croatia) Gaćina (Croatia) Ban	2
(Moldova) Ursu (Moldova) Putuntica	3
8	(Germany) Verdonschot (Germany) Bertelsmeier	2
6	(Sweden) Karlsson (Sweden) Källberg	3
14	(Portugal) Freitas (Portugal) Apolonia	1
12	(Individual Neutral Athletes) Tikhonov (Individual Neutral Athletes) Sidorenko	2
2	(Germany) Qiu (Germany) Duda	3

Quarterfinals
4	(Belgium) Rassenfosse (Belgium) Allegro	0
(Moldova) Ursu (Moldova) Putuntica	3
6	(Sweden) Karlsson (Sweden) Källberg	3
2	(Germany) Qiu (Germany) Duda	2

Semifinals
(Moldova) Ursu (Moldova) Putuntica (bronze)	0
6	(Sweden) Karlsson (Sweden) Källberg	3
