= 2025 World Table Tennis Championships =

2025 edition of the World Table Tennis Championships

- Venue: Lusail Sports Arena; Qatar University Sports Complex
- Location: Doha, Qatar
- Dates: 17–25 May

The 2025 World Table Tennis Championships was the 58th edition of World Table Tennis Championships, held in Doha, Qatar from 17 to 25 May 2025. Doha secured the bid over Alicante, Spain, during the 2022 ITTF Summit. This marked the second time Qatar hosted the tournament, the previous occasion being the team event in 2004. The Lusail Sports Arena served as the main venue, while the Qatar University Sports Complex was used as the secondary venue for the first four days of the competition.

A total of 353 Players from 69 member associations were registered for the tournament. The singles events followed a best-of-seven, single-elimination format, while the doubles events used a best-of-five, single-elimination format.

China's Wang Chuqin and Sun Yingsha clinched their third consecutive mixed doubles title. On the following day, Wang and Sun went on to win the men's singles and women's singles titles, respectively. Hiroto Shinozuka and Shunsuke Togami claimed Japan's first men's doubles title at the World Championships since 1961. The tournament concluded with the Chinese duo Wang Manyu and Kuai Man winning the women's doubles title.

== Schedule ==
The tournament was played over nine days.

Rounds in draw
Finals

Date	17 May	18 May	19 May	20 May	21 May	22 May	23 May	24 May	25 May
Men's singles	R128		R64	R64+R32	R32	R16	QF	SF	F
Women's singles	R128		R64	R64+R32	R32	R16	QF	SF	F
Men's doubles	R64		R32	R16		QF		SF	F
Women's doubles	R64		R32	R16		QF		SF	F
Mixed doubles	R64		R32	R16	QF		SF	F	

== Medal summary ==
=== Medal table ===
Rank	Nation	Gold	Silver	Bronze	Total
1	China	4	1	2	7
2	Japan	1	1	2	4
3	Brazil	0	1	0	1
3	Chinese Taipei	0	1	0	1
5	Austria	0	0.5	0	0.5
5	Romania	0	0.5	0	0.5
7	France	0	0	2	2
7	South Korea	0	0	2	2
9	Hong Kong	0	0	1	1
9	Sweden	0	0	1	1
Totals (10 entries)		5	5	10	20

=== Medalists ===
Event	Gold	Silver	Bronze
Men's singles	(China) Wang Chuqin	(Brazil) Hugo Calderano	(China) Liang Jingkun
Men's singles	(China) Wang Chuqin	(Brazil) Hugo Calderano	(Sweden) Truls Möregårdh
Women's singles	(China) Sun Yingsha	(China) Wang Manyu	(Japan) Mima Ito
Women's singles	(China) Sun Yingsha	(China) Wang Manyu	(China) Chen Xingtong
Men's doubles	(Japan) Hiroto Shinozuka (Japan) Shunsuke Togami	(Chinese Taipei) Lin Yun-ju (Chinese Taipei) Kao Cheng-jui	(France) Alexis Lebrun (France) Félix Lebrun
Men's doubles	(Japan) Hiroto Shinozuka (Japan) Shunsuke Togami	(Chinese Taipei) Lin Yun-ju (Chinese Taipei) Kao Cheng-jui	(France) Esteban Dorr (France) Florian Bourrassaud
Women's doubles	(China) Wang Manyu (China) Kuai Man	(Austria) Sofia Polcanova (Romania) Bernadette Szőcs	(South Korea) Shin Yu-bin (South Korea) Ryu Han-na
Women's doubles	(China) Wang Manyu (China) Kuai Man	(Austria) Sofia Polcanova (Romania) Bernadette Szőcs	(Japan) Miwa Harimoto (Japan) Miyuu Kihara
Mixed doubles	(China) Wang Chuqin (China) Sun Yingsha	(Japan) Maharu Yoshimura (Japan) Satsuki Odo	(South Korea) Lim Jong-hoon (South Korea) Shin Yu-bin
Mixed doubles	(China) Wang Chuqin (China) Sun Yingsha	(Japan) Maharu Yoshimura (Japan) Satsuki Odo	(Hong Kong) Wong Chun Ting (Hong Kong) Doo Hoi Kem
