= Juan Pérez =

Juan Pérez may refer to:

== Arts and entertainment ==
- Juan Pérez de Gijón (before 1440—after 1500), Spanish Renaissance composer
- Juan Pérez de Montalbán (1602–1638), Spanish dramatist, poet and novelist
- Juan Pérez Roldán (1604–1672), Spanish composer
- Juan Antonio Pérez Bonalde (1846–1892), Venezuelan poet
- Juan Pérez Floristán (born 1993), Spanish pianist
- Juan Pérez, title character in 2011 Mexican comedy film Saving Private Perez

== Nobility and explorers ==
- Juan Pérez de Guzmán (1240–1285), Spanish nobleman
- Juan Alonso Pérez de Guzmán, 6th Duke of Medina Sidonia (1502–1558), Spanish duke
- Juan Pérez de Zurita (1516–c. 1595), Spanish conquistador
- Juan José Pérez Hernández (c. 1725–1775), Spanish explorer

== Politics and law ==
- Juan Pérez-Caballero y Ferrer (1861–1951), Spanish politician
- Juan Pablo Pérez Alfonzo (1903–1979), Venezuelan politician
- Juan Pérez-Giménez (1941–2020), American jurist in Puerto Rico
- Juan Pérez Alsina (born 1954), Argentine politician
- Juan Perez (American politician) (born 1956), mayor of Sheboygan, Wisconsin
- Juan Carlos Pérez Góngora (born 1960), Mexican politician and lawyer
- Juan Pérez Medina (born 1960), Mexican politician and educator
- Juan Alberto Pérez, Chilean politician
- Juan Ignacio Pérez, acting governor of Texas

== Religion ==
- Juan Pérez (friar) (before 1460—before 1513), Spanish Franciscan and companion of Christopher Columbus
- Juan Pérez de Espinosa (1558–1622), Spanish priest
- Juan Pérez Bocanegra (before 1570—1645), Spanish priest
- Juan Pérez de la Serna (1573–1631), seventh Archbishop of Mexico

== Sports ==
=== Association football (soccer) ===
- Juan Carlos Pérez (born 1972), Ecuadorian footballer
- Juan Pérez (footballer, born 1980), Panamanian defensive midfielder
- Juan Manuel Pérez Bernal (born 1985), Mexican footballer known as "Kichi"
- Juan David Pérez (born 1991), Colombian footballer
- Juan Manuel Pérez (born 1993), Argentine footballer
- Juan Pérez (footballer, born 1996), Spanish goalkeeper
- Juan José Pérez (born 2004), Colombian midfielder

=== Other sports ===
- Juan Pérez (cyclist) (born 1932), Chilean Olympic cyclist
- Juan Carlos Pérez (pitcher) (born 1969), Cuban baseball player
- Juan Pérez (handballer) (born 1974), Spanish Olympic handball medalist in 1996 and 2000
- Juan Andrés Pérez (born 1975), Uruguayan rugby union hooker
- Juan Pérez (pitcher) (born 1978), Dominican in Major League Baseball
- Juan Carlos Pérez (sport shooter) (born 1981), Bolivian trap shooter in 2012 Olympics
- Juan Pérez (outfielder) (born 1986), Dominican in Major League Baseball
- Juan Ignacio Pérez (sailor), Mexican sailor

== Others ==
- Juan Vicente Pérez (1909–2024), Venezuelan supercentenarian
- Juan Pérez de la Riva (1913–1976), Cuban historian
- Juan Antonio Pérez López (1934–1996), Spanish business theorist

== Other uses ==
- Juan Perez Sound, ocean inlet in British Columbia, Canada named after the explorer
- Juan Pablo Pérez Alfonzo Airport, Venezuelan airport named after the politician
- In Spanish language, the name is also often used to refer to a hypothetical "everyman" in other contexts, like John Doe or John Q. Public
