= Florian Bourrassaud =

French table tennis player (born 2000)

Personal information
- Nationality: French
- Born: 22 March 2000 (age 26)

Sport
- Sport: Table tennis
- Playing style: Right-handed, shakehand grip
- Highest ranking: 112 (21 September 2026)
- Current ranking: 113 (2 November 2026)
Medal record
Men's table tennis
Representing France
World Championships
| Bronze medal – third place | 2025 Doha | Doubles |
European Championships
| Bronze medal – third place | 2026 Ljubljana | Doubles |

Florian Bourrassaud (born 22 March 2000) is a French table tennis player. He and his partner, Esteban Dorr, won a bronze medal at the 2025 World Table Tennis Championships, marking France's first World Table Tennis Championships medal since 1997.

== Career ==
Bourrassaud represented France at the 2025 World Table Tennis Championships and won a bronze medal in the doubles event, along with Esteban Dorr. After defeating Ovidiu Ionescu and Álvaro Robles in the quarterfinals, Dorr suffered a knee injury while celebrating their victory, as a result, they had to withdraw from the semifinals. This was France's first medal at the World Table Tennis Championships since 1997.
