= Kao Cheng-jui =

Taiwanese table tennis player

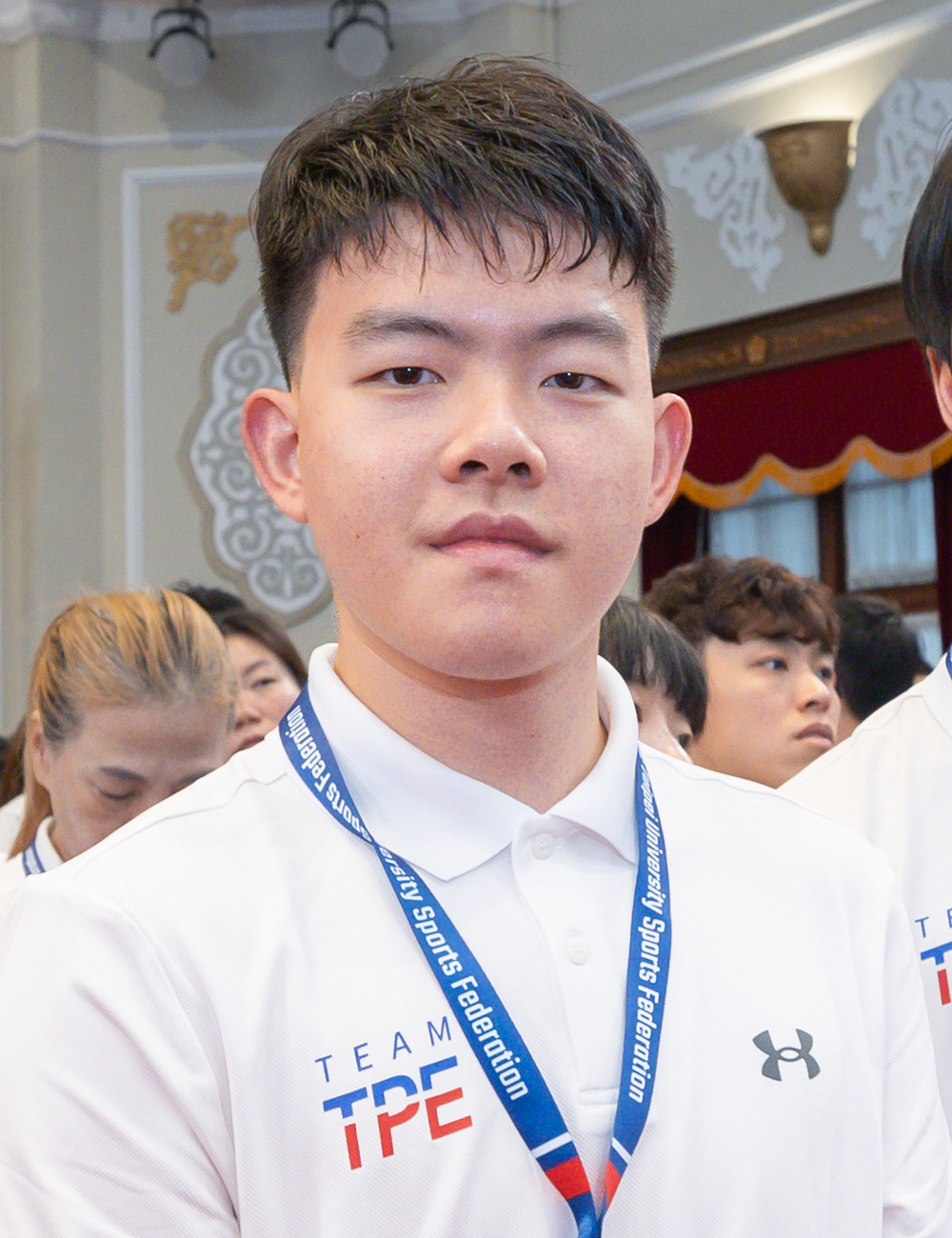

Personal information
- Native name: 高承睿
- Nickname: Yuzu
- Born: 25 December 2004 (age 21) Taipei, Taiwan

Sport
- Sport: Table tennis
- Club: TTC RhönSprudel Fulda-Maberzell (Bundesliga)
- Playing style: Right-handed shakehand grip
- Highest ranking: 21 (11 February 2025)
- Current ranking: 25 (15 July 2025)
Medal record
Men's table tennis
Representing Chinese Taipei
World Championships
| Silver medal – second place | 2025 Doha | Doubles |
| Bronze medal – third place | 2024 Busan | Team |
Asian Championships
| Silver medal – second place | 2023 Pyeongchang | Team |
| Silver medal – second place | 2024 Astana | Team |
World University Games
| Gold medal – first place | 2025 Rhine-Ruhr | Team |

Kao Cheng-jui (Chinese: 高承睿; pinyin: Gāo Chéngruì; born 25 December 2004) is a Taiwanese table tennis player.

== Career ==
Kao was born in Taipei and began practicing table tennis in kindergarten. After graduating from elementary school, he moved to Kaohsiung to train at Chuang Chih-yuan's table tennis academy. In 2022, he won the silver medal in the U19 singles event at the Asian Youth Table Tennis Championships. In 2023, he reached men's singles final at the WTT Contender Lima, where he was defeated 1–4 by Marcos Freitas, finishing as the runner-up. Kao was also selected for the national team in the same year to participate in the 2023 Asian Championships, helping the men's team win a silver medal in the team event.

In 2024, Kao helped the Chinese Taipei men's team defeat Germany in the quarterfinals of the World Table Tennis Championships, advancing to the semifinals and tying the team's best historical result. That same year, he qualified for the Paris Olympics as the second-highest-ranked Taiwanese male player. He reached the round of 16 in the men's singles at the Paris Olympics, where he was defeated by Truls Möregårdh. Alongside Lin Yun-ju and Chuang Chih-yuan, his men's team also exited in the quarterfinals. After the Olympics, Kao joined TTC RhönSprudel Fulda-Maberzell and began competing in the Bundesliga.

== Personal life ==
Kao is a student at the National Taiwan Sport University. Due to his resemblance to Yuzuhiko, a character from the anime Atashin'chi, Taiwanese fans have nicknamed him "Yuzu," which is transliterated as yòuzi (Chinese: 柚子), meaning "pomelo" in Taiwan.
