= Shunsuke Togami =

Japanese table tennis player

Personal information
- Born: 24 August 2001 (age 25) Mie, Japan
- Height: 170 cm (5 ft 7 in)

Sport
- Sport: Table tennis
- Club: TTF Liebherr Ochsenhausen (Bundesliga)
- Playing style: Right-handed shakehand grip
- Highest ranking: 13 (14 September 2026)
- Current ranking: 16 (2 November 2026)
Medal record
Men's table tennis
Representing Japan
World Championships
Gold medal – first place	2025 Doha	Doubles
Silver medal – second place	2026 London	Team
Bronze medal – third place	2021 Houston	Doubles
Bronze medal – third place	2022 Chengdu	Team
World Cup
Silver medal – second place	2025 Chengdu	Mixed team
Bronze medal – third place	2023 Chengdu	Mixed team
Asian Games
Gold medal – first place	2026 Aichi-Nagoya	Team
Bronze medal – third place	2026 Aichi-Nagoya	Doubles
Asian Championships
Gold medal – first place	2021 Doha	Doubles
Gold medal – first place	2021 Doha	Mixed doubles
Bronze medal – third place	2019 Yogyakarta	Doubles
Bronze medal – third place	2021 Doha	Singles
Bronze medal – third place	2021 Doha	Team
Bronze medal – third place	2024 Astana	Doubles
Bronze medal – third place	2025 Bhubaneswar	Team
Asian Cup
Bronze medal – third place	2026 Haikou	Singles

Shunsuke Togami (戸上 隼輔, Togami Shunsuke; born 24 August 2001) is a Japanese table tennis player.

== Career ==
At the 2021 Asian Table Tennis Championships, he won bronze in both the men's singles and men's team events. He also won gold in both the men's doubles and mixed doubles events. Togami won the 2022 Japan Championships, beating Kenta Matsudaira in the final 4–2.

== Teams ==
- T.T Saitama (2018–2020)
- Ryukyu Asteeda (2020–2022)
- TTF Liebherr Ochsenhausen (2022–2023, 2024–)
- Kinoshita Meister Tokyo (2023–2024)

== Singles titles ==
Year	Tournament	Final opponent	Score	Ref
2025	WTT Contender Almaty	(China) Zhou Qihao	4–2	
2026	WTT Star Contender Ljubljana	(Brazil) Hugo Calderano	4–3	
2026	WTT Contender Almaty	(France) Simon Gauzy	4–0	
2026	WTT Star Contender Muscat	(Japan) Park Ganghyeon	4–1	
