= Yuan Wan =

German table tennis player

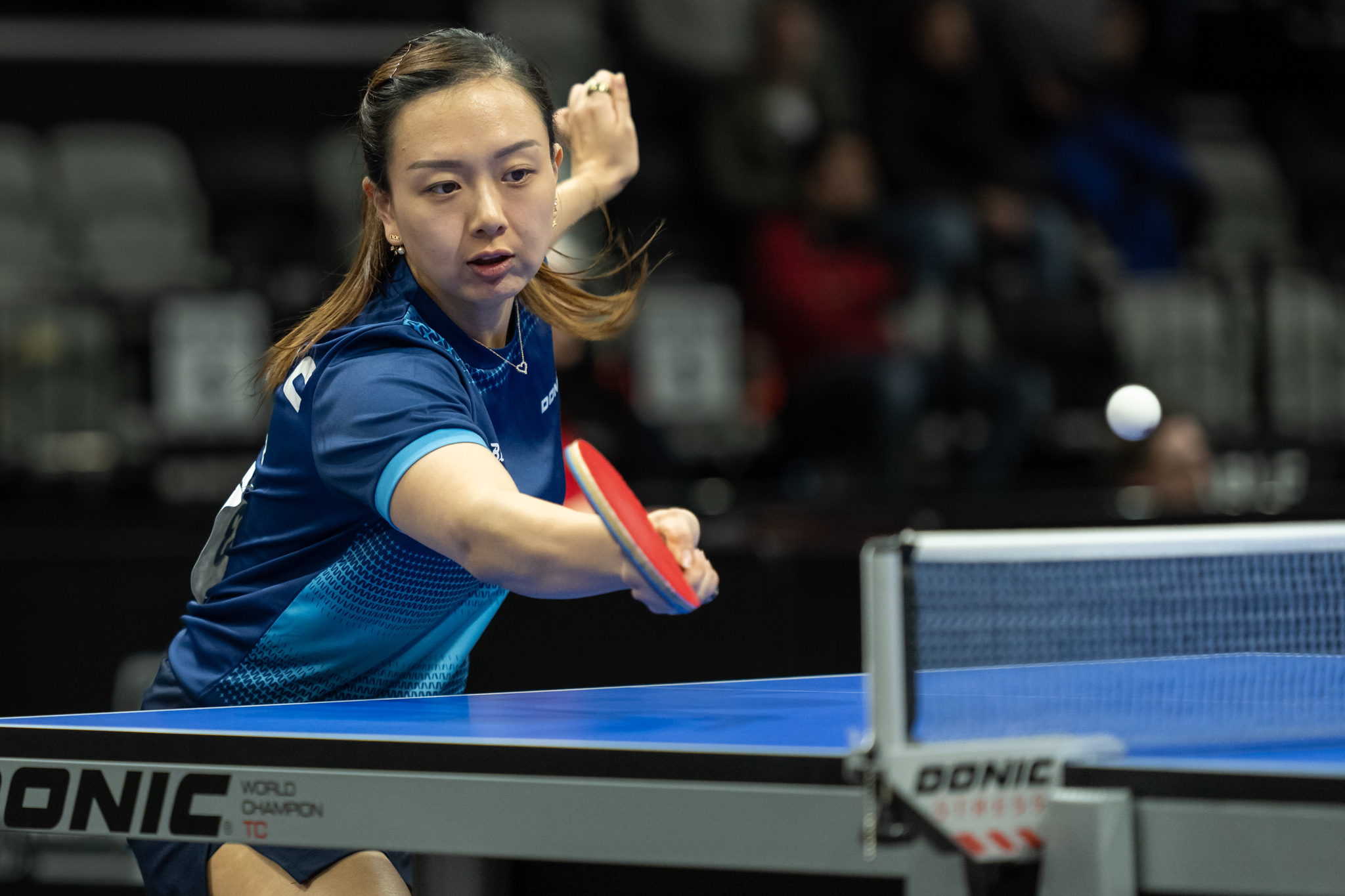
- Yuan Wan (2023)

Personal information
- Nationality: German
- Born: 23 May 1997 (age 29)

Sport
- Sport: Table tennis
- Playing style: Right-handed, shakehand grip
- Highest ranking: 59 (April 1, 2025)
- Current ranking: 62 (15 July 2025)
Medal record
Women's table tennis
Representing Germany
World Championships
Bronze medal – third place	2026 London	Team
European Championships
Gold medal – first place	2025 Zadar	Team

Yuan Wan (Chinese: 万远; Pinyin: Wàn Yuǎn; born 23 May 1997) is a German table tennis player. As of May 27, 2025, Her highest career ITTF ranking was 59. As of December 2025, she is married to Swedish table tennis player Anton Källberg.
