= Esteban Dorr =

French table tennis player (born 2000)

Personal information
- Nationality: French
- Born: 11 March 2000 (age 26)
- Height: 176 cm (5 ft 9 in)

Sport
- Sport: Table tennis
- Club: Nîmes/Montpellier Alliance (Pro A)
- Playing style: Left-handed, shakehand grip
- Highest ranking: 95 (13 May 2025)
- Current ranking: 121 (21 September 2026)
Medal record
Men's table tennis
Representing France
World Championships
Bronze medal – third place	2025 Doha	Doubles
European Championships
Bronze medal – third place	2026 Ljubljana	Doubles

Esteban Dorr (born 11 March 2000) is a French table tennis player. He and his partner, Florian Bourrassaud, won a bronze medal at the 2025 World Table Tennis Championships, marking France's first World Table Tennis Championships medal since 1997.

== Career ==
Dorr represented France at the 2025 World Table Tennis Championships and won a bronze medal in the doubles event, along with Florian Bourrassaud. After defeating Ovidiu Ionescu and Álvaro Robles in the quarterfinals, Dorr suffered a knee injury while celebrating their victory, as a result, they had to withdraw from the semifinals. This was France's first medal at the World Table Tennis Championships since 1997. As of 11 February 2025, he and his partner, Bourrassaud, achieved a career-best world ranking of No. 3 in men's doubles.
