= Kristian Karlsson =

Swedish table tennis player (born 1991)

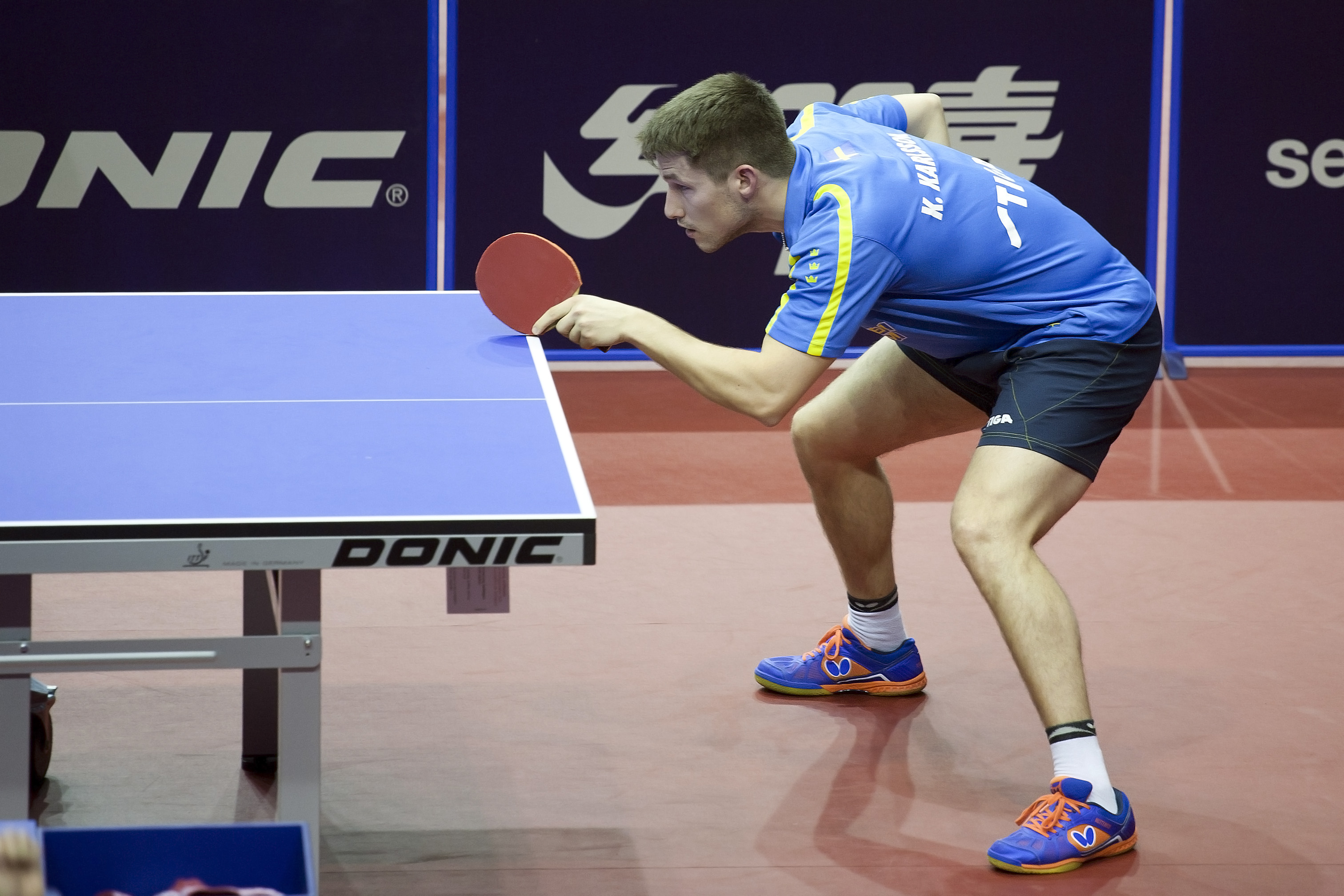
- Karlsson at the 2017 German Open

Personal information
- Full name: Kristian Gunnar Karlsson
- Born: 6 August 1991 (age 35) Trollhättan, Sweden
- Height: 1.83 m (6 ft 0 in)

Sport
- Sport: Table tennis
- Club: GV Hennebont TT
- Playing style: Left-handed shakehand
- Highest ranking: 15 (3 May 2022)
- Current ranking: 44 (5 October 2026)
Medal record
Men's table tennis
Representing Sweden
Olympic Games
Silver medal – second place	2024 Paris	Team
World Championships
Gold medal – first place	2021 Houston	Doubles
Bronze medal – third place	2018 Halmstad	Team
European Games
Silver medal – second place	2019 Minsk	Team
Silver medal – second place	2023 Kraków–Małopolska	Team
European Championships
Gold medal – first place	2022 Munich	Doubles
Gold medal – first place	2023 Malmö	Team
Silver medal – second place	2012 Herning	Doubles
Silver medal – second place	2018 Alicante	Doubles
Silver medal – second place	2026 Ljubljana	Doubles
Bronze medal – third place	2014 Lisbon	Team
Bronze medal – third place	2015 Yekaterinburg	Doubles
Bronze medal – third place	2016 Budapest	Doubles
Bronze medal – third place	2018 Alicante	Singles
Bronze medal – third place	2019 Nantes	Team
Bronze medal – third place	2022 Munich	Singles
Bronze medal – third place	2024 Linz	Doubles
Bronze medal – third place	2026 Ljubljana	Mixed doubles

Kristian Gunnar Karlsson (Swedish pronunciation: [ˈkrɪ̌sːtɪjan ˈkɑ̌ːɭsɔn]; Born 6 August 1991) is a Swedish professional table tennis player.

== Career ==
Born in Trollhättan, Västra Götaland, Karlsson started to play table tennis in his hometown club at the age of 8. He remained in Trollhättan until he was 16, subsequently he moved away from home to go to high school. During his high school years, Karlsson had 10 training sessions a week.

In 2011, he signed to Halmstad BTK and began to rise through the ranks quickly. Ranked outside the top 400 in October 2010, Karlsson finished 2011 in the 233rd position, and at the end of 2012 he ranked 129th. The year 2012 also marked his first senior success, winning the silver medal at the 2012 Table Tennis European Championships in men's doubles.

His performances also attracted French top division side AS Pontoise-Cergy TT and Karlsson eventually signed to the club in September 2013. He won the Champions League with AS Pontoise-Cergy in 2014.

In 2016, Karlsson signed for the German top club Borussia Düsseldorf. After coming second in the Champions League and winning the German Cup, Karlsson and Borussia Düsseldorf went on to win the triple in 2018.

Paired with Mattias Karlsson, Karlsson won a bronze medal in men's doubles at the 2016 European Table Tennis Championships.

And in the 2018 European Table Tennis Championships, again paired with Mattias Karlsson, Kristian won a silver medal in the men's doubles as well as a bronze medal in the men's singles. During 2018 Karlsson and the Swedish National Team won a Bronze medal (Team) in the 2018 World Team Table Tennis Championships in Halmstad, and also a gold medal in the Swedish Championship in Helsingborg.

=== 2021 ===
In March, Karlsson played in WTT Doha. In the first WTT Contender event, he made it to the round of 16, where he lost to Mattias Falck. In the second, WTT Star Contender event, Karlsson upset Liam Pitchford in a deuce-in-the-fifth thriller in the round of 32.

Karlsson & Mattias Falck won the world championship in men's doubles at the 2021 World Table Tennis Championships becoming the first Swedish duo to win gold since 1991.

=== 2022 ===
On 19 July 2022, he agreed on terms with Greek club Panathinaikos.
