= Álvaro Robles (table tennis) =

Spanish table tennis player

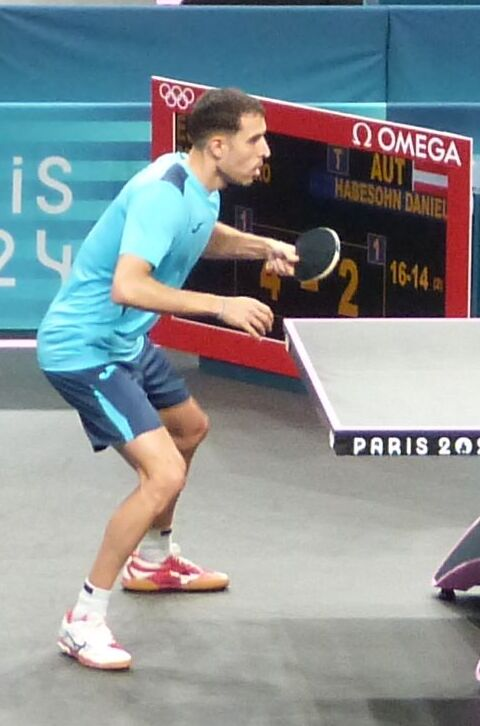

Personal information
- Full name: Álvaro Robles Martínez
- Born: 29 April 1991 (age 35) Huelva, Spain
- Height: 1.88 m (6 ft 2 in)
- Weight: 79 kg (174 lb)

Sport
- Sport: Table tennis
- Club: TTF Liebherr Ochsenhausen (Bundesliga)
- Playing style: Left-handed shakehand
- Highest ranking: 37 (January 2018)
- Current ranking: 55 (5 October 2026)
Medal record
Men's table tennis
Representing Spain
World Championships
Silver medal – second place	2019 Budapest	Doubles
European Championships
Gold medal – first place	2024 Linz	Mixed doubles
Mediterranean Games
Gold medal – first place	2022 Oran	Singles

Álvaro Robles Martínez (born 29 April 1991) is a Spanish table tennis player. He won a silver medal in men's doubles at the 2019 World Table Tennis Championships.
