= WTT Contender Taiyuan 2026 =

Table tennis tournament in China

Tournament details
- Dates: 7–12 April
- Edition: 4th
- Total prize money: US$100,000
- Venue: Taiyuan Binhe Sports Center
- Location: Taiyuan, China

Champions
- Men's singles: (China) Wen Ruibo
- Women's singles: (Japan) Satsuki Odo
- Men's doubles: (China) Li Hechen (China) Wen Ruibo
- Women's doubles: (China) Shi Xunyao (China) Han Feier
- Mixed doubles: (China) Huang Youzheng (China) Shi Xunyao

The WTT Contender Taiyuan 2026 was a table tennis tournament that took place at the Taiyuan Binhe Sports Center, Taiyuan, China, from 7 to 12 April and had a total prize of US$100,000.

== Tournament ==
The WTT Contender Taiyuan 2026 was the eight tournament of the 2026 WTT Series and was part of the WTT Contender event.

=== Venue ===
This tournament was held at the Taiyuan Binhe Sports Center in Taiyuan, China.

=== Point distribution ===
Below is the point distribution table for each phase of the tournament based on the WTT World Ranking for the WTT Contender event.

Event	Winner	Finalist	Semi-finalist	Quarter-finalist	Round of 16	Round of 32
Singles	400	280	180	120	30	4
Doubles	400	280	180	45	4	—

=== Prize pool ===
The total prize money is US$100,000 with the distribution of the prize money in accordance with WTT regulations.

Event	Winner	Finalist	Semi-finalist	Quarter-finalist	Round of 16	Round of 32
Singles	$5,000	$2,500	$1,275	$1,025	$825	$650
Doubles	$2,500	$1,500	$950	$550	$350	—

== Men's singles ==
=== Seeds ===
1. (China) Xiang Peng (first round)
2. (China) Wen Ruibo (champion)
3. (China) Chen Yuanyu (second round)
4. (Japan) Yukiya Uda (quarter-finals)
5. (Croatia) Tomislav Pucar (semi-finals)
6. (Japan) Hiroto Shinozuka (quarter-finals)
7. (Australia) Nicholas Lum (first round)
8. (Japan) Yuta Tanaka (second roundd)

=== Finals ===
Semi-finals
5	(Croatia) Tomislav Pucar	11	7	9	8
Q	(Japan) Maharu Yoshimura	3	11	11	11
WC	(China) Li Tianyang	8	11	12	11	6
2	(China) Wen Ruibo	11	6	14	8	11

Final
Q	(Japan) Maharu Yoshimura	11	8	11	6	4	2
2	(China) Wen Ruibo	7	11	6	11	11	11

=== Top half ===
==== Section 1 ====
First round
1	(China) Xiang P	6	5	8
(Luxembourg) L Mladenovic	11	11	11
(Sweden) K Karlsson	11	11	11
(Australia) H Bae	7	5	3
WC	(Japan) R Yoshiyama	12	9	9	11	9
(China) Huang YZ	10	11	11	8	11
(Germany) C Meissner	10	7	10
5	(Croatia) T Pucar	12	11	12

Second round
(Luxembourg) L Mladenovic	11	1	9	8
(Sweden) K Karlsson	7	11	11	11
(China) Huang YZ	11	3	4	12	8
5	(Croatia) T Pucar	7	11	11	10	11

Quarter-finals
(Sweden) K Karlsson	11	4	14	8	5
5	(Croatia) T Pucar	7	11	12	11	11

==== Section 2 ====
First round
4	(Japan) Y Uda	10	11	11	9	11
(Hong Kong) Lam S H	12	6	8	11	8
WC	(China) Sun Y	11	11	11
(Hong Kong) Yiu K T	8	9	8
(Hong Kong) B Chan	8	11	9	7
Q	(Japan) M Yoshimura	11	5	11	11
(Singapore) I Quek	11	11	14
7	(Australia) N Lum	4	9	12

Second round
4	(Japan) Y Uda	12	11	17
WC	(China) Sun Y	10	5	15
Q	(Japan) M Yoshimura	7	13	11	14
(Singapore) I Quek	11	11	1	12

Quarter-finals
4	(Japan) Y Uda	10	11	8	11	5
Q	(Japan) M Yoshimura	12	2	11	9	11

=== Bottom half ===
==== Section 3 ====
First round
8	(Japan) Y Tanaka	11	11	11
Q	(Hong Kong) Ho K K	5	1	6
(Malaysia) Wong Q S	4	9	7
Q	(Japan) Y Sakai	11	11	11
Q	(Japan) S Aida	11	11	9	6	7
WC	(China) Li TY	9	8	11	11	11
(Hong Kong) Wong C T	6	14	6	11	4
3	(China) Chen YY	11	12	11	8	11

Second round
8	(Japan) Y Tanaka	10	11	7	7
Q	(Japan) Y Sakai	12	6	11	11
WC	(China) Li TY	11	11	12
3	(China) Chen YY	7	9	10

Quarter-finals
Q	(Japan) Y Sakai	7	6	7
WC	(China) Li TY	11	11	11

==== Section 4 ====
First round
6	(Japan) H Shinozuka	11	11	8	11
Q	(Hong Kong) Kwan M H	7	7	11	7
Q	(China) Li HC	11	0	9	11	12
(Japan) K Yoshimura	6	11	11	6	10
Q	(Singapore) K Pang	7	8	11	7
(United States) Ma J	11	11	8	11
Q	(Singapore) J Chua	8	7	10
2	(China) Wen RB	11	11	12

Second round
6	(Japan) H Shinozuka	11	11	11
Q	(China) Li HC	8	8	7
(United States) Ma J	9	4	6
2	(China) Wen RB	11	11	11

Quarter-finals
6	(Japan) H Shinozuka	11	6	2	4
2	(China) Wen RB	4	11	11	11

== Women's singles ==
=== Seeds ===
1. (Japan) Satsuki Odo (champion)
2. (China) Shi Xunyao (semi-finals)
3. (Japan) Honoka Hashimoto (semi-finals)
4. (Japan) Miyu Nagasaki (first round)
5. (Japan) Hitomi Sato (final)
6. (Japan) Miyuu Kihara (first round)
7. (Japan) Sakura Yokoi (quarter-finals)
8. (Singapore) Zeng Jian (first round)

=== Finals ===
Semi-finals
1	(Japan) Satsuki Odo	11	11	11
3/WC	(Japan) Honoka Hashimoto	3	3	2
5	(Japan) Hitomi Sato	11	11	11
2	(China) Shi Xunyao	5	6	7

Final
1	(Japan) Satsuki Odo	11	11	3	13	11
5	(Japan) Hitomi Sato	5	9	11	11	6

=== Top half ===
==== Section 1 ====
First round
1	(Japan) S Odo	13	12	11
(Hong Kong) Doo H K	11	10	6
(Hong Kong) Su T T	11	11	11
(Australia) J Wu	5	3	7
Q	(China) Yang HZ	11	11	11
(Hong Kong) Lam Y L	8	8	7
Q	(Netherlands) S Men	3	4	5
7	(Japan) S Yokoi	11	11	11

Second round
1	(Japan) S Odo	11	11	8	11
(Hong Kong) Su T T	5	4	11	0
Q	(China) Yang HZ	11	4	9	11	4
7	(Japan) S Yokoi	9	11	11	7	11

Quarter-finals
1	(Japan) S Odo	11	11	11	10	11
7	(Japan) S Yokoi	10	8	13	12	6

==== Section 2 ====
First round
3/WC	(Japan) H Hashimoto	11	11	13
Q	(South Korea) Kim E-s	7	2	11
Q	(China) Feng YX	11	5	9	4
(China) Yao RX	7	11	11	11
(Japan) M Hirano	11	11	11
(Portugal) F Yu	5	6	5
(India) M Batra	11	10	14	9	11
6	(Japan) M Kihara	8	12	12	11	7

Second round
3/WC	(Japan) H Hashimoto	11	11	11
(China) Yao RX	3	4	7
(Japan) M Hirano	11	11	11
(India) M Batra	9	7	8

Quarter-finals
3/WC	(Japan) H Hashimoto	11	11	11
(Japan) M Hirano	6	1	6

=== Bottom half ===
==== Section 3 ====
First round
5	(Japan) H Sato	11	14	11
Q	(Japan) M Takamori	4	12	4
Q	(Malaysia) Tee A X	0	4	7
(China) Han FE	11	11	11
(Hong Kong) Ng W L	8	3	11	8
WC	(Japan) S Shibata	11	11	7	11
WC	(China) Zhu ZY	14	11	11
4	(Japan) M Nagasaki	12	8	2

Second round
5	(Japan) H Sato	11	11	11
(China) Han FE	7	6	7
WC	(Japan) S Shibata	8	10	11	8
WC	(China) Zhu ZY	11	12	9	11

Quarter-finals
5	(Japan) H Sato	11	11	11
WC	(China) Zhu ZY	3	8	7

==== Section 4 ====
First round
8	(Singapore) Zeng J	8	9	4
Q	(Netherlands) J Li	11	11	11
(Singapore) Ser L Q	11	5	7	4
(China) Qin YX	9	11	11	11
Q	(Hong Kong) Lee H M	8	11	9	9
(China) Zong GM	11	8	11	11
WC	(Luxembourg) X L Ni	8	8	7
2	(China) Shi XY	11	11	11

Second round
Q	(Netherlands) J Li	8	10	11	11	11
(China) Qin YX	11	12	4	3	13
(China) Zong GM	12	7	4	6
2	(China) Shi XY	10	11	11	11

Quarter-finals
(China) Qin YX	7	12	9	7
2	(China) Shi XY	11	10	11	11

== Men's doubles ==
=== Seeds ===
1. (China) Lin Shidong / (China) Huang Youzheng (final)
2. (Hong Kong) Wong Chun-ting / (Hong Kong) Baldwin Chan (quarter-finals)
3. (Singapore) Izaac Quek / (Singapore) Koen Pang (first round)
4. (China) Li Hechen / (China) Wen Ruibo (champions)

=== Finals ===
Semi-finals
1	(China) Lin Shidong (China) Huang Youzheng	11	11	6	11
(China) Chen Yuanyu (China) Xiang Peng	6	8	11	5
4	(China) Li Hechen (China) Wen Ruibo	11	11	8	11
(Japan) Maharu Yoshimura (Japan) Kazuhiro Yoshimura	9	4	11	6

Final
1	(China) Lin Shidong (China) Huang Youzheng	10	12	7	11	8
4	(China) Li Hechen (China) Wen Ruibo	12	10	11	8	11

=== Top half ===
First round
1	(China) Lin SD (China) Huang YZ	11	11	11
WC	(China) Sun Y (China) Li TY	6	5	7
(Japan) Y Sakai (Japan) S Aida	11	9	11	9	11
(Australia) N Lum (Australia) H Bae	6	11	6	11	3
3	(Singapore) I Quek (Singapore) K Pang	11	3	9	11	11
(China) Chen YY (China) Xiang P	8	11	11	7	13
(Malaysia) Wong Q S (Malaysia) J Choong	12	12	11	11
(France) R Ruiz (Singapore) J Chua	10	14	5	8

Quarter-finals
1	(China) Lin SD (China) Huang YZ	9	11	11	14
(Japan) Y Sakai (Japan) S Aida	11	3	7	12
(China) Chen YY (China) Xiang P	9	12	11	13
(Malaysia) Wong Q S (Malaysia) J Choong	11	10	4	11

Semi-finals
1	(China) Lin SD (China) Huang YZ	11	11	6	11
(China) Chen YY (China) Xiang P	6	8	11	5

=== Bottom half ===
First round
(Thailand) N Mekamporn (Thailand) P Saelee	12	8	9
(Hong Kong) Ho K K (Hong Kong) Li H M	14	11	11
(Germany) C Meissner (United States) Ma J	9	12	11	4	9
4	(China) Li HC (China) Wen RB	11	10	8	11	11
(Hong Kong) Yiu K T (Hong Kong) Lam S H	9	6	11	11	6
(Japan) M Yoshimura (Japan) K Yoshimura	11	11	8	7	11
(South Korea) Woo H-g (South Korea) Choi J-w	9	12	6	5
2	(Hong Kong) Wong C T (Hong Kong) B Chan	11	10	11	11

Quarter-finals
(Hong Kong) Ho K K (Hong Kong) Li H M	6	4	8
4	(China) Li HC (China) Wen RB	11	11	11
(Japan) M Yoshimura (Japan) K Yoshimura	11	13	11
2	(Hong Kong) Wong C T (Hong Kong) B Chan	8	11	6

Semi-finals
4	(China) Li HC (China) Wen RB	11	11	8	11
(Japan) M Yoshimura (Japan) K Yoshimura	9	4	11	6

== Women's doubles ==
=== Seeds ===
1. (Japan) Satsuki Odo / (Japan) Sakura Yokoi (quarter-finals)
2. (China) Qin Yuxuan / (China) Zong Geman (quarter-finals)
3. (Hong Kong) Doo Hoi Kem / (Hong Kong) Ng Wing Lam (final)
4. (China) Shi Xunyao / (China) Han Feier (champions)

=== Finals ===
Semi-finals
(Hong Kong) Su Tsz Tung (Hong Kong) Wong Hoi Tung	9	4	11	10
4	(China) Shi Xunyao (China) Han Feier	11	11	8	12
3	(Hong Kong) Doo Hoi Kem (Hong Kong) Ng Wing Lam	11	11	7	13
(Japan) Saki Shibata (Japan) Mao Takamori	7	8	11	11

Final
4	(China) Shi Xunyao (China) Han Feier	11	11	6	12
3	(Hong Kong) Doo Hoi Kem (Hong Kong) Ng Wing Lam	6	4	11	10

=== Top half ===
First round
(Hong Kong) Su T T (Hong Kong) Wong H T	11	11	12
(Australia) J Wu (South Korea) Kim E-s	6	7	10
4	(China) Shi XY (China) Han FE	11	11	3	11
(Hong Kong) Lee H M (Hong Kong) Kong T L	7	9	11	6
(Malaysia) Chang L S (Malaysia) Li Y I	4	10	6
(Japan) M Kihara (Japan) M Hirano	11	12	11

Quarter-finals
1	(Japan) S Odo (Japan) S Yokoi	11	11	9	2	6
(Hong Kong) Su T T (Hong Kong) Wong H T	6	6	11	11	11
4	(China) Shi XY (China) Han FE	4	11	11	11
(Japan) M Kihara (Japan) M Hirano	11	9	2	7

Semi-finals
(Hong Kong) Su T T (Hong Kong) Wong H T	9	4	11	10
4	(China) Shi XY (China) Han FE	11	11	8	12

=== Bottom half ===
First round
(Malaysia) K Lyne (Malaysia) Tee A X	12	6	7	9
(Singapore) Zeng J (Singapore) Ser L Q	10	11	11	11
(Netherlands) J Li (Netherlands) S Men	11	8	11	9	6
3	(Hong Kong) Doo H K (Hong Kong) Ng W L	9	11	8	11	11
(Japan) S Shibata (Japan) M Takamori	8	7	11	11	11
(China) Yao RX (China) Jiang YY	11	11	9	2	7

Quarter-finals
(Singapore) Zeng J (Singapore) Ser L Q	16	5	4	11	10
3	(Hong Kong) Doo H K (Hong Kong) Ng W L	14	11	11	9	12
(Japan) S Shibata (Japan) M Takamori	7	11	11	11
2	(China) Qin YX (China) Zong GM	11	7	8	2

Semi-finals
3	(Hong Kong) Doo H K (Hong Kong) Ng W L	11	11	7	13
(Japan) S Shibata (Japan) M Takamori	7	8	11	11

== Mixed doubles ==
=== Seeds ===
1. (Hong Kong) Wong Chun-ting / (Hong Kong) Doo Hoi Kem (final)
2. (China) Huang Youzheng / (China) Shi Xunyao (champions)
3. (Japan) Satoshi Aida / (Japan) Hitomi Sato (quarter-finals)
4. (Singapore) Koen Pang / (Singapore) Zeng Jian (semi-finals)

=== Finals ===
Semi-finals
1	(Hong Kong) Wong Chun Ting (Hong Kong) Doo Hoi Kem	11	11	8	11
4	(Singapore) Koen Pang (Singapore) Zeng Jian	9	7	11	6
(Japan) Yuhi Sakai (Japan) Mao Takamori	4	3	11	8
2	(China) Huang Youzheng (China) Shi Xunyao	11	11	7	11

Final
1	(Hong Kong) Wong Chun Ting (Hong Kong) Doo Hoi Kem	7	9	11	7
2	(China) Huang Youzheng (China) Shi Xunyao	11	11	6	11

=== Top half ===
First round
1	(Hong Kong) Wong C T (Hong Kong) Doo H K	9	11	11	11
Q	(Luxembourg) L Mladenovic (Luxembourg) X L Ni	11	8	7	5
(China) Li HC (China) Yao RX	11	12	9	7	15
Q	(Germany) C Meissner (Hong Kong) Lee H M	6	10	11	11	17
4	(Singapore) K Pang (Singapore) Zeng J	11	13	11
(Singapore) I Quek (Singapore) Ser L Q	8	11	8
(Malaysia) Wong Q S (Malaysia) Tee A X	11	5	11	11
(Malaysia) J Choong (Malaysia) K Lyne	7	11	7	5

Quarter-finals
1	(Hong Kong) Wong C T (Hong Kong) Doo H K	11	11	9	11
(Germany) C Meissner (Hong Kong) Lee H M	4	5	11	9
4	(Singapore) K Pang (Singapore) Zeng J	11	11	8	11
(Malaysia) Wong Q S (Malaysia) Tee A X	9	8	11	5

Semi-finals
1	(Hong Kong) Wong C T (Hong Kong) Doo H K	11	11	8	11
4	(Singapore) K Pang (Singapore) Zeng J	9	7	11	6

=== Bottom half ===
First round
WC	(China) Chen YY (China) Qin YX	9	8	8
(Japan) Y Sakai (Japan) M Takamori	11	11	11
Q	(South Korea) Choi J-w (South Korea) Kim E-s	9	4	6
3	(Japan) S Aida (Japan) H Sato	11	11	11
(Hong Kong) Yiu K T (Hong Kong) Ng W L	11	12	11
Q	(Australia) N Lum (Hong Kong) Lam Y L	7	10	8
WC	(China) Wen RB (China) Zong GM	6	9	4
2	(China) Huang YZ (China) Shi XY	11	11	11

Quarter-finals
(Japan) Y Sakai (Japan) M Takamori	13	7	15	11
3	(Japan) S Aida (Japan) H Sato	11	11	13	8
(Hong Kong) Yiu K T (Hong Kong) Ng W L	5	11	11	9	8
2	(China) Huang YZ (China) Shi XY	11	8	6	11	11

Semi-finals
(Japan) Y Sakai (Japan) M Takamori	4	3	11	8
2	(China) Huang YZ (China) Shi XY	11	11	7	11

Preceded by WTT Contender Tunis 2026	2026 WTT Series	Succeeded by WTT Contender Lagos 2026
