= 2019 Croatia Open (table tennis) =

Tournament details
- Dates: 16–18 May 2019
- Competitors: 64MS/64WS/16MD/16WD/16XD
- Total prize money: US$30,000
- Location: Zagreb, Croatia

Champions
- Men's singles: (Sweden) Anton Kallberg
- Women's singles: (Japan) Miyuu Kihara
- Men's doubles: (Japan) Shunsuke Togami (Japan) Yukiya Uda
- Women's doubles: (Japan) Miyuu Kihara (Japan) Miyu Nagasaki

The 2019 Croatia Open is the sixth event of the 2019 ITTF Challenge Series. It took place from 16 to 18 May in Zagreb, Croatia.

== Men's singles ==
=== Seeds ===
1. (Chinese Taipei) Chuang Chih-yuan (semi-finals)
2. (Sweden) Kristian Karlsson (final)
3. (United States) Kanak Jha (third round)
4. (Brazil) Gustavo Tsuboi (second round)
5. (Slovenia) Darko Jorgic (third round)
6. (Germany) Benedikt Duda (quarter-finals)
7. (Japan) Masataka Morizono (third round)
8. (Slovakia) Lubomir Pistej (first round)
9. (Croatia) Tomislav Pucar (semi-finals)
10. (Russia) Alexander Shibaev (second round)
11. (France) Can Akkuzu (third round)
12. (Brazil) Eric Jouti (first round)
13. (Russia) Kirill Skachkov (quarter-finals)
14. (Paraguay) Marcelo Aguirre (second round)
15. (France) Quentin Robinot (first round)
16. (Croatia) Andrej Gacina (first round)
17. (Mexico) Marcos Madrid (first round)
18. (Belgium) Florent Lambiet (third round)
19. (Brazil) Thiago Monteiro (second round)
20. (Belarus) Aliaksandr Khanin (second round)
21. (Japan) Yukiya Uda (third round)
22. (Belgium) Robin Devos (quarter-finals)
23. (Germany) Dang Qiu (first round)
24. (Slovenia) Deni Kozul (second round)
25. (Argentina) Horacio Cifuentes (first round)
26. (Belgium) Martin Allegro (second round)
27. (Croatia) Frane Tomislav Kojic (first round)
28. (Belarus) Pavel Platonov (first round)
29. (Austria) Andreas Levenko (first round)
30. (Puerto Rico) Brian Afanador (second round)
31. (Russia) Alexey Liventsov (first round)
32. (Sweden) Anton Kallberg (champion)

=== Draw ===
==== Finals ====
Semifinals
1	(Chinese Taipei) Chuang Chih-Yuan	3	11	3	11	11	11	5
32	(Sweden) Anton Kallberg	11	4	11	4	13	6	11
9	(Croatia) Tomislav Pucar	9	11	10	7	5
2	(Sweden) Kristian Karlsson	11	8	12	11	11

Final
32	(Sweden) Anton Kallberg	11	11	12	8	11
2	(Sweden) Kristian Karlsson	8	8	10	11	4

==== Top half ====
===== Section 1 =====
First round
1	(Chinese Taipei) Chuang C-y	8	14	11	11	11
(India) R Bhanja	11	12	5	6	7
(France) J Rolland	5	11	2	11	11	11
27	(Croatia) F Kojic	11	9	11	6	6	8
29	(Austria) A Levenko	5	11	7	5	8
(Croatia) Wei SH	11	4	11	11	11
(Chile) J Lamadrid	7	3	6	3
10	(Russia) A Shibaev	11	11	11	11
12	(Brazil) E Jouti	5	8	9	4
(Japan) S Togami	11	11	11	11
(India) M Thakkar	6	9	10	11
24	(Slovenia) D Kozul	11	11	12	13
28	(Belarus) P Platonov	11	7	11	7	7	9
(Russia) M Paikov	10	11	8	11	11	11
(Sweden) T Moregard	6	7	10	11	5
7	(Japan) M Morizono	11	11	12	8	11

Second round
1	(Chinese Taipei) Chuang C-y	11	11	11	10	11
(France) J Rolland	6	9	5	12	8
(Croatia) Wei SH	11	12	9	11	11
10	(Russia) A Shibaev	3	10	11	9	4
(Japan) S Togami	11	3	8	11	11	11
24	(Slovenia) D Kozul	3	11	11	4	8	5
(Russia) M Paikov	4	11	6	11	8	6
7	(Japan) M Morizono	11	7	11	5	11	11

Third round
1	(Chinese Taipei) Chuang C-y	5	11	11	11	6	7	11
(Croatia) Wei SH	11	7	4	3	11	11	8
(Japan) S Togami	6	14	11	11	11
7	(Japan) M Morizono	11	12	4	9	5

Quarterfinals
1	(Chinese Taipei) Chuang C-y	5	11	11	11	11
(Japan) S Togami	11	8	4	6	6

===== Section 2 =====
First round
9	(Slovakia) L Pistej	11	6	8	10	9
(Poland) M Badowski	8	11	11	12	11
(Chinese Taipei) Peng W-w	8	10	11	8	5
22	(Belgium) R Devos	11	12	7	11	11
18	(Belgium) F Lambiet	8	11	7	11	11	11
(Russia) V Gadiev	11	9	11	8	5	6
(Spain) C Machado	9	11	8	11	5	5
14	(Paraguay) M Aguirre	11	9	11	7	11	11
16	(Croatia) A Gacina	11	13	8	8	6	5
(Ukraine) Y Pryshchepa	9	11	11	11	11	11
(Japan) H Tazoe	8	9	10	9
32	(Sweden) A Kallberg	11	11	12	11
20	(Belarus) A Khanin	9	9	11	11	4	11	11
(Russia) M Grebnev	11	11	4	9	11	3	7
(Romania) A Cazacu	6	5	11	3	11	9
3	(United States) K Jha	11	11	5	11	6	11

Second round
(Poland) M Badowski	4	5	8	7
22	(Belgium) R Devos	11	11	11	11
18	(Belgium) F Lambiet	6	11	11	11	11
14	(Paraguay) M Aguirre	11	6	5	9	9
(Ukraine) Y Pryshchepa	9	5	11	3	7
32	(Sweden) A Kallberg	11	11	5	11	11
20	(Belarus) A Khanin	8	4	4	7
3	(United States) K Jha	11	11	11	11

Third round
22	(Belgium) R Devos	11	11	7	11	5	7	11
18	(Belgium) F Lambiet	7	6	11	6	11	11	5
32	(Sweden) A Kallberg	11	8	11	11	9	12	11
3	(United States) K Jha	13	11	6	9	11	10	8

Quarterfinals
22	(Belgium) R Devos	11	7	9	3	11	11	10
32	(Sweden) A Kallberg	5	11	11	11	7	7	12

==== Bottom half ====
===== Section 3 =====
First round
4	(Brazil) G Tsuboi	11	11	11	10	11
(Thailand) P Tanviriyavechakul	4	7	8	12	7
(Japan) T Jin	11	11	11	11
31	(Russia) A Liventsov	6	6	7	3
17	(Mexico) M Madrid	4	9	12	6	11	11	5
(Japan) K Tazoe	11	11	10	11	7	8	11
(Japan) K Matsudaira	17	12	9	8	8
9	(Croatia) T Pucar	19	10	11	11	11
13	(Russia) K Skachkov	9	11	3	4	13	11	11
(Japan) Y Hirano	11	5	11	11	11	8	7
(Slovakia) S Novota	5	11	12	8	7
30	(Puerto Rico) B Afanador	11	8	14	11	11
23	(Germany) D Qiu	10	14	9	8
(India) A Anthony	12	16	11	11
(Ukraine) O Didukh	9	13	11	11	8
5	(Slovenia) D Jorgic	11	15	13	9	11

Second round
4	(Brazil) G Tsuboi	6	6	9	8
(Japan) T Jin	11	11	11	11
(Japan) K Tazoe	5	9	2	11	13	12
9	(Croatia) T Pucar	11	11	11	9	11	14
13	(Russia) K Skachkov	4	7	11	12	5	11	11
30	(Puerto Rico) B Afanador	11	11	9	10	11	9	5
(India) A Anthony	7	9	11	9	6
5	(Slovenia) D Jorgic	11	11	9	11	11

Third round
(Japan) T Jin	7	11	11	3	11
9	(Croatia) T Pucar	11	13	7	11	13
13	(Russia) K Skachkov	11	5	11	6	14	11
5	(Slovenia) D Jorgic	9	11	6	11	12	6

Quarterfinals
9	(Croatia) T Pucar	11	11	11	11
13	(Russia) K Skachkov	5	6	4	5

===== Section 4 =====
First round
6	(Germany) B Duda	7	11	11	11	11
(Japan) Y Kizukuri	11	7	5	7	4
(Germany) N Hohmeier	12	7	7	9
19	(Brazil) T Monteiro	14	11	11	11
21	(Japan) Y Uda	5	8	11	11	9	13	11
(France) A Hachard	11	11	8	9	11	11	8
(Uzbekistan) Z Kenjaev	11	5	11	13	11
15	(France) Q Robinot	9	11	8	11	3
11	(France) C Akkuzu	13	9	9	11	11	6	11
(Italy) C Shuainan	11	11	11	5	8	11	6
(Russia) I Nikulin	11	5	7	8	10
26	(Belgium) M Allegro	7	11	11	11	12
25	(Argentina) H Cifuntes	11	12	5	9
(Sweden) E Ranefur	13	14	11	11
(Scotland) G Rumgay	4	11	11	6	11	3	7
2	(Sweden) K Karlsson	11	8	3	11	7	11	11

Second round
6	(Germany) B Duda	9	13	11	9	11	11
19	(Brazil) T Monteiro	11	11	6	11	4	6
21	(Japan) Y Uda	11	11	12	11
(Uzbekistan) Z Kenjaev	6	6	10	8
11	(France) C Akkuzu	10	10	14	12	12	11
26	(Belgium) M Allegro	12	12	12	10	10	7
(Sweden) E Ranefur	11	7	8	9	13
2	(Sweden) K Karlsson	6	11	11	11	15

Third round
6	(Germany) B Duda	11	11	3	11	11
21	(Japan) Y Uda	7	9	11	6	6
11	(France) C Akkuzu	6	11	11	11	11
2	(Sweden) K Karlsson	11	5	7	7	8

Quarterfinals
6	(Germany) B Duda	7	6	9	6
2	(Sweden) K Karlsson	11	11	11	11

== Women's singles ==
=== Seeds ===
1. (Japan) Hitomi Sato (second round)
2. (Japan) Saki Shibata (quarter-finals)
3. (Austria) Sofia Polcanova (first round)
4. (Romania) Elizabeta Samara (third round)
5. (Japan) Miyu Kato (final)
6. (Japan) Honoka Hashimoto (second round)
7. (Puerto Rico) Adriana Diaz (quarter-finals)
8. (Japan) Miyu Nagasaki (semi-finals)
9. (United States) Wu Yue (third round)
10. (Luxembourg) Ni Xia Lian (second round)
11. (Ukraine) Ganna Gaponova (second round)
12. (Brazil) Bruna Takahashi (first round)
13. (Austria) Amelie Solja (third round)
14. (Japan) Satsuki Odo (semi-finals)
15. (Luxembourg) Sarah De Nutte (second round)
16. (Japan) Maki Shiomi (third round)
17. (Sweden) Linda Bergstrom (second round)
18. (Ukraine) Tetyana Bilenko (third round)
19. (Japan) Miyuu Kihara (champion)
20. (Monaco) Yang Xiaoxin (second round)
21. (Croatia) Mateja Jeger (first round)
22. (Belarus) Viktoria Pavlovich (second round)
23. (Austria) Yui Hamamoto (first round)
24. (Belarus) Daria Trigolos (first round)
25. (Belarus) Nadezhda Bogdanova (second round)
26. (India) Ayhika Mukherjee (second round)
27. (India) Madhurika Patkar (first round)
28. (France) Pauline Chasselin (first round)
29. (Chile) Paulina Vega (first round)
30. (Japan) Yumeno Soma (second round)
31. (Poland) Natalia Bajor (second round)
32. (Croatia) Sun Jiayi (third round)

=== Draw ===
==== Finals ====
Semifinals
8	(Japan) Miyu Nagasaki	11	11	6	6	6	10
19	(Japan) Miyuu Kihara	8	9	11	11	11	12
14	(Japan) Satsuki Odo	8	15	11	11	5	9
5	(Japan) Miyu Kato	11	17	9	7	11	11

Final
19	(Japan) Miyuu Kihara	13	11	8	8	12	5	11
5	(Japan) Miyu Kato	11	6	11	11	10	11	8

==== Top half ====
===== Section 1 =====
First round
1	(Japan) H Sato	11	11	11	11
(Russia) A Komova	1	6	4	2
(Japan) H Ojio	2	5	11	11	11	11
23	(Austria) Y Hamamoto	11	11	8	8	9	9
30	(Japan) S Yumeno	11	11	10	12	11
(England) M Tsaptsinos	5	2	12	10	4
(Japan) A Narumoto	8	11	8	6	11	11	6
9	(United States) Wu Y	11	4	11	11	8	8	11
13	(Austria) A Solja	11	9	11	9	11	8	11
(Romania) A Diaconu	2	11	7	11	8	11	3
(Brazil) C Kumahara	11	7	11	11	11
21	(Croatia) M Jeger	7	11	5	7	4
20	(Monaco) X Yang	11	11	11	7	11
(Bosnia and Herzegovina) E Hadziahmetovic	7	2	7	11	9
(Russia) E Abraamian	6	4	4	7
8	(Japan) M Nagasaki	11	11	11	11

Second round
1	(Japan) H Sato	11	5	11	11	9	6	4
(Japan) H Ojio	1	11	9	9	11	11	11
30	(Japan) S Yumeno	11	11	5	12	11	14	9
9	(United States) Y Wu	5	3	11	14	5	16	11
13	(Austria) A Solja	11	11	8	11	8	11
(Brazil) C Kumahara	5	9	11	5	11	9
20	(Monaco) X Yang	6	5	5	6
8	(Japan) M Nagasaki	11	11	11	11

Third round
(Japan) H Ojio	8	11	12	13	16
9	(United States) Y Wu	11	9	10	11	14
13	(Austria) A Solja	6	7	4	7
8	(Japan) M Nagasaki	11	11	11	11

Quarterfinals
(Japan) H Ojio	3	11	8	7	4
8	(Japan) M Nagasaki	11	9	11	11	11

===== Section 2 =====
First round
7	(Puerto Rico) A Diaz	11	11	11	5	11
(Romania) A Singeorzan	5	8	5	11	6
(Greece) A Toliou	5	11	6	7	2
31	(Poland) N Bajor	11	5	11	11	11
25	(Belarus) N Bogdanova	11	11	11	8	7	7	12
(Croatia) K Cakol	5	2	8	11	11	11	10
(Chinese Taipei) Tsai Y-c	10	3	11	12	8	4
16	(Japan) M Shiomi	12	11	5	10	11	11
15	(Luxembourg) X L Ni	11	9	11	11	11	11
(Italy) X Li	8	11	6	8	13	2
(France) M Migot	7	9	5	4
19	(Japan) M Kihara	11	11	11	11
17	(Sweden) L Bergstrom	11	11	11	11
(Russia) A Kolish	5	8	7	4
(Chinese Taipei) Su P-l	11	9	11	5	4	11	11
3	(Austria) S Polcanova	7	11	9	11	11	8	8

Second round
7	(Puerto Rico) A Diaz	11	11	5	11	10	11
31	(Poland) N Bajor	8	7	11	5	12	3
25	(Belarus) N Bogdanova	12	7	1	3	8
16	(Japan) M Shiomi	10	11	11	11	11
15	(Luxembourg) X L Ni	5	3	7	10
19	(Japan) M Kihara	11	11	11	12
17	(Sweden) L Bergstrom	6	9	8	10
(Chinese Taipei) Su P-l	11	11	11	12

Third round
7	(Puerto Rico) A Diaz	11	11	11	11
16	(Japan) M Shiomi	8	9	5	4
19	(Japan) M Kihara	11	11	13	11
(Chinese Taipei) Su P-l	9	8	11	4

Quarterfinals
7	(Puerto Rico) A Diaz	11	6	10	10
19	(Japan) M Kihara	13	11	12	12

==== Bottom half ====
===== Section 3 =====
First round
4	(Romania) E Samara	11	11	10	7	11	11
(Chinese Taipei) Li Y-j	6	8	12	11	3	5
(Thailand) O Paranang	13	11	12	9	11
29	(Chile) P Vega	11	8	10	11	6
28	(France) P Chasselin	9	7	12	10	11	11	10
(Thailand) T Khetkhuan	11	11	10	12	9	9	12
(Germany) Y Wan	11	8	5	3	6
14	(Japan) S Odo	8	11	11	11	11
15	(Luxembourg) S De Nutte	9	11	11	5	11	11
(Poland) J Slazak	11	3	4	11	2	6
(South Korea) Shin Y-b	w/o
24	(Belarus) D Trigolos
18	(Ukraine) T Bilenko	15	11	13	9	11
(Chinese Taipei) Huang Y-w	13	8	11	11	6
(Russia) M Malanina	11	6	4	5	2
6	(Japan) H Hashimoto	8	11	11	11	11

Second round
4	(Romania) E Samara	12	6	11	11	2	11
(Thailand) O Paranang	10	11	6	9	11	8
(Thailand) T Khetkhuan	13	7	3	8
14	(Japan) S Odo	15	11	11	11
15	(Luxembourg) S De Nutte	3	12	6	4	4
(South Korea) Shin Y-b	11	10	11	11	11
18	(Ukraine) T Bilenko	14	4	12	11	10	11	11
6	(Japan) H Hashimoto	12	11	14	9	12	6	9

Third round
4	(Romania) E Samara	6	12	11	11	10	8
14	(Japan) S Odo	11	14	4	8	12	11
(South Korea) Shin Y-b	8	11	5	11	11	11
18	(Ukraine) T Bilenko	11	8	11	6	5	9

Quarterfinals
14	(Japan) S Odo	10	11	11	11	11
(South Korea) Shin Y-b	12	4	6	8	5

===== Section 4 =====
First round
5	(Japan) M Kato	11	11	11	11
(Norway) W Ma	2	7	9	4
(Chinese Taipei) Huang Y-h	11	11	11	11
27	(India) M Patkar	7	5	2	7
32	(Croatia) J Sun	8	11	11	11	11
(Russia) E Chernyavskaya	11	5	9	5	6
(India) S Akula	8	4	7	5
11	(Ukraine) G Gaponova	11	11	11	11
12	(Brazil) B Takahashi	8	11	5	4	11	2
(Thailand) N Komwong	11	6	11	11	2	11
(Wales) C Carey	5	7	13	9	12	11	6
26	(India) A Mukherjee	11	11	11	11	10	6	11
22	(Belarus) V Pavlovich	12	11	10	11	11
(Brazil) J Yamada	10	7	12	4	7
(Austria) K Mischek	5	8	5	4
2	(Japan) S Shibata	11	11	11	11

Second round
5	(Japan) M Kato	11	11	11	11
(Chinese Taipei) Huang Y-h	6	7	7	9
32	(Croatia) J Sun	8	11	11	17	11
11	(Ukraine) G Gaponova	11	5	4	15	2
(Thailand) N Komwong	8	4	12	11	11	11
26	(India) A Mukherjee	11	11	10	8	7	7
22	(Belarus) V Pavlovich	8	5	7	6
2	(Japan) S Shibata	11	11	11	11

Third round
5	(Japan) M Kato	5	11	11	7	11	11
32	(Croatia) J Sun	11	6	6	11	5	7
(Thailand) N Komwong	3	4	11	2	11	6
2	(Japan) S Shibata	11	11	8	11	8	11

Quarterfinals
5	(Japan) M Kato	11	9	11	11	11
2	(Japan) S Shibata	9	11	5	6	4

== Men's doubles ==
=== Seeds ===
1. (Belgium) Martin Allegro / Florent Lambiet (final)
2. (Brazil) Eric Jouti / Gustavo Tsuboi (quarter-finals)
3. (Poland) Marek Badowski / Patryk Zatowka (quarter-finals)
4. (Germany) Dang Qiu / Benedikt Duda (semi-finals)
5. (Belgium) Robin Devos / Laurens Devos (first round)
6. (Paraguay) Alejandro Toranzos / Marcelo Aguirre (first round)
7. (Sweden) Anton Kallberg / Truls Moregard (semi-finals)
8. (Croatia) Frane Kojic / Tomislav Pucar (first round)

=== Draw ===
First round
1	(Belgium) M Allegro (Belgium) F Lambiet	11	12	11
(Sweden) F Akerstrom (Sweden) S Berglund	9	10	9
(Argentina) G Alto (Argentina) H Cifuentes	11	11	11
6	(Paraguay) M Aguirre (Paraguay) A Toranzos	7	3	3
7	(Sweden) A Kallberg (Sweden) T Moregard	11	8	11	11
(Ukraine) Y Pryshchepa (Ukraine) V Yefimov	9	11	8	9
(Sweden) S Arvidsson (Sweden) E Ranefur	10	11	6	5
3	(Poland) M Badowski (Poland) P Zatowka	12	9	11	11
4	(Germany) B Duda (Germany) D Qiu	6	12	11	5	13
(United States) K Jha (Brazil) T Monteiro	11	10	4	11	11
(Japan) H Tazoe (Japan) K Tazoe	11	11	11
5	(Belgium) L Devos (Belgium) R Devos	5	9	9
8	(Croatia) F Kojic (Croatia) T Pucar	9	11	7	1
(Japan) S Togami (Japan) Y Uda	11	6	11	11
(Slovakia) S Novota (Slovakia) L Pistej	8	8	13	10
2	(Brazil) E Jouti (Brazil) G Tsuboi	11	11	11	12

Quarterfinals
1	(Belgium) M Allegro (Belgium) F Lambiet	11	7	11	11
(Argentina) G Alto (Argentina) H Cifuentes	9	11	2	6
7	(Sweden) A Kallberg (Sweden) T Moregard	11	8	11	8	11
3	(Poland) M Badowski (Poland) P Zatowka	7	11	6	11	5
4	(Germany) B Duda (Germany) D Qiu	7	11	11	12
(Japan) H Tazoe (Japan) K Tazoe	11	8	7	10
(Japan) S Togami (Japan) Y Uda	12	11	12
2	(Brazil) E Jouti (Brazil) G Tsuboi	10	8	10

Semifinals
1	(Belgium) M Allegro (Belgium) F Lambiet	11	6	4	11	11
7	(Sweden) A Kallberg (Sweden) T Moregard	7	11	11	7	5
4	(Germany) B Duda (Germany) D Qiu	11	10	10	7
(Japan) S Togami (Japan) Y Uda	7	12	12	11

Final
1	(Belgium) M Allegro (Belgium) F Lambiet	9	12	9	11	8
(Japan) S Togami (Japan) Y Uda	11	10	11	3	11

== Women's doubles ==
=== Seeds ===
1. (Japan) Honoka Hashimoto / Hitomi Sato (final)
2. (Japan) Saki Shibata / Satsuki Odo (semi-finals)
3. (Romania) Adina Diaconu / (United States) Wu Yue (second round)
4. (Romania) Elizabeta Samara / (Norway) Ma Wenting (semi-finals)
5. (Croatia) Mateja Jeger / Sun Jiayi (first round)
6. (Chinese Taipei) Li Yu-jhun / Huang Yu-wen (first round)
7. (Japan) Miyu Nagasaki / Miyuu Kihara (champion)
8. (Puerto Rico) Melanie Diaz / Adriana Diaz (second round)

=== Draw ===
First round
1	(Japan) H Hashimoto (Japan) H Sato	11	11	12
(Thailand) O Paranang (Thailand) J Sawettabut	7	6	10
(Chinese Taipei) Huang H (Chinese Taipei) Huang Y-c	9	11	9	12	11
5	(Croatia) M Jeger (Croatia) J Sun	11	2	11	10	3
6	(Chinese Taipei) Huang Y-w (Chinese Taipei) Li Y-j	6	7	8
(Japan) H Ojio (Japan) Y Soma	11	11	11
(Brazil) B Takahashi (Brazil) J Yamada	6	4	9
4	(Norway) W Ma (Romania) E Samara	11	11	11
3	(Romania) A Diaconu (United States) Y Wu	11	11	4	9	11
(France) M Migot (France) L Pfefer	9	5	11	11	5
(Austria) K Mischek (Austria) A Solja	9	5	10
7	(Japan) M Kihara (Japan) M Nagasaki	11	11	12
8	(Puerto Rico) A Diaz (Puerto Rico) M Diaz	11	11	11
(Croatia) K Cakol (Croatia) I Tubikanec	6	4	6
(Norway) I Doval (Chile) D Ortega	6	7	5
2	(Japan) S Odo (Japan) S Shibata	11	11	11

Quarterfinals
1	(Japan) H Hashimoto (Japan) H Sato	11	11	13
(Chinese Taipei) Huang H (Chinese Taipei) Huang Y-c	7	7	11
(Japan) H Ojio (Japan) Y Soma	10	3	9
4	(Norway) W Ma (Romania) E Samara	12	11	11
3	(Romania) A Diaconu (United States) Y Wu	5	11	2	3
7	(Japan) M Kihara (Japan) M Nagasaki	11	8	11	11
8	(Puerto Rico) A Diaz (Puerto Rico) M Diaz	7	6	5
2	(Japan) S Odo (Japan) S Shibata	11	11	11

Semifinals
1	(Japan) H Hashimoto (Japan) H Sato	4	11	6	11	12
4	(Norway) W Ma (Romania) E Samara	11	4	11	3	10
7	(Japan) M Kihara (Japan) M Nagasaki	11	14	10	17
2	(Japan) S Odo (Japan) S Shibata	8	12	12	15

Final
1	(Japan) H Hashimoto (Japan) H Sato	5	12	11	8
7	(Japan) M Kihara (Japan) M Nagasaki	11	14	7	11
