= WTT Contender Skopje 2026 =

Table tennis tournament in North Macedonia

Tournament details
- Dates: 1–7 June
- Edition: 2nd
- Total prize money: US$100,000
- Venue: Sports Center Jane Sandanski
- Location: Skopje, North Macedonia

Champions
- Men's singles: (Slovenia) Darko Jorgić
- Women's singles: (Japan) Satsuki Odo
- Men's doubles: (South Korea) Lim Jong-hoon (South Korea) Oh Jun-sung
- Women's doubles: (Japan) Satsuki Odo (Japan) Sakura Yokoi
- Mixed doubles: (Japan) Hiromu Kobayashi (Japan) Miyuu Kihara

The WTT Contender Skopje 2026 is a table tennis tournament that take place at the Sports Center Jane Sandanski, Skopje, North Macedonia, from 1 to 7 June and have a total prize of US$100,000.

== Tournament ==
The WTT Contender Skopje 2026 is the tenth tournament of the 2026 WTT Series and is part of the WTT Contender event.

=== Venue ===
This tournament is held at the Sports Center Jane Sandanski in Skopje, North Macedonia.

=== Point distribution ===
Below is the point distribution table for each phase of the tournament based on the WTT World Ranking for the WTT Contender event.

Event	Winner	Finalist	Semi-finalist	Quarter-finalist	Round of 16	Round of 32
Singles	400	280	180	120	30	4
Doubles	400	280	180	45	4	—

=== Prize pool ===
The total prize money is US$100,000 with the distribution of the prize money in accordance with WTT regulations.

Event	Winner	Finalist	Semi-finalist	Quarter-finalist	Round of 16	Round of 32
Singles	$5,000	$2,500	$1,275	$1,025	$825	$650
Doubles	$2,500	$1,500	$950	$550	$350	—

== Men's singles ==
=== Seeds ===
1. (Denmark) Anders Lind (quarter-finals)
2. (Slovenia) Darko Jorgić (champion)
3. (France) Flavien Coton (first round)
4. (France) Simon Gauzy (quarter-finals)
5. (South Korea) Oh Jun-sung (first round)
6. (United States) Kanak Jha (final)
7. (Egypt) Omar Assar (second round)
8. (Japan) Hiroto Shinozuka (semi-finals)

=== Finals ===
Semi-finals
8	(Japan) Hiroto Shinozuka	6	11	3	11	5
6	(United States) Kanak Jha	11	6	11	7	11
(Sweden) Anton Källberg	9	11	11	11	7
2	(Slovenia) Darko Jorgić	11	5	5	13	11

Final
6	(United States) Kanak Jha	11	14	12	11	8	7
2	(Slovenia) Darko Jorgić	3	16	14	8	11	11

=== Top half ===
==== Section 1 ====
First round
1	(Denmark) A Lind	11	11	11
(Japan) M Yoshimura	5	7	9
WC	(South Korea) Kim M-h	9	8	10
(Romania) E Ionescu	11	11	12
(Portugal) T Apolónia	5	8	11	11	11
(India) M Thakkar	11	11	5	8	9
Q	(Sweden) M Karlsson	11	5	10	9
8	(Japan) H Shinozuka	6	11	11	11

Second round
1	(Denmark) A Lind	4	11	11	11
(Romania) E Ionescu	11	6	9	4
(Portugal) T Apolónia	14	11	5	11	10
8	(Japan) H Shinozuka	16	9	11	6	12

Quarter-finals
1	(Denmark) A Lind	3	11	8	7
8	(Japan) H Shinozuka	11	7	11	11

==== Section 2 ====
First round
4	(France) S Gauzy	9	11	11	11
(France) J Seyfried	11	6	7	3
WC	(Spain) Á Robles	11	11	11
Q	(France) J Rolland	8	9	7
WC	(France) E Dorr	5	8	10
Q	(Portugal) M Freitas	11	11	12
Q	(Slovenia) D Kožul	11	7	9	11	6
6	(United States) K Jha	9	11	11	8	11

Second round
4	(France) S Gauzy	11	11	10	11
WC	(Spain) Á Robles	6	1	12	9
Q	(Portugal) M Freitas	11	1	7	7
6	(United States) K Jha	9	11	11	11

Quarter-finals
4	(France) S Gauzy	6	7	12	7
6	(United States) K Jha	11	11	10	11

=== Bottom half ===
==== Section 3 ====
First round
5	(South Korea) Oh J-s	1	13	11	5
(Sweden) A Källberg	11	15	8	11
(South Korea) Lim J-h	12	14	11
(Denmark) J Groth	10	12	4
Q	(South Korea) Park Gy-h	7	11	11	11	13
(France) L Bardet	11	13	6	5	11
(Nigeria) Q Aruna	11	3	9	11	12
3	(France) F Coton	5	11	11	7	10

Second round
(Sweden) A Källberg	11	10	11	11	11
(South Korea) Lim J-h	9	12	8	13	6
Q	(South Korea) Park Gy-h	11	8	11	11
(Nigeria) Q Aruna	4	11	9	5

Quarter-finals
(Sweden) A Källberg	11	12	11
Q	(South Korea) Park Gy-h	5	10	2

==== Section 4 ====
First round
7	(Egypt) O Assar	11	11	12
Q	(Spain) D Lillo	9	7	10
WC	(Belgium) A Rassenfosse	11	11	15
(Japan) Y Tanaka	4	2	13
Q	(Romania) I Chirita	11	9	7	7
(South Korea) Park Ga-h	4	11	11	11
Q	(Belgium) C Nuytinck	3	11	6	11	5
2	(Slovenia) D Jorgić	11	9	11	9	11

Second round
7	(Egypt) O Assar	9	11	10	11	12
WC	(Belgium) A Rassenfosse	11	6	12	6	14
(South Korea) Park Ga-h	6	12	5
2	(Slovenia) D Jorgić	11	14	11

Quarter-finals
WC	(Belgium) A Rassenfosse	11	10	7	11
2	(Slovenia) D Jorgić	6	12	11	13

== Women's singles ==
=== Seeds ===
1. (Japan) Satsuki Odo (champion)
2. (Japan) Honoka Hashimoto (final)
3. (South Korea) Joo Cheon-hui (quarter-finals)
4. (Puerto Rico) Adriana Díaz (quarter-finals)
5. (Egypt) Hana Goda (quarter-finals)
6. (France) Jia Nan Yuan (second round)
7. (Japan) Hitomi Sato (semi-finals)
8. (Romania) Bernadette Szőcs (first round)

=== Finals ===
Semi-finals
1	(Japan) Satsuki Odo	11	11	10	11
7	(Japan) Hitomi Sato	8	7	12	9
(Japan) Sakura Yokoi	13	7	5
2	(Japan) Honoka Hashimoto	15	11	11

Final
1	(Japan) Satsuki Odo	11	11	11	11
2	(Japan) Honoka Hashimoto	7	9	7	3

=== Top half ===
==== Section 1 ====
First round
1	(Japan) S Odo	11	4	11	12
(Hong Kong) Doo H K	3	11	6	10
Q	(South Korea) Yoo S-w	11	11	11
WC	(Serbia) R Bezeg	8	7	9
Q	(Chinese Taipei) Peng Y-h	11	2	9	4
(France) P Pavade	9	11	11	11
(United States) L Zhang	6	6	5
5/WC	(Egypt) H Goda	11	11	11

Second round
1	(Japan) S Odo	11	11	7	11
Q	(South Korea) Yoo S-w	3	7	11	2
(France) P Pavade	7	13	7	8
5/WC	(Egypt) H Goda	11	11	11	11

Quarter-finals
1	(Japan) S Odo	12	11	9	11
5/WC	(Egypt) H Goda	10	6	11	8

==== Section 2 ====
First round
3	(South Korea) Joo C-h	11	11	11
Q	(Sweden) C Källberg	6	8	3
(Spain) M Xiao	11	11	11
(Austria) S Polcanova	2	7	8
Q	(England) T T Ho	5	11	6	12	9
(Japan) M Kihara	11	8	11	10	11
(Australia) M Jee	5	8	2
7	(Japan) H Sato	11	11	11

Second round
3	(South Korea) Joo C-h	11	11	9	11
(Spain) M Xiao	8	8	11	1
(Japan) M Kihara	2	8	5
7	(Japan) H Sato	11	11	11

Quarter-finals
3	(South Korea) Joo C-h	4	9	9
7	(Japan) H Sato	11	11	11

=== Bottom half ===
==== Section 3 ====
First round
6	(France) J N Yuan	11	9	11	4	11
Q	(Japan) S Shibata	4	11	8	11	5
Q	(Japan) C Muramatsu	7	8	4
(Japan) S Yokoi	11	11	11
(France) Ch Lutz	11	7	3	6
(Chinese Taipei) Yeh Y-t	7	11	11	11
(Romania) E Samara	5	8	22	9
4	(Puerto Rico) A Díaz	11	11	20	11

Second round
6	(France) J N Yuan	6	5	11	7
(Japan) S Yokoi	11	11	6	11
(Chinese Taipei) Yeh Y-t	6	11	5	11	2
4	(Puerto Rico) A Díaz	11	9	11	8	11

Quarter-finals
(Japan) S Yokoi	5	5	12	11	12
4	(Puerto Rico) A Díaz	11	11	10	8	10

==== Section 4 ====
First round
8	(Romania) B Szőcs	11	6	5	6
Q	(France) Ca Lutz	8	11	11	11
(Chinese Taipei) Huang Y-j	7	12	1	11	10
(Japan) K Akae	11	10	11	8	12
Q	(Japan) A Sasao	10	11	11	11
WC	(Croatia) H Arapović	12	7	6	7
(Wales) A Hursey	9	2	5
2	(Japan) H Hashimoto	11	11	11

Second round
Q	(France) Ca Lutz	9	9	7
(Japan) K Akae	11	11	11
(Japan) A Sasao	9	11	8	9
2	(Japan) H Hashimoto	11	7	11	11

Quarter-finals
(Japan) K Akae	7	11	7	11	6
2	(Japan) H Hashimoto	11	8	11	9	11

== Men's doubles ==
=== Seeds ===
1. (South Korea) Lim Jong-hoon / (South Korea) Oh Jun-sung (champions)
2. (France) Florian Bourrassaud / (France) Esteban Dorr (quarter-finals)
3. (Belgium) Martin Allegro / (Belgium) Adrien Rassenfosse (semi-finals)
4. (Egypt) Mohamed El-Beiali / (Egypt) Youssef Abdel-Aziz (first round)

=== Finals ===
Semi-finals
1	(South Korea) Lim Jong-hoon (South Korea) Oh Jun-sung	11	11	11
3	(Belgium) Martin Allegro (Belgium) Adrien Rassenfosse	4	6	4
Q	(Slovenia) Darko Jorgić (Slovenia) Deni Kožul	7	11	11	11
(France) Flavien Coton (France) Simon Gauzy	11	3	5	6

Final
1	(South Korea) Lim Jong-hoon (South Korea) Oh Jun-sung	12	11	11
Q	(Slovenia) Darko Jorgić (Slovenia) Deni Kožul	10	9	5

=== Top half ===
First round
1	(South Korea) Lim J-h (South Korea) Oh J-s	12	11	11
WC	(North Macedonia) K Stanojkovski (North Macedonia) A Jakimovski	10	1	2
Q	(England) T Jarvis (England) C Green	11	12	11
WC	(Japan) Y Tanaka (Japan) H Kobayashi	2	10	9
3	(Belgium) M Allegro (Belgium) A Rassenfosse	7	11	11	5	11
Q	(South Korea) Park Gy-h (South Korea) Kwon H	11	6	7	11	6
(Spain) J Pérez (Spain) D Berzosa	11	10	8	9
(Japan) Y Sakai (Japan) J Yokotani	9	12	11	11

Quarter-finals
1	(South Korea) Lim J-h (South Korea) Oh J-s	11	10	11	11
Q	(England) T Jarvis (England) C Green	9	12	7	5
3	(Belgium) M Allegro (Belgium) A Rassenfosse	11	13	12
(Japan) Y Sakai (Japan) J Yokotani	3	11	10

Semi-finals
1	(South Korea) Lim J-h (South Korea) Oh J-s	11	11	11
3	(Belgium) M Allegro (Belgium) A Rassenfosse	4	6	4

=== Bottom half ===
First round
(Spain) R de las Heras (Spain) D Lillo	11	7	11	8	9
(Portugal) T Apolónia (Portugal) M Freitas	8	11	6	11	11
Q	(Slovenia) D Jorgić (Slovenia) D Kožul	11	11	11
4	(Egypt) M Elbeiali (Egypt) Y Abdelaziz	9	9	6
(France) F Coton (France) S Gauzy	12	7	11	9	11
(Romania) E Ionescu (Romania) D Movileanu	10	11	7	11	6
Q	(Croatia) I Ban (Croatia) F Zeljko	6	4	12	3
2	(France) F Bourrassaud (France) E Dorr	11	11	10	11

Quarter-finals
(Portugal) T Apolónia (Portugal) M Freitas	9	7	11	9
Q	(Slovenia) D Jorgić (Slovenia) D Kožul	11	11	6	11
(France) F Coton (France) S Gauzy	9	11	12	11	11
2	(France) F Bourrassaud (France) E Dorr	11	7	10	13	5

Semi-finals
Q	(Slovenia) D Jorgić (Slovenia) D Kožul	7	11	11	11
(France) F Coton (France) S Gauzy	11	3	5	6

== Women's doubles ==
=== Seeds ===
1. (Japan) Satsuki Odo / (Japan) Sakura Yokoi (champions)
2. (Japan) Hitomi Sato / (Japan) Saki Shibata (first round)
3. (Hong Kong) Doo Hoi Kem / (Hong Kong) Ng Wing Lam (quarter-finals)
4. (South Korea) Joo Cheon-hui / (South Korea) Choi Hyo-joo (first round)

=== Finals ===
Semi-finals
1	(Japan) Satsuki Odo (Japan) Sakura Yokoi	8	11	4	14	11
(France) Prithika Pavade (France) Charlotte Lutz	11	8	11	12	5
(Puerto Rico) Adriana Díaz (Japan) Honoka Hashimoto	17	5	10	8
Q	(Japan) Cocona Muramatsu (Japan) Sachi Aoki	15	11	12	11

Final
1	(Japan) Satsuki Odo (Japan) Sakura Yokoi	11	11	17
Q	(Japan) Cocona Muramatsu (Japan) Sachi Aoki	5	6	15

=== Top half ===
First round
1	(Japan) S Odo (Japan) S Yokoi	11	11	11
WC	(North Macedonia) S Stojanovska (born 2008) (North Macedonia) F Jovanoska	3	2	4
(Romania) E Samara (Romania) B Szőcs	8	11	11	12	5
Q	(Chinese Taipei) Peng Y-h (Chinese Taipei) Chen S-y	11	9	4	14	11
4	(South Korea) Joo C-h (South Korea) Choi H-j	2	6	11	11	12
(France) P Pavade (France) Ch Lutz	11	11	8	5	14
Q	(Japan) K Kimura (Japan) M Kihara	7	7	11	9
(South Korea) Choi S-y (South Korea) Lee D-e	11	11	6	11

Quarter-finals
1	(Japan) S Odo (Japan) S Yokoi	11	11	11
Q	(Chinese Taipei) Peng Y-h (Chinese Taipei) Chen S-y	4	3	3
(France) P Pavade (France) Ch Lutz	11	10	11	10	11
(South Korea) Choi S-y (South Korea) Lee D-e	7	12	2	12	8

Semi-finals
1	(Japan) S Odo (Japan) S Yokoi	8	11	4	14	11
(France) P Pavade (France) Ch Lutz	11	8	11	12	5

=== Bottom half ===
First round
(Puerto Rico) A Díaz (Japan) H Hashimoto	11	11	18
(Austria) S Polcanova (France) J N Yuan	8	7	16
Q	(France) Ca Lutz (France) A Zarif	3	9	8
3	(Hong Kong) Doo H K (Hong Kong) Ng W L	11	11	11
(Hong Kong) Kong T L (Hong Kong) Lee H M	11	11	11
WC	(North Macedonia) A Nikolov (North Macedonia) S Stojanovska (born 2005)	6	4	1
Q	(Japan) C Muramatsu (Japan) S Aoki	9	11	9	11	11
2	(Japan) H Sato (Japan) S Shibata	11	6	11	5	4

Quarter-finals
(Puerto Rico) A Díaz (Japan) H Hashimoto	11	11	11
3	(Hong Kong) Doo H K (Hong Kong) Ng W L	8	9	6
(Hong Kong) Kong T L (Hong Kong) Lee H M	11	5	8	7
Q	(Japan) C Muramatsu (Japan) S Aoki	7	11	11	11

Semi-finals
(Puerto Rico) A Díaz (Japan) H Hashimoto	17	5	10	8
Q	(Japan) C Muramatsu (Japan) S Aoki	15	11	12	11

== Mixed doubles ==
=== Seeds ===
1. (Spain) Álvaro Robles / (Spain) María Xiao (first round)
2. (Romania) Eduard Ionescu / (Romania) Bernadette Szőcs (quarter-finals)
3. (Japan) Satoshi Aida / (Japan) Hitomi Sato (first round)
4. (France) Jules Rolland / (France) Prithika Pavade (first round)

=== Finals ===
Semi-finals
(France) Esteban Dorr (Puerto Rico) Adriana Díaz	12	4	11	11
(Croatia) Ivor Ban (Croatia) Hana Arapović	10	11	4	7
Q	(Japan) Hiromu Kobayashi (Japan) Miyuu Kihara	8	11	12	9	11
(Japan) Maharu Yoshimura (Japan) Satsuki Odo	11	4	10	11	5

Final
(France) Esteban Dorr (Puerto Rico) Adriana Díaz	2	6	9
Q	(Japan) Hiromu Kobayashi (Japan) Miyuu Kihara	11	11	11

=== Top half ===
First round
1	(Spain) Á Robles (Spain) M Xiao	5	8	11	11	7
(France) E Dorr (Puerto Rico) A Díaz	11	11	7	6	11
(South Korea) Park Ga-h (South Korea) Yoo S-w	8	9	8
Q	(Slovakia) Ľ Pištej (Luxembourg) S de Nutte	11	11	11
4	(France) J Rolland (France) P Pavade	7	11	7	10
Q	(Egypt) O Assar (Egypt) H Goda	11	4	11	12
(Croatia) I Ban (Croatia) H Arapović	11	11	11
WC	(North Macedonia) A Stojanovski (North Macedonia) S Stojanovska (born 2005)	3	5	2

Quarter-finals
(France) E Dorr (Puerto Rico) A Díaz	12	6	11	11
Q	(Slovakia) Ľ Pištej (Luxembourg) S de Nutte	10	11	8	7
Q	(Egypt) O Assar (Egypt) H Goda	5	9	6
(Croatia) I Ban (Croatia) H Arapović	11	11	11

Semi-finals
(France) E Dorr (Puerto Rico) A Díaz	12	4	11	11
(Croatia) I Ban (Croatia) H Arapović	10	11	4	7

=== Bottom half ===
First round
Q	(Japan) H Kobayashi (Japan) M Kihara	11	11	11
(Puerto Rico) S Moreno (Puerto Rico) B Burgos	7	8	5
Q	(Luxembourg) L Mladenovic (Luxembourg) X L Ni	12	5	11	11
3	(Japan) S Aida (Japan) H Sato	10	11	7	4
(Japan) M Yoshimura (Japan) S Odo	11	11	11
(England) C Green (England) T T Ho	9	4	5
WC	(North Macedonia) K Stanojkovski (North Macedonia) A Nikolov	5	3	6
2	(Romania) E Ionescu (Romania) B Szőcs	11	11	11

Quarter-finals
Q	(Japan) H Kobayashi (Japan) M Kihara	11	11	11
Q	(Luxembourg) L Mladenovic (Luxembourg) X L Ni	7	4	4
(Japan) M Yoshimura (Japan) S Odo	11	11	11
2	(Romania) E Ionescu (Romania) B Szőcs	6	7	2

Semi-finals
Q	(Japan) H Kobayashi (Japan) M Kihara	8	11	12	9	11
(Japan) M Yoshimura (Japan) S Odo	11	4	10	11	5

Preceded by WTT Contender Lagos 2026	2026 WTT Series	Succeeded by WTT Contender Zagreb 2026
