= WTT Star Contender Ljubljana 2026 =

Table tennis tournament in Slovenia

WTT Star Contender Ljubljana 2026 presented by I feel Slovenia
Tournament details
- Dates: 16–21 June
- Edition: 4th
- Total prize money: US$300,000
- Venue: Hala Tivoli
- Location: Ljubljana, Slovenia

Champions
- Men's singles: (Japan) Shunsuke Togami
- Women's singles: (Japan) Hina Hayata
- Men's doubles: (Japan) Shunsuke Togami (Japan) Hiroto Shinozuka
- Women's doubles: (Japan) Miwa Harimoto (Japan) Hina Hayata
- Mixed doubles: (South Korea) Lim Jong-hoon (South Korea) Shin Yu-bin

The WTT Star Contender Ljubljana 2026 presented by I feel Slovenia is a table tennis tournament that take place at the Hala Tivoli, Ljubljana, Slovenia, from 16 to 21 June and have a total prize of US$300,000.

== Tournament ==
The WTT Star Contender Ljubljana 2026 presented by I feel Slovenia is the twelfth tournament of the 2026 WTT Series and is part of the WTT Star Contender event.

=== Venue ===
This tournament is held at the Hala Tivoli in Ljubljana, Croatia.

=== Point distribution ===
Below is the point distribution table for each phase of the tournament based on the WTT World Ranking for the WTT Star Contender event.

Event	Winner	Finalist	Semi-finalist	Quarter-finalist	Round of 16	Round of 32	Round of 48
Singles	600	420	270	175	115	30	5
Doubles	600	420	270	70	5	—	—

=== Prize pool ===
The total prize money is US$300,000 with the distribution of the prize money in accordance with WTT regulations.

Event	Winner	Finalist	Semi-finalist	Quarter-finalist	Round of 16	Round of 32	Round of 48
Singles	$17,000	$9,025	$4,250	$2,250	$1,500	$1,100	$900
Doubles	$5,500	$3,567	$2,125	$1,200	$650	—	—

== Men's singles ==
=== Seeds ===
1. (France) Félix Lebrun (third round)
2. (China) Lin Shidong (second round)
3. (Brazil) Hugo Calderano (final)
4. (Germany) Dang Qiu (semi-finals)
5. (France) Alexis Lebrun (second round)
6. (Slovenia) Darko Jorgić (third round)
7. (China) Wen Ruibo (third round)
8. (Germany) Benedikt Duda (second round)
9. (China) Xiang Peng (quarter-finals)
10. (Japan) Shunsuke Togami (champion)
11. (Germany) Patrick Franziska (third round)
12. (France) Simon Gauzy (semi-finals)
13. (South Korea) An Jae-hyun (second round)
14. (China) Chen Yuanyu (second round)
15. (Germany) Dimitrij Ovtcharov (quarter-finals)
16. (United States) Kanak Jha (second round)

=== Finals ===
Semi-finals
12	(France) Simon Gauzy	7	9	11	11	10
3	(Brazil) Hugo Calderano	11	11	8	7	12
4	(Germany) Dang Qiu	9	8	11	12	9
10	(Japan) Shunsuke Togami	11	11	5	10	11

Final
3	(Brazil) Hugo Calderano	11	10	8	11	5	11	7
10	(Japan) Shunsuke Togami	7	12	11	4	11	7	11

=== Top half ===
==== Section 1 ====
First round
Q	(France) L de Nodrest	6	8	15
(Individual Neutral Athletes) V Sidorenko	11	11	17
(Japan) H Shinozuka	11	11	11
WC	(Slovenia) P Hribar	8	4	6
Q	(Croatia) A Gaćina	12	12	6	8
(France) T Poret	14	10	11	11
(Romania) E Ionescu	9	9	6
Q	(Chinese Taipei) Hung J-k	11	11	11

Second round
1	(France) F Lebrun	11	11	11
(Individual Neutral Athletes) V Sidorenko	2	6	4
(Japan) H Shinozuka	11	8	11	13
13	(South Korea) An J-h	9	11	7	11
12	(France) S Gauzy	11	11	11
(France) T Poret	9	9	8
Q	(Chinese Taipei) Hung J-k	7	11	11	14	13
6	(Slovenia) D Jorgić	11	8	9	16	15

Third round
1	(France) F Lebrun	11	7	9	4
(Japan) H Shinozuka	5	11	11	11
12	(France) S Gauzy	11	11	11	11
6	(Slovenia) D Jorgić	13	5	3	8

Quarter-finals
(Japan) H Shinozuka	11	4	7	11	8
12	(France) S Gauzy	9	11	11	8	11

==== Section 2 ====
First round
(France) L Bardet	14	11	9	8
(Egypt) O Assar	12	13	11	11
(China) Chen JS	12	10	11	13	9
(India) M Shah	10	12	13	11	11
(Denmark) J Groth	7	10	11	6
Q	(Japan) M Oikawa	11	12	7	11
(Sweden) A Källberg	9	8	7
(England) T Jarvis	11	11	11

Second round
3	(Brazil) H Calderano	11	11	11
(Egypt) O Assar	8	6	5
(India) M Shah	13	4	11	11
16	(United States) K Jha	11	11	6	8
9/WC	(China) Xiang P	11	14	11
Q	(Japan) M Oikawa	7	12	9
(England) T Jarvis	13	10	8	7
7	(China) Wen RB	11	12	11	11

Third round
3	(Brazil) H Calderano	10	11	7	11	11
(India) M Shah	12	8	11	7	6
9/WC	(China) Xiang P	6	11	11	14
7	(China) Wen RB	11	8	9	12

Quarter-finals
3	(Brazil) H Calderano	12	11	4	11
9/WC	(China) Xiang P	10	8	11	9

=== Bottom half ===
==== Section 3 ====
First round
(Chinese Taipei) Kuo G-h	7	8	11	11	11
(Nigeria) Q Aruna	11	11	8	9	7
(South Korea) Oh J-s	5	11	11	6
(Czech Republic) L Jančařík	11	8	13	11
Q	(Japan) S Aida	11	8	4	9
(Hong Kong) Wong C T	8	11	11	11
(South Korea) Park Ga-h	9	8	6
(Chinese Taipei) Feng Y-h	11	11	11

Second round
8/WC	(Germany) B Duda	7	7	8
(Chinese Taipei) Kuo G-h	11	11	11
(Czech Republic) L Jančařík	10	8	11	3
11/WC	(Germany) P Franziska	12	11	6	11
14	(China) Chen YY	11	4	11	9	8
(Hong Kong) Wong C T	4	11	7	11	11
(Chinese Taipei) Feng Y-h	7	12	12	7
4	(Germany) D Qiu	11	14	10	11

Third round
(Chinese Taipei) Kuo G-h	11	11	2	6	11
11/WC	(Germany) P Franziska	5	7	11	11	4
(Hong Kong) Wong C T	7	18	10
4	(Germany) D Qiu	11	20	12

Quarter-finals
(Chinese Taipei) Kuo G-h	9	5	11
4	(Germany) D Qiu	11	11	13

==== Section 4 ====
First round
(Croatia) T Pucar	10	11	3	8
Q	(South Korea) Park Gy-h	12	4	11	11
(India) M Thakkar	4	9	14	7
Q	(China) Yuan LC	11	11	12	11
WC	(Slovenia) D Kožul	11	9	11	11	10
(France) J Seyfried	13	11	7	8	12
(Japan) Y Uda	11	11	7	11
Q	(Japan) R Yoshiyama	7	5	11	3

Second round
5	(France) A Lebrun	9	11	6	11	6
Q	(South Korea) Park Gy-h	11	6	11	6	11
Q	(China) Yuan LC	1	5	12
10	(Japan) S Togami	11	11	14
15	(Germany) D Ovtcharov	11	8	11	13
(France) J Seyfried	2	11	9	11
(Japan) Y Uda	6	11	17	11
2	(China) Lin SD	11	9	15	6

Third round
Q	(South Korea) Park Gy-h	4	6	13	6
10	(Japan) S Togami	11	11	11	11
15	(Germany) D Ovtcharov	6	10	11	11	11
(Japan) Y Uda	11	12	8	3	9

Quarter-finals
10	(Japan) S Togami	11	11	11
15	(Germany) D Ovtcharov	9	3	7

== Women's singles ==
=== Seeds ===
1. (Japan) Miwa Harimoto (semi-finals)
2. (Macau) Zhu Yuling (final)
3. (China) Chen Yi (second round)
4. (China) Kuai Man (third round)
5. (Germany) Sabine Winter (third round)
6. (Japan) Satsuki Odo (third round)
7. (South Korea) Shin Yu-bin (semi-finals)
8. (Japan) Hina Hayata (champion)
9. (China) Shi Xunyao (quarter-finals)
10. (Japan) Miyu Nagasaki (third round)
11. (South Korea) Joo Cheon-hui (third round)
12. (Puerto Rico) Adriana Díaz (quarter-finals)
13. (Japan) Hitomi Sato (second round)
14. (Chinese Taipei) Cheng I-ching (third round)
15. (Brazil) Bruna Takahashi (third round)
16. (Romania) Bernadette Szőcs (second round)

=== Finals ===
Semi-finals
1	(Japan) Miwa Harimoto	9	13	9
8	(Japan) Hina Hayata	11	15	11
7	(South Korea) Shin Yu-bin	8	10	7
2	(Macau) Zhu Yuling	11	12	11

Final
8	(Japan) Hina Hayata	8	13	9	11	12	10	11
2	(Macau) Zhu Yuling	11	11	11	9	10	12	9

=== Top half ===
==== Section 1 ====
First round
(Singapore) Zeng J	5	9	11	10
(Egypt) D Meshref	11	11	9	12
Q	(India) Y Ghorpade	6	11	11	10	9
(Romania) A Dragoman	11	6	5	12	11
(France) P Pavade	9	11	6	6
Q	(China) Xu Y	11	5	11	11
(Japan) M Hirano	11	11	11
(Croatia) L Rakovac	6	3	9

Second round
1	(Japan) M Harimoto	12	11	11
(Egypt) D Meshref	10	9	9
(Romania) A Dragoman	12	9	9
15	(Brazil) B Takahashi	14	11	11
12/WC	(Puerto Rico) A Díaz	13	11	11
Q	(China) Xu Y	11	6	7
(Japan) M Hirano	4	11	6	8
5	(Germany) S Winter	11	9	11	11

Third round
1	(Japan) M Harimoto	13	11	11	11
15	(Brazil) B Takahashi	11	13	7	8
12/WC	(Puerto Rico) A Díaz	11	11	11
5	(Germany) S Winter	7	4	1

Quarter-finals
1	(Japan) M Harimoto	11	11	11
12/WC	(Puerto Rico) A Díaz	8	8	7

==== Section 2 ====
First round
Q	(China) Yang YY	13	5	11	2
(India) M Batra	15	11	5	11
(South Korea) Kim N-y	6	7	8
Q	(China) Fan SH	11	11	11
WC	(Japan) K Akae	11	12	11
(Ukraine) M Pesotska	7	10	7
(India) S Akula	11	11	11
(China) Qin YX	7	7	7

Second round
4	(China) Kuai M	11	7	11	11
(India) M Batra	9	11	8	7
Q	(China) Fan SH	11	11	8	12
13	(Japan) H Sato	7	7	11	10
11/WC	(South Korea) Joo C-h	12	11	5	11
WC	(Japan) K Akae	10	8	11	6
(India) S Akula	8	6	7
8	(Japan) H Hayata	11	11	11

Third round
4	(China) Kuai M	9	11	3	8
Q	(China) Fan SH	11	8	11	11
11/WC	(South Korea) Joo C-h	12	8	7	11	8
8	(Japan) H Hayata	10	11	11	8	11

Quarter-finals
Q	(China) Fan SH	5	4	11	6
8	(Japan) H Hayata	11	11	5	11

=== Bottom half ===
==== Section 3 ====
First round
Q	(South Korea) Yoo Y-r	10	11	11	8	11
(France) J N Yuan	12	7	8	11	9
(Canada) M Zhang	11	11	12
(Japan) S Yokoi	9	2	10
(France) C Lutz	6	5	7
Q	(Japan) S Aoki	11	11	11
(Japan) M Kihara	11	11	11
(Poland) N Bajor	7	6	5

Second round
7	(South Korea) Shin Y-b	11	11	11
Q	(South Korea) Yoo Y-r	2	9	7
(Canada) M Zhang	10	3	11	11
10/WC	(Japan) M Nagasaki	12	11	7	13
16	(Romania) B Szőcs	8	11	12	11	6
Q	(Japan) S Aoki	11	7	10	13	11
(Japan) M Kihara	11	11	11	11
3	(China) Chen Y	9	13	7	8

Third round
7	(South Korea) Shin Y-b	11	11	5	11
10/WC	(Japan) M Nagasaki	9	7	11	4
Q	(Japan) S Aoki	9	9	9
(Japan) M Kihara	11	11	11

Quarter-finals
7	(South Korea) Shin Y-b	3	12	6	11	11
(Japan) M Kihara	11	10	11	4	6

==== Section 4 ====
First round
(China) He ZJ	11	11	11
(South Korea) Lee E-h	2	3	2
Q	(China) Zhu SB	9	15	11	14
(Germany) A Kaufmann	11	13	3	12
(Romania) E Samara	7	11	13	7
(Austria) S Polcanova	11	9	15	11
WC	(Slovenia) A Tofant	11	6	4	11	6
Q	(Monaco) X Yang	8	11	11	4	11

Second round
6	(Japan) S Odo	9	7	11	11	11
(China) He ZJ	11	11	7	5	6
Q	(China) Zhu SB	11	5	6
9/WC	(China) Shi XY	13	11	11
14	(Chinese Taipei) Cheng I-c	11	11	6	11
(Austria) S Polcanova	9	4	11	6
Q	(Monaco) X Yang	5	5	7
2	(Macau) Zhu YL	11	11	11

Third round
6	(Japan) S Odo	9	11	8	11	7
9/WC	(China) Shi XY	11	4	11	9	11
14	(Chinese Taipei) Cheng I-c	11	2	7	11	6
2	(Macau) Zhu YL	9	11	11	7	11

Quarter-finals
9/WC	(China) Shi XY	7	8	5
2	(Macau) Zhu YL	11	11	11

== Men's doubles ==
=== Seeds ===
1. (France) Alexis Lebrun / (France) Félix Lebrun (first round)
2. (Hong Kong) Wong Chun Ting / (Hong Kong) Baldwin Chan (quarter-finals)
3. (China) Wen Ruibo / (China) Huang Youzheng (final)
4. (India) Manav Thakkar / (India) Manush Shah (quarter-finals)

=== Finals ===
Semi-finals
(South Korea) Lim Jong-hoon (South Korea) Oh Jun-sung	9	6	6
(Japan) Shunsuke Togami (Japan) Hiroto Shinozuka	11	11	11
3	(China) Wen Ruibo (China) Huang Youzheng	11	11	11
Q	(China) Xiang Peng (China) Chen Junsong	5	6	6

Final
(Japan) Shunsuke Togami (Japan) Hiroto Shinozuka	11	7	11	9	11
3	(China) Wen Ruibo (China) Huang Youzheng	4	11	3	11	5

=== Top half ===
First round
1	(France) A Lebrun (France) F Lebrun	14	15	10	7
Q	(Japan) R Yoshiyama (Japan) H Kobayashi	16	13	12	11
Q	(Singapore) J Chua (Hong Kong) Kwan M H	9	3	8
(South Korea) Lim J-h (South Korea) Oh J-s	11	11	11
4	(India) M Thakkar (India) M Shah	5	11	11	11
(France) L de Nodrest (France) J Rolland	11	6	8	4
(China) Lin SD (China) Yuan LC	6	10	5
(Japan) S Togami (Japan) H Shinozuka	11	12	11

Quarter-finals
Q	(Japan) R Yoshiyama (Japan) H Kobayashi	6	8	12
(South Korea) Lim J-h (South Korea) Oh J-s	11	11	14
4	(India) M Thakkar (India) M Shah	11	11	5	9
(Japan) S Togami (Japan) H Shinozuka	13	8	11	11

Semi-finals
(South Korea) Lim J-h (South Korea) Oh J-s	9	6	6
(Japan) S Togami (Japan) H Shinozuka	11	11	11

=== Bottom half ===
First round
(South Korea) Park Ga-h (South Korea) An J-h	11	11	11
Q	(France) S Gauzy (France) T Poret	7	9	8
WC	(Slovenia) P Hribar (Slovenia) M Podobnik	1	11	5
3	(China) Wen RB (China) Huang YZ	11	13	11
Q	(China) Xiang P (China) Chen JS	5	11	11	2	11
WC	(Slovenia) D Jorgić (Slovenia) D Kožul	11	4	3	11	7
(Singapore) K Pang (Singapore) I Quek	9	13	11	2	7
2	(Hong Kong) Wong C T (Hong Kong) B Chan	11	11	7	11	11

Quarter-finals
(South Korea) Park Ga-h (South Korea) An J-h	4	15	10
3	(China) Wen RB (China) Huang YZ	11	17	12
Q	(China) Xiang P (China) Chen JS	11	11	4	11
2	(Hong Kong) Wong C T (Hong Kong) B Chan	6	8	11	7

Semi-finals
3	(China) Wen RB (China) Huang YZ	11	11	11
Q	(China) Xiang P (China) Chen JS	5	6	6

== Women's doubles ==
=== Seeds ===
1. (Japan) Miwa Harimoto / (Japan) Hina Hayata (champions)
2. (Japan) Satsuki Odo / (Japan) Sakura Yokoi (final)
3. (South Korea) Shin Yu-bin / (South Korea) Joo Cheon-hui (first round)
4. (China) Chen Yi / (China) Kuai Man (semi-finals)

=== Finals ===
Semi-finals
1	(Japan) Miwa Harimoto (Japan) Hina Hayata	3	11	11	11	11
4	(China) Chen Yi (China) Kuai Man	11	13	7	9	8
Q	(Germany) Annett Kaufmann (Germany) Sabine Winter	5	5	7
2	(Japan) Satsuki Odo (Japan) Sakura Yokoi	11	11	11

Final
1	(Japan) Miwa Harimoto (Japan) Hina Hayata	11	11	12
2	(Japan) Satsuki Odo (Japan) Sakura Yokoi	8	5	10

=== Top half ===
First round
1	(Japan) M Harimoto (Japan) H Hiyata	11	12	11
Q	(Austria) S Polcanova (France) J N Yuan	3	10	3
(India) D Chitale (India) Y Ghorpade	9	9	11	8
(Japan) H Sato (Japan) S Shibata	11	11	7	11
4	(China) Chen Y (China) Kuai M	11	11	11
Q	(Romania) A Dragoman (Romania) A Diaconu	6	6	8
(China) Qin YX (China) Zong GM	12	11	11	11
(South Korea) Kim N-y (South Korea) Lee E-h	14	9	9	3

Quarter-finals
1	(Japan) M Harimoto (Japan) H Hiyata	11	12	11
(Japan) H Sato (Japan) S Shibata	2	10	8
4	(China) Chen Y (China) Kuai M	5	11	5	11	11
(China) Qin YX (China) Zong GM	11	9	11	5	6

Semi-finals
1	(Japan) M Harimoto (Japan) H Hiyata	3	11	11	11	11
4	(China) Chen Y (China) Kuai M	11	13	7	9	8

=== Bottom half ===
First round
WC	(Serbia) S Surjan (Serbia) I Lupulesku	6	12	13	11
(China) Han FE (China) Shi XY	11	10	11	8
Q	(Germany) A Kaufmann (Germany) S Winter	11	11	6	4	11
3	(South Korea) Shin Y-b (South Korea) Joo C-h	9	6	11	11	4
(Romania) B Szőcs (Romania) E Samara	11	11	11
Q	(Singapore) Ser L Q (Singapore) Zeng J	7	5	4
WC	(Slovenia) A Tofant (Slovenia) K Stražar	8	4	5
2	(Japan) S Odo (Japan) S Yokoi	11	11	11

Quarter-finals
WC	(Serbia) S Surjan (Serbia) I Lupulesku	9	8	6
Q	(Germany) A Kaufmann (Germany) S Winter	11	11	11
(Romania) B Szőcs (Romania) E Samara	7	12	9	8
2	(Japan) S Odo (Japan) S Yokoi	11	10	11	11

Semi-finals
Q	(Germany) A Kaufmann (Germany) S Winter	5	5	7
2	(Japan) S Odo (Japan) S Yokoi	11	11	11

== Mixed doubles ==
=== Seeds ===
1. (South Korea) Lim Jong-hoon / (South Korea) Shin Yu-bin (champions)
2. (Brazil) Hugo Calderano / (Brazil) Bruna Takahashi (quarter-finals)
3. (India) Manush Shah / (India) Diya Chitale (semi-finals)
4. (China) Huang Youzheng / (China) Chen Yi (semi-finals)

=== Finals ===
Semi-finals
1	(South Korea) Lim Jong-hoon (South Korea) Shin Yu-bin	11	12	11
4	(China) Huang Youzheng (China) Chen Yi	7	10	6
3	(India) Manush Shah (India) Diya Chitale	0	3	8
(Germany) Dang Qiu (Germany) Sabine Winter	11	11	11

Final
1	(South Korea) Lim Jong-hoon (South Korea) Shin Yu-bin	11	11	6	11
(Germany) Dang Qiu (Germany) Sabine Winter	3	7	11	7

=== Top half ===
First round
1	(South Korea) Lim J-h (South Korea) Shin Y-b	11	11	8	11
Q	(China) Wen RB (China) Kuai M	9	4	11	6
(Japan) S Aida (Japan) H Sato	11	11	13
(Romania) E Ionescu (Romania) B Szőcs	1	7	11
4	(China) Huang YZ (China) Chen Y	11	14	11
Q	(Slovakia) Ľ Pištej (Slovakia) T Kukulkova	4	12	8
(Japan) S Togami (Japan) S Odo	6	11	11	11
Q	(Croatia) I Ban (Croatia) H Arapović	11	5	9	3

Quarter-finals
1	(South Korea) Lim J-h (South Korea) Shin Y-b	11	11	11
(Japan) S Aida (Japan) H Sato	7	8	9
4	(China) Huang YZ (China) Chen Y	8	11	8	14	12
(Japan) S Togami (Japan) S Odo	11	7	11	12	10

Semi-finals
1	(South Korea) Lim J-h (South Korea) Shin Y-b	11	12	11
4	(China) Huang YZ (China) Chen Y	7	10	6

=== Bottom half ===
First round
Q	(South Korea) Oh J-s (South Korea) Joo C-h	11	9	9	7
(Hong Kong) Yiu K T (Slovakia) B Várady	6	11	11	11
WC	(Slovenia) P Hribar (Slovenia) A Tofant	4	7	8
3	(India) M Shah (India) D Chitale	11	11	11
WC	(Slovenia) M Podobnik (Slovenia) K Stražar	4	2	8
(Germany) D Qiu (Germany) S Winter	11	11	11
(Singapore) K Pang (Singapore) Zeng J	11	5	10	7
2	(Brazil) H Calderano (Brazil) B Takahashi	9	11	12	11

Quarter-finals
(Hong Kong) Yiu K T (Slovakia) B Várady	10	11	12	8	8
3	(India) M Shah (India) D Chitale	12	9	10	11	11
(Germany) D Qiu (Germany) S Winter	11	11	6	11
2	(Brazil) H Calderano (Brazil) B Takahashi	7	7	11	8

Semi-finals
3	(India) M Shah (India) D Chitale	0	3	8
(Germany) D Qiu (Germany) S Winter	11	11	11

Preceded by WTT Contender Zagreb 2026	2026 WTT Series	Succeeded by United States Smash 2026
