= WTT Contender Zagreb 2026 =

Table tennis tournament in Croatia

Tournament details
- Dates: 9–14 June
- Edition: 5th
- Total prize money: US$100,000
- Venue: Arena Zagreb
- Location: Zagreb, Croatia

Champions
- Men's singles: (South Korea) Lim Jong-hoon
- Women's singles: (Japan) Miwa Harimoto
- Men's doubles: (South Korea) Lim Jong-hoon (South Korea) Oh Jun-sung
- Women's doubles: (Japan) Miwa Harimoto (Japan) Satsuki Odo
- Mixed doubles: (Hong Kong) Wong Chun Ting (Hong Kong) Doo Hoi Kem

The WTT Contender Zagreb 2026 is a table tennis tournament that take place at the Arena Zagreb, Zagreb, Croatia, from 9 to 14 June and have a total prize of US$100,000.

== Tournament ==
The WTT Contender Zagreb 2026 is the eleventh tournament of the 2026 WTT Series and is part of the WTT Contender event.

=== Venue ===
This tournament is held at the Arena Zagreb in Zagreb, Croatia.

=== Point distribution ===
Below is the point distribution table for each phase of the tournament based on the WTT World Ranking for the WTT Contender event.

Event	Winner	Finalist	Semi-finalist	Quarter-finalist	Round of 16	Round of 32
Singles	400	280	180	120	30	4
Doubles	400	280	180	45	4	—

=== Prize pool ===
The total prize money is US$100,000 with the distribution of the prize money in accordance with WTT regulations.

Event	Winner	Finalist	Semi-finalist	Quarter-finalist	Round of 16	Round of 32
Singles	$5,000	$2,500	$1,275	$1,025	$825	$650
Doubles	$2,500	$1,500	$950	$550	$350	—

== Men's singles ==
=== Seeds ===
1. (China) Lin Shidong (second round)
2. (Germany) Dang Qiu (semi-finals)
3. (China) Wen Ruibo (second round)
4. (Slovenia) Darko Jorgić (first round)
5. (China) Xiang Peng (first round)
6. (Germany) Dimitrij Ovtcharov (first round)
7. (China) Chen Yuanyu (semi-finals)
8. (South Korea) An Jae-hyun (final)

=== Finals ===
Semi-finals
8	(South Korea) An Jae-hyun	7	12	11	11
7	(China) Chen Yuanyu	11	10	4	8
Q	(South Korea) Lim Jong-hoon	11	5	12	11
2	(Germany) Dang Qiu	9	11	10	5

Final
8	(South Korea) An Jae-hyun	17	11	8	11	6	8
Q	(South Korea) Lim Jong-hoon	19	7	11	7	11	11

=== Top half ===
==== Section 1 ====
First round
1	(China) Lin SD	11	11	11
(Czech Republic) L Jančařík	9	3	5
(Japan) Y Tanaka	8	11	14	8	7
(China) Chen JS	11	4	12	11	11
(Japan) M Yoshimura	8	13	4
(Individual Neutral Athletes) V Sidorenko	11	15	11
Q	(Chinese Taipei) Feng Y-h	8	8	11	11
8	(South Korea) An J-h	11	11	8	13

Second round
1	(China) Lin SD	11	9	9	11	14
(China) Chen JS	7	11	11	5	16
(Individual Neutral Athletes) V Sidorenko	11	9	11	11
8	(South Korea) An J-h	13	11	3	13

Quarter-finals
(China) Chen JS	10	6	9
8	(South Korea) An J-h	12	11	11

==== Section 2 ====
First round
3	(China) Wen RB	11	11	8	11
Q	(Japan) K Hamada	8	8	11	4
(Japan) H Shinozuka	11	11	12	11
Q	(Japan) M Oikawa	9	6	14	0
Q	(Belgium) A Rassenfosse	5	11	8	11	4
(Japan) Y Uda	11	9	11	8	11
Q	(Chinese Taipei) Kuo G-h	8	20	8	7
7	(China) Chen YY	11	18	11	11

Second round
3	(China) Wen RB	3	13	11	11	10
(Japan) H Shinozuka	11	15	7	5	12
(Japan) Y Uda	9	7	9
7	(China) Chen YY	11	11	11

Quarter-finals
(Japan) H Shinozuka	11	10	8	12
7	(China) Chen YY	5	12	11	14

=== Bottom half ===
==== Section 3 ====
First round
6	(Germany) D Ovtcharov	6	11	10	4
Q	(South Korea) Lim J-h	11	8	12	11
Q	(Germany) W Verdonschot	7	11	11	9	11
WC	(Croatia) A Gaćina	11	7	8	11	5
(Croatia) T Pucar	11	6	12	5	11
WC	(Croatia) F Zeljko	6	11	10	11	8
(India) M Thakkar	10	11	11	12
4	(Slovenia) D Jorgić	12	9	8	10

Second round
Q	(South Korea) Lim J-h	5	11	11	7	11
Q	(Germany) W Verdonschot	11	8	1	11	6
(Croatia) T Pucar	11	6	15	11
(India) M Thakkar	8	11	13	3

Quarter-finals
Q	(South Korea) Lim J-h	11	6	11	11
(Croatia) T Pucar	7	11	5	5

==== Section 4 ====
First round
5/WC	(China) Xiang P	10	6	5
(South Korea) Park G-h	12	11	11
(Sweden) A Källberg	10	12	8
(South Korea) Oh J-s	12	14	11
(Romania) E Ionescu	11	4	6	4
Q	(India) A Bhattacharjee	9	11	11	11
WC	(Croatia) I Ban	8	6	11
2	(Germany) D Qiu	11	11	13

Second round
(South Korea) Park G-h	16	8	11	11
(South Korea) Oh J-s	14	11	8	7
Q	(India) A Bhattacharjee	7	12	6	6
2	(Germany) D Qiu	11	10	11	11

Quarter-finals
(South Korea) Park G-h	7	11	10	8
2	(Germany) D Qiu	11	9	12	11

== Women's singles ==
=== Seeds ===
1. (Japan) Miwa Harimoto (champion)
2. (Macau) Zhu Yuling (final)
3. (China) Chen Yi (quarter-finals)
4. (Japan) Satsuki Odo (semi-finals)
5. (Japan) Hina Hayata (second round)
6. (Egypt) Hana Goda (first round)
7. (Japan) Hitomi Sato (quarter-finals)
8. (Japan) Miyuu Kihara (quarter-finals)

=== Finals ===
Semi-finals
1	(Japan) Miwa Harimoto	11	11	7	11
4/WC	(Japan) Satsuki Odo	7	6	11	5
(Japan) Sakura Yokoi	11	8	6	5
2	(Macau) Zhu Yuling	8	11	11	11

Final
1	(Japan) Miwa Harimoto	11	11	11	9	9	7	12
2	(Macau) Zhu Yuling	2	6	9	11	11	11	10

=== Top half ===
==== Section 1 ====
First round
1	(Japan) M Harimoto	11	11	11
Q	(Germany) A Kaufmann	9	7	3
Q	(China) Han FE	11	6	5	6
WC	(Croatia) H Arapović	7	11	11	11
(Austria) S Polcanova	11	6	11	11
(South Korea) Kim N-y	8	11	8	8
(United States) L Zhang	8	5	11	7
7	(Japan) H Sato	11	11	5	11

Second round
1	(Japan) M Harimoto	11	11	11
WC	(Croatia) H Arapović	4	9	1
(Austria) S Polcanova	4	3	12
7	(Japan) H Sato	11	11	14

Quarter-finals
1	(Japan) M Harimoto	11	11	11
7	(Japan) H Sato	3	3	1

==== Section 2 ====
First round
4/WC	(Japan) S Odo	12	11	11
Q	(Sweden) C Källberg	10	4	5
(India) S Akula	6	11	8	1
(Wales) A Hursey	11	9	11	11
Q	(Japan) C Muramatsu	7	11	2	5
(Japan) M Hirano	11	8	11	11
Q	(Germany) X Shan	13	5	11	5	11
6/WC	(Egypt) H Goda	11	11	9	11	8

Second round
4/WC	(Japan) S Odo	11	11	11
(Wales) A Hursey	4	8	5
(Japan) M Hirano	11	11	5	11
Q	(Germany) X Shan	7	5	11	1

Quarter-finals
4/WC	(Japan) S Odo	11	11	11
(Japan) M Hirano	7	7	4

=== Bottom half ===
==== Section 3 ====
First round
5	(Japan) H Hayata	11	8	11	11
(China) Qin YX	2	11	2	7
(Japan) S Yokoi	11	11	11
WC	(Croatia) I Malobabić	8	6	8
(South Korea) Lee E-h	6	5	11	11	11
Q	(Monaco) X Yang	11	11	7	8	6
(Chinese Taipei) Yeh Y-t	6	13	5
3	(China) Chen Y	11	15	11

Second round
5	(Japan) H Hayata	4	11	7	7
(Japan) S Yokoi	11	3	11	11
(South Korea) Lee E-h	11	8	8	6
3	(China) Chen Y	8	11	11	11

Quarter-finals
(Japan) S Yokoi	5	13	12	8	11
3	(China) Chen Y	11	11	10	11	6

==== Section 4 ====
First round
8	(Japan) M Kihara	11	11	11
Q	(Portugal) F Yu	8	5	5
Q	(China) Fan SH	4	5	9
(Hong Kong) Doo H K	11	11	11
WC	(Croatia) L Rakovac	11	5	10	11	7
(Singapore) Zeng J	9	11	12	8	11
(China) He ZJ	12	11	7	11
2	(Macau) Zhu YL	14	7	11	13

Second round
8	(Japan) M Kihara	10	11	11	10	11
(Hong Kong) Doo H K	12	5	2	12	4
(Singapore) Zeng J	9	12	4
2	(Macau) Zhu YL	11	14	11

Quarter-finals
8	(Japan) M Kihara	6	15	11	2
2	(Macau) Zhu YL	11	17	9	11

== Men's doubles ==
=== Seeds ===
1. (China) Lin Shidong / (China) Huang Youzheng (final)
2. (Hong Kong) Wong Chun Ting / (Hong Kong) Baldwin Chan (first round)
3. (South Korea) Lim Jong-hoon / (South Korea) Oh Jun-sung (champions)
4. (Singapore) Koen Pang / (Singapore) Izaac Quek (first round)

=== Finals ===
Semi-finals
1	(China) Lin Shidong (China) Huang Youzheng	11	5	11	11
WC	(Croatia) Andrej Gaćina (Croatia) Ivor Ban	8	11	4	3
3	(South Korea) Lim Jong-hoon (South Korea) Oh Jun-sung	10	11	5	11	11
(China) Wen Ruibo (China) Yuan Licen	12	4	11	5	9

Final
1	(China) Lin Shidong (China) Huang Youzheng	13	5	9
3	(South Korea) Lim Jong-hoon (South Korea) Oh Jun-sung	15	11	11

=== Top half ===
First round
1	(China) Lin SD (China) Huang YZ	11	11	8	11
Q	(China) Chen YY (China) Chen JS	8	8	11	9
Q	(Singapore) J Chua (Singapore) C Chew	8	14	5
(South Korea) An J-h (South Korea) Park G-h	11	16	11
4	(Singapore) K Pang (Singapore) I Quek	7	9	11	10
Q	(Chinese Taipei) Feng Y-h (Chinese Taipei) Kuo G-h	11	11	9	12
WC	(Croatia) A Gaćina (Croatia) I Ban	11	11	11
Q	(Hungary) C András (Hong Kong) Ho K K	2	8	6

Quarter-finals
1	(China) Lin SD (China) Huang YZ	9	9	11	11	11
(South Korea) An J-h (South Korea) Park G-h	11	11	9	3	8
Q	(Chinese Taipei) Feng Y-h (Chinese Taipei) Kuo G-h	7	11	6	9
WC	(Croatia) A Gaćina (Croatia) I Ban	11	6	11	11

Semi-finals
1	(China) Lin SD (China) Huang YZ	11	5	11	11
WC	(Croatia) A Gaćina (Croatia) I Ban	8	11	4	3

=== Bottom half ===
First round
WC	(Croatia) L Benko (Croatia) I Hencl	8	5	12	5
(Belgium) M Allegro (Belgium) A Rassenfosse	11	11	10	11
(Japan) S Togami (Japan) H Shinozuka	12	6	6	8
3	(South Korea) Lim J-h (South Korea) Oh J-s	10	11	11	11
(India) S Suravajjula (India) M Thakkar	8	9	11	11	12
(India) A Bhattacharjee (India) P Jain	11	11	7	9	10
(China) Wen RB (China) Yuan LC	11	13	12	11
2	(Hong Kong) Wong C T (Hong Kong) B Chan	9	11	14	2

Quarter-finals
(Belgium) M Allegro (Belgium) A Rassenfosse	4	5	8
3	(South Korea) Lim J-h (South Korea) Oh J-s	11	11	11
(India) S Suravajjula (India) M Thakkar	5	11	12	10
(China) Wen RB (China) Yuan LC	11	7	14	12

Semi-finals
3	(South Korea) Lim J-h (South Korea) Oh J-s	10	11	5	11	11
(China) Wen RB (China) Yuan LC	12	4	11	5	9

== Women's doubles ==
=== Seeds ===
1. (Japan) Miwa Harimoto / (Japan) Satsuki Odo (champions)
2. (South Korea) Ryu Han-na / (South Korea) Kim Na-yeong (quarter-finals)
3. (China) Chen Yi / (China) Kuai Man (semi-finals)
4. (Japan) Hitomi Sato / (Japan) Saki Shibata (semi-finals)

=== Finals ===
Semi-finals
1	(Japan) Miwa Harimoto (Japan) Satsuki Odo	11	9	11	11
3	(China) Chen Yi (China) Kuai Man	7	11	4	8
4	(Japan) Hitomi Sato (Japan) Saki Shibata	9	9	6
(South Korea) Lee Eun-hye (South Korea) Choi Hyo-joo	11	11	11

Final
1	(Japan) Miwa Harimoto (Japan) Satsuki Odo	11	13	11
(South Korea) Lee Eun-hye (South Korea) Choi Hyo-joo	5	11	7

=== Top half ===
First round
1	(Japan) M Harimoto (Japan) S Odo	11	11	11
(China) Han FE (China) Shi XY	5	8	6
(Germany) Y Wan (Germany) X Shan	3	12	6	8
Q	(Japan) M Hirano (Japan) M Kihara	11	10	11	11
3	(China) Chen Y (China) Kuai M	11	11	11
Q	(Austria) S Polcanova (Wales) A Hursey	6	7	4
Q	(South Korea) Lee D-e (South Korea) Choi S-y	9	11	11	6	11
(Hong Kong) Doo H K (Hong Kong) Ng W L	11	7	9	11	7

Quarter-finals
1	(Japan) M Harimoto (Japan) S Odo	7	11	9	11	11
Q	(Japan) M Hirano (Japan) M Kihara	11	6	11	9	2
3	(China) Chen Y (China) Kuai M	11	11	11
Q	(South Korea) Lee D-e (South Korea) Choi S-y	9	4	7

Semi-finals
1	(Japan) M Harimoto (Japan) S Odo	11	9	11	11
3	(China) Chen Y (China) Kuai M	7	11	4	8

=== Bottom half ===
First round
WC	(Croatia) L Rakovac (Croatia) H Arapović	6	11	11	7	11
Q	(Hong Kong) Kong T L (Hong Kong) Lee H M	11	8	4	11	8
(China) Qin YX (China) Zong GM	11	14	9	12	5
4	(Japan) H Sato (Japan) S Shibata	3	16	11	10	11
(Chinese Taipei) Chien T-c (Chinese Taipei) Tsai Y-e	11	10	6	8
(South Korea) Lee E-h (South Korea) Choi H-j	8	12	11	11
WC	(Croatia) I Malobabić (Croatia) A Pavlović	5	4	6
2	(South Korea) Ryu H-n (South Korea) Kim N-y	11	11	11

Quarter-finals
WC	(Croatia) L Rakovac (Croatia) H Arapović	1	8	11	7
4	(Japan) H Sato (Japan) S Shibata	11	11	9	11
(South Korea) Lee E-h (South Korea) Choi H-j	11	4	11	9	11
2	(South Korea) Ryu H-n (South Korea) Kim N-y	4	11	9	11	8

Semi-finals
4	(Japan) H Sato (Japan) S Shibata	9	9	6
(South Korea) Lee E-h (South Korea) Choi H-j	11	11	11

== Mixed doubles ==
=== Seeds ===
1. (Hong Kong) Wong Chun Ting / (Hong Kong) Doo Hoi Kem (champions)
2. (Spain) Álvaro Robles / (Spain) María Xiao (semi-finals)
3. (China) Yuan Licen / (China) Chen Yi (first round)
4. (Japan) Satoshi Aida / (Japan) Hitomi Sato (quarter-finals)

=== Finals ===
Semi-finals
1	(Hong Kong) Wong Chun Ting (Hong Kong) Doo Hoi Kem	11	11	11
Q	(England) Connor Green (England) Tin-Tin Ho	6	3	5
(Japan) Shunsuke Togami (Japan) Satsuki Odo	11	11	11
2	(Spain) Álvaro Robles (Spain) María Xiao	4	9	5

Final
1	(Hong Kong) Wong Chun Ting (Hong Kong) Doo Hoi Kem	10	7	11	11	11
(Japan) Shunsuke Togami (Japan) Satsuki Odo	12	11	6	4	9

=== Top half ===
First round
1	(Hong Kong) Wong C T (Hong Kong) Doo H K	11	4	11	10	11
(South Korea) Park G-h (South Korea) Kim N-y	3	11	5	12	8
(India) P Jain (India) S Das	6	6	11	13	5
(Hong Kong) Yiu K T (Hong Kong) Ng W L	11	11	8	11	11
3	(China) Yuan LC (China) Chen Y	9	8	11	11	8
WC	(China) Wen RB (China) Kuai M	11	11	9	6	11
Q	(England) C Green (England) T T Ho	5	9	11	11	11
(Germany) D Qiu (Germany) A Kaufmann	11	11	5	9	7

Quarter-finals
1	(Hong Kong) Wong C T (Hong Kong) Doo H K	12	11	11
(Hong Kong) Yiu K T (Hong Kong) Ng W L	10	7	4
WC	(China) Wen RB (China) Kuai M	9	11	6	9
Q	(England) C Green (England) T T Ho	11	3	11	11

Semi-finals
1	(Hong Kong) Wong C T (Hong Kong) Doo H K	11	11	11
Q	(England) C Green (England) T T Ho	6	3	5

=== Bottom half ===
First round
Q	(India) M Thakkar (India) M Batra	13	4	4
(Japan) S Togami (Japan) S Odo	15	11	11
WC	(Croatia) I Ban (Croatia) H Arapović	11	8	2	9
4	(Japan) S Aida (Japan) H Sato	6	11	11	11
Q	(Croatia) B Petek (Croatia) A Pavlović	9	2	6
(Singapore) K Pang (Singapore) Zeng J	11	11	11
Q	(Norway) B Haug (Slovakia) T Kukulkova	6	5	12
2	(Spain) Á Robles (Spain) M Xiao	11	11	14

Quarter-finals
(Japan) S Togami (Japan) S Odo	11	11	11
4	(Japan) S Aida (Japan) H Sato	9	9	6
(Singapore) K Pang (Singapore) Zeng J	12	8	4
2	(Spain) Á Robles (Spain) M Xiao	14	11	11

Semi-finals
(Japan) S Togami (Japan) S Odo	11	11	11
2	(Spain) Á Robles (Spain) M Xiao	4	9	5

Preceded by WTT Contender Skopje 2026	2026 WTT Series	Succeeded by WTT Star Contender Ljubljana 2026
