= WTT Contender Lagos 2026 =

Table tennis tournament in Nigeria

Tournament details
- Dates: 19–24 May
- Edition: 4th
- Total prize money: US$100,000
- Venue: Sir Molade Okoya Thomas Indoor Sports Hall
- Location: Lagos, Nigeria

Champions
- Men's singles: (Denmark) Anders Lind
- Women's singles: (Japan) Satsuki Odo
- Men's doubles: (India) Manav Thakkar (India) Manush Shah
- Women's doubles: (Japan) Reina Aso (South Korea) Joo Cheon-hui
- Mixed doubles: (India) Manush Shah (India) Diya Chitale

The WTT Contender Lagos 2026 is a table tennis tournament that take place at the Sir Molade Okoya Thomas Indoor Sports Hall, Lagos, Nigeria, from 19 to 24 May and have a total prize of US$100,000.

== Tournament ==
The WTT Contender Lagos 2026 is the ninth tournament of the 2026 WTT Series and is part of the WTT Contender event.

=== Venue ===
This tournament is held at the Sir Molade Okoya Thomas Indoor Sports Hall in Lagos, Nigeria.

=== Point distribution ===
Below is the point distribution table for each phase of the tournament based on the WTT World Ranking for the WTT Contender event.

Event	Winner	Finalist	Semi-finalist	Quarter-finalist	Round of 16	Round of 32
Singles	400	280	180	120	30	4
Doubles	400	280	180	45	4	—

=== Prize pool ===
The total prize money is US$100,000 with the distribution of the prize money in accordance with WTT regulations.

Event	Winner	Finalist	Semi-finalist	Quarter-finalist	Round of 16	Round of 32
Singles	$5,000	$2,500	$1,275	$1,025	$825	$650
Doubles	$2,500	$1,500	$950	$550	$350	—

== Men's singles ==
=== Seeds ===
1. (Denmark) Anders Lind (champion)
2. (France) Thibault Poret (quarter-finals)
3. (South Korea) Oh Jun-sung (final)
4. (India) Manav Thakkar (quarter-finals)
5. (France) Joe Seyfried (first round)
6. (Portugal) João Geraldo (quarter-finals)
7. (India) Manush Shah (semi-finals)
8. (France) Lilian Bardet (quarter-finals)

=== Finals ===
Semi-finals
1	(Denmark) Anders Lind	5	11	11	8	11
(South Korea) Lim Jong-hoon	11	5	8	11	9
3	(South Korea) Oh Jun-sung	11	13	5	11
7	(India) Manush Shah	7	11	11	3

Final
1	(Denmark) Anders Lind	11	11	11	10	11
3	(South Korea) Oh Jun-sung	6	9	5	12	8

=== Top half ===
==== Section 1 ====
First round
1	(Denmark) A Lind	10	6	11	11	12
(Romania) I Chirita	12	11	3	9	10
Q	(India) M Dani	11	11	11
(Canada) E Ly	6	0	0
Q	(Nigeria) A Solanke	7	6	11	11	7
WC	(Benin) A-K Salifou	11	11	9	7	11
Q	(India) P Jain	12	8	9
6	(Portugal) J Geraldo	14	11	11

Second round
1	(Denmark) A Lind	9	11	11	11
Q	(India) M Dani	11	2	6	5
WC	(Benin) A-K Salifou	9	7	2
6	(Portugal) J Geraldo	11	11	11

Quarter-finals
1	(Denmark) A Lind	8	11	13	11
6	(Portugal) J Geraldo	11	5	11	7

==== Section 2 ====
First round
4	(India) M Thakkar	11	11	11
(India) H Desai	3	9	8
(India) A Bhattacharjee	11	11	12
(Nigeria) A Abdulfatai	8	6	10
(South Korea) Lim J-h	11	11	11
WC	(Nigeria) O Omotayo	9	3	8
(Japan) K Yoshimura	6	11	11	10	11
5	(France) J Seyfried	11	3	6	12	9

Second round
4	(India) M Thakkar	11	11	11
(India) A Bhattacharjee	9	4	3
(South Korea) Lim J-h	12	11	11
(Japan) K Yoshimura	10	9	9

Quarter-finals
4	(India) M Thakkar	14	11	7	11	10
(South Korea) Lim J-h	16	6	11	7	12

=== Bottom half ===
==== Section 3 ====
First round
8	(France) L Bardet	11	11	11
(Nigeria) T Mati	4	4	8
(Romania) A Istrate	14	11	12
Q	(Nigeria) M Adegoke	12	6	10
Q	(India) S Shetty	5	4	7
(France) L de Nodrest	11	11	11
Q	(Netherlands) G Camara	9	7	3
3	(South Korea) Oh J-s	11	11	11

Second round
8	(France) L Bardet	11	11	11
(Romania) A Istrate	9	5	6
(France) L de Nodrest	9	11	5	8
3	(South Korea) Oh J-s	11	5	11	11

Quarter-finals
8	(France) L Bardet	4	13	12
3	(South Korea) Oh J-s	11	15	14

==== Section 4 ====
First round
7	(India) M Shah	11	12	11	11
(Nigeria) M Kuti	6	14	4	5
Q	(Nigeria) M Fanbumi	12	10	6	9
Q	(Nigeria) S Agunbiade	10	12	11	11
Q	(Netherlands) M de Boer	11	10	8	11
WC	(South Korea) Kim G-a	9	12	11	13
(Belgium) M Allegro	10	11	11	8	8
2	(France) T Poret	12	9	4	11	11

Second round
7	(India) M Shah	12	12	8	11
Q	(Nigeria) S Agunbiade	10	10	11	5
WC	(South Korea) Kim G-a	11	10	5	7
2	(France) T Poret	7	12	11	11

Quarter-finals
7	(India) M Shah	11	4	11	11	11
2	(France) T Poret	8	11	3	13	4

== Women's singles ==
=== Seeds ===
1. (Japan) Satsuki Odo (champion)
2. (Japan) Honoka Hashimoto (final)
3. (South Korea) Joo Cheon-hui (semi-finals)
4. (Japan) Hitomi Sato (semi-finals)
5. (Romania) Elizabeta Samara (quarter-finals)
6. (Egypt) Dina Meshref (first round)
7. (India) Manika Batra (second round)
8. (Canada) Mo Zhang (second round)

=== Finals ===
Semi-finals
1	(Japan) Satsuki Odo	11	11	9	12
4	(Japan) Hitomi Sato	6	6	11	10
3	(South Korea) Joo Cheon-hui	7	4	6
2	(Japan) Honoka Hashimoto	11	11	11

Final
1	(Japan) Satsuki Odo	11	5	11	11	11
2	(Japan) Honoka Hashimoto	3	11	3	6	4

=== Top half ===
==== Section 1 ====
First round
1	(Japan) S Odo	11	11	11
WC	(Nigeria) A Odusanya	5	2	3
(Italy) D Vivarelli	11	11	11
(Nigeria) A Ojomu	4	5	5
(India) S Mukherjee	8	5	6
(Portugal) J Shao	11	11	11
(Japan) R Aso	4	14	4	8
7	(India) M Batra	11	12	11	11

Second round
1	(Japan) S Odo	11	11	11
(Italy) D Vivarelli	5	6	4
(Portugal) J Shao	11	11	11	11
7	(India) M Batra	8	13	9	8

Quarter-finals
1	(Japan) S Odo	11	11	11
(Portugal) J Shao	6	5	5

==== Section 2 ====
First round
4	(Japan) H Sato	11	11	11
Q	(Nigeria) K Okanlawon	3	2	3
Q	(Nigeria) A Sezuo	8	7	6
(Nigeria) F Bello	11	11	11
Q	(Nigeria) H Udoaka	4	3	3
(India) D Chitale	11	11	11
(France) C Lutz	11	11	3	11
6	(Egypt) D Meshref	7	2	11	4

Second round
4	(Japan) H Sato	11	11	11
(Nigeria) F Bello	2	1	1
(India) D Chitale	12	7	8	11	11
(France) C Lutz	10	11	11	8	8

Quarter-finals
4	(Japan) H Sato	11	11	11
(India) D Chitale	9	7	5

=== Bottom half ===
==== Section 3 ====
First round
5	(Romania) E Samara	11	12	11
Q	(India) N Mani	8	10	5
(Germany) F Schreiner	11	11	11
Q	(Nigeria) A Ajuwon	6	3	5
(Italy) G Monfardini	11	11	9	5	5
(Japan) S Shibata	9	7	11	11	11
WC	(Nigeria) F Ojo	3	4	5
3	(South Korea) Joo C-h	11	11	11

Second round
5	(Romania) E Samara	9	14	3	14	13
(Germany) F Schreiner	11	12	11	12	11
(Japan) S Shibata	9	5	11	11
3	(South Korea) Joo C-h	11	11	7	13

Quarter-finals
5	(Romania) E Samara	6	8	2
3	(South Korea) Joo C-h	11	11	11

==== Section 4 ====
First round
8	(Canada) M Zhang	11	11	11
(Chile) P Vega	3	9	4
(India) A Mukherjee	12	11	11
Q	(Slovenia) A Tofant	10	5	7
Q	(India) S Das	11	11	11
WC	(India) Y Ghorpade	8	5	6
Q	(India) S Saini	3	1	3
2	(Japan) H Hashimoto	11	11	11

Second round
8	(Canada) M Zhang	2	4	10
(India) A Mukherjee	11	11	12
Q	(India) S Das	9	5	5
2	(Japan) H Hashimoto	11	11	11

Quarter-finals
(India) A Mukherjee	7	5	1
2	(Japan) H Hashimoto	11	11	11

== Men's doubles ==
=== Seeds ===
1. (India) Manav Thakkar / (India) Manush Shah (champions)
2. (India) Ankur Bhattacharjee / (India) Payas Jain (quarter-finals)
3. (France) Lilian Bardet / (France) Thibault Poret (semi-finals)
4. (Nigeria) Taiwo Mati / (Nigeria) Matthew Kuti (semi-finals)

=== Finals ===
Semi-finals
1	(India) Manav Thakkar (India) Manush Shah	11	11	11
4	(Nigeria) Taiwo Mati (Nigeria) Matthew Kuti	4	6	9
3	(France) Lilian Bardet (France) Thibault Poret	8	5	5
WC	(Romania) Iulian Chirita (Romania) Andrei Istrate	11	11	11

Final
1	(India) Manav Thakkar (India) Manush Shah	11	12	11
WC	(Romania) Iulian Chirita (Romania) Andrei Istrate	7	10	4

=== Top half ===
First round
1	(India) M Thakkar (India) M Shah	11	11	11
(Nigeria) A Abdulfatai (Nigeria) M Fanbumi	9	3	5
WC	(India) M Dani (India) S Shetty	7	12	11	10	12
Q	(Nigeria) U Ayoola (Nigeria) J Samson	11	10	9	12	10
4	(Nigeria) T Mati (Nigeria) M Kuti	11	11	11
(Ghana) E Quarcoo (Ghana) K Addo	9	6	6
Q	(Nigeria) D Fayele (Nigeria) A Lawal	11	11	11
(Ghana) J Marfo (Ghana) F Antwi	9	9	8

Quarter-finals
1	(India) M Thakkar (India) M Shah	11	11	11
WC	(India) M Dani (India) S Shetty	7	4	6
4	(Nigeria) T Mati (Nigeria) M Kuti	11	10	11	11
Q	(Nigeria) D Fayele (Nigeria) A Lawal	4	12	5	7

Semi-finals
1	(India) M Thakkar (India) M Shah	11	11	11
4	(Nigeria) T Mati (Nigeria) M Kuti	4	6	9

=== Bottom half ===
First round
(Netherlands) G Camara (Netherlands) R Chambet-Weil	11	11	11
(Nigeria) H Adeoye (Nigeria) S Adesanya	4	5	6
Q	(Nigeria) M Kazeem (Nigeria) K Oladele	6	5	7
3	(France) L Bardet (France) T Poret	11	11	11
Q	(Nigeria) Q Atunwon (Nigeria) T Adebakin	9	9	11	6
WC	(Romania) I Chirita (Romania) A Istrate	11	11	8	11
(Nigeria) O Omotayo (Denmark) A Lind	5	11	8	9
2	(India) A Bhattacharjee (India) P Jain	11	8	11	11

Quarter-finals
(Netherlands) G Camara (Netherlands) R Chambet-Weil	7	1	7
3	(France) L Bardet (France) T Poret	11	11	11
WC	(Romania) I Chirita (Romania) A Istrate	11	11	7	11
2	(India) A Bhattacharjee (India) P Jain	6	7	11	9

Semi-finals
3	(France) L Bardet (France) T Poret	8	5	5
WC	(Romania) I Chirita (Romania) A Istrate	11	11	11

== Women's doubles ==
=== Seeds ===
1. (Japan) Hitomi Sato / (Japan) Saki Shibata (final)
2. (India) Yashaswini Ghorpade / (India) Diya Chitale (semi-finals)
3. (India) Ayhika Mukherjee / (India) Sutirtha Mukherjee (semi-finals)
4. (Japan) Reina Aso / (South Korea) Joo Cheon-hui (champions)

=== Finals ===
Semi-finals
1	(Japan) Hitomi Sato (Japan) Saki Shibata	11	11	11
3	(India) Ayhika Mukherjee (India) Sutirtha Mukherjee	7	5	3
4	(Japan) Reina Aso (South Korea) Joo Cheon-hui	7	7	11	11	11
2	(India) Yashaswini Ghorpade (India) Diya Chitale	11	11	6	6	9

Final
1	(Japan) Hitomi Sato (Japan) Saki Shibata	11	8	7	4
4	(Japan) Reina Aso (South Korea) Joo Cheon-hui	1	11	11	11

=== Top half ===
First round
1	(Japan) H Sato (Japan) S Shibata	11	11	11
(Slovenia) A Tofant (Chile) P Vega	4	2	9
(Italy) D Vivarelli (Italy) G Monfardini	11	11	11
Q	(Nigeria) J Emmanuel (Nigeria) O Mbah	5	5	6
3	(India) A Mukherjee (India) S Mukherjee	11	11	11
WC	(Nigeria) K Okanlawon (Nigeria) H Hussain	2	9	5
(Nigeria) K Ayoola (Nigeria) A Rabiu	8	7	11	13	9
WC	(Nigeria) F Ojo (Nigeria) H Udoaka	11	11	9	11	11

Quarter-finals
1	(Japan) H Sato (Japan) S Shibata	11	11	11
(Italy) D Vivarelli (Italy) G Monfardini	7	2	2
3	(India) A Mukherjee (India) S Mukherjee	11	11	11
WC	(Nigeria) F Ojo (Nigeria) H Udoaka	7	5	4

Semi-finals
1	(Japan) H Sato (Japan) S Shibata	11	11	11
3	(India) A Mukherjee (India) S Mukherjee	7	5	3

=== Bottom half ===
First round
(India) M Batra (India) S Das	11	14	11
Q	(India) S Saini (India) N Mani	5	12	6
Q	(Nigeria) A Asaju (Nigeria) A Fashola	5	9	7
4	(Japan) R Aso (South Korea) Joo C-h	11	11	11
Q	(Nigeria) D Faleye (Nigeria) E Shaibu	6	4	1
(Nigeria) F Bello (Nigeria) A Ojomu	11	11	11
(Nigeria) A Odusanya (Nigeria) A Akinsete	5	4	7
2	(India) Y Ghorpade (India) D Chitale	11	11	11

Quarter-finals
(India) M Batra (India) S Das	9	6	11	11	3
4	(Japan) R Aso (South Korea) Joo C-h	11	11	9	5	11
(Nigeria) F Bello (Nigeria) A Ojomu	9	7	6
2	(India) Y Ghorpade (India) D Chitale	11	11	11

Semi-finals
4	(Japan) R Aso (South Korea) Joo C-h	7	7	11	11	11
2	(India) Y Ghorpade (India) D Chitale	11	11	6	6	9

== Mixed doubles ==
=== Seeds ===
1. (India) Manush Shah / (India) Diya Chitale (champions)
2. (India) Harmeet Desai / (India) Yashaswini Ghorpade (quarter-finals)
3. (Canada) Edward Ly / (Canada) Mo Zhang (semi-finals)
4. (Netherlands) Remi Chambet-Weil / (Chile) Paulina Vega (semi-finals)

=== Finals ===
Semi-finals
1	(India) Manush Shah (India) Diya Chitale	11	11	12
3	(Canada) Edward Ly (Canada) Mo Zhang	6	8	10
4	(Netherlands) Remi Chambet-Weil (Chile) Paulina Vega	12	10	3	5
(France) Leo De Nodrest (France) Camille Lutz	10	12	11	11

Final
1	(India) Manush Shah (India) Diya Chitale	11	14	11
(France) Leo De Nodrest (France) Camille Lutz	8	12	8

=== Top half ===
First round
1	(India) M Shah (India) D Chitale	11	11	11
WC	(Nigeria) O Omotayo (Italy) D Vivarelli	4	9	4
Q	(Nigeria) M Adegoke (Nigeria) A Rabiu	4	7	11	3
(Japan) K Yoshimura (Japan) R Aso	11	11	6	11
3	(Canada) E Ly (Canada) M Zhang	11	11	11
Q	(Nigeria) S Adesanya (Nigeria) C Okafor	4	5	7
Q	(India) M Thakkar (India) M Batra	11	11	11
(Nigeria) T Mati (Nigeria) F Ojo	1	6	7

Quarter-finals
1	(India) M Shah (India) D Chitale	11	7	11	11
(Japan) K Yoshimura (Japan) R Aso	8	11	9	8
3	(Canada) E Ly (Canada) M Zhang	10	11	8	11	11
Q	(India) M Thakkar (India) M Batra	12	8	11	3	7

Semi-finals
1	(India) M Shah (India) D Chitale	11	11	12
3	(Canada) E Ly (Canada) M Zhang	6	8	10

=== Bottom half ===
First round
Q	(Nigeria) A Abdulfatai (Nigeria) S Aiyelabegan	11	11	11
(Ghana) J Marfo (Ghana) C Kwabi	8	8	9
WC	(India) M Dani (India) A Mukherjee	7	12	9	7
4	(Netherlands) R Chambet-Weil (Chile) P Vega	11	10	11	11
(France) L de Nodrest (France) C Lutz	11	11	11
(Ghana) F Antwi (Ghana) J Borteye	4	7	0
(Nigeria) M Kuti (Nigeria) K Ayoola	5	3	10
2	(India) H Desai (India) Y Ghorpade	11	11	12

Quarter-finals
Q	(Nigeria) A Abdulfatai (Nigeria) S Aiyelabegan	11	7	8	8
4	(Netherlands) R Chambet-Weil (Chile) P Vega	8	11	11	11
(France) L de Nodrest (France) C Lutz	11	15	12
2	(India) H Desai (India) Y Ghorpade	6	13	10

Semi-finals
4	(Netherlands) R Chambet-Weil (Chile) P Vega	12	10	3	5
(France) L de Nodrest (France) C Lutz	10	12	11	11

Preceded by WTT Contender Taiyuan 2026	2026 WTT Series	Succeeded by WTT Contender Skopje 2026
