= Camille Lutz =

French table tennis player

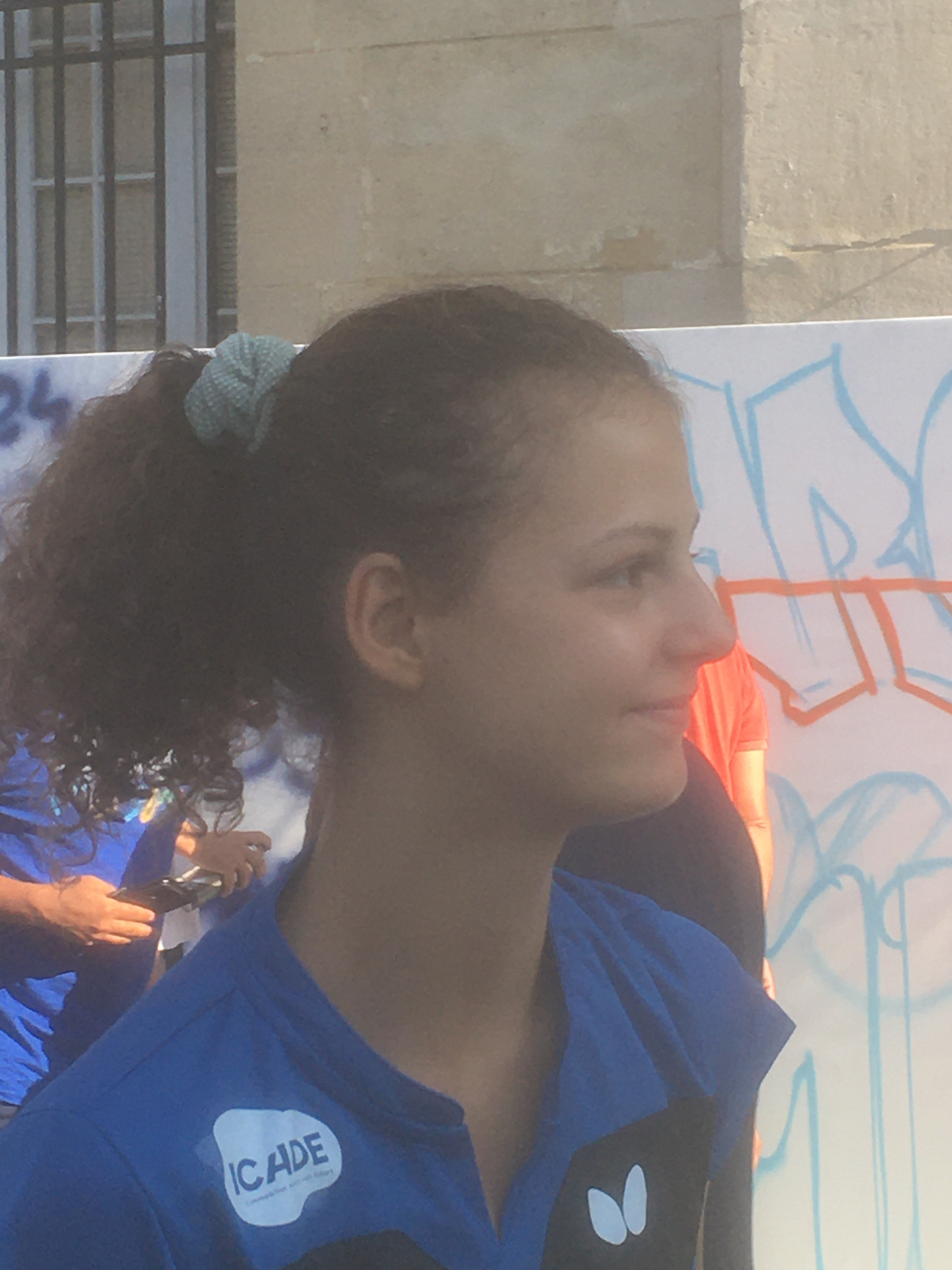

Personal information
- Born: 17 July 2002 (age 24) Hochfelden, France

Sport
- Sport: Table tennis
- Playing style: Right-handed shakehand
- Highest ranking: 73 (17 October 2023)
- Current ranking: 183 (6 June 2025)
Medal record
Women's table tennis
Representing France
World Championships
Bronze medal – third place	2024 Busan	Team
World University Games
Bronze medal – third place	2025 Rhine-Ruhr	Doubles

Camille Lutz (born 17 July 2002) is a French table tennis player. She is older sister of Charlotte Lutz.

== Biography ==
At the age of 6, she started playing table tennis in Hochfelden under encouragement of her mother who played regionally. Her first trainer Jérôme Richert also accompanied her with Can Akkuzu.

She won two gold medals at French table tennis championship in women's singles and mixed doubles events respectively.

In February 2024, was a bronze medalist at the 2024 World Team Table Tennis Championships. France's team was defeated in the semi-final by China. It has been 33 years since the French women's team has won a medal at the World Team Championships (the last also being a bronze medal in 1991).

== Finals ==
=== Mixed doubles ===
Result	Year	Tournament	Partner	Opponent	Score	Ref
Runner up	2026	WTT Contender Lagos	(France) Leo De Nodrest	(India) Manush Shah / Diya Chitale	0–3	
