= Taiyuan Riverside Sports Centre Gymnasium =

Indoor facility in Taiyuan, Shanxi, China

- 太原市滨河体育中心体育馆
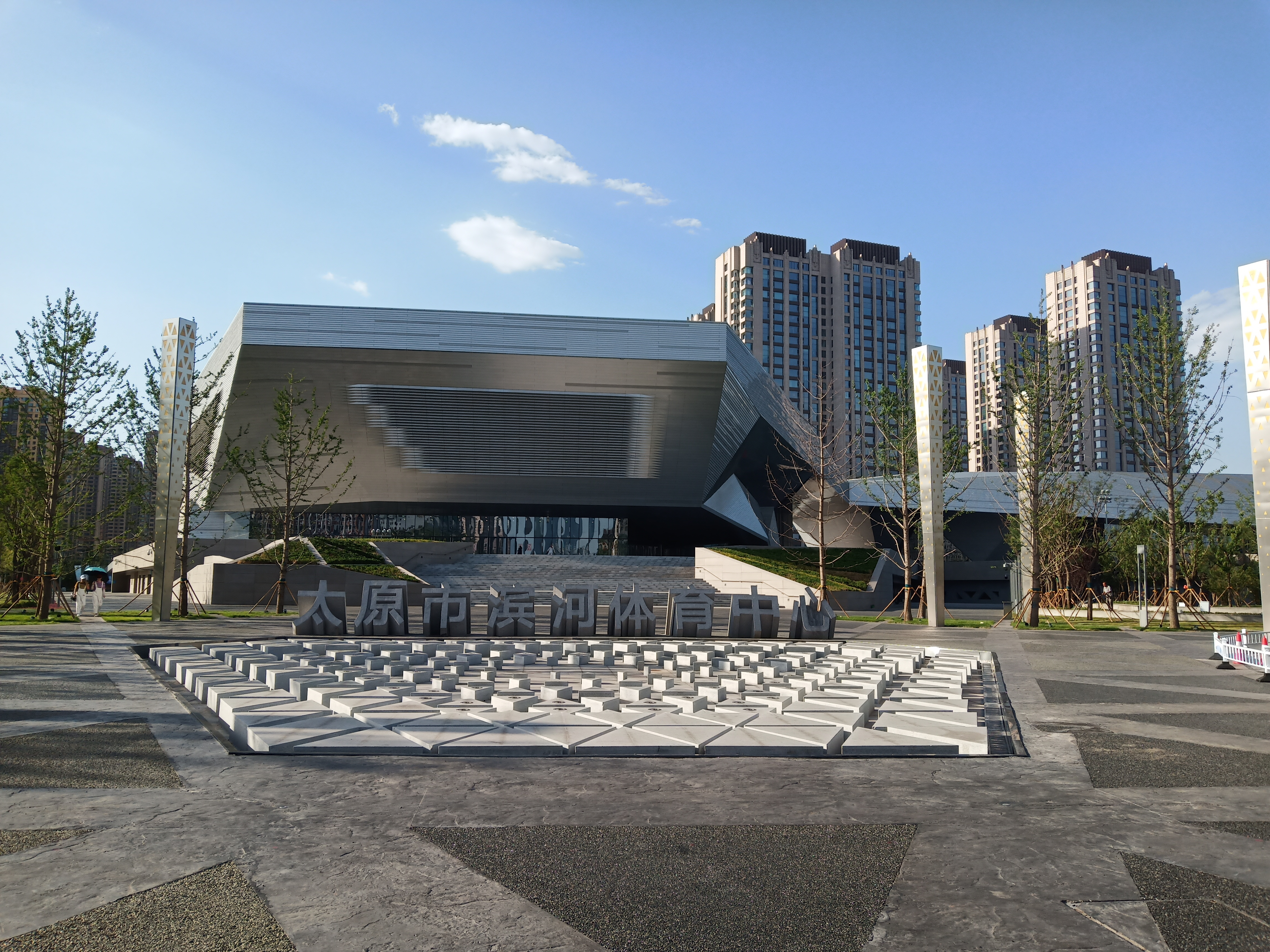
- Interactive map of Taiyuan Riverside Sports Centre Gymnasium
- Full name: Taiyuan Riverside Sports Centre Gymnasium
- Location: 1 Yifen Jie (漪汾街), Wanbailin District, Taiyuan, Shanxi, China
- Coordinates: 37°52′31″N 112°31′55″E
- Capacity: 5,331

Construction
- Opened: 1998

Tenant
- Shanxi Loongs (CBA)

Taiyuan Riverside Sports Centre Gymnasium (simplified Chinese: 太原市滨河体育中心体育馆; traditional Chinese: 太原市濱河體育中心體育館; pinyin: Tàiyuán Shì Bīnhé Tǐyù Zhōngxīn Tǐyùguǎn) is an indoor sporting arena located along the Fen River in Taiyuan, Shanxi, China. The capacity of the arena is 5,331 spectators and opened in 1998. It hosts indoor sporting events such as basketball and volleyball. It hosts the Shanxi Loongs of the Chinese Basketball Association (CBA).
