= Satsuki Odo =

Japanese table tennis player

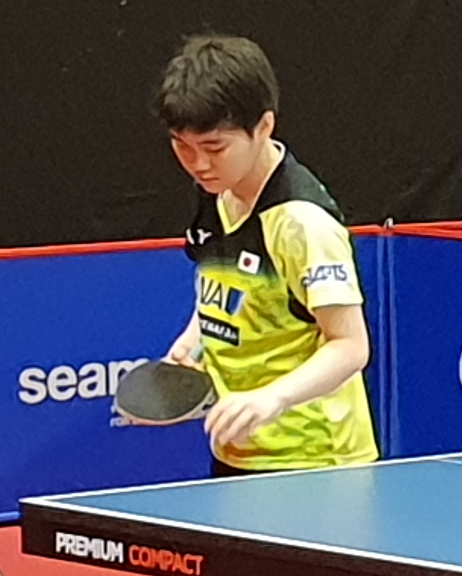
- Odo at the 2018 Swedish Open

Personal information
- Native name: 大藤沙月
- Born: 16 May 2004 (age 22) Ōno, Fukui, Japan
- Height: 152 cm (5 ft 0 in)

Sport
- Sport: Table tennis
- Club: Nippon Paint Mallets (T.League)
- Playing style: Right-handed shakehand grip
- Highest ranking: 7 (31 December 2024)
- Current ranking: 12 (28 September 2026)
Medal record
Women's table tennis
Representing Japan
World Championships
Silver medal – second place	2025 Doha	Mixed doubles
World Cup
Silver medal – second place	2025 Chengdu	Mixed team
Asian Championships
Gold medal – first place	2024 Astana	Doubles
Gold medal – first place	2024 Astana	Team
Gold medal – first place	2026 Tashkent	Team
Silver medal – second place	2025 Bhubaneswar	Team
Bronze medal – third place	2026 Tashkent	Doubles

Satsuki Odo (大藤 沙月, Ōdō Satsuki; born 16 May 2004) is a Japanese table tennis player.

== Career ==
Odo began playing table tennis at the age of three at a local club. After winning a silver medal at the national championships in second grade, she set her sights on the Olympics. From 2020 to 2021, Odo won the junior singles titles consecutively at the All Japan Table Tennis Championships.

In 2024, Odo transformed her playing style. She captured her first WTT singles title at the WTT Feeder Varaždin. After claiming multiple singles titles, she was selected for the Japanese national team at the 2024 Asian Championships, where she won gold medals in both the women's doubles and the women's team events. Following a notable victory over Miwa Harimoto at the WTT Champions Montpellier, Odo broke into the top ten of the women's singles world rankings in November 2024.

Odo won her first medal at the World Championships in 2025, partnering with Maharu Yoshimura in the mixed doubles. The duo achieved a historic upset by defeating the No. 1 seeds, Lin Shidong and Kuai Man, ultimately securing a silver medal. In June 2025, Odo defeated China's Shi Xunyao, claiming the women's singles title at the WTT Contender Zagreb.

== Finals ==
=== Women's singles ===
Result	Year	Tournament	Opponent	Score	Ref
Winner	2024	WTT Feeder Varazdin	(South Korea) Lee Eun-hye	3–1	
Winner	2024	WTT Feeder Düsseldorf	(Hong Kong) Zhu Chengzhu	3–1	
Winner	2024	WTT Feeder Cappadocia	(Japan) Hitomi Sato	3–0	
Runner-up	2024	WTT Contender Tunis	(Japan) Miwa Harimoto	0–4	
Winner	2024	WTT Contender Lima	(Chinese Taipei) Huang Yi-hua	4–0	
Winner	2024	WTT Feeder Panagyurishte	(Japan) Honoka Hashimoto	3–1	
Winner	2024	WTT Champions Montpellier	(Japan) Miwa Harimoto	4–2	
Winner	2025	WTT Contender Zagreb	(China) Shi Xunyao	4–2	
Winner	2026	WTT Star Contender Chennai	(Japan) Miu Hirano	4–0	
Winner	2026	WTT Contender Taiyuan	(Japan) Hitomi Sato	4–1	
Winner	2026	WTT Contender Lagos	(Japan) Honoka Hashimoto	4–1	
Winner	2026	WTT Contender Skopje	(Japan) Honoka Hashimoto	4–0	
Runner-up	2026	WTT Champions Frankfurt	(Japan) Hina Hayata	2–4	

=== Women's doubles ===
Result	Year	Tournament	Partner	Opponent	Score	Ref
Runner-up	2018	ITTF Challenge, Thailand Open	Saki Shibata	(Thailand) Orawan Paranang / Suthasini Sawettabut	2–3	
Winner	2018	ITTF Challenge, Belgium Open	Saki Shibata	(Luxembourg) Sarah De Nutte / Ni Xialian	3–0	
Winner	2018	ITTF Challenge, Belarus Open	Saki Shibata	(Slovakia) Barbora Balážová / (Czech Republic) Hana Matelová	3–0	
Winner	2019	ITTF Challenge Plus, Oman Open	Saki Shibata	(Japan) Honoka Hashimoto / Hitomi Sato	3–1	
Runner-up	2019	ITTF Challenge, Slovenia Open	Saki Shibata	(Japan) Miyu Nagasaki / Miyuu Kihara	0–3	
Winner	2019	ITTF Challenge, Thailand Open	Saki Shibata	(Japan) Ayane Morita / Yuka Umemura	3–0	
Winner	2019	ITTF Challenge, Belarus Open	Saki Shibata	(Poland) Anna Węgrzyn / Katarzyna Węgrzyn	3–1	
Winner	2020	ITTF Challenge, Spanish Open	Saki Shibata	(Japan) Honoka Hashimoto / Maki Shiomi	3–0	
Winner	2020	ITTF Challenge Plus, Portugal Open	Saki Shibata	(Thailand) Orawan Paranang / Suthasini Sawettabut	3–0	
Winner	2024	WTT Feeder Varazdin	Sakura Yokoi	(Hong Kong) Zhu Chengzhu / Lee Ho Ching	3–1	
Winner	2024	WTT Contender Zagreb	Sakura Yokoi	(South Korea) Joo Cheon-hui / Jeon Ji-hee	3–1	
Winner	2024	WTT Contender Tunis	Sakura Yokoi	(India) Diya Parag Chitale / Yashaswini Ghorpade	3–0	
Winner	2024	WTT Contender Lima	Sakura Yokoi	(Chinese Taipei) Wang Yi-ju / Huang Yi-hua	3–0	
Runner-up	2024	WTT Contender Almaty	Sakura Yokoi	(China) He Zhuojia / Liu Weishan	2–3	
Runner-up	2024	WTT Feeder Panagyurishte	Sakura Yokoi	(Japan) Honoka Hashimoto / Hitomi Sato	0–3	
Winner	2024	Asian Championships	Sakura Yokoi	(Japan) Miwa Harimoto / Miyuu Kihara	3–2	
Runner-up	2024	WTT Finals	Sakura Yokoi	(Japan) Honoka Hashimoto / Hitomi Sato	0–3	
Winner	2025	WTT Star Contender Doha	Sakura Yokoi	(China) He Zhuojia / Zong Geman	3–0	
Winner	2025	WTT Contender Muscat	Sakura Yokoi	(Hong Kong) Zhu Chengzhu / Ng Wing Lam	3–1	
Runner-up	2025	WTT Contender Tunis	Sakura Yokoi	(Japan) Miwa Harimoto / Miyuu Kihara	1–3	
Runner-up	2025	WTT Contender Skopje	Sakura Yokoi	(South Korea) Kim Na-yeong / Ryu Han-na	1–3	
Winner	2025	WTT Star Contender Ljubljana	Miwa Harimoto	(South Korea) Choi Hyo-joo / Shin Yu-bin	3–1	
Winner	2025	WTT Contender Zagreb	Miwa Harimoto	(Japan) Sakura Yokoi / Hitomi Sato	3–2	
Winner	2025	WTT Contender Buenos Aires	Miwa Harimoto	(Japan) Sakura Yokoi / Hitomi Sato	3–2	
Winner	2025	WTT Star Contender Foz do Iguaçu	Miwa Harimoto	(South Korea) Kim Na-yeong / Ryu Han-na	3–0	
Runner-up	2025	WTT Europe Smash-Sweden 2025	Miwa Harimoto	(China) Sun Yingsha / Wang Manyu	2–3	
Winner	2025	WTT Star Contender Muscat	Sakura Yokoi	(South Korea) Joo Cheon-hui / Kim Na-yeong	3–2	
Winner	2026	WTT Star Contender Doha	Sakura Yokoi	(Japan) Hitomi Sato / Saki Shibata	3–0	
Winner	2026	WTT Contender Skopje	Sakura Yokoi	(Japan) Cocona Muramatsu / Sachi Aoki	3–0	
Winner	2026	WTT Contender Zagreb	Miwa Harimoto	(South Korea) Lee Eun-hye / Choi Hyo-joo	3–0	
Runner-up	2026	WTT Star Contender Ljubljana	Sakura Yokoi	(Japan) Miwa Harimoto / Hina Hayata	0–3	

=== Mixed doubles ===
Result	Year	Tournament	Partner	Opponent	Score	Ref
Runner-up	2025	WTT Star Contender Chennai	Maharu Yoshimura	(South Korea) Lim Jong-hoon / Shin Yu-bin	0–3	
Runner-up	2025	World Championships	Maharu Yoshimura	(China) Wang Chuqin / Sun Yingsha	1–3	
Runner-up	2026	WTT Contender Zagreb	Shunsuke Togami	(Hong Kong) Wong Chun Ting / Doo Hoi Kem	2–3	
Winner	2026	WTT Star Contender São José dos Campos	Shunsuke Togami	(Brazil) Hugo Calderano / Bruna Takahashi	3–1	
