= Saki Shibata =

Japanese table tennis player

Personal information
- Born: 25 August 1997 (age 28) Asahi, Chiba, Japan
- Height: 155 cm (5 ft 1 in)

Sport
- Sport: Table tennis
- Playing style: Right-handed shakehand grip
- Highest ranking: 13 (June 2019)
- Current ranking: 53 (25 May 2026)
Medal record
Women's table tennis
Representing Japan
Asian Championships
Gold medal – first place	2021 Doha	Team
Silver medal – second place	2019 Yogyakarta	Team
Bronze medal – third place	2019 Yogyakarta	Doubles
Bronze medal – third place	2021 Doha	Singles

Saki Shibata (芝田 沙季, Shibata Saki; born 25 August 1997) is a Japanese table tennis player.

During the 2018 ITTF Challenge Series season she won unprecedented ten titles, including four senior singles titles.

== Finals ==
=== Women's singles ===
Result	Year	Tournament	Opponent	Score	Ref.
Winner	2016	ITTF World Tour, Belarus Open	(Belarus) Viktoria Pavlovich	4–2	
Runner-up	2017	ITTF Challenge, Polish Open	(Japan) Mima Ito	1–4	
Winner	2017	ITTF Challenge, Belgium Open	(Russia) Polina Mikhailova	4–1	
Winner	2018	ITTF Challenge, Spanish Open	(Japan) Hitomi Sato	4–2	
Winner	2018	ITTF Challenge, Croatia Open	(Romania) Elizabeta Samara	4–2	
Winner	2018	ITTF Challenge, Belgium Open	(Japan) Honoka Hashimoto	4–0	
Winner	2018	ITTF Challenge, Belarus Open	(Russia) Polina Mikhailova	4–0	
Runner-up	2019	ITTF Challenge, Thailand Open	(Japan) Hitomi Sato	3–4	
Runner-up	2020	ITTF Challenge, Portugal Open	(Japan) Kasumi Ishikawa	0–4	
Winner	2025	WTT Feeder Spokane	(Japan) Kaho Akae	3–1	
Runner-up	2025	WTT Feeder Spokane II	(Japan) Kaho Akae	1–3	

=== Women's doubles ===
Result	Year	Tournament	Partner	Opponents	Score	Ref.
Winner	2018	ITTF Challenge, Belgium Open	Satsuki Odo	(Luxembourg) Sarah De Nutte / Ni Xialian	3–0	
Runner-up	2018	ITTF Challenge, Thailand Open	Satsuki Odo	(Thailand) Orawan Paranang / Suthasini Sawettabut	2–3	
Winner	2018	ITTF Challenge, Belarus Open	Satsuki Odo	(Slovakia) Barbora Balážová / (Czech Republic) Hana Matelová	3–0	
Winner	2019	ITTF Challenge, Oman Open	Satsuki Odo	(Japan) Honoka Hashimoto / Hitomi Sato	3–1	
Runner-up	2019	ITTF Challenge, Slovenia Open	Satsuki Odo	(Japan) Miyu Nagasaki / Miyuu Kihara	0–3	
Winner	2019	ITTF Challenge, Thailand Open	Satsuki Odo	(Japan) Ayane Morita / Yuka Umemura	3–0	
Runner-up	2019	ITTF World Tour, Bulgaria Open	Miu Hirano	(China) Gu Yuting / Mu Zi	0–3	
Runner-up	2019	ITTF World Tour, Czech Open	Miu Hirano	(China) Gu Yuting / Mu Zi	1–3	
Winner	2019	ITTF Challenge, Belarus Open	Satsuki Odo	(Poland) Anna Węgrzyn / Katarzyna Węgrzyn	3–1	
Winner	2020	ITTF Challenge, Spanish Open	Satsuki Odo	(Japan) Honoka Hashimoto / Maki Shiomi	3–0	
Winner	2020	ITTF Challenge, Portugal Open	Satsuki Odo	(Thailand) Orawan Paranang / Suthasini Sawettabut	3–0	
Runner-up	2025	WTT Feeder Spokane	Hitomi Sato	(Japan) Asuka Sasao / Anne Uesawa	2–3	
Winner	2025	WTT Feeder Spokane II	Hitomi Sato	(Japan) Asuka Sasao / Anne Uesawa	3–1	
Winner	2025	WTT Feeder Cappadocia II	Hitomi Sato	(Singapore) Ser Lin Qian / Loy Ming Ying	3–0	
Runner-up	2026	WTT Contender Lagos	Hitomi Sato	(Japan) Reina Aso / (South Korea) Joo Cheon-hui	1–3	
