= World Table Tennis =

The World Table Tennis may refer to:

- World Table Tennis (ITTF)
- World Table Tennis (magazine)
