= 2025 WTT Series =

Table tennis tournament

2025 World Table Tennis Series
Tournament details
- Dates: 6 January 2025 –
- Edition: 5th

The 2025 WTT series was the 5th season of the World Table Tennis's professional table tennis world tour. The 2025 series is the first in which the United States has participated.

== Key ==
WTT Grand Smash
WTT Cup Finals
WTT Champions
WTT Star Contender
WTT Contender

== Winners ==
Tour	Report	Men's singles	Women's singles	Men's doubles	Women's doubles	Mixed doubles
Grand Smash
Singapore Smash (Singapore Sports Hub, 30 Jan - 9 Feb)		(China) Lin Shidong	(China) Sun Yingsha	(China) Wang Chuqin (China) Lin Shidong	(China) Wang Manyu (China) Kuai Man	(China) Lin Shidong (China) Kuai Man
United States Smash (Orleans Arena, Las Vegas, 3 Jul - 13 Jul)		(China) Wang Chuqin	(China) Zhu Yuling	(South Korea) An Jaehyun (South Korea) Lim Jonghoon	(China) Wang Yidi (China) Kuai Man	(China) Lin Shidong (China) Kuai Man
Europe Smash (Malmö Arena, Sweden, Aug 14 -24 Aug)	Report	(Sweden) Truls Moregard	(China) Sun Yingsha	(Hong Kong) Wong Chun Ting (Hong Kong) Chan Baldwin	(China) Sun Yingsha (China) Wang Manyu	(China) Lin Shidong (China) Kuai Man
China Smash	Report	(China) Wang Chuqin	(China) Wang Manyu	(China) Lin Shidong (China) Wang Chuqin	(China) Wang Manyu (China) Kuai Man	(China) Wang Chuqin (China) Sun Yingsha
WTT Finals
Finals	Report	(Japan) Tomokazu Harimoto	(China) Wang Manyu			(South Korea) Lim Jong-hoon (South Korea) Shin Yu-bin
WTT Champions
Champions Chongqing	Report	(China) Wang Chuqin	(China) Sun Yingsha			
Champions Incheon	Report	(China) Xiang Peng	(China) Wang Yidi			
Champions Yokohama	Report	(Japan) Tomokazu Harimoto	(China) Chen Xingtong			
Champions Macao	Report	(China) Wang Chuqin	(China) Sun Yingsha			
Champions Montpellier	Report	(Sweden) Truls Möregårdh	(China) Wang Yidi			
Champions Frankfurt	Report	(Japan) Sora Matsushima	(Japan) Hina Hayata			
WTT Star Contender
Star Contender Doha	Report	(Japan) Tomokazu Harimoto	(China) Kuai Man	(China) Xiang Peng (China) Xu Yingbin	(Japan) Satsuki Odo (Japan) Sakura Yokoi	(Japan) Sora Matsushima (Japan) Miwa Harimoto
Star Contender Chennai	Report	(South Korea) Oh Junsung	(Japan) Miwa Harimoto	(South Korea) Lim Jong-hoon (South Korea) An Jae-hyun	(Japan) Miwa Harimoto (Japan) Miyuu Kihara	(South Korea) Lim Jong-hoon (South Korea) Shin Yu-bin
Star Contender Ljubljana	Report	(Brazil) Hugo Calderano	(Japan) Miyu Nagasaki	(South Korea) An Jaehyun (South Korea) Lim Jonghoon	(Japan) Miwa Harimoto (Japan) Satsuki Odo	(South Korea) Lim Jonghoon (South Korea) Shin Yubin
Star Contender Foz do Iguaçu	Report	(Brazil) Hugo Calderano	(Japan) Miwa Harimoto	(Germany) Benedikt Duda (Germany) Dang Qiu	(Japan) Miwa Harimoto (Japan) Satsuki Odo	(Japan) Satoshi Aida (Japan) Honoka Hashimoto
Star Contender London	Report	(Germany) Dang Qiu	(Japan) Miwa Harimoto	(Chinese Taipei) Kuo Guan-Hong (Chinese Taipei) Feng Yi-Hsin	(China) Shi Xunyao (China) Zhang Xianyu	(Chinese Taipei) Lin Yun-Ju (Chinese Taipei) Cheng I-Ching
Star Contender Muscat	Report	(France) Felix Lebrun	(Japan) Miyuu Kihara	(South Korea) Lim Jonghoon (South Korea) Oh Junsung	(Japan) Satsuki Odo (Japan) Sakura Yokoi	(Japan) Satoshi Aida (Japan) Hitomi Sato
WTT Contender
Contender Muscat	Report	(China) Chen Yuanyu	(China) Shi Xunyao	(Japan) Tomokazu Harimoto (Japan) Sora Matsushima	(Japan) Satsuki Odo (Japan) Sakura Yokoi	(Spain) Alvaro Robles (Spain) Maria Xiao
Contender Taiyuan	Report	(Japan) Sora Matsushima	(Japan) Honoka Hashimoto	(China) Xu Yingbin (China) Xiang Peng	(South Korea) Kim Nayeong (South Korea) Ryu Hanna	(South Korea) Lim Jong-hoon (South Korea) Kim Nayeong
Contender Tunis	Report	(France) Felix Lebrun	(Japan) Miwa Harimoto	(Germany) Benedikt Duda (Germany) Andre Bertelsmeier	(Japan) Miwa Harimoto (Japan) Miyuu Kihara	(India) Manush Shah (India) Diya Chitale
Contender Skopje	Report	(Germany) Benedikt Duda	(France) Jia Nan Yuan	(South Korea) Lim Jonghoon (South Korea) Oh Junsung	(South Korea) Kim Naeyong (South Korea) Ryu Hanna	(Sweden) Kristian Karlsson (Sweden) Christina Kallberg
Contender Zagreb	Report	(Japan) Tomokazu Harimoto	(Japan) Satsuki Odo	(Hong Kong) Wong Chun Ting (Hong Kong) Chan Baldwin	(Japan) Miwa Harimoto (Japan) Satsuki Odo	(South Korea) Lim Jonghoon (South Korea) Shin Yubin
Contender Lagos	Report	(Denmark) Anders Lind	(Japan) Honoka Hashimoto	(India) Sathiyan Gnanasekaran (India) Akash Pal	(South Korea) Kim Nayeong (South Korea) Ryu Hanna	(France) Jules Rolland (France) Prithika Pavade
Contender Buenos Aires	Report	(Brazil) Hugo Calderano	(Japan) Miwa Harimoto	(Japan) Kazuki Hamada (Japan) Hiromu Kobayashi	(Japan) Miwa Harimoto (Japan) Satsuki Odo	(Brazil) Hugo Calderano (Brazil) Bruna Takahashi
Contender Almaty	Report	(Japan) Shunsuke Togami	(Japan) Honoka Hashimoto	(China) Yuan Licen (China) Xu Yingbin	(Japan) Honoka Hashimoto (Japan) Hitomi Sato	(China) Huang Youzheng (China) Shi Xunyao

== Finals ==
This is the complete schedule of events on the 2025 calendar, with the champions and runners-up documented.

January
Date	Tournament	Champions	Runners-up
6–11 January	WTT Star Contender Doha: Location: Doha, Qatar; Venue: Lusail Sports Arena; Category: Star Contender; Prize: $275,000; Draws: 48MS/48WS/16MD/16WD/16XD	(Japan) Tomokazu Harimoto	(Denmark) Jonathan Groth
6–11 January	WTT Star Contender Doha: Location: Doha, Qatar; Venue: Lusail Sports Arena; Category: Star Contender; Prize: $275,000; Draws: 48MS/48WS/16MD/16WD/16XD	Score: 4–0 (11–9, 13–11, 11–9, 11–6)	
6–11 January	WTT Star Contender Doha: Location: Doha, Qatar; Venue: Lusail Sports Arena; Category: Star Contender; Prize: $275,000; Draws: 48MS/48WS/16MD/16WD/16XD	(China) Kuai Man	(Japan) Miyuu Kihara
6–11 January	WTT Star Contender Doha: Location: Doha, Qatar; Venue: Lusail Sports Arena; Category: Star Contender; Prize: $275,000; Draws: 48MS/48WS/16MD/16WD/16XD	Score: 4–0 (11–6, 11–3, 11–8, 11–3)	
6–11 January	WTT Star Contender Doha: Location: Doha, Qatar; Venue: Lusail Sports Arena; Category: Star Contender; Prize: $275,000; Draws: 48MS/48WS/16MD/16WD/16XD	(China) Xiang Peng (China) Xu Yingbin	(Japan) Sora Matsushima (Japan) Tomokazu Harimoto
6–11 January	WTT Star Contender Doha: Location: Doha, Qatar; Venue: Lusail Sports Arena; Category: Star Contender; Prize: $275,000; Draws: 48MS/48WS/16MD/16WD/16XD	Score: 3–2 (15–13, 4–11, 11–8, 11–13, 11–6)	
6–11 January	WTT Star Contender Doha: Location: Doha, Qatar; Venue: Lusail Sports Arena; Category: Star Contender; Prize: $275,000; Draws: 48MS/48WS/16MD/16WD/16XD	(Japan) Sakura Yokoi (Japan) Satsuki Odo	(China) He Zhuojia (China) Zong Geman
6–11 January	WTT Star Contender Doha: Location: Doha, Qatar; Venue: Lusail Sports Arena; Category: Star Contender; Prize: $275,000; Draws: 48MS/48WS/16MD/16WD/16XD	Score: 3–0 (11–2, 12–10, 11–9)	
6–11 January	WTT Star Contender Doha: Location: Doha, Qatar; Venue: Lusail Sports Arena; Category: Star Contender; Prize: $275,000; Draws: 48MS/48WS/16MD/16WD/16XD	(Japan) Sora Matsushima (Japan) Miwa Harimoto	(China) Huang Youzheng (China) Shi Xunyao
6–11 January	WTT Star Contender Doha: Location: Doha, Qatar; Venue: Lusail Sports Arena; Category: Star Contender; Prize: $275,000; Draws: 48MS/48WS/16MD/16WD/16XD	Score: 3–2 (6–11, 11–8, 9–11, 11–7, 11–7)	
11–17 January	WTT Contender Muscat: Location: Muscat, Oman; Venue: Sultan Qaboos Sport Complex; Category: Contender; Prize: $85,000; Draws: 32MS/32WS/16MD/16WD/16XD	(China) Chen Yuanyu	(Japan) Tomokazu Harimoto
11–17 January	WTT Contender Muscat: Location: Muscat, Oman; Venue: Sultan Qaboos Sport Complex; Category: Contender; Prize: $85,000; Draws: 32MS/32WS/16MD/16WD/16XD	Score: 4–2 (8–11, 11–7, 11–7, 3–11, 11–4, 12–10)	
11–17 January	WTT Contender Muscat: Location: Muscat, Oman; Venue: Sultan Qaboos Sport Complex; Category: Contender; Prize: $85,000; Draws: 32MS/32WS/16MD/16WD/16XD	(China) Shi Xunyao	(China) Kuai Man
11–17 January	WTT Contender Muscat: Location: Muscat, Oman; Venue: Sultan Qaboos Sport Complex; Category: Contender; Prize: $85,000; Draws: 32MS/32WS/16MD/16WD/16XD	Score: 4–0 (11–6, 11–9, 11–8, 11–4)	
11–17 January	WTT Contender Muscat: Location: Muscat, Oman; Venue: Sultan Qaboos Sport Complex; Category: Contender; Prize: $85,000; Draws: 32MS/32WS/16MD/16WD/16XD	(Japan) Tomokazu Harimoto (Japan) Sora Matsushima	(Chinese Taipei) Hung Jing-kai (Chinese Taipei) Chang Yu-an
11–17 January	WTT Contender Muscat: Location: Muscat, Oman; Venue: Sultan Qaboos Sport Complex; Category: Contender; Prize: $85,000; Draws: 32MS/32WS/16MD/16WD/16XD	Score: 3–0 (15–13, 11–5, 11–6)	
11–17 January	WTT Contender Muscat: Location: Muscat, Oman; Venue: Sultan Qaboos Sport Complex; Category: Contender; Prize: $85,000; Draws: 32MS/32WS/16MD/16WD/16XD	(Japan) Sakura Yokoi (Japan) Satsuki Odo	(Hong Kong) Zhu Chengzhu (Hong Kong) Ng Wing Lam
11–17 January	WTT Contender Muscat: Location: Muscat, Oman; Venue: Sultan Qaboos Sport Complex; Category: Contender; Prize: $85,000; Draws: 32MS/32WS/16MD/16WD/16XD	Score: 3–1 (10–12, 11–4, 11–9, 11–4)	
11–17 January	WTT Contender Muscat: Location: Muscat, Oman; Venue: Sultan Qaboos Sport Complex; Category: Contender; Prize: $85,000; Draws: 32MS/32WS/16MD/16WD/16XD	(Spain) Alvaro Robles (Spain) Maria Xiao	(China) Huang Youzheng (China) Shi Xunyao
11–17 January	WTT Contender Muscat: Location: Muscat, Oman; Venue: Sultan Qaboos Sport Complex; Category: Contender; Prize: $85,000; Draws: 32MS/32WS/16MD/16WD/16XD	Score: 3–1 (11–6, 14–12, 10–12, 19–17)	
30 January – 9 February	Singapore Smash: Location: Singapore; Venue: Singapore Sports Hub; Category: Grand Smash; Prize: $1,500,000; Draws: 64MS/64WS/24MD/24WD/24XD	(China) Lin Shidong	(China) Liang Jingkun
30 January – 9 February	Singapore Smash: Location: Singapore; Venue: Singapore Sports Hub; Category: Grand Smash; Prize: $1,500,000; Draws: 64MS/64WS/24MD/24WD/24XD	Score: 4–2 (9–11, 11–8, 11–8, 6–11, 11–3, 11–2)	
30 January – 9 February	Singapore Smash: Location: Singapore; Venue: Singapore Sports Hub; Category: Grand Smash; Prize: $1,500,000; Draws: 64MS/64WS/24MD/24WD/24XD	(China) Sun Yingsha	(China) Kuai Man
30 January – 9 February	Singapore Smash: Location: Singapore; Venue: Singapore Sports Hub; Category: Grand Smash; Prize: $1,500,000; Draws: 64MS/64WS/24MD/24WD/24XD	Score: 4–1 (11–8, 9–11, 11–7, 11–5, 11–6)	
30 January – 9 February	Singapore Smash: Location: Singapore; Venue: Singapore Sports Hub; Category: Grand Smash; Prize: $1,500,000; Draws: 64MS/64WS/24MD/24WD/24XD	(China) Wang Chuqin (China) Lin Shidong	(Chinese Taipei) Kao Cheng-Jui (Chinese Taipei) Lin Yun-ju
30 January – 9 February	Singapore Smash: Location: Singapore; Venue: Singapore Sports Hub; Category: Grand Smash; Prize: $1,500,000; Draws: 64MS/64WS/24MD/24WD/24XD	Score: 3–0 (11–2, 11–4, 13–11)	
30 January – 9 February	Singapore Smash: Location: Singapore; Venue: Singapore Sports Hub; Category: Grand Smash; Prize: $1,500,000; Draws: 64MS/64WS/24MD/24WD/24XD	(China) Kuai Man (China) Wang Manyu	(China) Wang Yidi (China) Sun Yingsha
30 January – 9 February	Singapore Smash: Location: Singapore; Venue: Singapore Sports Hub; Category: Grand Smash; Prize: $1,500,000; Draws: 64MS/64WS/24MD/24WD/24XD	Score: 3–2 (9–11, 12–10, 10–12, 11–9, 11–8)	
30 January – 9 February	Singapore Smash: Location: Singapore; Venue: Singapore Sports Hub; Category: Grand Smash; Prize: $1,500,000; Draws: 64MS/64WS/24MD/24WD/24XD	(China) Lin Shidong (China) Kuai Man	(Japan) Sora Matsushima (Japan) Miwa Harimoto
30 January – 9 February	Singapore Smash: Location: Singapore; Venue: Singapore Sports Hub; Category: Grand Smash; Prize: $1,500,000; Draws: 64MS/64WS/24MD/24WD/24XD	Score: 3–1 (8–11, 11–5, 11–8, 11–9)	

March
Date	Tournament	Champions	Runners-up
11–16 March	WTT Champions Chongqing: Location: Chongqing, China; Venue: Huaxi LIVE-Yudong Sports and Culture Center; Category: Champions; Prize: $800,000; Draws: 32MS/32WS	(China) Wang Chuqin	(China) Lin Shidong
11–16 March	WTT Champions Chongqing: Location: Chongqing, China; Venue: Huaxi LIVE-Yudong Sports and Culture Center; Category: Champions; Prize: $800,000; Draws: 32MS/32WS	Score: 4–1 (11–5, 6–11, 11–7, 11–5, 11–6)	
11–16 March	WTT Champions Chongqing: Location: Chongqing, China; Venue: Huaxi LIVE-Yudong Sports and Culture Center; Category: Champions; Prize: $800,000; Draws: 32MS/32WS	(China) Sun Yingsha	(China) Chen Xingtong
11–16 March	WTT Champions Chongqing: Location: Chongqing, China; Venue: Huaxi LIVE-Yudong Sports and Culture Center; Category: Champions; Prize: $800,000; Draws: 32MS/32WS	Score: 4–0 (11–7, 11–4, 12–10, 11–7)	
25–30 March	WTT Star Contender Chennai: Location: Chennai, India; Venue: Jawaharlal Nehru Indoor Stadium; Category: Star Contender; Prize: $275,000; Draws: 48MS/48WS/16MD/16WD/16XD	(South Korea) Oh Junsung	(France) Thibault Poret
25–30 March	WTT Star Contender Chennai: Location: Chennai, India; Venue: Jawaharlal Nehru Indoor Stadium; Category: Star Contender; Prize: $275,000; Draws: 48MS/48WS/16MD/16WD/16XD	Score: 4–3 (9–11, 11–7, 11–3, 9–11, 6–11, 11–4, 11–7)	
25–30 March	WTT Star Contender Chennai: Location: Chennai, India; Venue: Jawaharlal Nehru Indoor Stadium; Category: Star Contender; Prize: $275,000; Draws: 48MS/48WS/16MD/16WD/16XD	(Japan) Miwa Harimoto	(Japan) Honoka Hashimoto
25–30 March	WTT Star Contender Chennai: Location: Chennai, India; Venue: Jawaharlal Nehru Indoor Stadium; Category: Star Contender; Prize: $275,000; Draws: 48MS/48WS/16MD/16WD/16XD	Score: 4–2 (9–11, 11–3, 11–8, 11–9, 10–12, 11–7)	
25–30 March	WTT Star Contender Chennai: Location: Chennai, India; Venue: Jawaharlal Nehru Indoor Stadium; Category: Star Contender; Prize: $275,000; Draws: 48MS/48WS/16MD/16WD/16XD	(South Korea) Lim Jong-hoon (South Korea) An Jae-hyun	(Japan) Sora Matsushima (Japan) Tomokazu Harimoto
25–30 March	WTT Star Contender Chennai: Location: Chennai, India; Venue: Jawaharlal Nehru Indoor Stadium; Category: Star Contender; Prize: $275,000; Draws: 48MS/48WS/16MD/16WD/16XD	Score: 3–1 (11–4, 11–13, 11–2, 11–3)	
25–30 March	WTT Star Contender Chennai: Location: Chennai, India; Venue: Jawaharlal Nehru Indoor Stadium; Category: Star Contender; Prize: $275,000; Draws: 48MS/48WS/16MD/16WD/16XD	(Japan) Miwa Harimoto (Japan) Miyuu Kihara	(South Korea) Shin Yu-bin (South Korea) Ryu Hanna
25–30 March	WTT Star Contender Chennai: Location: Chennai, India; Venue: Jawaharlal Nehru Indoor Stadium; Category: Star Contender; Prize: $275,000; Draws: 48MS/48WS/16MD/16WD/16XD	Score: 3–2 (9–11, 11–9, 13–11, 12–14, 11–5)	
25–30 March	WTT Star Contender Chennai: Location: Chennai, India; Venue: Jawaharlal Nehru Indoor Stadium; Category: Star Contender; Prize: $275,000; Draws: 48MS/48WS/16MD/16WD/16XD	(South Korea) Lim Jong-hoon (South Korea) Shin Yu-bin	(Japan) Maharu Yoshimura (Japan) Satsuki Odo
25–30 March	WTT Star Contender Chennai: Location: Chennai, India; Venue: Jawaharlal Nehru Indoor Stadium; Category: Star Contender; Prize: $275,000; Draws: 48MS/48WS/16MD/16WD/16XD	Score: 3–0 (11–8, 11–5, 11–4)	

April
Date	Tournament	Champions	Runners-up
1–6 April	WTT Champions Incheon: Location: Incheon, Korea Republic; Venue: Inspire Arena; Category: Champions; Prize: $500,000; Draws: 32MS/32WS	(China) Xiang Peng	(South Korea) Lee Sang-su
1–6 April	WTT Champions Incheon: Location: Incheon, Korea Republic; Venue: Inspire Arena; Category: Champions; Prize: $500,000; Draws: 32MS/32WS	Score: 4–0 (11–8, 11–0, 11–3, 11–4)	
1–6 April	WTT Champions Incheon: Location: Incheon, Korea Republic; Venue: Inspire Arena; Category: Champions; Prize: $500,000; Draws: 32MS/32WS	(China) Wang Yidi	(China) Chen Xingtong
1–6 April	WTT Champions Incheon: Location: Incheon, Korea Republic; Venue: Inspire Arena; Category: Champions; Prize: $500,000; Draws: 32MS/32WS	Score: 4–3 (11–9, 8–11, 9–11, 12–14, 11–9, 11–6, 12–10)	
8–13 April	WTT Contender Taiyuan: Location: Taiyuan, China; Venue: Taiyuan Binhe Sports Center; Category: Contender; Prize: $100,000; Draws: 32MS/32WS/16MD/16WD/16XD	(Japan) Sora Matsushima	(South Korea) An Jae-hyun
8–13 April	WTT Contender Taiyuan: Location: Taiyuan, China; Venue: Taiyuan Binhe Sports Center; Category: Contender; Prize: $100,000; Draws: 32MS/32WS/16MD/16WD/16XD	Score: 4–3 (11–9, 8–11, 11–4, 8–11, 11–8, 5–11, 12–10)	
8–13 April	WTT Contender Taiyuan: Location: Taiyuan, China; Venue: Taiyuan Binhe Sports Center; Category: Contender; Prize: $100,000; Draws: 32MS/32WS/16MD/16WD/16XD	(Japan) Honoka Hashimoto	(Macau) Zhu Yuling
8–13 April	WTT Contender Taiyuan: Location: Taiyuan, China; Venue: Taiyuan Binhe Sports Center; Category: Contender; Prize: $100,000; Draws: 32MS/32WS/16MD/16WD/16XD	Score: 4–0 (11–8, 11–5, 11–8, 11–5)	
8–13 April	WTT Contender Taiyuan: Location: Taiyuan, China; Venue: Taiyuan Binhe Sports Center; Category: Contender; Prize: $100,000; Draws: 32MS/32WS/16MD/16WD/16XD	(China) Xu Yingbin (China) Xiang Peng	(Hong Kong) Wong Chun-ting (Hong Kong) Chan Baldwin
8–13 April	WTT Contender Taiyuan: Location: Taiyuan, China; Venue: Taiyuan Binhe Sports Center; Category: Contender; Prize: $100,000; Draws: 32MS/32WS/16MD/16WD/16XD	Score: 3–1 (11–6, 11–3, 8–11, 11–9)	
8–13 April	WTT Contender Taiyuan: Location: Taiyuan, China; Venue: Taiyuan Binhe Sports Center; Category: Contender; Prize: $100,000; Draws: 32MS/32WS/16MD/16WD/16XD	(South Korea) Kim Nayeong (South Korea) Ryu Hanna	(China) Chen Yi (China) Xu Yi
8–13 April	WTT Contender Taiyuan: Location: Taiyuan, China; Venue: Taiyuan Binhe Sports Center; Category: Contender; Prize: $100,000; Draws: 32MS/32WS/16MD/16WD/16XD	Score: 3–2 (11–9, 4–11, 11–5, 4–11, 11–6)	
8–13 April	WTT Contender Taiyuan: Location: Taiyuan, China; Venue: Taiyuan Binhe Sports Center; Category: Contender; Prize: $100,000; Draws: 32MS/32WS/16MD/16WD/16XD	(South Korea) Lim Jong-hoon (South Korea) Kim Nayeong	(China) Xue Fei (China) Qian Tianyi
8–13 April	WTT Contender Taiyuan: Location: Taiyuan, China; Venue: Taiyuan Binhe Sports Center; Category: Contender; Prize: $100,000; Draws: 32MS/32WS/16MD/16WD/16XD	Score: 3–1 (11–8, 7–11, 11–6, 12–10)	
22–27 April	WTT Contender Tunis: Location: Tunis, Tunisia; Venue: Salle Omnisport de Rades; Category: Contender; Prize: $100,000; Draws: 32MS/32WS/16MD/16WD/16XD	(France) Felix Lebrun	(Denmark) Anders Lind
22–27 April	WTT Contender Tunis: Location: Tunis, Tunisia; Venue: Salle Omnisport de Rades; Category: Contender; Prize: $100,000; Draws: 32MS/32WS/16MD/16WD/16XD	Score: 4–0 (11–6, 12–10, 11–9, 11–9)	
22–27 April	WTT Contender Tunis: Location: Tunis, Tunisia; Venue: Salle Omnisport de Rades; Category: Contender; Prize: $100,000; Draws: 32MS/32WS/16MD/16WD/16XD	(Japan) Miwa Harimoto	(Japan) Hina Hayata
22–27 April	WTT Contender Tunis: Location: Tunis, Tunisia; Venue: Salle Omnisport de Rades; Category: Contender; Prize: $100,000; Draws: 32MS/32WS/16MD/16WD/16XD	Score: 4–1 (13–11, 11–2, 11–9, 7–11, 13–11)	
22–27 April	WTT Contender Tunis: Location: Tunis, Tunisia; Venue: Salle Omnisport de Rades; Category: Contender; Prize: $100,000; Draws: 32MS/32WS/16MD/16WD/16XD	(Germany) Benedikt Duda (Germany) Andre Bertelsmeier	(China) Li Hechen (China) Wu Yifei
22–27 April	WTT Contender Tunis: Location: Tunis, Tunisia; Venue: Salle Omnisport de Rades; Category: Contender; Prize: $100,000; Draws: 32MS/32WS/16MD/16WD/16XD	Score: 3–1 (6–11, 11–9, 11–9, 11–6)	
22–27 April	WTT Contender Tunis: Location: Tunis, Tunisia; Venue: Salle Omnisport de Rades; Category: Contender; Prize: $100,000; Draws: 32MS/32WS/16MD/16WD/16XD	(Japan) Miwa Harimoto (Japan) Miyuu Kihara	(Japan) Satsuki Odo (Japan) Sakura Yokoi
22–27 April	WTT Contender Tunis: Location: Tunis, Tunisia; Venue: Salle Omnisport de Rades; Category: Contender; Prize: $100,000; Draws: 32MS/32WS/16MD/16WD/16XD	Score: 3–1 (5–11, 11–9, 11–8, 11–3)	
22–27 April	WTT Contender Tunis: Location: Tunis, Tunisia; Venue: Salle Omnisport de Rades; Category: Contender; Prize: $100,000; Draws: 32MS/32WS/16MD/16WD/16XD	(India) Manush Shah (India) Diya Chitale	(Japan) Sora Matsushima (Japan) Miwa Harimoto
22–27 April	WTT Contender Tunis: Location: Tunis, Tunisia; Venue: Salle Omnisport de Rades; Category: Contender; Prize: $100,000; Draws: 32MS/32WS/16MD/16WD/16XD	Score: 3–2 (11–9, 5–11, 14–12, 3–11, 11–6)	

June
Date	Tournament	Champions	Runners-up
9–15 June	WTT Contender Skopje: Location: Skopje, North Macedonia; Venue: Sports Center Jane Sandanski; Category: Contender; Prize: $100,000; Draws: 32MS/32WS/16MD/16WD/16XD	(Germany) Benedikt Duda	(China) Wen Ruibo
9–15 June	WTT Contender Skopje: Location: Skopje, North Macedonia; Venue: Sports Center Jane Sandanski; Category: Contender; Prize: $100,000; Draws: 32MS/32WS/16MD/16WD/16XD	Score: 4-2(9–11,11-6,5-11,13-11,11-6,11-0)	
9–15 June	WTT Contender Skopje: Location: Skopje, North Macedonia; Venue: Sports Center Jane Sandanski; Category: Contender; Prize: $100,000; Draws: 32MS/32WS/16MD/16WD/16XD	(France) Jia Nan Yuan	(China) Fan Shuhan
9–15 June	WTT Contender Skopje: Location: Skopje, North Macedonia; Venue: Sports Center Jane Sandanski; Category: Contender; Prize: $100,000; Draws: 32MS/32WS/16MD/16WD/16XD	Score: 4-0(11–3,12-10,11-9,11-6)	
9–15 June	WTT Contender Skopje: Location: Skopje, North Macedonia; Venue: Sports Center Jane Sandanski; Category: Contender; Prize: $100,000; Draws: 32MS/32WS/16MD/16WD/16XD	(South Korea) Lim Jonghoon (South Korea) Oh Junsung	(India) Manav Thakkar (India) Manush Shah
9–15 June	WTT Contender Skopje: Location: Skopje, North Macedonia; Venue: Sports Center Jane Sandanski; Category: Contender; Prize: $100,000; Draws: 32MS/32WS/16MD/16WD/16XD	Score: 3-0(11–9,11-7,11-9)	
9–15 June	WTT Contender Skopje: Location: Skopje, North Macedonia; Venue: Sports Center Jane Sandanski; Category: Contender; Prize: $100,000; Draws: 32MS/32WS/16MD/16WD/16XD	(South Korea) Kim Naeyong (South Korea) Ryu Hanna	(Japan) Satsuki Odo (Japan) Sakura Yokoi
9–15 June	WTT Contender Skopje: Location: Skopje, North Macedonia; Venue: Sports Center Jane Sandanski; Category: Contender; Prize: $100,000; Draws: 32MS/32WS/16MD/16WD/16XD	Score: 3-1(11–13,11-9,11-1,11-7)	
9–15 June	WTT Contender Skopje: Location: Skopje, North Macedonia; Venue: Sports Center Jane Sandanski; Category: Contender; Prize: $100,000; Draws: 32MS/32WS/16MD/16WD/16XD	(Sweden) Kristian Karlsson (Sweden) Christina Kallberg	(China) Zeng Beixun (China) Feng Yixuan
9–15 June	WTT Contender Skopje: Location: Skopje, North Macedonia; Venue: Sports Center Jane Sandanski; Category: Contender; Prize: $100,000; Draws: 32MS/32WS/16MD/16WD/16XD	Score: 3-2(11–2,5-11,11-7,2-11,11-9)	
17–22 June	WTT Star Contender Ljubljana: Location: Ljubljana, Slovenia; Venue: Hala Tivoli; Category: Star Contender; Prize: $300,000; Draws: 48MS/48WS/16MD/16WD/16XD	(Brazil) Hugo Calderano	(France) Felix Lebrun
17–22 June	WTT Star Contender Ljubljana: Location: Ljubljana, Slovenia; Venue: Hala Tivoli; Category: Star Contender; Prize: $300,000; Draws: 48MS/48WS/16MD/16WD/16XD	Score: 4-2(12–10,15-13,11-13,8-11,11-9,11-6)	
17–22 June	WTT Star Contender Ljubljana: Location: Ljubljana, Slovenia; Venue: Hala Tivoli; Category: Star Contender; Prize: $300,000; Draws: 48MS/48WS/16MD/16WD/16XD	(Japan) Miyu Nagasaki	(Japan) Miyuu Kihara
17–22 June	WTT Star Contender Ljubljana: Location: Ljubljana, Slovenia; Venue: Hala Tivoli; Category: Star Contender; Prize: $300,000; Draws: 48MS/48WS/16MD/16WD/16XD	Score: 4-1(12–10,11-2,11-4,7-11,11-6)	
17–22 June	WTT Star Contender Ljubljana: Location: Ljubljana, Slovenia; Venue: Hala Tivoli; Category: Star Contender; Prize: $300,000; Draws: 48MS/48WS/16MD/16WD/16XD	(South Korea) An Jaehyun (South Korea) Lim Jongyoon	(France) Alexis Lebrun (France) Felix Lebrun
17–22 June	WTT Star Contender Ljubljana: Location: Ljubljana, Slovenia; Venue: Hala Tivoli; Category: Star Contender; Prize: $300,000; Draws: 48MS/48WS/16MD/16WD/16XD	Score: 3-0(11–9,11-9,12-10)	
17–22 June	WTT Star Contender Ljubljana: Location: Ljubljana, Slovenia; Venue: Hala Tivoli; Category: Star Contender; Prize: $300,000; Draws: 48MS/48WS/16MD/16WD/16XD	(Japan) Miwa Harimoto (Japan) Satsuki Odo	(South Korea) Choi Hyojoo (South Korea) Shin Yubin
17–22 June	WTT Star Contender Ljubljana: Location: Ljubljana, Slovenia; Venue: Hala Tivoli; Category: Star Contender; Prize: $300,000; Draws: 48MS/48WS/16MD/16WD/16XD	Score: 3-1(12–10,11-4,9-11,11-5)	
17–22 June	WTT Star Contender Ljubljana: Location: Ljubljana, Slovenia; Venue: Hala Tivoli; Category: Star Contender; Prize: $300,000; Draws: 48MS/48WS/16MD/16WD/16XD	(South Korea) Lim Jongjoon (South Korea) Shin Yubin	(Brazil) Hugo Calderano (Brazil) Bruna Takahashi
17–22 June	WTT Star Contender Ljubljana: Location: Ljubljana, Slovenia; Venue: Hala Tivoli; Category: Star Contender; Prize: $300,000; Draws: 48MS/48WS/16MD/16WD/16XD	Score: 3-0(12–10,11-7,11-7)	
24–29 June	WTT Contender Zagreb: Location: Zagreb, Croatia; Venue: Arena Zagreb; Category: Contender; Prize: $100,000; Draws: 32MS/32WS/16MD/16WD/16XD	(Japan) Tomokazu Harimoto	(China) Chen Yuanyu
24–29 June	WTT Contender Zagreb: Location: Zagreb, Croatia; Venue: Arena Zagreb; Category: Contender; Prize: $100,000; Draws: 32MS/32WS/16MD/16WD/16XD	Score: 4-0(13-11,11-4,11-8,11-9)	
24–29 June	WTT Contender Zagreb: Location: Zagreb, Croatia; Venue: Arena Zagreb; Category: Contender; Prize: $100,000; Draws: 32MS/32WS/16MD/16WD/16XD	(Japan) Satsuki Odo	(China) Shi Xunyao
24–29 June	WTT Contender Zagreb: Location: Zagreb, Croatia; Venue: Arena Zagreb; Category: Contender; Prize: $100,000; Draws: 32MS/32WS/16MD/16WD/16XD	Score: 4-2(9–11,11-6,8-11,11-4,11-8,11-5)	
24–29 June	WTT Contender Zagreb: Location: Zagreb, Croatia; Venue: Arena Zagreb; Category: Contender; Prize: $100,000; Draws: 32MS/32WS/16MD/16WD/16XD	(Hong Kong) Wong Chun Ting (Hong Kong) Chan Baldwin	(China) Huang Youzheng (China) Xue Fei
24–29 June	WTT Contender Zagreb: Location: Zagreb, Croatia; Venue: Arena Zagreb; Category: Contender; Prize: $100,000; Draws: 32MS/32WS/16MD/16WD/16XD	Score: 3-2(11–8,10-12,11-8,11-13,12-10)	
24–29 June	WTT Contender Zagreb: Location: Zagreb, Croatia; Venue: Arena Zagreb; Category: Contender; Prize: $100,000; Draws: 32MS/32WS/16MD/16WD/16XD	(Japan) Miwa Harimoto (Japan) Satsuki Odo	(Japan) Sakura Yokoi (Japan) Hitomi Sato
24–29 June	WTT Contender Zagreb: Location: Zagreb, Croatia; Venue: Arena Zagreb; Category: Contender; Prize: $100,000; Draws: 32MS/32WS/16MD/16WD/16XD	Score: 3-2(13–11,11-3,9-11,7-11,6-11)	
24–29 June	WTT Contender Zagreb: Location: Zagreb, Croatia; Venue: Arena Zagreb; Category: Contender; Prize: $100,000; Draws: 32MS/32WS/16MD/16WD/16XD	(South Korea) Lim Jonghoon (South Korea) Shin Yubin	(China) Huang Youzheng (China) Chen Yi
24–29 June	WTT Contender Zagreb: Location: Zagreb, Croatia; Venue: Arena Zagreb; Category: Contender; Prize: $100,000; Draws: 32MS/32WS/16MD/16WD/16XD	Score: 3-0(12–10,11-8,11-9)	

July
Date	Tournament	Champions	Runners-up
3–13 July	United States Smash: Location: Las Vegas, USA; Venue: Orleans Arena; Category: Grand Smash; Prize: $1,550,000; Draws: 64MS/64WS/24MD/24WD/24XD	(China) Wang Chuqin	(Japan) Tomokazu Harimoto
3–13 July	United States Smash: Location: Las Vegas, USA; Venue: Orleans Arena; Category: Grand Smash; Prize: $1,550,000; Draws: 64MS/64WS/24MD/24WD/24XD	Score: 4-0(11–3,11-6,12-10,11-8)	
3–13 July	United States Smash: Location: Las Vegas, USA; Venue: Orleans Arena; Category: Grand Smash; Prize: $1,550,000; Draws: 64MS/64WS/24MD/24WD/24XD	(Macau) Zhu Yuling	(China) Chen Yi
3–13 July	United States Smash: Location: Las Vegas, USA; Venue: Orleans Arena; Category: Grand Smash; Prize: $1,550,000; Draws: 64MS/64WS/24MD/24WD/24XD	Score: 4-2(7–11,8-11,11-7,11-5,11-9,11-8)	
3–13 July	United States Smash: Location: Las Vegas, USA; Venue: Orleans Arena; Category: Grand Smash; Prize: $1,550,000; Draws: 64MS/64WS/24MD/24WD/24XD	(South Korea) An Jaehyun (South Korea) Lim Jonghoon	(France) Alexis Lebrun (France) Félix Lebrun
3–13 July	United States Smash: Location: Las Vegas, USA; Venue: Orleans Arena; Category: Grand Smash; Prize: $1,550,000; Draws: 64MS/64WS/24MD/24WD/24XD	Score: 3-1(4–11,13-11,11-5,11-6)	
3–13 July	United States Smash: Location: Las Vegas, USA; Venue: Orleans Arena; Category: Grand Smash; Prize: $1,550,000; Draws: 64MS/64WS/24MD/24WD/24XD	(China) Wang Yidi (China) Kuai Man	(China) Sun Yingsha (China) Wang Manyu
3–13 July	United States Smash: Location: Las Vegas, USA; Venue: Orleans Arena; Category: Grand Smash; Prize: $1,550,000; Draws: 64MS/64WS/24MD/24WD/24XD	Score: 3-2(14–16,11-5,11-6,8-11,11-9)	
3–13 July	United States Smash: Location: Las Vegas, USA; Venue: Orleans Arena; Category: Grand Smash; Prize: $1,550,000; Draws: 64MS/64WS/24MD/24WD/24XD	(China) Lin Shidong (China) Kuai Man	(South Korea) Lim Jonghoon (South Korea) Shin Yubin
3–13 July	United States Smash: Location: Las Vegas, USA; Venue: Orleans Arena; Category: Grand Smash; Prize: $1,550,000; Draws: 64MS/64WS/24MD/24WD/24XD	Score: 3-0(13–11,16-14,11-6)	
22–26 July	WTT Contender Lagos: Location: Lagos, Nigeria; Venue: Sir Molade Okoya Thomas Indoor Sports Hall; Category: Contender; Prize: $100,000; Draws: 32MS/32WS/16MD/16WD/16XD	(Denmark) Anders Lind	(Croatia) Tomislav Pucar
22–26 July	WTT Contender Lagos: Location: Lagos, Nigeria; Venue: Sir Molade Okoya Thomas Indoor Sports Hall; Category: Contender; Prize: $100,000; Draws: 32MS/32WS/16MD/16WD/16XD	Score: 4-1(11–4,13-11,10-12,13-11,11-7)	
22–26 July	WTT Contender Lagos: Location: Lagos, Nigeria; Venue: Sir Molade Okoya Thomas Indoor Sports Hall; Category: Contender; Prize: $100,000; Draws: 32MS/32WS/16MD/16WD/16XD	(Japan) Honoka Hashimoto	(India) Sreeja Akula
22–26 July	WTT Contender Lagos: Location: Lagos, Nigeria; Venue: Sir Molade Okoya Thomas Indoor Sports Hall; Category: Contender; Prize: $100,000; Draws: 32MS/32WS/16MD/16WD/16XD	Score: 4-1(11–7,11-3,11-4,9-11,13-11)	
22–26 July	WTT Contender Lagos: Location: Lagos, Nigeria; Venue: Sir Molade Okoya Thomas Indoor Sports Hall; Category: Contender; Prize: $100,000; Draws: 32MS/32WS/16MD/16WD/16XD	(India) Sathiyan Gnanasekaran (India) Akash Pal	(France) Leo De Noderest (France) Jules Rolland
22–26 July	WTT Contender Lagos: Location: Lagos, Nigeria; Venue: Sir Molade Okoya Thomas Indoor Sports Hall; Category: Contender; Prize: $100,000; Draws: 32MS/32WS/16MD/16WD/16XD	Score: 3-0(11–9,11-4,11-9)	
22–26 July	WTT Contender Lagos: Location: Lagos, Nigeria; Venue: Sir Molade Okoya Thomas Indoor Sports Hall; Category: Contender; Prize: $100,000; Draws: 32MS/32WS/16MD/16WD/16XD	(South Korea) Kim Nayeong (South Korea) Ryu Hanna	(Egypt) Hana Goda (Egypt) Dina Meshref
22–26 July	WTT Contender Lagos: Location: Lagos, Nigeria; Venue: Sir Molade Okoya Thomas Indoor Sports Hall; Category: Contender; Prize: $100,000; Draws: 32MS/32WS/16MD/16WD/16XD	Score: 3-2(8–11,11-4,11-7,9-11,11-6)	
22–26 July	WTT Contender Lagos: Location: Lagos, Nigeria; Venue: Sir Molade Okoya Thomas Indoor Sports Hall; Category: Contender; Prize: $100,000; Draws: 32MS/32WS/16MD/16WD/16XD	(France) Jules Rolland (France) Prithika Pavarde	(India) Akash Pal (India) Poymantee Baisya
22–26 July	WTT Contender Lagos: Location: Lagos, Nigeria; Venue: Sir Molade Okoya Thomas Indoor Sports Hall; Category: Contender; Prize: $100,000; Draws: 32MS/32WS/16MD/16WD/16XD	Score: 3-1(12–10,11-6,6-11,11-7)	
22–27 July	WTT Contender Buenos Aires: Location: Buenos Aires, Argentina; Venue: Parque Olímpico Buenos Aires Argentina; Category: Contender; Prize: $100,000; Draws: 32MS/32WS/16MD/16WD/16XD	(Brazil) Hugo Calderano	(Japan) Mizuki Oikawa
22–27 July	WTT Contender Buenos Aires: Location: Buenos Aires, Argentina; Venue: Parque Olímpico Buenos Aires Argentina; Category: Contender; Prize: $100,000; Draws: 32MS/32WS/16MD/16WD/16XD	Score: 4-1(11–5,12-10,10-12,11-7,11-5)	
22–27 July	WTT Contender Buenos Aires: Location: Buenos Aires, Argentina; Venue: Parque Olímpico Buenos Aires Argentina; Category: Contender; Prize: $100,000; Draws: 32MS/32WS/16MD/16WD/16XD	(Japan) Miwa Harimoto	(Chinese Taipei) Cheng I-Ching
22–27 July	WTT Contender Buenos Aires: Location: Buenos Aires, Argentina; Venue: Parque Olímpico Buenos Aires Argentina; Category: Contender; Prize: $100,000; Draws: 32MS/32WS/16MD/16WD/16XD	Score: 4-2(11–4,11-8,6-11,5-11,11-8,11-4)	
22–27 July	WTT Contender Buenos Aires: Location: Buenos Aires, Argentina; Venue: Parque Olímpico Buenos Aires Argentina; Category: Contender; Prize: $100,000; Draws: 32MS/32WS/16MD/16WD/16XD	(Japan) Kazuki Hamada (Japan) Hiromu Kobayashi	(India) Payas Jain (India) Ankur Bhattacharjee
22–27 July	WTT Contender Buenos Aires: Location: Buenos Aires, Argentina; Venue: Parque Olímpico Buenos Aires Argentina; Category: Contender; Prize: $100,000; Draws: 32MS/32WS/16MD/16WD/16XD	Score: 3-1(11–5,11-7,9-11,11-9)	
22–27 July	WTT Contender Buenos Aires: Location: Buenos Aires, Argentina; Venue: Parque Olímpico Buenos Aires Argentina; Category: Contender; Prize: $100,000; Draws: 32MS/32WS/16MD/16WD/16XD	(Japan) Miwa Harimoto (Japan) Satsuki Odo	(Japan) Sakura Yokoi (Japan) Hitomi Sato
22–27 July	WTT Contender Buenos Aires: Location: Buenos Aires, Argentina; Venue: Parque Olímpico Buenos Aires Argentina; Category: Contender; Prize: $100,000; Draws: 32MS/32WS/16MD/16WD/16XD	Score: 3-2(11–6,11-6,11-13,9-11,11-9)	
22–27 July	WTT Contender Buenos Aires: Location: Buenos Aires, Argentina; Venue: Parque Olímpico Buenos Aires Argentina; Category: Contender; Prize: $100,000; Draws: 32MS/32WS/16MD/16WD/16XD	(Brazil) Hugo Calderano (Brazil) Bruna Takahashi	(India) Harmeet Desai (India) Yashaswini Ghorpade
22–27 July	WTT Contender Buenos Aires: Location: Buenos Aires, Argentina; Venue: Parque Olímpico Buenos Aires Argentina; Category: Contender; Prize: $100,000; Draws: 32MS/32WS/16MD/16WD/16XD	Score: 3-0(17–15,11-7,13-11)	
29 July-3 August	WTT Star Contender Foz do Iguaçu: Location: Foz do Iguaçu, Brazil; Venue: Rafain Convention Center; Category: Star Contender; Prize: $300,000; Draws: 48MS/48WS/16MD/16WD/16XD	(Brazil) Hugo Calderano	(Germany) Benedikt Duda
29 July-3 August	WTT Star Contender Foz do Iguaçu: Location: Foz do Iguaçu, Brazil; Venue: Rafain Convention Center; Category: Star Contender; Prize: $300,000; Draws: 48MS/48WS/16MD/16WD/16XD	Score: 4-3(11–7,11-7,9-11,11-8,9-11,10-12,11-8)	
29 July-3 August	WTT Star Contender Foz do Iguaçu: Location: Foz do Iguaçu, Brazil; Venue: Rafain Convention Center; Category: Star Contender; Prize: $300,000; Draws: 48MS/48WS/16MD/16WD/16XD	(Japan) Miwa Harimoto	(Japan) Miyu Nagasaki
29 July-3 August	WTT Star Contender Foz do Iguaçu: Location: Foz do Iguaçu, Brazil; Venue: Rafain Convention Center; Category: Star Contender; Prize: $300,000; Draws: 48MS/48WS/16MD/16WD/16XD	Score: 4-2(9–11,11-9,11-5,5-11,11-9,11-9)	
29 July-3 August	WTT Star Contender Foz do Iguaçu: Location: Foz do Iguaçu, Brazil; Venue: Rafain Convention Center; Category: Star Contender; Prize: $300,000; Draws: 48MS/48WS/16MD/16WD/16XD	(Germany) Benedikt Duda (Germany) Dang Qiu	(India) Manush Shah (India) Manav Thakkar
29 July-3 August	WTT Star Contender Foz do Iguaçu: Location: Foz do Iguaçu, Brazil; Venue: Rafain Convention Center; Category: Star Contender; Prize: $300,000; Draws: 48MS/48WS/16MD/16WD/16XD	Score: 3-2(11–3,7-11,11-7,13-15,11-5)	
29 July-3 August	WTT Star Contender Foz do Iguaçu: Location: Foz do Iguaçu, Brazil; Venue: Rafain Convention Center; Category: Star Contender; Prize: $300,000; Draws: 48MS/48WS/16MD/16WD/16XD	(Japan) Miwa Harimoto (Japan) Satsuki Odo	(South Korea) Kim Nayeong (South Korea) Ryu Hanna
29 July-3 August	WTT Star Contender Foz do Iguaçu: Location: Foz do Iguaçu, Brazil; Venue: Rafain Convention Center; Category: Star Contender; Prize: $300,000; Draws: 48MS/48WS/16MD/16WD/16XD	Score: 3-0(11–5,11-3,11-7)	
29 July-3 August	WTT Star Contender Foz do Iguaçu: Location: Foz do Iguaçu, Brazil; Venue: Rafain Convention Center; Category: Star Contender; Prize: $300,000; Draws: 48MS/48WS/16MD/16WD/16XD	(Japan) Satoshi Aida (Japan) Honoka Hashimoto	(India) Manush Shah (India) Diya Chitale
29 July-3 August	WTT Star Contender Foz do Iguaçu: Location: Foz do Iguaçu, Brazil; Venue: Rafain Convention Center; Category: Star Contender; Prize: $300,000; Draws: 48MS/48WS/16MD/16WD/16XD	Score: 3-2(11–4,8-11,5-11,11-5,11-2)	

August
Date	Tournament	Champions	Runners-up
7–11 August	WTT Champions Yokohama: Location: Yokohama, Japan; Venue: Yokohama Buntai; Category: Champions; Prize: $500,000; Draws: 32MS/32WS	(Japan) Tomokazu Harimoto	(China) Wang Chuqin
7–11 August	WTT Champions Yokohama: Location: Yokohama, Japan; Venue: Yokohama Buntai; Category: Champions; Prize: $500,000; Draws: 32MS/32WS	Score: 4-2(11–9,11-5,11-8,9-11,11-13,11-4)	
7–11 August	WTT Champions Yokohama: Location: Yokohama, Japan; Venue: Yokohama Buntai; Category: Champions; Prize: $500,000; Draws: 32MS/32WS	(China) Chen Xingtong	(China) Sun Yingsha
7–11 August	WTT Champions Yokohama: Location: Yokohama, Japan; Venue: Yokohama Buntai; Category: Champions; Prize: $500,000; Draws: 32MS/32WS	Score: 4-2(6–11,11-8,11-3,11-5,6-11,11-5)	
14–24 August	Europe Smash - Sweden: Location: Malmö, Sweden; Venue: Malmö Arena; Category: Grand Smash; Prize: $1,550,000; Draws: 64MS/64WS/24MD/24WD/24XD	(Sweden) Truls Moregard	(China) Lin Shidong
14–24 August	Europe Smash - Sweden: Location: Malmö, Sweden; Venue: Malmö Arena; Category: Grand Smash; Prize: $1,550,000; Draws: 64MS/64WS/24MD/24WD/24XD	Score: 4-3(11–8,8-11,12-10,11-8,4-11,11-13,11-9)	
14–24 August	Europe Smash - Sweden: Location: Malmö, Sweden; Venue: Malmö Arena; Category: Grand Smash; Prize: $1,550,000; Draws: 64MS/64WS/24MD/24WD/24XD	(China) Sun Yingsha	(China) Wang Manyu
14–24 August	Europe Smash - Sweden: Location: Malmö, Sweden; Venue: Malmö Arena; Category: Grand Smash; Prize: $1,550,000; Draws: 64MS/64WS/24MD/24WD/24XD	Score: 4-2(11–9,11-9,5-11,10-12,11-6,11-5)	
14–24 August	Europe Smash - Sweden: Location: Malmö, Sweden; Venue: Malmö Arena; Category: Grand Smash; Prize: $1,550,000; Draws: 64MS/64WS/24MD/24WD/24XD	(Hong Kong) Wong Chun Ting (Hong Kong) Chan Baldwin	(China) Lin Shidong (China) Huang Youzheng
14–24 August	Europe Smash - Sweden: Location: Malmö, Sweden; Venue: Malmö Arena; Category: Grand Smash; Prize: $1,550,000; Draws: 64MS/64WS/24MD/24WD/24XD	Score: 3-2(7–11,11-9,4-11,11-6,11-8)	
14–24 August	Europe Smash - Sweden: Location: Malmö, Sweden; Venue: Malmö Arena; Category: Grand Smash; Prize: $1,550,000; Draws: 64MS/64WS/24MD/24WD/24XD	(China) Sun Yingsha (China) Wang Manyu	(Japan) Miwa Harimoto (Japan) Satsuki Odo
14–24 August	Europe Smash - Sweden: Location: Malmö, Sweden; Venue: Malmö Arena; Category: Grand Smash; Prize: $1,550,000; Draws: 64MS/64WS/24MD/24WD/24XD	Score: 3-2(9–11,13-11,11-8,11-13,11-2)	
14–24 August	Europe Smash - Sweden: Location: Malmö, Sweden; Venue: Malmö Arena; Category: Grand Smash; Prize: $1,550,000; Draws: 64MS/64WS/24MD/24WD/24XD	(China) Lin Shidong (China) Kuai Man	(South Korea) Lim Jonghoon (South Korea) Shin Yubin
14–24 August	Europe Smash - Sweden: Location: Malmö, Sweden; Venue: Malmö Arena; Category: Grand Smash; Prize: $1,550,000; Draws: 64MS/64WS/24MD/24WD/24XD	Score: 3-0(11–8,11-6,11-4)	

September
Date	Tournament	Champions	Runners-up
1–7 September	WTT Contender Almaty: Location: Almaty, Kazakhstan; Venue: Table Tennis Centre ADD; Category: Contender; Prize: $100,000; Draws: 32MS/32WS/16MD/16WD/16XD	(Japan) Shunsuke Togami	(China) Zhou Qihao
1–7 September	WTT Contender Almaty: Location: Almaty, Kazakhstan; Venue: Table Tennis Centre ADD; Category: Contender; Prize: $100,000; Draws: 32MS/32WS/16MD/16WD/16XD	Score: 4-2(11–5,11-8,8-11,7-11,11-9,13-11)	
1–7 September	WTT Contender Almaty: Location: Almaty, Kazakhstan; Venue: Table Tennis Centre ADD; Category: Contender; Prize: $100,000; Draws: 32MS/32WS/16MD/16WD/16XD	(Japan) Honoka Hashimoto	(China) Qin Yuxuan
1–7 September	WTT Contender Almaty: Location: Almaty, Kazakhstan; Venue: Table Tennis Centre ADD; Category: Contender; Prize: $100,000; Draws: 32MS/32WS/16MD/16WD/16XD	Score: 4-0(11–4,11-5,11-7,11-6)	
1–7 September	WTT Contender Almaty: Location: Almaty, Kazakhstan; Venue: Table Tennis Centre ADD; Category: Contender; Prize: $100,000; Draws: 32MS/32WS/16MD/16WD/16XD	(China) Yuan Licen (China) Xu Yingbin	(Japan) Sora Matsushima (Japan) Shunsuke Togami
1–7 September	WTT Contender Almaty: Location: Almaty, Kazakhstan; Venue: Table Tennis Centre ADD; Category: Contender; Prize: $100,000; Draws: 32MS/32WS/16MD/16WD/16XD	Score: 3-0(11–8,11-9,11-6)	
1–7 September	WTT Contender Almaty: Location: Almaty, Kazakhstan; Venue: Table Tennis Centre ADD; Category: Contender; Prize: $100,000; Draws: 32MS/32WS/16MD/16WD/16XD	(Japan) Honoka Hashimoto (Japan) Hitomi Sato	(China) Shi Xunyao (China) Qian Tianyi
1–7 September	WTT Contender Almaty: Location: Almaty, Kazakhstan; Venue: Table Tennis Centre ADD; Category: Contender; Prize: $100,000; Draws: 32MS/32WS/16MD/16WD/16XD	Score: 3-0(11–5,11-4,11-6)	
1–7 September	WTT Contender Almaty: Location: Almaty, Kazakhstan; Venue: Table Tennis Centre ADD; Category: Contender; Prize: $100,000; Draws: 32MS/32WS/16MD/16WD/16XD	(China) Huang Youzheng (China) Shi Xunyao	(China) Xue Fei (China) Qian Tianyi
1–7 September	WTT Contender Almaty: Location: Almaty, Kazakhstan; Venue: Table Tennis Centre ADD; Category: Contender; Prize: $100,000; Draws: 32MS/32WS/16MD/16WD/16XD	Score: 3-2(11–8,6-11,9-11,11-3,11-7)	
9–14 September	WTT Champions Macao: Location: Macao; Venue: Macao East Asian Games Dome; Category: Champions; Prize: $800,000; Draws: 32MS/32WS	(China) Wang Chuqin	(Brazil) Hugo Calderano
9–14 September	WTT Champions Macao: Location: Macao; Venue: Macao East Asian Games Dome; Category: Champions; Prize: $800,000; Draws: 32MS/32WS	Score: 4-0(11–9,11-7,11-9,11-4)	
9–14 September	WTT Champions Macao: Location: Macao; Venue: Macao East Asian Games Dome; Category: Champions; Prize: $800,000; Draws: 32MS/32WS	(China) Sun Yingsha	(China) Wang Manyu
9–14 September	WTT Champions Macao: Location: Macao; Venue: Macao East Asian Games Dome; Category: Champions; Prize: $800,000; Draws: 32MS/32WS	Score: 4-3(11–8,13-15,11-9,9-11,5-11,11-9,11-6)	
25 September – 5 October	China Smash: Location: Beijing, China; Venue: Shougang Park; Category: Grand Smash; Prize: $2,050,000; Draws: 64MS/64WS/24MD/24WD/24XD	(China) Wang Chuqin	(France) Felix Lebrun
25 September – 5 October	China Smash: Location: Beijing, China; Venue: Shougang Park; Category: Grand Smash; Prize: $2,050,000; Draws: 64MS/64WS/24MD/24WD/24XD	Score: 4-0(11–7,11-2,11-5,11-7)	
25 September – 5 October	China Smash: Location: Beijing, China; Venue: Shougang Park; Category: Grand Smash; Prize: $2,050,000; Draws: 64MS/64WS/24MD/24WD/24XD	(China) Wang Manyu	(China) Sun Yingsha
25 September – 5 October	China Smash: Location: Beijing, China; Venue: Shougang Park; Category: Grand Smash; Prize: $2,050,000; Draws: 64MS/64WS/24MD/24WD/24XD	Score: 4-2(10–12,11-7,11-9,11-5,8-11,11-2)	
25 September – 5 October	China Smash: Location: Beijing, China; Venue: Shougang Park; Category: Grand Smash; Prize: $2,050,000; Draws: 64MS/64WS/24MD/24WD/24XD	(China) Lin Shidong (China) Wang Chuqin	(China) Zhou Qihao (China) Chen Junsong
25 September – 5 October	China Smash: Location: Beijing, China; Venue: Shougang Park; Category: Grand Smash; Prize: $2,050,000; Draws: 64MS/64WS/24MD/24WD/24XD	Score: 3-0(11–8,13-11,11-7)	
25 September – 5 October	China Smash: Location: Beijing, China; Venue: Shougang Park; Category: Grand Smash; Prize: $2,050,000; Draws: 64MS/64WS/24MD/24WD/24XD	(China) Kuai Man (China) Wang Manyu	(Japan) Hina Hayata (South Korea) Joo Cheonhui
25 September – 5 October	China Smash: Location: Beijing, China; Venue: Shougang Park; Category: Grand Smash; Prize: $2,050,000; Draws: 64MS/64WS/24MD/24WD/24XD	Score: 3-1(6–11,11-8,13-11,12-10)	
25 September – 5 October	China Smash: Location: Beijing, China; Venue: Shougang Park; Category: Grand Smash; Prize: $2,050,000; Draws: 64MS/64WS/24MD/24WD/24XD	(China) Wang Chuqin (China) Sun Yingsha	(China) Huang Youzheng (China) Chen Yi
25 September – 5 October	China Smash: Location: Beijing, China; Venue: Shougang Park; Category: Grand Smash; Prize: $2,050,000; Draws: 64MS/64WS/24MD/24WD/24XD	Score: 3-0(11–8,11-9,11-9)	

October
Date	Tournament	Champions	Runners-up
21–26 October	WTT Star Contender London: Location: London, England; Venue: Copper Box Arena; Category: Star Contender; Prize: $300,000; Draws: 48MS/48WS/16MD/16WD/16XD	(Germany) Dang Qiu	(Japan) Tomokazu Harimoto
21–26 October	WTT Star Contender London: Location: London, England; Venue: Copper Box Arena; Category: Star Contender; Prize: $300,000; Draws: 48MS/48WS/16MD/16WD/16XD	Score: 4-2(13–11,12-10,14-12,9-11,7-11,12-10)	
21–26 October	WTT Star Contender London: Location: London, England; Venue: Copper Box Arena; Category: Star Contender; Prize: $300,000; Draws: 48MS/48WS/16MD/16WD/16XD	(Japan) Miwa Harimoto	(Japan) Hina Hayata
21–26 October	WTT Star Contender London: Location: London, England; Venue: Copper Box Arena; Category: Star Contender; Prize: $300,000; Draws: 48MS/48WS/16MD/16WD/16XD	Score: 4-3(5–11,6-11,11-8,11-4,11-6,6-11,11-9)	
21–26 October	WTT Star Contender London: Location: London, England; Venue: Copper Box Arena; Category: Star Contender; Prize: $300,000; Draws: 48MS/48WS/16MD/16WD/16XD	(Chinese Taipei) Kuo Guan-Hong (Chinese Taipei) Feng Yi-Hsin	(Hong Kong) Wong Chun Ting (Hong Kong) Chan Baldwin
21–26 October	WTT Star Contender London: Location: London, England; Venue: Copper Box Arena; Category: Star Contender; Prize: $300,000; Draws: 48MS/48WS/16MD/16WD/16XD	Score: 3-2(9–11,12-10,9-11,11-9,11-1)	
21–26 October	WTT Star Contender London: Location: London, England; Venue: Copper Box Arena; Category: Star Contender; Prize: $300,000; Draws: 48MS/48WS/16MD/16WD/16XD	(China) Shi Xunyao (China) Zhang Xiangyu	(China) Qin Yuxuan (China) Zong Geman
21–26 October	WTT Star Contender London: Location: London, England; Venue: Copper Box Arena; Category: Star Contender; Prize: $300,000; Draws: 48MS/48WS/16MD/16WD/16XD	Score: 3-0(11–5,11-5,11-9)	
21–26 October	WTT Star Contender London: Location: London, England; Venue: Copper Box Arena; Category: Star Contender; Prize: $300,000; Draws: 48MS/48WS/16MD/16WD/16XD	(Chinese Taipei) Lin Yun-Ju (Chinese Taipei) Cheng I-Ching	(Hong Kong) Wong Chun Ting (Hong Kong) Doo Hoi Kem
21–26 October	WTT Star Contender London: Location: London, England; Venue: Copper Box Arena; Category: Star Contender; Prize: $300,000; Draws: 48MS/48WS/16MD/16WD/16XD	Score: 3-1(8–11,11-9,11-7,11-9)	
28 October – 2 November	WTT Champions Montpellier: Location: Montpellier, France; Venue: Sud de France Arena; Category: Champions; Prize: $500,000; Draws: 32MS/32WS	(Sweden) Truls Möregårdh	(Japan) Sora Matsushima
28 October – 2 November	WTT Champions Montpellier: Location: Montpellier, France; Venue: Sud de France Arena; Category: Champions; Prize: $500,000; Draws: 32MS/32WS	Score: 4-0(11–9,11-8,11-7,11-9)	
28 October – 2 November	WTT Champions Montpellier: Location: Montpellier, France; Venue: Sud de France Arena; Category: Champions; Prize: $500,000; Draws: 32MS/32WS	(China) Wang Yidi	(Germany) Sabine Winter
28 October – 2 November	WTT Champions Montpellier: Location: Montpellier, France; Venue: Sud de France Arena; Category: Champions; Prize: $500,000; Draws: 32MS/32WS	Score: 4-3(8–11,10-12,11-5,11-4,6-11,12-10,11-9)	

November
Date	Tournament	Champions	Runners-up
4–9 November	WTT Champions Frankfurt: Location: Frankfurt, Germany; Venue: Süwag Energie ARENA; Category: Champions; Prize: $500,000; Draws: 32MS/32WS	(Japan) Sora Matsushima	(Germany) Dang Qiu
4–9 November	WTT Champions Frankfurt: Location: Frankfurt, Germany; Venue: Süwag Energie ARENA; Category: Champions; Prize: $500,000; Draws: 32MS/32WS	Score: 4-1(11-8,15-13,11-13,18-16,11-9)	
4–9 November	WTT Champions Frankfurt: Location: Frankfurt, Germany; Venue: Süwag Energie ARENA; Category: Champions; Prize: $500,000; Draws: 32MS/32WS	(Japan) Hina Hayata	(Japan) Miwa Harimoto
4–9 November	WTT Champions Frankfurt: Location: Frankfurt, Germany; Venue: Süwag Energie ARENA; Category: Champions; Prize: $500,000; Draws: 32MS/32WS	Score: 4-3(11–4,11-8,4-11,6-11,11-6,9-11,11-9)	
17–22 November	WTT Star Contender Muscat: Location: Muscat, Oman; Venue: Sultan Qaboos Sport Complex; Category: Star Contender; Prize: $300,000; Draws: 48MS/48WS/16MD/16WD/16XD	(France) Felix Lebrun	(France) Alexis Lebrun
17–22 November	WTT Star Contender Muscat: Location: Muscat, Oman; Venue: Sultan Qaboos Sport Complex; Category: Star Contender; Prize: $300,000; Draws: 48MS/48WS/16MD/16WD/16XD	Score: 4-3(11-8,11-8,11-4,5-11,13-15,10-12,11-6)	
17–22 November	WTT Star Contender Muscat: Location: Muscat, Oman; Venue: Sultan Qaboos Sport Complex; Category: Star Contender; Prize: $300,000; Draws: 48MS/48WS/16MD/16WD/16XD	(Japan) Miyuu Kihara	(South Korea) Joo Cheonhui
17–22 November	WTT Star Contender Muscat: Location: Muscat, Oman; Venue: Sultan Qaboos Sport Complex; Category: Star Contender; Prize: $300,000; Draws: 48MS/48WS/16MD/16WD/16XD	Score: 4-1(11-6,10-12,11-6,11-8,11-8)	
17–22 November	WTT Star Contender Muscat: Location: Muscat, Oman; Venue: Sultan Qaboos Sport Complex; Category: Star Contender; Prize: $300,000; Draws: 48MS/48WS/16MD/16WD/16XD	(South Korea) Lim Jonghoon (South Korea) Oh Junsung	(Singapore) Pang Koen (Singapore) Quek Izaac
17–22 November	WTT Star Contender Muscat: Location: Muscat, Oman; Venue: Sultan Qaboos Sport Complex; Category: Star Contender; Prize: $300,000; Draws: 48MS/48WS/16MD/16WD/16XD	Score: 3-0(12-10,11-8,12-10)	
17–22 November	WTT Star Contender Muscat: Location: Muscat, Oman; Venue: Sultan Qaboos Sport Complex; Category: Star Contender; Prize: $300,000; Draws: 48MS/48WS/16MD/16WD/16XD	(Japan) Satsuki Odo (Japan) Sakura Yokoi	(South Korea) Joo Cheonhui (South Korea) Kim Nayeong
17–22 November	WTT Star Contender Muscat: Location: Muscat, Oman; Venue: Sultan Qaboos Sport Complex; Category: Star Contender; Prize: $300,000; Draws: 48MS/48WS/16MD/16WD/16XD	Score: 3-2(9-11,11-5,5-11,11-4,11-6)	
17–22 November	WTT Star Contender Muscat: Location: Muscat, Oman; Venue: Sultan Qaboos Sport Complex; Category: Star Contender; Prize: $300,000; Draws: 48MS/48WS/16MD/16WD/16XD	(Japan) Satomi Aida (Japan) Hitomi Sato	(Chinese Taipei) Lin Yun-Ju (Chinese Taipei) Cheng I-Ching
17–22 November	WTT Star Contender Muscat: Location: Muscat, Oman; Venue: Sultan Qaboos Sport Complex; Category: Star Contender; Prize: $300,000; Draws: 48MS/48WS/16MD/16WD/16XD	Score: 3-0(11-9,11-5,11-6)	

December
Date	Tournament	Champions	Runners-up
10-14 December	WTT Finals: Location: Hong Kong,China; Venue: Hong Kong Coliseum; Category: Finals; Prize: $1,300,000; Draws: 16MS/16WS/8XD	(Japan) Tomokazu Harimoto	(Sweden) Truls Moregard
10-14 December	WTT Finals: Location: Hong Kong,China; Venue: Hong Kong Coliseum; Category: Finals; Prize: $1,300,000; Draws: 16MS/16WS/8XD	Score: 4-2(11–8,5-11,11-9,10-12,14-12,11-2)	
10-14 December	WTT Finals: Location: Hong Kong,China; Venue: Hong Kong Coliseum; Category: Finals; Prize: $1,300,000; Draws: 16MS/16WS/8XD	(China) Wang Manyu	(China) Kuai Man
10-14 December	WTT Finals: Location: Hong Kong,China; Venue: Hong Kong Coliseum; Category: Finals; Prize: $1,300,000; Draws: 16MS/16WS/8XD	Score: 4-2(11–7,8-11,11-8,11-8,9-11,12-10)	
10-14 December	WTT Finals: Location: Hong Kong,China; Venue: Hong Kong Coliseum; Category: Finals; Prize: $1,300,000; Draws: 16MS/16WS/8XD	Score:	
10-14 December	WTT Finals: Location: Hong Kong,China; Venue: Hong Kong Coliseum; Category: Finals; Prize: $1,300,000; Draws: 16MS/16WS/8XD	Score:	
10-14 December	WTT Finals: Location: Hong Kong,China; Venue: Hong Kong Coliseum; Category: Finals; Prize: $1,300,000; Draws: 16MS/16WS/8XD	(South Korea) Lim Jonghoon (South Korea) Shin Yubin	(China) Wang Chuqin (China) Sun Yingsha
10-14 December	WTT Finals: Location: Hong Kong,China; Venue: Hong Kong Coliseum; Category: Finals; Prize: $1,300,000; Draws: 16MS/16WS/8XD	Score: 3-0(11–9,11-8,11-6)	
