= 2025 World Table Tennis Championships – Women's doubles =

Women's doubles at the 2025 World Table Tennis Championships
- Venue: Lusail Sports Arena; Qatar University Sports Complex
- Location: Doha, Qatar
- Dates: 17–25 May

Medalists
Wang Manyu; Kuai Man	China
Sofia Polcanova; Bernadette Szőcs	Austria; Romania
Miwa Harimoto; Miyuu Kihara	Japan
Shin Yu-bin; Ryu Han-na	South Korea

The women's doubles competition of the 2025 World Table Tennis Championships was held from 17 to 25 May 2025. The event was played as a straight knockout. All doubles' matches were best of 5 games.

The Chinese duo Wang Manyu and Kuai Man defeated Austria's Sofia Polcanova and Romania's Bernadette Szőcs in straight games, claiming the women's doubles title.

== Seeds ==
Doubles events had 16 seeded pairs. Seeding in doubles events was done by combining each player's ITTF Table Tennis Doubles/Mixed Doubles Individual World Ranking position to form a combined pair rank (CPR). The seeding was based on 29 April, 2025 CPR in ascending order.

1. (Japan) Satsuki Odo / (Japan) Sakura Yokoi (quarterfinals)
2. (China) Wang Manyu / (China) Kuai Man (champions)
3. (China) Chen Xingtong / (China) Qian Tianyi (second round)
4. (Japan) Miwa Harimoto / (Japan) Miyuu Kihara (semifinals)
5. (Chinese Taipei) Cheng I-ching / (Chinese Taipei) Li Yu-jhun (third round)
6. (Hong Kong) Zhu Chengzhu / (Hong Kong) Ng Wing Lam (third round)
7. (South Korea) Shin Yu-bin / (South Korea) Ryu Han-na (semifinals)
8. (Slovakia) Barbora Balážová / (Czech Republic) Hana Matelová (third round)
9. (Poland) Natalia Bajor / (Slovakia) Tatiana Kukulkova (second round)
10. (Austria) Sofia Polcanova / (Romania) Bernadette Szőcs (final)
11. (Thailand) Suthasini Sawettabut / (Thailand) Orawan Paranang (first round)
12. (India) Diya Chitale / (India) Yashaswini Ghorpade (third round)
13. (Romania) Elizabeta Samara / (Romania) Andreea Dragoman (first round)
14. (India) Sutirtha Mukherjee / (India) Ayhika Mukherjee (second round)
15. (Brazil) Giulia Takahashi / (Brazil) Laura Watanabe (first round)
16. (Serbia) Izabela Lupulesku / (Serbia) Sabina Surjan (first round)

== Draw ==
The draw took place on 30 April 2025. Players of the same association were separated only in the first round. Since there were 62 pairs in women's doubles, the top two seeded pairs got a bye in the first round.

=== Key ===
- r = Retired
- w/o = Walkover

=== Finals ===
Semifinals							Final
7	(South Korea) Shin Yu-bin (South Korea) Ryu Han-na	5	11	8	11	9
10	(Austria) Sofia Polcanova (Romania) Bernadette Szőcs	11	8	11	9	11	10	(Austria) Sofia Polcanova (Romania) Bernadette Szőcs	6	6	5
4	(Japan) Miwa Harimoto (Japan) Miyuu Kihara	8	6	5			2	(China) Wang Manyu (China) Kuai Man	11	11	11
2	(China) Wang Manyu (China) Kuai Man	11	11	11

=== Top half ===
==== Section 1 ====
First round
1	(Japan) Odo (Japan) Yokoi	11	11	11
(Ukraine) Matiunina (Ukraine) Brateyko	5	6	5
(Kazakhstan) Bakhyt (Kazakhstan) Romanovskaya	11	7	11	11
(Madagascar) Raharimanana (Madagascar) Rakotondrazaka	5	11	8	9
(Kazakhstan) Akasheva (Kazakhstan) Mirkadirova	8	14	11	6
(Singapore) Tan Z. (Singapore) Zhang W.	11	12	13	11
(Croatia) Jeger (Croatia) Rakovac	5	9	11	11	12
13	(Romania) Samara (Romania) Dragoman	11	11	8	7	10
14	(India) S. Mukherjee (India) A. Mukherjee	4	11	10	11	11
(Turkey) Yilmaz (Turkey) Harac	11	9	12	9	7
(Germany) Kaufmann (Germany) Shan	11	11	7	1
(Canada) M. Zhang (Canada) I. Liao	7	5	11	1
(Hungary) Pota (Luxembourg) De Nutte	11	11	8	7	12
(Slovenia) Tofant (Slovenia) Tokic	5	8	11	11	10
(Algeria) Bouhenni (Algeria) Nasri	3	2	5
7	(South Korea) Shin (South Korea) Ryu	11	11	11

Second round
1	(Japan) Odo (Japan) Yokoi	11	11	11
(Kazakhstan) Bakhyt (Kazakhstan) Romanovskaya	9	5	4
(Singapore) Tan Z. (Singapore) Zhang W.	6	11	13	8	8
(Croatia) Jeger (Croatia) Rakovac	11	9	11	11	11
14	(India) S. Mukherjee (India) A. Mukherjee	1	11	7
(Germany) Kaufmann (Germany) Shan	11	13	11
(Hungary) Pota (Luxembourg) De Nutte	3	7	4
7	(South Korea) Shin (South Korea) Ryu	11	11	11

Third round
1	(Japan) Odo (Japan) Yokoi	12	11	11
(Croatia) Jeger (Croatia) Rakovac	10	9	0
(Germany) Kaufmann (Germany) Shan	8	3	11	6
7	(South Korea) Shin (South Korea) Ryu	11	11	4	11

Quarterfinal
1	(Japan) Odo (Japan) Yokoi	9	11	6	16
7	(South Korea) Shin (South Korea) Ryu	11	9	11	18

==== Section 2 ====
First round
8	(Slovakia) Balážová (Czech Republic) Matelová	11	11	15
(Croatia) Malobabic (Croatia) Arapovic	9	5	13
(South Africa) Patel (South Africa) Sonday	6	7	5
(Egypt) Fathy (Egypt) Goda	11	11	11
(Ethiopia) Gulti (Ethiopia) Kinfu	6	5	13
(Mexico) Barcenas (Mexico) Cossio	11	11	15
(Zambia) Kunda (Zambia) Nalavwe	1	6	3
10	(Austria) Polcanova (Romania) Szőcs	11	11	11
16	(Serbia) Lupulesku (Serbia) Surjan	10	11	2	11	6
(Chinese Taipei) Tsai (Chinese Taipei) Huang Y-h	12	9	11	7	11
(Ethiopia) Ftwi (Ethiopia) Dejene	6	3	4
(France) Ch. Lutz (France) Hochart	11	11	11
(Qatar) A. Mohamed (Qatar) M. Ali	1	6	4
(Germany) Winter (Germany) Y. Wan	11	11	11
(Cuba) Fonseca (Cuba) Crespo	5	7	5
3	(China) Chen X. (China) Qian	11	11	11

Second round
8	(Slovakia) Balážová (Czech Republic) Matelová	6	11	11	11
(Egypt) Fathy (Egypt) Goda	11	5	9	9
(Mexico) Barcenas (Mexico) Cossio	6	5	7
10	(Austria) Polcanova (Romania) Szőcs	11	11	11
(Chinese Taipei) Tsai (Chinese Taipei) Huang Y-h	11	11	8	11
(France) Ch. Lutz (France) Hochart	8	7	11	4
(Germany) Winter (Germany) Y. Wan	5	11	9	11	11
3	(China) Chen X. (China) Qian	11	8	11	6	9

Third round
8	(Slovakia) Balážová (Czech Republic) Matelová	7	11	11	5	5
10	(Austria) Polcanova (Romania) Szőcs	11	9	9	11	11
(Chinese Taipei) Tsai (Chinese Taipei) Huang Y-h	11	11	8	7	7
(Germany) Winter (Germany) Y. Wan	8	9	11	11	11

Quarterfinal
10	(Austria) Polcanova (Romania) Szőcs	11	11	4	12
(Germany) Winter (Germany) Y. Wan	7	8	11	10

=== Bottom Half ===
==== Section 3 ====
First round
4	(Japan) M. Harimoto (Japan) Kihara	11	11	11
(Chile) Vega (Chile) Ortega	3	6	5
(United States) Moyland (United States) J. Lai	7	10	6
(France) Yuan (France) Pavade	11	12	11
(Singapore) Zeng (Singapore) Ser	11	11	11
(Uganda) Nangonzi (Uganda) Nakawala	4	1	6
(Uzbekistan) Magdieva (Uzbekistan) Erkebaeva	11	2	9	8
12	(India) Chitale (India) Ghorpade	9	11	11	11
9	(Poland) Bajor (Slovakia) Kukulkova	11	11	11
(Nigeria) Ayoola (Nigeria) Ojomu	4	3	6
(South Korea) Kim N. (South Korea) Lee E.	11	11	9	14
(Sweden) Bergström (Sweden) C. Källberg	7	8	11	12
(Switzerland) Moret (Italy) Monfardini	11	10	15	5	14
(Australia) Wu (Australia) Psihogios	7	12	13	11	12
(New Zealand) J. Lam (New Zealand) Gear	2	3	4
5	(Chinese Taipei) Cheng (Chinese Taipei) Li	11	11	11

Second round
4	(Japan) M. Harimoto (Japan) Kihara	17	11	11
(France) Yuan (France) Pavade	15	3	4
(Singapore) Zeng (Singapore) Ser	11	6	6	9
12	(India) Chitale (India) Ghorpade	6	11	11	11
9	(Poland) Bajor (Slovakia) Kukulkova	7	12	13	10
(South Korea) Kim N. (South Korea) Lee E.	11	10	15	12
(Switzerland) Moret (Italy) Monfardini	7	12	5	5
5	(Chinese Taipei) Cheng (Chinese Taipei) Li	11	10	11	11

Third round
4	(Japan) M. Harimoto (Japan) Kihara	11	11	11
12	(India) Chitale (India) Ghorpade	7	8	9
(South Korea) Kim N. (South Korea) Lee E.	12	11	9	11
5	(Chinese Taipei) Cheng (Chinese Taipei) Li	10	8	11	5

Quarterfinal
4	(Japan) M. Harimoto (Japan) Kihara	11	11	11
(South Korea) Kim N. (South Korea) Lee E.	3	5	8

==== Section 4 ====
First round
6	(Hong Kong) Zhu (Hong Kong) Ng	w	/	o
(Wales) Carey (Wales) Hursey
(Angola) Tavares (Angola) Albino	4	6	3
(Egypt) M. Alhodaby (Egypt) M. Alhodaby	11	11	11
(Serbia) Todorovic (Turkey) Altinkaya	11	4	16	12	3
(Guatemala) Cordero (Guatemala) Zapata	7	11	18	10	11
(Spain) Xiao (Romania) Diaconu	14	11	11
15	(Brazil) G. Takahashi (Brazil) Watanabe	12	4	8
11	(Thailand) S. Sawettabut (Thailand) Paranang	7	11	7	4
(Hong Kong) Lee (Hong Kong) T. Kong	11	9	11	11
(Nigeria) Bello (Nigeria) Udoaka	5	6	7
(Malaysia) Chang (Malaysia) Lyne	11	11	11
(Thailand) J. Sawettabut (Thailand) Vijitviriyagul	4	7	11	9
(North Korea) Cha (North Korea) Pak	11	11	9	11
(Poland) K. Wegrzyn (Poland) Wielgos	9	5	3
2	(China) Wang M. (China) Kuai	11	11	11

Second round
6	(Hong Kong) Zhu (Hong Kong) Ng	12	11	11
(Egypt) M. Alhodaby (Egypt) M. Alhodaby	10	9	5
(Guatemala) Cordero (Guatemala) Zapata	7	4	9
(Spain) Xiao (Romania) Diaconu	11	11	11
(Hong Kong) Lee (Hong Kong) T. Kong	11	9	6	11	11
(Malaysia) Chang (Malaysia) Lyne	6	11	11	9	9
(North Korea) Cha (North Korea) Pak	6	3	9
2	(China) Wang M. (China) Kuai	11	11	11

Third round
6	(Hong Kong) Zhu (Hong Kong) Ng	11	4	10
(Spain) Xiao (Romania) Diaconu	13	11	12
(Hong Kong) Lee (Hong Kong) T. Kong	6	6	5
2	(China) Wang M. (China) Kuai	11	11	11

Quarterfinal
(Spain) Xiao (Romania) Diaconu	7	9	6
2	(China) Wang M. (China) Kuai	11	11	11
