= 2018 Asian Junior and Cadet Table Tennis Championships =

Tournament details
- Dates: 13–18 August 2018
- Edition: 24th
- Venue: Wunna Theikdi Indoor Stadium
- Location: Nay Pyi Taw, Myanmar

The 2018 Asian Junior and Cadet Table Tennis Championships were held in Nay Pyi Taw, Myanmar, from 13 to 18 August 2018. It was organised by the Myanmar Table Tennis Federation under the authority of Asian Table Tennis Union (ATTU).

== Medal summary ==
=== Events ===
Event	Gold	Silver	Bronze
Junior boys' singles	China; Xiang Peng	China; Niu Guankai	China; Xu Yingbin
Junior boys' singles	China; Xiang Peng	China; Niu Guankai	China; Yu Heyi
Junior girls' singles	China; Qian Tianyi	China; Shi Xunyao	Hong Kong; Lee Ka Yee Karisa
Junior girls' singles	China; Qian Tianyi	China; Shi Xunyao	Japan; Miyuu Kihara
Junior boys' doubles	China; Xu Yingbin; Yu Heyi	South Korea; Choi Inhyeok; Kwak Yubin	India; Jeet Chandra; Fidel Rafeeque Snehit Surajjulaa
Junior boys' doubles	China; Xu Yingbin; Yu Heyi	South Korea; Choi Inhyeok; Kwak Yubin	India; Manav Vikash Thakkar; Manush Utpalbhai Shah
Junior girls' doubles	South Korea; Shin Yubin; Ryu Hanna	Japan; Yumeno Soma; Haruna Ojio	China; Qian Tianyi; Shi Xunyao
Junior girls' doubles	South Korea; Shin Yubin; Ryu Hanna	Japan; Yumeno Soma; Haruna Ojio	China; Guo Yuhan; Zhang Binyue
Junior mixed doubles	China; Yu Heyi; Qian Tianyi	China; Xu Yingbin; Shi Xunyao	Chinese Taipei; Li Hsin-Yang; Chen Ting-Ting
Junior mixed doubles	China; Yu Heyi; Qian Tianyi	China; Xu Yingbin; Shi Xunyao	India; Archana Girish Kamath; Manav Vikash Thakkar
Junior boys' team	China; Niu Guankai; Xu Yingbin; Yu Heyi; Xiang Peng	India; Manav Vikash Thakkar; Jeet Chandra; Manush Utpalbhai Shah; Fidel Rafeeque Snehit Survajjula	Iran; Amin Ahmadian; Arya Amiri; Amirreza Abbasi Monjezi; Hamid Shams Shahrbabaki
Junior boys' team	China; Niu Guankai; Xu Yingbin; Yu Heyi; Xiang Peng	India; Manav Vikash Thakkar; Jeet Chandra; Manush Utpalbhai Shah; Fidel Rafeeque Snehit Survajjula	Japan; Yukiya Uda; Shunsuke Togami; Yuta Tanaka; Koyo Kanamitsu
Junior girls' team	China; Qian Tianyi; Shi Xunyao; Guo Yuhan; Zhang Binyue	Japan; Miyuu Kihara; Yumeno Soma; Miku Izumo; Moe Nomura	Hong Kong; Chau Wing Sze; Wong Chin Yau; Lee Ka Yee Karisa; Lo Tsz Kwan
Junior girls' team	China; Qian Tianyi; Shi Xunyao; Guo Yuhan; Zhang Binyue	Japan; Miyuu Kihara; Yumeno Soma; Miku Izumo; Moe Nomura	South Korea; Shin Yubin; Ryu Hanna; Wee Yeji; Lee Daeun
Cadet boys' singles	China; Zeng Beixun	China; Kuang Li	China; Xiong Mengyang
Cadet boys' singles	China; Zeng Beixun	China; Kuang Li	South Korea; Hwang Jinha
Cadet girls' singles	China; Kuai Man	China; Chen Yi	China; Li Yuqi
Cadet girls' singles	China; Kuai Man	China; Chen Yi	South Korea; Byun Seoyoung
Cadet boys' team	China; Xiong Mengyang; Kuang Li; Zeng Beixun	Japan; Hiroto Shinozuka; Kazuki Hamada; Haruki Harada	Chinese Taipei; Li Hsin-Yu; Huang Yan-Cheng; Wang Guan-Ru
Cadet boys' team	China; Xiong Mengyang; Kuang Li; Zeng Beixun	Japan; Hiroto Shinozuka; Kazuki Hamada; Haruki Harada	Hong Kong; Yu Nok; Choy Chun Kit Prince; Yiu Kwan To
Cadet girls' team	China; Chen Yi; Kuai Man; Li Yuqi	South Korea; Kim Jimin; Byun Seoyoung; Kim Seongjin	Chinese Taipei; Tsai Yun-En; Tsai Pei-Rung; Huang Yu-Jie
Cadet girls' team	China; Chen Yi; Kuai Man; Li Yuqi	South Korea; Kim Jimin; Byun Seoyoung; Kim Seongjin	Japan; Haruna Ojio; Hikari Okubo; Kaho Akae

=== Medal table ===
Rank	Nation	Gold	Silver	Bronze	Total
1	China	10	5	6	21
2	South Korea	1	2	3	6
3	Japan	0	3	3	6
4	India	0	1	3	4
5	Chinese Taipei	0	0	3	3
5	Hong Kong	0	0	3	3
7	Iran	0	0	1	1
Totals (7 entries)		11	11	22	44

== See also ==
- 2018 World Junior Table Tennis Championships
- Asian Table Tennis Championships
- Asian Table Tennis Union
