= 2026 WTT Series =

Table tennis tournament

2026 World Table Tennis Series
Tournament details
- Dates: 7 January 2026 –
- Edition: 5th

The 2026 WTT series was the 6th season of the World Table Tennis's professional table tennis world tour.

== Key ==
WTT Grand Smash
WTT Cup Finals
WTT Champions
WTT Star Contender
WTT Contender

== Winners ==
Tour	Report	Men's singles	Women's singles	Men's doubles	Women's doubles	Mixed doubles
Grand Smash
Singapore Smash (Singapore Sports Hub, 30 Jan - 9 Feb)		(China) Wang Chuqin	(China) Sun Yingsha	(France) Felix Lebrun (France) Alexis Lebrun		
