= World Table Tennis (magazine) =

Japanese sports magazine

- Cover of the October 2005 issue featuring five-year-old Miu Hirano
- Editor: Noboru Konno
- Categories: Sports magazine
- Frequency: Monthly
- First issue: January 1997
- Country: Japan
- Based in: Tokyo, Japan
- Language: Japanese
- Website: world-tt.com

World Table Tennis (卓球王国, Takkyū Ōkoku, "Table Tennis Kingdom") is a Japanese monthly sports magazine devoted to the sport of table tennis. Although significantly more expensive (720¥ per issue) than other Japanese table tennis magazines like Nittaku News and The Table Tennis Report, the magazine sells 700,000–800,000 copies annually, according to president Noboru Konno (今野昇), making it one of the most popular sports magazines in Japan.
