= Ryu Han-na =

South Korean table tennis player

Personal information
- Native name: 유한나
- Born: 20 April 2002 (age 24)

Sport
- Sport: Table tennis
- Playing style: Left-handed shakehand grip
- Highest ranking: 168 (20 February 2024)
Medal record
Women's table tennis
Representing South Korea
World Championships
Bronze medal – third place	2025 Doha	Doubles

Ryu Han-na (Korean: 유한나; born 20 April 2002) is a South Korean table tennis player.

== Career ==
During her junior career, Ryu represented South Korea in numerous international youth competitions, including winning the junior girls' doubles title with Shin Yu-bin at the 2018 Asian Junior and Cadet Table Tennis Championships.

Following the retirement of Jeon Ji-hee, Ryu emerged as a key left-handed doubles player for the South Korean national team. In 2025, she partnered with Shin Yu-bin to reach the women's doubles final at the WTT Star Contender Chennai, where they were defeated in the deciding game by Japan's pair, Miwa Harimoto and Miyuu Kihara. Later that year, Ryu teamed up with Kim Na-yeong at the WTT Contender Taiyuan and won the women's doubles title, defeating China's Chen Yi and Xu Yi in the final.

At the 2025 World Table Tennis Championships, Ryu and Shin advanced to the semifinals of the women's doubles event, having defeated the top-seeded Japanese duo, Satsuki Odo and Sakura Yokoi, in the quarterfinals. Although they lost to Austria's Sofia Polcanova and Romania's Bernadette Szőcs in the semifinals, the pair secured a bronze medal for South Korea.
