= World Table Tennis (ITTF) =

Commercial table tennis tournament organizer

- Abbreviation: WTT
- Formation: 2019; 7 years ago
- Website: worldtabletennis.com

World Table Tennis, stylized as WTT, is an organization created by the ITTF in 2019 that runs commercialized table tennis tournaments. Its inaugural tournament was held in November 2020 in Macao. It is distinguished from the predecessor ITTF World Tour by various rules changes and big prize money for commercialized purposes. The head of its council is Liu Guoliang, a former Olympic gold medalist and former head coach of China. The WTT is headquartered in Singapore, with other offices in China, Europe, and the US.

== Background ==
In 1926, the ITTF was founded by William Henry Lawes of Wymondham and Ivor Montagu. The nine founding members were Austria, Czechoslovakia, Denmark, England, Germany, Hungary, India, Sweden and Wales. The first international tournament was held in January 1926 in Berlin, and the first World Table Tennis Championships was held in December 1926 in London. It was the only event for over 50 years that was run and managed commercially by the ITTF.

In 1980, the ITTF World Cups was introduced, followed by the ITTF World Tour in 1996. Until 2003, commercial rights for these events were passed on to the local organising committees (LOC) but a different approach was taken to centralise rights through the creation of TMS. TMS was tasked to manage these rights on behalf of ITTF, until 2017 when ITTF decided to buy back the rights to be taken in house.

In 2018, professional consultants Deloitte and Withers were engaged to assist with remodelling the way that the ITTF does business. Through full models and financial understanding of our events and other worldwide properties, ITTF sought to understand the untapped commercial potential of table tennis. One key finding led to the idea of separation between the management of the professional and institutional structures of table tennis.

On 30 May 2019, ITTF announced the idea of World Table Tennis (WTT), a new commercial vehicle for table tennis. To launch WTT, the ITTF executive committee appointed a selection panel. The panel included ITTF President Thomas Weikert, ITTF Deputy President Khalil Al-Mohannadi, ITTF Executive Vice President for Finance Petra Sorling, ITTF CEO Steve Dainton, and ITTF Marketing Director Matthew Pound.

=== Recent hires ===
China News Service newsreel about the WTT, September 2024.

WTT also announced the hire of Philippe Le Floc’h, former Chief Commercial Officer at FIFA and marketing director at UEFA, as Senior Commercial Strategy Consultant, in line with WTT's aim to commercialise the sport. Shortly afterwards, Stephen Duckitt, who had 15 years of sports management experience, primarily with WTA and ATP, was announced as WTT Event Strategy Director.

On 29 June 2020, WTT announced that China Table Tennis Association President, Liu Guoliang had accepted the role as Chair of the WTT Council. The WTT Council is tasked to ensure the healthy development of WTT and to be at the helm of the future development of table tennis. WTT Macao was announced on 11 September 2020 to be held between 25 and 29 November 2020. The debut event was a promotional showcase featuring 16 of the world's best male and 16 of the world's best female players. The event implemented a brand new format with innovative scoring methods. It also featured a prize purse of US$800,000 with players paid a minimum of US$15,000, and earning more prize money per match they win.

Next to join was Melissa Soobratty. Announced on 4 December 2020, the former vice president, Media at Football Marketing Asia joined as WTT Senior Media Director to oversee all areas related to content, to further professionalise the organisation's expanding media operations.

== WTT event structure ==
| Tournaments | | 2019−present | | |
|---|---|---|---|---|
| Tiers | I | Grand Smash | | |
| Tiers | II | WTT Series | WTT Finals (WTT Cup Finals) | |
| Tiers | III | WTT Series | WTT Champions (WTT Champion Series) | |
| Tiers | IV | WTT Series | WTT Contender; Series | WTT Star Contenders |
| Tiers | V | WTT Series | WTT Contender; Series | WTT Contenders |

=== Grand Smash ===
The Grand Smashes will become the pillars of the sport and the most important events in the table tennis calendar. The events will feature both Men's and Women's singles draws with more players now receiving automatic entry into events. There will be fewer seeded players and a separate qualifying draw to ensure that the excitement kicks off right from the start. Doubles and Mixed Doubles events will also be played during the Grand Smashes.

Dates: Fixed dates on the annual WTT Calendar

Players: 64 Men's & Women's Singles, Doubles & Mixed doubles draw

Length of event: 10 Days + Qualification

Prize Pool: Up to US$3 million

Number of events: Up to 4

Singapore Smash
| Year | Men's singles | Women's singles | Men's doubles | Women's doubles | Mixed doubles |
|---|---|---|---|---|---|
| 2022 | (China) Fan Zhendong (2) | (China) Chen Meng | (China) Fan Zhendong (2) (China) Wang Chuqin (2) | (China) Wang Manyu (2) (China) Sun Yingsha (2) | (China) Wang Chuqin (3) (China) Sun Yingsha (3) |
| 2023 | (China) Fan Zhendong (2) | (China) Sun Yingsha | (China) Fan Zhendong (2) (China) Wang Chuqin (2) | (China) Wang Manyu (2) (China) Sun Yingsha (2) | (China) Wang Chuqin (3) (China) Sun Yingsha (3) |
| 2024 | (China) Wang Chuqin | (China) Wang Manyu | (China) Ma Long (China) Lin Gaoyuan | (China) Chen Meng (China) Wang Manyu (3) | (China) Wang Chuqin (3) (China) Sun Yingsha (3) |
| 2025 | (China) Lin Shidong | (China) Sun Yingsha (2) | (China) Wang Chuqin (3) (China) Lin Shidong | (China) Wang Manyu (4) (China) Kuai Man | (China) Lin Shidong (China) Kuai Man |
| 2026 | (China) Wang Chuqin (2) | (China) Sun Yingsha (3) | (France) Félix Lebrun (France) Alexis Lebrun | (Japan) Miwa Harimoto (Japan) Hina Hayata | (Brazil) Hugo Calderano (Brazil) Bruna Takahashi |

China Smash
| Year | Men's singles | Women's singles | Men's doubles | Women's doubles | Mixed doubles |
|---|---|---|---|---|---|
| 2024 | (China) Lin Shidong | (China) Sun Yingsha | (China) Liang Jingkun (China) Wang Chuqin | (China) Qian Tianyi (China) Chen Xingtong | (China) Lin Shidong (China) Kuai Man |
| 2025 | (China) Wang Chuqin | (China) Wang Manyu (2) | (China) Wang Chuqin (2) (China) Lin Shidong | (China) Wang Manyu (2) (China) Kuai Man (2) | (China) Wang Chuqin (China) Sun Yingsha |
| 2026 | (Japan) Sora Matsushima | (China) Wang Manyu (2) | (South Korea) Lim Jong-hoon (South Korea) Oh Jun-sung | (China) Wang Manyu (2) (China) Kuai Man (2) | (South Korea) Lim Jong-hoon (South Korea) Shin Yu-bin |

United States Smash
| Year | Men's singles | Women's singles | Men's doubles | Women's doubles | Mixed doubles |
|---|---|---|---|---|---|
| 2025 | (China) Wang Chuqin | (Macau) Zhu Yuling | (South Korea) Lim Jong-hoon (South Korea) An Jae-hyun | (China) Wang Yidi (China) Kuai Man | (China) Lin Shidong (China) Kuai Man |
| 2026 | (Japan) Sora Matsushima | (China) Sun Yingsha | (China) Wen Ruibo (China) Yuan Licen | (China) Wang Manyu (China) Kuai Man (2) | (South Korea) Lim Jong-hoon (South Korea) Shin Yu-bin |

Europe Smash
| Year | Location | Men's singles | Women's singles | Men's doubles | Women's doubles | Mixed doubles |
|---|---|---|---|---|---|---|
| 2025 | Sweden | (Sweden) Truls Möregårdh | (China) Sun Yingsha | (Hong Kong) Wong Chun Ting (Hong Kong) Baldwin Chan | (China) Wang Manyu (China) Sun Yingsha | (China) Lin Shidong (2) (China) Kuai Man (2) |
| 2026 | Sweden | (France) Félix Lebrun | (China) Wang Manyu | (France) Félix Lebrun (France) Alexis Lebrun | (Japan) Miwa Harimoto (Japan) Hina Hayata | (China) Lin Shidong (2) (China) Kuai Man (2) |

Saudi Smash
| Year | Men's singles | Women's singles | Men's doubles | Women's doubles | Mixed doubles |
|---|---|---|---|---|---|
| 2024 | (China) Wang Chuqin | (China) Chen Meng | (China) Ma Long (China) Wang Chuqin | (China) Chen Meng (China) Wang Manyu | (China) Wang Chuqin (China) Sun Yingsha |

=== WTT Series ===
The WTT Series serves as the primary platform for professional table tennis players to compete at the international level. It is divided into three tiers — Cup Finals, Champion Series, and Contender Series — to provide athletes with sufficient competitive opportunities. WTT also focuses on hosting events in distinctive venues worldwide, such as theatres, bars, clubs, and stadiums, aiming to create engaging and intimate experiences that bring fans closer to the athletes.

==== WTT Finals ====
The WTT Finals are split into Men's and Women's events that will be held separately. The top 16 players of the year will qualify for this year-end event together with the best 8 pairs. Qualification will be determined by the player's performance throughout the WTT season and reflected through their Table Tennis World Ranking.

The first two editions of WTT Finals (2021 and 2022) was known as WTT Cup Finals. WTT stated that the winners of the WTT Cup Finals would win the prestigious ITTF World Cup trophies in March 2021, but the winners have been actually presented with WTT Finals specific trophies since the inaugural edition.

Players: 16 in Men's & Women's Singles, Top 8 pair in doubles

Length of event: 5 days

Prize Pool: Up to US$1.5million each

Number of events: 2

| Year | Host city | Men's singles | Women's singles | Men's doubles | Women's doubles | Mixed doubles |
|---|---|---|---|---|---|---|
| 2021 | Singapore | (China) Fan Zhendong | (China) Sun Yingsha | N/A | N/A | N/A |
| 2022 | Xinxiang, China | (China) Wang Chuqin | (China) Sun Yingsha | N/A | N/A | N/A |
| 2023 | Doha, Qatar (men); Nagoya, Japan (women) | (China) Wang Chuqin | (China) Sun Yingsha | (China) Xiang Peng (China) Yuan Licen | (China) Wang Manyu (China) Sun Yingsha | N/A |
| 2024 | Fukuoka, Japan | (China) Wang Chuqin | (China) Wang Manyu | (France) Alexis Lebrun (France) Félix Lebrun | (Japan) Honoka Hashimoto (Japan) Hitomi Sato | N/A |
| 2025 | Hong Kong, China | (Japan) Tomokazu Harimoto | (China) Wang Manyu | N/A | N/A | (South Korea) Lim Jong-hoon (South Korea) Shin Yu-bin |
| 2026 | Hong Kong, China | | | | | |

==== WTT Champions ====
The WTT Champion Series is exclusive to the top 32 men and women in the world. Four separate men's and women's event will be held with up to US$5million up for grabs. The matches will be played on one table to ensure that the best TV production and best entertainment is presented to fans.

Players: 32 Men's & Women's Singles

Length of event: 6 days

Prize Pool: Up to US$5million

Number of events: 4 men & 4 women

| Tour | Host city | Men's singles | Women's singles |
2022
| WTT Champions European Summer Series | Budapest, Hungary | (Japan) Tomokazu Harimoto | (China) Wang Manyu |
| WTT Champions Macao | Macau | (China) Wang Chuqin | (China) Sun Yingsha |
2023
| WTT Champions Xinxiang | Xinxiang, China | (China) Fan Zhendong | (China) Sun Yingsha |
| WTT Champions Macao | Macau | (China) Wang Chuqin | (China) Wang Manyu |
| WTT Champions Frankfurt | Frankfurt, Germany | (Chinese Taipei) Lin Yun-ju | (China) Wang Yidi |
2024
| WTT Champions Incheon | Incheon, South Korea | (China) Liang Jingkun | (China) Sun Yingsha |
| WTT Champions Chongqing | Chongqing, China | (China) Fan Zhendong | (China) Sun Yingsha |
| WTT Champions Macao | Macau | (China) Lin Shidong | (China) Sun Yingsha |
| WTT Champions Montpellier | Montpellier, France | (France) Félix Lebrun | (Japan) Satsuki Odo |
| WTT Champions Frankfurt | Frankfurt, Germany | (China) Lin Shidong | (China) Wang Manyu |
2025
| WTT Champions Chongqing | Chongqing, China | (China) Wang Chuqin | (China) Sun Yingsha |
| WTT Champions Incheon | Incheon, South Korea | (China) Xiang Peng | (China) Wang Yidi |
| WTT Champions Yokohama | Yokohama, Japan | (Japan) Tomokazu Harimoto | (China) Chen Xingtong |
| WTT Champions Macao | Macau | (China) Wang Chuqin | (China) Sun Yingsha |
| WTT Champions Montpellier | Montpellier, France | (Sweden) Truls Möregårdh | (China) Wang Yidi |
| WTT Champions Frankfurt | Frankfurt, Germany | (Japan) Sora Matsushima | (Japan) Hina Hayata |
2026
| WTT Champions Doha | Doha, Qatar | (Chinese Taipei) Lin Yun-ju | (Macau) Zhu Yuling |
| WTT Champions Chongqing | Chongqing, China | (France) Félix Lebrun | (Japan) Miwa Harimoto |
| WTT Champions Yokohama | Yokohama, Japan | (Japan) Tomokazu Harimoto | (Japan) Miwa Harimoto |
| WTT Champions Macao | Macau | (Sweden) Truls Möregårdh | (Japan) Miwa Harimoto |
| WTT Champions Montpellier | Montpellier, France | (South Korea) Jang Woo-jin | (China) Sun Yingsha |
| WTT Champions Frankfurt | Frankfurt, Germany | (Japan) Tomokazu Harimoto | (Japan) Hina Hayata |

==== WTT Star Contenders ====
WTT Star Contenders will consist of 6 events throughout the year featuring 48 men and 48 women. These events will serve as the platform for the next best in the world to earn ranking points to make the step up into the WTT Champions Series.

Players: 48 Men's & Women's Singles

Length of event: 6 days + Qualification

Number of events: 6

| Tour | Host city | Men's singles | Women's singles | Men's doubles | Women's doubles | Mixed doubles |
2021
| WTT Star Contender Doha I | Doha, Qatar | (Japan) Tomokazu Harimoto | (Japan) Mima Ito | (South Korea) Lee Sang-su (South Korea) Jeoung Young-sik | (South Korea) Shin Yu-bin (South Korea) Jeon Ji-hee | (Chinese Taipei) Cheng I-ching (Chinese Taipei) Lin Yun-ju |
| WTT Star Contender Doha II | Doha, Qatar | (Brazil) Hugo Calderano | (Japan) Hina Hayata | (South Korea) An Jae-hyun (South Korea) Cho Seung-min | (Japan) Miyu Nagasaki (Japan) Minami Ando | (Japan) Shunsuke Togami (Japan) Hina Hayata |
2022
| WTT Star Contender Doha | Doha, Qatar | (Croatia) Andrej Gacina | (Japan) Miyuu Kihara | (Germany) Benedikt Duda (Germany) Dang Qiu | (Japan) Miyuu Kihara (Japan) Miyu Nagasaki | (France) Emmanuel Lebesson (France) Jia Nan Yuan |
| WTT Star Contender European Summer Series | Budapest, Hungary | (China) Wang Chuqin | (China) Wang Yidi | (South Korea) Cho Dae-seong (South Korea) Lee Sang-su | (China) Sun Yingsha (China) Wang Manyu | (China) Wang Chuqin (China) Wang Manyu |
2023
| WTT Star Contender Goa | Goa, India | (China) Liang Jingkun | (China) Wang Yidi | (South Korea) An Jae-hyun (South Korea) Cho Seung-min | (Japan) Miyu Nagasaki (Japan) Miwa Harimoto | (South Korea) Jang Woo-jin (South Korea) Jeon Ji-hee |
| WTT Star Contender Bangkok | Bangkok, Thailand | (China) Lin Gaoyuan | (China) Chen Xingtong | (China) Lin Gaoyuan (China) Lin Shidong | (China) Chen Xingtong (China) Kuai Man | (China) Lin Gaoyuan (China) Chen Xingtong |
| WTT Star Contender Ljubljana | Ljubljana, Slovenia | (China) Fan Zhendong | (China) Sun Yingsha | (China) Lin Shidong (China) Xiang Peng | (China) Wang Yidi (China) Kuai Man | (China) Wang Chuqin (China) Sun Yingsha |
| WTT Star Contender Lanzhou | Lanzhou, China | (China) Wang Chuqin | (China) Sun Yingsha | (France) Alexis Lebrun (France) Félix Lebrun | (China) Chen Meng (China) Wang Manyu | (China) Lin Shidong (China) Kuai Man |
2024
| WTT Star Contender Doha | Doha, Qatar | (China) Wang Chuqin | (China) Sun Yingsha | (China) Liang Jingkun (China) Yuan Licen | (China) Chen Xingtong (China) Qian Tianyi | (China) Wang Chuqin (China) Sun Yingsha |
| WTT Star Contender Goa | Goa, India | (France) Félix Lebrun | (Chinese Taipei) Cheng I-ching | (South Korea) Lim Jong-hoon (South Korea) An Jae-hyun | (South Korea) Shin Yu-bin (South Korea) Jeon Ji-hee | (South Korea) Lim Jong-hoon (South Korea) Shin Yu-bin |
| WTT Star Contender Ljubljana | Ljubljana, Slovenia | (Brazil) Hugo Calderano | (Japan) Hina Hayata | (Sweden) Anton Källberg (Sweden) Kristian Karlsson | (Japan) Miyuu Kihara (Japan) Miyu Nagasaki | (Japan) Tomokazu Harimoto (Japan) Hina Hayata |
| WTT Star Contender Bangkok | Bangkok, Thailand | (Japan) Tomokazu Harimoto | (Japan) Mima Ito | (Japan) Tomokazu Harimoto (Japan) Sora Matsushima | (Japan) Honoka Hashimoto (Japan) Hitomi Sato | (Japan) Tomokazu Harimoto (Japan) Hina Hayata |
2025
| WTT Star Contender Doha | Doha, Qatar | (Japan) Tomokazu Harimoto | (China) Kuai Man | (China) Xu Yingbin (China) Xiang Peng | (Japan) Satsuki Odo (Japan) Sakura Yokoi | (Japan) Sora Matsushima (Japan) Miwa Harimoto |
| WTT Star Contender Chennai | Chennai, India | (South Korea) Oh Jun-sung | (Japan) Miwa Harimoto | (South Korea) Lim Jong-hoon (South Korea) An Jae-hyun | (Japan) Miwa Harimoto (Japan) Miyuu Kihara | (South Korea) Lim Jong-hoon (South Korea) Shin Yu-bin |
| WTT Star Contender Ljubljana | Ljubljana, Slovenia | (Brazil) Hugo Calderano | (Japan) Miyu Nagasaki | (South Korea) Lim Jong-hoon (South Korea) An Jae-hyun | (Japan) Miwa Harimoto (Japan) Satsuki Odo | (South Korea) Lim Jong-hoon (South Korea) Shin Yu-bin |
| WTT Star Contender Foz do Iguaçu | Foz do Iguaçu, Brazil | (Brazil) Hugo Calderano | (Japan) Miwa Harimoto | (Germany) Benedikt Duda (Germany) Dang Qiu | (Japan) Miwa Harimoto (Japan) Satsuki Odo | (Japan) Satoshi Aida (Japan) Honoka Hashimoto |
| WTT Star Contender London | London, United Kingdom | (Germany) Dang Qiu | (Japan) Miwa Harimoto | (Chinese Taipei) Kuo Guan-Hong (Chinese Taipei) Feng Yi-Hsin | (China) Shi Xunyao (China) Zhang Xiangyu | (Chinese Taipei) Lin Yun-Ju (Chinese Taipei) Cheng I-Ching |
| WTT Star Contender Muscat | Muscat, Oman | (France) Felix Lebrun | (Japan) Miyuu Kihara | (South Korea) Lim Jong-hoon (South Korea) Oh Jun-sung | (Japan) Satsuki Odo (Japan) Sakura Yokoi | (Japan) Satoshi Aida (Japan) Hitomi Sato |
2026
| WTT Star Contender Doha | Doha, Qatar | (China) Zhou Qihao | (Macau) Zhu Yuling | (South Korea) Cho Dae-seong (South Korea) Jang Woo-jin | (Japan) Satsuki Odo (Japan) Sakura Yokoi | (Hong Kong) Wong Chun-ting (Hong Kong) Doo Hoi Kem |
| WTT Star Contender Chennai | Chennai, India | (Czech Republic) Lubomír Jančařík | (Japan) Satsuki Odo | (France) Flavien Coton (France) Thibault Poret | (Japan) Sakura Yokoi (Japan) Sachi Aoki | (Romania) Eduard Ionescu (Romania) Bernadette Szőcs |
| WTT Star Contender Ljubljana | Ljubljana, Slovenia | (Japan) Shunsuke Togami | (Japan) Hina Hayata | (Japan) Shunsuke Togami (Japan) Hiroto Shinozuka | (Japan) Miwa Harimoto (Japan) Hina Hayata | (South Korea) Lim Jong-hoon (South Korea) Shin Yu-bin |
| WTT Star Contender São José dos Campos | São José dos Campos, Brazil | (Brazil) Hugo Calderano | (Japan) Hina Hayata | (Hong Kong) Wong Chun Ting (Hong Kong) Baldwin Chan | (Japan) Hina Hayata (Japan) Kaho Akae | (Japan) Shunsuke Togami (Japan) Satsuki Odo |
| WTT Star Contender Astana | Astana, Kazakhstan | (Germany) Dang Qiu | (Japan) Miyuu Kihara | (Romania) Eduard Ionescu (Romania) Darius Movileanu | (Japan) Miu Hirano (Japan) Miyuu Kihara | (China) Chen Junsong (China) Wang Yidi |
| WTT Star Contender Muscat | Muscat, Oman | | (Japan) Honoka Hashimoto | | | |

==== WTT Contenders ====
Then the final tier, the WTT Contenders, allows the rest of the professional players throughout the world rankings to develop their talents in up to 14 events per year, each one lasting for four days.

Players: Flexible playing system

Length of event: Flexible playing system

Number of events: Up to 14 events

| Tour | Host city | Men's singles | Women's singles | Men's doubles | Women's doubles | Mixed doubles |
2023
| WTT Contender Durban | Durban, South Africa | (Brazil) Hugo Calderano | (China) Qian Tianyi | (China) Chen Yuanyu (China) Lin Shidong | (China) Zhang Rui (China) Kuai Man | (China) Lin Shidong (China) Kuai Man |
| WTT Contender Doha | Doha, Qatar | (Brazil) Hugo Calderano | (China) Fan Siqi | (China) Yu Ziyang (China) Zhou Kai | (China) Zhang Rui (China) Kuai Man | (China) Lin Shidong (China) Kuai Man |
| WTT Contender Amman | Amman, Jordan | (China) Lin Shidong | (Japan) Mima Ito | (China) Liu Yebo (China) Xu Yingbin | (Chinese Taipei) Cheng I-ching (Chinese Taipei) Li Yu-jhun | (China) Lin Shidong (China) Kuai Man |
| WTT Contender Lagos | Lagos, Nigeria | (China) Zhou Qihao | (South Korea) Shin Yu-bin | (South Korea) Jang Woo-jin (South Korea) Lim Jong-hoon | (South Korea) Jeon Ji-hee (South Korea) Shin Yu-bin | (China) Xiang Peng (China) Liu Weishan |
| WTT Contender Tunis | Tunis, Tunisia | (Sweden) Anton Kallberg | (Japan) Miwa Harimoto | (South Korea) Jang Woo-jin (South Korea) Park Gang-hyeon | (India) Sutirtha Mukherjee (India) Ayhika Mukherjee | (Chinese Taipei) Lin Yun-ju (Chinese Taipei) Chen Szu-yu |
| WTT Contender Zagreb | Zagreb, Croatia | (China) Lin Gaoyuan | (Japan) Miu Hirano | (China) Lin Shidong (China) Yuan Licen | (South Korea) Jeon Ji-hee (South Korea) Shin Yu-bin | (China) Wang Chuqin (China) Sun Yingsha |
| WTT Contender Lima | Lima, Peru | (Portugal) Marcos Freitas | (South Korea) Shin Yu-bin | (Japan) Mizuki Oikawa (Japan) Sora Matsushima | (South Korea) Jeon Ji-hee (South Korea) Shin Yu-bin | (Spain) Álvaro Robles (Spain) María Xiao |
| WTT Contender Rio de Janeiro | Rio, Brazil | (Sweden) Mattias Falck | (Japan) Hina Hayata | (South Korea) An Jae-hyun (South Korea) Lim Jong-hoon | (South Korea) Jeon Ji-hee (South Korea) Shin Yu-bin | (South Korea) Lim Jong-hoon (South Korea) Shin Yu-bin |
| WTT Contender Almaty | Almaty, Kazakhstan | (Chinese Taipei) Lin Yun-ju | (China) Kuai Man | (China) Lin Shidong (China) Xu Yingbin | (China) Chen Yi (China) Kuai Man | (South Korea) Cho Dae-seong (South Korea) Joo Cheon-hui |
| WTT Contender Muscat | Muscat, Oman | (Brazil) Hugo Calderano | (Japan) Hina Hayata | (Germany) Patrick Franziska (Germany) Dimitrij Ovtcharov | (Hong Kong) Ng Wing Lam (Hong Kong) Zhu Chengzhu | (Chinese Taipei) Lin Yun-ju (Chinese Taipei) Chen Szu-yu |
| WTT Contender Antalya | Antalya, Turkey | (France) Félix Lebrun | (Japan) Hina Hayata | (South Korea) Lim Jong-hoon (South Korea) An Jae-hyun | (Thailand) Orawan Paranang (Thailand) Suthasini Sawettabut | (Japan) Tomokazu Harimoto (Japan) Hina Hayata |
| WTT Contender Taiyuan | Taiyuan, China | (China) Liang Jingkun | (China) Wang Manyu | (China) Lin Gaoyuan (China) Lin Shidong | (China) Chen Xingtong (China) Qian Tianyi | (China) Lin Shidong (China) Kuai Man |
2024
| WTT Contender Doha | Doha, Qatar | (Germany) Timo Boll | (South Korea) Jeon Ji-hee | (South Korea) Lim Jong-hoon (South Korea) Lee Sang-su | (South Korea) Jeon Ji-hee (South Korea) Shin Yu-bin | (China) Wang Chuqin (China) Sun Yingsha |
| WTT Contender Taiyuan | Taiyuan, China | (China) Liang Jingkun | (China) Chen Xingtong | (China) Ma Long (China) Lin Gaoyuan | (China) Chen Yi (China) Kuai Man | (China) Lin Shidong (China) Kuai Man |
| WTT Contender Rio de Janeiro | Rio, Brazil | (Brazil) Hugo Calderano | (Japan) Miyu Nagasaki | (South Korea) An Jae-hyun (South Korea) Oh Jun-sung | (Japan) Honoka Hashimoto (Japan) Hitomi Sato | (South Korea) Lim Jong-hoon (South Korea) Shin Yu-bin |
| WTT Contender Mendoza | Mendoza, Argentina | (Germany) Benedikt Duda | (Japan) Sakura Mori | (Argentina) Horacio Cifuentes (Argentina) Santiago Lorenzo | (Japan) Sakura Mori (Japan) Miyu Nagasaki | (Japan) Yuta Tanaka (Japan) Miyu Nagasaki |
| WTT Contender Zagreb | Zagreb, Croatia | (France) Alexis Lebrun | (Japan) Hina Hayata | (France) Alexis Lebrun (France) Simon Gauzy | (Japan) Sakura Yokoi (Japan) Satsuki Odo | (Japan) Tomokazu Harimoto (Japan) Hina Hayata |
| WTT Contender Lagos | Lagos, Nigeria | (Germany) Dimitrij Ovtcharov | (India) Sreeja Akula | (India) Harmeet Desai (India) Manav Thakkar | (India) Sreeja Akula (India) Archana Kamath | (South Korea) Lim Jong-hoon (South Korea) Shin Yu-bin |
| WTT Contender Tunis | Tunis, Tunisia | (Japan) Tomokazu Harimoto | (Japan) Miwa Harimoto | (Japan) Sora Matsushima (Japan) Tomokazu Harimoto | (Japan) Satsuki Odo (Japan) Sakura Yokoi | (Japan) Tomokazu Harimoto (Japan) Hina Hayata |
| WTT Contender Lima | Lima, Peru | (Slovenia) Darko Jorgic | (Japan) Satsuki Odo | (France) Florian Bourrassaud (France) Esteban Dorr | (Japan) Satsuki Odo (Japan) Sakura Yokoi | (Brazil) Henrique Noguti (Brazil) Giulia Takahashi |
| WTT Contender Almaty | Almaty, Kazakhstan | (China) Lin Shidong | (China) Shi Xunyao | (China) Lin Shidong (China) Xu Yinbing | (China) He Zhuojia (China) Liu Weishan | (China) Lin Shidong (China) Kuai Man |
| WTT Contender Muscat | Muscat, Oman | (China) Lin Shidong | (China) Kuai Man | (China) Yuan Licen (China) Xiang Peng | (China) Yang Yiyun (China) Zhu Sibing | (China) Lin Shidong (China) Kuai Man |
2025
| WTT Contender Muscat | Muscat, Oman | (China) Chen Yuanyu | (China) Shi Xunyao | (Japan) Tomokazu Harimoto (Japan) Sora Matsushima | (Japan) Satsuki Odo (Japan) Sakura Yokoi | (Spain) Álvaro Robles (Spain) Maria Xiao |
| WTT Contender Taiyuan | Taiyuan, China | (Japan) Sora Matsushima | (Japan) Honoka Hashimoto | (China) Xu Yingbin (China) Xiang Peng | (South Korea) Kim Na-yeong (South Korea) Ryu Han-na | (South Korea) Lim Jong-hoon (South Korea) Kim Na-yeong |
| WTT Contender Tunis | Tunis, Tunisia | (France) Félix Lebrun | (Japan) Miwa Harimoto | (Germany) Benedikt Duda (Germany) Andre Bertelsmeier | (Japan) Miwa Harimoto (Japan) Miyuu Kihara | (India) Manush Shah (India) Diya Chitale |
| WTT Contender Skopje | Skopje, North Macedonia | (Germany) Benedikt Duda | (France) Jia Nan Yuan | (South Korea) Lim Jong-hoon (South Korea) Oh Jun-sung | (South Korea) Kim Na-yeong (South Korea) Ryu Han-na | (Sweden) Kristian Karlsson (Sweden) Christina Kallberg |
| WTT Contender Zagreb | Zagreb, Croatia | (Japan) Tomokazu Harimoto | (Japan) Satsuki Odo | (Hong Kong) Wong Chun Ting (Hong Kong) Chan Baldwin | (Japan) Miwa Harimoto (Japan) Satsuki Odo | (South Korea) Lim Jong-hoon (South Korea) Shin Yu-bin |
| WTT Contender Lagos | Lagos, Nigeria | (Denmark) Anders Lind | (Japan) Honoka Hashimoto | (India) Sathiyan Gnanasekaran (India) Akash Pal | (South Korea) Kim Na-yeong (South Korea) Ryu Han-na | (France) Jules Rolland (France) Prithika Pavade |
| WTT Contender Buenos Aires | Buenos Aires, Argentina | (Brazil) Hugo Calderano | (Japan) Miwa Harimoto | (Japan) Kazuki Hamada (Japan) Hiromu Kobayashi | (Japan) Miwa Harimoto (Japan) Satsuki Odo | (Brazil) Hugo Calderano (Brazil) Bruna Takahashi |
| WTT Contender Almaty | Almaty, Kazakhstan | (Japan) Shunsuke Togami | (Japan) Honoka Hashimoto | (China) Yuan Lichen (China) Xu Yingbin | (Japan) Honoka Hashimoto (Japan) Hitomi Sato | (China) Huang Youzheng (China) Shi Xunyao |
2026
| WTT Contender Muscat | Muscat, Oman | (China) Wen Ruibo | (China) Shi Xunyao | (China) Huang Youzheng (China) Lin Shidong | (China) Qin Yuxuan (China) Zong Geman | (India) Manush Shah (India) Diya Chitale |
| WTT Contender Tunis | Tunis, Tunisia | (France) Flavien Coton | (Individual Neutral Athletes) Elizabet Abraamian | (France) Florian Bourrassaud (France) Esteban Dorr | (Individual Neutral Athletes) Elizabet Abraamian (Individual Neutral Athletes) Maria Panfilova | (Spain) Álvaro Robles (Spain) María Xiao |
| WTT Contender Taiyuan | Taiyuan, China | (China) Wen Ruibo | (Japan) Satsuki Odo | (China) Wen Ruibo (China) Li Hechen | (China) Shi Xunyao (China) Han Feier | (China) Huang Youzheng (China) Shi Xunyao |
| WTT Contender Lagos | Lagos, Nigeria | (Denmark) Anders Lind | (Japan) Satsuki Odo | (India) Manav Thakkar (India) Manush Shah | (Japan) Reina Aso (South Korea) Joo Cheon-hui | (India) Manush Shah (India) Diya Chitale |
| WTT Contender Skopje | Skopje, North Macedonia | (Slovenia) Darko Jorgić | (Japan) Satsuki Odo | (South Korea) Lim Jong-hoon (South Korea) Oh Jun-sung | (Japan) Satsuki Odo (Japan) Sakura Yokoi | (Japan) Hiromu Kobayashi (Japan) Miyuu Kihara |
| WTT Contender Zagreb | Zagreb, Croatia | (South Korea) Lim Jong-hoon | (Japan) Miwa Harimoto | (South Korea) Lim Jong-hoon (South Korea) Oh Jun-sung | (Japan) Miwa Harimoto (Japan) Satsuki Odo | (Hong Kong) Wong Chun Ting (Hong Kong) Doo Hoi Kem |
| WTT Contender Almaty | Almaty, Kazakhstan | (Japan) Shunsuke Togami | (Japan) Miu Hirano | (Russia) Lev Katsman (Russia) Maksim Grebnev | (Japan) Miu Hirano (Japan) Miyuu Kihara | (Russia) Evgeny Tikhonov (Russia) Maria Panfilova |
| WTT Contender Panagyurishte | Panagyurishte, Bulgaria | (Sweden) Elias Ranefur | (Japan) Hitomi Sato | (France) Florian Bourrassaud (France) Esteban Dorr | (Japan) Miu Hirano (Japan) Miyuu Kihara | (Spain) Álvaro Robles (Spain) María Xiao |
| WTT Contender Istanbul | Istanbul, Türkiye | (Kazakhstan) Fang Bo | (Japan) Honoka Hashimoto | (Russia) Nikita Artemenko (Russia) Maksim Grebnev | (Japan) Miyuu Kihara (Japan) Miu Hirano | (England) Connor Green (Wales) Anna Hursey |

== See also ==
- 2025 WTT Series
- 2024 WTT Series
- 2023 WTT Series
- 2022 WTT Series

== Results Links ==
- https://tt-wiki.info/wttv-ranglistenturniere/
- https://tt-wiki.info/world-tour-grand-finals/
- https://tt-wiki.info/world-tour-turniere/
- https://tt-wiki.info/grand-smashes/
- https://tt-wiki.info/wtt-cup-finals/
- https://tt-wiki.info/wtt-champions/
- https://tt-wiki.info/wtt-star-contenders/
- https://tt-wiki.info/wtt-contenders/
- https://tt-wiki.info/wtt-feeders/
