= Table tennis at the 2016 Summer Olympics – Qualification =

This article details the qualifying phase for table tennis at the 2016 Summer Olympics. The competition at these Games will comprise a total of 172 table tennis players coming from their respective NOCs; each may enter up to six athletes, two male and two female athletes in singles events and up to one men's and one women's team in team events. Host nation Brazil has automatically qualified six athletes; a team of three men and women with one each competing in the singles.

The top 22 male and top 22 female players on the International Table Tennis Federation's Olympic ranking list as of May 2016 will be qualified for the singles event at the Games. No nation can have more than two players per gender in the singles at these Games, so some players below the twenty-eighth position are given a qualifying place based on ranking.

Forty places will be awarded to the table tennis players with a maximum of two per NOC and gender through the following continental qualification tournaments between July 1, 2015 and April 24, 2016: six each from Africa and Latin America, eleven each from Asia and Europe, and three each from North America and Oceania. One invitational place per gender will be allocated by the International Table Tennis Federation (ITTF).

For the team events, the highest-ranked NOC from each continent that already contains two qualified players for the singles adds a quota place to form a team of three players and thereby secures a direct qualifying place for the Games based on the ITTF Olympic Team Ranking list. The remaining ten teams are allotted to the nine highest-ranked NOCs in any continent and to the host nation Brazil (if not qualified by any means) that have two players qualified for the singles. If less than nine nations, the next best team with a single player secures a place for the Olympics.

== Summary ==
NOC	Men		Women		Total
NOC	Singles	Team	Singles	Team	Total
Australia	2	X	2	X	6
Austria	2	X	2	X	6
Belarus	1		2		3
Brazil	2	X	2	X	6
Canada	1		1		2
China	2	X	2	X	6
Colombia			1		1
Republic of the Congo	2		1		3
Croatia	1				1
Cuba	2				2
Czech Republic	2		2		4
Denmark	1				1
Egypt	2		2	X	5
Fiji			1		1
Finland	1				1
France	2	X	2		5
Germany	2	X	2	X	6
Great Britain	2	X			3
Greece	1				1
Hong Kong	2	X	2	X	6
Hungary	1		2		3
India	2		2		4
Iran	2		1		3
Japan	2	X	2	X	6
Kazakhstan	1				1
Lebanon			1		1
Luxembourg			1		1
Mexico	1		1		2
Netherlands			2	X	3
Nigeria	2	X	2		5
North Korea			2	X	4
Paraguay	1				1
Philippines			1		1
Poland	2	X	2	X	6
Portugal	2	X	2		5
Puerto Rico	1		1		2
Qatar	1				1
Romania	2		2	X	5
Russia	1		2		3
Serbia	1				1
Singapore	2		2	X	5
Slovakia	1		2		3
Slovenia	1				1
South Korea	2	X	2	X	6
Spain	1		1		2
Sweden	2	X	2		5
Syria			1		1
Chinese Taipei	2	X	2	X	6
Thailand	1		2		3
Tunisia			1		1
Turkey	1		1		2
Ukraine	1		1		2
United States	2	X	2	X	6
Uzbekistan	1				1
Vanuatu	1				1
Venezuela			1		1
Total: 56 NOCs	70	16	70	16	172

== Events ==
†: Athlete qualified for team event only.

=== Men's singles ===
Event	Date	Venue	Places	Qualified athletes
2015 European Games	June 12–28, 2015	(Azerbaijan) Baku	1	Dimitrij Ovtcharov (GER)
2015 Pan American Games	July 10–26, 2015	(Canada) Toronto	1	Hugo Calderano (BRA)
2015 All-Africa Games	September 10–19, 2015	(Republic of the Congo) Brazzaville	4	Wang Jianan (CGO); Omar Assar (EGY); Khalid Assar (EGY); Quadri Aruna (NGR)
African Qualification Tournament	February 16–18, 2016	(Sudan) Khartoum	2	Segun Toriola (NGR); Suraju Saka (CGO)
Oceania Qualification Tournament	March 20–24, 2016	(Australia) Bendigo	3	David Powell (AUS); Chris Yan (AUS); Yoshua Shing (VAN)
Latin American Qualification Tournament	April 1–3, 2016	(Chile) Santiago	5	Andy Pereira (CUB); Jorge Campos (CUB); Marcos Madrid (MEX); Brian Afanador (PUR); Gustavo Tsuboi (BRA)
North American Qualification Tournament	April 8–10, 2016	(Canada) Toronto	3	Eugene Wang (CAN); Feng Yijun (USA); Kanak Jha (USA)
European Qualification Tournament	April 12–16, 2016	(Sweden) Halmstad	11	Panagiotis Gionis (GRE); Timo Boll (GER); Marcos Freitas (POR); Bastian Steger (GER)†; Tiago Apolónia (POR); Alexander Shibaev (RUS); Pär Gerell (SWE); Bojan Tokič (SLO); Jonathan Groth (DEN); Emmanuel Lebesson (FRA); Kou Lei (UKR)
Asian Qualification Tournament	April 13–17, 2016	Hong Kong	12	Soumyajit Ghosh (IND)^{SA} Chen Feng (SIN)^{SEA} Ma Long (CHN)^{EA} Nima Alamian (IRI)^{MA} Li Ping (QAT)^{WA} Kirill Gerassimenko (KAZ); Sharath Kamal (IND); Chen Chien-an (TPE); Ho Kwan Kit (HKG)†; Noshad Alamian (IRI); Zokhid Kenjaev (UZB); Padasak Tanviriyavechakul (THA)
ITTF World Ranking	May 5–30, 2016	—	24	Xu Xin (CHN)†; Zhang Jike (CHN); Jun Mizutani (JPN); Chuang Chih-yuan (TPE); Wong Chun Ting (HKG); Vladimir Samsonov (BLR); Tang Peng (HKG); Lee Sang-su (KOR); Maharu Yoshimura (JPN)†; Koki Niwa (JPN); Jung Young-sik (KOR); Andrej Gaćina (CRO); Stefan Fegerl (AUT); Simon Gauzy (FRA); Kristian Karlsson (SWE); Gao Ning (SIN); Ahmet Li (TUR); Robert Gardos (AUT); Wang Zengyi (POL); Wang Yang (SVK); Liam Pitchford (GBR); Jakub Dyjas (POL); Paul Drinkhall (GBR); Ovidiu Ionescu (ROU)
Tripartite Commission Invitation	May 30, 2016	—	1	Marcelo Aguirre (PAR)
Re-allocation of unused quota	May 15–30, 2016	—	7	Lubomír Jančařík (CZE); Benedek Oláh (FIN); Dmitrij Prokopcov (CZE); Ádám Pattantyús (HUN); He Zhiwen (ESP); Aleksandar Karakašević (SRB); Adrian Crișan (ROU)
Team allocation	May 30, 2016	—	12	Bode Abiodun (NGR)†; Timothy Wang (USA)†; Hu Heming (AUS)†; João Monteiro (POR)†; Joo Sae-hyuk (KOR)†; Tristan Flore (FRA)†; Mattias Karlsson (SWE)†; Daniel Habesohn (AUT)†; Daniel Górak (POL)†; Chiang Hung-chieh (TPE)†; Sam Walker (GBR)†; Cazuo Matsumoto (BRA)†
Total			86	

Legend

- ^{EA} – Winner from the East Asia zone
- ^{SEA} – Winner from the Southeast Asia zone
- ^{SA} – Winner from the South Asia zone
- ^{MA} – Winner from the Middle Asia zone
- ^{WA} – Winner from the West Asia zone

=== Men's team ===
Event	Date	Places	Qualified teams
Continental quota	May 30, 2016	6	Nigeria (Africa); China (Asia); Germany (Europe); Brazil (Latin America); United States (North America); Australia (Oceania)
Host NOC	May 30, 2016	1	—
Remaining quota	May 30, 2016	10	Japan; Hong Kong; Portugal; South Korea; France; Sweden; Austria; Poland; Chinese Taipei; Great Britain
Total		16	

NOC	Continent/Region	Qualifiers	ITTF ranking
China	Asia	2	1
Germany	Europe	2	2
Japan	Asia	2	3
Hong Kong	Asia	2	4
Portugal	Europe	2	5
South Korea	Asia	2	6
France	Europe	2	7
Sweden	Europe	2	8
Austria	Europe	2	9
Poland	Europe	2	10
Chinese Taipei	Asia	2	11
Great Britain	Europe	2	12
Singapore	Asia	2	15
India	Asia	2	17
Brazil	Latin America	2	20
Nigeria	Africa	2	27
Egypt	Africa	2	32
Iran	Asia	2	33
Republic of the Congo	Africa	2	35
Cuba	Latin America	2	38
United States	North America	2	48
Australia	Oceania	2	55

=== Women's singles ===
Event	Date	Venue	Places	Qualified athletes
2015 European Games	June 12–28, 2015	(Azerbaijan) Baku	1	Li Jiao (NED)
2015 Pan American Games	July 10–26, 2015	(Canada) Toronto	1	Jennifer Wu (USA)
2015 All-Africa Games	September 10–19, 2015	(Republic of the Congo) Brazzaville	4	Han Xing (CGO); Nadeen El-Dawlatly (EGY); Dina Meshref (EGY); Olufunke Oshonaike (NGR)
African Qualification Tournament	February 16–18, 2016	(Sudan) Khartoum	2	Offiong Edem (NGR); Safa Saidani (TUN)
Oceania Qualification Tournament	March 22–25, 2016	(Australia) Bendigo	3	Lay Jian Fang (AUS); Melissa Tapper (AUS); Sally Yee (FIJ)
Latin American Qualification Tournament	April 1–3, 2016	(Chile) Santiago	6	Adriana Diaz (PUR); Lady Ruano (COL); Caroline Kumahara (BRA); Lin Gui (BRA); Gremlis Arvelo (VEN); Yadira Silva (MEX)
North American Qualification Tournament	April 8–10, 2016	(Canada) Toronto	2	Lily Zhang (USA); Zhang Mo (CAN)
European Qualification Tournament	April 12–16, 2016	(Sweden) Halmstad	11	Han Ying (GER); Petrissa Solja (GER); Shan Xiaona (GER)†; Melek Hu (TUR); Yu Fu (POR); Li Qian (POL); Polina Mikhailova (RUS); Liu Jia (AUT); Li Jie (NED); Li Fen (SWE); Matilda Ekholm (SWE)
Asian Qualification Tournament	April 13–17, 2016	Hong Kong	11	Manika Batra (IND)^{SA} Feng Tianwei (SIN)^{SEA} Mariana Sahakian (LIB)^{WA} Neda Shahsavari (IRI)^{MA} Li Xiaoxia (CHN)^{EA} Suthasini Sawettabut (THA); Ri Myong-sun (PRK); Kim Song-i (PRK); Nanthana Komwong (THA); Mouma Das (IND); Ian Lariba (PHI)
ITTF World Ranking	May 5–30, 2016	—	23	Liu Shiwen (CHN)†; Ding Ning (CHN); Kasumi Ishikawa (JPN); Ai Fukuhara (JPN); Jeon Ji-hee (KOR); Seo Hyo-won (KOR); Cheng I-ching (TPE); Yu Mengyu (SIN); Doo Hoi Kem (HKG); Lee Ho Ching (HKG); Chen Szu-yu (TPE); Elizabeta Samara (ROU); Georgina Póta (HUN); Tetyana Bilenko (UKR); Shen Yanfei (ESP); Li Xue (FRA); Sofia Polcanova (AUT); Shao Jieni (POR); Daniela Dodean (ROU); Viktoria Pavlovich (BLR); Katarzyna Grzybowska (POL); Iveta Vacenovská (CZE); Barbora Balážová (SVK)
Tripartite Commission Invitation	May 30, 2016	—	1	Heba Allejji (SYR)
Re-allocation of unused quota	May 15–30, 2016	—	7	Ni Xialian (LUX); Maria Dolgikh (RUS); Hana Matelová (CZE); ~~Carole Grundisch (FRA)~~; Eva Ódorová (SVK); Alexandra Privalova (BLR); Petra Lovas (HUN); Galia Dvorak (ESP)
Team allocation	May 30, 2016	—	13	Yousra Abdel Razek (EGY)†; Zheng Jiaqi (USA)†; Ziyu Zhang (AUS)†; Mima Ito (JPN)†; Zhou Yihan (SIN)†; Tie Ya Na (HKG)†; Yang Ha-eun (KOR)†; Ri Mi-gyong (PRK)†; Britt Eerland (NED)†; Bernadette Szőcs (ROU)†; Natalia Partyka (POL)†; Li Qiangbing (AUT)†; Bruna Takahashi (BRA)†
Total			86	

Legend

- ^{EA} – Winner from the East Asia zone
- ^{SEA} – Winner from the Southeast Asia zone
- ^{SA} – Winner from the South Asia zone
- ^{MA} – Winner from the Middle Asia zone
- ^{WA} – Winner from the West Asia zone

=== Women's team ===
Event	Date	Places	Qualified teams
Continental quota	May 30, 2016	6	Egypt (Africa); China (Asia); Germany (Europe); Brazil (Latin America); United States (North America); Australia (Oceania)
Host NOC	May 30, 2016	1	—
Remaining quota	May 30, 2016	10	Japan; Singapore; Hong Kong; South Korea; Chinese Taipei; North Korea; Netherlands; Romania; Poland; Austria
Total		16	

NOC	Continent/Region	Qualifiers	ITTF ranking
China	Asia	2	1
Japan	Asia	2	2
Germany	Europe	2	3
Singapore	Asia	2	4
Hong Kong	Asia	2	5
South Korea	Asia	2	6
Chinese Taipei	Asia	2	7
North Korea	Asia	2	8
Netherlands	Europe	2	9
Romania	Europe	2	10
Poland	Europe	2	11
Austria	Europe	2	12
Sweden	Europe	2	13
Portugal	Europe	2	15
Thailand	Asia	2	21
United States	North America	2	26
India	Asia	2	29
Brazil	Latin America	2	30
Egypt	Africa	2	31
Australia	Oceania	2	32
Nigeria	Africa	2	39
