= 2015 World Table Tennis Championships – Men's singles =

Men's singles at the 2015 World Table Tennis Championships
- Venue: Suzhou International Expo Center
- Location: Suzhou, China
- Dates: 26 April – 3 May
- Final score: 11–7, 7–11, 11–4 ,11–8, 11–13, 11–4

Medalists
| gold medal | Ma Long | China |
| silver medal | Fang Bo | China |
| bronze medal | Fan Zhendong | China |
| bronze medal | Zhang Jike | China |

Zhang Jike was the defending champion but lost in the semifinals.

Ma Long defeated Fang Bo 11–7, 7–11, 11–4, 11–8, 11–13, 11–4 in the final to win the title.

== Seeds ==
Matches were best of 7 games in qualification and in the 128-player sized main draw.

1. (China) Ma Long (champion)
2. (China) Xu Xin (fourth round)
3. (China) Zhang Jike (semifinals)
4. (China) Fan Zhendong (semifinals)
5. (Japan) Jun Mizutani (quarterfinals)
6. (Germany) Dimitrij Ovtcharov (second round)
7. (Germany) Timo Boll (quarterfinals)
8. (Portugal) Marcos Freitas (third round)
9. (Belarus) Vladimir Samsonov (fourth round)
10. (Chinese Taipei) Chuang Chih-yuan (first round)
11. (Japan) Koki Niwa (fourth round)
12. (Hong Kong) Tang Peng (quarterfinals)
13. (China) Fang Bo (final)
14. (Singapore) Gao Ning (fourth round)
15. (South Korea) Joo Sae-hyuk (fourth round)
16. (Hong Kong) Wong Chun Ting (fourth round)
17. (Austria) Robert Gardos (second round)
18. (Portugal) Tiago Apolónia (second round)
19. (Greece) Panagiotis Gionis (third round)
20. (Japan) Yuto Muramatsu (second round)
21. (South Korea) Jung Young-sik (third round)
22. (Japan) Kenta Matsudaira (first round)
23. (Germany) Bastian Steger (second round)
24. (Chinese Taipei) Chen Chien-an (second round)
25. (Germany) Steffen Mengel (second round)
26. (South Korea) Kim Min-seok (third round)
27. (France) Simon Gauzy (second round)
28. (Portugal) João Monteiro (third round)
29. (Nigeria) Quadri Aruna (first round)
30. (France) Adrien Mattenet (first round)
31. (Egypt) Omar Assar (third round)
32. (China) Liang Jingkun (third round)
33. (India) Sharath Kamal (third round)
34. (England) Paul Drinkhall (second round)
35. (South Korea) Lee Sang-su (fourth round)
36. (Russia) Kirill Skachkov (first round)
37. (Romania) Adrian Crișan (second round)
38. (Sweden) Kristian Karlsson (second round)
39. (Japan) Masaki Yoshida (second round)
40. (Russia) Alexander Shibaev (third round)
41. (Brazil) Gustavo Tsuboi (second round)
42. (Germany) Patrick Franziska (quarterfinals)
43. (Slovenia) Bojan Tokič (first round)
44. (Poland) Daniel Górak (second round)
45. (Brazil) Hugo Calderano (second round)
46. (Hong Kong) Jiang Tianyi (third round)
47. (Italy) Mihai Bobocica (second round)
48. (England) Liam Pitchford (third round)
49. (Austria) Stefan Fegerl (third round)
50. (Sweden) Pär Gerell (first round)
51. (Russia) Alexey Liventsov (second round)
52. (Austria) Daniel Habesohn (second round)
53. (Austria) Chen Weixing (third round)
54. (North Korea) Kim Hyok-bong (first round)
55. (Spain) He Zhi Wen (first round)
56. (Chinese Taipei) Chiang Hung-chieh (second round)
57. (Poland) Wang Zengyi (second round)
58. (Russia) Grigory Vlasov (second round)
59. (Chinese Taipei) Huang Sheng-sheng (second round)
60. (Croatia) Tan Ruiwu (first round)
61. (Sweden) Jon Persson (second round)
62. (Ukraine) Kou Lei (fourth round)
63. (France) Emmanuel Lebesson (second round)
64. (Hong Kong) Ho Kwan Kit (second round)

== Draw ==
=== Key ===
- Q = Qualifier
- w/o = Walkover
- w/d = Withdraw
- r = Retired
- DQ = Disqualified

=== Finals ===
Quarterfinals
1 | (China) Ma Long | 11 | 11 | 11 | 11
12 | (Hong Kong) Tang Peng | 7 | 9 | 6 | 1
7 | (Germany) Timo Boll | 10 | 9 | 11 | 7 | 15 | 7
4 | (China) Fan Zhendong | 12 | 11 | 8 | 11 | 13 | 11
3 | (China) Zhang Jike | 11 | 11 | 10 | 11 | 11
5 | (Japan) Jun Mizutani | 4 | 6 | 12 | 5 | 9
42 | (Germany) Patrick Franziska | 5 | 9 | 11 | 5 | 5
13 | (China) Fang Bo | 11 | 11 | 8 | 11 | 11

Semifinals
1 | (China) Ma Long | 11 | 11 | 11 | 7 | 11
4 | (China) Fan Zhendong | 1 | 7 | 8 | 11 | 5
3 | (China) Zhang Jike | 5 | 7 | 11 | 9 | 10
13 | (China) Fang Bo | 11 | 11 | 5 | 11 | 12

Final
1 | (China) Ma Long | 11 | 7 | 11 | 11 | 11 | 11
13 | (China) Fang Bo | 7 | 11 | 4 | 8 | 13 | 4

=== Top half ===
==== Section 1 ====
First round
1 | (China) Ma | 11 | 11 | 11 | 12
(Iran) Alamian | 7 | 1 | 3 | 10
(Sweden) Karlsson | 9 | 7 | 15 | 6 | 11 | 6
63 | (France) Lebesson | 11 | 11 | 13 | 11 | 9 | 11 | -
58 | (Russia) Vlasov | 11 | 7 | 11 | 6 | 11 | 11
(Belgium) Nuytinck | 6 | 11 | 6 | 11 | 2 | 8
(Slovakia) Pištej | 9 | 10 | 5 | 6
19 | (Greece) Gionis | 11 | 12 | 11 | 11
18 | (Portugal) Apolónia | 7 | 11 | 11 | 11 | 11
(Argentina) Alto | 11 | 3 | 6 | 6 | 6
(Greece) Kreanga | 11 | 5 | 5 | 12 | 7 | 7
48 | (England) Pitchford | 7 | 11 | 11 | 10 | 11 | 11
52 | (Austria) Habesohn | 7 | 11 | 12 | 11 | 11
(Egypt) El-Beiali | 11 | 9 | 10 | 8 | 7
(Hungary) Lakatos | 8 | 9 | 13 | 2 | 11 | 3
15 | (South Korea) Joo | 11 | 11 | 11 | 11 | 7 | 11

Second round
1 | (China) Ma | 11 | 11 | 7 | 11 | 11
63 | (France) Lebesson | 8 | 8 | 11 | 9 | 6
58 | (Russia) Vlasov | 5 | 8 | 11 | 9 | 7
19 | (Greece) Gionis | 11 | 11 | 9 | 11 | 11
18 | (Portugal) Apolónia | 8 | 11 | 12 | 4 | 6 | 9
48 | (England) Pitchford | 11 | 8 | 10 | 11 | 11 | 11
52 | (Austria) Habesohn | 8 | 6 | 7 | 5
15 | (South Korea) Joo | 11 | 11 | 11 | 11

Third round
1 | (China) Ma | 14 | 11 | 11 | 11
19 | (Greece) Gionis | 12 | 5 | 5 | 4
48 | (England) Pitchford | 10 | 11 | 5 | 4 | 8
15 | (South Korea) Joo | 12 | 9 | 11 | 11 | 11

Fourth round
1 | (China) Ma | 11 | 11 | 11 | 10 | 11
15 | (South Korea) Joo | 4 | 3 | 9 | 12 | 6

==== Section 2 ====
First round
12 | (Hong Kong) Tang | 11 | 11 | 11 | 11
(Paraguay) Aguirre | 5 | 6 | 3 | 6
(Croatia) Kolarek | 4 | 12 | 8 | 11 | 5 | 2
47 | (Italy) Bobocica | 11 | 10 | 11 | 8 | 11 | 11
49 | (Austria) Fegerl | 13 | 11 | 11 | 11
(Latvia) Burģis | 11 | 8 | 3 | 6
(Iran) Norouzi | 11 | 3 | 6 | 8 | 8
17 | (Austria) Gardos | 6 | 11 | 11 | 11 | 11
31 | (Egypt) Assar | 11 | 11 | 8 | 8 | 11 | 11
(Singapore) Chew | 6 | 8 | 11 | 11 | 5 | 4
(Nigeria) Toriola | 8 | 7 | 1 | 11 | 11 | 11 | 6
59 | (Chinese Taipei) Huang | 11 | 11 | 11 | 9 | 7 | 6 | 11
35 | (South Korea) Lee | 11 | 11 | 11 | 11
(Uzbekistan) Kenjaev | 1 | 5 | 4 | 7
(Thailand) Tanviriyavechakul | 6 | 2 | 5 | 13 | 3
6 | (Germany) Ovtcharov | 11 | 11 | 11 | 11 | 11

Second round
12 | (Hong Kong) Tang | 12 | 11 | 11 | 11
47 | (Italy) Bobocica | 10 | 6 | 4 | 7
49 | (Austria) Fegerl | 6 | 13 | 11 | 11 | 9 | 11
17 | (Austria) Gardos | 11 | 11 | 9 | 8 | 11 | 9
31 | (Egypt) Assar | 10 | 11 | 11 | 11 | 11
59 | (Chinese Taipei) Huang | 12 | 2 | 9 | 7 | 7
35 | (South Korea) Lee | 11 | 11 | 4 | 8 | 11 | 3 | 11
6 | (Germany) Ovtcharov | 6 | 9 | 11 | 11 | 6 | 11 | 6

Third round
12 | (Hong Kong) Tang | 11 | 6 | 11 | 9 | 11 | 11
49 | (Austria) Fegerl | 7 | 11 | 7 | 11 | 8 | 6
31 | (Egypt) Assar | 2 | 9 | 11 | 9 | 6
35 | (South Korea) Lee | 11 | 11 | 8 | 11 | 11

Fourth round
12 | (Hong Kong) Tang | 1 | 11 | 11 | 14 | 11
35 | (South Korea) Lee | 11 | 7 | 8 | 12 | 9

==== Section 3 ====
First round
7 | (Germany) Boll | 11 | 11 | 11 | 11
(Spain) Machado | 7 | 7 | 5 | 3
(Poland) Dyjas | 11 | 11 | 8 | 10 | 12 | 8 | 11
55 | (Spain) He | 8 | 6 | 11 | 12 | 10 | 11 | 5
38 | (Sweden) Karlsson | 11 | 11 | 11 | 11
(Italy) Stoyanov | 7 | 8 | 5 | 7
(Italy) Rech Daldosso | 11 | 11 | 9 | 7 | 4 | 8
28 | (Portugal) Monteiro | 5 | 6 | 11 | 11 | 11 | 11
22 | (Japan) Matsudaira | 8 | 11 | 11 | 6 | 12 | 11 | 5
(Denmark) Groth | 11 | 8 | 7 | 11 | 14 | 3 | 11
(Czech Republic) Jančařík | 11 | 11 | 13 | 11
43 | (Slovenia) Tokič | 8 | 8 | 11 | 9
34 | (England) Drinkhall | 11 | 11 | 11 | 11
(Switzerland) Schmid | 1 | 4 | 1 | 1
(Israel) Ben Ari | 2 | 9 | 7 | 1
16 | (Hong Kong) Wong | 11 | 11 | 11 | 11

Second round
7 | (Germany) Boll | 11 | 7 | 6 | 11 | 11 | 15
(Poland) Dyjas | 9 | 11 | 11 | 5 | 7 | 13
38 | (Sweden) Karlsson | 5 | 4 | 7 | 5
28 | (Portugal) Monteiro | 11 | 11 | 11 | 11
(Denmark) Groth | 11 | 11 | 11 | 10 | 13 | 11
(Czech Republic) Jančařík | 13 | 7 | 9 | 12 | 11 | 4
34 | (England) Drinkhall | 10 | 11 | 8 | 9 | 6
16 | (Hong Kong) Wong | 12 | 9 | 11 | 11 | 11

Third round
7 | (Germany) Boll | 11 | 7 | 10 | 14 | 11 | 3 | 12
28 | (Portugal) Monteiro | 5 | 11 | 12 | 12 | 7 | 11 | 10
(Denmark) Groth | 8 | 7 | 6 | 7
16 | (Hong Kong) Wong | 11 | 11 | 11 | 11

Fourth round
7 | (Germany) Boll | 11 | 11 | 3 | 12 | 15
16 | (Hong Kong) Wong | 9 | 8 | 11 | 10 | 13

==== Section 4 ====
First round
11 | (Japan) Niwa | 11 | 11 | 11 | 11
(Hungary) Jakab | 4 | 2 | 8 | 7
(Serbia) Karakašević | 13 | 14 | 8 | 12 | 7 | 9 | 7
57 | (Poland) Wang | 11 | 12 | 11 | 10 | 11 | 11 | 11
46 | (Hong Kong) Jiang | 11 | 11 | 11 | 11
(Serbia) Pete | 4 | 8 | 2 | 7
(Belgium) Devos | 7 | 11 | 6 | 11 | 7
24 | (Chinese Taipei) Chen | 11 | 13 | 11 | 8 | 11
26 | (South Korea) Kim | 9 | 11 | 11 | 11 | 11
(Iran) Ni Alamian | 11 | 6 | 9 | 5 | 2
(Israel) Tauber | 11 | 7 | 11 | 7 | 14 | 5
44 | (Poland) Górak | 5 | 11 | 3 | 11 | 16 | 11
56 | (Chinese Taipei) Chiang | 11 | 11 | 9 | 11 | 11
(Australia) Powell | 3 | 9 | 11 | 6 | 5
(Romania) Cioti | 10 | 5 | 9 | 4
4 | (China) Fan | 12 | 11 | 11 | 11

Second round
11 | (Japan) Niwa | 9 | 11 | 11 | 9 | 11 | 11
57 | (Poland) Wang | 11 | 2 | 6 | 11 | 3 | 2
46 | (Hong Kong) Jiang | 11 | 11 | 11 | 12
24 | (Chinese Taipei) Chen | 5 | 7 | 7 | 10
26 | (South Korea) Kim | 11 | 11 | 11 | 11
44 | (Poland) Górak | 5 | 7 | 4 | 4
56 | (Chinese Taipei) Chiang | 5 | 4 | 5 | 11 | 7
4 | (China) Fan | 11 | 11 | 11 | 9 | 11

Third round
11 | (Japan) Niwa | 8 | 2 | 11 | 11 | 11 | 11
46 | (Hong Kong) Jiang | 11 | 11 | 7 | 3 | 6 | 3
26 | (South Korea) Kim | 7 | 9 | 10 | 12
4 | (China) Fan | 11 | 11 | 12 | 14

Fourth round
11 | (Japan) Niwa | 5 | 14 | 2 | 2 | 9
4 | (China) Fan | 11 | 12 | 11 | 11 | 11

=== Bottom half ===
==== Section 5 ====
First round
3 | (China) Zhang | 11 | 11 | 11 | 4 | 11
(Romania) Ionescu | 5 | 8 | 3 | 11 | 8
(South Korea) Seo | 7 | 8 | 11 | 11 | 9 | 11 | 11
54 | (North Korea) Kim | 11 | 11 | 9 | 8 | 11 | 7 | 6
51 | (Russia) Liventsov | 11 | 9 | 7 | 11 | 11 | 9 | 11
(Brazil) Matsumoto | 4 | 11 | 11 | 9 | 1 | 11 | 8
(Hungary) Kosiba | 11 | 3 | 11 | 7 | 8
32 | (China) Liang | 13 | 11 | 5 | 11 | 11
30 | (France) Mattenet | 1 | 11 | 7 | 8 | 11 | 9
(Portugal) Geraldo | 11 | 7 | 11 | 11 | 8 | 11
(Mexico) Madrid | 8 | 15 | 6 | 6
64 | (Hong Kong) Ho | 11 | 17 | 11 | 11
60 | (Croatia) Tan | 12 | 8 | 11 | 9 | 11 | 15 | 6
(Finland) Oláh | 14 | 11 | 2 | 11 | 8 | 13 | 11
(Serbia) Jevtović | 8 | 5 | 8 | 11 | 9
9 | (Belarus) Samsonov | 11 | 11 | 11 | 8 | 11

Second round
3 | (China) Zhang | 11 | 11 | 11 | 11
(South Korea) Seo | 3 | 7 | 5 | 4
51 | (Russia) Liventsov | 3 | 9 | 3 | 10
32 | (China) Liang | 11 | 11 | 11 | 12
(Portugal) Geraldo | 11 | 11 | 10 | 11 | 8 | 11 | 15
64 | (Hong Kong) Ho | 4 | 13 | 12 | 8 | 11 | 9 | 13
(Finland) Oláh | 10 | 1 | 5 | 11 | 4
9 | (Belarus) Samsonov | 11 | 11 | 11 | 6 | 11

Third round
3 | (China) Zhang | 11 | 7 | 11 | 11 | 11
32 | (China) Liang | 7 | 11 | 7 | 7 | 5
(Portugal) Geraldo | 5 | 6 | 10 | 8
9 | (Belarus) Samsonov | 11 | 11 | 12 | 11

Fourth round
3 | (China) Zhang | 16 | 11 | 11 | 5 | 11
9 | (Belarus) Samsonov | 14 | 8 | 6 | 11 | 3

==== Section 6 ====
First round
14 | (Singapore) Gao | 11 | 6 | 11 | 11 | 11
(Belgium) Saive | 5 | 11 | 7 | 7 | 8
(Portugal) Chen | 6 | 11 | 7 | 3 | 6
41 | (Brazil) Tsuboi | 11 | 5 | 11 | 11 | 11
53 | (Austria) Chen | 12 | 11 | 11 | 11
(Poland) Fertikowski | 10 | 8 | 4 | 3
(Brazil) Monteiro | 8 | 9 | 10 | 7
20 | (Japan) Muramatsu | 11 | 11 | 12 | 11
21 | (South Korea) Jung | 11 | 11 | 11 | 11
(France) Salifou | 7 | 3 | 9 | 5
(Spain) Robles | 8 | 7 | 10 | 8
61 | (Sweden) Persson | 11 | 11 | 12 | 11
45 | (Brazil) Calderano | 15 | 11 | 11 | 12 | 6 | 11
(Denmark) Sternberg | 13 | 8 | 8 | 14 | 11 | 7
(Belarus) Platonov | 11 | 9 | 3 | 4
5 | (Japan) Mizutani | 13 | 11 | 11 | 11

Second round
14 | (Singapore) Gao | 3 | 11 | 11 | 11 | 11
41 | (Brazil) Tsuboi | 11 | 4 | 5 | 2 | 5
53 | (Austria) Chen | 11 | 13 | 11 | 11
20 | (Japan) Muramatsu | 3 | 11 | 7 | 5
21 | (South Korea) Jung | 9 | 11 | 9 | 11 | 11 | 10 | 11
61 | (Sweden) Persson | 11 | 8 | 11 | 9 | 4 | 12 | 7
45 | (Brazil) Calderano | 3 | 11 | 11 | 10 | 12 | 7
5 | (Japan) Mizutani | 11 | 5 | 4 | 12 | 14 | 11

Third round
14 | (Singapore) Gao | 11 | 11 | 13 | 5 | 11
53 | (Austria) Chen | 6 | 9 | 11 | 11 | 4
21 | (South Korea) Jung | 11 | 11 | 6 | 4 | 12 | 9 | 11
5 | (Japan) Mizutani | 4 | 9 | 11 | 11 | 10 | 11 | 13

Fourth round
14 | (Singapore) Gao | 11 | 7 | 7 | 11 | 3 | 3
5 | (Japan) Mizutani | 8 | 11 | 11 | 8 | 11 | 11

==== Section 7 ====
First round
8 | (Portugal) Freitas | 7 | 11 | 11 | 11 | 11
(Cuba) Pereira | 11 | 1 | 9 | 9 | 9
(Slovenia) Žibrat | 7 | 11 | 6 | 8 | 11 | 3
39 | (Japan) Yoshida | 11 | 4 | 11 | 11 | 7 | 11
42 | (Germany) Franziska | 11 | 11 | 17 | 11
(Egypt) Lashin | 8 | 9 | 15 | 5
(Ukraine) Katkov | 11 | 11 | 5 | 5 | 11 | 11 | 7
25 | (Germany) Mengel | 3 | 7 | 11 | 11 | 13 | 7 | 11
23 | (Germany) Steger | 11 | 6 | 11 | 6 | 11 | 11
(Spain) Durán | 9 | 11 | 7 | 11 | 9 | 5
(Ecuador) Mino | 4 | 7 | 7 | 8
62 | (Ukraine) Kou | 11 | 11 | 11 | 11
37 | (Romania) Crișan | 11 | 13 | 13 | 11
(Greece) Papageorgiou | 9 | 11 | 11 | 6
(Hungary) Pattantyús | 6 | 11 | 11 | 11 | 7 | 10 | 11
10 | (Chinese Taipei) Chuang | 11 | 8 | 6 | 1 | 11 | 12 | 9

Second round
8 | (Portugal) Freitas | 11 | 6 | 11 | 13 | 9 | 11
39 | (Japan) Yoshida | 8 | 11 | 4 | 11 | 11 | 7
42 | (Germany) Franziska | 11 | 9 | 11 | 11 | 11
25 | (Germany) Mengel | 9 | 11 | 6 | 3 | 6
23 | (Germany) Steger | 11 | 14 | 8 | 9 | 8 | 4
62 | (Ukraine) Kou | 4 | 12 | 11 | 11 | 11 | 11
37 | (Romania) Crișan | 6 | 13 | 13 | 9 | 11 | 6
(Hungary) Pattantyús | 11 | 15 | 11 | 11 | 9 | 11

Third round
8 | (Portugal) Freitas | 11 | 7 | 10 | 11 | 6
42 | (Germany) Franziska | 13 | 11 | 12 | 5 | 11
62 | (Ukraine) Kou | 11 | 11 | 11 | 16
(Hungary) Pattantyús | 5 | 9 | 8 | 14

Fourth round
42 | (Germany) Franziska | 7 | 8 | 11 | 11 | 11 | 11
62 | (Ukraine) Kou | 11 | 11 | 8 | 6 | 9 | 8

==== Section 8 ====
First round
13 | (China) Fang | 10 | 11 | 11 | 11 | 11
(Czech Republic) Konečný | 12 | 5 | 4 | 9 | 6
(India) Gnanasekaran | 11 | 11 | 8 | 11 | 11
50 | (Sweden) Gerell | 5 | 8 | 11 | 4 | 7
33 | (India) Kamal | 12 | 12 | 12 | 11 | 5 | 11
(North Korea) Pak | 14 | 10 | 10 | 9 | 11 | 7
(Romania) Filimon | 6 | 7 | 9 | 5
27 | (France) Gauzy | 11 | 11 | 11 | 11
29 | (Nigeria) Aruna | 6 | 10 | 12 | 11 | 5
(India) Ghosh | 11 | 12 | 14 | 6 | 11
(Slovakia) Šereda | 3 | 9 | 7 | 21 | 5
40 | (Russia) Shibaev | 11 | 11 | 11 | 19 | 11
36 | (Russia) Skachkov | 10 | 11 | 10 | 12 | 11 | 8 | 9
(North Korea) Choe | 12 | 8 | 12 | 10 | 7 | 11 | 11
(Singapore) Yang | 11 | 5 | 8 | 6 | 10
2 | (China) Xu | 9 | 11 | 11 | 11 | 12

Second round
13 | (China) Fang | 9 | 11 | 11 | 11 | 11
(India) Gnanasekaran | 11 | 4 | 8 | 5 | 7
33 | (India) Kamal | 11 | 11 | 11 | 8 | 11
27 | (France) Gauzy | 4 | 5 | 7 | 11 | 8
(India) Ghosh | 7 | 12 | 11 | 10 | 9
40 | (Russia) Shibaev | 11 | 14 | 4 | 12 | 11
(North Korea) Choe | 4 | 3 | 8 | 8
2 | (China) Xu | 11 | 11 | 11 | 11

Third round
13 | (China) Fang
33 | (India) Kamal | r
40 | (Russia) Shibaev | 11 | 11 | 2 | 9 | 5 | 7
2 | (China) Xu | 5 | 8 | 11 | 11 | 11 | 11

Fourth round
13 | (China) Fang | 10 | 7 | 11 | 11 | 8 | 11 | 13
2 | (China) Xu | 12 | 11 | 8 | 2 | 11 | 9 | 11
