= 2016 European Table Tennis Championships – Men's doubles =

The men's doubles on 2016 European Table Tennis Championships were held in Budapest, Hungary from 18–22 October 2016. Venue for the competition is Tüskecsarnok.

== Results ==
=== Finals ===
Semifinals
7	Patrick Franziska (GER); Jonathan Groth (DEN)	4
4	Kristian Karlsson (SWE); Mattias Karlsson (SWE)	1
6	Jakub Dyjas (POL); Daniel Górak (POL)	4
14	Tiago Apolónia (POR); João Geraldo (POR)	2

Final
7	Patrick Franziska (GER); Jonathan Groth (DEN)	4
6	Jakub Dyjas (POL); Daniel Górak (POL)	2

=== Top half ===
First round
1	Stefan Fegerl (AUT); João Monteiro (POR)	4
Rajko Gommers (NED); Ewout Oostwouder (NED)	1
Petyo Krastev (BUL); Alexander Valuch (SVK)	2
9	Tamás Lakatos (HUN); Adam Szudi (HUN)	4
15	Alexander Shibaev (RUS); Kirill Skachkov (RUS)	3
Pavel Platonov (BLR); Vladimir Samsonov (BLR)	4
Marc Duran (ESP); Benedek Olah (FIN)	1
7	Patrick Franziska (GER); Jonathan Groth (DEN)	4
5	Robin Devos (BEL); Cedric Nuytinck (BEL)	2
Panagiotis Gionis (GRE); Wang Yang (SVK)	4
Tomasz Lewandowski (POL); Patryk Zatówka (POL)	2
12	Tristan Flore (FRA); Emmanuel Lebesson (FRA)	4
10	Tomáš Konečný (CZE); Dmitrij Prokopcov (CZE)	0
Lei Kou (UKR); Ahmet Li (TUR)	4
Jesus Cantero (ESP); Carlos Machado (ESP)	2
4	Kristian Karlsson (SWE); Mattias Karlsson (SWE)	4

Second round
1	Stefan Fegerl (AUT); João Monteiro (POR)	4
9	Tamás Lakatos (HUN); Adam Szudi (HUN)	2
Pavel Platonov (BLR); Vladimir Samsonov (BLR)	0
7	Patrick Franziska (GER); Jonathan Groth (DEN)	4
Panagiotis Gionis (GRE); Wang Yang (SVK)	4
12	Tristan Flore (FRA); Emmanuel Lebesson (FRA)	2
Kou Lei (UKR); Ahmet Li (TUR)	0
4	Kristian Karlsson (SWE); Mattias Karlsson (SWE)	4

Quarterfinals
1	Stefan Fegerl (AUT); João Monteiro (POR)	3
7	Patrick Franziska (GER); Jonathan Groth (DEN)	4
Panagiotis Gionis (GRE); Wang Yang (SVK)	2
4	Kristian Karlsson (SWE); Mattias Karlsson (SWE)	4

Semifinals
7	Patrick Franziska (GER); Jonathan Groth (DEN)	4
4	Kristian Karlsson (SWE); Mattias Karlsson (SWE)	1

=== Bottom half ===
First round
3	Alexey Liventsov (RUS); Mikhail Paikov (RUS)	4
Tomislav Kolarek (CRO); Tomislav Pucar (CRO)	2
Frane Kojić (CRO); Alvaro Robles (ESP)	0
11	Marko Jevtović (SRB); Žolt Pete (SRB)	4
13	Paul Drinkhall (ENG); Liam Pitchford (ENG)	4
Nándor Ecseki (HUN); Bence Majoros (HUN)	2
Hunor Szőcs (ROU); Samuel Walker (ENG)	1
6	Jakub Dyjas (POL); Daniel Górak (POL)	4
8	Aleksandar Karakašević (SRB); Bojan Tokić (SLO)	4
Teodor Alexandrov (BUL); Denislav Kodjabashev (BUL)	3
Yevhen Pryshchepa (UKR); Viktor Yefimov (UKR)	3
14	Tiago Apolónia (POR); João Geraldo (POR)	4
16	Benjamin Brossier (FRA); Simon Gauzy (FRA)	0
Benedikt Duda (GER); Steffen Mengel (GER)	4
Pär Gerell (SWE); Anton Kallberg (SWE)	4
2	Robert Gardos (AUT); Daniel Habesohn (AUT)	2

Second round
3	Alexey Liventsov (RUS); Mikhail Paikov (RUS)	4
11	Marko Jevtović (SRB); Žolt Pete (SRB)	2
13	Paul Drinkhall (ENG); Liam Pitchford (ENG)	2
6	Jakub Dyjas (POL); Daniel Górak (POL)	4
8	Aleksandar Karakašević (SRB); Bojan Tokić (SLO)	3
14	Tiago Apolónia (POR); João Geraldo (POR)	4
Benedikt Duda (GER); Steffen Mengel (GER)	0
Pär Gerell (SWE); Anton Kallberg (SWE)	4

Quarterfinals
3	Alexey Liventsov (RUS); Mikhail Paikov (RUS)	0
6	Jakub Dyjas (POL); Daniel Górak (POL)	4
14	Tiago Apolónia (POR); João Geraldo (POR)	4
Pär Gerell (SWE); Anton Kallberg (SWE)	0

Semifinals
6	Jakub Dyjas (POL); Daniel Górak (POL)	4
14	Tiago Apolónia (POR); João Geraldo (POR)	2
