= Zhang Jike =

Chinese table tennis player who was the 4th player to achieve a grand slam title

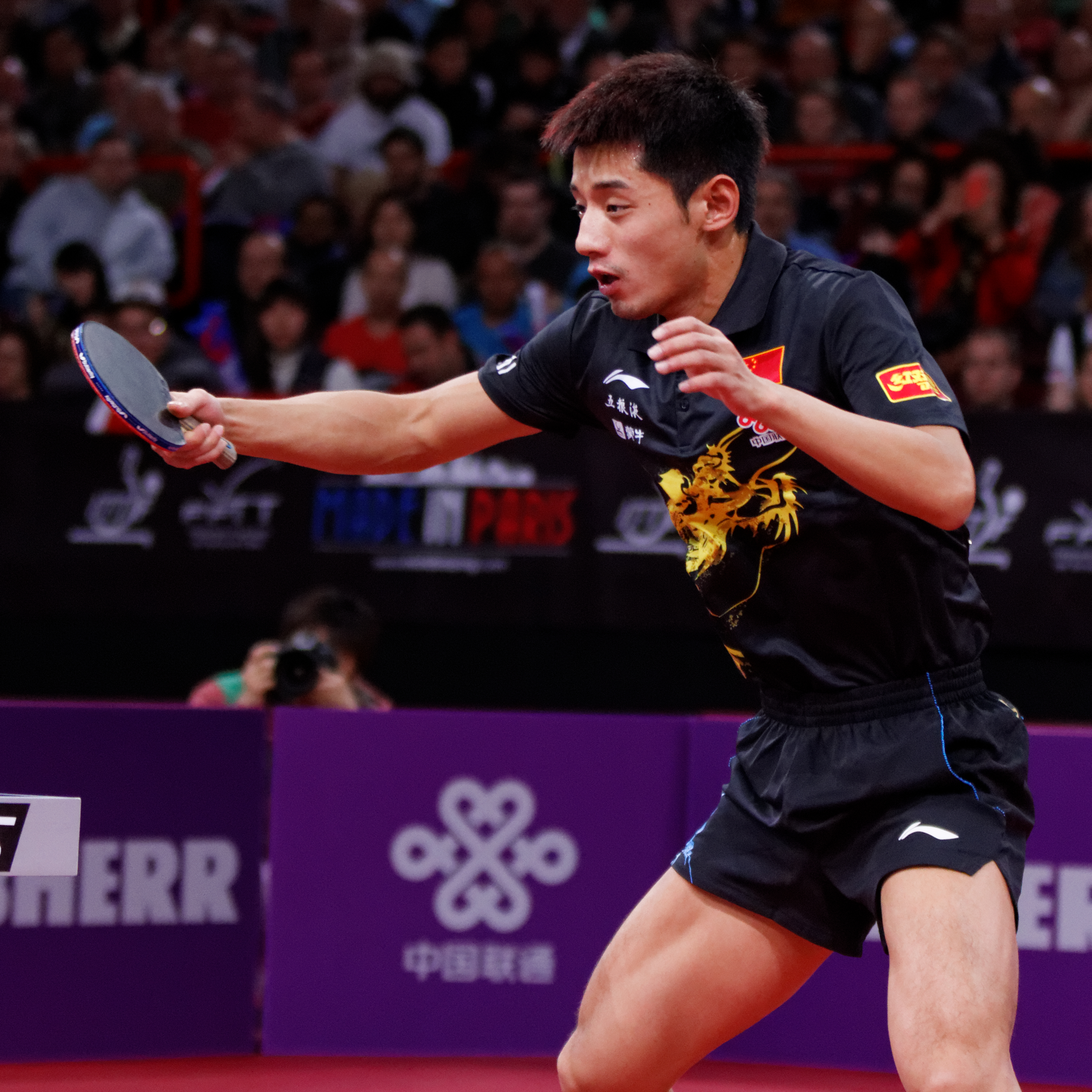
- Zhang at the 2013 World Table Tennis Championships, Paris

Personal information
- Native name: 张继科
- Nationality: Chinese
- Born: 16 February 1988 (age 38) Qingdao, Shandong, China
- Height: 1.81 m (5 ft 11 in)
- Weight: 73 kg (161 lb)

Sport
- Sport: Table tennis
- Club: Shandong Luneng
- Playing style: Right-handed, shakehand grip
- Equipment: Butterfly Viscaria FL, DHS Hurricane 3 National (FH-Black), Butterfly Tenergy 80 (BH-Red)
- Highest ranking: 1 (June to December 2012)
Medal record
Men's table tennis
Representing China
Event	1st	2nd	3rd
Olympic Games	3	1	0
World Championships	7	1	3
World Cup	6	1	0
Total	16	3	3
Olympic Games
Gold medal – first place	2012 London	Singles
Gold medal – first place	2012 London	Team
Gold medal – first place	2016 Rio de Janeiro	Team
Silver medal – second place	2016 Rio de Janeiro	Singles
World Championships
Bronze medal – third place	2009 Yokohama	Doubles
Silver medal – second place	2009 Yokohama	Mixed doubles
Gold medal – first place	2010 Moscow	Team
Gold medal – first place	2011 Rotterdam	Singles
Bronze medal – third place	2011 Rotterdam	Doubles
Gold medal – first place	2012 Dortmund	Team
Gold medal – first place	2013 Paris	Singles
Gold medal – first place	2014 Tokyo	Team
Bronze medal – third place	2015 Suzhou	Singles
Gold medal – first place	2015 Suzhou	Doubles
Gold medal – first place	2016 Kuala Lumpur	Team
World Cup
Gold medal – first place	2009 Linz	Team
Gold medal – first place	2010 Dubai	Team
Silver medal – second place	2010 Magdeburg	Singles
Gold medal – first place	2011 Paris	Singles
Gold medal – first place	2013 Guangzhou	Team
Gold medal – first place	2014 Düsseldorf	Singles
Gold medal – first place	2015 Dubai	Team
Asian Games
Gold medal – first place	2010 Guangzhou	Doubles
Gold medal – first place	2010 Guangzhou	Team
Gold medal – first place	2014 Incheon	Doubles
Gold medal – first place	2014 Incheon	Team
Asian Championships
Silver medal – second place	2009 Lucknow	Singles
Gold medal – first place	2009 Lucknow	Team
Silver medal – second place	2011 Macau	Singles
Gold medal – first place	2011 Macau	Team
Gold medal – first place	2013 Busan	Team
Gold medal – first place	2015 Pattaya	Team

Zhang Jike (Chinese: 张继科; pinyin: Zhāng Jìkē; born 16 February 1988) is a retired Chinese table tennis player.

Zhang became the fourth male player in the history of table tennis to achieve a career Grand Slam, when he won the gold medal in men's singles at the 2012 Summer Olympics in London. Zhang achieved the career Grand Slam in only 445 days, a record. He won, consecutively, first WTTC 2011, then the World Cup 2011, then the Olympic gold. He went on to win WTTC 2013 and the World Cup 2014.

== Early life ==
On February 16, 1988, Zhang was born in Qingdao, Shandong Province, to Zhang Chuanming (张传铭) and Xu Xiying (徐锡英). His father is a table-tennis coach. He was named after the Brazilian soccer player and coach Zico.

According to his father, the first time Zhang played table-tennis was on March 5, 1992, aged 4.

== Career ==
In 2011, Zhang first played in the singles event at the WTTC and won the gold medal by defeating Joo-Sae Hyuk, Wang Liqin, Timo Boll and Wang Hao, making an epic celebration by ripping his shirt after winning the final. He won the 2011 World Cup in Paris by defeating Joo-Sae Hyuk 4–0, and then Wang Hao 4–2 in the final. During the 2012 Summer Olympics in London, Zhang was 2-3 down against Vladimir Samsonov, but came back to win the match. In the semi-final, he defeated Dimitrij Ovtcharov 4–1. In the final he met his teammate Wang Hao again and won 4-1. The Chinese team also won gold in the team event, though Zhang lost to Timo Boll in the semi-final against Germany. Later that year he beat Ma Long 4–3 in final of the Slovakia Open.

Zhang had a slow start to the 2013 season, losing to Chen Chien-an at the Asian Games, but improved through the season to win the WTTC Gold Medal, beating Fan Zhendong, Robert Gardos, Gustavo Tsuboi, Patrick Baum, Xu Xin and Wang Hao. This time Zhang jumped over the barriers and ran towards his parents. The same year, he again defeated Ma Long 4–1 in the final of the Kuwait Open.

In 2014, he won the World Cup in Düsseldorf, by Boll in the semi-final and Ma in the final, 4-3.

At the 2015 WTTC, he lost to Fang Bo 1–4, but partnering with Xu Xin he won the gold medal in the doubles event. In August, he was upset by Stefan Fegerl of Austria in the men's singles semi-final of the Polish Open. He lost to Ma Long 3–4 in the final of the German Open despite having a match point in the 6th game.

In 2016, Zhang Jike defeated Ma Long easily 4–1 in the final of the Kuwait Open. During the Rio Olympics, Zhang defeated Koki Niwa in the quarter-final and Vladimir Samsonov in the semi-final. In the final he lost to his teammate Ma Long 0–4.

In 2017 at the Asian Championships Zhang defeated Yuya Oshima and Lin Gaoyuan before taking the bronze medal. At the WTTC in Düsseldorf/Germany, Zhang lost to Lee Sangsu of South-Korea 1–4. He could not play to his full potential as only the previous month he was under treatment for a hip injury. Next month in the China Open, he conceded his match versus Masaki Yoshida as he was again suffering from a hip injury. After 5 months being absent, Zhang appeared on the World Tour again. He participated in the German Open but lost to Tiago Apolonia 1–4. His world ranking dropped to 176 due to his absence from the World Tour. 6 months later he participated on the 2018 World Tour again. He first lost to Maharu Yoshimura, 3–4 in the Hong Kong Open as it was his first match after a long break from competitive play. Later that year at the China Open, he easily defeated Quadri Aruna but couldn't survive the speed of Tomokazu Harimoto. At the Japan Open, he was back in form again and defeated Lin Yun-ju, Jonathan Groth, Liang Jiangkun and Jin Ueda. But unfortunately he injured his back while playing against Harimoto in the final and lost 3–4 in a narrow match. His ranking however increased to number 71 in just one month. Two months later at the Asia-Euro Championships he defeated Bastian Steger and Jonathan Groth and proved he is still in form.

On June 1, 2018, he participated in the FIVB Tour China Open, losing 0-4 to Tomokazu Harimoto in the first round of the men's singles. On June 10, he finished second in the men's singles at the FIVB Japan Open, losing 3-4 to Tomokazu Harimoto. On August 5, he helped Team Asia beat Team Europe 7-3 in the 2018 Asia-Europe Men's Table Tennis All-Star Match and won the individual MVP award.

== Equipment and playing style ==
Zhang Jike is a Donic sponsored athlete. He uses Donic Zhang Jike New Era for his blade, a Donic J1 Red on his backhand, and Donic J1 (black) on his forehand.

Zhang Jike is a two-winged shakehand attacker, using a combination of quick topspin drive attacks, counters, and loops. He is using the harder Donic J1 for maximum drive. He stays very low to the ground and is exceptionally quick on his feet. Among all the Chinese National team players, he is known for having the best backhand technique, often using it in the forehand corner, especially when returning heavy under-spin serves and pushes. His backhand on-the-table flick is widely regarded as one of the best in the world.

When Zhang Jike initially joined the national team, the coaches were apprehensive about his forehand technique and thought about changing it completely. But Xiao Zhan, the then personal coach of Zhang Jike, noticed the explosive technique of his forehand and backhand strokes and instead retained them. Zhang Jike's spin oriented technique provides him oftentimes with a topspin advantage against opponents.

Zhang's serves are unpredictable and quite deceptive. He often employs the reverse-pendulum short serve into both corners of the table. The side-spin on the serve, together with his backhand flicks, footwork and anticipation allows him to open up topspin rallies to his advantage.

It is noticeable that he would play with a backhand oriented game plan against big forehand loopers like Ma Long or Fan Zhendong. He would keep his opponents in their backhand corner and go for down-the-line blocking winners as the opposition steps around to use a forehand loop, or just pile up pressure, resulting in bad shot selections and unforced errors by the opponent.

One of Zhang Jike's most valuable asset is his mental strength. His ability to win big points in major competitions under pressure is apparent to observers.

In 2014, Zhang's world ranking dropped to 5th as a result of consecutive early world tour exits and title drought. Head coach Liu Guoliang criticized him for his lack of focus and techniques development. However, Zhang managed to lead his hometown team, Shandong, to the 2014 Chinese Table Tennis Super League championship, and he won the World Cup again in October. His prize money, US$45,000, for winning the World Cup was taken as a fine as himself proposed for destroying the barriers in celebration. This fund will be used to set up Fair Play Award.

== Career records ==
Singles (as of May 1, 2019)

- Olympic Games: Winner (2012); Runner-up (2016).
- World Championships: Winner (2011, 13).
- World Cup: Winner (2011, 14); Runner-up (2010).
- Pro Tour Winner (6): China Open, Suzhou (2010); German Open (2011); Korean Open (2012), Slovenian Open (2012), Kuwait Open (2013).Kuwait open(2016) Runner-up (4): Qatar Open (2010); China Open, Suzhou (2011); Austrian Open (2011); Japan Open (2018)
- Pro Tour Grand Finals: Runner-up (2011); SF (2009).
- Asian Championships: Runner-up (2009, 12).
- Asian Cup: Winner (2010).

Men's doubles

- World Championships: Winner (2015).
- Pro Tour winner (6): Kuwait Open 2010; Slovenian, English, UAE, German, China (Suzhou) Open 2011.
  Runner-up (7): Kuwait, Qatar Open 2008; China (Suzhou) Open 2009; German Open 2010; Qatar, China (Shenzhen), Austrian Open 2011.
- Pro Tour Grand Finals: Winner (2011).
- Asian Games: Winner (2010, 14).

Mixed Doubles

- World Championships: Runner-up (2009).
- Asian Games: QF (2010).
- Asian Championships: Runner-up (2009).

== Personal life ==
Zhang was previously in a relationship with Chinese actress Jing Tian (景甜); they officially announced their separation in June 2019 following allegations that Zhang had shared private videos of her with creditors to whom he owed a gambling debt.
