= Table tennis at the 2016 Summer Olympics – Men's singles =

Men's singles table tennis at the Games of the XXXI Olympiad
- Venue: Riocentro
- Date: 6–11 August 2016
- Competitors: 70 from 46 nations

Medalists
1st place, gold medalist(s)		Ma Long	China
2nd place, silver medalist(s)		Zhang Jike	China
3rd place, bronze medalist(s)		Jun Mizutani	Japan

The men's singles table tennis event was part of the table tennis programme at the 2016 Summer Olympics in Rio de Janeiro. The event took place from 6 August to 11 August 2016 at Riocentro.

== Schedule ==
All times are Brasília Time (UTC−3).

Dates	Start time	Round
6 August	9:45	Preliminary round
6 August	16:00	First round
7 August	10:00	Second round
8 August	12:00	Third round
8 August	17:00	Fourth round
9 August	16:00	Quarterfinals
11 August	10:00	Semifinals
11 August	20:30	Bronze medal match
11 August	21:30	Gold medal match

== Seeds ==
Seeds were based on the ITTF World Ranking lists published in July 2016 with a maximum of 2 players per country. The top 16 seeded players qualified directly to the third round.

1. Ma Long (CHN) (champion, gold medalist)
2. Zhang Jike (CHN) (final, silver medalist)
3. Dimitrij Ovtcharov (GER) (quarterfinals)
4. Jun Mizutani (JPN) (semifinals, bronze medalist)
5. Chuang Chih-yuan (TPE) (third round)
6. Wong Chun Ting (HKG) (fourth round)
7. Vladimir Samsonov (BLR) (semifinals, fourth place)
8. Marcos Freitas (POR) (quarterfinals)
9. Jung Young-sik (KOR) (fourth round)
10. Timo Boll (GER) (fourth round)
11. Tang Peng (HKG) (third round)
12. Lee Sang-su (KOR) (third round)
13. Simon Gauzy (FRA) (third round)
14. Tiago Apolónia (POR) (third round)
15. Andrej Gaćina (CRO) (third round)
16. Stefan Fegerl (AUT) (third round)

The players seeded from 17 to 32 qualified directly to the second round.

17. Koki Niwa (JPN) (quarterfinals)
18. Alexander Shibaev (RUS) (third round)
19. Panagiotis Gionis (GRE) (third round)
20. Kristian Karlsson (SWE) (third round)
21. Li Ping (QAT) (third round)
22. Jonathan Groth (DEN) (third round)
23. Emmanuel Lebesson (FRA) (second round)
24. Pär Gerell (SWE) (second round)
25. Chen Chien-an (TPE) (third round)
26. Gao Ning (SIN) (second round)
27. Quadri Aruna (NGR) (quarterfinals)
28. Kou Lei (UKR) (fourth round)
29. Ahmet Li (TUR) (second round)
30. Wang Zengyi (POL) (second round)
31. Robert Gardos (AUT) (second round)
32. Liam Pitchford (GBR) (third round)

== Draw ==
=== Finals ===
Semifinals
1	Ma Long (CHN)	11	11	11	7	10	11
4	Jun Mizutani (JPN)	5	5	5	11	12	5
7	Vladimir Samsonov (BLR)	9	11	10	11	9
2	Zhang Jike (CHN)	11	13	12	6	11

Gold medal match
1	Ma Long (CHN)	14	11	11	11
2	Zhang Jike (CHN)	12	5	4	4
Bronze medal match
4	Jun Mizutani (JPN)	11	11	6	14	11
7	Vladimir Samsonov (BLR)	4	9	11	12	8

=== Top half ===
==== Section 1 ====
Second round
22	Groth (DEN)	11	11	12	11
42	Oláh (FIN)	8	5	10	3
63	Kenjaev (UZB)	3	10	11	7	4
32	Pitchford (GBR)	11	12	8	11	11
18	Shibaev (RUS)	11	11	11	11
34	Dyjas (POL)	9	8	8	9
33	Wang Y (SVK)	7	11	7	9	6
27	Aruna (NGR)	11	7	11	11	11

Third round
1	Ma L (CHN)	11	11	11	11
22	Groth (DEN)	2	3	3	9
32	Pitchford (GBR)	11	8	11	5	5
9	Jung Y-s (KOR)	6	11	13	11	11
10	Boll (GER)	12	11	7	11	10	12	11
18	Shibaev (RUS)	14	4	11	7	12	10	6
27	Aruna (NGR)	11	12	11	11
5	Chuang C-y (TPE)	6	10	6	7

Fourth round
1	Ma L (CHN)	6	10	11	11	13	13
9	Jung Y-s (KOR)	11	12	5	1	11	11
10	Boll (GER)	10	10	5	11	11	9
27	Aruna (NGR)	12	12	11	3	5	11

Quarterfinals
1	Ma L (CHN)	11	11	11	11
27	Aruna (NGR)	4	2	6	7

==== Section 2 ====
Second round
31	Gardos (AUT)	9	11	10	14	7
46	Ionescu (ROU)	11	5	12	16	11
37	O Assar (EGY)	5	11	11	11	11	10	8
28	Kou (UKR)	11	9	13	9	7	12	11
24	Gerell (SWE)	11	9	7	11	11
36	Calderano (BRA)	13	11	11	9	13
57	Tanviriyavechakul (THA)	7	2	5	6
19	Gionis (GRE)	11	11	11	11

Third round
8	Freitas (POR)	11	1	11	11	11
46	Ionescu (ROU)	9	11	5	7	9
28	Kou (UKR)	11	6	16	11	11
13	Gauzy (FRA)	6	11	14	9	6
11	Tang P (HKG)	11	12	7	11	10	7
36	Calderano (BRA)	8	14	11	4	12	11
19	Gionis (GRE)	9	12	5	8	6
4	Mizutani (JPN)	11	10	11	11	11

Fourth round
8	Freitas (POR)	11	11	11	11
28	Kou (UKR)	8	7	5	7
36	Calderano (BRA)	5	6	13	11	8	10
4	Mizutani (JPN)	11	11	11	8	11	12

Quarterfinals
8	Freitas (POR)	4	11	3	8	12	2
4	Mizutani (JPN)	11	9	11	11	10	11

=== Bottom half ===
==== Section 3 ====
Second round
21	Li Ping (QAT)	13	11	13	11
48	Pattantyús (HUN)	11	3	11	3
35	Tokič (SLO)	9	11	11	9	11	11
30	Wang Zy (POL)	11	9	6	11	5	3
26	Gao (SIN)	7	6	11	3	11	11	8
38	Drinkhall (GBR)	11	11	3	11	9	9	11
70	Wang J (CGO)	6	11	3	5	6
20	Karlsson (SWE)	11	8	11	11	11

Third round
3	Ovtcharov (GER)	8	11	11	7	11	9	11
21	Li Ping (QAT)	11	4	9	11	5	11	9
35	Tokič (SLO)	11	10	11	11	11
14	Apolónia (POR)	6	12	6	7	8
15	Gaćina (CRO)	11	10	9	8	11	8
38	Drinkhall (GBR)	8	12	11	11	5	11
20	Karlsson (SWE)	11	7	11	5	7	8
7	Samsonov (BLR)	9	11	8	11	11	11

Fourth round
3	Ovtcharov (GER)	31	12	11	11	11
35	Tokič (SLO)	33	10	4	5	7
38	Drinkhall (GBR)	9	6	8	17	11	8
7	Samsonov (BLR)	11	11	11	15	7	11

Quarterfinals
3	Ovtcharov (GER)	11	7	17	11	2	12
7	Samsonov (BLR)	8	11	19	4	11	14

==== Section 4 ====
Second round
29	Li (TUR)	7	9	7	4
41	Wang (CAN)	11	11	11	11
54	Toriola (NGR)	11	5	7	11	6	1
17	Niwa (JPN)	9	11	11	4	11	11
23	Lebesson (FRA)	4	11	8	11	11	9	10
50	Crișan (ROU)	11	4	11	9	7	11	12
45	He Zw (ESP)	3	9	11	8	11	9
25	Chen C-a (TPE)	11	11	9	11	8	11

Third round
6	Wong C T (HKG)	11	11	11	11
41	Wang (CAN)	9	8	5	9
17	Niwa (JPN)	11	11	11	4	11
16	Fegerl (AUT)	7	8	9	11	5
12	Lee S-s (KOR)	11	11	11	12	10	6	11
50	Crișan (ROU)	9	13	5	10	12	11	13
25	Chen C-a (TPE)	5	11	10	7
2	Zhang J (CHN)	11	13	12	11

Fourth round
6	Wong C T (HKG)	11	6	11	11	10	4	8
17	Niwa (JPN)	6	11	8	5	12	11	11
50	Crișan (ROU)	8	9	12	5
2	Zhang J (CHN)	11	11	14	11

Quarterfinals
17	Niwa (JPN)	11	4	7	7	4
2	Zhang J (CHN)	5	11	11	11	11

== Preliminary rounds ==
=== Top half ===
==== Section 1 ====
Preliminary round
62	Aguirre (PAR)	13	11	14	11
66	Powell (AUS)	11	7	12	9
55	Madrid (MEX)	11	11	11	11
69	Shing (VAN)	8	9	4	1

First round
42	Oláh (FIN)	11	11	7	11	11
53	Chen F (SIN)	4	8	11	9	6
43	Jančařík (CZE)	11	2	11	6	11	9
63	Kenjaev (UZB)	8	11	13	11	8	11
34	Dyjas (POL)	11	11	11	11
62	Aguirre (PAR)	5	9	9	7
33	Wang Y (SVK)	11	11	11	5	11
55	Madrid (MEX)	8	8	6	11	6

==== Section 2 ====
Preliminary round
52	Ni Alamian (IRI)	11	7	11	11	12
65	Jha (USA)	3	11	7	9	10
59	Afanador (PUR)	8	12	11	9	11	11	11
67	Saka (CGO)	11	10	9	11	13	9	7

First round
46	Ionescu (ROU)	11	11	11	9	11
52	Ni Alamian (IRI)	7	6	9	11	4
37	O Assar (EGY)	7	9	13	11	11	11
59	Afanador (PUR)	11	11	11	9	9	4
36	Calderano (BRA)	11	11	11	11
58	Pereira (CUB)	6	7	7	4
39	Ghosh (IND)	8	6	14	6	11
57	Tanviriyavechakul (THA)	11	11	12	11	13

=== Bottom half ===
==== Section 3 ====
Preliminary round
49	Karakašević (SRB)	11	10	11	11	10	11
68	Yan (AUS)	8	12	8	9	12	3
60	K Assar (EGY)	9	11	9	13	4	11	3
70	Wang J (CGO)	11	9	11	11	11	8	11

First round
48	Pattantyús (HUN)	11	11	7	11	11
56	Gerassimenko (KAZ)	9	9	11	7	9
35	Tokič (SLO)	11	7	11	11	11
51	No Alamian (IRI)	8	11	4	5	9
38	Drinkhall (GBR)	10	12	11	11	11
49	Karakašević (SRB)	12	10	8	8	5
40	Tsuboi (BRA)	7	9	4	11
70	Wang J (CGO)	11	11	11	13

==== Section 4 ====
First round
41	Wang (CAN)	6	13	9	11	11	11
61	Campos (CUB)	11	11	11	4	5	6
47	Prokopcov (CZE)	11	6	8	11	8	8
54	Toriola (NGR)	8	11	11	9	11	11
44	Kamal (IND)	8	12	11	6	8
50	Crișan (ROU)	11	14	9	11	11
45	He Zw (ESP)	11	7	11	8	11	11
64	Feng Yj (USA)	6	11	7	11	9	4
