= 2020 European Table Tennis Championships =

- Date: 22–27 June 2021
- Edition: 39th
- Location: Warsaw, Poland
- Venue: Arena COS Torwar
- European Table Tennis Championships

The 2020 European Table Tennis Championships were held in Warsaw, Poland, from 22 to 27 June 2021.

The championships were originally scheduled to be held from 15 to 20 September 2020, but were postponed because to the COVID-19 pandemic in Poland.

== Medal summary ==
=== Medallists ===
Event	Gold	Silver	Bronze
Men's singles	Timo Boll (GER)	Dimitrij Ovtcharov (GER)	Mattias Falck (SWE) Marcos Freitas (POR)
Women's singles	Petrissa Solja (GER)	Shan Xiaona (GER)	Margaryta Pesotska (UKR) Elizabeta Samara (ROU)
Men's doubles	Lev Katsman (RUS); Maksim Grebnev (RUS)	Jakub Dyjas (POL); Cédric Nuytinck (BEL)	Ádám Szudi (HUN); Nándor Ecseki (HUN) Tiago Apolónia (POR); João Monteiro (POR)
Women's doubles	Petrissa Solja (GER); Shan Xiaona (GER)	Nina Mittelham (GER); Sabine Winter (GER)	Stéphanie Loeuillette (FRA); Jia Nan Yuan (FRA) Hanna Haponova (UKR); Tetyana Bilenko (UKR)
Mixed doubles	Dang Qiu (GER); Nina Mittelham (GER)	Ľubomír Pištej (SVK); Barbora Balážová (SVK)	Simon Gauzy (FRA); Prithika Pavade (FRA) Emmanuel Lebesson (FRA); Jia Nan Yuan (FRA)

=== Medal table ===
* Host nation (Poland)

Rank	nation	Gold	Silver	Bronze	Total
1	Germany (GER)	4	3	0	7
2	Russia (RUS)	1	0	0	1
3	Slovakia (SVK)	0	1	0	1
4	Belgium (BEL)	0	0.5	0	0.5
4	Poland (POL)*	0	0.5	0	0.5
6	France (FRA)	0	0	3	3
7	Portugal (POR)	0	0	2	2
7	Ukraine (UKR)	0	0	2	2
9	Hungary (HUN)	0	0	1	1
9	Romania (ROU)	0	0	1	1
9	Sweden (SWE)	0	0	1	1
Totals (11 entries)		5	5	10	20
