= Table tennis at the 2016 Summer Olympics – Men's team =

Men's team table tennis at the Games of the XXXI Olympiad
- Venue: Riocentro – Pavilion 3
- Date: 12–17 August 2016
- Competitors: 48 from 16 nations
- Teams: 16

Medalists
| 1st place, gold medalist(s) | | Ma Long; Xu Xin; Zhang Jike | China |
| 2nd place, silver medalist(s) | | Koki Niwa; Jun Mizutani; Maharu Yoshimura | Japan |
| 3rd place, bronze medalist(s) | | Timo Boll; Dimitrij Ovtcharov; Bastian Steger | Germany |

The men's team table tennis event was part of the table tennis programme at the 2016 Summer Olympics in Rio de Janeiro. The event took place from Friday 12 August to Wednesday 17 August 2016 at Riocentro.

The medals were presented by Yu Zaiqing, IOC Vice President and Melecio Rivera, Executive Vice President of the ITTF.

== Format ==
Teams were made up of three players. Each team match was made up of five individual matches and ended when either side had won three matches.

Order of a team match
| | | ABC team | | XYZ team |
|---|---|---|---|---|
| 1 | Singles | A | | X |
| 2 | Singles | B | | Y |
Choose doubles pair. 5 minutes break.
| 3 | Doubles | C + either A or B | vs | Z + either X or Y |
5 minutes break
| 4 | Singles | A or B (non-playing doubles) | | Z |
| 5 | Singles | C | | X or Y (non-playing doubles) |

== Schedule ==
All times are Brasília Time (UTC−3).

| Dates | Start time | Round |
|---|---|---|
| 12 August | 19:30 | First round |
| 13 August | 15:00 | First round |
| 14 August | 10:00 | Quarterfinals |
| 15 August | 15:00 | Semifinals |
| 17 August | 11:00 | Bronze medal match |
| 17 August | 19:30 | Gold medal match |

== Seeds ==
Team ranking was based on the individual ITTF rating points of 30 July 2016 but was taken into consideration only the players qualified from each team.

| Rank | Team | Athletes (world ranking on 30 July) | | |
|---|---|---|---|---|
| 1 | China | Ma Long (1) | Xu Xin (3) | Zhang Jike (4) |
| 2 | Germany | Dimitrij Ovtcharov (5) | Timo Boll (13) | Bastian Steger (24) |
| 3 | South Korea | Jung Young-sik (12) | Joo Sae-hyuk (14) | Lee Sang-su (16) |
| 4 | Japan | Jun Mizutani (6) | Maharu Yoshimura (21) | Koki Niwa (22) |
| 5 | Hong Kong | Wong Chun Ting (8) | Tang Peng (15) | Ho Kwan Kit (41) |
| 6 | Portugal | Marcos Freitas (11) | Tiago Apolónia (18) | João Monteiro (35) |
| 7 | France | Simon Gauzy (17) | Emmanuel Lebesson (30) | Tristan Flore (66) |
| 8 | Sweden | Kristian Karlsson (27) | Pär Gerell (32) | Mattias Karlsson (37) |
| 9 | Chinese Taipei | Chuang Chih-yuan (7) | Chen Chien-an (33) | Chiang Hung-chieh (75) |
| 10 | Austria | Stefan Fegerl (20) | Robert Gardos (48) | Daniel Habesohn (89) |
| 11 | Great Britain | Liam Pitchford (48) | Paul Drinkhall (58) | Sam Walker (131) |
| 12 | Poland | Wang Zengyi (46) | Jakub Dyjas (52) | Daniel Górak (62) |
| 13 | Brazil | Hugo Calderano (54) | Gustavo Tsuboi (68) | Cazuo Matsumoto (79) |
| 14 | Nigeria | Quadri Aruna (40) | Segun Toriola (120) | Bode Abiodun (180) |
| 15 | United States | Feng Yijun (271) | Kanak Jha (275) | Timothy Wang (291) |
| 16 | Australia | David Powell (278) | Chris Yan (350) | Hu Heming (366) |

== Bracket ==
First round
1 | China | 3
14 | Nigeria | 0
11 | Great Britain | 3
7 | France | 2
8 | Sweden | 3
15 | United States | 0
13 | Brazil | 0
3 | South Korea | 3
4 | Japan | 3
12 | Poland | 2
16 | Australia | 0
5 | Hong Kong | 3
6 | Portugal | 1
10 | Austria | 3
9 | Chinese Taipei | 1
2 | Germany | 3

Quarterfinals
1 | China | 3
11 | Great Britain | 0
8 | Sweden | 1
3 | South Korea | 3
4 | Japan | 3
5 | Hong Kong | 1
10 | Austria | 1
2 | Germany | 3

Semifinals
1 | China | 3
3 | South Korea | 0
4 | Japan | 3
2 | Germany | 1

Gold medal match
1 | China | 3
4 | Japan | 1
Bronze medal match
3 | South Korea | 1
2 | Germany | 3

== Results ==
=== First round ===
| 12 August 2016; 19:30 | China | 3–0 | Nigeria | Duration: 1h 12min |

| | Individual matches |
| Xu Xin | 3–0 | Segun Toriola | 11–1, 11–9, 11–6 |
| Ma Long | 3–1 | Quadri Aruna | 11–6, 11–3, 5–11, 11–2 |
| Zhang Jike / Xu Xin | 3–0 | Bode Abiodun / Segun Toriola | 11–5, 11–6, 11–5 |

| 12 August 2016; 19:30 | Great Britain | 3–2 | France | Duration: 3h 44min |

| | Individual matches |
| Liam Pitchford | 2–3 | Simon Gauzy | 10–12, 11–7, 12–14, 11–8, 5–11 |
| Paul Drinkhall | 3–2 | Emmanuel Lebesson | 11–4, 8–11, 8–11, 11–7, 11–6 |
| Sam Walker / Paul Drinkhall | 2–3 | Tristan Flore / Emmanuel Lebesson | 11–6, 11–6, 9–11, 8–11, 6–11 |
| Liam Pitchford | 3–2 | Tristan Flore | 10–12, 2–11, 11–6, 12–10, 11–9 |
| Sam Walker | 3–2 | Simon Gauzy | 7–11, 11–8, 13–11, 9–11, 12–10 |

| 12 August 2016; 19:30 | Sweden | 3–0 | United States | Duration: 1h 21min |

| | Individual matches |
| Pär Gerell | 3–0 | Feng Yijun | 11–3, 11–6, 12–10 |
| Kristian Karlsson | 3–0 | Kanak Jha | 11–6, 11–6, 11–5 |
| Mattias Karlsson / Pär Gerell | 3–0 | Timothy Wang / Kanak Jha | 11–5, 11–9, 11–8 |

| 12 August 2016; 19:30 | Brazil | 0–3 | South Korea | Duration: 1h 40min |

| | Individual matches |
| Hugo Calderano | 0–3 | Joo Sae-hyuk | 13–15, 3–11, 6–11 |
| Cazuo Matsumoto | 1–3 | Jung Young-sik | 8–11, 11–6, 8–11, 2–11 |
| Gustavo Tsuboi / Hugo Calderano | 0–3 | Lee Sang-su / Jung Young-sik | 5–11, 7–11, 2–11 |

| 13 August 2016; 15:00 | Japan | 3–2 | Poland | Duration: 3h 32min |

| | Individual matches |
| Maharu Yoshimura | 3–1 | Wang Zengyi | 10–12, 11–5, 17–15, 16–14 |
| Jun Mizutani | 3–1 | Jakub Dyjas | 12–10, 11–9, 9–11, 12–10 |
| Koki Niwa / Maharu Yoshimura | 2–3 | Daniel Górak / Wang Zengyi | 11–7, 9–11, 7–11, 11–6, 9–11 |
| Koki Niwa | 1–3 | Jakub Dyjas | 8–11, 11–7, 11–13, 8–11 |
| Jun Mizutani | 3–1 | Daniel Górak | 11–9, 11–4, 8–11, 11–9 |

| 13 August 2016; 15:00 | Australia | 0–3 | Hong Kong | Duration: 57min |

| | Individual matches |
| David Powell | 0–3 | Tang Peng | 7–11, 8–11, 1–11 |
| Chris Yan | 0–3 | Wong Chun Ting | 7–11, 6–11, 2–11 |
| Hu Heming / Chris Yan | 0–3 | Ho Kwan Kit / Wong Chun Ting | 2–11, 5–11, 6–11 |

| 13 August 2016; 15:00 | Portugal | 1–3 | Austria | Duration: 3h 14min |

| | Individual matches |
| Tiago Apolónia | 2–3 | Robert Gardos | 6–11, 11–3, 3–11, 11–6, 9–11 |
| Marcos Freitas | 3–2 | Stefan Fegerl | 11–7, 12–10, 6–11, 7–11, 11–2 |
| João Monteiro / Tiago Apolónia | 2–3 | Daniel Habesohn / Robert Gardos | 11–6, 8–11, 9–11, 11–6, 10–12 |
| João Monteiro | 1–3 | Stefan Fegerl | 11–9, 8–11, 8–11, 9–11 |

| 13 August 2016; 15:00 | Chinese Taipei | 1–3 | Germany | Duration: 2h 59min |

| | Individual matches |
| Chen Chien-an | 2–3 | Timo Boll | 8–11, 12–10, 13–11, 5–11, 6–11 |
| Chuang Chih-yuan | 1–3 | Dimitrij Ovtcharov | 9–11, 11–7, 7–11, 7–11 |
| Chiang Hung-chieh / Chen Chien-an | 3–2 | Bastian Steger / Timo Boll | 9–11, 9–11, 14–12, 12–10, 11–7 |
| Chuang Chih-yuan | 0–3 | Bastian Steger | 8–11, 9–11, 7–11 |

=== Quarterfinals ===
| 14 August 2016; 10:00 | China | 3–0 | Great Britain | Duration: 1h 47min |

| | Individual matches |
| Ma Long | 3–1 | Liam Pitchford | 6–11, 11–4, 11–9, 11–9 |
| Xu Xin | 3–1 | Paul Drinkhall | 9–11, 11–6, 11–6, 11–7 |
| Zhang Jike / Xu Xin | 3–1 | Sam Walker / Paul Drinkhall | 11–4, 11–7, 11–13, 11–4 |

| 14 August 2016; 10:00 | Sweden | 1–3 | South Korea | Duration: 2h 45min |

| | Individual matches |
| Kristian Karlsson | 1–3 | Joo Sae-hyuk | 5–11, 6–11, 11–9, 6–11 |
| Mattias Karlsson | 3–2 | Lee Sang-su | 11–9, 8–11, 11–6, 8–11, 12–10 |
| Pär Gerell / Mattias Karlsson | 0–3 | Jung Young-sik / Lee Sang-su | 2–11, 4–11, 7–11 |
| Kristian Karlsson | 1–3 | Jung Young-sik | 4–11, 11–8, 3–11, 7–11 |

| 14 August 2016; 15:00 | Japan | 3–1 | Hong Kong | Duration: 2h 49min |

| | Individual matches |
| Koki Niwa | 2–3 | Tang Peng | 11–8, 12–10, 9–11, 7–11, 8–11 |
| Jun Mizutani | 3–2 | Wong Chun Ting | 11–5, 11–9, 3–11, 10–12, 11–8 |
| Maharu Yoshimura / Koki Niwa | 3–1 | Ho Kwan Kit / Tang Peng | 11–5, 8–11, 11–8, 11–4 |
| Maharu Yoshimura | 3–1 | Wong Chun Ting | 11–8, 13-11, 5-11, 11–6 |

| 14 August 2016; 15:00 | Austria | 1–3 | Germany | Duration: 2h 34min |

| | Individual matches |
| Robert Gardos | 0–3 | Timo Boll | 12–14, 8–11, 10–12 |
| Stefan Fegerl | 0–3 | Dimitrij Ovtcharov | 7–11, 10–12, 8–11 |
| Daniel Habesohn / Robert Gardos | 3–2 | Bastian Steger / Timo Boll | 11–7, 2–11, 11–8, 6–11, 11–3 |
| Stefan Fegerl | 0–3 | Bastian Steger | 8–11, 11–13, 7–11 |

=== Semifinals ===
| 15 August 2016; 15:00 | Japan | 3–1 | Germany | Duration: 2h 18min |

| | Individual matches |
| Maharu Yoshimura | 0–3 | Dimitrij Ovtcharov | 8–11, 3–11, 3–11 |
| Jun Mizutani | 3–0 | Timo Boll | 11–9, 11–5, 12–10 |
| Koki Niwa / Maharu Yoshimura | 3–1 | Bastian Steger / Timo Boll | 11–5, 13–15, 11–4, 11–5 |
| Jun Mizutani | 3–0 | Bastian Steger | 11–5, 11–4, 11–4 |

| 15 August 2016; 19:30 | China | 3–0 | South Korea | Duration: 2h 4min |

| | Individual matches |
| Zhang Jike | 3–2 | Jung Young-sik | 13–15, 13–11, 9–11, 11–8, 11–4 |
| Ma Long | 3–0 | Joo Sae-hyuk | 11–1, 11–4, 11–4 |
| Xu Xin / Zhang Jike | 3–0 | Lee Sang-su / Jung Young-sik | 11–8, 12–10, 11–6 |

=== Bronze medal match ===
| 17 August 2016; 11:00 | South Korea | 1–3 | Germany | Duration: 3h 43min |

| | Individual matches |
| Jung Young-sik | 3–2 | Bastian Steger | 12–10, 6–11, 11–6, 6–11, 13–11 |
| Joo Sae-hyuk | 2–3 | Dimitrij Ovtcharov | 5–11, 9–11, 11–8, 11–2, 6–11 |
| Lee Sang-su / Jung Young-sik | 2–3 | Timo Boll / Bastian Steger | 11–9, 6–11, 7–11, 11–9, 9–11 |
| Joo Sae-hyuk | 0–3 | Timo Boll | 8-11, 9-11, 6-11 |

=== Gold medal match ===
| 17 August 2016; 19:30 | China | 3–1 | Japan | Duration: 2h 40min |

| | Individual matches |
| Ma Long | 3–0 | Koki Niwa | 11–6, 11–9, 11–6 |
| Xu Xin | 2–3 | Jun Mizutani | 10–12, 9–11, 11–3, 11–7, 10–12 |
| Xu Xin / Zhang Jike | 3–1 | Koki Niwa / Maharu Yoshimura | 4–11, 11–6, 11–9, 11–5 |
| Ma Long | 3–0 | Maharu Yoshimura | 11–1, 11–4, 11–4 |
