= 2019 European Table Tennis Championships =

- Date: 3–8 September 2019
- Location: Nantes, France
- Venue: Salle Sportive Métropolitaine
- European Table Tennis Championships

The 2019 European Table Tennis Championships were held in Nantes, France from 3–8 September 2019. The venue for the competition was Salle Sportive Métropolitaine. The competition featured team events for men and women, with the winning teams qualifying for the 2019 ITTF Team World Cup.

== Schedule ==
Two team events were contested.

Group phase
Rounds in Main Draw
Finals

Date	3 September	4 September	5 September	6 September	7 September	8 September
Men's team	GS	GS	GS	QF	SF	F
Women's team	GS	GS	GS	QF	SF	F

== Medalists ==
Event	Gold	Silver	Bronze
Men's team	Germany; Timo Boll; Dimitrij Ovtcharov; Patrick Franziska; Benedikt Duda; Ruwen Filus	Portugal; Tiago Apolónia; Marcos Freitas; João Monteiro; Diogo Carvalho; Diogo Chen	France; Simon Gauzy; Emmanuel Lebesson; Can Akkuzu; Tristan Flore; Andrea Landrieu
Men's team	Germany; Timo Boll; Dimitrij Ovtcharov; Patrick Franziska; Benedikt Duda; Ruwen Filus	Portugal; Tiago Apolónia; Marcos Freitas; João Monteiro; Diogo Carvalho; Diogo Chen	Sweden; Mattias Falck; Kristian Karlsson; Jon Persson; Truls Möregårdh; Anton Källberg
Women's team	Romania; Bernadette Szőcs; Elizabeta Samara; Daniela Dodean; Irina Ciobanu; Adina Diaconu	Portugal; Fu Yu; Shao Jieni; Leila Oliveira; Rita Fins	Poland; Li Qian; Natalia Partyka; Natalia Bajor; Julia Slazak; Anna Wegrzyn
Women's team	Romania; Bernadette Szőcs; Elizabeta Samara; Daniela Dodean; Irina Ciobanu; Adina Diaconu	Portugal; Fu Yu; Shao Jieni; Leila Oliveira; Rita Fins	Hungary; Georgina Póta; Dóra Madarász; Szandra Pergel; Leonie Hartbrich

== See also ==
- 2019 Europe Top 16 Cup
- 2019 ITTF World Tour
- 2019 ITTF World Tour Grand Finals
