= Jun Mizutani =

Japanese table tennis player (born 1989)

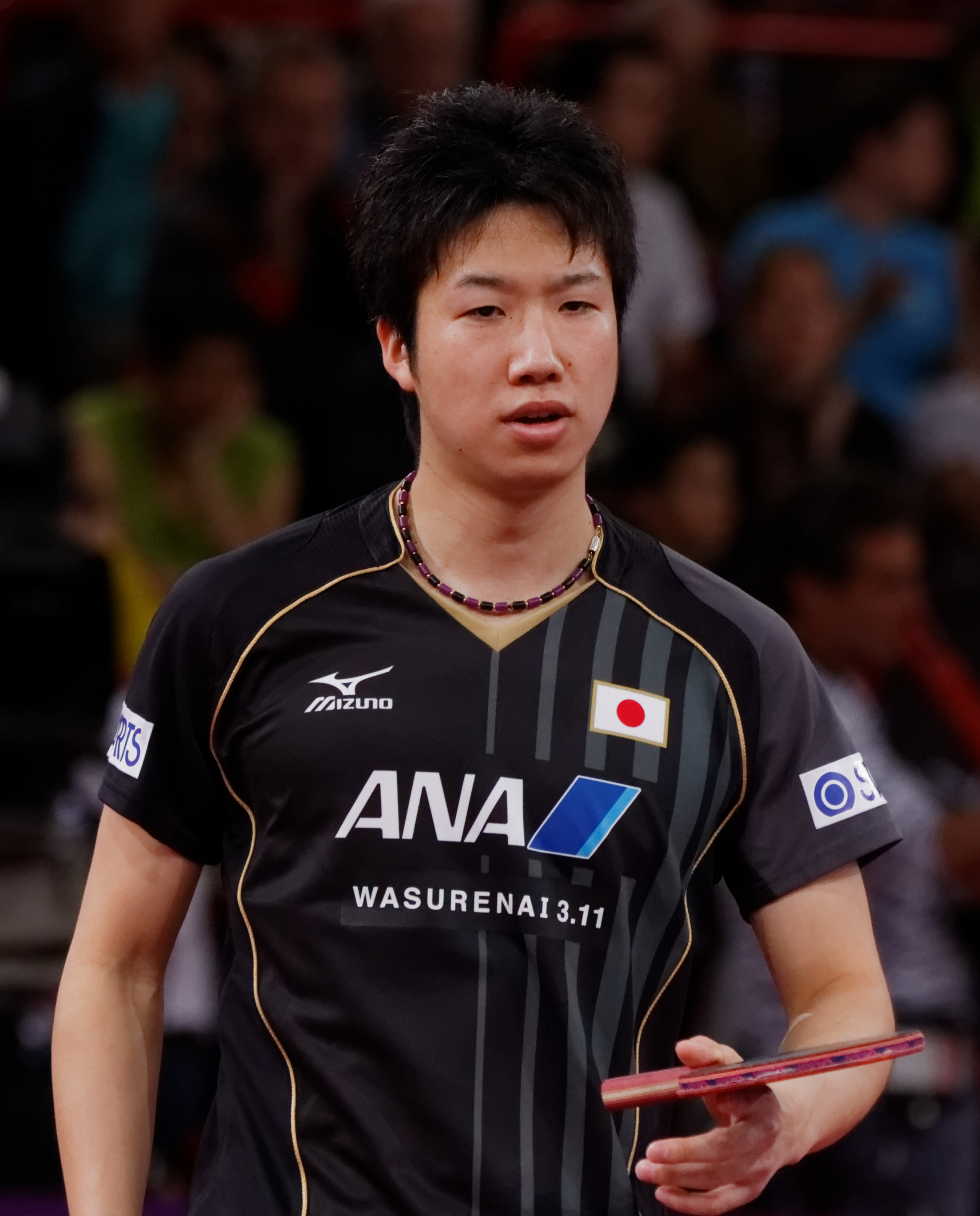
- Mizutani at the 2013 World Table Tennis Championships

Personal information
- Nationality: Japanese
- Born: 9 June 1989 (age 37) Iwata, Shizuoka, Japan
- Height: 172 cm (5 ft 8 in)
- Weight: 68 kg (150 lb)

Sport
- Sport: Table tennis
- Club: Kinoshita Meister Tokyo
- Playing style: Left-handed, Shakehand grip
- Equipment: Butterfly, Blade: Mizutani Jun ZLC, Rubbers: Dignics 80 in the forehand, and Dignics 80 in the backhand.
- Highest ranking: 4 (February 2017)
Medal record
Men's table tennis
Representing Japan
Event	1st	2nd	3rd
Olympic Games	1	1	2
World Championships	0	1	6
Total	1	2	8
Olympic Games
Gold medal – first place	2020 Tokyo	Mixed Doubles
Silver medal – second place	2016 Rio de Janeiro	Team
Bronze medal – third place	2020 Tokyo	Team
Bronze medal – third place	2016 Rio de Janeiro	Singles
World Championships
Silver medal – second place	2016 Kuala Lumpur	Team
Bronze medal – third place	2008 Guangzhou	Team
Bronze medal – third place	2009 Yokohama	Doubles
Bronze medal – third place	2010 Moscow	Team
Bronze medal – third place	2012 Dortmund	Team
Bronze medal – third place	2013 Paris	Doubles
Bronze medal – third place	2014 Tokyo	Team
Asian Championships
Silver medal – second place	2007 Yangzhou	Team
Silver medal – second place	2009 Lucknow	Team
Silver medal – second place	2012 Macau	Team
Silver medal – second place	2013 Busan	Team
Bronze medal – third place	2007 Yangzhou	Doubles
Asian Cup
Bronze medal – third place	2007 Hanoi	Singles
Bronze medal – third place	2014 Wuhan	Singles
Bronze medal – third place	2015 Jaipur	Singles

Jun Mizutani (水谷 隼, Mizutani Jun; born 9 June 1989) is a retired Japanese table tennis player and Olympic champion. He became the youngest Japanese national champion at the age of 17. He has the distinction of being the first male singles titlist to achieve five consecutive national championships: 2007 to 2011.

Throughout his career, Mizutani competed in 4 Olympic games from 2008 to 2020. After defeating Vladimir Samsonov for the bronze medal by 4–1 in the 2016 Summer Olympics, he finally seized his first singles medal in the three main international tournaments. It was also the first Olympic table tennis singles medal of his country. At the 2020 Summer Olympics, Mizutani and Mima Ito won gold in the inaugural mixed doubles event.

== Career ==
=== 2016 ===
At the 2016 Summer Olympics in Rio de Janeiro, Brazil, Mizutani earned a bronze medal in the singles event which was his first singles medal at the Olympics, after defeating Vladimir Samsonov in the bronze medal match. Later, he received a silver medal in the team event with his teammates Koki Niwa and Maharu Yoshimura losing to the Chinese team.

=== 2021 ===
In March, Jun Mizutani played in the WTT Star Contender event at WTT Doha, but he suffered a round-of-16 upset to Ruwen Filus.

At the 2020 Summer Olympics in Tokyo, Mizutani and Mima Ito defeated Liu Shiwen and Xu Xin in the mixed doubles finals to become the first non-Chinese to win gold at an Olympic table tennis event since 2004. Additionally, Mizutani earned a bronze medal in the team event alongside Koki Niwa and Tomokazu Harimoto beating the South Korean team.

Mizutani retired after the 2020 Summer Olympics which was confirmed by World Table Tennis on 10 February 2022. His increasing sight difficulties had forced him to wear special glasses during matches and he cited that it contributed to him retiring.

== Personal life ==
Mizutani married his girlfriend on 22 November 2013. On 14 October 2014, he announced on his blog that his daughter had been born.

Mizutani appeared in the 2017 film Mixed Doubles as himself.

== Career records ==
=== Singles ===
As of August 12, 2016

- Olympics: round of 32 (2008), round of 16 (2012), 3rd place (2016)
- World Championships: QF (2011, 2015)
- World Cup appearances: 5. Record: 4th (2010, 2011, 2014, 2015)
- ITTF World Tour winner (7): Korea Open 2009, Hungarian Open 2010, Kuwait Open, Japan Open 2012, Slovenia Open, Australian Open, Polish Open 2016; Runner-up (4): Japan Open 2010, Japan Open 2011, Japan Open 2014, Austrian Open 2015
- ITTF World Tour Grand Finals: winner (2010, 2014)
- Asian Games: SF (2010)
- Asian Championships: QF (2009, 2012)
- Asian Cup: 3rd (2007, 2014, 2015)

=== Men's doubles ===
- World Championships: SF (2009)
- ITTF World Tour winner (2): China (Suzhou), Japan Open 2009; Runner-up (4): Chinese Taipei Open 2006, German, English Open 2009, Hungarian Open 2010
- Asian Games: QF (2006)
- Asian Championships: SF (2007)

=== Mixed doubles ===
- World Championships: round of 16 (2009)
- ITTF Tour Winner (2020)
- Olympic: Winner (2021)

=== Team ===
- Olympics: 5th (2008, 2012), 2nd (2016)
- World Championships: 3rd (2008, 10, 12, 14), 2nd (2016)
- World Team Cup: 5th (2009)
- Asian Games: SF (2010, 14)
- Asian Championships: 2nd (2007, 09, 12, 13)
