= Table tennis at the 2016 Summer Olympics =

Table tennis at the Games of the XXXI Olympiad
- Venue: Riocentro – Pavilion 3
- Dates: 6–17 August 2016
- No. of events: 4
- Competitors: 172 from 56 nations

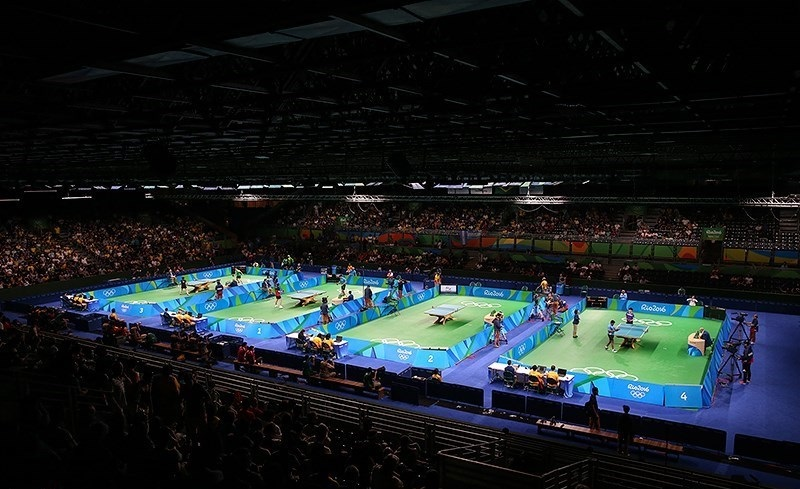
Riocentro as the venue

Table tennis at the 2016 Summer Olympics in Rio de Janeiro took place from 6 to 17 August 2016 at the third pavilion of Riocentro. Around 172 table tennis players (equally distributed between men and women) competed in both the singles and team events. Table tennis had appeared at the Summer Olympics on seven previous occasions beginning with the 1988 Summer Olympics in Seoul. In addition to men's and women's singles, the team events were staged for the third time since replacing doubles events at the 2008 Summer Olympics in Beijing.

== Qualification ==
As the host nation, Brazil had automatically qualified six athletes; a team of three men and women with one each competing in the singles.

The top 22 male and top 22 female players on the International Table Tennis Federation's Olympic ranking list as of 1 January 2016 were qualified for the singles event at the Games. No nation could have more than two players per gender in the singles at these Games, so some players below the twenty-eighth position were given a qualifying place based on ranking.

Forty places were awarded to the table tennis players with a maximum of two per NOC and gender through the following continental qualification tournaments between 1 July 2015 and 24 April 2016: six each from Africa and Latin America, eleven each from Asia and Europe, and three each from North America and Oceania. One invitational place per gender was allocated by the International Table Tennis Federation (ITTF).

For the team events, the highest-ranked NOC from each continent that already contained two qualified players for the singles added a quota place to form a team of three players and thereby secured a direct qualifying place for the Games based on the ITTF Olympic Team Ranking list. The remaining ten teams were allotted to the nine highest-ranked NOCs in any continent and to the host nation Brazil (if not qualified by any means) that have two players qualified for the singles. If less than nine nations, the next best teams with a single player would have secured a place for the Olympics.

== Competition schedule ==
Legend
P	Preliminary round	¼	Quarter-finals	½	Semi-finals	F	Final

Event↓/Date →	Sat 6	Sun 7	Mon 8	Tue 9	Wed 10		Thu 11		Fri 12	Sat 13	Sun 14	Mon 15	Tue 16	Wed 17
Men's singles	P			¼			½	F						
Men's team									P		¼	½		F
Women's singles	P			¼	½	F								
Women's team									P	¼	½		F	

== Participating ==
=== Participating nations ===
A total of 172 athletes (86 men and 86 women), representing 56 NOCs, competed in four events.

- Australia (6)
- Austria (6)
- Belarus (3)
- Brazil (6)
- Canada (2)
- China (6)
- Colombia (1)
- Republic of the Congo (3)
- Croatia (1)
- Cuba (2)
- Czech Republic (4)
- Denmark (1)
- Egypt (5)
- Fiji (1)
- Finland (1)
- France (4)
- Germany (6)
- Great Britain (3)
- Greece (1)
- Hong Kong (6)
- Hungary (3)
- India (4)
- Iran (3)
- Japan (6)
- Kazakhstan (1)
- Lebanon (1)
- Luxembourg (1)
- Mexico (2)
- Netherlands (3)
- Nigeria (5)
- North Korea (3)
- Paraguay (1)
- Philippines (1)
- Poland (6)
- Portugal (5)
- Puerto Rico (2)
- Qatar (1)
- Romania (5)
- Russia (3)
- Serbia (1)
- Singapore (5)
- Slovakia (3)
- Slovenia (1)
- South Korea (6)
- Spain (3)
- Sweden (5)
- Syria (1)
- Chinese Taipei (6)
- Thailand (3)
- Tunisia (1)
- Turkey (2)
- Ukraine (2)
- United States (6)
- Uzbekistan (1)
- Vanuatu (1)
- Venezuela (1)

== Medal summary ==
=== Medal table ===
Rank	Nation	Gold	Silver	Bronze	Total
1	China	4	2	0	6
2	Japan	0	1	2	3
3	Germany	0	1	1	2
4	North Korea	0	0	1	1
Totals (4 entries)		4	4	4	12

=== Events ===
Event	Gold	Silver	Bronze
Men's singles	Ma Long; China	Zhang Jike; China	Jun Mizutani; Japan
Men's team	China; Zhang Jike; Ma Long; Xu Xin	Japan; Koki Niwa; Jun Mizutani; Maharu Yoshimura	Germany; Timo Boll; Dimitrij Ovtcharov; Bastian Steger
Women's singles	Ding Ning; China	Li Xiaoxia; China	Kim Song-i; North Korea
Women's team	China; Liu Shiwen; Ding Ning; Li Xiaoxia	Germany; Han Ying; Petrissa Solja; Shan Xiaona	Japan; Ai Fukuhara; Kasumi Ishikawa; Mima Ito

== See also ==
- Table tennis at the 2016 Summer Paralympics
- 2016 ITTF World Tour
- 2016 ITTF World Tour Grand Finals
- 2016 World Team Table Tennis Championships
