= Feng Yijun =

American table tennis player

Yijun "Tom" Feng (born February 12, 1997) is an American table tennis player and sports administrator. He competed for the United States at the 2016 Summer Olympics and was an alternate for the U.S. team at the 2020 Summer Olympics. Since 2025, he has served on the board of directors of USA Table Tennis.

== Early life and education ==
Feng was born in Nanjing, China, and moved to Texas at age eight, later settling in Georgia, where he trained at the Atlanta International Table Tennis Academy.

Feng attended the University of Georgia for the 2016–17 year before transferring to New York University, where he graduated from the Preston Robert Tisch Institute for Global Sport in 2020 with a degree in sports management. He then pursued a master's degree at the NYU Stern School of Business.

== Table tennis career ==
In 2015 Feng won the men's singles, men's doubles and mixed doubles titles at the U.S. National Table Tennis Championships. In April 2016 he won the first singles and team spots on the U.S. Olympic team at the North American Olympic qualification tournament, defeating Sharon Alguetti. In June 2016 he won the ITTF North America Cup, defeating Kanak Jha 4–1 in the final, which qualified him for the 2016 ITTF Men's World Cup.

At the 2016 Summer Olympics in Rio de Janeiro, Feng lost in the first round of the men's singles to He Zhiwen, and was part of the U.S. team eliminated by Sweden in the men's team event. He made his ITTF Men's World Cup debut in Saarbrücken, Germany, in October 2016.

While studying at New York University, Feng played in the Austrian Division I League for TTC Wiener Neustadt and for the U.S. national team. In August 2018 he led NYU to the College Table Tennis National Championship; he and Adar Alguetti clinched the title in doubles. He was an alternate for the U.S. team at the postponed 2020 Summer Olympics in Tokyo.

In Major League Table Tennis he played for the Chicago Wind and later joined the Atlanta Blazers for the 2025–26 season.

== Administrative career ==
In December 2024 Feng was elected by the sport's 10-year elite athletes as the Third Elite Athlete Representative on the USA Table Tennis Board of Directors, with a term running from January 1, 2025, to December 31, 2028. He also serves as chair of the seven-member Athletes' Advisory Council.
