= Emmanuel Lebesson =

French table tennis player

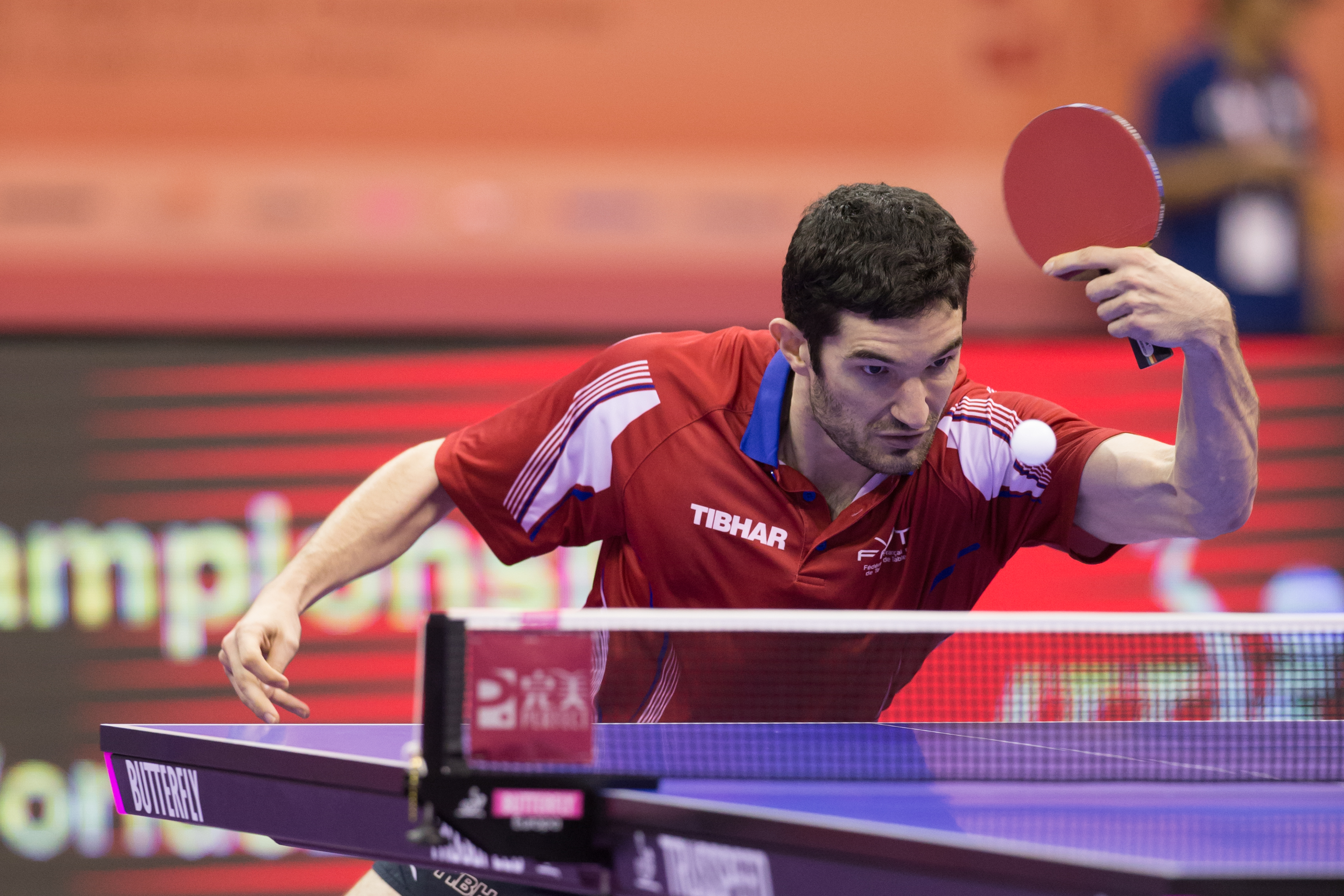
- Lebesson in 2016

Personal information
- Nationality: French
- Born: 24 April 1988 (age 38) Niort, France
- Height: 180 cm (5 ft 11 in)

Sport
- Sport: Table tennis
- Club: (Greece) Panathinaikos
- Playing style: Left-handed shakehand grip
- Highest ranking: 20 (September 2017)
- Current ranking: 39 (19 July 2022)
Medal record
Men's table tennis
Representing France
European Championships
Gold medal – first place	2016 Budapest	Singles
Gold medal – first place	2022 Munich	Mixed doubles
Bronze medal – third place	2015 Yekaterinburg	Team
Bronze medal – third place	2017 Luxembourg City	Team
Bronze medal – third place	2019 Nantes	Team
Bronze medal – third place	2020 Warsaw	Mixed doubles

Emmanuel Lebesson (born 24 April 1988) is a French table tennis player. He competed at the 2016 Summer Olympics in the men's singles event, in which he was eliminated by Adrian Crișan, and as part of the French team in the men's team event. In October 2016 he won the men's singles title at the European Table Tennis Championships, defeating compatriot Simon Gauzy in the final.

== Major League Table Tennis ==
In May 2024, Lebesson was selected by the Chicago Wind as the No. 2 overall pick in the Major League Table Tennis (MLTT) draft for the 2024–25 season.

During the 2025–26 season, Lebesson was named Player of the Week twice. He first received the honor in November 2025 (Week 7) after winning all nine of his singles games during the weekend, becoming the third player in league history to complete a weekend without a singles loss. He earned his second Player of the Week title in February 2026 (Week 11). By late 2025, he was ranked among the top ten players in the league's power ratings, leading the league in both singles wins and "Golden Game" points at that stage of the season.
