= Alexey Liventsov =

Russian table tennis player

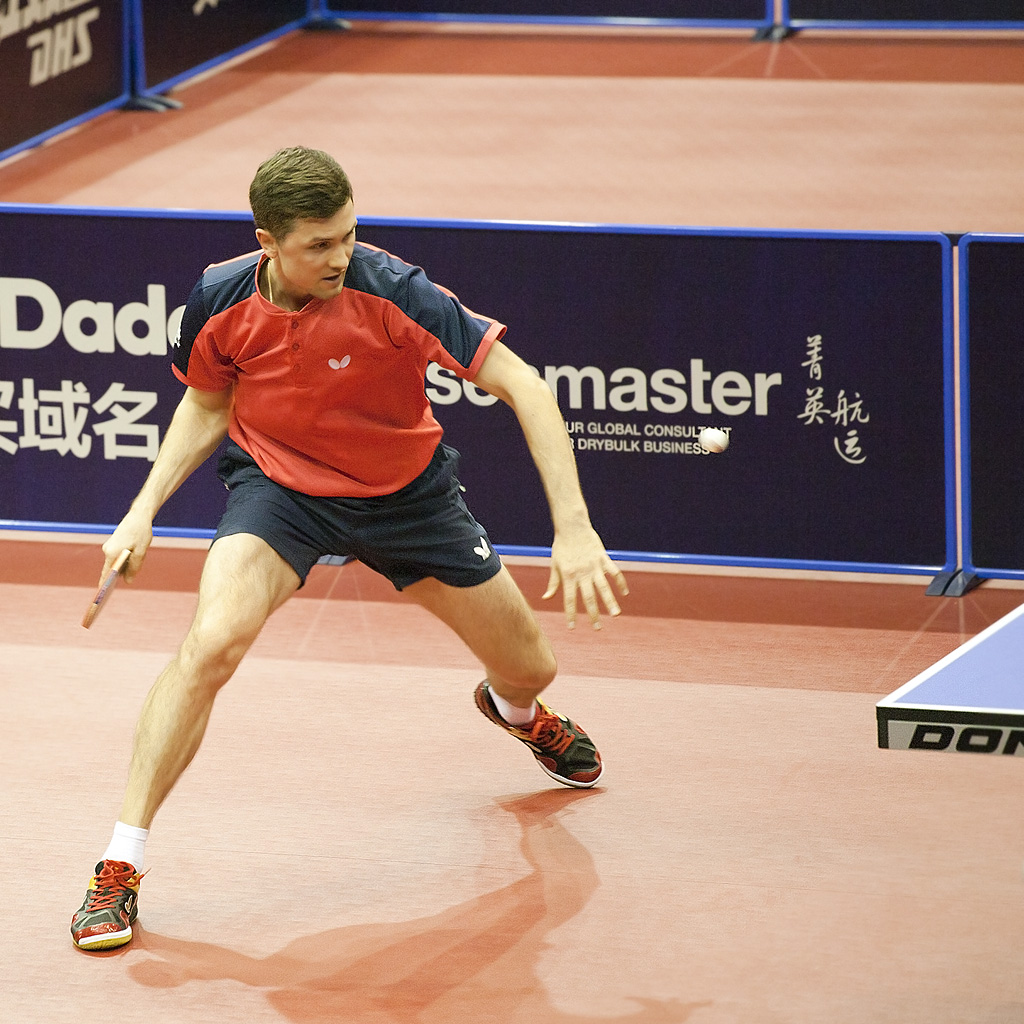
- ITTF World Tour 2017 German Open, Magdeburg, Germany

Personal information
- Full name: Alexey Vyacheslavovich Liventsov
- Nationality: Russia
- Born: 2 November 1981 (age 44) Ryazan, Russian SFSR, Soviet Union
- Height: 1.88 m (6 ft 2 in)
- Weight: 80 kg (176 lb)

Sport
- Sport: Table tennis
- Club: Ping Pong Club Villeneuvois
- Playing style: Right-handed, classic
- Equipment: Butterfly
- Highest ranking: 54 (March 2015)
- Current ranking: 139 (January 2018)
Medal record
Men's table tennis
Representing Russia
European Championships
Bronze medal – third place	2011 Gdańsk–Sopot	Doubles
Bronze medal – third place	2012 Herning	Doubles
Bronze medal – third place	2013 Schwechat	Team

Alexey Vyacheslavovich Liventsov (also Alexey Liventsov, Russian: Алексей Вячеславович Ливенцов; born November 2, 1981, in Ryazan, Russian SFSR) is a Russian table tennis player. He captured three bronze medals on European Championships: in 2011 and 2012 in doubles, and in 2013 with team.

In 2017 Alexey Liventsov won Russian Championships in singles.
