= Zokhid Kenjaev =

Uzbekistani table tennis player (born 1992)

Zokhid Kenjaev (born 30 March 1992) is an Uzbekistani table tennis player. He competed at the 2016 Summer Olympics in the men's singles event, in which he was eliminated in the second round by Liam Pitchford.
