= Mattias Falck =

Swedish table tennis player (born 1991)

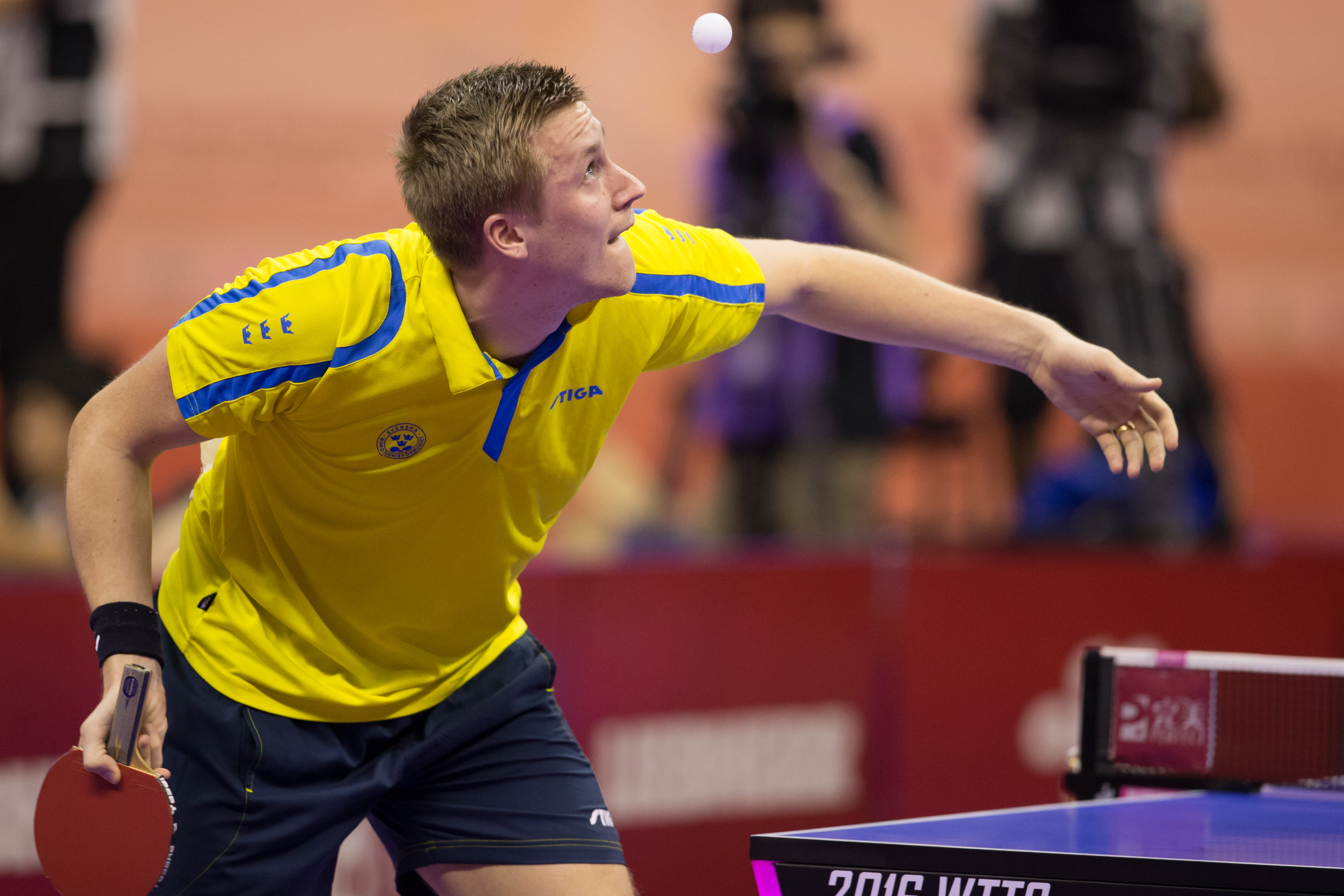
- Karlsson in 2016

Personal information
- Native name: Mattias Karlsson
- Born: 7 September 1991 (age 35) Karlskrona, Sweden
- Height: 1.91 m (6 ft 3 in)
- Weight: 88 kg (194 lb)

Sport
- Sport: Table tennis
- Playing style: Right-handed, shakehand grip
- Equipment: Yasaka Ma Lin Soft Carbon blade; Yasaka Rakza PO (Black, 2.00mm, FH); Yasaka Rakza X (Red, 2.3mm, BH)
- Highest ranking: 7 (August 2019)
- Current ranking: 98 (2 November 2026)
Medal record
Men's table tennis
Representing Sweden
World Championships
Gold medal – first place	2021 Houston	Doubles
Silver medal – second place	2019 Budapest	Singles
Bronze medal – third place	2018 Halmstad	Team
European Games
Silver medal – second place	2019 Minsk	Team
European Championships
Gold medal – first place	2022 Munich	Doubles
Gold medal – first place	2023 Malmö	Team
Silver medal – second place	2011 Gdansk-Sopot	Team
Silver medal – second place	2012 Herning	Doubles
Silver medal – second place	2016 Budapest	Mixed doubles
Silver medal – second place	2018 Alicante	Doubles
Bronze medal – third place	2015 Yekaterinburg	Doubles
Bronze medal – third place	2016 Budapest	Doubles
Bronze medal – third place	2019 Nantes	Team
Bronze medal – third place	2020 Warsaw	Singles
Bronze medal – third place	2021 Cluj-Napoca	Team
Bronze medal – third place	2022 Munich	Singles
Bronze medal – third place	2024 Linz	Doubles
Europe Top-16
Bronze medal – third place	2021 Thessaloniki	Singles

Mattias Karlsson (Mattias Falck from 2018 to 2026) (born 7 September 1991) is a Swedish table tennis player.

== Career ==
He competed at the 2016 Summer Olympics as he was part of the Swedish team in the men's team event. Mattias won two medals at the 2016 European Table Tennis Championships. Paired with Matilda Ekholm he won a silver medal in mixed doubles, and paired with Kristian Karlsson he won a bronze medal in men's doubles. He won the Swedish National team championship with Halmstad BTK 2018 same years as he was a part of the Swedish National team who won a bronze medal at WTTC 2018 which was played in Halmstad Arena (the same arena where Halmstad BTK won gold a month later).

In April 2019, he won a silver medal in the men's singles competition during the World Championships in Budapest, Hungary, after losing the final to Ma Long from China.

Karlsson's highest world rank was 7th, attained in August 2019.

In 2020, Karlsson upset Xu Xin at the WTT Macau event in ITTF's restart campaign following the coronavirus pandemic.

=== 2021 ===
In March, Karlsson was upset by Dimitrij Ovtcharov in the quarter-finals of the WTT Contender event at WTT Doha. He was upset in the round of 32 by An Jaehyun in the WTT Star Contender event.

In June, Karlsson reached the semi-finals of the 2021 European Table Tennis Championships, where he was upset in the semi-finals by eventual champion Timo Boll.

Karlsson had a disappointing 2020 Olympics, losing in the round of 16 in the singles event to Omar Assar. In the team event, Sweden defeated USA in the first round 3–1, but Falck was upset by Kanak Jha. Sweden lost to Japan in the quarter-finals after Koki Niwa upset Karlsson in the fourth round. Niwa later stated that Karlsson's forehand was not in good condition.

Mattias and Kristian Karlsson became World champions in the men's doubles at the 2021 World Table Tennis Championships becoming the first Swedish duo to win gold since 1991.

=== 2023 ===
In August, Karlsson won WTT Contender title at Rio de Janeiro after defeating Sora Matsushima from Japan in 4-2 set score and winning the WTT title for the very first time. In September, Karlsson was playing in the Swedish National team that won the 2023 STUPA European Table Tennis Championships in Malmö. That victory marked Sweden's first team title win in 21 years. The team also consisted of Truls Moregardh, Kristian Karlsson and Anton Kallberg. Jorgen Persson was head coach.

== Playing style ==
Karlsson plays with short pips on his forehand. He has stated that his style benefited from the switch to the plastic ball and that he was surprised that more men with pips have not emerged since the ball switch.

== Personal life ==
In 2018, Mattias adopted his wife's surname, Falck, upon marriage. He resumed using his birth name, Karlsson, following their divorce in 2026.
