= Daniel Górak =

Polish table tennis player

Personal information
- Nationality: Poland
- Born: 9 October 1983 (age 42) Kraków, Poland
- Height: 1.78 m (5 ft 10 in)
- Weight: 77 kg (170 lb; 12.1 st)

Sport
- Sport: Table tennis
- Highest ranking: 52 (March 2015)
Medal record
Men's table tennis
Representing Poland
European Championships
Silver medal – second place	2016 Budapest	Doubles
Bronze medal – third place	2007 Belgrade	Team

Daniel Górak (born 9 October 1983) is a Polish table tennis player. He competed at the 2016 Summer Olympics as part of the Polish team in the men's team event and is currently playing for PKS Jarosław Kolping.
