= Jakub Dyjas =

Polish table tennis player (born 1995)

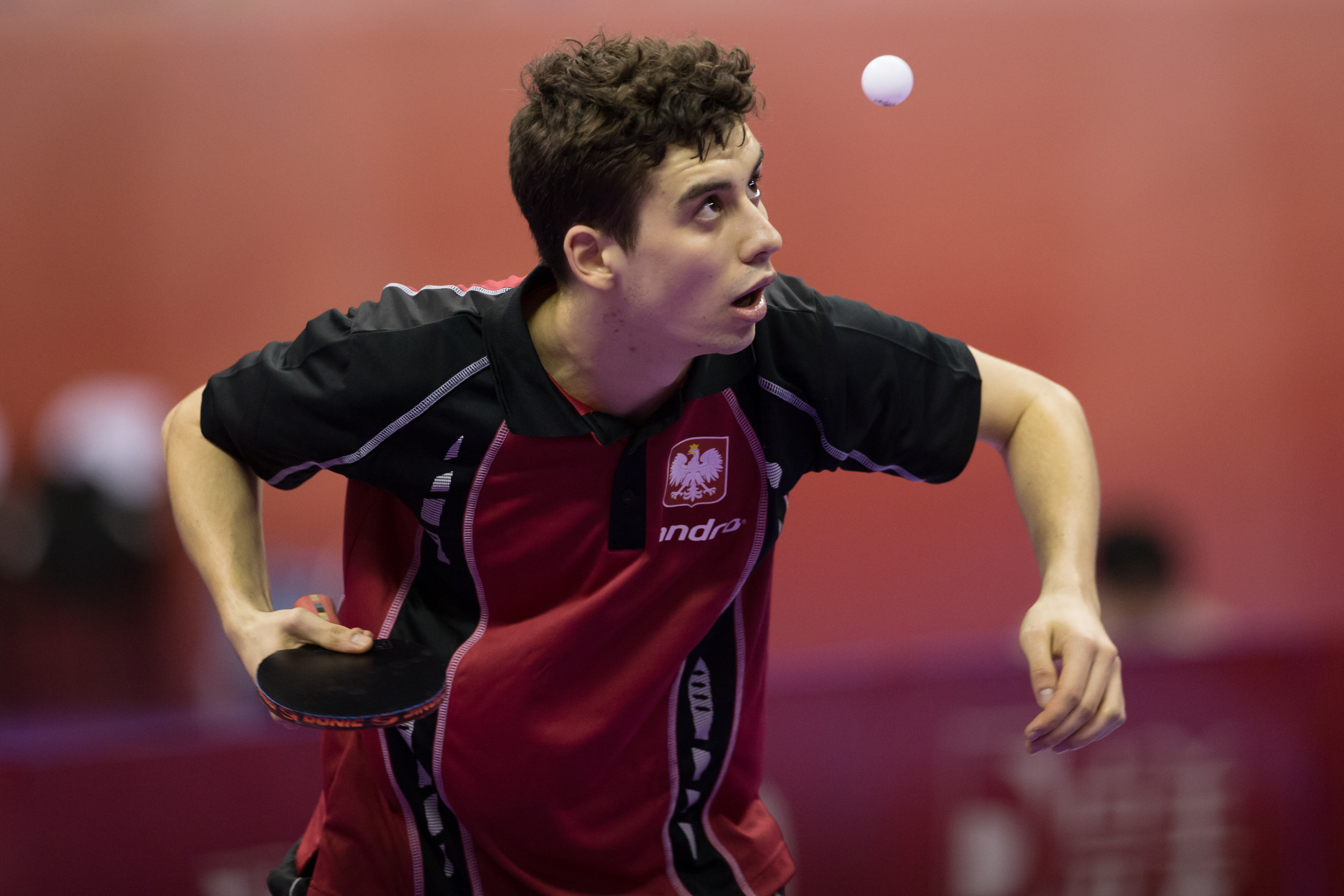
- Dyjas in 2016

Personal information
- Nationality: Poland
- Born: 9 October 1995 (age 30) Koszalin, Poland
- Height: 1.83 m (6 ft 0 in)
- Weight: 54 kg (119 lb; 8.5 st)

Sport
- Sport: Table tennis
- Club: (Greece) Panathinaikos
- Highest ranking: 68 (28 September 2021)
Medal record
Men's table tennis
Representing Poland
European Championships
Silver medal – second place	2016 Budapest	Doubles
Bronze medal – third place	2016 Budapest	Singles

Jakub Dyjas (born 9 October 1995) is a Polish table tennis player. He competed at the 2016 Summer Olympics in the men's singles event, in which he was eliminated in the second round by Alexander Shibaev, and as part of the Polish team in the men's team event. On club level he competes for Panathinaikos.
