= Simon Gauzy =

French table tennis player

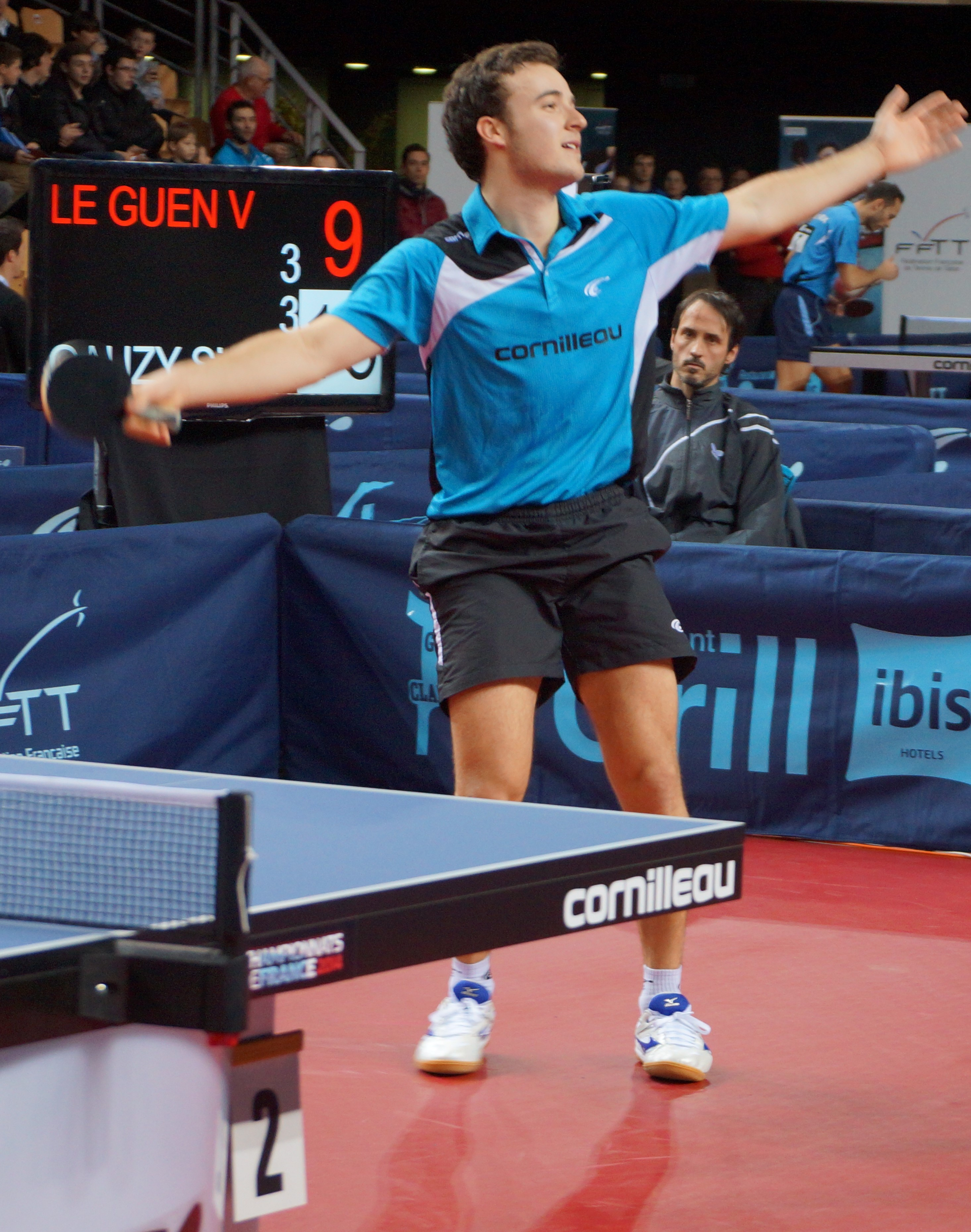
- Gauzy in 2014

Personal information
- Born: 25 October 1994 (age 31) Toulouse, France
- Height: 1.82 m (6 ft 0 in)

Sport
- Sport: Table tennis
- Club: TTF Liebherr Ochsenhausen (Germany)
- Playing style: Right-handed shakehand
- Equipment: Andro Synteliac VCI (Blade), Andro NUZN 55 (FH), Andro NUZN 55 (BH)
- Highest ranking: 8 (November 2017)
- Current ranking: 28 (5 October 2026)
Medal record
Men's table tennis
Representing France
Olympic Games
Bronze medal – third place	2024 Paris	Team
World Championships
Silver medal – second place	2024 Busan	Team
Bronze medal – third place	2026 London	Team
European Games
Silver medal – second place	2015 Baku	Team
Bronze medal – third place	2023 Kraków–Małopolska	Team
European Championships
Gold medal – first place	2025 Zadar	Team
Silver medal – second place	2016 Budapest	Singles
Bronze medal – third place	2015 Ekaterinburg	Team
Bronze medal – third place	2017 Luxembourg City	Team
Bronze medal – third place	2019 Nantes	Team
Bronze medal – third place	2020 Warsaw	Mixed doubles
Bronze medal – third place	2024 Linz	Mixed doubles
Youth Olympic Games
Bronze medal – third place	2010 Singapore	Singles

Simon Gauzy (born 25 October 1994) is a French table tennis player. He competed at the 2016 Summer Olympics in the men's singles event, in which he was eliminated in the third round by Kou Lei, and as part of the French team in the men's team event. He is a 3-time French National champion in singles.
