= Adrian Crișan =

Romanian table tennis player

Personal information
- Nickname: Crisi
- Nationality: Romania
- Born: 7 May 1980 (age 46) Bistriţa, Romania
- Height: 1.85 m (6 ft 1 in)
- Weight: 86 kg (190 lb; 13.5 st)

Sport
- Sport: Table tennis
- Club: SV Werder Bremen (Germany)
- Playing style: Right-handed, shakehand grip
- Highest ranking: 10 (January 2006)
Medal record
Men's table tennis
Representing Romania
European Championships
Bronze medal – third place	2005 Aarhus	Team
Bronze medal – third place	2007 Belgrade	Team
Bronze medal – third place	2009 Stuttgart	Team
Bronze medal – third place	2012 Herning	Singles

Adrian Crișan (born 7 May 1980) is a Romanian professional table tennis player who currently plays with SV Werder Bremen. He competed in the Summer Olympic Games in 2000, 2004, 2008, 2012 and 2016. He ranked as high as #10 in the World Rankings in January 2006, and is ranked #52 as of October 2016.

Crișan is a ten-time singles champion of Romania (2002, 2004, 2005, 2006, 2007, 2008, 2010, 2011, 2012, 2013).

He is currently trained by Cristian Tamaș.

== Clubs ==
- 1996–1997: (Romania) CSM Bistriţa
- 1997–1999: (Germany) 1. FC Bayreuth
- 1999–2000: (Germany) SV Plüderhausen
- 2000–2010: (Germany) TTF Liebherr Ochsenhausen
- 2010–2015: (Germany) SV Werder Bremen
- 2015–2020: (France) Stella Sport La Romagne
