= Stefan Fegerl =

Austrian table tennis player

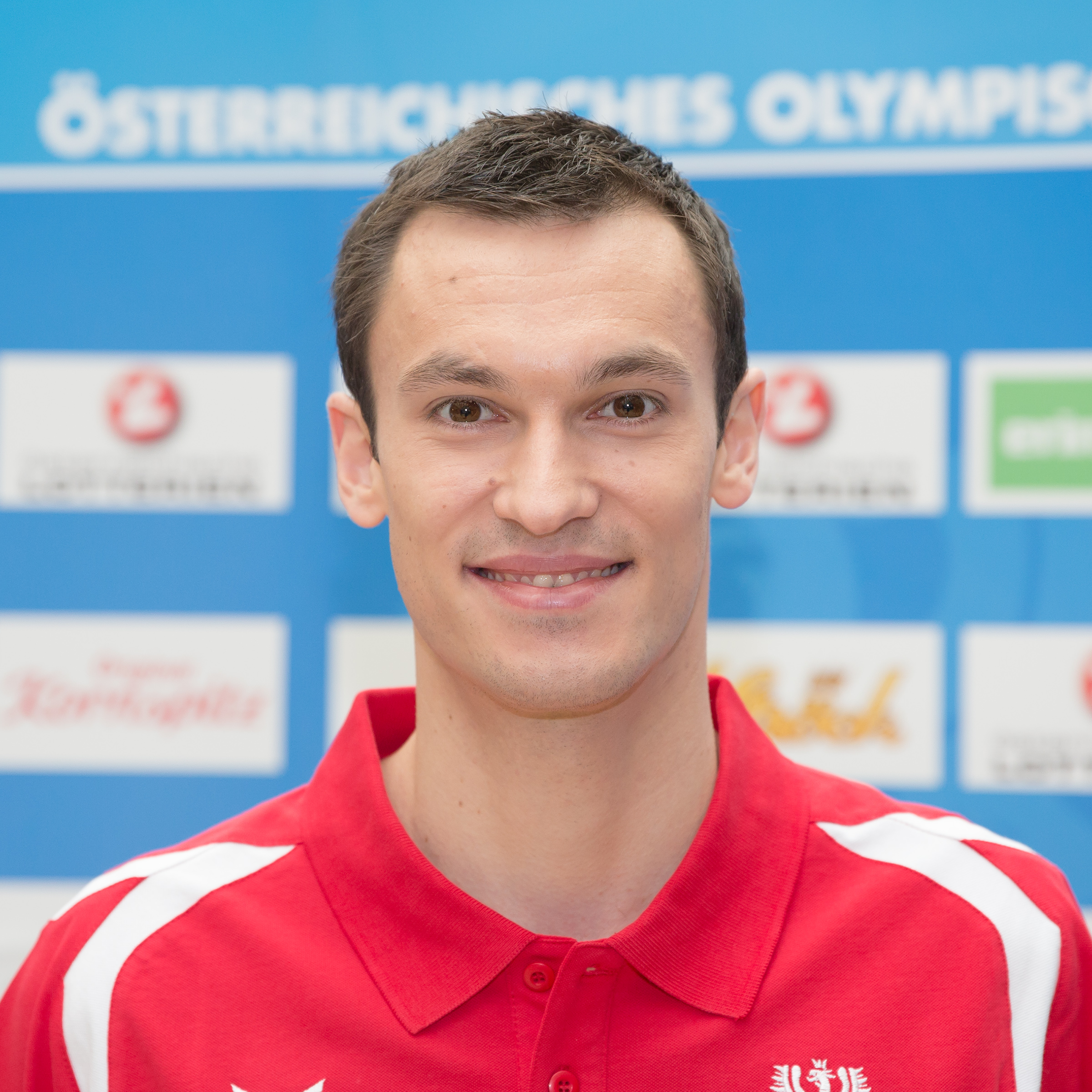
Fegerl in 2016

Stefan Fegerl (born 12 September 1988 in Gmünd) is an Austrian table tennis player. He competed at the 2016 Summer Olympics in the men's singles event, in which he was eliminated in the third round by Koki Niwa, and as part of the Austrian team in the men's team event. In 2021, he competed in the 2020 Olympics.
