= Vladimir Samsonov =

Belarusian table tennis player

Vladimir Samsonov Uładzimir Samsonau
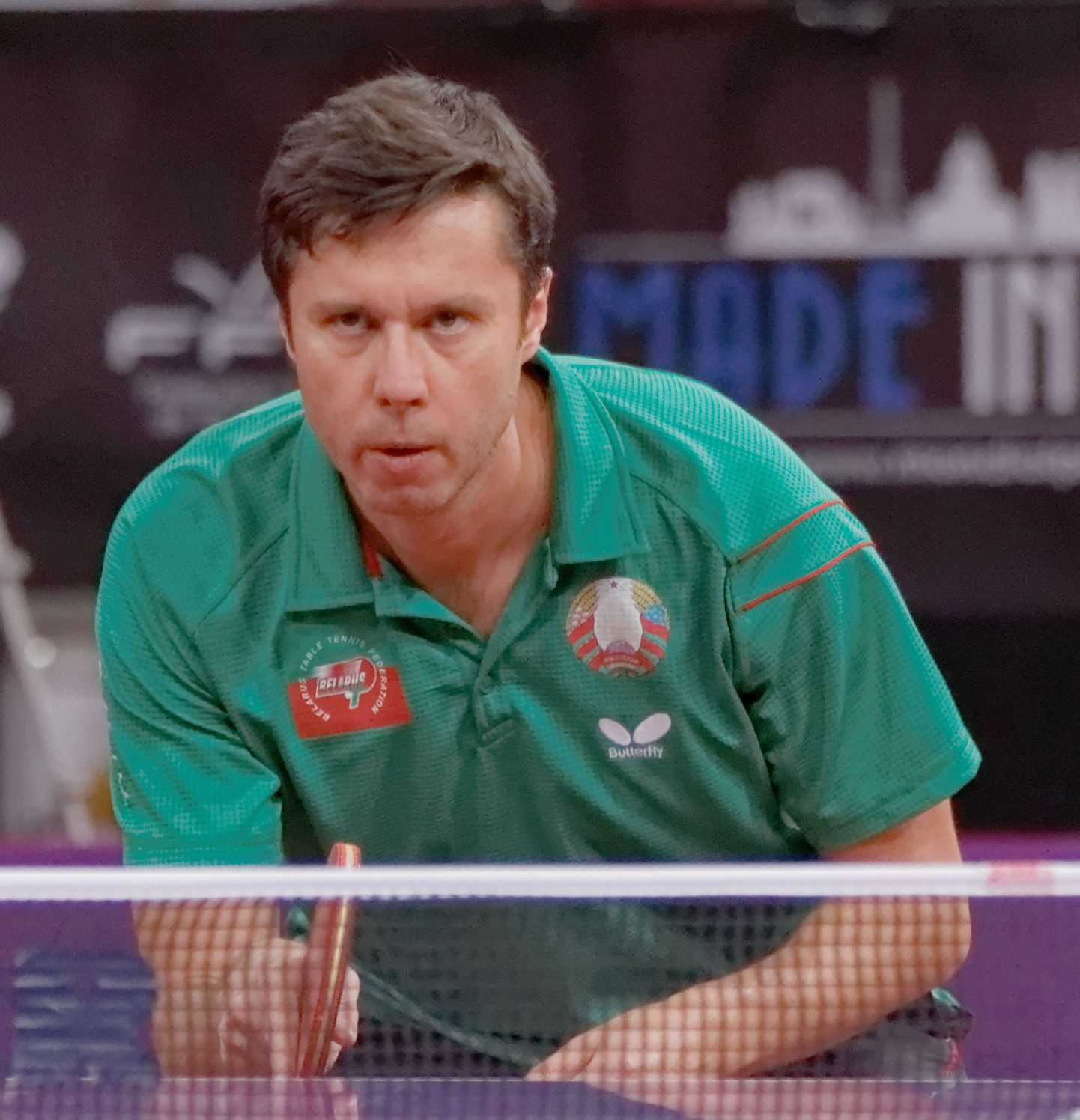
- Samsonov at the 2013 World Championships

Personal information
- Full name: Vladimir Viktorovich Samsonov; Uładzimir Viktaravich Samsonau
- Nickname: Vladi
- Nationality: Belarus
- Born: 17 April 1976 (age 50) Minsk, Byelorussian SSR, Soviet Union
- Height: 190 cm (6 ft 3 in)
- Weight: 83 kg (183 lb)

Sport
- Sport: Table tennis
- Club: Royal Villette Charleroi
- Playing style: Right-handed, shakehand grip
- Equipment: Tibhar: blade – Samsonov VS Unlimited, rubbers – Evolution MX-P
- Highest ranking: 1 (December 1999)
Medal record
Men's table tennis
Representing Belarus
World Championships
| Silver medal – second place | 1995 Tianjin | Doubles |
| Silver medal – second place | 1997 Manchester | Singles |
| Bronze medal – third place | 1999 Eindhoven | Doubles |
World Cup
| Gold medal – first place | 1999 Xiaolan | Singles |
| Gold medal – first place | 2001 Courmayeur | Singles |
| Gold medal – first place | 2009 Moscow | Singles |
| Silver medal – second place | 2013 Verviers | Singles |
| Bronze medal – third place | 1996 Nimes | Singles |
| Bronze medal – third place | 1997 Nimes | Singles |
| Bronze medal – third place | 2012 Liverpool | Singles |
European Championships
| Gold medal – first place | 1996 Bratislava | Mixed doubles |
| Gold medal – first place | 1998 Eindhoven | Singles |
| Gold medal – first place | 1998 Eindhoven | Doubles |
| Gold medal – first place | 2003 Courmayeur | Singles |
| Gold medal – first place | 2003 Courmayeur | Team |
| Gold medal – first place | 2005 Aarhus | Singles |
| Silver medal – second place | 2005 Aarhus | Doubles |
| Silver medal – second place | 2007 Belgrade | Singles |
| Silver medal – second place | 2008 Saint-Petersburg | Singles |
| Silver medal – second place | 2008 Saint-Petersburg | Team |
| Silver medal – second place | 2010 Ostrava | Team |
| Silver medal – second place | 2013 Schwechat | Singles |
| Bronze medal – third place | 1994 Birmingham | Doubles |
| Bronze medal – third place | 2012 Herning | Doubles |
| Bronze medal – third place | 2013 Schwechat | Team |
| Bronze medal – third place | 2015 Ekaterinburg | Team |
European Games
| Silver medal – second place | 2015 Baku | Singles |

Vladimir Samsonov or Uładzimir Samsonau (Belarusian: Уладзімір Віктаравіч Самсонаў, Russian: Владимир Викторович Самсонов, born 17 April 1976) is a Belarusian former professional table tennis player. He is known in China as the "Tai Chi Master" because of his superb all-around style, both offensive and defensive. Samsonov competed at six consecutive Olympics between 1996 and 2016, placing fourth individually in 2016, in addition to equal fifth in 1996 and 2000.

== Career ==
Samsonov is also known as Mr. ECL (European Champions League), for winning a record 13 ECL titles (including two of its predecessor, European Club Cup of Champions) – three with Borussia (1997, 1998, 2000), and five each with Charleroi (2001, 2002, 2003, 2004, 2007) and Fakel Orenburg (2012, 2013, 2015, 2017, 2019). His 13 titles are not only the most ever by an athlete in table tennis, but also more than any male or female athlete has ever won in European Champions Leagues in all sports. He started playing for European top division clubs in 1994, when he signed with Borussia Düsseldorf, then six years later joined Royal Charleroi in Belgium. In 2008, he moved to Spain to play for SuperDivision club Cajagranada, but left after only one season to join the Russian Premier League club Fakel Orenburg, where he finished his career twelve years later.

Samsonov is famous for being a top-10 player spanning over a decade. He first joined the top-10 in 1996, then climbed to the top position in 1998. He stayed in the top-10 for 15 years until November 2011. His highest ranking was No. 1 in December 1999. He used to hold the distinction of being the player with most ITTF Pro/World Tour titles (27) until Ma Long surpassed him (28). He was runner-up in the 1997 World championships, and is also a three-time European champion (1998, 2003, 2005) and three-time World Cup winner (1999, 2001, 2009).

Samsonov was awarded the Richard Bergmann Fair Play Trophy at the world championships a record three times, in 2003, 2007 and 2013.

In 2021, despite qualifying for the Tokyo Olympics, his seventh time qualifying for the Olympics, Samsonov withdrew from the tournament and shortly after announced his retirement.

== Personal life ==
Since the age of seven, Samsonov had been coached by Alexandre Petkevich. Samsonov is a polyglot, speaking Russian, English, German, Serbian, and Spanish.
