= Tiago Apolónia =

Portuguese table tennis player

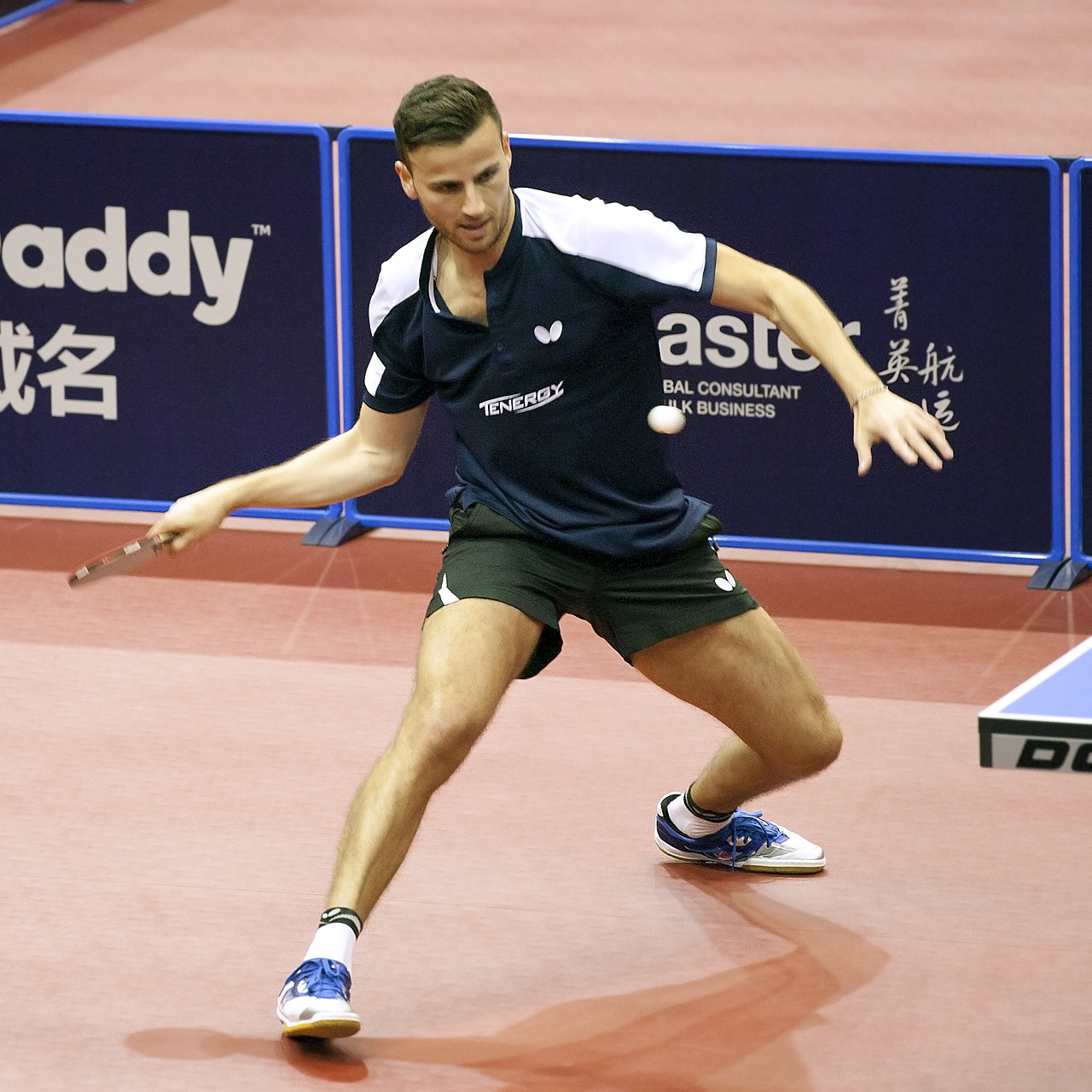
- Apolónia at the ITTF World Tour 2017 German Open

Personal information
- Born: 28 July 1986 (age 40) Lisbon, Portugal
- Height: 1.85 m (6 ft 1 in)
- Weight: 73 kg (161 lb)

Sport
- Sport: Table tennis
- Club: TTC Neu-Ulm
- Playing style: Shakehand, Offensive
- Equipment: Butterfly Tiago Apolonia ZLC (blade), Butterfly Tenergy 05 Hard (Black, FH), Butterfly Dignics 05 (Red, BH)
- Highest ranking: 13 (November 2014)
- Current ranking: 87 (2 November 2026)
Medal record
Men's table tennis
Representing Portugal
World Championships
Bronze medal – third place	2019 Budapest	Doubles
European Games
Gold medal – first place	2015 Baku	Team
Bronze medal – third place	2019 Minsk	Team
European Championships
Gold medal – first place	2014 Lisbon	Team
Silver medal – second place	2017 Luxembourg	Team
Silver medal – second place	2019 Nantes	Team
Bronze medal – third place	2008 Saint-Petersburg	Doubles
Bronze medal – third place	2011 Gdansk-Sopot	Team
Bronze medal – third place	2013 Schwechat	Doubles
Bronze medal – third place	2015 Ekaterinburg	Singles
Bronze medal – third place	2016 Budapest	Doubles
Bronze medal – third place	2020 Warsaw	Doubles
Bronze medal – third place	2023 Malmö	Team

Tiago André Barata Feio Peixoto Apolónia (born 28 July 1986) is a Portuguese table tennis player for German club TTF LIEBHERR Ochsenhausen and Portugal. As of August 2016, he is ranked the number eighteenth player in the world.

== Career ==
Born in Lisbon, Apolónia began playing table tennis aged six at his hometown club Estrela da Amadora. As a youth player, he was crowned European Junior Doubles champion in 2004 and won a silver medal in the Doubles competition at the Junior World Championships in 2003, both partnering Marcos Freitas. After playing for German clubs TTC indeland Jülich, 1. FC Saarbrücken and TTF LIEBHERR Ochsenhausen, he arrived at his current club TTC Neu-Ulm in 2019. In 2006, he won his first ITTF Pro Tour Doubles title in São Paulo, partnering João Monteiro. His first ITTF Pro Tour Singles title followed in October 2010 with the Austrian Open in Wels, where he beat Germany's Timo Boll in the final.

He qualified for the 2008 Summer Olympics in Beijing, where he competed in the Men's Singles.

At the 2012 Summer Olympics, he was part of the Portuguese men's team.

In 2015 he won first place with his national team (João Geraldo and Marcos Freitas) in table tennis at the 2015 European Games in Baku.
