= 2013 World Table Tennis Championships – Men's singles =

Men's singles at the 2013 World Table Tennis Championships
- Venue: Palais Omnisports de Paris-Bercy
- Location: Paris, France
- Dates: 15–20 May
- Final score: 11–7, 11–8, 6–11, 14–12, 5–11, 11–7

Medalists
gold medal	Zhang Jike	China
silver medal	Wang Hao	China
bronze medal	Xu Xin	China
bronze medal	Ma Long	China

Zhang Jike successfully defended the title by defeating Wang Hao 11–7, 11–8, 6–11, 14–12, 5–11, 11–7 in the final.

== Seeds ==
Singles matches were best of 7 games in qualification matches and best of 7 games in the 128-player sized main draw.

1. (China) Xu Xin (semifinals)
2. (China) Ma Long (semifinals)
3. (China) Wang Hao (final)
4. (China) Zhang Jike (champion)
5. (Germany) Timo Boll (quarterfinals)
6. (Chinese Taipei) Chuang Chih-yuan (fourth round)
7. (Germany) Dimitrij Ovtcharov (fourth round)
8. (China) Ma Lin (second round)
9. (Japan) Jun Mizutani (first round)
10. (Belarus) Vladimir Samsonov (fourth round)
11. (China) Yan An (quarterfinals)
12. (Hong Kong) Jiang Tianyi (first round)
13. (Singapore) Gao Ning (fourth round)
14. (Romania) Adrian Crișan (second round)
15. (Japan) Koki Niwa (fourth round)
16. (Portugal) Marcos Freitas (fourth round)
17. (Germany) Bastian Steger (second round)
18. (France) Adrien Mattenet (second round)
19. (Chinese Taipei) Chen Chien-an (third round)
20. (Germany) Patrick Baum (quarterfinals)
21. (Hong Kong) Tang Peng (third round)
22. (Japan) Taku Takakiwa (second round)
23. (Japan) Seiya Kishikawa (fourth round)
24. (Austria) Robert Gardos (fourth round)
25. (Austria) Chen Weixing (second round)
26. (South Korea) Kim Min-Seok (second round)
27. (China) Fan Zhendong (third round)
28. (Japan) Kazuhiro Chan (third round)
29. (Croatia) Andrej Gaćina (third round)
30. (Portugal) Tiago Apolónia (third round)
31. (North Korea) Kim Hyok-Bong (first round)
32. (South Korea) Jung Young-Sik (second round)
33. (South Korea) Lee Sang-Su (second round)
34. (Austria) Werner Schlager (second round)
35. (Iran) Noshad Alamian (third round)
36. (Russia) Kirill Skachkov (second round)
37. (Slovenia) Bojan Tokič (third round)
38. (Brazil) Cazuo Matsumoto (second round)
39. (Greece) Panagiotis Gionis (second round)
40. (Japan) Kenta Matsudaira (quarterfinals)
41. (South Korea) Seo Hyun-Deok (first round)
42. (Russia) Alexey Smirnov (third round)
43. (Germany) Patrick Franziska (second round)
44. (Portugal) João Monteiro (second round)
45. (South Korea) Cho Eon-Rae (third round)
46. (Hong Kong) Leung Chu Yan (second round)
47. (Sweden) Jens Lundqvist (third round)
48. (Hong Kong) Cheung Yuk (second round)
49. (India) Sharath Kamal (second round)
50. (Greece) Kalinikos Kreanga (third round)
51. (France) Emmanuel Lebesson (third round)
52. (Sweden) Pär Gerell (second round)
53. (Spain) He Zhi Wen (third round)
54. (Egypt) El-sayed Lashin (first round)
55. (Poland) Daniel Gorak (first round)
56. (Brazil) Gustavo Tsuboi (second round)
57. (Austria) Daniel Habesohn (second round)
58. (Turkey) Bora Vang (first round)
59. (Croatia) Zoran Primorac (second round)
60. (Austria) Stefan Fegerl (second round)
61. (Italy) Mihai Bobocica (first round)
62. (France) Damien Éloi (second round)
63. (Hungary) Ádám Pattantyús (second round)
64. (Poland) Wang Zengyi (second round)

== Draw ==
=== Key ===
- Q = Qualifier
- w/o = Walkover
- w/d = Withdraw
- r = Retired
- DQ = Disqualified

=== Finals ===
Quarterfinals
1	(China) Xu Xin	11	9	6	14	11	11
40	(Japan) Kenta Matsudaira	8	11	11	12	5	8
20	(Germany) Patrick Baum	11	6	10	2	3
4	(China) Zhang Jike	9	11	12	11	11
3	(China) Wang Hao	8	11	11	12	11	11
11	(China) Yan An	11	9	6	14	8	2
5	(Germany) Timo Boll	4	9	11	8	11	9
2	(China) Ma Long	11	11	9	11	8	11

Semifinals
1	(China) Xu Xin	8	2	9	10
4	(China) Zhang Jike	11	11	11	12
3	(China) Wang Hao	11	11	11	7	12	11
2	(China) Ma Long	9	7	3	11	14	3

Final
4	(China) Zhang Jike	11	11	6	14	5	11
3	(China) Wang Hao	7	8	11	12	11	7

=== Top half ===
==== Section 1 ====
First Round
1	(China) X Xu	11	11	11	11
(Germany) S Mengel	5	8	2	8
(Dominican Republic) J Lin	8	11	11	9	6	13	9
52	(Sweden) P Gerell	11	6	9	11	11	11	11
62	(France) D Éloi	11	11	12	11	2	5	11
(England) L Pitchford	7	7	14	9	11	11	9
(Slovakia) P Sereda	6	5	8	8
30	(Portugal) T Apolónia	11	11	11	11
28	(Japan) K Chan	11	6	13	11	9	12
(Brazil) H Calderano	9	11	11	5	11	10
(Sweden) K Karlsson	13	11	8	7	8	8
36	(Russia) K Skachkov	11	7	11	11	11	11
54	(Egypt) E-s Lashin	6	8	9	6
(North Korea) H-P Sin	11	11	11	11
(Singapore) Z Yang	11	7	5	9	11	14	6
16	(Portugal) M Freitas	3	11	11	11	8	12	11

Second Round
1	(China) X Xu	11	11	11	11
52	(Sweden) P Gerell	5	3	7	7
62	(France) D Éloi	7	7	4	11	11	5
30	(Portugal) T Apolónia	11	11	11	9	8	11
28	(Japan) K Chan	13	11	11	9	11
36	(Russia) K Skachkov	11	5	7	11	6
(North Korea) H-P Sin	11	11	11	5	9	9	7
16	(Portugal) M Freitas	8	8	9	11	11	11	11

Third Round
1	(China) X Xu	11	11	11	11
30	(Portugal) T Apolónia	8	0	8	7
28	(Japan) K Chan	11	9	7	6	5
16	(Portugal) M Freitas	5	11	11	11	11

Fourth Round
1	(China) X Xu	11	11	11	11
16	(Portugal) M Freitas	7	5	5	7

==== Section 2 ====
First Round
10	(Belarus) V Samsonov	11	11	8	11	11
(Kuwait) I Al-Hasan	9	7	11	9	6
(Hungary) D Kosiba	7	13	7	10	11	9
39	(Greece) P Gionis	11	11	11	12	7	11
57	(Austria) D Habesohn	11	11	5	11	13
(Slovenia) U Slatinsek	8	8	11	4	11
(Chinese Taipei) C-s Lee	9	11	6	2	11
29	(Croatia) A Gaćina	11	9	11	11	13
31	(North Korea) H-B Kim	8	6	8	11	5
(Chinese Taipei) H-c Chiang	11	11	11	8	11
(France) Q Robinot	8	8	10	11	7
33	(South Korea) S-S Lee	11	11	12	8	11
40	(Japan) K Matsudaira	11	11	11	11
(England) D Reed	7	3	7	8
(France) C Legoût	4	8	11	5
8	(China) L Ma	11	11	13	11

Second Round
10	(Belarus) V Samsonov	11	6	11	11	7	11
39	(Greece) P Gionis	7	11	1	5	11	4
57	(Austria) D Habesohn	4	9	9	7
29	(Croatia) A Gaćina	11	11	11	11
(Chinese Taipei) H-c Chiang	3	12	11	6	12	11	11
33	(South Korea) S-S Lee	11	10	9	11	14	7	7
40	(Japan) K Matsudaira	11	11	11	12	11
8	(China) L Ma	5	7	4	14	7

Third Round
10	(Belarus) V Samsonov	11	6	13	11	11
29	(Croatia) A Gaćina	7	11	11	3	9
(Chinese Taipei) H-c Chiang	11	8	6	9	11	4
40	(Japan) K Matsudaira	9	11	11	11	9	11

Fourth Round
10	(Belarus) V Samsonov	11	13	14	8	9	11	8
40	(Japan) K Matsudaira	3	15	12	11	11	3	11

==== Section 3 ====
First Round
7	(Germany) D Ovtcharov	11	11	12	11
(Russia) V Burov	3	2	10	6
(Belgium) R Devos	5	11	6	8	6
59	(Croatia) Z Primorac	11	9	11	11	11
41	(South Korea) H-D Seo	5	3	11	12	10
(France) S Gauzy	11	11	9	14	12
(Czech Republic) L Jančárik	11	6	13	7	6
21	(Hong Kong) P Tang	13	11	11	11	11
20	(Germany) P Baum	11	11	5	13	11	11
(Slovenia) S Lasan	8	4	11	15	8	9
(Belarus) P Platonov	9	11	1	7	12
34	(Austria) W Schlager	11	7	11	11	14
51	(France) E Lebesson	11	13	7	11	11
(Egypt) A Saleh	7	11	11	5	5
(Czech Republic) D Prokopcov	9	11	11	11	7	11
12	(Hong Kong) T Jiang	11	7	8	6	11	9

Second Round
7	(Germany) D Ovtcharov	11	11	11	11
59	(Croatia) Z Primorac	8	6	6	5
(France) S Gauzy	8	11	7	11	11	7
21	(Hong Kong) P Tang	11	9	11	13	6	11
20	(Germany) P Baum	11	11	13	11
34	(Austria) W Schlager	8	6	11	6
51	(France) E Lebesson	16	11	7	11	11
(Czech Republic) D Prokopcov	14	8	11	1	6

Third Round
7	(Germany) D Ovtcharov	9	11	10	11	11	11
21	(Hong Kong) P Tang	11	7	12	3	4	3
20	(Germany) P Baum	11	11	11	13	7	11
51	(France) E Lebesson	13	9	7	11	11	6

Fourth Round
7	(Germany) D Ovtcharov	9	11	10	9	2
20	(Germany) P Baum	11	9	12	11	11

==== Section 4 ====
First Round
14	(Romania) A Crișan	11	11	11	11
(Brazil) T Monteiro	7	8	9	6
(Egypt) O Assar	11	2	3	12	12	11
55	(Poland) D Gorak	7	11	11	10	10	8
58	(Turkey) B Vang	12	11	9	11	11	9	6
(Belgium) J-M Saive	14	4	11	8	7	11	11
(Spain) M Duran	9	7	10	7
24	(Austria) R Gardos	11	11	12	11
27	(China) Z Fan	11	8	11	14	11
(Ukraine) O Didukh	9	11	8	12	9
(Serbia) M Jevtović	13	7	11	9	4	12	9
44	(Portugal) J Monteiro	11	11	9	11	11	10	11
56	(Brazil) G Tsuboi	11	11	11	4	11
(Greece) K Papageorgiou	8	5	6	11	4
(Sweden) F Akerstrom	5	1	10	7
4	(China) J Zhang	11	11	12	11

Second Round
14	(Romania) A Crișan	8	7	11	11	10	11	9
(Egypt) O Assar	11	11	7	3	12	6	11
(Belgium) J-M Saive	6	11	12	5	6
24	(Austria) R Gardos	11	13	10	11	11
27	(China) Z Fan	11	11	7	9	11	7	11
44	(Portugal) J Monteiro	5	4	11	11	9	11	6
56	(Brazil) G Tsuboi	9	15	6	5	7
4	(China) J Zhang	11	13	11	11	11

Third Round
(Egypt) O Assar	11	6	6	16	4	11	7
24	(Austria) R Gardos	7	11	11	14	11	8	11
27	(China) Z Fan	9	8	9	5
4	(China) J Zhang	11	11	11	11

Fourth Round
24	(Austria) R Gardos	6	11	7	5	9
4	(China) J Zhang	11	6	11	11	11

=== Bottom half ===
==== Section 5 ====
First Round
3	(China) H Wang	9	11	11	11	11
(Mexico) M Madrid	11	7	1	9	9
(North Korea) N-C Kim	5	7	11	12	11	9	12
48	(Hong Kong) Y Cheung	11	11	6	10	9	11	14
35	(Iran) N Alamian	11	8	11	6	11	11
(Portugal) A Silva	9	11	8	11	9	7
(Italy) N Stoyanov	11	6	7	11	11	5	6
18	(France) A Mattenet	3	11	11	6	7	11	11
19	(Chinese Taipei) C-a Chen	11	11	11	11
(Slovakia) L Pistej	7	6	4	7
(Romania) O Ionescu	9	10	12	6	3
38	(Brazil) C Matsumoto	11	12	10	11	11
63	(Hungary) A Pattantyús	7	11	12	11	11	11
(Chinese Taipei) S-s Huang	11	4	14	6	9	9
(Scotland) G Rumgay	11	8	6	14	7	7
13	(Singapore) N Gao	9	11	11	12	11	11

Second Round
3	(China) H Wang	11	11	6	11	11
48	(Hong Kong) Y Cheung	5	4	11	4	3
35	(Iran) N Alamian	11	11	11	5	11
18	(France) A Mattenet	7	8	8	11	8
19	(Chinese Taipei) C-a Chen	11	11	11	11
38	(Brazil) C Matsumoto	6	1	8	7
63	(Hungary) A Pattantyús	11	10	8	11	11	7	9
13	(Singapore) N Gao	5	12	11	9	7	11	11

Third Round
3	(China) H Wang	11	11	11	10	11
35	(Iran) N Alamian	7	5	2	12	3
19	(Chinese Taipei) C-a Chen	11	10	6	9
13	(Singapore) N Gao	13	12	11	11

Fourth Round
3	(China) H Wang	8	11	11	11	11
13	(Singapore) N Gao	11	7	7	5	3

==== Section 6 ====
First Round
11	(China) A Yan	11	11	11	12
(Croatia) R Tošić	8	4	5	10
(France) A-K Salifou	8	11	11	11	12	9
46	(Hong Kong) CY Leung	11	9	4	12	14	11
50	(Greece) K Kreanga	18	12	16	11
(Hungary) D Zwickl	16	10	14	2
(England) A Baggaley	11	3	9	6	9
26	(South Korea) M-S Kim	9	11	11	11	11
22	(Japan) T Takakiwa	8	11	13	11	8	6	11
(Slovakia) T Keinath	11	5	11	9	11	11	6
(Latvia) M Burģis	8	7	11	3	11	9
45	(South Korea) E-R Cho	11	11	7	11	6	11
43	(Germany) P Franziska	11	11	8	11	10	11
(Argentina) S Liu	5	7	11	5	12	3
(Cuba) A Pereira	5	6	5	6
6	(Chinese Taipei) C-y Chuang	11	11	11	11

Second Round
11	(China) A Yan	11	11	12	11
46	(Hong Kong) CY Leung	6	9	10	5
50	(Greece) K Kreanga	9	11	9	6	11	14	11
26	(South Korea) M-S Kim	11	6	11	11	8	12	7
22	(Japan) T Takakiwa	12	11	21	11	6	6	8
45	(South Korea) E-R Cho	10	13	19	6	11	11	11
43	(Germany) P Franziska	6	1	9	8
6	(Chinese Taipei) C-y Chuang	11	11	11	11

Third Round
11	(China) A Yan	11	10	11	11	11
50	(Greece) K Kreanga	8	12	3	3	3
45	(South Korea) E-R Cho	6	6	7	12	8
6	(Chinese Taipei) C-y Chuang	11	11	11	10	11

Fourth Round
11	(China) A Yan	11	11	11	11
6	(Chinese Taipei) C-y Chuang	6	6	7	6

==== Section 7 ====
First Round
5	(Germany) T Boll	11	11	11	11
(Bosnia and Herzegovina) A Duranspahic	4	5	5	6
(Spain) C Machado	7	5	11	8	11	9
49	(India) S Kamal	11	11	8	11	5	11
47	(Sweden) J Lundqvist	11	9	10	11	10	11	11
(South Korea) K-M Kim	9	11	12	8	12	8	5
(Croatia) T Kolarek	7	11	2	6	1
32	(South Korea) Y-S Jung	11	7	11	11	11
23	(Japan) S Kishikawa	11	8	12	12	11
(Denmark) J Groth	4	11	10	10	6
(Ukraine) Y Zhmudenko	8	10	9	11	5
60	(Austria) S Fegerl	11	12	11	8	11
42	(Russia) A Smirnov	11	10	12	12	7	11
(Poland) R Floras	5	12	10	10	11	5
(Czech Republic) P Sirucek	6	11	4	11	12	11
9	(Japan) J Mizutani	11	5	11	8	10	8

Second Round
5	(Germany) T Boll	9	12	11	11	11
49	(India) S Kamal	11	10	1	5	2
47	(Sweden) J Lundqvist	12	11	11	2	11	7	11
32	(South Korea) Y-S Jung	14	9	5	11	6	11	8
23	(Japan) S Kishikawa	7	11	11	11	10	11
60	(Austria) S Fegerl	11	8	7	8	12	2
42	(Russia) A Smirnov	12	11	11	11
(Czech Republic) P Sirucek	10	6	7	9

Third Round
5	(Germany) T Boll	11	9	11	9	11	11
47	(Sweden) J Lundqvist	6	11	6	11	4	8
23	(Japan) S Kishikawa	8	11	4	11	11	11
42	(Russia) A Smirnov	11	9	11	8	7	9

Fourth Round
5	(Germany) T Boll	11	11	11	11
23	(Japan) S Kishikawa	6	7	4	3

==== Section 8 ====
First Round
15	(Japan) K Niwa	11	11	11	11
(India) A Amalraj	5	4	8	7
(Russia) M Paykov	11	11	11	11
61	(Italy) M Bobocica	9	9	6	5
53	(Spain) ZW He	11	11	9	11	11
(Russia) G Vlasov	4	9	11	8	2
(Ukraine) L Kou	6	7	8	11	9
25	(Austria) W Chen	11	11	11	6	11
17	(Germany) B Steger	10	11	11	11	11
(Chinese Taipei) C-c Wu	12	9	7	8	4
(Serbia) Ž Pete	9	9	11	4	7
37	(Slovenia) B Tokič	11	11	9	11	11
64	(Poland) Z Wang	11	12	11	12
(Romania) C Cioti	6	10	8	10
(India) S Ghosh	8	4	3	9
2	(China) L Ma	11	11	11	11

Second Round
15	(Japan) K Niwa	8	11	11	7	9	12	11
(Russia) M Paykov	11	6	7	11	11	10	9
53	(Spain) ZW He	11	9	11	7	11	11
25	(Austria) W Chen	3	11	7	11	9	7
17	(Germany) B Steger	8	5	11	11	12	8
37	(Slovenia) B Tokič	11	11	5	9	14	11
64	(Poland) Z Wang	8	2	9	5
2	(China) L Ma	11	11	11	11

Third Round
15	(Japan) K Niwa	11	11	11	7	7	11
53	(Spain) ZW He	2	6	9	11	11	7
37	(Slovenia) B Tokič	6	5	10	8
2	(China) L Ma	11	11	12	11

Fourth Round
15	(Japan) K Niwa	5	11	7	11	4	7
2	(China) L Ma	11	9	11	9	11	11
