= 2011 World Table Tennis Championships – Men's doubles =

Men's doubles at the 2011 World Table Tennis Championships
- Venue: Rotterdam Ahoy
- Location: Rotterdam, Netherlands
- Dates: 10–14 May
- Final score: 11–3, 11–8, 4–11, 11–4, 11–7

Medalists
gold medal	Ma Long; Xu Xin	China
silver medal	Chen Qi; Ma Lin	China
bronze medal	Jeoung Young-sik; Kim Min-seok	South Korea
bronze medal	Wang Hao; Zhang Jike	China

The 2011 World Table Tennis Championships men's doubles was the 51st edition of the men's doubles championship.

Chen Qi and Wang Hao were the defending champions. For this event, Chen partnered Ma Lin while Hao teamed up with Zhang Jike.

Ma Long and Xu Xin, who were runners-up in 2009, won in the final against Chen Qi and Ma Lin 11–3, 11–8, 4–11, 11–4, 11–7.

== Seeds ==
Doubles matches will be best of 5 games in qualification matches and best of 7 games in the 64-player sized main draw.

1. (China) Ma Long / (China) Xu Xin (world champions)
2. (China) Wang Hao / (China) Zhang Jike (semifinals)
3. (China) Chen Qi / (China) Ma Lin (final)
4. (Japan) Seiya Kishikawa / (Japan) Jun Mizutani (third round)
5. (Hong Kong) Jiang Tianyi / (Hong Kong) Tang Peng (second round)
6. (Japan) Kenta Matsudaira / (Japan) Koki Niwa (third round)
7. (South Korea) Lee Jung-Woo / (South Korea) Oh Sang-Eun (quarterfinals)
8. (Hong Kong) Cheung Yuk / (Hong Kong) Li Ching (third round)
9. (Singapore) Gao Ning / (Singapore) Yang Zi (third round)
10. (Germany) Patrick Baum / (Germany) Bastian Steger (quarterfinals)
11. (Poland) Lucjan Blaszczyk / (Poland) Wang Zeng Yi (second round)
12. (South Korea) Ryu Seung-Min / (South Korea) Seo Hyun-Deok (third round)
13. (Germany) Dimitrij Ovtcharov / (Germany) Christian Süß (first round)
14. (Chinese Taipei) Chuang Chih-yuan / (Chinese Taipei) Wu Chih-chi (second round)
15. (Denmark) Jonathan Groth / (Denmark) Kasper Sternberg (second round)
16. (Sweden) Pär Gerell / (Sweden) Jens Lundqvist (third round)
17. (Sweden) Mattias Karlsson / (Sweden) Robert Svensson (second round)
18. (South Korea) Jung Young-Sik / (South Korea) Kim Min-Seok (semifinals)
19. (Ukraine) Lei Kou / (Ukraine) Yevhen Pryshchepa (second round)
20. (France) Emmanuel Lebesson / (France) Adrien Mattenet (second round)
21. (Austria) Robert Gardos / (Austria) Daniel Habesohn (third round)
22. (Portugal) Tiago Apolonia / (Portugal) Joao Monteiro (second round)
23. (Hong Kong) Ko Lai Chak / (Hong Kong) Leung Chu Yan (third round)
24. (Belarus) Pavel Platonov / (Belarus) Vladimir Samsonov (quarterfinals)
25. (India) Achanta Sharath Kamal / (India) Subhajit Saha (first round)
26. (Russia) Kirill Skachkov / (Russia) Alexey Smirnov (second round)
27. (North Korea) Jang Song-Man / (North Korea) Kim Hyok-Bong (first round)
28. (Russia) Fedor Kuzmin / (Russia) Igor Rubtsov (second round)
29. (Czech Republic) Petr Korbel / (Czech Republic) Dmitrij Prokopcov (first round)
30. (Japan) Kazuhiro Chan / (Japan) Kenji Matsudaira (quarterfinals)
31. (Romania) Adrian Crişan / (Romania) Andrei Filimon (first round)
32. (Serbia) Marko Jevtović / (Serbia) Aleksandar Karakašević (second round)

== Draw ==
=== Key ===
- Q = Qualifier
- w/o = Walkover
- w/d = Withdraw
- r = Retired
- DQ = Disqualified

=== Finals ===
Quarterfinals
1	(China) Ma Long (China) Xu Xin	11	11	11	11
10	(Germany) Patrick Baum (Germany) Bastian Steger	3	4	6	5
30	(Japan) Kazuhiro Chan (Japan) Kenji Matsudaira	10	9	4	11	2
18	(South Korea) Jung Young-Sik (South Korea) Kim Min-Seok	12	11	11	9	11
3	(China) Chen Qi (China) Ma Lin	11	11	9	11	6	11
24	(Belarus) Pavel Platonov (Belarus) Vladimir Samsonov	5	3	11	7	11	9
7	(South Korea) Lee Jung-Woo (South Korea) Oh Sang-Eun	7	5	7	8
2	(China) Wang Hao (China) Zhang Jike	11	11	11	11

Semifinals
1	(China) Ma Long (China) Xu Xin	11	11	6	12	11	11
18	(South Korea) Jung Young-Sik (South Korea) Kim Min-Seok	2	4	11	10	13	7
3	(China) Chen Qi (China) Ma Lin	8	11	11	11	9	11
2	(China) Wang Hao (China) Zhang Jike	11	8	4	6	11	8

Final
1	(China) Ma Long (China) Xu Xin	11	11	4	11	11
3	(China) Chen Qi (China) Ma Lin	3	8	11	4	7

=== Top half ===
==== Section 1 ====
First Round
1	(China) Ma Long (China) Xu X	9	11	11	11	11
(Hungary) J Jakab (Hungary) D Kosiba	11	9	2	9	4
(France) C Legout (France) Q Robinot	12	11	11	9	11
27	(North Korea) Jang S-M (North Korea) Kim H-B	10	4	3	11	6
23	(Hong Kong) Ko L C (Hong Kong) Leung C Y	11	11	14	11
(Croatia) Z Primorac (Croatia) R Tosic	4	4	12	5
Q	(Cuba) J Campos (Cuba) A Pereira	5	11	12	5	4
11	(Poland) L Błaszczyk (Poland) Z Y Wang	11	13	10	11	11
10	(Germany) P Baum (Germany) B Steger	11	11	14	12	4	11
(Spain) J Cantero (Spain) Z W He	7	13	12	10	11	4
Q	(Thailand) C Chaitat (Thailand) N Wongsiri	8	5	3	7
19	(Ukraine) L Kou (Ukraine) Y Pryshchepa	11	11	11	11
32	(Serbia) M Jevtović (Serbia) A Karakašević	14	11	10	11	11
(Czech Republic) T Konecny (Czech Republic) P Sirucek	12	9	12	7	5
(Egypt) E-S Lashin (Egypt) A Saleh	9	4	7	11
6	(Japan) Kenta Matsudaira (Japan) K Niwa	11	11	11	13

Second Round
1	(China) Ma Long (China) Xu X	11	11	11	11
(France) C Legout (France) Q Robinot	6	6	8	8
23	(Hong Kong) Ko L C (Hong Kong) Leung C Y	11	11	11	8	11
11	(Poland) L Błaszczyk (Poland) Z Y Wang	7	6	8	11	8
10	(Germany) P Baum (Germany) B Steger	11	9	9	11	11	9	11
19	(Ukraine) L Kou (Ukraine) Y Pryshchepa	8	11	11	3	8	11	6
32	(Serbia) M Jevtović (Serbia) A Karakašević	6	11	10	8	11	6
6	(Japan) Kenta Matsudaira (Japan) K Niwa	11	5	12	11	5	11

Third Round
1	(China) Ma Long (China) Xu X	11	6	11	11	11
23	(Hong Kong) Ko L C (Hong Kong) Leung C Y	7	11	5	7	7
10	(Germany) P Baum (Germany) B Steger	11	11	11	11
6	(Japan) Kenta Matsudaira (Japan) K Niwa	6	6	9	6

Quarterfinals
1	(China) Ma Long (China) Xu X	11	11	11	11
10	(Germany) P Baum (Germany) B Steger	3	4	6	5

==== Section 2 ====
First Round
8	(Hong Kong) Cheung Y (Hong Kong) Li C	11	11	14	11
Q	(Vietnam) Doan K Q (Vietnam) Tran T Q	4	6	12	5
(Ukraine) O Didukh (Ukraine) Y Zhmudenko	9	3	11	9	8
28	(Russia) F Kuzmin (Russia) I Rubtsov	11	11	9	11	11
30	(Japan) K Chan (Japan) Kenji Matsudaira	5	11	9	11	11	11
Q	(Romania) O Ionescu (Romania) H Szocs	11	6	11	7	2	8
Q	(Slovenia) B Roposa (Slovenia) B Tokič	10	14	6	5
15	(Denmark) J Groth (Denmark) K Sternberg	12	16	11	11
14	(Chinese Taipei) Chuang C-Y (Chinese Taipei) Wu C-C	w/o
Q	(Poland) R Floras (Poland) J Kosowski
Q	(Slovakia) M Bardon (Slovakia) L Pistej	6	10	7	11	7
18	(South Korea) Jung Y-S (South Korea) Kim M-S	11	12	11	6	11
17	(Sweden) M Karlsson (Sweden) R Svensson	14	11	11	11
Q	(Austria) S Fegerl (Austria) X Feng	12	7	5	9
(Brazil) T Monteiro (Brazil) G Tsuboi	4	2	1	2
4	(Japan) S Kishikawa (Japan) J Mizutani	11	11	11	11

Second Round
8	(Hong Kong) Cheung Y (Hong Kong) Li C	10	11	11	11	14
28	(Russia) F Kuzmin (Russia) I Rubtsov	12	5	8	9	12
30	(Japan) K Chan (Japan) Kenji Matsudaira	11	11	11	11
15	(Denmark) J Groth (Denmark) K Sternberg	7	4	6	6
14	(Chinese Taipei) Chuang C-Y (Chinese Taipei) Wu C-C	9	3	6	6
18	(South Korea) Jung Y-S (South Korea) Kim M-S	11	11	11	11
17	(Sweden) M Karlsson (Sweden) R Svensson	8	4	5	7
4	(Japan) S Kishikawa (Japan) J Mizutani	11	11	11	11

Third Round
8	(Hong Kong) Cheung Y (Hong Kong) Li C	11	3	11	11	7	9	14
30	(Japan) K Chan (Japan) Kenji Matsudaira	7	11	7	6	11	11	16
18	(South Korea) Jung Y-S (South Korea) Kim M-S	13	11	12	11
4	(Japan) S Kishikawa (Japan) J Mizutani	11	9	10	8

Quarterfinals
30	(Japan) K Chan (Japan) Kenji Matsudaira	10	9	4	11	2
18	(South Korea) Jung Y-S (South Korea) Kim M-S	12	11	11	9	11

=== Bottom half ===
==== Section 3 ====
First Round
3	(China) Chen Q (China) Ma Lin	11	11	12	11
(Greece) P Gionis (Greece) K Papageorgiou	4	5	10	8
(Germany) Z Fejer-Konnerth (Germany) R Filus	11	7	11	11	6	4	11
31	(Romania) A Crişan (Romania) A Filimon	5	11	3	9	11	11	3
26	(Russia) K Skachkov (Russia) A Smirnov	11	10	11	7	12	11
(Chinese Taipei) Chen C-A (Chinese Taipei) Huang S-S	7	12	9	11	10	6
(Russia) V Burov (Russia) A Shibaev	9	11	11	6	3	6
9	(Singapore) Gao N (Singapore) Yang Z	11	4	9	11	11	11
13	(Germany) D Ovtcharov (Germany) C Süß	5	7	5	11	11	3
(Spain) A Carneros (Spain) C Machado	11	11	11	6	7	11
Q	(Portugal) M Freitas (Portugal) A Silva	6	11	12	11	3	4	10
24	(Belarus) P Platonov (Belarus) V Samsonov	11	8	10	7	11	11	12
21	(Austria) R Gardos (Austria) D Habesohn	11
(Belarus) E Chtchetinne (Belarus) V Nekhvedovich	2	r
Q	(Belgium) B Rogiers (Belgium) Y Vostes	3	11	10	10	5
5	(Hong Kong) Jiang T (Hong Kong) Tang P	11	9	12	12	11

Second Round
3	(China) Chen Q (China) Ma Lin	11	11	11	11
(Germany) Z Fejer-Konnerth (Germany) R Filus	3	7	7	5
26	(Russia) K Skachkov (Russia) A Smirnov	11	11	11	8	4	11	4
9	(Singapore) Gao N (Singapore) Yang Z	13	8	6	11	11	7	11
(Spain) A Carneros (Spain) C Machado	4	6	11	3	7
24	(Belarus) P Platonov (Belarus) V Samsonov	11	11	4	11	11
21	(Austria) R Gardos (Austria) D Habesohn	4	8	11	11	11	5	11
5	(Hong Kong) Jiang T (Hong Kong) Tang P	11	11	9	8	6	11	9

Third Round
3	(China) Chen Q (China) Ma Lin	11	11	11	9	11
9	(Singapore) Gao N (Singapore) Yang Z	4	8	1	11	6
24	(Belarus) P Platonov (Belarus) V Samsonov	15	11	11	11
21	(Austria) R Gardos (Austria) D Habesohn	13	8	7	5

Quarterfinals
3	(China) Chen Q (China) Ma Lin	11	11	9	11	6	11
24	(Belarus) P Platonov (Belarus) V Samsonov	5	3	11	7	11	9

==== Section 4 ====
First Round
7	(South Korea) Lee J-W (South Korea) Oh S-E	12	9	11	11	11
Q	(Serbia) B Crepulja (Serbia) Ž Pete	10	11	4	5	4
(Croatia) A Gacina (Croatia) T Kolarek	13	7	8	11	9
22	(Portugal) T Apolonia (Portugal) J Monteiro	15	11	11	9	11
25	(India) Achanta S K (India) S Saha	4	12	13	7	7
(North Korea) Kim N-C (North Korea) Ri C-G	11	10	15	11	11
Q	(Denmark) A Bentsen (Denmark) M Hindersson	4	11	9	9	6
12	(South Korea) Ryu S-M (South Korea) Seo H-D	11	8	11	11	11
16	(Sweden) P Gerell (Sweden) J Lundqvist	11	7	11	4	11	11
Q	(Argentina) G Alto (Argentina) S Liu	8	11	7	11	5	7
Q	(Brazil) H Hoyama (Brazil) C Matsumoto	7	5	6	4
20	(France) E Lebesson (France) A Mattenet	11	11	11	11
29	(Czech Republic) P Korbel (Czech Republic) D Prokopcov	4	5	11	10	11	11	5
Q	(Italy) M Bobocica (Italy) N Stoyanov	11	11	9	12	5	6	11
Q	(India) A Anthony (India) S Roy	11	5	8	5	5
2	(China) Wang H (China) Zhang J	7	11	11	11	11

Second Round
7	(South Korea) Lee J-W (South Korea) Oh S-E	11	11	11	11
22	(Portugal) T Apolonia (Portugal) J Monteiro	6	3	8	9
(North Korea) Kim N-C (North Korea) Ri C-G	11	11	10	6	8	10
12	(South Korea) Ryu S-M (South Korea) Seo H-D	5	9	12	11	11	12
16	(Sweden) P Gerell (Sweden) J Lundqvist	14	9	11	11	11
20	(France) E Lebesson (France) A Mattenet	12	11	7	8	6
Q	(Italy) M Bobocica (Italy) N Stoyanov	4	6	6	8
2	(China) Wang H (China) Zhang J	11	11	11	11

Third Round
7	(South Korea) Lee J-W (South Korea) Oh S-E	11	11	8	12	8	11
12	(South Korea) Ryu S-M (South Korea) Seo H-D	9	6	11	10	11	8
16	(Sweden) P Gerell (Sweden) J Lundqvist	6	11	10	8	3
2	(China) Wang H (China) Zhang J	11	6	12	11	11

Quarterfinals
7	(South Korea) Lee J-W (South Korea) Oh S-E	7	5	7	8
2	(China) Wang H (China) Zhang J	11	11	11	11
