= 2014 World Team Table Tennis Championships – Men's team =

2014 men's team

The men's team tournament of the 2014 World Team Table Tennis Championships was held from 28 April to 5 May 2014. All matches were held at the Yoyogi National Gymnasium and the Tokyo Metropolitan Gymnasium in Tokyo, Japan.

== Medalists ==
Event	Gold	Silver	Bronze
Team	China; Fan Zhendong; Ma Long; Wang Hao; Xu Xin; Zhang Jike	Germany; Timo Boll; Patrick Franziska; Steffen Mengel; Dimitrij Ovtcharov	Chinese Taipei; Chen Chien-an; Chiang Hung-chieh; Chuang Chih-yuan; Huang Sheng-sheng; Wu Chih-chi
Team	China; Fan Zhendong; Ma Long; Wang Hao; Xu Xin; Zhang Jike	Germany; Timo Boll; Patrick Franziska; Steffen Mengel; Dimitrij Ovtcharov	Japan; Seiya Kishikawa; Kenta Matsudaira; Jun Mizutani; Koki Niwa; Masato Shiono

== Championship division ==
The top three teams of each group played for places 1–12.

=== Preliminary round ===
==== Group A ====
Team	Pld	W	L	GW	GL	Pts
China	5	5	0	15	0	10
Austria	5	4	1	12	6	9
Poland	5	3	2	9	8	8
Russia	5	1	4	5	12	6
Brazil	5	1	4	6	14	6
Serbia	5	1	4	5	14	6

28 April 2014; 10:00	Report	Austria	3–1	Serbia
Score by game:
Robert Gardos	3–0	Marko Jevtović
Stefan Fegerl	2–3	Zsolt Peto
Daniel Habesohn	3–2	Aleksandar Karakašević
Robert Gardos	3–0	Zsolt Peto

28 April 2014; 10:00	Report	Russia	0–3	Poland
Score by game:
Alexander Shibaev	2–3	Robert Floras
Alexey Liventsov	0–3	Daniel Górak
Kirill Skachkov	1–3	Wang Zengyi

28 April 2014; 10:00	Report	China	3–0	Brazil
Score by game:
Zhang Jike	3–0	Cazuo Matsumoto
Ma Long	3–0	Hugo Calderano
Xu Xin	3–0	Gustavo Tsuboi

29 April 2014; 13:00	Report	China	3–0	Poland
Score by game:
Fan Zhendong	3–2	Daniel Górak
Zhang Jike	3–0	Robert Floras
Wang Hao	3–0	Paweł Fertikowski

29 April 2014; 13:00	Report	Austria	3–0	Russia
Score by game:
Robert Gardos	3–0	Kirill Skachkov
Stefan Fegerl	3–1	Alexander Shibaev
Chen Weixing	3–0	Grigory Vlasov

29 April 2014; 13:00	Report	Brazil	2–3	Serbia
Score by game:
Cazuo Matsumoto	1–3	Zsolt Peto
Gustavo Tsuboi	3–1	Aleksandar Karakašević
Hugo Calderano	3–1	Marko Jevtović
Cazuo Mattsumoto	0–3	Aleksandar Karakašević
Gustavo Tsuboi	0–3	Pete Zolt
–

30 April 2014; 10:00	Report	China	3–0	Russia
Score by game:
Xu Xin	3–0	Grigory Vlasov
Fan Zhendong	3–0	Alexey Liventsov
Ma Long	3–0	Mikhail Paikov

30 April 2014; 10:00	Report	Austria	3–2	Brazil
Score by game:
Chen Weixing	2–3	Gustavo Tsuboi
Robert Gardos	3–0	Hugo Calderano
Daniel Habesohn	3–1	Thiago Monteiro
Robert Gardos	2–3	Gustavo Tsuboi
Chen Weixing	3–0	Hugo Calderano
–

30 April 2014; 10:00	Report	Poland	3–1	Serbia
Score by game:
Wang Zengyi	3–1	Zsolt Peto
Daniel Górak	3–0	Aleksandar Karakašević
Robert Floras	0–3	Marko Jevtović
Daniel Gorak	3–0	Pete Zolt

30 April 2014; 19:30	Report	China	3–0	Austria
Score by game:
Ma Long	3–0	Robert Gardos
Xu Xin	3–0	Daniel Habesohn
Zhang Jike	3–0	Stefan Fegerl

30 April 2014; 19:30	Report	Russia	3–0	Serbia
Score by game:
Alexander Shibaev	3–1	Zsolt Peto
Mikhail Paikov	3–1	Aleksandar Karakašević
Alexey Liventsov	3–0	Marko Jevtović

30 April 2014; 19:30	Report	Poland	3–1	Brazil
Score by game:
Daniel Górak	3–1	Gustavo Tsuboi
Wang Zengyi	3–2	Hugo Calderano
Robert Floras	1–3	Cazuo Matsumoto
Daniel Górak	3–0	Hugo Calderano

1 May 2014; 13:00	Report	China	3–0	Serbia
Score by game:
Ma Long	3–0	Marko Jevtović
Wang Hao	3–0	Bojan Crepulja
Xu Xin	3–0	Zsolt Peto

1 May 2014; 13:00	Report	Austria	3–0	Poland
Score by game:
Stefan Fegerl	3–0	Wang Zengyi
Robert Gardos	3–0	Daniel Górak
Chen Weixing	3–0	Paweł Fertikowski

1 May 2014; 13:00	Report	Russia	2–3	Brazil
Score by game:
Mikhail Paikov	2–3	Gustavo Tsuboi
Alexander Shibaev	2–3	Cazuo Matsumoto
Alexey Liventsov	3–0	Thiago Monteiro
Alexander Shibaev	3–0	Gustavo Tsuboi
Mikhail Paikov	1–3	Cazuo Matsumoto
–

==== Group B ====
Team	Pld	W	L	GW	GL	Pts
Germany	5	5	0	15	2	10
Singapore	5	3	2	11	9	8
Croatia	5	3	2	10	9	8
Hong Kong	5	2	3	8	10	7
Ukraine	5	1	4	7	12	6
Denmark	5	1	4	5	14	6

28 April 2014; 10:00	Report	Germany	3–0	Singapore
Score by game:
Timo Boll	3–1	Gao Ning
Dimitrij Ovtcharov	3–0	Yang Zi
Steffen Mengel	3–1	Chew Zhe Yu Clarence

28 April 2014; 10:00	Report	Hong Kong	3–0	Ukraine
Score by game:
Jiang Tianyi	3–2	Kou Lei
Tang Peng	3–0	Oleksandr Didukh
Wong Chun Ting	3–0	Ivan Katkov

28 April 2014; 10:00	Report	Croatia	3–1	Denmark
Score by game:
Andrej Gaćina	3–0	Michael Maze
Tan Ruiwu	3–2	Jonathan Groth
Tomislav Kolarek	0–3	Kasper Sternberg
Tan Ruiwu	3–2	Michael Maze

29 April 2014; 16:30	Report	Germany	3–0	Denmark
Score by game:
Dimitrij Ovtcharov	3–1	Jonathan Groth
Timo Boll	3–1	Mikkel Hindersson
Patrick Franziska	3–0	Morten Rasmussen

29 April 2014; 16:30	Report	Hong Kong	1–3	Croatia
Score by game:
Tang Peng	3–0	Tan Ruiwu
Jiang Tianyi	1–3	Andrej Gaćina
Wong Chun Ting	2–3	Tomislav Kolarek
Tang Peng	0–3	Andrej Gaćina

29 April 2014; 16:30	Report	Singapore	3–1	Ukraine
Score by game:
Gao Ning	3–0	Ivan Katkov
Yang Zi	0–3	Kou Lei
Chew Zhe Yu Clarence	3–2	Yevhen Pryshchepa
Gao Ning	3–1	Kou Lei

30 April 2014; 10:00	Report	Germany	3–0	Croatia
Score by game:
Dimitrij Ovtcharov	3–0	Tan Ruiwu
Timo Boll	3–1	Andrej Gaćina
Patrick Franziska	3–0	Tomislav Kolarek

30 April 2014; 10:00	Report	Hong Kong	1–3	Singapore
Score by game:
Jiang Tianyi	1–3	Gao Ning
Tang Peng	3–0	Yang Zi
Wong Chun Ting	2–3	Chew Zhe Yu Clarence
Tang Peng	1–3	Gao Ning

30 April 2014; 10:00	Report	Denmark	0–3	Ukraine
Score by game:
Kasper Sternberg	1–3	Kou Lei
Jonathan Groth	0–3	Ivan Katkov
Morten Rasmussen	0–3	Oleksandr Didukh

30 April 2014; 19:30	Report	Germany	3–0	Hong Kong
Score by game:
Timo Boll	3–0	Wong Chun Ting
Dimitrij Ovtcharov	3–0	Cheung Yuk
Patrick Franziska	3–0	Leung Chu Yan

30 April 2014; 19:30	Report	Croatia	3–1	Ukraine
Score by game:
Andrej Gaćina	3–2	Oleksandr Didukh
Tan Ruiwu	2–3	Kou Lei
Tomislav Kolarek	3–0	Ivan Katkov
Andrej Gaćina	3–1	Kou Lei

30 April 2014; 19:30	Report	Singapore	2–3	Denmark
Score by game:
Gao Ning	3–1	Kasper Sternberg
Chew Zhe Yu Clarence	0–3	Michael Maze
Yang Zi	0–3	Jonathan Groth
Gao Ning	3–0	Michael Maze
Chew Zhe Yu Clarence	0–3	Kasper Sternberg
–

1 May 2014; 13:00	Report	Germany	3–2	Ukraine
Score by game:
Steffen Mengel	3–2	Ivan Katkov
Patrick Franziska	3–1	Kou Lei
Dimitrij Ovtcharov	2–3	Oleksandr Didukh
Steffen Mengel	2–3	Kou Lei
Patrick Franziska	3–1	Ivan Katkov
–

1 May 2014; 13:00	Report	Hong Kong	3–1	Denmark
Score by game:
Jiang Tianyi	1–3	Kasper Sternberg
Tang Peng	3–0	Michael Maze
Wong Chun Ting	3–0	Jonathan Groth
Jiang Tianyi	3–1	Michael Maze

1 May 2014; 13:00	Report	Croatia	1–3	Singapore
Score by game:
Andrej Gaćina	3–0	Chew Zhe Yu Clarence
Tomislav Kolarek	2–3	Gao Ning
Tan Ruiwu	1–3	Yang Zi
Andrej Gaćina	2–3	Gao Ning

==== Group C ====
Team	Pld	W	L	GW	GL	Pts
Japan	5	4	1	14	6	9
Portugal	5	3	2	12	8	8
Greece	5	3	2	12	10	8
France	5	2	3	8	10	7
Romania	5	2	3	7	12	7
Hungary	5	1	4	7	14	6

28 April 2014; 16:30	Report	Japan	2–3	Greece
Score by game:
Jun Mizutani	3–2	Kalinikos Kreanga
Seiya Kishikawa	2–3	Panagiotis Gionis
Kenta Matsudaira	2–3	Konstantinos Papageorgiou
Jun Mizutani	3–1	Panagiotis Gionis
Seiya Kishikawa	0–3	Kalinikos Kreanga
–

28 April 2014; 16:30	Report	Portugal	3–0	Hungary
Score by game:
Marcos Freitas	3–0	Daniel Kosiba
Tiago Apolónia	3–1	Ádám Pattantyús
João Monteiro	3–0	János Jakab

28 April 2014; 16:30	Report	France	3–0	Romania
Score by game:
Simon Gauzy	3–0	Hunor Szőcs
Adrien Mattenet	3–0	Ovidiu Ionescu
Emmanuel Lebesson	3–1	Andrei Filimon

29 April 2014; 16:30	Report	Japan	3–0	Romania
Score by game:
Koki Niwa	3–1	Ovidiu Ionescu
Jun Mizutani	3–1	Alexandru Cazacu
Kenta Matsudaira	3–1	Hunor Szőcs

29 April 2014; 16:30	Report	Portugal	3–1	France
Score by game:
Marcos Freitas	3–1	Simon Gauzy
Tiago Apolónia	3–2	Adrien Mattenet
João Monteiro	1–3	Emmanuel Lebesson
Marcos Freitas	3–0	Adrien Mattenet

29 April 2014; 16:30	Report	Greece	2–3	Hungary
Score by game:
Panagiotis Gionis	3–0	János Jakab
Kalinikos Kreanga	3–0	Ádám Pattantyús
Konstantinos Lagogiannis	1–3	Daniel Kosiba
Panagiotis Gionis	0–3	Ádám Pattantyús
Kalinikos Kreanga	1–3	János Jakab
–

30 April 2014; 13:00	Report	Japan	3–0	France
Score by game:
Koki Niwa	3–2	Tristan Flore
Jun Mizutani	3–2	Emmanuel Lebesson
Kenta Matsudaira	3–2	Simon Gauzy

30 April 2014; 13:00	Report	Portugal	3–1	Greece
Score by game:
Marcos Freitas	3–1	Kalinikos Kreanga
Tiago Apolónia	0–3	Panagiotis Gionis
João Monteiro	3–0	Konstantinos Papageorgiou
Marcos Freitas	3–2	Panagiotis Gionis

30 April 2014; 13:00	Report	Romania	3–1	Hungary
Score by game:
Andrei Filimon	3–0	Ádám Pattantyús
Ovidiu Ionescu	3–1	János Jakab
Hunor Szőcs	0–3	Daniel Kosiba
Ovidiu Ionescu	3–0	Ádám Pattantyús

30 April 2014; 19:30	Report	Japan	3–1	Portugal
Score by game:
Jun Mizutani	3–0	Tiago Apolónia
Koki Niwa	3–2	Marcos Freitas
Kenta Matsudaira	2–3	João Monteiro
Jun Mizutani	3–2	Marcos Freitas

30 April 2014; 19:30	Report	France	3–1	Hungary
Score by game:
Emmanuel Lebesson	3–0	Ádám Pattantyús
Simon Gauzy	0–3	Daniel Kosiba
Adrien Mattenet	3–0	Tamas Lakatos
Simon Gauzy	3–0	Ádám Pattantyús

30 April 2014; 19:30	Report	Greece	3–1	Romania
Score by game:
Kalinikos Kreanga	3–2	Ovidiu Ionescu
Panagiotis Gionis	3–0	Hunor Szőcs
Konstantinos Papageorgiou	1–3	Andrei Filimon
Panagiotis Gionis	3–2	Ovidiu Ionescu

1 May 2014; 16:30	Report	Japan	3–2	Hungary
Score by game:
Jun Mizutani	3–0	Ádám Pattantyús
Seiya Kishikawa	0–3	Daniel Kosiba
Masato Shiono	3–0	Tamas Lakatos
Seiya Kishikawa	1–3	Ádám Pattantyús
Jun Mizutani	3–0	Daniel Kosiba
–

1 May 2014; 16:30	Report	Portugal	2–3	Romania
Score by game:
Diogo Carvalho	0–3	Hunor Szőcs
André Silva	1–3	Alexandru Cazacu
João Monteiro	3–1	Lucian Munteanu
André Silva	3–2	Hunor Szőcs
Diogo Carvalho	1–3	Alexandru Cazacu
–

1 May 2014; 16:30	Report	France	1–3	Greece
Score by game:
Adrien Mattenet	3–1	Kalinikos Kreanga
Emmanuel Lebesson	0–3	Panagiotis Gionis
Tristan Flore	2–3	Konstantinos Papageorgiou
Adrien Mattenet	1–3	Panagiotis Gionis

==== Group D ====
Team	Pld	W	L	GW	GL	Pts
South Korea	5	4	1	14	8	9
Chinese Taipei	5	4	1	13	5	9
Sweden	5	3	2	11	9	8
North Korea	5	3	2	10	10	8
Belarus	5	1	4	7	13	6
Spain	5	0	5	3	15	5

28 April 2014; 16:30	Report	South Korea	3–2	Belarus
Score by game:
Kim Min-Seok	3–2	Pavel Platonov
Jung Young-Sik	2–3	Vladimir Samsonov
Joo Se-Hyuk	3–0	Aliaksandr Khanin
Kim Min-Seok	0–3	Vladimir Samsonov
Jung Young-Sik	3–0	Pavel Platonov
–

28 April 2014; 16:30	Report	Chinese Taipei	3–1	North Korea
Score by game:
Chen Chien-an	2–3	Kim Hyok-Bong
Chuang Chih-yuan	3–0	Kim Nam-Chol
Chiang Hung-chieh	3–1	Choe Il
Chuang Chih-yuan	3–0	Kim Hyok-Bong

28 April 2014; 16:30	Report	Sweden	3–0	Spain
Score by game:
Pär Gerell	3–1	Marc Duran
Jens Lundqvist	3–2	Álvaro Robles
Kristian Karlsson	3–1	Endika Díez

29 April 2014; 10:00	Report	South Korea	3–0	Spain
Score by game:
Joo Se-Hyuk	3–1	Álvaro Robles
Cho Eon-Rae	3–0	Marc Duran
Seo Hyun-Deok	3–0	Carlos Franco

29 April 2014; 10:00	Report	Chinese Taipei	3–1	Sweden
Score by game:
Chuang Chih-yuan	3–1	Pär Gerell
Chen Chien-an	3–2	Kristian Karlsson
Chiang Hung-chieh	0–3	Jens Lundqvist
Chuang Chih-yuan	3–0	Kristian Karlsson

29 April 2014; 10:00	Report	Belarus	0–3	North Korea
Score by game:
Vladimir Samsonov	1–3	Kim Nam-Chol
Pavel Platonov	2–3	Kim Hyok-Bong
Aliaksandr Khanin	2–3	Choe Il

30 April 2014; 10:00	Report	South Korea	3–2	Sweden
Score by game:
Cho Eon-Rae	1–3	Jens Lundqvist
Joo Se-Hyuk	3–1	Pär Gerell
Kim Min-Seok	1–3	Jon Persson
Joo Se-Hyuk	3–0	Jens Lundqvist
Cho Eon-Rae	3–1	Pär Gerell
–

30 April 2014; 10:00	Report	Chinese Taipei	3–0	Belarus
Score by game:
Chen Chien-an	3–0	Vadim Yarashenka
Chuang Chih-yuan	3–2	Vladimir Samsonov
Huang Sheng-sheng	3–0	Pavel Platonov

30 April 2014; 10:00	Report	Spain	2–3	North Korea
Score by game:
Álvaro Robles	2–3	Kim Hyok-Bong
Marc Duran	2–3	Kim Nam-Chol
Endika Díez	3–0	Choe Il
Marc Duran	3–1	Kim Hyok-Bong
Álvaro Robles	3–0	Kim Nam-Chol
–

30 April 2014; 16:30	Report	South Korea	3–1	Chinese Taipei
Score by game:
Joo Se-Hyuk	3–0	Chen Chien-an
Jung Young-Sik	0–3	Chuang Chih-yuan
Cho Eon-Rae	3–2	Chiang Hung-chieh
Joo Se-Hyuk	3–1	Chuang Chih-yuan

30 April 2014; 16:30	Report	Sweden	3–0	North Korea
Score by game:
Kristian Karlsson	3–2	Kim Hyok-Bong
Jens Lundqvist	3–1	Kim Nam-Chol
Pär Gerell	3–2	Choe Il

30 April 2014; 16:30	Report	Belarus	3–1	Spain
Score by game:
Pavel Platonov	2–3	Álvaro Robles
Vladimir Samsonov	3–1	Marc Duran
Aliaksandr Khanin	3–2	Endika Díez
Vladimir Samsonov	3–0	Álvaro Robles

1 May 2014; 16:30	Report	South Korea	2–3	North Korea
Score by game:
Jung Young-Sik	3–1	Kim Nam-Chol
Cho Eon-Rae	3–1	Kim Hyok-Bong
Joo Se-Hyuk	2–3	Choe Il
Jung Young-Sik	1–3	Kim Hyok-Bong
Cho Eon-Rae	1–3	Kim Nam-Chol
–

1 May 2014; 16:30	Report	Chinese Taipei	3–0	Spain
Score by game:
Chen Chien-an	3–0	Álvaro Robles
Huang Sheng-sheng	3–0	Marc Duran
Wu Chih-chi	3–0	Carlos Franco

1 May 2014; 16:30	Report	Sweden	3–2	Belarus
Score by game:
Jens Lundqvist	3–0	Vadim Yarashenka
Kristian Karlsson	2–3	Pavel Platonov
Pär Gerell	3–1	Aliaksandr Khanin
Jens Lundqvist	1–3	Pavel Platonov
Kristian Karlsson	3–0	Vadim Yarashenka
–

=== Knockout stage ===
==== Places 1–12 ====
First round
Greece	1
Austria	3
Chinese Taipei	3
Croatia	1
Poland	1
Portugal	3
Singapore	3
Sweden	1

Quarter-finals
China	3
Austria	0
Chinese Taipei	3
South Korea	2
Japan	3
Portugal	0
Singapore	0
Germany	3

Semi-finals
China	3
Chinese Taipei	0
Japan	1
Germany	3

Final
China	3
Germany	1

===== Round of 16 =====
2 May 2014; 10:00	Report	Austria	3–1	Greece
Score by game:
Robert Gardos	3–1	Kalinikos Kreanga
Daniel Habesohn	1–3	Konstantinos Papageorgiou
Stefan Fegerl	3–0	Anastasios Riniotis
Robert Gardos	3–0	Konstantinos Papageorgiou

2 May 2014; 10:00	Report	Chinese Taipei	3–1	Croatia
Score by game:
Chen Chien-an	2–3	Andrej Gaćina
Chuang Chih-yuan	3–2	Tomislav Kolarek
Huang Sheng-sheng	3–1	Tan Ruiwu
Chuang Chih-yuan	3–0	Andrej Gaćina

2 May 2014; 10:00	Report	Poland	1–3	Portugal
Score by game:
Wang Zengyi	3–0	Tiago Apolónia
Daniel Gorak	0–3	Marcos Freitas
Robert Floras	0–3	João Monteiro
Wang Zengyi	1–3	Marcos Freitas

2 May 2014; 16:30	Report	Singapore	3–1	Sweden
Score by game:
Gao Ning	3–2	Kristian Karlsson
Yang Zi	1–3	Jens Lundqvist
Chew Zhe Yu Clarence	3–0	Pär Gerell
Gao Ning	3–0	Jens Lundqvist

===== Quarterfinals =====
2 May 2014; 19:30	Report	China	3–0	Austria
Score by game:
Ma Long	3–0	Daniel Habesohn
Zhang Jike	3–2	Robert Gardos
Xu Xin	3–0	Stefan Fegerl

2 May 2014; 19:30	Report	Japan	3–0	Portugal
Score by game:
Koki Niwa	3–0	Marcos Freitas
Jun Mizutani	3–0	Tiago Apolónia
Kenta Matsudaira	3–1	João Monteiro

3 May 2014; 13:00	Report	Chinese Taipei	3–2	South Korea
Score by game:
Chen Chien-an	2–3	Joo Se-Hyuk
Chuang Chih-yuan	3–1	Jung Young-Sik
Chiang Hung-chieh	1–3	Cho Eon-Rae
Chuang Chih-yuan	3–2	Joo Se-Hyuk
Chen Chien-an	3–1	Jung Young-Sik
–

2 May 2014; 19:30	Report	Singapore	0–3	Germany
Score by game:
Chew Zhe Yu Clarence	0–3	Dimitrij Ovtcharov
Gao Ning	0–3	Timo Boll
Pang Xue Jie	1–3	Patrick Franziska

===== Semifinals =====
4 May 2014; 10:00	Report	China	3–0	Chinese Taipei
Score by game:
Xu Xin	3–0	Chen Chien-an
Ma Long	3–0	Chuang Chih-yuan
Zhang Jike	3–1	Huang Sheng-sheng

4 May 2014; 16:30	Report	Japan	1–3	Germany
Score by game:
Koki Niwa	1–3	Timo Boll
Jun Mizutani	3–2	Dimitrij Ovtcharov
Kenta Matsudaira	2–3	Patrick Franziska
Jun Mizutani	0–3	Timo Boll

===== Final =====
5 May 2014; 16:30	Report	China	3–1	Germany
Score by game:
Ma Long	3–0	Timo Boll
Zhang Jike	0–3	Dimitrij Ovtcharov
Xu Xin	3–0	Patrick Franziska
Ma Long	3–0	Dimitrij Ovtcharov

==== Places 13–24 ====
First Round
Hungary	2
Ukraine	3
Brazil	3
Denmark	0
Spain	3
Romania	2
Belarus	0
Serbia	3

Second Round
Hong Kong	1
Ukraine	3
Brazil	1
France	3
North Korea	3
Spain	0
Serbia	1
Russia	3

Third Round
Ukraine	0
France	3
North Korea	2
Russia	3

Position 13
France	X
Russia	X

== Second division ==
The top three teams of each group played for places 25–36.

=== Preliminary round ===
==== Group E ====
Team	Pld	W	L	GW	GL	Pts
Czech Republic	5	5	0	15	0	10
Nigeria	5	4	1	12	6	9
Belgium	5	3	2	10	10	8
Canada	5	2	3	8	12	7
Indonesia	5	1	5	5	14	6
Bosnia and Herzegovina	5	0	5	7	15	5

	BEL	BIH	CAN	CZE	INA	NGA
Belgium		3–2	3–1	0–3	3–1	1–3
Bosnia and Herzegovina	2–3		2–3	0–3	2–3	1–3
Canada	1–3	3–2		0–3	3–1	1–3
Czech Republic	3–0	3–0	3–0		3–0	3–0
Indonesia	1–3	3–2	1–3	0–3		0–3
Nigeria	3–1	3–1	3–1	0–3	3–0	

==== Group F ====
Team	Pld	W	L	GW	GL	Pts
India	5	4	1	14	5	9
Italy	5	4	1	14	5	9
Iran	5	4	1	14	6	9
Argentina	5	2	3	6	11	7
Australia	5	1	4	4	13	6
Paraguay	5	0	5	3	15	5

	ARG	AUS	IND	IRN	ITA	PAR
Argentina		3–0	0–3	0–3	0–3	3–2
Australia	0–3		0–3	1–3	0–3	3–1
India	3–0	3–0		3–2	2–3	3–0
Iran	3–0	3–1	2–3		3–2	3–0
Italy	3–0	3–0	3–2	2–3		3–0
Paraguay	2–3	1–3	0–3	0–3	0–3	

==== Group G ====
Team	Pld	W	L	GW	GL	Pts
England	5	5	0	15	1	10
Slovakia	5	4	1	12	7	9
Turkey	5	3	2	11	10	8
Thailand	5	1	4	6	12	6
Republic of the Congo	5	1	4	5	13	6
Israel	5	1	4	6	12	6

	CGO	ENG	ISR	SVK	THA	TUR
Republic of the Congo		0–3	3–1	1–3	0–3	1–3
England	3–0		3–0	3–1	3–0	3–0
Israel	1–3	1–3		0–3	3–0	1–3
Slovakia	3–1	0–3	3–0		3–1	3–2
Thailand	3–0	0–3	0–3	1–3		2–3
Turkey	3–1	0–3	3–1	2–3	3–2	

==== Group H ====
Team	Pld	W	L	GW	GL	Pts
Slovenia	5	5	0	15	5	10
Egypt	5	4	1	13	3	9
Norway	5	2	3	10	11	8
Bulgaria	5	2	3	9	10	7
Vietnam	5	1	4	7	13	6
Dominican Republic	5	0	5	3	15	5

	BUL	DOM	EGY	NOR	SVN	VIE
Bulgaria		3–0	0–3	2–3	1–3	3–1
Dominican Republic	0–3		0–3	1–3	1–3	1–3
Egypt	3–0	3-0		3–0	1–3	3–0
Norway	3–2	3–1	0–3		1–3	3–2
Slovenia	3–1	3–1	3–1	3–1		3–1
Vietnam	0–3	3–1	0–3	2–3	1–3	

=== Knockout stage ===
==== Places 25–36 ====
First Round
India	0
Egypt	3
Italy	3
Belgium	0
Turkey	0
Nigeria	3
Slovakia	3
Norway	0

Second Round
Czech Republic	3
Egypt	1
Italy	3
Slovenia	1
England	3
Nigeria	2
Slovakia	3
Iran	1

Third Round
Czech Republic	0
Italy	3
England	3
Slovakia	2

Position 25
Italy	1
England	3

==== Places 37–48 ====
First Round
Bosnia and Herzegovina	3
Vietnam	1
Indonesia	3
Republic of the Congo	2
Paraguay	3
Thailand	1
Australia	3
Dominican Republic	0

Second Round
Israel	3
Bosnia and Herzegovina	0
Indonesia	1
Argentina	3
Bulgaria	3
Paraguay	0
Australia	2
Canada	3

Third Round
Israel	1
Argentina	3
Bulgaria	3
Canada	1

Position 37
Argentina	X
Bulgaria	X

== Third division ==
The top three teams of each group played for places 49–60.

=== Preliminary round ===
==== Group I ====
Team	Pld	W	L	GW	GL	Pts
Estonia	5	4	1	14	5	9
Saudi Arabia	5	4	1	14	7	9
Puerto Rico	5	4	1	12	6	9
Malaysia	5	2	3	10	11	7
Qatar	5	1	4	3	14	6
Wales	5	0	5	5	15	5

	EST	MAS	PUR	QAT	KSA	WAL
Estonia		3–2	3–0	3–0	2–3	3–0
Malaysia	2–3		0–3	3–0	2–3	3–2
Puerto Rico	0–3	3–0		3–0	3–2	3–1
Qatar	0–3	0–3	0–3		0–3	3–2
Saudi Arabia	3–2	3–2	2–3	3–0		3–0
Wales	0–3	2–3	1–3	2–3	0–3	

==== Group J ====
Team	Pld	W	L	GW	GL	Pts
United States	5	5	0	15	6	10
Kazakhstan	5	3	2	13	7	8
Scotland	5	3	2	11	8	8
Ecuador	5	3	2	12	9	8
Luxembourg	5	1	4	5	14	6
Moldova	5	0	5	3	15	5

	ECU	KAZ	LUX	MDA	SCO	USA
Ecuador		3–2	3–1	3–0	1–3	2–3
Kazakhstan	2–3		3–0	3–0	3–1	2–3
Luxembourg	1–3	0–3		3–2	0–3	1–3
Moldova	0–3	0–3	2–3		1–3	0–3
Scotland	3–1	1–3	3–0	3–1		1–3
United States	3–2	3–2	3–1	3–0	3–1	

==== Group K ====
Team	Pld	W	L	GW	GL	Pts
Mexico	5	5	0	15	1	10
Ireland	5	3	2	9	8	8
Latvia	5	3	2	10	10	8
New Zealand	5	2	3	8	13	7
Guatemala	5	2	3	11	9	7
Kuwait	5	0	5	3	15	5

	GUA	IRL	KUW	LAT	MEX	NZL
Guatemala		3–0	3–0	2–3	1–3	2–3
Ireland	0–3		3–1	3–1	0-3	3–0
Kuwait	0–3	1–3		0–3	0–3	2–3
Latvia	3–2	1–3	3–0		0–3	3–2
Mexico	3–1	3–0	3–0	3–0		3–0
New Zealand	3–2	0–3	3–2	2–3	0–3	

==== Group L ====
Team	Pld	W	L	GW	GL	Pts
Switzerland	5	5	0	15	3	10
Finland	5	4	1	14	7	9
Lithuania	5	3	2	10	9	8
Cyprus	5	2	3	9	10	7
United Arab Emirates	5	1	4	5	12	6
Pakistan	5	0	5	3	15	5

	CYP	FIN	LTU	PAK	SUI	UAE
Cyprus		1–3	2–3	3–1	0–3	3–0
Finland	3–1		3–1	3–0	2–3	3–2
Lithuania	3–2	1–3		3–1	0–3	3–0
Pakistan	1–3	0–3	1–3		1–3	0–3
Switzerland	3–0	3–2	3–0	3–1		3–0
United Arab Emirates	0–3	2–3	0–3	3–0	0–3	

=== Knockout stage ===
==== Places 49–60 ====
First Round
Latvia	0
Kazakhstan	3
Finland	1
Scotland	3
Puerto Rico	3
Ireland	1
Saudi Arabia	3
Lithuania	1

Second Round
Estonia	2
Kazakhstan	3
Scotland	1
Mexico	3
Switzerland	1
Puerto Rico	3
Saudi Arabia	3
United States	2

Third Round
Kazakhstan	2
Mexico	3
Puerto Rico	3
Saudi Arabia	1

Position 49
Mexico	2
Puerto Rico	3

Position 57–60		Position 57
Latvia	3
Finland	1	Latvia	X
Ireland	2	Lithuania	X
Lithuania	3

==== Places 61–72 ====
First Round
Moldova	2
Qatar	3
Luxembourg	3
Pakistan	1
Wales	3
Guatemala	1
United Arab Emirates	3
Kuwait	2

Second Round
New Zealand	3
Qatar	2
Luxembourg	1
Malaysia	3
Cyprus	3
Wales	1
United Arab Emirates	0
Ecuador	3

Third Round
New Zealand	1
Malaysia	3
Cyprus	3
Ecuador	1

Position 61
Malaysia	X
Cyprus	X

Position 69–72		Position 69
Moldova	1
Pakistan	3	Pakistan	X
Guatemala	3	Guatemala	X
Kuwait	0

== Fourth division ==
The top three teams of each group played for places 73–84.

=== Preliminary round ===
==== Group M ====
Team	Pld	W	L	GW	GL	Pts
Yemen	5	5	0	15	4	10
Togo	5	3	2	13	7	8
Sri Lanka	5	3	2	12	7	8
Kyrgyzstan	5	3	2	10	8	8
Iceland	5	1	4	3	14	6
Morocco	5	0	5	2	15	5

	ISL	KGZ	MAR	SRI	TOG	YEM
Iceland		0–3	3–2	0–3	0–3	0–3
Kyrgyzstan	3–0		3–0	1–3	3–2	0–3
Morocco	2–3	0–3		0–3	0–3	0–3
Sri Lanka	3–0	3–1	3–0		1–3	2–3
Togo	3–0	2–3	3–0	3–1		2–3
Yemen	3–0	3–0	3–0	3–2	3–2	

==== Group N ====
Team	Pld	W	L	GW	GL	Pts
Philippines	5	5	0	15	3	10
Peru	5	4	1	13	8	9
Bahrain	5	3	2	11	8	8
Mongolia	5	2	3	6	11	7
Angola	5	1	4	6	12	6
Mauritius	5	0	5	3	15	5

	ANG	BHR	MRI	MGL	PER	PHI
Angola		0–3	3–0	1–3	2–3	0–3
Bahrain	3–0		3–0	3–2	1–3	1–3
Mauritius	0–3	0–3		1–3	1–3	1–3
Mongolia	3–1	2–3	3–1		1–3	0–3
Peru	3–2	3–1	3–1	3–1		1–3
Philippines	3–0	3–1	3–1	3–0	3–1	

==== Group O ====
Team	Pld	W	L	GW	GL	Pts
Uzbekistan	5	5	0	15	1	10
Laos	5	3	2	12	10	8
San Marino	5	3	2	11	8	8
Kosovo	5	3	2	10	11	8
Costa Rica	5	1	4	7	12	6
New Caledonia	5	0	5	2	15	5

	CRC	KOS	LAO	NCL	SMR	UZB
Costa Rica		2–3	2–3	3–0	0–3	0–3
Kosovo	3–2		1–3	3–1	3–2	0–3
Laos	3–2	3–1		3–1	2–3	1–3
New Caledonia	0–3	1–3	1–3		0–3	0–3
San Marino	3–0	2–3	3–2	3–0		0–3
Uzbekistan	3–0	3–0	3–1	3–0	3–0	

==== Group P ====
Team	Pld	W	L	GW	GL	Pts
Montenegro	5	5	0	15	3	10
Syria	5	4	1	13	6	9
Macau	5	3	2	12	10	8
Uruguay	5	2	3	8	10	7
Azerbaijan	5	1	4	8	12	6
Algeria	0	0	5	0	15	0

	ALG	AZE	MAC	MNE	SYR	URU
Algeria		0–3	0–3	0–3	0–3	0–3
Azerbaijan	3–0		2–3	1–3	1–3	1–3
Macau	3–0	3–2		3–1	2–3	3–2
Montenegro	3–0	3–1	1–3		3–1	3–0
Syria	3–0	3–1	3–2	1–3		3–0
Uruguay	3–0	3–1	2–3	0–3	0–3	

=== Knockout stage ===
==== Places 73–84 ====
First Round
Macau	2
Peru	3
Togo	3
San Marino	0
Bahrain	3
Syria	1
Laos	0
Sri Lanka	3

Second Round
Yemen	2
Peru	3
Togo	2
Montenegro	3
Uzbekistan	3
Bahrain	1
Sri Lanka	3
Philippines	2

Third Round
Peru	2
Montenegro	3
Uzbekistan	0
Sri Lanka	3

Position 73
Montenegro	3
Sri Lanka	2

Position 81–84		Position 81
Macau	3
San Marino	1	Macau	X
Syria	3	Syria	X
Laos	0

==== Places 85–96 ====
First Round
Costa Rica	3
Morocco	0
Mauritius	3
Iceland	1
Azerbaijan	3
New Caledonia	0

Second Round
Kyrgyzstan	2
Angola	3
Costa Rica	0
Uruguay	3
Kosovo	1
Mauritius	3
Azerbaijan	1
Mongolia	3

Third Round
Angola	0
Uruguay	3
Mauritius	0
Mongolia	3

Position 85
Uruguay	X
Mongolia	X

Position 93–96		Position 93
		Morocco	X
Iceland	3	Iceland	X
New Caledonia	0

== Fifth division ==
The top three teams of each group played for places 97–105.

=== Preliminary round ===
==== Group Q ====
Team	Pld	W	L	GW	GL	Pts
Malta	5	5	0	15	3	10
Libya	5	4	1	13	5	9
Palestine	5	3	2	12	6	8
Maldives	5	2	3	7	10	7
Namibia	5	1	4	4	12	6
Liberia	5	0	5	0	15	5

	LBR	LBY	MDV	MLT	NAM	PLE
Liberia		0–3	0–3	0–3	0–3	0–3
Libya	3–0		3–0	1–3	3–0	3–2
Maldives	3–0	0–3		1–3	3–1	0–3
Malta	3–0	3–1	3–1		3–0	3–1
Namibia	3–0	0–3	1–3	0–3		0–3
Palestine	3–0	2–3	3–0	1–3	3–0	

==== Group R ====
Team	Pld	W	L	GW	GL	Pts
South Africa	5	5	0	15	0	10
Nepal	5	4	1	12	3	9
Jersey	5	3	2	9	6	8
Seychelles	5	2	3	6	9	7
Guatemala	5	1	4	3	12	6
Zambia	5	0	5	0	15	0

	GUA	JEY	NEP	SEY	RSA	ZAM
Guatemala		0–3	0–3	0–3	0–3	3–0
Jersey	3–0		0–3	3–0	0–3	3–0
Nepal	3–0	3–0		3–0	0–3	3–0
Seychelles	3–0	0–3	0–3		0–3	3–0
South Africa	3–0	3–0	3–0	3–0		3–0
Zambia	0–3	0–3	0–3	0–3	0–3	

==== Group S ====
Team	Pld	W	L	GW	GL	Pts
Jamaica	5	5	0	15	0	10
Bangladesh	5	4	1	12	5	9
Madagascar	5	3	2	11	8	8
Guernsey	5	2	3	7	9	7
Botswana	5	1	4	4	12	6
Democratic Republic of the Congo	5	0	5	0	15	0

	BAN	BOT	COD	GGY	JAM	MAD
Bangladesh		3–0	3–0	3–0	0–3	3–2
Botswana	0–3		3–0	0–3	0–3	1–3
Democratic Republic of the Congo	0–3	0–3		0–3	0–3	0–3
Guernsey	0–3	3–0	3–0		0–3	1–3
Jamaica	3–0	3–0	3–0	3–0		3–0
Madagascar	2–3	3–1	3–0	3–1	0–3	

=== Knockout stage ===
==== Places 97–105 ====
First Round
Palestine	0
Jersey	3

Second Round
Malta	1
Nepal	3
Jersey	0
Jamaica	3
Libya	3
Madagascar	2
Bangladesh	0
South Africa	3

Third Round
Nepal	1
Jamaica	3
Libya	1
South Africa	3

Position 97
Jamaica	3
South Africa	2

==== Places 106–111 ====
First Round		Second Round		Position 106
		Maldives	3
Botswana	3	Botswana	1
Guatemala	0			Maldives	X
Guernsey	3			Seychelles	X
Namibia	0	Guernsey	1
		Seychelles	3

Positions 110
Guatemala	0
Namibia	3
