= Table tennis at the 2015 European Games – Men's team =

Table tennis – men's team at the 2015 European Games
- Venue: Baku Crystal Hall
- Date: 13–15 June
- Competitors: 48 from 16 nations

Medalists
gold medal	Marcos Freitas, Tiago Apolónia, João Geraldo	Portugal
silver medal	Simon Gauzy, Adrien Mattenet, Emmanuel Lebesson	France
bronze medal	Robert Gardos, Stefan Fegerl, Daniel Habesohn	Austria

The men's team in table tennis at the 2015 European Games in Baku was the 1st edition of the event in a European Games It was held at Baku Crystal Hall from 13 to 15 June 2015.

== Main Draw ==
First round
Germany	3
Spain	0
Ukraine	0
Sweden	3
Belarus	3
Czech Republic	2
Greece	1
France	3
Austria	3
Croatia	0
Hungary	0
Russia	3
Poland	3
Azerbaijan	0
Romania	1
Portugal	3

Quarterfinals
Germany	3
Sweden	2
Belarus	0
France	3
Austria	3
Russia	0
Poland	0
Portugal	3

Semifinals
Germany	2
France	3
Austria	1
Portugal	3

Gold Medal Match
France	1
Portugal	3
Bronze Medal Match
Germany	0
Austria	3

=== First round ===
13 June 2015	Germany	3 – 0	Spain

Timo Boll	3–0	Alvaro Robles	11–2, 11–8, 11–5
Dimitrij Ovtcharov	3–1	Carlos Machado	11–5, 19–17, 4–11, 11–6
Patrick Baum / Dimitrij Ovtcharov	3–1	Marc Duran / Alvaro Robles	7–11, 11–4, 13–11, 11–6

13 June 2015	Ukraine	0 – 3	Sweden

Yaroslav Zhmudenko	2–3	Kristian Karlsson	11–2, 6–11, 11–7, 6–11, 8–11
Kou Lei	0–3	Pär Gerell	8–11, 5–11, 8–11
Ivan Katkov / Yaroslav Zhmudenko	0–3	Jon Persson / Pär Gerell	6–11, 7–11, 4–11

13 June 2015	Belarus	3 – 2	Czech Republic

Evgueni Chtchetinine	1–3	Tomáš Konečný	9–11, 7–11, 11–8, 7–11
Vladimir Samsonov	3–0	Dmitrij Prokopcov	15–13, 11–8, 11–8
Pavel Platonov / Vladimir Samsonov	3–2	Tomáš Tregler / Tomáš Konečný	11–9, 8–11, 7–11, 11–7, 12–10
Pavel Platonov	2–3	Dmitrij Prokopcov	11–5, 12–10, 7–11, 10–12, 9–11
Evgueni Chtchetinine	3–0	Tomáš Tregler	11–5, 11–7, 12–10

13 June 2015	Greece	1 – 3	France

Panagiotis Gionis	3–2	Simon Gauzy	11–2, 11–2, 8–11, 7–11, 12–10
Kalinikos Kreanga	1–3	Adrien Mattenet	1–11, 7–11, 11–8, 6–11
Konstantinos Papageorgiou] / Kalinikos Kreanga	1–3	Emmanuel Lebesson / Simon Gauzy	4–11, 11–7, 8–11, 7–11
Konstantinos Papageorgiou]	1–3	Adrien Mattenet	7–11, 11–5, 12–14, 11–9, 4–11

13 June 2015	Austria	3 – 0	Croatia

Robert Gardos	3–1	Ruiwu Tan	11–6, 13–11, 1–11, 11–4
Stefan Fegerl	3–1	Andrej Gaćina	8–11, 11–6, 11–7, 11–4
Daniel Habesohn / Robert Gardos	3–0	Tomislav Pucar / Ruiwu Tan	11–9, 11–5, 11–8

13 June 2015	Hungary	0 – 3	Russia

Dániel Kosiba	1–3	Kirill Skachkov	11–9, 12–14, 5–11, 5–11
Ádám Pattantyús	0–3	Alexander Shibaev	4–11, 3–11, 7–11
János Jakab / Dániel Kosiba	0–3	Alexey Liventsov / Kirill Skachkov	3–11, 8–11, 8–11

13 June 2015	Poland	3 – 0	Azerbaijan

Wang Zengyi	3–0	Farhad Ismayilov	11–3, 11–5, 11–6
Daniel Górak	3–0	Ramil Jafarov	11–5, 11–6, 11–7
Jakub Dyjas / Daniel Górak	3–0	Khayai Hashimli / Farhad Ismayilov	11–1, 12–10, 11–8

13 June 2015	Romania	1 – 3	Portugal

Adrian Crișan	2–3	Marcos Freitas	10–12, 11–8, 7–11, 11–8, 10–12
Constantin Cioti	3–2	Tiago Apolónia	2–11, 5–11, 11–5, 11–5, 11–5
Andrei Filimon / Constantin Cioti	1–3	João Geraldo / Tiago Apolónia	6–11, 14–12, 8–11,5–11
Adrian Crișan	0–3	João Geraldo	9–11, 6–11, 9–11

=== Quarterfinals ===
14 June 2015	Germany	3 – 2	Sweden

Dimitrij Ovtcharov	3–2	Pär Gerell	5–11, 11–6, 11–8, 9–11, 11–6
Patrick Baum	3–1	Kristian Karlsson	12–14, 11–7, 11–8, 11–9
Timo Boll / Patrick Baum		Jon Persson / Pär Gerell	w/o
Timo Boll		Kristian Karlsson	w/o
Dimitrij Ovtcharov	3–1	Jon Persson	11–9, 11–13, 13–11, 11–8

14 June 2015	Belarus	0 – 3	France

Evgueni Chtchetinine	2–3	Adrien Mattenet	11–5, 4–11, 9–11, 11–7, 11–13
Vladimir Samsonov	1–3	Emmanuel Lebesson	11–7, 7–11, 9–11, 7–11
Pavel Platonov / Vladimir Samsonov	2–3	Simon Gauzy / Emmanuel Lebesson	6–11, 11–7, 10–12, 11–6, 8–11

14 June 2015	Austria	3 – 0	Russia

Robert Gardos	3–0	Alexander Shibaev	11–9, 11–4, 11–9
Stefan Fegerl	3–0	Kirill Skachkov	11–5, 11–6, 12–10
Daniel Habesohn / Robert Gardos	3–2	Alexey Liventsov / Kirill Skachkov	11–8, 9–11, 11–8, 4–11, 11–5

14 June 2015	Poland	0 – 3	Portugal

Wang Zengyi	2–3	Tiago Apolónia	11–8, 12–10, 6–11, 12–14, 5–11
Jakub Dyjas	1–3	Marcos Freitas	8–11, 14–12, 10–12, 4–11
Daniel Górak / Jakub Dyjas	2–3	João Geraldo / Tiago Apolónia	11–5, 13–15, 11–9, 7–11, 9–11

=== Semifinals ===
15 June 2015	Germany	2 – 3	France

Dimitrij Ovtcharov	3–1	Adrien Mattenet	11–5, 11–3, 9–11, 11–9
Patrick Baum	3–2	Simon Gauzy	11–8, 3–11, 11–9, 9–11, 11–9
Timo Boll / Patrick Baum		Emmanuel Lebesson / Simon Gauzy	w/o
Dimitrij Ovtcharov	1–3	Emmanuel Lebesson	5–11, 9–11, 11–8, 9–11
Timo Boll		Adrien Mattenet	w/o

15 June 2015	Austria	1 – 3	Portugal

Robert Gardos	2–3	Tiago Apolónia	11–6, 10–12, 9–11, 11–8, 3–11
Stefan Fegerl	3–2	Marcos Freitas	8–11, 11–3, 7–11, 11–9, 16–14
Daniel Habesohn / Robert Gardos	1–3	João Geraldo / Tiago Apolónia	9–11, 8–11, 11–5, 8–11
Stefan Fegerl	2–3	João Geraldo	11–6, 7–11, 11–9, 5–11, 4–11

=== Bronze Medal ===
15 June 2015	Germany	0 – 3	Austria

Patrick Baum	0–3	Daniel Habesohn	8–11, 4–11, 12–14
Timo Boll		Robert Gardos	w/o
Dimitrij Ovtcharov / Patrick Baum	1–3	Stefan Fegerl / Daniel Habesohn	9–11, 7–11, 11–7, 10–12

=== Gold Medal ===
15 June 2015	France	1 – 3	Portugal

Adrien Mattenet	0–3	Tiago Apolónia	11–13, 9–11, 6–11
Simon Gauzy	2–3	Marcos Freitas	8–11, 12–10, 8–11, 11–9, 5–11
Emmanuel Lebesson / Simon Gauzy	3–2	João Geraldo / Tiago Apolónia	11–5, 11–6, 11–13, 10–12, 11–6
Adrien Mattenet	0–3	João Geraldo	4–11, 10–12, 9–11
