= Didukh (surname) =

Didukh is a Ukrainian surname. Notable people with the surname include:

- Oleksandr Didukh (born 1982), Ukrainian table tennis player
- Viktor Didukh (born 1987), Ukrainian para table tennis player
