= Marko Jevtović =

Marko Jevtović may refer to:

- Marko Jevtović (table tennis) (born 1987), Serbian table tennis player
- Marko Jevtović (footballer) (born 1993), Serbian footballer
