= 2018 ITTF Team World Cup – Men's team =

The men's team event of the 2018 ITTF Team World Cup took place at the Copper Box Arena in London from 22 to 25 February 2018.

All times are local (GMT).

== Medallists ==
Event	Gold	Silver	Bronze
Men's team	China; Fan Zhendong; Lin Gaoyuan; Ma Long; Xu Xin; Yu Ziyang	Japan; Tomokazu Harimoto; Koki Niwa; Yuya Oshima; Jin Ueda	England; Paul Drinkhall; Tom Jarvis; David McBeath; Liam Pitchford; Sam Walker
Men's team	China; Fan Zhendong; Lin Gaoyuan; Ma Long; Xu Xin; Yu Ziyang	Japan; Tomokazu Harimoto; Koki Niwa; Yuya Oshima; Jin Ueda	South Korea; Jeong Sang-eun; Jung Young-sik; Lee Sang-su; Lim Jong-hoon

== Tournament ==
=== Seeding ===
Teams were seeded based on the ITTF World Ranking of the three highest-ranked players in each team, as at February 2018.

1. China
2. Japan
3. Germany
4. Hong Kong
5. South Korea
6. Brazil
7. Sweden
8. England
9. France
10. Egypt
11. United States
12. Australia

=== Group stage ===
The group stage took place from 22 to 23 February.

==== Group A ====
Pos	Team	Pld	W	L	MW	ML	Pts	Qualification
1	China	2	2	0	6	0	4	Advanced to knockout stage
2	France	2	1	1	3	5	3	Advanced to knockout stage
3	Sweden	2	0	2	2	6	2	

22 February; 12:00	Report	China	3–0	France	Copper Box Arena, London
Score by game:
Ma Long / Xu Xin	3–0	Alexandre Cassin / Emmanuel Lebesson
Fan Zhendong	3–0	Quentin Robinot
Ma Long	3–0	Emmanuel Lebesson

22 February; 19:00	Report	China	3–0	Sweden	Copper Box Arena, London
Score by game:
Ma Long / Xu Xin	3–0	Pär Gerell / Anton Källberg
Fan Zhendong	3–0	Kristian Karlsson
Xu Xin	3–1	Anton Källberg

23 February; 12:00	Report	Sweden	2–3	France	Copper Box Arena, London
23 February; 12:00	Report	Score by game:			Copper Box Arena, London
23 February; 12:00	Report	Pär Gerell / Anton Källberg	1–3	Alexandre Cassin / Emmanuel Lebesson	Copper Box Arena, London
Kristian Karlsson			3–1	Quentin Robinot
Anton Källberg			1–3	Alexandre Cassin
Pär Gerell			3–1	Quentin Robinot
Kristian Karlsson			0–3	Emmanuel Lebesson
			–

==== Group B ====
Pos	Team	Pld	W	L	MW	ML	Pts	Qualification
1	Japan	2	2	0	6	1	4	Advanced to knockout stage
2	England	2	1	1	4	4	3	Advanced to knockout stage
3	Egypt	2	0	2	1	6	2	

22 February; 12:00	Report	Japan	3–0	Egypt	Copper Box Arena, London
Score by game:
Koki Niwa / Yuya Oshima	3–1	Mohamed El-Beiali / Ahmed Saleh
Tomokazu Harimoto	3–2	Omar Assar
Yuya Oshima	3–0	Mohamed El-Beiali

22 February; 19:00	Report	Japan	3–1	England	Copper Box Arena, London
Score by game:
Koki Niwa / Jin Ueda	3–2	Paul Drinkhall / Sam Walker
Tomokazu Harimoto	0–3	Liam Pitchford
Jin Ueda	3–1	Paul Drinkhall
Koki Niwa	3–0	Liam Pitchford

23 February; 12:00	Report	England	3–1	Egypt	Copper Box Arena, London
Score by game:
Paul Drinkhall / Sam Walker	3–1	El-Sayed Lashin / Ahmed Saleh
Liam Pitchford	3–1	Mohamed El-Beiali
Paul Drinkhall	2–3	Ahmed Saleh
Sam Walker	3–0	Mohamed El-Beiali

==== Group C ====
Pos	Team	Pld	W	L	MW	ML	Pts	Qualification
1	South Korea	2	2	0	6	2	4	Advanced to knockout stage
2	Germany	2	1	1	5	3	3	Advanced to knockout stage
3	Australia	2	0	2	0	6	2	

22 February; 12:00	Report	Germany	3–0	Australia	Copper Box Arena, London
Score by game:
Ruwen Filus / Patrick Franziska	3–0	David Powell / Kane Townsend
Dimitrij Ovtcharov	3–1	Hu Heming
Patrick Franziska	3–0	Kane Townsend

22 February; 19:00	Report	Germany	2–3	South Korea	Copper Box Arena, London
22 February; 19:00	Report	Score by game:			Copper Box Arena, London
22 February; 19:00	Report	Benedikt Duda / Patrick Franziska	1–3	Jeong Sang-eun / Jung Young-sik	Copper Box Arena, London
Dimitrij Ovtcharov			3–0	Lee Sang-su
Patrick Franziska			1–3	Jeong Sang-eun
Dimitrij Ovtcharov			3–1	Jung Young-sik
Benedikt Duda			1–3	Lee Sang-su
			–

23 February; 12:00	Report	South Korea	3–0	Australia	Copper Box Arena, London
Score by game:
Jung Young-sik / Lim Jong-hoon	3–0	David Powell / Kane Townsend
Lee Sang-su	3–1	Hu Heming
Jung Young-sik	3–0	David Powell

==== Group D ====
Pos	Team	Pld	W	L	MW	ML	Pts	Qualification
1	Brazil	2	2	0	6	2	4	Advanced to knockout stage
2	Hong Kong	2	1	1	5	4	3	Advanced to knockout stage
3	United States	2	0	2	1	6	2	

22 February; 12:00	Report	Hong Kong	3–1	United States	Copper Box Arena, London
Score by game:
Ho Kwan Kit / Ng Pak Nam	3–0	Adar Alguetti / Feng Yijun
Wong Chun Ting	0–3	Kanak Jha
Ho Kwan Kit	3–0	Feng Yijun
Wong Chun Ting	3–0	Adar Alguetti

22 February; 19:00	Report	Hong Kong	2–3	Brazil	Copper Box Arena, London
22 February; 19:00	Report	Score by game:			Copper Box Arena, London
22 February; 19:00	Report	Ho Kwan Kit / Lam Siu Hang	3–0	Eric Jouti / Gustavo Tsuboi	Copper Box Arena, London
Wong Chun Ting			1–3	Hugo Calderano
Ho Kwan Kit			2–3	Gustavo Tsuboi
Wong Chun Ting			3–1	Eric Jouti
Lam Siu Hang			0–3	Hugo Calderano
			–

23 February; 12:00	Report	Brazil	3–0	United States	Copper Box Arena, London
Score by game:
Eric Jouti / Gustavo Tsuboi	3–0	Adar Alguetti / Feng Yijun
Hugo Calderano	3–0	Kanak Jha
Gustavo Tsuboi	3–0	Feng Yijun

=== Knockout stage ===
The knockout stage took place from 23 to 25 February.

Quarterfinals
China	3
Germany	0
England	3
Brazil	1
South Korea	3
France	2
Hong Kong	2
Japan	3

Semifinals
China	3
England	0
South Korea	2
Japan	3

Final
China	3
Japan	0

==== Quarterfinals ====
23 February; 19:00	Report	China	3–0	Germany	Copper Box Arena, London
Score by game:
Fan Zhendong / Xu Xin	3–0	Benedikt Duda / Patrick Franziska
Ma Long	3–0	Ruwen Filus
Xu Xin	3–0	Benedikt Duda

23 February; 19:00	Report	England	3–1	Brazil	Copper Box Arena, London
Score by game:
Paul Drinkhall / Sam Walker	3–2	Eric Jouti / Gustavo Tsuboi
Liam Pitchford	3–0	Hugo Calderano
Paul Drinkhall	2–3	Gustavo Tsuboi
Liam Pitchford	3–1	Eric Jouti

23 February; 19:00	Report	South Korea	3–2	France	Copper Box Arena, London
23 February; 19:00	Report	Score by game:			Copper Box Arena, London
23 February; 19:00	Report	Jeong Sang-eun / Jung Young-sik	3–1	Alexandre Cassin / Emmanuel Lebesson	Copper Box Arena, London
Lee Sang-su			0–3	Quentin Robinot
Jung Young-sik			3–2	Alexandre Cassin
Lee Sang-su			2–3	Emmanuel Lebesson
Jeong Sang-eun			3–0	Quentin Robinot
			–

23 February; 19:00	Report	Hong Kong	2–3	Japan	Copper Box Arena, London
23 February; 19:00	Report	Score by game:			Copper Box Arena, London
23 February; 19:00	Report	Lam Siu Hang / Ng Pak Nam	2–3	Koki Niwa / Jin Ueda	Copper Box Arena, London
Wong Chun Ting			3–0	Tomokazu Harimoto
Ng Pak Nam			0–3	Jin Ueda
Wong Chun Ting			3–1	Koki Niwa
Lam Siu Hang			1–3	Tomokazu Harimoto
			–

==== Semifinals ====
24 February; 12:00	Report	China	3–0	England	Copper Box Arena, London
Score by game:
Ma Long / Xu Xin	3–0	Paul Drinkhall / Sam Walker
Fan Zhendong	3–1	Liam Pitchford
Ma Long	3–0	Sam Walker

24 February; 17:00	Report	South Korea	2–3	Japan	Copper Box Arena, London
24 February; 17:00	Report	Score by game:			Copper Box Arena, London
24 February; 17:00	Report	Lee Sang-su / Jung Young-sik	2–3	Jin Ueda / Koki Niwa	Copper Box Arena, London
Jeong Sang-eun			1–3	Tomokazu Harimoto
Jung Young-sik			3–1	Koki Niwa
Lee Sang-su			3–2	Tomokazu Harimoto
Jeong Sang-eun			2–3	Jin Ueda
			–

==== Final ====
25 February; 15:00	Report	China	3–0	Japan	Copper Box Arena, London
Score by game:
Ma Long / Xu Xin	3–0	Koki Niwa / Jin Ueda
Fan Zhendong	3–0	Tomokazu Harimoto
Ma Long	3–1	Koki Niwa
