= Xu Xin (table tennis) =

Former Chinese Table Tennis Player, Former Wo. Nr. 1

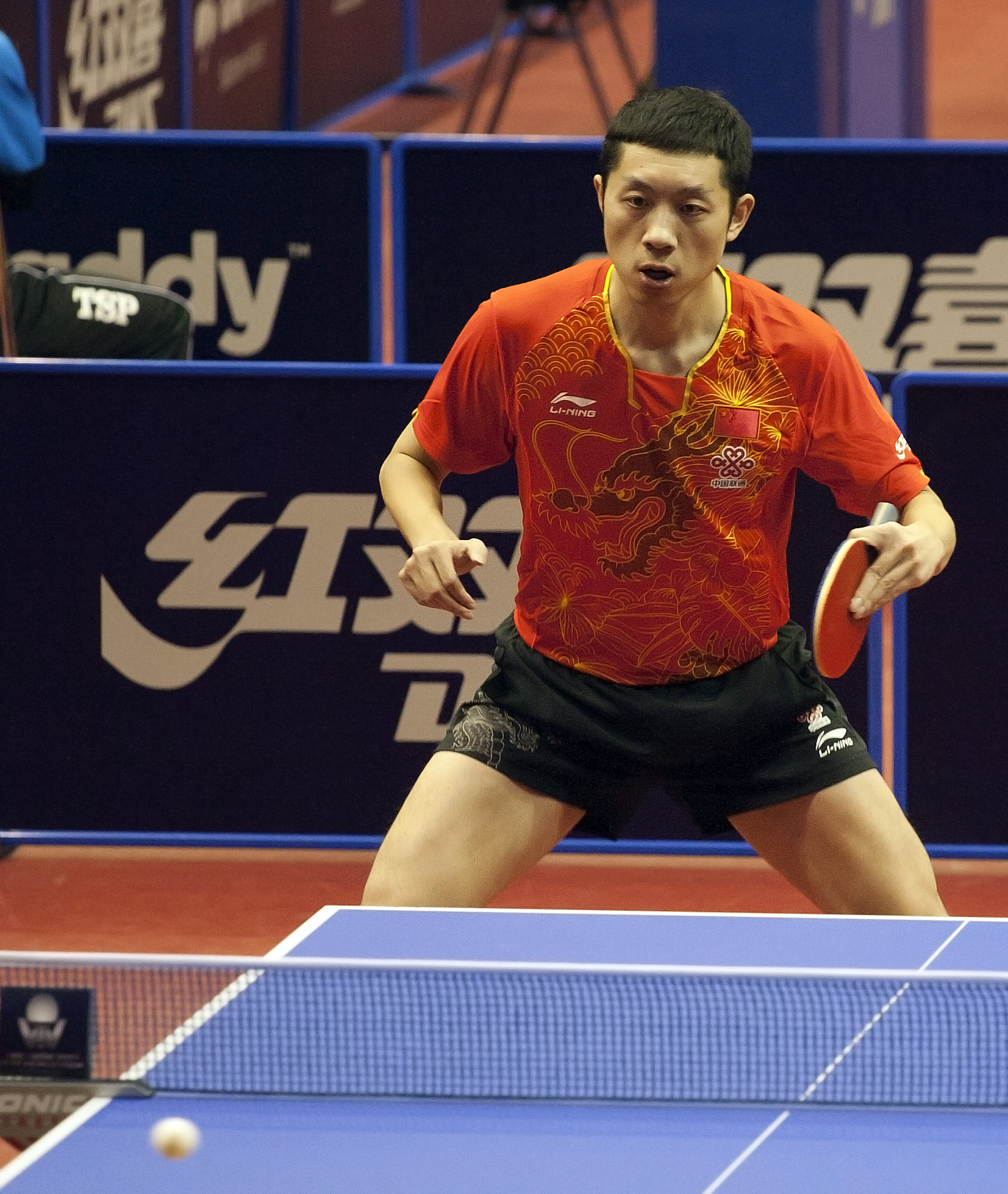
- Xu Xin in 2017

Personal information
- Native name: 许昕
- Nationality: China
- Born: 8 January 1990 (age 36) Xuzhou, Jiangsu, China
- Height: 183 cm (6 ft 0 in)
- Weight: 75 kg (165 lb)

Sport
- Sport: Table tennis
- Club: Shanghai Zhongxing
- Playing style: left-handed, penhold grip
- Equipment: Stiga Dynasty Carbon, TG2 Skyline Blue (FH, black), DHS NEO Hurricane 3 custom sponge (BH, red)
- Highest ranking: 1 (January 2013)
- Current ranking: 103 (May 2023)
Medal record
Men's Table Tennis
| Event | 1st | 2nd | 3rd |
|---|---|---|---|
| Olympic Games | 2 | 1 | 0 |
| World Championships | 10 | 1 | 2 |
| World Cup | 7 | 1 | 0 |
| Total | 19 | 3 | 2 |
Representing China
Olympic Games
| Gold medal – first place | 2016 Rio de Janeiro | Team |
| Gold medal – first place | 2020 Tokyo | Team |
| Silver medal – second place | 2020 Tokyo | Mixed doubles |
World Championships
| Gold medal – first place | 2010 Moscow | Team |
| Gold medal – first place | 2011 Rotterdam | Doubles |
| Gold medal – first place | 2012 Dortmund | Team |
| Gold medal – first place | 2014 Tokyo | Team |
| Gold medal – first place | 2015 Suzhou | Doubles |
| Gold medal – first place | 2015 Suzhou | Mixed doubles |
| Gold medal – first place | 2016 Kuala Lumpur | Team |
| Gold medal – first place | 2017 Düsseldorf | Doubles |
| Gold medal – first place | 2018 Halmstad | Team |
| Gold medal – first place | 2019 Budapest | Mixed doubles |
| Silver medal – second place | 2009 Yokohama | Doubles |
| Bronze medal – third place | 2013 Paris | Singles |
| Bronze medal – third place | 2017 Düsseldorf | Singles |
World Cup
| Gold medal – first place | 2009 Linz | Team |
| Gold medal – first place | 2010 Dubai | Team |
| Gold medal – first place | 2011 Magdeburg | Team |
| Gold medal – first place | 2013 Verviers | Singles |
| Gold medal – first place | 2013 Guangzhou | Team |
| Gold medal – first place | 2015 Dubai | Team |
| Gold medal – first place | 2018 London | Team |
| Silver medal – second place | 2016 Saarbrücken | Singles |
ITTF World Tour Grand Finals
| Gold medal – first place | 2012 Hangzhou | Singles |
| Gold medal – first place | 2013 Dubai | Singles |
| Silver medal – second place | 2009 Macau | Singles |
| Bronze medal – third place | 2015 Lisbon | Singles |
| Bronze medal – third place | 2016 Doha | Singles |
Asian Games
| Gold medal – first place | 2010 Guangzhou | Mixed doubles |
| Gold medal – first place | 2010 Guangzhou | Team |
| Gold medal – first place | 2014 Incheon | Singles |
| Gold medal – first place | 2014 Incheon | Team |
| Silver medal – second place | 2014 Incheon | Doubles |
Asian Championships
| Gold medal – first place | 2009 Lucknow | Doubles |
| Gold medal – first place | 2009 Lucknow | Team |
| Gold medal – first place | 2011 Macau | Doubles |
| Silver medal – second place | 2015 Pattaya | Singles |
| Bronze medal – third place | 2009 Lucknow | Singles |
| Bronze medal – third place | 2009 Lucknow | Mixed doubles |

Xu Xin (simplified Chinese: 许昕; traditional Chinese: 許昕; pinyin: Xǔ Xīn; born 8 January 1990) is a Chinese professional table tennis player. He first reached his career-high singles ranking of world No. 1 by the International Table Tennis Federation (ITTF) in January 2013.

He is Deputy Chairman of the Asian Table Tennis Federation.

He has won 17 World Tour Singles titles and won the World Championships in men's doubles thrice, mixed doubles twice, and five times in the team event. In addition, Xu Xin along with Ma Long and Zhang Jike won the men's team gold medal at the 2016 Summer Olympics in Rio de Janeiro.

== Playing style and equipment ==
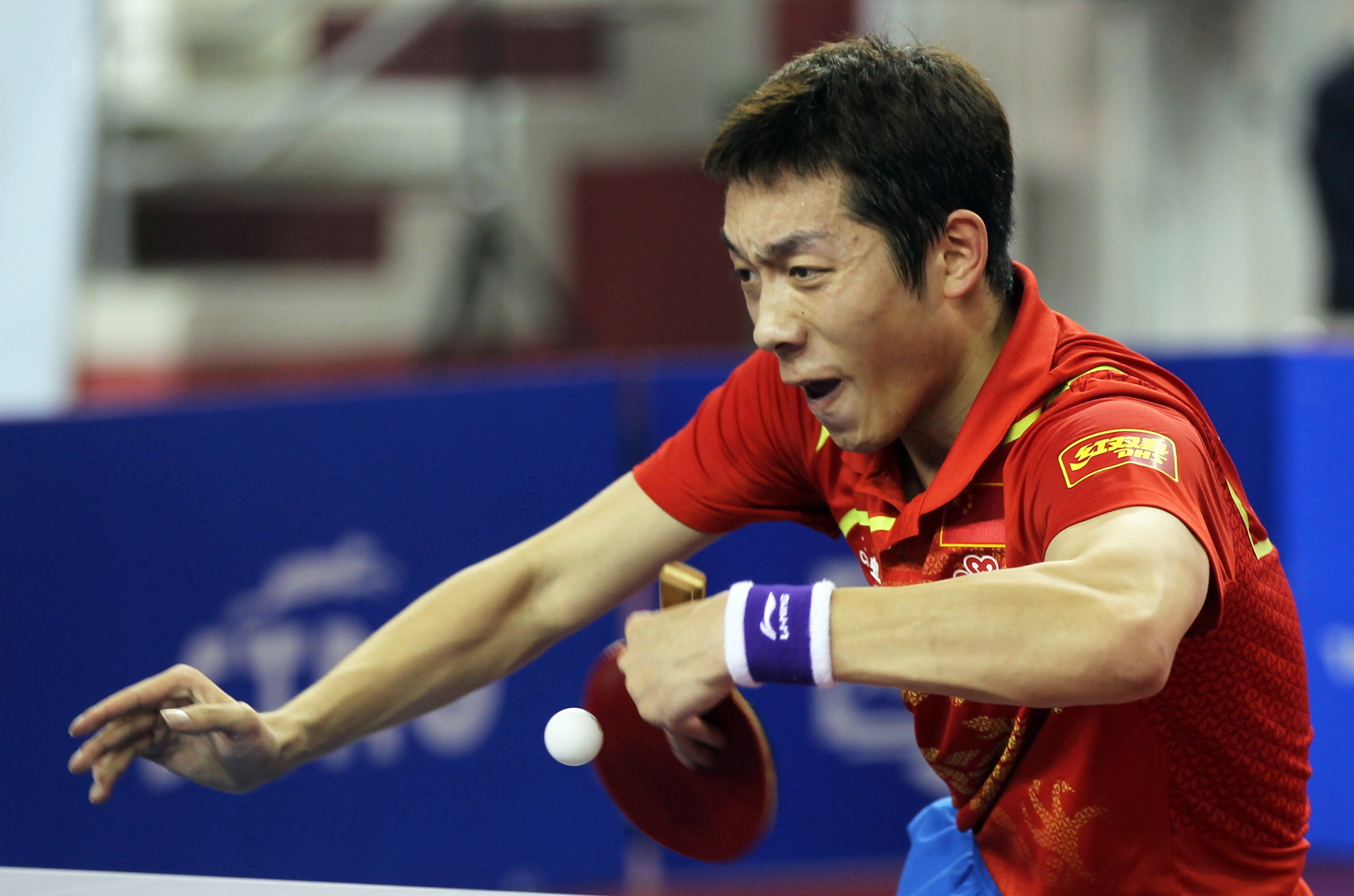
Xu Xin in the men's final of the Qatar Open 2012

Xu Xin is one of the few penhold grip players in China, especially among the younger generation who are mostly shakehand players. He follows the footsteps of other penhold champions such as Wang Hao and Ma Lin.

With his long arms and frame, he is able to reach balls hit wide. His long arms enable a unique forehand loop, with his arm almost fully outstretched. He has also adopted the reverse penhold backhand grip, a recent development for China's penholders, allowing a two-winged attack. He still uses a traditional penhold backhand to lob and push the ball with the forehand side of his racket. More recently, Xu Xin played to counter with his reverse penhold backhand, allowing him to maintain aggression in the points on his backhand side. A biomechanical study analyzed Xu Xin’s body movements during topspin strokes, including his elbow, body, and leg angles.

Xu Xin's main strength is his shot variation and fast forehand loops, often stepping very deep into his backhand corner to use his forehand. He sets these shots up with his extremely spinny and deceptive serves, and has some of the best footwork in table tennis. He is also something of a 'crowd entertainer’, often coming up with wild, and sometimes inappropriate, shots. He has been dubbed the 'show man' in recent years. This is perhaps due to his playful nature and confidence in playing. He admitted that he hopes to try to be more efficient and effective with his shot selection as he matures and carries more responsibilities. More recently, Xu Xin has been called "XUperman", referring to his many "superman-like" moments. These names have been widely popularized by Adam Bobrow, an ITTF commentator.

== Career ==
=== 2013 ===
In January 2013, he reached the No. 1 spot in the World Rankings thanks to the points obtained by winning the ITTF World Tour Grand Finals in December 2012.

=== 2014 ===
In January 2014, Xu Xin defended his title by beating world No. 1 ranked Ma Long in the finals match of the 2013 ITTF World Tour Grand Finals held in Dubai.

=== 2016 ===
In 2016, Xu Xin defeated world No. 1 ranked and current World Champion Ma Long 4–2 in the semi-finals match of the 2016 Japan Open, but then was beaten by world No. 2 ranked Fan Zhendong in the finals. One week later after the Japan Open, Xu Xin won his third Korea Open title after beating Ma Long again 4–3 in the finals.

However, he was deemed not good enough to be entered into the singles tournament of the Rio 2016 Summer Olympics.

=== 2017 ===
In late 2017, he had a disappointing German Open, where in doubles Xu and his partner Fan Zhendong were knocked out in the Round of 16, and lost in the Quarterfinals to Lee Sang-su 4–0 in the singles event. In the Swedish Open, he won the doubles event with Fan Zhendong, before defeating Fan, the world No. 2, 4–1 one hour later in the Men's Singles event. At the 2017 ITTF World Tour Grand Finals, Xu Xin was seeded 5th and lost to 3rd seed Fan Zhendong in the quarter-finals.

=== 2018 ===
Xu Xin started his 2018 year by participating with teammates Ma Long, Fan Zhendong, Lin Gaoyuan and Yu Ziyang in the 2018 ITTF Team World Cup, beating Japan in the final. During the tournament, Xu only dropped one set.

Xu Xin entered one of the six platinum events of the tour, the Qatar Open, seeking an unprecedented fourth title. He almost suffered a defeat to Zhou Yu winning 4–3, but he was beaten by Fan Zhendong in the semi-finals 4–1. The following day, Xu Xin along with Fan Zhendong beat Jun Mizutani and Yuya Oshima to claim the men's doubles title. One week later at the German Open, Xu was seeded third but lost to fifth seeded Ma Long in the final. Xu Xin partnered Ma Long to claim his second doubles title of the year defeating Lee Sang-su and Jeong Young-sik in the final.

The next month, Xu Xin was a part of the winning team China at the 2018 World Team Table Tennis Championships in his tenth appearance at the World Championships. Xu earned the final point for team China during the final, beating Patrick Franziska 3–1 for China to claim the title with a 3–0 win over Germany.

At the China Open, Xu Xin was looking for his first World Tour title of the year. However, his ambitions were stopped in his home country by Lim Jong-hoon in the Round of 32. At the next World Tour platinum event, the Korea Open, Xu Xin was seeded 3rd but lost in the Round of 16 to Jang Woo-jin.

Looking to redeem himself, Xu Xin claimed the title at the Australian Open beating qualifier Liu Dingshuo in the final, Xu Xin's first World Tour title of the year. Right after that, Xu Xin claimed another title at the Bulgaria Open beating Japan's Kenta Matsudaira in the final. Xu Xin claimed his third men's doubles titles with Ma Long at the Bulgarian Open, their second title as a pair in 2018.

Because of his lack of participation in the Asian Cup earlier that year, Xu Xin did not participate in the 2018 ITTF Men's World Cup.

At the Swedish Open, Xu Xin was looking to defend his title, but lost to top seed Fan Zhendong in the final. Two days later at the Austrian Open, Xu Xin lost in the final to qualifier Liang Jingkun 4–3 after Liang Jingkun had stunningly beat Fan Zhendong 4–2 in the semi-finals. Xu also claimed his first mixed doubles title ever at the Austrian Open, winning with Liu Shiwen over Cheng-I-Ching and Chen Chien-an in the final.

Due to Xu's appearance in five finals and claiming two of the titles, Xu Xin was seeded first in the 2018 ITTF World Tour Grand Finals, followed closely by Fan Zhendong, Ma Long, and Liang Jingkun. Xu Xin lost to compatriot Lin Gaoyuan in the quarter-finals, 4–2.

=== 2019 ===
Xu Xin started off the year at the 2019 Hungarian Open where he reached the semi-finals. Xu Xin lost to the eventual champion Lin Gaoyuan.

At the Qatar Open, Xu Xin faced off against his old rival Ma Long in the semi-final stage. Ma Long had just returned from injury and was making his first appearance on the ITTF World Tour since many months before. In a highly anticipated match, Xu Xin eventually lost to eventual champion Ma Long, where he beat Lin Gaoyuan in the finals.

Heading in as the number 2 seed at the 2019 ITTF World Table Tennis Championships, Xu Xin was looking to prove himself during this competition. He participated in the men's singles and mixed doubles with Liu Shiwen. After the draw was made, Xu Xin was the only Chinese player in the bottom half of the draw. Because of the seedings, #1 Fan Zhendong, #3 Lin Gaoyuan, #9 Liang Jingkun, and #11 Ma Long were all drawn in the top half of the draw. Much pressure was placed on Xu to help achieve an all Chinese final, but was also a large opportunity for Xu Xin to perform well at a World Championships. Xu Xin won his first round 4–1 against Jan Zibrat and his second round 4–0 over Austria's Stefan Fegerl. However, Xu's road to the final was stopped by Frenchman Simon Gauzy 4–2. Gauzy outperformed Xu and Gauzy is even said to have "outspinned the spin master". Xu's shocking defeat meant that for the first time in over 15 years, there would not be an all Chinese final. The last time this happened was at the 2003 World Championships, where Austria's Werner Schlager faced off against Joo Saehyuk in the men's final. In the mixed doubles event, Xu did not falter, where Xu Xin and Liu Shiwen claimed victory 4–1 over Kasumi Ishikawa and Maharu Yoshimura.

At the 2019 Japan Open, Xu Xin became the second person in history to achieve a coveted "triple crown", the first being Jang Woojin at the 2018 Korea Open. Xu Xin claimed the champion in singles, men's doubles, and mixed doubles. In the men's singles final, Xu Xin defeated Lin Yun-ju, "the silent assassin", in a highly anticipated final. Xu Xin claimed doubles titles with Fan Zhendong and Zhu Yuling.

Xu Xin's performance at the Japan Open was enough to place him again at number one in the world, a position that he last held in early 2015. He replaced Fan Zhendong from the position, who had previously held the spot for over a year. Fan Zhendong dropped to #3 in the world rankings.

The following week at the Korea Open, Xu Xin once again claimed the singles title in the final, defeating his good-friend Ma Long in the final. Coming into the final, Xu Xin had lost his six previous encounters against Ma Long on the international stage, and Ma was heavily regarded as the favorite to win. After an amazing match, Xu Xin said that "Winning the title is not the reason I am feeling so happy. It’s because I beat Ma Long", paying homage to Ma Long's dominance over the past years. Xu Xin again won the men's doubles title with Fan Zhendong, but in the mixed doubles Xu Xin and Liu Shiwen were defeated by Wong Chun Ting and Doo Hoi Kem at the final stage. This marked the first ever loss for the pairing of Xu Xin and Liu Shiwen, recent mixed doubles world champions at the 2019 ITTF World Table Tennis Championships.

The next week at the Australian Open, Xu Xin claimed three men's singles championships in a row on the ITTF World Tour, and became the first person to successfully defend a men's singles title at the Australian Open. Xu Xin beat his colleague Wang Chuqin in the final 4–0; Wang Chuqin had defeated Ma Long at the semi-final stage.

After the Australian Open, the first of the T2 Events were played in Malaysia. In this tournament, Xu Xin showed signs of slowness and tiredness, proposed to be due to the many weeks of play on the world tour. Xu Xin made it to the semi-finals, where he lost to Fan Zhendong 4–0 in a rematch of their semi-final match at the Japan Open earlier this year, where Xu won 4–3.

Many of the Chinese players have vocalized their dislike of many ITTF events being played one after the other, with no real breaks in between. After the final in Australia, Xu Xin responded "too tired". Ma Long and other Chinese players also said the same, but it is said that competitions must be played in order to maintain higher world rankings for the Chinese players, all in preparation for Tokyo 2020.

At the 2019 Chinese National Championships, Xu Xin and four of his other prominent colleagues, Ma Long, Fan Zhendong, Liu Shiwen, and Ding Ning all pulled out of the competition. Their reasoning was for them to rest up after they had just played several events back to back on the ITTF World Tour.

Xu Xin ended the year as the World No. 1.

Xu Xin has been referred to by several nicknames in media and fan discussions, including “XUperman,” “The Showman,” and “The Cloudwalker,” in reference to his playing style and consistent performances on the court.

=== 2021 ===
Xu Xin was originally slated to play at WTT Doha in March, but along with the rest of the Chinese national team, he withdrew from all international events until the Tokyo Olympics due to pandemic concerns. Xu played in the China National Qualification event in March and the Chinese Olympic Scrimmage in May, where he lost to several lesser known and lower ranked players.

In May, Xu was selected to represent China in the team event of the Tokyo Olympics. Xu reached the finals of the second leg of the Chinese Olympic Scrimmage, where he lost 4–3 to Fan Zhendong despite holding an 8-4 and 3–1 lead.

In July, Liu Shiwen and Xu Xin won silver in the mixed doubles event at the Tokyo Olympics being upset 4-3 by Japan's Mima Ito and Jun Mizutani despite initially leading 2–0.

In September, Xu reached the quarter-finals at the China National Games. After his round of 16 win over Zhou Yu, Xu noted that he had recently been investing more of himself into his family rather than purely table tennis. Xu lost to Liu Dingshuo in the quarter-finals, but went on to win gold in the mixed doubles event later that day.

=== 2022 ===
On November 3, the 2022 National Table Tennis Championships began on the first day of competition in Huangshi, Hubei. In the men's team group stage competition, Shanghai, which has Xu Xin, Zhao Zihao, Zhou Kai, and Fan Zhendong, defeated Guangxi 3-0 and got a good start.

In the third game, veteran Xu Xin came on the field to face Xie Yunxi. This was also a direct dialogue between the old and new generations of straight-ball players. In the first game, Xu Xin saved two game points after falling behind 8-10 and won 13-11. In the rematch, Xie Yunxi made a few mistakes, and Xu Xin quickly took the lead 6-0. In the end, he won again with 11-3. The third game was like a replica of the second game. In the end, Xu Xin secured a good start in the championship for Shanghai with 11-4. On October 12, 2024, after more than a year's absence, Xu Xin appeared as a seeded player in the 2024 National Table Tennis Championships and won two matches in a row. [On October 13, 2024, Xu Xin withdrew from the Men's Singles Quarterfinals of the 2024 National Table Tennis Championships due to injury. [On October 17, 2024, Xu Xin made his men's team debut at the National Table Tennis Championships with a victory over Jilin in the second stage of the tournament. [On October 19, Xu Xin defeated Xu Yingbin 3-2 (9-11/4-11/11-9/11-3/11-4) in the fourth set of the Shanghai Men's Team National Championships, helping the Shanghai team to get the third point, and the Shanghai Real Estate Group beat Heilongjiang Galaxy 3-1, completing the third consecutive Men's Team National Championships title.

== Career statistics ==
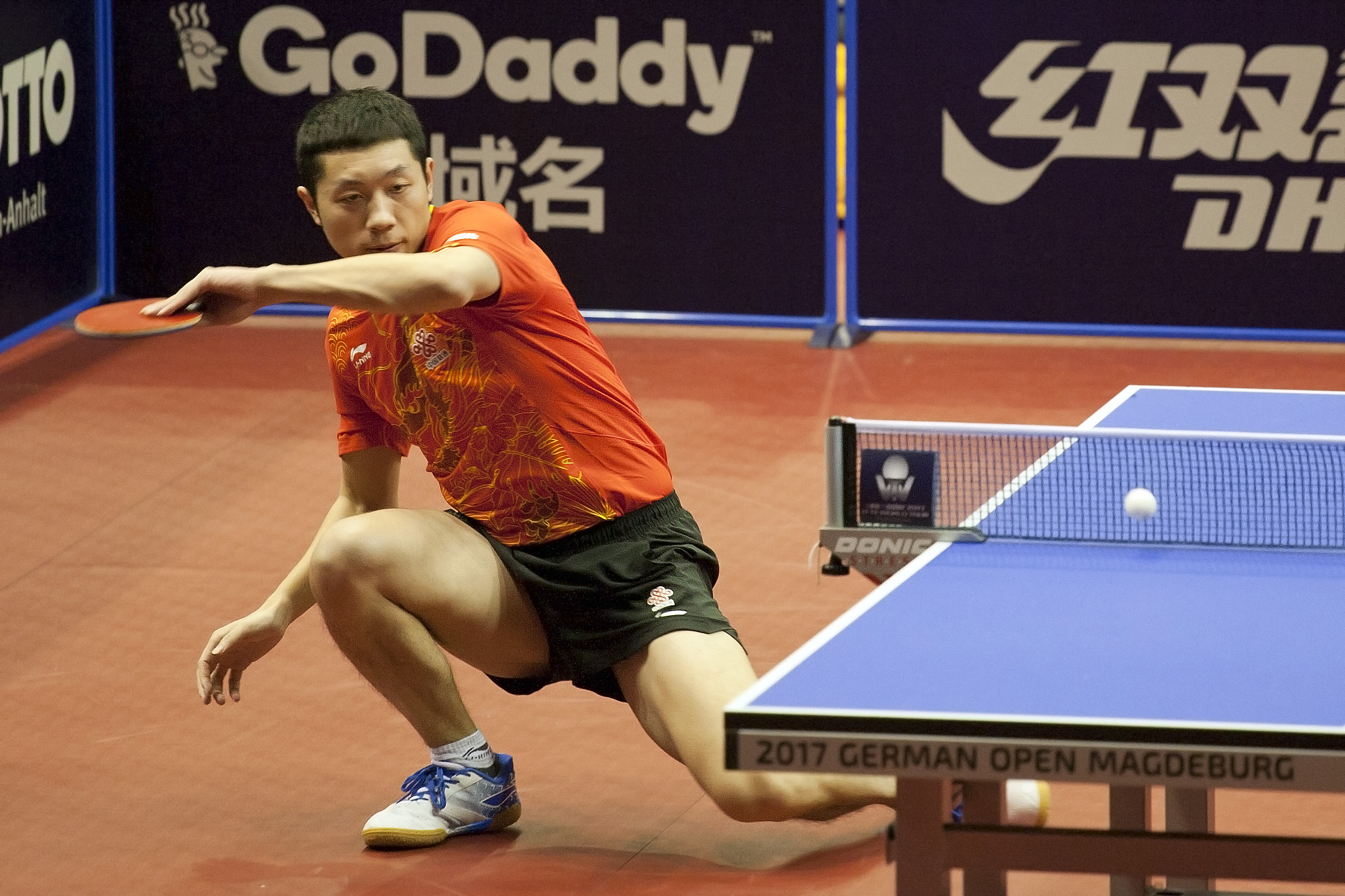
ITTF World Tour 2017 German Open

=== ITTF Major tournament performance timeline ===
Key
| W | F | SF | QF | #R | RR | A | NH |

(W) Won; (F) finalist; (SF) semi-finalist; (QF) quarterfinalist; (#R) rounds 4, 3, 2, 1; (RR) round-robin stage; (A) Absent; (NH) Not Held; (S) Singles Tournament; (D) Doubles Tournament; (XD) Mixed Doubles Tournament; (T) Team Tournament.

| Tournament | | 2009 | 2010 | 2011 | 2012 | 2013 | 2014 | 2015 | 2016 | 2017 | 2018 | 2019 | 2020 |
|---|---|---|---|---|---|---|---|---|---|---|---|---|---|
| World Cup | S | A | A | A | SF | W | A | A | F | A | A | | |
| World Cup | T | W | W | W | NH | W | NH | W | NH | NH | W | | |
| World Championships | S | 3R | NH | 4R | NH | SF | NH | 4R | NH | SF | NH | | |
| World Championships | T | NH | W | NH | W | NH | W | NH | W | NH | W | | |
| World Championships | D | F | NH | W | NH | A | NH | W | NH | W | NH | | |
| World Championships | XD | QF | NH | A | NH | A | NH | W | NH | A | NH | W | |
| World Tour Grand Finals | S | F | F | A | W | W | A | SF | SF | QF | QF | | |
| World Tour Grand Finals | D | | | | | | | | | | | | |
| Olympic Games | S | Not Held | | | A | Not Held | | | A | Not Held | | | A |
| Olympic Games | T | Not Held | | | A | Not Held | | | W | Not Held | | | W |
| Olympic Games | XD | Not Held | | | A | Not Held | | | A | Not Held | | | F |

Senior career highlights, as of April 2018:

Singles

- World Championships: SF (2013, 2017).
- World Cup appearances: 3. Record: winner (2013), runner up (2016), 4th (2012).
- World Tour winner (×18): Kuwait Open 2010; Slovenian Open 2011, Qatar Open 2011; Qatar Open 2012; China Open 2012, Russian Open 2012, Korea Open 2013; Qatar Open 2014, Korea Open 2014; Japan (Yokohama) Open 2015; Korea Open 2016; Swedish Open 2017, Australia Open 2018; Bulgaria Open 2018, Japan Open 2019, Korean Open 2019, Australian Open 2019; German Open 2020. Runner-up (×11): Belarus Open 2008; Korea Open 2012; China Open 2013; China Open 2014; Kuwait Open 2015, China Open 2015, Swedish Open 2015, Japan Open 2016, German Open 2018; Swedish Open 2018, Austrian Open 2018.
- World Tour Grand Finals appearances: 6. Record: winner (2012, 2013), runner up (2009, 2010), SF (2015, 16), QF (2017, 2018).
- Asian Games: winner (2014).
- Asian Championships: winner (2019); runner-up (2015); SF (2009, 12).
- Asian Cup: winner (2012, 13, 15, 16); 2nd (2011); 3rd (2010).

Doubles

- World Championships: winner (2011, 15, 17); runner-up (2009).
- World Tour winner (×28): Slovenian Open 2009, Danish Open 2009, Qatar Open 2009, China Open 2010, English Open 2011, Qatar Open 2011, Qatar Open 2012, Russian Open 2012, Korea Open 2012, China Open 2012, Kuwait Open 2013, China Open 2013, Swedish Open 2013, Japan Open 2015, China Open 2015, Swedish Open 2015, Kuwait Open 2016, Japan (Tokyo) Open 2016, Korea Open 2016, Japan Open 2017, Swedish Open 2017, German Open 2018, Bulgaria Open 2018, Hungarian Open 2019, Japan Open 2019, Korea Open 2019, Swedish Open 2019; German Open 2019.
  Runner-up (×10): China (Suzhou) Open 2009; Qatar Open 2010, Kuwait Open 2010; UAE Open 2011; Hungarian Open 2012, Slovenian Open 2012; Swedish Open 2014, China Open 2014; Kuwait Open 2015; China Open 2016.
- Asian Games: runner-up (2010, 14).
- Asian Championships: winner (2009, 15), runner-up (2013, 2019).

Mixed doubles

- Olympics: Runner-up (2020).
- World Championships: winner (2015, 2019), QF (2009).
- World Tour winner (x6): Austrian Open 2018, Hungarian Open 2019, Qatar Open 2019, Japan Open 2019, Swedish Open 2019; German Open 2019.
  Runner-up (×1): Korea Open 2019
- Asian Games: winner (2010).
- Asian Championships: winner (2012, 2019), SF (2009).

Team

- Olympic Games: winner (2016, 2020).
- World Championships: winner (2010, 12, 14, 16, 18).
- World Team Cup: winner (2009, 10, 11, 13, 15, 18).
- Asian Games: winner (2010, 14).
- Asian Championships: winner (2009, 12, 13, 15, 17, 19).

Summary of Accomplishments

- 2x Olympic Champion (2 Team)
- 10x World Champion (5 Doubles, 5 Team)
- 7x World Cup winner (1 Singles, 6 Team)
- 51x ITTF World Tour winner (18 Singles, 28 Doubles, 6 Mixed Doubles)
- 2x ITTF World Tour Grand Finals Champion (2 Singles)
- 4x Asian Games winner (1 Singles, 1 Mixed Doubles, 2 Team)
- 11x Asian Champion (1 Singles, 2 Doubles, 2 Mixed Doubles, 6 Team)
- 4x Asian Cup winner (4 Singles)

== Personal life ==
Xu Xin married table tennis player Yao Yan in 2016. They welcomed a son in September 2019.

As a child he attended a sports school in Jiangsu province. He sat next to badminton player Wang Shixian during his classes.
