= Pavel Širuček =

Czech table tennis player

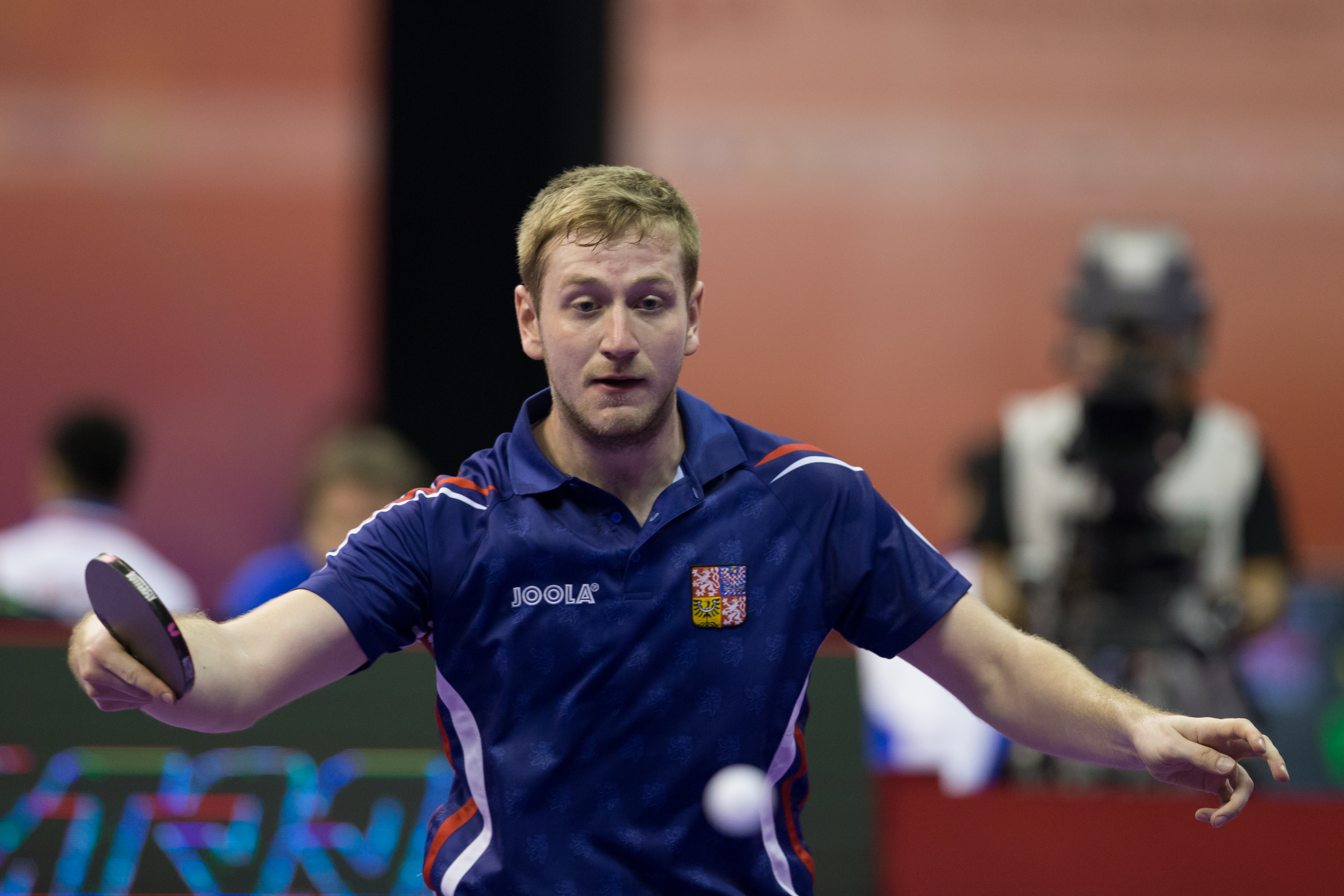
- WTTC 2016

Personal information
- Nationality: Czech
- Born: 20 November 1992 (age 32)

Sport
- Sport: Table tennis

Pavel Širuček (born 20 November 1992) is a Czech table tennis player. He competed in the 2020 Summer Olympics for Czech Republic.
