= Patrick Baum (table tennis) =

German table tennis player (born 1987)

Personal information
- Full name: BAUM Patrick
- Nationality: Germany
- Born: 23 June 1987 (age 39) Worms, West Germany
- Height: 1.82 m (6 ft 0 in)
- Weight: 78 kg (172 lb; 12.3 st)

Sport
- Sport: Table tennis
- Club: Borussia Dusseldorf (Germany)
- Highest ranking: 18 (March 2012)
- Current ranking: 19 (April 2015)
Medal record
Men's table tennis
Representing Germany
World Championships
Silver medal – second place	2012 Dortmund	Team
Silver medal – second place	2010 Moscow	Team
World Cup
Bronze medal – third place	2011 Magdeburg	Team
Bronze medal – third place	2010 Dubai	Team
Bronze medal – third place	2009 Linz	Team
European Championships
Silver medal – second place	2011 Gdansk-Sopot	Singles
Gold medal – first place	2011 Gdansk-Sopot	Team
Silver medal – second place	2010 Ostrava	Singles
Gold medal – first place	2010 Ostrava	Team
Gold medal – first place	2009 Stuttgart	Team
Gold medal – first place	2008 Saint-Petersburg	Team

Patrick Baum (born 23 June 1987 in Worms, West Germany) is a male table tennis player from Germany. He won the singles title at the 2005 World Junior Table Tennis Championships. Since 2008, he has won several medals in singles and team events in the World Table Tennis Championships, in the Table Tennis World Cup, and in the Table Tennis European Championships. In 2013, he defeated Dimitrij Ovtcharov in the round of 16 in the 2013 World Table Tennis Championships but was defeated by eventual champion Zhang Jike in the quarterfinals 4–1.

== See also ==
- List of table tennis players
