= Dmitrij Prokopcov =

Ukrainian table tennis player

Personal information
- Nationality: Ukraine (until 2008); Czech Republic (2008–2022); Malta (2023-present)
- Born: 5 January 1980 (age 46) Simferopol, Ukraine

Sport
- Sport: Table tennis
Medal record
Men's table tennis
Representing Malta
Games of the Small States of Europe
Bronze medal – third place	2025 Andorra la Vella	Doubles
Gold medal – first place	2025 Andorra la Vella	Team

Dmitrij Prokopcov (born 5 January 1980) is a table tennis player originally from Ukraine. He currently plays for the French team Hennebont and together with the Czech national team he represents the Czech Republic. According to the ITTF World ranking Prokopcov is the 96th player of the World, 46th of the Europe and 1st of the Czech Republic.

== Biography ==
Prokopcov was born in Ukraine where he started to play table tennis, when he was only six years old. He played in his born town Simferopol in the club named Saki Krym. When he was sixteen years old, he played for the Ukraine national team at the European Championship in 1996 in Bratislava. Later he also played at the World Championship in 1997, 1999, 2000 and 2001 for the Ukraine and at the European Championship in 1998, 2000, 2002 and 2003. After several tournaments played for Ukraine, Prokopcov stopped representing his country because of disputes with the Ukraine national team. Since 1998 he was playing in Nová huť in Ostrava in the Czech Republic. He claimed that "he has better training conditions in Ostrava". The reason of the disputes was, that he refused to participate in all the team meetings. Gradually, the connections between him and the Ukraine national team were stopped. Prokopcov got married in the Czech Republic and applied for Czech citizenship and in 2008 he became a Czech citizen which allowed him to represent the Czech Republic. Since 2005 to 2011 he played in the Prague's team El Niňo and in 2011 he switched to the French team Hennebont.

== Career ==
In his sport career, he achieved two titles in the Ukraine Championship. In the first start at the Czech Republic Championship in 2009 he break through to the final. He won the Prague Open tournament in 2001 and 2004. As a member of the El Niňo team he won the Czech league four times. He also helped Czech Republic to achieve the bronze medal in the European Championship in Ostrava in 2010.
