= János Jakab =

Hungarian table tennis player

Personal information
- Nationality: Hungary
- Born: 23 July 1986 (age 40) Budapest, Hungary
- Height: 1.79 m (5 ft 10 1/2 in)
- Weight: 72 kg (159 lb)

Sport
- Sport: Table tennis
- Club: Levallois Sporting Club (FRA)
- Playing style: Right-handed, classic
- Equipment: Butterfly Timo Spirit
- Highest ranking: 57 (September 2010)
- Current ranking: 183 (February 2013)

János Jakab (born 23 July 1986 in Budapest) is a Hungarian table tennis player. As of February 2013, Jakab is ranked no. 183 in the world by the International Table Tennis Federation (ITTF). Jakab is a member of the table tennis team for Levallois Sporting Club in Levallois-Perret, France, and is coached and trained by Péter Aranyosi. He is also right-handed, and uses the classic grip.

Jakab qualified for the men's singles tournament at the 2008 Summer Olympics in Beijing, by receiving an allocation spot from the Final World Qualification Tournament in Budapest, Hungary. He received a single bye in the preliminary round, before defeating French table tennis player and former Olympic bronze medalist Patrick Chila in his first match. Jakab progressed to the second round, but narrowly lost to European doubles champion Christian Süß of Germany, receiving a final set score of 1–4.
