= Ádám Pattantyús =

Hungarian table tennis player

Ádám Pattantyús (born 10 October 1978 in Nagykőrös) is a Hungarian table tennis player. He competed at the 2012 Summer Olympics in the Men's singles, but was defeated in the first round.
