= Wang Zengyi =

Chinese-Polish table tennis player

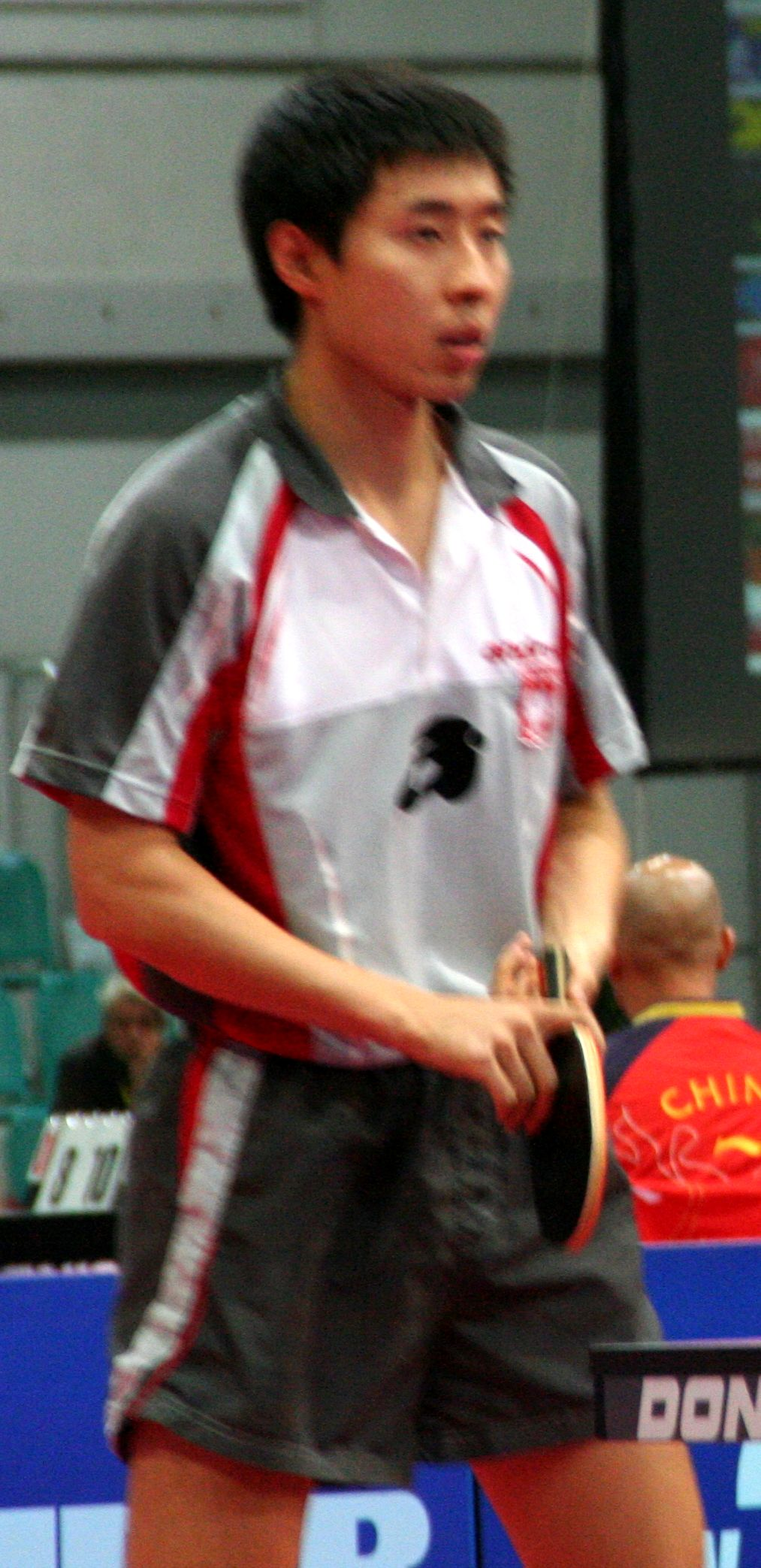
Wang in 2007

Wang Zengyi (born 24 June 1983 in Tianjin, China) is a Chinese-Polish table tennis player. He competed for Poland at the 2012 Summer Olympics. As of August 2016, he is ranked the no. 46 player in the world.
