= Jens Lundqvist =

Swedish table tennis player (born 1979)

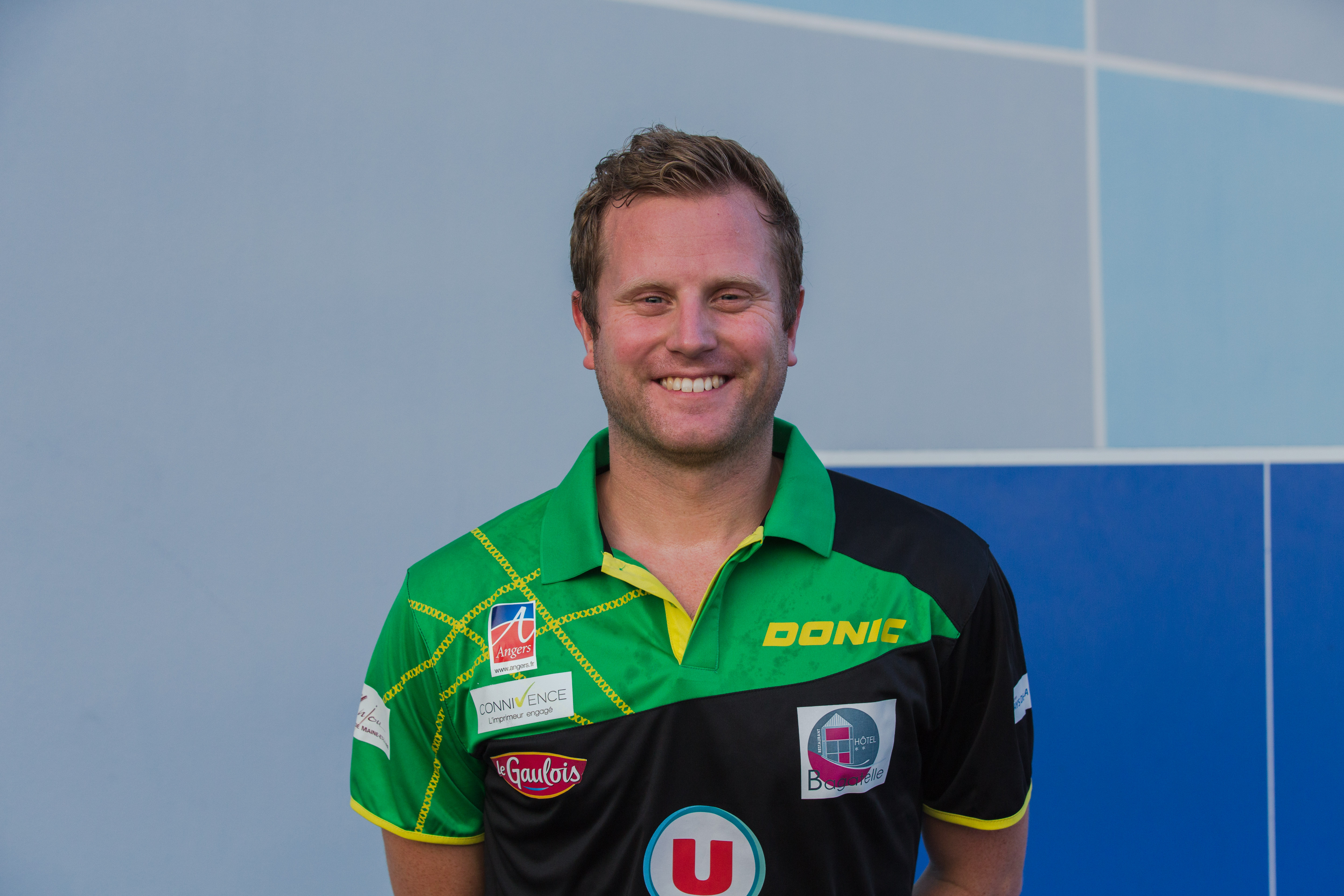

Personal information
- Full name: Jens Mikael Lundqvist
- Nationality: Swedish
- Born: 29 August 1979 (age 46) Gävle, Sweden
- Height: 1.83 m (6 ft 0 in)
- Weight: 83 kg (183 lb)

Sport
- Sport: Table tennis
- Highest ranking: 19 (August 2003)
Medal record
Men's table tennis
Representing Sweden
European Championships
Gold medal – first place	2002 Zagreb	Team
Silver medal – second place	2011 Gdansk-Sopot	Team
Bronze medal – third place	2010 Ostrava	Doubles

Jens Mikael Lundqvist (born 29 August 1979) is a Swedish table tennis player who competed in the men's singles and men's team event at the 2008 Summer Olympics and the men's team event only at the 2012 Summer Olympics.

== Major League Table Tennis ==
Lundqvist signed with Major League Table Tennis for the 2024–25 season (Season 2) as part of a group of international additions to the league. He plays for the Portland Paddlers and debuted during the opening weekend of the season in September 2024.

In January 2026, during the 2025–26 season (Season 3), Lundqvist was named the MLTT Player of the Week for Week 9 after winning eight of nine games during a homestand in Portland. Following that weekend, he reached a league-leading power rating of 803.4, ranking him as the top player on the official MLTT power rankings list at that time. As of January 2026, he held an 80% singles win percentage for the season.
