= Oleksandr Didukh =

Ukrainian table tennis player

Oleksandr Didukh (born 12 February 1982) is a Ukrainian table tennis player. He competed for Ukraine at the 2012 Summer Olympics.
