= Marko Jevtović (table tennis) =

Serbian table tennis player

Medal record

Men's Table Tennis

Representing Serbia

European Championships
Silver medal – second place	2010 Subotica	Mixed Doubles

Universiade
Bronze medal – third place	2009 Belgrade	Doubles

Marko Jevtović (Serbian Cyrillic: Марко Јевтовић, born 5 January 1987 in Belgrade, SR Serbia, Yugoslavia) is a Serbian table tennis player. At the 2009 Summer Universiade, he won a bronze medal in the Men's doubles. He competed at the 2012 Summer Olympics in the Men's singles, but was defeated in the first round.
