= Pär Gerell =

Swedish table tennis player (born 1982)

Personal information
- Full name: Pär Håkan Gerell
- Nationality: Sweden
- Born: 23 June 1982 (age 44) Växjö, Sweden
- Height: 1.73 m (5 ft 8 in)
- Weight: 63 kg (139 lb; 9.9 st)

Sport
- Sport: Table tennis
- Club: Chartres ASTT
- Highest ranking: 27 (November 2016)
Medal record
Men's table tennis
Representing Sweden
European Championships
Silver medal – second place	2011 Gdansk-Sopot	Team
Bronze medal – third place	2010 Ostrava	Doubles
Bronze medal – third place	2014 Lisbon	Team
Bronze medal – third place	2015 Ekaterinburg	Singles

Pär Håkan Gerell (born 23 June 1982 in Växjö) is a Swedish table tennis player. He has been playing for French club Chartres ASTT since 2010. Based on his June 2011 world ranking, Gerell qualified for the London 2012 Olympic Games. He also competed at the 2008 Summer Olympics.

== Clubs ==
- until 2005: Falkenbergs BTK
- 2005–10: TTF Liebherr Ochsenhausen
- since 2010: Chartres ASTT

== Achievements ==
- Singles bronze 2015 European Championships
- Team silver 2011 European Championships
- Doubles bronze 2010 European Championships (with Jens Lundqvist)
- Doubles winner 2005 Brazil Open (with Jens Lundqvist)
