= Kirill Skachkov =

Russian table tennis player

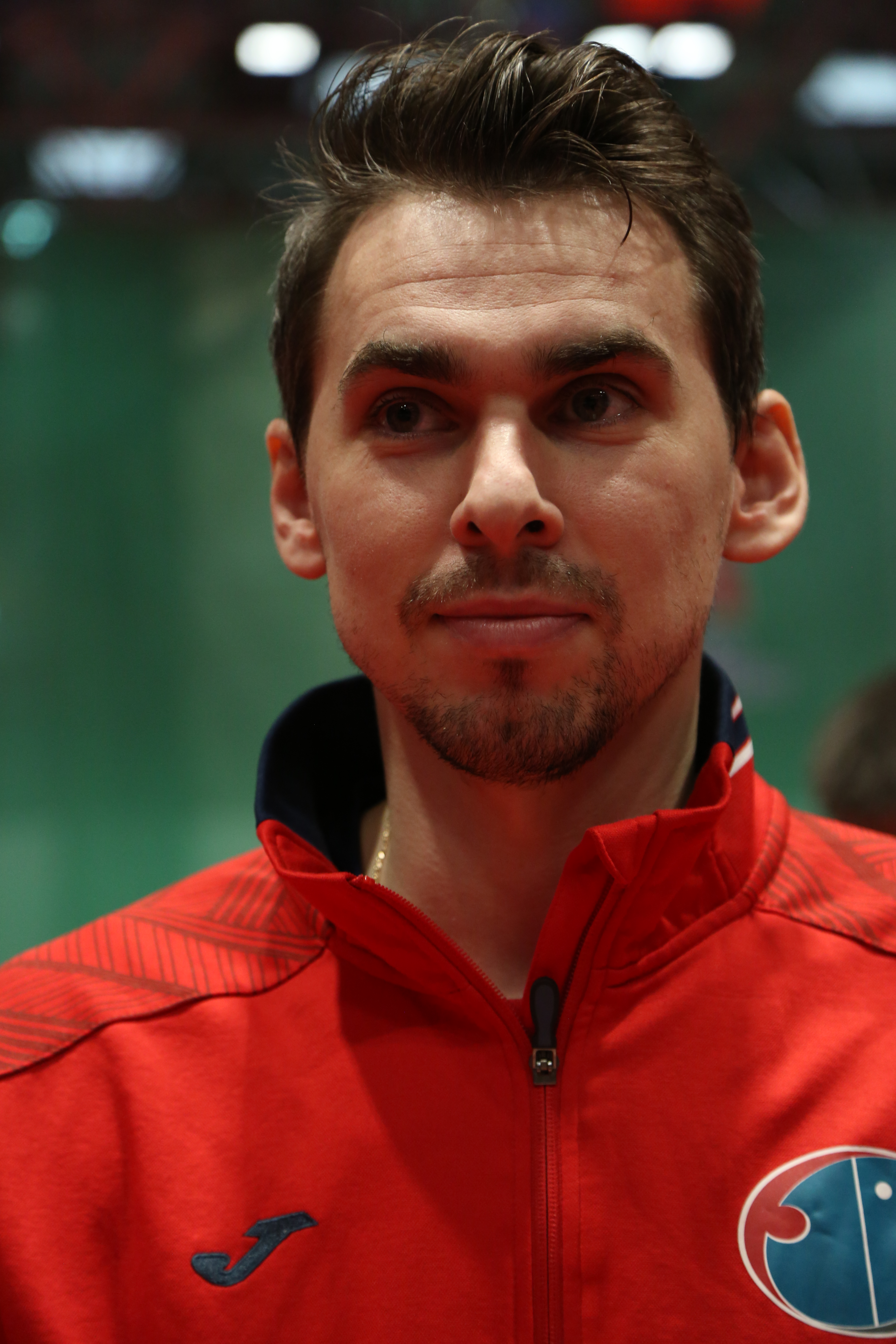

Personal information
- Full name: Kirill Sergeyevich Skachkov
- Nationality: (Russia) Russian
- Born: 6 August 1987 (age 39) Novokuznetsk, Kemerovo Oblast, RSFSR, USSR (now Russia)

Sport
- Sport: Table tennis
- Playing style: Right-handed shakehand grip
- Highest ranking: 29 (January 2012)
- Current ranking: 310 (28 September 2026)
Medal record
Men's table tennis
Representing Russia
European Championships
Silver medal – second place	2011 Gdansk-Sopot	Doubles
Bronze medal – third place	2015 Yekaterinburg	Doubles

Kirill Sergeyevich Skachkov (Russian: Кирилл Сергеевич Скачков; born 6 August 1987 in Novokuznetsk) is a Russian table tennis player. In 2011 he won a silver medal in the doubles event in the Table Tennis European Championships. He was part of the Russian men's team at the 2012 Summer Olympics.

== See also ==
- List of table tennis players
