= 2018 World Team Table Tennis Championships – Men's team =

Men's team at the 2018 World Team Table Tennis Championships
- Venue: Halmstad Arena
- Location: Halmstad, Sweden
- Dates: 29 April – 6 May
- Teams: 70

Medalists
gold medal	Fan Zhendong; Lin Gaoyuan; Ma Long; Wang Chuqin; Xu Xin	China
silver medal	Timo Boll; Ruwen Filus; Patrick Franziska; Dimitrij Ovtcharov; Bastian Steger	Germany
bronze medal	Jang Woo-jin; Jung Young-sik; Kim Dong-hyun; Lee Sang-su; Lim Jong-hoon	South Korea
bronze medal	Anton Källberg; Kristian Karlsson; Mattias Karlsson; Truls Moregard; Jon Persson	Sweden

The men's team tournament of the 2018 World Team Table Tennis Championships was held from 29 April to 6 May 2018. The draw for the tournament was held at 27 February 2018.

China defeated Germany in the final to capture the gold medal.

== Championship division ==
=== Preliminary round ===
==== Group A ====
Pos	Team	Pld	W	L	MF	MA	MD	Pts	Qualification	Germany	Sweden	Hong Kong	Romania	Slovenia	Egypt
1	Germany	5	5	0	15	5	+10	10	Quarterfinals	—	3–0	3–1	3–0	3–2	3–2
2	Sweden	5	4	1	12	6	+6	9	Round of 16	—	—	—	3–0	3–1	3–0
3	Hong Kong	5	3	2	12	6	+6	8	Round of 16	—	2–3	—	3–2	3–0	3–0
4	Romania	5	2	3	8	7	+1	7		—	—	—	—	3–1	—
5	Slovenia	5	1	4	7	13	−6	6		—	—	—	—	—	—
6	Egypt	5	0	5	3	15	−12	5		—	—	—	0–3	1–3	—

Source: ITTF
Rules for classification: 1) Points; 2) Head-to-head points; 3) Head-to-head matches; 4) Head-to-head sets

29 April 2018; 13:00	Report	Germany	3–2	Egypt	Halmstad Arena, Halmstad
29 April 2018; 13:00	Report	Score by game:			Halmstad Arena, Halmstad
29 April 2018; 13:00	Report	Timo Boll	3–0	Mohamed El-Beiali	Halmstad Arena, Halmstad
Ruwen Filus			1–3	Omar Assar
Dimitrij Ovtcharov			3–1	Khalid Assar
Timo Boll			2–3	Omar Assar
Ruwen Filus			3–0	Mohamed El-Beiali
			–

29 April 2018; 13:00	Report	Hong Kong	3–0	Slovenia	Halmstad Arena, Halmstad
Score by game:
Wong Chun Ting	3–2	Darko Jorgic
Ho Kwan Kit	3–2	Bojan Tokič
Lam Siu Hang	3–1	Deni Kozul

29 April 2018; 13:00	Report	Sweden	3–0	Romania	Halmstad Arena, Halmstad
Score by game:
Kristian Karlsson	3–0	Ovidiu Ionescu
Mattias Karlsson	3–1	Hunor Szőcs
Jon Persson	3–2	Adrian Crișan

30 April 2018; 10:00	Report	Germany	3–0	Romania	Halmstad Arena, Halmstad
Score by game:
Patrick Franziska	3–0	Hunor Szőcs
Timo Boll	3–0	Cristian Pletea
Dimitrij Ovtcharov	3–0	Rareş Şipoş

30 April 2018; 10:00	Report	Hong Kong	2–3	Sweden	Halmstad Arena, Halmstad
30 April 2018; 10:00	Report	Score by game:			Halmstad Arena, Halmstad
30 April 2018; 10:00	Report	Wong Chun Ting	3–1	Jon Persson	Halmstad Arena, Halmstad
Ho Kwan Kit			2–3	Kristian Karlsson
Lam Siu Hang			1–3	Mattias Karlsson
Wong Chun Ting			3–1	Kristian Karlsson
Ho Kwan Kit			0–3	Jon Persson
			–

30 April 2018; 10:00	Report	Egypt	1–3	Slovenia	Halmstad Arena, Halmstad
Score by game:
Ahmed Saleh	2–3	Bojan Tokič
Omar Assar	3–2	Darko Jorgic
Mohamed El-Beiali	2–3	Deni Kozul
Omar Assar	0–3	Bojan Tokič

30 April 2018; 19:00	Report	Germany	3–0	Sweden	Halmstad Arena, Halmstad
Score by game:
Patrick Franziska	3–2	Kristian Karlsson
Timo Boll	3–0	Mattias Karlsson
Dimitrij Ovtcharov	3–1	Anton Källberg

30 April 2018; 19:00	Report	Hong Kong	3–0	Egypt	Halmstad Arena, Halmstad
Score by game:
Wong Chun Ting	3–0	Omar Assar
Ho Kwan Kit	3–0	Ahmed Saleh
Lam Siu Hang	3–0	El-sayed Lashin

30 April 2018; 19:00	Report	Romania	3–1	Slovenia	Halmstad Arena, Halmstad
Score by game:
Adrian Crișan	3–1	Bojan Tokič
Cristian Pletea	3–1	Darko Jorgic
Hunor Szőcs	1–3	Deni Kozul
Cristian Pletea	3–0	Bojan Tokič

1 May 2018; 16:00	Report	Germany	3–1	Hong Kong	Halmstad Arena, Halmstad
Score by game:
Timo Boll	3–0	Ho Kwan Kit
Patrick Franziska	2–3	Wong Chun Ting
Dimitrij Ovtcharov	3–0	Lam Siu Hang
Timo Boll	3–0	Wong Chun Ting

1 May 2018; 16:00	Report	Sweden	3–1	Slovenia	Halmstad Arena, Halmstad
Score by game:
Mattias Karlsson	3–0	Darko Jorgic
Kristian Karlsson	2–3	Bojan Tokič
Jon Persson	3–1	Deni Kozul
Mattias Karlsson	3–2	Bojan Tokič

1 May 2018; 16:00	Report	Egypt	0–3	Romania	Halmstad Arena, Halmstad
Score by game:
Ahmed Saleh	0–3	Cristian Pletea
El-sayed Lashin	0–3	Ovidiu Ionescu
Khalid Assar	0–3	Adrian Crișan

2 May 2018; 19:00	Report	Germany	3–2	Slovenia	Halmstad Arena, Halmstad
2 May 2018; 19:00	Report	Score by game:			Halmstad Arena, Halmstad
2 May 2018; 19:00	Report	Ruwen Filus	3–0	Deni Kozul	Halmstad Arena, Halmstad
Bastian Steger			3–0	Jan Žibrat
Dimitrij Ovtcharov			1–3	Darko Jorgic
Bastian Steger			1–3	Deni Kozul
Ruwen Filus			3–0	Jan Žibrat
			–

2 May 2018; 19:00	Report	Hong Kong	3–2	Romania	Halmstad Arena, Halmstad
2 May 2018; 19:00	Report	Score by game:			Halmstad Arena, Halmstad
2 May 2018; 19:00	Report	Wong Chun Ting	1–3	Hunor Szőcs	Halmstad Arena, Halmstad
Ho Kwan Kit			2–3	Ovidiu Ionescu
Lam Siu Hang			3–1	Cristian Pletea
Wong Chun Ting			3–2	Ovidiu Ionescu
Ho Kwan Kit			3–2	Hunor Szőcs
			–

2 May 2018; 19:00	Report	Sweden	3–0	Egypt	Halmstad Arena, Halmstad
Score by game:
Truls Moregard	3–2	Khalid Assar
Anton Källberg	3–0	Mohamed El-Beiali
Kristian Karlsson	3–0	Ahmed Saleh

==== Group B ====
Pos	Team	Pld	W	L	MF	MA	MD	Pts	Qualification	People's Republic of China	Brazil	Portugal	Czech Republic	Russia	North Korea
1	China	5	5	0	15	0	+15	10	Quarterfinals	—	3–0	3–0	3–0	3–0	3–0
2	Brazil	5	4	1	12	4	+8	9	Round of 16	—	—	—	3–1	3–0	3–0
3	Portugal	5	3	2	9	5	+4	8	Round of 16	—	0–3	—	3–1	3–0	3–0
4	Czech Republic	5	2	3	8	10	−2	7		—	—	—	—	—	3–0
5	Russia	5	1	4	4	14	−10	6		—	—	—	1–3	—	3–2
6	North Korea	5	0	5	2	15	−13	5		—	—	—	—	—	—

Source: ITTF
Rules for classification: 1) Points; 2) Head-to-head points; 3) Head-to-head matches; 4) Head-to-head sets

29 April 2018; 13:00	Report	China	3–0	Russia	Halmstad Arena, Halmstad
Score by game:
Fan Zhendong	3–0	Sadi Ismailov
Ma Long	3–0	Vladimir Sidorenko
Wang Chuqin	3–0	Vildan Gadiev

29 April 2018; 13:00	Report	Portugal	3–0	North Korea	Halmstad Arena, Halmstad
Score by game:
Marcos Freitas	3–2	Choe Il
Tiago Apolónia	3–2	Pak Sin-hyok
João Monteiro	3–0	Kang Wi-hun

29 April 2018; 13:00	Report	Brazil	3–1	Czech Republic	Halmstad Arena, Halmstad
Score by game:
Hugo Calderano	3–0	Lubomír Jančařík
Gustavo Tsuboi	3–1	Pavel Širůček
Eric Jouti	2–3	Tomáš Konečny
Hugo Calderano	3–0	Pavel Širůček

30 April 2018; 10:00	Report	China	3–0	Czech Republic	Halmstad Arena, Halmstad
Score by game:
Fan Zhendong	3–0	Lubomír Jančařík
Xu Xin	3–0	Tomas Tregler
Lin Gaoyuan	3–1	Tomáš Konečný

30 April 2018; 10:00	Report	Portugal	0–3	Brazil	Halmstad Arena, Halmstad
Score by game:
Marcos Freitas	2–3	Gustavo Tsuboi
João Monteiro	1–3	Hugo Calderano
Tiago Apolónia	2–3	Eric Jouti

30 April 2018; 10:00	Report	Russia	3–2	North Korea	Halmstad Arena, Halmstad
30 April 2018; 10:00	Report	Score by game:			Halmstad Arena, Halmstad
30 April 2018; 10:00	Report	Kirill Skachkov	3–0	Choe Il	Halmstad Arena, Halmstad
Vladimir Sidorenko			0–3	Pak Sin-hyok
Sadi Ismailov			2–3	Kang Wi-hun
Kirill Skachkov			3–2	Pak Sin-hyok
Vladimir Sidorenko			3–2	Choe Il
			–

30 April 2018; 19:00	Report	China	3–0	Brazil	Halmstad Arena, Halmstad
Score by game:
Fan Zhendong	3–0	Gustavo Tsuboi
Ma Long	3–0	Hugo Calderano
Xu Xin	3–0	Eric Jouti

30 April 2018; 19:00	Report	Portugal	3–0	Russia	Halmstad Arena, Halmstad
Score by game:
Marcos Freitas	3–0	Sadi Ismailov
Tiago Apolónia	3–1	Kirill Skachkov
João Monteiro	3–1	Vladimir Sidorenko

30 April 2018; 19:00	Report	Czech Republic	3–0	North Korea	Halmstad Arena, Halmstad
Score by game:
Lubomír Jančařík	3–0	Pak Sin-hyok
Tomas Tregler	3–1	Choe Il
Pavel Širůček	3–1	Kang Wi-hun

1 May 2018; 13:00	Report	China	3–0	Portugal	Halmstad Arena, Halmstad
Score by game:
Xu Xin	3–0	Diogo Carvalho
Fan Zhendong	3–2	João Geraldo
Lin Gaoyuan	3–0	Tiago Apolónia

1 May 2018; 13:00	Report	Brazil	3–0	North Korea	Halmstad Arena, Halmstad
Score by game:
Hugo Calderano	3–1	Pak Sin-hyok
Gustavo Tsuboi	3–2	Choe Il
Eric Jouti	3–1	Kang Wi-hun

1 May 2018; 13:00	Report	Russia	1–3	Czech Republic	Halmstad Arena, Halmstad
Score by game:
Vladimir Sidorenko	1–3	Pavel Širůček
Kirill Skachkov	2–3	Lubomír Jančařík
Vildan Gadiev	3–2	Tomáš Konečný
Vladimir Sidorenko	0–3	Lubomír Jančařík

2 May 2018; 10:00	Report	China	3–0	North Korea	Halmstad Arena, Halmstad
Score by game:
Ma Long	3–0	Choe Il
Fan Zhendong	3–0	Pak Sin-hyok
Xu Xin	3–0	Kang Wi-hun

2 May 2018; 10:00	Report	Portugal	3–1	Czech Republic	Halmstad Arena, Halmstad
Score by game:
João Geraldo	3–0	Lubomír Jančařík
Marcos Freitas	1–3	Pavel Širůček
João Monteiro	3–2	Tomáš Konečný
Marcos Freitas	3–1	Lubomír Jančařík

2 May 2018; 10:00	Report	Brazil	3–0	Russia	Halmstad Arena, Halmstad
Score by game:
Gustavo Tsuboi	3–1	Vildan Gadiev
Hugo Calderano	3–0	Sadi Ismailov
Eric Jouti	3–1	Denis Ivonin

==== Group C ====
Pos	Team	Pld	W	L	MF	MA	MD	Pts	Qualification	England	Japan	Chinese Taipei for Olympic games	Belgium	Belarus	Singapore
1	England	5	5	0	15	3	+12	10	Quarterfinals	—	—	—	3–1	3–0	3–0
2	Japan	5	4	1	13	3	+10	9	Round of 16	1–3	—	3–0	3–0	3–0	3–0
3	Chinese Taipei	5	3	2	10	8	+2	8	Round of 16	1–3	—	—	3–0	3–2	3–0
4	Belgium	5	2	3	7	13	−6	7		—	—	—	—	3–2	3–2
5	Belarus	5	1	4	7	12	−5	6		—	—	—	—	—	3–0
6	Singapore	5	0	5	2	15	−13	5		—	—	—	—	—	—

Source: ITTF
Rules for classification: 1) Points; 2) Head-to-head points; 3) Head-to-head matches; 4) Head-to-head sets

29 April 2018; 17:00	Report	Japan	3–0	Belgium	Halmstad Arena, Halmstad
Score by game:
Koki Niwa	3–0	Cédric Nuytinck
Tomokazu Harimoto	3–0	Florent Lambiet
Kenta Matsudaira	3–1	Robin Devos

29 April 2018; 17:00	Report	Chinese Taipei	3–0	Singapore	Halmstad Arena, Halmstad
Score by game:
Chen Chien-an	3–1	Gao Ning
Chuang Chih-yuan	3–0	Ethan Poh-Shao Feng
Lin Yun-Ju	3–0	Pang Xue Jie

29 April 2018; 17:00	Report	England	3–0	Belarus	Halmstad Arena, Halmstad
Score by game:
Paul Drinkhall	3–0	Pavel Platonov
Liam Pitchford	3–0	Vladimir Samsonov
Sam Walker	3–1	Aliaksandr Khanin

30 April 2018; 10:00	Report	Japan	3–0	Belarus	Halmstad Arena, Halmstad
Score by game:
Tomokazu Harimoto	3–2	Vladimir Samsonov
Koki Niwa	3–2	Pavel Platonov
Jun Mizutani	3–0	Aliaksandr Khanin

30 April 2018; 10:00	Report	Chinese Taipei	1–3	England	Halmstad Arena, Halmstad
Score by game:
Chuang Chih-yuan	2–3	Paul Drinkhall
Chen Chien-an	1–3	Liam Pitchford
Lin Yun-Ju	3–1	Sam Walker
Chuang Chih-yuan	0–3	Liam Pitchford

30 April 2018; 10:00	Report	Belgium	3–2	Singapore	Halmstad Arena, Halmstad
30 April 2018; 10:00	Report	Score by game:			Halmstad Arena, Halmstad
30 April 2018; 10:00	Report	Cédric Nuytinck	3–0	Ethan Poh-Shao Feng	Halmstad Arena, Halmstad
Florent Lambiet			2–3	Gao Ning
Robin Devos			3–0	Kun Ting Beh
Cédric Nuytinck			1–3	Gao Ning
Florent Lambiet			3–1	Ethan Poh-Shao Feng
			–

30 April 2018; 19:00	Report	Japan	1–3	England	Halmstad Arena, Halmstad
Score by game:
Jun Mizutani	3–2	Paul Drinkhall
Tomokazu Harimoto	0–3	Liam Pitchford
Koki Niwa	0–3	Sam Walker
Jun Mizutani	2–3	Liam Pitchford

30 April 2018; 19:00	Report	Chinese Taipei	3–0	Belgium	Halmstad Arena, Halmstad
Score by game:
Chuang Chih-yuan	3–1	Florent Lambiet
Chen Chien-an	3–1	Cédric Nuytinck
Liao Cheng-ting	3–0	Martin Allegro

30 April 2018; 19:00	Report	Belarus	3–0	Singapore	Halmstad Arena, Halmstad
Score by game:
Vladimir Samsonov	3–0	Kun Ting Beh
Pavel Platonov	3–1	Ethan Poh-Shao Feng
Aliaksandr Khanin	3–0	Lucas Tan

1 May 2018; 13:00	Report	Japan	3–0	Chinese Taipei	Halmstad Arena, Halmstad
Score by game:
Tomokazu Harimoto	3–1	Chuang Chih-yuan
Jun Mizutani	3–0	Chen Chien-an
Kenta Matsudaira	3–1	Lin Yun-Ju

1 May 2018; 13:00	Report	England	3–0	Singapore	Halmstad Arena, Halmstad
Score by game:
Paul Drinkhall	3–1	Ethan Poh-Shao Feng
Liam Pitchford	3–0	Pang Xue Jie
Sam Walker	3–1	Kun Ting Beh

1 May 2018; 13:00	Report	Belgium	3–2	Belarus	Halmstad Arena, Halmstad
1 May 2018; 13:00	Report	Score by game:			Halmstad Arena, Halmstad
1 May 2018; 13:00	Report	Florent Lambiet	0–3	Vladimir Samsonov	Halmstad Arena, Halmstad
Cédric Nuytinck			3–0	Pavel Platonov
Robin Devos			3–2	Aliaksandr Khanin
Cédric Nuytinck			0–3	Vladimir Samsonov
Florent Lambiet			3–1	Pavel Platonov
			–

2 May 2018; 10:00	Report	Japan	3–0	Singapore	Halmstad Arena, Halmstad
Score by game:
Tomokazu Harimoto	3–0	Gao Ning
Jun Mizutani	3–0	Ethan Poh-Shao Feng
Yuya Oshima	3–0	Kun Ting Beh

2 May 2018; 10:00	Report	Chinese Taipei	3–2	Belarus	Halmstad Arena, Halmstad
2 May 2018; 10:00	Report	Score by game:			Halmstad Arena, Halmstad
2 May 2018; 10:00	Report	Chen Chien-an	1–3	Vladimir Samsonov	Halmstad Arena, Halmstad
Chuang Chih-yuan			2–3	Pavel Platonov
Liao Cheng-ting			3–1	Aliaksandr Khanin
Chuang Chih-yuan			3–1	Vladimir Samsonov
Chen Chien-an			3–1	Pavel Platonov
			–

2 May 2018; 16:00	Report	England	3–1	Belgium	Halmstad Arena, Halmstad
Score by game:
Liam Pitchford	3–0	Florent Lambiet
Paul Drinkhall	1–3	Cédric Nuytinck
Sam Walker	3–1	Robin Devos
Liam Pitchford	3–0	Cédric Nuytinck

==== Group D ====
Pos	Team	Pld	W	L	MF	MA	MD	Pts	Qualification	South Korea	Austria	Croatia	France	India	Poland
1	South Korea	5	4	1	13	3	+10	9	Quarterfinals	—	3–0	1–3	—	3–0	3–0
2	Austria	5	3	2	9	8	+1	8 (Note: Austria 3 Pts, 0 MD, +3 SD; Croatia 3 Pts, 0 MD, +1 SD; France 3 Pts, 0 MD, −4 SD)	Round of 16	—	—	0–3	—	3–2	3–0
3	Croatia	5	3	2	11	7	+4	8	Round of 16	—	—	—	—	—	3–0
4	France	5	3	2	9	8	+1	8		0–3	0–3	3–0	—	3–2	3–0
5	India	5	2	3	10	13	−3	7		—	—	3–2	—	—	3–2
6	Poland	5	0	5	2	15	−13	5		—	—	—	—	—	—

Source: ITTF
Rules for classification: 1) Points; 2) Head-to-head points; 3) Head-to-head matches; 4) Head-to-head sets
Notes:

29 April 2018; 17:00	Report	France	3–2	India	Halmstad Arena, Halmstad
29 April 2018; 17:00	Report	Score by game:			Halmstad Arena, Halmstad
29 April 2018; 17:00	Report	Simon Gauzy	3–0	Sathiyan Gnanasekaran	Halmstad Arena, Halmstad
Emmanuel Lebesson			1–3	Sharath Kamal
Quentin Robinot			3–2	Anthony Amalraj
Simon Gauzy			1–3	Sharath Kamal
Emmanuel Lebesson			3–1	Sathiyan Gnanasekaran
			–

29 April 2018; 17:00	Report	South Korea	3–0	Poland	Halmstad Arena, Halmstad
Score by game:
Jung Young-sik	3–2	Jakub Dyjas
Lee Sang-su	3–1	Paweł Fertikowski
Jang Woo-jin	3–1	Marek Badowski

29 April 2018; 17:00	Report	Croatia	3–0	Austria	Halmstad Arena, Halmstad
Score by game:
Tomislav Pucar	3–1	Stefan Fegerl
Andrej Gaćina	3–1	Robert Gardos
Frane Kojic	3–2	Daniel Habesohn

30 April 2018; 10:00	Report	France	3–0	Croatia	Halmstad Arena, Halmstad
Score by game:
Simon Gauzy	3–2	Tomislav Pucar
Emmanuel Lebesson	3–1	Andrej Gaćina
Quentin Robinot	3–2	Frane Kojic

30 April 2018; 10:00	Report	South Korea	3–0	Austria	Halmstad Arena, Halmstad
Score by game:
Lee Sang-su	3–2	Robert Gardos
Jung Young-sik	3–2	Stefan Fegerl
Jang Woo-jin	3–0	Daniel Habesohn

30 April 2018; 10:00	Report	India	3–2	Poland	Halmstad Arena, Halmstad
30 April 2018; 10:00	Report	Score by game:			Halmstad Arena, Halmstad
30 April 2018; 10:00	Report	Harmeet Desai	2–3	Jakub Dyjas	Halmstad Arena, Halmstad
Sharath Kamal			3–2	Paweł Fertikowski
Sathiyan Gnanasekaran			1–3	Marek Badowski
Sharath Kamal			3–1	Jakub Dyjas
Harmeet Desai			3–1	Paweł Fertikowski
			–

30 April 2018; 19:00	Report	Austria	3–0	France	Halmstad Arena, Halmstad
Score by game:
Stefan Fegerl	3–0	Emmanuel Lebesson
Daniel Habesohn	3–1	Simon Gauzy
Robert Gardos	3–0	Can Akkuzu

30 April 2018; 19:00	Report	South Korea	3–0	India	Halmstad Arena, Halmstad
Score by game:
Lee Sang-su	3–1	Harmeet Desai
Jung Young-sik	3–0	Anthony Amalraj
Jang Woo-jin	3–1	Sanil Shetty

30 April 2018; 19:00	Report	Croatia	3–0	Poland	Halmstad Arena, Halmstad
Score by game:
Andrej Gaćina	3–2	Jakub Dyjas
Tomislav Pucar	3–1	Marek Badowski
Frane Kojic	3–1	Patryk Zatówka

1 May 2018; 16:00	Report	South Korea	3–0	France	Halmstad Arena, Halmstad
Score by game:
Lee Sang-su	3–2	Emmanuel Lebesson
Jung Young-sik	3–1	Simon Gauzy
Jang Woo-jin	3–0	Quentin Robinot

1 May 2018; 16:00	Report	Austria	3–0	Poland	Halmstad Arena, Halmstad
Score by game:
Daniel Habesohn	3–0	Jakub Dyjas
Stefan Fegerl	3–1	Marek Badowski
Robert Gardos	3–0	Patryk Zatówka

1 May 2018; 16:00	Report	India	3–2	Croatia	Halmstad Arena, Halmstad
1 May 2018; 16:00	Report	Score by game:			Halmstad Arena, Halmstad
1 May 2018; 16:00	Report	Sharath Kamal	1–3	Andrej Gaćina	Halmstad Arena, Halmstad
Sathiyan Gnanasekaran			1–3	Tomislav Pucar
Harmeet Desai			3–2	Frane Kojic
Sathiyan Gnanasekaran			3–0	Andrej Gaćina
Sharath Kamal			3–2	Tomislav Pucar
			–

=== Knockout stage ===
The group winners of Groupd C and D were drawn, as well as the second and third placed teams. Same for the fourth, fifth and sixth placed teams.

==== Places 13–24 ====
Round of 16
Poland	1
Slovenia	3
India	3
Singapore	0
North Korea	3
Belarus	2
Russia	3
Egypt	1

Quarterfinals
Romania	3
Slovenia	2
India	3
France	2
Czech Republic	3
North Korea	2
Russia	3
Belgium	2

Semifinals
Romania	1
India	3
Czech Republic	3
Russia	2

Final

==== Places 1–12 ====
All times are local (UTC+2).

Round of 16
Croatia	2
Brazil	3
Japan	3
Hong Kong	0
Chinese Taipei	2
Sweden	3
Austria	3
Portugal	2

Quarterfinals
Germany	3
Brazil	1
Japan	1
South Korea	3
England	0
Sweden	3
Austria	0
China	3

Semifinals
Germany	3
South Korea	2
Sweden	0
China	3

Final
Germany	0
China	3

===== Round of 16 =====
3 May 2018; 13:00	Report	Japan	3–0	Hong Kong	Halmstad Arena, Halmstad
Score by game:
Tomokazu Harimoto	3–0	Wong Chun Ting
Jun Mizutani	3–1	Ho Kwan Kit
Koki Niwa	3–0	Lam Siu Hang

3 May 2018; 16:00	Report	Chinese Taipei	2–3	Sweden	Halmstad Arena, Halmstad
3 May 2018; 16:00	Report	Score by game:			Halmstad Arena, Halmstad
3 May 2018; 16:00	Report	Chuang Chih-yuan	0–3	Mattias Karlsson	Halmstad Arena, Halmstad
Chen Chien-an			0–3	Kristian Karlsson
Lin Yun-ju			3–2	Jon Persson
Chuang Chih-yuan			3–1	Kristian Karlsson
Chen Chien-an			1–3	Mattias Karlsson
			–

3 May 2018; 19:00	Report	Austria	3–2	Portugal	Halmstad Arena, Halmstad
3 May 2018; 19:00	Report	Score by game:			Halmstad Arena, Halmstad
3 May 2018; 19:00	Report	Robert Gardos	1–3	Tiago Apolónia	Halmstad Arena, Halmstad
Stefan Fegerl			1–3	Marcos Freitas
Daniel Habesohn			3–0	João Monteiro
Stefan Fegerl			3–0	Tiago Apolónia
Robert Gardos			3–1	Marcos Freitas
			–

3 May 2018; 19:00	Report	Croatia	2–3	Brazil	Halmstad Arena, Halmstad
3 May 2018; 19:00	Report	Score by game:			Halmstad Arena, Halmstad
3 May 2018; 19:00	Report	Andrej Gaćina	3–1	Gustavo Tsuboi	Halmstad Arena, Halmstad
Tomislav Pucar			1–3	Hugo Calderano
Frane Kojić			3–2	Eric Jouti
Andrej Gaćina			2–3	Hugo Calderano
Tomislav Pucar			2–3	Gustavo Tsuboi
			–

===== Quarterfinals =====
4 May 2018; 11:00	Report	China	3–0	Austria	Halmstad Arena, Halmstad
Score by game:
Ma Long	3–2	Robert Gardos
Xu Xin	3–0	Stefan Fegerl
Fan Zhendong	3–0	Daniel Habesohn

4 May 2018; 14:30	Report	Japan	1–3	South Korea	Halmstad Arena, Halmstad
Score by game:
Tomokazu Harimoto	2–3	Jung Young-sik
Jun Mizutani	3–2	Lee Sang-su
Kenta Matsudaira	1–3	Jang Woo-jin
Jun Mizutani	0–3	Jung Young-sik

4 May 2018; 18:00	Report	Germany	3–1	Brazil	Halmstad Arena, Halmstad
Score by game:
Bastian Steger	1–3	Hugo Calderano
Ruwen Filus	3–0	Eric Jouti
Dimitrij Ovtcharov	3–1	Gustavo Tsuboi
Ruwen Filus	3–2	Hugo Calderano

4 May 2018; 18:00	Report	England	0–3	Sweden	Halmstad Arena, Halmstad
Score by game:
Paul Drinkhall	0–3	Kristian Karlsson
Liam Pitchford	2–3	Mattias Karlsson
Sam Walker	0–3	Jon Persson

===== Semifinals =====
5 May 2018; 11:00	Report	Sweden	0–3	China	Halmstad Arena, Halmstad
Score by game:
Mattias Karlsson	0–3	Ma Long
Kristian Karlsson	1–3	Fan Zhendong
Jon Persson	0–3	Xu Xin

5 May 2018; 18:00	Report	Germany	3–2	South Korea	Halmstad Arena, Halmstad
5 May 2018; 18:00	Report	Score by game:			Halmstad Arena, Halmstad
5 May 2018; 18:00	Report	Patrick Franziska	1–3	Lee Sang-su	Halmstad Arena, Halmstad
Timo Boll			3–1	Jung Young-sik
Dimitrij Ovtcharov			0–3	Jang Woo-jin
Timo Boll			3–2	Lee Sang-su
Patrick Franziska			3–1	Jung Young-sik
			–

===== Final =====
6 May 2018; 14:30	Report	Germany	0–3	China	Halmstad Arena, Halmstad
Score by game:
Timo Boll	0–3	Ma Long
Ruwen Filus	0–3	Fan Zhendong
Patrick Franziska	1–3	Xu Xin

== Second division ==
=== Preliminary round ===
==== Group E ====
Pos	Team	Pld	W	L	MF	MA	MD	Pts	Qualification	Ukraine	Denmark	Netherlands	Thailand	Chile	Canada
1	Ukraine	5	5	0	15	2	+13	10	Quarterfinals	—	—	3–1	3–0	—	3–0
2	Denmark	5	4	1	13	4	+9	9	Round of 16	1–3	—	3–1	3–0	—	3–0
3	Netherlands	5	3	2	11	8	+3	8	Round of 16	—	—	—	—	—	3–0
4	Thailand	5	2	3	7	9	−2	7		—	—	1–3	—	—	3–0
5	Chile	5	1	4	4	13	−9	6		0–3	0–3	1–3	0–3	—	3–1
6	Canada	5	0	5	1	15	−14	5		—	—	—	—	—	—

Source: ITTF
Rules for classification: 1) Points; 2) Head-to-head points; 3) Head-to-head matches; 4) Head-to-head sets

==== Group F ====
Pos	Team	Pld	W	L	MF	MA	MD	Pts	Qualification	Slovakia	Nigeria	Argentina	Bulgaria	Turkey	Australia
1	Slovakia	5	5	0	15	4	+11	10	Quarterfinals	—	3–1	3–2	3–1	3–0	3–0
2	Nigeria	5	4	1	13	4	+9	9	Round of 16	—	—	—	3–0	3–0	3–0
3	Argentina	5	3	2	12	9	+3	8	Round of 16	—	1–3	—	3–1	3–2	3–0
4	Bulgaria	5	2	3	8	10	−2	7		—	—	—	—	—	—
5	Turkey	5	1	4	6	12	−6	6		—	—	—	1–3	—	—
6	Australia	5	0	5	0	15	−15	5		—	—	—	0–3	0–3	—

Source: ITTF
Rules for classification: 1) Points; 2) Head-to-head points; 3) Head-to-head matches; 4) Head-to-head sets

==== Group G ====
Pos	Team	Pld	W	L	MF	MA	MD	Pts	Qualification	Italy	Hungary	Greece	Serbia	Paraguay	Ecuador
1	Italy	5	4	1	14	6	+8	9 (Note: Italy 3 Pts, +1 MD; Hungary 3 Pts, 0 MD; Greece 3 Pts, −1 MD)	Quarterfinals	—	2–3	3–1	3–0	3–0	3–2
2	Hungary	5	4	1	14	7	+7	9	Round of 16	—	—	2–3	3–1	3–0	3–2
3	Greece	5	4	1	13	9	+4	9	Round of 16	—	—	—	3–2	3–2	3–0
4	Serbia	5	2	3	9	9	0	7		—	—	—	—	—	—
5	Paraguay	5	1	4	5	13	−8	6		—	—	—	0–3	—	3–1
6	Ecuador	5	0	5	5	15	−10	5		—	—	—	0–3	—	—

Source: ITTF
Rules for classification: 1) Points; 2) Head-to-head points; 3) Head-to-head matches; 4) Head-to-head sets

==== Group H ====
Pos	Team	Pld	W	L	MF	MA	MD	Pts	Qualification	Iran	United States	Spain	Kazakhstan	Luxembourg	Puerto Rico
1	Iran	5	4	1	14	5	+9	9 (Note: Iran 3–2 United States)	Quarterfinals	—	3–2	—	2–3	3–0	3–0
2	United States	5	4	1	14	7	+7	9	Round of 16	—	—	—	—	3–0	3–1
3	Spain	5	3	2	11	8	+3	8 (Note: Spain 3–2 Kazakhstan)	Round of 16	0–3	2–3	—	3–2	3–0	3–0
4	Kazakhstan	5	3	2	12	10	+2	8		—	1–3	—	—	3–1	3–1
5	Luxembourg	5	1	4	4	14	−10	6		—	—	—	—	—	3–2
6	Puerto Rico	5	0	5	4	15	−11	5		—	—	—	—	—	—

Source: ITTF
Rules for classification: 1) Points; 2) Head-to-head points; 3) Head-to-head matches; 4) Head-to-head sets

=== Knockout stage ===
The group winners of Groupd G and H were drawn, as well as the second and third placed teams. Same for the fourth, fifth and sixth placed teams.

==== Places 37–48 ====
Round of 16
Australia	0
Luxembourg	3
Chile	3
Ecuador	2
Puerto Rico	1
Paraguay	3
Turkey	3
Canada	2

Quarterfinals
Bulgaria	2
Luxembourg	3
Chile	0
Serbia	3
Kazakhstan	2
Paraguay	3
Turkey	3
Thailand	2

Semifinals
Luxembourg	0
Serbia	3
Paraguay	2
Turkey	3

Final

==== Places 25–36 ====
Round of 16
Greece	0
Denmark	3
United States	2
Netherlands	3
Argentina	0
Hungary	3
Nigeria	3
Spain	1

Quarterfinals
Ukraine	3
Denmark	1
Netherlands	0
Iran	3
Italy	1
Hungary	3
Nigeria	0
Slovakia	3

Semifinals
Ukraine	1
Iran	3
Hungary	3
Slovakia	2

Final
Iran	2
Hungary	3

== Third division ==
=== Preliminary round ===
==== Group I ====
Pos	Team	Pld	W	L	MF	MA	MD	Pts	Qualification	Mexico	Uzbekistan	Republic of the Congo	South Africa	Sri Lanka	New Zealand
1	Mexico	5	5	0	15	4	+11	10	Quarterfinals	—	3–2	3–1	3–0	3–0	3–1
2	Uzbekistan	5	4	1	14	6	+8	9	Round of 16	—	—	3–0	3–1	3–1	3–1
3	Republic of the Congo	5	3	2	10	10	0	8	Round of 16	—	—	—	3–1	—	—
4	South Africa	5	2	3	8	12	−4	7		—	—	—	—	—	—
5	Sri Lanka	5	1	4	8	14	−6	6		—	—	2–3	2–3	—	—
6	New Zealand	5	0	5	6	15	−9	5		—	—	1–3	1–3	2–3	—

Source: ITTF
Rules for classification: 1) Points; 2) Head-to-head points; 3) Head-to-head matches; 4) Head-to-head sets

==== Group J ====
Pos	Team	Pld	W	L	MF	MA	MD	Pts	Qualification	Indonesia	Cuba	Vietnam	Tunisia	Peru	Pakistan
1	Indonesia	3	2	1	7	6	+1	5 (Note: Indonesia 3 Pts, 0 MD, +3 SD; Cuba 3 Pts, 0 MD, −1 SD; Vietnam 3 Pts, 0 MD, −2 SD)	Quarterfinals	—	—	3–1	3–2	—	—
2	Cuba	3	2	1	7	6	+1	5	Round of 16	3–1	—	1–3	3–2	—	—
3	Vietnam	3	2	1	7	5	+2	5	Round of 16	—	—	—	3–1	—	—
4	Tunisia	3	0	3	5	9	−4	3		—	—	—	—	—	—
5	Peru	0	0	0	0	0	0	0	Withdrawn	—	—	—	—	—	—
6	Pakistan (Note: Pakistan withdrew as the team did not get a NOC from the Pakistan Sports Board (PSB).)	0	0	0	0	0	0	0	Withdrawn	—	—	—	—	—	—

Source: ITTF
Rules for classification: 1) Points; 2) Head-to-head points; 3) Head-to-head matches; 4) Head-to-head sets

==== Group K ====
Pos	Team	Pld	W	L	MF	MA	MD	Pts	Qualification	Switzerland	Saudi Arabia	Lithuania	Jordan	Togo	Algeria
1	Switzerland	5	4	1	14	7	+7	9 (Note: Switzerland 3 Pts, +1 MD; Saudi Arabia 3 Pts, 0 MD; Lithuania 3 Pts, −1 MD)	Quarterfinals	—	—	—	3–2	3–0	3–1
2	Saudi Arabia	5	4	1	14	6	+8	9	Round of 16	3–2	—	2–3	3–0	3–1	3–0
3	Lithuania	5	4	1	13	10	+3	9	Round of 16	1–3	—	—	3–2	3–1	3–2
4	Jordan	5	1	4	9	13	−4	6 (Note: Jordan 3 Pts, +1 MD; Togo 3 Pts, −0 MD; Algeria 3 Pts, −1 MD)		—	—	—	—	3–1	—
5	Togo	5	1	4	6	13	−7	6		—	—	—	—	—	—
6	Algeria	5	1	4	7	14	−7	6		—	—	—	3–2	1–3	—

Source: ITTF
Rules for classification: 1) Points; 2) Head-to-head points; 3) Head-to-head matches; 4) Head-to-head sets

==== Group L ====
Pos	Team	Pld	W	L	MF	MA	MD	Pts	Qualification	Finland	Israel	Malaysia	Dominican Republic	Macau	Guatemala
1	Finland	5	4	1	14	3	+11	9 (Note: Finland 3 Pts, +2 MD; Israel 3 Pts, 0 MD; Malaysia 3 Pts, −2 MD)	Quarterfinals	—	3–0	—	—	—	—
2	Israel	5	4	1	12	5	+7	9	Round of 16	—	—	—	—	—	—
3	Malaysia	5	4	1	12	6	+6	9	Round of 16	3–2	0–3	—	3–1	3–0	3–0
4	Dominican Republic	5	2	3	9	10	−1	7		0–3	2–3	—	—	3–1	3–0
5	Macau	5	1	4	4	14	−10	6		0–3	0–3	—	—	—	—
6	Guatemala	5	0	5	2	15	−13	5		0–3	0–3	—	—	2–3	—

Source: ITTF
Rules for classification: 1) Points; 2) Head-to-head points; 3) Head-to-head matches; 4) Head-to-head sets

=== Knockout stage ===
The group winners of Groupd K and L were drawn, as well as the second and third placed teams. Same for the fourth, fifth and sixth placed teams.

==== Places 61–72 ====
Round of 16
New Zealand	2
Algeria	3
Guatemala	1
Sri Lanka	3

Quarterfinals
Dominican Republic	2
Algeria	3
Macau	1
Tunisia	3
Jordan	2
Sri Lanka	3
Togo	3
South Africa	1

Semifinals
Algeria	1
Tunisia	3
Sri Lanka	2
Togo	3

Final

==== Places 49–60 ====
Round of 16
Lithuania	3
Cuba	1
Uzbekistan	2
Malaysia	3
Vietnam	3
Saudi Arabia	1
Israel	3
Republic of the Congo	0

Quarterfinals
Mexico	1
Lithuania	3
Malaysia	3
Switzerland	1
Finland	1
Vietnam	3
Israel	3
Indonesia	2

Semifinals
Lithuania	3
Malaysia	1
Vietnam	3
Israel	1

Final
Lithuania	3
Vietnam	0

57th place bracket

Semifinals
Cuba	3
Uzbekistan	2
Saudi Arabia	3
Republic of the Congo	1

Final
