= 2022 European Table Tennis Championships – Mixed doubles =

Mixed doubles at the 2022 European Table Tennis Championships
- Venue: Rudi-Sedlmayer-Halle
- Location: Munich, Germany
- Dates: 13–15 August
- Competitors: 122 from 38 nations

Medalists
gold medal	Emmanuel Lebesson (FRA); Jia Nan Yuan (FRA)
silver medal	Ovidiu Ionescu (ROU); Bernadette Szőcs (ROU)
bronze medal	Ľubomír Pištej (SVK); Barbora Balážová (SVK)
bronze medal	Robert Gardos (AUT); Sofia Polcanova (AUT)

The mixed doubles competition of the 2022 European Table Tennis Championships was held from 13 to 15 August 2022.

== Playing system ==
World XD ranking week 28; 12.07.2022.
58 pairs
16 pairs are directly qualified for the main draw as a seeded pairs.
Qualification stage: 42 pairs will play qualification in two preliminary rounds. The winners of the preliminary round 2 matches will qualify for the Main draw.

== Preliminary round ==
The winners of the preliminary round 2 matches will qualify for the Main draw.

First round
F Giardi (SMR); D Biogradlić (BIH)	0
T Alexandrov (BUL); P Trifonova (BUL)	3
V Ursu (MDA); A Chiriacova (MDA)	3
A Reinholds (LAT); B Bogdanova (LAT)	0
D Kogans (LAT); R Betz (FIN)	1
A Smirnov (EST); R Hanson (EST)	3
I Navickas (LTU); E Riliškytė (LTU)	0
M Yiangou (CYP); F Meletie (CYP)	3
M Frøseth (NOR); M Toftaker (NOR)	0
K Konstantinopoulos (GRE); E Terpou (GRE)	3
E Gutić (BIH); H Mešetović (BIH)	1
M Andersen (DEN); I Matos (POR)	3
F Karabaxhak (KOS); L Zeqiri (KOS)	1
I Nielsen (GRL); S Musajeva (LAT)	3
I Pryshchepa (UKR); T Bilenko (UKR)	3
L Stoll (SUI); S Men (NED)	0
K Žeimys (LTU); K Riliškytė (LTU)	0
P Krastev (BUL); M Yovkova (BUL)	3
M Mongiusti (SMR); P Santos (POR)	0
L Mladenovic (LUX); X Ni (LUX)	3
T Libene (EST); A Avameri (EST)	3
F Mladenovski (MKD); A Uce-Nikolov (MKD)	0
G Konstantinopoulos (GRE); A Toliou (GRE)	3
A Naumi (FIN); A Kirichenko (FIN)	1
M Tauber (ISR); M Degraef (BEL)	1
C Caballero (ESP); SX Zhang (ESP)	3

Second round
İ Gündüz (TUR); S Altinkaya (TUR)	3
T Alexandrov (BUL); P Trifonova (BUL)	1
V Ursu (MDA); A Chiriacova (MDA)	1
F Zeljko (CRO); M Jeger (CRO)	3
B Haug (NOR); R Carlsen (NOR)	3
A Smirnov (EST); R Hanson (EST)	0
M Yiangou (CYP); F Meletie (CYP)	0
A Limonov (UKR); S Brateyko (UKR)	3
J Piccolin (ITA); D Vivarelli (ITA)	1
B Duda (GER); S Winter (GER)	3
K Konstantinopoulos (GRE); E Terpou (GRE)	3
P Hribar (SLO); A Tofant (SLO)	1
J Majoros (HUN); L Hartbrich (HUN)	0
M Andersen (DEN); I Matos (POR)	3
I Nielsen (GRL); S Musajeva (LAT)	0
B Oláh (FIN); B Eerland (NED)	3
D Habesohn (AUT); E Samara (ROU)	3
I Pryshchepa (UKR); T Bilenko (UKR)	0
P Krastev (BUL); M Yovkova (BUL)	0
B Moullet (SUI); R Moret (SUI)	3
S Kulczycki (POL); K Węgrzyn (POL)	3
D Reitšpies (CZE); K Tomanovská (CZE)	0
L Mladenovic (LUX); X Ni (LUX)	3
L Jančařík (CZE); Z Blašková (CZE)	0
T Möregårdh (SWE); L Bergström (SWE)	3
T Libene (EST); A Avameri (EST)	2
A Puţuntică (MDA); H Arapović (CRO)	0
D Kožul (SLO); K Stražar (SLO)	3
T Jarvis (ENG); C Bardsley (ENG)	3
G Konstantinopoulos (GRE); A Toliou (GRE)	0
C Caballero (ESP); SX Zhang (ESP)	3
A Karakašević (SRB); S Šurjan (SRB)	2

== Main Draw ==
Results

Round of 32
1	E Lebesson (FRA); J Yuan (FRA)	3
K Konstantinopoulos (GRE); E Terpou (GRE)	0
D Habesohn (AUT); E Samara (ROU)	3
12	AT Yiğenler (TUR); Ö Yılmaz (TUR)	0
15	K Karlsson (SWE); C Källberg (SWE)	1
D Kožul (SLO); K Stražar (SLO)	3
B Haug (NOR); R Carlsen (NOR)	0
8	N Ecseki (HUN); D Madarász (HUN)	3
5	Ľ Pištej (SVK); B Balážová (SVK)	3
M Andersen (DEN); I Matos (POR)	2
B Duda (GER); S Winter (GER)	3
9	E Glod (LUX); S De Nutte (LUX)	1
12	J Dyjas (POL); N Partyka (POL)	3
İ Gündüz (TUR); S Altinkaya (TUR)	0
B Moullet (SUI); R Moret (SUI)	1
4	Á Robles (ESP); M Xiao (ESP)	3
3	D Qiu (GER); N Mittelham (GER)	3
T Möregårdh (SWE); L Bergström (SWE)	2
T Jarvis (ENG); C Bardsley (ENG)	1
10	R Gardos (AUT); S Polcanova (AUT)	3
14	Y Wang (SVK); T Kukuľková (SVK)	3
B Oláh (FIN); B Eerland (NED)	1
F Zeljko (CRO); M Jeger (CRO)	0
6	S Gauzy (FRA); P Pavade (FRA)	3
7	D Levajac (SRB); I Lupulesku (SRB)	3
C Caballero (ESP); SX Zhang (ESP)	1
S Kulczycki (POL); K Węgrzyn (POL)	3
16	L Pitchford (ENG); TT Ho (ENG)	2
11	N Stoyanov (ITA); G Piccolin (ITA)	2
L Mladenovic (LUX); X Ni (LUX)	3
A Limonov (UKR); S Brateyko (UKR)	1
2	O Ionescu (ROU); B Szőcs (ROU)	3

Round of 16
1	E Lebesson (FRA); J Yuan (FRA)	3
D Habesohn (AUT); E Samara (ROU)	0
D Kožul (SLO); K Stražar (SLO)	2
8	N Ecseki (HUN); D Madarász (HUN)	3
5	Ľ Pištej (SVK); B Balážová (SVK)	3
B Duda (GER); S Winter (GER)	0
12	J Dyjas (POL); N Partyka (POL)	0
4	Á Robles (ESP); M Xiao (ESP)	3
3	D Qiu (GER); N Mittelham (GER)	1
10	R Gardos (AUT); S Polcanova (AUT)	3
14	Y Wang (SVK); T Kukuľková (SVK)	0
6	S Gauzy (FRA); P Pavade (FRA)	3
7	D Levajac (SRB); I Lupulesku (SRB)	1
S Kulczycki (POL); K Węgrzyn (POL)	3
L Mladenovic (LUX); X Ni (LUX)	1
2	O Ionescu (ROU); B Szőcs (ROU)	3

Quarterfinals
1	E Lebesson (FRA); J Yuan (FRA)	3
8	N Ecseki (HUN); D Madarász (HUN)	2
5	Ľ Pištej (SVK); B Balážová (SVK)	3
4	Á Robles (ESP); M Xiao (ESP)	2
10	R Gardos (AUT); S Polcanova (AUT)	3
6	S Gauzy (FRA); P Pavade (FRA)	1
S Kulczycki (POL); K Węgrzyn (POL)	1
2	O Ionescu (ROU); B Szőcs (ROU)	3

Semifinals
1	E Lebesson (FRA); J Yuan (FRA)	3
5	Ľ Pištej (SVK); B Balážová (SVK)	0
10	R Gardos (AUT); S Polcanova (AUT)	2
2	O Ionescu (ROU); B Szőcs (ROU)	3

Final
1	E Lebesson (FRA); J Yuan (FRA)	3
2	O Ionescu (ROU); B Szőcs (ROU)	1

== Participating nations ==
122 players from 38 nations.

- Austria (3)
- Belgium (1)
- Bosnia and Herzegovina (3)
- Bulgaria (4)
- Croatia (3)
- Cyprus (2)
- Czech Republic (4)
- Denmark (1)
- England (4)
- Estonia (4)
- Finland (4)
- France (4)
- Germany (4)
- Greece (4)
- Greenland (1)
- Hungary (4)
- Israel (1)
- Italy (4)
- Kosovo (2)
- Latvia (4)
- Lithuania (4)
- Luxembourg (4)
- Moldova (3)
- Netherlands (2)
- North Macedonia (2)
- Norway (4)
- Poland (4)
- Portugal (2)
- Romania (3)
- San Marino (2)
- Serbia (4)
- Slovakia (4)
- Slovenia (4)
- Spain (4)
- Sweden (4)
- Switzerland (3)
- Turkey (4)
- Ukraine (4)
