= 2022 North European Table Tennis Championships =

- Date: 5–7 August 2022
- Location: Druskininkai, Lithuania
- Venue: Druskininkai Sports Complex

Champions

Men's singles
- (Sweden) Simon Berglund

Women's singles
- (Norway) Rebekka Carlsen

Men's doubles
- (Sweden) Söderlund/Berglund

Women's doubles
- (Sweden) Holgersson/Edvinsson

Mixed doubles
- (Sweden) Friis/Edvinsson

Men's team
- Sweden

Women's team
- Sweden
← 2018 ·	North European Table Tennis Championships	· 2024 →

The North European Table Tennis Championships 2022 were played in Druskininkai, Lithuania from 5 to 7 August 2022. Lithuania hosted championships for the first time after 20 years gap, previously hosting championships in 2002.

== Participating nations ==
- Denmark (7)
- Estonia (7)
- Finland (7)
- Greenland (4)
- Latvia (11)
- Lithuania (20)
- Norway (8)
- Sweden (7)

== Medal summary ==
=== Medal table ===
* Host nation (Lithuania)

Rank	Nation	Gold	Silver	Bronze	Total
1	Sweden	6	4	1	11
2	Norway	1	1	0.5	2.5
3	Lithuania*	0	1	4	5
4	Denmark	0	1	2	3
5	Finland	0	0	2.5	2.5
6	Estonia	0	0	1	1
6	Latvia	0	0	1	1
Totals (7 entries)		7	7	12	26

=== Medallists ===
Event	Gold	Silver	Bronze
Men's singles	Simon Berglund (SWE)	Hampus Söderlund (SWE)	Tobias Rasmussen (DEN)
Men's singles	Simon Berglund (SWE)	Hampus Söderlund (SWE)	Jonatan McDonald (SWE)
Women's singles	Rebekka Carlsen (NOR)	Jennie Edvinsson (SWE)	Emilija Riliškytė (LTU)
Women's singles	Rebekka Carlsen (NOR)	Jennie Edvinsson (SWE)	Kornelija Riliškytė (LTU)
Men's doubles	Sweden; Hampus Söderlund; Simon Berglund	Sweden; Martis Friis; Jonatan McDonald	Latvia; Olegs Kartuzovs; Aleksandrs Maskalonoks
Men's doubles	Sweden; Hampus Söderlund; Simon Berglund	Sweden; Martis Friis; Jonatan McDonald	Denmark; Martin Buch Andersen; Tobias Rasmussen
Women's doubles	Sweden; Hannah Holgersson; Jennie Edvinsson	Lithuania; Emilija Riliškytė; Kornelija Riliškytė	Finland; Marina Donner; Anna Kirichenko
Women's doubles	Sweden; Hannah Holgersson; Jennie Edvinsson	Lithuania; Emilija Riliškytė; Kornelija Riliškytė	Mixed Team (Norway) Aida Dahlen (Finland) Ramona Betz
Mixed doubles	Sweden; Martis Friis; Jennie Edvinsson	Sweden; Jonatan McDonald; Alma Rööse	Lithuania; Kęstutis Žeimys; Kornelija Riliškytė
Mixed doubles	Sweden; Martis Friis; Jennie Edvinsson	Sweden; Jonatan McDonald; Alma Rööse	Finland; Arttu Pihkala; Anna Kirichenko
Men's team	Sweden; Hampus Söderlund; Martis Friis; Jonatan McDonald	Denmark; Emil Friis-Hansen; Martin Buch Andersen; Dominykas Samuolis; Tobias Rasmussen	Lithuania; Kęstutis Žeimys; Ignas Navickas; Andrius Preidžius; Lukas Rimkus
Women's team	Sweden; Alma Rööse; Hannah Holgersson; Jennie Edvinsson	Norway; Rebekka Carlsen; Rikke Skåttet; Marte Aasebø; Aida Dahlen	Estonia; Reelica Hanson; Vitalia Reinol; Alina Jagnenkova
