= 2018 World Team Table Tennis Championships – Women's team =

Women's team at the 2018 World Team Table Tennis Championships
- Venue: Halmstad Arena
- Location: Halmstad, Sweden
- Dates: 29 April–5 May
- Teams: 70

Medalists
gold medal	Chen Meng; Ding Ning; Liu Shiwen; Wang Manyu; Zhu Yuling	China
silver medal	Hina Hayata; Miu Hirano; Kasumi Ishikawa; Mima Ito; Miyu Nagasaki	Japan
bronze medal	Doo Hoi Kem; Lee Ho Ching; Mak Tze Wing; Ng Wing Nam; Soo Wai Yam Minnie	Hong Kong
bronze medal	Cha Hyo-sim; Choe Hyon-hwa; Jeon Ji-hee; Kim Ji-ho; Kim Nam-hae; Kim Song-i; Seo Hyo-won; Yang Ha-eun; Yoo Eun-chong	Korea

The women's team tournament of the 2018 World Team Table Tennis Championships was held from 29 April to 6 May 2018. The draw for the tournament was held on 27 February 2018.

China won the title after defeating Japan in the final.

== Championship division ==
=== Preliminary round ===
==== Group A ====
Pos	Team	Pld	W	L	MF	MA	MD	Pts	Qualification	People's Republic of China	Singapore	Russia	Sweden	Belarus	India
1	China	5	5	0	15	1	+14	10	Quarterfinals	—	3–1	3–0	3–0	3–0	3–0
2	Singapore	5	4	1	13	5	+8	9	Round of 16	—	—	3–0	3–2	3–0	3–0
3	Russia	5	3	2	8	9	−1	8	Round of 16	—	—	—	3–2	3–2	3–1
4	Sweden	5	2	3	10	11	−1	7		—	—	—	—	—	—
5	Belarus	5	1	4	6	12	−6	6		—	—	—	1–3	—	—
6	India	5	0	5	2	15	−13	5		—	—	—	1–3	0–3	—

Source: ITTF
Rules for classification: 1) Points; 2) Head-to-head points; 3) Head-to-head matches; 4) Head-to-head sets

==== Group B ====
Pos	Team	Pld	W	L	MF	MA	MD	Pts	Qualification	Japan	Austria	Ukraine	Hungary	United States	Egypt
1	Japan	5	5	0	15	0	+15	10	Quarterfinals	—	3–0	3–0	3–0	3–0	3–0
2	Austria	5	4	1	12	4	+8	9	Round of 16	—	—	3–0	3–1	3–0	3–0
3	Ukraine	5	3	2	9	8	+1	8	Round of 16	—	—	—	—	3–0	3–0
4	Hungary	5	2	3	9	9	0	7		—	—	2–3	—	3–2	3–0
5	United States	5	1	4	5	12	−7	6		—	—	—	—	—	—
6	Egypt	5	0	5	0	15	−15	5		—	—	—	—	0–3	—

Source: ITTF
Rules for classification: 1) Points; 2) Head-to-head points; 3) Head-to-head matches; 4) Head-to-head sets

==== Group C ====
Pos	Team	Pld	W	L	MF	MA	MD	Pts	Qualification	Romania	North Korea	Chinese Taipei for Olympic games	Netherlands	Poland	Czech Republic
1	Romania	5	4	1	13	6	+7	9 (Note: Romania 3–1 North Korea)	Quarterfinals	—	3–1	—	1–3	3–1	3–1
2	North Korea	5	4	1	13	6	+7	9	Round of 16	—	—	—	—	—	3–0
3	Chinese Taipei	5	3	2	11	9	+2	8	Round of 16	0–3	2–3	—	3–1	3–1	3–1
4	Netherlands	5	2	3	10	12	−2	7		—	1–3	—	—	3–2	2–3
5	Poland	5	1	4	7	14	−7	6 (Note: Poland 3–2 Czech Republic)		—	0–3	—	—	—	3–2
6	Czech Republic	5	1	4	7	14	−7	6		—	—	—	—	—	—

Source: ITTF
Rules for classification: 1) Points; 2) Head-to-head points; 3) Head-to-head matches; 4) Head-to-head sets

==== Group D ====
Pos	Team	Pld	W	L	MF	MA	MD	Pts	Qualification	South Korea	Hong Kong	Germany	Thailand	Luxembourg	Brazil
1	South Korea	5	5	0	15	4	+11	10	Quarterfinals	—	—	3–2	3–1	3–0	3–0
2	Hong Kong	5	3	2	12	8	+4	8 (Note: Hong Kong 3–1 Germany)	Round of 16	1–3	—	3–1	3–1	2–3	3–0
3	Germany	5	3	2	12	6	+6	8	Round of 16	—	—	—	3–1	3–0	3–0
4	Thailand	5	2	3	9	12	−3	7 (Note: Thailand 3–2 Luxembourg)		—	—	—	—	3–2	3–1
5	Luxembourg	5	2	3	8	11	−3	7		—	—	—	—	—	—
6	Brazil	5	0	5	2	15	−13	5		—	—	—	—	1–3	—

Source: ITTF
Rules for classification: 1) Points; 2) Head-to-head points; 3) Head-to-head matches; 4) Head-to-head sets

=== Knockout stage ===
The group winners of Groups C and D were drawn, as well as the second and third placed teams. Same for the fourth, fifth and sixth placed teams.

==== Places 13–24 ====
Round of 16
India	3
Luxembourg	1
Belarus	3
Egypt	1
Czech Republic	2
United States	3
Poland	3
Brazil	1

Quarterfinals
Hungary	3
India	0
Belarus	1
Netherlands	3
Thailand	2
United States	3
Poland	3
Sweden	2

Semifinals
Hungary	2
Netherlands	3
Poland	2
United States	3

Final

==== Places 1–12 ====
All times are local (UTC+2).

Round of 16
Germany	2
Austria	3
Hong Kong	3
Chinese Taipei	1
Russia	0
North Korea	3
Singapore	2
Ukraine	3

Quarterfinals
China	3
Austria	0
Hong Kong	3
Romania	0
South Korea
North Korea
Ukraine	0
Japan	3

Semifinals
China	3
Hong Kong	1
Korea	0
Japan	3

Final
China	3
Japan	1

===== Round of 16 =====
2 May 2018; 13:00	Report	Hong Kong	3–1	Chinese Taipei	Halmstad Arena, Halmstad
Score by game:
Minnie Soo Wai Yam	2–3	Cheng I-ching
Doo Hoi Kem	3–0	Liu Hsing-yin
Lee Ho Ching	3–0	Chen Szu-yu
Doo Hoi Kem	3–0	Cheng I-ching

2 May 2018; 13:00	Report	Singapore	2–3	Ukraine	Halmstad Arena, Halmstad
2 May 2018; 13:00	Report	Score by game:			Halmstad Arena, Halmstad
2 May 2018; 13:00	Report	Feng Tianwei	3–0	Tetyana Sorochynska	Halmstad Arena, Halmstad
Yu Mengyu			2–3	Ganna Gaponova
Lin Ye			1–3	Margaryta Pesotska
Feng Tianwei			3–0	Ganna Gaponova
Yu Mengyu			0–3	Tetyana Sorochynska
			–

2 May 2018; 16:00	Report	Germany	2–3	Austria	Halmstad Arena, Halmstad
2 May 2018; 16:00	Report	Score by game:			Halmstad Arena, Halmstad
2 May 2018; 16:00	Report	Sabine Winter	2–3	Sofia Polcanova	Halmstad Arena, Halmstad
Petrissa Solja			3–0	Liu Jia
Nina Mittelham			3–2	Amelie Solja
Petrissa Solja			2–3	Sofia Polcanova
Sabine Winter			2–3	Liu Jia
			–

2 May 2018; 16:00	Report	Russia	0–3	North Korea	Halmstad Arena, Halmstad
Score by game:
Yana Noskova	0–3	Kim Song-i
Polina Mikhailova	0–3	Kim Nam-hae
Mariia Tailakova	0–3	Cha Hyo-sim

===== Quarterfinals =====
3 May 2018; 10:00	Report	China	3–0	Austria	Halmstad Arena, Halmstad
Score by game:
Liu Shiwen	3–0	Sofia Polcanova
Chen Meng	3–0	Amelie Solja
Wang Manyu	3–0	Karoline Mischek

3 May 2018; 10:00	Report	South Korea	–	North Korea	Halmstad Arena, Halmstad

Before the match, both teams entered the stage together and decided not to play against each other. Meanwhile, a unified Korean team played in the semifinals. That move was agreed upon by the ITTF.

3 May 2018; 13:00	Report	Ukraine	0–3	Japan	Halmstad Arena, Halmstad
Score by game:
Margaryta Pesotska	2–3	Mima Ito
Tetyana Sorochynska	0–3	Kasumi Ishikawa
Ganna Gaponova	0–3	Miu Hirano

3 May 2018; 16:00	Report	Hong Kong	3–0	Romania	Halmstad Arena, Halmstad
Score by game:
Lee Ho Ching	3–1	Elizabeta Samara
Doo Hoi Kem	3–2	Bernadette Szőcs
Minnie Soo Wai Yam	3–0	Daniela Dodean

===== Semifinals =====
4 May 2018; 11:00	Report	Korea	0–3	Japan	Halmstad Arena, Halmstad
Score by game:
Jeon Ji-hee	0–3	Mima Ito
Kim Song-i	2–3	Kasumi Ishikawa
Yang Ha-eun	1–3	Miu Hirano

4 May 2018; 14:30	Report	China	3–1	Hong Kong	Halmstad Arena, Halmstad
Score by game:
Ding Ning	0–3	Minnie Soo Wai Yam
Zhu Yuling	3–2	Doo Hoi Kem
Liu Shiwen	3–1	Lee Ho Ching
Ding Ning	3–1	Doo Hoi Kem

===== Final =====
5 May 2018; 14:30	Report	China	3–1	Japan	Halmstad Arena, Halmstad
Score by game:
Liu Shiwen	2–3	Mima Ito
Ding Ning	3–0	Miu Hirano
Zhu Yuling	3–0	Kasumi Ishikawa
Liu Shiwen	3–0	Miu Hirano

== Second division ==
=== Preliminary round ===
==== Group E ====
Pos	Team	Pld	W	L	MF	MA	MD	Pts	Qualification	Slovakia	Croatia	France	Uzbekistan	Mexico	Colombia
1	Slovakia	5	5	0	15	3	+12	10	Quarterfinals	—	—	—	3–0	3–0	—
2	Croatia	5	4	1	13	5	+8	9	Round of 16	1–3	—	—	3–0	3–0	3–1
3	France	5	3	2	12	6	+6	8	Round of 16	2–3	1–3	—	3–0	3–0	3–0
4	Uzbekistan	5	2	3	6	10	−4	7		—	—	—	—	3–0	—
5	Mexico	5	1	4	3	14	−11	6		—	—	—	—	—	—
6	Colombia	5	0	5	4	15	−11	5		0–3	—	—	1–3	2–3	—

Source: ITTF
Rules for classification: 1) Points; 2) Head-to-head points; 3) Head-to-head matches; 4) Head-to-head sets

==== Group F ====
Pos	Team	Pld	W	L	MF	MA	MD	Pts	Qualification	Slovenia	Italy	Turkey	Greece	Belgium	Argentina
1	Slovenia	5	4	1	14	8	+6	9	Quarterfinals	—	—	3–2	3–1	—	—
2	Italy	5	3	2	12	8	+4	8 (Note: Turkey 3 Pts, +1 MD, +5 SD; Italy 3 Pts, +1 MD +2 SD, Greece 3 Pts, −2 MD, −5 SD)	Round of 16	2–3	—	1–3	3–0	3–0	3–2
3	Turkey	5	3	2	13	8	+5	8	Round of 16	—	—	—	2–3	—	—
4	Greece	5	3	2	10	11	−1	8		—	—	—	—	—	—
5	Belgium	5	2	3	8	13	−5	7		3–2	—	0–3	2–3	—	3–2
6	Argentina	5	0	5	6	15	−9	5		0–3	—	1–3	1–3	—	—

Source: ITTF
Rules for classification: 1) Points; 2) Head-to-head points; 3) Head-to-head matches; 4) Head-to-head sets

==== Group G ====
Pos	Team	Pld	W	L	MF	MA	MD	Pts	Qualification	Spain	Puerto Rico	Lithuania	Iran	Cuba	Australia
1	Spain	5	5	0	15	2	+13	10	Quarterfinals	—	3–1	3–0	3–0	3–1	3–0
2	Puerto Rico	5	4	1	13	5	+8	9	Round of 16	—	—	3–1	3–1	3–0	3–0
3	Lithuania	5	3	2	10	7	+3	8	Round of 16	—	—	—	—	3–0	—
4	Iran	5	2	3	8	10	−2	7		—	—	1–3	—	3–1	—
5	Cuba	5	1	4	5	14	−9	6		—	—	—	—	—	—
6	Australia	5	0	5	2	15	−13	5		—	—	0–3	0–3	2–3	—

Source: ITTF
Rules for classification: 1) Points; 2) Head-to-head points; 3) Head-to-head matches; 4) Head-to-head sets

==== Group H ====
Pos	Team	Pld	W	L	MF	MA	MD	Pts	Qualification	Serbia	Canada	Switzerland	England	Chile	Dominican Republic
1	Serbia	5	4	1	14	5	+9	9	Quarterfinals	—	3–2	—	—	—	3–0
2	Canada	5	3	2	13	8	+5	8 (Note: Canada 3 Pts, +1 MD; Switzerland 3 Pts, 0 MD; England 3 Pts, −1 MD)	Round of 16	—	—	—	—	—	—
3	Switzerland	5	3	2	12	11	+1	8	Round of 16	3–2	3–2	—	2–3	—	3–1
4	England	5	3	2	10	9	+1	8		0–3	1–3	—	—	—	3–0
5	Chile	5	2	3	7	10	−3	7		0–3	0–3	3–1	1–3	—	3–0
6	Dominican Republic	5	0	5	2	15	−13	5		—	1–3	—	—	—	—

Source: ITTF
Rules for classification: 1) Points; 2) Head-to-head points; 3) Head-to-head matches; 4) Head-to-head sets

=== Knockout stage ===
The group winners of Groups G and H were drawn, as well as the second and third placed teams. Same for the fourth, fifth and sixth placed teams.

==== Places 37–48 ====
Round of 16
Argentina	3
Mexico	0
Cuba	3
Dominican Republic	0
Australia	0
Chile	3
Belgium	3
Colombia	0

Quarterfinals
Uzbekistan	3
Argentina	0
Cuba	3
England	2
Iran	2
Chile	3
Belgium	3
Greece	0

Semifinals
Uzbekistan	2
Cuba	3
Chile	0
Belgium	3

Final

==== Places 25–36 ====
Round of 16
France	3
Canada	2
Puerto Rico	3
Switzerland	2
Turkey	3
Croatia	1
Italy	3
Lithuania	0

Quarterfinals
Slovakia	1
France	3
Puerto Rico	2
Spain	3
Serbia	2
Turkey	3
Italy	3
Slovenia	2

Semifinals
France	1
Spain	3
Turkey	3
Italy	1

Final
Spain	3
Turkey	0

== Third division ==
=== Preliminary round ===
==== Group I ====
Pos	Team	Pld	W	L	MF	MA	MD	Pts	Qualification	Malaysia	Azerbaijan	Finland	Mongolia	Morocco	Pakistan
1	Malaysia	4	4	0	15	0	+15	8	Quarterfinals	—	—	—	3–0	3–0	—
2	Azerbaijan	4	3	1	9	3	+6	7	Round of 16	0–3	—	3–0	3–0	3–0	—
3	Finland	4	2	2	6	6	0	6	Round of 16	0–3	—	—	3–0	3–0	—
4	Mongolia	4	1	3	3	9	−6	5		—	—	—	—	3–0	—
5	Morocco	4	0	4	0	12	−12	4		—	—	—	—	—	—
6	Pakistan (Note: Pakistan withdrew as the team did not get a NOC from the Pakistan Sports Board (PSB).)	0	0	0	0	0	0	0	Withdrawn	—	—	—	—	—	—

Source: ITTF
Rules for classification: 1) Points; 2) Head-to-head points; 3) Head-to-head matches; 4) Head-to-head sets

==== Group J ====
Pos	Team	Pld	W	L	MF	MA	MD	Pts	Qualification	Indonesia	Kazakhstan	Guatemala	Jordan	Lebanon	South Africa
1	Indonesia	5	5	0	15	1	+14	10	Quarterfinals	—	3–1	—	3–0	3–0	3–0
2	Kazakhstan	5	4	1	13	5	+8	9	Round of 16	—	—	—	3–0	3–0	3–0
3	Guatemala	5	3	2	10	6	+4	8	Round of 16	0–3	1–3	—	3–0	3–0	3–0
4	Jordan	5	2	3	6	9	−3	7		—	—	—	—	—	3–0
5	Lebanon	5	1	4	3	13	−10	6		—	—	—	0–3	—	3–1
6	South Africa	5	0	5	1	15	−14	5		—	—	—	—	—	—

Source: ITTF
Rules for classification: 1) Points; 2) Head-to-head points; 3) Head-to-head matches; 4) Head-to-head sets

==== Group K ====
Pos	Team	Pld	W	L	MF	MA	MD	Pts	Qualification	Portugal	Estonia	Macau	Bulgaria	Turkmenistan	Algeria
1	Portugal	5	5	0	15	3	+12	10	Quarterfinals	—	—	—	—	—	—
2	Estonia	5	4	1	13	5	+8	9	Round of 16	1–3	—	3–0	3–2	3–0	3–0
3	Macau	5	3	2	9	8	+1	8	Round of 16	0–3	—	—	3–2	—	—
4	Bulgaria	5	2	3	11	10	+1	7		1–3	—	—	—	—	—
5	Turkmenistan	5	1	4	5	13	−8	6		1–3	—	0–3	1–3	—	—
6	Algeria	5	0	5	1	15	−14	5		0–3	—	0–3	0–3	1–3	—

Source: ITTF
Rules for classification: 1) Points; 2) Head-to-head points; 3) Head-to-head matches; 4) Head-to-head sets

==== Group L ====
Pos	Team	Pld	W	L	MF	MA	MD	Pts	Qualification	Wales	Bosnia and Herzegovina	Norway	Sri Lanka	Maldives	Bangladesh
1	Wales	4	4	0	12	2	+10	8	Quarterfinals	—	3–1	—	w/o	3–0	—
2	Bosnia and Herzegovina	4	3	1	10	4	+6	7	Round of 16	—	—	—	—	—	—
3	Norway	4	2	2	7	6	+1	6	Round of 16	1–3	0–3	—	3–0	3–0	—
4	Sri Lanka	4	1	3	4	9	−5	5		—	1–3	—	—	—	—
5	Maldives	4	0	4	0	12	−12	4		—	0–3	—	0–3	—	—
6	Bangladesh (Note: Bangladesh withdrew as the team did not get a visa from the Bangladesh Table Tennis Federation (BTTF).)	0	0	0	0	0	0	0	Withdrawn	—	—	—	—	—	—

Source: ITTF
Rules for classification: 1) Points; 2) Head-to-head points; 3) Head-to-head matches; 4) Head-to-head sets

=== Knockout stage ===
The group winners of Groups K and L were drawn, as well as the second and third placed teams. Same for the fourth, fifth and sixth placed teams.

==== Places 61–72 ====
Round of 16
Algeria	3
Maldives	1
Morocco	3
South Africa	2

Quarterfinals
Jordan	2
Algeria	3
Morocco	0
Sri Lanka	3
Bulgaria	3
Lebanon	1
Turkmenistan	0
Mongolia	3

Semifinals
Algeria	2
Sri Lanka	3
Bulgaria	3
Mongolia	0

Final

69th place bracket

Final
Maldives	0
South Africa	3

==== Places 49–60 ====
Round of 16
Norway	3
Kazakhstan	1
Azerbaijan	1
Macau	3
Guatemala	2
Bosnia and Herzegovina	3
Estonia	3
Finland	1

Quarterfinals
Malaysia	3
Norway	0
Macau	1
Wales	3
Portugal	2
Bosnia and Herzegovina	3
Estonia	0
Indonesia	3

Semifinals
Malaysia	3
Wales	0
Bosnia and Herzegovina	2
Indonesia	3

Final
Malaysia	0
Indonesia	3

57th place bracket

Semifinals
Kazakhstan	3
Azerbaijan	2
Guatemala	1
Finland	3

Final
