= 2022 European Table Tennis Championships – Women's singles =

Women's singles at the 2022 European Table Tennis Championships
- Venue: Rudi-Sedlmayer-Halle
- Location: Munich, Germany
- Dates: 14–21 August
- Competitors: 108 from 34 nations

Medalists
gold medal	Sofia Polcanova (AUT)
silver medal	Nina Mittelham (GER)
bronze medal	Sabine Winter (GER)
bronze medal	Shan Xiaona (GER)

The women's singles competition of the 2022 European Table Tennis Championships was held from 14 to 21 August 2022.

== Playing system ==
Draw of 64
32 seeded players
24 winners of the qualification groups
8 winners of the preliminary round 2 matches

== Group Play Stage ==
The winners of the groups will qualify to the Main Draw.
The runners-up from all the groups will play 2 preliminary rounds for the remaining 8 spots.

=== Group 1 ===
Pos	Team	W	L	SF	SA	SD	Pts		SOL (AUT)	PIN (POR)	TOK (BIH)
1	Amelie Solja (AUT)	2	0	6	0	+6	4	Qualification for Main Draw	—	3–0	3–0
2	Matilde Pinto (POR)	1	1	3	5	−2	3	Qualification for preliminary rounds	0–3	—	3–2
3	Sara Tokić (BIH)	0	2	2	6	−4	2		0–3	2–3	—

Source: Munich 2022

=== Group 2 ===
Pos	Team	W	L	SF	SA	SD	Pts		MOR (SUI)	SKÅ (NOR)	ERN (NED)
1	Rachel Moret (SUI)	2	0	6	2	+4	4	Qualification for Main Draw	—	3–0	3–2
2	Rikke Skåttet (NOR)	1	1	3	3	0	3	Qualification for preliminary rounds	0–3	—	3–0
3	Emine Ernst (NED)	0	2	2	6	−4	2		2–3	0–3	—

Source: Munich 2022

=== Group 3 ===
Pos	Team	W	L	SF	SA	SD	Pts		DRA (ROU)	VIG (SRB)	RIL (LTU)
1	Andreea Dragoman (ROU)	2	0	6	1	+5	4	Qualification for Main Draw	—	3–1	3–0
2	Dragana Vignjević (SRB)	1	1	4	4	0	3	Qualification for preliminary rounds	1–3	—	3–1
3	Kornelija Riliškytė (LTU)	0	2	1	6	−5	2		0–3	1–3	—

Source: Munich 2022

=== Group 4 ===
Pos	Team	W	L	SF	SA	SD	Pts		KAU (GER)	AVA (EST)	TER (GRE)
1	Annett Kaufmann (GER)	2	0	6	1	+5	4	Qualification for Main Draw	—	3–1	3–0
2	Airi Avameri (EST)	1	1	4	4	0	3	Qualification for preliminary rounds	1–3	—	3–1
3	Elisavet Terpou (GRE)	0	2	1	6	−5	2		0–3	1–3	—

Source: Munich 2022

=== Group 5 ===
Pos	Team	W	L	SF	SA	SD	Pts		ŠEV (CZE)	ŠUR (SRB)	MON (ITA)
1	Markéta Ševčíková (CZE)	2	0	6	1	+5	4	Qualification for Main Draw	—	3–1	3–0
2	Sabina Šurjan (SRB)	1	1	4	4	0	3	Qualification for preliminary rounds	1–3	—	3–1
3	Gaia Monfardini (ITA)	0	2	1	6	−5	2		0–3	1–3	—

Source: Munich 2022

=== Group 6 ===
Pos	Team	W	L	SF	SA	SD	Pts		BAR (ENG)	ARL (ITA)	HAN (EST)
1	Charlotte Bardsley (ENG)	2	0	6	2	+4	4	Qualification for Main Draw	—	3–2	3–0
2	Nicole Arlia (ITA)	1	1	5	4	+1	3	Qualification for preliminary rounds	2–3	—	3–1
3	Reelica Hanson (EST)	0	2	1	6	−5	2		0–3	1–3	—

Source: Munich 2022

=== Group 7 ===
Pos	Team	W	L	SF	SA	SD	Pts		HAR (HUN)	KIR (FIN)	BAR (LUX)
1	Leonie Hartbrich (HUN)	2	0	6	1	+5	4	Qualification for Main Draw	—	3–0	3–1
2	Anna Kirichenko (FIN)	1	1	3	3	0	3	Qualification for preliminary rounds	0–3	—	3–0
3	Ariel Barbosa (LUX)	0	2	1	6	−5	2		1–3	0–3	—

Source: Munich 2022

=== Group 8 ===
Pos	Team	W	L	SF	SA	SD	Pts		WĘG (POL)	JEG (CRO)	SAN (POR)
1	Katarzyna Węgrzyn (POL)	2	0	6	2	+4	4	Qualification for Main Draw	—	3–0	3–2
2	Mateja Jeger (CRO)	1	1	3	3	0	3	Qualification for preliminary rounds	0–3	—	3–0
3	Patrícia Santos (POR)	0	2	2	6	−4	2		2–3	0–3	—

Source: Munich 2022

=== Group 9 ===
Pos	Team	W	L	SF	SA	SD	Pts		MEN (NED)	DEG (BEL)	BET (FIN)
1	Shuohan Men (NED)	2	0	6	1	+5	4	Qualification for Main Draw	—	3–0	3–1
2	Margo Degraef (BEL)	1	1	3	3	0	3	Qualification for preliminary rounds	0–3	—	3–0
3	Ramona Betz (FIN)	0	2	1	6	−5	2		1–3	0–3	—

Source: Munich 2022

=== Group 10 ===
Pos	Team	W	L	SF	SA	SD	Pts		MAL (CRO)	KUL (TUR)	YOV (BUL)
1	Ivana Malobabić (CRO)	2	0	6	0	+6	4	Qualification for Main Draw	—	3–0	3–0
2	Simay Kulakçeken (TUR)	1	1	3	4	−1	3	Qualification for preliminary rounds	0–3	—	3–1
3	Maria Yovkova (BUL)	0	2	1	6	−5	2		0–3	1–3	—

Source: Munich 2022

=== Group 11 ===
Pos	Team	W	L	SF	SA	SD	Pts		HO (ENG)	WĘG (POL)	HOO (NED)
1	Tin-Tin Ho (ENG)	2	0	6	0	+6	4	Qualification for Main Draw	—	3–0	3–0
2	Anna Węgrzyn (POL)	1	1	3	3	0	3	Qualification for preliminary rounds	0–3	—	3–0
3	Sanne de Hoop (NED)	0	2	0	6	−6	2		0–3	0–3	—

Source: Munich 2022

=== Group 12 ===
Pos	Team	W	L	SF	SA	SD	Pts		GON (LUX)	TOF (NOR)	VIV (ITA)
1	Tessy Gonderinger (LUX)	1	1	4	4	0	3	Qualification for Main Draw	—	1–3	3–1
2	Martine Toftaker (NOR)	1	1	4	4	0	3	Qualification for preliminary rounds	3–1	—	1–3
3	Debora Vivarelli (ITA)	1	1	4	4	0	3		1–3	3–1	—

Source: Munich 2022

=== Group 13 ===
Pos	Team	W	L	SF	SA	SD	Pts		ARA (CRO)	PLĂ (ROU)	PAR (GRE)
1	Hana Arapović (CRO)	2	0	6	4	+2	4	Qualification for Main Draw	—	3–2	3–2
2	Tania Plăian (ROU)	1	1	5	4	+1	3	Qualification for preliminary rounds	2–3	—	3–1
3	Konstantina Paridi (GRE)	0	2	3	6	−3	2		2–3	1–3	—

Source: Munich 2022

=== Group 14 ===
Pos	Team	W	L	SF	SA	SD	Pts		GUI (FRA)	ZHA (ESP)	RIL (LTU)
1	Océane Guisnel (FRA)	2	0	6	2	+4	4	Qualification for Main Draw	—	3–1	3–1
2	Sofia Xuan Zhang (ESP)	1	1	4	3	+1	3	Qualification for preliminary rounds	1–3	—	3–0
3	Emilija Riliškytė (LTU)	0	2	1	6	−5	2		1–3	0–3	—

Source: Munich 2022

=== Group 15 ===
Pos	Team	W	L	SF	SA	SD	Pts		CAR (NOR)	LAB (SVK)	MUS (SWE)
1	Rebekka Carlsen (NOR)	2	0	6	2	+4	4	Qualification for Main Draw	—	3–1	3–1
2	Ema Labošová (SVK)	1	1	4	4	0	3	Qualification for preliminary rounds	1–3	—	3–1
3	Rebecca Muskantor (SWE)	0	2	2	6	−4	2		1–3	1–3	—

Source: Munich 2022

=== Group 16 ===
Pos	Team	W	L	SF	SA	SD	Pts		BIL (UKR)	LUT (FRA)	JAN (LTU)
1	Tetiana Bilenko (UKR)	2	0	6	2	+4	4	Qualification for Main Draw	—	3–2	3–0
2	Charlotte Lutz (FRA)	1	1	5	5	0	3	Qualification for preliminary rounds	2–3	—	3–2
3	Eglė Jankauskienė (LTU)	0	2	2	6	−4	2		0–3	2–3	—

Source: Munich 2022

=== Group 17 ===
Pos	Team	W	L	SF	SA	SD	Pts		TRI (BUL)	STR (SLO)	MUS (LAT)
1	Polina Trifonova (BUL)	2	0	6	1	+5	4	Qualification for Main Draw	—	3–1	3–0
2	Katarina Stražar (SLO)	1	1	4	3	+1	3	Qualification for preliminary rounds	1–3	—	3–0
3	Sabina Musajeva (LAT)	0	2	0	6	−6	2		0–3	0–3	—

Source: Munich 2022

=== Group 18 ===
Pos	Team	W	L	SF	SA	SD	Pts		MIS (AUT)	BLA (CZE)	ROD (ESP)
1	Karoline Mischek (AUT)	2	0	6	4	+2	4	Qualification for Main Draw	—	3–2	3–2
2	Zdena Blašková (CZE)	1	1	5	4	+1	3	Qualification for preliminary rounds	2–3	—	3–1
3	Ángela Rodríguez (ESP)	0	2	3	6	−3	2		2–3	1–3	—

Source: Munich 2022

=== Group 19 ===
Pos	Team	W	L	SF	SA	SD	Pts		BRA (UKR)	MAT (POR)	HRI (BUL)
1	Solomiya Brateyko (UKR)	2	0	6	2	+4	4	Qualification for Main Draw	—	3–2	3–0
2	Inês Matos (POR)	1	1	5	4	+1	3	Qualification for preliminary rounds	2–3	—	3–1
3	Kalina Hristova (BUL)	0	2	1	6	−5	2		0–3	1–3	—

Source: Munich 2022

=== Group 20 ===
Pos	Team	W	L	SF	SA	SD	Pts		TOF (SLO)	PUC (SVK)	MEL (CYP)
1	Ana Tofant (SLO)	2	0	6	2	+4	4	Qualification for Main Draw	—	3–2	3–0
2	Nikoleta Puchovanová (SVK)	1	1	5	3	+2	3	Qualification for preliminary rounds	2–3	—	3–0
3	Foteini Meletie (CYP)	0	2	0	6	−6	2		0–3	0–3	—

Source: Munich 2022

=== Group 21 ===
Pos	Team	W	L	SF	SA	SD	Pts		CIO (ROU)	BÁL (HUN)	BOG (LAT)	UCE (MKD)
1	Irina Ciobanu (ROU)	3	0	9	0	+9	6	Qualification for Main Draw	—	3–0	3–0	3–0
2	Bernadett Bálint (HUN)	2	1	6	3	+3	5	Qualification for preliminary rounds	0–3	—	3–0	3–0
3	Baiba Bogdanova (LAT)	1	2	3	7	−4	4		0–3	0–3	—	3–1
4	Amelija Uce-Nikolov (MKD)	0	3	1	9	−8	3		0–3	0–3	1–3	—

Source: Munich 2022

=== Group 22 ===
Pos	Team	W	L	SF	SA	SD	Pts		PAR (POL)	TOL (GRE)	BIO (BIH)	MUN (ESP)
1	Natalia Partyka (POL)	3	0	9	0	+9	6	Qualification for Main Draw	—	3–0	3–0	3–0
2	Katerina Toliou (GRE)	2	1	6	3	+3	5	Qualification for preliminary rounds	0–3	—	3–0	3–0
3	Džana Biogradlić (BIH)	1	2	3	8	−5	4		0–3	0–3	—	3–2
4	Mariona Munné (ESP)	0	3	2	9	−7	3		0–3	0–3	2–3	—

Source: Munich 2022

=== Group 23 ===
Pos	Team	W	L	SF	SA	SD	Pts		SCH (GER)	YIL (TUR)	CHI (MDA)	GNJ (BIH)
1	Franziska Schreiner (GER)	3	0	9	0	+9	6	Qualification for Main Draw	—	3–0	3–0	3–0
2	Özge Yılmaz (TUR)	2	1	6	3	+3	5	Qualification for preliminary rounds	0–3	—	3–0	3–0
3	Alexandra Chiriacova (MDA)	1	2	3	7	−4	4		0–3	0–3	—	3–1
4	Marija Gnjatić (BIH)	0	3	1	9	−8	3		0–3	0–3	1–3	—

Source: Munich 2022

=== Group 24 ===
Pos	Team	W	L	SF	SA	SD	Pts		TOM (CZE)	BER (SWE)	MEŠ (BIH)	ZEQ (KOS)
1	Kateřina Tomanovská (CZE)	3	0	9	2	+7	6	Qualification for Main Draw	—	3–2	3–0	W/O
2	Filippa Bergand (SWE)	2	1	8	3	+5	5	Qualification for preliminary rounds	2–3	—	3–0	3–0
3	Harisa Mešetović (BIH)	1	2	3	8	−5	4		0–3	0–3	—	3–2
4	Linda Zeqiri (KOS)	0	3	2	9	−7	3		W/O	0–3	2–3	—

Source: Munich 2022

== Preliminary round ==
The winners of the preliminary round 2 matches will qualify for the Main draw.

Preliminary round 1		Preliminary round 2
		F Bergand (SWE)	1
M Jeger (CRO)	3	M Jeger (CRO)	3
M Degraef (BEL)	2
		Ö Yılmaz (TUR)	3
A Kirichenko (FIN)	1	A Węgrzyn (POL)	1
A Węgrzyn (POL)	3
		K Toliou (GRE)	3
N Arlia (ITA)	3	N Arlia (ITA)	0
S Kulakçeken (TUR)	2
		B Bálint (HUN)	2
S Šurjan (SRB)	3	S Šurjan (SRB)	3
M Toftaker (NOR)	0
		N Puchovanová (SVK)	0
A Avameri (EST)	1	T Plăian (ROU)	3
T Plăian (ROU)	3
		I Matos (POR)	1
D Vignjević (SRB)	3	D Vignjević (SRB)	3
SX Zhang (ESP)	0
		Z Blašková (CZE)	3
R Skåttet (NOR)	3	R Skåttet (NOR)	1
E Labošová (SVK)	2
		K Stražar (SLO)	1
M Pinto (POR)	1	C Lutz (FRA)	3
C Lutz (FRA)	3

== Main Draw ==
Results

=== Section 1 ===
Round of 64
1	Y Han (GER)	4
D Vignjević (SRB)	0
M Ševčíková (CZE)	0
17	C Källberg (SWE)	4
28	I Lupulesku (SRB)	3
I Ciobanu (ROU)	4
O Guisnel (FRA)	0
14	S Winter (GER)	4
16	B Eerland (NED)
T Bilenko (UKR)	W/O
A Solja (AUT)	3
30	T Kukuľková (SVK)	4
23	G Piccolin (ITA)	4
T Gonderinger (LUX)	1
M Jeger (CRO)	2
5	H Matelová (CZE)	4

Round of 32
1	Y Han (GER)	4
17	C Källberg (SWE)	0
I Ciobanu (ROU)	3
14	S Winter (GER)	4
T Bilenko (UKR)	1
30	T Kukuľková (SVK)	4
23	G Piccolin (ITA)	4
5	H Matelová (CZE)	2

Round of 16
1	Y Han (GER)	0
14	S Winter (GER)	4
30	T Kukuľková (SVK)	1
23	G Piccolin (ITA)	4

Quarterfinals
14	S Winter (GER)	4
23	G Piccolin (ITA)	0

=== Section 2 ===
Round of 64
8	B Szőcs (ROU)	4
Z Blašková (CZE)	0
R Moret (SUI)	3
18	G Póta (HUN)	4
31	P Pavade (FRA)	4
I Malobabić (CRO)	1
P Trifonova (BUL)	1
11	XL Ni (LUX)	4
12	B Balážová (SVK)	3
N Partyka (POL)	4
H Arapović (CRO)	4
28	C Lutz (FRA)	3
19	S De Nutte (LUX)	3
TT Ho (ENG)	4
Ö Yılmaz (TUR)	0
3	S Polcanova (AUT)	4

Round of 32
8	B Szőcs (ROU)	4
18	G Póta (HUN)	0
31	P Pavade (FRA)	3
11	XL Ni (LUX)	4
N Partyka (POL)	4
H Arapović (CRO)	3
TT Ho (ENG)	1
3	S Polcanova (AUT)	4

Round of 16
8	B Szőcs (ROU)	4
11	XL Ni (LUX)	3
N Partyka (POL)	2
3	S Polcanova (AUT)	4

Quarterfinals
8	B Szőcs (ROU)	2
3	S Polcanova (AUT)	4

=== Section 3 ===
Round of 64
4	X Shan (GER)	4
T Plăian (ROU)	0
K Węgrzyn (POL)	4
26	A Diaconu (ROU)	2
20	D Madarász (HUN)	4
S Brateyko (UKR)	1
S Men (NED)	0
9	E Samara (ROU)	4
15	J Shao (POR)	4
C Bardsley (ENG)	0
L Hartbrich (HUN)	1
24	G Gaponova (UKR)	4
25	S Altinkaya (TUR)	1
K Mischek (AUT)	4
S Šurjan (SRB)	4
7	F Yu (POR)	2

Round of 32
4	X Shan (GER)	4
K Węgrzyn (POL)	0
20	D Madarász (HUN)	3
9	E Samara (ROU)	4
15	J Shao (POR)	4
24	G Gaponova (UKR)	1
K Mischek (AUT)	0
S Šurjan (SRB)	4

Round of 16
4	X Shan (GER)	4
9	E Samara (ROU)	0
15	J Shao (POR)	4
S Šurjan (SRB)	2

Quarterfinals
4	X Shan (GER)	4
15	J Shao (POR)	3

=== Section 4 ===
Round of 64
6	J Yuan (FRA)	4
K Toliou (GRE)	3
A Kaufmann (GER)	3
22	N Bajor (POL)	4
21	M Xiao (ESP)	4
F Schreiner (GER)	3
A Tofant (SLO)	3
10	M Pesotska (UKR)	4
13	L Bergström (SWE)	4
R Carlsen (NOR)	0
A Dragoman (ROU)	4
32	A Todorović (SRB)	1
27	Y Wan (GER)	4
K Tomanovská (CZE)	2
Ch Lutz (FRA)	1
2	N Mittelham (GER)	4

Round of 32
6	J Yuan (FRA)	4
22	N Bajor (POL)	1
21	M Xiao (ESP)	2
10	M Pesotska (UKR)	4
13	L Bergström (SWE)	1
A Dragoman (ROU)	4
27	Y Wan (GER)	1
2	N Mittelham (GER)	4

Round of 16
6	J Yuan (FRA)	4
10	M Pesotska (UKR)	3
A Dragoman (ROU)	2
2	N Mittelham (GER)	4

Quarterfinals
6	J Yuan (FRA)	3
2	N Mittelham (GER)	4

=== Finals ===
Quarterfinals			Semifinals			Final
14	S Winter (GER)	4
23	G Piccolin (ITA)	0	14	S Winter (GER)	3
8	B Szőcs (ROU)	2	3	S Polcanova (AUT)	4
3	S Polcanova (AUT)	4				3	S Polcanova (AUT)	4
4	X Shan (GER)	4				2	N Mittelham (GER)	0
15	J Shao (POR)	3	4	X Shan (GER)	1
6	J Yuan (FRA)	3	2	N Mittelham (GER)	4
2	N Mittelham (GER)	4

== Participating nations ==
108 players from 34 nations.

- Austria (3)
- Belgium (1)
- Bosnia and Herzegovina (3)
- Bulgaria (3)
- Croatia (3)
- Cyprus (1)
- Czech Republic (4)
- England (2)
- Estonia (2)
- Finland (2)
- France (5)
- Germany (7)
- Greece (3)
- Hungary (4)
- Italy (4)
- Kosovo (1)
- Latvia (2)
- Lithuania (3)
- Luxembourg (4)
- Moldova (1)
- Netherlands (4)
- North Macedonia (1)
- Norway (3)
- Poland (4)
- Portugal (5)
- Romania (6)
- Slovakia (4)
- Slovenia (3)
- Serbia (4)
- Spain (4)
- Sweden (4)
- Switzerland (1)
- Turkey (3)
- Ukraine (4)
