= 2012 European Table Tennis Championships =

- Date: 15 – 21 Oct
- Location: Herning, Denmark
- Venue: Jyske Bank Boxen
- European Table Tennis Championships

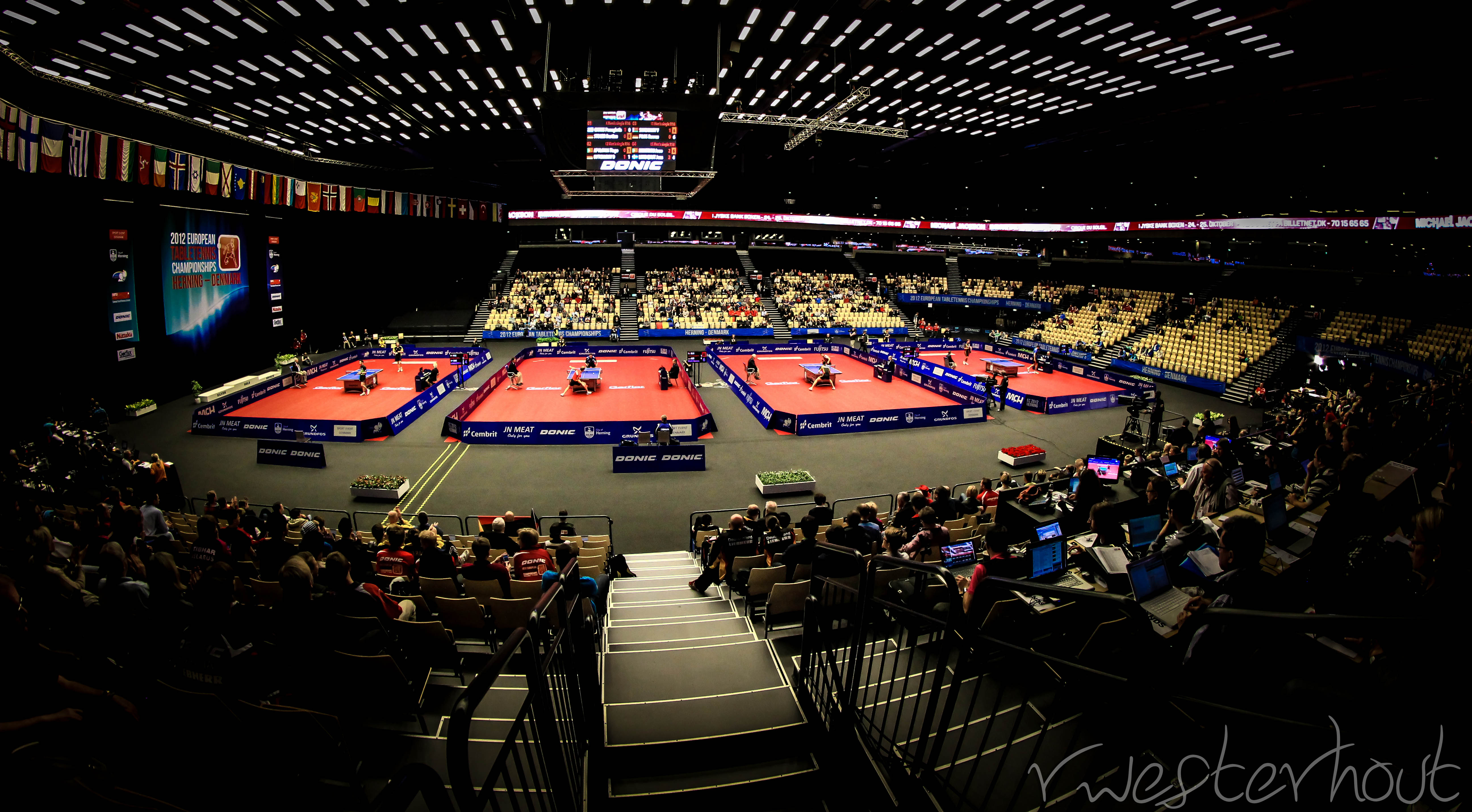
2012 European Table Tennis Championships

The 2012 European Table Tennis Championships was held in Herning, Denmark from 15–21 October 2012. The venue for the competition was Jyske Bank Boxen.

== Medal summary ==
=== Men's events ===
Event	Gold	Silver	Bronze
Team	Not held	Not held	Not held
Singles	Timo Boll (GER)	Tan Ruiwu (CRO)	Adrian Crișan (ROU) Bastian Steger (GER)
Doubles	Robert Gardos (AUT); Daniel Habesohn (AUT)	Kristian Karlsson (SWE); Mattias Karlsson (SWE)	Alexey Liventsov (RUS); Mikhail Paykov (RUS) Dimitrij Ovtcharov (GER); Vladimir Samsonov (BLR)

=== Women's events ===
Event	Gold	Silver	Bronze
Team	Not held	Not held	Not held
Singles	Viktoria Pavlovich (BLR)	Xian Yi Fang (FRA)	Liu Jia (AUT) Li Xue (FRA)
Doubles	Daniela Dodean (ROU); Elizabeta Samara (ROU)	Georgina Póta (HUN); Krisztina Tóth (HUN)	Wu Jiaduo (GER); Kristin Silbereisen (GER) Dóra Csilla Madarász (HUN); Britt Eerland (NED)
