= Halmstad BTK =

Table tennis club in Halmstad, Sweden

- Full name: Halmstad bordtennisklubb
- Sport: table tennis
- Founded: 27 October 1937
- Based in: Halmstad, Sweden
- Arena: Halmstad Arena
- Head coach: Ulf "Tickan" Carlsson

Halmstad BTK is a table tennis club in Halmstad, Sweden. Established on 27 October 1937, the club won the Swedish national men's team championship in 1993 and 2003 and the Swedish women's national team championship in 1991, 1992, 1995 and 1996. Jörgen Persson and Åsa Svensson have played for the club.
