= Chicago Wind (table tennis) =

American table tennis team

- Sport: Table tennis
- Founded: 2023
- League: Major League Table Tennis (MLTT)
- Division: West Division
- Based in: Chicago, Illinois
- Arena: Compass Arena (Willowbrook, IL); Energy VBC (Bensenville, IL)
- Colors: Navy blue, sky blue, and white
- Owner: James Bowman
- Head coach: Eric Owens
- Captain: Robert Gardos
- Website: www.mltt.com/mltt-team/chicago-wind

The Chicago Wind are a professional table tennis franchise competing in Major League Table Tennis (MLTT), the first professional table tennis league in the United States. Based in the Chicago metropolitan area, the Wind are one of the league's founding franchises. After a challenging inaugural season in 2023–24, the Wind improved dramatically in Season 2, finishing second in the East Division and qualifying for the postseason playoffs for the first time.

== History ==
=== Founding and season 1 (2023–24) ===
The Chicago Wind was established in 2023 as one of the original eight franchises of Major League Table Tennis (MLTT). The league was founded by entrepreneur Flint Lane, with the inaugural season beginning in Daytona Beach on September 15, 2023, following the league's national debut on ESPN’s "The Ocho" on September 8, 2023.

Ownership of the Wind was awarded to James Bowman, a long-time entrepreneur and co-founder and Chairman of the Board of Velosio. Chicago was initially placed in the East Division for Season 1, where they finished with an 8–14 record and 207 points, placing fourth and missing the playoffs.

=== Season 2 (2024–25) ===
Season 2 represented a major turnaround for the franchise. The Wind posted an 11–7 record and accumulated 203 points, finishing second in the East Division. The season was highlighted by the performance of Mo Zhang, who was named the Season 2 Female MVP.

In the 2024–25 playoffs, the Wind fell to the Carolina Gold Rush and the Texas Smash, ultimately finishing fourth overall in the postseason.

=== Season 3 (2025–26) ===
For Season 3, the Wind were realigned to the West Division as part of the league's expansion to 10 teams. The team retained core players like Robert Gardos and Emmanuel Lebesson, the latter of whom has continued as a top-five power-rated player in the league.

== Team identity ==
The Chicago Wind’s name pays homage to Chicago’s "Windy City" moniker.

== Season records ==
record

Chicago Wind Season Records
Season	W–L	Points	Division Finish	Playoffs
2023–24 (Season 1)	8–14	207	4th, East	Did not qualify
2024–25 (Season 2)	11–7	203	2nd, East	4th Place
2025–26 (Season 3)	13–5	227	1st, West	3rd Place

== Roster ==
The Chicago Wind roster features an internationally diverse group of professional table tennis players. MLTT rosters include both male and female competitors who play singles, doubles, and the signature Golden Game format.

Chicago Wind Roster
Player	Nationality	Notes
Robert Gardos	Austria	Two-time Olympian; #3 overall power rating in Season 2
Emmanuel Lebesson	France	European Champion; #5 overall power rating in Season 2
Alex Cazacu	Romania	International professional; doubles specialist
Jeongwoo Park	South Korea	2016 ITTF World Tour Czech Open winner
Sean Zhang	United States	American-based competitor
Daniel Tran	United States	American-based competitor; "Doubles dynamo"
Mo Zhang	Canada	Season 2 Female MVP; multi-time Olympian

== Ownership and staff ==
=== Owner: James Bowman ===
James Bowman is an entrepreneur and co-founder and Chairman of the Board of Velosio, a leading Microsoft technology solutions provider. He also serves as Advisory Board Chair for Think Big for Kids. Bowman was among the original franchise owners announced at MLTT's launch in September 2023.

=== Head Coach: Eric Owens ===
Eric Owens is a U.S. Table Tennis Hall of Famer and former U.S. National Champion. In addition to coaching the Wind, Owens co-founded Delos Therapy and serves as a color analyst for MLTT broadcasts.

== Home venues ==
The Chicago Wind play home events at multiple venues in the greater Chicago area:

- Compass Arena — Willowbrook, Illinois. Hosted MLTT Week 10 in January 2026.
- Energy VBC — Bensenville, Illinois. Hosted Season 3 home matches including MLTT Week 4 in October 2025.
