= Hannah Holgersson =

Swedish operatic soprano (born 1976)

Hannah Holgersson (born 1976) is a Swedish operatic soprano.

She was born in Höör, Skåne County, Sweden. In 2003, Holgersson made her opera début as Zerlina in Mozart’s Don Giovanni. In May 2004, she graduated from the Royal College of Music, Stockholm, receiving diplomas in voice performance and pedagogy. Her main professor during her years at the RCM was Christina Öqvist-Matton.

As a soloist, she has performed with orchestras including the Royal Philharmonic Orchestra, the Royal Opera Orchestra of Stockholm, the Drottningholm Baroque Orchestra and Kroumata (percussion-ensemble), with the Eric Ericson Chamber Choir, and with conductors such as Alan Gilbert, Siegfried Köhler and Laurence Reenes. She has also collaborated with the composers Ingvar Lidholm, Steve Dobrogosz and Kjell Perder.

Holgersson often produces her own concerts, both in Sweden and abroad. She is also a soloist on several CD-recordings. In addition to her career as a soloist, she also teaches singing. She also performed on Therion's 2007 album Gothic Kabbalah, but not on the band's tour promoting the album.

== Sources ==
- Bain, Sara, Scottish Chamber Orchestra returns to DG One, Dumfries Standard, 11 December 2009
- Kvällsposten, Sångerskan Hannah från Höör gör succé, 8 February 2010
- Kosman, Joshua, Ligeti's comic-book Requiem, San Francisco Chronicle, 7 March 2009
- Sveriges Radio, Hannah fick Östgöta Gilles stipendium, 3 December 2008
