= Robert Gardos =

Austrian table tennis player

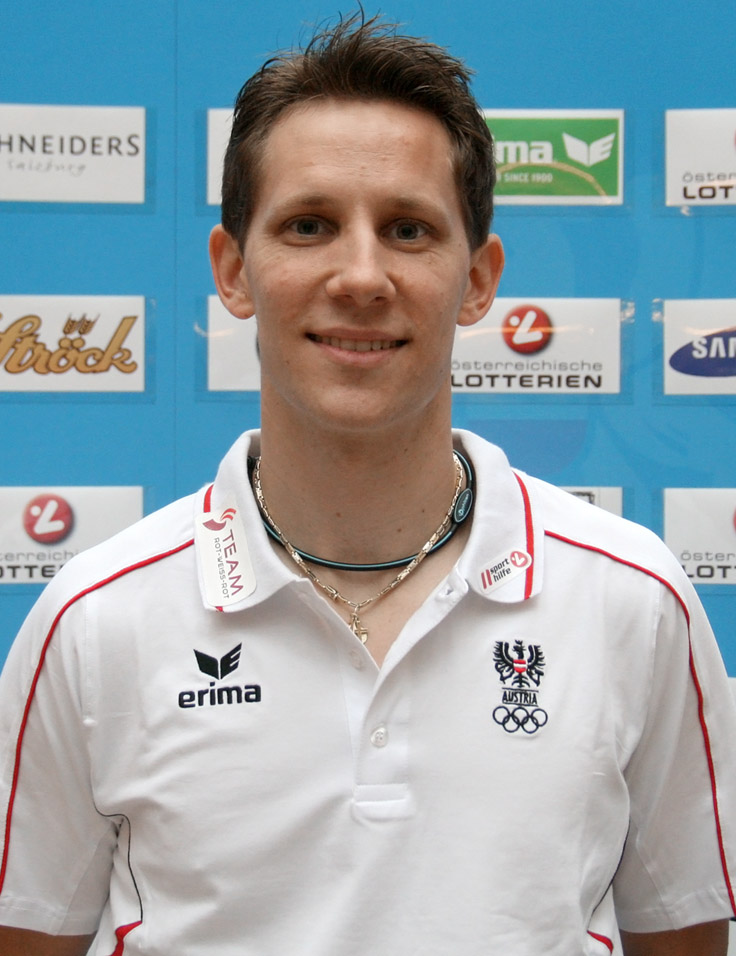
- Gardos at the 2012 Summer Olympics

Personal information
- Full name: Robert Gardos
- Nickname: Robi
- Nationality: Austrian
- Born: 16 January 1979 (age 47) Budapest, Hungary
- Height: 1.78 m (5 ft 10 in)
- Weight: 66 kg (146 lb)

Sport
- Sport: Table tennis
- Club: Chartres ASTT
- Playing style: Backhand orientation, fast, offensive, topspin
- Equipment: Blade: Butterfly Timo Boll ALC ST; Forehand Rubber: Butterfly Tenergy 05; Backhand Rubber: Butterfly Tenergy 05
- Highest ranking: 18 (March 2015)
- Current ranking: 177 (21 September 2026)
Medal record
Men's table tennis
Representing Austria
European Games
| Bronze medal – third place | 2015 Baku | Team |
European Championships
| Gold medal – first place | 2012 Herning | Doubles |
| Gold medal – first place | 2015 Yekaterinburg | Team |
| Silver medal – second place | 2013 Schwechat | Doubles |
| Silver medal – second place | 2022 Munich | Doubles |
| Silver medal – second place | 2024 Linz | Mixed doubles |
| Bronze medal – third place | 2008 St. Petersburg | Singles |
| Bronze medal – third place | 2008 St. Petersburg | Doubles |
| Bronze medal – third place | 2009 Stuttgart | Team |
| Bronze medal – third place | 2011 Gdańsk–Sopot | Team |
| Bronze medal – third place | 2022 Munich | Mixed doubles |
Representing Hungary
European Youth Championships
| Gold medal – first place | 1993 Ljubljana | Singles |
| Gold medal – first place | 1993 Ljubljana | Mixed Doubles |

Robert Gardos (Hungarian: Gárdos Róbert, Hungarian pronunciation: [ˈɡaːrdoʃ ˈroːbɛrt]; born 16 January 1979 in Budapest) is a Hungarian-born Austrian table tennis player, European Champion and Olympic participant. He plays for the French club Chartres ASTT.

Since the opening in 2011, Robert Gardos practices at the Werner Schlager Academy in Schwechat, Austria.

== Career ==
=== Early career ===
Gardos was born on 16 January 1979 in Budapest, Hungary. He began playing table tennis in his hometown club Budapesti VSC where his father, Gábor Gárdos worked as a coach. In 1993 Gardos won the European Youth Championship in singles and in mixed doubles on the side of Mihaela Encea in the cadet category. At the age of 14, he switched his residence to Austria, however, he competed for Hungary until he was 18. In 1998, after a conflict with the Hungarian national team – Gardos was left out from the team and could only compete in the singles event – he opted to play for Austria in the future, having already obtained Austrian citizenship two years earlier.

=== Austrian years ===
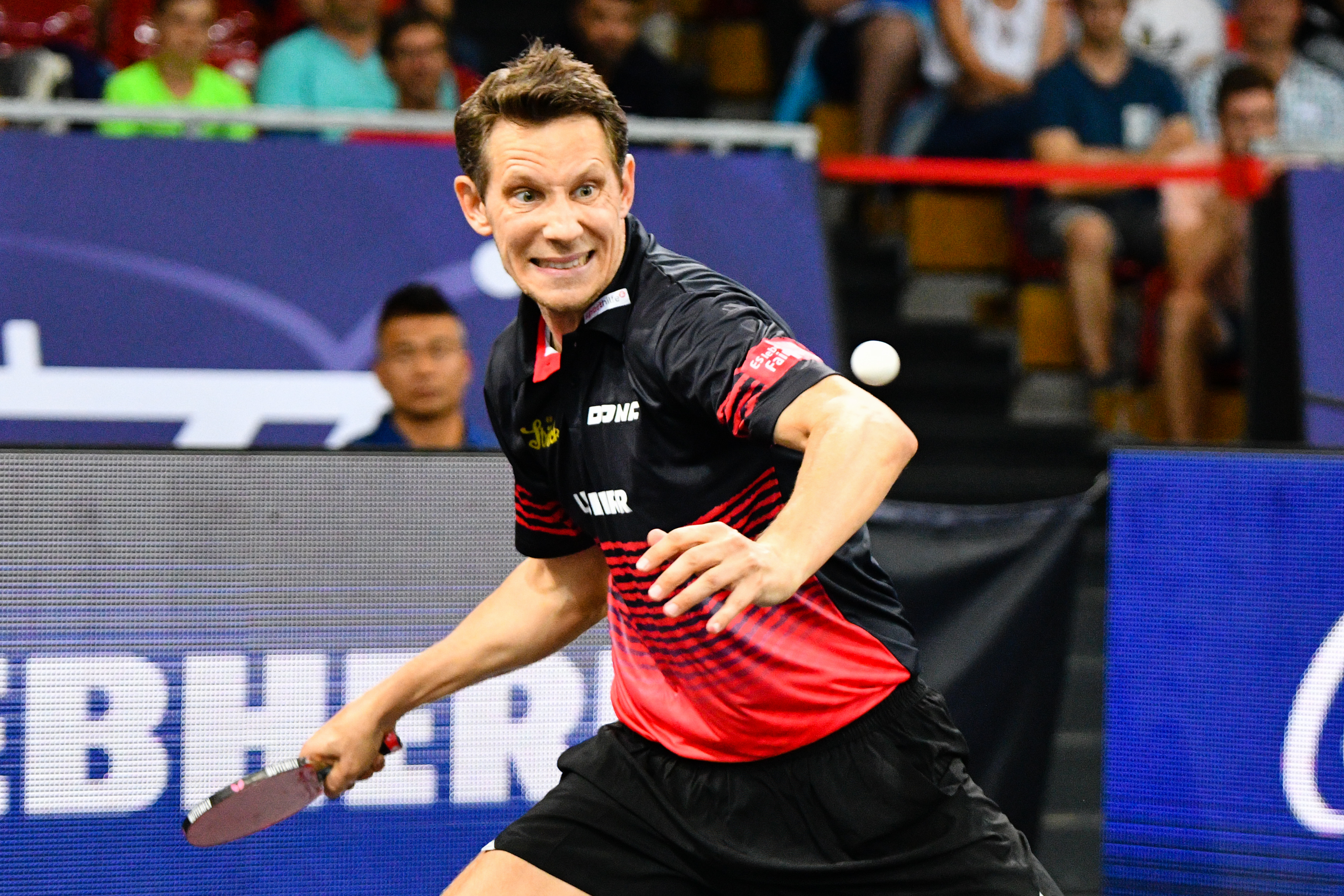
European Championships 2022, Munich

Gardos, who is right-handed, began competing for Austria after the three year international suspension for country changing was lifted. He had several success at Table Tennis European Championships, most notably winning the doubles event of the 2012 edition with Daniel Habesohn. One year later the duo finished second in the same event having lost the final against Wang Zeng Yi and Tan Ruiwu. In singles, Gardos' best performance came in 2008 in St. Petersburg by finishing third.

Gardos was also present at two Olympic Games in 2008 and 2012. At the 2008 Summer Olympics Gardos faced an early exit in the singles as he was beaten in the second round by Zoran Primorac, thus finished tied-33rd. In the team event, Austria (Robert Gardos, Chen Weixing, Werner Schlager) just missed out a medal as they fell short against South Korea (Oh Sang-Eun, Ryu Seung-Min, Yoon Jae-Young) in the bronze final by a scoreline 1–3.

Gardos did not qualify for the 2012 Summer Olympics in singles, but the Austrian team with the same line-up was present at the Games. After an easy victory in the first round (Egypt, 3–0), the team faced eventual bronze medalist Germany and lost without winning a single match (0–3), thus finishing tied-fifth.

In June 2015, he competed in the inaugural European Games, for Austria in table tennis, more specifically, Men's team with Stefan Fegerl and Daniel Habesohn. He earned a bronze medal.

Gardos qualified for and competed in the 2017 World Table Tennis Championships, seeded at number 42. In the first round, he defeated Chew Zhe Yu of Singapore (4–2), before losing to Chinese player, and number 4 seed Zhang Jike, (2–4).

=== Major League Table Tennis ===
In his debut season, Gardos joined the Major League Table Tennis (MLTT) league in the United States, competing for the Chicago Wind. The American professional league features top international players, and Gardos was highlighted as a key signing given his experience as a two-time Olympian and former world number 18. Gardos was named season three's Most Valuable Player.

== Personal life ==
His nickname is Robi. His hobbies include playing golf, reading, and listening to music. He speaks German, Hungarian, Spanish, and English.

== Style ==
Robert Gardos uses the following styles for play:

- Offensive
- Fast
- Topspin
- Backhand orientation
