= Halmstad Arena =

Multi purpose area in Halmstad, Sweden

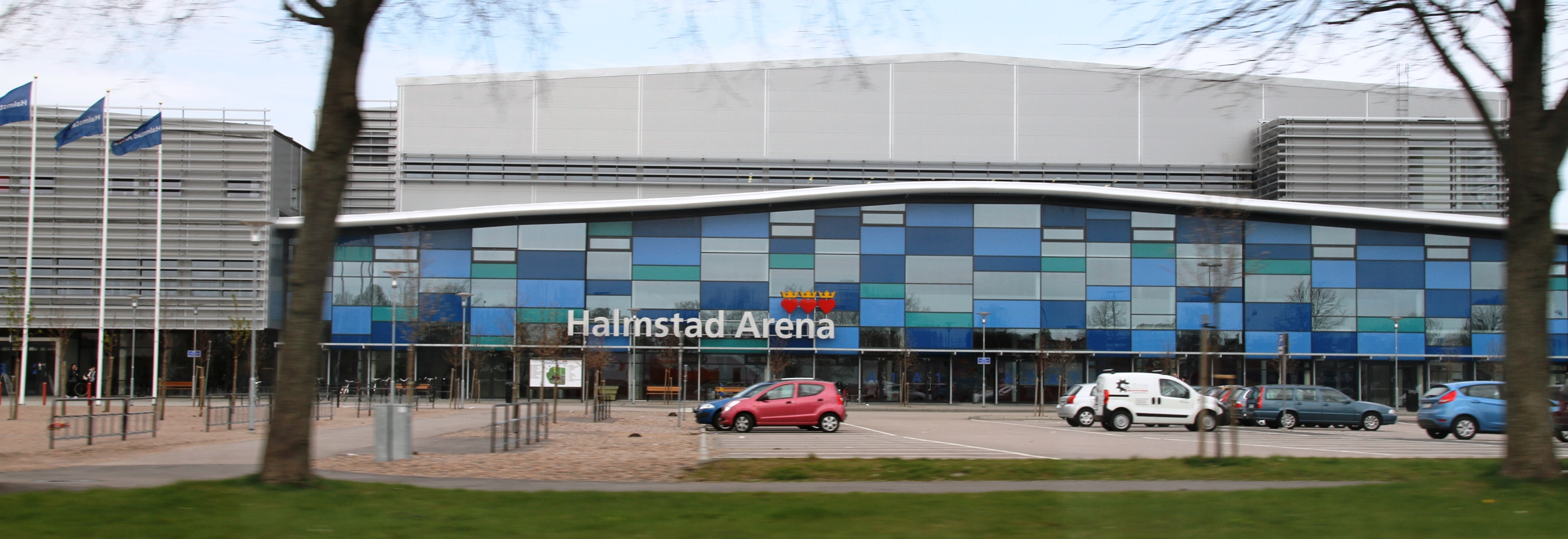
- Halmstad Arena in April 2012
- Interactive map of Halmstad Arena
- Former names: Sannarpshallen
- Location: Halmstad, Sweden
- Coordinates: 56.674601°N 12.889405°E
- Owner: Halmstad Municipality
- Operator: Halmstad Municipality
- Capacity: 4,000; 4,500 (concerts)

Construction
- Groundbreaking: 15 November 2007
- Opened: 20 February 2010
- Cost: 360 million SEK; 39 million EURO
- Architect: Tengbomgruppen

Tenant
- Various

Halmstad Arena is a multi purpose area in Halmstad, Sweden. Halmstad Arena is used for sport activities, concerts, meetings and fairs.

Construction began on 15 November 2007 and the arena was officially opened on 20 February 2010.

== Halmstad Arena ==
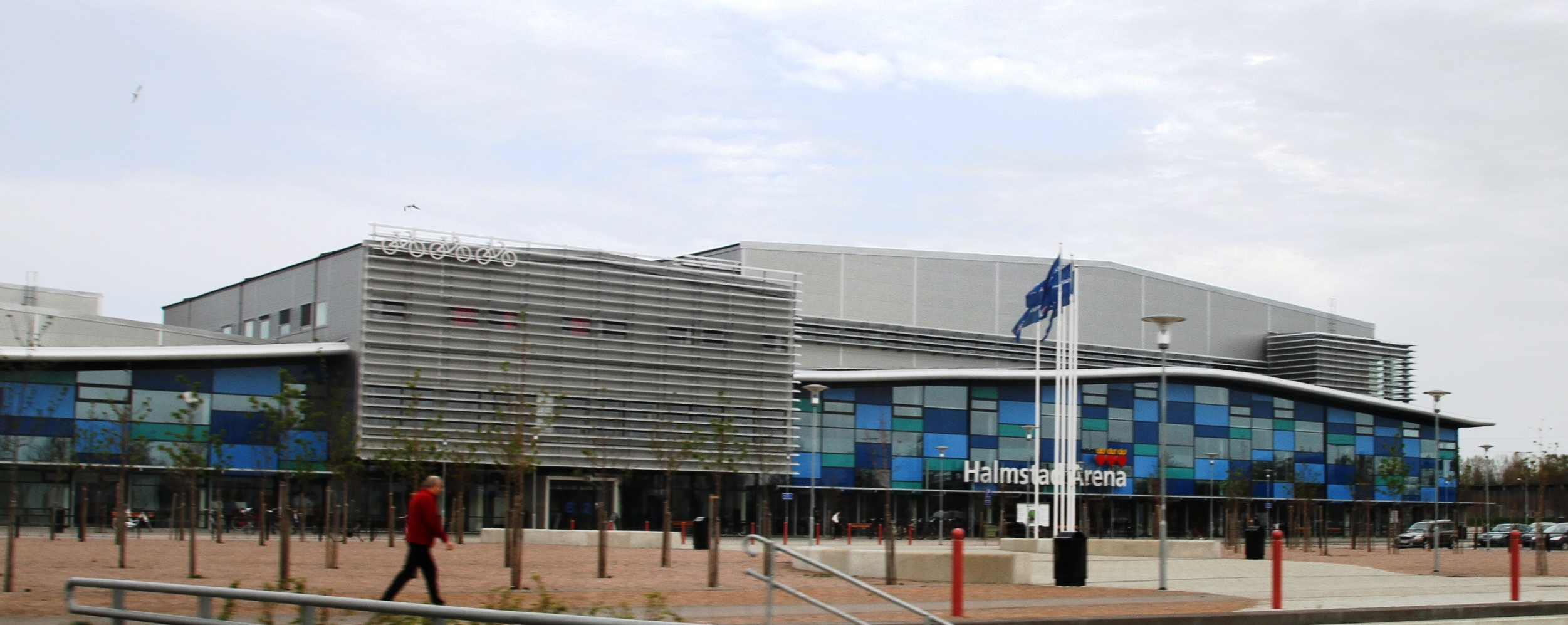
Halmstad Arena (April 2012)

=== The main arena building ===
The main building at Halmstad Arena includes four full size sport halls, five smaller special halls, two full size ice rinks and one smaller rink and a waterpark/indoor swimming pool.

=== Other facilities ===
The area also includes a skatepark, twelve full size soccer fields, two full size soccer fields with artificial playing surface, five smaller soccer fields and an outdoor facility for track & field and soccer practice.

== Tenants ==
- Halmstad BTK
- Halmstad Hammers Hockey
- Sannarps Hockey Club
- Halmstads Konståkningsklubb
- Simklubben Laxen
- Simföreningen Aquariet
- HK Drott
- Halmstads Handbollspojkar
- Halmstads Fäktsällskap
- HAIS
- Brottarklubben Allians
- Halmstads Rytmiska GF
- Halmstad Bordtennisklubb
- Halmstad Innebandyklubb
- GF Nissaflickorna
- Shotokan
- Halmstads Bordtennisallians
- Halmstad Basket

== See also ==
- List of indoor arenas in Sweden
- List of indoor arenas in Nordic countries
