= Daniel Habesohn =

Austrian table tennis player (born 1986)

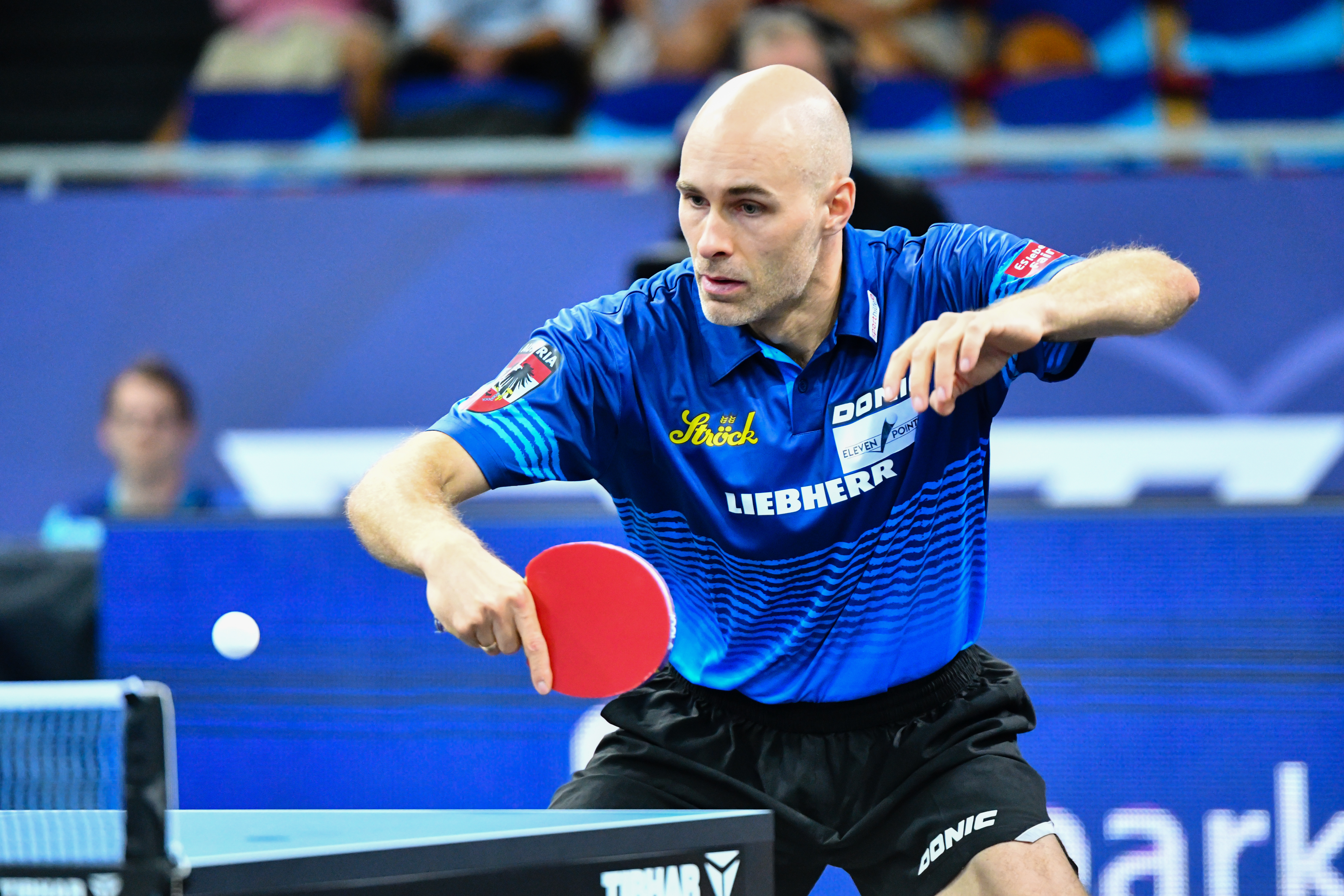
- Habesohn at the 2022 European Table Tennis Championships

Personal information
- Born: 22 July 1986 (age 40) Vienna, Austria
- Height: 1.85 m (6 ft 1 in)
- Weight: 78 kg (172 lb)

Sport
- Sport: Table tennis
- Club: Post SV Mühlhausen
- Playing style: Right-handed shakehand
- Highest ranking: 27 (August 2019)
- Current ranking: 72 (15 July 2025)
Medal record
Men's table tennis
Representing Austria
European Games
Bronze medal – third place	2015 Baku	Team
European Championships
Gold medal – first place	2012 Herning	Doubles
Gold medal – first place	2015 Yekaterinburg	Team
Gold medal – first place	2018 Alicante	Doubles
Silver medal – second place	2013 Schwechat	Doubles
Silver medal – second place	2015 Yekaterinburg	Doubles
Silver medal – second place	2022 Munich	Doubles
Bronze medal – third place	2008 Saint Petersburg	Team
Bronze medal – third place	2011 Gdańsk–Sopot	Team

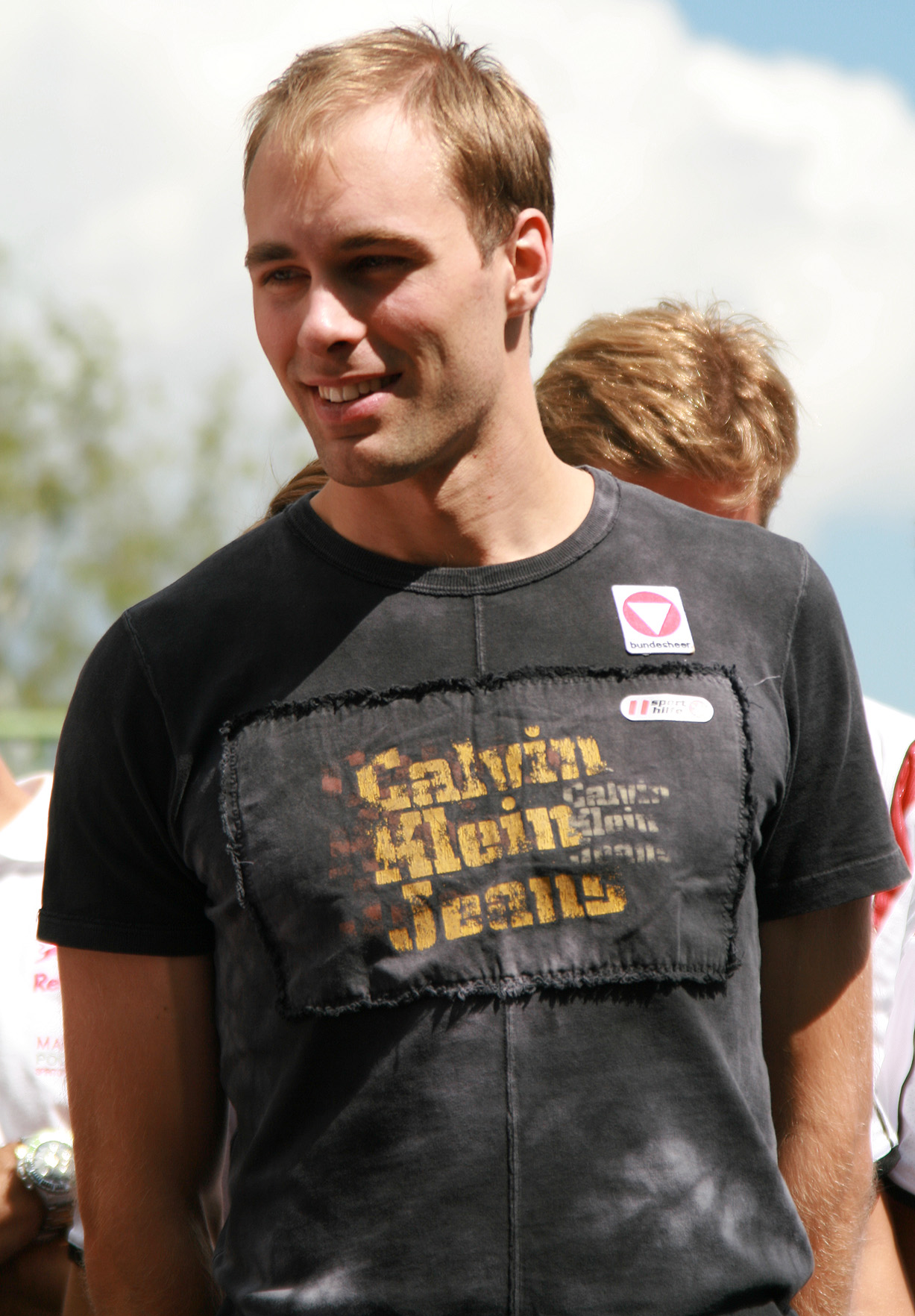
Habesohn in 2008

Daniel Habesohn (born 22 July 1986) is an Austrian table tennis player. He competed at the 2016 Summer Olympics and the 2020 Summer Olympics. Habesohn competed in the 2017 World Table Tennis Championships, upsetting Japanese player and number 15 seed Kenta Matsudaira but he then went on to lose to number 33 seed Lin Gaoyuan. He teamed with Robert Gardos in the men's doubles event, losing in the first round in a close match with the Belarusian duo of Vladimir Samsonov and Pavel Platonov.

In the 2016 Summer Olympics, he competed as part of the Austrian team in the men's team event. Later, in the 2020 Summer Olympics, he participated in the men's singles event where he received a bye in the first round, defeated Clarence Chew in the second round, but eventually lost to Marcos Freitas in the third round.
