= Rebekka Carlsen =

Norwegian table tennis player

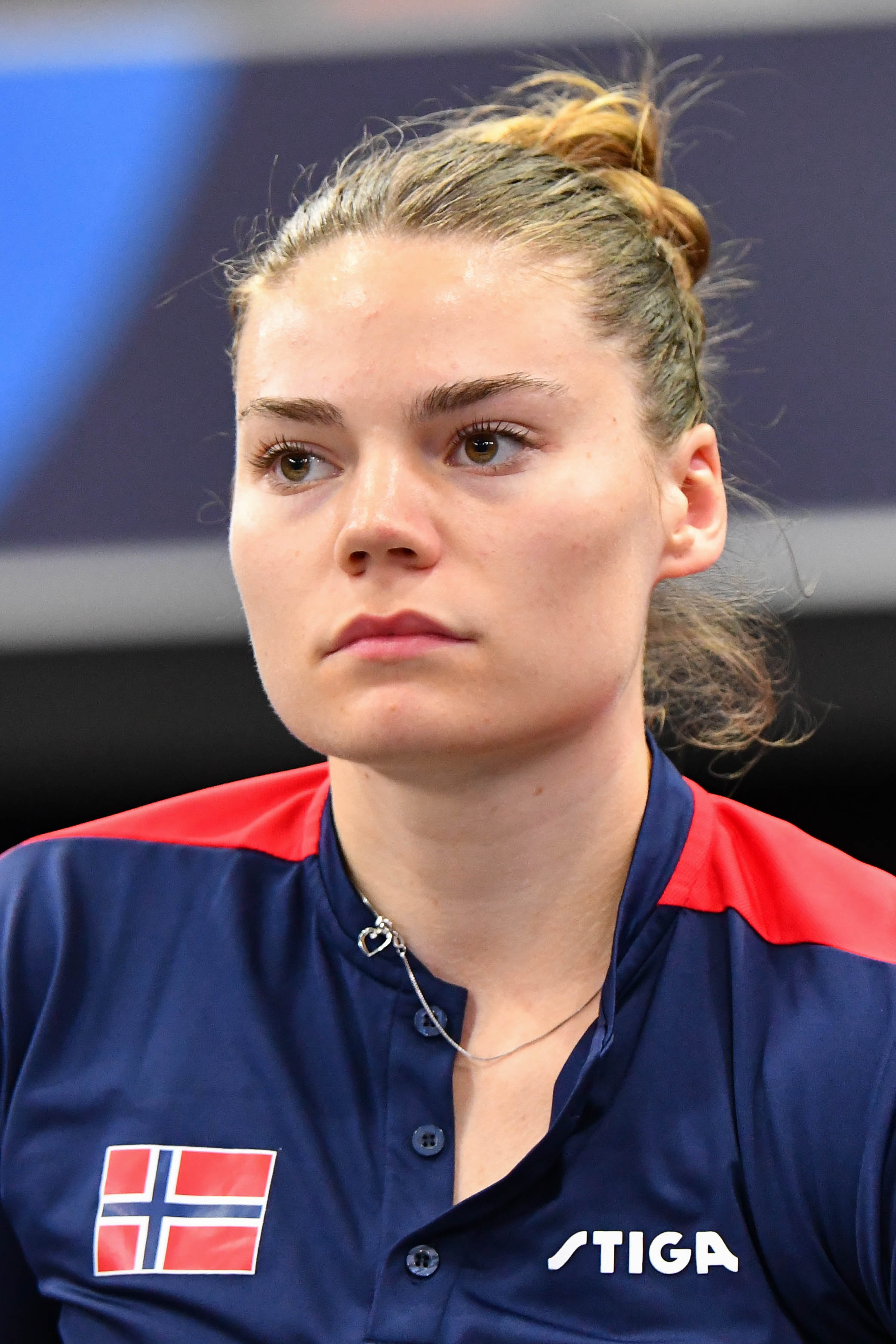
- Carlsen in 2022

Personal information
- Nationality: Norwegian
- Born: 1 September 1999 (age 27)

Sport
- Sport: Table tennis

Rebekka Carlsen (born 1 September 1999) is a Norwegian table tennis player. Her highest career ITTF ranking was 301.
