= 2017 European Table Tennis Championships – Men's team =

The men's team tournament of the 2017 European Table Tennis Championships was held from 13 to 17 September 2017.

All times are local (UTC+1)

== Medalists ==
Event	Gold	Silver	Bronze
Team	Germany; Dimitrij Ovtcharov; Timo Boll; Patrick Franziska; Ruwen Filus; Ricardo Walther	Portugal; Tiago Apolónia; Marcos Freitas; João Monteiro; João Geraldo; Diogo Carvalho	Slovenia; Bojan Tokić; Darko Jorgić; Jan Zibrat; Deni Kozul
Team	Germany; Dimitrij Ovtcharov; Timo Boll; Patrick Franziska; Ruwen Filus; Ricardo Walther	Portugal; Tiago Apolónia; Marcos Freitas; João Monteiro; João Geraldo; Diogo Carvalho	France; Simon Gauzy; Emmanuel Lebesson; Tristan Flore; Quentin Robinot; Alexandre Robinot

== Championship division ==
The top two teams of each group advanced.

=== Preliminary round ===
==== Group A ====
Team	Pld	W	L	GW	GL	Pts
Germany	3	3	0	9	0	6
Croatia	3	2	1	6	5	5
Spain	3	1	2	4	7	4
Belarus	3	0	3	2	9	3

13 September 2017; 13:00	Report	Spain	0–3	Germany
Score by game:
Alvaro Robles	1–3	Ruwen Filus
Carlos Machado	0–3	Dimitrij Ovtcharov
Jesus Cantero	0–3	Patrick Franziska

13 September 2017; 13:00	Report	Belarus	1–3	Croatia
Score by game:
Aliaksandr Khanin	1–3	Tomislav Pucar
Pavel Platonov	1–3	Andrej Gaćina
Gleb Shamruk	3–1	Frane Kojic
Aliaksandr Khanin	0–3	Andrej Gaćina

14 September 2017; 10:00	Report	Croatia	0–3	Germany
Score by game:
Tomislav Kolarek	1–3	Ruwen Filus
Filip Cipin	0–3	Dimitrij Ovtcharov
Frane Kojic	1–3	Ricardo Walther

14 September 2017; 10:00	Report	Belarus	1–3	Spain
Score by game:
Pavel Platonov	3–0	Carlos Machado
Aliaksandr Khanin	1–3	Alvaro Robles
Gleb Shamruk	1–3	Jesus Cantero
Pavel Platonov	1–3	Alvaro Robles

14 September 2017; 19:00	Report	Germany	3–0	Belarus
Score by game:
Patrick Franziska	3–0	Pavel Platonov
Ricardo Walther	3–0	Gleb Shamruk
Timo Boll	3–1	Kiryl Barabanov

14 September 2017; 19:00	Report	Croatia	3–1	Spain
Score by game:
Andrej Gaćina	3–0	Jesus Cantero
Tomislav Pucar	3–2	Alvaro Robles
Tomislav Kolarek	2–3	Marc Duran
Andrej Gaćina	3–2	Alvaro Robles

==== Group B ====
Team	Pld	W	L	GW	GL	Pts
Portugal	3	3	0	9	3	6
Slovenia	3	2	1	6	7	5
Slovakia	3	1	2	6	7	4
Austria	3	0	3	6	9	3

13 September 2017; 13:00	Report	Portugal	3–0	Slovenia
Score by game:
Marcos Freitas	3–1	Darko Jorgic
João Monteiro	3–1	Bojan Tokič
Tiago Apolónia	3–0	Deni Kozul

13 September 2017; 13:00	Report	Austria	2–3	Slovakia
Score by game:
Daniel Habesohn	3–2	Ľubomír Pištej
Robert Gardos	3–2	Peter Sereda
Stefan Fegerl	2–3	Wang Yang
Daniel Habesohn	0–3	Peter Sereda
Robert Gardos	0–3	Ľubomír Pištej
–

14 September 2017; 10:00	Report	Portugal	3–2	Austria
Score by game:
Marcos Freitas	3–1	Robert Gardos
Tiago Apolónia	2–3	Stefan Fegerl
João Monteiro	2–3	Daniel Habesohn
Marcos Freitas	3–2	Stefan Fegerl
Tiago Apolónia	3–2	Robert Gardos
–

14 September 2017; 10:00	Report	Slovenia	3–2	Slovakia
Score by game:
Bojan Tokič	1–3	Ľubomír Pištej
Darko Jorgic	1–3	Wang Yang
Jan Zibrat	3–2	Peter Sereda
Bojan Tokič	3–0	Wang Yang
Darko Jorgic	3–2	Ľubomír Pištej
–

14 September 2017; 19:00	Report	Portugal	3–1	Slovakia
Score by game:
Marcos Freitas	2–3	Wang Yang
João Monteiro	3–1	Ľubomír Pištej
Tiago Apolónia	3–0	Bai He
Marcos Freitas	3–1	Ľubomír Pištej

14 September 2017; 19:00	Report	Slovenia	3–2	Austria
Score by game:
Bojan Tokič	3–0	Robert Gardos
Darko Jorgic	0–3	Stefan Fegerl
Deni Kozul	1–3	Chen Weixing
Bojan Tokič	3–1	Stefan Fegerl
Darko Jorgic	3–1	Robert Gardos
–

==== Group C ====
Team	Pld	W	L	GW	GL	Pts
Sweden	3	3	0	9	0	6
Greece	3	2	1	6	3	5
Russia	3	1	2	3	6	4
Luxembourg	3	0	3	0	9	3

13 September 2017; 16:00	Report	Russia	0–3	Sweden
Score by game:
Sadi Ismailov	2–3	Anton Källberg
Vladimir Sidorenko	0–3	Kristian Karlsson
Denis Ivonin	0–3	Mattias Karlsson

13 September 2017; 16:00	Report	Greece	3–0	Luxembourg
Score by game:
Panagiotis Gionis	3–1	Gilles Michely
Konstantinos Papageorgiou	3–0	Eric Glod
Anastasios Riniotis	3–0	Luka Mladenovic

14 September 2017; 10:00	Report	Greece	0–3	Sweden
Score by game:
Ioannis Sgouropoulos	0–3	Anton Källberg
Panagiotis Gionis	0–3	Kristian Karlsson
Kalinikos Kreanga	1–3	Mattias Karlsson

14 September 2017; 10:00	Report	Russia	3–0	Luxembourg
Score by game:
Grigory Vlasov	3–1	Gilles Michely
Sadi Ismailov	3–1	Eric Glod
Vladimir Sidorenko	3–1	Luka Mladenovic

14 September 2017; 19:00	Report	Sweden	3–0	Luxembourg
Score by game:
Anton Källberg	3–0	Marc Dielissen
Pär Gerell	3–0	Traian Ciociu
Jon Persson	3–0	Luka Mladenovic

14 September 2017; 19:00	Report	Russia	0–3	Greece
Score by game:
Grigory Vlasov	0–3	Konstantinos Papageorgiou
Sadi Ismailov	2–3	Panagiotis Gionis
Vladimir Sidorenko	1–3	Ioannis Sgouropoulos

==== Group D ====
Team	Pld	W	L	GW	GL	Pts
France	3	3	0	9	4	6
Ukraine	3	2	1	8	4	5
Romania	3	1	2	5	7	4
Poland	3	0	3	2	9	3

13 September 2017; 16:00	Report	Poland	1–3	France
Score by game:
Jakub Dyjas	0–3	Simon Gauzy
Wang Zengyi	3–1	Emmanuel Lebesson
Robert Floras	1–3	Tristan Flore
Jakub Dyjas	2–3	Emmanuel Lebesson

13 September 2017; 16:00	Report	Ukraine	3–1	Romania
Score by game:
Kou Lei	3–0	Hunor Szőcs
Viktor Yefimov	1–3	Ovidiu Ionescu
Yevhen Pryshchepa	3–1	Adrian Crişan
Kou Lei	3–1	Ovidiu Ionescu

14 September 2017; 10:00	Report	France	3–1	Romania
Score by game:
Simon Gauzy	3–0	Hunor Szőcs
Tristan Flore	2–3	Ovidiu Ionescu
Emmanuel Lebesson	3–0	Adrian Crişan
Simon Gauzy	3–0	Ovidiu Ionescu

14 September 2017; 10:00	Report	Poland	0–3	Ukraine
Score by game:
Wang Zengyi	2–3	Viktor Yefimov
Daniel Górak	0–3	Kou Lei
Marek Badowski	2–3	Yevhen Pryshchepa

14 September 2017; 19:00	Report	France	3–2	Ukraine
Score by game:
Simon Gauzy	3–0	Viktor Yefimov
Emmanuel Lebesson	1–3	Kou Lei
Tristan Flore	2–3	Yevhen Pryshchepa
Quentin Robinot	3–1	Kou Lei
Emmanuel Lebesson	3–1	Viktor Yefimov
–

14 September 2017; 19:00	Report	Poland	1–3	Romania
Score by game:
Wang Zengyi	3–1	Hunor Szőcs
Daniel Górak	2–3	Ovidiu Ionescu
Marek Badowski	0–3	Adrian Crişan
Wang Zengyi	2–3	Ovidiu Ionescu

=== Knockout stage ===
==== Places 1–8 ====
Quarterfinals
Germany	3
Ukraine	0
Slovenia	3
Sweden	2
France	3
Greece	0
Croatia	1
Portugal	3

Semifinals
Germany	3
Slovenia	2
France	2
Portugal	3

Final
Germany	3
Portugal	0

5th place bracket

Semifinals
Ukraine	1
Sweden	3
Greece	1
Croatia	3

5th place
Sweden	3
Croatia	1
7th place
Ukraine	3
Greece	1

===== Quarterfinals =====
15 September 2017; 16:00	report	Germany	3–0	Ukraine
Score by game:
Timo Boll	3–0	Kou Lei
Dimitrij Ovtcharov	3–0	Viktor Yefimov
Ruwen Filus	3–0	Yevhen Pryshchepa

15 September 2017; 16:00	Report	Slovenia	3–2	Sweden
Score by game:
Bojan Tokič	3–2	Anton Källberg
Darko Jorgic	0–3	Mattias Karlsson
Deni Kozul	0–3	Kristian Karlsson
Bojan Tokič	3–0	Mattias Karlsson
Darko Jorgic	3–1	Pär Gerell
–

15 September 2017; 19:00	Report	France	3–0	Greece
Score by game:
Simon Gauzy	3–0	Ioannis Sgouropoulos
Emmanuel Lebesson	3–0	Panagiotis Gionis
Quentin Robinot	3–0	Konstantinos Papageorgiou

15 September 2017; 19:00	Report	Portugal	3–1	Croatia
Score by game:
Marcos Freitas	3–0	Tomislav Pucar
Tiago Apolónia	2–3	Andrej Gaćina
João Monteiro	3–1	Tomislav Kolarek
Marcos Freitas	3–2	Andrej Gaćina

===== 5th-7th place =====
16 September 2017; 13:00	Report	Ukraine	1–3	Sweden
Score by game:
Viktor Yefimov	0–3	Pär Gerell
Yevhen Pryshchepa	0–3	Jon Persson
Kou Lei	3–2	Anton Källberg
Yevhen Pryshchepa	0–3	Pär Gerell

16 September 2017; 13:00	Report	Greece	1–3	Croatia
Score by game:
Konstantinos Papageorgiou	3–0	Filip Cipin
Kalinikos Kreanga	1–3	Tomislav Pucar
Ioannis Sgouropoulos	2–3	Tomislav Kolarek
Konstantinos Papageorgiou	2–3	Tomislav Pucar

===== Semifinals =====
16 September 2017; 16:00	Report	France	2–3	Portugal
Score by game:
Simon Gauzy	0–3	Tiago Apolónia
Emmanuel Lebesson	1–3	Marcos Freitas
Quentin Robinot	3–2	João Monteiro
Tristan Flore	3–0	Marcos Freitas
Emmanuel Lebesson	2–3	Tiago Apolónia
–

16 September 2017; 19:00	Report	Germany	3–2	Slovenia
Score by game:
Dimitrij Ovtcharov	1–3	Darko Jorgic
Timo Boll	3–0	Bojan Tokić
Patrick Franziska	3–0	Jan Zibrat
Ruwen Filus	1–3	Bojan Tokić
Timo Boll	3–0	Darko Jorgic
–

===== Final =====
17 September 2017; 17:00	Report	Germany	3–0	Portugal
Score by game:
Timo Boll	3–2	Marcos Freitas
Dimitrij Ovtcharov	3–0	Tiago Apolónia
Patrick Franziska	3–1	João Monteiro

===== 5th place =====
17 September 2017; 10:00	Report	Sweden	3–1	Croatia
Score by game:
Jon Persson	3–0	Frane Kojic
Pär Gerell	1–3	Filip Cipin
Anton Källberg	3–0	Tomislav Kolarek
Pär Gerell	3–1	Frane Kojic

===== 7th place =====
17 September 2017; 10:00	Report	Ukraine	3–1	Greece
Score by game:
Viktor Yefimov	1–3	Ioannis Sgouropoulos
Yevhen Pryshchepa	3–2	Anastasios Riniotis
Kou Lei	3–1	Konstantinos Papageorgiou
Yevhen Pryshchepa	3–1	Ioannis Sgouropoulos

==== Places 9–16 ====
Quarterfinals
Russia	1
Austria	3
Belarus	1
Romania	3
Slovakia	2
Poland	3
Luxembourg	0
Spain	3

Semifinals
Austria	3
Romania	1
Poland	1
Spain	3

9th place
Austria	2
Spain	3
11th place
Romania	3
Poland	1

13th place bracket

Semifinals
Russia	3
Belarus	0
Slovakia	3
Luxembourg	1

13th place
Russia	1
Slovakia	3
15th place
Belarus	3
Luxembourg	2

===== Quarterfinals =====
15 September 2017; 13:00	report	Russia	1–3	Austria
Score by game:
Sadi Ismailov	3–2	Andreas Levenko
Artur Abusev	0–3	Daniel Habesohn
Denis Ivonin	1–3	Robert Gardos
Sadi Ismailov	2–3	Daniel Habesohn

15 September 2017; 13:00	report	Belarus	1–3	Romania
Score by game:
Pavel Platonov	2–3	Hunor Szőcs
Aliaksandr Khanin	3–2	Ovidiu Ionescu
Gleb Shamruk	1–3	Adrian Crişan
Pavel Platonov	0–3	Ovidiu Ionescu

15 September 2017; 16:00	Report	Slovakia	2–3	Poland
Score by game:
Wang Yang	1–3	Wang Zengyi
Ľubomír Pištej	2–3	Daniel Górak
Bai He	3–2	Marek Badowski
Ľubomír Pištej	3–2	Wang Zengyi
Wang Yang	3–0	Daniel Górak
–

15 September 2017; 16:00	Report	Luxembourg	0–3	Spain
Score by game:
Eric Glod	2–3	Jesus Cantero
Gilles Michely	0–3	Alvaro Robles
Luka Mladenovic	0–3	Marc Duran

===== 13-15th place =====
16 September 2017; 13:00	Report	Russia	3–0	Belarus
Score by game:
Sadi Ismailov	3–1	Pavel Platonov
Grigory Vlasov	3–1	Aliaksandr Khanin
Vladimir Sidorenko	3–2	Gleb Shamruk

16 September 2017; 16:00	Report	Slovakia	3–1	Luxembourg
Score by game:
Ľubomír Pištej	3–0	Marc Dielissen
Bai He	2–3	Eric Glod
Peter Sereda	3–0	Gilles Michely
Ľubomír Pištej	3–1	Eric Glod

===== Semifinals =====
16 September 2017; 13:00	Report	Austria	3–1	Romania
Score by game:
Daniel Habesohn	3–2	Hunor Szőcs
Andreas Levenko	2–3	Cristian Pletea
Chen Weixing	3–2	Ovidiu Ionescu
Daniel Habesohn	3–1	Cristian Pletea

16 September 2017; 13:00	Report	Poland	1–3	Spain
Score by game:
Daniel Górak	1–3	Alvaro Robles
Wang Zengyi	3–0	Marc Duran
Marek Badowski	0–3	Jesus Cantero
Wang Zengyi	1–3	Alvaro Robles

===== 9th place =====
17 September 2017; 10:00	Report	Austria	2–3	Spain
Score by game:
Daniel Habesohn	3–1	Jesus Cantero
Andreas Levenko	0–3	Alvaro Robles
Stefan Fegerl	3–1	Marc Duran
Daniel Habesohn	1–3	Alvaro Robles
Andreas Levenko	0–3	Jesus Cantero
–

===== 11th place =====
17 September 2017; 10:00	Report	Romania	3–1	Poland
Score by game:
Cristian Pletea	3–0	Marek Badowski
Adrian Crișan	3–0	Daniel Górak
Rareş Şipoş	1–3	Wang Zengyi
Cristian Pletea	3–0	Daniel Górak

===== 13th place =====
17 September 2017; 10:00	Report	Russia	1–3	Slovakia
Score by game:
Vladimir Sidorenko	3–0	Ľubomír Pištej
Denis Ivonin	2–3	Bai He
Artur Abusev	1–3	Peter Sereda
Denis Ivonin	0–3	Ľubomír Pištej

===== 15th place =====
17 September 2017; 10:00	Report	Belarus	3–2	Luxembourg
Score by game:
Aliaksandr Khanin	0–3	Luka Mladenovic
Kiryl Barabanov	2–3	Eric Glod
Gleb Shamruk	3–0	Gilles Michely
Aliaksandr Khanin	3–0	Eric Glod
Pavel Platonov	3–1	Luka Mladenovic
–

== Challenge Division ==
=== Preliminary round ===
==== Group E ====
Team	Pld	W	L	GW	GL	Pts
Denmark	3	3	0	9	2	6
Netherlands	3	2	1	7	3	5
England	3	1	2	4	7	4
Ireland	3	0	3	1	9	3

13 September 2017; 10:00	Report	England	0–3	Netherlands
Score by game:
Sam Walker	1–3	Ewout Oostwouder
David McBeath	1–3	Laurens Tromer
Tom Jarvis	1–3	Rajko Gommers

13 September 2017; 10:00	Report	Ireland	0–3	Denmark
Score by game:
Paul McCreery	0–3	Jonathan Groth
Gavin Maguire	2–3	Tobias Rasmussen
Ashley Robinson	1–3	Anders Lind

13 September 2017; 19:00	Report	England	1–3	Denmark
Score by game:
Sam Walker	3–1	Anders Lind
Tom Jarvis	0–3	Jonathan Groth
David McBeath	0–3	Tobias Rasmussen
Sam Walker	2–3	Jonathan Groth

13 September 2017; 19:00	Report	Netherlands	3–0	Ireland
Score by game:
Laurens Tromer	3–2	Ashley Robinson
Ewout Oostwouder	3–2	Paul McCreery
Rajko Gommers	3–0	Gavin Maguire

14 September 2017; 13:00	Report	Ireland	1–3	England
Score by game:
Ashley Robinson	1–3	David McBeath
Paul McCreery	3–2	Sam Walker
Gavin Maguire	1–3	Helshan Weerasinghe
Ashley Robinson	0–3	Sam Walker

14 September 2017; 13:00	Report	Denmark	3–1	Netherlands
Score by game:
Jonathan Groth	1–3	Ewout Oostwouder
Anders Lind	3–1	Laurens Tromer
Tobias Rasmussen	3–1	Rajko Gommers
Jonathan Groth	3–0	Laurens Tromer

==== Group F ====
Team	Pld	W	L	GW	GL	Pts
Turkey	3	3	0	9	0	6
Czech Republic	3	2	1	6	3	5
Switzerland	3	1	2	3	7	4
Bulgaria	3	0	3	1	9	3

13 September 2017; 10:00	Report	Czech Republic	3–0	Bulgaria
Score by game:
Dmitrij Prokopcov	3–2	Teodor Alexandrov
Tomáš Konečný	3–0	Denislav Kodjabashev
Tomas Polansky	3–0	Petyo Krastev

13 September 2017; 10:00	Report	Switzerland	0–3	Turkey
Score by game:
Lionel Weber	1–3	Ahmet Li
Cédric Tschanz	1–3	Ibrahim Gunduz
Nicolas Champod	0–3	Abdullah Yigenler

13 September 2017; 19:00	Report	Czech Republic	0–3	Turkey
Score by game:
Tomáš Konečný	0–3	Ibrahim Gunduz
Tomas Polansky	0–3	Ahmet Li
Dmitrij Prokopcov	0–3	Abdullah Yigenler

13 September 2017; 19:00	Report	Switzerland	3–1	Bulgaria
Score by game:
Lionel Weber	3–0	Petyo Krastev
Nicolas Champod	1–3	Teodor Alexandrov
Filip Karin	3–1	Denislav Kodjabashev
Lionel Weber	3–1	Teodor Alexandrov

14 September 2017; 13:00	Report	Switzerland	0–3	Czech Republic
Score by game:
Lionel Weber	1–3	Tomáš Tregler
Filip Karin	0–3	Jakub Kleprlik
Cédric Tschanz	0–3	Tomas Polansky

14 September 2017; 13:00	Report	Bulgaria	0–3	Turkey
Score by game:
Teodor Alexandrov	0–3	Ahmet Li
Petyo Krastev	1–3	Ibrahim Gunduz
Denislav Kodjabashev	2–3	Abdullah Yigenler

==== Group G ====
Team	Pld	W	L	GW	GL	Pts
Belgium	3	3	0	9	2	6
Hungary	3	2	1	8	3	5
Finland	3	1	2	3	6	4
Estonia	3	0	3	0	9	3

13 September 2017; 10:00	Report	Finland	0–3	Hungary
Score by game:
Miikka O'Connor	0–3	Tamas Lakatos
Mika Räsänen	0–3	Adam Szudi
Alex Naumi	0–3	Bence Majoros

13 September 2017; 10:00	Report	Belgium	3–0	Estonia
Score by game:
Cedric Nuytinck	3–0	Rivo Saaremäe
Robin Devos	3–2	Aleksandr Lusin
Florent Lambiet	3–0	Aleksandr Smirnov

13 September 2017; 19:00	Report	Belgium	3–2	Hungary
Score by game:
Cedric Nuytinck	3–0	Bence Majoros
Florent Lambiet	1–3	Adam Szudi
Martin Allegro	1–3	Tamas Lakatos
Cedric Nuytinck	3–1	Adam Szudi
Florent Lambiet	3–2	Bence Majoros
–

13 September 2017; 19:00	Report	Finland	3–0	Estonia
Score by game:
Benedek Oláh	3–1	Aleksandr Lusin
Alex Naumi	3–2	Aleksandr Smirnov
Miikka O'Connor	3–0	Rivo Saaremäe

14 September 2017; 16:00	Report	Estonia	0–3	Hungary
Score by game:
Aleksandr Smirnov	0–3	Nándor Ecseki
Aleksandr Lusin	1–3	Adam Szudi
Rivo Saaremäe	0–3	Bence Majoros

14 September 2017; 16:00	Report	Finland	0–3	Belgium
Score by game:
Alex Naumi	2–3	Robin Devos
Miikka O'Connor	0–3	Cedric Nuytinck
Mika Räsänen	0–3	Florent Lambiet

==== Group H ====
Team	Pld	W	L	GW	GL	Pts
Italy	3	3	0	9	0	6
Lithuania	3	2	1	6	6	5
Israel	3	1	2	5	6	4
Serbia	3	0	3	1	9	3

13 September 2017; 10:00	Report	Israel	0–3	Italy
Score by game:
Omri Ben Ari	1–3	Leonardo Mutti
Michael Tauber	2–3	Mihai Bobocica
Mathan Simon	2–3	Marco Rech Daldosso

13 September 2017; 10:00	Report	Serbia	1–3	Lithuania
Score by game:
Marko Petkov	3–1	Tomas Mikutis
Ivor Katić	2–3	Alfredas Udra
Ilija Majstorović	2–3	Medardas Stankevicius
Marko Petkov	2–3	Alfredas Udra

13 September 2017; 19:00	Report	Serbia	0–3	Italy
Score by game:
Marko Popović	0–3	Leonardo Mutti
Ivor Katić	1–3	Mihai Bobocica
Ilija Majstorović	0–3	Marco Rech Daldosso

13 September 2017; 19:00	Report	Israel	2–3	Lithuania
Score by game:
Omri Ben Ari	3–0	Alfredas Udra
Michael Tauber	2–3	Tomas Mikutis
Shimon Rabinovich	2–3	Medardas Stankevicius
Omri Ben Ari	3–1	Tomas Mikutis
Michael Tauber	1–3	Alfredas Udra
–

14 September 2017; 16:00	Report	Italy	3–0	Lithuania
Score by game:
Mihai Bobocica	3–0	Alfredas Udra
Leonardo Mutti	3–0	Medardas Stankevicius
Marco Rech Daldosso	3–0	Tomas Mikutis

14 September 2017; 16:00	Report	Serbia	0–3	Israel
Score by game:
Marko Petkov	1–3	Shimon Rabinovich
Ivor Katić	0–3	Omri Ben Ari
Ilija Majstorović	0–3	Michael Tauber

=== Knockout stage ===
==== Places 17–24 ====
Quarterfinals
Denmark	3
Lithuania	1
Czech Republic	1
Belgium	3
Italy	0
Hungary	3
Netherlands	0
Turkey	3

Semifinals
Denmark	3
Belgium	1
Hungary	1
Turkey	3

17th place
Denmark	3
Turkey	0
19th place
Belgium	3
Hungary	1

21st place bracket

Semifinals
Lithuania	0
Czech Republic	3
Italy	3
Netherlands	1

21st place
Czech Republic	3
Italy	1
23rd place
Lithuania	2
Netherlands	3

===== Quarterfinals =====
15 September 2017; 10:00	Report	Denmark	3–1	Lithuania
Score by game:
Anders Lind	3–0	Medardas Stankevicius
Jonathan Groth	3–0	Tomas Mikutis
Tobias Rasmussen	0–3	Alfredas Udra
Anders Lind	3–2	Tomas Mikutis

15 September 2017; 10:00	Report	Czech Republic	3–1	Belgium
Score by game:
Tomas Polansky	3–2	Cedric Nuytinck
Tomáš Konečný	3–0	Florent Lambiet
Tomas Tregler	0–3	Robin Devos
Tomas Konecny	3–0	Cedric Nuytinck

15 September 2017; 10:00	Report	Italy	0–3	Hungary
Score by game:
Leonardo Mutti	1–3	Adam Szudi
Mihai Bobocica	2–3	Tamas Lakatos
Marco Rech Daldosso	0–3	Bence Majoros

15 September 2017; 10:00	Report	Netherlands	0–3	Turkey
Score by game:
Ewout Oostwouder	2–3	Ibrahim Gunduz
Laurens Tromer	1–3	Ahmet Li
Rajko Gommers	1–3	Abdullah Yigenler

===== 21-24th place =====
15 September 2017; 19:00	Report	Lithuania	0–3	Czech Republic
Score by game:
Alfredas Udra	1–3	Dmitrij Prokopcov
Medardas Stankevicius	0–3	Tomas Polansky
Matas Skucas	1–3	Tomáš Konečný

15 September 2017; 19:00	Report	Italy	3–1	Netherlands
Score by game:
Leonardo Mutti	3–0	Laurens Tromer
Mihai Bobocica	3–0	Ewout Oostwouder
Marco Rech Daldosso	2–3	Rajko Gommers
Mihai Bobocica	3–1	Laurens Tromer

===== Semifinals =====
15 September 2017; 19:00	Report	Denmark	3–1	Belgium
Score by game:
Anders Lind	1–3	Cedric Nuytinck
Jonathan Groth	3–0	Florent Lambiet
Tobias Rasmussen	3–0	Martin Allegro
Jonathan Groth	3–0	Cedric Nuytinck

15 September 2017; 19:00	Report	Hungary	1–3	Turkey
Score by game:
Adam Szudi	0–3	Ibrahim Gunduz
Bence Majoros	0–3	Ahmet Li
Tamas Lakatos	3–1	Abdullah Yigenler
Adam Szudi	0–3	Ahmet Li

===== 17th place =====
17 September 2017; 10:00	Report	Denmark	3–0	Turkey
Score by game:
Tobias Rasmussen	3–1	Ahmet Li
Jonathan Groth	3–1	Ibrahim Gunduz
Anders Lind	3–0	Abdullah Yigenler

===== 19th place =====
16 September 2017; 13:00	Report	Belgium	3–1	Hungary
Score by game:
Florent Lambiet	3–0	Nandor Ecseki
Martin Allegro	3–2	Bence Majoros
Robin Devos	2–3	Adam Szudi
Florent Lambiet	3–2	Bence Majoros

===== 21st place =====
16 September 2017; 13:00	Report	Czech Republic	3–1	Italy
Score by game:
Tomáš Tregler	3–1	Leonardo Mutti
Tomáš Polansky	0–3	Mihai Bobocica
Jakub Kleprlik	3–2	Marco Rech Daldosso
Tomáš Tregler	3–1	Mihai Bobocica

===== 23rd place =====
16 September 2017; 13:00	Report	Lithuania	2–3	Netherlands
Score by game:
Medardas Stankevicius	1–3	Laurens Tromer
Tomas Mikutis	3–2	Rajko Gommers
Matas Skucas	1–3	Ewout Oostwouder
Medardas Stankevicius	3–2	Rajko Gommers
Tomas Mikutis	2–3	Laurens Tromer
–

==== Places 25–32 ====
Quarterfinals
England	3
Serbia	0
Estonia	1
Switzerland	3
Israel	3
Bulgaria	1
Ireland	2
Finland	3

Semifinals
England	3
Switzerland	2
Israel	2
Finland	3

25th place
England	3
Finland	2
27th place
Switzerland	2
Israel	3

29th place bracket

Semifinals
Serbia	3
Estonia	1
Bulgaria	3
Ireland	0

29th place
Serbia	3
Bulgaria	0
31st place
Estonia	1
Ireland	3

===== Quarterfinals =====
15 September 2017; 10:00	Report	England	3–0	Serbia
Score by game:
Sam Walker	3–2	Marko Popović
David McBeath	3–1	Marko Petkov
Tom Jarvis	3–2	Ilija Majstorović

15 September 2017; 10:00	Report	Estonia	1–3	Switzerland
Score by game:
Lionel Weber	0–3	Aleksandr Lusin
Nicolas Champod	3–2	Aleksandr Smirnov
Filip Karin	1–3	Rivo Saaremäe
Lionel Weber	1–3	Aleksandr Smirnov

15 September 2017; 10:00	Report	Israel	3–1	Bulgaria
Score by game:
Shimon Rabinovich	1–3	Petyo Krastev
Omri Ben Ari	3–1	Teodor Alexandrov
Michael Tauber	3–1	Denislav Kodjabashev
Omri Ben Ari	3–0	Petyo Krastev

15 September 2017; 10:00	Report	Ireland	2–3	Finland
Score by game:
Ashley Robinson	3–1	Miikka O'Connor
Paul McCreery	0–3	Benedek Oláh
Gavin Maguire	0–3	Alex Naumi
Paul McCreery	3–0	Miikka O'Connor
Ashley Robinson	0–3	Benedek Oláh
–

===== 29-32nd place =====
15 September 2017; 16:00	Report	Serbia	3–1	Estonia
Score by game:
Ivor Katić	3–1	Aleksandr Smirnov
Marko Petkov	1–3	Aleksandr Lusin
Marko Popović	3–0	Rivo Saaremäe
Ivor Katić	3–2	Aleksandr Lusin

15 September 2017; 16:00	Report	Bulgaria	3–0	Ireland
Score by game:
Petyo Krastev	3–2	Ashley Robinson
Teodor Alexandrov	3–1	Paul McCreery
Denislav Kodjabashev	3–0	Gavin Maguire

===== Semifinals =====
15 September 2017; 16:00	Report	England	3–2	Switzerland
Score by game:
Sam Walker	3–0	Filip Karin
David McBeath	2–3	Lionel Weber
Tom Jarvis	3–0	Cédric Tschanz
Sam Walker	2–3	Lionel Weber
David McBeath	3–2	Filip Karin
–

15 September 2017; 16:00	Report	Israel	2–3	Finland
Score by game:
Michael Tauber	3–0	Alex Naumi
Omri Ben Ari	0–3	Benedek Oláh
Mathan Simon	0–3	Miikka O'Connor
Omri Ben Ari	3–1	Alex Naumi
Michael Tauber	1–3	Benedek Oláh
–

===== 25th place =====
16 September 2017; 10:00	Report	England	3–2	Finland
Score by game:
Sam Walker	3–0	Alex Naumi
Tom Jarvis	0–3	Benedek Oláh
Helshan Weerasinghe	3–0	Miikka O'Connor
Sam Walker	2–3	Benedek Oláh
Tom Jarvis	3–1	Alex Naumi
–

===== 27th place =====
16 September 2017; 10:00	Report	Switzerland	2–3	Israel
Score by game:
Nicolas Champod	1–3	Mathan Simon
Lionel Weber	3–2	Michael Tauber
Cédric Tschanz	0–3	Shimon Rabinovich
Lionel Weber	3–1	Mathan Simon
Nicolas Champod	1–3	Michael Tauber
–

===== 29th place =====
16 September 2017; 10:00	Report	Serbia	3–0	Bulgaria
Score by game:
Ilija Majstorović	3–2	Teodor Alexandrov
Ivor Katić	3–2	Petyo Krastev
Marko Popović	3–1	Denislav Kodjabashev

===== 31st place =====
16 September 2017; 10:00	Report	Estonia	1–3	Ireland
Score by game:
Aleksandr Smirnov	3–0	Ashley Robinson
Aleksandr Lusin	0–3	Paul McCreery
Rivo Saaremäe	1–3	Gavin Maguire
Aleksandr Smirnov	1–3	Paul McCreery

== Standard Division ==
=== Preliminary round ===
==== Group I ====
Team	Pld	W	L	GW	GL	Pts
Azerbaijan	4	3	1	11	7	7
Montenegro	4	3	1	11	9	7
Latvia	4	2	2	10	10	6
Norway	4	1	3	8	10	5
Cyprus	4	1	3	7	11	5

13 September 2017; 13:00	Report	Latvia	2–3	Cyprus
Score by game:
Arturs Reinholds	3–2	Marios Yiangou
Olegs Kartuzovs	0–3	Hristo Hristonov
Leonids Maslovs	3–0	Yiangos Yiangou
Olegs Kartuzovs	2–3	Marios Yiangou
Arturs Reinholds	2–3	Hristo Hristonov
–

13 September 2017; 13:00	Report	Azerbaijan	3–2	Montenegro
Score by game:
Wang Chenxi	1–3	Filip Radović
Yang Xinyu	3–1	Luka Bakić
Sadikh Sadigov	0–3	Branko Cubović
Wang Chenxi	3–1	Luka Bakić
Yang Xinyu	3–1	Filip Radović
–

14 September 2017; 13:00	Report	Latvia	3–2	Azerbaijan
Score by game:
Olegs Kartuzovs	1–3	Yang Xinyu
Arturs Reinholds	3–0	Wang Chenxi
Leonids Maslovs	3–0	Sadikh Sadigov
Arturs Reinholds	0–3	Yang Xinyu
Olegs Kartuzovs	3–0	Wang Chenxi
–

14 September 2017; 13:00	Report	Norway	3–1	Cyprus
Score by game:
Marcus Wærstad	1–3	Marios Yiangou
Eskil Lindholm	3–0	Hristo Hristonov
Adrian Wetzel	3–2	Yiangos Yiangou
Eskil Lindholm	3–1	Marios Yiangou

15 September 2017; 10:00	Report	Norway	2–3	Montenegro
Score by game:
Eskil Lindholm	3–2	Filip Radović
Marcus Wærstad	1–3	Luka Bakić
Sondre Berner	3–0	Branko Cubović
Adrian Wetzel	2–3	Luka Bakić
Marcus Wærstad	2–3	Filip Radović
–

15 September 2017; 10:00	Report	Azerbaijan	3–1	Cyprus
Score by game:
Yang Xinyu	3–0	Hristo Hristonov
Wang Chenxi	3–1	Marios Yiangou
Sadikh Sadigov	0–3	Yiangos Yiangou
Yang Xinyu	3–2	Marios Yiangou

15 September 2017; 16:00	Report	Latvia	3–2	Norway
Score by game:
Olegs Kartuzovs	0–3	Eskil Lindholm
Arturs Reinholds	3–2	Marcus Wærstad
Leonids Maslovs	3–0	Sondre Berner
Arturs Reinholds	2–3	Eskil Lindholm
Olegs Kartuzovs	3–0	Marcus Wærstad
–

15 September 2017; 16:00	Report	Montenegro	3–2	Cyprus
Score by game:
Filip Radović	3–1	Marios Yiangou
Luka Bakić	2–3	Hristo Hristonov
Branko Cubović	0–3	Yiangos Yiangou
Luka Bakić	3–2	Marios Yiangou
Filip Radović	3–2	Hristo Hristonov
–

16 September 2017; 10:00	Report	Latvia	2–3	Montenegro
Score by game:
Arturs Reinholds	3–2	Luka Bakić
Olegs Kartuzovs	2–3	Filip Radović
Leonids Maslovs	3–0	Branko Cubović
Olegs Kartuzovs	2–3	Luka Bakić
Arturs Reinholds	1–3	Filip Radović
–

16 September 2017; 10:00	Report	Norway	1–3	Azerbaijan
Score by game:
Adrian Wetzel	1–3	Yang Xinyu
Marcus Wærstad	1–3	Wang Chenxi
Sondre Berner	3–1	Sadikh Sadigov
Marcus Wærstad	0–3	Yang Xinyu

==== Group J ====
Team	Pld	W	L	GW	GL	Pts
Bosnia and Herzegovina	4	4	0	12	1	8
Scotland	4	3	1	9	4	7
Wales	4	2	2	8	8	6
Macedonia	4	1	3	3	10	5
Kosovo	4	0	4	1	12	4

13 September 2017; 13:00	Report	Scotland	3–0	Macedonia
Score by game:
Colin Dalgleish	3–1	Zhivko Apostoloski
Niall Cameron	3–2	Kristijan Stanojkovski
Calum Morrison	3–0	Petar Kostovski

13 September 2017; 13:00	Report	Kosovo	0–3	Bosnia and Herzegovina
Score by game:
Baton Citaku	0–3	Armin Aličić
Yll Dragidella	0–3	Admir Duranspahic
Kreshnik Mahmuti	0–3	Edin Konjic

14 September 2017; 13:00	Report	Scotland	3–0	Kosovo
Score by game:
Niall Cameron	3–0	Baton Citaku
Colin Dalgleish	3–1	Yll Dragidella
Calum Morrison	3–0	Kreshnik Mahmuti

14 September 2017; 13:00	Report	Wales	3–0	Macedonia
Score by game:
Callum Evans	3–0	Sasho Stojanovski
Daniel O'Connell	3–0	Kristijan Stanojkovski
Joshua Stacey	3–2	Zhivko Apostoloski

15 September 2017; 10:00	Report	Wales	1–3	Bosnia and Herzegovina
Score by game:
Daniel O'Connell	0–3	Admir Duranspahic
Callum Evans	3–1	Armin Aličić
Dean Cundy	2–3	Edin Konjic
Callum Evans	0–3	Admir Duranspahic

15 September 2017; 10:00	Report	Kosovo	1–3	Macedonia
Score by game:
Baton Citaku	3–0	Sasho Stojanovski
Yll Dragidella	2–3	Petar Kostovski
Kreshnik Mahmuti	2–3	Zhivko Apostoloski
Baton Citaku	2–3	Petar Kostovski

15 September 2017; 16:00	Report	Scotland	3–1	Wales
Score by game:
Niall Cameron	3–0	Daniel O'Connell
Colin Dalgleish	2–3	Callum Evans
Calum Morrison	3–1	Dean Cundy
Colin Dalgleish	3–0	Daniel O'Connell

15 September 2017; 16:00	Report	Bosnia and Herzegovina	3–0	Macedonia
Score by game:
Admir Duranspahic	3–0	Zhivko Apostoloski
Edin Konjic	3–1	Petar Kostovski
Armin Aličić	3–0	Sasho Stojanovski

16 September 2017; 10:00	Report	Scotland	0–3	Bosnia and Herzegovina
Score by game:
Niall Cameron	0–3	Admir Duranspahic
Colin Dalgleish	1–3	Edin Konjic
Calum Morrison	2–3	Armin Aličić

16 September 2017; 10:00	Report	Wales	3–0	Kosovo
Score by game:
Joshua Stacey	3–0	Yll Dragidella
Callum Evans	3–0	Baton Citaku
Dean Cundy	3–0	Kreshnik Mahmuti

=== Knockout stage ===
==== Places 33–36 ====
Semifinals
Azerbaijan	3
Scotland	1
Montenegro	1
Bosnia and Herzegovina	3

33rd place
Azerbaijan	3
Bosnia and Herzegovina	2
35th place
Scotland	1
Montenegro	3

37th place bracket

Semifinals
Latvia	3
Macedonia	0
Norway	3
Wales	2

37th place
Latvia	3
Norway	2
39th place
Macedonia	0
Wales	3

===== 37-40th place =====
16 September 2017; 16:00	Report	Latvia	3–0	Macedonia
Score by game:
Olegs Kartuzovs	3–0	Zhivko Apostoloski
Arturs Reinholds	3–0	Petar Kostovski
Leonids Maslovs	3–0	Kristijan Stanojkovski

16 September 2017; 16:00	Report	Norway	3–2	Wales
Score by game:
Sondre Berner	1–3	Callum Evans
Adrian Wetzel	3–0	Joshua Stacey
Marcus Wærstad	3–1	Daniel O'Connell
Adrian Wetzel	0–3	Callum Evans
Sondre Berner	3–2	Joshua Stacey
–

===== Semifinals =====
16 September 2017; 16:00	Report	Azerbaijan	3–1	Scotland
Score by game:
Wang Chenxi	3–2	Colin Dalgleish
Yang Xinyu	3–0	Niall Cameron
Sadikh Sadigov	1–3	Calum Morrison
Yang Xinyu	3–1	Colin Dalgleish

16 September 2017; 16:00	Report	Montenegro	1–3	Bosnia and Herzegovina
Score by game:
Filip Radović	1–3	Admir Duranspahic
Luka Bakić	3–2	Armin Aličić
Branko Cubović	0–3	Edin Konjic
Luka Bakić	1–3	Admir Duranspahic

===== 33rd place =====
17 September 2017; 10:00	Report	Azerbaijan	3–2	Bosnia and Herzegovina
Score by game:
Yang Xinyu	3–0	Armin Aličić
Wang Chenxi	2–3	Admir Duranspahic
Sadikh Sadigov	0–3	Edin Konjic
Yang Xinyu	3–1	Admir Duranspahic
Wang Chenxi	3–0	Armin Aličić
–

===== 35th place =====
16 September 2017; 10:00	Report	Montenegro	3–1	Scotland
Score by game:
Luka Bakić	3–0	Niall Cameron
Filip Radović	3–2	Colin Dalgleish
Branko Cubović	2–3	Calum Morrison
Luka Bakić	3–2	Colin Dalgleish

===== 37th place =====
17 September 2017; 10:00	Report	Latvia	3–2	Norway
Score by game:
Arturs Reinholds	0–3	Marcus Wærstad
Olegs Kartuzovs	3–0	Adrian Wetzel
Leonids Maslovs	0–3	Sondre Berner
Olegs Kartuzovs	3–1	Marcus Wærstad
Arturs Reinholds	3–1	Adrian Wetzel
–

===== 39th place =====
16 September 2017; 10:00	Report	Macedonia	0–3	Wales
Score by game:
Zhivko Apostoloski	0–3	Callum Evans
Petar Kostovski	0–3	Joshua Stacey
Kristijan Stanojkovski	0–3	Dean Cundy
