= 2016 World Team Table Tennis Championships – Men's team =

Men's team at the 2016 World Team Table Tennis Championships
- Venue: Malawati Stadium
- Location: Shah Alam, Malaysia
- Dates: 28 February – 6 March

Medalists
gold medal	Fan Zhendong; Fang Bo; Ma Long; Xu Xin; Zhang Jike	China
silver medal	Kenta Matsudaira; Jun Mizutani; Koki Niwa; Yuya Oshima; Maharu Yoshimura	Japan
bronze medal	Jang Woo-jin; Jeong Sang-eun; Joo Sae-hyuk; Jung Young-sik; Lee Sang-su	South Korea
bronze medal	Alan Cooke; Paul Drinkhall; Liam Pitchford; Sam Walker	England

The men's team tournament of the 2016 World Team Table Tennis Championships was held from 28 February to 6 March 2016.

All times are local (UTC+8)

== Championship division ==
The top three teams of each group advanced.

=== Preliminary round ===
==== Group A ====
Team	Pld	W	L	GW	GL	Pts
China	5	5	0	15	0	10
North Korea	5	4	1	12	8	9
Austria	5	3	2	9	7	8
Czech Republic	5	2	3	8	11	7
Chinese Taipei	5	1	4	6	13	6
Greece	5	0	5	4	15	5

28 February 2016; 13:00	Report	China	3–0	Greece
Score by game:
Xu Xin	3–1	Kalinikos Kreanga
Zhang Jike	3–0	Ioannis Sgouropoulos
Fan Zhendong	3–1	Panagiotis Gionis

28 February 2016; 13:00	Report	Austria	3–0	Czech Republic
Score by game:
Stefan Fegerl	3–0	Tomáš Konečný
Robert Gardos	3–0	Lubomír Jančařík
Werner Schlager	3–0	Dmitrij Prokopcov

28 February 2016; 13:00	Report	Chinese Taipei	2–3	North Korea
Score by game:
Chiang Hung-chieh	1–3	Pak Sin-hyok
Chen Chien-an	3–2	Choe II
Lin Yun-ju	1–3	Kang Wi-hun
Chen Chien-an	3–2	Pak Sin-hyok
Chiang Hung-chieh	2–3	Choe II
–

29 February 2016; 10:00	Report	China	3–0	North Korea
Score by game:
Ma Long	3–0	Choe II
Fan Zhendong	3–0	Pak Sin-hyok
Fang Bo	3–1	Kang Wi-hun

29 February 2016; 10:00	Report	Austria	3–0	Greece
Score by game:
Stefan Fegerl	3–0	Konstantinos Papageorgiou
Robert Gardos	3–1	Panagiotis Gionis
Werner Schlager	3–1	Kalinikos Kreanga

29 February 2016; 10:00	Report	Chinese Taipei	0–3	Czech Republic
Score by game:
Chiang Hung-chieh	1–3	Dmitrij Prokopcov
Chen Chien-an	0–3	Lubomír Jančařík
Liao Cheng-ting	2–3	Tomáš Konečný

29 February 2016; 16:30	Report	China	3–0	Chinese Taipei
Score by game:
Xu Xin	3–1	Liao Cheng-ting
Zhang Jike	3–1	Chen Chien-an
Fan Zhendong	3–0	Yang Tzu-yi

29 February 2016; 16:30	Report	Austria	0–3	North Korea
Score by game:
Stefan Fegerl	2–3	Pak Sin-hyok
Robert Gardos	1–3	Choe II
Werner Schlager	0–3	Kang Wi-hun

29 February 2016; 16:30	Report	Greece	2–3	Czech Republic
Score by game:
Kalinikos Kreanga	2–3	Dmitrij Prokopcov
Panagiotis Gionis	3–0	Tomáš Konečný
Konstantinos Papageorgiou	3–1	Lubomír Jančařík
Panagiotis Gionis	1–3	Dmitrij Prokopcov
Kalinikos Kreanga	1–3	Tomáš Konečný
–

1 March 2016; 19:30	Report	China	3–0	Czech Republic
Score by game:
Zhang Jike	3–0	Lubomír Jančařík
Xu Xin	3–0	Pavel Širůček
Fan Zhendong	3–0	Tomáš Konečný

1 March 2016; 19:30	Report	Austria	3–1	Chinese Taipei
Score by game:
Robert Gardos	2–3	Chen Chien-an
Stefan Fegerl	3–1	Chiang Hung-chieh
Chen Weixing	3–2	Liao Cheng-ting
Stefan Fegerl	3–1	Chen Chien-an

1 March 2016; 19:30	Report	Greece	1–3	North Korea
Score by game:
Panagiotis Gionis	0–3	Pak Sin-hyok
Ioannis Sgouropoulos	0–3	Choe II
Konstantinos Papageorgiou	3–2	Kang Wi-hun
Ioannis Sgouropoulos	0–3	Pak Sin-hyok

2 March 2016; 19:30	Report	China	3–0	Austria
Score by game:
Ma Long	3–0	Robert Gardos
Zhang Jike	3–1	Stefan Fegerl
Xu Xin	3–0	Chen Weixing

2 March 2016; 19:30	Report	Chinese Taipei	3–1	Greece
Score by game:
Liao Cheng-ting	0–3	Panagiotis Gionis
Chiang Hung-chieh	3–1	Konstantinos Papageorgiou
Yang Tzu-yi	3–2	Ioannis Sgouropoulos
Chiang Hung-chieh	3–0	Panagiotis Gionis

2 March 2016; 19:30	Report	Czech Republic	2–3	North Korea
Score by game:
Pavel Širůček	0–3	Pak Sin-hyok
Lubomír Jančařík	3–2	Choe II
Tomáš Konečný	3–2	Kang Wi-hun
Lubomír Jančařík	1–3	Pak Sin-hyok
Pavel Širůček	2–3	Choe II
–

==== Group B ====
Team	Pld	W	L	GW	GL	Pts
France	5	5	0	15	3	10
Sweden	5	3	2	13	7	8
England	5	3	2	10	8	8
Germany	5	3	2	11	9	8
Denmark	5	1	4	5	13	6
Malaysia	5	0	5	1	15	5

28 February 2016; 13:00	Report	Germany	3–1	Denmark
Score by game:
Bastian Steger	3–1	Mikkel Hindersson
Patrick Franziska	3–1	Claus Nielsen
Ruwen Filus	0–3	Jonathan Groth
Bastian Steger	3–0	Claus Nielsen

28 February 2016; 13:00	Report	Sweden	3–1	England
Score by game:
Kristian Karlsson	0–3	Liam Pitchford
Mattias Karlsson	3–0	Paul Drinkhall
Jon Persson	3–0	Sam Walker
Kristian Karlsson	3–1	Paul Drinkhall

28 February 2016; 13:00	Report	France	3–0	Malaysia
Score by game:
Emmanuel Lebesson	3–0	Muhd Ibrahim
Simon Gauzy	3–1	Leong Chee Feng
Tristan Flore	3–1	Muhamad Haiqal

29 February 2016; 10:00	Report	Germany	3–0	Malaysia
Score by game:
Steffen Mengel	3–0	Muhamad Haiqal
Ruwen Filus	3–0	Leong Chee Feng
Timo Boll	3–0	Muhd Ibrahim

29 February 2016; 10:00	Report	Sweden	3–0	Denmark
Score by game:
Kristian Karlsson	3–2	Jonathan Groth
Mattias Karlsson	3–2	Tobias Rasmussen
Anton Kallberg	3–2	Mikkel Hindersson

29 February 2016; 10:00	Report	France	3–0	England
Score by game:
Emmanuel Lebesson	3–2	Liam Pitchford
Simon Gauzy	3–0	Paul Drinkhall
Tristan Flore	3–0	Sam Walker

29 February 2016; 19:30	Report	Germany	1–3	France
Score by game:
Steffen Mengel	2–3	Simon Gauzy
Timo Boll	0–3	Emmanuel Lebesson
Ruwen Filus	3–0	Benjamin Brossier
Timo Boll	2–3	Simon Gauzy

29 February 2016; 19:30	Report	Sweden	3–0	Malaysia
Score by game:
Jon Persson	3–0	Leong Chee Feng
Anton Kallberg	3–1	Muhamad Haiqal
Mattias Karlsson	3–1	Muhd Ibrahim

29 February 2016; 19:30	Report	Denmark	1–3	England
Score by game:
Jonathan Groth	3–2	Paul Drinkhall
Tobias Rasmussen	1–3	Liam Pitchford
Mikkel Hindersson	1–3	Sam Walker
Jonathan Groth	1–3	Liam Pitchford

1 March 2016; 13:00	Report	Germany	1–3	England
Score by game:
Bastian Steger	2–3	Paul Drinkhall
Ruwen Filus	3–1	Liam Pitchford
Patrick Franziska	1–3	Sam Walker
Bastian Steger	1–3	Liam Pitchford

1 March 2016; 13:00	Report	Sweden	2–3	France
Score by game:
Anton Kallberg	2–3	Emmanuel Lebesson
Mattias Karlsson	3–2	Simon Gauzy
Jon Persson	3–1	Tristan Flore
Anton Kallberg	0–3	Simon Gauzy
Mattias Karlsson	2–3	Emmanuel Lebesson
–

1 March 2016; 13:00	Report	Denmark	3–1	Malaysia
Score by game:
Mikkel Hindersson	3–2	Leong Chee Feng
Tobias Rasmussen	3–0	Muhamad Haiqal
Claus Nielsen	1–3	Muhd Ibrahim
Tobias Rasmussen	3–0	Leong Chee Feng

2 March 2016; 13:00	Report	Germany	3–2	Sweden
Score by game:
Bastian Steger	3–0	Jon Persson
Ruwen Filus	1–3	Kristian Karlsson
Steffen Mengel	0–3	Mattias Karlsson
Ruwen Filus	3–2	Jon Persson
Bastian Steger	3–2	Kristian Karlsson
–

2 March 2016; 13:00	Report	France	3–0	Denmark
Score by game:
Benjamin Brossier	3–0	Tobias Rasmussen
Tristan Flore	3–0	Claus Nielsen
Quentin Robinot	3–1	Mikkel Hindersson

2 March 2016; 13:00	Report	England	3–0	Malaysia
Score by game:
Paul Drinkhall	3–0	Muhamad Haiqal
Liam Pitchford	3–1	Leong Chee Feng
Sam Walker	3–1	Muhd Ibrahim

==== Group C ====
Team	Pld	W	L	GW	GL	Pts
Japan	5	5	0	15	2	10
Poland	5	3	2	11	9	8
Portugal	5	3	2	11	7	8
Ukraine	5	3	2	10	9	8
Belarus	5	1	4	3	12	6
Singapore	5	0	5	4	15	5

28 February 2016; 16:30	Report	Japan	3–0	Belarus
Score by game:
Jun Mizutani	3–0	Pavel Platonov
Yuya Oshima	3–0	Aliaksandr Khanin
Koki Niwa	3–0	Kiryl Barbanov

28 February 2016; 16:30	Report	Portugal	3–1	Ukraine
Score by game:
Marcos Freitas	3–1	Kou Lei
João Monteiro	0–3	Yaroslav Zhmudenko
Tiago Apolónia	3–1	Yevhen Pryshchepa
Marcos Freitas	3–0	Yaroslav Zhmudenko

28 February 2016; 16:30	Report	Poland	3–2	Singapore
Score by game:
Jakub Dyjas	3–2	Gao Ning
Wang Zengyi	1–3	Yang Zi
Daniek Górak	3–1	Clarence Chew
Wang Zengyi	2–3	Gao Ning
Jakub Dyias	3–1	Yang Zi
–

29 February 2016; 10:00	Report	Japan	3–1	Singapore
Score by game:
Koki Niwa	2–3	Pang Xue Jie
Yuya Oshima	3–2	Yang Zi
Maharu Yoshimura	3–2	Clarence Chew
Koki Niwa	3–2	Yang Zi

29 February 2016; 10:00	Report	Portugal	3–0	Belarus
Score by game:
Marcos Freitas	3–2	Aliaksandr Khanin
João Monteiro	3–1	Pavel Platonov
Tiago Apolónia	3–0	Gleb Shamruk

29 February 2016; 10:00	Report	Poland	2–3	Ukraine
Score by game:
Daniek Górak	1–3	Yaroslav Zhmudenko
Jakub Dyjas	3–1	Kou Lei
Wang Zengyi	2–3	Yevhen Pryshchepa
Daniek Górak	3–2	Kou Lei
Jakub Dyjas	1–3	Yaroslav Zhmudenko
–

29 February 2016; 19:30	Report	Japan	3–0	Poland
Score by game:
Yuya Oshima	3–0	Jakub Dyjas
Jun Mizutani	3–0	Patryk Zatówka
Koki Niwa	3–2	Daniek Górak

29 February 2016; 19:30	Report	Portugal	3–0	Singapore
Score by game:
Marcos Freitas	3–0	Pang Xue Jie
Tiago Apolónia	3–0	Clarence Chew
João Monteiro	3–0	Poh Chao

29 February 2016; 19:30	Report	Belarus	0–3	Ukraine
Score by game:
Pavel Platonov	1–3	Yaroslav Zhmudenko
Vladimir Samsonov	0–3	Kou Lei
Aliaksandr Khanin	2–3	Yevhen Pryshchepa

1 March 2016; 19:30	Report	Japan	3–0	Ukraine
Score by game:
Jun Mizutani	3–0	Kou Lei
Maharu Yoshimura	3–0	Yevhen Pryshchepa
Kenta Matsudaira	3–0	Viktor Yefimov

1 March 2016; 19:30	Report	Portugal	1–3	Poland
Score by game:
Marcos Freitas	0–3	Wang Zengyi
Tiago Apolónia	3–1	Jakub Dyjas
João Monteiro	1–3	Daniek Górak
Marcos Freitas	2–3	Jakub Dyjas

1 March 2016; 19:30	Report	Belarus	3–2	Singapore
Score by game:
Aliaksandr Khanin	3–0	Yang Zi
Pavel Platonov	3–2	Pang Xue Jie
Gleb Shamruk	3–2	Clarence Chew

2 March 2016; 16:30	Report	Japan	3–1	Portugal
Score by game:
Maharu Yoshimura	3–1	Tiago Apolónia
Jun Mizutani	2–3	João Monteiro
Koki Niwa	3–0	Marcos Freitas
Jun Mizutani	3–1	Tiago Apolónia

2 March 2016; 16:30	Report	Poland	3–0	Belarus
Score by game:
Wang Zengyi	3–0	Aliaksandr Khanin
Jakub Dyjas	3–0	Pavel Platonov
Daniek Górak	3–1	Gleb Shamruk

2 March 2016; 16:30	Report	Ukraine	3–1	Singapore
Score by game:
Kou Lei	3–0	Pang Xue Jie
Yaroslav Zhmudenko	2–3	Clarence Chew
Yevhen Pryshchepa	3–1	Shao Poh
Kou Lei	3–2	Clarence Chew

==== Group D ====
Team	Pld	W	L	GW	GL	Pts
South Korea	5	5	0	15	5	10
Hong Kong	5	3	2	12	6	8
Croatia	5	3	2	11	9	8
Russia	5	2	3	9	12	7
Romania	5	1	4	7	14	6
Italy	5	1	4	5	13	6

28 February 2016; 16:30	Report	South Korea	3–2	Croatia
Score by game:
Jung Young-sik	1–3	Andrej Gaćina
Lee Sang-su	3–1	Tan Ruiwu
Joo Sae-hyuk	0–3	Zoran Primorac
Lee Sang-su	3–2	Andrej Gaćina
Jung Young-sik	3–1	Tan Ruiwu
–

28 February 2016; 16:30	Report	Hong Kong	3–0	Romania
Score by game:
Wong Chun Ting	3–2	Adrian Crișan
Tang Peng	3–1	Ovidiu Ionescu
Ho Kwan Kit	3–0	Constantin Cioti

28 February 2016; 16:30	Report	Russia	1–3	Italy
Score by game:
Mikhail Paikov	1–3	Mihai Bobocica
Kirill Skachkov	2–3	Niagol Stoyanov
Grigory Vlasov	3–2	Leonardo Mutti
Kirill Skachkov	2–3	Mihai Bobocica

29 February 2016; 13:00	Report	South Korea	3–0	Italy
Score by game:
Jung Young-sik	3–2	Mihai Bobocica
Lee Sang-su	3–1	Niagol Stoyanov
Jeong Sang-eun	3–0	Leonardo Mutti

29 February 2016; 13:00	Report	Hong Kong	3–0	Croatia
Score by game:
Tang Peng	3–0	Andrej Gaćina
Wong Chun Ting	3–1	Frane Kojić
Ho Kwan Kit	3–2	Tomislav Pucar

29 February 2016; 13:00	Report	Russia	3–1	Romania
Score by game:
Alexander Shibaev	3–2	Adrian Crișan
Mikhail Paikov	3–0	Ovidiu Ionescu
Grigory Vlasov	2–3	Constantin Cioti
Alexander Shibaev	3–2	Ovidiu Ionescu

29 February 2016; 19:30	Report	South Korea	3–0	Russia
Score by game:
Lee Sang-su	3–0	Alexander Shibaev
Jung Young-sik	3–0	Grigory Vlasov
Joo Sae-hyuk	3–1	Mikhail Paikov

29 February 2016; 19:30	Report	Hong Kong	3–0	Italy
Score by game:
Wong Chun Ting	3–0	Niagol Stoyanov
Tang Peng	3–1	Mihai Bobocica
Ho Kwan Kit	3–0	Leonardo Mutti

29 February 2016; 19:30	Report	Croatia	3–1	Romania
Score by game:
Andrej Gaćina	3–1	Ovidiu Ionescu
Frane Kojić	0–3	Hunor Szőcs
Zoran Primorac	3–1	Andrei Filimon
Andrej Gaćina	3–1	Hunor Szőcs

1 March 2016; 13:00	Report	South Korea	3–2	Romania
Score by game:
Jung Young-sik	3–1	Hunor Szőcs
Lee Sang-su	1–3	Ovidiu Ionescu
Jang Woo-jin	3–1	Constantin Cioti
Jung Young-sik	1–3	Ovidiu Ionescu
Lee Sang-su	3–2	Hunor Szőcs
–

1 March 2016; 13:00	Report	Hong Kong	2–3	Russia
Score by game:
Wong Chun Ting	3–1	Grigory Vlasov
Tang Peng	1–3	Alexander Shibaev
Ho Kwan Kit	2–3	Kirill Skachkov
Wong Chun Ting	3–0	Alexander Shibaev
Tang Peng	2–3	Grigory Vlasov
–

1 March 2016; 13:00	Report	Croatia	3–0	Italy
Score by game:
Tomislav Pucar	3–1	Mihai Bobocica
Andrej Gaćina	3–1	Niagol Stoyanov
Zoran Primorac	3–2	Marco Rech Daldosso

2 March 2016; 10:00	Report	South Korea	3–1	Hong Kong
Score by game:
Lee Sang-su	1–3	Wong Chun Ting
Joo Sae-hyuk	3–0	Ho Kwan Kit
Jung Young-sik	3–2	Tang Peng
Joo Sae-hyuk	3–2	Wong Chun Ting

2 March 2016; 10:00	Report	Russia	2–3	Croatia
Score by game:
Alexander Shibaev	2–3	Andrej Gaćina
Kirill Skachkov	1–3	Tomislav Pucar
Mikhail Paikov	3–0	Zoran Primorac
Alexander Shibaev	3–2	Tomislav Pucar
Kirill Skachkov	0–3	Andrej Gaćina
–

2 March 2016; 10:00	Report	Romania	3–2	Italy
Score by game:
Hunor Szőcs	2–3	Marco Rech Daldosso
Ovidiu Ionescu	3–0	Niagol Stoyanov
Constantin Cioti	0–3	Leonardo Mutti
Hunor Szőcs	3–1	Niagol Stoyanov
Ovidiu Ionescu	3–1	Marco Rech Daldosso
–

=== Knockout stage ===
The group winners of Groupd C and D were drawn, as well as the second and third placed teams. Same for the fourth, fifth and sixth placed teams.

==== Places 13–24 ====
Round of 16
Malaysia	0
Chinese Taipei	3
Belarus	0
Italy	3
Singapore	1
Denmark	3
Romania	3
Greece	2

Quarterfinals
Ukraine	3
Chinese Taipei	2
Italy	1
Germany	3
Russia	3
Denmark	2
Romania	0
Czech Republic	3

Semifinals
Ukraine	0
Germany	3
Russia	1
Czech Republic	3

Final

==== Places 1–12 ====
Round of 16
Croatia	0
Sweden	3
North Korea	0
Portugal	3
Austria	1
Hong Kong	3
Poland	2
England	3

Quarterfinals
China	3
Sweden	0
Portugal	1
South Korea	3
Japan	3
Hong Kong	1
England	3
France	2

Semifinals
China	3
South Korea	0
Japan	3
England	1

Final
China	3
Japan	0

===== Round of 16 =====
3 March 2016; 13:00	Report	North Korea	0–3	Portugal
Score by game:
Pak Sin-hyok	2–3	João Monteiro
Choe II	2–3	Marcos Freitas
Kang Wi-hun	0–3	Tiago Apolónia

3 March 2016; 13:00	Report	Poland	2–3	England
Score by game:
Wang Zengyi	1–3	Paul Drinkhall
Jakub Dyjas	2–3	Liam Pitchford
Daniek Górak	3–2	Sam Walker
Wang Zengyi	3–1	Liam Pitchford
Jakub Dyjas	1–3	Paul Drinkhall
–

3 March 2016; 16:30	Report	Croatia	0–3	Sweden
Score by game:
Tomislav Pucar	1–3	Mattias Karlsson
Andrej Gaćina	0–3	Kristian Karlsson
Zoran Primorac	1–3	Jon Persson

3 March 2016; 16:30	Report	Austria	1–3	Hong Kong
Score by game:
Stefan Fegerl	1–3	Tang Peng
Robert Gardos	1–3	Wong Chun Ting
Werner Schlager	3–2	Ho Kwan Kit
Stefan Fegerl	0–3	Wong Chun Ting

===== Quarterfinals =====
4 March 2016; 13:00	Report	Portugal	1–3	South Korea
Score by game:
João Monteiro	1–3	Lee Sang-su
Marcos Freitas	1–3	Joo Sae-hyuk
Tiago Apolónia	3–1	Jung Young-sik
João Monteiro	2–3	Joo Sae-hyuk

4 March 2016; 16:30	Report	China	3–0	Sweden
Score by game:
Ma Long	3–0	Mattias Karlsson
Fan Zhendong	3–0	Kristian Karlsson
Xu Xin	3–0	Jon Persson

4 March 2016; 16:30	Report	Japan	3–1	Hong Kong
Score by game:
Jun Mizutani	3–1	Ho Kwan Kit
Yoshimura Maharu	3–2	Wong Chun Ting
Niwa Koki	0–3	Tang Peng
Jun Mizutani	3–2	Wong Chun Ting

4 March 2016; 19:30	Report	England	3–2	France
Score by game:
Paul Drinkhall	0–3	Simon Gauzy
Liam Pitchford	3–0	Emmanuel Lebesson
Sam Walker	1–3	Tristan Flore
Liam Pitchford	3–1	Simon Gauzy
Paul Drinkhall	3–2	Emmanuel Lebesson
–

===== Semifinals =====
5 March 2016; 13:00	Report	China	3–0	South Korea
Score by game:
Xu Xin	3–1	Lee Sang-su
Ma Long	3–0	Jung Young-sik
Zhang Jike	3–1	Jang Woo-jin

5 March 2016; 19:30	Report	Japan	3–1	England
Score by game:
Jun Mizutani	3–0	Paul Drinkhall
Maharu Yoshimura	3–2	Liam Pitchford
Yuya Oshima	1–3	Sam Walker
Jun Mizutani	3–2	Liam Pitchford

===== Final =====
6 March 2016; 19:30	Report	China	3–0	Japan
Score by game:
Xu Xin	3–0	Jun Mizutani
Ma Long	3–0	Maharu Yoshimura
Zhang Jike	3–1	Yuya Oshima

== Division 2 ==
=== Preliminary round ===
==== Group E ====
Team	Pld	W	L	GW	GL	Pts
Brazil	5	5	0	15	4	10
Belgium	5	4	1	12	5	9
Iran	5	3	2	13	8	8
Netherlands	5	2	3	7	11	7
Thailand	5	1	4	6	13	6
Canada	5	0	5	3	15	5

	BRA	IRN	BEL	NED	THA	CAN
Brazil		3–2	3–0	3–1	3–1	3–0
Iran	—		2–3	3–0	3–2	3–0
Belgium	—	—		3–0	3–0	3–0
Netherlands	—	—	—		3–0	3–2
Thailand	—	—	—	—		3–1
Canada	—	—	—	—	—	

==== Group F ====
Team	Pld	W	L	GW	GL	Pts
Nigeria	5	5	0	15	1	10
India	5	4	1	12	3	9
Slovakia	5	2	3	8	10	7
Vietnam	5	2	3	6	11	6
Switzerland	5	1	4	5	13	6
Turkey	5	1	4	5	13	6

	IND	SVK	NGA	VIE	SUI	TUR
India		3–0	0–3	3–0	3–0	3–0
Slovakia	—		1–3	3–0	3–1	1–3
Nigeria	—	—		3–0	3–0	3–0
Vietnam	—	—	—		3–1	3–1
Switzerland	—	—	—	—		3–1
Turkey	—	—	—	—	—	

==== Group G ====
Team	Pld	W	L	GW	GL	Pts
Egypt	5	5	0	15	3	10
Argentina	5	4	1	12	6	9
Hungary	5	3	2	11	8	8
Slovenia	5	2	3	10	9	7
Mexico	5	1	4	5	13	6
Norway	5	0	5	1	15	5

	HUN	EGY	SVN	ARG	MEX	NOR
Hungary		1–3	3–1	1–3	3–1	3–0
Egypt	—		3–2	3–0	3–0	3–0
Slovenia	—	—		1–3	3–0	3–0
Argentina	—	—	—		3–1	3–0
Mexico	—	—	—	—		3–1
Norway	—	—	—	—	—	

==== Group H ====
Team	Pld	W	L	GW	GL	Pts
Spain	5	5	0	15	3	10
Serbia	5	4	1	14	7	9
Puerto Rico	5	3	2	11	10	8
Bulgaria	5	2	3	11	10	7
Australia	5	1	4	5	13	6
Latvia	5	0	5	2	15	5

	ESP	SRB	BUL	AUS	LAT	PUR
Spain		3–2	3–1	3–0	3–0	3–0
Serbia	—		3–2	3–0	3–0	3–2
Bulgaria	—	—		3–1	3–0	2–3
Australia	—	—	—		3–1	1–3
Latvia	—	—	—	—		1–3
Puerto Rico	—	—	—	—	—	

=== Knockout stage ===
The group winners, as well as the second and third placed teams were drawn. Same for the fourth, fifth and sixth placed teams.

==== Places 37–48 ====
Round of 16
Turkey	1
Thailand	3
Australia	3
Norway	1
Canada	3
Mexico	1
Switzerland	3
Latvia	1

Quarterfinals
Vietnam	1
Thailand	3
Australia	1
Slovenia	3
Netherlands	1
Canada	3
Switzerland	1
Bulgaria	3

Semifinals
Thailand	2
Slovenia	3
Canada	2
Bulgaria	3

Final

==== Places 25–36 ====
Round of 16
Slovakia	2
Belgium	3
Serbia	3
Iran	2
Puerto Rico	3
Argentina	2
India	3
Hungary	1

Quarterfinals
Brazil	3
Belgium	1
Serbia	3
Spain	0
Egypt	3
Puerto Rico	0
India	3
Nigeria	2

Semifinals
Brazil	3
Serbia	1
Egypt	1
India	3

25th place
Brazil	2
India	3

== Division 3 ==
=== Preliminary round ===
==== Group I ====
Team	Pld	W	L	GW	GL	Pts
Lithuania	5	5	0	15	2	10
Kazakhstan	5	4	1	13	5	9
Finland	5	3	2	11	10	8
Venezuela	5	2	3	9	11	7
New Zealand	5	1	4	6	14	6
Mongolia	5	0	5	3	15	5

	LTU	KAZ	FIN	MGL	VEN	NZL
Lithuania		3–1	3–1	3–0	3–0	3–0
Kazakhstan	—		3–1	3–0	3–1	3–0
Finland	—	—		3–1	3–2	3–1
Mongolia	—	—	—		0–3	2–3
Venezuela	—	—	—	—		3–2
New Zealand	—	—	—	—	—	

==== Group J ====
Team	Pld	W	L	GW	GL	Pts
Luxembourg	5	5	0	15	1	10
United States	5	4	1	12	6	9
Scotland	5	3	2	11	7	8
Algeria	5	2	3	8	9	7
Guatemala	5	1	4	4	12	6
Cyprus	5	0	5	0	15	5

	USA	SCO	ALG	LUX	GUA	CYP
United States		3–2	3–0	0–3	3–1	3–0
Scotland	—		3–1	0–3	3–0	3–0
Algeria	—	—		1–3	3–0	3–0
Luxembourg	—	—	—		3–0	3–0
Guatemala	—	—	—	—		3–0
Cyprus	—	—	—	—	—	

==== Group K ====
Team	Pld	W	L	GW	GL	Pts
Saudi Arabia	5	5	0	15	3	10
Chile	5	4	1	13	5	9
Uzbekistan	5	3	2	13	10	7
Philippines	5	2	3	8	11	7
Paraguay	5	1	4	6	13	6
Yemen	5	0	5	2	15	5

	CHI	KSA	PHI	PAR	UZB	YEM
Chile		1–3	3–0	3–0	3–2	3–0
Saudi Arabia	—		3–0	3–0	3–2	3–0
Philippines	—	—		3–2	2–3	3–0
Paraguay	—	—	—		1–3	3–1
Uzbekistan	—	—	—	—		3–1
Yemen	—	—	—	—	—	

==== Group L ====
Team	Pld	W	L	GW	GL	Pts
Indonesia	5	5	0	15	0	10
Ireland	5	3	2	11	10	8
Republic of the Congo	5	3	2	10	9	8
Estonia	5	3	2	10	8	8
Lebanon	5	1	4	5	14	6
Sri Lanka	5	0	5	5	15	5

	CGO	INA	LIB	EST	IRL	SRI
Republic of the Congo		0–3	3–0	3–1	1–3	3–2
Indonesia	—		3–0	3–0	3–0	3–0
Lebanon	—	—		0–3	0–3	3–2
Estonia	—	—	—		3–2	3–0
Ireland	—	—	—	—		3–1
Sri Lanka	—	—	—	—	—	

=== Knockout stage ===
The group winners, the second and third placed teams were drawn. Same for the fourth, fifth and sixth placed teams.

==== Places 61–72 ====
Round of 16
Sri Lanka	3
Paraguay	2
Guatemala	0
Mongolia	3
Yemen	3
New Zealand	1
Lebanon	3
Cyprus	1

Quarterfinals
Venezuela	3
Sri Lanka	1
Mongolia	0
Estonia	3
Algeria	3
Yemen	1
Lebanon	3
Philippines	2

Semifinals
Venezuela	3
Estonia	2
Algeria	3
Lebanon	1

Final

69th place bracket

Semifinals
Paraguay	2
Guatemala	3
New Zealand	1
Cyprus	3

Final

==== Places 49–60 ====
Round of 16
Republic of the Congo	1
United States	3
Chile	3
Scotland	1
Finland	3
Ireland	1
Kazakhstan	3
Uzbekistan	2

Quarterfinals
Lithuania	2
United States	3
Chile	3
Indonesia	2
Saudi Arabia	3
Finland	2
Kazakhstan	2
Luxembourg	3

Semifinals
United States	1
Chile	3
Saudi Arabia	1
Luxembourg	3

49th place
Chile	2
Luxembourg	3

57th place bracket

Semifinals
Republic of the Congo	2
Scotland	3
Ireland	3
Uzbekistan	2

Final

== Division 4 ==
=== Preliminary round ===
==== Group M ====
Team	Pld	W	L	GW	GL	Pts
Pakistan	3	3	0	9	2	6
Panama	3	2	1	6	5	4
Turkmenistan	3	1	2	5	7	4
Maldives	3	0	3	3	9	3

	PAK	TKM	PAN	MDV
Pakistan		3–1	3–0	3–1
Turkmenistan	—		1–3	3–1
Panama	—	—		3–1
Maldives	—	—	—	

==== Group N ====
Team	Pld	W	L	GW	GL	Pts
Togo	3	3	0	9	3	6
United Arab Emirates	3	2	1	7	6	5
Mauritius	3	1	2	5	6	4
Kosovo	3	0	3	3	9	3

	MRI	TOG	KOS	UAE
Mauritius		0–3	3–1	2–3
Togo	—		3–1	3–1
Kosovo	—	—		2–3
United Arab Emirates	—	—	—	

==== Group O ====
Team	Pld	W	L	GW	GL	Pts
Macau	3	3	0	9	1	6
Tunisia	3	2	1	7	5	5
Malta	3	1	2	3	7	4
Libya	3	0	3	3	9	3

	TUN	MAC	MLT	LBA
Tunisia		1–3	3–0	3–2
Macau	—		3–0	3–0
Malta	—	—		3–1
Libya	—	—	—	

==== Group P ====
Team	Pld	W	L	GW	GL	Pts
Jamaica	4	4	0	12	0	8
Laos	4	3	1	9	5	7
Morocco	4	2	2	8	6	6
DR Congo	3	0	3	0	9	3
Ghana	3	0	3	0	9	3

	JAM	GHA	LAO	MAR	DRC
Jamaica		3–0	3–0	0–3	3–0
Ghana	—		0–3	0–3	NP
Laos	—	—		3–2	3–0
Morocco	—	—	—		3–0
DR Congo	—	—	—	—	

=== Knockout stage ===
==== Places 73–80 ====
Quarterfinals
Pakistan	3
Tunisia	0
United Arab Emirates	0
Jamaica	3
Macau	2
Panama	3
Laos	2
Togo	3

Semifinals
Pakistan	3
Jamaica	0
Panama	1
Togo	3

73rd place
Pakistan	3
Togo	2
75th place
Jamaica	3
Panama	1

77th place bracket

Semifinals
Tunisia	3
United Arab Emirates	0
Macau	3
Laos	0

77th place
Tunisia	3
Macau	1
79th place
United Arab Emirates	3
Laos	2

==== Places 81–88 ====
Quarterfinals
Malta	1
Maldives	3
Kosovo	3
Morocco	2
Mauritius	3
Libya	2

Semifinals
Maldives	2
Kosovo	3
Mauritius	3
Turkmenistan	2

81st place
Kosovo	2
Mauritius	3
83rd place
Maldives	3
Turkmenistan	1

85th place bracket

Semifinals
Malta	3
Morocco	0

85th place
Libya	0
Malta	3
