= Table tennis at the 2015 European Games – Men's singles =

Men's singles at the 2015 European Games
- Venue: Baku Crystal Hall
- Date: 16–19 June
- Competitors: 47 from 27 nations

Medalists
gold medal	Dimitrij Ovtcharov	Germany
silver medal	Vladimir Samsonov	Belarus
bronze medal	Kou Lei	Ukraine

The men's singles in table tennis at the 2015 European Games in Baku was the 1st edition of the event in a European Games. It was at the Baku Crystal Hall from 16 to 19 June 2015.

== Seeds ==
Seeds were based on the ITTF World Ranking lists published in June 2015.

1. Dimitrij Ovtcharov (GER)
2. Timo Boll (GER)
3. Vladimir Samsonov (BLR)
4. Marcos Freitas (POR)
5. Panagiotis Gionis (GRE)
6. Tiago Apolónia (POR)
7. Robert Gardos (AUT)
8. Andrej Gaćina (CRO)
9. Simon Gauzy (FRA)
10. Adrien Mattenet (FRA)
11. Alexander Shibaev (RUS)
12. Stefan Fegerl (AUT)
13. Liam Pitchford (GBR)
14. Kristian Karlsson (SWE)
15. Adrian Crișan (ROU)
16. Paul Drinkhall (GBR)

== Schedule ==
All times are Azerbaijan Summer Time (UTC+5)

Date	Time	Event
Tuesday, 16 June 2015	16:00	First Round
Thursday, 17 June 2015	17:30	Second Round
Friday, 18 June 2015	14:00	Third Round
Friday, 18 June 2015	19:30	Quarterfinals
Saturday, 19 June 2015	14:00	Semifinals
Saturday, 19 June 2015	20:00	Final

== Draw ==
=== Finals ===
Semifinals
1	D Ovtcharov (GER)	2	11	6	11	11	11
16	P Drinkhall (GBR)	11	4	11	6	7	3
3	V Samsonov (BLR)	10	12	11	11	11
L Kou (UKR)	12	10	4	8	4

Gold medal match
1	D Ovtcharov (GER)	10	7	11	11	9	11	11
3	V Samsonov (BLR)	12	11	9	3	11	7	8
Bronze medal match
16	P Drinkhall (GBR)	11	7	7	5	11	20
L Kou (UKR)	5	11	11	11	5	22

=== Top half ===
==== Section 1 ====
First Round
Z Wang (POL)	11	11	11	11
R Jafarov (AZE)	6	5	9	5
K Kreanga (GRE)	13	8	11	10	7	11	11
C Nuytinck (BEL)	11	11	7	12	11	5	6
N Stoyanov (ITA)	11	11	12	10	12	11
C Machado (ESP)	4	8	10	12	14	7

Second Round
1	D Ovtcharov (GER)	14	11	11	11
D Prokopcov (CZE)	12	6	9	6
10	A Mattenet (FRA)	7	12	9	11	8	11	11
Z Wang (POL)	11	10	11	9	11	6	9
15	A Crișan (ROU)	9	11	10	8	11	5
K Kreanga (GRE)	11	8	12	11	8	11
8	A Gaćina (CRO)	11	13	11	11
N Stoyanov (ITA)	1	11	6	4

Third Round
1	D Ovtcharov (GER)	11	11	11	11
10	A Mattenet (FRA)	3	4	8	4
K Kreanga (GRE)	6	9	11	11	11	3	5
8	A Gaćina (CRO)	11	11	6	8	9	11	11

Quarterfinals
1	D Ovtcharov (GER)	11	11	12	11
8	A Gaćina (CRO)	5	5	10	4

==== Section 2 ====
First Round
B Tokič (SLO)	11	11	11	11
I Katkov (UKR)	5	3	3	7
Á Pattantyús (HUN)	11	11	11	11
M Burģis (LAT)	8	9	4	6
P Gerell (SWE)	9	11	11	11	15
P Platonov (BLR)	11	8	4	4	13
A Li (TUR)	11	5	7	6
L Pištej (SVK)	13	11	11	11

Second Round
7	R Gardos (AUT)	6	13	6	7	10
B Tokič (SLO)	11	11	11	11	12
16	P Drinkhall (GBR)	9	11	9	11	11	11
Á Pattantyús (HUN)	11	5	11	9	6	8
11	A Shibaev (RUS)	9	11	11	8	11	7	9
P Gerell (SWE)	11	9	7	11	8	11	11
4	M Freitas (POR)	11	11	11	11
L Pištej (SVK)	7	3	8	4

Third Round
B Tokič (SLO)	11	10	11	5	9	3
16	P Drinkhall (GBR)	6	12	8	11	11	11
P Gerell (SWE)	11	11	8	7	6	8
4	M Freitas (POR)	5	6	11	11	11	11

Quarterfinals
16	P Drinkhall (GBR)	11	11	3	11	11
4	M Freitas (POR)	6	6	11	6	9

=== Bottom half ===
==== Section 3 ====
First Round
M Bobocica (ITA)	11	11	11	11
F Ismayilov (AZE)	5	5	8	9
T Konečný (CZE)	7	14	8	11	5	11	6
D Kosiba (HUN)	11	12	11	5	11	7	11
K Skachkov (RUS)	9	12	9	8	5
J-M Saive (BEL)	11	10	11	11	11
J Groth (DEN)	11	8	11	7	11	9
M Durán (ESP)	13	11	6	11	2	11

Second Round
3	V Samsonov (BLR)	11	11	11	11	11
M Bobocica (ITA)	13	5	4	5	7
9	S Gauzy (FRA)	11	10	6	11	11	11
D Kosiba (HUN)	8	12	11	5	9	4
14	K Karlsson (SWE)	11	11	11	9	11
J-M Saive (BEL)	4	7	4	11	6
6	T Apolónia (POR)	11	11	11	12	7	11
M Durán (ESP)	6	6	6	14	11	5

Third Round
3	V Samsonov (BLR)	11	4	9	11	13	11
9	S Gauzy (FRA)	4	11	11	2	11	9
14	K Karlsson (SWE)	6	6	9	11	11	8
6	T Apolónia (POR)	11	11	11	3	6	11

Quarterfinals
3	V Samsonov (BLR)	11	11	11	11
6	T Apolónia (POR)	9	6	3	7

==== Section 4 ====
First Round
L Kou (UKR)	9	11	11	11	11
C Cioti (ROU)	11	8	5	9	8
D Górak (POL)	11	11	9	11	10	16
B Olah (FIN)	7	8	11	9	12	14
R Tan (CRO)	11	10	13	9	11	1	6
A Duránspahić (BIH)	9	12	11	11	3	11	11
Y Wang (SVK)	11	7	10	11	9	11	11
A Karakašević (SRB)	5	11	12	6	11	5	8

Second Round
5	P Gionis (GRE)	6	11	11	7	11	10
L Kou (UKR)	11	4	7	11	13	12
12	S Fegerl (AUT)	8	11	8	7	11	11	11
D Górak (POL)	11	8	11	11	4	7	3
13	L Pitchford (GBR)	9	5	11	12	11	11
A Duránspahić (BIH)	11	11	8	10	7	8
2	~~T Boll (GER)~~
Y Wang (SVK) w/o

Third Round
L Kou (UKR)	11	5	11	14	11
12	S Fegerl (AUT)	7	11	9	12	9
13	L Pitchford (GBR)	11	11	11	6	5	14
Y Wang (SVK)	6	4	5	11	11	12

Quarterfinals
L Kou (UKR)	11	11	11	9	11
13	L Pitchford (GBR)	8	6	6	11	8
