= Niall Cameron =

Scottish table tennis player

Niall Cameron (born 1979) is a Scottish table tennis player from Elgin, Scotland.

He is currently ranked number 3 in Scotland.

== Career ==
He represented Scotland in the 2002 Commonwealth Games in Manchester and the 2014 Commonwealth Games in Glasgow.

- 4x Scottish Men's Doubles Champion
- 2x Scottish Mixed Doubles Champion
- Commonwealth Championships Team Bronze (2013)
- British Premier League Winner (2011)

Niall has competed at four World Championships and six European Championships. Most recently, in 2019 where he faced Truls Moregard (Sweden)
