= Pongfinity =

Finnish sports comedy group

- Pongfinity's YouTube icon
- Industry: Entertainment
- Genre: Sports; entertainment; comedy; trick shots
- Predecessor: EditingSports
- Founded: 6 December 2012 (first channel created); 13 November 2015 (current channel created)
- Founders: Emil Rantatulkkila; Otto Tennilä; Miikka O'Connor
- Headquarters: Helsinki, Finland

YouTube information
- Channel: Pongfinity
- Years active: 2016–present
- Subscribers: 4.63 million
- Views: 1.13 billion
- Last updated: 2 July 2025
- Website: www.pongfinity.fi

Pongfinity is a Finnish sports and comedy group focused around table tennis composed of Emil Rantatulkkila, Otto Tennilä, and Miikka O'Connor. Their YouTube channel, which mainly displays trick shots related to the sport, is the 7th most-subscribed channel in Finland and the most-subscribed channel about table tennis. Both Otto and Miikka are semi-professional players, earning medals in Finnish, Swedish, and Estonian championships.

== History ==
Before forming Pongfinity, Emil, Otto, and Miikka all competed in international table tennis competitions. All three became friends when they were on the Finnish junior national team, but Emil did not end up chasing a professional career. However, Otto and Miikka did and represented Finland during the European and World Table Tennis Championships several times. They did not win any medals during these tournaments. Miikka and Emil had previously met when they played in the same club as juniors.

The group uploaded their first video on 16 December 2012, on a channel called EditingSports. Emil had been interested in editing videos and wanted to try it out, so he and Miikka filmed a training session where they had fun doing random trick shots to edit. After it was uploaded, it became apparent that the videos gained more attention from the trick shots than the editing, so they made the channel more focused on those. Otto first appeared in the following video. Pongfinity's first viral video was one where they extinguished a candle with a ball.

=== Medal tables ===
Data adapted from Table Tennis Media. Emil does not have data on this site.

Otto Tennilä

Otto Tennilä
Medal record

Table tennis

National Championships
Bronze medal – third place	2008 Tampere	Mixed Doubles
Bronze medal – third place	2013 Tampere	Singles
Gold medal – first place	2013 Tampere	Doubles
Bronze medal – third place	2014 Seinäjoki	Singles
Gold medal – first place	2014 Seinäjoki	Doubles
Gold medal – first place	2016 Helsinki	Doubles
Gold medal – first place	2017 Kuopio	Doubles
Gold medal – first place	2018 Helsinki	Doubles
Silver medal – second place	2019 Tampere	Doubles
Silver medal – second place	2020 Tampere	Doubles
Bronze medal – third place	2021 Tampere	Singles
Bronze medal – third place	2021 Tampere	Doubles
Bronze medal – third place	2021 Tampere	Mixed Doubles
Bronze medal – third place	2022 Helsinki	Singles
Bronze medal – third place	2022 Helsinki	Mixed Doubles
Bronze medal – third place	2023 Helsinki	Mixed Doubles
Gold medal – first place	2023 Helsinki	Doubles
Bronze medal – third place	2023 Helsinki	Singles

Club Championships
Silver medal – second place	2007 Finland 1st	PT 75
Silver medal – second place	2010 Finland 1st	PT 75
Gold medal – first place	2011 Finland 1st	PT 75
Gold medal – first place	2012 Finland 1st	PT 75
Gold medal – first place	2013 Finland 1st	PT 75
Gold medal – first place	2015 Finland 1st	PT 75
Bronze medal – third place	2016 Finland 1st	PT 75
Gold medal – first place	2017 Finland 1st	PT 75
Silver medal – second place	2018 Finland 1st	PT 75
Silver medal – second place	2019 Finland 1st	PT 75
Bronze medal – third place	2022 Finland 1st	PT 75

Miikka O'Connor

Miikka O'Connor
Medal record

Table tennis

National Championships
Silver medal – second place	2014 Seinäjoki	Mixed Doubles
Bronze medal – third place	2015 Helsinki	Doubles
Bronze medal – third place	2016 Helsinki	Doubles
Gold medal – first place	2017 Kuopio	Doubles
Gold medal – first place	2018 Helsinki	Doubles
Bronze medal – third place	2018 Helsinki	Mixed Doubles
Bronze medal – third place	2019 Tampere	Singles
Silver medal – second place	2019 Tampere	Doubles
Bronze medal – third place	2019 Tampere	Mixed Doubles
Silver medal – second place	2020 Helsinki	Singles
Silver medal – second place	2020 Helsinki	Doubles
Bronze medal – third place	2020 Helsinki	Mixed Doubles
Bronze medal – third place	2021 Tampere	Doubles
Gold medal – first place	2022 Helsinki	Doubles

Club Championships
Silver medal – second place	2014 Norway 2nd	Fornebu BTK
Bronze medal – third place	2015 Finland 1st	Wega
Gold medal – first place	2017 Finland 1st	PT 75
Gold medal – first place	2017 Sweden 3rd	Norrtulls SK
Gold medal – first place	2018 Finland 1st	PT 75
Gold medal – first place	2018 Sweden 3rd	Norrtulls SK
Gold medal – first place	2019 Finland 1st	PT 75
Bronze medal – third place	2021 Estonia 1st	Maardu LTK
Bronze medal – third place	2022 Finland 1st	PT 75

== Content and brand ==
Pongfinity has been frequently compared to the American sports comedy group Dude Perfect. A major series on the channel is "Challenge Pongfinity," where viewers can comment challenges that the group will have to complete. The group has also collaborated with YouTubers such as Adam Bobrow and Zach King, and fellow table tennis players Benedek Oláh, Michael Maze, and Liu Guoliang. Pongfinity has also worked with athletes from other sports, in which they usually compete against table tennis by trying trick shots with variations based on the sport, or dedicating a video to that sport entirely. The group has done videos with Lassi Hurskainen, Kalle Koljonen, and Otto Virtanen. Other series include individual matches with the members against each other and "Stereotypes", in which the group displays exaggerated personalities and playing styles that people can have when playing table tennis in short skits.

In 2019, Pongfinity released a table tennis mobile game on iOS and Android through Linnama Entertainment. The game is endless and has random situations occurring at times in chosen locations. Pongfinity also operates an online store selling table tennis equipment.
