= Kou Lei =

Ukrainian table tennis player

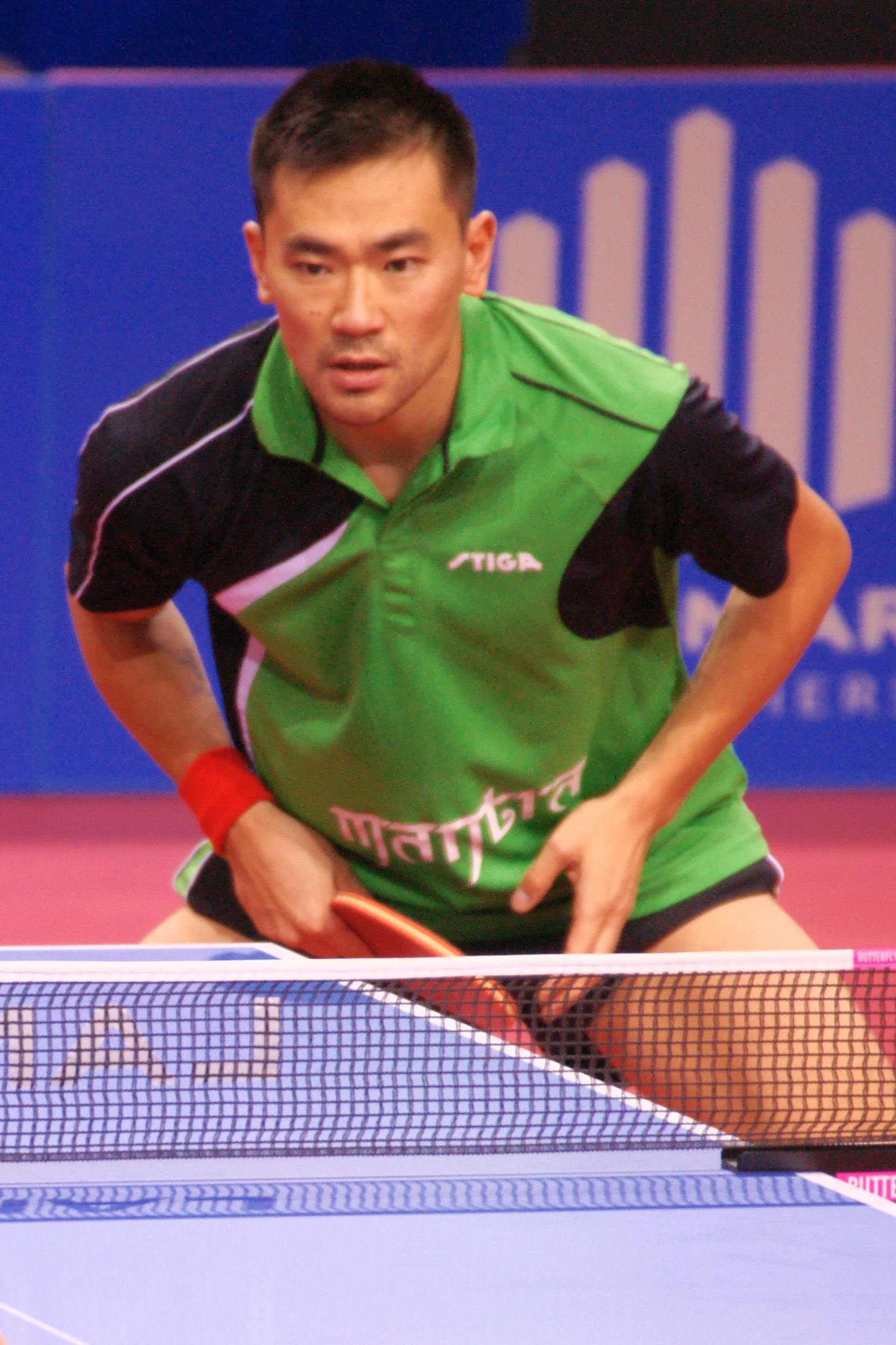
- Kou at the Top 16 Antibes, 2017

Personal information
- Nationality: Ukraine
- Born: 20 November 1987 (age 38) Beijing, China
- Height: 1.77 m (5 ft 9 1/2 in)
- Weight: 73 kg (161 lb)

Sport
- Sport: Table tennis
- Club: Nord
- Playing style: Right-handed, shakehand
- Highest ranking: 20 (April 2017)
- Current ranking: 54 (December 2020)
Medal record
Men's table tennis
Representing Ukraine
European Games
| Bronze medal – third place | 2015 Baku | Singles |
European Championships
| Bronze medal – third place | 2010 Ostrava | Doubles |

Kou Lei (Ukrainian: Коу Лей; born 20 November 1987 in Beijing) is a Ukrainian table tennis player of Chinese origin.

== Career ==
As of April 2017, Kou is ranked no. 20 in the world by the International Table Tennis Federation (ITTF). Kou is also right-handed, and uses the offensive, shakehand grip.

Major League Table Tennis

In 2023, Kou joined Major League Table Tennis (MLTT) as part of the league's inaugural season. He was signed to the Los Angeles Spinners, representing the team in the West Division.

During the 2025–26 season, Kou maintained a position as a primary singles player for the Spinners. In Week 5 of the season, he recorded two singles wins against Koki Niwa of the New York Slice. In March 2026, he competed in Week 13 fixtures in Hollywood, Florida, including a match against Seungmin Cho.

Throughout his tenure in the league, Kou has continued to compete in regional tournaments, winning the Men's Singles title at the 2026 USATT Pacific Regional Championships in February 2026.

Kou represented his adopted nation Ukraine at the 2008 Summer Olympics in Beijing, where he competed in the men's singles. He lost the preliminary round match to Congo's Suraju Saka, with a set score of 1–4. He reached the last sixteen in 2016 Rio Olympics, and round of 64 in 2020 Tokyo Olympics. He won a bronze medal at the 2015 European Games.
