= Hunor Szőcs =

Romanian table tennis player

Personal information
- Full name: Hunor János Szőcs
- Born: 24 March 1992 (age 34) Târgu Mureș, Romania
- Height: 1.75 m (5 ft 9 in)

Sport
- Sport: Table tennis
- Playing style: Attack
- Highest ranking: 62 (March 2018)

Hunor János Szőcs (born 24 March 1992 in Târgu Mureș) is a Romanian professional table tennis player.

He started playing Table Tennis in Târgu-Mureș, until he was 14 years old, at which point he was transferred to Csm-Lps Bistrița, where he was a part of Olympic Center which was designed to train the boys national team. He became singles champion of Romania in 2012.

Szőcs has a younger sister, Bernadette, who is also a national Romanian table tennis player. They are of Hungarian descent.
