= Mihai Bobocica =

Italian table tennis player (born 1986)

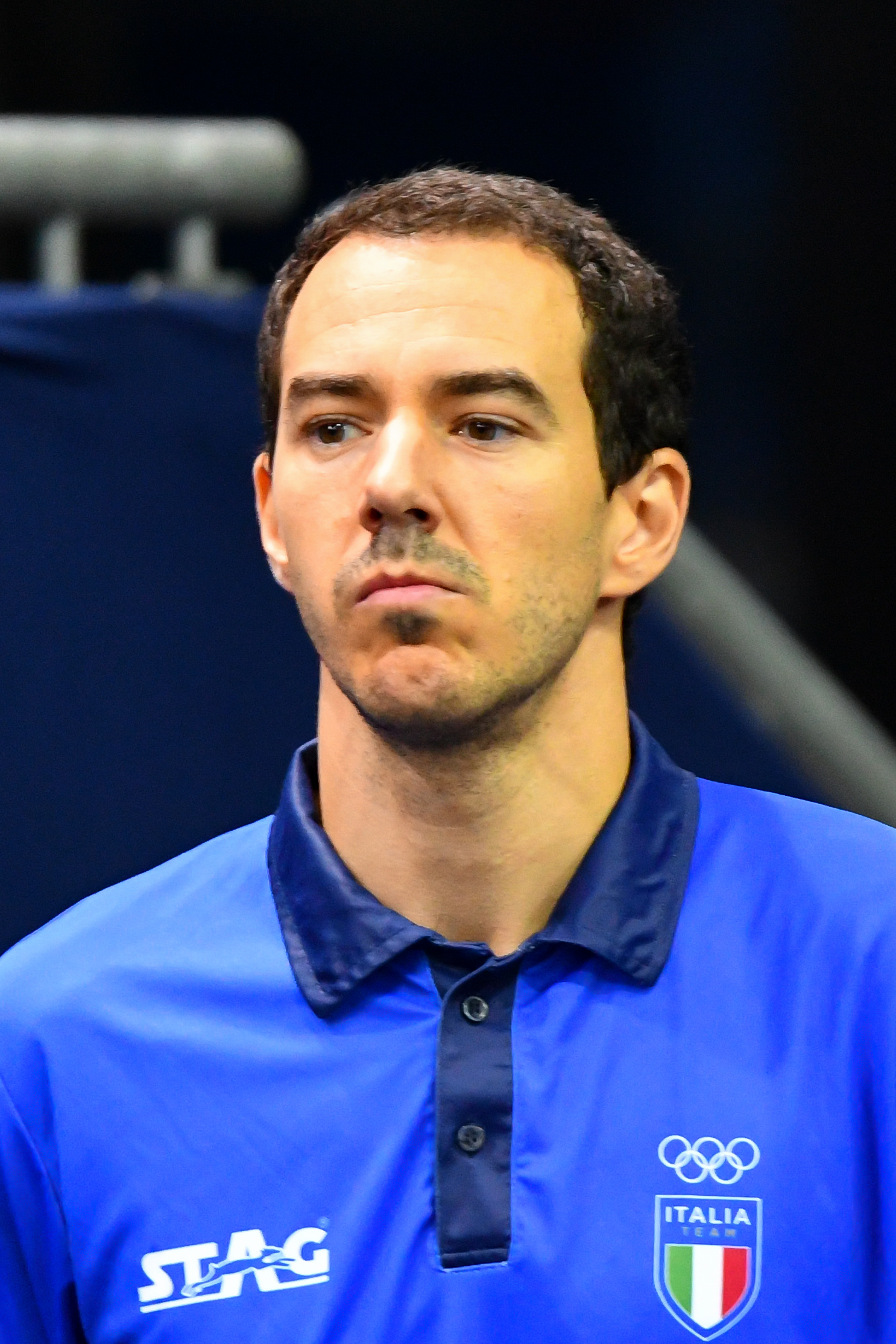

Personal information
- Full name: Mihai Razvan Bobocica
- Born: 8 September 1986 (age 39) Craiova, Romania
Medal record
Men's table tennis
Representing Italy
Mediterranean Games
Silver medal – second place	2013 Mersin	Team

Mihai Razvan Bobocica (born 8 September 1986, in Craiova) is a Romanian-born Italian table tennis Olympian player who competed at the 2008 and 2012 Summer Olympics. From next season Mihai will represent table tennis club in Poland – Zooleszcz Gwiazda Bydgoszcz, As of December 2014, he is ranked no. 56, his best ranking.

Since 2011 Mihai Bobocica practices at the Werner Schlager Academy in Schwechat, Austria.

Bobocia qualified for the 2017 World Table Tennis Championships, then he was defeated in the first round, having been seeded against the No. 1 seed, and eventual winner, Ma Long.
