= Kalinikos Kreanga =

Greek table tennis player

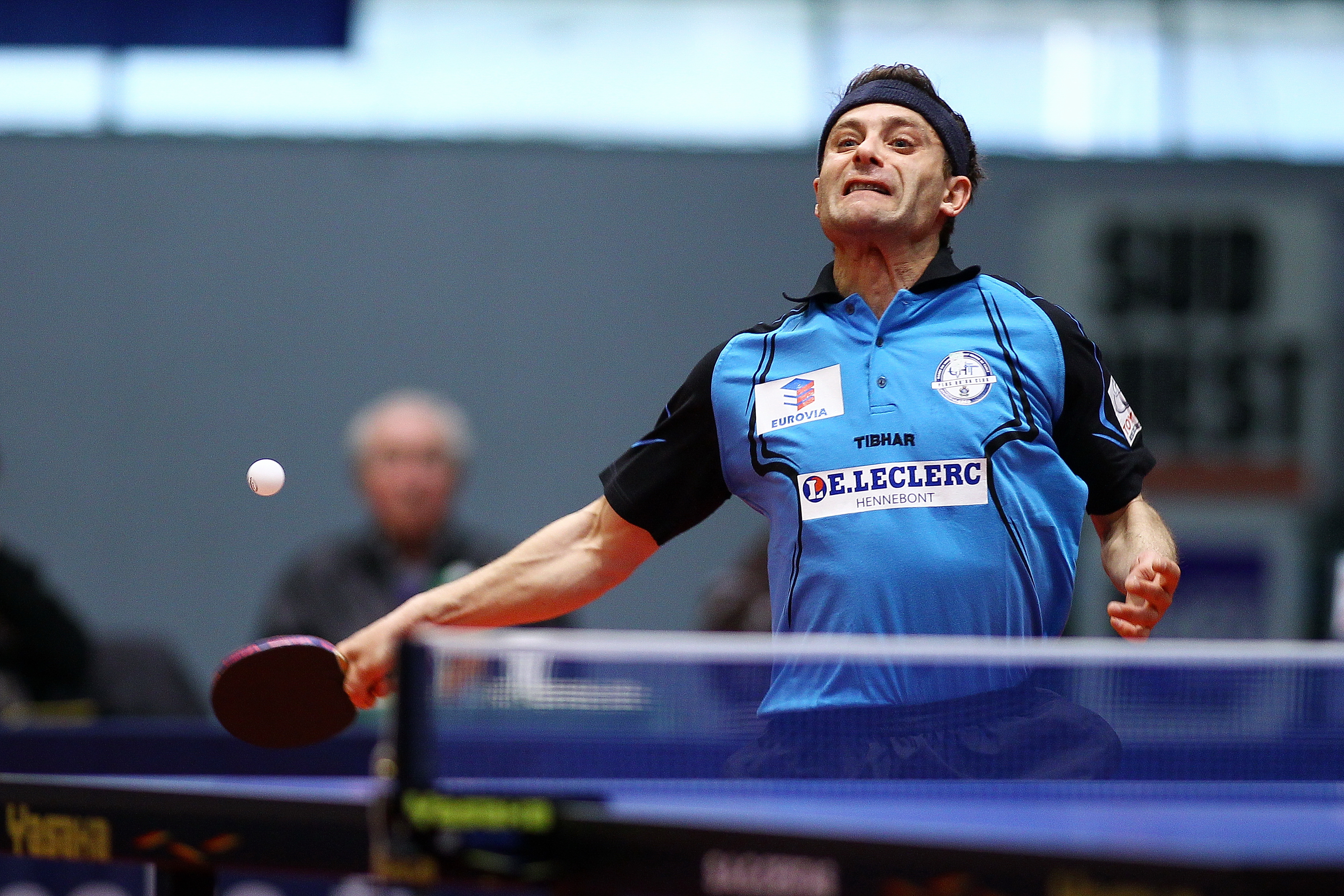
- Kreanga in 2010.

Personal information
- Full name: Kalinikos Kreanga
- Nationality: Romania Greece
- Born: 8 March 1972 (age 54) Bistriţa, Romania
- Height: 1.68 m (5 ft 6 in)
- Weight: 62 kg (137 lb; 9.8 st)

Sport
- Sport: Table tennis
Medal record
Men's table tennis
Representing Greece
World Championships
Bronze medal – third place	1991 Chiba City	Mixed Doubles
Bronze medal – third place	2003 Paris	Singles
World Cup
Silver medal – second place	2003 Jiangyin	Singles
Silver medal – second place	2004 Hangzhou	Singles
European Championships
Gold medal – first place	1992 Stuttgart	Mixed Doubles
Gold medal – first place	1994 Birmingham	Doubles
Silver medal – second place	1994 Birmingham	Mixed Doubles
Silver medal – second place	1996 Bratislava	Mixed Doubles
Silver medal – second place	1998 Eindhoven	Doubles
Silver medal – second place	2000 Bremen	Doubles
Silver medal – second place	2002 Zagreb	Singles
Silver medal – second place	2005 Aarhus	Doubles
Silver medal – second place	2013 Schwechat	Team
Bronze medal – third place	1996 Bratislava	Doubles
Bronze medal – third place	2005 Aarhus	Singles
Representing Romania
European Championships
Bronze medal – third place	1988 Paris	Mixed Doubles

Kalinikos Kreanga (born March 8, 1972) is a Greek (formerly Romanian) table tennis player. Born as Călin Creangă, he chose to defect from Communist-ruled Romania at the age of 17 (with his father) while he was participating in the European Table Tennis Youth Championships in Luxembourg in 1989.

Born in Bistriţa, Romania, Kreanga started to play table tennis at the age of 7. His first coach was Gheorghe Bozga, who would later discover Mihaela Steff.

While in Luxembourg, he received an offer to play in Greece, so he decided to move there. Being a minor, he quickly acquired Greek citizenship, and changed his name to Kalinikos Kreanga.

He has been one of the dominant European table tennis players since the beginning of the 1990s, and uses the shakehand grip to hold the racket. His favorite offensive weapons seem to be the forehand topspin and an incredibly strong backhand topspin. His backhand topspin is regarded as one of the most devastating in the history of the game, not limited by its unorthodox technique.

In 2004 he reached No 7 in the World Rankings.

== Team history ==
- A.C. Zografou (Greece) (until 1995)
- Finower TTC (1995/96; 2. Bundesliga, Germany)
- Royal Villette Charleroi, (Belgium), since 1996)
- TTC Weinheim (2.BL, Germany)
- TTF Ochsenhausen (Germany)
- Montpellier TT (France)
- Hennebont (France)

== Results ==
Bronze medal in the mixed doubles competition at the World Championships, Chiba City, 1991.

Winner of the European Championships in mixed doubles (1992) and men's doubles (1994). Runner-up in men's singles (2002).

Bronze medal in the singles competition at the World Championships, Paris, 2003.

Runner-up at the Men's World Cup in 2003 and 2004.

Winner of the Europe Top-12, 2011.

== See also ==
- List of Eastern Bloc defectors
