= 2025 ITTF-ATTU Asian Cup =

2025 Asian Cup Table Tennis Championships

Tournament details
- Dates: 19–23 February 2025
- Edition: 34th
- Competitors: 32 men and 32 women
- Venue: Shenzhen Universiade Sports Centre
- Location: Shenzhen, China

The 2025 ITTF-ATTU Asian Cup, also known as the Asian Cup Table Tennis Championships or simply the Asian Cup, was the 34th edition of the Asian Cup. It was held from 19 to 23 February 2025 at the Shenzhen Universiade Sports Centre in Shenzhen, China. The top four finishers in each event qualified directly for the Table Tennis World Cup.

== Medalists ==
Event	Gold	Silver	Bronze
Men's Singles	(China) Wang Chuqin	(China) Liang Jingkun	(China) Lin Shidong
Women's Singles	(China) Wang Manyu	(China) Sun Yingsha	(China) Kuai Man

== Seeds ==
The seeding was based on the ITTF World Ranking lists published on 11 February 2025. The seeded players were as follows:

Seed	Players	
Seed	Men's	Women's
1	(China) Lin Shidong	(China) Sun Yingsha
2	(China) Wang Chuqin	(China) Wang Manyu
3	(China) Liang Jingkun	(China) Wang Yidi
4	(Japan) Tomokazu Harimoto	(China) Chen Xingtong
5	(China) Lin Gaoyuan	(Japan) Hina Hayata
6	(South Korea) Jang Woo-jin	(Japan) Miwa Harimoto
7	(Chinese Taipei) Lin Yun-ju	(China) Kuai Man
8	(Chinese Taipei) Kao Cheng-jui	(Japan) Satsuki Odo
9	(South Korea) An Jae-hyun	(Japan) Mima Ito
10	(South Korea) Cho Dae-seong	(South Korea) Shin Yu-bin
11	(Japan) Shunsuke Togami	(Chinese Taipei) Cheng I-ching
12	(China) Chen Yuanyu	(Japan) Miu Hirano
13	(Japan) Hiroto Shinozuka	(China) Shi Xunyao
14	(Japan) Yukiya Uda	(South Korea) Seo Hyo-won
15	(Japan) Sora Matsushima	(India) Sreeja Akula
16	(South Korea) Oh Jun-sung	(Chinese Taipei) Huang Yi-hua

== Men's Singles ==
=== Group stage ===
==== Group A ====
	Player	M	W	L	GW	GL
1	(China) Lin Shidong	3	3	0	9	0
13	(Japan) Hiroto Shinozuka	3	1	2	5	7
	(Hong Kong) Wong Chun Ting	3	1	2	4	7
	(Saudi Arabia) Ali Al-Khadrawi	3	1	2	4	8

==== Group B ====
	Player	M	W	L	GW	GL
2	(China) Wang Chuqin	3	3	0	9	2
14	(Japan) Yukiya Uda	3	2	1	6	3
	(Iran) Noshad Alamiyan	3	1	2	5	6
	(Qatar) Ahmed Korani	3	0	3	0	9

==== Group C ====
	Player	M	W	L	GW	GL
3	(China) Liang Jingkun	3	3	0	9	1
15	(Japan) Sora Matsushima	3	2	1	7	3
	(India) Sharath Kamal	3	1	2	3	6
	(Yemen) Ebrahim Gubran	3	0	3	0	9

==== Group D ====
	Player	M	W	L	GW	GL
	(China) Huang Youzheng	3	3	0	9	3
4	(Japan) Tomokazu Harimoto	3	2	1	7	3
16	(South Korea) Oh Jun-sung	3	1	2	3	8
	(Iran) Nima Alamian	3	0	3	4	9

==== Group E ====
	Player	M	W	L	GW	GL
5	(China) Lin Gaoyuan	3	3	0	9	4
10	(South Korea) Cho Dae-seong	3	2	1	8	3
	(Singapore) Pang Yew En Koen	3	1	2	4	8
	(Chinese Taipei) Huang Yan-cheng	3	0	3	3	9

==== Group F ====
	Player	M	W	L	GW	GL
11	(Japan) Shunsuke Togami	3	2	1	7	3
6	(South Korea) Jang Woo-jin	3	2	1	8	4
	(Chinese Taipei) Feng Yi-hsin	3	2	1	6	5
	(Singapore) Chew Zhe Yu Clarence	3	0	3	0	9

==== Group G ====
	Player	M	W	L	GW	GL
7	(Chinese Taipei) Lin Yun-ju	3	3	0	9	0
12	(China) Chen Yuanyu	3	1	2	4	6
	(Singapore) Izaac Quek	3	1	2	5	7
	(India) Manav Thakkar	3	1	2	3	8

==== Group H ====
	Player	M	W	L	GW	GL
9	(South Korea) An Jae-hyun	3	3	0	9	3
8	(Chinese Taipei) Kao Cheng-jui	3	1	2	6	7
	(Kazakhstan) Kirill Gerassimenko	3	1	2	6	8
	(India) Harmeet Desai	3	1	2	5	8

=== Knockout stage ===
Round of 16
1	(China) Lin Shidong	11	5	13	11
12	(China) Chen Yuanyu	6	11	11	2
14	(Japan) Yukiya Uda	8	12	11	9	13
9	(South Korea) An Jae-hyun	11	10	7	11	11
5	(China) Lin Gaoyuan	6	12	9	9
4	(Japan) Tomokazu Harimoto	11	10	11	11
6	(South Korea) Jang Woo-jin	14	14	7	3	8
3	(China) Liang Jingkun	12	12	11	11	11
(China) Huang Youzheng	6	11	11	11
10	(South Korea) Cho Dae-seong	11	9	9	4
15	(Japan) Sora Matsushima	11	3	1
7	(Chinese Taipei) Lin Yun-ju	13	11	11
11	(Japan) Shunsuke Togami	9	11	11	12
13	(Japan) Hiroto Shinozuka	11	6	4	10
8	(Chinese Taipei) Kao Cheng-jui	5	7	3
2	(China) Wang Chuqin	11	11	11

Quarterfinal
1	(China) Lin Shidong	11	11	11	10	11
14	(Japan) Yukiya Uda	7	6	4	12	7
4	(Japan) Tomokazu Harimoto	8	10	9	11	14	7
3	(China) Liang Jingkun	11	12	11	7	12	11
(China) Huang Youzheng	7	13	12	9	12	8	9
7	(Chinese Taipei) Lin Yun-ju	11	11	10	11	10	11	11
11	(Japan) Shunsuke Togami	7	6	7	7
2	(China) Wang Chuqin	11	11	11	11

Semifinal
1	(China) Lin Shidong	11	11	9	9	11	8	8
3	(China) Liang Jingkun	5	7	11	11	4	11	11
7	(Chinese Taipei) Lin Yun-ju	11	9	6	3	11	5
2	(China) Wang Chuqin	9	11	11	11	8	11

Final
3	(China) Liang Jingkun	7	2	14	5
2	(China) Wang Chuqin	11	11	16	11
Third place
1	(China) Lin Shidong	11	11	11	11
7	(Chinese Taipei) Lin Yun-ju	9	6	6	4

== Women's Singles ==
=== Group stage ===
==== Group A ====
	Player	M	W	L	GW	GL
1	(China) Sun Yingsha	3	3	0	9	0
	(Chinese Taipei) Chien Tung-chuan	3	2	1	6	3
15	(India) Sreeja Akula	3	1	2	3	6
	(Qatar) Aya Majdi	3	0	3	0	9

==== Group B ====
	Player	M	W	L	GW	GL
2	(China) Wang Manyu	3	3	0	9	1
	(South Korea) Lee Eun-hye	3	2	1	6	5
16	(Chinese Taipei) Huang Yi-hua	3	1	2	6	7
	(Iran) Neda Shahsavari	3	0	3	1	9

==== Group C ====
	Player	M	W	L	GW	GL
3	(China) Wang Yidi	3	3	0	9	2
	(South Korea) Kim Na-young	3	2	1	7	5
12	(Japan) Miu Hirano	3	1	2	6	6
	(Jordan) Rinad El-Hasani	3	0	3	0	9

==== Group D ====
	Player	M	W	L	GW	GL
4	(China) Chen Xingtong	3	3	0	9	0
14	(South Korea) Seo Hyo-won	3	2	1	6	3
	(Hong Kong) Doo Hoi Kem	3	1	2	3	6
	(Lebanon) Mariana Sahakian	3	0	3	0	9

==== Group E ====
	Player	M	W	L	GW	GL
11	(Chinese Taipei) Cheng I-ching	3	3	0	9	4
5	(Japan) Hina Hayata	3	2	1	8	5
	(Thailand) Orawan Paranang	3	1	2	7	8
	(India) Yashaswini Ghorpade	3	0	3	2	9

==== Group F ====
	Player	M	W	L	GW	GL
6	(Japan) Miwa Harimoto	3	3	0	9	2
10	(South Korea) Shin Yu-bin	3	2	1	7	4
	(Hong Kong) Zhu Chengzhu	3	1	2	3	6
	(Kazakhstan) Zauresh Akasheva	3	0	3	2	9

==== Group G ====
	Player	M	W	L	GW	GL
7	(China) Kuai Man	3	3	0	9	2
9	(Japan) Mima Ito	3	2	1	8	3
	(Singapore) Zeng Jian	3	1	2	3	6
	(Kazakhstan) Sarvinoz Mirkadirova	3	0	3	0	9

==== Group H ====
	Player	M	W	L	GW	GL
13	(China) Shi Xunyao	3	3	0	9	2
8	(Japan) Satsuki Odo	3	2	1	8	3
	(Thailand) Suthasini Sawettabut	3	1	2	3	6
	(India) Ayhika Mukherjee	3	0	3	0	9

=== Knockout stage ===
Round of 16
1	(China) Sun Yingsha	11	11	11
(South Korea) Lee Eun-hye	3	4	9
(South Korea) Kim Na-young	2	11	8	11	6
6	(Japan) Miwa Harimoto	11	4	11	4	11
13	(China) Shi Xunyao	3	5	2
9	(Japan) Mima Ito	11	11	11
5	(Japan) Hina Hayata	11	12	5	4	8
4	(China) Chen Xingtong	9	10	11	11	11
3	(China) Wang Yidi	11	8	11	8	11
10	(South Korea) Shin Yu-bin	6	11	4	11	6
(Chinese Taipei) Jian Tongjuan	13	11	5	7	7
7	(China) Kuai Man	11	9	11	11	11
11	(Chinese Taipei) Cheng I-ching	9	11	11	5	11
8	(Japan) Satsuki Odo	11	9	4	11	8
14	(South Korea) Seo Hyo-won	5	6	3
2	(China) Wang Manyu	11	11	11

Quarterfinal
1	(China) Sun Yingsha	11	4	12	8	11	13
6	(Japan) Miwa Harimoto	5	11	10	11	9	11
9	(Japan) Mima Ito	9	6	11	6	6
4	(China) Chen Xingtong	11	11	8	11	11
3	(China) Wang Yidi	11	11	11	7	8	7
7	(China) Kuai Man	13	8	9	11	11	11
11	(Chinese Taipei) Cheng I-ching	7	9	6	11	9
2	(China) Wang Manyu	11	11	11	3	11

Semifinal
1	(China) Sun Yingsha	11	11	11	14
4	(China) Chen Xingtong	7	7	5	12
7	(China) Kuai Man	7	4	13	11	10
2	(China) Wang Manyu	11	11	15	7	12

Final
1	(China) Sun Yingsha	5	9	6	6
2	(China) Wang Manyu	11	11	11	11
Third place
4	(China) Chen Xingtong	9	7	10	1
7	(China) Kuai Man	11	11	12	11
