= 2026 ITTF-ATTU Asian Cup =

Tournament details
- Dates: 4–8 February 2026
- Edition: 35th
- Competitors: 32 men and 32 women
- Venue: Wuyuan River Stadium
- Location: Haikou, China

The 2026 ITTF-ATTU Asian Cup was the 35th edition of the Asian Cup. It was held from 4 to 8 February 2026 at the Wuyuan River Stadium in Haikou, China. Players who reach the semifinals in this tournament will qualify for the 2026 ITTF World Cup.

== Playing System ==
The detailed rules for the playing system of the 2026 ITTF-ATTU Asian Cup are as follows:

Seeding for this event will be based on the International Table Tennis Federation (ITTF) World Singles Rankings published in week 6 of 2026 (3 February 2026). The tournament will be conducted in two stages.

The first stage is a group round. Thirty-two players will be divided into 8 groups of 4 players each, playing a round-robin within their group. The group draw method is as follows: the 8 highest-ranked players will be placed into Groups A to H in order; the remaining players will be allocated to the groups in sets of four according to their ranking using a modified 'snake' system. To ensure fairness, players from the same national or regional association will be drawn into different groups during the draw. After the group matches, the top two players from each group will advance to the second stage.

The second stage is a knockout stage, conducted as a single-elimination tournament. The draw for the knockout stage has specific rules: the winner of Group A is fixed in position 1, and the winner of Group B is fixed in position 16; the winners of Groups C and D will be drawn by lot into positions 8 or 9; the winners of Groups E to H will be randomly drawn into positions 4, 5, 12, or 13. The runners-up from each group will be randomly drawn into the remaining positions, with one key restriction: the two players from the same group in the first stage must be drawn into different halves of the knockout stage draw. Additionally, the association avoidance rule will not be applied in the knockout stage.

Regarding the match format, all matches in the first-stage group round will be best-of-five games. In the second stage, the round of 16 matches will be best-of-five games, while the quarterfinals, semifinals, and final will be best-of-seven games.

== Medalists ==
Event	Gold	Silver	Bronze
Men's Singles	(China) Wang Chuqin	(Japan) Tomokazu Harimoto	(Japan) Shunsuke Togami
Women's Singles	(China) Sun Yingsha	(China) Wang Manyu	(China) Kuai Man

== Seeds ==
The seeding will be based on the ITTF World Ranking lists published prior to the event. The seeded players will be as follows:

Seed	Players	
Seed	Men's	Women's
1	(China) Wang Chuqin	(China) Sun Yingsha
2	(China) Lin Shidong	(China) Wang Manyu
3	(Japan) Tomokazu Harimoto	(China) Chen Xingtong
4	(China) Xiang Peng	(China) Kuai Man
5	(South Korea) Jang Woo-jin	(China) Wang Yidi
6	(Japan) Shunsuke Togami	(Japan) Miwa Harimoto
7	(China) Zhou Qihao	(China) Chen Yi
8	(Japan) Yukiya Uda	(Japan) Hina Hayata
9	(China) Chen Yuanyu	(Japan) Honoka Hashimoto
10	(Japan) Hiroto Shinozuka	(South Korea) Shin Yu-bin
11	(Japan) Yuta Tanaka	(Japan) Miyu Nagasaki
12	(China) Chen Junsong	(South Korea) Kim Na-yeong
13	(Hong Kong) Wong Chun Ting	(Singapore) Zeng Jian
14	(Chinese Taipei) Feng Yi-hsin	(Hong Kong) Doo Hoi Kem
15	(Kazakhstan) Kirill Gerassimenko	(Japan) Kaho Akae
16	(Chinese Taipei) Kuo Guan-hong	(India) Manika Batra

Seed	Players	
Seed	Men's	Women's
17	(Chinese Taipei) Liao Cheng-ting	(Chinese Taipei) Li Yu-jhun
18	(India) Snehit Suravajjula	(Chinese Taipei) Yeh Yi-tian
19	(Chinese Taipei) Chang Yu-an	(Hong Kong) Su Tsz Tung
20	(India) Akash Pal	(Chinese Taipei) Chien Tung-chuan
21	(Hong Kong) Lam Siu Hang	(Thailand) Orawan Paranang
22	(India) Ankur Bhattacharjee	(Chinese Taipei) Huang Yu-jie
23	(Singapore) Pang Yew En Koen	(Thailand) Suthasini Sawettabut
24	(Singapore) Izaac Quek	(Singapore) Ser Lin Qian
25	(Kazakhstan) Alan Kurmangaliyev	(India) Swastika Ghosh
26	(Malaysia) Wong Qi Shen	(Kazakhstan) Zauresh Akasheva
27	(Hong Kong) Kwan Man Ho	(Singapore) Tan Zhao Yun
28	(Hong Kong) Ho Kwan Kit	(Kazakhstan) Sarvinoz Mirkadirova
29	(Qatar) Mohammed Abdulwahhab	(Syria) Hend Zaza
30	(Saudi Arabia) Abdulaziz Bu Shulaybi	(Qatar) Aya Majdi
31	(Saudi Arabia) Ali Alkhadrawi	(Uzbekistan) Arujan Kamalova
32	(Kazakhstan) Aidos Kenzhikulov	(Lebanon) Mariana Sahakian

== Men's Singles ==
=== Group Stage ===
==== Group 1 ====
Player	M	W	L	GW	GL	Pts
(China) Wang Chuqin (1)	3	3	0	9	1	6
(India) Akash Pal (20)	3	2	1	6	5	5
(Chinese Taipei) Feng Yi-hsin (14)	3	1	2	6	6	4
(Qatar) Mohammed Abdulwahhab (29)	3	0	3	0	9	3

==== Group 2 ====
Player	M	W	L	GW	GL	Pts
(China) Lin Shidong (2)	3	3	0	9	1	6
(Chinese Taipei) Kuo Guan-hong (16)	3	2	1	6	4	5
(India) Snehit Suravajjula (18)	3	1	2	3	8	4
(Saudi Arabia) Abdulaziz Bu Shulaybi (30)	3	0	3	4	9	3

==== Group 3 ====
Player	M	W	L	GW	GL	Pts
(Hong Kong) Wong Chun Ting (13)	3	3	0	9	5	6
(Japan) Tomokazu Harimoto (3)	3	2	1	7	4	5
(Chinese Taipei) Liao Cheng-ting (17)	3	1	2	5	6	4
(Kazakhstan) Aidos Kenzhikulov (32)	3	0	3	3	9	3

==== Group 4 ====
Player	M	W	L	GW	GL	Pts
(China) Xiang Peng (4)	3	3	0	9	1	6
(Chinese Taipei) Chang Yu-an (19)	3	2	1	7	5	5
(Kazakhstan) Kirill Gerassimenko (15)	3	1	2	4	6	4
(Saudi Arabia) Ali Alkhadrawi (31)	3	0	3	1	9	3

==== Group 5 ====
Player	M	W	L	GW	GL	Pts
(Japan) Hiroto Shinozuka (10)	3	3	0	9	2	6
(Singapore) Izaac Quek (24)	3	2	1	6	5	5
(Hong Kong) Kwan Man Ho (27)	3	1	2	3	6	4
(South Korea) Jang Woo-jin (5)	3	0	3	4	9	2 (Note: Jang Woo-jin withdrew after losing two matches, only two points are given.)

==== Group 6 ====
Player	M	W	L	GW	GL	Pts
(Japan) Shunsuke Togami (6)	3	3	0	9	1	6
(Kazakhstan) Alan Kurmangaliyev (25)	3	1	2	5	6	4 (Note: Alan Kurmangaliyev ranked second based on the best win-loss ratio (4:3) in the three-way tie, excluding results against Shunsuke Togami.)
(China) Chen Yuanyu (9)	3	1	2	5	7	4
(India) Ankur Bhattacharjee (22)	3	1	2	3	8	4

==== Group 7 ====
Player	M	W	L	GW	GL	Pts
(China) Zhou Qihao (7)	3	3	0	9	1	6
(Japan) Yuta Tanaka (11)	3	2	1	6	5	5
(Singapore) Pang Yew En Koen (23)	3	1	2	5	7	4
(Hong Kong) Ho Kwan Kit (28)	3	0	3	2	9	3

==== Group 8 ====
Player	M	W	L	GW	GL	Pts
(Japan) Yukiya Uda (8)	3	2	1	8	4	5 (Note: Yukiya Uda topped the group by having the greatest games won:lost ratio. Tiebreaker rule: games won:lost ratio among 3 players (excluding the result against Wong Qi Shen (4th)): Yukiya Uda 5:3, Lam Siu Hang 5:5, Chen Junsong 3:5)
(Hong Kong) Lam Siu Hang (21)	3	2	1	8	5	5
(China) Chen Junsong (12)	3	2	1	6	7	5
(Malaysia) Wong Qi Shen (26)	3	0	3	3	9	3

=== Knockout Stage ===
Round of 16
1	(China) Wang C. (Group 1 Winner)	11	13	11
24	(Singapore) Quek (Group 5 Runner-up)	6	11	5
25	(Kazakhstan) Kurmangaliyev (Group 6 Runner-up)	4	6	8
7	(China) Zhou Q. (Group 7 Winner)	11	11	11
8	(Japan) Uda (Group 8 Winner)	11	12	12	7	11
16	(Chinese Taipei) Kuo (Group 2 Runner-up)	7	14	10	11	6
19	(Chinese Taipei) Chang (Group 4 Runner-up)	11	11	11
13	(Hong Kong) Wong C. (Group 3 Winner)	9	6	9
4	(China) Xiang P. (Group 4 Winner)	11	9	8	11	11
21	(Hong Kong) Lam (Group 8 Runner-up)	7	11	11	8	13
3	(Japan) Harimoto (Group 3 Runner-up)	11	11	11
10	(Japan) Shinozuka (Group 5 Winner)	9	4	6
6	(Japan) Togami (Group 6 Winner)	17	2	11	11
11	(Japan) Tanaka (Group 7 Runner-up)	15	11	9	6
20	(India) Pal (Group 1 Runner-up)	1	9	4
2	(China) Lin S. (Group 2 Winner)	11	11	11

Quarterfinals
1	(China) Wang C.	7	11	11	7	11	11
7	(China) Zhou Q.	11	4	8	11	6	6
8	(Japan) Uda	8	8	11	13	8	11	5
19	(Chinese Taipei) Chang	11	11	3	11	11	9	11
21	(Hong Kong) Lam	5	5	6	4
3	(Japan) Harimoto	11	11	11	11
6	(Japan) Togami	9	11	8	7	11	11	11
2	(China) Lin S.	11	9	11	11	7	9	7

Semifinals
1	(China) Wang C.	11	11	11	11
19	(Chinese Taipei) Chang	9	5	5	7
3	(Japan) Harimoto	6	11	11	11	11
6	(Japan) Togami	11	6	9	7	8

Final
1	(China) Wang C.	9	11	7	11	11	11
3	(Japan) Harimoto	11	8	11	5	8	6
Third place
19	(Chinese Taipei) Chang	3	8	12	12	4
6	(Japan) Togami	11	11	14	10	11

== Women's Singles ==
=== Group Stage ===
==== Group 1 ====
Player	M	W	L	GW	GL	Pts
(China) Sun Yingsha (1)	3	3	0	9	0	6
(Chinese Taipei) Yeh Yi-tian (18)	3	2	1	6	3	5
(India) Manika Batra (16)	3	1	2	3	6	4
(Syria) Hend Zaza (29)	3	0	3	0	9	0 (Note: Hend Zaza withdrew from the tournament.)

==== Group 2 ====
Player	M	W	L	GW	GL	Pts
(China) Wang Manyu (2)	3	3	0	9	0	6
(Japan) Kaho Akae (15)	3	1	2	3	6	4
(Chinese Taipei) Li Yu-jhun (17)	3	1	2	3	6	4
(Qatar) Aya Majdi (30)	3	0	3	0	9	3

==== Group 3 ====
Player	M	W	L	GW	GL	Pts
(China) Chen Xingtong (3)	3	3	0	9	1	6
(Hong Kong) Doo Hoi Kem (14)	3	2	1	7	4	5
(Chinese Taipei) Chien Tung-chuan (20)	3	1	2	4	7	4
(Uzbekistan) Arujan Kamalova (31)	3	0	3	1	9	3

==== Group 4 ====
Player	M	W	L	GW	GL	Pts
(China) Kuai Man (4)	3	3	0	9	0	6
(Hong Kong) Su Tsz Tung (19)	3	2	1	6	4	5
(Singapore) Zeng Jian (13)	3	1	2	4	6	4
(Lebanon) Mariana Sahakian (32)	3	0	3	0	9	3

==== Group 5 ====
Player	M	W	L	GW	GL	Pts
(Japan) Miyu Nagasaki (11)	3	3	0	9	1	6
(China) Wang Yidi (5)	3	2	1	7	3	5
(Singapore) Ser Lin Qian (24)	3	1	2	3	6	4
(Kazakhstan) Sarvinoz Mirkadirova (28)	3	0	3	0	9	3

==== Group 6 ====
Player	M	W	L	GW	GL	Pts
(Japan) Miwa Harimoto (6)	3	3	0	9	3	6
(South Korea) Kim Na-yeong (12)	3	2	1	7	4	5
(Thailand) Suthasini Sawettabut (23)	3	1	2	4	6	4
(India) Swastika Ghosh (25)	3	0	3	2	9	3

==== Group 7 ====
Player	M	W	L	GW	GL	Pts
(Japan) Honoka Hashimoto (9)	3	3	0	9	1	6
(China) Chen Yi (7)	3	2	1	7	3	5
(Thailand) Orawan Paranang (21)	3	1	2	3	6	4
(Singapore) Tan Zhao Yun (27)	3	0	3	0	9	3

==== Group 8 ====
Player	M	W	L	GW	GL	Pts
(Japan) Hina Hayata (8)	3	3	0	9	4	6
(South Korea) Shin Yu-bin (10)	3	2	1	8	5	5
(Chinese Taipei) Huang Yu-jie (22)	3	1	2	4	6	4
(Kazakhstan) Zauresh Akasheva (26)	3	0	3	2	9	3

=== Knockout Stage ===
Round of 16
1	(China) Sun Y. (Group 1 Winner)	7	11	11	11
12	(South Korea) Kim N. (Group 6 Runner-up)	11	2	8	8
7	(China) Chen Yi (Group 7 Runner-up)	11	8	11	11
8	(Japan) Hayata (Group 8 Winner)	4	11	4	4
11	(Japan) Nagasaki (Group 5 Winner)	9	11	6	11	11
15	(Japan) Akae (Group 2 Runner-up)	11	7	11	8	8
14	(Hong Kong) Doo (Group 3 Runner-up)	11	6	7	11
4	(China) Kuai Man (Group 4 Winner)	8	11	11	13
3	(China) Chen X. (Group 3 Winner)	11	11	11
19	(Hong Kong) Su (Group 4 Runner-up)	8	5	5
18	(Chinese Taipei) Yeh (Group 1 Runner-up)	3	7	5
6	(Japan) M. Harimoto (Group 6 Winner)	11	11	11
9	(Japan) Hashimoto (Group 7 Winner)	6	11	11	7	7
10	(South Korea) Shin (Group 8 Runner-up)	11	6	8	11	11
5	(China) Wang Y. (Group 5 Runner-up)	6	6	5
2	(China) Wang M. (Group 2 Winner)	11	11	11

Quarterfinals
1	(China) Sun Y.	11	11	6	11	11
7	(China) Chen Yi	4	9	11	4	6
11	(Japan) Nagasaki	6	6	11	5	4
4	(China) Kuai Man	11	11	6	11	11
3	(China) Chen X.	7	8	13	8	9
6	(Japan) M. Harimoto	11	11	11	11	11
10	(South Korea) Shin	1	3	13	5	14	5
2	(China) Wang M.	11	11	11	11	12	11

Semifinals
1	(China) Sun Y.	8	11	6	11	11	11
4	(China) Kuai Man	11	7	11	7	4	9
6	(Japan) M. Harimoto	11	3	12	11	8	8
2	(China) Wang M.	7	11	14	8	11	11

Final
1	(China) Sun Y.	11	4	11	6	11	6	13
2	(China) Wang M.	2	11	9	11	7	11	11
Third place
4	(China) Kuai Man	9	11	11	11	11
6	(Japan) M. Harimoto	11	5	3	5	7
