= 2023 Asian Table Tennis Championships – Men's singles =

Table tennis competition

Men's singles at the 2023 Asian Table Tennis Championships
- Venue: Yongpyong Dome
- Date: 7–10 September 2023

The men's singles at the 2023 Asian Table Tennis Championships in Pyeongchang was held at Yongpyong Dome from 7 to 10 September 2023.

== System of play ==
All individual events shall be played in a knock-out system. Matches in Singles events and Doubles events shall be played in best of five (5) games in all stages of the competition.

== Schedule ==
All times are Arabia Standard Time (UTC+03:00)

Date	Time	Round
Thursday, 7 September 2023	12:00	R1 (1/128)
Thursday, 7 September 2023	19:30	R2 (1/64)
Friday, 8 September 2023	11:20	R3 (1/32)
Friday, 8 September 2023	16:40	R4 (1/16)
Friday, 8 September 2023	19:50	Quarterfinals
Sunday, 10 September 2023	11:20	Semifinals
Sunday, 10 September 2023	16:00	Final

== Main bracket ==
=== Top Draw ===
==== Section 1 ====
Round of 128
(Hong Kong) Kwan MH	11	11	11	3
(Bangladesh) R Bawm	4	6	8	0
(Pakistan) MS Khan	11	11	11	3
(Laos) C Ximom	6	4	5	0
(Malaysia) J Choong	11	11	11	3
(Thailand) P Sanguansin	9	2	5	0

Round of 64
1	(China) Fan Z	11	11	11	3
(Hong Kong) Kwan MH	7	3	4	0
(Japan) R Yoshiyama	2	11	12	11	3
(Singapore) Beh KT	11	8	10	3	1
(South Korea) Oh J-s	11	11	11	3
(Pakistan) MS Khan	8	5	6	0
(Malaysia) J Choong	9	11	11	6	10	2
15	(Iran) No Alamian	11	6	8	11	12	3

Round of 32
1	(China) Fan Z	11	11	11	3
(Japan) R Yoshiyama	6	2	8	0
(South Korea) Oh J-s	9	8	14	6	1
15	(Iran) No Alamian	11	11	12	11	3

Round of 16
1	(China) Fan Z	11	11	11	3
15	(Iran) No Alamian	4	6	7	0

==== Section 2 ====
Round of 128
(India) H Desai	11	11	11	3
(Qatar) M Abdulwahhab	9	6	3	0
(Kazakhstan) K Gerassimenko	11	11	11	3
(Mongolia) A Bilguun	2	3	8	0
(Saudi Arabia) A Bu Shulaybi
(Sri Lanka) D Silva	w	/	o
(Chinese Taipei) Y T-y	11	11	11	3
(Uzbekistan) K Teshaboev	7	8	7	0

Round of 64
16	(Hong Kong) Wong C-t	11	7	6	11	11	3
(India) H Desai	2	11	11	7	7	2
(Kazakhstan) K Gerassimenko	11	11	11	3
(Nepal) B Shrestha	2	2	4	0
(Malaysia) Lee YY	11	11	3	11	3
(Sri Lanka) D Silva	7	2	11	9	1
(Chinese Taipei) Y T-y	7	5	7	0
7	(South Korea) Jang W-j	11	11	11	3

Round of 32
16	(Hong Kong) Wong C-t	11	8	11	11	1
(Kazakhstan) K Gerassimenko	9	11	8	4	3
(Malaysia) Lee YY	3	8	3	0
7	(South Korea) Jang W-j	11	11	11	3

Round of 16
16	(Hong Kong) Wong C-t	9	17	11	11	12	3
7	(South Korea) Jang W-j	11	19	2	9	10	2

==== Section 3 ====
Round of 128
(Singapore) Pang YEK	w	/	o
(Philippines) J Nayre
(Pakistan) Z Salam	4	3	5	0
(Hong Kong) Ng PN	11	11	11	3
(Kazakhstan) A Kenzhigulov	10	9	3	0
(India) S Gnanasekaran	12	11	11	3
(Sri Lanka) N Kahawaththa	5	9	9	0
(Malaysia) Wong QS	11	11	11	3

Round of 64
5	(China) Liang J	11	11	11	3
(Singapore) Pang YEK	4	1	3	0
(Hong Kong) Ng PN	11	11	11	3
(Bangladesh) I Imon	3	7	9	0
(Yemen) EA Gubran	13	4	6	0
(India) S Gnanasekaran	15	11	11	3
(Malaysia) Wong QS	8	10	9	0
13	(South Korea) An J-h	11	12	11	3

Round of 32
5	(China) Liang J	11	11	10	11	3
(Hong Kong) Ng PN	3	5	12	7	1
(India) S Gnanasekaran	11	9	5	11	13	2
13	(South Korea) An J-h	9	11	11	9	13	3

Round of 16
5	(China) Liang J	11	11	11	3
13	(South Korea) An J-h	3	7	6	0

==== Section 4 ====
Round of 128
(Qatar) A Al-Awlaqi
(India) M Shah	w	/	0
(Saudi Arabia) K Al-Shareif	11	11	11	3
(Mongolia) M Manlaijargal	9	6	7	0
(Kyrgyzstan) A Kasymov	3	4	2	0
(Uzbekistan) Z Kenjaev	11	11	11	3
(Iran) A Norouzi	11	4	11	11	3
(Singapore) L Tan	7	11	3	9	1

Round of 64
10	(Chinese Taipei) Chuang C-y	11	11	11	3
(India) M Shah	8	8	9	0
(Saudi Arabia) K Al-Shareif	10	11	11	11	3
(Nepal) S Kapali	12	8	9	9	1
(Thailand) S Nuchchart	9	11	8	8	1
(Uzbekistan) Z Kenjaev	11	9	11	1	3
(Iran) A Norouzi	11	7	11	11	3
4	(Japan) T Harimoto	4	11	4	9	1

Round of 32
10	(Chinese Taipei) Chuang C-y	11	11	11	3
(Saudi Arabia) K Al-Shareif	4	1	9	0
(Uzbekistan) Z Kenjaev	3	11	5	0
(Iran) A Norouzi	11	13	11	3

Round of 16
10	(Chinese Taipei) Chuang C-y	11	6	11	11	3
(Iran) A Norouzi	2	11	8	6	1

=== Bottom Draw ===
==== Section 5 ====
Round of 128
(Singapore) I Quek	8	12	11	12	1
(South Korea) Park G-h	11	10	13	14	3
(Thailand) N Thanmathikom	9	11	13	11	3
(Kyrgyzstan) A Kasymov	11	4	11	5	1
(Pakistan) SO Shah	5	11	6	0
(Malaysia) Hong YT	11	13	11	3
(Philippines) E Tormis
(Nepal) R Maharjan	w	/	o

Round of 64
3	(China) Ma L	11	11	12
(South Korea) Park G-h	9	9	10	0
(Thailand) N Thanmathikom	11	13	11	3
(Iran) S Amirinia	2	11	3	0
(India) MV Thakkar	11	12	11	3
(Malaysia) Hong YT	9	10	6	0
(Nepal) R Maharjan	2	6	8	0
12	(Chinese Taipei) Kao C-j	11	11	11	3

Round of 32
3	(China) Ma L	11	11	11	3
(Thailand) N Thanmathikom	2	4	5	0
(India) MV Thakkar	11	8	11	11	3
12	(Chinese Taipei) Kao C-j	8	11	7	7	1

Round of 16
3	(China) Ma L	11	12	11	3
(India) MV Thakkar	9	10	5	0

==== Section 6 ====
Round of 128
(Sri Lanka) V Hendahewa	5	6	9	0
(Qatar) F Al-Mughanne	11	11	11	3
(Saudi Arabia) T Al-Mutairi	11	11	12	3
(Laos) L Manichanh	6	7	10	0
(Thailand) S Tancharoen	3	9	10
(Kazakhstan) V Zakharov	11	11	12	3
(Uzbekistan) A Anorboev	11	11	11	3
(Bangladesh) MA Ridoy	6	8	6	0

Round of 64
11	(Japan) H Shinozuka	w	/	o
(Qatar) F Al-Mughanne
(Saudi Arabia) T Al-Mutairi	8	8	6	0
(Mongolia) S-O Gankhuyag	11	11	11	3
(Hong Kong) Lam S-h	11	11	11	11	3
(Kazakhstan) V Zakharov	4	13	4	9	1
(Uzbekistan) A Anorboev	5	2	5	0
6	(China) Lin G	11	11	11	3

Round of 32
11	(Japan) H Shinozuka	11	10	11	11	3
(Mongolia) S-O Gankhuyag	3	12	3	3	1
(Hong Kong) Lam S-h	4	7	3	0
6	(China) Lin G	11	11	11	3

Round of 16
11	(Japan) H Shinozuka	11	10	11	5	6	2
6	(China) Lin G	9	12	7	11	11	3

==== Section 7 ====
Round of 128
(Uzbekistan) S Iskandarov	7	12	2	12	5	2
(Iran) AH Hodaei	11	10	11	10	11	3
(Kazakhstan) A Kurmangaliyev	12	11	11	3
(Singapore) Chew ZYC	10	2	5	0
(Saudi Arabia) A Al-Khadrawi	11	11	11	3
(Laos) A Vongsa	6	5	4	0
(Sri Lanka) J de Silva	3	12	10	10	1
(Mongolia) T Myandal	11	10	12	12	3

Round of 64
8	(Chinese Taipei) Lin Y-j	11	11	11	3
(Iran) AH Hodaei	5	6	7	0
(Kazakhstan) A Kurmangaliyev	w	/	o
(Qatar) A Abdulwahhab
(Hong Kong) Ho KT	7	11	11	11	3
(Saudi Arabia) A Al-Khadrawi	11	9	6	5	1
(Mongolia) T Myandal	4	5	6	0
14	(Japan) S Togami	11	11	11	3

Round of 32
8	(Chinese Taipei) Lin Y-j	11	11	11	3
(Kazakhstan) A Kurmangaliyev	8	6	5	0
(Hong Kong) Ho KT	3	2	8	0
14	(Japan) S Togami	11	11	11	3

Round of 16
8	(Chinese Taipei) Lin Y-j	11	11	11	3
14	(Japan) S Togami	1	4	9	0

==== Section 8 ====
Round of 128
(Bangladesh) N Iqbal	9	7	8	0
(Oman) M Al-Balushi	11	11	11	3
(Chinese Taipei) Huang Y-c	11	11	11	3
(Pakistan) T Khan	5	3	5	0
(Kyrgyzstan) At Kasymov	4	3	3	0
(Malaysia) Leong CF	11	11	11	3
(Thailand) P Tanviriyavechakul	6	8	0	0
(Japan) Y Tanaka	11	11	11	3

Round of 64
9	(South Korea) Lim J-h	11	11	11	3
(Oman) M Al-Balushi	3	2	0	0
(Chinese Taipei) Huang Y-c	11	12	6	11	3
(Iran) Ni Alamian	7	10	11	6	0
(India) SK Achanta	11	11	13	11	3
(Malaysia) Leong CF	7	8	15	9	1
(Japan) Y Tanaka	6	14	3	11	11	3
2	(China) Wang C	11	12	11	5	7	2

Round of 32
9	(South Korea) Lim J-h	11	11	8	11	3
(Chinese Taipei) Huang Y-c	3	7	11	6	1
(India) SK Achanta	8	8	7	0
(Japan) Y Tanaka	11	11	11	3

Round of 16
9	(South Korea) Lim J-h	10	12	9	7	1
(Japan) Y Tanaka	12	10	11	11	3

== Final bracket ==
Quarterfinals
1	(China) Fan Z	11	11	13	11	3
16	(Hong Kong) Wong C-t	13	7	11	3	1
5	(China) Liang J	11	11	11	3
10	(Chinese Taipei) Chuang C-y	5	2	7	0
3	(China) Ma L	7	11	11	6	13	3
6	(China) Lin G	11	8	3	11	11	2
8	(Chinese Taipei) Lin Y-j	11	11	11	3
(Japan) Y Tanaka	6	8	7	0

Semifinals
1	(China) Fan Z	19	8	11	11	3
5	(China) Liang J	17	11	7	8	1
3	(China) Ma L	11	11	11	3
8	(Chinese Taipei) Lin Y-j	8	4	8	0

Final
1	(China) Fan Z	7	11	11	5	6	2
3	(China) Ma L	11	5	7	11	11	3
