= 2025 Asian Table Tennis Championships – Men's team =

Men's team at the 2025 Asian Table Tennis Championships
- Venue: Kalinga-Athletics HPC Building
- Date: 11–15 October 2025
- Competitors: 93 from 22 nations

The men's team in table tennis at the 2025 Asian Table Tennis Championships was held at Kalinga-Athletics HPC Building from 11 to 15 October 2025.

== Format ==
All matches in the team events will be played as a best-of-five series of individual matches, with the following order of play:

| Match 1 | Match 2 | Match 3 | Match 4 | Match 5 |
|---|---|---|---|---|
| A vs X | B vs Y | C vs Z | A vs Y | B vs X |

The team events are divided into two divisions:

=== First Division ===
- All teams, excluding the top 6 finishers from the 2024 edition, will compete in the 1st Division.
- Teams are divided into groups of 3 or 4.
- The winners of each group advance to First Division knock-out stage. The winners of semifinal 1 & 2 will be joining in Champions Division, whereas the losers in semifinal will be playing 9-10th position match.
- Remaining teams play additional matches in a progressive knock-out format to determine final placings. Since there are five groups,
  - Second place of each group will be joining in 12th-16th position bracket.
    - The loser in 12-16th quarterfinal will be ranked in 16th, and the rest will play in semi-final.
  - Third place of each group will be joining in 17th-21st position bracket.
    - The loser in 17-21st quarterfinal will be ranked in 21st, and the rest will play in semi-final.
  - Fourth place in Group 5 will not be playing position bracket and will be ranked the last place (22nd) in this tournament.

=== Champion Division ===
- It consists of:
  - The top 6 teams from the 2024 edition.
  - The 2 winners of First Division semifinal 1 & 2 from the 2025 edition.
- Play begins directly in quarterfinals. Teams lost in quarterfinals will be playing in 5-8th position bracket to determine the seeding for next edition.

== Seeding ==
The seeding was based on final results of 2024 Asian Table Tennis Championships.

=== Teams playing in Champions Division ===
| Seed | Team | Player 1 | Player 2 | Player 3 | Player 4 | Player 5 |
|---|---|---|---|---|---|---|
| 1 | China | Wang Chuqin | Lin Shidong | Liang Jingkun | Xiang Peng | Zhou Qihao |
| 2 | Chinese Taipei | Chang Yu-An | Lin Yen-Chun | Liao Cheng-Ting | Kuo Guan-Hong | — |
| 3-4 | South Korea | Jang Woo-jin | An Jaehyun | Park Gyu-hyeon | Cho Dae-seong | Oh Jun-sung |
| 3-4 | India | Snehit Suravajjula | Manav Thakkar | Manush Shah | Payas Jain | Ankur Bhattacharjee |
| 5 | Japan | Harimoto Tomokazu | Tanaka Yuta | Togami Shunsuke | Shinozuka Hiroto | Matsushima Sora |
| 6 | Hong Kong | Wong Chun Ting | Ho Kwan Kit | Yiu Kwan To | Lam Siu Hang | Chan Baldwin |

=== Teams playing in First Division ===
Q: Qualified to Champions Division

| Seed | Team | Player 1 | Player 2 | Player 3 | Player 4 | Player 5 |
|---|---|---|---|---|---|---|
| 7 | Kazakhstan | Kirill Gerassimenko | Alan Kurmangaliyev | Sanzhar Zhubanov | Aidos Kenzhigulov | Iskender Kharki |
| 8 | Iran (Q) | Nima Alamian | Noshad Alamiyan | Mohammad Mousavi Taher | Benyamin Faraji | Amir Hossein Hodaei |
| 9 | Singapore | Clarence Chew | Izaac Quek | Koen Pang | Ellsworth Le | Josh Chua |
| 10 | Malaysia | Wong Qi Shen | Tey Hong Yu | Danny Ng Wann Sing | Choong Javen | Im Jin Zhen |
| 11 | Thailand | Phakpoom Sanguansin | Puripong Saelee | Nawin Mekamporn | Sarayut Tancharoen | Thitaphat Preechayan |
| 12 | North Korea (Q) | Ham Yu Song | Ri Jong Sik | Chon Jong Bom | — | — |
| 13 | Qatar | Abdullah Abdulwahhab | Rawad Alnaser | Mohammed Abdulwahhab | — | — |
| 14 | Uzbekistan | Shahbozbek Gulomiddinov | Sarvarbek Gulomov | Ruzimukhammad Rakhmonov | — | — |
| 15 | Sri Lanka | Mohommed Mohamed | Chanul Kulappuwawadu | Chameera Ginige | Nimesh Ranchagoda | — |
| 16 | Mongolia | Manlaijargal Munkh-Ochir | Ankhbayar Bilguun | Temuulen Myandal | — | — |
| 17 | Maldives | Mohamed Shaffan | Mohamed Rafiu | Moosa Ahmed | Ahmed Akhyar | — |
| 18 | Kyrgyzstan | Tilek Moldaliev | Azamat Ergeshov | Talgat Sagyndykov | — | — |
| 19 | Oman | Ahmed Al Riyami | Mohammed Al Mutawa | Muhannad Al Balushi | — | — |
| 20 | Nepal | Rubin Maharjan | Rajeev Chikanbanjar | Sanyog Kapali | — | — |
| 21 | Macau | Chan Chi In | Zheng Hong Wai | He Chon Fai | — | — |
| 22 | Bangladesh | Mohutasin Ridoy | Mufradul Hamza | Ramhimlian Bawm | Abul Hasib | Md Javed Ahmed |

== First Division ==
=== Group Stage ===
==== Group 1 ====
| Pos | Team | Pld | W | L | Pts | Promotion | (Kazakhstan) KAZ (7) | (Sri Lanka) SRI (15) | (Kyrgyzstan) KGZ (18) |
|---|---|---|---|---|---|---|---|---|---|
| 1 | Kazakhstan (7) | 2 | 2 | 0 | 4 | First Division Knockout Stage | — | 3–0 | 3–0 |
| 2 | Sri Lanka (15) | 2 | 1 | 1 | 3 | 12-16th position bracket | 0–3 | — | 3–1 |
| 3 | Kyrgyzstan (18) | 2 | 0 | 2 | 2 | 17-21st position bracket | 0–3 | 1–3 | — |

Source: ITTF

==== Group 2 ====
| Pos | Team | Pld | W | L | Pts | Promotion | (Iran) IRI (8) | (Mongolia) MGL (16) | (Maldives) MDV (17) |
|---|---|---|---|---|---|---|---|---|---|
| 1 | Iran (8) | 2 | 2 | 0 | 4 | First Division Knockout Stage | — | 3–0 | 3–0 |
| 2 | Mongolia (16) | 2 | 1 | 1 | 3 | 12-16th position bracket | 0–3 | — | 3–1 |
| 3 | Maldives (17) | 2 | 0 | 2 | 2 | 17-21st position bracket | 0–3 | 1–3 | — |

Source: ITTF

==== Group 3 ====
| Pos | Team | Pld | W | L | Pts | Promotion | (Singapore) SGP (9) | (Uzbekistan) UZB (14) | (Oman) OMA (19) |
|---|---|---|---|---|---|---|---|---|---|
| 1 | Singapore (9) | 2 | 2 | 0 | 4 | First Division Knockout Stage | — | 3–0 | 3–0 |
| 2 | Uzbekistan (14) | 2 | 1 | 1 | 3 | 12-16th position bracket | 0–3 | — | 3–1 |
| 3 | Oman (19) | 2 | 0 | 2 | 2 | 17-21st position bracket | 0–3 | 1–3 | — |

Source: ITTF

==== Group 4 ====
| Pos | Team | Pld | W | L | Pts | Promotion | (North Korea) PRK (12) | (Malaysia) MAS (10) | (Macau) MAC (21) |
|---|---|---|---|---|---|---|---|---|---|
| 1 | (North Korea) DPR Korea (12) | 2 | 2 | 0 | 4 | First Division Knockout Stage | — | 3–1 | 3–0 |
| 2 | Malaysia (10) | 2 | 1 | 1 | 3 | 12-16th position bracket | 1–3 | — | 3–0 |
| 3 | Macau, China (21) | 2 | 0 | 2 | 2 | 17-21st position bracket | 0–3 | 0–3 | — |

Source: ITTF

==== Group 5 ====
| Pos | Team | Pld | W | L | Pts | Promotion | (Thailand) THA (11) | (Qatar) QAT (13) | (Bangladesh) BAN (22) | (Nepal) NEP (20) |
|---|---|---|---|---|---|---|---|---|---|---|
| 1 | Thailand (11) | 3 | 3 | 0 | 6 | First Division Knockout Stage | — | 3–0 | 3–0 | 3–0 |
| 2 | Qatar (13) | 3 | 2 | 1 | 5 | 12-16th position bracket | 0–3 | — | 3–0 | 3–1 |
| 3 | Bangladesh (22) | 3 | 1 | 2 | 4 | 17-21st position bracket | 0–3 | 0–3 | — | 3–1 |
| 4 | Nepal (20) | 3 | 0 | 3 | 3 | Final Position: 22nd (Will not play position bracket) | 0–3 | 1–3 | 1–3 | — |

Source: ITTF

=== Knockout Stage ===
==== First Division Knockout Stage ====
Quarterfinals (L11: 11th place in this tournament)
9 | Singapore | 3
11 | Thailand (L11) | 1

Semifinals (Winner in semis will be directly qualified to Champions division, and they will not play in final)
7 | Kazakhstan | 1
12 | (North Korea) DPR Korea | 3
9 | Singapore | 1
8 | Iran | 3

Advanced to Champions Division
12 | (North Korea) DPR Korea | Q
8 | Iran | Q
9-10th Final
7 | Kazakhstan | 2
9 | Singapore | 3

==== 12-16th position bracket ====
12-16th Quarterfinals; L16: 16th place in this tournament)
15 | Sri Lanka (L16) | 1
13 | Qatar | 3

12-15th Semifinals
10 | Malaysia | 3
16 | Mongolia | 0
13 | Qatar | 3
14 | Uzbekistan | 0

12-13th Final
10 | Malaysia | 3
13 | Qatar | 1
14-15th Final
16 | Mongolia | 3
14 | Uzbekistan | 2

==== 17-21st position bracket ====
17-21st Quarterfinals; L21: 21st place in this tournament)
18 | Kyrgyzstan | 3
19 | Oman (L21) | 0

17-20th Semifinals
17 | Maldives | 0
21 | Macau, China | 3
18 | Kyrgyzstan | 3
22 | Bangladesh | 1

17-18th Final
21 | Macau, China | 3
18 | Kyrgyzstan | 1
19-20th Final
17 | Maldives | 1
22 | Bangladesh | 3

== Champions Division ==
Quarterfinals (lost teams in QF will be playing in 5-8th position bracket)
1 | China | 3
8 | Iran (Q) | 1
5 | Japan | 3
3 | (South Korea) Republic of Korea | 1
4 | India | 0
6 | Hong Kong, China | 3
12 | (North Korea) DPR Korea (Q) | 2
2 | Chinese Taipei | 3

Semifinals
1 | China | 3
5 | Japan | 2
6 | Hong Kong, China | 3
2 | Chinese Taipei | 2

Final
1 | China | 3
6 | Hong Kong, China | 0

=== 5-8th position bracket ===
5th-8th semifinal
8 | Iran | 2
3 | (South Korea) Republic of Korea | 3
4 | India | 3
12 | (North Korea) DPR Korea | 2

5-6th final
3 | (South Korea) Republic of Korea | 3
4 | India | 0
7-8th final
8 | Iran | 1
12 | (North Korea) DPR Korea | 3

== Final Ranking ==
| Position | Team |
|---|---|
| 1 | China |
| 2 | Hong Kong, China |
| 3-4 | Japan |
| 3-4 | Chinese Taipei |
| 5 | (South Korea) Republic of Korea; Victory in 5-6th Final |
| 6 | India; Defeat in 5-6th Final |
| 7 | (North Korea) DPR Korea; Victory in 7-8th Final |
| 8 | Iran; Defeat in 7-8th Final |
| 9 | Singapore; Victory in 9-10th Final |
| 10 | Kazakhstan; Defeat in 9-10th Final |
| 11 | Thailand; Lost in First Division Knockout Stage Quarterfinal |
| 12 | Malaysia; Victory in 12-13th Final |
| 13 | Qatar; Defeat in 12-13th Final |
| 14 | Mongolia; Victory in 14-15th Final |
| 15 | Uzbekistan; Defeat in 14-15th Final |
| 16 | Sri Lanka; Lost in 12-16th Quarterfinal |
| 17 | Macau, China; Victory in 17-18th Final |
| 18 | Kyrgyzstan; Defeat in 17-18th Final |
| 19 | Bangladesh; Victory in 19-20th Final |
| 20 | Maldives; Defeat in 19-20th Final |
| 21 | Oman; Lost in 17-21st Quarterfinal |
| 22 | (Nepal) Nepal; Position fourth in First Division Group 5 |
