= Table tennis at the 2022 Asian Games – Men's singles =

Men's singles at the 2022 Asian Games
- Venue: Gongshu Canal Sports Park Gymnasium
- Date: 27 September – 2 October 2023
- Competitors: 44 from 22 nations

Medalists
gold medal	Wang Chuqin	China
silver medal	Fan Zhendong	China
bronze medal	Jang Woo-jin	South Korea
bronze medal	Wong Chun Ting	Hong Kong

The men's singles table tennis event at the 2022 Asian Games was held from 27 September to 2 October 2023 at the Gongshu Canal Sports Park Gymnasium.

== Schedule ==
All times are China Standard Time (UTC+08:00)

Date	Time	Event
Wednesday, 27 September 2023	10:00	Round of 64
Thursday, 28 September 2023	17:10	Round of 32
Friday, 29 September 2023	17:10	Round of 16
Saturday, 30 September 2023	17:00	Quarterfinals
Monday, 2 September 2018	13:30	Semifinals
Monday, 2 September 2018	19:45	Final

== Results ==
=== Finals ===
Quarterfinals
1	Fan Zhendong (CHN)	11	11	11	11
7	Chuang Chih-yuan (TPE)	7	8	1	4
5	Jang Woo-jin (KOR)	8	10	8	11	19	11	11
3	Tomokazu Harimoto (JPN)	11	12	11	9	17	4	8
4	Lin Yun-ju (TPE)	11	11	11	9	11	9	8
8	Wong Chun Ting (HKG)	13	8	7	11	9	11	11
6	Lim Jong-hoon (KOR)	6	6	5	5
2	Wang Chuqin (CHN)	11	11	11	11

Semifinals
1	Fan Zhendong (CHN)	11	12	11	11	11
5	Jang Woo-jin (KOR)	4	14	7	5	7
8	Wong Chun Ting (HKG)	5	5	15	5	11	9
2	Wang Chuqin (CHN)	11	11	13	11	5	11

Final
1	Fan Zhendong (CHN)	12	10	11	11	4	11	8
2	Wang Chuqin (CHN)	10	12	13	7	11	7	11

=== Top half ===
==== Section 1 ====
Round of 64					Round of 32							Round of 16
					1	Fan Zhendong (CHN)	11	11	11	11
						Afzalkhon Mahmudov (TJK)	1	2	6	6
												1	Fan Zhendong (CHN)	11	11	11	11
Ham Yu-song (PRK)	11	11	11	11								16	Lam Siu Hang (HKG)	4	3	6	3
Abdullah Abdulhussein (QAT)	8	6	2	7		Ham Yu-song (PRK)	11	12	5	5	10
					16	Lam Siu Hang (HKG)	9	14	11	11	12

==== Section 2 ====
Round of 64								Round of 32						Round of 16
								14	Sharath Kamal (IND)	11	11	11	11
Rubin Maharjan (NEP)	6	11	8	6	8				Mohamed Shaffan Ismail (MDV)	9	2	7	7
Mohamed Shaffan Ismail (MDV)	11	3	11	11	11									14	Sharath Kamal (IND)	7	10	11	5	12	11	8
Nguyễn Anh Tú (VIE)	11	9	9	11	11	9	7							7	Chuang Chih-yuan (TPE)	11	12	9	11	10	6	11
Sitisak Nuchchart (THA)	7	11	11	5	5	11	11		Sitisak Nuchchart (THA)	3	3	4	6
								7	Chuang Chih-yuan (TPE)	11	11	11	11

==== Section 3 ====
Round of 64						Round of 32						Round of 16
						5	Jang Woo-jin (KOR)	11	11	11	11
He Chon Fai (MAC)	11	5	11	12	11		He Chon Fai (MAC)	4	5	5	3
Myandalyn Temüülen (MGL)	6	11	4	10	8							5	Jang Woo-jin (KOR)	11	11	11	11
Ebrahim Gubran (YEM)	8	9	5	3								15	Koen Pang (SGP)	5	8	4	9
Rashed Khaled Sanad (BRN)	11	11	11	11			Rashed Khaled Sanad (BRN)	9	5	9	1
						15	Koen Pang (SGP)	11	11	11	11

==== Section 4 ====
Round of 64						Round of 32							Round of 16
						9	Noshad Alamian (IRI)	11	7	11	11	11
Muhammad Shah Khan (PAK)	6	7	9	12	2		Ali Al-Khadrawi (KSA)	5	11	6	4	3
Ali Al-Khadrawi (KSA)	11	11	11	10	11								9	Noshad Alamian (IRI)	9	10	8	11	12	10
													3	Tomokazu Harimoto (JPN)	11	12	11	5	10	12
							Alan Kurmangaliyev (KAZ)	3	4	11	5	3
						3	Tomokazu Harimoto (JPN)	11	11	5	11	11

=== Bottom half ===
==== Section 5 ====
Round of 64					Round of 32								Round of 16
					4	Lin Yun-ju (TPE)	11	11	11	11
						Faizan Zahoor (PAK)	7	2	1	5
													4	Lin Yun-ju (TPE)	12	11	11	11
Ubaydullo Sultonov (TJK)	4	5	8	6										Amir Hossein Hodaei (IRI)	6	6	2	6
Amir Hossein Hodaei (IRI)	11	11	11	11		Amir Hossein Hodaei (IRI)	11	11	5	11	4	11
					10	Izaac Quek (SGP)	7	7	11	6	11	9

==== Section 6 ====
Round of 64						Round of 32							Round of 16
						12	Maharu Yoshimura (JPN)	5	11	12	11	11
Cheong Chi Cheng (MAC)	3	6	6	9			Ri Jong-sik (PRK)	11	8	10	9	9
Ri Jong-sik (PRK)	11	11	11	11									12	Maharu Yoshimura (JPN)	7	11	13	11	11	5	7
Alyas Alyassi (BRN)	11	4	15	13	11								8	Wong Chun Ting (HKG)	11	13	11	5	3	11	11
Moosa Munsif Ahmed (MDV)	6	11	13	11	7		Alyas Alyassi (BRN)	2	7	2	4
						8	Wong Chun Ting (HKG)	11	11	11	11

==== Section 7 ====
Round of 64					Round of 32						Round of 16
					6	Lim Jong-hoon (KOR)	11	11	11	11
Omar Ahmed Ali (YEM)	11	11	11	11		Omar Ahmed Ali (YEM)	5	8	4	8
Sanyog Kapali (NEP)	8	7	9	6							6	Lim Jong-hoon (KOR)	11	11	8	11	11
Đinh Anh Hoàng (VIE)	11	11	11	11							11	Kirill Gerassimenko (KAZ)	5	7	11	7	4
Mohammed Abdulhussein (QAT)	2	8	8	6		Đinh Anh Hoàng (VIE)	5	3	4	11
					11	Kirill Gerassimenko (KAZ)	11	11	11	13

==== Section 8 ====
Round of 64								Round of 32						Round of 16
								13	Sathiyan Gnanasekaran (IND)	11	11	11	11
Gankhuyagiin Ser-Od (MGL)	11	9	11	11	13	11	9		Turki Al-Mutairi (KSA)	5	6	9	2
Turki Al-Mutairi (KSA)	13	11	8	13	11	3	11							13	Sathiyan Gnanasekaran (IND)	3	3	6	3
														2	Wang Chuqin (CHN)	11	11	11	11
									Napat Thanmathikom (THA)	4	5	8	5
								2	Wang Chuqin (CHN)	11	11	11	11
