= 2023 World Table Tennis Championships – Men's doubles =

Men's doubles at the 2023 World Table Tennis Championships
- Venue: Durban International Convention Centre
- Location: Durban, KwaZulu-Natal, South Africa
- Dates: 20–27 May

Medalists
gold medal	Wang Chuqin; Fan Zhendong	China
silver medal	Jang Woo-jin; Lim Jong-hoon	South Korea
bronze medal	Cho Dae-seong; Lee Sang-su	South Korea
bronze medal	Dimitrij Ovtcharov; Patrick Franziska	Germany

The men's doubles competition of the 2023 World Table Tennis Championships was held from 20 to 27 May 2023. The event was played as a straight knockout. All doubles matches were best of 5 games.

== Seeds ==
Doubles events had 16 seeded pairs. Seeding was based on the ITTF world ranking published on 16 May 2023.

1. (China) Wang Chuqin / (China) Fan Zhendong (champions)
2. (South Korea) Lim Jong-hoon / (South Korea) Jang Woo-jin (final)
3. (Japan) Shunsuke Togami / (Japan) Yukiya Uda (third round)
4. (Sweden) Mattias Falck / (Sweden) Kristian Karlsson (quarterfinals)
5. (Germany) Benedikt Duda / (Germany) Dang Qiu (first round)
6. (China) Lin Gaoyuan / (China) Lin Shidong (quarterfinals)
7. (South Korea) Cho Dae-seong / (South Korea) Lee Sang-su (semifinals)
8. (Argentina) Horacio Cifuentes / (Argentina) Gastón Alto (first round)
9. (Austria) Daniel Habesohn / (Austria) Robert Gardos (third round)
10. (Belgium) Cedric Nuytinck / (Poland) Jakub Dyjas (second round)
11. (Hong Kong) Ho Kwan Kit / (Hong Kong) Wong Chun Ting (second round)
12. (France) Félix Lebrun / (France) Alexis Lebrun (third round)
13. (Hungary) Nándor Ecseki / (Hungary) Ádám Szudi (quarterfinals)
14. (England) Paul Drinkhall / (England) Liam Pitchford (quarterfinals)
15. (Slovenia) Darko Jorgić / (Czech Republic) Tomáš Polanský (third round)
16. (Spain) Álvaro Robles / (Romania) Ovidiu Ionescu (third round)

== Draw ==
The draw took place on 18 May. Players of the same association were separated only in the first round of the draw.

=== Key ===
- r = Retired
- w/o = Walkover

=== Finals ===
Semifinals
1	(China) Wang Chuqin (China) Fan Zhendong	7	11	11	14
7	(South Korea) Lee Sang-su (South Korea) Cho Dae-seong	11	3	5	12
(Germany) Dimitrij Ovtcharov (Germany) Patrick Franziska	7	11	11	9	5
2	(South Korea) Jang Woo-jin (South Korea) Lim Jong-hoon	11	5	8	11	11

Final
1	(China) Wang Chuqin (China) Fan Zhendong	13	11	11
2	(South Korea) Jang Woo-jin (South Korea) Lim Jong-hoon	11	6	5

=== Top half ===
==== Section 1 ====
First round
(Kazakhstan) Gerassimenko (Kazakhstan) Kurmangaliyev	11	7	11	11
(Saudi Arabia) Alkhadrawi (Saudi Arabia) Bu Shulaybi	8	11	6	8
(Luxembourg) Glod (Luxembourg) Mladenovic	11	11	12
(Australia) Lum (Australia) Luu	5	4	10
(Chinese Taipei) Kao (Chinese Taipei) Chuang	11	0	7	7
12	(France) A. Lebrun (France) F. Lebrun	7	11	11	11
15	(Czech Republic) Polanský (Slovenia) Jorgić	_{w/o}
(Papua New Guinea) Sepa (Papua New Guinea) Loi
(Italy) Stoyanov (Italy) Bobocica	11	11	3	11
(Nigeria) Omotayo (Nigeria) Mati	7	4	11	6
(Slovakia) Pištej (Slovakia) Zelinka	11	11	11
(Ecuador) Miño (Ecuador) Riofrio	8	9	9
(Japan) Yoshimura (Japan) Harimoto	6	9	3
6	(China) Lin G. (China) Lin S.	11	11	11

Second round
1	(China) Wang (China) Fan	11	11	11
(Kazakhstan) Gerassimenko (Kazakhstan) Kurmangaliyev	6	2	8
(Luxembourg) Glod (Luxembourg) Mladenovic	8	6	6
12	(France) A. Lebrun (France) F. Lebrun	11	11	11
15	(Czech Republic) Polanský (Slovenia) Jorgić	11	11	11
(Italy) Stoyanov (Italy) Bobocica	7	9	5
(Slovakia) Pištej (Slovakia) Zelinka	7	5	3
6	(China) Lin G. (China) Lin S.	11	11	11

Third round
1	(China) Wang (China) Fan	11	11	8	9	11
12	(France) A. Lebrun (France) F. Lebrun	7	5	11	11	7
15	(Czech Republic) Polanský (Slovenia) Jorgić	4	3	3
6	(China) Lin G. (China) Lin S.	11	11	11

Quarterfinals
1	(China) Wang (China) Fan	11	8	13	11
6	(China) Lin G. (China) Lin S.	8	11	11	9

==== Section 2 ====
First round
7	(South Korea) Lee (South Korea) Cho	11	11	11
(Sweden) Källberg (Sweden) Persson	8	4	6
(Qatar) Al-Mohannadi (Qatar) Abdulwahhab	9	13	3	9
(Singapore) Beh (Singapore) Chew	11	11	11	11
(Hong Kong) Lam (Hong Kong) Ng	11	16	7	8	9
(Belgium) Lambiet (Belgium) Allegro	9	14	11	11	11
(Barbados) Maxwell (Barbados) Knight
16	(Spain) Robles (Romania) O. Ionescu	^{w/o}
10	(Poland) Dyjas (Belgium) Nuytinck	11	11	11
(Egypt) Saleh (Egypt) Assar	5	7	5
(Portugal) Geraldo (Portugal) Apolónia	11	3	6	15	10
(Poland) Kubik (Poland) Kulczycki	4	11	11	13	12
(Romania) E. Ionescu (Romania) Movileanu	11	11	11
(South Africa) Levy (South Africa) Beukes	5	8	5

Second round
7	(South Korea) Lee (South Korea) Cho	15	11	11
(Singapore) Beh (Singapore) Chew	13	5	5
(Belgium) Lambiet (Belgium) Allegro	7	6	11	6
16	(Spain) Robles (Romania) O. Ionescu	11	11	7	11
10	(Poland) Dyjas (Belgium) Nuytinck	9	11	11	6	8
(Poland) Kubik (Poland) Kulczycki	11	3	8	11	11
(Romania) E. Ionescu (Romania) Movileanu	5	11	11	13
4	(Sweden) Falck (Sweden) Karlsson	11	2	13	15

Third round
7	(South Korea) Lee (South Korea) Cho	13	16	11	11
16	(Spain) Robles (Romania) O. Ionescu	11	18	9	7
(Poland) Kubik (Poland) Kulczycki	5	4	11
4	(Sweden) Falck (Sweden) Karlsson	11	11	13

Quarterfinals
7	(South Korea) Lee (South Korea) Cho	11	11	8	11
4	(Sweden) Falck (Sweden) Karlsson	8	6	11	9

=== Bottom half ===
==== Section 3 ====
First round
3	(Japan) Uda (Japan) Togami	11	11	11
(United States) Liang (Mexico) Madrid	7	5	4
(Kazakhstan) Kurmambayev (Kazakhstan) Zholudev	6	5	10
(India) Shah (India) Desai	11	11	12
(Germany) Ovtcharov (Germany) Franziska	15	11	11
(Iran) Hodaei (Iran) Ahmadian	13	8	9
(England) Walker (England) Jarvis	11	7	3	5
11	(Hong Kong) Wong (Hong Kong) Ho	6	11	11	11
14	(England) Drinkhall (England) Pitchford	14	11	11
(Austria) Serdaroglu (Austria) Chen	12	6	8
(Chile) Burgos (Chile) Gomez	6	11	14	12	11
(Singapore) Quek (Singapore) Pang	11	7	12	14	7
(India) Achanta (India) Gnanasekaran	11	11	11
(Egypt) El-Beiali (Egypt) Shouman	6	9	6
(Denmark) Lind (Hungary) Majoros	11	11	8	11
8	(Argentina) Cifuentes (Argentina) Alto	7	8	11	9

Second round
3	(Japan) Uda (Japan) Togami	11	11	11
(India) Shah (India) Desai	4	3	8
(Germany) Ovtcharov (Germany) Franziska	14	7	7	11	11
11	(Hong Kong) Wong (Hong Kong) Ho	12	11	11	9	6
14	(England) Drinkhall (England) Pitchford	11	9	11	8	11
(Chile) Burgos (Chile) Gomez	8	11	9	11	9
(India) Achanta (India) Gnanasekaran	11	11	15
(Denmark) Lind (Hungary) Majoros	5	4	13

Third round
3	(Japan) Uda (Japan) Togami	7	11	12	6	8
(Germany) Ovtcharov (Germany) Franziska	11	6	10	11	11
14	(England) Drinkhall (England) Pitchford	9	11	14	12
(India) Achanta (India) Gnanasekaran	11	8	12	10

Quarterfinals
(Germany) Ovtcharov (Germany) Franziska	7	11	11	11
14	(England) Drinkhall (England) Pitchford	11	9	8	7

==== Section 4 ====
First round
5	(Germany) Qiu (Germany) Duda	7	7	11	11	9
(Iran) No. Alamian (Iran) Ni. Alamian	11	11	5	2	11
(Czech Republic) Martinko (Czech Republic) Širuček	11	8	10	11	9
(Puerto Rico) Afanador (Puerto Rico) González	3	11	12	6	11
(Brazil) Ishiy (Brazil) Jouti	11	11	11
(South Africa) Cogill (South Africa) Nathoo	3	4	8
(Nigeria) Aruna (Nigeria) Abiodun	14	11	11	4	3
13	(Hungary) Szudi (Hungary) Ecseki	16	5	8	11	11
9	(Austria) Habesohn (Austria) Gardos	12	11	12
(Canada) Ly (Canada) Martin	10	3	10
(Guyana) Franklin (Guyana) Britton
(Australia) Dixon (Australia) Lee	^{w/o}
(France) Akkuzu (France) Lebesson	5	11	11	11
(Chinese Taipei) Huang (Chinese Taipei) Yang	11	5	5	6

Second round
(Iran) No. Alamian (Iran) Ni. Alamian	9	11	13
(Puerto Rico) Afanador (Puerto Rico) González	11	13	15
(Brazil) Ishiy (Brazil) Jouti	6	7	7
13	(Hungary) Szudi (Hungary) Ecseki	11	11	11
9	(Austria) Habesohn (Austria) Gardos	11	11	11
(Australia) Dixon (Australia) Lee	8	6	5
(France) Akkuzu (France) Lebesson	11	11	8	9	10
2	(South Korea) Jang (South Korea) Lim	9	5	11	11	12

Third round
(Puerto Rico) Afanador (Puerto Rico) González	7	7	7
13	(Hungary) Szudi (Hungary) Ecseki	11	11	11
9	(Austria) Habesohn (Austria) Gardos	8	8	5
2	(South Korea) Jang (South Korea) Lim	11	11	11

Quarterfinals
13	(Hungary) Szudi (Hungary) Ecseki	4	10	7
2	(South Korea) Jang (South Korea) Lim	11	12	11
