= 2021 World Table Tennis Championships – Men's doubles =

Men's doubles at the 2021 World Table Tennis Championships
- Venue: George R. Brown Convention Center
- Location: Houston, United States
- Dates: 24–29 November
- Final score: 11–8, 15–13, 11–13, 12–10

Medalists
gold medal	Mattias Falck; Kristian Karlsson	Sweden
silver medal	Jang Woo-jin; Lim Jong-hoon	South Korea
bronze medal	Liang Jingkun; Lin Gaoyuan	China
bronze medal	Yukiya Uda; Shunsuke Togami	Japan

The men's doubles competition of the 2021 World Table Tennis Championships was held from 24 to 29 November 2021.

== Seeds ==
Seeding was based on the ITTF world ranking published on 16 November 2021. Ranking for doubles competitions is determined by combining a pair’s individual doubles ranking position to form a combined pair ranking.

1. (China) Liang Jingkun / (China) Lin Gaoyuan (semifinals)
2. (Japan) Yukiya Uda / (Japan) Shunsuke Togami (semifinals)
3. (Hungary) Ádám Szudi / (Hungary) Nándor Ecseki (second round)
4. (Spain) Álvaro Robles / (Romania) Ovidiu Ionescu (third round)
5. (Belgium) Cedric Nuytinck / (Poland) Jakub Dyjas (third round)
6. (Chinese Taipei) Chen Chien-an / (Chinese Taipei) Chuang Chih-yuan (third round)
7. (South Korea) An Jae-hyun / (South Korea) Cho Dae-seong (third round)
8. (Germany) Benedikt Duda / (Germany) Dang Qiu (quarterfinals)
9. (China) Fan Zhendong / (China) Wang Chuqin (quarterfinals)
10. (South Korea) Jang Woo-jin / (South Korea) Lim Jong-hoon (final)
11. (England) Paul Drinkhall / (England) Liam Pitchford (quarterfinals)
12. (Russia) Maksim Grebnev / (Russia) Lev Katsman (second round)
13. (India) Sharath Kamal / (India) Sathiyan Gnanasekaran (second round)
14. (Iran) Noshad Alamian / (Iran) Nima Alamian (second round)
15. (Argentina) Gastón Alto / (Argentina) Horacio Cifuentes (second round)
16. (Belgium) Martin Allegro / (Belgium) Florent Lambiet (third round)

== Draw ==
=== Finals ===
Semifinals
1	(China) Liang Jingkun (China) Lin Gaoyuan	10	8	8
(Sweden) Mattias Falck (Sweden) Kristian Karlsson	12	11	11
10	(South Korea) Jang Woo-jin (South Korea) Lim Jong-hoon	8	11	11	11
2	(Japan) Yukiya Uda (Japan) Shunsuke Togami	11	4	9	7

Final
(Sweden) Mattias Falck (Sweden) Kristian Karlsson	11	15	11	12
10	(South Korea) Jang Woo-jin (South Korea) Lim Jong-hoon	8	13	13	10

=== Top half ===
==== Section 1 ====
First round
(Portugal) Apolónia (Portugal) Monteiro	11	11	11
(Chile) Gómez (Chile) Lamadrid	3	9	3
(France) Lebesson (France) Cassin	11	11	11
(Austria) Chen (Austria) Serdaroglu	8	2	5
(Slovenia) Kožul (Slovenia) Jorgić	11	11	11
(Ivory Coast) Ali (Ivory Coast) Oba	7	9	8
(Hong Kong) Lam (Hong Kong) Ng	9	11	11	9	7
(Italy) Stoyanov (Italy) Bobocica	11	6	9	11	11

Second round
1	(China) Liang (China) Lin	11	9	11	11
(Portugal) Apolónia (Portugal) Monteiro	9	11	8	4
(France) Lebesson (France) Cassin	11	11	11
14	(Iran) No. Alamian (Iran) Ni. Alamian	7	8	3
16	(Belgium) Allegro (Belgium) Lambiet	11	11	17	6	11
(Slovenia) Kožul (Slovenia) Jorgić	9	9	19	11	8
(Italy) Stoyanov (Italy) Bobocica	11	13	5	6
8	(Germany) Duda (Germany) Qiu	11	11	11	11

Third round
1	(China) Liang (China) Lin	12	11	11
(France) Lebesson (France) Cassin	10	4	5
16	(Belgium) Allegro (Belgium) Lambiet	17	7	11	4
8	(Germany) Duda (Germany) Qiu	19	11	7	11

Quarterfinals
1	(China) Liang (China) Lin	11	11	12	8	11
8	(Germany) Duda (Germany) Qiu	8	4	14	11	9

==== Section 2 ====
First round
(Nigeria) Abiodun (Nigeria) Omotayo	8	11	11	5	11
(India) Anthony (India) Desai	11	9	9	11	8
(Brazil) Monteiro (Brazil) Tsuboi	5	9	10
(Sweden) Falck (Sweden) Karlsson	11	11	12
(Serbia) Karakašević (Slovakia) Pištej	7	12	5	6
(Germany) Boll (Germany) Franziska	11	10	11	11

Second round
7	(South Korea) An (South Korea) Cho	11	8	11	11
(Nigeria) Abiodun (Nigeria) Omotayo	9	11	1	6
(Sweden) Falck (Sweden) Karlsson	11	15	11
12	(Russia) Grebnev (Russia) Katsman	8	13	7
9	(China) Fan (China) Wang	11	13	11
(Germany) Boll (Germany) Franziska	6	11	3
(Egypt) Saleh (Egypt) Assar	11	7	4	11	4
4	(Spain) Robles (Romania) Ionescu	7	11	11	6	11

Third round
7	(South Korea) An (South Korea) Cho	7	11	11	6	6
(Sweden) Falck (Sweden) Karlsson	11	9	9	11	11
9	(China) Fan (China) Wang	11	8	11	11
4	(Spain) Robles (Romania) Ionescu	9	11	7	4

Quarterfinals
(Sweden) Falck (Sweden) Karlsson	8	11	11	11	11
9	(China) Fan (China) Wang	11	8	13	7	5

=== Bottom half ===
==== Section 3 ====
First round
(Romania) Sipos (Romania) Pletea	10	4	5
(Hong Kong) Ho (Hong Kong) Wong	12	11	11
(Sweden) Källberg (Sweden) Möregårdh	15	11	11	11
(Brazil) Jouti (Brazil) Ishiy	13	13	7	7
(Puerto Rico) Afanador (Puerto Rico) González	5	5	8
(Chinese Taipei) Feng (Chinese Taipei) Huang	11	11	11

Second round
3	(Hungary) Szudi (Hungary) Ecseki	5	12	7	9
(Hong Kong) Ho (Hong Kong) Wong	11	10	11	11
(Sweden) Källberg (Sweden) Möregårdh	11	9	13	11
13	(India) Achanta (India) Gnanasekaran	9	11	11	7
10	(South Korea) Jang (South Korea) Lim	11	11	12
(Mexico) Madrid (Mexico) Villa	4	7	10
(Chinese Taipei) Feng (Chinese Taipei) Huang	14	8	7
6	(Chinese Taipei) Chen (Chinese Taipei) Chuang	16	11	11

Third round
(Hong Kong) Ho (Hong Kong) Wong	11	8	14	9	12
(Sweden) Källberg (Sweden) Möregårdh	5	11	12	11	10
10	(South Korea) Jang (South Korea) Lim	11	11	11
6	(Chinese Taipei) Chen (Chinese Taipei) Chuang	4	6	5

Quarterfinals
(Hong Kong) Ho (Hong Kong) Wong	11	11	4	5
10	(South Korea) Jang (South Korea) Lim	4	13	11	11

==== Section 4 ====
First round
(Austria) Gardos (Austria) Habesohn	9	8	11	11	14
(Senegal) Diaw (Thailand) Tanviriyavechakul	11	11	7	9	12
(United States) Kumar (United States) Zhang	15	11	11
(Belarus) Khanin (Belarus) Platonov	13	8	8
(Belgium) Devos (Finland) Oláh	11	11	11
(Oman) Balushi (Oman) Alraisi	2	3	8

Second round
5	(Belgium) Nuytinck (Poland) Dyjas	13	11	5	11
(Austria) Gardos (Austria) Habesohn	11	4	11	9
(United States) Kumar (United States) Zhang	4	11	17	5
11	(England) Drinkhall (England) Pitchford	11	8	19	11
15	(Argentina) Alto (Argentina) Cifuentes	12	7	4
(Japan) Harimoto (Japan) Morizono	14	11	11
(Belgium) Devos (Finland) Oláh	5	8	6
2	(Japan) Uda (Japan) Togami	11	11	11

Third round
5	(Belgium) Nuytinck (Poland) Dyjas	9	12	6
11	(England) Drinkhall (England) Pitchford	11	14	11
(Japan) Harimoto (Japan) Morizono	13	12	11	4	4
2	(Japan) Uda (Japan) Togami	11	14	4	11	11

Quarterfinals
11	(England) Drinkhall (England) Pitchford	10	12	10	5
2	(Japan) Uda (Japan) Togami	12	10	12	11
