= 2023 World Table Tennis Championships =

2023 edition of the World Table Tennis Championships

- Venue: Durban International Convention Centre
- Location: Durban, KwaZulu-Natal, South Africa
- Dates: 20–28 May

The 2023 World Table Tennis Championships was the 57th edition of World Table Tennis Championships and held in Durban, South Africa.

It was the first such event set to be held in Africa since 1939 Championship held in Egypt.

== Bid ==
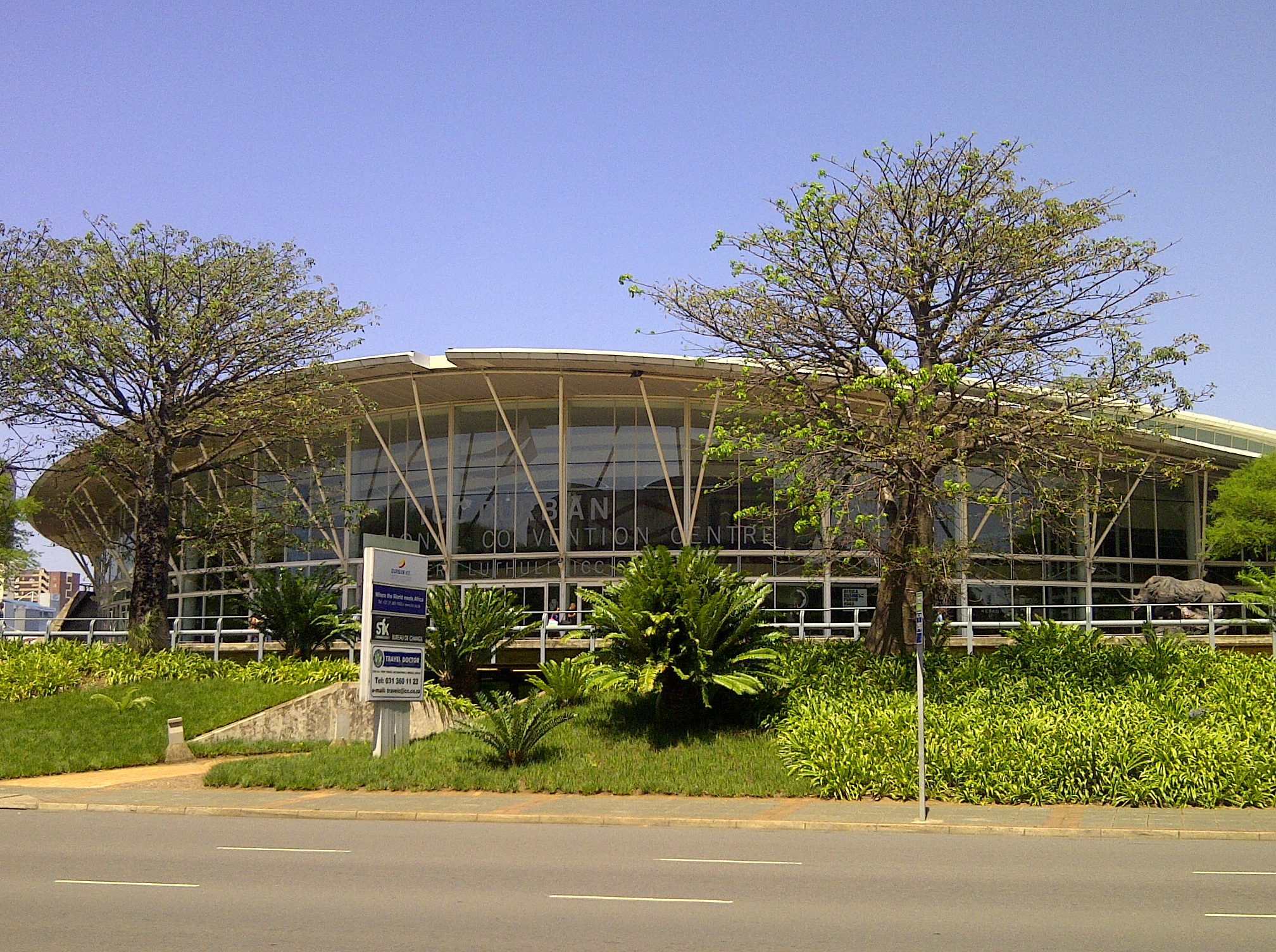
ICC Durban

South Africa was chosen as host after defeating Düsseldorf, Germany by 90 to 39 votes.

== Schedule ==
The tournament was played over nine days.

Rounds in draw
Finals

Date	20 May	21 May	22 May	23 May	24 May	25 May	26 May	27 May	28 May
Men's singles	R128		R64		R32	R16	QF	SF	F
Women's singles	R128		R64		R32	R16	QF	SF	F
Men's doubles	R64		R32	R16		QF	SF	F	
Women's doubles	R64		R32	R16		QF	SF	F	
Mixed doubles	R64		R32	R16	QF	SF	F		

== Medal summary ==
=== Medalists ===
Event	Gold	Silver	Bronze
Men's singles	(China) Fan Zhendong	(China) Wang Chuqin	(China) Liang Jingkun
Men's singles	(China) Fan Zhendong	(China) Wang Chuqin	(China) Ma Long
Women's singles	(China) Sun Yingsha	(China) Chen Meng	(Japan) Hina Hayata
Women's singles	(China) Sun Yingsha	(China) Chen Meng	(China) Chen Xingtong
Men's doubles	(China) Wang Chuqin (China) Fan Zhendong	(South Korea) Jang Woo-jin (South Korea) Lim Jong-hoon	(South Korea) Lee Sang-su (South Korea) Cho Dae-seong
Men's doubles	(China) Wang Chuqin (China) Fan Zhendong	(South Korea) Jang Woo-jin (South Korea) Lim Jong-hoon	(Germany) Dimitrij Ovtcharov (Germany) Patrick Franziska
Women's doubles	(China) Chen Meng (China) Wang Yidi	(South Korea) Shin Yu-bin (South Korea) Jeon Ji-hee	(China) Sun Yingsha (China) Wang Manyu
Women's doubles	(China) Chen Meng (China) Wang Yidi	(South Korea) Shin Yu-bin (South Korea) Jeon Ji-hee	(Japan) Miyu Nagasaki (Japan) Miyuu Kihara
Mixed doubles	(China) Wang Chuqin (China) Sun Yingsha	(Japan) Hina Hayata (Japan) Tomokazu Harimoto	(Hong Kong) Wong Chun-ting (Hong Kong) Doo Hoi Kem
Mixed doubles	(China) Wang Chuqin (China) Sun Yingsha	(Japan) Hina Hayata (Japan) Tomokazu Harimoto	(China) Kuai Man (China) Lin Shidong

=== Medal table ===
Rank	Nation	Gold	Silver	Bronze	Total
1	China (CHN)	5	2	5	12
2	South Korea (KOR)	0	2	1	3
3	Japan (JPN)	0	1	2	3
4	Germany (GER)	0	0	1	1
4	Hong Kong (HKG)	0	0	1	1
Totals (5 entries)		5	5	10	20

== Participating nations ==
A total of 306 players from 59 nations participated. China, Germany, Japan, and South Korea had a maximum of five players for each singles event, four players for each doubles event.

Nation	MS	WS	MD	WD	XD	Total number of players
Algeria	1	1	0	0	2	2
Argentina	3	2	2	0	4	5
Australia	4	1	4	0	2	5
Austria	3	3	4	2	4	7
Belgium	4	0	3	0	0	4
Brazil	3	2	2	2	4	5
Canada	2	2	2	2	2	6
Chile	1	2	2	2	4	4
China	5	5	4	4	4	12
Cameroon	0	1	0	0	0	1
Croatia	3	3	0	2	0	6
Czech Republic	2	2	3	3	0	7
Denmark	2	0	1	0	0	2
Ecuador	1	0	2	0	0	2
Egypt	4	4	4	4	4	10
England	4	1	4	1	2	5
Spain	1	2	1	1	2	3
Finland	1	0	0	0	0	1
France	4	5	4	4	4	10
Germany	5	5	4	4	4	10
Greece	1	1	0	0	0	2
Hong Kong	3	5	4	4	4	9
Hungary	2	4	3	2	2	7
India	4	4	4	4	4	11
Iran	4	0	4	0	0	4
Italy	2	4	2	4	4	7
Japan	5	5	4	4	4	10
Kazakhstan	1	3	4	2	4	8
South Korea	5	5	4	4	4	12
Saudi Arabia	1	0	2	0	0	2
Luxembourg	0	2	2	2	4	4
Mexico	1	3	1	2	2	4
Mauritius	0	1	0	0	0	1
New Caledonia	1	0	0	0	0	1
Nigeria	4	3	4	4	2	8
New Zealand	2	0	0	0	0	2
Paraguay	1	0	0	0	0	1
Poland	2	2	3	2	4	7
Portugal	4	2	2	2	2	6
Puerto Rico	2	2	2	2	2	4
French Polynesia	1	0	0	0	0	1
Qatar	0	0	2	0	0	2
Romania	3	4	3	4	4	7
South Africa	3	3	4	4	4	8
Senegal	1	0	0	0	0	1
Singapore	3	4	4	4	4	9
Slovenia	2	1	1	2	0	4
Serbia	0	3	0	0	2	4
Switzerland	0	1	0	0	0	1
Slovakia	2	3	2	3	4	6
Sweden	5	3	4	2	2	8
Thailand	0	3	0	2	0	3
Chinese Taipei	5	4	4	4	4	10
Turkey	0	2	0	4	4	6
Ukraine	2	3	0	0	2	6
United States	1	3	1	4	4	8
Uzbekistan	0	0	0	2	0	2
Wales	0	1	0	0	0	1
Zambia	0	0	0	2	0	2
Total	126	125	116	106	118	306
Nations	48	45	40	37	36	59
