= Table tennis at the 2022 Asian Games – Mixed doubles =

Mixed doubles at the 2022 Asian Games
- Venue: Gongshu Canal Sports Park Gymnasium
- Dates: 25–30 September 2023
- Competitors: 70 from 18 nations

Medalists
gold medal	Wang Chuqin; Sun Yingsha	China
silver medal	Lin Gaoyuan; Wang Yidi	China
bronze medal	Lim Jong-hoon; Shin Yu-bin	South Korea
bronze medal	Jang Woo-jin; Jeon Ji-hee	South Korea

The mixed doubles table tennis event was part of the table tennis programme and took place between 25 and 30 September 2023, at the Gongshu Canal Sports Park Gymnasium.

== Schedule ==
All times are China Standard Time (UTC+08:00)

Date	Time	Event
Monday, 25 September 2023	10:00	Round of 64
Wednesday, 27 September 2023	17:45	Round of 32
Thursday, 28 September 2023	10:00	Round of 16
Thursday, 28 September 2023	19:10	Quarterfinals
Friday, 29 September 2023	19:10	Semifinals
Saturday, 30 September 2023	20:00	Final

== Results ==
Legend

- WO — Won by walkover

=== Finals ===
Quarterfinals
1	Wang Chuqin (CHN); Sun Yingsha (CHN)	11	11	11
5	Wong Chun Ting (HKG); Doo Hoi Kem (HKG)	2	7	7
Clarence Chew (SGP); Zeng Jian (SGP)	4	3	5
3	Lim Jong-hoon (KOR); Shin Yu-bin (KOR)	11	11	11
Phakpoom Sanguansin (THA); Orawan Paranang (THA)	9	5	4
6	Jang Woo-jin (KOR); Jeon Ji-hee (KOR)	11	11	11
7	Lin Gaoyuan (CHN); Wang Yidi (CHN)	11	7	11	11
2	Tomokazu Harimoto (JPN); Hina Hayata (JPN)	6	11	9	7

Semifinals
1	Wang Chuqin (CHN); Sun Yingsha (CHN)	11	11	11	11
3	Lim Jong-hoon (KOR); Shin Yu-bin (KOR)	6	6	8	8
6	Jang Woo-jin (KOR); Jeon Ji-hee (KOR)	9	4	11	6	7
7	Lin Gaoyuan (CHN); Wang Yidi (CHN)	11	11	8	11	11

Final
1	Wang Chuqin (CHN); Sun Yingsha (CHN)	11	11	13	11	11
7	Lin Gaoyuan (CHN); Wang Yidi (CHN)	6	8	15	4	9

=== Top half ===
==== Section 1 ====
Round of 64	Round of 32							Round of 16
	1	Wang Chuqin (CHN); Sun Yingsha (CHN)	11	11	11
		Alyas Alyassi (BRN); Amruta Phadke (BRN)	3	5	6
								1	Wang Chuqin (CHN); Sun Yingsha (CHN)	11	11	11
									Moosa Munsif Ahmed (MDV); Aishath Rafa Nazim (MDV)	2	3	3
		Muhammad Shah Khan (PAK); Haiqa Hassan (PAK)	5	11	16	7	9
		Moosa Munsif Ahmed (MDV); Aishath Rafa Nazim (MDV)	11	7	14	11	11

==== Section 2 ====
Round of 64	Round of 32					Round of 16
		Aidos Kenzhigulov (KAZ); Zauresh Akasheva (KAZ)	9	7	4
		Ri Jong-sik (PRK); Pyon Song-gyong (PRK)	11	11	11
							Ri Jong-sik (PRK); Pyon Song-gyong (PRK)	9	8	11	10
						5	Wong Chun Ting (HKG); Doo Hoi Kem (HKG)	11	11	6	12
		He Chon Fai (MAC); Cheong Chi Hun (MAC)	4	5	5
	5	Wong Chun Ting (HKG); Doo Hoi Kem (HKG)	11	11	11

==== Section 3 ====
Round of 64					Round of 32						Round of 16
					8	Sathiyan Gnanasekaran (IND); Manika Batra (IND)	10	11	11	11
						Napat Thanmathikom (THA); Suthasini Sawettabut (THA)	12	8	3	8
											8	Sathiyan Gnanasekaran (IND); Manika Batra (IND)	11	11	11	10	3
Đinh Anh Hoàng (VIE); Trần Mai Ngọc (VIE)	11	5	8	6								Clarence Chew (SGP); Zeng Jian (SGP)	7	9	13	12	11
Clarence Chew (SGP); Zeng Jian (SGP)	9	11	11	11		Clarence Chew (SGP); Zeng Jian (SGP)	11	11	11
						Ankhbayaryn Bilgüün (MGL); Bat-Erdeniin Egshiglen (MGL)	7	4	3

==== Section 4 ====
Round of 64	Round of 32					Round of 16
		Huang Yan-cheng (TPE); Cheng I-ching (TPE)
		Shunsuke Togami (JPN); Miyuu Kihara (JPN)	W	O
							Shunsuke Togami (JPN); Miyuu Kihara (JPN)	10	11	9	9
						3	Lim Jong-hoon (KOR); Shin Yu-bin (KOR)	12	6	11	11
		Sanyog Kapali (NEP); Nabita Shrestha (NEP)	6	3	1
	3	Lim Jong-hoon (KOR); Shin Yu-bin (KOR)	11	11	11

=== Bottom half ===
==== Section 5 ====
Round of 64	Round of 32					Round of 16
	4	Lin Yun-ju (TPE); Chen Szu-yu (TPE)	9	9	9
		Phakpoom Sanguansin (THA); Orawan Paranang (THA)	11	11	11
						Phakpoom Sanguansin (THA); Orawan Paranang (THA)	11	11	12
						Harmeet Desai (IND); Sreeja Akula (IND)	4	6	10
		Cheong Chi Cheng (MAC); Seak Hui Li (MAC)	10	7	7
		Harmeet Desai (IND); Sreeja Akula (IND)	12	11	11

==== Section 6 ====
Round of 64				Round of 32					Round of 16
					Rubin Maharjan (NEP); Sikka Suwal Shrestha (NEP)	2	2	3
Mohamed Shaffan Ismail (MDV); Laisa Fathuhulla Ismail (MDV)	1	2	7		Ham Yu-song (PRK); Kim Kum-yong (PRK)	11	11	11
Ham Yu-song (PRK); Kim Kum-yong (PRK)	11	11	11							Ham Yu-song (PRK); Kim Kum-yong (PRK)	11	5	8	11	11
									6	Jang Woo-jin (KOR); Jeon Ji-hee (KOR)	6	11	11	6	13
					Alan Kurmangaliyev (KAZ); Sarvinoz Mirkadirova (KAZ)	3	7	7
				6	Jang Woo-jin (KOR); Jeon Ji-hee (KOR)	11	11	11

==== Section 7 ====
Round of 64				Round of 32					Round of 16
				7	Lin Gaoyuan (CHN); Wang Yidi (CHN)	11	11	11
					Lê Đình Đức (VIE); Nguyễn Thị Nga (VIE)	2	8	6
									7	Lin Gaoyuan (CHN); Wang Yidi (CHN)	10	11	11	9	11
Ubaydullo Sultonov (TJK); Sumayai Amiri (TJK)	8	6	5							Koen Pang (SGP); Wong Xin Ru (SGP)	12	9	7	11	7
Koen Pang (SGP); Wong Xin Ru (SGP)	11	11	11		Koen Pang (SGP); Wong Xin Ru (SGP)	11	11	11
					Faizan Zahoor (PAK); Hoor Fawad (PAK)	5	3	6

==== Section 8 ====
Round of 64	Round of 32					Round of 16
		Rashed Khaled Sanad (BRN); Maryam Al-Aali (BRN)	9	5	6
		Ho Kwan Kit (HKG); Lee Ho Ching (HKG)	11	11	11
							Ho Kwan Kit (HKG); Lee Ho Ching (HKG)	11	8	13	8	7
						2	Tomokazu Harimoto (JPN); Hina Hayata (JPN)	9	11	11	11	11
		Gankhuyagiin Ser-Od (MGL); Batbayaryn Doljinzuu (MGL)	7	3	4
	2	Tomokazu Harimoto (JPN); Hina Hayata (JPN)	11	11	11
