= ITTF World Ranking =

Ranking system for table tennis players

The International Table Tennis Federation (ITTF) World Ranking is a ranking system for table tennis players. Individual and doubles rankings are published every Tuesday, while team rankings are published on the first Monday of each month.

World No. 1 in Each Discipline; 16 November, 2026
Discipline	Country	Player(s)	Points
Men's Singles	Japan	Sora Matsushima	7,598
Women's Singles	China	Wang Manyu	9,265
Men's Doubles	France	Felix Lebrun; Alexis Lebrun	6,208
Women's Doubles	Japan	Hina Hayata Miwa Harimoto	7,750
Mixed Doubles	South Korea	Lim Jong-hoon; Shin Yu-bin	8,325

== Individual World Ranking Rules ==
Starting in 2021, the ITTF implemented new ranking rules. Points are awarded based on a player's final performance in recognized tournaments, with details as follows:

- Points are awarded according to the tournament level and final placement, see the table below;
- The highest points from 8 tournaments are summed;
- Points from continental events are limited to a maximum of 1 event;
- The validity period for each points entry is generally one year.

Event	Placement							
Event	Champion	Runner-up	Semi-final	Quarter-final	Last 16	Last 32	Last 64	Last 128
Olympic Games	2000	1400	700	350	175	90	45	20
World Championships	2000	1400	700	350	175	90	45	10
WTT Grand Smash	2000	1400	700	350	175	90	20	
WTT Finals	1500	1050	525	265	100			
World Cup	1500	1050	525	265	130			
WTT Champions	1000	700	350	175	90	15		
WTT Star Contender	600	420	210	105	55	25	5	
Continental Events	500	350	175	90	10/45			
WTT Contender	400	280	140	70	35	4		
WTT Feeder	125	90	45	25	15	2/8	-/2	

== Current Rankings ==
The ITTF publishes the latest world rankings every Tuesday. As of 29 June 2026, the current world rankings are as follows:

=== Men's Singles ===
ITTF World Ranking (Men's Singles) 14 September 2026
Rank	Change	Country/Region	Player	Points
1	Steady	China	Wang Chuqin	8,157
2	Steady	France	Félix Lebrun	7,479
3	Steady	Japan	Sora Matsushima	6,930
4	Steady	Japan	Tomokazu Harimoto	6,363
5	Steady	Sweden	Truls Möregårdh	5,805
6	Steady	Chinese Taipei	Lin Yun-ju	4,335
7	Steady	Brazil	Hugo Calderano	4,240
8	Steady	China	Lin Shidong	3,842
9	Steady	France	Alexis Lebrun	3,600
10	Steady	South Korea	Jang Woo-jin	3,181
11	Steady	Germany	Qiu Dang	3,043
12	Steady	Slovenia	Darko Jorgić	2,930
13	▲1	Japan	Shunsuke Togami	2,538
14	▼1	Denmark	Anders Lind	2,497
15	Steady	China	Wen Ruibo	2,435
16	Steady	Authorised Neutral Athletes	Vladimir Sidorenko	2,115
17	Steady	Japan	Hiroto Shinozuka	2,020
18	▲6	China	Zhou Qihao	1,925
19	▲1	France	Thibault Poret	1,925
20	▲3	Germany	Dimitrij Ovtcharov	1,895

=== Women's Singles ===
ITTF World Ranking (Women's Singles) 6 July 2026
Rank	Change	Country/Region	Player	Points
1	Steady	China	Sun Yingsha	11,350
2	Steady	China	Wang Manyu	8,865
3	Steady	Macau	Zhu Yuling	5,410
4	Steady	Japan	Miwa Harimoto	5,389
5	▲2	China	Kuai Man	5,363
6	▼1	China	Chen Xingtong	4,710
7	▲1	China	Wang Yidi	4,497
8	▼2	China	Chen Yi	4,350
9	▲1	Japan	Hina Hayata	4,070
10	▼1	Germany	Sabine Winter	3,785
11	Steady	South Korea	Shin Yu-bin	3,490
12	Steady	Japan	Satsuki Odo	3,250
13	Steady	Japan	Honoka Hashimoto	3,014
14	Steady	China	Shi Xunyao	2,660
15	Steady	Japan	Mima Ito	2,650
16	Steady	South Korea	Joo Cheon-hui	2,565
17	▲4	Japan	Hitomi Sato	2,065
18	▲1	Germany	Han Ying	2,055
19	▼2	Puerto Rico	Adriana Díaz	1,902
20	▼2	Japan	Miyu Nagasaki	1,875

=== Men's Doubles ===
ITTF World Ranking (Men's Doubles) 29 June, 2026
Rank	Change	Country/Region	Players	Points
1	Steady	China	Lin Shidong	4,110
1	Steady	China	Huang Youzheng	4,110
2	Steady	France	Alexis Lebrun	4,048
2	Steady	France	Félix Lebrun	4,048
3	Steady	Hong Kong, China	Wong Chun Ting	3,438
3	Steady	Hong Kong, China	Chan Baldwin	3,438
4	Steady	India	Manav Thakkar	3,160
4	Steady	India	Manush Shah	3,160
5	Steady	South Korea	Lim Jong-hoon	2,375
5	Steady	South Korea	Ahn Jae-hyun	2,375
6	Steady	South Korea	Lim Jong-hoon	2,090
6	Steady	South Korea	Oh Jun-sung	2,090
7	Steady	Singapore	Pang Yew En Koen	2,050
7	Steady	Singapore	Izaac Quek Yong	2,050
8	Steady	China	Wang Chuqin	2,000
8	Steady	China	Lin Shidong	2,000
9	Steady	France	Florian Bourrassaud	1,665
9	Steady	France	Esteban Dorr	1,665
10	Steady	Germany	Dang Qiu	1,660
10	Steady	Germany	Benedikt Duda	1,660

=== Women's Doubles ===
ITTF World Ranking (Women's Doubles) 29 June 2026
Rank	Change	Country/Region	Players	Points
1	▲1	China	Wang Manyu	3,400
1	▲1	China	Sun Yingsha	3,400
2	▼1	South Korea	Ryu Han-na	3,335
2	▼1	South Korea	Kim Na-young	3,335
3	Steady	Japan	Satsuki Odo	2,810
3	Steady	Japan	Miwa Harimoto	2,810
4	Steady	Japan	Hina Hayata	2,600
4	Steady	Japan	Miwa Harimoto	2,600
5	Steady	South Korea	Shin Yu-bin	2,450
5	Steady	Japan	Miyu Nagasaki	2,450
6	Steady	Japan	Satsuki Odo	2,024
6	Steady	Japan	Sakura Yokoi	2,024
7	Steady	China	Wang Manyu	2,000
7	Steady	China	Kuai Man	2,000
8	Steady	China	Wang Yidi	2,000
8	Steady	China	Kuai Man	2,000
9	Steady	China	Chen Yi	1,620
9	Steady	China	Kuai Man	1,620
10	Steady	China	Qin Yuxuan	1,435
10	Steady	China	Zong Geman	1,435

=== Mixed Doubles ===
ITTF World Ranking (Mixed Doubles) 6 July 2026
Rank	Change	Country/Region	Players	Points
1	Steady	South Korea	Lim Jong-hoon	8,380
1	Steady	South Korea	Shin Yu-bin	8,380
2	▲1	Brazil	Hugo Calderano	5,220
2	▲1	Brazil	Bruna Takahashi	5,220
3	▲2	China	Wang Chuqin	4,961
3	▲2	China	Sun Yingsha	4,961
4	▼2	China	Kuai Man	4,923
4	▼2	China	Lin Shidong	4,923
5	▼1	Hong Kong, China	Wong Chun Ting	3,575
5	▼1	Hong Kong, China	Doo Hoi Kem	3,575
6	Steady	India	Diya Parag Chitale	3,050
6	Steady	India	Manush Utpalbhai Shah	3,050
7	Steady	China	Chen Yi	2,320
7	Steady	China	Huang Youzheng	2,320
8	Steady	Spain	Álvaro Robles	2,270
8	Steady	Spain	Xiao Maria	2,270
9	Steady	Chinese Taipei	Lin Yun-ju	2,098
9	Steady	Chinese Taipei	Cheng I-ching	2,098
10	Steady	Japan	Sora Matsushima	2,025
10	Steady	Japan	Miwa Harimoto	2,025

== Team Rankings ==
The Team World Ranking serves as the basis for seeding in ITTF and WTT team events and is published on the first Monday of each month. The rules are as follows:

- Points are awarded based on the team event level and final placement;
- The individual ranking points of the top 3 players from an association are summed. This total score is used for ranking, and the association receives one corresponding Team Individual Ranking Points entry based on its position;
- The highest points from 3 team events and the Team Individual Ranking Points are summed;
- Points from continental events are limited to a maximum of 1 event;
- The validity period for each points entry generally lasts until the next edition of the same type of event.

=== Men's Team ===
ITTF World Ranking (Men's Team) June 2026
Rank	Change	Country/Region	Points
1	Steady	China	6,350
3	Steady	France	4,904
4	Steady	Sweden	4882
2	Steady	Japan	4,914
5	Steady	Chinese Taipei	3,924
6	Steady	Germany	3,908
7	Steady	South Korea	3,632
8	Steady	Brazil	3,602
9	Steady	Denmark	2,766
10	Steady	Croatia	2,478

=== Women's Team ===
ITTF World Ranking (Women's Team) June 2026
Rank	Change	Country/Region	Points
1	Steady	China	6,500
2	Steady	Japan	5,536
3	Steady	South Korea	4,610
4	Steady	Germany	4,404
5	Steady	Romania	3,902
6	Steady	France	3,594
7	Steady	Chinese Taipei	3,090
8	Steady	Egypt	3,066
9	Steady	Hong Kong, China	3,004
10	Steady	United States	2,900

== See also ==
- International Table Tennis Federation (ITTF)
- World Table Tennis (WTT)
- ITTF World Ranking
