= Wang Chuqin =

Chinese table tennis player

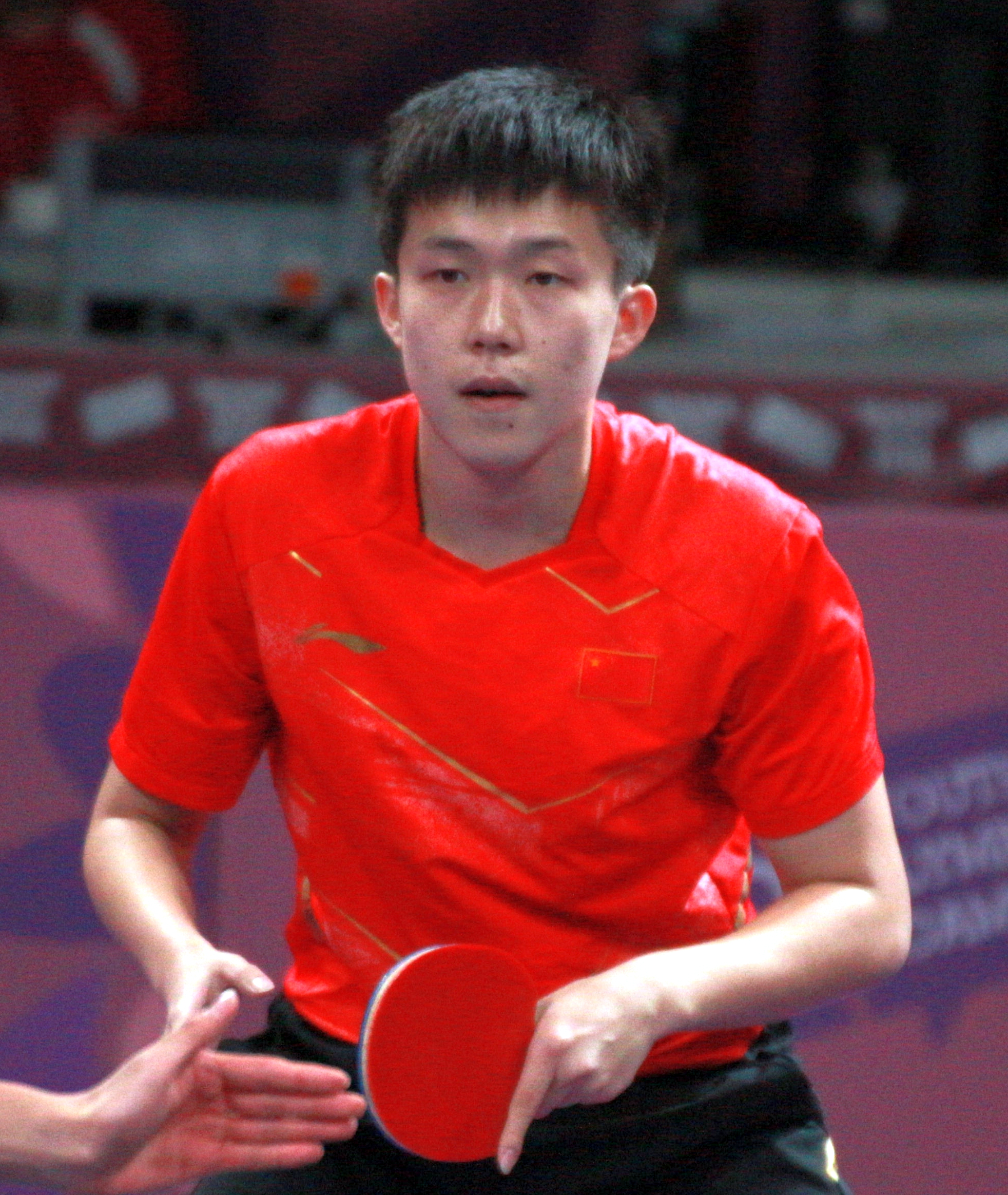
- Wang at the 2018 Youth Olympics

Personal information
- Nicknames: Lion Heart; Datou (big head)
- Born: 11 May 2000 (age 26) Jilin City, China
- Height: 1.82 m (6 ft 0 in)

Sport
- Sport: Table tennis
- Playing style: Left-handed, shakehand grip
- Equipment: DHS W968, DHS Hurricane 3 National Blue Sponge (FH, black), DHS Hurricane 8 (BH, Red)
- Highest ranking: 1 (4 July 2023)
- Current ranking: 5 (12 October 2026)
Medal record
Men's table tennis
Representing China
Event	1st	2nd	3rd
Olympic Games	2	0	0
World Championships	10	1	0
World Cup	4	0	2
Asian Games	6	3	0
Asian Championships	4	2	0
Asian Cup	2	0	0
WTT Finals	3	1	3
WTT Grand Smash	16	1	3
WTT Champions	4	2	2
Total	51	10	10
Olympic Games
Gold medal – first place	2024 Paris	Team
Gold medal – first place	2024 Paris	Mixed doubles
World Championships
Gold medal – first place	2018 Halmstad	Team
Gold medal – first place	2019 Budapest	Doubles
Gold medal – first place	2021 Houston	Mixed doubles
Gold medal – first place	2022 Chengdu	Team
Gold medal – first place	2023 Durban	Doubles
Gold medal – first place	2023 Durban	Mixed doubles
Gold medal – first place	2024 Busan	Team
Gold medal – first place	2025 Doha	Singles
Gold medal – first place	2025 Doha	Mixed doubles
Gold medal – first place	2026 London	Team
Silver medal – second place	2023 Durban	Singles
World Cup
Gold medal – first place	2023 Chengdu	Mixed team
Gold medal – first place	2024 Chengdu	Mixed team
Gold medal – first place	2025 Chengdu	Mixed team
Gold medal – first place	2026 Macao	Singles
Bronze medal – third place	2024 Macao	Singles
Bronze medal – third place	2025 Macao	Singles
WTT Grand Smash
Gold medal – first place	2022 Singapore	Doubles
Gold medal – first place	2022 Singapore	Mixed doubles
Gold medal – first place	2023 Singapore	Doubles
Gold medal – first place	2023 Singapore	Mixed doubles
Gold medal – first place	2024 Singapore	Singles
Gold medal – first place	2024 Singapore	Mixed doubles
Gold medal – first place	2024 Saudi	Singles
Gold medal – first place	2024 Saudi	Doubles
Gold medal – first place	2024 Saudi	Mixed doubles
Gold medal – first place	2024 China	Doubles
Gold medal – first place	2025 Singapore	Doubles
Gold medal – first place	2025 United States	Singles
Gold medal – first place	2025 China	Singles
Gold medal – first place	2025 China	Doubles
Gold medal – first place	2025 China	Mixed doubles
Gold medal – first place	2026 Singapore	Singles
Silver medal – second place	2024 Singapore	Doubles
Bronze medal – third place	2023 Singapore	Singles
Bronze medal – third place	2025 Singapore	Singles
Bronze medal – third place	2025 United States	Doubles
WTT Champions
Gold medal – first place	2022 Macao	Singles
Gold medal – first place	2023 Macao	Singles
Gold medal – first place	2025 Chongqing	Singles
Gold medal – first place	2025 Macao	Singles
Silver medal – second place	2024 Chongqing	Singles
Silver medal – second place	2025 Yokohama	Singles
Bronze medal – third place	2023 Frankfurt	Singles
Bronze medal – third place	2024 Macao	Singles
WTT Finals
Gold medal – first place	2022 Xinxiang	Singles
Gold medal – first place	2023 Doha	Singles
Gold medal – first place	2024 Fukuoka	Singles
Silver medal – second place	2025 Hong Kong	Mixed doubles
Bronze medal – third place	2021 Singapore	Singles
Bronze medal – third place	2023 Doha	Doubles
Bronze medal – third place	2025 Hong Kong	Singles
Asian Games
Gold medal – first place	2018 Jakarta-Palembang	Mixed doubles
Gold medal – first place	2018 Jakarta-Palembang	Team
Gold medal – first place	2022 Hangzhou	Singles
Gold medal – first place	2022 Hangzhou	Doubles
Gold medal – first place	2022 Hangzhou	Mixed doubles
Gold medal – first place	2022 Hangzhou	Team
Silver medal – second place	2026 Aichi-Nagoya	Singles
Silver medal – second place	2026 Aichi-Nagoya	Mixed doubles
Silver medal – second place	2026 Aichi-Nagoya	Team
Asian Championships
Gold medal – first place	2019 Yogyakarta	Team
Gold medal – first place	2023 Pyeongchang	Team
Gold medal – first place	2024 Astana	Team
Gold medal – first place	2025 Bhubaneswar	Team
Silver medal – second place	2019 Yogyakarta	Mixed doubles
Silver medal – second place	2023 Pyeongchang	Doubles
Asian Cup
Gold medal – first place	2025 Shenzhen	Singles
Gold medal – first place	2026 Haikou	Singles
Youth Olympic Games
Gold medal – first place	2018 Buenos Aires	Singles
Gold medal – first place	2018 Buenos Aires	Mixed team
World Junior Championships
Gold medal – first place	2014 Shanghai	Mixed doubles
Gold medal – first place	2015 Vendée	Doubles
Gold medal – first place	2017 Riva del Garda	Doubles
Silver medal – second place	2015 Vendée	Mixed doubles
Bronze medal – third place	2014 Shanghai	Doubles
Bronze medal – third place	2015 Vendée	Singles
Bronze medal – third place	2017 Riva del Garda	Mixed doubles
Bronze medal – third place	2017 Riva del Garda	Singles

Wang Chuqin (/wʌŋtʃuːtʃin/; simplified Chinese: 王楚钦; traditional Chinese: 王楚欽; pinyin: Wáng Chǔqīn, pronounced [uǎŋ ʈʂʰùtɕʰín]; born 11 May 2000) is a Chinese professional table tennis player and World Champion. He is currently the captain of the Chinese men's table tennis team.

Wang won gold in the men's singles and mixed team with Sun Yingsha at the 2018 Youth Olympic Games in Buenos Aires, Argentina.

Wang is the reigning Olympic gold medallist in mixed doubles with Sun Yingsha, and in the team event with Ma Long and Fan Zhendong. He won the men's singles title at the WTT Finals in 2022, 2023, and 2024. At the 2025 ITTF World Table Tennis Championships Finals in Doha, he was the gold medallist in men's singles and in mixed doubles with Sun Yingsha. He won the men's single title at the 2026 ITTF World Cup in Macao.

== Career ==
=== 2013 ===
On 1 September 2013, in the men's junior (under 15 years old) team final of the 19th Asian Youth Championships, the Chinese team composed of Wang, Xue Fei and Liu Dingshuo defeated the Chinese Taipei team 3-1 to win the championship.

=== 2014 ===
In December 2014, in the final of the 2014 World Table Tennis Junior Championships, Wang Chuqin/Chen Xingtong reversed the situation of being behind 1-2 and 2-3 to defeat Lü Xiang/Wang Manyu 4-3 and won the championship;The Chinese team consisting of Wang Chuqin, Yu Ziyang, Liang Jingkun and Lu Xiang defeated the Japanese team and won the men's team championship.

=== 2015 ===
In December 2015, Wang Chuqin was promoted to the Chinese table tennis team. In December, Wang Chuqin and Xue Fei partnered to win the men's doubles championship at the 2015 World Youth Championship.

=== 2016 ===
On 31 December 2016, in the 2016 China Table Tennis Super League men's team final, Wang Chuqin lost to Fan Zhendong 2-3 in the fourth game, and finally lost 1-3 to win the runner-up.

=== 2017 ===
On 6 July 2017, at the Asian Youth Table Tennis Championships, Wang Chuqin won three gold medals in men's team, men's singles and mixed doubles. On 6 September, in the men's singles table tennis semi-finals of the 13th National Games, Wang Chuqin lost 1-4 to Ma Long and was eliminated in the finals.

On 3 December, Wang Chuqin partnered with Xue Fei and successfully defended the World Youth Championship men's doubles championship.

=== 2018 ===
On 6 August, Wang Chuqin was selected into the Chinese sports delegation for the 18th Asian Games. On 28 August, at the 2018 Jakarta Asian Games, in the men's table tennis team final, the Chinese team composed of Wang Chuqin, Lin Gaoyuan and Fan Zhendong defeated the South Korean team composed of Lee Sang-soo, Zheng Rongzhi and Zhang Yuzhen 3-0, achieving seven consecutive championships. On 30 August, in the mixed doubles final, Wang Chuqin/Sun Yingsha lost the first two games but then won four games in a row, defeating Lin Gaoyuan/Wang Manyu 4-2 to win the championship.

On 10 September, the National Table Tennis Championships, the men's team won the National Table Tennis Championships again after six years.

=== 2019 ===
In April 2019, Wang Chuqin partnered with Ma Long and defeated Ionescu/Robles 4-1 to win the men's doubles championship at the 2019 World Table Tennis Championships in Budapest. In October, at the ITTF Swedish Open, Wang Chuqin defeated Lin Gaoyuan 4-0 and won the open singles championship for the first time.On 21 September, at the Asian Table Tennis Championships, in the mixed doubles final, Wang Chuqin/Sun Yingsha lost to Xu Xin/Liu Shiwen 1-3 and won the runner-up

=== 2020 ===
On 7 March 2020, at the ITTF Qatar Open, in the mixed doubles final, Wang Chuqin/Sun Yingsha lost 1-3 to Mizutani Jun/Ito Mima and missed the championship. On 7 October, in the mixed doubles final of the Table Tennis National Championships, Wang Chuqin/Wang Manyu defeated Xu Xin/Sun Yingsha 4-1 to win the championship. 29 November, WTT Macau International Table Tennis Tournament, men's singles runner-up

=== 2021 ===
In May, Wang was selected as an alternate for the Chinese National Team at the Tokyo Olympics. Wang reached the semi-finals of the second leg of the Chinese Olympic Scrimmage before losing to eventual champion Fan Zhendong 4–2.

In September, Wang lost to Liu Dingshuo in the semi-finals of the China National Games and then lost to Liang Jingkun in the bronze-medal match.

On 25 September, in the men's doubles semi-finals of the National Games, Wang Chuqin and Ma Long swept Xu Yingbin and Cao Wei of Heilongjiang team 4-0 and advanced to the finals. On the same day, in the men's doubles final of the National Games, Wang Chuqin and Ma Long defeated Yan An and Xu Chenhao 4-0 to win the championship.

In November 2021, Wang paired with Sun Yingsha and both won the gold medal in the mixed double finals at the 2021 World Table Tennis Championships.

=== 2022 ===
In October 2022, Wang defeated Fan Zhendong in the final at the WTT Champions Macao.

At the WTT Cup Finals, Wang defeated Dang Qiu in the quarterfinals, before going on to win against Ma Long in the semi-finals and Tomokazu Harimoto in the final.

In February, he qualified for the WTT Singapore Grand Slam singles main draw. On 4 March, in the WTT mixed doubles final, Wang Chuqin/Chen Xingtong swept India's Takkar/Kamas 3-0 to win the championship. On 14 March, in the 2022 WTT Singapore Grand Slam mixed doubles quarterfinals, Wang Chuqin/Sun Yingsha defeated Malaysia's Ionescu/Szoczyk 3-0 (11-4, 11-8, 11-9). On 15 March 2022 WTT, Wang Chuqin/Fan Zhendong won 3-1 and entered the men's doubles semi-finals. On 16 March, in the WTT Singapore Grand Slam men's doubles semi-finals, the Chinese pair Fan Zhendong/Wang Chuqin defeated the German pair Qiu Dang/Duda with a total score of 3-1, and Fan Zhendong and Wang Chuqin advanced to the men's doubles final. On 18 March, in the men's doubles final of the 2022 WTT Singapore Grand Slam, Fan Zhendong/Wang Chuqin defeated Japan's Uda Yukiya/Togami Hayasuke 3-1 to win the championship.

On 17 May, the International Table Tennis Federation announced the world rankings for the 20th week of 2022. The combination of Sun Yingsha and Wang Chuqin ranked second in the world mixed doubles rankings with 4000 points. On 21 June, he ranked third in the world in men's doubles with Fan Zhendong, second in the world in mixed doubles with Sun Yingsha, and fifteenth in the world in mixed doubles with Wang Yidi.

On 11 July, he participated in the World Table Tennis Professional League WTT European Summer Series held in Budapest. On 14 July, in the mixed doubles quarter-finals of the 2022 WTT Star Challenge Budapest, Wang Chuqin/Wang Manyu eliminated the Slovak combination of Pitjeva/Barazova 3-0 and advanced to the semi-finals. On the same day, in the second round of the men's singles of the 2022 WTT Star Challenge in Budapest, Hungary, Wang Chuqin defeated Kanak of the United States in three straight sets with scores of 11-5, 11-8, and 11-7.

=== 2023 ===
In April 2023, Wang defeated Ma Long 4-0 in the finals of the WTT Champions Macao, winning the event for the second time as he also won this event in 2022. In May 2023, Wang was the silver medallist of the World Table Tennis Championships after being defeated by Fan Zhendong 4-2 in the finals. He was also the gold medallist for both the mixed doubles (with Sun Yingsha) and men's doubles (with Fan Zhendong) events.

On 4 July 2023, Wang topped the ITTF world ranking in men's singles for the first time in his career.

Later in September 2023, at the 2022 Hangzhou Asian Games, Wang became the first male player in Chinese table tennis history to win four gold medals in a single Asian Games.

=== 2024 ===
Wang Chuqin won the World Team Table Tennis Championships in Busan with Chinese national table tennis team composed of him, Fan Zhendong, Ma Long, Liang Jingkun and Lin Gaoyuan.

He was named to the Chinese national table tennis team for the 2024 Paris Olympics, playing in the men's singles, men's team, and mixed doubles events. He won the mixed doubles title and the men's team title at the Paris Olympics in August. However, he was eliminated in the men's singles round of 32 after a photographer broke his racket.

In November, he won his third consecutive season-ending WTT Finals singles after defeating Tomokazu Harimoto by 4-0 in Fukuoka.

=== 2025 ===
In February, Wang Chuqin won the WTT Singapore Smash in men's doubles with Lin Shidong and a few days later, he won the Asian Cup.

In March, he won the WTT Champions Chongqing.

In May 2025, Wang won his first World Table Tennis Championships Men's Singles title after defeating Hugo Calderano by 4-1 in the finals, becoming the first left-handed World Champion from China and the first left-handed World Champion since Jean-Philippe Gatien won in 1993.

In July 2025, he won the WTT United States Smash Men's Singles title after defeating Tomokazu Harimoto 4-0 in the final.

In September 2025, he won the WTT Champions Macao the 3rd time and returned to become world no.1 in rankings.

=== 2026 ===
In February 2026, he won the men's singles title for the second consecutive time at the Asian Cup.

In April 2026, Wang won the ITTF World Cup after defeating Sora Matsushima 4-3 in the final.

In May 2026, he won the men's team title at the London World Team Table Tennis Championships and was selected as the tournament's most valuable male player with a perfect record of ten wins in ten appearances.

In June 2026, Wang succeeded Ma Long as the new captain of the Chinese men's table tennis team.

== Singles titles ==
Year	Tournament	Final opponent	Score	Ref
2018	Youth Olympic Games	(Japan) Tomokazu Harimoto	4–1	
2019	ITTF World Tour, Swedish Open	(China) Lin Gaoyuan	4–0	
2022	WTT Star Contender European Summer Series	(Sweden) Truls Möregårdh	4–1	
2022	WTT Champions Macao	(China) Fan Zhendong	4–3	
2022	WTT Cup Finals	(Japan) Tomokazu Harimoto	4–2	
2023	WTT Champions Macao	(China) Ma Long	4–0	
2023	Asian Games	(China) Fan Zhendong	4–3	
2023	WTT Star Contender Lanzhou	(China) Ma Long	4–2	
2024	WTT Finals	(China) Fan Zhendong	4–0	
2024	WTT Star Contender Doha	(China) Lin Shidong	4–2	
2024	WTT Singapore Smash	(China) Liang Jingkun	4–1	
2024	WTT Saudi Smash	(Germany) Patrick Franziska	4–2	
2024	WTT Finals	(Japan) Tomokazu Harimoto	4–0	
2025	Asian Cup	(China) Liang Jingkun	4–0	
2025	WTT Champions Chongqing	(China) Lin Shidong	4–1	
2025	World Championships	(Brazil) Hugo Calderano	4–1	
2025	WTT United States Smash	(Japan) Tomokazu Harimoto	4–0	
2025	WTT Champions Macao	(Brazil) Hugo Calderano	4–0	
2025	WTT China Smash	(France) Félix Lebrun	4–0	
2026	Asian Cup	(Japan) Tomokazu Harimoto	4–2	
2026	WTT Singapore Smash	(Chinese Taipei) Lin Yun-ju	4–0	
2026	World Cup	(Japan) Sora Matsushima	4–3	

== Performance timeline ==
W	F	SF	QF	R#	RR	Q#	A	G	S	B	NH	N/A	DNQ

(W) won; (F) finalist; (SF) semi-finalist; (QF) quarter-finalist; (R#) rounds 16, 32, 64, 128; (RR) round-robin stage; (Q#) qualification round; (A) absent; (G) gold, (S) silver or (B) bronze medal; (NH) not held; (N/A) not applicable; (DNQ) did not qualify.

To avoid confusion and double counting, these charts are updated at the conclusion of a tournament or when the player's participation has ended.

=== National team ===
- Men's team

Team events	2018	2019	2020	2021	2022	2023	2024	2025	2026
Olympic Games	NH	NH	A	NH	NH	NH	G	NH	NH
World Championships	G	NH	NH	NH	G	NH	G	NH	G
Asian Games	G	NH	NH	NH	NH	G	NH	NH	
Asian Championships	NH	G	NH	A	NH	G	G	G	

- Boys' team

Team events	2012	2013	2014	2015	2016	2017
World Youth Championships	A	A	G	G	A	G
Asian Youth Championships	A	G	A	G	A	G
World Cadet Challenge	A	W	A	A	A	A
China Jr & Cadet Open	W	W	W	A	A	W

- Mixed team

Team events	2018	2019	2020	2021	2022	2023	2024	2025
World Cup	NH	NH	NH	NH	NH	G	G	G
Youth Olympic Games	G	NH	NH	NH	NH	NH	NH	NH

=== Individual competitions ===
==== Senior level ====
- Men's singles

Tournaments	2019	2020	2021	2022	2023	2024	2025	2026
Olympic Games	NH	NH	A	NH	NH	R32	NH	NH
World Championships	A	NH	R16	NH	S	NH	G	NH
World Cup	A	A	NH	NH	NH	B	B	G
Asian Games	NH	NH	NH	NH	G	NH	NH	
Asian Championships	QF	NH	A	NH	R64	QF	NH	
Asian Cup	A	NH	NH	QF	NH	NH	G	G

Tournaments		2014	2015	2016	2017	2018	2019	2020	2021	2022	2023	2024	2025	2026
Year-end Finals		A	A	A	A	A	A	A	SF	W	W	W	SF	
WTT Smash	China	World Tour							NH	NH	NH	R32	W	
WTT Smash	(Saudi Arabia) Saudi	World Tour							NH	NH	NH	W	NH	NH
WTT Smash	Singapore	World Tour							NH	R16	SF	W	SF	W
WTT Smash	(United States) US	World Tour							NH	NH	NH	NH	W	
WTT Champions	(Hungary) Budapest	World Tour							NH	R32	NH	NH	NH	NH
WTT Champions	(China) Chongqing	World Tour							NH	NH	NH	F	W	QF
WTT Champions	(Germany) Frankfurt	World Tour							NH	NH	SF	R16	A	
WTT Champions	Macau	World Tour							NH	W	W	SF	W	
WTT Champions	(China) Xinxiang	World Tour							NH	NH	QF	NH	NH	NH
WTT Champions	(Japan) Yokohama	World Tour							NH	NH	NH	NH	F	
WTT Star; Contender	(Hungary) Budapest	World Tour							NH	W	NH	NH	NH	NH
WTT Star; Contender	(Qatar) Doha	World Tour							A	A	NH	W	A	A
WTT Star; Contender	(China) Lanzhou	World Tour							NH	NH	W	NH	NH	NH
WTT Star; Contender	(Slovenia) Ljubljana	World Tour							NH	NH	F	A	A	A
WTT Contender	(Slovenia) Lasko	World Tour							QF	NH	NH	NH	NH	NH
WTT Contender	(Oman) Muscat	World Tour							NH	QF	A	A	A	A
WTT Contender	(Slovenia) Novo Mesto	World Tour							F	NH	NH	NH	NH	NH
WTT Contender	(China) Taiyuan	World Tour							NH	NH	R32	A	A	A
ITTF World Tour	Argentina Open	SF	A	NH	NH	NH	NH	NH	WTT Series					
ITTF World Tour	(Australia) Australian Open	A	A	A	A	A	F	NH	WTT Series					
ITTF World Tour	(Austria) Austrian Open	NH	A	R64	Q32	Q128	Q32	NH	WTT Series					
ITTF World Tour	Brazil Open	SF	NH	NH	NH	NH	NH	NH	WTT Series					
ITTF World Tour	China Open	A	A	A	A	R16	Q32	NH	WTT Series					
ITTF World Tour	(Germany) German Open	A	A	A	A	A	R16	A	WTT Series					
ITTF World Tour	Hong Kong Open	NH	NH	NH	NH	A	QF	NH	WTT Series					
ITTF World Tour	(Hungary) Hungarian Open	A	A	A	A	F	F	A	WTT Series					
ITTF World Tour	Japan Open	A	A	A	A	A	Q64	NH	WTT Series					
ITTF World Tour	(South Korea) Korea Open	A	A	A	A	Q	SF	NH	WTT Series					
ITTF World Tour	Qatar Open	A	A	A	A	Q32	Q64	SF	WTT Series					
ITTF World Tour	(Sweden) Swedish Open	A	A	R32	A	Q32	W	NH	WTT Series					
ITTF Challenge	Portugal Open	NH	NH	NH	NH	NH	R16	A	WTT Series					
T2 Diamond	Malaysia	NH	NH	NH	NH	NH	R16	NH	WTT Series					

- Men's doubles

Tournaments	2019	2020	2021	2022	2023	2024	2025
World Championships	G	NH	QF	NH	G	NH	A
Asian Games	NH	NH	NH	NH	G	NH	NH
Asian Championships	A	NH	A	NH	S	A	NH

Tournaments		2018	2019	2020	2021	2022	2023	2024	2025
Year-end Finals		A	A	A	NH	NH	SF	SF	NH
WTT Smash	China	World Tour			NH	NH	NH	W	W
WTT Smash	(Saudi Arabia) Saudi	World Tour			NH	NH	NH	W	NH
WTT Smash	Singapore	World Tour			NH	W	W	F	W
WTT Star; Contender	(Hungary) Budapest	World Tour			NH	SF	NH	NH	NH
WTT Star; Contender	(Qatar) Doha	World Tour			A	A	NH	F	A
WTT Contender	(Slovenia) Lasko	World Tour			SF	NH	NH	NH	NH
WTT Contender	(Oman) Muscat	World Tour			NH	QF	A	A	A
WTT Contender	(Slovenia) Novo Mesto	World Tour			F	NH	NH	NH	NH
WTT Contender	(China) Taiyuan	World Tour			NH	NH	F	F	A
ITTF World Tour	(Austria) Austrian Open	QF	R16	NH	WTT Series				
ITTF World Tour	China Open	Q16	F	NH	WTT Series				
ITTF World Tour	Hong Kong Open	A	Q16	NH	WTT Series				
ITTF World Tour	(South Korea) Korea Open	SF	A	NH	WTT Series				
ITTF World Tour	Qatar Open	A	R16	SF	WTT Series				
ITTF Challenge	Portugal Open	NH	QF	A	WTT Series				

- Mixed doubles

Tournaments	2018	2019	2020	2021	2022	2023	2024	2025	2026
Olympic Games	NH	NH	NH	A	NH	NH	G	NH	NH
World Championships	NH	A	NH	G	NH	G	NH	G	NH
Asian Games	G	NH	NH	NH	NH	G	NH	NH	
Asian Championships	NH	S	NH	A	NH	A	A	NH	

Tournaments		2018	2019	2020	2021	2022	2023	2024	2025	2026
Year-end Finals		A	A	A	NH	NH	NH	NH	F	
WTT Smash	China	World Tour			NH	NH	NH	A	W	
WTT Smash	(Saudi Arabia) Saudi	World Tour			NH	NH	NH	W	NH	NH
WTT Smash	Singapore	World Tour			NH	W	W	W	A	A
WTT Smash	United States	World Tour			NH	NH	NH	NH	A	
WTT Star; Contender	(Hungary) Budapest	World Tour			NH	W	NH	NH	NH	NH
WTT Star; Contender	(Qatar) Doha	World Tour			A	A	NH	W	A	A
WTT Star; Contender	(China) Lanzhou	World Tour			NH	NH	SF	NH	NH	NH
WTT Star; Contender	(Slovenia) Ljubljana	World Tour			NH	NH	W	A	A	A
WTT Contender	(Qatar) Doha	World Tour			A	A	A	W	A	NH
WTT Contender	(Slovenia) Lasko	World Tour			W	NH	NH	NH	NH	NH
WTT Contender	(Oman) Muscat	World Tour			NH	W	A	A	A	A
WTT Contender	(Slovenia) Novo Mesto	World Tour			W	NH	NH	NH	NH	NH
WTT Contender	(China) Taiyuan	World Tour			NH	NH	F	QF	A	A
WTT Contender	(Croatia) Zagreb	World Tour			NH	A	W	A	A	A
ITTF World Tour	Austria Open	A	R16	NH	WTT Series					
ITTF World Tour	(Germany) German Open	A	F	A	WTT Series					
ITTF World Tour	(South Korea) Korea Open	F	A	A	WTT Series					
ITTF World Tour	Qatar Open	A	A	F	WTT Series					
