= Cho Dae-seong =

South Korean table tennis player

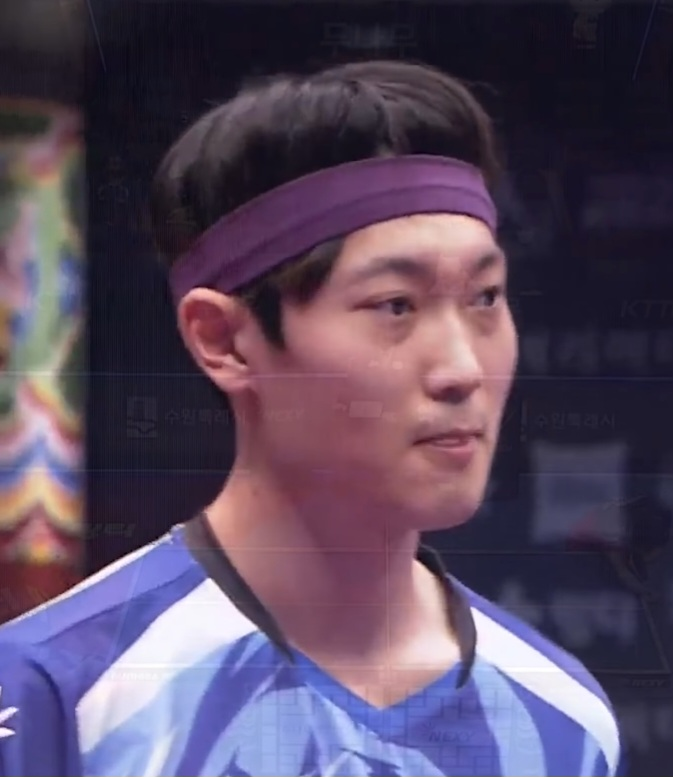

Personal information
- Born: 13 October 2002 (age 24)
- Height: 178 cm (5 ft 10 in)

Sport
- Sport: Table tennis
- Club: Ryukyu Asteeda (T.League)
- Playing style: Left-handed shakehand grip
- Highest ranking: 19 (7 January 2025)
- Current ranking: 48 (12 January 2026)
Medal record
Men's table tennis
Representing South Korea
World Championships
Bronze medal – third place	2022 Chengdu	Team
Bronze medal – third place	2023 Durban	Doubles
World Cup
Silver medal – second place	2024 Chengdu	Mixed team
Asian Championships
Bronze medal – third place	2024 Astana	Team
World University Games
Bronze medal – third place	2025 Rhine-Ruhr	Doubles

Cho Dae-seong (Korean: 조대성, born 13 October 2002) is a South Korean table tennis player.

As a left-handed player, Cho has won several doubles titles on ITTF and WTT tournaments since 2019. In 2023, Cho defeated Mattias Falck and Fan Zhendong in the first and second round of the WTT Star Contender Goa before he lost to the eventual runner-up Lin Shidong in the round of 16.

Cho won his first two singles titles at the WTT Feeder series in 2024. He further made it onto the Korean national team roster for the 2024 Paris Olympics as the second highest Korean in the top 30 on the ITTF world rankings.

== Titles ==
=== Singles ===
Year	Tournament	Final opponent	Score	Ref
2024	WTT Feeder Manchester	(Sweden) Elias Ranefur	3–0	
2024	WTT Feeder Otocec	(Finland) Benedek Oláh	3–1	

=== Men's doubles ===
Year	Tournament	Partner	Final opponent	Score	Ref
2019	ITTF World Tour, Czech Open	Lee Sang-su	(Chinese Taipei) Liao Cheng-ting / Lin Yun-ju	3–1	
2020	ITTF World Tour Platinum, German Open	Jang Woo-jin	(China) Lin Gaoyuan / Ma Long	3–2	
2021	WTT Contender Doha	Lee Sang-su	(Argentina) Horacio Cifuentes / Gastón Alto	3–2	
2022	WTT Contender Zagreb	Jang Woo-jin	(Japan) Yukiya Uda / Shunsuke Togami	3–0	
2022	WTT Feeder Otocec	Jang Woo-jin	(China) Xiang Peng / Lin Shidong	3–2	
2022	WTT Star Contender European Summer Series	Lee Sang-su	(China) Liang Jingkun / Lin Gaoyuan	3–2	
2026	WTT Star Contender Doha	Jang Woo-jin	(China) Huang Youzheng / Wen Ruibo	3–2	

=== Mixed doubles ===
Year	Tournament	Partner	Final opponent	Score	Ref
2019	ITTF World Tour, Czech Open	Shin Yu-bin	(Japan) Jun Mizutani / Mima Ito	3–2	
2022	WTT Feeder Düsseldorf III	Lee Zi-on	(Hong Kong) Ho Kwan Kit / Lee Ho Ching	3–1	
2023	WTT Contender Almaty	Joo Cheon-hui	(Chinese Taipei) Lin Yun-ju / Chen Szu-yu	3–1	
