= Ali Al-Khadrawi =

Saudi Arabian table tennis player (born 1997)

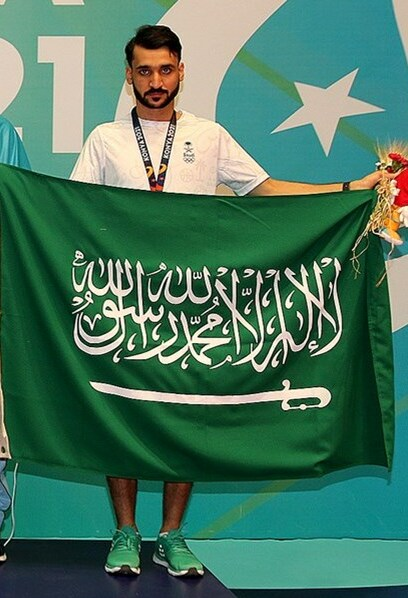
- Ali Al-Khadrawi at the 2021 Islamic Solidarity Games

Personal information
- Born: 31 May 1997 (age 29) Qatif, Saudi Arabia

Sport
- Sport: Table tennis
Medal record
Men's table tennis
Representing Saudi Arabia
Islamic Solidarity Games
Silver medal – second place	2021 Konya	Team
Bronze medal – third place	2021 Konya	Singles
Bronze medal – third place	2025 Riyadh	Doubles

Ali Al-Khadrawi (Arabic: علي الخضراوي; born 31 May 1997) is a Saudi Arabian table tennis player. He competed in the 2020 Summer Olympics.
