= Jang Woo-jin =

South Korean table tennis player

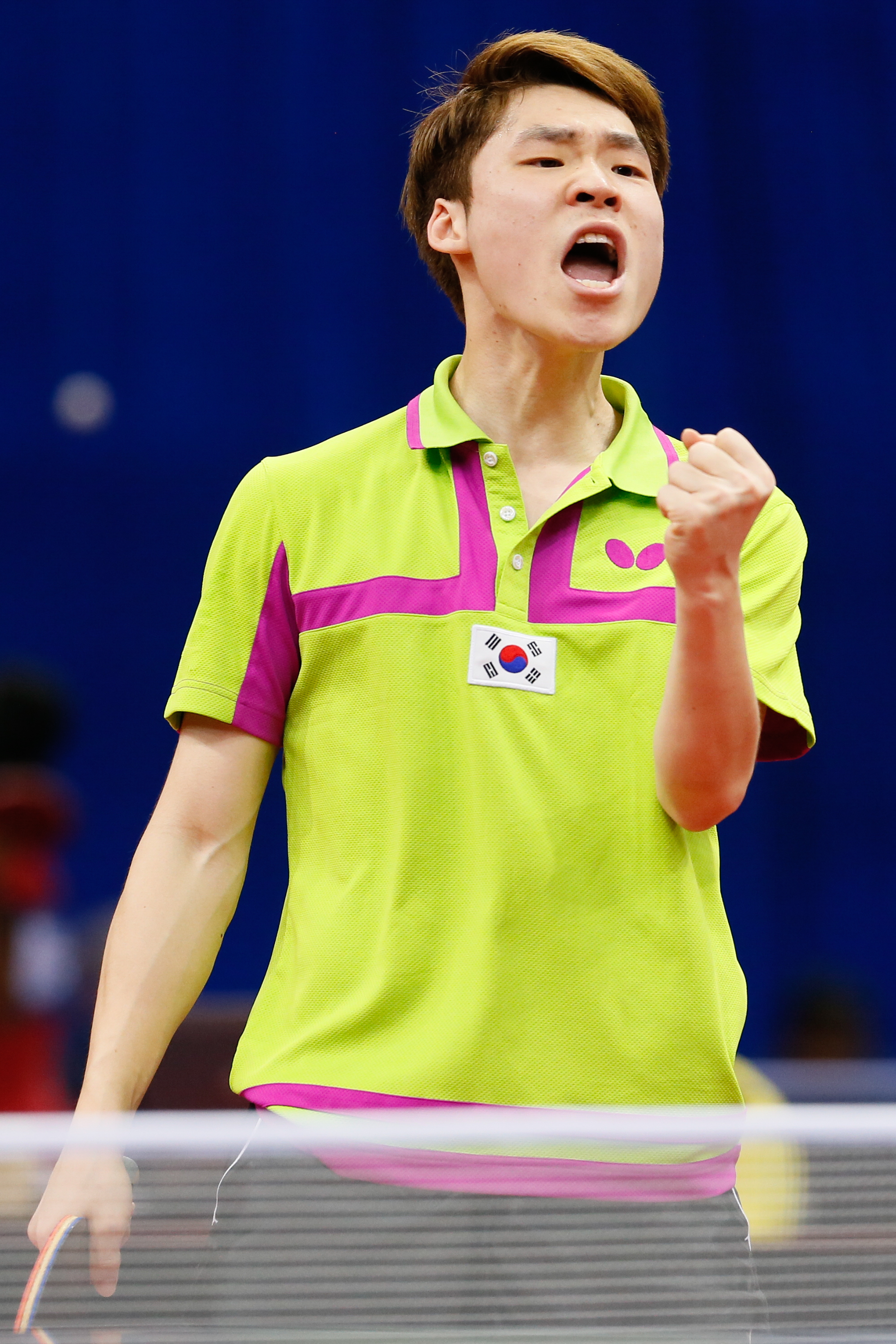
- Jang in 2017

Personal information
- Born: 10 September 1995 (age 31) Sokcho, South Korea
- Height: 172 cm (5 ft 8 in)

Sport
- Sport: Table tennis
- Club: Kanazawa Port (T.League)
- Playing style: Right-handed, shakehand attacking
- Highest ranking: 8 (4 July 2023)
- Current ranking: 8 (2 November 2026)
Medal record
Men's table tennis
Representing South Korea
World Championships
Silver medal – second place	2021 Houston	Doubles
Silver medal – second place	2023 Durban	Doubles
Bronze medal – third place	2016 Kuala Lumpur	Team
Bronze medal – third place	2018 Halmstad	Team
Bronze medal – third place	2022 Chengdu	Team
Bronze medal – third place	2024 Busan	Team
World Cup
Silver medal – second place	2019 Tokyo	Team
Silver medal – second place	2023 Chengdu	Mixed team
Silver medal – second place	2024 Chengdu	Mixed team
Asian Games
Silver medal – second place	2018 Jakarta	Team
Silver medal – second place	2022 Hangzhou	Doubles
Silver medal – second place	2022 Hangzhou	Team
Bronze medal – third place	2022 Hangzhou	Singles
Bronze medal – third place	2022 Hangzhou	Mixed doubles
Bronze medal – third place	2026 Aichi-Nagoya	Team
Asian Championships
Gold medal – first place	2021 Doha	Team
Silver medal – second place	2017 Wuxi	Team
Silver medal – second place	2019 Yogyakarta	Team
Silver medal – second place	2021 Doha	Doubles
Silver medal – second place	2021 Doha	Mixed doubles
Bronze medal – third place	2015 Pattaya	Team
Bronze medal – third place	2021 Doha	Singles
Bronze medal – third place	2023 Pyeongchang	Doubles
Bronze medal – third place	2023 Pyeongchang	Team
Bronze medal – third place	2024 Astana	Team

Jang Woo-jin (Korean: 장우진, born 10 September 1995) is a South Korean table tennis player.

== Career ==
=== Junior ===
Jang started playing international matches from the South Korean cadet boys' team in 2009 – Bahrain Junior Open held in Manama, Bahrain. He won boys' singles title at the 2013 World Junior Table Tennis Championships.

=== 2018 ===
He won the gold medal in 2018 Korea Open held at Daejeon, South Korea without even having been a seeded player at the start of the tournament. He became the first-ever ITTF World Tour triple crown winner in this event as well by also winning gold medals in men's doubles and mixed doubles.

=== 2020 ===
In 2020 ITTF Men's World Cup, he was seeded at 12 and managed to reach up to semi-finals. Within a week from this world cup, in 2020 ITTF Finals, he was seeded at 14 and managed to reach semi-finals again.

=== 2021 ===
Jang Woo-jin represented South Korea at the 2020 Tokyo Olympics after qualifying by virtue of being the highest ranked Korean player. In March, Jang played in the WTT Star Contender event at WTT Doha, but he suffered a disappointing round of 32 exit to Ruwen Filus.

Jang lost 4–3 to Hugo Calderano in the round of 16 in the men's singles event in the Tokyo Olympics.

== Singles titles ==
Year	Tournament	Final opponent	Score	Ref
2016	ITTF World Tour, Belarus Open	(Russia) Grigory Vlasov	4–3	
2018	ITTF World Tour Platinum, Korea Open	(China) Liang Jingkun	4–0	
2022	WTT Feeder Otocec	(China) Xiang Peng	4–3	
2022	WTT Contender Muscat	(China) Liang Yanning	4–3	
2026	WTT Champions Montpellier	(Germany) Patrick Franziska	4–3	
