= Kirill Gerassimenko =

Kazakhstani table tennis player

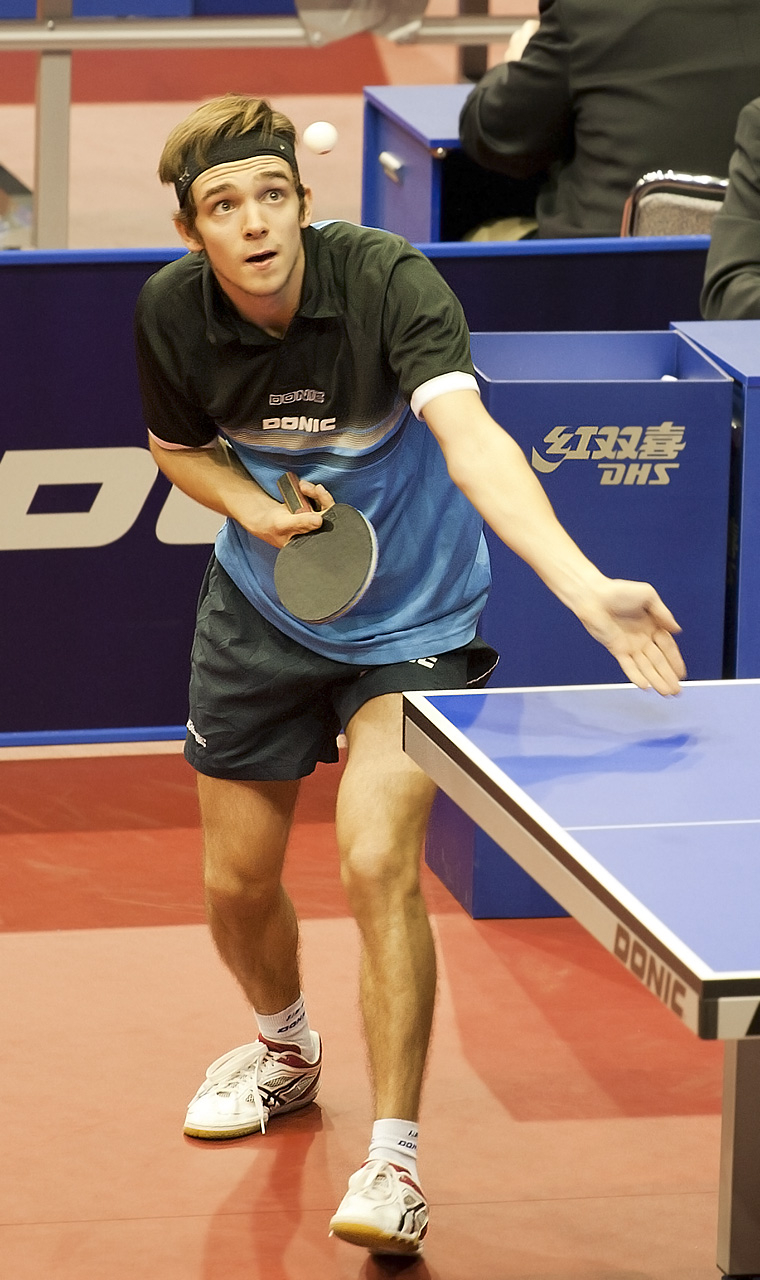
- Gerassimenko at the ITTF World Tour 2017 German Open

Personal information
- Native name: Кирилл Геннадьевич Герасименко
- Born: 18 December 1996 (age 29) Astana, Kazakhstan
- Height: 175 cm (5 ft 9 in)
- Weight: 64 kg (141 lb)

Sport
- Sport: Table tennis
- Current ranking: 49 (5 October 2026)
Medal record
Men's table tennis
Representing Kazakhstan
Islamic Solidarity Games
Gold medal – first place	2025 Riyadh	Singles
Gold medal – first place	2025 Riyadh	Team

Kirill Gennadyevich Gerassimenko (Russian: Кирилл Геннадьевич Герасименко; born 18 December 1996) is a Kazakhstani table tennis player. He competed at the 2016 Summer Olympics in the men's singles event, in which he was eliminated in the first round by Ádám Pattantyús. Gerassimenko also competed at the 2020 Summer Olympics and 2024 Summer Olympics. He represented Kazakhstan at the 2014 Asian Games and the 2022 Asian Games.
