= 2019 Czech Open (table tennis) =

Tournament details
- Dates: 22–25 August 2019
- Competitors: 32S / 16D
- Venue: OMEGA Sport Center
- Location: Olomouc, Czech Republic

Champions
- Men's singles: (Chinese Taipei) Lin Yun-ju
- Women's singles: (China) Chen Xingtong
- Men's doubles: (South Korea) Cho Dae-seong (South Korea) Lee Sang-su
- Women's doubles: (China) Gu Yuting (China) Mu Zi
- Mixed doubles: (South Korea) Cho Dae-seong (South Korea) Shin Yu-bin

The 2019 Czech Open was a table tennis tournament which took place at OMEGA Sport Center in Olomouc, Czech Republic, from 22 to 25 August 2019 and had a total prize of $190,000.

== Tournament ==
The 2019 Czech Open was the ninth tournament of the 2019 ITTF World Tour and also part of the Czech Open championships.

=== Venue ===
This tournament was held at the OMEGA Sport Center in Olomouc, Czech Republic.

=== Point distribution ===
Below is the point distribution table for each phase of the tournament.

Event	Winner	Finalist	Semi-finalist	Quarter-finalist	Round of 16	Round of 32
Singles	250	125	63	31	16	8
Doubles	200	100	50	25	13	—

=== Prize pool ===
The total prize money is US$190,000.

Event	Winner	Finalist	Semi-finalist	Quarter-finalist	Round of 16	Round of 32
Singles	$21,000	$10,600	$5,500	$2,800	$1,400	$750
Doubles	$6,000	$3,000	$1,500	—	—	—

== Men's singles ==
=== Seeds ===
1. (Japan) Tomokazu Harimoto (first round)
2. (Brazil) Hugo Calderano (semi-finals)
3. (Germany) Timo Boll (semi-finals)
4. (Germany) Dimitrij Ovtcharov (final)
5. (Japan) Koki Niwa (first round)
6. (Japan) Jun Mizutani (second round)
7. (South Korea) Lee Sang-su (quarter-finals)
8. (England) Liam Pitchford (first round)
9. (Chinese Taipei) Lin Yun-ju (champion)
10. (Germany) Patrick Franziska (quarter-finals)
11. (Hong Kong) Wong Chun Ting (first round)
12. (Belarus) Vladimir Samsonov (second round)
13. (South Korea) Lim Jong-hoon (first round)
14. (India) Sathiyan Gnanasekaran (second round)
15. (France) Simon Gauzy (second round)
16. (Czech Republic) Pavel Sirucek (first round)

=== Draw ===
==== Finals ====
Semifinals
9	(Chinese Taipei) Lin Yun-ju	12	9	11	11	5	6	11
3	(Germany) Timo Boll	10	11	2	6	11	11	8
4	(Germany) Dimitrij Ovtcharov	7	11	11	13	6	11
2	(Brazil) Hugo Calderano	11	9	6	11	11	9

Final
9	(Chinese Taipei) Lin Yun-ju	11	11	4	11	11
4	(Germany) Dimitrij Ovtcharov	9	5	11	5	9

==== Top half ====
===== Section 1 =====
First round
1	(Japan) T Harimoto	11	11	8	11	9	9	7
(Romania) C Pletea	3	7	11	7	11	11	11
(Japan) Y Hirano	11	12	9	11	9	11
16	(Czech Republic) P Sirucek	7	10	11	9	11	4
9	(Chinese Taipei) Lin Y-j	11	5	6	11	5	11	11
(Chinese Taipei) Chen C-a	8	11	11	9	11	8	9
(Portugal) M Freitas	4	11	11	11	15
5	(Japan) K Niwa	11	9	7	4	13

Second round
(Romania) C Pletea	7	11	11	11	9	5	4
(Japan) Y Hirano	11	6	9	9	11	11	11
9	(Chinese Taipei) Lin Y-j	11	11	7	6	11	11
(Portugal) M Freitas	4	6	11	11	8	8

Quarterfinals
(Japan) Y Hirano	1	9	7	7
9	(Chinese Taipei) Lin Y-j	11	11	11	11

===== Section 2 =====
First round
7	(South Korea) Lee S-s	13	9	13	10	11	12
(South Korea) Cho D-s	11	11	11	12	7	10
(Japan) M Morizono	11	9	12	11	11	7	12
15	(France) S Gauzy	8	11	14	5	8	11	14
13	(South Korea) Lim J-h	5	9	11	9	5
(Japan) Y Uda	11	11	6	11	11
(China) Xia YZ	7	7	13	4	11	8
3	(Germany) T Boll	11	11	11	11	9	11

Second round
7	(South Korea) Lee S-s	12	5	11	11	4	11
15	(France) S Gauzy	10	11	4	9	11	8
(Japan) Y Uda	7	6	9	7
3	(Germany) T Boll	11	11	11	11

Quarterfinals
7	(South Korea) Lee S-s	11	11	13	14	9	10	8
3	(Germany) T Boll	6	9	15	12	11	12	11

==== Bottom half ====
===== Section 3 =====
First round
4	(Germany) D Ovtcharov	11	13	9	3	13	11
(China) Xue F	5	11	11	11	11	5
(Germany) R Filus	12	9	7	8	5
12	(Belarus) V Samsonov	10	11	11	11	11
10	(Germany) P Franziska	11	11	12	8	11	6	11
(Sweden) A Kallberg	8	6	14	11	2	11	9
(Germany) B Steger	10	14	7	8	11	5
6	(Japan) J Mizutani	12	12	11	11	7	11

Second round
4	(Germany) D Ovtcharov	11	5	11	12	11
12	(Belarus) V Samsonov	7	11	5	10	7
10	(Germany) P Franziska	10	11	13	7	12	11	11
6	(Japan) J Mizutani	12	6	15	11	10	8	1

Quarterfinals
4	(Germany) D Ovtcharov	11	13	11	12
10	(Germany) P Franziska	6	11	7	10

===== Section 4 =====
First round
8	(England) L Pitchford	5	11	6	13	3	8
(Russia) A Shibaev	11	6	11	11	11	11
(China) Ma T	11	7	11	11	12
11	(Hong Kong) Wong C T	8	11	6	7	10
14	(India) S Gnanasekaran	11	8	13	11	11
(Japan) T Arinobu	9	11	11	5	6
(Brazil) G Tsuboi	5	10	9	11	6
2	(Brazil) H Calderano	11	12	11	4	11

Second round
(Russia) A Shibaev	11	15	12	11
(China) Ma T	5	13	10	9
14	(India) S Gnanasekaran	10	6	9	7
2	(Brazil) H Calderano	12	11	11	11

Quarterfinals
(Russia) A Shibaev	9	6	11	1	4
2	(Brazil) H Calderano	11	11	6	11	11

== Women's singles ==
=== Seeds ===
1. (Japan) Kasumi Ishikawa (semi-finals)
2. (Japan) Mima Ito (second round)
3. (Japan) Miu Hirano (final)
4. (South Korea) Suh Hyo-won (second round)
5. (Singapore) Feng Tianwei (second round)
6. (China) He Zhuojia (quarter-finals)
7. (Japan) Saki Shibata (second round)
8. (Japan) Hitomi Sato (second round)
9. (South Korea) Jeon Ji-hee (quarter-finals)
10. (Austria) Sofia Polcanova (quarter-finals)
11. (China) Chen Xingtong (champion)
12. (Japan) Miyu Kato (first round)
13. (Japan) Honoka Hashimoto (second round)
14. (Germany) Petrissa Solja (first round )
15. (Puerto Rico) Adriana Diaz (first round)
16. (Czech Republic) Hana Matelova (second round)

=== Draw ===
==== Finals ====
Semifinals
1	(Japan) Kasumi Ishikawa	6	11	6	12	6
3	(Japan) Miu Hirano	11	4	11	14	11
(China) Feng Yalan	4	3	13	11	9
11	(China) Chen Xingtong	11	11	15	7	11

Final
3	(Japan) Miu Hirano	5	8	7	11	14	11	8
11	(China) Chen Xingtong	11	11	11	8	12	8	11

==== Top half ====
===== Section 1 =====
First round
1	(Japan) K Ishikawa	11	7	8	11	6	11	11
(Chinese Taipei) Cheng H-t	7	11	11	2	11	1	2
(China) Liu X	11	11	11	11
15	(Puerto Rico) A Diaz	4	7	9	9
13	(Japan) H Hashimoto	3	16	11	9	8	11	11
(Japan) M Kihara	11	14	8	11	11	8	5
(China) Gu YT	7	8	8	11	11	9
6	(China) He ZJ	11	11	11	9	7	11

Second round
1	(Japan) K Ishikawa	11	11	10	11	9	11
(China) Liu X	6	4	12	2	11	7
13	(Japan) H Hashimoto	12	9	11	11	5
6	(China) He ZJ	14	11	6	13	11

Quarterfinals
1	(Japan) K Ishikawa	11	11	11	7	11
6	(China) He ZJ	9	6	6	11	9

===== Section 2 =====
First round
5	(Singapore) Feng TW	9	11	9	11	11	12
(Netherlands) B Eerland	11	5	11	4	2	10
(China) Liu WS	5	13	11	11	11
12	(Japan) M Kato	11	11	7	5	4
16	(Czech Republic) H Matelova	11	11	10	11	4	12
(South Korea) Kim H-y	8	9	12	4	11	10
(Japan) A Narumoto	9	9	2	7
3	(Japan) M Hirano	11	11	11	11

Second round
5	(Singapore) Feng TW	9	5	8	3
(China) Liu WS	11	11	11	11
16	(Czech Republic) H Matelova	9	9	2	8
3	(Japan) M Hirano	11	11	11	11

Quarterfinals
(China) Liu WS	11	11	12	8	8	8	4
3	(Japan) M Hirano	8	7	10	11	11	11	11

==== Bottom half ====
===== Section 3 =====
First round
4	(South Korea) Suh H-w	11	7	11	11	3	11
(Ukraine) M Pesotska	6	11	8	8	11	7
(South Korea) Choi H-j	11	6	8	6	7
9	(South Korea) Jeon J-h	9	11	11	11	11
14	(Germany) P Solja	5	9	5	11	6
(China) Feng YL	11	11	11	7	11
(China) Li JY	13	10	8	6	11	7
8	(Japan) H Sato	11	12	11	11	9	11

Second round
4	(South Korea) Suh H-w	10	7	7	9
9	(South Korea) Jeon J-h	12	11	11	11
(China) Feng YL	5	11	11	11	11
8	(Japan) H Sato	11	8	6	6	8

Quarterfinals
9	(South Korea) Jeon J-h	9	11	6	11	7	11
(China) Feng YL	11	9	11	8	11	13

===== Section 4 =====
First round
7	(Japan) S Shibata	8	13	8	7	11	11	11
(Singapore) Yu MY	11	11	11	11	5	3	7
(Chinese Taipei) Chen S-y	11	11	11	6	11	10	8
10	(Austria) S Polcanova	7	9	6	11	13	12	11
11	(China) Chen XT	11	11	11	11
(China) Wu Y	4	7	8	7
(Japan) H Hayata	7	11	6	10	7
2	(Japan) M Ito	11	9	11	12	11

Second round
7	(Japan) S Shibata	7	11	11	10	11	5	9
10	(Austria) S Polcanova	11	8	6	12	8	11	11
11	(China) Chen XT	12	9	8	11	11	11
2	(Japan) M Ito	10	11	11	7	1	6

Quarterfinals
10	(Austria) S Polcanova	7	5	7	8
11	(China) Chen XT	11	11	11	11

== Men's doubles ==
=== Seeds ===
1. (Hong Kong) Wong Chun Ting / Ho Kwan Kit (quarter-finals)
2. (Chinese Taipei) Lin Yun-ju / Liao Cheng-ting (final)
3. (Chinese Taipei) Chen Chien-an / Chuang Chih-yuan (first round)
4. (Hungary) Nandor Ecseki / Adam Szudi (semi-finals)
5. (South Korea) Cho Dae-seong / Lee Sang-su (champion)
6. (Austria) Robert Gardos / Daniel Habesohn (semi-finals)
7. (Belgium) Florent Lambiet / Martin Allegro (second round)
8. (Czech Republic) Tomas Polansky / Pavel Sircek (first round)

=== Draw ===
First round
1	(Hong Kong) Ho K K (Hong Kong) Wong C T	15	11	14
(Romania) C Pletea (Greece) I Sgouropoulos	13	6	12
(China) Xia YZ (China) Zheng PF	11	9	11	7	7
6	(Austria) R Gardos (Austria) D Habesohn	7	11	5	11	11
5	(South Korea) Cho D-s (South Korea) Lee S-s	11	8	11	11
(Denmark) A Lind (Denmark) T Rasmussen	6	11	6	7
(China) Zhao ZH (China) Zhu LF	11	5	11	15	11
3	(Chinese Taipei) Chen C-a (Chinese Taipei) Chuang C-y	13	11	5	13	9
4	(Hungary) N Ecseki (Hungary) A Szudi	5	11	7	11	11
(Portugal) T Apolonia (Portugal) J Monteiro	11	9	11	4	5
(India) H Desai (India) M Thakkar	7	7	7
7	(Belgium) M Allegro (Belgium) F Lambiet	11	11	11
8	(Czech Republic) T Polansky (Czech Republic) P Sircek	7	7	8
(France) T Flore (France) E Lebesson	11	11	11
(Serbia) A Karakasevic (Hungary) B Majoros	6	6	8
2	(Chinese Taipei) Liao C-t (Chinese Taipei) Lin Y-j	11	11	11

Quarterfinals
1	(Hong Kong) Ho K K (Hong Kong) Wong C T	8	12	2	3
6	(Austria) R Gardos (Austria) D Habesohn	11	10	11	11
5	(South Korea) Cho D-s (South Korea) Lee S-s	11	11	13
(China) Zhao ZH (China) Zhu LF	8	7	11
4	(Hungary) N Ecseki (Hungary) A Szudi	11	10	11	11
7	(Belgium) M Allegro (Belgium) F Lambiet	5	12	6	7
(France) T Flore (France) E Lebesson	6	5	7
2	(Chinese Taipei) Liao C-t (Chinese Taipei) Lin Y-j	11	11	11

Semifinals
6	(Austria) R Gardos (Austria) D Habesohn	11	10	11	9	7
5	(South Korea) Cho D-s (South Korea) Lee S-s	9	12	9	11	11
4	(Hungary) N Ecseki (Hungary) A Szudi	7	8	9
2	(Chinese Taipei) Liao C-t (Chinese Taipei) Lin Y-j	11	11	11

Final
5	(South Korea) Cho D-s (South Korea) Lee S-s	11	11	7	11
2	(Chinese Taipei) Liao C-t (Chinese Taipei) Lin Y-j	4	8	11	6

== Women's doubles ==
=== Seeds ===
1. (Japan) Miyu Nagasaki / Miyuu Kihara (first round)
2. (Czech Republic) Hana Matelova / (Slovakia) Barbora Balazova (quarter-finals)
3. (Japan) Miu Hirano / Saki Shibata (final)
4. (Chinese Taipei) Chen Szu-yu / Cheng Hsien-tzu (semi-finals)
5. (Poland) Natalia Partyka / Natalia Bajor (quarter-finals)
6. (Singapore) Yu Mengyu / Lin Ye (quarter-finals)
7. (Puerto Rico) Melanie Diaz / Adriana Diaz (first round)
8. (China) Qian Tianyi / Chen Xingtong (first round)

=== Draw ===
First round
1	(Japan) M Kihara (Japan) M Nagasaki	9	11	10	11	9
(China) Gu YT (China) Mu Z	11	9	12	9	11
(Russia) Y Noskova (Russia) O Vorobeva	10	7	6
6	(Singapore) Lin Y (Singapore) Yu MY	12	11	11
8	(China) Chen XT (China) Qian TY	15	9	9	10
(France) S Loeuillette (France) A Zarif	13	11	11	12
(Portugal) L Oliveira (Poland) Shao J	8	11	8	4
4	(Chinese Taipei) Chen S-y (Chinese Taipei) Cheng H-t	11	7	11	11
3	(Japan) M Hirano (Japan) S Shibata	8	11	11	11
(South Korea) Choi H-j (South Korea) Lee Z-o	11	6	9	9
(Germany) C Mantz (Germany) Y Wan	11	11	9	7	2
5	(Poland) N Bajor (Poland) N Partyka	9	9	11	11	11
7	(Puerto Rico) A Diaz (Puerto Rico) M Diaz	11	5	6	3
(South Korea) Kim H-y (South Korea) Lee E-h	9	11	11	11
(Croatia) M Jeger (Croatia) Sun J	7	5	8
2	(Slovakia) B Balazova (Czech Republic) H Matelova	11	11	11

Quarterfinals
(China) Gu YT (China) Mu Z	11	11	11
6	(Singapore) Lin Y (Singapore) Yu MY	6	7	2
(France) S Loeuillette (France) A Zarif	7	11	7	8
4	(Chinese Taipei) Chen S-y (Chinese Taipei) Cheng H-t	11	6	11	11
3	(Japan) M Hirano (Japan) S Shibata	9	11	11	9	11
5	(Poland) N Bajor (Poland) N Partyka	11	2	4	11	9
(South Korea) Kim H-y (South Korea) Lee E-h	12	11	11	11
2	(Slovakia) B Balazova (Czech Republic) H Matelova	10	6	13	9

Semifinals
(China) Gu YT (China) Mu Z	11	11	11
4	(Chinese Taipei) Chen S-y (Chinese Taipei) Cheng H-t	6	7	7
3	(Japan) M Hirano (Japan) S Shibata	7	11	11	12
(South Korea) Kim H-y (South Korea) Lee E-h	11	8	7	10

Final
(China) Gu YT (China) Mu Z	9	11	11	11
3	(Japan) M Hirano (Japan) S Shibata	11	7	6	6

== Mixed doubles ==
=== Seeds ===
1. (South Korea) Lee Sang-su / Jeon Ji-hee (first round)
2. (Slovakia) Lubomir Pistej / Barbora Balazova (first round)
3. (Austria) Stefan Fegerl / Sofia Polcanova (semi-finals)
4. (Japan) Kasumi Ishikawa / Tomokazu Harimoto (first round)
5. (Hungary) Szandra Pergel / Adam Szudi (first round)
6. (France) Tristan Flore / Laura Gasnier (first round)
7. (Germany) Patrick Franziska / Petrissa Solja (first round)
8. (Czech Republic) Hana Matelova / Tomas Konecny (first round)

=== Draw ===
First round
1	(South Korea) Lee S-s (South Korea) Jeon J-h	11	6	6	12	11
(China) Ma T (China) Wu Y	6	11	11	10	13
(South Korea) Cho D-s (South Korea) Shin Y-b	11	9	11	6	11
6	(France) T Flore (France) L Gasnier	6	11	4	11	5
8	(Czech Republic) T Konecny (Czech Republic) H Matelova	11	8	11	2	4
(Portugal) T Apolonia (Portugal) Shao J	7	11	6	11	11
(Chinese Taipei) Feng Y-h (Chinese Taipei) Su P-l	11	9	11	12	5
3	(Austria) S Fegerl (Austria) S Polcanova	6	11	9	14	11
4	(Japan) T Harimoto (Japan) K Ishikawa	5	8	7
(Japan) J Mizutani (Japan) M Ito	11	11	11
(China) Zhu LF (China) He ZJ	11	12	5	11
7	(Germany) P Franziska (Germany) P Solja	7	10	11	6
5	(Hungary) A Szudi (Hungary) S Pergel	11	14	8	4	6
(Brazil) G Tsuboi (Brazil) B Takahashi	6	12	11	11	11
(Germany) D Qiu (Germany) N Mittelham	11	6	11	4	15
2	(Slovakia) L Pistej (Slovakia) B Balazova	8	11	5	11	13

Quarterfinals
(China) Ma T (China) Wu Y	11	4	8	7
(South Korea) Cho D-s (South Korea) Shin Y-b	4	11	11	11
(Portugal) T Apolonia (Portugal) Shao J	4	5	6
3	(Austria) S Fegerl (Austria) S Polcanova	11	11	11
(Japan) J Mizutani (Japan) M Ito	11	11	11
(China) Zhu LF (China) He ZJ	8	9	7
(Brazil) G Tsuboi (Brazil) B Takahashi	11	11	11
(Germany) D Qiu (Germany) N Mittelham	8	8	7

Semifinals
(South Korea) Cho D-s (South Korea) Shin Y-b	11	11	11
3	(Austria) S Fegerl (Austria) S Polcanova	6	5	9
(Japan) J Mizutani (Japan) M Ito	11	11	11
(Brazil) G Tsuboi (Brazil) B Takahashi	9	6	2

Final
(South Korea) Cho D-s (South Korea) Shin Y-b	6	15	12	16	12
(Japan) J Mizutani (Japan) M Ito	11	13	10	18	10
