= 2019 Japan Open (table tennis) =

Tournament details
- Dates: 14–16 June 2019
- Competitors: 32S / 16D
- Total prize money: US$270,000
- Venue: Hokkai Kitayell
- Location: Sapporo, Japan

Champions
- Men's singles: (China) Xu Xin
- Women's singles: (China) Sun Yingsha
- Men's doubles: (China) Fan Zhendong (China) Xu Xin
- Women's doubles: (China) Chen Meng (China) Liu Shiwen
- Mixed doubles: (China) Xu Xin (China) Zhu Yuling

The 2019 Japan Open was a table tennis tournament which took place at Hokkai Kitayell in Sapporo, Japan, from 14 to 16 June 2019 and had a total prize of $270,000.

== Tournament ==
The 2019 Japan Open was the fifth tournament of the 2019 ITTF World Tour and also part of the Japan Open championships, which have been held since 1989.

=== Venue ===
This tournament was held at the Hokkai Kitayell in Sapporo, Japan.

=== Point distribution ===
Below is the point distribution table for each phase of the tournament.

Event	Winner	Finalist	Semi-finalist	Quarter-finalist	Round of 16	Round of 32
Singles	500	300	200	100	50	25
Doubles	300	150	75	38	19	—

=== Prize pool ===
The total prize money is US$270,000.

Event	Winner	Finalist	Semi-finalist	Quarter-finalist	Round of 16	Round of 32
Singles	$30,000	$15,000	$7,500	$3,750	$2,100	$1,200
Doubles	$8,000	$4,000	$2,000	—	—	—

== Men's singles ==
=== Seeds ===
1. (China) Fan Zhendong (semi-finals)
2. (China) Lin Gaoyuan (second round)
3. (China) Xu Xin (champion)
4. (Japan) Tomokazu Harimoto (first round)
5. (China) Ma Long (quarter-finals)
6. (China) Liang Jingkun (quarter-finals)
7. (Brazil) Hugo Calderano (quarter-finals)
8. (South Korea) Jang Woo-jin (quarter-finals)
9. (South Korea) Lee Sang-su (second round)
10. (Japan) Koki Niwa (first round)
11. (Japan) Jun Mizutani (second round)
12. (Germany) Dimitrij Ovtcharov (second round)
13. (South Korea) Lim Jong-hoon (first round)
14. (Hong Kong) Wong Chun Ting (first round)
15. (South Korea) Jeoung Young-sik (second round)
16. (Chinese Taipei) Lin Yun-ju (final)

=== Draw ===
==== Finals ====
Semifinals
1	(China) Fan Zhendong	11	4	7	11	11	8	3
3	(China) Xu Xin	5	11	11	5	6	11	11
(China) Sun Wen	11	2	4	9	4
16	(Chinese Taipei) Lin Yun-Ju	6	11	11	11	11

Final
3	(China) Xu Xin	11	14	8	11	11
16	(Chinese Taipei) Lin Yun-Ju	9	12	11	3	8

==== Top half ====
===== Section 1 =====
First round
1	(China) Fan ZD	11	11	11	7	11
(China) Zheng PF	9	3	8	11	5
(Japan) K Yoshimura	11	1	11	13	5	15
10	(Japan) K Niwa	4	11	9	11	11	13
15	(South Korea) Jeoung Y-s	6	8	11	11	12	5	11
(China) Yan A	11	11	7	2	10	11	6
(South Korea) An J-h	8	8	11	6	6
5	(China) Ma L	11	11	8	11	11

Second round
1	(China) Fan ZD	11	11	11	13
(Japan) K Yoshimura	2	7	6	11
15	(South Korea) Jeoung Y-s	9	11	9	11	11	10	5
5	(China) Ma L	11	7	11	9	9	12	11

Quarterfinals
1	(China) Fan ZD	14	11	8	11	11
5	(China) Ma L	12	6	11	7	5

===== Section 2 =====
First round
8	(South Korea) Jang W-j	11	11	11	11	11
(Japan) M Yoshida	7	13	7	6	8
(Japan) Y Hirano	7	11	2	3	8
12	(Germany) D Ovtcharov	11	4	11	11	11
13	(South Korea) Lim J-h	11	11	8	8	11	5	7
(Chinese Taipei) Chuang C-y	7	9	11	11	7	11	11
(Japan) Y Oshima	9	10	4	8
3	(China) Xu X	11	11	11	11

Second round
8	(South Korea) Jang W-j	11	11	11	11
12	(Germany) D Ovtcharov	7	8	9	7
(Chinese Taipei) Chuang C-y	6	7	15	4
3	(China) Xu X	11	11	17	11

Quarterfinals
8	(South Korea) Jang W-j	5	5	9	6
3	(China) Xu X	11	11	11	11

==== Bottom half ====
===== Section 3 =====
First round
4	(Japan) T Harimoto	8	5	7	8
(China) Sun W	11	11	11	11
(China) Zhao ZH	6	13	7	11	7	3
9	(South Korea) Lee S-s	11	11	11	9	11	11
11	(Japan) J Mizutani	10	11	13	11	13	12
(Japan) M Oikawa	12	13	11	5	11	10
(Chinese Taipei) Peng W-w	5	9	6	8
6	(China) Liang JK	11	11	11	11

Second round
(China) Sun W	11	8	11	11	11
9	(South Korea) Lee S-s	3	11	8	8	7
11	(Japan) J Mizutani	11	11	8	14	10	5
6	(China) Liang JK	3	9	16	12	11	11

Quarterfinals
(China) Sun W	11	13	2	11	9	11
6	(China) Liang JK	6	11	11	8	11	7

===== Section 4 =====
First round
7	(Brazil) H Calderano	11	8	12	8	11	8	11
(Japan) T Jin	2	11	10	11	7	11	6
(Germany) R Filus	9	9	11	11	11	11
14	(Hong Kong) Wong C T	11	11	6	5	7	9
16	(Chinese Taipei) Lin Y-j	5	11	7	11	11	10	11
(South Korea) Cho S-m	11	9	11	9	8	12	9
(Chinese Taipei) Yang H-w	8	8	3	7
2	(China) Lin GY	11	11	11	11

Second round
7	(Brazil) H Calderano	5	11	9	11	9	11	11
(Germany) R Filus	11	5	11	7	11	5	3
16	(Chinese Taipei) Lin Y-j	9	9	21	11	11	11
2	(China) Lin GY	11	11	19	9	7	9

Quarterfinals
7	(Brazil) H Calderano	11	9	7	10
16	(Chinese Taipei) Lin Y-j	13	11	11	12

== Women's singles ==
=== Seeds ===
1. (China) Ding Ning (second round)
2. (China) Chen Meng (semi-finals)
3. (China) Wang Manyu (quarter-finals)
4. (China) Liu Shiwen (final)
5. (China) Zhu Yuling (first round)
6. (Japan) Kasumi Ishikawa (second round)
7. (Japan) Mima Ito (first round)
8. (Chinese Taipei) Cheng I-ching (first round)
9. (Japan) Miu Hirano (semi-finals)
10. (South Korea) Suh Hyo-won (first round)
11. (Hong Kong) Doo Hoi Kem (first round)
12. (Singapore) Feng Tianwei (first round)
13. (Japan) Saki Shibata (first round)
14. (Japan) Hitomi Sato (quarter-finals)
15. (China) Chen Xingtong (second round)
16. (South Korea) Jeon Ji-hee (second round)

=== Draw ===
==== Finals ====
Semifinals
9	(Japan) Miu Hirano	11	5	4	3	10
4	(China) Liu Shiwen	9	11	11	11	12
(China) Sun Yingsha	5	11	11	14	11
2	(China) Chen Meng	11	8	7	12	6

Final
4	(China) Liu Shiwen	4	9	11	11	11	8	3
(China) Sun Yingsha	11	11	4	6	7	11	11

==== Top half ====
===== Section 1 =====
First round
1	(China) Ding N	11	11	11	11
(China) Zhang R	5	3	8	4
(Chinese Taipei) Chiu S-h	7	12	6	9	6
14	(Japan) H Sato	11	10	11	11	11
9	(Japan) M Hirano	13	11	14	5	11
(Hong Kong) Soo W Y	11	9	12	11	7
(Japan) M Nagasaki	11	5	11	11	11
5	(China) Zhu YL	6	11	9	7	9

Second round
1	(China) Ding N	10	11	11	10	6	9
14	(Japan) H Sato	12	6	3	12	11	11
9	(Japan) M Hirano	8	11	11	12	11
(Japan) M Nagasaki	11	5	5	10	9

Quarterfinals
14	(Japan) H Sato	10	6	5	8
9	(Japan) M Hirano	12	11	11	11

===== Section 2 =====
First round
8	(Chinese Taipei) Cheng I-c	11	11	8	5	7
(China) Liu F	13	8	11	11	11
(Japan) S Mori	9	11	4	11	11	11	11
13	(Japan) S Shibata	11	9	11	3	7	12	6
16	(South Korea) Jeon J-h	11	8	12	10	11	11
(Chinese Taipei) Cheng H-t	9	11	10	12	6	6
(South Korea) Yang H-e	5	8	3	5
4	(China) Liu SW	11	11	11	11

Second round
(China) Liu F	11	9	11	11	12	7	13
(Japan) S Mori	13	11	6	6	10	11	11
16	(South Korea) Jeon J-h	11	5	11	3	5	3
4	(China) Liu SW	6	11	7	11	11	11

Quarterfinals
(China) Liu F	8	7	11	1	5
4	(China) Liu SW	11	11	7	11	11

==== Bottom half ====
===== Section 3 =====
First round
3	(China) Wang MY	12	11	7	5	11	11
(China) Wu Y	10	9	11	11	4	7
(China) Che XX	9	7	11	4	11	11	8
15	(China) Chen XT	11	11	7	11	7	9	11
10	(South Korea) Suh H-w	2	5	5	5
(China) Sun YS	11	11	11	11
(Japan) M Kihara	4	7	10	1
6	(Japan) K Ishikawa	11	11	12	11

Second round
3	(China) Wang MY	11	11	11	11
15	(China) Chen XT	9	5	2	8
(China) Sun YS	11	11	11	11
6	(Japan) K Ishikawa	8	6	5	6

Quarterfinals
3	(China) Wang MY	8	10	4	9
(China) Sun YS	11	12	11	11

===== Section 4 =====
First round
7	(Japan) M Ito	11	7	8	9	14	10
(China) Gu YT	7	11	11	11	12	12
(China) He ZJ	13	11	11	9	10	11
12	(Singapore) Feng TW	11	5	1	11	12	8
11	(Hong Kong) Doo H K	7	8	8	10
(Hong Kong) Lee H C	11	11	11	11
(Japan) H Hayata	11	9	10	11	8	7
2	(China) Chen M	3	11	12	8	11	11

Second round
(China) Gu YT	11	7	5	11	11	11
(China) He ZJ	5	11	11	5	3	9
(Hong Kong) Lee H C	5	4	4	12
2	(China) Chen M	11	11	11	14

Quarterfinals
(China) Gu YT	6	11	4	11	7	12	5
2	(China) Chen M	11	7	11	7	11	10	11

== Men's doubles ==
=== Seeds ===
1. (Chinese Taipei) Lin Yun-ju / Liao Cheng-ting (quarter-finals)
2. (Hong Kong) Lam Siu Hang / Wong Chun Ting (first round)
3. (China) Lin Gaoyuan / Liang Jingkun (semi-finals)
4. (Chinese Taipei) Chuang Chih-yuan / Chen Chien-an (semi-finals)
5. (Japan) Maharu Yoshimura / Masataka Morizono (first round)
6. (China) Xu Xin / Fan Zhendong (champion)
7. (Poland) Jakub Dyjas / (Belgium) Cedric Nuytinck (first round)
8. (India) Sharath Kamal Achanta / Sathiyan Gnanasekaran (quarter-finals)

=== Draw ===
First round
1	(Chinese Taipei) Liao C-t (Chinese Taipei) Lin Y-j	w/o
(Slovakia) L Pistej (Slovakia) A Valuch
(Germany) R Filus (Germany) S Mengel	10	6	9
6	(China) Fan ZD (China) Xu X	12	11	11
8	(India) S K Achanta (India) S Gnanasekaran	12	11	7	11
(South Korea) Kim B-h (South Korea) Kim M-h	10	7	11	9
(Poland) M Badowski (Poland) P Zatowka	13	12	7	2	0
3	(China) Liang JK (China) Lin GY	11	10	11	11	11
4	(Chinese Taipei) Chen C-a (Chinese Taipei) Chuang C-y	11	11	11
(Slovakia) S Kaluzny (Slovakia) Wang Y	9	4	3
(Japan) S Togami (Japan) Y Uda	11	11	11
7	(Poland) J Dyjas (Belgium) C Nuytinck	6	8	2
5	(Japan) M Morizono (Japan) M Yoshimura	11	11	6	8	11
(Germany) B Duda (Germany) D Qiu	5	7	11	11	13
(Puerto Rico) B Afanador (Puerto Rico) D Gonzalez	11	8	4	11	11
2	(Hong Kong) Lam S H (Hong Kong) Wong C T	7	11	11	4	8

Quarterfinals
1	(Chinese Taipei) Liao C-t (Chinese Taipei) Lin Y-j	4	4	4
6	(China) Fan ZD (China) Xu X	11	11	11
8	(India) S K Achanta (India) S Gnanasekaran	8	11	4	9
3	(China) Liang JK (China) Lin GY	11	8	11	11
4	(Chinese Taipei) Chen C-a (Chinese Taipei) Chuang C-y	11	11	11
(Japan) S Togami (Japan) Y Uda	8	9	9
(Germany) B Duda (Germany) D Qiu	8	12	11	11
(Puerto Rico) B Afanador (Puerto Rico) D Gonzalez	11	10	6	8

Semifinals
6	(China) Fan ZD (China) Xu X	11	11	11
3	(China) Liang JK (China) Lin GY	5	8	5
4	(Chinese Taipei) Chen C-a (Chinese Taipei) Chuang C-y	7	11	9	1
(Germany) B Duda (Germany) D Qiu	11	9	11	11

Final
6	(China) Fan ZD (China) Xu X	12	11	11
(Germany) B Duda (Germany) D Qiu	10	9	7

== Women's doubles ==
=== Seeds ===
1. (China) Wang Manyu / Sun Yingsha (final)
2. (Hong Kong) Doo Hoi Kem / Soo Wai Yam (quarter-finals)
3. (Hong Kong) Lee Ho Ching / Ng Wing Nam (quarter-finals)
4. (Singapore) Zeng Jian / Lin Ye (first round)
5. (China) Chen Meng / Liu shiwen (champion)
6. (Chinese Taipei) Cheng Hsien-tzu / Chen Szu-yu (semi-finals)
7. (Chinese Taipei) Liu Hsing-yin / Li Yu-jhun (first round)
8. (Japan) Miyu Nagasaki / Miyuu Kihara (semi-finals)

=== Draw ===
First round
1	(China) Sun YS (China) Wang MY	11	11	7	11
(Puerto Rico) A Diaz (Puerto Rico) M Diaz	4	5	11	3
(South Korea) Choi H-j (South Korea) Kim J-h	11	11	12
7	(Chinese Taipei) Li Y-j (Chinese Taipei) Liu H-y	6	7	10
8	(Japan) M Kihara (Japan) M Nagasaki	13	11	11	11
(India) M Batra (India) M Patkar	15	1	4	1
(Japan) H Ojio (Japan) Y Soma	5	11	11	9	5
3	(Hong Kong) Lee H C (Hong Kong) Ng W N	11	8	5	11	11
4	(Singapore) Lin Y (Singapore) Zeng J	9	4	13	8
(Poland) N Bajor (Poland) N Partyka	11	11	11	11
(Norway) Ma W (United States) L Zhang	6	11	6	8
6	(Chinese Taipei) Chen S-y (Chinese Taipei) Cheng H-t	11	9	11	11
5	(China) Chen M (China) Liu SW	11	11	11
(Japan) K Idesawa (Japan) S Odo	8	7	3
(South Korea) Lee Y-j (South Korea) Park J-h	4	14	7	4
2	(Hong Kong) Doo H K (Hong Kong) Soo W Y	11	12	11	11

Quarterfinals
1	(China) Sun YS (China) Wang MY	11	11	11
(South Korea) Choi H-j (South Korea) Kim J-h	8	6	8
8	(Japan) M Kihara (Japan) M Nagasaki	11	11	2	11
3	(Hong Kong) Lee H C (Hong Kong) Ng W N	5	6	11	6
(Poland) N Bajor (Poland) N Partyka	9	11	5	9
6	(Chinese Taipei) Chen S-y (Chinese Taipei) Cheng H-t	11	7	11	11
5	(China) Chen M (China) Liu SW	11	11	11
2	(Hong Kong) Doo H K (Hong Kong) Soo W Y	6	7	9

Semifinals
1	(China) Sun YS (China) Wang MY	9	11	11	7	11
8	(Japan) M Kihara (Japan) M Nagasaki	11	3	8	11	6
6	(Chinese Taipei) Chen S-y (Chinese Taipei) Cheng H-t	5	3	11	6
5	(China) Chen M (China) Liu SW	11	11	9	11

Final
1	(China) Sun YS (China) Wang MY	9	6	11	9
5	(China) Chen M (China) Liu SW	11	11	7	11

== Mixed doubles ==
=== Seeds ===
1. (South Korea) Lee Sang-su / Jeon Ji-hee (quarter-finals)
2. (Hong Kong) Wong Chun Ting / Doo Hoi Kem (quarter-finals)
3. (Hong Kong) Ho Kwan Kit / Lee Ho Ching (first round)
4. (Chinese Taipei) Cheng I-ching / Lin Yun-ju (semi-finals)
5. (China) Xu Xin / Zhu Yuling (Champion)
6. (Hungary) Adam Szudi / Szandra Pergel (first round)
7. (Slovakia) Tatiana Kukulkova / Lubomir Pistej (first round)
8. (Japan) Mima Ito / Koki Niwa (quarter-finals)

=== Draw ===
First round
1	(South Korea) Lee S-s (South Korea) Jeon J-h	11	13	4	11
(Serbia) A Karakasevic (Serbia) I Lupulesku	6	11	11	5
(Japan) T Harimoto (Japan) H Hayata	w/o
7	(Slovakia) L Pistej (Slovakia) T Kukulkova
6	(Hungary) A Szudi (Hungary) S Pergel	4	11	7	4
(China) Fan ZD (China) Ding N	11	8	11	11
(South Korea) Cho D-s (South Korea) Shin Y-b	9	11	9	11	11
3	(Hong Kong) Ho K K (Hong Kong) Lee H C	11	7	11	9	9
4	(Chinese Taipei) Lin Y-j (Chinese Taipei) Cheng I-c	12	11	11
(Poland) M Badowski (Poland) N Bajol	10	7	9
(Puerto Rico) B Afanador (Puerto Rico) A Diaz	6	9	13	9
8	(Japan) K Niwa (Japan) M Ito	11	11	11	11
5	(China) Xu X (China) Zhu YL	11	11	11
(India) S K Achanta (India) M Batra	8	7	5
(Chinese Taipei) Peng W-w (Chinese Taipei) Liu H-y	3	6	6
2	(Hong Kong) Wong C T (Hong Kong) Doo H K	11	11	11

Quarterfinals
1	(South Korea) Lee S-s (South Korea) Jeon J-h	6	9	6
(Japan) T Harimoto (Japan) H Hayata	11	11	11
(China) Fan ZD (China) Ding N	11	11	11
(South Korea) Cho D-s (South Korea) Shin Y-b	5	7	5
4	(Chinese Taipei) Lin Y-j (Chinese Taipei) Cheng I-c	11	11	4	11
8	(Japan) K Niwa (Japan) M Ito	9	8	11	7
5	(China) Xu X (China) Zhu YL	9	11	11	11
2	(Hong Kong) Wong C T (Hong Kong) Doo H K	11	5	6	9

Semifinals
(Japan) T Harimoto (Japan) H Hayata	11	11	13	11
(China) Fan ZD (China) Ding N	7	9	15	9
4	(Chinese Taipei) Lin Y-j (Chinese Taipei) Cheng I-c	6	7	4
5	(China) Xu X (China) Zhu YL	11	11	11

Final
(Japan) T Harimoto (Japan) H Hayata	10	6	5
5	(China) Xu X (China) Zhu YL	12	11	11
