= 2019 Hungarian Open (table tennis) =

Tournament details
- Dates: 17–20 January 2019
- Competitors: 32S / 16D
- Total prize money: US$170,000
- Venue: Budapest Olympic Hall
- Location: Budapest, Hungary

Champions
- Men's singles: (China) Lin Gaoyuan
- Women's singles: (China) Chen Meng
- Men's doubles: (China) Liang Jingkun (China) Xu Xin
- Women's doubles: (China) Wang Manyu (China) Zhu Yuling
- Mixed doubles: (China) Xu Xin (China) Liu Shiwen

The 2019 Hungarian Open was the first event of the 2019 ITTF World Tour. It took place from 17–20 January in Budapest, Hungary.

== Men's singles ==
=== Seeds ===
1. (China) Fan Zhendong (semifinals)
2. (China) Xu Xin (semifinals)
3. (China) Lin Gaoyuan (champion)
4. (Brazil) Hugo Calderano (quarterfinals)
5. (Hong Kong) Wong Chun Ting (second round)
6. (Sweden) Mattias Falck (first round)
7. (Germany) Patrick Franziska (second round)
8. (England) Liam Pitchford (second round)
9. (Chinese Taipei) Chuang Chih-yuan (second round)
10. (Belarus) Vladimir Samsonov (quarterfinals)
11. (Denmark) Jonathan Groth (first round)
12. (South Korea) Lim Jong-hoon (quarterfinals)
13. (France) Simon Gauzy (second round)
14. (Sweden) Kristian Karlsson (second round)
15. (Portugal) Marcos Freitas (first round)
16. (Hungary) Bence Majoros (first round)

=== Draw ===
==== Top half ====
First round
1	(China) Fan Zhendong	8	11	11	11	10	12
(Kazakhstan) Kirill Gerassimenko	11	2	4	5	12	10
(China) Zhou Yu	12	8	12	9	6	dsq
9	(Chinese Taipei) Chuang Chih-yuan	10	11	10	11	11	11
16	(Hungary) Bence Majoros	8	8	3	7
(Russia) Alexander Shibaev	11	11	11	11
(France) Emmanuel Lebesson	5	11	11	2	5	8
5	(Hong Kong) Wong Chun Ting	11	9	8	11	11	11
6	(Sweden) Mattias Falck	8	7	4	4
(China) Wang Chuqin	11	11	11	11
(Croatia) Wei Shihao	11	7	11	10	5	11	9
13	(France) Simon Gauzy	9	11	7	12	11	7	11
14	(Sweden) Kristian Karlsson	11	11	11	11
(Greece) Panagiotis Gionis	7	9	8	3
(Chinese Taipei) Chen Chien-an	5	12	11	13	6	7
4	(Brazil) Hugo Calderano	11	10	9	15	11	11

Second round
1	(China) Fan Zhendong	11	15	11	11	7	14
9	(Chinese Taipei) Chuang Chih-yuan	9	17	7	9	11	12
(Russia) Alexander Shibaev	11	8	8	11	11	11
5	(Hong Kong) Wong Chun Ting	9	11	11	8	7	6
(China) Wang Chuqin	8	3	11	11	11	11
13	(France) Simon Gauzy	11	11	5	5	3	9
14	(Sweden) Kristian Karlsson	4	8	11	3	10
4	(Brazil) Hugo Calderano	11	11	8	11	12

Quarterfinals
1	(China) Fan Zhendong	11	11	6	11	11
(Russia) Alexander Shibaev	8	3	11	7	8
(China) Wang Chuqin	5	11	11	11	12	11
4	(Brazil) Hugo Calderano	11	6	8	4	14	5

Semifinals
1	(China) Fan Zhendong	11	7	11	11	10	11	9
(China) Wang Chuqin	7	11	13	5	12	3	11

==== Bottom half ====
First round
3	(China) Lin Gaoyuan	7	11	9	11	5	11	11
(China) Zhao Zihao	11	9	11	9	11	8	7
(China) Fang Bo	6	11	11	7	13	11
15	(Portugal) Marcos Freitas	11	9	4	11	11	5
10	(Belarus) Vladimir Samsonov	w/o
(Germany) Qiu Dang
(China) Zhou Qihao	12	11	7	6	11	7
7	(Germany) Patrick Franziska	14	8	11	11	8	11
8	(England) Liam Pitchford	12	11	11	11
(China) Yu Ziyang	10	9	4	7
(Sweden) Truls Moregard	9	6	13	8
12	(South Korea) Lim Jong-hoon	11	11	15	11
11	(Denmark) Jonathan Groth	11	7	10	10	7
(China) Liang Jingkun	4	11	12	12	11
(Germany) Benedikt Duda	5	3	11	5	13	15	5
2	(China) Xu Xin	11	11	7	11	11	13	11

Second round
3	(China) Lin Gaoyuan	11	11	4	8	11	12
(China) Fang Bo	8	9	11	11	9	10
10	(Belarus) Vladimir Samsonov	w/o
7	(Germany) Patrick Franziska
8	(England) Liam Pitchford	7	11	6	13	11	9	12
12	(South Korea) Lim Jong-hoon	11	9	11	11	8	11	14
(China) Liang Jingkun	6	8	11	12	11	6	11
2	(China) Xu Xin	11	11	7	10	9	11	13

Quarterfinals
3	(China) Lin Gaoyuan	10	11	7	11	12	11
10	(Belarus) Vladimir Samsonov	12	7	11	9	10	9
12	(South Korea) Lim Jong-hoon	11	9	7	8
2	(China) Xu Xin	13	11	11	11

Semifinals
3	(China) Lin Gaoyuan	14	11	11	11
2	(China) Xu Xin	12	9	6	9

==== Finals ====
Semifinals									Final
1	(China) Fan Zhendong	11	7	11	11	10	11	9
	(China) Wang Chuqin	7	11	13	5	12	3	11		(China) Wang Chuqin	11	10	8	9
3	(China) Lin Gaoyuan	14	11	11	11				3	(China) Lin Gaoyuan	13	12	11	11
2	(China) Xu Xin	12	9	6	9

== Women's singles ==
=== Seeds ===
1. (China) Zhu Yuling (final)
2. (China) Chen Meng (champion)
3. (China) Wang Manyu (semifinals)
4. (China) Liu Shiwen (semifinals)
5. (Singapore) Feng Tianwei (first round)
6. (China) Chen Xingtong (quarterfinals)
7. (Hong Kong) Doo Hoi Kem (first round)
8. (Austria) Sofia Polcanova (first round)
9. (South Korea) Jeon Ji-hee (first round)
10. (Romania) Bernadette Szőcs (quarterfinals)
11. (Canada) Zhang Mo (first round)
12. (Romania) Elizabeta Samara (second round)
13. (Netherlands) Li Jie (second round)
14. (Chinese Taipei) Chen Szu-yu (second round)
15. (Hungary) Georgina Póta (first round)
16. (Hungary) Dóra Madarász (first round)

=== Draw ===
==== Top half ====
First round
1	(China) Zhu Yuling	11	11	11	13
(China) He Zhuojia	6	6	2	11
(France) Laura Gasnier	9	4	11	7	11	2
14	(Chinese Taipei) Chen Szu-yu	11	11	5	11	4	11
13	(Netherlands) Li Jie	11	9	11	5	11	7	11
(China) Wang Yidi	7	11	9	11	7	11	8
(Czech Republic) Hana Matelová	6	7	10	11	2
6	(China) Chen Xingtong	11	11	12	6	11
5	(Singapore) Feng Tianwei	8	11	13	5	7
(China) Liu Gaoyang	11	9	15	11	11
(China) Sun Yingsha	9	11	11	11	12
9	(South Korea) Jeon Ji-hee	11	7	7	8	10
12	(Romania) Elizabeta Samara	11	11	9	11	1	12
(Singapore) Zeng Jian	6	7	11	4	11	10
(China) Zhang Rui	6	10	4	9
4	(China) Liu Shiwen	11	12	11	11

Second round
1	(China) Zhu Yuling	11	11	11	11
14	(Chinese Taipei) Chen Szu-yu	3	7	2	4
13	(Netherlands) Li Jie	3	4	8	4
6	(China) Chen Xingtong	11	11	11	11
(China) Liu Gaoyang	9	18	11	5	8	9
(China) Sun Yingsha	11	16	9	11	11	11
12	(Romania) Elizabeta Samara
4	(China) Liu Shiwen	w/o

Quarterfinals
1	(China) Zhu Yuling	11	11	11	11
6	(China) Chen Xingtong	4	4	8	8
(China) Sun Yingsha	6	8	9	11
4	(China) Liu Shiwen	11	11	11	13

Semifinals
1	(China) Zhu Yuling	5	11	8	8	11	11	12
4	(China) Liu Shiwen	11	9	11	11	6	9	10

==== Bottom half ====
First round
3	(China) Wang Manyu	11	11	12	11
(China) Chen Ke	7	7	10	4
(China) Sun Mingyang	11	11	9	13	12
11	(Canada) Zhang Mo	7	7	11	11	10
16	(Hungary) Dóra Madarász	8	9	9	11	11	5
(Portugal) Fu Yu	11	11	11	9	6	11
(Germany) Petrissa Solja	11	13	11	11
8	(Austria) Sofia Polcanova	9	11	1	6
7	(Hong Kong) Doo Hoi Kem	11	8	5	11	8	5
(Germany) Shan Xiaona	5	11	11	7	11	11
(Chinese Taipei) Cheng Hsien-tzu	9	11	11	11	11	14	13
10	(Romania) Bernadette Szőcs	11	8	9	13	1	16	15
15	(Hungary) Georgina Póta	12	10	9	11	8	11	10
(India) Manika Batra	10	12	11	6	11	8	12
(Singapore) Yu Mengyu	5	8	6	6
2	(China) Chen Meng	11	11	11	11

Second round
3	(China) Wang Manyu	11	11	3	11	11
(China) Sun Mingyang	7	1	11	4	3
(Portugal) Fu Yu	5	9	7	11	16	12	13
(Germany) Petrissa Solja	11	11	11	7	14	10	11
(Germany) Shan Xiaona	4	10	10	8
10	(Romania) Bernadette Szőcs	11	12	12	11
(India) Manika Batra	6	5	5	2
2	(China) Chen Meng	11	11	11	11

Quarterfinals
3	(China) Wang Manyu	11	11	8	11	11
(Portugal) Fu Yu	9	8	11	5	4
10	(Romania) Bernadette Szőcs	11	11	6	7	5	4
2	(China) Chen Meng	8	7	11	11	11	11

Semifinals
3	(China) Wang Manyu	9	9	7	11	5
2	(China) Chen Meng	11	11	11	7	11

==== Finals ====
Semifinals									Final
1	(China) Zhu Yuling	5	11	8	8	11	11	12
4	(China) Liu Shiwen	11	9	11	11	6	9	10	1	(China) Zhu Yuling	11	7	13	11	4	5
3	(China) Wang Manyu	9	9	7	11	5			2	(China) Chen Meng	9	11	11	13	11	11
2	(China) Chen Meng	11	11	11	7	11

== Men's doubles ==
=== Seeds ===
1. (Chinese Taipei) Liao Cheng-ting / Lin Yun-ju (quarterfinals)
2. (China) Fan Zhendong / Lin Gaoyuan (final)
3. (Hong Kong) Lam Siu Hang / Wong Chun Ting (semifinals)
4. (Hong Kong) Ho Kwan Kit / Ng Pak Nam (first round)
5. (China) Liang Jingkun / Xu Xin (champions)
6. (Chinese Taipei) Chen Chien-an / Chuang Chih-yuan (quarterfinals)
7. (Hungary) Nandor Ecseki / Adam Szudi (first round)
8. (Austria) Robert Gardos / Daniel Habesohn (first round)

=== Draw ===
First round
1	(Chinese Taipei) Liao / Lin	11	11	11
(India) Kamal / Gnanasekaran	9	7	6
(Czech Republic) Polanský / Širůček	7	2	8
5	(China) Liang / Xu	11	11	11
8	(Austria) Gardos / Habesohn	11	6	14	5
(France) Flore / Lebesson	6	11	16	11
(Germany) Duda / Filus	11	11	11
4	(Hong Kong) Ho / Ng	9	9	8
3	(Hong Kong) Lam / Wong	11	10	11	11
(Romania) Ionescu / (Spain) Robles	9	12	9	9
(Ukraine) Kou / (Croatia) Wei	11	11	11
7	(Hungary) Ecseki / Szudi	8	7	9
6	(Chinese Taipei) Chen / Chuang	11	11	9	11
(France) Robinot / Seyfried	7	8	11	9
(Slovenia) Kozul / Tokič
2	(China) Fan / Lin	w/o

Quarterfinals
1	(Chinese Taipei) Liao / Lin	8	11	7	6
5	(China) Liang / Xu	11	8	11	11
(France) Flore / Lebesson	11	11	14	14
(Germany) Duda / Filus	13	8	12	12
3	(Hong Kong) Lam / Wong	11	10	6	12	11
(Ukraine) Kou / (Croatia) Wei	6	12	11	10	7
6	(Chinese Taipei) Chen / Chuang	6	8	9
2	(China) Fan / Lin	11	11	11

Semifinals
5	(China) Liang / Xu	11	11	13
(France) Flore / Lebesson	6	7	11
3	(Hong Kong) Lam / Wong	11	7	14	7	3
2	(China) Fan / Lin	7	11	12	11	11

Final
5	(China) Liang / Xu	11	9	11	5	11
2	(China) Fan / Lin	5	11	7	11	8

== Women's doubles ==
=== Seeds ===
1. (China) Wang Manyu / Zhu Yuling (champions)
2. (Hong Kong) Doo Hoi Kem / Lee Ho Ching (semifinals)
3. (China) Chen Meng / Sun Yingsha (final)
4. (Hong Kong) Ng Wing Nam / Soo Wai Yam Minnie (quarterfinals)
5. (Slovakia) Barbora Balážová / (Czech Republic) Hana Matelová (quarterfinals)
6. (Sweden) Matilda Ekholm / (Hungary) Georgina Póta (quarterfinals)
7. (Romania) Elizabeta Samara / Bernadette Szőcs (semifinals)
8. (Singapore) Lin Ye / Yu Mengyu (quarterfinals)

=== Draw ===
First round
1	(China) Wang / Zhu	11	11	11
(Spain) Dvorak / Zhang	6	7	8
(Germany) Shan / Winter	6	7	11	7
8	(Singapore) Lin / Yu	11	11	8	11
7	(Romania) Samara / Szőcs	12	7	12	11
(France) Gasnier / Grundisch	10	11	10	6
(United States) Wu / Zhang	11	9	8
4	(Hong Kong) Ng / Soo	13	11	11
3	(China) Chen / Sun	11	9	11	11
(Russia) Noskova / (Austria) Polcanova	7	11	9	2
(Russia) Tailakova / Vorobeva	7	11	9	9
5	(Slovakia) Balážová / (Czech Republic) Matelová	11	5	11	11
6	(Sweden) Ekholm / (Hungary) Póta	13	8	12	11
(Romania) Ciobanu / Diaconu	11	11	10	6
(Hungary) Balint / Nagyvaradi	6	3	2
2	(Hong Kong) Doo / Lee	11	11	11

Quarterfinals
1	(China) Wang / Zhu	13	13	8	11
8	(Singapore) Lin / Yu	11	11	11	8
7	(Romania) Samara / Szőcs	11	5	12	11
4	(Hong Kong) Ng / Soo	7	11	10	5
3	(China) Chen / Sun	11	11	11
5	(Slovakia) Balážová / (Czech Republic) Matelová	3	2	9
6	(Sweden) Ekholm / (Hungary) Póta	11	9	9	6
2	(Hong Kong) Doo / Lee	8	11	11	11

Semifinals
1	(China) Wang / Zhu	w/o
7	(Romania) Samara / Szőcs
3	(China) Chen / Sun	w/o
2	(Hong Kong) Doo / Lee

Final
1	(China) Wang / Zhu	8	11	15	11
3	(China) Chen / Sun	11	7	13	2

== Mixed doubles ==
=== Seeds ===
1. (Hong Kong) Wong Chun Ting / Doo Hoi Kem (first round)
2. (Slovakia) Ľubomír Pištej / Barbora Balážová (semifinals)
3. (Chinese Taipei) Lin Yun-ju / Cheng I-ching (quarterfinals)
4. (Spain) Álvaro Robles / Galia Dvorak (first round)
5. (China) Xu Xin / Liu Shiwen (champions)
6. (Austria) Stefan Fegerl / Sofia Polcanova (quarterfinals)
7. (Sweden) Mattias Falck / Matilda Ekholm (first round)
8. (Hungary) Adam Szudi / Szandra Pergel (final)

=== Draw ===
First round
1	(Hong Kong) Wong / Doo	11	11	7	7
(France) Flore / Gasnier	13	9	11	11
(Hong Kong) Ho / Lee	11	6	11	5
8	(Hungary) Szudi / Pergel	13	11	1	11
7	(Sweden) Falck / Ekholm	11	18	3	11	9
(Russia) Shibaev / Mikhaylova	9	20	11	8	11
(Spain) Cantero / Xiao	5	11	9
3	(Chinese Taipei) Lin / Cheng	11	13	11
4	(Spain) Robles / Dvorak	9	5	12
(Germany) Franziska / Solja	11	11	14
(Italy) Stoyanov / Piccolin	8	6	6
5	(China) Xu / Liu	11	11	11
6	(Austria) Fegerl / Polcanova	11	11	11
(Brazil) Calderano / Takahashi	3	6	4
(Serbia) Karakašević / Lupulesku	11	11	11	5	8
2	(Slovakia) Pištej / Balážová	13	7	7	11	11

Quarterfinals
(France) Flore / Gasnier	5	9	11	8
8	(Hungary) Szudi / Pergel	11	11	6	11
(Russia) Shibaev / Mikhaylova	11	14	11
3	(Chinese Taipei) Lin / Cheng	8	12	5
(Germany) Franziska / Solja
5	(China) Xu / Liu	w/o
6	(Austria) Fegerl / Polcanova
2	(Slovakia) Pištej / Balážová	w/o

Semifinals
8	(Hungary) Szudi / Pergel	12	11	11
(Russia) Shibaev / Mikhaylova	10	7	4
5	(China) Xu / Liu	11	11	11
2	(Slovakia) Pištej / Balážová	8	4	7

Final
8	(Hungary) Szudi / Pergel	3	6	5
5	(China) Xu / Liu	11	11	11
