= 2019 ITTF World Tour =

Details
- Duration: 17 January 2019 – 15 December 2019
- Edition: 24th
- Tournaments: 12 + Grand Finals
- Categories: World Tour Platinum (6); World Tour (6)

Achievements (singles)
- Most titles: Men: (China) Xu Xin (3); Women: (China) Chen Meng (4)
- Most finals: Men: (China) Lin Gaoyuan (5); Women: (China) Chen Meng (4)
- Points leader: Men: (China) Lin Gaoyuan, 2044; Women: (China) Sun Yingsha, 1882

The 2019 ITTF World Tour was the 24th season of the International Table Tennis Federation's professional table tennis world tour.

== Schedule ==
The tournaments in the 2019 tour have been split into two tiers: World Tour Platinum and World Tour. The Platinum events offer higher prize money and more points towards the ITTF World Tour standings, which determine the qualifiers for the ITTF World Tour Grand Finals in December.

Below is the 2019 schedule announced by the International Table Tennis Federation:

Key

Grand Finals
World Tour Platinum
World Tour

No.	Date	Tournament	Location	Venue	Prize (USD)	Report	Ref.
1	17–20 January	(Hungary) Hungarian Open	Budapest	Budapest Olympic Hall	170,000	Report	
2	28–31 March	Qatar Open	Doha	Ali Bin Hamad al-Attiyah Arena	300,000	Report	
3	30 May–2 June	China Open	Shenzhen	Bao'an District Sports Center	400,000	Report	
4	6–9 June	Hong Kong Open	Hong Kong	Queen Elizabeth Stadium	175,000	Report	
5	14–16 June	Japan Open	Sapporo	Hokkai Kitayell	270,000	Report	
6	4–7 July	(South Korea) Korea Open	Busan	Sajik Indoor Gymnasium	150,000	Report	
7	11–14 July	(Australia) Australian Open	Geelong	Geelong Arena	332,000	Report	
8	15–18 August	Bulgaria Open	Panagyurishte	Arena Asarel	190,000	Report	
9	22–25 August	(Czech Republic) Czech Open	Olomouc	OMEGA Sport Center	190,000	Report	
10	3–6 October	(Sweden) Swedish Open	Stockholm	Eriksdalshallen	170,000	Report	
11	10–13 October	(Germany) German Open	Bremen	ÖVB Arena	270,000	Report	
12	14–17 November	(Austria) Austrian Open	Linz	TipsArena Linz	260,000	Report	
13	12–15 December	(China) Grand Finals	Zhengzhou	Zhengzhou Olympic Sports Center	1,001,000	Report	

== Results ==
Date	Tournament	Champions	Runners-up
17–20 January	Hungarian Open: Location: Budapest, Hungary; Venue: Budapest Olympic Hall; Category: World Tour; Prize: $170,000; Draws: 32MS/32WS/16MD/16WD/16XD; Singles: Men / Women; Doubles: Men / Women / Mixed	(China) Lin Gaoyuan	(China) Wang Chuqin
17–20 January	Hungarian Open: Location: Budapest, Hungary; Venue: Budapest Olympic Hall; Category: World Tour; Prize: $170,000; Draws: 32MS/32WS/16MD/16WD/16XD; Singles: Men / Women; Doubles: Men / Women / Mixed	Score: 4–0 (13–11, 12–10, 11–8, 11–9)	
17–20 January	Hungarian Open: Location: Budapest, Hungary; Venue: Budapest Olympic Hall; Category: World Tour; Prize: $170,000; Draws: 32MS/32WS/16MD/16WD/16XD; Singles: Men / Women; Doubles: Men / Women / Mixed	(China) Chen Meng	(China) Zhu Yuling
17–20 January	Hungarian Open: Location: Budapest, Hungary; Venue: Budapest Olympic Hall; Category: World Tour; Prize: $170,000; Draws: 32MS/32WS/16MD/16WD/16XD; Singles: Men / Women; Doubles: Men / Women / Mixed	Score: 4–2 (9–11, 11–7, 11–13, 13–11, 11–4, 11–5)	
17–20 January	Hungarian Open: Location: Budapest, Hungary; Venue: Budapest Olympic Hall; Category: World Tour; Prize: $170,000; Draws: 32MS/32WS/16MD/16WD/16XD; Singles: Men / Women; Doubles: Men / Women / Mixed	(China) Liang Jingkun (China) Xu Xin	(China) Fan Zhendong (China) Lin Gaoyuan
17–20 January	Hungarian Open: Location: Budapest, Hungary; Venue: Budapest Olympic Hall; Category: World Tour; Prize: $170,000; Draws: 32MS/32WS/16MD/16WD/16XD; Singles: Men / Women; Doubles: Men / Women / Mixed	Score: 3–2 (11–5, 9–11, 11–7, 5–11, 11–8)	
17–20 January	Hungarian Open: Location: Budapest, Hungary; Venue: Budapest Olympic Hall; Category: World Tour; Prize: $170,000; Draws: 32MS/32WS/16MD/16WD/16XD; Singles: Men / Women; Doubles: Men / Women / Mixed	(China) Wang Manyu (China) Zhu Yuling	(China) Chen Meng (China) Sun Yingsha
17–20 January	Hungarian Open: Location: Budapest, Hungary; Venue: Budapest Olympic Hall; Category: World Tour; Prize: $170,000; Draws: 32MS/32WS/16MD/16WD/16XD; Singles: Men / Women; Doubles: Men / Women / Mixed	Score: 3–1 (8–11, 11–7, 15–13, 11–2)	
17–20 January	Hungarian Open: Location: Budapest, Hungary; Venue: Budapest Olympic Hall; Category: World Tour; Prize: $170,000; Draws: 32MS/32WS/16MD/16WD/16XD; Singles: Men / Women; Doubles: Men / Women / Mixed	(China) Xu Xin (China) Liu Shiwen	(Hungary) Adam Szudi (Hungary) Szandra Pergel
17–20 January	Hungarian Open: Location: Budapest, Hungary; Venue: Budapest Olympic Hall; Category: World Tour; Prize: $170,000; Draws: 32MS/32WS/16MD/16WD/16XD; Singles: Men / Women; Doubles: Men / Women / Mixed	Score: 3–0 (11–3, 11–6, 11–5)	
28–31 March	Qatar Open: Location: Doha, Qatar; Venue: Ali Bin Hamad al-Attiyah Arena; Category: World Tour Platinum; Prize: $300,000; Draws: 32MS/32WS/16MD/16WD/16XD; Singles: Men / Women; Doubles: Men / Women / Mixed	(China) Ma Long	(China) Lin Gaoyuan
28–31 March	Qatar Open: Location: Doha, Qatar; Venue: Ali Bin Hamad al-Attiyah Arena; Category: World Tour Platinum; Prize: $300,000; Draws: 32MS/32WS/16MD/16WD/16XD; Singles: Men / Women; Doubles: Men / Women / Mixed	Score: 4–2 (9–11, 8–11, 11–5, 11–5, 11–9, 11–9)	
28–31 March	Qatar Open: Location: Doha, Qatar; Venue: Ali Bin Hamad al-Attiyah Arena; Category: World Tour Platinum; Prize: $300,000; Draws: 32MS/32WS/16MD/16WD/16XD; Singles: Men / Women; Doubles: Men / Women / Mixed	(China) Wang Manyu	(China) Liu Shiwen
28–31 March	Qatar Open: Location: Doha, Qatar; Venue: Ali Bin Hamad al-Attiyah Arena; Category: World Tour Platinum; Prize: $300,000; Draws: 32MS/32WS/16MD/16WD/16XD; Singles: Men / Women; Doubles: Men / Women / Mixed	Score: 4–2 (11–3, 10–12, 12–10, 11–6, 5–11, 11–5)	
28–31 March	Qatar Open: Location: Doha, Qatar; Venue: Ali Bin Hamad al-Attiyah Arena; Category: World Tour Platinum; Prize: $300,000; Draws: 32MS/32WS/16MD/16WD/16XD; Singles: Men / Women; Doubles: Men / Women / Mixed	(Hong Kong) Ho Kwan Kit (Hong Kong) Wong Chun Ting	(Germany) Timo Boll (Germany) Patrick Franziska
28–31 March	Qatar Open: Location: Doha, Qatar; Venue: Ali Bin Hamad al-Attiyah Arena; Category: World Tour Platinum; Prize: $300,000; Draws: 32MS/32WS/16MD/16WD/16XD; Singles: Men / Women; Doubles: Men / Women / Mixed	Score: 3–1 (11–4, 7–11, 11–9, 11–9)	
28–31 March	Qatar Open: Location: Doha, Qatar; Venue: Ali Bin Hamad al-Attiyah Arena; Category: World Tour Platinum; Prize: $300,000; Draws: 32MS/32WS/16MD/16WD/16XD; Singles: Men / Women; Doubles: Men / Women / Mixed	(China) Sun Yingsha (China) Wang Manyu	(China) Ding Ning (China) Wang Yidi
28–31 March	Qatar Open: Location: Doha, Qatar; Venue: Ali Bin Hamad al-Attiyah Arena; Category: World Tour Platinum; Prize: $300,000; Draws: 32MS/32WS/16MD/16WD/16XD; Singles: Men / Women; Doubles: Men / Women / Mixed	Score: 3–2 (12–14, 16–14, 11–6, 11–13, 11–4)	
28–31 March	Qatar Open: Location: Doha, Qatar; Venue: Ali Bin Hamad al-Attiyah Arena; Category: World Tour Platinum; Prize: $300,000; Draws: 32MS/32WS/16MD/16WD/16XD; Singles: Men / Women; Doubles: Men / Women / Mixed	(China) Xu Xin (China) Liu Shiwen	(Japan) Masataka Morizono (Japan) Mima Ito
28–31 March	Qatar Open: Location: Doha, Qatar; Venue: Ali Bin Hamad al-Attiyah Arena; Category: World Tour Platinum; Prize: $300,000; Draws: 32MS/32WS/16MD/16WD/16XD; Singles: Men / Women; Doubles: Men / Women / Mixed	Score: 3–0 (11–5, 11–7, 11–7)	
30 May–2 June	China Open: Location: Shenzhen, China; Venue: Bao'an District Sports Center; Category: World Tour Platinum; Prize: $400,000; Draws: 32MS/32WS/16MD/16WD/16XD	(China) Ma Long	(China) Lin Gaoyuan
30 May–2 June	China Open: Location: Shenzhen, China; Venue: Bao'an District Sports Center; Category: World Tour Platinum; Prize: $400,000; Draws: 32MS/32WS/16MD/16WD/16XD	Score: 4–0 (12–10, 11–6, 11–5, 11–4)	
30 May–2 June	China Open: Location: Shenzhen, China; Venue: Bao'an District Sports Center; Category: World Tour Platinum; Prize: $400,000; Draws: 32MS/32WS/16MD/16WD/16XD	(China) Chen Meng	(China) Wang Manyu
30 May–2 June	China Open: Location: Shenzhen, China; Venue: Bao'an District Sports Center; Category: World Tour Platinum; Prize: $400,000; Draws: 32MS/32WS/16MD/16WD/16XD	Score: 4–1 (11–3, 8–11, 11–9, 11–9, 11–7)	
30 May–2 June	China Open: Location: Shenzhen, China; Venue: Bao'an District Sports Center; Category: World Tour Platinum; Prize: $400,000; Draws: 32MS/32WS/16MD/16WD/16XD	(Germany) Timo Boll (Germany) Patrick Franziska	(China) Ma Long (China) Wang Chuqin
30 May–2 June	China Open: Location: Shenzhen, China; Venue: Bao'an District Sports Center; Category: World Tour Platinum; Prize: $400,000; Draws: 32MS/32WS/16MD/16WD/16XD	Score: 3–0 (11–8, 11–7, 11–5)	
30 May–2 June	China Open: Location: Shenzhen, China; Venue: Bao'an District Sports Center; Category: World Tour Platinum; Prize: $400,000; Draws: 32MS/32WS/16MD/16WD/16XD	(China) Gu Yuting (China) Liu Shiwen	(China) Wang Manyu (China) Zhu Yuling
30 May–2 June	China Open: Location: Shenzhen, China; Venue: Bao'an District Sports Center; Category: World Tour Platinum; Prize: $400,000; Draws: 32MS/32WS/16MD/16WD/16XD	Score: 3–0 (11–7, 12–10, 11–9)	
30 May–2 June	China Open: Location: Shenzhen, China; Venue: Bao'an District Sports Center; Category: World Tour Platinum; Prize: $400,000; Draws: 32MS/32WS/16MD/16WD/16XD	(Chinese Taipei) Lin Yun-ju (Chinese Taipei) Cheng I-ching	(Hong Kong) Wong Chun Ting (Hong Kong) Doo Hoi Kem
30 May–2 June	China Open: Location: Shenzhen, China; Venue: Bao'an District Sports Center; Category: World Tour Platinum; Prize: $400,000; Draws: 32MS/32WS/16MD/16WD/16XD	Score: 3–1 (10–12, 11–6, 11–1, 11–5)	
6–9 June	Hong Kong Open: Location: Hong Kong; Venue: Queen Elizabeth Stadium; Category: World Tour; Prize: $175,000; Draws: 32MS/32WS/16MD/16WD/16XD	(China) Lin Gaoyuan	(Japan) Tomokazu Harimoto
6–9 June	Hong Kong Open: Location: Hong Kong; Venue: Queen Elizabeth Stadium; Category: World Tour; Prize: $175,000; Draws: 32MS/32WS/16MD/16WD/16XD	Score: 4–2 (11–3, 7–11, 8–11, 11–6, 11–9, 11–7)	
6–9 June	Hong Kong Open: Location: Hong Kong; Venue: Queen Elizabeth Stadium; Category: World Tour; Prize: $175,000; Draws: 32MS/32WS/16MD/16WD/16XD	(China) Wang Yidi	(Japan) Mima Ito
6–9 June	Hong Kong Open: Location: Hong Kong; Venue: Queen Elizabeth Stadium; Category: World Tour; Prize: $175,000; Draws: 32MS/32WS/16MD/16WD/16XD	Score: 4–0 (11–3, 11–7, 11–5, 11–6)	
6–9 June	Hong Kong Open: Location: Hong Kong; Venue: Queen Elizabeth Stadium; Category: World Tour; Prize: $175,000; Draws: 32MS/32WS/16MD/16WD/16XD	(China) Liang Jingkun (China) Lin Gaoyuan	(South Korea) Jang Woo-jin (South Korea) Lim Jong-hoon
6–9 June	Hong Kong Open: Location: Hong Kong; Venue: Queen Elizabeth Stadium; Category: World Tour; Prize: $175,000; Draws: 32MS/32WS/16MD/16WD/16XD	Score: 3–1 (6–11, 11–6, 12–10, 11–8)	
6–9 June	Hong Kong Open: Location: Hong Kong; Venue: Queen Elizabeth Stadium; Category: World Tour; Prize: $175,000; Draws: 32MS/32WS/16MD/16WD/16XD	(China) Chen Ke (China) Mu Zi	(South Korea) Jeon Ji-hee (South Korea) Yoo Eun-chong
6–9 June	Hong Kong Open: Location: Hong Kong; Venue: Queen Elizabeth Stadium; Category: World Tour; Prize: $175,000; Draws: 32MS/32WS/16MD/16WD/16XD	Score: 3–1 (9–11, 11–1, 11–4, 11–5)	
6–9 June	Hong Kong Open: Location: Hong Kong; Venue: Queen Elizabeth Stadium; Category: World Tour; Prize: $175,000; Draws: 32MS/32WS/16MD/16WD/16XD	(Chinese Taipei) Lin Yun-ju (Chinese Taipei) Cheng I-ching	(South Korea) Lee Sang-su (South Korea) Choi Hyo-joo
6–9 June	Hong Kong Open: Location: Hong Kong; Venue: Queen Elizabeth Stadium; Category: World Tour; Prize: $175,000; Draws: 32MS/32WS/16MD/16WD/16XD	Score: 3–0 (11–8, 11–3, 11–7)	
14–16 June	Japan Open: Location: Sapporo, Japan; Venue: Hokkai Kitayell; Category: World Tour; Prize: $400,000; Draws: 32MS/32WS/16MD/16WD/16XD	(China) Xu Xin	(Chinese Taipei) Lin Yun-ju
14–16 June	Japan Open: Location: Sapporo, Japan; Venue: Hokkai Kitayell; Category: World Tour; Prize: $400,000; Draws: 32MS/32WS/16MD/16WD/16XD	Score: 4–1 (11–9, 14–12, 8–11, 11–3, 11–8)	
14–16 June	Japan Open: Location: Sapporo, Japan; Venue: Hokkai Kitayell; Category: World Tour; Prize: $400,000; Draws: 32MS/32WS/16MD/16WD/16XD	(China) Sun Yingsha	(China) Liu Shiwen
14–16 June	Japan Open: Location: Sapporo, Japan; Venue: Hokkai Kitayell; Category: World Tour; Prize: $400,000; Draws: 32MS/32WS/16MD/16WD/16XD	Score: 4–3 (11–4, 11–9, 4–11, 6–11, 7–11, 11–8, 11–3)	
14–16 June	Japan Open: Location: Sapporo, Japan; Venue: Hokkai Kitayell; Category: World Tour; Prize: $400,000; Draws: 32MS/32WS/16MD/16WD/16XD	(China) Fan Zhendong (China) Xu Xin	(Germany) Benedikt Duda (Germany) Qiu Dang
14–16 June	Japan Open: Location: Sapporo, Japan; Venue: Hokkai Kitayell; Category: World Tour; Prize: $400,000; Draws: 32MS/32WS/16MD/16WD/16XD	Score: 3–0 (12–10, 11–9, 11–7)	
14–16 June	Japan Open: Location: Sapporo, Japan; Venue: Hokkai Kitayell; Category: World Tour; Prize: $400,000; Draws: 32MS/32WS/16MD/16WD/16XD	(China) Chen Meng (China) Liu Shiwen	(China) Sun Yingsha (China) Wang Manyu
14–16 June	Japan Open: Location: Sapporo, Japan; Venue: Hokkai Kitayell; Category: World Tour; Prize: $400,000; Draws: 32MS/32WS/16MD/16WD/16XD	Score: 3–1 (11–9, 11–6, 7–11, 11–9)	
14–16 June	Japan Open: Location: Sapporo, Japan; Venue: Hokkai Kitayell; Category: World Tour; Prize: $400,000; Draws: 32MS/32WS/16MD/16WD/16XD	(China) Xu Xin (China) Zhu Yuling	(Japan) Tomokazu Harimoto (Japan) Hina Hayata
14–16 June	Japan Open: Location: Sapporo, Japan; Venue: Hokkai Kitayell; Category: World Tour; Prize: $400,000; Draws: 32MS/32WS/16MD/16WD/16XD	Score: 3–0 (12–10, 11–6, 11–5)	
4–7 July	Korea Open: Location: Busan, South Korea; Venue: Sajik Indoor Gymnasium; Category: World Tour; Prize: $150,000; Draws: 32MS/32WS/16MD/16WD/16XD	(China) Xu Xin	(China) Ma Long
4–7 July	Korea Open: Location: Busan, South Korea; Venue: Sajik Indoor Gymnasium; Category: World Tour; Prize: $150,000; Draws: 32MS/32WS/16MD/16WD/16XD	Score: 4–1 (7–11, 11–6, 11–9, 11–7, 11–8)	
4–7 July	Korea Open: Location: Busan, South Korea; Venue: Sajik Indoor Gymnasium; Category: World Tour; Prize: $150,000; Draws: 32MS/32WS/16MD/16WD/16XD	(China) Chen Meng	(China) Ding Ning
4–7 July	Korea Open: Location: Busan, South Korea; Venue: Sajik Indoor Gymnasium; Category: World Tour; Prize: $150,000; Draws: 32MS/32WS/16MD/16WD/16XD	Score: 4–1 (11–5, 11–6, 11–5, 7–11, 11–9)	
4–7 July	Korea Open: Location: Busan, South Korea; Venue: Sajik Indoor Gymnasium; Category: World Tour; Prize: $150,000; Draws: 32MS/32WS/16MD/16WD/16XD	(China) Fan Zhendong (China) Xu Xin	(South Korea) Jeoung Young-sik (South Korea) Lee Sang-su
4–7 July	Korea Open: Location: Busan, South Korea; Venue: Sajik Indoor Gymnasium; Category: World Tour; Prize: $150,000; Draws: 32MS/32WS/16MD/16WD/16XD	Score: 3–0 (11–9, 11–7, 11–6)	
4–7 July	Korea Open: Location: Busan, South Korea; Venue: Sajik Indoor Gymnasium; Category: World Tour; Prize: $150,000; Draws: 32MS/32WS/16MD/16WD/16XD	(China) Chen Meng (China) Wang Manyu	(South Korea) Choi Hyo-joo (South Korea) Yang Ha-eun
4–7 July	Korea Open: Location: Busan, South Korea; Venue: Sajik Indoor Gymnasium; Category: World Tour; Prize: $150,000; Draws: 32MS/32WS/16MD/16WD/16XD	Score: 3–0 (12–10, 15–13, 11–6)	
4–7 July	Korea Open: Location: Busan, South Korea; Venue: Sajik Indoor Gymnasium; Category: World Tour; Prize: $150,000; Draws: 32MS/32WS/16MD/16WD/16XD	(Hong Kong) Wong Chun Ting (Hong Kong) Doo Hoi Kem	(China) Xu Xin (China) Liu Shiwen
4–7 July	Korea Open: Location: Busan, South Korea; Venue: Sajik Indoor Gymnasium; Category: World Tour; Prize: $150,000; Draws: 32MS/32WS/16MD/16WD/16XD	Score: 3–1 (11–9, 11–8, 6–11, 13–11)	
11–14 July	Australian Open: Location: Geelong, Australia; Venue: Geelong Arena; Category: World Tour Platinum; Prize: $332,000; Draws: 32MS/32WS/16MD/16WD/16XD	(China) Xu Xin	(China) Wang Chuqin
11–14 July	Australian Open: Location: Geelong, Australia; Venue: Geelong Arena; Category: World Tour Platinum; Prize: $332,000; Draws: 32MS/32WS/16MD/16WD/16XD	Score: 4–0 (11–6, 11–8, 11–4, 11–8)	
11–14 July	Australian Open: Location: Geelong, Australia; Venue: Geelong Arena; Category: World Tour Platinum; Prize: $332,000; Draws: 32MS/32WS/16MD/16WD/16XD	(China) Sun Yingsha	(China) Ding Ning
11–14 July	Australian Open: Location: Geelong, Australia; Venue: Geelong Arena; Category: World Tour Platinum; Prize: $332,000; Draws: 32MS/32WS/16MD/16WD/16XD	Score: 4–0 (11–1, 11–9, 11–9, 11–9)	
11–14 July	Australian Open: Location: Geelong, Australia; Venue: Geelong Arena; Category: World Tour Platinum; Prize: $332,000; Draws: 32MS/32WS/16MD/16WD/16XD	(South Korea) Jeoung Young-sik (South Korea) Lee Sang-su	(China) Lin Gaoyuan (China) Ma Long
11–14 July	Australian Open: Location: Geelong, Australia; Venue: Geelong Arena; Category: World Tour Platinum; Prize: $332,000; Draws: 32MS/32WS/16MD/16WD/16XD	Score: 3–0 (11–6, 11–8, 11–6)	
11–14 July	Australian Open: Location: Geelong, Australia; Venue: Geelong Arena; Category: World Tour Platinum; Prize: $332,000; Draws: 32MS/32WS/16MD/16WD/16XD	(China) Chen Meng (China) Wang Manyu	(South Korea) Jeon Ji-hee (South Korea) Yang Ha-eun
11–14 July	Australian Open: Location: Geelong, Australia; Venue: Geelong Arena; Category: World Tour Platinum; Prize: $332,000; Draws: 32MS/32WS/16MD/16WD/16XD	Score: 3–1 (11–6, 11–6, 8–11, 11–6)	
11–14 July	Australian Open: Location: Geelong, Australia; Venue: Geelong Arena; Category: World Tour Platinum; Prize: $332,000; Draws: 32MS/32WS/16MD/16WD/16XD	(Hong Kong) Wong Chun Ting (Hong Kong) Doo Hoi Kem	(Japan) Jun Mizutani (Japan) Mima Ito
11–14 July	Australian Open: Location: Geelong, Australia; Venue: Geelong Arena; Category: World Tour Platinum; Prize: $332,000; Draws: 32MS/32WS/16MD/16WD/16XD	Score: 3–1 (5–11, 13–11, 11–8, 11–9)	
15–18 August	Bulgaria Open: Location: Panagyurishte, Bulgaria; Venue: Arena Asarel; Category: World Tour; Prize: $190,000; Draws: 32MS/32WS/16MD/16WD/16XD	(Japan) Tomokazu Harimoto	(China) Zhao Zihao
15–18 August	Bulgaria Open: Location: Panagyurishte, Bulgaria; Venue: Arena Asarel; Category: World Tour; Prize: $190,000; Draws: 32MS/32WS/16MD/16WD/16XD	Score: 4–2 (11–6, 12–14, 11–5, 13–11, 13–15, 11–4)	
15–18 August	Bulgaria Open: Location: Panagyurishte, Bulgaria; Venue: Arena Asarel; Category: World Tour; Prize: $190,000; Draws: 32MS/32WS/16MD/16WD/16XD	(China) Chen Xingtong	(China) He Zhuojia
15–18 August	Bulgaria Open: Location: Panagyurishte, Bulgaria; Venue: Arena Asarel; Category: World Tour; Prize: $190,000; Draws: 32MS/32WS/16MD/16WD/16XD	Score: 4–1 (11–4, 7–11, 12–10, 11–6, 11–4)	
15–18 August	Bulgaria Open: Location: Panagyurishte, Bulgaria; Venue: Arena Asarel; Category: World Tour; Prize: $190,000; Draws: 32MS/32WS/16MD/16WD/16XD	(South Korea) Jeoung Young-sik (South Korea) Lee Sang-su	(Japan) Yukiya Uda (Japan) Kazuhiro Yoshimura
15–18 August	Bulgaria Open: Location: Panagyurishte, Bulgaria; Venue: Arena Asarel; Category: World Tour; Prize: $190,000; Draws: 32MS/32WS/16MD/16WD/16XD	Score: 3–1 (4–11, 11–4, 11–9, 11–8)	
15–18 August	Bulgaria Open: Location: Panagyurishte, Bulgaria; Venue: Arena Asarel; Category: World Tour; Prize: $190,000; Draws: 32MS/32WS/16MD/16WD/16XD	(China) Gu Yuting (China) Mu Zi	(Japan) Miu Hirano (Japan) Saki Shibata
15–18 August	Bulgaria Open: Location: Panagyurishte, Bulgaria; Venue: Arena Asarel; Category: World Tour; Prize: $190,000; Draws: 32MS/32WS/16MD/16WD/16XD	Score: 3–0 (11–7, 11–6, 11–5)	
15–18 August	Bulgaria Open: Location: Panagyurishte, Bulgaria; Venue: Arena Asarel; Category: World Tour; Prize: $190,000; Draws: 32MS/32WS/16MD/16WD/16XD	(Japan) Jun Mizutani (Japan) Mima Ito	(China) Ma Te (China) Wu Yang
15–18 August	Bulgaria Open: Location: Panagyurishte, Bulgaria; Venue: Arena Asarel; Category: World Tour; Prize: $190,000; Draws: 32MS/32WS/16MD/16WD/16XD	Score: 3–1 (11–8, 12–10, 9–11, 11–9)	
22–25 August	Czech Open: Location: Olomouc, Czech Republic; Venue: OMEGA Sport Center; Category: World Tour; Prize: $190,000; Draws: 32MS/32WS/16MD/16WD/16XD	(Chinese Taipei) Lin Yun-ju	(Germany) Dimitrij Ovtcharov
22–25 August	Czech Open: Location: Olomouc, Czech Republic; Venue: OMEGA Sport Center; Category: World Tour; Prize: $190,000; Draws: 32MS/32WS/16MD/16WD/16XD	Score: 4–1 (11–9, 11–5, 4–11, 11–5, 11–9)	
22–25 August	Czech Open: Location: Olomouc, Czech Republic; Venue: OMEGA Sport Center; Category: World Tour; Prize: $190,000; Draws: 32MS/32WS/16MD/16WD/16XD	(China) Chen Xingtong	(Japan) Miu Hirano
22–25 August	Czech Open: Location: Olomouc, Czech Republic; Venue: OMEGA Sport Center; Category: World Tour; Prize: $190,000; Draws: 32MS/32WS/16MD/16WD/16XD	Score: 4–3 (11–5, 11–8, 11–7, 8–11, 12–14, 8–11, 11–8)	
22–25 August	Czech Open: Location: Olomouc, Czech Republic; Venue: OMEGA Sport Center; Category: World Tour; Prize: $190,000; Draws: 32MS/32WS/16MD/16WD/16XD	(South Korea) Cho Dae-seong (South Korea) Lee Sang-su	(Chinese Taipei) Liao Cheng-Ting (Chinese Taipei) Lin Yun-ju
22–25 August	Czech Open: Location: Olomouc, Czech Republic; Venue: OMEGA Sport Center; Category: World Tour; Prize: $190,000; Draws: 32MS/32WS/16MD/16WD/16XD	Score: 3–1 (11–4, 11–8, 7–11, 11–6)	
22–25 August	Czech Open: Location: Olomouc, Czech Republic; Venue: OMEGA Sport Center; Category: World Tour; Prize: $190,000; Draws: 32MS/32WS/16MD/16WD/16XD	(China) Gu Yuting (China) Mu Zi	(Japan) Miu Hirano (Japan) Saki Shibata
22–25 August	Czech Open: Location: Olomouc, Czech Republic; Venue: OMEGA Sport Center; Category: World Tour; Prize: $190,000; Draws: 32MS/32WS/16MD/16WD/16XD	Score: 3–1 (9–11, 11–7, 11–6, 11–6)	
22–25 August	Czech Open: Location: Olomouc, Czech Republic; Venue: OMEGA Sport Center; Category: World Tour; Prize: $190,000; Draws: 32MS/32WS/16MD/16WD/16XD	(South Korea) Cho Dae-seong (South Korea) Shin Yu-bin	(Japan) Jun Mizutani (Japan) Mima Ito
22–25 August	Czech Open: Location: Olomouc, Czech Republic; Venue: OMEGA Sport Center; Category: World Tour; Prize: $190,000; Draws: 32MS/32WS/16MD/16WD/16XD	Score: 3–2 (6–11, 15–13, 12–10, 16–18, 12–10)	
3–6 October	Swedish Open: Location: Stockholm, Sweden; Venue: Eriksdalshallen; Category: World Tour; Prize: $170,000; Draws: 32MS/32WS/16MD/16WD/16XD	(China) Wang Chuqin	(China) Lin Gaoyuan
3–6 October	Swedish Open: Location: Stockholm, Sweden; Venue: Eriksdalshallen; Category: World Tour; Prize: $170,000; Draws: 32MS/32WS/16MD/16WD/16XD	Score: 4–0 (11–8, 11–5, 11–8, 11–9)	
3–6 October	Swedish Open: Location: Stockholm, Sweden; Venue: Eriksdalshallen; Category: World Tour; Prize: $170,000; Draws: 32MS/32WS/16MD/16WD/16XD	(China) Chen Meng	(Japan) Mima Ito
3–6 October	Swedish Open: Location: Stockholm, Sweden; Venue: Eriksdalshallen; Category: World Tour; Prize: $170,000; Draws: 32MS/32WS/16MD/16WD/16XD	Score: 4–3 (8–11, 11–6, 7–11, 10–12, 11–8, 11–9, 11–5)	
3–6 October	Swedish Open: Location: Stockholm, Sweden; Venue: Eriksdalshallen; Category: World Tour; Prize: $170,000; Draws: 32MS/32WS/16MD/16WD/16XD	(China) Fan Zhendong (China) Xu Xin	(China) Liang Jingkun (China) Lin Gaoyuan
3–6 October	Swedish Open: Location: Stockholm, Sweden; Venue: Eriksdalshallen; Category: World Tour; Prize: $170,000; Draws: 32MS/32WS/16MD/16WD/16XD	Score: 3–2 (10–12, 11–1, 11–9, 11–13, 11–5)	
3–6 October	Swedish Open: Location: Stockholm, Sweden; Venue: Eriksdalshallen; Category: World Tour; Prize: $170,000; Draws: 32MS/32WS/16MD/16WD/16XD	(China) Chen Meng (China) Ding Ning	(Japan) Miu Hirano (Japan) Kasumi Ishikawa
3–6 October	Swedish Open: Location: Stockholm, Sweden; Venue: Eriksdalshallen; Category: World Tour; Prize: $170,000; Draws: 32MS/32WS/16MD/16WD/16XD	Score: 3–1 (5–11, 11–5, 11–8, 11–4)	
3–6 October	Swedish Open: Location: Stockholm, Sweden; Venue: Eriksdalshallen; Category: World Tour; Prize: $170,000; Draws: 32MS/32WS/16MD/16WD/16XD	(China) Xu Xin (China) Liu Shiwen	(Japan) Jun Mizutani (Japan) Mima Ito
3–6 October	Swedish Open: Location: Stockholm, Sweden; Venue: Eriksdalshallen; Category: World Tour; Prize: $170,000; Draws: 32MS/32WS/16MD/16WD/16XD	Score: 3–2 (8–11, 11–8, 13–11, 3–11, 11–9)	
10–13 October	German Open: Location: Bremen, Germany; Venue: ÖVB Arena; Category: World Tour Platinum; Prize: $270,000; Draws: 32MS/32WS/16MD/16WD/16XD	(China) Fan Zhendong	(China) Xu Xin
10–13 October	German Open: Location: Bremen, Germany; Venue: ÖVB Arena; Category: World Tour Platinum; Prize: $270,000; Draws: 32MS/32WS/16MD/16WD/16XD	Score: 4–1 (5–11, 11–8, 14–12, 11–7, 11–7)	
10–13 October	German Open: Location: Bremen, Germany; Venue: ÖVB Arena; Category: World Tour Platinum; Prize: $270,000; Draws: 32MS/32WS/16MD/16WD/16XD	(China) Sun Yingsha	(Japan) Mima Ito
10–13 October	German Open: Location: Bremen, Germany; Venue: ÖVB Arena; Category: World Tour Platinum; Prize: $270,000; Draws: 32MS/32WS/16MD/16WD/16XD	Score: 4–1 (11–3, 9–11, 11–5, 11–5, 11–4)	
10–13 October	German Open: Location: Bremen, Germany; Venue: ÖVB Arena; Category: World Tour Platinum; Prize: $270,000; Draws: 32MS/32WS/16MD/16WD/16XD	(China) Liang Jingkun (China) Xu Xin	(Germany) Benedikt Duda (Germany) Dang Qiu
10–13 October	German Open: Location: Bremen, Germany; Venue: ÖVB Arena; Category: World Tour Platinum; Prize: $270,000; Draws: 32MS/32WS/16MD/16WD/16XD	Score: 3–1 (11–13, 11–9, 11–9, 11–5)	
10–13 October	German Open: Location: Bremen, Germany; Venue: ÖVB Arena; Category: World Tour Platinum; Prize: $270,000; Draws: 32MS/32WS/16MD/16WD/16XD	(South Korea) Jeon Ji-hee (South Korea) Yang Ha-eun	(Japan) Miyuu Kihara (Japan) Miyu Nagasaki
10–13 October	German Open: Location: Bremen, Germany; Venue: ÖVB Arena; Category: World Tour Platinum; Prize: $270,000; Draws: 32MS/32WS/16MD/16WD/16XD	Score: 3–1 (11–5, 4–11, 11–9, 11–7)	
10–13 October	German Open: Location: Bremen, Germany; Venue: ÖVB Arena; Category: World Tour Platinum; Prize: $270,000; Draws: 32MS/32WS/16MD/16WD/16XD	(China) Xu Xin (China) Sun Yingsha	(China) Wang Chuqin (China) Wang Manyu
10–13 October	German Open: Location: Bremen, Germany; Venue: ÖVB Arena; Category: World Tour Platinum; Prize: $270,000; Draws: 32MS/32WS/16MD/16WD/16XD	Score: 3–1 (12–10, 11–7, 5–11, 11–7)	
14–17 November	Austrian Open: Location: Linz, Austria; Venue: TipsArena Linz; Category: World Tour Platinum; Prize: $260,000; Draws: 32MS/32WS/16MD/16WD/16XD	(China) Fan Zhendong	(China) Zhao Zihao
14–17 November	Austrian Open: Location: Linz, Austria; Venue: TipsArena Linz; Category: World Tour Platinum; Prize: $260,000; Draws: 32MS/32WS/16MD/16WD/16XD	Score: 4–0 (12–10, 11–6, 11–6, 11–5)	
14–17 November	Austrian Open: Location: Linz, Austria; Venue: TipsArena Linz; Category: World Tour Platinum; Prize: $260,000; Draws: 32MS/32WS/16MD/16WD/16XD	(Japan) Mima Ito	(China) Zhu Yuling
14–17 November	Austrian Open: Location: Linz, Austria; Venue: TipsArena Linz; Category: World Tour Platinum; Prize: $260,000; Draws: 32MS/32WS/16MD/16WD/16XD	Score: 4–1 (11–5, 16–18, 11–7, 13–11, 12–10)	
14–17 November	Austrian Open: Location: Linz, Austria; Venue: TipsArena Linz; Category: World Tour Platinum; Prize: $260,000; Draws: 32MS/32WS/16MD/16WD/16XD	(China) Liang Jingkun (China) Lin Gaoyuan	(South Korea) Jeoung Young-sik (South Korea) Lee Sang-su
14–17 November	Austrian Open: Location: Linz, Austria; Venue: TipsArena Linz; Category: World Tour Platinum; Prize: $260,000; Draws: 32MS/32WS/16MD/16WD/16XD	Score: 3–0 (11–8, 12–10, 11–7)	
14–17 November	Austrian Open: Location: Linz, Austria; Venue: TipsArena Linz; Category: World Tour Platinum; Prize: $260,000; Draws: 32MS/32WS/16MD/16WD/16XD	(Japan) Miyuu Kihara (Japan) Miyu Nagasaki	(Chinese Taipei) Chen Szu-yu (Chinese Taipei) Cheng Hsien-tzu
14–17 November	Austrian Open: Location: Linz, Austria; Venue: TipsArena Linz; Category: World Tour Platinum; Prize: $260,000; Draws: 32MS/32WS/16MD/16WD/16XD	Score: 3–2 (11–8, 11–7, 7–11, 9–11, 11–4)	
14–17 November	Austrian Open: Location: Linz, Austria; Venue: TipsArena Linz; Category: World Tour Platinum; Prize: $260,000; Draws: 32MS/32WS/16MD/16WD/16XD	(Japan) Tomokazu Harimoto (Japan) Hina Hayata	(China) Lin Gaoyuan (China) Zhu Yuling
14–17 November	Austrian Open: Location: Linz, Austria; Venue: TipsArena Linz; Category: World Tour Platinum; Prize: $260,000; Draws: 32MS/32WS/16MD/16WD/16XD	Score: 3–1 (11–5, 4–11, 11–5, 11–6)	
12–15 December	Grand Finals: Location: Zhengzhou, China; Venue: Zhengzhou Olympic Sports Center; Category: Grand Finals; Prize: $1,001,000; Draws: 16MS/16WS/8MD/8WD/8XD	(China) Fan Zhendong	(China) Ma Long
12–15 December	Grand Finals: Location: Zhengzhou, China; Venue: Zhengzhou Olympic Sports Center; Category: Grand Finals; Prize: $1,001,000; Draws: 16MS/16WS/8MD/8WD/8XD	Score: 4–1 (11–6, 12–10, 11–6, 6–11, 11–8)	
12–15 December	Grand Finals: Location: Zhengzhou, China; Venue: Zhengzhou Olympic Sports Center; Category: Grand Finals; Prize: $1,001,000; Draws: 16MS/16WS/8MD/8WD/8XD	(China) Chen Meng	(China) Wang Manyu
12–15 December	Grand Finals: Location: Zhengzhou, China; Venue: Zhengzhou Olympic Sports Center; Category: Grand Finals; Prize: $1,001,000; Draws: 16MS/16WS/8MD/8WD/8XD	Score: 4–1 (11–9, 11–6, 11–6, 9–11, 11–6)	
12–15 December	Grand Finals: Location: Zhengzhou, China; Venue: Zhengzhou Olympic Sports Center; Category: Grand Finals; Prize: $1,001,000; Draws: 16MS/16WS/8MD/8WD/8XD	(China) Fan Zhendong (China) Xu Xin	(Chinese Taipei) Liao Cheng-ting (Chinese Taipei) Lin Yun-ju
12–15 December	Grand Finals: Location: Zhengzhou, China; Venue: Zhengzhou Olympic Sports Center; Category: Grand Finals; Prize: $1,001,000; Draws: 16MS/16WS/8MD/8WD/8XD	Score: 3–1 (11–7, 11–6, 11–13, 11–3)	
12–15 December	Grand Finals: Location: Zhengzhou, China; Venue: Zhengzhou Olympic Sports Center; Category: Grand Finals; Prize: $1,001,000; Draws: 16MS/16WS/8MD/8WD/8XD	(Japan) Miyuu Kihara (Japan) Miyu Nagasaki	(South Korea) Jeon Ji-hee (South Korea) Yang Ha-eun
12–15 December	Grand Finals: Location: Zhengzhou, China; Venue: Zhengzhou Olympic Sports Center; Category: Grand Finals; Prize: $1,001,000; Draws: 16MS/16WS/8MD/8WD/8XD	Score: 3–0 (12–10, 11–6, 11–6)	
12–15 December	Grand Finals: Location: Zhengzhou, China; Venue: Zhengzhou Olympic Sports Center; Category: Grand Finals; Prize: $1,001,000; Draws: 16MS/16WS/8MD/8WD/8XD	(China) Xu Xin (China) Liu Shiwen	(Japan) Jun Mizutani (Japan) Mima Ito
12–15 December	Grand Finals: Location: Zhengzhou, China; Venue: Zhengzhou Olympic Sports Center; Category: Grand Finals; Prize: $1,001,000; Draws: 16MS/16WS/8MD/8WD/8XD	Score: 3–2 (9–11, 6–11, 11–3, 11–8, 11–9)	

== Grand Finals ==
The 2019 ITTF World Tour Grand Finals will take place in Zhengzhou, China, from 12–15 December 2019.

== See also ==
- 2019 World Table Tennis Championships
- 2019 ITTF Men's World Cup
- 2019 ITTF Women's World Cup
- 2019 ITTF Team World Cup
- 2019 ITTF Challenge Series
