= 2019 China Open (table tennis) =

Tournament details
- Dates: 30 May– 2 June 2019
- Competitors: 32S / 16D
- Total prize money: US$400,000
- Venue: Bao'an Gymnasium
- Location: Shenzhen, China

Champions
- Men's singles: (China) Ma Long
- Women's singles: (China) Chen Meng
- Men's doubles: (Germany) Timo Boll (Germany) Patrick Franziska
- Women's doubles: (China) Gu Yuting (China) Liu Shiwen
- Mixed doubles: (Chinese Taipei) Lin Yun-ju (Chinese Taipei) Cheng I-ching

The 2019 China Open was a table tennis tournament which took place at Bao'an Gymnasium in Shenzhen, China, from 30 May to 2 June 2019 and had a total prize of $400,000.

== Tournament ==
The 2019 China Open was the third tournament of the 2019 ITTF World Tour and also part of the China Open championships, which have been held since 1988.

China's Ma Long became the most successful player in the event's history, winning his record-extending eighth China Open men's singles title.

=== Venue ===
This tournament was held at the Bao'an Gymnasium in Shenzhen, China.

=== Point distribution ===
Below is the point distribution table for each phase of the tournament.

Event	Winner	Finalist	Semi-finalist	Quarter-finalist	Round of 16	Round of 32
Singles	500	300	200	100	50	25
Doubles	300	150	75	38	19	—

=== Prize pool ===
The total prize money is US$400,000.

Event	Winner	Finalist	Semi-finalist	Quarter-finalist	Round of 16	Round of 32
Singles	$44,000	$22,000	$10,600	$5,900	$3,300	$2,050
Doubles	$10,000	$5,000	$2,500	—	—	—

== Men's singles ==
=== Seeds ===
1. (China) Fan Zhendong (quarter-finals)
2. (China) Xu Xin (semi-finals)
3. (China) Lin Gaoyuan (final)
4. (Japan) Tomokazu Harimoto (semi-finals)
5. (Germany) Timo Boll (quarter-finals)
6. (South Korea) Lee Sang-su (first round)
7. (Brazil) Hugo Calderano (second round)
8. (Japan) Koki Niwa (second round)
9. (China) Liang Jingkun (quarter-finals)
10. (South Korea) Jang Woo-jin (first round)
11. (China) Ma Long (champion)
12. (Germany) Dimitrij Ovtcharov (second round)
13. (Japan) Jun Mizutani (second round)
14. (Hong Kong) Wong Chun Ting (quarter-finals)
15. (England) Liam Pitchford (second round)
16. (Sweden) Mattias Falck (first round)

=== Draw ===
==== Finals ====
Semifinals
11	(China) Ma Long	14	16	11	11	11
4	(Japan) Tomokazu Harimoto	16	14	7	8	7
3	(China) Lin Gaoyuan	11	6	5	11	11	11
2	(China) Xu Xin	9	11	11	6	8	6

Final
11	(China) Ma Long	12	11	11	11
3	(China) Lin Gaoyuan	10	6	5	4

==== Top half ====
===== Section 1 =====
First round
1	(China) Fan ZD	11	8	11	11	11
(India) S Gnanasekaran	8	11	6	9	7
(Slovakia) L Pistej	11	1	11	9	11	11
10	(South Korea) Jang W-j	9	11	9	11	4	9
11	(China) Ma L	11	11	5	11	11
(Japan) M Oikawa	6	5	11	5	5
(Japan) K Yoshimura	3	8	6	4
8	(Japan) K Niwa	11	11	11	11

Second round
1	(China) Fan ZD	11	7	11	11	12
(Slovakia) L Pistej	7	11	0	8	10
11	(China) Ma L	11	11	11	11
8	(Japan) K Niwa	4	5	5	2

Quarterfinals
1	(China) Fan ZD	4	11	6	10	11
11	(China) Ma L	11	8	11	12	13

===== Section 2 =====
First round
6	(South Korea) Lee S-s	11	9	6	9	7
(France) S Gauzy	6	11	11	11	11
(Chinese Taipei) Lin Y-j	9	11	7	11	9	12
14	(Hong Kong) Wong C T	11	4	11	8	11	14
15	(England) L Pitchford	11	11	12	12
(China) Zhou QH	7	7	10	10
(South Korea) Cho S-m	3	11	3	8	2
4	(Japan) T Harimoto	11	6	11	11	11

Second round
(France) S Gauzy	4	11	7	6	9
14	(Hong Kong) Wong C T	11	9	11	11	11
15	(England) L Pitchford	8	9	8	8
4	(Japan) T Harimoto	11	11	11	11

Quarterfinals
(Hong Kong) Wong C T	7	5	3	12	10
4	(Japan) T Harimoto	11	11	11	10	12

==== Bottom half ====
===== Section 3 =====
First round
3	(China) Lin GY	11	11	11	8	11
(Japan) M Yoshimura	9	6	3	11	3
(Germany) R Walther	5	12	4	11	8	12	6
12	(Germany) D Ovtcharov	11	10	11	6	11	10	11
9	(China) Liang JK	15	9	11	11	13
(Belarus) V Samsonov	13	11	9	9	11
(South Korea) Hwang M-h	5	10	11	6	8
7	(Brazil) H Calderano	11	12	6	11	11

Second round
3	(China) Lin GY	9	11	9	9	11	12	17
12	(Germany) D Ovtcharov	11	8	11	11	9	10	15
9	(China) Liang JK	8	11	9	11	11	11
7	(Brazil) H Calderano	11	8	11	9	4	6

Quarterfinals
3	(China) Lin GY	11	11	11	8	6	6	11
9	(China) Liang JK	9	9	9	11	11	11	7

===== Section 4 =====
First round
5	(Germany) T Boll	11	8	9	11	12	9	11
(Portugal) J Monteiro	8	11	11	6	10	11	6
(China) Yu ZY	8	11	11	11	9	11	11
16	(Sweden) M Falck	11	9	13	9	11	9	5
13	(Japan) J Mizutani	11	11	11	11
(Portugal) J Geraldo	6	7	9	9
(France) E Lebesson	8	5	11	4
2	(China) Xu X	11	11	13	11

Second round
5	(Germany) T Boll	11	8	11	13	8	12	11
(China) Yu ZY	8	11	9	15	11	10	8
13	(Japan) J Mizutani	4	8	6	7
2	(China) Xu X	11	11	11	11

Quarterfinals
5	(Germany) T Boll	4	7	9	6
2	(China) Xu X	11	11	11	11

== Women's singles ==
=== Seeds ===
1. (China) Ding Ning (quarter-finals)
2. (China) Zhu Yuling (semi-finals)
3. (China) Chen Meng (champion)
4. (China) Wang Manyu (final)
5. (China) Liu Shiwen (quarter-finals)
6. (Japan) Kasumi Ishikawa (second round)
7. (Japan) Mima Ito (semi-finals)
8. (Chinese Taipei) Cheng I-ching (quarter-finals)
9. (Japan) Miu Hirano (second round)
10. (Singapore) Feng Tianwei (second round)
11. (Hong Kong) Doo Hoi Kem (first round)
12. (Japan) Hitomi Sato (first round)
13. (Japan) Saki Shibata (first round)
14. (China) Chen Xingtong (quarter-finals)
15. (North Korea) Kim Song-i (second round)
16. (Romania) Bernadette Szocs (second round)

=== Draw ===
==== Finals ====
Semifinals
7	(Japan) Mima Ito	10	10	11	7	6
4	(China) Wang Manyu	12	12	5	11	11
3	(China) Chen Meng	18	5	11	11	11
2	(China) Zhu Yuling	16	11	8	6	9

Final
4	(China) Wang Manyu	3	11	9	9	7
3	(China) Chen Meng	11	8	11	11	11

==== Top half ====
===== Section 1 =====
First round
1	(China) Ding N	11	11	11	8	16
(Japan) M Kihara	8	3	9	11	14
(North Korea) Cha H-s	11	9	7	9	7
9	(Japan) M Hirano	3	11	11	11	11
10	(Singapore) Feng TW	8	11	11	13	11
(Germany) Shan XN	11	8	8	11	3
(China) Wang YD	10	7	12	11	11	9	7
7	(Japan) M Ito	12	11	10	7	3	11	11

Second round
1	(China) Ding N	11	11	11	11
9	(Japan) M Hirano	9	3	6	7
10	(Singapore) Feng TW	6	8	12	9
7	(Japan) M Ito	11	11	14	11

Quarterfinals
1	(China) Ding N	11	10	16	11	9
7	(Japan) M Ito	7	12	18	13	11

===== Section 2 =====
First round
5	(China) Liu SW	7	11	11	11	11
(China) Gu YT	11	7	5	6	4
(Austria) S Polcanova	11	5	11	9	11	8	11
12	(Japan) H Sato	7	11	9	11	8	11	8
11	(Hong Kong) Doo H K	11	4	7	13	11	8	8
(Chinese Taipei) Chen S-y	5	11	11	11	7	11	11
(Russia) P Mikhailova	9	5	5	11	7
4	(China) Wang MY	11	11	11	8	11

Second round
5	(China) Liu SW	11	11	11	11
(Austria) S Polcanova	8	5	7	5
(Chinese Taipei) Chen S-y	5	14	12	8	5
4	(China) Wang MY	11	12	14	11	11

Quarterfinals
5	(China) Liu SW	6	4	11	4	11
4	(China) Wang MY	11	11	6	11	13

==== Bottom half ====
===== Section 3 =====
First round
3	(China) Chen M	7	11	6	11	6	11	11
(China) Sun YS	11	9	11	6	11	6	3
(Germany) N Mittelham	16	6	15	9	7	11	9
15	(North Korea) Kim S-i	14	11	13	11	11	8	11
14	(China) Chen XT	11	6	11	5	11	11
(Japan) M Kato	7	11	3	11	8	5
(Luxembourg) Ni X L	4	8	2	2
6	(Japan) K Ishikawa	11	11	11	11

Second round
3	(China) Chen M	11	11	11	11
15	(North Korea) Kim S-i	6	8	6	5
14	(China) Chen XT	11	11	11	11
6	(Japan) K Ishikawa	6	5	8	5

Quarterfinals
3	(China) Chen M	11	11	11	11
14	(China) Chen XT	9	5	3	7

===== Section 4 =====
First round
8	(Chinese Taipei) Cheng I-c	11	11	11	11
(Germany) Han Y	9	8	7	5
(Chinese Taipei) Liu Y-h	9	7	6	8
16	(Romania) B Szocs	11	11	11	11
13	(Japan) S Shibata	9	11	7	5	3
(China) Qian TY	11	8	11	11	11
(Japan) M Ando	10	5	11	5	11	7
2	(China) Zhu YL	12	11	6	11	4	11

Second round
8	(Chinese Taipei) Cheng I-c	14	9	11	11	13	11
16	(Romania) B Szocs	12	11	7	3	15	8
(China) Qian TY	8	8	5	6
2	(China) Zhu YL	11	11	11	11

Quarterfinals
8	(Chinese Taipei) Cheng I-c	11	12	7	4	5
2	(China) Zhu YL	7	14	11	11	11

== Men's doubles ==
=== Seeds ===
1. (South Korea) Lee Sang-su / Jeoung Young-sik (semi-finals)
2. (Chinese Taipei) Liao Cheng-ting / Lin Yun-ju (first round)
3. (South Korea) Jang Woo-jin / Lim Jong-hoon (semi-finals)
4. (Romania) Ovidiu Ionescu / (Spain) Alvaro Robles (quarter-finals)
5. (Hong Kong) Wong Chun Ting / Lam Siu Hang (first round)
6. (Hong Kong) Ho Kwan Kit / Ng Pak Nam (first round)
7. (China) Lin Gaoyuan / Liang Jingkun (first round)
8. (Japan) Masataka Morizono / Jin Ueda (quarter-finals)

=== Draw ===
First round
1	(South Korea) Jeoung Y-s (South Korea) Lee S-s	11	11	11
(Portugal) T Apolonia (Portugal) J Monteiro	8	3	2
(Austria) R Gardos (Austria) D Habesohn	11	6	11	9	7
8	(Japan) M Morizono (Japan) J Ueda	9	11	5	11	11
6	(Hong Kong) Ho K K (Hong Kong) Ng P N
(China) Ma L (China) Wang CQ	w/o
(Sweden) A Kallberg (Sweden) T Moregard	11	7	9	7
4	(Romania) O Ionescu (Spain) A Robles	5	11	11	11
3	(South Korea) Jang W-j (South Korea) Lim J-h	5	11	9	11	11
(France) T Flore (France) E Lebesson	11	7	11	3	6
(Sweden) K Karlsson (Sweden) J Persson	12	11	11	11
7	(China) Liang JK (China) Lin GY	10	7	13	5
5	(Hong Kong) Lam S H (Hong Kong) Wong C T	9	13	8	11	8
(Germany) D Ovtcharov (Germany) R Walther	11	11	11	2	11
(Germany) T Boll (Germany) P Franziska	10	8	11	11	11
2	(Chinese Taipei) Liao C-t (Chinese Taipei) Lin Y-j	12	11	3	1	6

Quarterfinals
1	(South Korea) Jeoung Y-s (South Korea) Lee S-s	12	11	11	11
8	(Japan) M Morizono (Japan) J Ueda	11	9	9	8
(China) Ma L (China) Wang CQ	9	11	11	11
4	(Romania) O Ionescu (Spain) A Robles	11	3	7	2
3	(South Korea) Jang W-j (South Korea) Lim J-h	6	11	12	14
(Sweden) K Karlsson (Sweden) J Persson	11	5	10	12
(Germany) D Ovtcharov (Germany) R Walther	8	14	5
(Germany) T Boll (Germany) P Franziska	11	16	11

Semifinals
1	(South Korea) Jeoung Y-s (South Korea) Lee S-s	7	11	7	10
(China) Ma L (China) Wang CQ	11	9	11	12
3	(South Korea) Jang W-j (South Korea) Lim J-h	6	9	11	11	9
(Germany) T Boll (Germany) P Franziska	11	11	7	2	11

Final
(China) Ma L (China) Wang CQ	8	7	5
(Germany) T Boll (Germany) P Franziska	11	11	11

== Women's doubles ==
=== Seeds ===
1. (China) Wang Manyu / Zhu Yuling (final)
2. (Czech Republic) Hana Matelova / (Slovakia) Barbora Balazova (first round)
3. (Hong Kong) Ng Wing Nam / Doo Hoi Kem (first round)
4. (Hong Kong) Soo Wai Yam / Lee Ho Ching (quarter-finals)
5. (North Korea) Cha Hyo-sim / Kim Nam-hae (semi-finals)
6. (Singapore) Lin Ye / Zeng Jian (quarter-finals)
7. (Chinese Taipei) Cheng Hsien-tzu / Chen Szu-yu (first round)
8. (Romania) Bernadette Szocs / (Spain) Galia Dvorak (first round)

=== Draw ===
First round
1	(China) Wang MY (China) ZHU YL	13	11	11
(Austria) K Mischek (Austria) A Solja	11	6	6
(Austria) Y Hamamoto (Austria) S Polcanova	8	13	9	5
6	(Singapore) Lin Y (Singapore) Zeng J	11	11	11	11
5	(North Korea) Cho H-s (North Korea) Kim N-h	11	11	12
(China) Qia TY (China) Sun MY	9	8	10
(Russia) Y Noskova (Russia) M Tailakova	7	11	5	8
4	(Hong Kong) Lee H C (Hong Kong) Soo W Y	11	9	11	11
3	(Hong Kong) Doo H K (Hong Kong) Ng W N	12	7	9	11	15
(Japan) H Nakamori (Japan) S Odo	10	11	11	9	17
(Spain) Xiao M (Canada) Zhang M	11	11	11
8	(Spain) G Dvorak (Romania) B Szocs	3	9	6
7	(Chinese Taipei) Chen S-y (Chinese Taipei) Cheng H-t	10	7	8
(China) Gu YT (China) Liu SW	12	11	11
(Japan) M Kihara (Japan) M Nagasaki	12	11	12
2	(Slovakia) B Balazova (Czech Republic) H Matelova	10	8	10

Quarterfinals
1	(China) Wang MY (China) ZHU YL	11	12	11
6	(Singapore) Lin Y (Singapore) Zeng J	4	10	6
5	(North Korea) Cho H-s (North Korea) Kim N-h	11	11	11
4	(Hong Kong) Lee H C (Hong Kong) Soo W Y	3	4	5
(Japan) H Nakamori (Japan) S Odo	11	11	10	7	11
(Spain) Xiao M (Canada) Zhang M	2	7	12	11	7
(China) Gu YT (China) Liu SW	11	12	11
(Japan) M Kihara (Japan) M Nagasaki	7	10	7

Semifinals
1	(China) Wang MY (China) ZHU YL	11	11	11
5	(North Korea) Cho H-s (North Korea) Kim N-h	9	5	6
(Japan) H Nakamori (Japan) S Odo	9	11	11	6	7
(China) Gu YT (China) Liu SW	11	9	9	11	11

Final
1	(China) Wang MY (China) ZHU YL	7	10	9
(China) Gu YT (China) Liu SW	11	12	11

== Mixed doubles ==
=== Seeds ===
1. (Hong Kong) Wong Chun Ting / Doo Hoi Kem (final)
2. (Slovakia) Barbora Balazova / Lubomir Pistej (first round)
3. (Hong Kong) Ho Kwan Kit / Lee Ho Ching (first round)
4. (Chinese Taipei) Cheng I-ching / Lin Yun-ju (Champion)
5. (China) Chen Meng / Xu Xin (quarter-fnals)
6. (Austria) Stefan Fegerl / Sofia Polcanova (quarter-fnals)
7. (Japan) Tomokazu Harimoto / Kasumi Ishikawa (quarter-fnals)
8. (France) Tristan Flore / Laura Gasnier (first round)

=== Draw ===
First round
1	(Hong Kong) Wong C T (Hong Kong) Doo H K	11	11	11
(Netherlands) L Tromer (Netherlands) B Eerland	9	5	7
(Spain) J Cantero (Spain) Xiao M	3	2	14	13	7
7	(Japan) T Harimoto (Japan) K Ishikawa	11	11	12	11	11
8	(France) T Flore (France) L Gasnier	11	6	11	9	9
(Romania) O Ionescu (Romania) B Szocs	3	11	4	11	11
(North Korea) Ham Y-s (North Korea) Cha H-s	10	11	11	8	11
3	(Hong Kong) Ho K K (Hong Kong) Lee H C	12	7	9	11	1
4	(Chinese Taipei) Lin Y J (Chinese Taipei) Cheng I-c	11	11	10	11
(North Korea) An J-s (North Korea) Kim N-h	9	7	12	4
(France) E Lebesson (France) J N Yuan	11	4	10	3
5	(China) Xu X (China) Chen M	7	11	12	11
6	(Austria) S Fegerl (Austria) S Polcanova	11	11	11
(Turkey) I Gunduz (Turkey) S Altinkaya	6	7	6
(Japan) K Niwa (Japan) M Ito	11	7	13	13
2	(Slovakia) L Pistej (Slovakia) B Balazova	6	11	11	11

Quarterfinals
1	(Hong Kong) Wong C T (Hong Kong) Doo H K	11	3	11	10	12
7	(Japan) T Harimoto (Japan) K Ishikawa	8	11	8	12	10
(Romania) O Ionescu (Romania) B Szocs	9	6	12	11	4
(North Korea) Ham Y-s (North Korea) Cha H-s	11	11	10	7	11
4	(Chinese Taipei) Lin Y J (Chinese Taipei) Cheng I-c	11	11	11
5	(China) Xu X (China) Chen M	6	9	9
6	(Austria) S Fegerl (Austria) S Polcanova	9	9	8
(Japan) K Niwa (Japan) M Ito	11	11	11

Semifinals
1	(Hong Kong) Wong C T (Hong Kong) Doo H K	11	7	4	12	11
(North Korea) Ham Y-s (North Korea) Cha H-s	7	11	11	10	4
4	(Chinese Taipei) Lin Y J (Chinese Taipei) Cheng I-c	13	6	11	4	11
(Japan) K Niwa (Japan) M Ito	11	11	8	11	8

Final
1	(Hong Kong) Wong C T (Hong Kong) Doo H K	12	6	1	5
4	(Chinese Taipei) Lin Y J (Chinese Taipei) Cheng I-c	10	11	11	11
