= 2019 China Open =

2019 China Open may refer to:

- 2019 China Open (badminton), the Victor China Open 2019 in Xincheng
- 2019 China Open (curling), in Tianjin
- 2019 China Open (snooker), in Beijing
- 2019 China Open (table tennis), in Bao'an
- 2019 China Open (tennis), an ATP Tour 500 event in Beijing
