= Liu Fei (table tennis) =

Chinese table tennis player

Personal information
- Nationality: Chinese
- Born: 18 January 1994 (age 31)

Sport
- Sport: Table tennis

Liu Fei (born 18 January 1994) is a Chinese table tennis player. Her highest career ITTF ranking was 23.
