= Lin Yun-ju =

Taiwanese table tennis player (born 2001)

Lin Yun-Ju
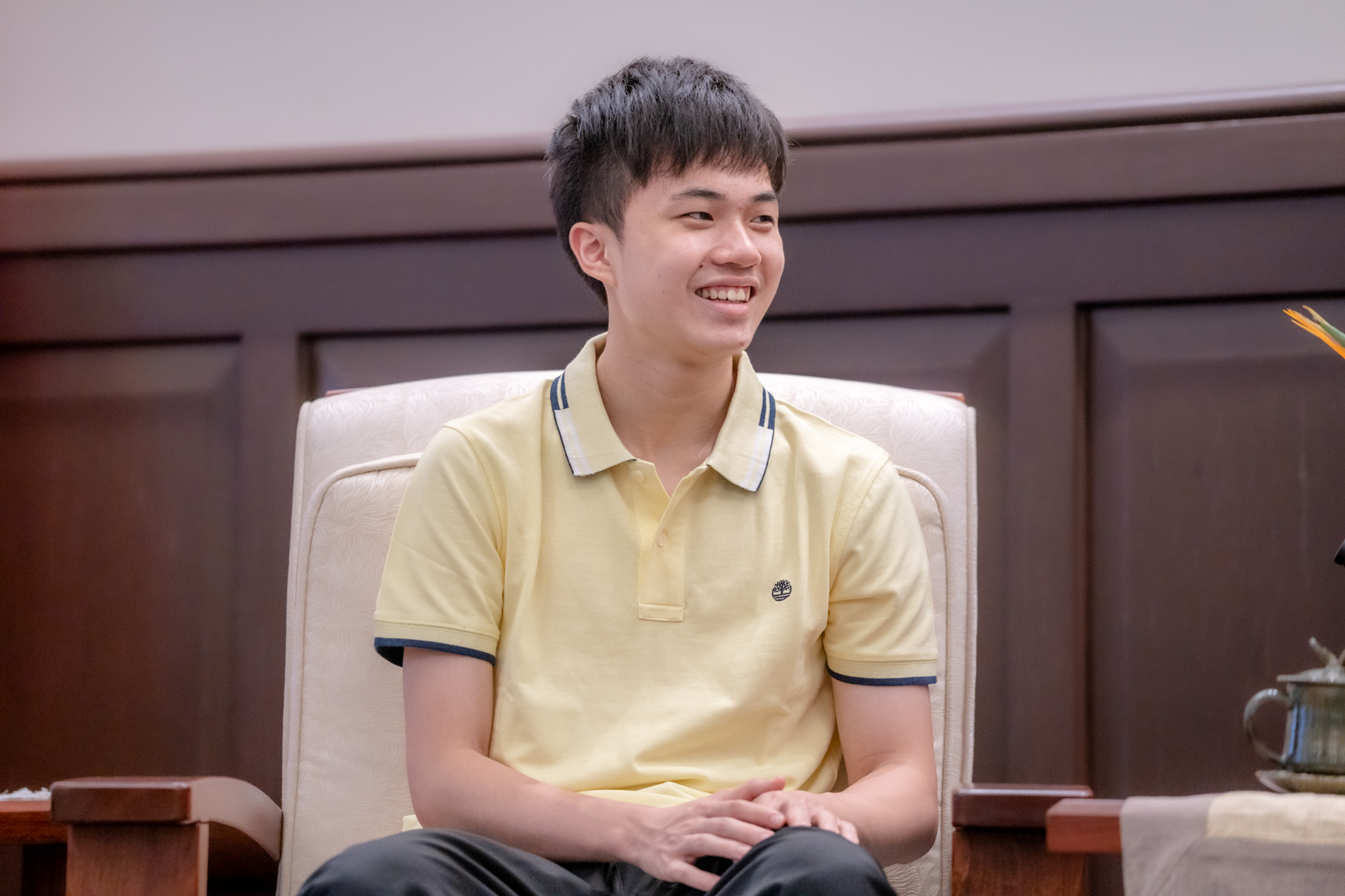
- Lin in 2019

Personal information
- Native name: 林昀儒
- Nicknames: The Silent Assassin , Little Lin mate (小林同學）
- Born: 17 August 2001 (age 25) Yuanshan, Taiwan
- Height: 1.74 m (5 ft 9 in)

Sport
- Sport: Table tennis
- Club: Kinoshita Meister Tokyo (T.League)
- Playing style: Left-handed shakehand grip
- Equipment: Butterfly Viscaria Super ALC with Zyre 03 on forehand and Dignics 05 on backhand
- Highest ranking: 5 (3 August 2021)
- Current ranking: 6 (5 October 2026)
Medal record
Men's table tennis
Representing Chinese Taipei
Olympic Games
Bronze medal – third place	2020 Tokyo	Mixed doubles
World Championships
Silver medal – second place	2025 Doha	Doubles
Bronze medal – third place	2021 Houston	Mixed doubles
Bronze medal – third place	2024 Busan	Team
Bronze medal – third place	2026 London	Team
World Cup
Bronze medal – third place	2019 Tokyo	Team
Bronze medal – third place	2019 Chengdu	Singles
Bronze medal – third place	2026 Macao	Singles
Asian Games
Bronze medal – third place	2018 Jakarta	Team
Bronze medal – third place	2022 Hangzhou	Doubles
Bronze medal – third place	2022 Hangzhou	Team
Bronze medal – third place	2026 Aichi-Nagoya	Singles
Bronze medal – third place	2026 Aichi-Nagoya	Team
Asian Championships
Silver medal – second place	2023 Pyeongchang	Team
Silver medal – second place	2024 Astana	Team
Bronze medal – third place	2023 Pyeongchang	Singles
Bronze medal – third place	2023 Pyeongchang	Mixed doubles
Youth Olympic Games
Bronze medal – third place	2018 Buenos Aires	Mixed team

Lin Yun-Ju (Chinese: 林昀儒; pinyin: Lín Yún rú born 17 August 2001) is a Taiwanese table tennis player. He is a left-handed player who plays with the shakehand grip.

== Career ==
Lin began playing table tennis in third grade. He started competing on the International Table Tennis Federation (ITTF) senior circuit in 2016. At age 14, he officially became a member of the national team at the 2016 World Team Championships, making him the youngest Taiwanese player to achieve this.

Lin made his debut in the men's singles event at the 2017 World Championships, where he lost in a seven-game battle in the first round to Bastian Steger. He remained a member of the national team and competed alongside Chuang Chih-yuan and Chen Chien-an at the 2018 Asian Games, where they won a bronze medal in the men's team event. That same year, he also took part in the 2018 Youth Olympics, where he and his teammate Su Pei-ling secured a bronze medal in the mixed team event.

=== 2019–2021 ===
In March 2019, Lin won the men's singles title at the ITTF Challenge Plus Oman Open, defeating Mattias Falck in the final. He also secured titles in the men's doubles with Liao Cheng-ting and in the mixed doubles with Cheng I-ching, completing a remarkable triple crown at the event. In the May world rankings, he surpassed Chuang Chih-yuan to become the highest-ranked Taiwanese player in men's singles. Lin reached the final of the Japan Open, where he lost to Xu Xin. He then went on to win two consecutive tournaments: first, the T2 Diamond Malaysia in July, followed by his first ITTF World Tour title at the Czech Open in August, at the age of only 18. In these tournaments, he defeated several top players, including Ma Long, Fan Zhendong, Dimitrij Ovtcharov, and Timo Boll.

Lin broke into the world's top ten in September 2019. He later reached another T2 Diamond final in Singapore, where he was once again defeated by Xu Xin. He went on to beat Ma Long to win the bronze medal at the Men's World Cup, becoming the first Taiwanese player ever to medal in the event.

After the outbreak of the COVID-19 pandemic, Lin trained in China alongside members of the Chinese national team and other selected foreigners from late 2020 until early 2021. His first international event during this period was the WTT Contender at World Table Tennis' inaugural event, WTT Doha, where he reached the finals after defeating Quadri Aruna in the quarterfinals and Simon Gauzy in the semifinals, before being upset by Dimitrij Ovtcharov in the final. In the WTT Star Contender event, Lin suffered a quarterfinal upset against Ruwen Filus. However, Lin left Doha having secured the fourth seed for the men's singles event at the 2020 Tokyo Olympics. In April, the ITTF amended the Olympic seeding system, causing Lin to drop to the fifth seed, below Hugo Calderano.

At the Tokyo Olympics, Lin first competed in the mixed doubles event with Cheng I-ching. As the third seed, the pair lost in the semifinals to Japan's Jun Mizutani and Mima Ito but went on to claim the bronze medal by defeating Emmanuel Lebesson and Jia Nan Yuan. In the men's singles event, Lin lost a seven-game semifinal to Fan Zhendong and ultimately placed fourth after falling to Dimitrij Ovtcharov in the bronze-medal match, where he missed four match points. In the final table tennis event, the men's team competition, Lin defeated Ovtcharov, but Chinese Taipei was eliminated by Germany 3–2 in the quarterfinals.

At the World Championships following the Olympics, Lin was eliminated in the third round of the men's singles. However, he and Cheng I-ching advanced to the semifinals in the mixed doubles event and claimed Lin's first World Championships medal after losing to the Chinese duo Wang Chuqin and Sun Yingsha.

=== 2022–2026 ===
In 2022, Lin claimed the men's singles title at the WTT Contender Zagreb, defeating China's Xiang Peng in the final. He also reached the final at the WTT Contender Almaty, where he lost to Germany's Ruwen Filus in a tightly contested seven-game match. In 2023, Lin once again defeating Xiang Peng to win the men's singles title at WTT Contender Almaty. That year, he also secured three medals at the 2023 Asian Championships and added two more medals at the Asian Games, further proving his strength on the international stage. Lin achieved a major milestone by winning his first WTT Champions title in Frankfurt, with an impressive series of victories over Patrick Franziska, Benedikt Duda, Tomokazu Harimoto, Wang Chuqin, and Ma Long.

At the 2024 World Team Championships, Lin competed as the highest-ranked player on the Chinese Taipei men's team. The team defeated Sweden to qualify for the 2024 Summer Olympics. In the quarterfinals, they surprised many by sweeping Germany 3–0, but later lost to France in the semifinals. With this result, the team matched its best finish in the event, first reached in 2014. Lin went on to compete in three events at the 2024 Summer Olympics, but despite high hopes, he was knocked out in the quarterfinals of all three. In late 2024, he helped the national team achieve a runner-up finish in the men's team event at the Asian Championships.

He secured a silver medal in men's doubles alongside Kao Cheng-jui at the 2025 World Championships in Doha. However, Lin did not win another singles title throughout 2024 and 2025. In January 2026, Lin ended a 798-day singles title drought by defeating South Korea's Jang Woo-jin in straight games to win the WTT Champions Doha, a victory that re-established his position as one of the premier competitors in the sport. Just one month later, at the Singapore Smash, he secured a runner-up finish after having an incredible run.

== Personal life ==
Lin was born in Yuanshan, Yilan County, Taiwan. He graduated from Taipei Municipal Nei-Hu Vocational High School and is currently studying at Fu Jen Catholic University. Venturing into sports ownership, Lin became a co-owner of the Princeton Revolution in the U.S.-based Major League Table Tennis in November 2024.

== Achievements ==
=== Major tournaments ===
Best results at the Olympic Games, World Championships, and World Cup
Tournaments	Events			
Tournaments	Singles	Men's doubles	Mixed doubles	Team
Olympic Games	4th	—	3rd	Quarterfinals
World Championships	Quarterfinals	2nd	Semifinals	Semifinals
World Cup	3rd	—	—	Semifinals

=== Singles titles ===
Year	Tournament	Final opponent	Score	Ref
2019	ITTF Challenge Plus, Oman Open	(Sweden) Mattias Falck	4–2	
2019	T2 Diamond Malaysia	(China) Fan Zhendong	4–1	
2019	ITTF World Tour, Czech Open	(Germany) Dimitrij Ovtcharov	4–1	
2022	WTT Contender Zagreb	(China) Xiang Peng	4–0	
2023	WTT Contender Almaty	(China) Xiang Peng	4–1	
2023	WTT Champions Frankfurt	(China) Ma Long	4–1	
2026	WTT Champions Doha	(South Korea) Jang Woo-jin	4–0	
