= Wu Yang =

Chinese table tennis player (born 1992)

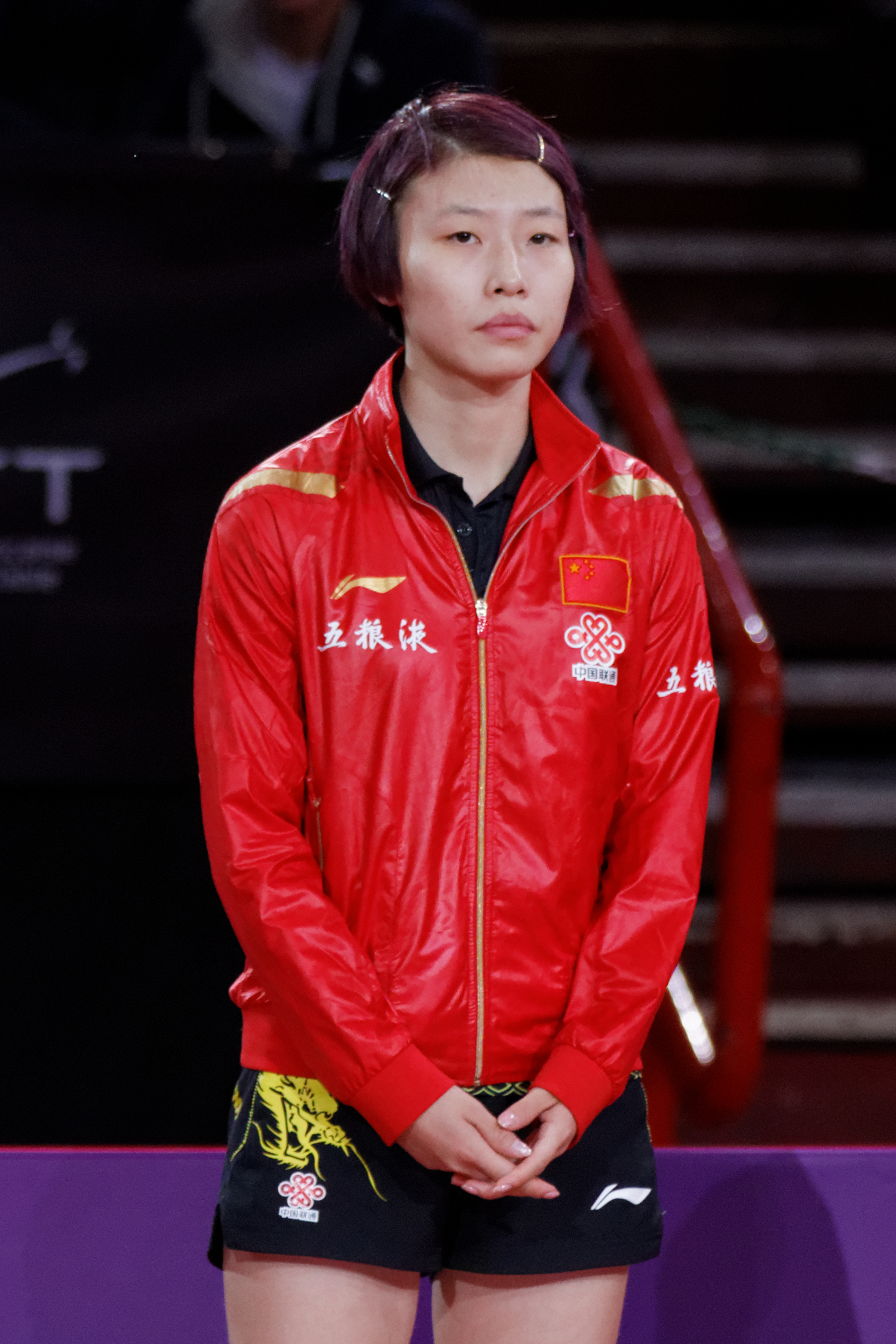
- 2013 World Table Tennis Championships

Personal information
- Full name: WU Yang
- Nationality: China
- Born: 5 January 1992 (age 34)
- Height: 1.72 m (5 ft 7 1/2 in)
- Weight: 57 kg (126 lb; 9.0 st)

Sport
- Sport: Table tennis
- Highest ranking: 4 (January 2014)
- Current ranking: 12 (August 2016)
Medal record
Women's table tennis
Representing China
Asian Games
Gold medal – first place	2014 Incheon	Team
Silver medal – second place	2014 Incheon	Doubles
Asian Championships
Gold medal – first place	2009 Lucknow	Team

Wu Yang (simplified Chinese: 武杨; traditional Chinese: 武楊; pinyin: Wǔ Yáng; born January 5, 1992) is a Chinese table tennis player. She won the gold medal in the team events in the Asian Table Tennis Championships in 2009. She won the singles title at the 2009 World Junior Table Tennis Championships. She is known for her unorthodox but consistent chopping style, and can also be a strong counter-attacker.
