= Tristan Flore =

French table tennis player

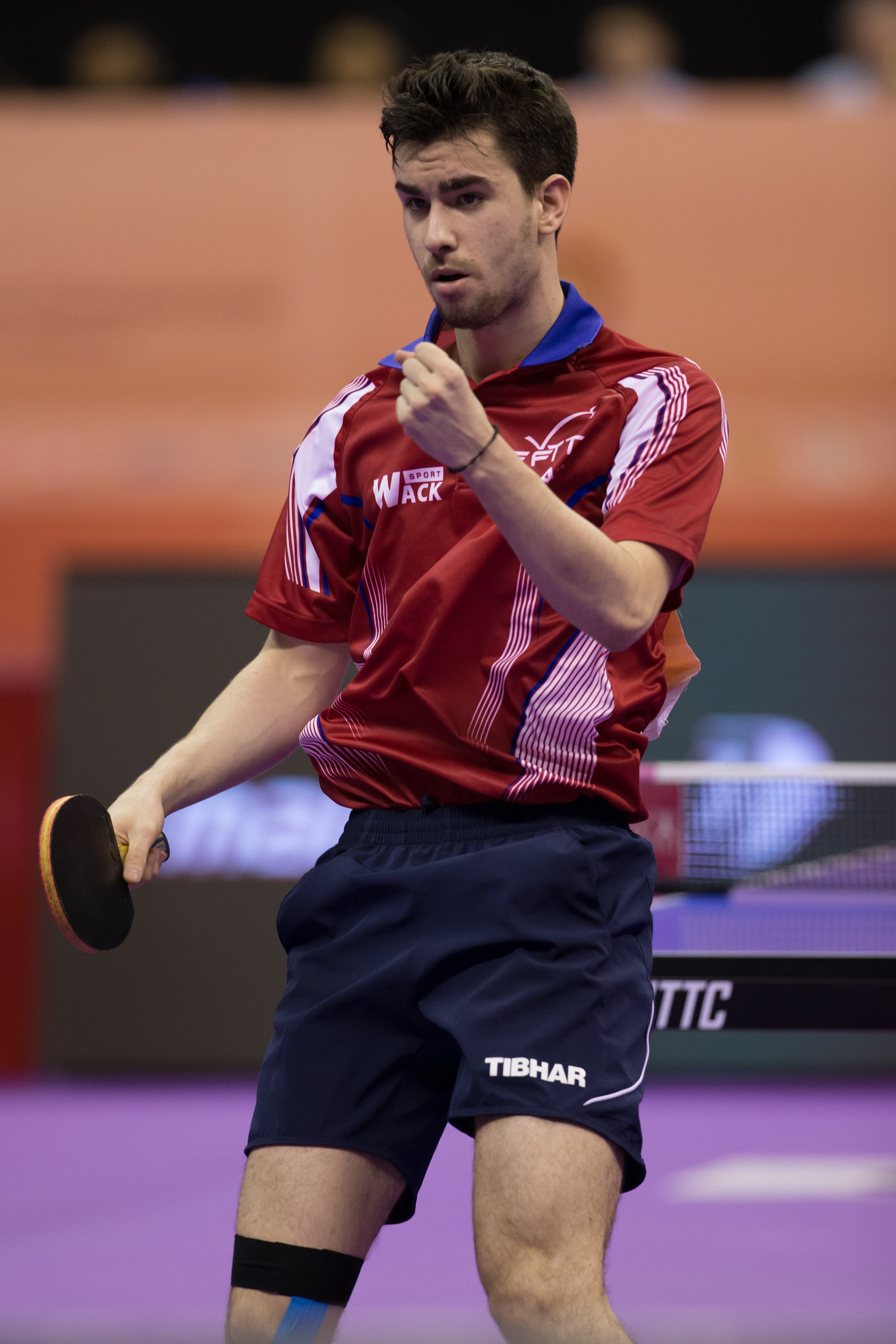
- Flore in 2016

Personal information
- Born: 2 January 1995 (age 31) Montélimar, France
- Height: 1.78 m (5 ft 10 in)
- Weight: 65 kg (143 lb)

Sport
- Sport: Table tennis

Tristan Flore (born 2 January 1995 in Montélimar) is a French table tennis player. He competed at the 2016 Summer Olympics as part of the French team in the men's team event.
