= Ádám Szudi =

Hungarian table tennis player

Personal information
- Nationality: Hungary
- Born: 29 January 1996 (age 29) Szolnok, Hungary

Sport
- Sport: Table tennis

Ádám Szudi (born 29 January 1996) is a Hungarian table tennis player. He competed in the 2020 Summer Olympics.
