= Wong Chun-ting =

Hong Kong table tennis player

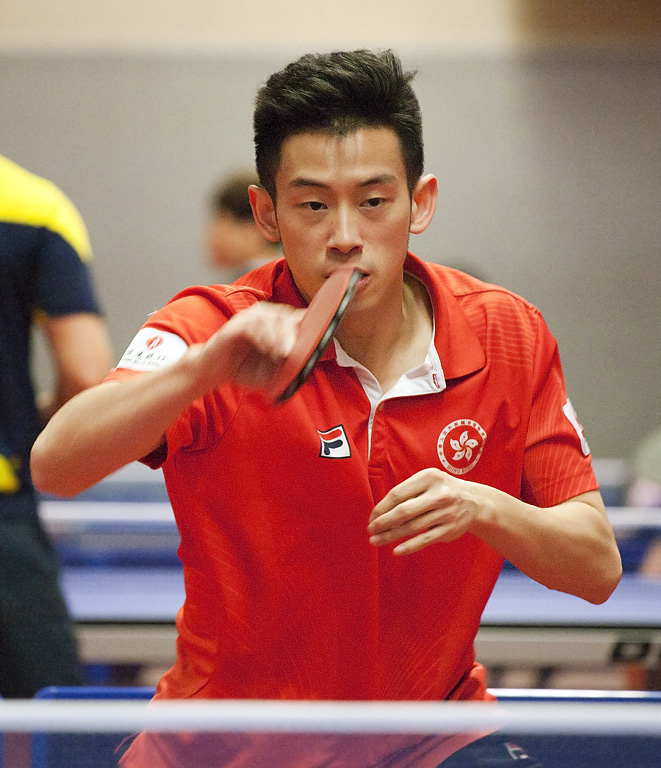
- Wong at the 2017 German Open

Personal information
- Native name: 黃鎮廷
- Born: 7 September 1991 (age 35) British Hong Kong
- Height: 1.70 m (5 ft 7 in)
- Weight: 70 kg (154 lb)

Sport
- Sport: Table tennis
- Playing style: Right-handed, penhold grip
- Highest ranking: 6 (February 2017)
- Current ranking: 41 (2 November 2026)
Medal record
Men's table tennis
Representing Hong Kong
World Championships
Bronze medal – third place	2015 Suzhou	Mixed doubles
Bronze medal – third place	2017 Düsseldorf	Mixed doubles
Bronze medal – third place	2023 Durban	Mixed doubles
Bronze medal – third place	2025 Doha	Mixed doubles
World Cup
Bronze medal – third place	2016 Saarbrücken	Singles
Bronze medal – third place	2024 Chengdu	Mixed team
Asian Games
Bronze medal – third place	2022 Hangzhou	Singles
Asian Championships
Silver medal – second place	2025 Bhubaneswar	Team
Bronze medal – third place	2015 Pattaya	Singles
Bronze medal – third place	2017 Wuxi	Doubles
Bronze medal – third place	2019 Yogyakarta	Mixed Doubles
Bronze medal – third place	2026 Tashkent	Doubles
Asian Cup
Bronze medal – third place	2016 Dubai	Singles

Wong Chun-ting (Chinese: 黃鎮廷; born 7 September 1991) is a Hong Kong table tennis player. He won his first doubles title on the ITTF World Tour in 2012 and won another three doubles titles in 2014. In 2015, he won a bronze medal in mixed doubles event with Doo Hoi Kem at the World Championships. In 2016, he won a bronze medal in the singles event at the Men's World Cup. Since February 2017, his highest rank was number 6 in the world.

Wong started playing table tennis aged six against his brother. He joined a club at age nine.

== About ==
Wong Chun-ting grew up in Sha Kok Estate, Sha Tin in his early years. He attended the school of Po Leung Kuk Chee Jing Yin Primary School, Lok Sin Tong Young Ko Hsiao Lin Secondary School, and Lam Tai Fai College.

In December 2017, Wong Chun-ting said in an interview that he was frankly ashamed of the world calling him "Champion". For him, the title of "Champion" requires an absolute in addition to rankings and medals. Leadership and influence, currently there is no such ability, hope to have in the future, this is also the goal he set for himself.

== Competition results ==
Country	Tournament	Year	Venue	Singles	Doubles	Mixed Doubles	Team
HKG	World Table Tennis Championships	2022	Chengdu				Quarterfinals
HKG	World Table Tennis Championships	2021	Houston	Round of 16	Quarterfinals	Round of 16	
HKG	Summer Olympic Games	2020	Tokyo	Round of 32		Quarterfinals	Round of 16
HKG	World Table Tennis Championships	2019	Budapest	Round of 128	Quarterfinals	Round of 32	
HKG	World Table Tennis Championships	2018	Halmstad				Round of 16
HKG	World Table Tennis Championships	2017	Düsseldorf	Quarterfinals	Quarterfinals	Semi-final	
HKG	Table Tennis World Cup	2016	Saarbrücken	Bronze			
HKG	BWF World Tour China Open	2016	Chengdu	Semi-final	Semi-final	Semi-final	
HKG	BWF World Tour Korea Open	2016	Incheon	Quarterfinals	Quarterfinals		
HKG	Summer Olympic Games	2016	Rio de Janeiro	Round of 16			Round of 16
HKG	BWF World Tour Korea Open	2016	Incheon	Quarterfinals	Quarterfinals		
HKG	BWF World Tour Japan Open	2016	Tokyo	Quarterfinals	Round of 16		
HKG	BWF World Tour Slovenia open	2016	Otočec	Quarterfinals	Silver		
HKG	BWF World Tour Croatia Open	2016	Zagreb	Round of 16	Round of 16		
HKG	Asian Cup Table Tennis Tournament	2016	Dubai	Bronze			
HKG	BWF World Tour Qatar Open	2016	Doha	Quarterfinals	Round of 16		
HKG	BWF World Tour Kuwait Open	2016	Kuwait City	Round of 16	Quarterfinals		
HKG	World Table Tennis Championships	2016	Kuala Lumpur				Quarterfinals
HKG	BWF World Tour German Open	2016	Berlin	Round of 16			
HKG	BWF World Tour World Tour Finals	2015	Lisbon	Round of 16	Quarterfinals		
HKG	BWF World Tour Polish Open	2015	Warsaw	Quarterfinals	Quarterfinals		
HKG	Asian Table Tennis Championships	2015	Pattaya	Semi-final	Round of 16	Quarterfinals	
HKG	BWF World Tour Austrian Open	2015	Wels	Round of 16	Semi-final		
HKG	BWF World Tour Czech Open	2015	Olomouc	Gold	Semi-final		
HKG	BWF World Tour Spanish Open	2015	Almeria	Silver	Round of 16		
HKG	World Tour German Open	2015	Bremen	Round of 16	Round of 16		
HKG	World Table Tennis Championships	2015	Suzhou	Round of 16	Round of 16	Semi-final	
HKG	World Tour Qatar Open	2015	Doha	Qualification	Semi-final		
HKG	World Tour Kuwait Open	2015	Kuwait City	Round of 16	Semi-final		
HKG	World Tour Hungarian Open	2015	Budapest	Round of 32	Round of 16		
HKG	World Tour Finals	2014	Bangkok	Round of 16	Semi-final		
HKG	World Tour Swedish Open	2014	Stockholm	Round of 64	Semi-final		
HKG	World Tour Russian Open	2014	Yekaterinburg	Round of 32	Champion		
HKG	World Tour Japan Open	2014	Yokohama	Round of 16	Semi-final		
HKG	World Tour China Open	2014	Chengdu		Semi-final		
HKG	World Tour Australian Open	2014	Sydney	Semi-final	Champion		
HKG	World Table Tennis Championships	2014	Tokyo				Seventeenth
HKG	World Tour Spanish Open	2014	Almeria	Semi-final	Champion		
HKG	World Tour German Open	2014	Magdeburg	Round of 32	Semi-final		
HKG	World Tour Qatar Open	2014	Doha	Round of 32	Round of 16		
HKG	World Tour Kuwait Open	2014	Kuwait City	Semi-final			
HKG	World Tour German Open	2013	Berlin	Round of 32			
HKG	World Tour Polish Open	2013	Spala	Round of 64			
HKG	World Tour Suzhou Open	2013	Suzhou		Semi-final		
HKG	World Tour Japan Open	2013	Yokohama	Round of 16			
HKG	World Table Tennis Championships	2013	Paris	Qualification	Round of 32		
HKG	World Tour Korea Open	2013	Incheon	Round of 64	Round of 16		
HKG	World Tour Qatar Open	2013	Doha		Round of 16		
HKG	World Tour Kuwait Open	2013	Kuwait City	Round of 64			
HKG	World Tour Spanish Open	2013	Almeria	Round of 16			
HKG	World Tour Polish Open	2012	Poznań		Semi-final		
HKG	World Tour German Open	2012	Bremen	Round of 64	Champion		
HKG	World Tour Suzhou Open	2012	Suzhou		Round of 16		
HKG	World Tour Japan Open	2012	Kobe	Round of 32	Round of 16		
HKG	World Tour China Open	2012	Shanghai	Round of 64	Round of 16		
HKG	World Tour Korea Open	2012	Incheon		Round of 16		
HKG	World Tour Spanish Open	2012	Almeria	Round of 64			
HKG	World Tour Slovenia Open	2012	Velenje	Round of 64			
HKG	World Tour Hungarian Open	2012	Budapest		Semi-final		
HKG	World Tour Suzhou Open	2011	Suzhou	Round of 64			
HKG	World Tour China Open	2011	Shenzhen	Round of 32			
HKG	World Tour Slovenia Open	2011	Velenje	Round of 64			
HKG	World Tour Japan Open	2010	Kobe	Round of 64			
HKG	World Youth Tour Hong Kong Open	2009	Hong Kong	Round of 16	Silver		
HKG	World Youth Tour Hong Kong Open	2009	Chengdu	Round of 16	Round of 16		
HKG	World Youth Tour Taiyuan Open	2008	Taiyuan	Round of 16			
