= 2021 Asian Table Tennis Championships – Men's singles =

Table tennis competition

Men's singles at the 2021 Asian Table Tennis Championships
- Venue: Lusail Sports Arena
- Date: October 2, 2021 – October 5, 2021
- Competitors: 114 from 30 nations

The men's singles at the 2021 Asian Table Tennis Championships in Doha was held at Lusail Sports Arena from 2 to 5 October 2021.

== System of play ==
All individual events shall be played in a knock-out system. Matches in Singles events and Doubles events shall be played in best of five (5) games in all stages of the competition.

== Schedule ==
All times are Arabia Standard Time (UTC+03:00)

Date	Time	Round
Saturday, 2 October 2021	11:30	R1 (1/128)
Saturday, 2 October 2021	20:00	R2 (1/64)
Sunday, 3 October 2021	11:20	R3 (1/32)
Sunday, 3 October 2021	16:40	R4 (1/16)
Sunday, 3 October 2021	19:50	Quarterfinals
Tuesday, 5 October 2021	11:20	Semifinals
Tuesday, 5 October 2021	16:00	Final

== Main bracket ==
=== Top Draw ===
==== Section 1 ====
Round of 128
(Thailand) P Saelee	6	11	8	13	1
(Jordan) K Khader	11	7	11	15	3
(Saudi Arabia) A Al-Khadrawi	12	11	11	3
(Chinese Taipei) Huang Y-c	10	4	9	0
(Kyrgyzstan) T Sagyndykov	4	5	4	0
(Kazakhstan) A Kurmangaliyev	11	11	11	3
(Nepal) A Malla	9	8	9	0
(Sri Lanka) P Silva	11	11	11	3
(Pakistan) MS Khan	11	11	11	3
(Afghanistan) B Daneshmand	2	3	9	0
(Hong Kong) Lam S-h	11	6	10	6	1
(Iran) No Alamian	7	11	12	11	3
(Kuwait) M Al-Rashidi	6	9	8	0
(Singapore) Chua JSH	11	11	11	3

Round of 64
1	(South Korea) Jang W-j	11	11	11	3
(Jordan) K Khader	8	5	9	0
(Saudi Arabia) A Al-Khadrawi	14	11	11	3
(Kazakhstan) A Kurmangaliyev	12	3	5	0
(Sri Lanka) P Silva	11	11	11	3
(Pakistan) MS Khan	4	6	5	0
(Iran) No Alamian	11	11	13	3
(Singapore) Chua JSH	9	6	11	0

Round of 32
1	(South Korea) Jang W-j	11	11	11	3
(Saudi Arabia) A Al-Khadrawi	5	6	4	0
(Sri Lanka) P Silva	4	4	4	0
(Iran) No Alamian	11	11	11	3

Round of 16
1	(South Korea) Jang W-j	12	11	11	3
(Iran) No Alamian	10	6	8	0

==== Section 2 ====
Round of 128
(United Arab Emirates) A Al-Balooshi	8	3	6	0
(South Korea) Lim J-h	11	11	11	3
(Sri Lanka) M Lakshitha	6	11	11	2	4	2
(Uzbekistan) M Uktamboev	11	8	7	11	11	3
(Japan) K Yoshimura	11	10	11	11	3
(Mongolia) B Batkhishig	5	12	5	6	1
(Bangladesh) MA Ridoy	11	11	11	3
(Oman) M Al-Balushi	7	7	7	0
(Maldives) AK Akhyar	6	1	5	0
(Qatar) AK Al-Mohannadi	11	11	11	3
(Saudi Arabia) N Al-Jadai	11	6	11	11	3
(Jordan) Z Aldmaisy	8	11	7	4	1

Round of 64
(Palestine) Y Abou Sef	3	5	5	0
(South Korea) Lim J-h	11	11	11	3
(Uzbekistan) M Uktamboev	2	7	3	0
(Japan) K Yoshimura	11	11	11	3
(Bangladesh) MA Ridoy	8	11	8	11	8	2
(Qatar) AK Al-Mohannadi	11	7	11	9	11	3
(Saudi Arabia) N Al-Jadai	3	10	1	0
6	(India) S Gnanasekaran	11	12	11	3

Round of 32
(South Korea) Lim J-h	11	5	7	11	12	2
(Japan) K Yoshimura	9	11	11	7	14	3
(Qatar) AK Al-Mohannadi	2	6	11	9	1
6	(India) S Gnanasekaran	11	11	7	11	3

Round of 16
(Japan) K Yoshimura	11	6	11	11	3
6	(India) S Gnanasekaran	9	11	6	9	1

==== Section 3 ====
Round of 128
(Iraq) ZNM Mohammed	6	10	4	0
(Iran) A Ahmadian	11	12	11	3
(Oman) H Al-Mandhari	4	6	7	0
(Jordan) H Al-Hourani	11	11	11	3
(Tajikistan) U Sultonov	11	12	11	11	3
(Afghanistan) M Hosseini	8	14	7	1	1
(Saudi Arabia) K Al-Shareif
(Chinese Taipei) Chen C-a	wo
(Palestine) AA Al-Saqqa	2	8	3	0
(Singapore) Pang YEK	11	11	11	3
(Japan) Y Kizukuri	11	11	11	3
(Maldives) M Ahmed	5	3	4	0

Round of 64
7	(South Korea) An J-h	11	14	11	3
(Iran) A Ahmadian	6	12	9	0
(Jordan) H Al-Hourani	11	11	11	12	3
(Tajikistan) U Sultonov	13	8	9	10	1
(Chinese Taipei) Chen C-a	11	11	11	3
(Singapore) Pang YEK	3	2	4	0
(Japan) Y Kizukuri	11	11	11	3
(Uzbekistan) A Anorboev	2	5	5	0

Round of 32
7	(South Korea) An J-h	11	11	11	3
(Jordan) H Al-Hourani	6	5	8	0
(Chinese Taipei) Chen C-a	9	13	9	8	1
(Japan) Y Kizukuri	11	11	11	11	3

Round of 16
7	(South Korea) An J-h	11	6	7	11	4	2
(Japan) Y Kizukuri	3	11	11	5	11	3

==== Section 4 ====
Round of 128
(Hong Kong) Li HM	12	11	11	3
(Bangladesh) R Bawm	10	8	5	0
(Mongolia) S-O Gankhuyag	7	11	11	9	11	3
(Nepal) B Khaniya	11	8	6	11	9	2
(United Arab Emirates) Z Sarhan	3	2	11	0
(Sri Lanka) N Ranchagoda	11	11	13	3
(Qatar) A Al-Awlaqi	7	6	5	0
(India) H Desai	11	11	11	3
(Iran) Ni Alamian	11	11	11	3
(Kyrgyzstan) Ak Kasymov	6	6	8	0
(Indonesia) RN Niman	11	11	11	3
(Bahrain) SM Abuhamda	8	5	4	0

Round of 64
(Kazakhstan) I Artukmetov	11	6	1	9	1
(Hong Kong) Li HM	9	11	11	11	3
(Mongolia) S-O Gankhuyag	11	11	9	11	3
(Sri Lanka) N Ranchagoda	6	6	11	4	1
(India) J Desai	8	8	11	6	1
(Iran) Ni Alamian	11	11	7	11	3
(Indonesia) RN Niman	4	7	9	0
4	(Chinese Taipei) Chuang C-y	11	11	11	3

Round of 32
(Hong Kong) Li HM	11	11	11	3
(Mongolia) S-O Gankhuyag	2	5	3	0
(Iran) Ni Alamian	9	8	12	5	1
4	(Chinese Taipei) Chuang C-y	11	11	10	11	3

Round of 16
(Hong Kong) Li HM	5	2	9	0
4	(Chinese Taipei) Chuang C-y	11	11	11	3

=== Bottom Draw ===
==== Section 5 ====
Round of 128
(Japan) Y Muramatsu	11	11	11	3
(Jordan) M Salameh	5	2	6	0
(Saudi Arabia) A Bu Shulaybi	11	11	11	3
(Oman) Asad Al-Raisi	2	6	5	0
(Iraq) A Al-Nuaimi	11	11	11	3
(Pakistan) F Khawaja	5	7	7	0
(Bangladesh) M Hamza	3	3	2	0
(Singapore) Beh KT	11	11	11	3
(Kazakhstan) A Kenzhigulov	9	11	11	5	11	3
(Chinese Taipei) Sun C-h	11	8	8	11	7	2
(United Arab Emirates) S Al-Balushi	9	4	5	0
(Hong Kong) Ho KT	11	11	11	3

Round of 64
3	(South Korea) Lee S-s	12	11	10	15	3
(Japan) Y Muramatsu	10	5	12	13	1
(Saudi Arabia) A Bu Shulaybi	11	8	10	8	1
(Iraq) A Al-Nuaimi	9	11	12	11	3
(Singapore) Beh KT	5	7	3	0
(Kazakhstan) A Kenzhigulov	11	11	11	3
(Hong Kong) Ho KT	11	11	11	11	3
(Uzbekistan) N Panov	4	8	13	2	1

Round of 32
3	(South Korea) Lee S-s	19	11	11	3
(Iraq) A Al-Nuaimi	17	8	7	0
(Kazakhstan) A Kenzhigulov	8	11	5	8	1
(Hong Kong) Ho KT	11	9	11	11	3

Round of 16
3	(South Korea) Lee S-s	11	6	11	11	3
(Hong Kong) Ho KT	5	11	5	8	1

==== Section 6 ====
Round of 128
(Indonesia) FF Fadilah	11	11	5	6	11	3
(Maldives) M Naseem	4	5	11	11	3	2
(Bahrain) R Rashed	11	11	11	3
(Mongolia) M Jargalsaikhan	8	4	7	0
(Qatar) M Abdulwahhab	11	11	11	3
(Sri Lanka) I Kulappuwa	2	7	8	0
(Kuwait) M Al-Enezy	11	5	12	9	1
(Tajikistan) Z Dzhalil	6	11	14	11	3
(Afghanistan) M Bakhtiyari	12	11	10	11	3
(Kyrgyzstan) At Kasymov	10	6	12	5	1
(Nepal) S Shrestha	5	2	7	0
(Iran) MA Roueintan	11	11	11	3

Round of 64
(Thailand) N Thanmathikom	11	9	9	11	6	2
(Indonesia) FF Fadilah	6	11	11	5	11	3
(Bahrain) R Rashed	6	11	11	8	10	2
(Qatar) M Abdulwahhab	11	8	4	11	12	3
(Tajikistan) Z Dzhalil	11	11	11	3
(Afghanistan) M Bakhtiyari	9	6	8	0
(Iran) MA Roueintan	10	7	7	0
5	(India) SK Achanta	12	11	11	3

Round of 32
(Indonesia) FF Fadilah	6	1	11	5	1
(Qatar) M Abdulwahhab	11	11	9	11	3
(Tajikistan) Z Dzhalil	6	3	4	0
5	(India) SK Achanta	11	11	11	3

Round of 16
(Qatar) M Abdulwahhab	8	10	6	0
5	(India) SK Achanta	11	12	11	3

==== Section 7 ====
Round of 128
(Indonesia) BM Pratikto	8	11	8	11	11	3
(Thailand) S Nuchchart	11	8	11	6	3	2
(Bangladesh) MR Sabbir	11	6	8	7	1
(Maldives) M Shaffan	8	11	11	11	3
(Qatar) F Al-Mughanne	11	4	5	0
(India) MV Thakkar	13	11	11	3
(Uzbekistan) Z Kenjaev	4	11	9	11	9	2
(Singapore) Chew ZYC	11	5	11	5	11	3
(Bahrain) M Saleh	11	11	11	3
(Tajikistan) J Ismoilov	4	5	1	0
(Hong Kong) Ng PN	7	11	11	11	3
(Jordan) Z Abo Yaman	11	7	6	8	1

Round of 64
8	(Kazakhstan) K Gerassimenko	11	11	11	3
(Indonesia) BM Pratikto	8	9	6	0
(Maldives) M Shaffan	5	7	4	0
(India) MV Thakkar	11	11	11	3
(Singapore) Chew ZYC	11	11	11	3
(Bahrain) M Saleh	7	7	2	0
(Hong Kong) Ng PN	8	6	11	8	1
(Japan) H Shinozuka	11	11	8	11	3

Round of 32
8	(Kazakhstan) K Gerassimenko	12	11	8	13	3
(India) MV Thakkar	10	5	11	11	1
(Singapore) Chew ZYC	7	8	5	0
(Japan) H Shinozuka	11	11	11	3

Round of 16
8	(Kazakhstan) K Gerassimenko	5	6	9	0
(Japan) H Shinozuka	11	11	11	3

==== Section 8 ====
Round of 128
(Iran) AH Hodaei	5	4	8	0
(South Korea) Cho S-m	11	11	11	3
(Singapore) Tan L	11	4	12	11	3
(Iraq) A Hameed	9	11	10	9	1
(Palestine) NFM Samara	12	11	5	5	6	2
(Sri Lanka) C Ginige	10	5	11	11	11	3
(Saudi Arabia) A Al-Abbad	11	7	13	8	4	2
(Chinese Taipei) Feng Y-h	9	11	11	11	11	3
(India) S Shetty	11	5	11	11	3
(Kuwait) J Al-Balhan	6	11	6	6	1
(United Arab Emirates) J Linjawi	7	12	4	8	1
(Pakistan) M Rameez	11	10	11	11	3
(Yemen) EA Gubran	4	5	3	0
(Japan) S Togami	11	11	11	3

Round of 64
(South Korea) Cho S-m	11	11	12	3
(Singapore) Tan L	3	6	10	0
(Sri Lanka) C Ginige	2	3	4	0
(Chinese Taipei) Feng Y-h	11	11	11	3
(India) S Shetty	11	11	11	3
(Pakistan) M Rameez	3	7	2	0
(Japan) S Togami	11	11	15	3
2	(Hong Kong) Wong C-t	7	8	13	0

Round of 32
(South Korea) Cho S-m	11	12	4	3	7	2
(Chinese Taipei) Feng Y-h	6	10	11	11	11	3
(India) S Shetty	7	11	13	9	9	2
(Japan) S Togami	11	9	11	11	11	3

Round of 16
(Chinese Taipei) Feng Y-h	3	6	6	0
(Japan) S Togami	11	11	11	3

== Final bracket ==
Quarterfinals
1	(South Korea) Jang W-j	11	11	11	3
(Japan) K Yoshimura	4	4	4	0
(Japan) Y Kizukuri	9	4	5	0
4	(Chinese Taipei) Chuang C-y	11	11	11	3
3	(South Korea) Lee S-s	11	11	11	3
5	(India) SK Achanta	8	8	9	0
(Japan) H Shinozuka	7	9	11	11	8	2
(Japan) S Togami	11	11	9	5	11	3

Semifinals
1	(South Korea) Jang W-j	11	12	7	9	1
4	(Chinese Taipei) Chuang C-y	6	14	11	11	3
3	(South Korea) Lee S-s	8	13	12	11	3
(Japan) S Togami	11	11	10	6	1

Final
4	(Chinese Taipei) Chuang C-y	12	6	6	11	8	2
3	(South Korea) Lee S-s	10	11	11	7	11	3
