= Sharath Kamal =

Indian table tennis player

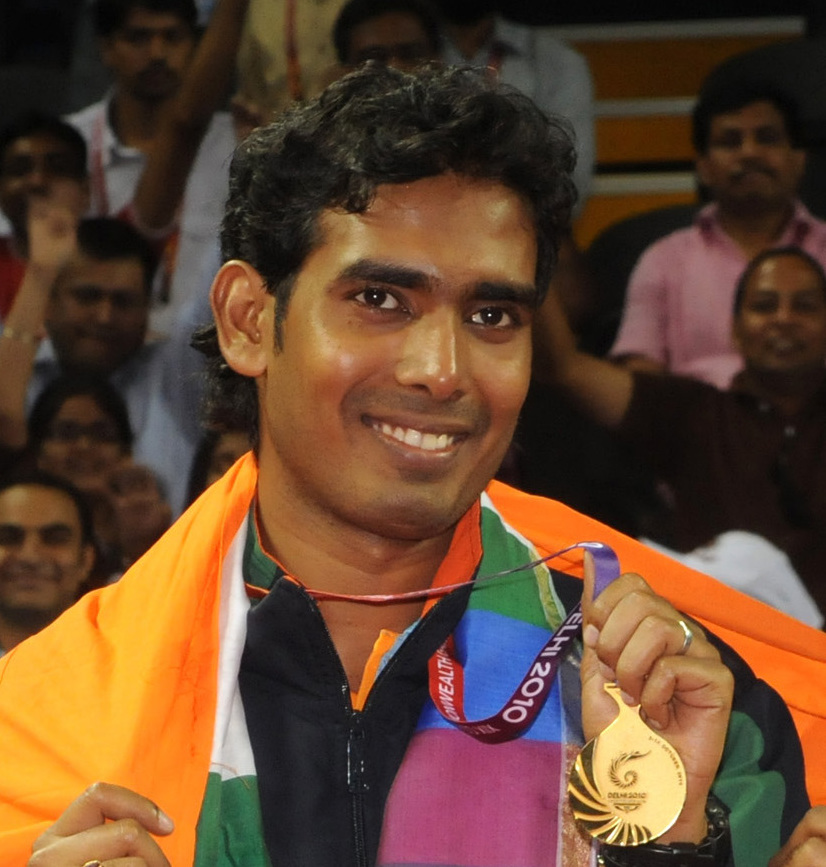
- Kamal at the 2010 Commonwealth Games in New Delhi

Personal information
- Full name: Sharath Kamal Achanta
- Born: 12 July 1982 (age 44) Chennai, Tamil Nadu, India
- Height: 1.86 m (6 ft 1 in)
- Weight: 82 kg (181 lb)

Sport
- Sport: Table tennis
- Playing style: Right-handed, shakehand grip
- Highest ranking: 30 (2019)
- Current ranking: 42 (2025)
Medal record
Men's table tennis
Representing India
Commonwealth Games
Gold medal – first place	2006 Melbourne	Men's singles
Gold medal – first place	2006 Melbourne	Men's team
Gold medal – first place	2010 Delhi	Men's doubles
Gold medal – first place	2018 Gold Coast	Men's team
Gold medal – first place	2022 Birmingham	Men's singles
Gold medal – first place	2022 Birmingham	Mixed doubles
Gold medal – first place	2022 Birmingham	Men's team
Silver medal – second place	2014 Glasgow	Men's doubles
Silver medal – second place	2018 Gold Coast	Men's doubles
Silver medal – second place	2022 Birmingham	Men's doubles
Bronze medal – third place	2010 Delhi	Men's singles
Bronze medal – third place	2010 Delhi	Men's team
Bronze medal – third place	2018 Gold Coast	Men's singles
Asian Games
Bronze medal – third place	2018 Jakarta	Men's team
Bronze medal – third place	2018 Jakarta	Mixed doubles
Asian Championships
Bronze medal – third place	2021 Doha	Men's team
Bronze medal – third place	2021 Doha	Men's doubles
Bronze medal – third place	2023 Pyeongchang	Men's team
Bronze medal – third place	2024 Astana	Men's team

Achanta Sharath Kamal (born 12 July 1982) is an Indian former table tennis player. He is a ten time national champion. In 2019, he was awarded the Padma Shri, India's fourth highest civilian award. In 2022, he was awarded the Khel Ratna Award, India's highest sporting honour. He beat Joo Se Hyuk and Chuang Chih-yuan, world no. 8 and 16 respectively, in the 2015 28th Asian Cup at Jaipur. He was awarded the Arjuna Award back in 2004. He announced his retirement from the sport in 2025.

He won the gold at the Commonwealth Championship held at Kuala Lumpur in 2004. He won the gold at the 2006 Commonwealth Games in Melbourne, beating crowd fave William Henzell in the final and helped clinch gold in the team event against Singapore. He teamed up with Subhajit Saha to win the doubles gold at the 2010 Commonwealth Games in New Delhi. He won three medals in 2018 Commonwealth Games; gold in men's team event; silver in men's doubles; and bronze in men's singles event.

Sharath qualified for the 2016 Rio Olympics after beating Iran's Noshad Alamian in the Asian Olympic qualification. However, he made a first round exit in the men's individual event.

He is an alumnus of PSBB Nungambakkam school (class of 2000) and Loyola College, Chennai. He is employed with the Indian Oil Corporation as an officer.

== Early life and career ==
Achanta Sharath Kamal was born on 12 July 1982 into a Telugu-speaking family of Achanta Srinivasa Rao and Achanta Annapurna in Madras (now Chennai), India. Sharath was introduced to Table Tennis by his father at the age of 4. Sharath's father along with his uncle Muralidhar Rao taught him the technicalities of the game and groomed him to be a professional paddler. Both his father and uncle were state-level players and national-level coaches.

Sharath couldn't handle his mental attitude as he would always want to win rather than accept defeat. The defeat was something that he would often get frustrated at. His father and uncle helped him with mental conditioning. Sharath's uncle had made a strict rule for him to deal with his frustration. He had spent his time practicing table tennis with his uncle before and after school every day. At the age of 16, Sharath Kamal began his professional career and took part in state-level competitions. Sharath Kamal has been in top form since his foray into professional table tennis.

== Domestic career ==
After his success at state meets, Sharath advanced to the national level. He bagged a bronze at 2002 National Games of India in singles and mixed doubles events with Pradeera Thiruvengadam and a silver medal in team event where in the gold medal match against Bengal he lost his match to Sourav Chakraborty 3–2(11–9, 8–11, 6–11, 11–2, 13–11). Sharath Kamal lost in the final of the senior national championships in 2002. In 2003, Sharath became the National Champion for the first time at the National Table Tennis Championships. He again won the nationals in 2004. From 2006 to 2010, Kamal won the senior nationals five times consecutively. In 2007 nationals, Sharath made a clean sweep of 4 golds. He defeated Sourav Chakraborty in singles final. He and Subhajit Saha defeated Sourav Chakraborty and Anirban Nandi in doubles final. He won mixed doubles gold with Poulomi Ghatak by defeating Subhajit Saha and Nandita Saha. In team event his team PSPB defeated RSPB. In 2009, he again won team event and singles gold by defeating Sourav Chakraborty. He also clinched a bronze in doubles event with Subhajit Saha. He again won the singles title in 2010 nationals by defeating Soumyadeep Roy in a 7 games thrilling match. He also won gold in team event.

In 2011, he won the gold in team event. But he lost to Anthony Amalraj in singles final. In 2012, he lost to young Soumyajit Ghosh in finals of 74th senior nationals. But won the team event with PSPB. He lost to Harmeet Desai in semi-finals at 2013–14 nationals. But again managed to win team event. In 2015–16 nationals, he lost to Sathiyan Gnanasekaran in straight games in semi-finals. He defeated Sathiyan in 2018–19 nationals 4–3 to win his ninth national title becoming first player to do and surpassing legendary Kamlesh Mehta's record of 8 titles. He also won team event gold. But Sathiyan got his revenge defeating him in final of 2020–21 nationals. Sharath won his 10th title in 2021–22 nationals by defeating Sathiyan in the singles final. In the match, he was trailing by 3–1 but came back from behind and won the match 4–3(7–11, 12–10, 9–11, 7–11, 12–10, 11–9, 11–6).

== Professional career ==
=== 2002: Early Breakthrough ===
The national call-up finally came on the eve of the 2002 Commonwealth Games, where he was selected for a 16-member probables training camp. It was the break Sharath Kamal needed to launch his career at the age of 20. Although he was not selected for main squad the experience at the camp gave him confidence and the exposure to top-level players made him better. Sharath Kamal made it to the final of the senior national championships in 2002 and though he lost, he was soon drafted into the national team.

=== 2003: World Championships Debut ===
Sharath was selected for 2003 World Table Tennis Championships alongside Chetan Baboor and Sourav Chakraborty. This was his first world championships appearance and his first major tournament. He defeated Tahiti's Sylvain Motahu 11–3, 11–3, 11–4, 11–7 in the first group stage match. This was his first world championships win. He also won men's doubles first round match with Chetan Baboor defeating Santoago Coste and Hector Berrios of Puerto Rico 9–11, 11–7, 11–6, 11–4. But lost mixed doubles first round match with Pradeera Thiruuengadam to Indika Silva and Deepika Rodrigo of Sri Lanka 11–8, 10–12, 8–11, 11–9, 8–11. He then scored a straight-games win over Lithuania's Arturas Orlovas, winning 11–4, 11–4, 13–11, 12–10 to qualify for main draw. He made a promising start against 57th ranked Christophe Legout of France as he won the opening game 11–2. But the Frenchman overcame the early hiccups to take the next four games 11–6, 11–6, 15–13, 11–6 comfortably to win the match 4–1 and end Sharath's campaign.

=== 2004: Olympics, South Asian Games Debut and Commonwealth Championships Gold ===
Sharath was selected for 2004 World Team Table Tennis Championships. India played in second division of the championship. In the first match against Slovenia he defeated S Ignjatovic 3–2(4–11 12–10 11–9 6–11 11–8) as India opened their account by defeating Slovenia 3–2. India lost their next match against Slovakia. In the next match against Portugal he easily won his match against João Monteiro in straight games 4–0(13–11, 11–7, 11–7) as India comfortably won the match 3–0. He defeated El-sayed Lashin 3–2(10–12, 3–11, 11–8, 15–13, 11–8) and S Diaa by 3–2(7–11, 11–9, 9–11, 11–8, 11–6) as India won the match by same margin against Egypt in last group stage match.

Sharath Kamal was selected to represent India at 2004 South Asian Games. This was his South Asian Games debut. He won the team event gold as India thrashed Pakistan in the gold medal match 3–0. He opened his team's account by defeating Farjad Saif Khan in straight games after that his compatriots Subhajit Saha and Soumyadeep Roy completed the formalities to win the gold medal. He won the mixed doubles gold medal partnering Vishaka Vijay defeating compatriots Roy and Mantu Ghosh in the gold medal match 3–1(8–11, 11–7, 11–9, 11–10) in an all India final. He and Roy reached men's doubles final by defeating Sri Lankan duo Thilina Laknath and Indika Prasad 3–1(11–4, 11–4, 9–11, 11–7) in semi-finals. They defeated compatriots Subhajit Saha and Ranbir Das in an all Indian final. Sharath was denied a fourth gold in singles. He reached singles final by defeating Rajendra Kapali of Nepal and Piyadasa Thilina Laknath of Sri Lanka both in straight games. But lost to compatriot Soumyadeep Roy in the final. He lost the first game 11–9 but came back by winning next two games 11–9,11–7. Roy won the fourth game 11–6 and he won the fifth game 11–9 but Roy came back from behind winning next two games 11–5,11–4 to win the gold medal.

Sharath's first international singles gold medal came at the 2004 Commonwealth Table Tennis Championships where he won men's singles gold. He also won men's team event where his team defeated England 3–1 in the final. He qualified for 2004 Olympics which gave a new high in his career graph. At his Olympics debut he defeated Mohamed Sofiane Boudjadja of Algeria in first round in straight games but bowed out in second round losing to Ko Lai Chak of Hong Kong in straight games.

=== 2005 ===
Kamal competed at 2005 World Table Tennis Championships but lost to top seed and eventual world champion Wang Liqin in first round 4–1 but managed to take the third game 11–9. In the mixed doubles, he and Mamta Prabhu got a walkover from Bode Abiodun and Atisi Owoh of Nigeria in the first round. In the second, they were defeated by the Singaporean pair of Xiao Li Cai and Jia Wei Li.

=== 2006: Commonwealth Games, South Asiad Golds and Asian Games ===
Sharath made his Commonwealth Games debut at 2006 Commonwealth Games. He was the top seed in singles, which gave him a bye to directly round of 32. He swept Jason Sugrue in the first round but dropped one game against Andrew Rushton and two games against Cai Xiaoli in the next two matches, which he still managed to win. In the semi-finals, he defeated Segun Toriola in straight games to reach the final. He won the gold medal by defeating William Henzell of Australia in the gold medal match 4–3 in a thrilling 40 minutes match. He became the first Indian to win table tennis gold at the Commonwealth Games. He also won the gold the medal in men's team event, where his team defeated Singapore in the final 3–2. He lost his first match against Cai Xiaoli which reduced India 0–2 in the gold medal. However, team India came back, as Subhajit Saha won his match, and Sharath won his second match against Yang Zi, which levelled things at 2–2. Soumyadeep Roy sealed the match by winning his match against Cai Xiaoli. This was Indian table tennis team's first ever Commonwealth gold. He partnered Soumyadeep Roy for men's doubles but lost in the quarter-finals to Andrew Baggaley and Andrew Rushton 3–2(8–11,12–10,7–11,11–6 and 4–11).

In December, Sharath made his Asian Games debut at 2006 Asian Games. He was 13th seed, received bye to Round of 32. He beat Đoàn Kiến Quốc of Vietnam 11–6,11–7,13–15,11–5,11–9 in round of 32. Then, he bowed out in the round of 16, losing to Chiang Peng-lung 5–11,5–11,8–11,4–11. In doubles, he paired with Soumyadeep Roy but was ousted in round of 32, losing 9–11,9–11,9–11 to a Vietnamese pair. In the team event, he won and lost two individual matches. Eventually, his team finished third in the group, unable to advance any further.

=== 2007 ===
In the year 2007 he was the first Indian to win the Pyongyang Invitational Tournament held at Pyongyang, North Korea. This was the 21st edition of the tournament, which was held in August 2007. His best performance on the world circuit came in the Japan Pro Tour held in June 2007, where he beat World No.19, Lee Jung Woo (South Korea). In the World Championships, Sharath once again had a first round exit, like his last appearance, losing to Polish no. 28 seed Lucjan Błaszczyk 8–11,6–11,9–11,9–11. In the doubles event, he paired with Soumyadeep Roy and went on to beat Austrian pair of Stefan Fegerl and Werner Schlager 11–4,6–11,9–11,11–9,11–8. This was his first ever match win in World Championships. However, they lost in the second round to Serbian pair of Aleksandar Karakašević and Slobodan Grujić 12–10,11–5,11–6,11–3. In the mixed doubles event, he paired up with Poulomi Ghatak but lost in the first round to Xu Xin and Guo Yan 9–11,13–11,5–11,4–11 and 6–11.

=== 2008 ===
Sharath qualified for 2008 Olympics, where he beat Alfredo Carneros of Spain in first round 4–2 but lost to Chen Weixing of Austria 1–4.

=== 2020: 2nd Career Title ===
Sharath won the 2020 ITTF Challenger Plus Oman Open men's singles title. He outclassed top seeded Marcos Freitas of Portugal 6–11, 11–8, 12–10, 11–9, 3–11, 17–15 in a 1 hour long final. This was his 1st title in 10 years.

=== 2021: Olympics 3rd Round and Asian Championships Bronzes ===
In March 2021, Sharath played at WTT Star Contender Doha, where he upset Patrick Franziska in the round of 32, but lost to Dimitrij Ovtcharov in next round in straight games 3–0.

He competed in the men's singles event at the 2020 Summer Olympics but suffered a 1-4 third round exit against the defending gold medalist Ma Long, who went on to win his second Olympic table tennis singles gold medal against Fan Zhendong.

He also competed in the 2021 Asian Table Tennis Championships. He reached the quarter-final of the men's singles event, where he was eliminated by the eventual winner Lee Sang-su. However, he won bronze in the men's doubles event together with Sathiyan Gnanasekaran. Together with Sanil Shetty, Harmeet Desai, Manav Thakkar, and his doubles partner Sathiyan Gnanasekaran, India won bronze in the men's team event.

=== 2022 ===
He competed at the 1st ever WTT grand smash, the Singapore Smash 2022. He had a 1st round exit in singles after losing to Anton Källberg, whereas in doubles, he paired up Sathiyan Gnanasekaran but lost to Lim Jong-hoon and Jang Woo-jin 0–3. He bagged a bronze at WTT Contender Doha 2022. Kamal faced upcoming Chinese Star, Yuan Licen, in the semi-finals and played a 1 hour long hard fought match, which he eventually lost 4–3 (5–11,11–8,6–11,11–7,11–5,10–12 and 9–11). On the day of his 40th birthday, Kamal defeated Enzo Angles and Vitor Ishiy to qualify for the main draw of WTT Star Contender European Series. He then defeated Lubomir Pistej in straight games in first round but lost to 7th seed and world no. 8 Darko Jorgic in straight games in next round.

40-year-old Sharath Kamal won his 4th medal at the Commonwealth Games in Birmingham when he defeated Liam Pitchford of England to win Gold in the Men's Singles table tennis category. Also, Sharath Kamal won Silver in Men's Doubles partnering with Sathiyan Gnanasekaran & another Gold in Mixed Doubles category with Sreeja Akula in Birmingham 2022. Earlier, he won Gold in Men's Team in this sports meet with Harmeet Desai, Sathiyan Gnanasekaran and Sanil Shetty.

=== 2023 ===
In July 2023, Sharath Kamal's team Chennai Lions came second in Ultimate Table Tennis season 4. In August 2023, Sharath Kamal ranking dropped to world rank 106, this is the first time since 2007 that Kamal has gone out of top 100 World Rankings.

=== 2024; Paris 2024 Olympics ===
On 8 July 2024, the Indian Olympic Committee designated him and the professional badminton player P.V. Sindhu as the flag bearers to the París 2024 Olympic Games.

Unfortunately, he had a shock first round exit in the Men's singles Round of 64 against Deni Kožul of Slovenia.

== Club career ==
After playing for San Sebastian in the Spanish league for a while, he moved to the German Tischtennis-Bundesliga for TSV Gräfelfing in the 2010/2011 season. In March 2011 he played for the Bundesliga club SV Werder Bremen, which he left in 2012 for Italy to join the first division club Siracusa. However, since this dissolved and Sharath Kamal could not join a new club because the change period had expired, he kept fit as a non-club at the Trainingszentrum DTTZ in Düsseldorf. In 2013, Borussia Düsseldorf signed him for a year to replace Christian Süss, who was injured on a long-term basis, and became German champions several times with the team and cup winner. His contract with Düsseldorf was extended until 2017. For the season 2017/18 he moved to TTC Schwalbe Bergneustadt; he returned to Düsseldorf for the season 2018/19. His contract was again extended for 2022/23 season by Borussia Düsseldorf.

== Commonwealth Games Medals ==
Medal	Sport	Event	Date
Gold	Table Tennis – Men's Singles	2006 Commonwealth Games – Melbourne	26 March 2006
Gold	Table Tennis – Men's Team	2006 Commonwealth Games – Melbourne	27 March 2006
Gold	Table Tennis – Men's Doubles	2010 Commonwealth Games – Delhi	13 October 2010
Bronze	Table Tennis – Men's Team	2010 Commonwealth Games – Delhi	9 October 2010
Gold	Table Tennis – Men's Team	2018 Commonwealth Games – Gold Coast	9 April 2018
Silver	Table Tennis – Men's Doubles	2018 Commonwealth Games – Gold Coast	14 April 2018
Bronze	Table Tennis – Men's Singles	2018 Commonwealth Games – Gold Coast	15 April 2018
Bronze	Table Tennis – Mixed Doubles	2018 Commonwealth Games – Gold Coast	15 April 2018

=== Commonwealth Games ===
13 medals – (7 gold, 3 silver, 3 bronze)

Event	Singles	Doubles	Mixed Doubles	Team
(Australia) 2006 Melbourne	Gold	QF	–	Gold
(India) 2010 New Delhi	Bronze	Gold	R16	Bronze
(Scotland) 2014 Glasgow	4th	Silver	QF	4th
(Australia) 2018 Gold Coast	Bronze	Silver	4th	Gold
(England) 2022 Birmingham	Gold	Silver	Gold	Gold

=== Asian Games ===
2 medals – (0 gold, 0 silver, 2 bronze)

Event	Singles	Doubles	Mixed Doubles	Team
(Qatar) 2006 Doha	R16	R32	R32	GS
(China) 2010 Guangzhou	R16	R16	R16	QF
(South Korea) 2014 Incheon	R32	R16	R32	QF
(Indonesia) 2018 Jakarta-Palembang	R16	Not Held	Bronze	Bronze

== Awards ==
- 2004: Arjuna Award
- 2019: Padma Shri
- 2022: Khel Ratna Award

== See also ==
- Mamta Prabhu
- Poulomi Ghatak
- Mouma Das

Olympic Games
Preceded by Mary Kom; Manpreet Singh	Flagbearer for India (with P.V. Sindhu); París 2024	Succeeded by Incumbent
