= Nima Alamian =

Iranian table tennis player (born 1992)

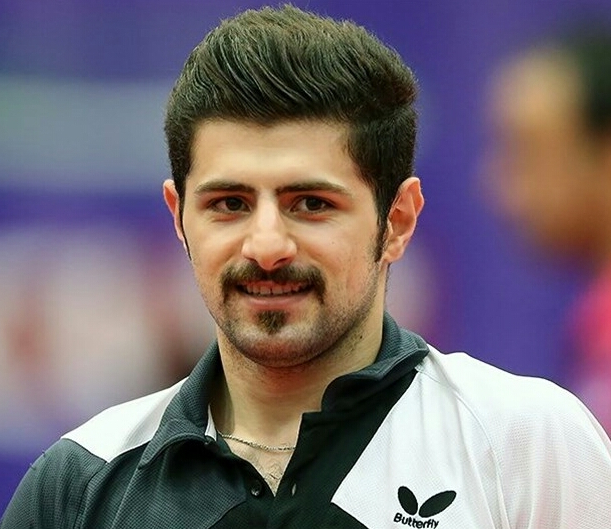
- Alamian in 2016

Personal information
- Full name: Nima Alamian Darounkolaei
- Born: 24 December 1992 (age 33) Babol, Mazandaran, Iran
- Height: 1.74 m (5 ft 9 in)

Sport
- Sport: Table tennis
- Club: Petrochimi Bandar Imam
- Playing style: Right-handed shakehand
- Highest ranking: 60 (April 2019)
- Current ranking: 388 (2 November 2026)
Medal record
Men's table tennis
Representing Iran
Asian Games
Bronze medal – third place	2022 Hangzhou	Doubles
Bronze medal – third place	2022 Hangzhou	Team
Islamic Solidarity Games
Gold medal – first place	2017 Baku	Team
Gold medal – first place	2021 Konya	Team
Silver medal – second place	2017 Baku	Singles
Silver medal – second place	2021 Konya	Singles

Nima Alamian (Persian: نیما عالمیان; born 24 December 1992 in Babol) is an Iranian table tennis player. He won at the 2016 Asian qualification tournament and qualified to the 2016 Summer Olympics, where he came in 49th.

Alamian won a bronze medal in doubles event at the WTT contender series Qatar 2021.

He also booked his place at Tokyo 2020 Summer Olympics after winning a gold medal at the Asian Olympic Qualification Tournament in Doha, Qatar. Nima Alamian defeated Uzbekistan's Zokida Kenjaev 4-2 (8–11, 7–11, 11–4, 11–4, 13–11, 11–7) in the final match. Alamian will represent Iran at the Games after securing the top spot in the Central Asia region men's singles event. He has qualified to represent Iran at the 2020 Summer Olympics.

His older brother, Noshad, is also a table tennis player. Playing together in the men's team and men's doubles events at the 2022 Asian Games, the brothers won two bronze medals.

On 9 January 2026, Alamian publicly commented on the 2025–2026 Iranian protests on his Instagram, stating: "Pray for Iran".

== Major results ==
Year	Venue	Singles	Doubles	Team
Olympics
2016	Rio de Janeiro, Brazil	First Round		
2020	Tokyo, Japan	First Round		
2024	Paris, France	Round of 64		
World Championships (Individual)
2011	Rotterdam, Netherlands	Qualification	Qualification	
2013	Paris, France	Qualification	Round of 64	
2015	Suzhou, China	Round of 128	Round of 64	
2017	Düsseldorf, Germany	Round of 64	Round of 32	
2019	Budapest, Hungary	Round of 64	Round of 32	
2021	Houston, United States		Round of 32	
2023	Durban, South Africa	Round of 128	Round of 64	
2025	Doha, Qatar	did not participate		
World Championships (Team)
2012	Dortmund, Germany			33rd place
2014	Tokyo, Japan			29th place
2016	Kuala Lumpur, Malaysia			33rd place
2018	Halmstad, Sweden			26th place
2022	Chengdu, China			Group Stage
2024	(South Korea) Busan, China			Round of 16
2026	London, England	did not participate		
Asian Games
2014	Incheon, South Korea	Round of 16	Round of 16	
2018	Jakarta, Indonesia	Round of 16		Quarterfinals
2022	Hangzhou, China		Bronze medal	Bronze medal
2026	Nagoya, Japan		Quarterfinals	Quarterfinals
Asian Championships
2011	Macau, China	Round of 64	Round of 32	9th place
2013	Busan, South Korea	Round of 16	Round of 64	8th place
2017	Wuxi, China	did not participate		
2019	Yogyakarta, Indonesia	Round of 32	Round of 16	7th place
2021	Doha, Qatar	Round of 32	Quarterfinals	5th place
2023	Pyeongchang, South Korea	Round of 64	Quarterfinals	6th place
2024	Astana, Kazakhstan	did not participate		
Islamic Solidarity Games
2017	Baku, Azerbaijan	Silver Medal		Gold Medal
2022	Konya, Turkey	Silver Medal		Gold Medal
