= 2021 Asian Table Tennis Championships – Men's doubles =

Table tennis competition

Men's doubles at the 2021 Asian Table Tennis Championships
- Venue: Lusail Sports Arena
- Date: 1 October 2021 – 4 October 2021
- Competitors: 90 from 29 nations

The men's doubles at the 2021 Asian Table Tennis Championships in Doha was held at Lusail Sports Arena from 1 to 4 October 2021.

== System of play ==
All individual events shall be played in a knock-out system. Matches in Singles events and Doubles events shall be played in best of five (5) games in all stages of the competition.

== Schedule ==
All times are Arabia Standard Time (UTC+03:00)

Date	Time	Round
Friday, 1 October 2021	16:45	R1 (1/64)
Saturday, 2 October 2021	9:30	R2 (1/32)
Saturday, 2 October 2021	15:30	R3 (1/16)
Sunday, 3 October 2021	14:40	Quarterfinals
Monday, 4 October 2021	10:00	Semifinals
Monday, 4 October 2021	16:00	Final

== Main bracket ==
Round of 64
(Kuwait) J Al-Balhan (Kuwait) M Al-Rashidi	9	3	5	0
(Jordan) Z Abo Yaman (Jordan) Z Aldmaisy	11	11	11	3
(Uzbekistan) N Panov (Uzbekistan) M Uktamboev	6	10	7	0
(Saudi Arabia) N Al-Jadai (Saudi Arabia) A Al-Abbad	11	12	11	3
(Indonesia) RN Niman (Indonesia) FF Fadilah	11	11	11	3
(Maldives) AK Akhyar (Maldives) M Naseem	3	9	6	0

Round of 32
1	(Iran) No Alamian (Iran) Ni Alamian	11	13	16	3
(Jordan) Z Abo Yaman (Jordan) Z Aldmaisy	9	11	14	0
(Sri Lanka) M Lakshitha (Sri Lanka) N Ranchagoda	11	9	11	9	9	2
(Bangladesh) MA Ridoy (Bangladesh) R Bawm	9	11	6	11	11	3
(Palestine) Y Abou Sef (Palestine) AA Al-Saqqa	8	6	6	0
(Saudi Arabia) N Al-Jadai (Saudi Arabia) A Al-Abbad	11	11	11	3
(Indonesia) RN Niman (Indonesia) FF Fadilah	4	4	7	0
6	(India) H Desai (India) MV Thakkar	11	11	11	3

Round of 16
1	(Iran) No Alamian (Iran) Ni Alamian	11	11	11	3
(Bangladesh) MA Ridoy (Bangladesh) R Bawm	6	5	7	0
(Saudi Arabia) N Al-Jadai (Saudi Arabia) A Al-Abbad	4	9	9	0
6	(India) H Desai (India) MV Thakkar	11	11	11	3

Quarterfinals
1	(Iran) No Alamian (Iran) Ni Alamian	10	5	6	0
6	(India) H Desai (India) MV Thakkar	12	11	11	3

Round of 64
(Chinese Taipei) Feng Y-h (Chinese Taipei) Sun C-h	11	11	11	3
(Pakistan) F Khawaja (Pakistan) MS Khan	8	7	4	0
(Japan) K Yoshimura (Japan) Y Kizukuri	11	11	11	3
(Oman) A Al-Raisi (Oman) H Al-Mandhari	2	9	4	0
(Afghanistan) M Bakhtiyari (Afghanistan) M Hosseini	2	10	5	0
(Kazakhstan) A Kenzhigulov (Kazakhstan) I Artukmetov	11	12	11	3
(Qatar) AK Al-Mohannadi (Qatar) M Abdulwahhab	11	7	11	8	8	2
(Nepal) S Shrestha (Nepal) B Khaniya	8	11	9	11	11	3

Round of 32
5	(South Korea) Jang W-j (South Korea) Lim J-h	11	4	11	11	3
(Chinese Taipei) Feng Y-h (Chinese Taipei) Sun C-h	1	11	2	6	1
(Japan) K Yoshimura (Japan) Y Kizukuri	11	9	9	11	11	3
(Singapore) Pang YEK (Singapore) Chua JSH	7	11	11	8	4	2
(United Arab Emirates) Z Sarhan (United Arab Emirates) J Linjawi	5	7	9	0
(Kazakhstan) A Kenzhigulov (Kazakhstan) I Artukmetov	11	11	11	3
(Nepal) S Shrestha (Nepal) B Khaniya	6	5	5	0
4	(Hong Kong) Wong CT (Hong Kong) Ho KK	11	11	11	3

Round of 16
5	(South Korea) Jang W-j (South Korea) Lim J-h	11	5	11	11	3
(Japan) K Yoshimura (Japan) Y Kizukuri	7	11	5	8	1
(Kazakhstan) A Kenzhigulov (Kazakhstan) I Artukmetov	7	3	4	0
4	(Hong Kong) Wong CT (Hong Kong) Ho KK	11	11	11	3

Quarterfinals
5	(South Korea) Jang W-j (South Korea) Lim J-h	11	11	8	11	3
4	(Hong Kong) Wong CT (Hong Kong) Ho KK	9	7	11	8	1

Round of 64
(Bangladesh) M Mufradul (Bangladesh) MR Sabbir	7	3	14	8	1
(Jordan) K Khader (Jordan) M Salameh	11	11	12	11	3
(Kazakhstan) K Gerassimenko (Kazakhstan) A Kurmangaliyev	11	11	12	3
(United Arab Emirates) S Al-Balushi (United Arab Emirates) A Al-Balooshi	7	4	10	0
(Qatar) A Al-Awlaqi (Qatar) F Al-Mughanne	7	11	11	11	3
(Kyrgyzstan) T Sagyndykov (Kyrgyzstan) A Kasymov	11	3	7	7	1

Round of 32
3	(Chinese Taipei) Chen C-a (Chinese Taipei) Huang Y-c	11	11	3	11	3
(Jordan) K Khader (Jordan) M Salameh	6	7	11	5	1
(Singapore) Chew ZYC (Singapore) Beh KT	11	11	11	3
(Iraq) A Hameed (Iraq) ZNM Mohammed	8	7	5	0
(Bahrain) M Saleh (Bahrain) R Rashed	7	7	11	11	10	2
(Kazakhstan) K Gerassimenko (Kazakhstan) A Kurmangaliyev	11	11	2	7	12	3
(Qatar) A Al-Awlaqi (Qatar) F Al-Mughanne	5	5	2	0
7	(India) SK Achanta (India) S Gnanasekaran	11	11	11	3

Round of 16
3	(Chinese Taipei) Chen C-a (Chinese Taipei) Huang Y-c	11	10	7	11	8	2
(Singapore) Chew ZYC (Singapore) Beh KT	7	12	11	8	11	3
(Kazakhstan) K Gerassimenko (Kazakhstan) A Kurmangaliyev	9	6	11	11	7	2
7	(India) SK Achanta (India) S Gnanasekaran	11	11	9	8	11	3

Quarterfinals
(Singapore) Chew ZYC (Singapore) Beh KT	9	7	10	0
7	(India) SK Achanta (India) S Gnanasekaran	11	11	12	3

Round of 64
(Thailand) S Nuchchart (Thailand) P Saelee	11	11	11	3
(Mongolia) M Jargalsaikhan (Mongolia) B Batkhishig	9	6	5	0
(Maldives) M Shaffan (Maldives) M Ahmed	5	4	7	0
(Saudi Arabia) A Al-Khadrawi (Saudi Arabia) Bu Shulaybi	11	11	11	3
(Iran) AH Hodaei (Iran) A Ahmadian	11	10	11	8	10	2
(Uzbekistan) Z Kenjaev (Uzbekistan) A Anorboev	6	12	9	11	12	3

Round of 32
8	(Hong Kong) Lam SH (Hong Kong) Ng PN	11	11	11	11	3
(Thailand) S Nuchchart (Thailand) P Saelee	13	4	7	5	1
(Saudi Arabia) A Al-Khadrawi (Saudi Arabia) Bu Shulaybi	11	12	11	3
(Tajikistan) U Sultonov (Tajikistan) Z Dzhalil	6	10	6	0
(South Korea) An J-h (South Korea) Cho S-m	11	11	11	3
(Sri Lanka) C Ginige (Sri Lanka) P Silva	5	7	2	0
(Uzbekistan) Z Kenjaev (Uzbekistan) A Anorboev	9	4	4	0
2	(Japan) Y Uda (Japan) S Togami	11	11	11	3

Round of 16
8	(Hong Kong) Lam SH (Hong Kong) Ng PN	11	11	11	3
(Saudi Arabia) A Al-Khadrawi (Saudi Arabia) Bu Shulaybi	5	7	6	0
(South Korea) An J-h (South Korea) Cho S-m	11	11	12	7	1
2	(Japan) Y Uda (Japan) S Togami	13	9	14	11	3

Quarterfinals
8	(Hong Kong) Lam SH (Hong Kong) Ng PN	4	11	5	2	1
2	(Japan) Y Uda (Japan) S Togami	11	9	11	11	3

== Final bracket ==
Quarterfinals
1	(Iran) No Alamian (Iran) Ni Alamian	10	5	6	0
6	(India) H Desai (India) MV Thakkar	12	11	11	3
5	(South Korea) Jang W-j (South Korea) Lim J-h	11	11	8	11	3
4	(Hong Kong) Wong CT (Hong Kong) Ho KK	9	7	11	8	1
(Singapore) Chew ZYC (Singapore) Beh KT	9	7	10	0
7	(India) SK Achanta (India) S Gnanasekaran	11	11	12	3
8	(Hong Kong) Lam SH (Hong Kong) Ng PN	4	11	5	2	1
2	(Japan) Y Uda (Japan) S Togami	11	9	11	11	3

Semifinals
6	(India) H Desai (India) MV Thakkar	4	6	12	11	8	2
5	(South Korea) Jang W-j (South Korea) Lim J-h	11	11	10	9	11	3
7	(India) SK Achanta (India) S Gnanasekaran	5	9	11	0
2	(Japan) Y Uda (Japan) S Togami	11	11	13	3

Final
5	(South Korea) Jang W-j (South Korea) Lim J-h	11	8	11	9	1
2	(Japan) Y Uda (Japan) S Togami	13	11	8	11	3
