= Table tennis at the 2018 Asian Games =

- Venue: Jakarta International Expo
- Dates: 26 August – 1 September 2018
- Competitors: 179 from 26 nations

At the 2018 Asian Games, table tennis was held in Jakarta International Expo Hall B, Jakarta, Indonesia, from 26 August to 1 September 2018.

China dominated the competition winning all possible gold and silver medals.

== Schedule ==
| P | Preliminary rounds | ¼ | Quarterfinals | ½ | Semifinals | F | Final |

| Event↓/Date → | 26th Sun | 27th Mon | | 28th Tue | | 29th Wed | | | 30th Thu | 31st Fri | | 1st Sat | |
|---|---|---|---|---|---|---|---|---|---|---|---|---|---|
| Men's singles | | | | | | | | | P | P | ¼ | ½ | F |
| Men's team | P | P | ¼ | ½ | F | | | | | | | | |
| Women's singles | | | | | | | | | P | P | ¼ | ½ | F |
| Women's team | P | P | ¼ | ½ | F | | | | | | | | |
| Mixed doubles | | | | | | P | ¼ | ½ | F | | | | |

== Medalists ==
| Event | Gold | Silver | Bronze |
|---|---|---|---|
| Men's singles | Fan Zhendong; China | Lin Gaoyuan; China | Noshad Alamian; Iran |
| Men's singles | Fan Zhendong; China | Lin Gaoyuan; China | Lee Sang-su; South Korea |
| Men's team | China; Fan Zhendong; Liang Jingkun; Lin Gaoyuan; Wang Chuqin; Xue Fei | South Korea; Jang Woo-jin; Jeoung Young-sik; Kim Dong-hyun; Lee Sang-su; Lim Jong-hoon | Chinese Taipei; Chen Chien-an; Chuang Chih-yuan; Lee Chia-sheng; Liao Cheng-ting; Lin Yun-ju |
| Men's team | China; Fan Zhendong; Liang Jingkun; Lin Gaoyuan; Wang Chuqin; Xue Fei | South Korea; Jang Woo-jin; Jeoung Young-sik; Kim Dong-hyun; Lee Sang-su; Lim Jong-hoon | India; Anthony Amalraj; Harmeet Desai; Sathiyan Gnanasekaran; Sharath Kamal; Manav Thakkar |
| Women's singles | Wang Manyu; China | Chen Meng; China | Jeon Ji-hee; South Korea |
| Women's singles | Wang Manyu; China | Chen Meng; China | Yu Mengyu; Singapore |
| Women's team | China; Chen Meng; Chen Xingtong; Sun Yingsha; Wang Manyu; Zhu Yuling | North Korea; Cha Hyo-sim; Choe Hyon-hwa; Kim Nam-hae; Kim Song-i; Pyon Song-gyong | South Korea; Choi Hyo-joo; Jeon Ji-hee; Kim Ji-ho; Suh Hyo-won; Yang Ha-eun |
| Women's team | China; Chen Meng; Chen Xingtong; Sun Yingsha; Wang Manyu; Zhu Yuling | North Korea; Cha Hyo-sim; Choe Hyon-hwa; Kim Nam-hae; Kim Song-i; Pyon Song-gyong | Hong Kong; Doo Hoi Kem; Lee Ho Ching; Li Ching Wan; Ng Wing Nam; Minnie Soo |
| Mixed doubles | China; Wang Chuqin; Sun Yingsha | China; Lin Gaoyuan; Wang Manyu | Hong Kong; Ho Kwan Kit; Lee Ho Ching |
| Mixed doubles | China; Wang Chuqin; Sun Yingsha | China; Lin Gaoyuan; Wang Manyu | India; Sharath Kamal; Manika Batra |

== Medal table ==
| Rank | Nation | Gold | Silver | Bronze | Total |
|---|---|---|---|---|---|
| 1 | China (CHN) | 5 | 3 | 0 | 8 |
| 2 | South Korea (KOR) | 0 | 1 | 3 | 4 |
| 3 | North Korea (PRK) | 0 | 1 | 0 | 1 |
| 4 | Hong Kong (HKG) | 0 | 0 | 2 | 2 |
| 4 | India (IND) | 0 | 0 | 2 | 2 |
| 6 | Chinese Taipei (TPE) | 0 | 0 | 1 | 1 |
| 6 | Iran (IRI) | 0 | 0 | 1 | 1 |
| 6 | Singapore (SGP) | 0 | 0 | 1 | 1 |
| Totals (8 entries) | | 5 | 5 | 10 | 20 |

== Participating nations ==
A total of 179 athletes from 26 nations competed in table tennis at the 2018 Asian Games:

- China (10)
- Chinese Taipei (10)
- Hong Kong (10)
- India (10)
- Indonesia (10)
- Iran (8)
- Japan (8)
- Kyrgyzstan (3)
- Laos (5)
- Lebanon (2)
- Macau (10)
- Malaysia (8)
- Maldives (4)
- Mongolia (8)
- Nepal (6)
- North Korea (10)
- Pakistan (4)
- Philippines (1)
- Qatar (7)
- Singapore (6)
- South Korea (10)
- Sri Lanka (2)
- Thailand (10)
- United Arab Emirates (3)
- Vietnam (9)
- Yemen (5)
