= Table tennis at the 2022 Commonwealth Games – Men's doubles =

Table tennis – Men's doubles at the 2022 Commonwealth Games
- Venue: National Exhibition Centre
- Dates: 4 - 7 August 2022

Medalists
gold medal	Paul Drinkhall; Liam Pitchford	England
silver medal	Sharath Kamal; Sathiyan Gnanasekaran	India
bronze medal	Poh Shao Feng Ethan; Clarence Chew	Singapore

Table tennis men's doubles at the 2022 Commonwealth Games will be held at the National Exhibition Centre at Birmingham, England from 4 to 7 August 2022.

== Finals ==
Semifinals
Liam Pitchford (ENG); Paul Drinkhall (ENG)	11	11	8	11
Poh Shao Feng Ethan (SGP); Clarence Chew (SGP)	2	4	11	9
Nicholas Lum (AUS); Finn Liu (AUS)	11	9	12	1	8
Sharath Kamal (IND); Sathiyan Gnanasekaran (IND)	8	11	10	11	11

Gold medal match
Liam Pitchford (ENG); Paul Drinkhall (ENG)	8	11	11	7	11
Sharath Kamal (IND); Sathiyan Gnanasekaran (IND)	11	8	3	11	4
Bronze medal match
Poh Shao Feng Ethan (SGP); Clarence Chew (SGP)	11	11	8	11
Nicholas Lum (AUS); Finn Liu (AUS)	4	8	11	5

== Top half ==
=== Section 1 ===
Round of 64

Round of 32
L Pitchford (ENG); P Drinkhall (ENG)	3	11	11	11
C Dalgleish (SCO); G Rumgay (SCO)	11	6	4	4
S Jones (RSA); K Steyn (RSA)	8	11	7	6
R Maxwell (BAR); T Knight (BAR)	11	4	11	11
S Britton (GUY); C Franklin (GUY)	11	8	11	11
M Baboolall (MRI); C Yook (MRI)	8	11	6	6
M Hamza (BAN); M R Sabbir (BAN)	4	4	8
A Omeh (NGR); O Omotayo (NGR)	11	11	11

Round of 16
L Pitchford (ENG); P Drinkhall (ENG)	11	11	11
R Maxwell (BAR); T Knight (BAR)	5	5	6
S Britton (GUY); C Franklin (GUY)	6	6	11	5
A Omeh (NGR); O Omotayo (NGR)	11	11	9	11

Quarterfinals
L Pitchford (ENG); P Drinkhall (ENG)	11	11	11
A Omeh (NGR); O Omotayo (NGR)	9	3	5

=== Section 2 ===
Round of 64

Round of 32
P S F Ethan (SGP); C Chew (SGP)	13	10	11	11
Lee Y Y (MAS); Leong C F (MAS)	11	12	3	8
O Cathcart (NIR); J Skelton (NIR)	7	5	2
Chen Ht (CAN); Eugene W (CAN)	11	11	11
D Chambers (AUS); C Yan (AUS)	11	11	11
Emmanuel Asante (GHA); E Commey (GHA)	4	6	9
C Savva (CYP); I Elia (CYP)	6	5	1
H Desai (IND); S Shetty (IND)	11	11	11

Round of 16
P S F Ethan (SGP); C Chew (SGP)	11	11	4	11
Chen Ht (CAN); Eugene W (CAN)	5	9	11	6
D Chambers (AUS); C Yan (AUS)	3	11	9	7
H Desai (IND); S Shetty (IND)	11	9	11	11

Quarterfinals
P S F Ethan (SGP); C Chew (SGP)	12	11	11
H Desai (IND); S Shetty (IND)	10	7	7

== Bottom half ==
=== Section 3 ===
Round of 64
J Choong (MAS); Wong Q S (MAS)	9	11	9	11	18
P McCreery (NIR); Z Wilson (NIR)	11	6	11	9	20

Round of 32
B Abiodun (NGR); Q Aruna (NGR)	11	13	11
M Yiangou (CYP); S Elia (CYP)	6	11	1
M Crea (SEY); G Sultan (SEY)	5	1	2
P Y E Koen (SGP); I Quek (SGP)	11	11	11
J Hazin (CAN); E Ly (CAN)	11	11	11
P McCreery (NIR); Z Wilson (NIR)	8	7	4
D Abreefa (GHA); E Commey (GHA)	10	11	4	6
N Lum (AUS); F Liu (AUS)	12	8	11	11

Round of 16
B Abiodun (NGR); Q Aruna (NGR)	11	11	7	7	11
P Y E Koen (SGP); I Quek (SGP)	8	9	11	11	8
J Hazin (CAN); E Ly (CAN)	11	6	7	6
N Lum (AUS); F Liu (AUS)	7	11	11	11

Quarterfinals
B Abiodun (NGR); Q Aruna (NGR)	12	8	11	11	8
N Lum (AUS); F Liu (AUS)	14	11	4	9	11

=== Section 4 ===
Round of 64

Round of 32
T Jarvis (ENG); S Walker (ENG)	11	11	11
K Farley (BAR); T Riley (BAR)	5	3	2
J Pontoise (MRI); A Yogarajah (MRI)	11	8	13	11	9
T Cogill (RSA); C O Nathoo (RSA)	5	11	15	8	11
R Bawm (BAN); M A Ridoy (BAN)	11	11	11
J Chauhan (FIJ); V Wu (FIJ)	6	1	7
J Chauhan (GUY); J v Lange (GUY)	2	5	6
S Kamal (IND); S Gnanasekaran (IND)	11	11	11

Round of 16
T Jarvis (ENG); S Walker (ENG)	11	11	11
T Cogill (RSA); C O Nathoo (RSA)	8	4	5
R Bawm (BAN); M A Ridoy (BAN)	6	1	4
S Kamal (IND); S Gnanasekaran (IND)	11	11	11

Quarterfinals
T Jarvis (ENG); S Walker (ENG)	6	8	4
S Kamal (IND); S Gnanasekaran (IND)	11	11	11
