= Table tennis at the 2018 Asian Games – Men's team =

Men's team at the 2018 Asian Games
- Venue: Jakarta International Expo
- Date: 26–28 August 2018
- Competitors: 88 from 20 nations

Medalists
| gold medal | China; Fan Zhendong, Liang Jingkun, Lin Gaoyuan, Wang Chuqin, Xue Fei |
| silver medal | South Korea; Jang Woo-jin, Jeoung Young-sik, Kim Dong-hyun, Lee Sang-su, Lim Jong-hoon |
| bronze medal | Chinese Taipei; Chen Chien-an, Chuang Chih-yuan, Lee Chia-sheng, Liao Cheng-ting, Lin Yun-ju |
| bronze medal | India; Anthony Amalraj, Harmeet Desai, Sathiyan Gnanasekaran, Sharath Kamal, Manav Thakkar |

The men's team table tennis event at the 2018 Asian Games took place from 26 to 28 August 2018 at the Jakarta International Expo. Team ranking was based on the ITTF world team ranking of August 2018.

== Schedule ==
All times are Western Indonesia Time (UTC+07:00)

| Date | Time | Event |
|---|---|---|
| Sunday, 26 August 2018 | 12:00 | Preliminary round 1 |
| Sunday, 26 August 2018 | 16:00 | Preliminary round 2 |
| Sunday, 26 August 2018 | 20:00 | Preliminary round 3 |
| Monday, 27 August 2018 | 12:00 | Preliminary round 4 |
| Monday, 27 August 2018 | 16:00 | Preliminary round 5 |
| Monday, 27 August 2018 | 20:00 | Quarterfinals |
| Tuesday, 28 August 2018 | 10:00 | Semifinals |
| Tuesday, 28 August 2018 | 19:00 | Final |

== Results ==
=== Preliminary round ===
==== Group A ====
| Pos | Team | Pld | W | L | MF | MA | Pts | Qualification |
|---|---|---|---|---|---|---|---|---|
| 1 | China | 4 | 4 | 0 | 12 | 0 | 8 | Quarterfinals |
| 2 | North Korea | 4 | 3 | 1 | 9 | 3 | 7 | Quarterfinals |
| 3 | Malaysia | 4 | 2 | 2 | 6 | 6 | 6 | |
| 4 | Nepal | 4 | 1 | 3 | 3 | 10 | 5 | |
| 5 | Laos | 4 | 0 | 4 | 1 | 12 | 4 | |

Source: ATTU

| 26 August | China | 3–0 | Nepal |

Fan Zhendong | 3–0 | Amar Lal Malla | 11–3, 11–4, 11–2
Lin Gaoyuan | 3–0 | Santoo Shrestha | 11–1, 11–5, 11–3
Wang Chuqin | 3–0 | Deep Saun | 11–6, 11–6, 11–4

| 26 August | Laos | 0–3 | Malaysia |

Sengarthid Vongdalasinh | 0–3 | Leong Chee Feng | 6–11, 5–11, 2–11
Sonpasith Mosangsinh | 0–3 | Ashraf Haiqal Rizal | 4–11, 5–11, 5–11
Duangtavane Sathathone | 0–3 | Choong Javen | 1–11, 10–12, 3–11

| 26 August | Malaysia | 0–3 | China |

Choong Javen | 0–3 | Lin Gaoyuan | 5–11, 2–11, 4–11
Ashraf Haiqal Rizal | 0–3 | Wang Chuqin | 6–11, 5–11, 3–11
Leong Chee Feng | 0–3 | Liang Jingkun | 3–11, 7–11, 5–11

| 26 August | North Korea | 3–0 | Laos |

An Ji-song | 3–0 | Sonpasith Mosangsinh | 11–4, 11–4, 11–7
Ham Yu-song | 3–0 | Sengarthid Vongdalasinh | 11–6, 11–7, 11–4
Pak Sin-hyok | 3–0 | Duangtavane Sathathone | 11–3, 11–3, 11–1

| 26 August | China | 3–0 | North Korea |

Fan Zhendong | 3–0 | An Ji-song | 11–4, 13–11, 11–4
Lin Gaoyuan | 3–0 | Ham Yu-song | 11–6, 11–8, 11–5
Wang Chuqin | 3–1 | Pak Sin-hyok | 11–8, 11–3, 8–11, 11–7

| 26 August | Malaysia | 3–0 | Nepal |

Leong Chee Feng | 3–1 | Santoo Shrestha | 11–3, 11–8, 9–11, 13–11
Ashraf Haiqal Rizal | 3–0 | Amar Lal Malla | 11–7, 13–11, 11–6
Chin Wen Jie | 3–1 | Deep Saun | 15–13, 11–3, 8–11, 11–7

| 27 August | China | 3–0 | Laos |

Liang Jingkun | 3–0 | Sengarthid Vongdalasinh | 11–4, 11–4, 11–3
Xue Fei | 3–0 | Sonpasith Mosangsinh | 11–4, 11–3, 11–1
Wang Chuqin | 3–0 | Duangtavane Sathathone | 11–3, 11–4, 11–4

| 27 August | Nepal | 0–3 | North Korea |

Santoo Shrestha | 0–3 | An Ji-song | 4–11, 6–11, 6–11
Amar Lal Malla | 0–3 | Ham Yu-song | 6–11, 9–11, 7–11
Deep Saun | 0–3 | Pak Sin-hyok | 3–11, 9–11, 10–12

| 27 August | Nepal | 3–1 | Laos |

Amar Lal Malla | 3–1 | Duangtavane Sathathone | 8–11, 11–7, 11–4, 11–7
Santoo Shrestha | 3–0 | Sonpasith Mosangsinh | 11–6, 11–3, 11–9
Deep Saun | 1–3 | Sengarthid Vongdalasinh | 8–11, 11–8, 9–11, 6–11
Amar Lal Malla | 3–2 | Sonpasith Mosangsinh | 9–11, 11–9, 11–6, 9–11, 11–3

| 27 August | Malaysia | 0–3 | North Korea |

Leong Chee Feng | 0–3 | Pak Sin-hyok | 6–11, 9–11, 7–11
Ashraf Haiqal Rizal | 1–3 | An Ji-song | 11–7, 10–12, 9–11, 7–11
Choong Javen | 2–3 | Ham Yu-song | 11–8, 4–11, 8–11, 11–4, 2–11

==== Group B ====
| Pos | Team | Pld | W | L | MF | MA | Pts | Qualification |
|---|---|---|---|---|---|---|---|---|
| 1 | Japan | 4 | 4 | 0 | 12 | 1 | 8 | Quarterfinals |
| 2 | Iran | 4 | 3 | 1 | 10 | 4 | 7 | Quarterfinals |
| 3 | Thailand | 4 | 2 | 2 | 7 | 6 | 6 | |
| 4 | Kyrgyzstan | 4 | 1 | 3 | 3 | 10 | 5 | |
| 5 | Maldives | 4 | 0 | 4 | 1 | 12 | 4 | |

Source: ATTU

| 26 August | Japan | 3–0 | Maldives |

Jin Ueda | 3–0 | Mohamed Zeesth Naseem | 11–6, 11–2, 11–2
Masaki Yoshida | 3–0 | Moosa Munsif Ahmed | 11–4, 11–9, 11–5
Masataka Morizono | 3–0 | Mohamed Shaffan Ismail | 11–6, 11–5, 11–6

| 26 August | Thailand | 3–0 | Kyrgyzstan |

Padasak Tanviriyavechakul | 3–0 | Talgat Sagyndykov | 11–3, 11–4, 11–6
Supanut Wisutmaythangkoon | 3–0 | Alisher Iakupbaev | 11–6, 11–5, 11–6
Pattaratorn Passara | 3–0 | Aziz Kydyrbaev | 11–1, 11–2, 11–4

| 26 August | Thailand | 0–3 | Japan |

Supanut Wisutmaythangkoon | 1–3 | Jin Ueda | 7–11, 11–9, 8–11, 5–11
Padasak Tanviriyavechakul | 0–3 | Kenta Matsudaira | 9–11, 8–11, 6–11
Pattaratorn Passara | 1–3 | Masaki Yoshida | 7–11, 5–11, 11–9, 7–11

| 26 August | Iran | 3–0 | Kyrgyzstan |

Afshin Norouzi | 3–0 | Aziz Kydyrbaev | 11–7, 11–4, 11–7
Nima Alamian | 3–0 | Alisher Iakupbaev | 11–3, 11–5, 11–2
Noshad Alamian | 3–0 | Talgat Sagyndykov | 11–8, 11–5, 11–7

| 26 August | Japan | 3–1 | Iran |

Kenta Matsudaira | 0–3 | Nima Alamian | 6–11, 9–11, 10–12
Jin Ueda | 3–1 | Noshad Alamian | 12–10, 6–11, 11–5, 12–10
Masataka Morizono | 3–1 | Afshin Norouzi | 11–4, 10–12, 11–5, 12–10
Kenta Matsudaira | 3–1 | Noshad Alamian | 6–11, 12–10, 11–9, 11–5

| 26 August | Thailand | 3–0 | Maldives |

Supanut Wisutmaythangkoon | 3–0 | Mohamed Zeesth Naseem | 11–6, 11–5, 11–4
Pattaratorn Passara | 3–2 | Moosa Munsif Ahmed | 11–5, 6–11, 11–3, 9–11, 11–2
Sirawit Puangthip | 3–0 | Mohamed Shaffan Ismail | 11–7, 11–4, 11–6

| 27 August | Kyrgyzstan | 0–3 | Japan |

Alisher Iakupbaev | 0–3 | Masataka Morizono | 7–11, 5–11, 4–11
Talgat Sagyndykov | 0–3 | Masaki Yoshida | 5–11, 3–11, 5–11
Aziz Kydyrbaev | 0–3 | Kenta Matsudaira | 3–11, 1–11, 8–11

| 27 August | Maldives | 0–3 | Iran |

Moosa Munsif Ahmed | 0–3 | Nima Alamian | 5–11, 3–11, 5–11
Mohamed Shaffan Ismail | 0–3 | Noshad Alamian | 5–11, 4–11, 7–11
Mohamed Zeesth Naseem | 0–3 | Afshin Norouzi | 5–11, 6–11, 5–11

| 27 August | Maldives | 1–3 | Kyrgyzstan |

Moosa Munsif Ahmed | 1–3 | Talgat Sagyndykov | 11–9, 8–11, 9–11, 5–11
Mohamed Zeesth Naseem | 0–3 | Alisher Iakupbaev | 8–11, 4–11, 7–11
Mohamed Shaffan Ismail | 3–2 | Aziz Kydyrbaev | 7–11, 11–9, 7–11, 11–3, 11–4
Moosa Munsif Ahmed | 0–3 | Alisher Iakupbaev | 9–11, 6–11, 9–11

| 27 August | Thailand | 1–3 | Iran |

Supanut Wisutmaythangkoon | 2–3 | Noshad Alamian | 11–8, 5–11, 11–9, 7–11, 5–11
Padasak Tanviriyavechakul | 0–3 | Nima Alamian | 8–11, 11–13, 5–11
Pattaratorn Passara | 3–2 | Afshin Norouzi | 6–11, 9–11, 11–5, 11–8, 12–10
Supanut Wisutmaythangkoon | 2–3 | Nima Alamian | 11–5, 7–11, 5–11, 11–9, 3–11

==== Group C ====
| Pos | Team | Pld | W | L | MF | MA | Pts | Qualification |
|---|---|---|---|---|---|---|---|---|
| 1 | South Korea | 4 | 4 | 0 | 12 | 2 | 8 | Quarterfinals |
| 2 | Hong Kong | 4 | 3 | 1 | 11 | 3 | 7 | Quarterfinals |
| 3 | Indonesia | 4 | 2 | 2 | 6 | 6 | 6 | |
| 4 | Mongolia | 4 | 1 | 3 | 3 | 9 | 5 | |
| 5 | Yemen | 4 | 0 | 4 | 0 | 12 | 4 | |

Source: ATTU

| 26 August | Mongolia | 0–3 | South Korea |

Batkhishigiin Bilegt | 0–3 | Jeoung Young-sik | 3–11, 3–11, 6–11
Chinbatyn Erdenebayar | 0–3 | Lee Sang-su | 6–11, 5–11, 6–11
Jargalsaikhany Mönkhzorig | 0–3 | Lim Jong-hoon | 9–11, 8–11, 4–11

| 26 August | Indonesia | 3–0 | Yemen |

Bima Abdi Negara | 3–1 | Omar Al-Kades | 11–4, 12–14, 14–12, 13–11
Ficky Supit Santoso | 3–0 | Muneer Al-Dhubhani | 11–7, 11–8, 11–3
Donny Prasetya Aji | 3–0 | Taha Al-Mahaqeri | 11–8, 11–9, 11–7

| 26 August | Indonesia | 0–3 | South Korea |

Ficky Supit Santoso | 1–3 | Lee Sang-su | 10–12, 8–11, 11–6, 2–11
Deepash Anil Bhagwani | 0–3 | Jang Woo-jin | 4–11, 4–11, 9–11
Bima Abdi Negara | 1–3 | Jeoung Young-sik | 12–14, 11–5, 6–11, 11–13

| 26 August | Hong Kong | 3–0 | Yemen |

Wong Chun Ting | 3–0 | Taha Al-Mahaqeri | 11–5, 11–7, 11–3
Ho Kwan Kit | 3–0 | Omar Al-Kades | 11–8, 11–8, 11–4
Ng Pak Nam | 3–1 | Fahad Gubran | 11–7, 11–2, 12–14, 11–6

| 26 August | Hong Kong | 2–3 | South Korea |

| Wong Chun Ting | 3–1 | Jeoung Young-sik | 11–9, 8–11, 11–5, 12–10 |
| Ho Kwan Kit | 0–3 | Lee Sang-su | 6–11, 6–11, 8–11 |
| Ng Pak Nam | 2–3 | Jang Woo-jin | 5–11, 7–11, 11–8, 11–8, 9–11 |
| Wong Chun Ting | 3–2 | Lee Sang-su | 13–11, 6–11, 11–9, 6–11, 11–8 |
| Ho Kwan Kit | 2–3 | Jeoung Young-sik | 9–11, 7–11, 11–9, 11–4, 5–11 |

| 26 August | Mongolia | 0–3 | Indonesia |

Chinbatyn Erdenebayar | 0–3 | Donny Prasetya Aji | 7–11, 7–11, 7–11
Batkhishigiin Bilegt | 0–3 | Ficky Supit Santoso | 8–11, 11–13, 3–11
Jargalsaikhany Mönkhzorig | 0–3 | Luki Purkani | 5–11, 2–11, 9–11

| 27 August | South Korea | 3–0 | Yemen |

Jang Woo-jin | 3–0 | Taha Al-Mahaqeri | 11–7, 11–3, 12–10
Lim Jong-hoon | 3–0 | Muneer Al-Dhubhani | 11–5, 11–8, 11–8
Kim Dong-hyun | 3–1 | Ebrahim Gubran | 13–11, 9–11, 11–6, 13–11

| 27 August | Hong Kong | 3–0 | Mongolia |

Lam Siu Hang | 3–0 | Batkhishigiin Bilegt | 11–4, 11–2, 11–9
Ng Pak Nam | 3–1 | Enkhbatyn Lkhagvasüren | 11–3, 11–7, 9–11, 11–8
Ho Kwan Kit | 3–0 | Myandalyn Temüülen | 11–2, 11–4, 11–2

| 27 August | Mongolia | 3–0 | Yemen |

Batkhishigiin Bilegt | 3–1 | Omar Al-Kades | 8–11, 12–10, 12–10, 11–4
Enkhbatyn Lkhagvasüren | 3–2 | Muneer Al-Dhubhani | 11–8, 14–12, 9–11, 6–11, 11–4
Chinbatyn Erdenebayar | 3–2 | Taha Al-Mahaqeri | 11–3, 8–11, 11–6, 6–11, 11–2

| 27 August | Indonesia | 0–3 | Hong Kong |

Ficky Supit Santoso | 0–3 | Ho Kwan Kit | 5–11, 8–11, 8–11
Bima Abdi Negara | 1–3 | Wong Chun Ting | 4–11, 11–9, 2–11, 4–11
Donny Prasetya Aji | 0–3 | Lam Siu Hang | 6–11, 3–11, 9–11

==== Group D ====
| Pos | Team | Pld | W | L | MF | MA | Pts | Qualification |
|---|---|---|---|---|---|---|---|---|
| 1 | Chinese Taipei | 4 | 4 | 0 | 12 | 2 | 8 | Quarterfinals |
| 2 | India | 4 | 3 | 1 | 11 | 3 | 7 | Quarterfinals |
| 3 | Vietnam | 4 | 2 | 2 | 6 | 6 | 6 | |
| 4 | Macau | 4 | 1 | 3 | 3 | 10 | 5 | |
| 5 | United Arab Emirates | 4 | 0 | 4 | 1 | 12 | 4 | |

Source: ATTU

| 26 August | Macau | 0–3 | Chinese Taipei |

Cheong Chi Cheng | 0–3 | Lin Yun-ju | 3–11, 6–11, 8–11
Cheong Chi Chon | 0–3 | Chuang Chih-yuan | 4–11, 4–11, 8–11
Xiao Zikang | 0–3 | Lee Chia-sheng | 5–11, 8–11, 6–11

| 26 August | Vietnam | 3–0 | United Arab Emirates |

Nguyễn Anh Tú | 3–0 | Salahaldin Al-Balooshi | 11–1, 11–3, 11–7
Nguyễn Đức Tuân | 3–1 | Abdulla Al-Balooshi | 11–3, 11–3, 9–11, 11–7
Lê Đình Đức | 3–0 | Essa Al-Balooshi | 11–5, 11–5, 11–2

| 26 August | Vietnam | 0–3 | Chinese Taipei |

Nguyễn Đức Tuân | 0–3 | Chuang Chih-yuan | 7–11, 9–11, 5–11
Nguyễn Anh Tú | 0–3 | Chen Chien-an | 5–11, 7–11, 5–11
Lê Tiến Đạt | 0–3 | Liao Cheng-ting | 7–11, 9–11, 8–11

| 26 August | India | 3–0 | United Arab Emirates |

Sathiyan Gnanasekaran | 3–0 | Salahaldin Al-Balooshi | 11–6, 11–3, 11–4
Sharath Kamal | 3–0 | Abdulla Al-Balooshi | 11–9, 11–6, 11–5
Harmeet Desai | 3–0 | Essa Al-Balooshi | 11–4, 11–2, 11–8

| 26 August | India | 2–3 | Chinese Taipei |

| Sharath Kamal | 3–1 | Lin Yun-ju | 11–8, 5–11, 12–10, 11–8 |
| Sathiyan Gnanasekaran | 0–3 | Chuang Chih-yuan | 10–12, 9–11, 9–11 |
| Harmeet Desai | 3–2 | Chen Chien-an | 11–7, 10–12, 11–7, 7–11, 13–11 |
| Sharath Kamal | 1–3 | Chuang Chih-yuan | 1–11, 8–11, 12–10, 1–11 |
| Sathiyan Gnanasekaran | 1–3 | Lin Yun-ju | 9–11, 11–4, 9–11, 9–11 |

| 26 August | Vietnam | 3–0 | Macau |

Nguyễn Anh Tú | 3–0 | Wang Chun | 11–8, 11–5, 11–3
Nguyễn Đức Tuân | 3–0 | Cheong Chi Cheng | 11–7, 11–7, 11–3
Lê Đình Đức | 3–1 | Cheong Chi Chon | 11–4, 10–12, 11–4, 11–6

| 27 August | Chinese Taipei | 3–0 | United Arab Emirates |

Chen Chien-an | 3–0 | Salahaldin Al-Balooshi | 11–8, 11–1, 11–1
Liao Cheng-ting | 3–0 | Abdulla Al-Balooshi | 11–1, 11–7, 11–6
Lee Chia-sheng | 3–0 | Essa Al-Balooshi | 11–3, 11–3, 11–4

| 27 August | Macau | 0–3 | India |

Wang Chun | 0–3 | Anthony Amalraj | 7–11, 3–11, 4–11
Xiao Zikang | 1–3 | Harmeet Desai | 4–11, 8–11, 11–8, 3–11
Mak Tin Ian | 0–3 | Manav Thakkar | 5–11, 4–11, 4–11

| 27 August | United Arab Emirates | 1–3 | Macau |

Salahaldin Al-Balooshi | 0–3 | Xiao Zikang | 5–11, 9–11, 8–11
Essa Al-Balooshi | 0–3 | Cheong Chi Cheng | 4–11, 11–13, 10–12
Abdulla Al-Balooshi | 3–2 | Mak Tin Ian | 11–7, 10–12, 11–8, 6–11, 11–6
Salahaldin Al-Balooshi | 0–3 | Cheong Chi Cheng | 6–11, 4–11, 9–11

| 27 August | Vietnam | 0–3 | India |

Nguyễn Anh Tú | 2–3 | Sathiyan Gnanasekaran | 11–6, 2–11, 11–5, 4–11, 2–11
Nguyễn Đức Tuân | 0–3 | Sharath Kamal | 7–11, 7–11, 5–11
Lê Đình Đức | 1–3 | Harmeet Desai | 11–2, 10–12, 9–11, 8–11

=== Knockout round ===
Quarterfinals
A1 | China | 3
Hong Kong | 0
Iran | 0
D1 | Chinese Taipei | 3
C1 | South Korea | 3
North Korea | 2
India | 3
B1 | Japan | 1

Semifinals
A1 | China | 3
D1 | Chinese Taipei | 1
C1 | South Korea | 3
India | 0

Final
A1 | China | 3
C1 | South Korea | 0

==== Quarterfinals ====
| 27 August | China | 3–0 | Hong Kong |

Fan Zhendong | 3–0 | Ho Kwan Kit | 11–5, 11–1, 11–8
Lin Gaoyuan | 3–0 | Wong Chun Ting | 11–9, 11–4, 11–9
Liang Jingkun | 3–0 | Lam Siu Hang | 11–7, 11–2, 11–9

| 27 August | Iran | 0–3 | Chinese Taipei |

Noshad Alamian | 0–3 | Chen Chien-an | 8–11, 3–11, 6–11
Nima Alamian | 1–3 | Chuang Chih-yuan | 7–11, 11–7, 8–11, 6–11
Amin Ahmadian | 0–3 | Lin Yun-ju | 8–11, 9–11, 7–11

| 27 August | South Korea | 3–2 | North Korea |

| Lee Sang-su | 2–3 | An Ji-song | 8–11, 9–11, 11–4, 11–7, 9–11 |
| Jeoung Young-sik | 3–0 | Pak Sin-hyok | 11–7, 14–12, 11–7 |
| Jang Woo-jin | 3–0 | Ham Yu-song | 11–4, 11–7, 11–7 |
| Lee Sang-su | 1–3 | Pak Sin-hyok | 6–11, 7–11, 11–6, 11–13 |
| Jeoung Young-sik | 3–1 | An Ji-song | 8–11, 11–4, 11–6, 11–6 |

| 27 August | India | 3–1 | Japan |

Sathiyan Gnanasekaran | 3–0 | Jin Ueda | 11–9, 11–9, 11–7
Sharath Kamal | 3–0 | Kenta Matsudaira | 11–8, 12–10, 11–8
Harmeet Desai | 2–3 | Masaki Yoshida | 11–9, 12–14, 11–8, 8–11, 4–11
Sathiyan Gnanasekaran | 3–1 | Kenta Matsudaira | 12–10, 6–11, 11–7, 11–4

==== Semifinals ====
| 28 August | Chinese Taipei | 1–3 | China |

Chuang Chih-yuan | 0–3 | Lin Gaoyuan | 6–11, 8–11, 3–11
Chen Chien-an | 0–3 | Fan Zhendong | 9–11, 8–11, 10–12
Lin Yun-ju | 3–1 | Wang Chuqin | 11–9, 14–12, 3–11, 11–9
Chuang Chih-yuan | 0–3 | Fan Zhendong | 4–11, 10–12, 4–11

| 28 August | South Korea | 3–0 | India |

Lee Sang-su | 3–1 | Sathiyan Gnanasekaran | 9–11, 11–9, 11–3, 11–3
Jeoung Young-sik | 3–2 | Sharath Kamal | 11–9, 11–9, 6–11, 7–11, 11–8
Jang Woo-jin | 3–1 | Anthony Amalraj | 11–5, 11–7, 4–11, 11–7

==== Final ====
| 28 August | South Korea | 0–3 | China |

Lee Sang-su | 0–3 | Lin Gaoyuan | 3–11, 3–11, 2–11
Jeoung Young-sik | 1–3 | Fan Zhendong | 12–10, 8–11, 8–11, 7–11
Jang Woo-jin | 1–3 | Wang Chuqin | 11–13, 11–7, 9–11, 6–11

== Non-participating athletes ==
- Jiang Tianyi (HKG)
- Mohamed Thabin Sujau (MDV)
- Choe Il (PRK)
- Ri Kwang-myong (PRK)
- Komgrit Sangpao (THA)
- Đinh Quang Linh (VIE)
