= Tom Jarvis =

English table tennis player

Personal information
- Nationality: British (English)
- Born: 2 December 1999 (age 26) Skegness, England

Sport
- Sport: Table tennis
- Highest ranking: 41 (11 May 2026)
- Current ranking: 43 (5 October 2026)
Medal record
Men's table tennis
Representing England
World Cup
Bronze medal – third place	2018 London	Men’s team
Commonwealth Games
Bronze medal – third place	2022 Birmingham	Men's team

Tom Jarvis (born 2 December 1999) is an English international table tennis player. He is a national champion and has represented England at the Commonwealth Games. At the 2025 World Table Tennis Championships in Doha he reached the final round of 16 in the men’s singles competition marking his then highest score at #78 in the ITTF world ranking.

== Biography ==
Jarvis started playing aged 5 before moving to Sweden at age 16. He was a reserve at the 2016 Summer Olympics. He became the national champion in the men's singles and men's doubles at the English National Table Tennis Championships.

In 2022, he was selected for the 2022 Commonwealth Games in Birmingham where he competed in three events; the men's doubles, the mixed doubles and the men's team events.
