= Table tennis at the 2022 Commonwealth Games – Men's team =

Table tennis – Men's team at the 2022 Commonwealth Games
- Venue: National Exhibition Centre
- Dates: 29 July – 2 August 2022

Medalists
gold medal	Harmeet Desai; Sathiyan Gnanasekaran; Sharath Kamal; Sanil Shetty	India
silver medal	Clarence Chew; Poh Shao Feng Ethan; Pang Yew En Koen; Izaac Quek	Singapore
bronze medal	Paul Drinkhall; Tom Jarvis; Liam Pitchford; Sam Walker	England

Men's team table tennis at the 2022 Commonwealth Games was held at the National Exhibition Centre in Birmingham, England from 29 July to 2 August.

== Group stage ==
- 2 points were awarded for a winning tie, and 1 point for a losing it.

=== Group 1 ===
Qualified for knockout stage

Team	Pld	TW	TL	MW	ML	GW	GL	PW	PL	Pts
England	3	3	0	9	0	27	0	297	92	6
Bangladesh	3	2	1	6	5	19	20	318	355	5
Guyana	3	1	2	5	6	20	21	358	355	4
Fiji	3	0	3	0	9	0	27	138	312	3

29 July 2022; 12:00	England	3–0	Guyana	National Exhibition Centre, Birmingham

report	Individual matches
Tom Jarvis / Paul Drinkhall	3–0	Christopher Franklin / Joel Alleyne	11–5, 11–2, 11–6
Liam Pitchford	3–0	Shemar Britton	11–4, 11–3, 11–5
Paul Drinkhall	3–0	Joel Alleyne	11–3, 11–7, 11–4

29 July 2022; 12:00	Fiji	0–3	Bangladesh	National Exhibition Centre, Birmingham

report	Individual matches
Jai Chauhan / Stephen Reilly	0–3	Ramhimlian Bawm / Mohutasin Ahmed Ridoy	7–11, 5–11, 4–11
Vicky Wu	0–3	Md Riffat Sabbir	8–11, 11–13, 6–11
Stephen Reilly	0–3	Mohutasin Ahmed Ridoy	1–11, 3–11, 6–11

29 July 2022; 18:30	England	3–0	Fiji	National Exhibition Centre, Birmingham

report	Individual matches
Sam Walker / Tom Jarvis	3–0	Stephen Reilly / Vicky Wu	11–0, 11–3, 11–3
Liam Pitchford	3–0	Jai Chauhan	11–2, 11–0, 11–2
Tom Jarvis	3–0	Vicky Wu	11–3, 11–1, 11–1

29 July 2022; 18:30	Guyana	2–3	Bangladesh	National Exhibition Centre, Birmingham

report	Individual matches
Christopher Franklin / Jonathan van Lange	2–3	Ramhimlian Bawm / Mohutasin Ahmed Ridoy	11–6, 9–11, 9–11, 11–3, 10–12
Shemar Britton	3–1	Md Riffat Sabbir	11–5, 8–11, 11–7, 11–7
Jonathan van Lange	1–3	Mohutasin Ahmed Ridoy	11–6, 8–11, 8–11, 4–11
Shemar Britton	3–0	Ramhimlian Bawm	11–5, 13–11, 12–10
Christopher Franklin	2–3	Md Rifat Sabbir	11–6, 11–6, 7–11, 11–13, 7–11

30 July 2022; 12:00	England	3–0	Bangladesh	National Exhibition Centre, Birmingham

report	Individual matches
Sam Walker / Paul Drinkhall	3–0	Md Riffat Sabbir / Mufradul Hamza	11–1, 11–5, 11–6
Liam Pitchford	3–0	Mohutasin Ahmed Ridoy	11–3, 11–8, 11–3
Paul Drinkhall	3–0	Mufradul Hamza	11–2, 11–1, 11–8

30 July 2022; 12:00	Fiji	0–3	Guyana	National Exhibition Centre, Birmingham

report	Individual matches
Stephen Reilly / Jai Chauhan	0–3	Christopher Franklin / Shemar Britton	8–11, 9–11, 1–11
Vicky Wu	2–3	Joel Alleyne	8–11, 11–8, 3–11, 11–7, 6–11
Stephen Reilly	0–3	Shemar Britton	4–11, 7–11, 6–11

=== Group 2 ===
Qualified for knockout stage

Team	Pld	TW	TL	MW	ML	GW	GL	PW	PL	Pts
Nigeria	3	3	0	9	0	27	2	314	173	6
Cyprus	3	2	1	6	5	21	19	342	364	5
Ghana	3	1	2	4	7	5	18	316	346	4
South Africa	3	0	3	2	9	8	30	300	391	3

29 July 2022; 12:00	Nigeria	3–0	South Africa	National Exhibition Centre, Birmingham

	Individual matches
Amadi Omeh / Olajide Omotayo	3–0	Theo Cogill / Chetan Ooka Nathoo	11–5, 11–5, 11–5
Quadri Aruna	3–0	Shaun Jones	11–6, 11–3, 12–10
Olajide Omotayo	3–0	Chetan Ooka Nathoo	11–9, 11–6, 11–6

29 July 2022; 12:00	Ghana	1–3	Cyprus	National Exhibition Centre, Birmingham

	Individual matches
Emmanuel Commey / Derek Abrefa	3–0	Christos Savva / Sharpel Elia	11–5, 11–8, 11–5
Emmanuel Asante	0–3	Marios Yiangou	7–11, 2–11, 6–11
Derek Abrefa	2–3	Sharpel Elia	8–11, 11–4, 11–6, 11–13, 10–12
Emmanuel Commey	0–3	Marios Yiangou	4–11, 10–12, 6–11

29 July 2022; 18:30	Nigeria	3–0	Ghana	National Exhibition Centre, Birmingham

	Individual matches
Amadi Omeh / Olajide Omotayo	3–0	Emmanuel Commey / Derek Abrefa	11–7, 11–3, 11–9
Quadri Aruna	3–0	Emmanuel Asante	11–3, 11–3, 11–6
Olajide Omotayo	3–0	Derek Abrefa	11–8, 11–7, 11–8

29 July 2022; 18:30	South Africa	1–3	Cyprus	National Exhibition Centre, Birmingham

	Individual matches
Theo Cogill / Chetan Ooka Nathoo	2–3	Christos Savva / Sharpel Elia	11–8, 11–4, 9–11, 15–17, 5–11
Shaun Jones	0–3	Marios Yiangou	9–11, 6–11, 3–11
Theo Cogill	3–1	Sharpel Elia	14–12, 11–1, 4–11, 11–6
Chetan Ooka Nathoo	0–3	Marios Yiangou	8–11, 5–11, 7–11

30 July 2022; 12:00	Nigeria	3–0	Cyprus	National Exhibition Centre, Birmingham

report	Individual matches
Bode Abiodun / Olajide Omotayo	3–0	Christos Savva / Sharpel Elia	11–4, 11–4, 11–5
Quadri Aruna	3–2	Marios Yiangou	11–13, 11–5, 11–7, 6–11, 11–8
Olajide Omotayo	3–0	Christos Savva	11–2, 11–2, 11–3

30 July 2022; 12:00	Ghana	3–1	South Africa	National Exhibition Centre, Birmingham

report	Individual matches
Emmanuel Commey / Derek Abrefa	3–0	Kirshwan Steyn / Shaun Jones	11–6, 11–8, 11–8
Emmanuel Asante	2–3	Chetan Ooka Nathoo	13–11, 11–4, 5–11, 5–11, 8–11
Derek Abrefa	3–0	Shaun Jones	11–8, 12–10, 11–2
Emmanuel Commey	3–0	Chetan Ooka Nathoo	11–9, 14–12, 11–5

=== Group 3 ===
Qualified for knockout stage

Team	Pld	TW	TL	MW	ML	GW	GL	PW	PL	Pts
India	3	3	0	9	0	27	4	336	203	6
Singapore	3	2	1	6	3	19	10	272	218	5
Northern Ireland	3	1	2	3	6	12	20	264	303	4
Barbados	3	0	3	0	9	3	27	172	320	3

29 July 2022; 12:00	India	3–0	Barbados	National Exhibition Centre, Birmingham

report	Individual matches
Harmeet Desai / Sathiyan Gnanasekaran	3–0	Kevin Farley / Tyrese Knight	11–9, 11–9, 11–4
Sharath Kamal	3–0	Ramon Maxwell	11–5, 11–3, 11–3
Sathiyan Gnanasekaran	3–0	Tyrese Knight	11–4, 11–4, 11–5

29 July 2022; 12:00	Singapore	3–0	Northern Ireland	National Exhibition Centre, Birmingham

report	Individual matches
Poh Shao Feng Ethan / Clarence Chew	3–0	Zak Wilson / Paul McCreery	11–8, 11–7, 11–6
Pang Yew En Koen	3–0	Owen Cathcart	11–7, 11–8, 11–9
Clarence Chew	3–0	Paul McCreery	11–5, 11–6, 11–3

29 July 2022; 18:30	India	3–0	Singapore	National Exhibition Centre, Birmingham

report	Individual matches
Harmeet Desai / Sathiyan Gnanasekaran	3–1	Poh Shao Feng Ethan / Clarence Chew	11–5, 11–5, 9–11, 11–2
Sharath Kamal	3–0	Pang Yew En Koen	11–8, 11–9, 11–9
Sathiyan Gnanasekaran	3–0	Clarence Chew	11–7, 11–5, 11–8

29 July 2022; 18:30	Barbados	0–3	Northern Ireland	National Exhibition Centre, Birmingham

report	Individual matches
Kevin Farley / Tyrese Knight	1–3	Zak Wilson / Paul McCreery	5–11, 4–11, 13–11, 3–11
Ramon Maxwell	0–3	Owen Cathcart	6–11, 4–11, 6–11
Tyrese Knight	1–3	Paul McCreery	8–11, 8–11, 11–7, 7–11

30 July 2022; 12:00	India	3–0	Northern Ireland	National Exhibition Centre, Birmingham

report	Individual matches
Sharath Kamal / Harmeet Desai	3–1	James Skelton / Owen Cathcart	11–3, 9–11, 11–6, 11–1
Sanil Shetty	3–0	Paul McCreery	11–5, 15–13, 11–6
Harmeet Desai	3–2	Owen Cathcart	5–11, 11–9, 12–14, 11–3, 11–6

30 July 2022; 12:00	Singapore	3–0	Barbados	National Exhibition Centre, Birmingham

report	Individual matches
Pang Yew En Koen / Izaac Quek	3–0	Ramon Maxwell / Tre Riley	11–4, 11–2, 11–5
Poh Shao Feng Ethan	3–1	Tyrese Knight	5–11, 11–6, 11–4, 11–6
Izaac Quek	3–0	Tre Riley	11–6, 11–4, 11–3

=== Group 4 ===
Qualified for knockout stage

Team	Pld	TW	TL	MW	ML	GW	GL	PW	PL	Pts
Canada	3	2	1	8	4	29	15	436	379	5
Malaysia	3	2	1	7	4	24	17	398	362	5
Australia	3	2	1	7	5	27	21	456	421	5
Mauritius	3	0	3	0	9	0	27	164	297	3

29 July 2022; 12:00	Australia	1–3	Malaysia	National Exhibition Centre, Birmingham

	Individual matches
Finn Liu / Nicholas Lum	2–3	Wong Qi Shen / Javen Choong	9–11, 5–11, 11–7, 11–9, 8–11
Xin Yan	2–3	Leong Chee Feng	11–9, 9–11, 6–11, 11–9, 3–11
Nicholas Lum	3–2	Javen Choong	11–5, 13–11, 11–13, 9–11, 11–6
Finn Liu	0–3	Leong Chee Feng	6–11, 4–11, 8–11

29 July 2022; 12:00	Canada	3–0	Mauritius	National Exhibition Centre, Birmingham

	Individual matches
HongTao Chen / Edward Ly	3–0	Muhammad Baboolall / Jason Pontoise	11–6, 11–8, 11–5
Jeremy Hazin	3–0	Akhilen Yogarajah	11–9, 11–8, 11–7
Edward Ly	3–0	Jason Pontoise	11–3, 11–7, 5–11, 11–6

29 July 2022; 18:30	Australia	3–2	Canada	National Exhibition Centre, Birmingham

	Individual matches
Finn Liu / Nicholas Lum	2–3	Jeremy Hazin / Edward Ly	11–6, 8–11, 10–12, 11–3, 9–11
Dillon Chambers	3–1	Eugene Wang	7–11, 12–10, 11–7, 11–6
Nicholas Lum	0–3	Edward Ly	5–11, 9–11, 5–11
Finn Liu	3–2	Eugene Wang	6–11, 6–11, 12–10, 13–11, 11–9
Dillon Chambers	3–1	Jeremy Hazin	11–6, 11–8, 10–12, 11–8

29 July 2022; 18:30	Malaysia	3–0	Mauritius	National Exhibition Centre, Birmingham

	Individual matches
Wong Qi Shen / Javen Choong	3–0	Jason Pontoise / Akhilen Yogarajah	11–9, 11–7, 11–8
Leong Chee Feng	3–0	Muhammad Baboolall	11–3, 11–4, 11–9
Javen Choong	3–0	Akhilen Yogarajah	11–7, 11–7, 11–5

30 July 2022; 12:00	Australia	3–0	Mauritius	National Exhibition Centre, Birmingham

report	Individual matches
Finn Liu / Nicholas Lum	3–0	Jason Pontoise / Akhilen Yogarajah	11–6, 11–6, 11–6
Dillon Chambers	3–0	Muhammad Baboolall	11–1, 11–3, 11–4
Nicholas Lum	3–0	Akhilen Yogarajah	11–9, 11–3, 11–8

30 July 2022; 12:00	Canada	3–1	Malaysia	National Exhibition Centre, Birmingham

report	Individual matches
Jeremy Hazin / Edward Ly	1–3	Wong Qi Shen / Javen Choong	11–9, 10–12, 5–11, 8–11
HongTao Chen	3–0	Leong Chee Feng	11–8, 12–10, 11–8
Edward Ly	3–1	Javen Choong	11–6, 7–11, 11–5, 11–6
Jeremy Hazin	3–0	Leong Chee Feng	11–9, 11–5, 11–9

== Knockout stage ==
=== Bracket ===
Quarterfinals
31 July
England	3
Cyprus	0
31 July
Singapore	3
Canada	0
31 July
India	3
Bangladesh	0
31 July
Malaysia	2
Nigeria	3

Semifinals
1 August
England	2
Singapore	3
1 August
India	3
Nigeria	0

Final
2 August
Singapore	1
India	3
Bronze medal
2 August
England	3
Nigeria	0

=== Quarterfinals ===
31 July 2022; 12:00	England	3–0	Cyprus	National Exhibition Centre, Birmingham

report	Individual matches
Tom Jarvis / Paul Drinkhall	3–0	Christos Savva / Sharpel Elia	12―10, 11―3, 11―2
Liam Pitchford	3–0	Marios Yiangou	11―5, 11―3, 11―6
Paul Drinkhall	3–0	Sharpel Elia	11―6, 11―8, 11―4

31 July 2022; 9:30	Singapore	3–0	Canada	National Exhibition Centre, Birmingham

report	Individual matches
Pang Yew En Koen / Izaac Quek	3–0	Jeremy Hazin / Edward Ly	11―7, 11―6, 11―4
Clarence Chew	3–2	Eugene Wang	7―11, 11―5, 9―11, 13―11, 13―11
Pang Yew En Koen	3–2	Edward Ly	11―13, 7―11, 11―5, 11―6, 11―6

31 July 2022; 12:00	India	3–0	Bangladesh	National Exhibition Centre, Birmingham

report	Individual matches
Harmeet Desai / Sathiyan Gnanasekaran	3–0	Ramhimlian Bawm / Mohutasin Ahmed Ridoy	11―8, 11―6, 11―2
Sharath Kamal	3–0	Md Riffat Sabbir	11―4, 11―7, 11―2
Sathiyan Gnanasekaran	3–0	Mohutasin Ahmed Ridoy	11―2, 11―3, 11―5

31 July 2022; 9:30	Malaysia	2–3	Nigeria	National Exhibition Centre, Birmingham

report	Individual matches
Javen Choong / Wong Qi Shen	3–1	Olajide Omotayo / Bode Abiodun	6―11, 12―10, 12―10, 11―7
Leong Chee Feng	1–3	Quadri Aruna	9―11, 11―6, 5―11, 5―11
Wong Qi Shen	3–0	Bode Abiodun	12―10, 14―12, 11―5
Leong Chee Feng	1–3	Olajide Omotayo	8―11, 11―9, 7―11, 6―11
Javen Choong	1–3	Quadri Aruna	11―7, 8―11, 5―11, 9―11

=== Semifinals ===
1 August 2022; 18:30	England	2–3	Singapore	National Exhibition Centre, Birmingham

report	Individual matches
Sam Walker / Liam Pitchford	0–3	Izaac Quek / Pang Yew En Koen	9–11, 7–11, 7–11
Paul Drinkhall	3–1	Clarence Chew	11–8, 9–11, 11–4, 12–10
Liam Pitchford	1–3	Pang Yew En Koen	7–11, 11–9, 8–11, 9–11
Paul Drinkhall	3–0	Izaac Quek	11–7, 11–5, 11–4
Sam Walker	1–3	Clarence Chew	6–11, 5–11, 11–7, 7–11

1 August 2022; 18:30	India	3–0	Nigeria	National Exhibition Centre, Birmingham

report	Individual matches
Harmeet Desai / Sathiyan Gnanasekaran	3–0	Bode Abiodun / Olajide Omotayo	11–6, 11–7, 11–7
Sharath Kamal	3–1	Quadri Aruna	11–9, 7–11, 11–8, 15–13
Sathiyan Gnanasekaran	3–1	Olajide Omotayo	11–9, 4–11, 11–6, 11–8

=== Bronze medal ===
2 August 2022; 11:00	England (bronze)	3–0	Nigeria	National Exhibition Centre, Birmingham

report	Individual matches
Tom Jarvis / Paul Drinkhall	3–0	Olajide Omotayo / Bode Abiodun	11-6, 11-7, 11-7
Liam Pitchford	3–1	Quadri Aruna	11-9, 9-11, 12-10, 11-6
Paul Drinkhall	3–0	Olajide Omotayo	11-4, 11-2, 11-4

=== Final ===
2 August 2022; 13:30	India (gold)	3–1	Singapore (silver)	National Exhibition Centre, Birmingham

report	Individual matches
Harmeet Desai / Sathiyan Gnanasekaran	3–0	Izaac Quek / Pang Yew En Koen	13-11, 11-7, 11-5
Sharath Kamal	1–3	Clarence Chew	7-11, 14-12, 3-11, 9-11
Sathiyan Gnanasekaran	3–1	Pang Yew En Koen	12-10, 7-11, 11-7, 11-4
Harmeet Desai	3–0	Clarence Chew	11-8, 11-5, 11-6
