= Manav Thakkar =

Indian table tennis player

Personal information
- Full name: Manav Vikash Thakkar
- Nationality: Indian
- Born: 14 April 2000 (age 26) Rajkot, Gujarat, India
- Height: 177 cm (5 ft 10 in)
- Weight: 53.5 kg (118 lb)

Sport
- Sport: Table tennis
- Playing style: Right-handed shakehand grip
- Highest ranking: 33 (2 Feb 2026)
- Current ranking: 43 (MS); 3 (MD, with Manush Shah); 140 (XD, with Manika Batra) (28 September 2026)
Medal record
Men's Table Tennis
Representing India
Asian Games
Bronze medal – third place	2018 Jakarta	Men's Team
Asian Championships
Bronze medal – third place	2021 Doha	Men's team
Bronze medal – third place	2021 Doha	Men's doubles
Bronze medal – third place	2023 Pyeongchang	Men's team
Bronze medal – third place	2024 Astana	Men's team

Manav Thakkar is an Indian table tennis player, who is one of the highest ranked Indian men's singles players in the sport, his highest ranking was at 33 in the world as of 2 February 2026. He was part of the Indian team at the 2018 Asian Games, where he won a bronze medal in the men's team event. Thakkar was born in Rajkot, Gujarat. As of May 2020, he held the number one position in the ITTF World Under-21 men's singles rankings.
