= An Jae-hyun =

South Korean table tennis player (born 1999)

Personal information
- Born: 25 December 1999 (age 26) Daejeon, South Korea
- Height: 167 cm (5 ft 6 in)
- Weight: 60 kg (132 lb)

Sport
- Sport: Table tennis
- Playing style: Right-handed shakehand hold
- Equipment: XIOM An Jaehyun TMXi Pro (blade), DHS Hurricane III (FH, black), XIOM Omega VII (BH, red)
- Highest ranking: 16 (15 July 2025)
- Current ranking: 36 (2 November 2026)
Medal record
Men's table tennis
Representing South Korea
World Championships
Bronze medal – third place	2019 Budapest	Singles
Bronze medal – third place	2022 Chengdu	Team
Bronze medal – third place	2024 Busan	Team
World Cup
Silver medal – second place	2023 Chengdu	Mixed team
Silver medal – second place	2024 Chengdu	Mixed team
Asian Games
Silver medal – second place	2022 Hangzhou	Team
Bronze medal – third place	2026 Aichi-Nagoya	Team
Asian Championships
Gold medal – first place	2021 Doha	Team
Gold medal – first place	2024 Astana	Doubles
Silver medal – second place	2019 Yogyakarta	Team
Bronze medal – third place	2023 Pyeongchang	Doubles
Bronze medal – third place	2023 Pyeongchang	Team
Bronze medal – third place	2024 Astana	Team

An Jae-hyun (Korean: 안재현; Hanja: 安宰賢; born 25 December 1999) is a South Korean table tennis player.

== Career ==
He won a bronze medal at the 2019 World Table Tennis Championships.

=== 2021 ===
An Jaehyun failed to qualify for the 2021 Tokyo Olympics despite tying for the best overall record at the Korean Olympic trials and going undefeated against top seed Jeoung Young-sik and second seed and eventual trial winner Lee Sang-su.

An Jae-hyun lost in the round of 16 to Hugo Calderano at the WTT Contender event in World Table Tennis' inaugural event WTT Doha. Despite only being ranked 39, An was able to avenge his World Championship semi-final loss to world ranked #8 Mattias Falck with a 3–0 win in the round of 32.

=== 2026 Major League Table Tennis ===
Jae-hyun was selected by The New York Slice in the 2026 Major League Table Tennis draft
