= 2024 Asian Table Tennis Championships =

- Date: 7–13 October 2024
- Edition: 27th
- Location: Astana, Kazakhstan
- Venue: Daulet Sport Complex
- Asian Table Tennis Championships

The 2024 Asian Table Tennis Championships was a table tennis tournament held in Astana, Kazakhstan, from 7 to 13 October 2024.

In the team events, the Chinese men's team successfully defended their title, while the Japanese women's team defeated China to win the gold medal. North Korea's Kim Kum Yong claimed the women's singles title, and the men's singles crown went to Japan's Tomokazu Harimoto.

== Medalists ==
Event	Gold	Silver	Bronze
Men's singles	(Japan) Tomokazu Harimoto	(China) Lin Shidong	(South Korea) Oh Jun-sung
Men's singles	(Japan) Tomokazu Harimoto	(China) Lin Shidong	(Japan) Hiroto Shinozuka
Women's singles	(North Korea) Kim Kum Yong	(Japan) Miwa Harimoto	(Japan) Mima Ito
Women's singles	(North Korea) Kim Kum Yong	(Japan) Miwa Harimoto	(Hong Kong) Doo Hoi Kem
Men's doubles	(South Korea) Lim Jong-hoon (South Korea) An Jae-hyun	(Singapore) Koen Pang (Singapore) Izaac Quek	(Malaysia) Choong Javen (Malaysia) Wong Qi Shen
Men's doubles	(South Korea) Lim Jong-hoon (South Korea) An Jae-hyun	(Singapore) Koen Pang (Singapore) Izaac Quek	(Japan) Shunsuke Togami (Japan) Hiroto Shinozuka
Women's doubles	(Japan) Satsuki Odo (Japan) Sakura Yokoi	(Japan) Miwa Harimoto (Japan) Miyuu Kihara	(China) Chen Xingtong (China) Kuai Man
Women's doubles	(Japan) Satsuki Odo (Japan) Sakura Yokoi	(Japan) Miwa Harimoto (Japan) Miyuu Kihara	(India) Ayhika Mukherjee (India) Sutirtha Mukherjee
Mixed doubles	(China) Lin Shidong (China) Kuai Man	(North Korea) Ri Jong Sik (North Korea) Kim Kum Yong	(South Korea) Lim Jong-hoon (South Korea) Shin Yu-bin
Mixed doubles	(China) Lin Shidong (China) Kuai Man	(North Korea) Ri Jong Sik (North Korea) Kim Kum Yong	(North Korea) Ham Yu Song (North Korea) Pyon Song Gyong
Men's team	China; Wang Chuqin; Liang Jingkun; Lin Shidong; Lin Gaoyuan; Zhou Qihao	Chinese Taipei; Lin Yun-ju; Kao Cheng-jui; Feng Yi-hsin; Huang Yan-cheng; Liao Cheng-ting	India; Sharath Kamal; Manav Thakkar; Sathiyan Gnanasekaran; Harmeet Desai; Manush Shah
Men's team	China; Wang Chuqin; Liang Jingkun; Lin Shidong; Lin Gaoyuan; Zhou Qihao	Chinese Taipei; Lin Yun-ju; Kao Cheng-jui; Feng Yi-hsin; Huang Yan-cheng; Liao Cheng-ting	South Korea; Jang Woo-jin; Cho Dae-seong; An Jae-hyun; Lim Jong-hoon; Oh Jun-sung
Women's team	Japan; Hina Hayata; Miwa Harimoto; Mima Ito; Miu Hirano; Satsuki Odo	China; Sun Yingsha; Wang Yidi; Chen Xingtong; Shi Xunyao; Kuai Man	India; Sreeja Akula; Manika Batra; Sutirtha Mukherjee; Ayhika Mukherjee; Diya Chitale
Women's team	Japan; Hina Hayata; Miwa Harimoto; Mima Ito; Miu Hirano; Satsuki Odo	China; Sun Yingsha; Wang Yidi; Chen Xingtong; Shi Xunyao; Kuai Man	Hong Kong; Doo Hoi Kem; Zhu Chengzhu; Lee Ho Ching; Ng Wing Lam; Karen Lee Hoi Man

== Medal table ==
Rank	Nation	Gold	Silver	Bronze	Total
1	Japan	3	2	3	8
2	China	2	2	1	5
3	North Korea	1	1	1	3
4	South Korea	1	0	3	4
5	Chinese Taipei	0	1	0	1
5	Singapore	0	1	0	1
7	India	0	0	3	3
8	Hong Kong	0	0	2	2
9	Malaysia	0	0	1	1
Totals (9 entries)		7	7	14	28
