= Sathiyan Gnanasekaran =

Indian table tennis player

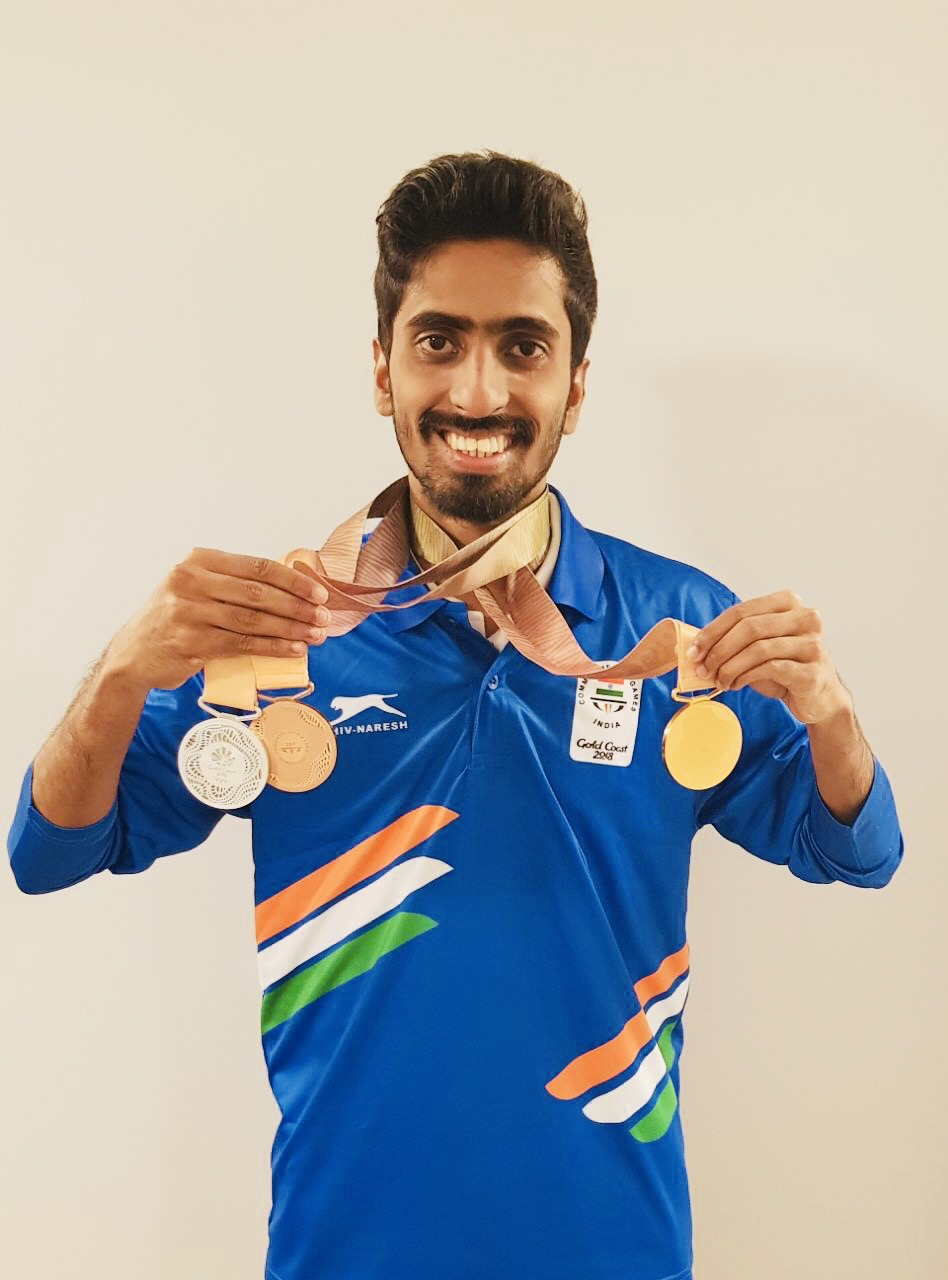
- Sathiyan posing with medals at the 2018 Commonwealth Games in Gold Coast

Personal information
- Nationality: India
- Born: Sathiyan Gnanasekaran; 8 January 1993 (age 33) Chennai, Tamil Nadu, India
- Height: 168 cm (5 ft 6 in)

Sport
- Country: India
- Sport: Table Tennis
- Highest ranking: 24
- Current ranking: 81 (5 October 2026)
Medal record
Men's Table Tennis
Representing India
Commonwealth Games
Gold medal – first place	2018 Gold Coast	Men's team
Gold medal – first place	2022 Birmingham	Men's team
Silver medal – second place	2018 Gold Coast	Men's doubles
Silver medal – second place	2022 Birmingham	Men's doubles
Bronze medal – third place	2018 Gold Coast	Mixed doubles
Bronze medal – third place	2022 Birmingham	Men's singles
Asian Games
Bronze medal – third place	2018 Jakarta	Men's team
Asian Championships
Bronze medal – third place	2021 Doha	Men's team
Bronze medal – third place	2021 Doha	Men's doubles
Bronze medal – third place	2023 Pyeongchang	Men's team
Bronze medal – third place	2024 Astana	Men's team
South Asian Games
Gold medal – first place	2016 Guwahati/Shillong	Men's doubles
Gold medal – first place	2016 Guwahati/Shillong	Men's team
Silver medal – second place	2016 Guwahati/Shillong	Men's singles
Silver medal – second place	2016 Guwahati/Shillong	Mixed doubles

Sathiyan Gnanasekaran (born 8 January 1993) is an Indian table tennis player, who is one of the highest ranked Indian men's singles players in the sport, currently ranked at 51 in the world as of 2 February 2026. He was a member of the Indian team that won back to back gold medals in the 2018 and 2022 Commonwealth Games.

In May 2019, Sathiyan attained his career best World ranking of 24 and became the first Indian paddler ever to break into the World Top-25 ITTF rankings.

He became the first Indian paddler to sign a contract with Okayama Rivets for the Japanese T-league. He has currently signed up with JURA MOREZ for the French PRO-A league.

He is an employee of ONGC & currently being supported by the GoSports Foundation through the Rahul Dravid Athlete Mentorship Programme.

== Achievements ==
Sathiyan announced himself in the world stage in Table Tennis when he won the ITTF Challenge Belgium Open title in the men's singles category in September 2016. This was his first ITTF pro tour title. In the final match played at De Haan in Belgium, he defeated the local player Nuytinck Cedric with a 4–0 score in the final - with 15–13, 11–6, 11–2, 17–15. With this victory, he became the first Indian table tennis player to win an ITTF event on European soil.

2017 had been a special year for Sathiyan where he won gold in the ITTF Challenge - Spanish Open, in Almeria (2017) in the men's singles category and created history by becoming the first Indian Table Tennis player ever to win two ITTF pro tour titles.

In April 2018, he won three medals in his debut Commonwealth Games at Gold Coast, Australia.

In August 2018, He also played an important role by winning both his matches against Japan in the Men Team category quarterfinals and won a historic bronze medal at the Asian Games 2018 held at Jakarta for the first time ever after a gap of 60 years.

He was conferred with Arjuna Award in the year 2018.

In September 2019, he pulled off the biggest win of his career by defeating the Japanese prodigy Tomokazu Harimoto in straight sets at the Asian TT Championships 2019. In the same event, he also gave a stellar performance by becoming the first Indian ever after a gap of 43 years to reach the Quarterfinals in Men Singles category.

On November 29, 2019, Sathiyan made his debut World Cup appearance and defeated higher-ranked French player Simon Gauzy 11–13, 9–11, 11–8, 14–12, 7–11, 11–5, 11-8 before beating world number 24 Jonathan Groth of Denmark 11–9, 7–11, 11–5, 11–6, 11–2, to top his group and reach the round of 16 in 2019 ITTF Men's World Cup. The world number 30 G Sathiyan, went down 1-4 (11-7, 8–11, 5–11, 9–11, 8–11) to Timo Boll in the pre-quarters.

In 2021, Sathiyan competed in the 2020 Summer Olympics in Tokyo.

In the 2022 Birmingham Commonwealth Games, Sathiyan again won three medals with Gold in Men Team, Silver in Men Doubles and also a Bronze in Men Singles. G. Sathiyan won bronze in TT Men's singles.

== Awards ==
- Arjuna Award 2018
- TOISA Table Tennis player of the year award 2017 (Jury choice)
