= Harmeet Desai =

Indian table tennis player

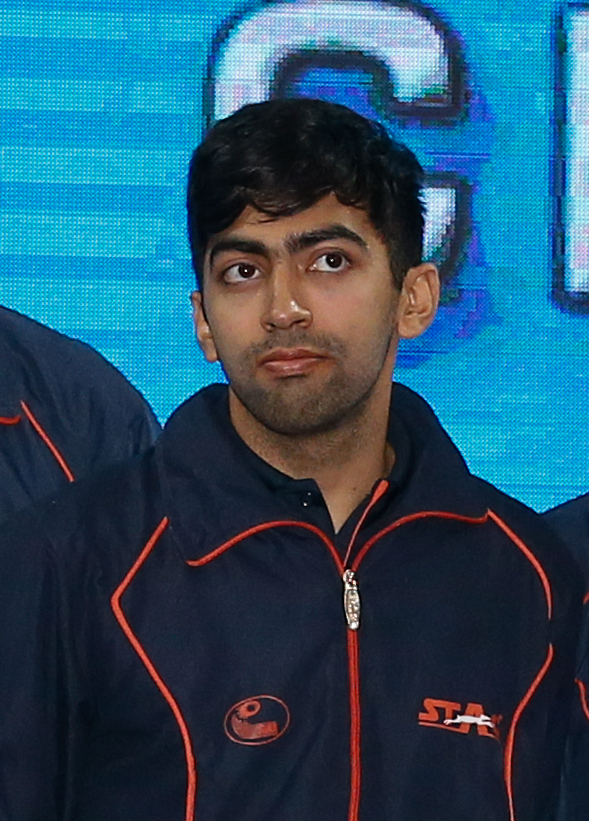

Personal information
- Nationality: Indian
- Born: 19 July 1993 (age 33) Surat, Gujarat, India

Sport
- Sport: Table tennis
- Playing style: offensive
- Highest ranking: 59 (1 February 2024)
- Current ranking: 102 (2 November 2026)
Medal record
Men's Table tennis
Representing India
Commonwealth Games
Gold medal – first place	2018 Gold Coast	Men's team
Gold medal – first place	2022 Birmingham	Men's team
Bronze medal – third place	2018 Gold Coast	Men's doubles
Asian Games
Bronze medal – third place	2018 Jakarta	Men's team
Asian Championships
Bronze medal – third place	2021 Doha	Men's team
Bronze medal – third place	2021 Doha	Men's doubles
Bronze medal – third place	2023 Pyeongchang	Men's team
Bronze medal – third place	2024 Astana	Men's team
Bronze medal – third place	2026 Tashkent	Mixed doubles
South Asian Games
Gold medal – first place	2019 Kathmandu / Pokhara	Men's doubles
Gold medal – first place	2019 Kathmandu / Pokhara	Mixed doubles
Gold medal – first place	2019 Kathmandu / Pokhara	Men's team
Silver medal – second place	2019 Kathmandu / Pokhara	Men's singles

Harmeet Desai (born 19 July 1993) is an Indian table tennis player. He is from Surat. In 2018 Commonwealth Games held at Gold Coast, Australia, He won gold in men's team event with Sharath Kamal, Anthony Amalraj, Sathiyan Gnanasekaran & Sanil Shetty and bronze in Men's doubles event with Sanil Shetty. Harmeet Desai won the men's singles title at Commonwealth Table Tennis Championships 2019 at Cuttack, defeated favorite Sathiyan Gnanasekaran to claim the men's singles title. He has been honoured with the Arjuna Award by the Ministry of Youth Affairs and Sports, Government of India in 2019.

== Achievements ==
Harmeet Desai won a gold medal in the men's team and a bronze medal in the men's doubles category for table tennis at the Commonwealth Games 2018 that were held in Gold Coast, Queensland in Australia.He was awarded the Arjuna award by Indian President Ram Nath Kovind in August 2019 for his outstanding performance in table tennis.

He won the ITTF Indonesia Open Tournament in November 2019. This was a historic moment as he was the first Indian to win an ITTF tournament in the Asian Continent. In January 2020, he created history when he won the National Championship title for the year 2019 - 2020 as he was the first player from the state of Gujarat to win the National Champion title in table tennis. He was a member of the Indian Junior Team that created history by winning the Junior Championships. He participated and won a bronze medal in the 2018 Asian Games held in the city of Jakarta.

In Birmingham 2022 Desai won gold medal in Men's Team Category with Sharath Kamal, Sathiyan Gnanasekaran & Sanil Shetty.

In 2023, UTT season 4, Harmeet Desai's team Goa Challengers became the champion after defeating Chennai Lions. At WTT Contender Lagos 2023, he took down WR12 Korean Jang Woo-jin in the Round of 16 and at WTT Contender Tunis 2023, he beat another WR11 Korean paddler Lim Jong-hoon, scripting biggest wins of his career.
