= Lam Siu-hang =

Hong Kong table tennis player

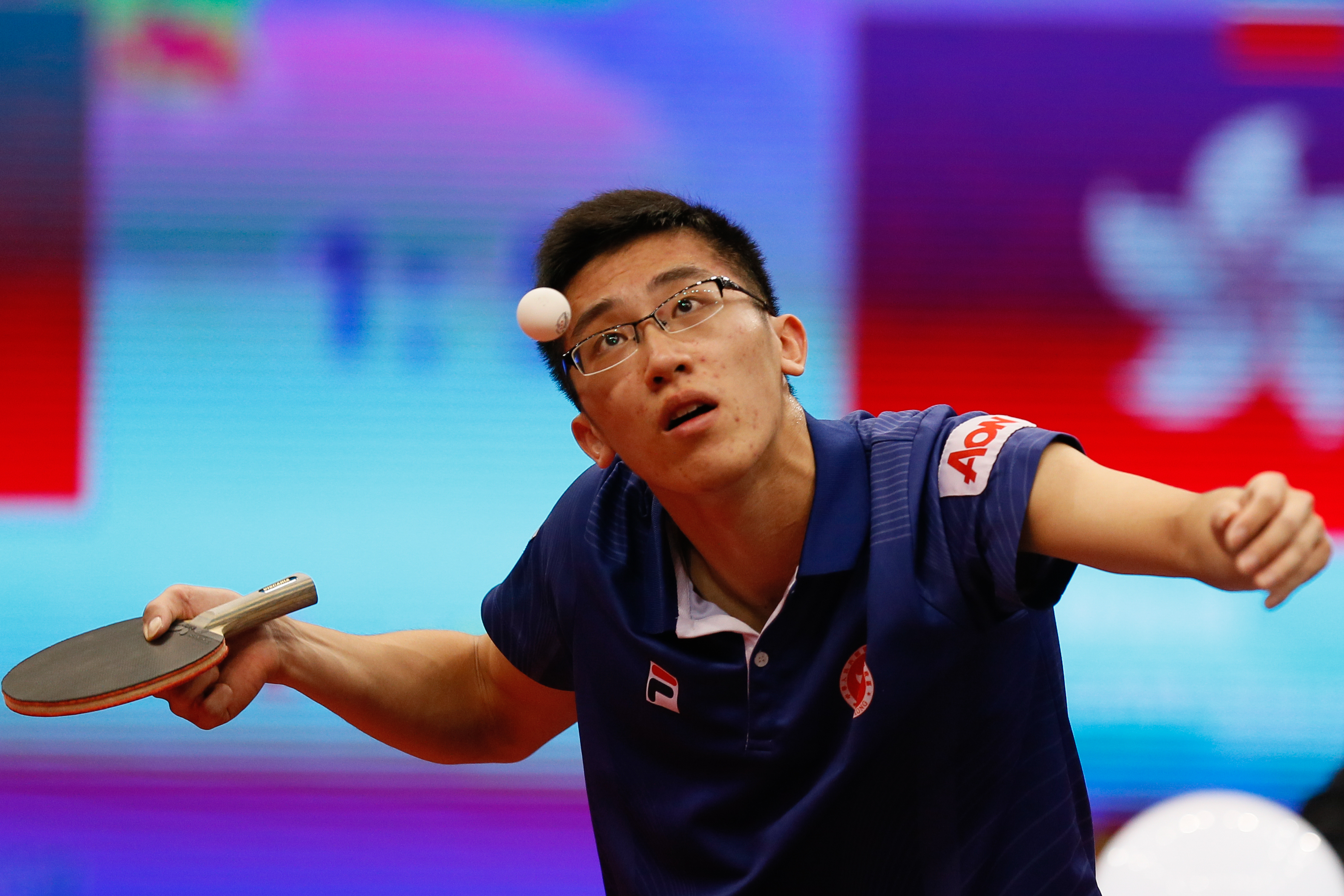
- Lam at the 2017 Asian Championships

Personal information
- Born: 12 December 1996 (age 29) Hong Kong
- Height: 182 cm (6 ft 0 in)
- Weight: 73 kg (161 lb)

Sport
- Sport: Table tennis
- Playing style: Right-handed shakehand grip
- Highest ranking: 56 (January 2018)
- Current ranking: 107 (2 November 2026)
Medal record
Men's table tennis
Representing Hong Kong
World Cup
Bronze medal – third place	2024 Chengdu	Mixed team
Asian Championships
Silver medal – second place	2025 Bhubaneswar	Team
Bronze medal – third place	2019 Yogyakarta	Men's doubles

Lam Siu-hang (Chinese: 林兆恒; Jyutping: Lam^{4} Siu^{6} Hang^{4}, born 12 December 1996) is a Hong Kong table tennis player.

== Achievements ==
=== ITTF Tours ===
Men's doubles

2015	Australian Open	World Tour	Ho Kwan Kit	Harmeet Desai; Soumyajit Ghosh	3–1	1st place, gold medalist(s)
2018	Polish Open	Challenge	Jiang Tianyi	Jeoung Young-sik; Lee Sang-su	0–3	2nd place, silver medalist(s)
2019	Indonesia Open	Challenge	Kwan Man Ho	Ibrahima Diaw; Padasak Tanviriyavechakul	0–3	2nd place, silver medalist(s)
