= Ng Pak Nam =

Hong Kong table tennis player

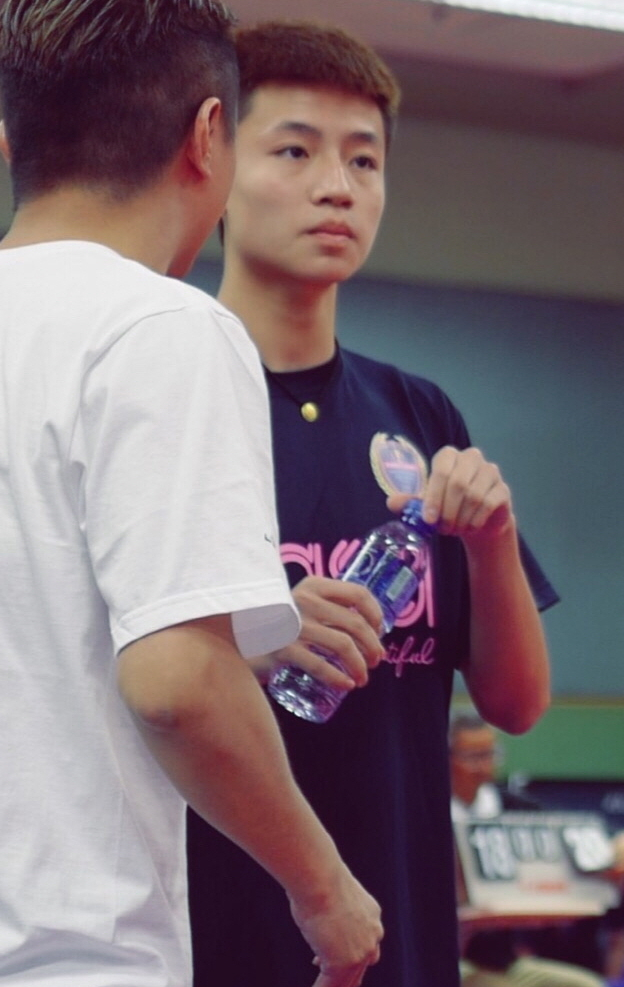
- Ng in 2017

Personal information
- Born: 8 August 1998 (age 27) Jinjiang, Fujian, China
- Height: 179 cm (5 ft 10 in)
- Weight: 66 kg (146 lb)

Sport
- Sport: Table tennis
- Playing style: Right-handed shakehand grip
- Highest ranking: 56 (March 2018)
Medal record
Representing Hong Kong
Asian Championships
Bronze medal – third place	2019 Yogyakarta	Men's doubles

Ng Pak Nam
- Traditional Chinese: 吳柏男
- Simplified Chinese: 吴柏男
Transcriptions
Standard Mandarin
- Hanyu Pinyin: Wú Bǎinán
Yue: Cantonese
- Jyutping: Ng^{4} Paak^{3} Naam^{4}

Ng Pak Nam (simplified Chinese: 吴柏男; traditional Chinese: 吳柏男, born 8 August 1998) is a Hong Kong table tennis player. A native of Fujian, China, he spent five years in Shanghai for table tennis. He is able to represent Hong Kong because his father and grandfather are both Hong Kongers.

== Achievements ==
=== ITTF Tours ===
Men's doubles

Year	Tournament	Level	Partner	Final opponents	Score	Rank
2017	Polish Open	Challenge	Ho Kwan Kit	Harmeet Desai; Soumyajit Ghosh	3–1	1st place, gold medalist(s)
