= Lim Jong-hoon =

South Korean table tennis player

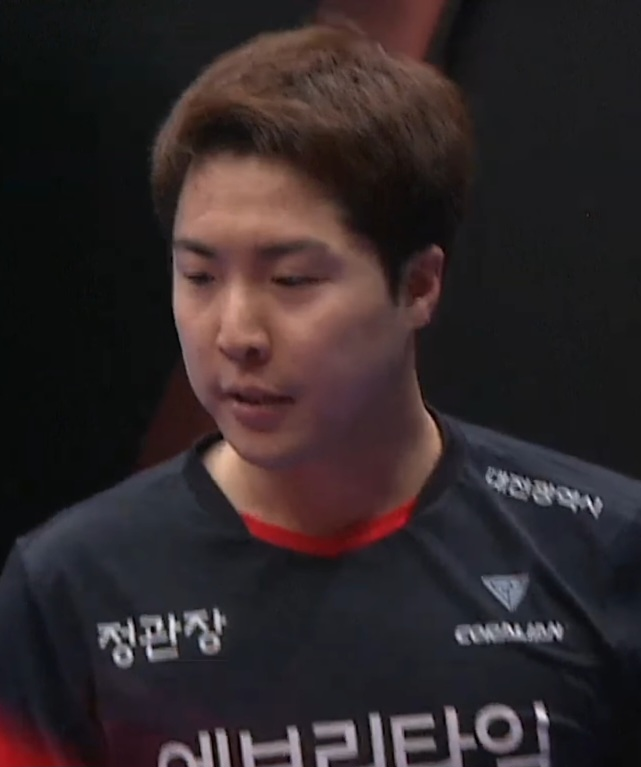
- Lim in 2023

Personal information
- Born: 21 January 1997 (age 29) Daejeon, South Korea
- Height: 178 cm (5 ft 10 in)

Sport
- Sport: Table tennis
- Playing style: Left-handed shakehand hold
- Highest ranking: 11 (18 April 2023)
- Current ranking: 38 (2 November 2026)
Medal record
Men's table tennis
Representing South Korea
Olympic Games
Bronze medal – third place	2024 Paris	Mixed doubles
World Championships
Silver medal – second place	2021 Houston	Doubles
Silver medal – second place	2023 Durban	Doubles
Bronze medal – third place	2018 Halmstad	Team
Bronze medal – third place	2024 Busan	Team
Bronze medal – third place	2025 Doha	Mixed doubles
World Cup
Silver medal – second place	2023 Chengdu	Mixed team
Asian Games
Silver medal – second place	2018 Jakarta	Team
Silver medal – second place	2022 Hangzhou	Doubles
Silver medal – second place	2022 Hangzhou	Team
Bronze medal – third place	2022 Hangzhou	Mixed doubles
Bronze medal – third place	2026 Aichi-Nagoya	Mixed doubles
Bronze medal – third place	2026 Aichi-Nagoya	Team
Asian Championships
Gold medal – first place	2021 Doha	Team
Gold medal – first place	2024 Astana	Doubles
Silver medal – second place	2021 Doha	Doubles
Bronze medal – third place	2023 Pyeongchang	Doubles
Bronze medal – third place	2023 Pyeongchang	Mixed doubles
Bronze medal – third place	2023 Pyeongchang	Team
Bronze medal – third place	2024 Astana	Mixed doubles
Bronze medal – third place	2024 Astana	Team
Asian Cup
Silver medal – second place	2022 Bangkok	Singles
Universiade
Silver medal – second place	2017 Taipei	Doubles
Bronze medal – third place	2017 Taipei	Team

- Lim Jong-hoon
- Hangul: 임종훈
- Hanja: 林鐘勲
- RR: Im Jonghun
- MR: Im Chonghun

Lim Jong-hoon (Korean: 임종훈, born 21 January 1997) is a South Korean table tennis player.

== Career ==
Lim and Jang Woo-jin were the men's doubles winners at the 2016 Belarus Open, the 2018 Korea Open, and the 2018 ITTF World Tour Grand Finals. Lim also won men's singles at the 2018 Polish Open.
