= 2023 Asian Table Tennis Championships – Men's team =

Men's team at the 2023 Asian Table Tennis Championships
- Venue: Yongpyong Dome
- Date: 3–6 September 2023
- Competitors: 84 from 21 nations

The men's team in table tennis at the 2023 Asian Table Tennis Championships was held at Yongpyong Dome from 3 to 6 September 2023.

== Schedule ==
All times are Korea Standard Time (UTC+09:00)

Date	Time	Round
Sunday, 3 September 2023	10:00	Group R1
Sunday, 3 September 2023	14:00	Group R2
Sunday, 3 September 2023	18:00	Group R3
Monday, 4 September 2023	12:00	Group winners
Monday, 4 September 2023	12:00	11–14 semifinals
Monday, 4 September 2023	12:00	15–18 semifinals
Monday, 4 September 2023	12:00	19–21 semifinals
Monday, 4 September 2023	17:00	Quarterfinals
Monday, 4 September 2023	17:00	9–10 final
Monday, 4 September 2023	17:00	11–12 final
Monday, 4 September 2023	17:00	13–14 final
Monday, 4 September 2023	17:00	15–16 final
Monday, 4 September 2023	17:00	17–18 final
Monday, 4 September 2023	17:00	19–20 final
Tuesday, 5 September 2023	10:00	5–8 semifinals
Tuesday, 5 September 2023	14:00	5–6 final
Tuesday, 5 September 2023	14:00	7–8 final
Wednesday, 6 September 2023	10:00; 12:00	Semifinals
Wednesday, 6 September 2023	19:00	Final

== Format ==
Teams were made up of three players(Some teams also had an additional player as a back up). Each team match was made up of five individual matches and ended when either side has won three matches. The order of a team match was as follows: a doubles match, two singles matches, and if neither side had won three matches by this point, a maximum of two extra singles matches were played.

== First division ==
=== Group 1 ===
Pos	Team	Pld	W	L	Pts	Promotion	HKG	MGL	SRI
1	Hong Kong	2	2	0	4	Promote to First Division semifinals	—	3–0	3–0
2	Mongolia	2	1	1	3		0–3	—	3–0
3	Sri Lanka	2	0	2	2		0–3	0–3	—

Source: ITTF

=== Group 2 ===
Pos	Team	Pld	W	L	Pts	Promotion	KAZ	BAN	NEP	KGZ
1	Kazakhstan	3	3	0	6	Promote to First Division semifinals	—	3–0	3–0	3–0
2	Bangladesh	3	2	1	5		0–3	—	3–1	3–1
3	Nepal	3	1	2	4		0–3	1–3	—	3–0
4	Kyrgyzstan	3	0	3	3		0–3	1–3	0–3	—

Source: ITTF

=== Group 3 ===
Pos	Team	Pld	W	L	Pts	Promotion	CHN	KSA	QAT	PAK
1	China	3	3	0	6	Promote to First Division quarterfinals	—	3–0	3–0	3–0
2	Saudi Arabia	3	2	1	5		0–3	—	3–2	3–0
3	Qatar	3	1	2	4		0–3	2–3	—	3–0
4	Pakistan	3	0	3	3		0–3	0–3	0–3	—

Source: ITTF

=== Group 4 ===
Pos	Team	Pld	W	L	Pts	Promotion	THA	MAS	UZB	LAO
1	Thailand	3	3	0	6	Promote to First Division quarterfinals	—	3–2	3–0	3–0
2	Malaysia	3	2	1	5		2–3	—	3–0	3–1
3	Uzbekistan	3	1	2	4		0–3	0–3	—	3–0
4	Laos	3	0	3	3		0–3	1–3	0–3	—

Source: ITTF

=== Main bracket ===
Group winners
Kazakhstan	3
Thailand	2
China	3
Hong Kong	0

Finals
Kazakhstan
China
9th place
Thailand	1
Hong Kong	3

=== 11th place bracket ===
11th-14th place
Bangladesh	0
Saudi Arabia	3
Malaysia	3
Mongolia	0

11th place
Saudi Arabia	0
Malaysia	3
13th place
Bangladesh	2
Mongolia	3

=== 15th place bracket ===
15th-18th place
Nepal	1
Sri Lanka	3
Uzbekistan	3
Qatar	1

11th place
Sri Lanka	0
Uzbekistan	3
13th place
Nepal	0
Qatar	3

=== 19th place bracket ===
19th-24th place
Laos	Bye
Kyrgyzstan	2
Pakistan	3

19th place
Laos	0
Pakistan	3

== Champion division ==
=== Main bracket ===
Source: ITTF

Quarterfinals
South Korea	3
Kazakhstan	0
China	3
Japan	0
India	3
Singapore	0
Iran	2
Chinese Taipei	3

Semifinals
South Korea	0
China	3
India	0
Chinese Taipei	3

Finals
China	3
Chinese Taipei	0

=== 5th place bracket ===
5th-8th place
Kazakhstan	1
Japan	3
Singapore	0
Iran	3

5th place
Japan	3
Iran	0
7th place
Kazakhstan	0
Singapore	3
