= 2021 Asian Table Tennis Championships – Men's team =

Men's team at the 2021 Asian Table Tennis Championships
- Venue: Doha Hall
- Date: September 28, 2021 – October 1, 2021
- Competitors: 112 from 28 nations

The men's team in table tennis at the 2021 Asian Table Tennis Championships was held at Doha Hall from 28 September to 1 October 2021.

China did not participate at the event.

== Schedule ==
All times are Arabia Standard Time (UTC+03:00)

Date	Time	Round
Tuesday, 28 September 2021	9:00	Group R1
Tuesday, 28 September 2021	10:30	Group R1
Tuesday, 28 September 2021	15:00	Group R2
Tuesday, 28 September 2021	16:30	Group R2
Tuesday, 28 September 2021	18:00	Group R3
Tuesday, 28 September 2021	19:30	Group R3
Wednesday, 29 September 2021	10:45	First Division quarterfinals
Wednesday, 29 September 2021	10:45	13–18 quarterfinals
Wednesday, 29 September 2021	10:45	19–24 quarterfinals
Wednesday, 29 September 2021	10:45	25–28 semifinals
Wednesday, 29 September 2021	16:45	Champion Division quarterfinals
Wednesday, 29 September 2021	16:45	First Division semifinals
Wednesday, 29 September 2021	16:45	13–16 semifinals
Wednesday, 29 September 2021	16:45	19–22 semifinals
Wednesday, 29 September 2021	20:15	11–12 final
Wednesday, 29 September 2021	20:15	17–18 final
Wednesday, 29 September 2021	20:15	23–24 final
Wednesday, 29 September 2021	20:15	25–26 final
Wednesday, 29 September 2021	20:15	27–28 final
Thursday, 30 September 2021	9:00	First Division final
Thursday, 30 September 2021	9:00	9–10 final
Thursday, 30 September 2021	9:00	13–14 final
Thursday, 30 September 2021	9:00	15–16 final
Thursday, 30 September 2021	9:00	19–20 final
Thursday, 30 September 2021	9:00	21–22 final
Thursday, 30 September 2021	13:00	Champion Division quarterfinals
Thursday, 30 September 2021	13:00	5–8 semifinals
Friday, 1 October 2021	9:00; 11:15	Champion Division semifinals
Friday, 1 October 2021	11:15	5–6 final
Friday, 1 October 2021	11:15	7–8 final
Friday, 1 October 2021	19:00	Champion Division Final

== Format ==
Teams were made up of three players(Some teams also had an additional player as a back up). Each team match was made up of five individual matches and ended when either side has won three matches. The order of a team match was as follows: a doubles match, two singles matches, and if neither side had won three matches by this point, a maximum of two extra singles matches were played.

== First division ==
=== Group 1 ===
Pos	Team	Pld	W	L	Pts	Promotion	SGP	NEP	PLE
1	Singapore	2	2	0	4	Promote to First Division semifinals	—	3–0	3–0
2	Nepal	2	1	1	3		0–3	—	3–1
3	Palestine	2	0	2	2		0–3	1–3	—

Source: Asian Table Tennis Union

=== Group 2 ===
Pos	Team	Pld	W	L	Pts	Promotion	THA	SRI	BAN
1	Thailand	2	2	0	4	Promote to First Division semifinals	—	3–1	3–0
2	Sri Lanka	2	1	1	3		1–3	—	3–0
3	Bangladesh	2	0	2	2		0–3	0–3	—

Source: Asian Table Tennis Union

=== Group 3 ===
Pos	Team	Pld	W	L	Pts	Promotion	KSA	QAT	UAE	MGL
1	Saudi Arabia	3	3	0	6	Promote to First Division quarterfinals	—	3–0	3–0	3–0
2	Qatar	3	2	1	5		0–3	—	3–0	3–0
3	United Arab Emirates	3	1	2	4		0–3	0–3	—	3–0
4	Mongolia	3	0	3	3		0–3	0–3	0–3	—

Source: Asian Table Tennis Union

=== Group 4 ===
Pos	Team	Pld	W	L	Pts	Promotion	BRN	INA	AFG	OMA
1	Bahrain	3	3	0	6	Promote to First Division quarterfinals	—	3–2	3–0	3–0
2	Indonesia	3	2	1	5		2–3	—	3–0	3–0
3	Afghanistan	3	1	2	4		0–3	0–3	—	3–2
4	Oman	3	0	3	3		0–3	0–3	2–3	—

Source: Asian Table Tennis Union

=== Group 5 ===
Pos	Team	Pld	W	L	Pts	Promotion	UZB	KUW	TJK	KGZ
1	Uzbekistan	3	3	0	6	Promote to First Division quarterfinals	—	3–0	3–0	3–0
2	Kuwait	3	1	2	4		0–3	—	3–1	2–3
3	Tajikistan	3	1	2	4		0–3	1–3	—	3–1
4	Kyrgyzstan	3	1	2	4		0–3	3–2	1–3	—

Source: Asian Table Tennis Union

=== Group 6 ===
Pos	Team	Pld	W	L	Pts	Promotion	KAZ	JOR	IRQ	MDV
1	Kazakhstan	3	3	0	6	Promote to First Division quarterfinals	—	3–0	3–0	3–1
2	Jordan	3	2	1	5		0–3	—	3–1	3–0
3	Iraq	3	1	2	4		0–3	1–3	—	3–0
4	Maldives	3	0	3	3		1–3	0–3	0–3	—

Source: Asian Table Tennis Union

=== Main bracket ===
First Division Quarterfinals
51	Uzbekistan	2
31	Saudi Arabia	3
41	Bahrain	0
61	Kazakhstan	3

First Division Semifinals
11	Singapore	3
31	Saudi Arabia	1
61	Kazakhstan	3
21	Thailand	1
11th place
51	Uzbekistan	3
41	Bahrain	2

First Division Final
11	Singapore
61	Kazakhstan
9th place
31	Saudi Arabia	3
21	Thailand	1

=== 13th place bracket ===
13th-18th place
32	Qatar	3
22	Sri Lanka	2
62	Jordan	3
42	Indonesia	1

13th-16th place
52	Kuwait	0
32	Qatar	3
62	Jordan	3
12	Nepal	0
17th place
22	Sri Lanka	2
42	Indonesia	3

13th place
32	Qatar	1
62	Jordan	3
15th place
52	Kuwait	3
12	Nepal	1

=== 19th place bracket ===
19th-24th place
33	United Arab Emirates	1
53	Tajikistan	3
43	Afghanistan	2
23	Bangladesh	3

19th-22nd place
63	Iraq	3
53	Tajikistan	0
23	Bangladesh	3
13	Palestine	1
23rd place
33	United Arab Emirates	3
43	Afghanistan	2

19th place
63	Iraq	'3
23	Bangladesh	0
21st place
53≥	Tajikistan	3
13	Palestine	2

=== 25th place bracket ===
25th-28th place
64	Maldives	1
34	Mongolia	3
44	Oman	2
54	Kyrgyzstan	3

25th place
34	Mongolia	3
54	Kyrgyzstan	0
27th place
64	Maldives	3
44	Oman	2

== Champion division ==
=== Main bracket ===
Quarterfinals
South Korea	3
Hong Kong	1
Iran	1
India	3
Japan	3
Kazakhstan	0
Singapore	0
Chinese Taipei	3

Semifinals
South Korea	3
India	0
Japan	2
Chinese Taipei	3

Finals
South Korea	3
Chinese Taipei	1

=== 5th place bracket ===
5th-8th place
Hong Kong	2
Iran	3
Kazakhstan	2
Singapore	3

5th place
Iran	3
Singapore	0
7th place
Hong Kong	3
Kazakhstan	0

== Final standings ==
Rank	Team
1st place, gold medalist(s)	South Korea
2nd place, silver medalist(s)	Chinese Taipei
3rd place, bronze medalist(s)	India
3rd place, bronze medalist(s)	Japan
5	Iran
6	Singapore
7	Hong Kong
8	Kazakhstan
9	Saudi Arabia
10	Thailand
11	Uzbekistan
12	Bahrain
13	Jordan
14	Qatar
15	Kuwait
16	Nepal
17	Indonesia
18	Sri Lanka
19	Iraq
20	Bangladesh
21	Tajikistan
22	Palestine
23	United Arab Emirates
24	Afghanistan
25	Mongolia
26	Kyrgyzstan
27	Maldives
28	Oman
