= 2013 Asian Table Tennis Championships =

- Date: June 30 - July 7
- Edition: 21st
- Location: Busan, South Korea
- Venue: Busan Sajik Indoor Gymnasium

Champions

Men's singles
- (China) Ma Long

Women's singles
- (China) Guo Yan

Men's doubles
- (China) Yan An / (China) Zhou Yu

Women's doubles
- (China) Ding Ning / (China) Guo Yan

Mixed doubles
- (China) Xu Xin / (China) Guo Yan
← 2011 ·	Asian Table Tennis Championships	· 2015 →

The 2013 Asian Table Tennis Championships were held in Busan, South Korea, from June 30 to July 7, 2013. The Championships were the 21st edition of the Asian Table Tennis Championships.

== Schedule ==
Seven different events were contested at the Championships.

Date	June 30	July 1	July 2	July 3	July 4	July 5	July 6	July 7
Men's team				F				
Women's team			F					
Men's singles					1R, 2R		3R, 4R	QF, SF, F
Women's singles				1R	2R	3R, 4R, QF	SF, F	
Men's doubles					1R, 2R	3R, QF	SF, F	
Women's doubles							1R, 2R	QF, SF, F
Mixed doubles				1R, 2R, 3R	QF	SF, F		

== Medal summary ==
* Host nation (South Korea)

Rank	Nation	Gold	Silver	Bronze	Total
1	China	6	4	5	15
2	South Korea*	1	0	2	3
3	Japan	0	2	3	5
4	Hong Kong	0	1	1	2
5	Singapore	0	0	2	2
6	Chinese Taipei	0	0	1	1
Totals (6 entries)		7	7	14	28

== Events ==
Event	Gold	Silver	Bronze
Men's team	China; Zhou Yu; Ma Long; Xu Xin; Yan An; Fan Zhendong	Japan; Jun Mizutani; Koki Niwa; Kazuhiro Chan; Kenta Matsudaira; Seiya Kishikawa	South Korea; Lee Jung-Woo; Seo Hyun-Deok; Jung Young-Sik; Lee Sang-Su; Cho Eon-Rae
Men's team	China; Zhou Yu; Ma Long; Xu Xin; Yan An; Fan Zhendong	Japan; Jun Mizutani; Koki Niwa; Kazuhiro Chan; Kenta Matsudaira; Seiya Kishikawa	Chinese Taipei; Chuang Chih-Yuan; Chen Chien-An; Wu Chih-Chi; Chiang Hung-Chieh; Huang Sheng-Sheng
Women's team	China; Ding Ning; Liu Shiwen; Guo Yue; Zhu Yuling; Chen Meng	Hong Kong; Jiang Huajun; Lee Ho Ching; Guan Mengyuan; Li Ching Wan	Japan; Kasumi Ishikawa; Fukuhara Ai; Sayaka Hirano; Misaki Morizono; Marina Matsuzawa
Women's team	China; Ding Ning; Liu Shiwen; Guo Yue; Zhu Yuling; Chen Meng	Hong Kong; Jiang Huajun; Lee Ho Ching; Guan Mengyuan; Li Ching Wan	Singapore; Feng Tianwei; Yu Mengyu; Li Isabelle Siyun; Yee Herng Hwee
Men's singles	(China) Ma Long	(China) Yan An	(China) Xu Xin
Men's singles	(China) Ma Long	(China) Yan An	(Japan) Kenta Matsudaira
Women's singles	(China) Liu Shiwen	(China) Ding Ning	(China) Chen Meng
Women's singles	(China) Liu Shiwen	(China) Ding Ning	(China) Zhu Yuling
Men's doubles	(China) Zhou Yu (China) Yan An	(China) Ma Long (China) Xu Xin	(Japan) Kenta Matsudaira (Japan) Koki Niwa
Men's doubles	(China) Zhou Yu (China) Yan An	(China) Ma Long (China) Xu Xin	(Singapore) Gao Ning (Singapore) Yang Zi
Women's doubles	(China) Zhu Yuling (China) Chen Meng	(China) Ding Ning (China) Liu Shiwen	(South Korea) Park Young-Sook (South Korea) Yang Ha-Eun
Women's doubles	(China) Zhu Yuling (China) Chen Meng	(China) Ding Ning (China) Liu Shiwen	(Hong Kong) Doo Hoi Kem (Hong Kong) Li Ching Wan
Mixed doubles	(South Korea) Lee Sang-Su (South Korea) Park Young-Sook	(Japan) Koki Niwa (Japan) Sayaka Hirano	(China) Yan An (China) Zhu Yuling
Mixed doubles	(South Korea) Lee Sang-Su (South Korea) Park Young-Sook	(Japan) Koki Niwa (Japan) Sayaka Hirano	(China) Fan Zhendong (China) Chen Meng
