= Noshad Alamian =

Iranian table tennis player

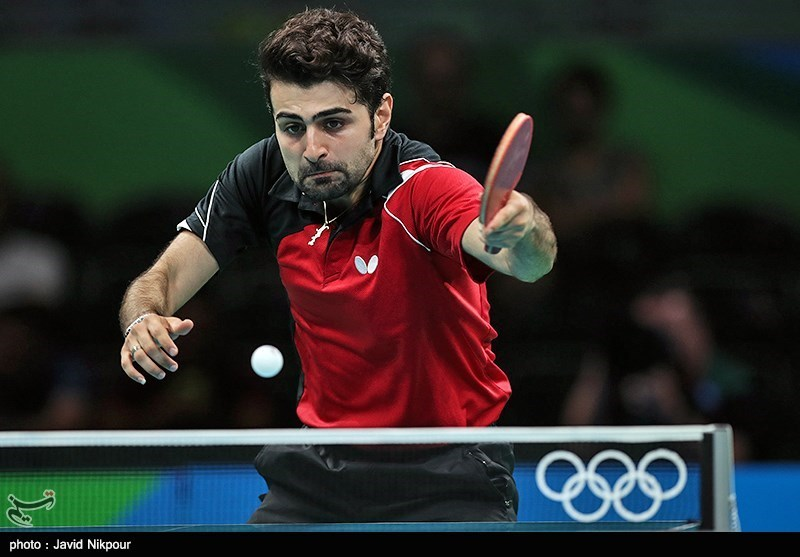
- Noshad Alamian in the 2016 Summer Olympics

Personal information
- Full name: Noshad Alamian Darounkolaei
- Born: 21 November 1991 (age 34) Babol, Mazandaran, Iran
- Height: 1.70 m (5 ft 7 in)
- Weight: 65 kg (143 lb)

Sport
- Sport: Table tennis
- Club: Petrochimi Bandar Imam
- Playing style: Left-handed; Offensive; Power Spin
- Equipment: Blade: BUTTERFLY Timo Boll ALC; Forehand Rubber: BUTTERFLY Tenergy 05 2.1; Backhand Rubber: BUTTERFLY Tenergy 05 2.1
- Highest ranking: 40 (December 2012)
- Current ranking: 144 (2 November 2026)
Medal record
Men's table tennis
Representing Iran
Asian Games
Bronze medal – third place	2018 Jakarta	Singles
Bronze medal – third place	2022 Hangzhou	Doubles
Bronze medal – third place	2022 Hangzhou	Team
Bronze medal – third place	2026 Aichi-Nagoya	Singles
Islamic Solidarity Games
Gold medal – first place	2017 Baku	Singles
Gold medal – first place	2017 Baku	Team
Gold medal – first place	2021 Konya	Team

Noshad Alamian Darounkolaei (Persian: نوشاد عالمیان درونكلایی, born 21 November 1991 in Babol) is an Iranian table tennis player.

Alamian made a breakthrough at 2008 ITTF World Junior Championships held in Madrid, Spain by beating junior world no. 1 Kenta Matsudaira; despite being coachless, he finished 5th overall.

He won the 2009 Doha Junior Open, as part of the ITTF Junior Circuit beating Paraguayan Marcelo Aguirre in the final, 4–3.

He also won a bronze medal in doubles event at the WTT contender series Qatar 2021.

In 2012 and 2016, he played in the Summer Olympics.

He has won a bronze medal in the 2018 Asian Games Jakarta Indonesia, the first for Iran in a singles event since 52 years, after beating Wong Chun Ting from Hong Kong.

His younger brother, Nima Alamian, is table tennis player too. Playing together in the men's team and men's doubles events at the 2022 Asian Games, the brothers won two bronze medals for Iran.

He qualified for the Paris 2024 Olympic Games through the ranking.

== Best results ==
- 2013 – Asian Cup: 4th place
- 2012 – Asian Cup: 4th place
- 2012 – World Tour Kuwait: Winner U-21
- 2011 – Asian Cup China: 6th place
- 2010 – Asian Cup China: 11th place
- 2009 – World Junior Circuit Portugal: Runner-up
- 2009 – World Junior Circuit Qatar: Winner
- 2009 – World Junior Circuit Manama: Runner-up
- 2008 – World Junior Circuit Qatar: Winner
- 2018 – Asian Games: Bronze Medal

== Major results ==
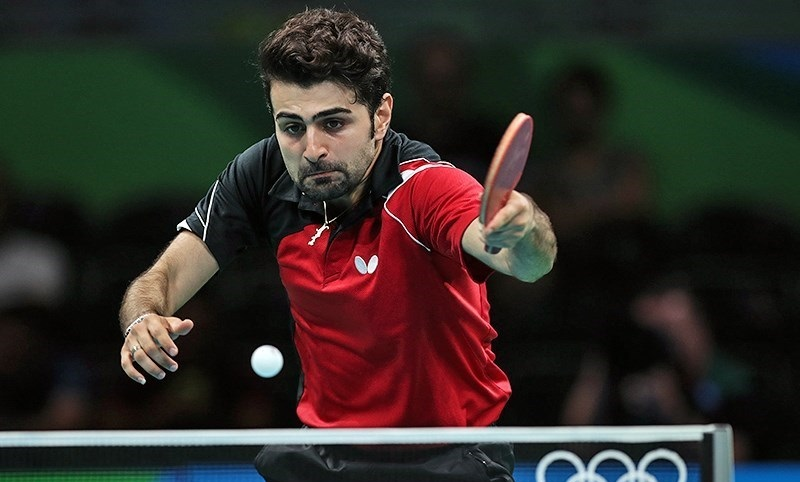
Alamian at the 2016 Summer Olympics

Year	Venue	Singles	Doubles	Team
Olympics
2012	London, United Kingdom	Round of 32		
2016	Rio de Janeiro, Brazil	First Round		
2024	Paris, France	Round of 32		
World Championships (Individual)
2009	Yokohama, Japan	Qualification		
2011	Rotterdam, Netherlands	Round of 128	Qualification	
2013	Paris, France	Round of 32	Round of 64	
2015	Suzhou, China	Round of 128	Round of 64	
2017	Düsseldorf, Germany	Round of 64	Round of 32	
2019	Budapest, Hungary	Round of 128	Round of 32	
2021	Houston, United States	Round of 64	Round of 32	
2023	Durban, South Africa	Round of 32	Round of 64	
2025	Doha, Qatar	Round of 64		
World Championships (Team)
2008	Guangzhou, China			40th place
2010	Moscow, Russia			35th place
2012	Dortmund, Germany			33rd place
2014	Tokyo, Japan			29th place
2016	Kuala Lumpur, Malaysia			33rd place
2018	Halmstad, Sweden			26th place
2022	Chengdu, China			Group Stage
2024	Busan, South Korea			Round of 16
2026	London, England	did not participate		
Asian Games
2010	Guangzhou, China	Round of 16	Round of 32	Group stage
2014	Incheon, South Korea	Round of 16	Round of 16	
2018	Jakarta, Indonesia	Bronze medal		Quarterfinals
2022	Hangzhou, China	Round of 16	Bronze medal	Bronze medal
2026	Nagoya, Japan	Bronze medal	Quarterfinals	Quarterfinals
Asian Championships
2009	Lucknow, India	Round of 64	Round of 64	9th place
2011	Macau, China	Round of 64	Round of 32	9th place
2013	Busan, South Korea	Round of 16	Round of 64	8th place
2015	Pattaya, Thailand	Round of 64	Round of 16	7th place
2017	Wuxi, China			
2019	Yogyakarta, Indonesia	Round of 32	Round of 16	7th place
2021	Doha, Qatar	Round of 16	Quarterfinals	5th place
2023	Pyeongchang, South Korea	Round of 16	Quarterfinals	6th place
2024	Astana, Kazakhstan	Round of 16	Round of 32	8th place
World Junior Championships
2008	Madrid, Spain	Quarterfinals		
Islamic Solidarity Games
2017	Baku, Azerbaijan	Gold Medal		Gold Medal
2022	Konya, Turkey			Gold Medal
