= 2020 Hungarian Open (table tennis) =

Tournament details
- Dates: 18 February 2020 – 23 February 2020
- Total prize money: US$170,000
- Venue: Budapest Olympic Hall
- Location: Budapest, Hungary

Champions
- Men's singles: (Japan) Tomokazu Harimoto
- Women's singles: (Japan) Mima Ito
- Men's doubles: (Germany) Benedikt Duda (Germany) Patrick Franziska
- Women's doubles: (Japan) Miu Hirano (Japan) Kasumi Ishikawa
- Mixed doubles: (Hong Kong) Wong Chun Ting (Hong Kong) Doo Hoi Kem

The 2020 Hungarian Open was the second event of the 2020 ITTF World Tour. It took place from 18–23 February in Budapest, Hungary.

== Men's singles ==
=== Seeds ===
1. (Japan) Tomokazu Harimoto (champion)
2. (Brazil) Hugo Calderano (quarterfinals)
3. (Germany) Dimitrij Ovtcharov (semifinals)
4. (Germany) Patrick Franziska (first round)
5. (Japan) Koki Niwa (first round)
6. (Japan) Jun Mizutani (first round)
7. (Hong Kong) Wong Chun Ting (first round)
8. (France) Simon Gauzy (first round)
9. (England) Liam Pitchford (semifinals)
10. (Belarus) Vladimir Samsonov (first round)
11. (Sweden) Kristian Karlsson (quarterfinals)
12. (United States) Kanak Jha (first round)
13. (Denmark) Jonathan Groth (first round)
14. (India) Sathiyan Gnanasekaran (second round)
15. (Austria) Daniel Habesohn (first round)
16. (Hungary) Bence Majoros (first round)

=== Top half ===
First Round
1	(Japan) T Harimoto	11	11	11	11
Q13	(Slovakia) Wang Y	6	4	5	9
Q15	(Iran) N Alamian	6	6	9	2
14	(India) S Gnanasekaran	11	11	11	11
16	(Hungary) B Majoros	11	12	2	6	12	6
Q2	(Greece) P Gionis	8	10	11	11	14	11
Q6	(Germany) B Duda	11	11	18	11
5	(Japan) K Niwa	9	6	16	8
6	(Japan) J Mizutani
Q7	(Czech Republic) P Sirucek	w	/	o
Q1	(Japan) S Togami	12	11	11	11	11
15	(Austria) D Habesohn	14	8	7	3	9
13	(Denmark) J Groth	11	6	9	7	5
Q3	(Poland) J Dyjas	7	11	11	11	11
Q10	(Croatia) A Gaćina	6	12	9	7	7
3	(Germany) D Ovtcharov	11	10	11	11	11

Second Round
1	(Japan) T Harimoto	11	11	11	11
14	(India) S Gnanasekaran	8	5	4	8
Q2	(Greece) P Gionis	8	1	5	11	7
Q6	(Germany) B Duda	11	11	11	8	11
Q7	(Czech Republic) P Sirucek	11	11	12	12
Q1	(Japan) S Togami	9	9	10	10
Q3	(Poland) J Dyjas	11	7	11	8	9	11	10
3	(Germany) D Ovtcharov	6	11	8	11	11	8	12

Quarterfinals
1	(Japan) T Harimoto	12	9	11	12	9	11
Q6	(Germany) B Duda	10	11	6	10	11	4
Q7	(Czech Republic) P Sirucek	11	3	6	11	11	8
3	(Germany) D Ovtcharov	9	11	11	13	9	11

Semifinals
1	(Japan) T Harimoto	11	11	11	11
3	(Germany) D Ovtcharov	9	8	4	8

=== Bottom half ===
First Round
4	(Germany) P Franziska	9	14	9	8	11	6
Q12	(Japan) T Jin	11	12	11	11	7	11
Q14	(Japan) Y Uda	11	9	11	11	11
12	(United States) K Jha	6	11	4	8	6
10	(Belarus) V Samsonov	1	10	11	4	10
Q8	(France) A Cassin	11	12	7	11	12
Q9	(Austria) R Gardos	11	15	14	11
7	(Hong Kong) Wong C T	3	13	12	7
8	(France) S Gauzy	16	11	13	11	5	9	8
Q5	(Germany) D Qiu	14	6	15	9	11	11	11
Q11	(Russia) A Shibaev	2	12	7	11	4	5
9	(England) L Pitchford	11	10	11	8	11	11
11	(Sweden) K Karlsson	13	13	9	11	11	11
Q4	(Slovenia) D Jorgić	15	11	11	8	1	9
Q16	(Hong Kong) Lam S H	4	8	11	11	11	8	5
2	(Brazil) H Calderano	11	11	8	7	4	11	11

Second Round
Q12	(Japan) T Jin	11	3	8	6	8
Q14	(Japan) Y Uda	4	11	11	11	11
Q8	(France) A Cassin	12	12	8	10	9	12	5
Q9	(Austria) R Gardos	10	10	11	12	11	10	11
Q5	(Germany) D Qiu	7	4	7	7
9	(England) L Pitchford	11	11	11	11
11	(Sweden) K Karlsson	11	13	9	11	9	9	11
2	(Brazil) H Calderano	8	11	11	7	11	11	7

Quarterfinals
Q14	(Japan) Y Uda	11	7	16	11	11	11
Q9	(Austria) R Gardos	6	11	18	7	6	7
9	(England) L Pitchford	11	13	11	11
11	(Sweden) K Karlsson	9	11	4	8

Semifinals
Q14	(Japan) Y Uda	11	11	11	5	11	11
9	(England) L Pitchford	13	8	5	11	6	7

=== Finals ===
Semifinals								Final
1	(Japan) Tomokazu Harimoto	11	11	11	11
3	(Germany) Dimitrij Ovtcharov	9	8	4	8			1	(Japan) Tomokazu Harimoto	7	11	11	11	11
Q14	(Japan) Yukiya Uda	11	11	11	5	11	11	Q14	(Japan) Yukiya Uda	11	8	2	6	9
9	(England) Liam Pitchford	13	8	5	11	6	7

== Women's singles ==
=== Seeds ===
1. (Japan) Mima Ito (champion)
2. (Japan) Kasumi Ishikawa (semifinals)
3. (Chinese Taipei) Cheng I-ching (final)
4. (Japan) Miu Hirano (quarterfinals)
5. (Hong Kong) Doo Hoi Kem (quarterfinals)
6. (Japan) Hitomi Sato (quarterfinals)
7. (Romania) Bernadette Szőcs (first round)
8. (Germany) Petrissa Solja (first round)
9. (Puerto Rico) Adriana Díaz (second round)
10. (Japan) Miyu Kato (second round)
11. (Chinese Taipei) Chen Szu-yu (first round)
12. (United States) Lily Zhang (first round)
13. (Hong Kong) Minnie Soo Wai Yam (second round)
14. (Germany) Han Ying (semifinals)
15. (Romania) Elizabeta Samara (first round)
16. (Hungary) Dóra Madarász (first round)

=== Top half ===
First Round
1	(Japan) M Ito	12	11	11	11
Q12	(Luxembourg) Ni XL	10	7	5	9
Q16	(Ukraine) M Pesotska	11	11	13	6	11
12	(United States) L Zhang	5	3	11	11	7
10	(Japan) M Kato	11	11	11	12
Q7	(Czech Republic) H Matelová	8	9	2	10
Q10	(Russia) P Mikhaylova	12	11	5	13	12
6	(Japan) H Sato	14	13	11	11	14
7	(Romania) B Szőcs	6	6	10	7
Q2	(Japan) H Hashimoto	11	11	11	11
Q11	(Spain) Liu X	5	9	5	5
14	(Germany) Han Y	11	11	11	11
11	(Chinese Taipei) Chen S-y	11	11	11	10	9	7	12
Q1	(India) M Batra	9	4	7	12	11	11	14
Q5	(Portugal) Fu Y	8	11	3	11	10	8
4	(Japan) M Hirano	11	9	11	4	12	11

Second Round
1	(Japan) M Ito	11	11	11	11
Q16	(Ukraine) M Pesotska	8	8	9	5
10	(Japan) M Kato	10	11	8	7	11	11	8
6	(Japan) H Sato	12	3	11	11	9	6	11
Q2	(Japan) H Hashimoto	11	11	10	2	16	11	11
14	(Germany) Han Y	9	6	12	11	18	5	13
Q1	(India) M Batra	9	1	7	7
4	(Japan) M Hirano	11	11	11	11

Quarterfinals
1	(Japan) M Ito	9	7	11	11	11	11
6	(Japan) H Sato	11	11	6	8	1	2
14	(Germany) Han Y	4	11	11	9	8	11	11
4	(Japan) M Hirano	11	9	9	11	11	5	9

Semifinals
1	(Japan) M Ito	11	11	10	11	11
14	(Germany) Han Y	7	9	12	7	4

=== Bottom half ===
First Round
3	(Chinese Taipei) Cheng I-c	11	11	11	11
Q4	(Thailand) S Sawettabut	7	5	6	8
Q3	(Germany) Shan XN	11	7	11	5	10	11	11
15	(Romania) E Samara	9	11	4	11	12	9	9
13	(Hong Kong) M Soo W Y	11	7	11	8	4	11	11
Q13	(Japan) S Shibata	4	11	6	11	11	6	4
Q6	(Monaco) Yang XX	11	11	4	10	11	9	9
5	(Hong Kong) Doo H K	5	8	11	12	5	11	11
8	(Germany) P Solja	3	8	5	11	11	4
Q9	(Germany) N Mittelham	11	11	11	3	4	11
Q14	(Netherlands) B Eerland	11	11	11	11
16	(Hungary) D Madarász	3	3	7	6
9	(Puerto Rico) A Díaz	8	11	6	11	11	11
Q8	(Japan) M Nagasaki	11	9	11	8	6	9
Q15	(Japan) H Ojio	6	6	9	7
2	(Japan) K Ishikawa	11	11	11	11

Second Round
3	(Chinese Taipei) Cheng I-c	11	11	11	11
Q3	(Germany) Shan XN	3	8	6	5
13	(Hong Kong) M Soo W Y	3	11	11	9	8	14	9
5	(Hong Kong) Doo H K	11	8	5	11	11	12	11
Q9	(Germany) N Mittelham	3	11	10	11	11	11
Q14	(Netherlands) B Eerland	11	6	12	5	9	8
9	(Puerto Rico) A Díaz	5	9	12	11	10
2	(Japan) K Ishikawa	11	11	14	7	12

Quarterfinals
3	(Chinese Taipei) Cheng I-c	11	12	13	11
5	(Hong Kong) Doo H K	8	10	11	4
Q9	(Germany) N Mittelham	3	6	3	7
2	(Japan) K Ishikawa	11	11	11	11

Semifinals
3	(Chinese Taipei) Cheng I-c	9	11	11	10	11	10	11
2	(Japan) K Ishikawa	11	4	9	12	7	12	7

=== Finals ===
Semifinals									Final
1	(Japan) Mima Ito	11	11	10	11	11
14	(Germany) Han Ying	7	9	12	7	4			1	(Japan) Mima Ito	11	1	11	7	2	11	11
3	(Chinese Taipei) Cheng I-ching	9	11	11	10	11	10	11	3	(Chinese Taipei) Cheng I-ching	7	11	6	11	11	9	7
2	(Japan) Kasumi Ishikawa	11	4	9	12	7	12	7

== Men's doubles ==
=== Seeds ===
1. (Hong Kong) Ho Kwan Kit / Wong Chun Ting (semifinals)
2. (Germany) Benedikt Duda / Patrick Franziska (champions)
3. (Chinese Taipei) Chen Chien-an / Chuang Chih-yuan (quarterfinals)
4. (Hungary) Nandor Ecseki / Adam Szudi (quarterfinals)
5. (Belgium) Martin Allegro / Florent Lambiet (first round)
6. (Poland) Jakub Dyjas / (Belgium) Cedric Nuytinck (semifinals)
7. (Japan) Shunsuke Togami / Yukiya Uda (first round)
8. (Hong Kong) Lam Siu Hang / Ng Pak Nam (quarterfinals)

=== Draw ===
First Round
1	(Hong Kong) Ho Kwan Kit (Hong Kong) Wong Chun Ting	11	11	11
Q8	(Romania) Cristian Pletea (Romania) Rares Sipos	8	7	8
Q3	(India) Hameet Desai (India) Manav Vikash Thakkar	11	8	13	11	2
8	(Hong Kong) Lam Siu Hang (Hong Kong) Ng Pak Nam	13	11	11	6	11
7	(Japan) Shunsuke Togami (Japan) Yukiya Uda	6	8	11	11	9
Q1	(India) Sharath Kamal (India) Sathiyan Gnanasekaran	11	11	8	9	11
Q2	(Sweden) Anton Källberg (Sweden) Elias Ranefur	5	15	12	10
4	(Hungary) Nandor Ecseki (Hungary) Adam Szudi	11	13	14	12
3	(Chinese Taipei) Chen Chien-an (Chinese Taipei) Chuang Chih-yuan	5	11	12	11
Q5	(Argentina) Gastón Alto (Puerto Rico) Daniel González	11	6	10	4
Q7	(Serbia) Aleksandar Karakašević (Slovakia) Ľubomír Pištej	12	12	5
6	(Poland) Jakub Dyjas (Belgium) Cedric Nuytinck	14	14	11
5	(Belgium) Martin Allegro (Belgium) Florent Lambiet	10	9	8
Q4	(Brazil) Vitor Ishiy (Brazil) Eric Jouti	12	11	11
Q6	(Czech Republic) Tomáš Polanský (Czech Republic) Pavel Širůček	11	6	4	9
2	(Germany) Benedikt Duda (Germany) Patrick Franziska	6	11	11	11

Quarterfinals
1	(Hong Kong) Ho Kwan Kit (Hong Kong) Wong Chun Ting	11	7	11	12
8	(Hong Kong) Lam Siu Hang (Hong Kong) Ng Pak Nam	7	11	7	10
Q1	(India) Sharath Kamal (India) Sathiyan Gnanasekaran	11	11	11
4	(Hungary) Nandor Ecseki (Hungary) Adam Szudi	8	7	8
3	(Chinese Taipei) Chen Chien-an (Chinese Taipei) Chuang Chih-yuan	8	11	10	11	5
6	(Poland) Jakub Dyjas (Belgium) Cedric Nuytinck	11	5	12	8	11
Q4	(Brazil) Vitor Ishiy (Brazil) Eric Jouti	6	6	5
2	(Germany) Benedikt Duda (Germany) Patrick Franziska	11	11	11

Semifinals
1	(Hong Kong) Ho Kwan Kit (Hong Kong) Wong Chun Ting	7	10	11	11	9
Q1	(India) Sharath Kamal (India) Sathiyan Gnanasekaran	11	12	4	4	11
6	(Poland) Jakub Dyjas (Belgium) Cedric Nuytinck	4	5	11	3
2	(Germany) Benedikt Duda (Germany) Patrick Franziska	11	11	8	11

Final
Q1	(India) Sharath Kamal (India) Sathiyan Gnanasekaran	5	9	11	9
2	(Germany) Benedikt Duda (Germany) Patrick Franziska	11	11	8	11

== Women's doubles ==
=== Seeds ===
1. (Chinese Taipei) Chen Szu-yu / Cheng Hsien-tzu (quarterfinals)
2. (Hong Kong) Doo Hoi Kem / Lee Ho Ching (final)
3. (Slovakia) Barbora Balážová / (Czech Republic) Hana Matelová (first round)
4. (Japan) Miu Hirano / Kasumi Ishikawa (champions)
5. (Hungary) Dóra Madarász / Szandra Pergel (first round)
6. (Thailand) Orawan Paranang / Suthasini Sawettabut (semifinals)
7. (Puerto Rico) Adriana Díaz / Melanie Díaz (first round)
8. (Hong Kong) Minnie Soo Wai Yam / Zhu Chengzhu (semifinals)

=== Draw ===
First Round
1	(Chinese Taipei) Chen Szu-yu (Chinese Taipei) Cheng Hsien-tzu	11	11	11	11
Q6	(Chinese Taipei) Huang Yu-wen (Chinese Taipei) Li Yu-jhun	13	7	8	8
Q4	(Brazil) Caroline Kumahara (United States) Lily Zhang	12	6	11	10
6	(Thailand) Orawan Paranang (Thailand) Suthasini Sawettabut	14	11	9	12
5	(Hungary) Dóra Madarász (Hungary) Szandra Pergel	6	11	11	11	8
Q3	(Portugal) Shao Jieni (Portugal) Fu Yu	11	9	13	7	11
Q2	(Egypt) Dina Meshref (Greece) Aikaterini Toliou	9	5	10
4	(Japan) Miu Hirano (Japan) Kasumi Ishikawa	11	11	11
3	(Slovakia) Barbora Balážová (Czech Republic) Hana Matelová	3	11	11	13	8
Q8	(Germany) Chantal Mantz (Germany) Wan Yuan	11	5	5	15	11
Q5	(Germany) Nina Mittelham (Germany) Shan Xiaona	4	11	8	5
8	(Hong Kong) Minnie Soo Wai Yam (Hong Kong) Zhu Chengzhu	11	9	11	11
7	(Puerto Rico) Adriana Díaz (Puerto Rico) Melanie Díaz	13	8	7
Q7	(England) Tin-Tin Ho (Austria) Karoline Mischek	15	11	11
Q1	(Romania) Irina Ciobanu (Romania) Elizabeta Samara	4	5	13	8
2	(Hong Kong) Doo Hoi Kem (Hong Kong) Lee Ho Ching	11	11	11	11

Quarterfinals
1	(Chinese Taipei) Chen Szu-yu (Chinese Taipei) Cheng Hsien-tzu	1	1	12	11
6	(Thailand) Orawan Paranang (Thailand) Suthasini Sawettabut	11	11	10	13
Q3	(Portugal) Shao Jieni (Portugal) Fu Yu	11	7	12	5
4	(Japan) Miu Hirano (Japan) Kasumi Ishikawa	9	11	14	11
Q8	(Germany) Chantal Mantz (Germany) Wan Yuan	6	13	9	7
8	(Hong Kong) Minnie Soo Wai Yam (Hong Kong) Zhu Chengzhu	11	11	11	11
Q7	(England) Tin-Tin Ho (Austria) Karoline Mischek	11	6	1	5
2	(Hong Kong) Doo Hoi Kem (Hong Kong) Lee Ho Ching	4	11	11	11

Semifinals
6	(Thailand) Orawan Paranang (Thailand) Suthasini Sawettabut	6	14	3	9
4	(Japan) Miu Hirano (Japan) Kasumi Ishikawa	11	12	11	11
8	(Hong Kong) Minnie Soo Wai Yam (Hong Kong) Zhu Chengzhu	10	6	7
2	(Hong Kong) Doo Hoi Kem (Hong Kong) Lee Ho Ching	11	11	11

Final
4	(Japan) Miu Hirano (Japan) Kasumi Ishikawa	11	11	12
2	(Hong Kong) Doo Hoi Kem (Hong Kong) Lee Ho Ching	6	9	10

== Mixed doubles ==
=== Seeds ===
1. (Hong Kong) Wong Chun Ting / Doo Hoi Kem (champions)
2. (Japan) Jun Mizutani / Mima Ito (quarterfinals)
3. (Slovakia) Ľubomír Pištej / Barbora Balážová (first round)
4. (Hong Kong) Ho Kwan Kit / Lee Ho Ching (quarterfinals)
5. (Hungary) Adam Szudi / Szandra Pergel (first round)
6. (France) Tristan Flore / Laura Gasnier (first round)
7. (Germany) Patrick Franziska / Petrissa Solja (final)
8. (Romania) Ovidiu Ionescu / Bernadette Szőcs (quarterfinals)

=== Draw ===
First Round
1	(Hong Kong) Wong Chun Ting (Hong Kong) Doo Hoi Kem	11	6	11	12
Q5	(Puerto Rico) Brian Afanador (Puerto Rico) Adriana Díaz	2	11	5	10
Q2	(Serbia) Marko Jevtović (Serbia) Sabina Šurjan	12	7	10	5
8	(Romania) Ovidiu Ionescu (Romania) Bernadette Szőcs	10	11	12	11
6	(France) Tristan Flore (France) Laura Gasnier	10	11	10
Q1	(Serbia) Aleksandar Karakašević (Serbia) Izabela Lupulesku	12	13	12
Q6	(Puerto Rico) Daniel González (Puerto Rico) Melanie Díaz	8	7	3
4	(Hong Kong) Ho Kwan Kit (Hong Kong) Ho Kwan Kit	21	21	21
3	(Slovakia) Ľubomír Pištej (Slovakia) Barbora Balážová	11	6	8	5
Q3	(Spain) Álvaro Robles (Spain) María Xiao	7	11	11	11
Q7	(Brazil) Vitor Ishiy (Brazil) Bruna Takahashi	11	8	4	2
7	(Germany) Patrick Franziska (Germany) Petrissa Solja	9	11	11	11
5	(Hungary) Adam Szudi (Hungary) Szandra Pergel	8	11	11	9	7
Q8	(India) Sharath Kamal (India) Manika Batra	11	9	6	11	11
Q4	(Turkey) İbrahim Gündüz (Turkey) Sibel Altinkaya	11	4	8	8
2	(Japan) Jun Mizutani (Japan) Mima Ito	7	11	11	11

Quarterfinals
1	(Hong Kong) Wong Chun Ting (Hong Kong) Doo Hoi Kem	6	11	11	11
8	(Romania) Ovidiu Ionescu (Romania) Bernadette Szőcs	11	7	7	9
Q1	(Serbia) Aleksandar Karakašević (Serbia) Izabela Lupulesku	11	3	11	5	11'
4	(Hong Kong) Ho Kwan Kit (Hong Kong) Ho Kwan Kit	7	11	9	11	7
Q3	(Spain) Álvaro Robles (Spain) María Xiao	11	8	8	5
7	(Germany) Patrick Franziska (Germany) Petrissa Solja	8	11	11	11
Q8	(India) Sharath Kamal (India) Manika Batra	w	/	o
2	(Japan) Jun Mizutani (Japan) Mima Ito

Semifinals
1	(Hong Kong) Wong Chun Ting (Hong Kong) Doo Hoi Kem	12	11	15
Q1	(Serbia) Aleksandar Karakašević (Serbia) Izabela Lupulesku	10	3	13
7	(Germany) Patrick Franziska (Germany) Petrissa Solja	11	11	11
Q8	(India) Sharath Kamal (India) Manika Batra	6	8	6

Final
1	(Hong Kong) Wong Chun Ting (Hong Kong) Doo Hoi Kem	11	6	11	7	11
7	(Germany) Patrick Franziska (Germany) Petrissa Solja	6	11	9	11	9
