= 2020 Qatar Open (table tennis) =

Tournament details
- Dates: 3 March 2020 – 8 March 2020
- Total prize money: US$400,000
- Venue: Aspire Dome
- Location: Doha, Qatar

Champions
- Men's singles: (China) Fan Zhendong
- Women's singles: (China) Chen Meng
- Men's doubles: (China) Ma Long (China) Xu Xin
- Women's doubles: (China) Wang Manyu (China) Zhu Yuling
- Mixed doubles: (Japan) Jun Mizutani (Japan) Mima Ito

The 2020 Qatar Open is the third event of the 2020 ITTF World Tour. It took place from 3–8 March in Doha, Qatar.

== Men's singles ==
=== Seeds ===
1. (China) Fan Zhendong (champion)
2. (China) Xu Xin (semifinals)
3. (China) Ma Long (second round)
4. (China) Lin Gaoyuan (first round)
5. (Japan) Tomokazu Harimoto (first round)
6. (Brazil) Hugo Calderano (second round)
7. (Sweden) Mattias Falck (second round)
8. (China) Liang Jingkun (quarterfinals)
9. (China) Wang Chuqin (semifinals)
10. (Germany) Patrick Franziska (first round)
11. (Japan) Koki Niwa (second round)
12. (Japan) Jun Mizutani (second round)
13. (Hong Kong) Wong Chun Ting (first round)
14. (France) Simon Gauzy (quarterfinals)
15. (England) Liam Pitchford (final)
16. (Qatar) Ahmad Khalil Al-Mohannadi (first round)

=== Top half ===
First Round
1	(China) Fan ZD	7	11	11	11	7	11	11
(Sweden) A Källberg	11	6	13	5	11	8	3
(China) Xu CH	11	11	11	11
10	(Germany) P Franziska	6	6	5	2
16	(Qatar) A K Al-Mohannadi	7	8	5	2
(Sweden) J Persson	11	11	11	11
(Japan) T Jin	5	3	11	6	9
7	(Sweden) M Falck	11	11	8	11	11
8	(China) Liang JK	11	11	11	11
(Croatia) A Gaćina	8	8	9	9
(Austria) R Gardos	12	7	9	8	8
12	(Japan) J Mizutani	10	11	11	11	11
9	(China) Wang CQ	11	11	13	11
(Portugal) M Freitas	3	5	11	4
(Japan) M Morizono	4	4	8	2
3	(China) Ma L	11	11	11	11

Second Round
1	(China) Fan ZD	11	11	11	11
(China) Xu CH	4	5	9	3
(Sweden) J Persson	11	11	11	10	13
7	(Sweden) M Falck	7	5	3	12	11
8	(China) Liang JK	10	6	10	11	11	11	11
12	(Japan) J Mizutani	12	11	12	4	6	2	8
9	(China) Wang CQ	13	14	4	11	3	13	11
3	(China) Ma L	15	12	11	8	11	11	6

Quarterfinals
1	(China) Fan ZD	11	11	11	6	12
(Sweden) J Persson	9	9	7	11	10
8	(China) Liang JK	5	8	11	11	5	7
9	(China) Wang CQ	11	11	7	9	11	11

Semifinals
1	(China) Fan ZD	7	8	11	14	11	11
9	(China) Wang CQ	11	11	6	12	7	9

=== Bottom half ===
First Round
4	(China) Lin GY	11	8	7	11	5	11	7
(Belarus) V Samsonov	5	11	11	9	11	6	11
(Spain) Á Robles	6	7	11	9	12	9
15	(England) L Pitchford	11	11	8	11	10	11
13	(Hong Kong) Wong C T	12	12	9	9	8
(Japan) Y Uda	10	14	11	11	11
(Chinese Taipei) Chuang C-y	9	8	11	11	11	11
5	(Japan) T Harimoto	11	11	8	9	9	7
6	(Brazil) H Calderano	12	11	11	11
(India) A Anthony	10	4	4	6
(Denmark) J Groth	10	5	6	11	7
14	(France) S Gauzy	12	11	11	9	11
11	(Japan) K Niwa	11	14	11	10	11
(France) E Lebesson	8	12	4	12	6
(Croatia) F Kojic	5	4	7	11	6
2	(China) Xu X	11	11	11	7	11

Second Round
(Belarus) V Samsonov	7	7	11	10	11	16
15	(England) L Pitchford	11	11	6	12	8	18
(Japan) Y Uda	11	5	11	11	9	6	5
(Chinese Taipei) Chuang C-y	9	11	9	7	11	11	11
6	(Brazil) H Calderano	11	8	9	1	8
14	(France) S Gauzy	6	11	11	11	11
11	(Japan) K Niwa	13	5	3	8
2	(China) Xu X	15	11	11	11

Quarterfinals
15	(England) L Pitchford	14	11	11	11
(Chinese Taipei) Chuang C-y	12	8	5	7
14	(France) S Gauzy	11	6	11	8	6	11	7
2	(China) Xu X	6	11	8	11	11	8	11

Semifinals
15	(England) L Pitchford	3	11	11	6	15	11
2	(China) Xu X	11	7	9	11	13	9

=== Finals ===
Semifinals								Final
1	(China) Fan Zhendong	7	8	11	14	11	11
	(China) Wang Chuqin	11	11	6	12	7	9	1	(China) Fan Zhendong	11	11	8	11	6	11
15	(England) Liam Pitchford	3	11	11	6	15	11	15	(England) Liam Pitchford	9	7	11	4	11	7
2	(China) Xu Xin	11	7	9	11	13	9

== Women's singles ==
=== Seeds ===
1. (China) Chen Meng (champion)
2. (China) Sun Yingsha (second round)
3. (Japan) Mima Ito (final)
4. (China) Wang Manyu (semifinals)
5. (China) Zhu Yuling (quarterfinals)
6. (China) Ding Ning (semifinals)
7. (Singapore) Feng Tianwei (quarterfinals)
8. (Japan) Kasumi Ishikawa (second round)
9. (Japan) Miu Hirano (second round)
10. (China) Chen Xingtong (quarterfinals)
11. (China) Wang Yidi (quarterfinals)
12. (Austria) Sofia Polcanova (second round)
13. (Hong Kong) Doo Hoi Kem (first round)
14. (Japan) Hitomi Sato (second round)
15. (China) He Zhuojia (first round)
16. (Qatar) Maha Faramarzi (first round)

=== Top half ===
First Round
1	(China) Chen M	13	11	11	11
(Japan) H Hashimoto	11	9	8	4
(Spain) G Dvorak	7	11	6	7	6
12	(Austria) S Polcanova	11	7	11	11	11
11	(China) Wang YD	11	11	11	6	14
(China) Zhang R	8	4	7	11	12
(Japan) M Kato	13	11	9	10	4
8	(Japan) K Ishikawa	11	13	11	12	11
5	(China) Zhu YL	11	11	11	11
(Singapore) Zeng J	7	9	8	5
(Japan) S Mori	11	11	11	11
16	(Qatar) M Faramarzi	1	1	2	1
13	(Hong Kong) Doo H K	8	7	10	10
(China) Qian TY	11	11	12	12
(China) Sun MY	8	10	4	5
4	(China) Wang MY	11	11	11	11

Second Round
1	(China) Chen M	11	11	11	11
12	(Austria) S Polcanova	7	6	2	7
11	(China) Wang YD	11	8	11	11	8	12
8	(Japan) K Ishikawa	3	11	7	6	11	10
5	(China) Zhu YL	11	11	11	11
(Japan) S Mori	4	7	6	9
(China) Qian TY	5	7	8	8
4	(China) Wang MY	11	11	11	11

Quarterfinals
1	(China) Chen M	11	11	13	11	11
11	(China) Wang YD	5	8	15	6	6
5	(China) Zhu YL	3	3	15	11	9	10
4	(China) Wang MY	11	11	13	9	11	12

Semifinals
1	(China) Chen M	10	11	11	11	11	11
4	(China) Wang MY	12	7	9	13	5	4

=== Bottom half ===
First Round
3	(Japan) M Ito	9	11	11	12	11
(China) Gu YT	11	5	7	10	4
(Romania) E Samara	11	8	7	7	15	5
14	(Japan) H Sato	7	11	11	11	13	11
15	(China) He ZJ	8	7	9	11	5
(Germany) Shan XN	11	11	11	5	11
(Singapore) Yu MY	5	8	7	2
7	(Singapore) Feng TW	11	11	11	11
6	(China) Ding N	11	11	12	11
(Monaco) Yang XX	8	8	10	6
(Japan) M Nagasaki	5	11	8	9	4
9	(Japan) M Hirano	11	9	11	11	11
10	(China) Chen XT	11	4	9	11	15	3	11
(Hong Kong) Lee H C	4	11	11	8	13	11	5
(Japan) M Kihara	11	2	8	7
2	(China) Sun YS	13	11	11	11

Second Round
3	(Japan) M Ito	11	11	11	10	11
14	(Japan) H Sato	7	4	5	12	7
(Germany) Shan XN	7	7	6	8
7	(Singapore) Feng TW	11	11	11	11
6	(China) Ding N	11	12	11	11
9	(Japan) M Hirano	4	10	8	7
10	(China) Chen XT	11	11	11	11
2	(China) Sun YS	9	7	7	4

Quarterfinals
3	(Japan) M Ito	11	11	12	5	11	11
7	(Singapore) Feng TW	6	7	14	11	5	7
6	(China) Ding N	11	11	11	11
10	(China) Chen XT	6	4	8	1

Semifinals
3	(Japan) M Ito	11	14	11	11
6	(China) Ding N	6	12	0	5

=== Finals ===
Semifinals								Final
1	(China) Chen Meng	10	11	11	11	11	11
4	(China) Wang Manyu	12	7	9	13	5	4	1	(China) Chen Meng	3	11	11	11	11
3	(Japan) Mima Ito	11	14	11	11			3	(Japan) Mima Ito	11	7	9	7	7
6	(China) Ding Ning	6	12	0	5

== Men's doubles ==
=== Seeds ===
1. (China) Ma Long / Xu Xin (champions)
2. (Hong Kong) Ho Kwan Kit / Wong Chun Ting (semifinals)
3. (China) Fan Zhendong / Wang Chuqin (semifinals)
4. (Poland) Jakub Dyjas / (Belgium) Cedric Nuytinck (first round)
5. (Belgium) Martin Allegro / Florent Lambiet (first round)
6. (Japan) Shunsuke Togami / Yukiya Uda (quarterfinals)
7. (France) Tristan Flore / Emmanuel Lebesson (quarterfinals)
8. (Qatar) Mohammed Abdulwahhab / Ahmad Khalil Al-Mohannadi (first round)

=== Draw ===
First Round
1	(China) Ma Long (China) Xu Xin	11	11	11
(Sweden) Anton Källberg (Sweden) Jon Persson	5	4	5
(Japan) Tomokazu Harimoto (Japan) Masataka Morizono	12	11	11
5	(Belgium) Martin Allegro (Belgium) Florent Lambiet	10	8	9
7	(France) Tristan Flore (France) Emmanuel Lebesson	11	9	11	8	11
(Sweden) Kristian Karlsson (Sweden) Truls Möregård	7	11	8	11	6
(Serbia) Aleksandar Karakašević (Slovakia) Ľubomír Pištej	6	3	1
3	(China) Fan Zhendong (China) Wang Chuqin	11	11	11
4	(Poland) Jakub Dyjas (Belgium) Cedric Nuytinck
(Hong Kong) Lam Siu Hang (Hong Kong) Ng Pak Nam	w	/	o
(England) Paul Drinkhall (England) Liam Pitchford	11	11	11
8	(Qatar) Mohammed Abdulwahhab (Qatar) Ahmad Khalil Al-Mohannadi	5	6	4
6	(Japan) Shunsuke Togami (Japan) Yukiya Uda	11	11	9	11
(France) Can Akkuzu (France) Alexandre Cassin	9	9	11	1
(India) Anthony Amalraj (India) Sathiyan Gnanasekaran	9	3	4
2	(Hong Kong) Ho Kwan Kit (Hong Kong) Wong Chun Ting	11	11	11

Quarterfinals
1	(China) Ma Long (China) Xu Xin	11	6	11	12	11
(Japan) Tomokazu Harimoto (Japan) Masataka Morizono	6	11	7	14	7
7	(France) Tristan Flore (France) Emmanuel Lebesson	11	2	5	6
3	(China) Fan Zhendong (China) Wang Chuqin	8	11	11	11
(Hong Kong) Lam Siu Hang (Hong Kong) Ng Pak Nam	7	7	11	5
(England) Paul Drinkhall (England) Liam Pitchford	11	11	9	11
6	(Japan) Shunsuke Togami (Japan) Yukiya Uda	5	11	11	5	5
2	(Hong Kong) Ho Kwan Kit (Hong Kong) Wong Chun Ting	11	2	8	11	11

Semifinals
1	(China) Ma Long (China) Xu Xin	11	11	11
3	(China) Fan Zhendong (China) Wang Chuqin	6	9	9
(England) Paul Drinkhall (England) Liam Pitchford	11	12	4	9	11
2	(Hong Kong) Ho Kwan Kit (Hong Kong) Wong Chun Ting	7	10	11	11	7

Final
1	(China) Ma Long (China) Xu Xin	11	8	11	11
(England) Paul Drinkhall (England) Liam Pitchford	8	11	1	6

== Women's doubles ==
=== Seeds ===
1. (Japan) Miyuu Kihara / Miyu Nagasaki (final)
2. (China) Wang Manyu / Zhu Yuling (champions)
3. (China) Chen Meng / Ding Ning (quarterfinals)
4. (Japan) Miu Hirano / Kasumi Ishikawa (semifinals)
5. (Hong Kong) Doo Hoi Kem / Lee Ho Ching (first round)
6. (Slovakia) Barbora Balážová / (Czech Republic) Hana Matelová (quarterfinals)
7. (Poland) Natalia Bajor / Natalia Partyka (first round)
8. (Qatar) Maha Faramarzi / Kholoud Hussain (first round)

=== Draw ===
First Round
1	(Japan) Miyuu Kihara (Japan) Miyu Nagasaki	11	11	11
(Serbia) Izabela Lupulesku (Serbia) Sabina Šurjan	2	7	7
(Hong Kong) Minnie Soo Wai Yam (Hong Kong) Zhu Chengzhu	11	11	11
8	(Qatar) Maha Faramarzi (Qatar) Kholoud Hussain	3	4	2
7	(Poland) Natalia Bajor (Poland) Natalia Partyka	15	8	9	12
(Singapore) Lin Ye (Singapore) Yu Mengyu	13	11	11	14
(Denmark) Stefanie Christensen (Belgium) Nathalie Marchetti	4	6	4
3	(China) Chen Meng (China) Ding Ning	11	11	11
4	(Japan) Miu Hirano (Japan) Kasumi Ishikawa	11	11	11
(Belarus) Nadezhda Bogdanova (Belarus) Daria Trigolos	6	9	0
(France) Stephanie Loeuillette (France) Yuan Jia Nan	8	11	3	12	11
5	(Hong Kong) Doo Hoi Kem (Hong Kong) Lee Ho Ching	11	6	11	10	7
6	(Slovakia) Barbora Balážová (Czech Republic) Hana Matelová	11	7	7	11	11
(Germany) Nina Mittelham (Germany) Shan Xiaona	6	11	11	8	7
(Italy) Giorgia Piccolin (Italy) Debora Vivarelli
2	(China) Wang Manyu (China) Zhu Yuling	w	/	o

Quarterfinals
1	(Japan) Miyuu Kihara (Japan) Miyu Nagasaki	11	11	11
(Hong Kong) Minnie Soo Wai Yam (Hong Kong) Zhu Chengzhu	7	7	6
(Singapore) Lin Ye (Singapore) Yu Mengyu	11	4	8	12	11
3	(China) Chen Meng (China) Ding Ning	9	11	11	10	5
4	(Japan) Miu Hirano (Japan) Kasumi Ishikawa	w	/	o
(France) Stephanie Loeuillette (France) Yuan Jia Nan
6	(Slovakia) Barbora Balážová (Czech Republic) Hana Matelová	4	5	4
2	(China) Wang Manyu (China) Zhu Yuling	11	11	11

Semifinals
1	(Japan) Miyuu Kihara (Japan) Miyu Nagasaki	11	14	8	12
(Singapore) Lin Ye (Singapore) Yu Mengyu	3	12	11	10
4	(Japan) Miu Hirano (Japan) Kasumi Ishikawa	8	11	9	11	8
2	(China) Wang Manyu (China) Zhu Yuling	11	6	11	4	11

Final
1	(Japan) Miyuu Kihara (Japan) Miyu Nagasaki	4	11	8	9
2	(China) Wang Manyu (China) Zhu Yuling	11	7	11	11

== Mixed doubles ==
=== Seeds ===
1. (Japan) Jun Mizutani / Mima Ito (champions)
2. (Hong Kong) Wong Chun Ting / Doo Hoi Kem (first round)
3. (Slovakia) Ľubomír Pištej / Barbora Balážová (first round)
4. (Hong Kong) Ho Kwan Kit / Lee Ho Ching (semifinals)
5. (Austria) Stefan Fegerl / Sofia Polcanova (quarterfinals)
6. (Germany) Patrick Franziska / Petrissa Solja (first round)
7. (France) Tristan Flore / Laura Gasnier (first round)
8. (Qatar) Mohammed Abdulwahhab / Maha Faramarzi (first round)

=== Draw ===
First Round
1	(Japan) Jun Mizutani (Japan) Mima Ito	11	11	11
(Serbia) Marko Jevtović (Serbia) Sabina Šurjan	5	5	7
(Romania) Ovidiu Ionescu (Romania) Bernadette Szőcs	11	13	9	9	11
6	(Germany) Patrick Franziska (Germany) Petrissa Solja	8	11	11	11	6
5	(Austria) Stefan Fegerl (Austria) Sofia Polcanova	11	11	11
(Serbia) Aleksandar Karakašević (Serbia) Izabela Lupulesku	6	6	6
(Uzbekistan) Zokhid Kenjaev (Uzbekistan) Rimma Gufranova	5	8	2
4	(Hong Kong) Ho Kwan Kit (Hong Kong) Lee Ho Ching	11	11	11
3	(Slovakia) Ľubimir Pištej (Slovakia) Barbora Balážová	8	11	11	8
(France) Emmanuel Lebesson (France) Yuan Jia Nan	11	13	9	11
(Spain) Álvaro Robles (Spain) María Xiao	11	11	11
8	(Qatar) Mohammed Abdulwahhab (Qatar) Maha Faramarzi	7	3	7
7	(France) Tristan Flore (France) Laura Gasnier	7	8	4
(Hungary) Adam Szudi (Hungary) Szandra Pergel	11	11	11
(China) Wang Chuqin (China) Sun Yingsha	11	14	11
2	(Hong Kong) Wong Chun Ting (Hong Kong) Doo Hoi Kem	9	12	7

Quarterfinals
1	(Japan) Jun Mizutani (Japan) Mima Ito	11	12	11
(Romania) Ovidiu Ionescu (Romania) Bernadette Szőcs	8	10	6
5	(Austria) Stefan Fegerl (Austria) Sofia Polcanova	11	5	11	7	6
4	(Hong Kong) Ho Kwan Kit (Hong Kong) Lee Ho Ching	8	11	8	11	11
(France) Emmanuel Lebesson (France) Yuan Jia Nan	10	11	11	9	12
(Spain) Álvaro Robles (Spain) María Xiao	12	8	8	11	14
(Hungary) Adam Szudi (Hungary) Szandra Pergel	5	5	5
(China) Wang Chuqin (China) Sun Yingsha	11	11	11

Semifinals
1	(Japan) Jun Mizutani (Japan) Mima Ito	11	11	11
4	(Hong Kong) Ho Kwan Kit (Hong Kong) Lee Ho Ching	7	6	5
(Spain) Álvaro Robles (Spain) María Xiao	6	4	5
(China) Wang Chuqin (China) Sun Yingsha	11	11	11

Final
1	(Japan) Jun Mizutani (Japan) Mima Ito	11	7	11	15
(China) Wang Chuqin (China) Sun Yingsha	8	11	4	13
