= Kholoud Hussain =

Qatari table tennis player (born 1996)

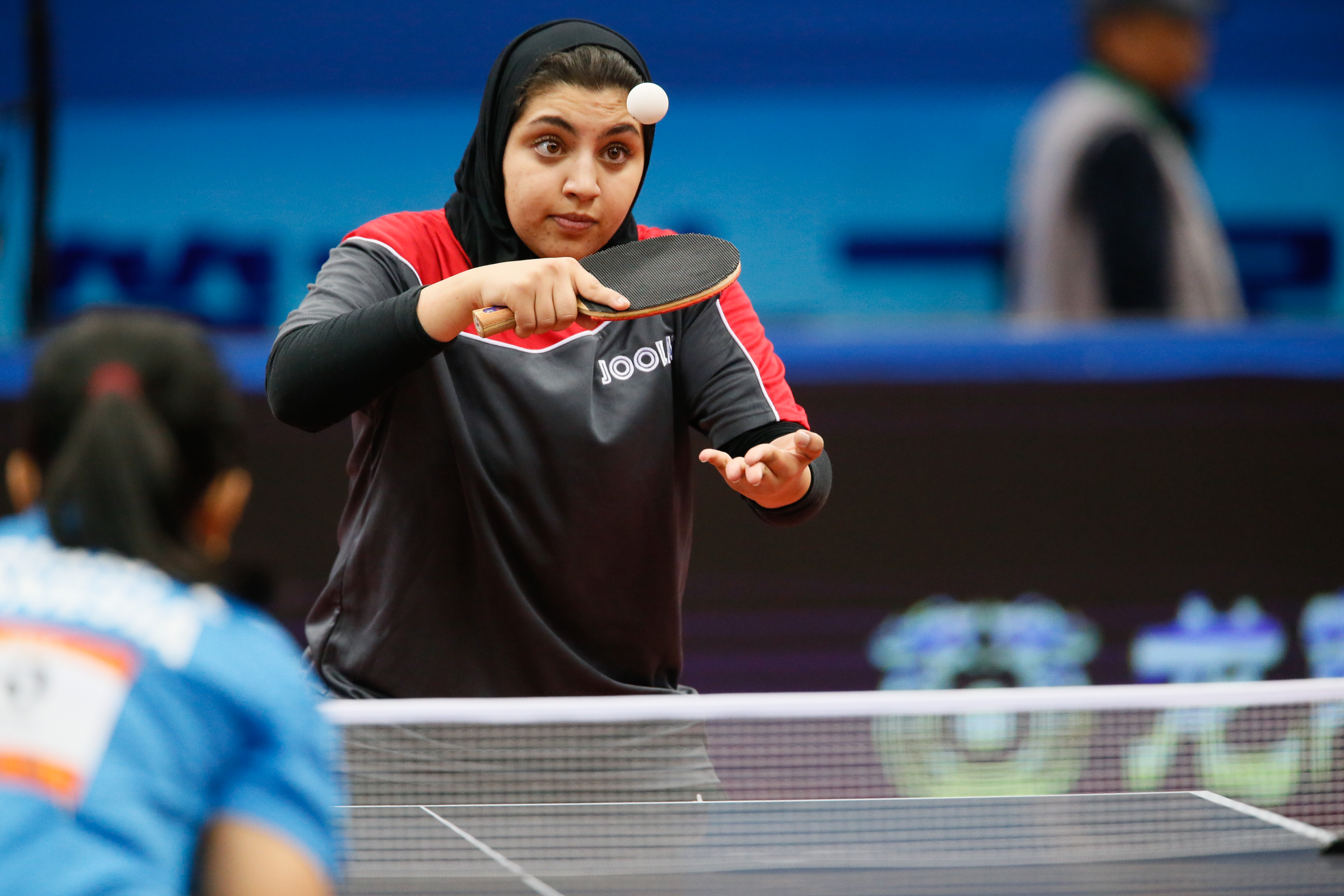
- Hussain in 2017

Personal information
- Born: 9 October 1996 (age 29) Qatar

Sport
- Sport: Table tennis
- Playing style: attack

Kholoud Hussain (Arabic: خلود حسين, romanized: Khulūd Ḥusayn; born 9 October 1996) is a Qatari table tennis player. She won bronze at the 16th Arab Table Tennis Cup.

== Biography ==
Hussain was born on 9 October 1996 in Qatar. She is a table tennis player who plays with an attack style and shakehand grip.

In 2013, Hussain competed at the 2013 Asian Table Tennis Championships in the women's singles event. She beat Liu Yu-Hsin in the first round and was eliminated by Yang Ha-eun in the second round.

In 2014, Hussain competed at the 2014 International Table Tennis Federation (ITTF) World Tour Qatar Open women's event, hosted by the Qatar Table Tennis Association (QTTA).

In April 2017, Hussain competed at the Women's Asian Championships and was defeated by En Hui Tan of Singapore (3-0). In August 2017, she competed at the 16th Arab Table Tennis Cup in Muscat, Oman, and won bronze in the women's event after defeating Maha Ali (4-1).

In March 2018, she competed at the 2018 Qatar Open in the Women's Doubles with Ali Maha, and in the Women's Singles against Sawettabut Suthasini and Maeda Miyu. In March 2020, she competed at the 2020 Qatar Open in the Women's Doubles with Maha Faramarzi, and in the Women's Singles against Daria Trigolos of Belarus.
