= 2013 Asian Table Tennis Championships – Men's team =

The men's team tournament of the 2013 Asian Table Tennis Championships was held from June 30 to July 3, 2013.

China won the final, beating Japan 3–0.

== Medalists ==
Event	Gold	Silver	Bronze
Men's team	China; Zhou Yu; Ma Long; Xu Xin; Yan An; Fan Zhendong	Japan; Jun Mizutani; Koki Niwa; Kazuhiro Chan; Kenta Matsudaira; Seiya Kishikawa	South Korea; Lee Jung-Woo; Seo Hyun-Deok; Jung Young-Sik; Lee Sang-Su; Cho Eon-Rae
Men's team	China; Zhou Yu; Ma Long; Xu Xin; Yan An; Fan Zhendong	Japan; Jun Mizutani; Koki Niwa; Kazuhiro Chan; Kenta Matsudaira; Seiya Kishikawa	Chinese Taipei; Chuang Chih-Yuan; Chen Chien-An; Wu Chih-Chi; Chiang Hung-Chieh; Huang Sheng-Sheng

== Seeds ==
	Team	Players
1	China	Zhou Yu · Ma Long · Xu Xin · Yan An · Fan Zhendong
2	Japan	Jun Mizutani · Koki Niwa · Kazuhiro Chan · Kenta Matsudaira · Seiya Kishikawa
3	Chinese Taipei	Chuang Chih-Yuan · Chen Chien-An · Wu Chih-Chi · Chiang Hung-Chieh · Huang Sheng-Sheng
4	South Korea	Lee Jung-Woo · Seo Hyun-Deok · Jung Young-Sik · Lee Sang-Su · Cho Eon-Rae
5	Hong Kong	Jiang Tianyi · Tang Peng · Cheung Yuk · Wong Chun Ting · Chiu Chung Hei
6	Singapore	Gao Ning · Yang Zi · Pang Xue Jie · Chew Zhe Yu Clarence

== Championship division ==
=== Knockout stage ===
Fifth place
Singapore	3
Hong Kong	2
Seventh place
India	3
Iran	1

Consolation semifinals
India	2
Singapore	3
Hong Kong	3
Iran	1

Quarterfinals
China	3
India	0
Singapore	0
South Korea	3
Chinese Taipei	3
Hong Kong	2
Iran	0
Japan	3

Semifinals
China	3
South Korea	1
Chinese Taipei	2
Japan	3

Final
China	3
Japan	0

==== Quarterfinals ====
30 June 2013; 20:00	Singapore	0–3	South Korea

Report	Individual matches
Gao Ning	1–3	Lee Sang-Su	11-7, 8–11, 9-11, 9-11
Yang Zi	0–3	Seo Hyun-Deok	9–11, 6-11, 9-11
Chew Zhe Yu Clarence	1–3	Jung Young-Sik	3–11, 5-11, 11-9, 6-11

1 July 2013; 10:00	Hong Kong	2–3	Chinese Taipei

Report	Individual matches
Tang Peng	1–3	Chuang Chih-Yuan	11-3, 10–12, 7-11, 5-11
Jiang Tianyi	3–1	Chen Chien-An	12-10, 11-5, 10-12, 11-2
Wong Chun Ting	1–3	Huang Sheng-Sheng	11-7, 8-11, 8-11, 9-11
Tang Peng	3–0	Chen Chien-An	11-4, 11-8, 11-3
Jiang Tianyi	2–3	Chuang Chih-Yuan	4-11, 11-8, 11-8, 9-11, 8-11

1 July 2013; 16:00	Japan	3–0	Iran

Report	Individual matches
Jun Mizutani	3–1	Mohammadreza Akhlaghpasand	11-8, 11–4, 8-11, 11–7
Kenta Matsudaira	3–0	Noshad Alamian	11–8, 11–4, 11–8
Seiya Kishikawa	3–0	Nima Alamian	11–9, 11–5, 11–6

1 July 2013; 20:00	China	3–0	India

Report	Individual matches
Ma Long	3–0	Soumyajit Ghosh	11-4, 11–6, 11–5
Fan Zhendong	3–0	Sharath kamal Achanta	11–7, 11–9, 13–11
Yan An	3–1	Amalraj Anthony	10-12, 11–9, 11–3, 11–7

==== Semifinals ====
2 July 2013; 13:00	China	3–1	South Korea

Report	Individual matches
Ma Long	3–2	Seo Hyun-Deok	9-11, 10-12, 11-4, 12-10, 11-9
Xu Xin	3–0	Lee Sang-Su	11-9, 11-9, 11-4
Yan An	0–3	Jung Young-Sik	8–11, 6-11, 14-16
Ma Long	3–2	Lee Sang-Su	8-11, 11-13, 11-7, 11-4, 11-4

2 July 2013; 15:00	Japan	3–2	Chinese Taipei

Report	Individual matches
Jun Mizutani	3–0	Chen Chien-An	11-7, 11-8, 11-6
Kenta Matsudaira	1–3	Chuang Chih-Yuan	6-11, 6-11, 11-9, 9-11
Seiya Kishikawa	3–2	Chiang Hung-Chieh	10-12, 6-11, 11-5, 14-12, 12-10
Jun Mizutani	1–3	Chuang Chih-Yuan	9-11, 6-11, 11-7, 12-14
Kenta Matsudaira	3–2	Chen Chien-An	11-6, 11-9, 7-11, 8-11, 11-6

==== Final ====
3 July 2013; 18:00	China	3–0	Japan

Report	Individual matches
Xu Xin	3–1	Jun Mizutani	13-11, 11-3, 6-11, 11-5
Ma Long	3–0	Kenta Matsudaira	11-7, 11-4, 11-6
Fan Zhendong	3–2	Seiya Kishikawa	13-11, 11-8, 9-11, 10-12, 11-2
