= Hungarian Open (table tennis) =

Tournament information
- Tour: ITTF World Tour
- Founded: 2010
- Location: Budapest (since 2015)
- Venue: Budapest Olympic Hall (since 2018)
- Category: World Tour
- Draw: 32S / 16D
- Prize money: US$170,000 (2019)

Current champions (2020)
- Men's singles: (Japan) Tomokazu Harimoto
- Women's singles: (Japan) Mima Ito
- Men's doubles: (Germany) Benedikt Duda (Germany) Patrick Franziska
- Women's doubles: (Japan) Miu Hirano (Japan) Kasumi Ishikawa

The Hungarian Open is an annual table tennis tournament held in Hungary by the International Table Tennis Federation (ITTF). It is currently part of the ITTF World Tour.

== History ==
The Hungarian Open was first included on the ITTF Pro Tour schedule in 2010. It returned to the schedule in 2012 as part of the rebranded ITTF World Tour, and after not appearing in 2013 the tournament made its second return in 2014 as part of the new third-tier Challenge Series. In 2016, the tournament was promoted to the second-tier Major Series, and in August 2016 it was confirmed that the event would keep its place on the schedule as part of the revamped ITTF World Tour in 2017.

== Champions ==
=== 2010–2018 ===
Year	Location	Men's singles	Women's singles	Men's doubles	Women's doubles	Ref.
2010	Budaörs	(Japan) Jun Mizutani	(Hong Kong) Tie Yana	(Japan) Kenta Matsudaira (Japan) Koki Niwa	(Japan) Ai Fukuhara (Japan) Kasumi Ishikawa	
2012	Budapest	(China) Ma Long	(China) Liu Shiwen	(China) Chen Qi (China) Ma Lin	(China) Ding Ning (China) Liu Shiwen	
2014	Szombathely	(Austria) Daniel Habesohn	(Austria) Liu Jia	NOT HELD	NOT HELD	
2015	Budapest	(Hong Kong) Jiang Tianyi	(Japan) Misako Wakamiya	(South Korea) Jeong Sang-eun (South Korea) Lee Sang-su	(Austria) Sofia Polcanova (Austria) Amelie Solja	
2016	Budapest	(Chinese Taipei) Chuang Chih-yuan	(Hong Kong) Tie Yana	(Chinese Taipei) Chuang Chih-yuan (Chinese Taipei) Huang Sheng-sheng	(South Korea) Jeon Ji-hee (South Korea) Yang Ha-eun	
2017	Budapest	(China) Yan An	(China) Chen Xingtong	(China) Fang Bo (China) Zhou Yu	(China) Chen Xingtong (China) Li Jiayi	
2018	Budapest	(China) Fan Zhendong	(China) Wang Manyu	(China) Fan Zhendong (China) Yu Ziyang	(China) Chen Xingtong (China) Sun Yingsha	

=== 2019– ===
Year	Location	Men's singles	Women's singles	Men's doubles	Women's doubles	Mixed doubles	Ref.
2019	Budapest	(China) Lin Gaoyuan	(China) Chen Meng	(China) Liang Jingkun (China) Xu Xin	(China) Wang Manyu (China) Zhu Yuling	(China) Xu Xin (China) Liu Shiwen	
2020	Budapest	(Japan) Tomokazu Harimoto	(Japan) Mima Ito	(Germany) Benedikt Duda (Germany) Patrick Franziska	(Japan) Miu Hirano (Japan) Kasumi Ishikawa	(Hong Kong) Wong Chun Ting (Hong Kong) Doo Hoi Kem	

== See also ==
- European Table Tennis Union
