= Yan An =

Yan An may refer to:

- Yan'an, a city in Shaanxi, China
- Yan An (table tennis) (born 1993), Chinese table tennis player
- Yan An (son of Luzhong)
