= Table tennis at the 2018 Asian Games – Men's singles =

Sporting Event

Men's singles at the 2018 Asian Games
- Venue: Jakarta International Expo
- Date: 30 August – 1 September 2018
- Competitors: 48 from 26 nations

Medalists
gold medal	Fan Zhendong	China
silver medal	Lin Gaoyuan	China
bronze medal	Noshad Alamian	Iran
bronze medal	Lee Sang-su	South Korea

The men's singles table tennis event at the 2018 Asian Games took place from 30 August to 1 September 2018 at the Jakarta International Expo. Seeds were based on the individual ITTF World Ranking lists published in August 2018 with a maximum of 2 players per country.

== Schedule ==
All times are Western Indonesia Time (UTC+07:00)

Date	Time	Event
Thursday, 30 August 2018	10:00	Round of 64
Thursday, 30 August 2018	14:00	Round of 32
Friday, 31 August 2018	11:00	Round of 16
Friday, 31 August 2018	16:00	Quarterfinals
Saturday, 1 September 2018	11:00	Semifinals
Saturday, 1 September 2018	17:00	Final

== Results ==
Legend

- r — Retired
- WO — Won by walkover

=== Finals ===
Quarterfinals
1	Fan Zhendong (CHN)	11	11	11	11
8	Jin Ueda (JPN)	3	3	5	7
5	Chuang Chih-yuan (TPE)	11	9	11	8	7	8
3	Lee Sang-su (KOR)	6	11	9	11	11	11
4	Wong Chun Ting (HKG)	11	8	10	5	8
15	Noshad Alamian (IRI)	6	11	12	11	11
6	Kenta Matsudaira (JPN)	16	3	3	2	12	8
2	Lin Gaoyuan (CHN)	14	11	11	11	10	11

Semifinals
1	Fan Zhendong (CHN)	11	4	11	11	11
3	Lee Sang-su (KOR)	3	11	4	9	5
15	Noshad Alamian (IRI)	10	7	6	2
2	Lin Gaoyuan (CHN)	12	11	11	11

Final
1	Fan Zhendong (CHN)	11	11	15	4	11	11
2	Lin Gaoyuan (CHN)	8	5	17	11	8	6

=== Top half ===
==== Section 1 ====
Round of 64									Round of 32								Round of 16
									1	Fan Zhendong (CHN)	11	11	11	11
	Salahaldin Al-Balooshi (UAE)	6	7	11	7				31	Xiao Zikang (MAC)	5	2	4	6
31	Xiao Zikang (MAC)	11	11	13	11												1	Fan Zhendong (CHN)	11	11	11	11	11
26	Mohamad Hamie (LBN)	8	6	6	13	11	11	3									12	Ho Kwan Kit (HKG)	3	5	4	13	4
	Nguyễn Đức Tuân (VIE)	11	11	11	11	8	6	11		Nguyễn Đức Tuân (VIE)	8	11	2	11	7	7
									12	Ho Kwan Kit (HKG)	11	6	11	9	11	11

==== Section 2 ====
Round of 64						Round of 32							Round of 16
						14	Nima Alamian (IRI)	12	11	11	8	13
	Moosa Munsif Ahmed (MDV)	5	6	4	6	22	Ashraf Haiqal Rizal (MAS)	10	7	4	11	11
22	Ashraf Haiqal Rizal (MAS)	11	11	11	11								14	Nima Alamian (IRI)	15	6	5	7	10
17	Supanut Wisutmaythangkoon (THA)	11	11	16	11								8	Jin Ueda (JPN)	13	11	11	11	12
	Omar Al-Kades (YEM)	6	6	14	7	17	Supanut Wisutmaythangkoon (THA)	9	15	8	5	3
						8	Jin Ueda (JPN)	11	13	11	11	11

==== Section 3 ====
Round of 64									Round of 32						Round of 16
									5	Chuang Chih-yuan (TPE)	11	11	11	11
	Amar Lal Malla (NEP)	8	11	11	8	11	2	5	32	Chinbatyn Erdenebayar (MGL)	6	5	1	3
32	Chinbatyn Erdenebayar (MGL)	11	9	6	11	8	11	11							5	Chuang Chih-yuan (TPE)	11	9	12	14	11	11
28	Bima Abdi Negara (INA)														10	Sharath Kamal (IND)	7	11	10	16	9	9
	Muhammad Asim Qureshi (PAK)	W	O							Muhammad Asim Qureshi (PAK)	4	8	7	5
									10	Sharath Kamal (IND)	11	11	11	11

==== Section 4 ====
Round of 64							Round of 32								Round of 16
							16	Pak Sin-hyok (PRK)	6	11	11	8	11	11
	Talgat Sagyndykov (KGZ)	4	11	3	4	3	29	Abdulrahman Al-Naggar (QAT)	11	3	8	11	4	8
29	Abdulrahman Al-Naggar (QAT)	11	8	11	11	11									16	Pak Sin-hyok (PRK)	11	4	9	6	11	10
24	Imesh Ranasinghe (SRI)	12	11	r											3	Lee Sang-su (KOR)	9	11	11	11	9	12
	Sonpasith Mosangsinh (LAO)	14	8					Sonpasith Mosangsinh (LAO)	1	8	5	5
							3	Lee Sang-su (KOR)	11	11	11	11

=== Bottom half ===
==== Section 5 ====
Round of 64						Round of 32							Round of 16
						4	Wong Chun Ting (HKG)	9	11	11	11	11
	Ebrahim Gubran (YEM)	5	5	8	5	27	Jann Mari Nayre (PHI)	11	4	3	4	5
27	Jann Mari Nayre (PHI)	11	11	11	11								4	Wong Chun Ting (HKG)	12	11	8	11	6	11
19	Padasak Tanviriyavechakul (THA)	11	11	11	11								9	Chen Chien-an (TPE)	10	5	11	9	11	5
	Sengarthid Vongdalasinh (LAO)	3	7	5	2	19	Padasak Tanviriyavechakul (THA)	14	9	6	3	10
						9	Chen Chien-an (TPE)	12	11	11	11	12

==== Section 6 ====
Round of 64								Round of 32						Round of 16
								15	Noshad Alamian (IRI)	11	11	11	11
	Abdulla Al-Balooshi (UAE)	4	7	9	6			21	Nguyễn Anh Tú (VIE)	9	8	9	9
21	Nguyễn Anh Tú (VIE)	11	11	11	11									15	Noshad Alamian (IRI)	11	12	3	8	7	13	14
23	Cheong Chi Cheng (MAC)	12	11	11	7	5	11							7	Jeoung Young-sik (KOR)	7	10	11	11	11	11	12
	Santoo Shrestha (NEP)	10	8	9	11	11	8	23	Cheong Chi Cheng (MAC)	7	7	10	8
								7	Jeoung Young-sik (KOR)	11	11	12	11

==== Section 7 ====
Round of 64							Round of 32								Round of 16
							6	Kenta Matsudaira (JPN)	6	12	11	11	11
	Enkhbatyn Lkhagvasüren (MGL)	2	11	1	1	5	18	Choe Il (PRK)	11	10	8	6	5
18	Choe Il (PRK)	11	2	11	11	11									6	Kenta Matsudaira (JPN)	9	11	11	11	12
30	Ficky Supit Santoso (INA)	11	11	11	11										11	Sathiyan Gnanasekaran (IND)	11	4	9	6	10
	Mohamed Shaffan Ismail (MDV)	8	5	7	6		30	Ficky Supit Santoso (INA)	3	11	12	1	11	7
							11	Sathiyan Gnanasekaran (IND)	11	9	14	11	9	11

==== Section 8 ====
Round of 64							Round of 32						Round of 16
							13	Gao Ning (SGP)	11	11	11	11
	Mohammed Abdulhussein (QAT)	11	11	11	8	11		Mohammed Abdulhussein (QAT)	7	4	9	6
25	Muhammad Rameez (PAK)	2	8	8	11	6							13	Gao Ning (SGP)	3	6	12	7	8
20	Leong Chee Feng (MAS)	11	11	11	11								2	Lin Gaoyuan (CHN)	11	11	10	11	11
	Alisher Iakupbaev (KGZ)	7	7	7	1		20	Leong Chee Feng (MAS)	6	6	2	6
							2	Lin Gaoyuan (CHN)	11	11	11	11
