= 2013 Asian Table Tennis Championships – Women's team =

The women's team tournament of the 2013 Asian Table Tennis Championships was held from June 30 to July 2, 2013.

China won the final, beating Hong Kong 3–0.

== Medalists ==
Event	Gold	Silver	Bronze
Women's team	China; Ding Ning; Liu Shiwen; Guo Yue; Zhu Yuling; Chen Meng	Hong Kong; Jiang Huajun; Lee Ho Ching; Guan Mengyuan; Li Ching Wan	Japan; Kasumi Ishikawa; Fukuhara Ai; Sayaka Hirano; Misaki Morizono; Marina Matsuzawa
Women's team	China; Ding Ning; Liu Shiwen; Guo Yue; Zhu Yuling; Chen Meng	Hong Kong; Jiang Huajun; Lee Ho Ching; Guan Mengyuan; Li Ching Wan	Singapore; Feng Tianwei; Yu Mengyu; Li Isabelle Siyun; Yee Herng Hwee

== Seeds ==
	Team	Players
1	China	Ding Ning · Liu Shiwen · Guo Yue · Zhu Yuling · Chen Meng
2	Singapore	Feng Tianwei · Yu Mengyu · Li Isabelle Siyun · Yee Herng Hwee
3	Japan	Kasumi Ishikawa · Fukuhara Ai · Sayaka Hirano · Misaki Morizono · Marina Matsuzawa
4	South Korea	Seok Ha-Jung · Yang Ha-Eun · Seo Hyo-Won · Cho Ha-La · Song Ma-Eum
5	Hong Kong	Jiang Huajun · Lee Ho Ching · Guan Mengyuan · Li Ching Wan
6	Chinese Taipei	Huang Yi-Hua · Cheng I-Ching · Chen Szu-yu · Lee I-Chen · Lin Hsing-Yin

== Championship division ==
=== Knockout stage ===
Fifth place
Chinese Taipei	0
South Korea	3
Seventh place
India	1
Malaysia	3

Consolation semifinals
India	0
Chinese Taipei	3
South Korea	3
Malaysia	0

Quarterfinals
China	3
India	0
Chinese Taipei	0
Japan	3
South Korea	2
Hong Kong	3
Malaysia	0
Singapore	3

Semifinals
China	3
Japan	0
Hong Kong	3
Singapore	2

Final
China	3
Hong Kong	0

==== Quarterfinals ====
30 June 2013; 18:00	Japan	3–0	Chinese Taipei

Report	Individual matches
Fukuhara Ai	3–0	Chen Szu-yu	11-6, 11-6, 11-6
Kasumi Ishikawa	3–1	Cheng I-Ching	11-9, 11-5, 8-11, 13-11
Sayaka Hirano	3–1	Lee I-Chen	9-11, 11-4, 11-4, 11-7

1 July 2013; 12:00	Hong Kong	3–2	South Korea

Report	Individual matches
Jiang Huajun	1–3	Yang Ha-Eun	11-6, 7-11, 6-11, 9-11
Lee Ho Ching	3–0	Seok Ha-Jung	11-6, 11-5, 11-7
Guan Mengyuan	0–3	Seo Hyo-Won	4-11, 3-11, 6-11
Jiang Huajun	3–0	Seok Ha-Jung	11-6, 11-4, 11-8
Lee Ho Ching	3–0	Yang Ha-Eun	11-9, 12-10, 11-8

1 July 2013; 14:00	China	3–0	India

Report	Individual matches
Liu Shiwen	3–1	Mouma Das	11-13, 11-5, 11-6, 11-6
Guo Yue	3–0	Shamini Kumaresan	11-6, 11-5, 11-2
Ding Ning	3–0	Ankita Das	11-3, 11-2, 11-4

1 July 2013; 14:00	Singapore	3–0	Malaysia

Report	Individual matches
Feng Tianwei	3–1	Ng Sock Khim	9-11, 11-4, 11-9, 11-5
Yu Mengyu	3–0	Beh Lee Wei	11-6, 11-5, 11-8
Li Isabelle Siyun	3–2	Ting Hie Phin	11-5,11-8, 7-11, 8-11, 11-9

==== Semifinals ====
1 July 2013; 18:00	Japan	0–3	China

Report	Individual matches
Fukuhara Ai	0–3	Ding Ning	8-11, 8-11, 5-11
Kasumi Ishikawa	1–3	Liu Shiwen	8-11, 11-7, 9-11, 2-11
Sayaka Hirano	0–3	Zhu Yuling	6-11, 2-11, 5-11

1 July 2013; 20:00	Hong Kong	3–2	Singapore

Report	Individual matches
Jiang Huajun	3–1	Yu Mengyu	11-9, 7-11, 11-8, 11-9
Lee Ho Ching	1–3	Feng Tianwei	4-11, 11-7, 2-11, 5-11
Guan Mengyuan	3–2	Li Isabelle Siyun	11-9, 4-11, 9-11, 12-10, 11-7
Jiang Huajun	0–3	Feng Tianwei	10-12, 8-11, 4-11
Lee Ho Ching	3–1	Yu Mengyu	11-3, 12-10, 6-11, 11-3

==== Final ====
2 July 2013; 17:00	China	3–0	Hong Kong

Report	Individual matches
Ding Ning	3–0	Lee Ho Ching	11-7, 11-6, 11-3
Liu Shiwen	3–0	Jiang Huajun	11-6, 11-4, 11-4
Zhu Yuling	3–0	Guan Mengyuan	11-3, 11-2, 11-1
