= 2013 Asian Table Tennis Championships – Men's singles =

== Medalists ==
Event	Gold	Silver	Bronze
Men's singles			

== Seeds ==
Singles matches were best of 7 games in the main draw.

1. (China) Xu Xin
2. (China) Ma Long
3. (Chinese Taipei) Chuang Chih-Yuan
4. (Japan) Jun Mizutani
5. (China) Yan An
6. (Singapore) Gao Ning
7. (Hong Kong) Jiang Tianyi
8. (Japan) Koki Niwa
9. (Japan) Kenta Matsudaira
10. (Japan) Seiya Kishikawa
11. (China) Fan Zhendong
12. (Hong Kong) Tang Peng
13. (Japan) Kazuhiro Chan
14. (China) Zhou Yu
15. (Iran) Noshad Alamiyan
16. (South Korea) Cho Eon-Rae

== Draw ==
=== Finals ===
Quarterfinals

Semifinals

Final

=== Section 1 ===
First Round
(South Korea) Lee Sang-Su	11	11	11	11
(Vietnam) Duong Van Nam	6	7	3	5
(Kazakhstan) Kirill Gerassimenko	11	11	11	11
(Thailand) Suchat Pitakgulsiri	3	9	5	8
(Chinese Taipei) Yang Heng-Wei	w/o
(Uzbekistan) Elmurod Holikov

Second Round
1	(China) Xu Xin	11	11	11	5	11
(South Korea) Lee Sang-Su	8	6	5	11	5
(India) Harmeet Desai	11	11	11	11
(Iran) Hamidreza Taherkhani	6	8	2	7
(Pakistan) Yasir Iqbal Bhatti	5	6	4	11
(Kazakhstan) Kirill Gerassimenko	11	11	11	13
(Chinese Taipei) Yang Heng-Wei	11	6	11	6	9	11	2
10	(Japan) Seiya Kishikawa	4	11	4	11	11	7	11

Third Round
1	(China) Xu Xin	11	11	12	11
(India) Harmeet Desai	5	9	10	1
(Kazakhstan) Kirill Gerassimenko	2	7	9	8
10	(Japan) Seiya Kishikawa	11	11	11	11

Fourth Round
1	(China) Xu Xin
10	(Japan) Seiya Kishikawa

=== Section 2 ===
First Round
(Chinese Taipei) Chang Shun-Hung	11	10	11	11	11
(Sri Lanka) Rohan Sirisena	7	12	7	5	4
(Nepal) Shiva Sundar Gothe	3	2	8	8
(Mongolia) Batkhishig Bilegt	11	11	11	11
(Macau) Che Long Lam	11	9	8	12	6
(Kyrgyzstan) Ruslan Kultaev	8	11	11	14	11

Second Round
12	(Hong Kong) Tang Peng	11	11	11	6	4	11
(Chinese Taipei) Chang Shun-Hung	8	9	6	11	11	8
(Mongolia) Batkhishig Bilegt	13	6	10	7
(United Arab Emirates) Walid Mohammad	15	11	12	11
(Vietnam) Doan Ba Tuan Anh	11	11	11	9	19
(Qatar) Ahmed Alawlaqi	9	8	9	11	17
(Kyrgyzstan) Ruslan Kultaev	3	6	3	2
6	(Singapore) Gao Ning	11	11	11	11

Third Round
12	(Hong Kong) Tang Peng	11	11	11	11
(United Arab Emirates) Walid Mohammad	7	9	7	2
(Vietnam) Doan Ba Tuan Anh	2	6	6	6
6	(Singapore) Gao Ning	11	11	11	11

Fourth Round
12	(Hong Kong) Tang Peng
6	(Singapore) Gao Ning

=== Section 3 ===
First Round
(Nepal) Ranjit singh Rayamahji	9	2	2	3
(Hong Kong) Wong Chun Ting	11	11	11	11
(Thailand) Nikom Wongsiri	11	12	11	11	11	11
(Mongolia) Batkhishig Bilegt	7	14	4	1	13	7
(Uzbekistan) Timur Shiriev	8	4	11	7	5
(Kazakhstan) Timur Kelbuganov	11	11	7	11	11

Second Round
5	(China) Yan An	9	11	11	11	13
(Hong Kong) Wong Chun Ting	11	5	6	9	11
(Macau) Cheong Cheng Wa	6	12	11	11	11	10	11
(Kyrgyzstan) Alisher Iakupbev	11	14	2	8	9	12	8
(South Korea) Kim Dong-Hyun	11	11	11	11
(Thailand) Nikom Wongsiri	3	2	4	9
(Kazakhstan) Timur Kelbuganov	5	3	9	6
15	(Iran) Noshad Alamiyan	11	11	11	11

Third Round
5	(China) Yan An	11	11	11	11
(Macau) Cheong Cheng Wa	4	4	8	6
(South Korea) Kim Dong-Hyun	4	11	15	5	11	10
15	(Iran) Noshad Alamiyan	11	9	17	11	9	12

Fourth Round
5	(China) Yan An
15	(Iran) Noshad Alamiyan
