= 2019 Asian Table Tennis Championships – Men's singles =

Men's singles at the 2019 Asian Table Tennis Championships
- Venue: Among Rogo Sports Hall
- Date: September 19, 2019 – September 22, 2019
- Competitors: 129 from 32 nations

Medalists
| gold medal | Xu Xin | China |
| silver medal | Lin Gaoyuan | China |
| bronze medal | Tomokazu Harimoto | Japan |
| bronze medal | Fan Zhendong | China |

The men's singles in table tennis at the 2019 Asian Table Tennis Championships in Yogyakarta is the twenty-fourth edition of the event in this tournament. It was held at Among Rogo Sports Hall from 19 to 22 September 2019.

== Schedule ==
All times are Indonesia Western Standard Time (UTC+07:00)

| Date | Time | Event |
|---|---|---|
| Thursday, 19 September 2019 | 10:00 | First round |
| Thursday, 19 September 2019 | 13:00 | Second round |
| Thursday, 19 September 2019 | 19:40 | Third round |
| Friday, 20 September 2019 | 10:00 | Fourth round |
| Friday, 20 September 2019 | 16:40 | Fifth round |
| Friday, 20 September 2019 | 19:50 | Quarterfinals |
| Sunday, 22 September 2019 | 14:20 | Semifinals |
| Sunday, 22 September 2019 | 18:00 | Final |

== Draw ==
=== Key ===
- Q = Qualifier
- w/o = Walkover
- w/d = Withdraw
- r = Retired
- DQ = Disqualified

=== Finals ===
Fifth Round
1 | (China) Xu Xin | 7 | 11 | 11 | 11
12 | (Japan) Maharu Yoshimura | 11 | 8 | 2 | 5
19 | (Japan) Takuya Jin | 11 | 7 | 11 | 7 | 5
8 | (South Korea) Lee Sang-su | 9 | 11 | 8 | 11 | 11
5 | (China) Liang Jingkun | 11 | 11 | 6 | 4 | 7
10 | (South Korea) Jeoung Young-sik | 9 | 4 | 11 | 11 | 11
14 | (Chinese Taipei) Chen Chien-an | 5 | 9 | 10
4 | (Japan) Tomokazu Harimoto | 11 | 11 | 12
3 | (China) Lin Gaoyuan | 11 | 11 | 11
16 | (South Korea) An Jae-hyun | 9 | 8 | 9
13 | (India) Sathiyan Gnanasekaran | 11 | 11 | 11
28 | (North Korea) An Ji-song | 7 | 8 | 6
6 | (South Korea) Jang Woo-jin | 10 | 13 | 1 | 11 | 5
9 | (China) Wang Chuqin | 12 | 11 | 11 | 5 | 11
35 | (Chinese Taipei) Liao Cheng-ting | 4 | 5 | 4
2 | (China) Fan Zhendong | 11 | 11 | 11

Quarterfinals
1 | (China) Xu Xin | 11 | 11 | 11
8 | (South Korea) Lee Sang-su | 7 | 6 | 3
10 | (South Korea) Jeoung Young-sik | 8 | 7 | 5
4 | (Japan) Tomokazu Harimoto | 11 | 11 | 11
3 | (China) Lin Gaoyuan | 11 | 11 | 8 | 11
11 | (India) Sathiyan Gnanasekaran | 7 | 5 | 11 | 8
9 | (China) Wang Chuqin | 8 | 10 | 6
2 | (China) Fan Zhendong | 11 | 12 | 11

Semifinals
1 | (China) Xu Xin | 11 | 11 | 11
4 | (Japan) Tomokazu Harimoto | 4 | 9 | 9
3 | (China) Lin Gaoyuan | 11 | 11 | 11
2 | (China) Fan Zhendong | 7 | 6 | 3

Final
1 | (China) Xu Xin | 11 | 6 | 11 | 11
3 | (China) Lin Gaoyuan | 6 | 11 | 2 | 8

=== Top half ===
==== Section 1 ====
First Round
34 | (Chinese Taipei) Wang T-w | 11 | 11 | 11
114 | (Philippines) M J Russel | 4 | 2 | 8

Second Round
1 | (China) Xu X | 11 | 11 | 9 | 13 | 11
34 | (Chinese Taipei) Wang T-w | 8 | 2 | 11 | 15 | 3
60 | (Kuwait) I Al-Hasan | 11 | 10 | 11 | 11
68 | (Turkmenistan) Rav Ahmedov | 2 | 12 | 5 | 1
90 | (Indonesia) S N A Mamonto | 1 | 11 | 9
70 | (United Arab Emirates) A Albalooshi | 11 | 13 | 11
106 | (Malaysia) A Ling Y H | 9 | 11 | 12 | 9
37 | (Iran) A H Hodaei | 11 | 6 | 14 | 11

Third Round
1 | (China) Xu X | 12 | 11 | 11
60 | (Kuwait) I Al-Hasan | 10 | 5 | 5
70 | (United Arab Emirates) A Albalooshi | 6 | 9 | 6
37 | (Iran) A H Hodaei | 11 | 11 | 11

Fourth Round
1 | (China) Xu X | 11 | 11 | 11
37 | (Iran) A H Hodaei | 5 | 5 | 3

==== Section 2 ====
First Round

Second Round
25 | (Hong Kong) Lam S H | 11 | 9 | 11 | 11
86 | (Bahrain) A Alyassi | 9 | 11 | 5 | 2
81 | (Bangladesh) M R Parag | 5 | 10 | 3
48 | (Uzbekistan) K Teshaboev | 11 | 12 | 11
107 | (Mongolia) B Bayasgalan | 8 | 5 | 6
54 | (Singapore) Beh K T | 11 | 11 | 11
118 | (Palestine) H Doufesh | 7 | 5 | 11 | 4
12 | (Japan) M Yoshimura | 11 | 11 | 7 | 11

Third Round
25 | (Hong Kong) Lam S H | 8 | 11 | 11 | 11
48 | (Uzbekistan) K Teshaboev | 11 | 6 | 3 | 4
54 | (Singapore) Beh K T | 5 | 6 | 4
12 | (Japan) M Yoshimura | 11 | 11 | 11

Fourth Round
25 | (Hong Kong) Lam S H | 9 | 3 | 8
12 | (Japan) M Yoshimura | 11 | 11 | 11

==== Section 3 ====
First Round

Second Round
13 | (India) S Kamal | 11 | 11 | 11
83 | (Afghanistan) M Hosseini | 4 | 6 | 5
19 | (Japan) T Jin | 11 | 11 | 11
32 | (Saudi Arabia) A Alkhadrawi | 7 | 5 | 2
122 | (Qatar) A Al-Mohannadi
98 | (Kyrgyzstan) M Akhmedzhanov | w | / | o
121 | (North Korea) Kim O-c | 11 | 11 | 11
125 | (Sri Lanka) S Senura | 1 | 6 | 3

Third Round
13 | (India) S Kamal | 11 | 5 | 11 | 6 | 12
19 | (Japan) T Jin | 4 | 11 | 7 | 11 | 14
98 | (Kyrgyzstan) M Akhmedzhanov | 8 | 7 | 11
121 | (North Korea) Kim O-c | 11 | 11 | 13

Fourth Round
19 | (Japan) T Jin | 11 | 12 | 11
121 | (North Korea) Kim O-c | 8 | 10 | 7

==== Section 4 ====
First Round

Second Round
115 | (Philippines) J Adasa | 13 | 16 | 8 | 11
111 | (Nepal) S Kapali | 11 | 14 | 11 | 7
77 | (Thailand) K Sanpao
102 | (Lebanon) S El-Habach | w | / | o
75 | (Macau) Cheong C Cho | 7 | 11 | 11 | 5 | 11
78 | (Jordan) M Salameh | 11 | 9 | 6 | 11 | 3
97 | (Iraq) A Hameed
8 | (South Korea) Lee S-s | w | / | o

Third Round
115 | (Philippines) J Adasa | 11 | 11 | 11
102 | (Lebanon) S El-Habach | 7 | 5 | 5
75 | (Macau) Cheong C Cho | 5 | 5 | 6
8 | (South Korea) Lee S-s | 11 | 11 | 11

Fourth Round
115 | (Philippines) J Adasa | 6 | 6 | 5
8 | (South Korea) Lee S-s | 11 | 11 | 11

==== Section 5 ====
First Round

Second Round
5 | (China) Liang JK | 11 | 11 | 11
26 | (Chinese Taipei) Hung T-h | 8 | 7 | 8
46 | (Jordan) Z Abo Yaman | 11 | 11 | 11
51 | (Sri Lanka) R Sirisena | 7 | 8 | 6
56 | (Kyrgyzstan) A Aitahunov | 7 | 5 | 6
92 | (Indonesia) R N Niman | 11 | 11 | 11
24 | (Hong Kong) Ho K K | 11 | 11 | 11
89 | (Bahrain) Rashed | 5 | 7 | 9

Third Round
5 | (China) Liang JK | 11 | 11 | 11
46 | (Jordan) Z Abo Yaman | 7 | 5 | 4
92 | (Indonesia) R N Niman | 11 | 2 | 12 | 7
24 | (Hong Kong) Ho K K | 7 | 11 | 14 | 11

Fourth Round
5 | (China) Liang JK | 11 | 9 | 11 | 11
24 | (Hong Kong) Ho K K | 7 | 11 | 1 | 5

==== Section 6 ====
First Round

Second Round
69 | (Turkmenistan) E Garyagdyyev | 3 | 4 | 4
42 | (Singapore) K Pang Y E | 11 | 11 | 11
21 | (Iran) Ni Alamian | w | / | o
95 | (Iraq) M Taher
41 | (North Korea) Ham Y-s | w | / | o
64 | (Mongolia) T Myandal
63 | (Kuwait) J Al-Balhan | 3 | 3 | 5
10 | (South Korea) Jeoung Y-s | 11 | 11 | 11

Third Round
42 | (Singapore) K Pang Y E | 11 | 4 | 8 | 11
21 | (Iran) Ni Alamian | 3 | 11 | 11 | 13
41 | (North Korea) Ham Y-s | 5 | 5 | 8
10 | (South Korea) Jeoung Y-s | 11 | 11 | 11

Fourth Round
21 | (Iran) Ni Alamian | 12 | 5 | 8 | 4
10 | (South Korea) Jeoung Y-s | 10 | 11 | 11 | 11

==== Section 7 ====
First Round

Second Round
14 | (Chinese Taipei) Chen C-a | 11 | 11
52 | (Singapore) J Chua S H | 8 | 3 | 3
84 | (Afghanistan) M Bakhtiyari | 9 | 7 | 11
93 | (Indonesia) H N Annafi | 11 | 11 | 13
128 | (Uzbekistan) J Rakhimberganov | 4 | 6 | 10
101 | (Saudi Arabia) M Alsharif | 11 | 11 | 12
66 | (Nepal) S Shrestha | 7 | 5 | 5
27 | (India) A Anthony | 11 | 11 | 11

Third Round
14 | (Chinese Taipei) Chen C-a | 11 | 11 | 11
93 | (Indonesia) H N Annafi | 6 | 6 | 4
101 | (Saudi Arabia) M Alsharif | 4 | 5 | 4
27 | (India) A Anthony | 11 | 11 | 11

Fourth Round
14 | (Chinese Taipei) Chen C-a | 11 | 11 | 11
27 | (India) A Anthony | 6 | 8 | 8

==== Section 8 ====
First Round

Second Round
104 | (Macau) Kou C C | 9 | 17 | 5
49 | (Kazakhstan) B Zhamal | 11 | 19 | 11
40 | (Thailand) P Tanviriyavechakul | 9 | 11 | 8 | 10
113 | (Philippines) J M Nayre | 11 | 9 | 11 | 12
79 | (Malaysia) Wong Q S | 11 | 12 | 11
85 | (Bangladesh) M A Ridoy | 7 | 10 | 5
72 | (United Arab Emirates) S Albalushi | 4 | 1 | 1
4 | (Japan) T Harimoto | 11 | 11 | 11

Third Round
49 | (Kazakhstan) B Zhamal | 5 | 3 | 4
113 | (Philippines) J M Nayre | 11 | 11 | 11
79 | (Malaysia) Wong Q S | 10 | 3 | 8
4 | (Japan) T Harimoto | 12 | 11 | 11

Fourth Round
113 | (Philippines) J M Nayre | 7 | 1 | 5
4 | (Japan) T Harimoto | 11 | 11 | 11

=== Bottom half ===
==== Section 9 ====
First Round

Second Round
3 | (China) Lin GY | 11 | 11 | 11
129 | (Uzbekistan) S Tyan | 4 | 2 | 5
99 | (Kyrgyzstan) E Tsoi | 2 | 6 | 2
50 | (Macau) Cheong C Che | 11 | 11 | 11
80 | (Bangladesh) M Chowdhury | 6 | 6 | 3
18 | (Japan) Y Uda | 11 | 11 | 11
119 | (Palestine) F Masalma | 3 | 3 | 2
112 | (Philippines) R Gonzales | 11 | 11 | 11

Third Round
3 | (China) Lin GY | 11 | 11 | 11
50 | (Macau) Cheong C Che | 4 | 7 | 3
18 | (Japan) Y Uda | 11 | 7 | 11 | 12 | 11
112 | (Philippines) R Gonzales | 9 | 11 | 3 | 14 | 8

Fourth Round
3 | (China) Lin GY | 11 | 11 | 11
18 | (Japan) Y Uda | 6 | 4 | 7

==== Section 10 ====
First Round

Second Round
57 | (Lebanon) M Hamie | 12 | 17 | 11
59 | (Kazakhstan) A Kenzhigulov | 10 | 15 | 6
105 | (Malaysia) C I Goh K H H | 11 | 11 | 8 | 8 | 11
87 | (Bahrain) M Saleh | 7 | 5 | 11 | 11 | 7
65 | (Mongolia) M Jargalsaikhan | 5 | 13 | 10 | 11 | 11
82 | (Afghanistan) H Mohamadian | 11 | 11 | 12 | 7 | 3
127 | (United Arab Emirates) Z Sarhan | 4 | 6 | 9
16 | (South Korea) An J-h | 11 | 11 | 11

Third Round
57 | (Lebanon) M Hamie | 11 | 11 | 11
105 | (Malaysia) C I Goh K H H | 8 | 5 | 6
65 | (Mongolia) M Jargalsaikhan | 6 | 6 | 9
16 | (South Korea) An J-h | 11 | 11 | 11

Fourth Round
57 | (Lebanon) M Hamie | 6 | 14 | 4 | 7
16 | (South Korea) An J-h | 11 | 12 | 11 | 11

==== Section 11 ====
First Round

Second Round
11 | (India) S Gnanasekaran | w | / | o
95 | (Iraq) O Taher
76 | (Singapore) D Koh S J | 12 | 11 | 11
73 | (Sri Lanka) S Warusawithana | 10 | 6 | 7
60 | (Kuwait) S Al-Hasan | 5 | 5 | 8
20 | (Iran) No Alamian | 11 | 11 | 11
47 | (Thailand) P Passara | w | / | o
108 | (Mongolia) B-I Ganbaatar

Third Round
13 | (India) S Gnanasekaran | 11 | 11 | 11
76 | (Singapore) D Koh S J | 6 | 4 | 5
20 | (Iran) No Alamian | 11 | 13 | 11
47 | (Thailand) P Passara | 7 | 11 | 8

Fourth Round
13 | (India) S Gnanasekaran | 8 | 11 | 11 | 11
20 | (Iran) No Alamian | 11 | 7 | 6 | 5

==== Section 12 ====
First Round

Second Round
100 | (Saudi Arabia) A Alabbad | 3 | 11 | 3 | 8
30 | (Chinese Taipei) Peng W-w | 11 | 8 | 11 | 11
67 | (Turkmenistan) Ras Ahmedov | 7 | 8 | 4
74 | (Jordan) K Khader | 11 | 11 | 11
91 | (Indonesia) A S Pramudya | 4 | 9 | 7
36 | (South Korea) Kim M-h | 11 | 11 | 11
28 | (North Korea) An J-s | 11 | 11 | 4 | 4 | 12
7 | (Hong Kong) Wong C T | 5 | 5 | 11 | 11 | 10

Third Round
30 | (Chinese Taipei) Peng W-w | 11 | 11 | 11
74 | (Jordan) K Khader | 7 | 6 | 3
36 | (South Korea) Kim M-h | 2 | 5 | 6
28 | (North Korea) An J-s | 11 | 11 | 11

Fourth Round
30 | (Chinese Taipei) Peng W-w | 6 | 11 | 3
28 | (North Korea) An J-s | 11 | 13 | 11

==== Section 13 ====
First Round

Second Round
6 | (South Korea) Jang W-j | 13 | 11 | 11
33 | (Hong Kong) Ng P N | 11 | 2 | 8
23 | (India) H Desai | 11 | 6 | 11 | 11
55 | (Thailand) Y Panagitgun | 9 | 11 | 5 | 5
58 | (Lebanon) D Cheaib | 11 | 11 | 13
88 | (Bahrain) S M Mahfoodh | 4 | 3 | 11
44 | (Singapore) E Poh S F | 11 | 11 | 11
103 | (Macau) He C F | 8 | 7 | 3

Third Round
6 | (South Korea) Jang W-j | 7 | 11 | 11 | 11
23 | (India) H Desai | 11 | 2 | 5 | 5
58 | (Lebanon) D Cheaib
44 | (Singapore) E Poh S F | w | / | o

Fourth Round
6 | (South Korea) Jang W-j | 11 | 8 | 11 | 11
44 | (Singapore) E Poh S F | 7 | 11 | 6 | 5

==== Section 14 ====
First Round

Second Round
110 | (Nepal) A Malla | 7 | 8 | 8
43 | (Saudi Arabia) A Bu Shulaybi | 11 | 11 | 11
39 | (Iran) A Ahmadian | 11 | 11 | 11
117 | (Palestine) Y Abou Sef | 7 | 6 | 4
124 | (Sri Lanka) C Ginige | 11 | 11 | 11
71 | (United Arab Emirates) E Alblooshi | 8 | 3 | 6
29 | (Uzbekistan) Z Kenjaev | 7 | 2 | 8
9 | (China) Wang CQ | 11 | 11 | 11

Third Round
43 | (Saudi Arabia) A Bu Shulaybi | 8 | 9 | 10
39 | (Iran) A Ahmadian | 11 | 11 | 12
124 | (Sri Lanka) C Ginige | 3 | 2 | 1
9 | (China) Wang CQ | 11 | 11 | 11

Fourth Round
39 | (Iran) A Ahmadian | 5 | 12 | 5 | 6
9 | (China) Wang CQ | 11 | 10 | 11 | 11

==== Section 15 ====
First Round

Second Round
12 | (Japan) K Yoshimura | 11 | 11 | 11
22 | (Thailand) S Wisutmaythangkoon | 5 | 6 | 8
62 | (Kuwait) M Alrashidi | 7 | 6 | 5
31 | (India) M V Thakkar | 11 | 11 | 11
35 | (Chinese Taipei) Liao C-t | 11 | 11 | 11
94 | (Indonesia) F F Fadilah | 2 | 6 | 3
17 | (Kazakhstan) K Gerassimenko | 11 | 11 | 11
116 | (Philippines) R R Jacolo | 9 | 6 | 8

Third Round
12 | (Japan) K Yoshimura | 12 | 13 | 14 | 4 | 9
31 | (India) M V Thakkar | 10 | 11 | 16 | 11 | 11
35 | (Chinese Taipei) Liao C-t | 12 | 8 | 11 | 9 | 11
17 | (Kazakhstan) K Gerassimenko | 10 | 11 | 7 | 11 | 8

Fourth Round
31 | (India) M V Thakkar | 9 | 6 | 3
35 | (Chinese Taipei) Liao C-t | 11 | 11 | 11

==== Section 16 ====
First Round

Second Round
45 | (Malaysia) J Choong | 11 | 11 | 15
123 | (Qatar) M Abdelwahab | 5 | 7 | 13
53 | (Jordan) Z Aldmaisy | 11 | 11 | 11
126 | (Turkmenistan) G Allanazarov | 3 | 7 | 9
109 | (Mongolia) S-O Gankhurag | 11 | 11 | 3 | 9
120 | (North Korea) Ri J-s | 13 | 9 | 11 | 11
38 | (Hong Kong) Li H M | 1 | 8 | 8
2 | (China) Fan ZD | 11 | 11 | 11

Third Round
45 | (Malaysia) J Choong | 11 | 11 | 11
53 | (Jordan) Z Aldmaisy | 6 | 4 | 9
120 | (North Korea) Ri J-s | 7 | 4 | 5
2 | (China) Fan ZD | 11 | 11 | 11

Fourth Round
45 | (Malaysia) J Choong | 3 | 4 | 6
2 | (China) Fan ZD | 11 | 11 | 11
