= 2024 Asian Table Tennis Championships – Men's team =

Men's team at the 2024 Asian Table Tennis Championships
- Venue: Daulet Sport Complex
- Date: 7–13 October 2024

The men's team in table tennis at the 2024 Asian Table Tennis Championships was held at Daulet Sport Complex from 7 to 13 October 2024.

== Format ==
All matches in the team events will be played as a best-of-five series of individual matches, with the following order of play:

| Match 1 | Match 2 | Match 3 | Match 4 | Match 5 |
|---|---|---|---|---|
| A vs X | B vs Y | C vs Z | A vs Y | B vs X |

The team events are divided into two divisions:

=== 1st Division ===
- All teams excluding the top 6 from the 2023 edition will compete in the 1st Division.
- Teams are divided into groups of 3 or 4.
- The winners of each group advance to a progressive knock-out stage to decide the top two teams.
- Remaining teams play additional matches in a progressive knock-out format to determine final placings.

=== Champion Division ===
- It consists of:
  - The top 6 teams from the 2023 edition.
  - The top 2 teams from the 1st Division.
- Play begins directly in a progressive knock-out format to determine the final positions and the champions.

== Seeding ==
The seeding was based on ranking on 2023 Asian Table Tennis Championships.

=== Teams directly qualify to Champions Division ===
| Seed | Team | Qualification |
|---|---|---|
| 1 | China | 2023 Champion |
| 2 | Chinese Taipei | 2023 Runner-up |
| 3 | South Korea | 2023 Semi-finalist |
| 4 | India | 2023 Semi-finalist |
| 5 | Japan | 2023 Winner of 5th/6th place |
| 6 | Iran | 2023 Loser of 5th/6th place |

=== Teams playing in First Division ===
| Seed | Team |
|---|---|
| 7 | Singapore |
| 8 | Kazakhstan (Q) |
| 9 | Hong Kong China (Q) |
| 10 | Thailand |
| 11 | Malaysia |
| 12 | Saudi Arabia |
| 13 | Mongolia |
| 14 | Uzbekistan |
| 15 | Sri Lanka |
| 16 | Qatar |
| 17 | Pakistan |
| 18 | Kyrgyzstan |
| 19 | North Korea |
| 20 | Bahrain |
| 21 | Maldives |
| 22 | Jordan |
| 23 | Philippines |
| 24 | Oman |

Q: Teams Qualified to Champions Division

== First division ==
=== Group 1 ===
| Pos | Team | Pld | W | L | Pts | Promotion | SGP | QAT | MDV |
|---|---|---|---|---|---|---|---|---|---|
| 1 | Singapore | 2 | 2 | 0 | 4 | Promote to First Division semifinals | — | 3–0 | 3–0 |
| 2 | Qatar | 2 | 1 | 1 | 3 | | 0–3 | — | 3–1 |
| 3 | Maldives | 2 | 0 | 2 | 2 | | 0–3 | 1–3 | — |

Source: ITTF

=== Group 2 ===
| Pos | Team | Pld | W | L | Pts | Promotion | KAZ | PRK | PAK |
|---|---|---|---|---|---|---|---|---|---|
| 1 | Kazakhstan | 2 | 2 | 0 | 4 | Promote to First Division semifinals | — | 3–2 | 3–0 |
| 2 | North Korea | 2 | 1 | 1 | 3 | | 2–3 | — | 3–0 |
| 3 | Pakistan | 2 | 0 | 2 | 2 | | 0–3 | 0–3 | — |

Source: ITTF

=== Group 3 ===
| Pos | Team | Pld | W | L | Pts | Promotion | HKG | BHR | KGZ |
|---|---|---|---|---|---|---|---|---|---|
| 1 | Hong Kong | 2 | 2 | 0 | 4 | Promote to First Division quarterfinals | — | 3–0 | 3–0 |
| 2 | Bahrain | 2 | 1 | 1 | 3 | | 0–3 | — | 0–3 |
| 3 | Kyrgyzstan | 2 | 0 | 2 | 2 | | 0–3 | 3–0 | — |

Source: ITTF

=== Group 4 ===
| Pos | Team | Pld | W | L | Pts | Promotion | THA | UZB | OMN |
|---|---|---|---|---|---|---|---|---|---|
| 1 | Thailand | 2 | 2 | 0 | 4 | Promote to First Division quarterfinals | — | 3–0 | 3–0 |
| 2 | Uzbekistan | 2 | 1 | 1 | 3 | | 0–3 | — | 3–0 |
| 3 | Oman | 2 | 0 | 2 | 2 | | 0–3 | 0–3 | — |

Source: ITTF

=== Group 5 ===
| Pos | Team | Pld | W | L | Pts | Promotion | MAS | PHI | MGL |
|---|---|---|---|---|---|---|---|---|---|
| 1 | Malaysia | 2 | 2 | 0 | 4 | Promote to First Division quarterfinals | — | 3–0 | 3–1 |
| 2 | Philippines | 2 | 1 | 1 | 3 | | 0–3 | — | 3–0 |
| 3 | Mongolia | 2 | 0 | 2 | 2 | | 1–3 | 0–3 | — |

Source: ITTF

=== Group 6 ===
| Pos | Team | Pld | W | L | Pts | Promotion | KSA | SRI | JOR |
|---|---|---|---|---|---|---|---|---|---|
| 1 | Saudi Arabia | 2 | 2 | 0 | 4 | Promote to First Division quarterfinals | — | 3–0 | 3–0 |
| 2 | Sri Lanka | 2 | 1 | 1 | 3 | | 0–3 | — | 3–0 |
| 3 | Jordan | 2 | 0 | 2 | 2 | | 0–3 | 0–3 | — |

Source: ITTF

=== Knockout Stage ===
Quarterfinals
11 | Malaysia | 0
9 | Hong Kong | 3
10 | Thailand | 1
12 | Saudi Arabia | 3

Semifinals
7 | Singapore | 1
9 | Hong Kong | 3
12 | Saudi Arabia | 0
8 | Kazakhstan | 3

Advanced to Champions Division
9 | Hong Kong | Q
8 | Kazakhstan | Q

== Champions Division ==
Quarterfinals
1 | China | 3
6 | Iran | 1
3 | (South Korea) Republic of Korea | 3
5 | Japan | 1
4 | India | 3
8 | Kazakhstan | 1
9 | Hong Kong | 2
2 | Chinese Taipei | 3

Semifinals
1 | China | 3
3 | (South Korea) Republic of Korea | 1
4 | India | 0
2 | Chinese Taipei | 3

Final
1 | China | 3
2 | Chinese Taipei | 1
