= 2019 Asian Table Tennis Championships =

- Date: 15–22 September 2019
- Edition: 24th
- Location: Yogyakarta, Indonesia
- Venue: Among Rogo Stadium

Champions

Men's singles
- (China) Xu Xin

Women's singles
- (China) Sun Yingsha

Men's doubles
- (China) Liang Jingkun / (China) Lin Gaoyuan

Women's doubles
- (China) Ding Ning / (China) Zhu Yuling

Mixed doubles
- (China) Xu Xin / (China) Liu Shiwen

Men's team
- China

Women's team
- China
- Asian Table Tennis Championships

The 2019 Asian Table Tennis Championships were held in Yogyakarta, Indonesia from 15 to 22 September 2019. Around 128 men and 100 women table tennis players competed in the singles, doubles and team events.

== Schedule ==
Five individual and two team events were contested.

Rounds in main draw
Finals

Date	15 September		16 September		17 September			18 September			19 September			20 September			21 September		22 September	
Men's singles											R1	R2	R3	R4	R5	QF			SF	F
Women's singles								R1			R2			R3	R4	QF	SF	F		
Men's doubles								R1			R2		R3	QF			SF	F		
Women's doubles											R1	R2	R3	QF					SF	F
Mixed doubles					R1		R2	R3		QF	SF						F			
Men's team	GS	QF	POS	QF	POS			POS	SF	F										
Women's team	GS	QF	POS	QF	POS	SF	F	POS												

== Participating ==
=== Participating nations ===
- Afghanistan (3)
- Bangladesh (6)
- Bahrain (4)
- China (10)
- Hong Kong (10)
- Indonesia (10)
- India (10)
- Iran (8)
- Iraq (3)
- Jordan (7)
- Japan (10)
- Kazakhstan (6)
- Kuwait (4)
- Kyrgyzstan (3)
- Lebanon (6)
- Macau (8)
- Malaysia (8)
- Maldives (4)
- Mongolia (9)
- Nepal (6)
- North Korea (9)
- Palestine (3)
- Philippines (10)
- Saudi Arabia (4)
- Singapore (10)
- South Korea (10)
- Sri Lanka (8)
- Thailand (9)
- Turkmenistan (7)
- Chinese Taipei (11)
- United Arab Emirates (4)
- Uzbekistan (8)

== Medal summary ==
=== Medal table ===
Rank	Nation	Gold	Silver	Bronze	Total
1	China	7	5	3	15
2	Japan	0	1	5	6
3	South Korea	0	1	1	2
4	Chinese Taipei	0	0	2	2
4	Hong Kong	0	0	2	2
6	Singapore	0	0	1	1
Totals (6 entries)		7	7	14	28

=== Events ===
Event	Gold	Silver	Bronze
Men's singles	(China) Xu Xin	(China) Lin Gaoyuan	(Japan) Tomokazu Harimoto
Men's singles	(China) Xu Xin	(China) Lin Gaoyuan	(China) Fan Zhendong
Women's singles	(China) Sun Yingsha	(China) Liu Shiwen	(China) Chen Meng
Women's singles	(China) Sun Yingsha	(China) Liu Shiwen	(China) Ding Ning
Men's doubles	(China) Liang Jingkun (China) Lin Gaoyuan	(China) Fan Zhendong (China) Xu Xin	(Japan) Maharu Yoshimura (Japan) Shunsuke Togami
Men's doubles	(China) Liang Jingkun (China) Lin Gaoyuan	(China) Fan Zhendong (China) Xu Xin	(Hong Kong) Lam Siu Hang (Hong Kong) Ng Pak Nam
Women's doubles	(China) Ding Ning (China) Zhu Yuling	(China) Chen Meng (China) Wang Manyu	(Japan) Miu Hirano (Japan) Kasumi Ishikawa
Women's doubles	(China) Ding Ning (China) Zhu Yuling	(China) Chen Meng (China) Wang Manyu	(Japan) Saki Shibata (Japan) Hitomi Sato
Mixed doubles	(China) Xu Xin (China) Liu Shiwen	(China) Wang Chuqin (China) Sun Yingsha	(South Korea) Lee Sang-su (South Korea) Jeon Ji-hee
Mixed doubles	(China) Xu Xin (China) Liu Shiwen	(China) Wang Chuqin (China) Sun Yingsha	(Hong Kong) Wong Chun Ting (Hong Kong) Doo Hoi Kem
Men's team	China; Liang Jingkun; Xu Xin; Wang Chuqin; Fan Zhendong; Lin Gaoyuan	South Korea; Jang Woo-jin; An Jae-hyun; Kim Min-hyeok; Jeoung Young-sik; Lee Sang-su	Chinese Taipei; Liao Cheng-ting; Peng Wang-wei; Hung Tzu-hsiang; Chen Chien-an; Wang Tai-wei
Men's team	China; Liang Jingkun; Xu Xin; Wang Chuqin; Fan Zhendong; Lin Gaoyuan	South Korea; Jang Woo-jin; An Jae-hyun; Kim Min-hyeok; Jeoung Young-sik; Lee Sang-su	Japan; Takuya Jin; Kazuhiro Yoshimura; Maharu Yoshimura; Tomokazu Harimoto; Yukiya Uda
Women's team	China; Wang Manyu; Sun Yingsha; Liu Shiwen; Chen Meng; Ding Ning	Japan; Saki Shibata; Kasumi Ishikawa; Miu Hirano; Hitomi Sato; Miyu Kato	Chinese Taipei; Chen Szu-yu; Cheng Hsien-tzu; Cheng I-ching; Liu Hsing-yin; Su Pei-ling
Women's team	China; Wang Manyu; Sun Yingsha; Liu Shiwen; Chen Meng; Ding Ning	Japan; Saki Shibata; Kasumi Ishikawa; Miu Hirano; Hitomi Sato; Miyu Kato	Singapore; Feng Tianwei; Lin Ye; Wong Xinru; Yu Mengyu; Goi Rui Xuan

== See also ==
- 2019 ITTF-ATTU Asian Cup
