= Qatar Table Tennis Association =

Governing body

The Qatar Table Tennis Association is the governing body for the sport of table tennis in Qatar. It is a member of the Arab Table Tennis Association, Asian Table Tennis Association and World Table Tennis. The president of the body is Khalil Almohannad.

The Federation is currently based at the Al Bidda Tower in Doha.
