= 2013 Asian Table Tennis Championships – Women's singles =

== Medalists ==
Event	Gold	Silver	Bronze
Women's singles	(China)	(China)	(China) Chen Meng
Women's singles	(China)	(China)	(China) Zhu Yuling

== Seeds ==
Singles matches were best of 7 games in the main draw.

1. (China) Ding Ning
2. (China) Liu Shiwen
3. (Singapore) Feng Tianwei (quarterfinals)
4. (China) Zhu Yuling (semifinals)
5. (China) Chen Meng (semifinals)
6. (Japan) Kasumi Ishikawa (quarterfinals)
7. (China) Guo Yue (quarterfinals)
8. (Japan) Ai Fukuhara (fourth round)
9. (South Korea) Seo Hyo-Won (fourth round)
10. (South Korea) Seok Ha-Jung (fourth round)
11. (South Korea) Yang Ha-Eun (third round)
12. (Singapore) Yu Mengyu (quarterfinals)
13. (Japan) Sayaka Hirano (fourth round)
14. (Hong Kong) Lee Ho Ching (fourth round)
15. (Chinese Taipei) Huang Yi-Hua (fourth round)
16. (Japan) Misaki Morizono (second round)

== Draw ==
=== Finals ===
Quarterfinals
1	(China) Ding Ning	w/o
7	(China) Guo Yue
12	(Singapore) Yu Mengyu	3	6	8	9
4	(China) Zhu Yuling	11	11	11	11
3	(Singapore) Feng Tianwei	13	6	11	6	4
5	(China) Chen Meng	15	11	4	11	11
6	(Japan) Kasumi Ishikawa	5	6	8	7
2	(China) Liu Shiwen	11	11	11	11

Semifinals
1	(China) Ding Ning	11	11	11	11
4	(China) Zhu Yuling	2	8	5	8
5	(China) Chen Meng	7	2	11	5
2	(China) Liu Shiwen	11	11	13	11

Final
1	(China) Ding Ning
2	(China) Liu Shiwen

=== Section 1 ===
First Round
(Pakistan) Aisha Iqbal Ansari	1	5	2	5
(Kazakhstan) Yuliya Gats	11	11	11	11

Second Round
1	(China) Ding Ning	11	11	11	11
(Kazakhstan) Yuliya Gats	2	3	2	3
(India) Shamini Kumaresan	11	11	11	11
(Iran) Mahjobeh Omrani	8	5	6	6
(Chinese Taipei) Cheng Hsien-Tzu	11	11	13	11
(Lebanon) Tvin Moumjoghlian	6	11	1	4
(Macau) Kuok Cheng I	1	1	2	4
9	(South Korea) Seo Hyo-Won	11	11	11	11

Third Round
1	(China) Ding Ning	11	11	12	11
(India) Shamini Kumaresan	7	3	10	5
(Chinese Taipei) Cheng Hsien-Tzu	6	3	3	7
9	(South Korea) Seo Hyo-Won	11	11	11	11

Fourth Round
1	(China) Ding Ning	11	11	11	11
9	(South Korea) Seo Hyo-Won	8	4	6	4

=== Section 2 ===
First Round
(Thailand) Nanthana Komwong	11	11	11	11
(Uzbekistan) Gulnora Akbarova	3	4	4	5
(Malaysia) Ting Hie Phin	11	11	11	12
(Singapore) Yee Herng Hwee	3	6	2	10

Second Round
16	(Japan) Misaki Morizono	0	8	8	8
(Thailand) Nanthana Komwong	11	11	11	11
(South Korea) Song Ma-Eum	11	11	11	11
(Nepal) Manita Chitrakar	4	2	5	7
(Hong Kong) Doo Hoi Kem	12	11	11	11
(Vietnam) Phan Hoang Tuong Gian	10	5	5	6
(Malaysia) Ting Hie Phin	5	3	2	4
7	(China) Guo Yue	11	11	11	11

Third Round
(Thailand) Nanthana Komwong	10	11	13	11	11	11
(South Korea) Song Ma-Eum	12	6	15	9	8	4
(Hong Kong) Doo Hoi Kem	12	8	8	6
7	(China) Guo Yue	14	11	11	11

Fourth Round
(Thailand) Nanthana Komwong	6	6	8	3
7	(China) Guo Yue	11	11	11	11

=== Section 3 ===
First Round
(Mongolia) Byamba Erdenesuvd	5	3	1	6
(Uzbekistan) Rimma Gufranova	11	11	11	11

Second Round
8	(Japan) Ai Fukuhara	11	11	11	11
(Uzbekistan) Rimma Gufranova	6	1	6	4
(Vietnam) Nguyen Thi Viet Linh	11	11	12	11
(Sri Lanka) Ishara Madurang	9	5	10	7
(India) Neha Aggarwal	8	9	11	4	4
(South Korea) Cho Ha-la	11	11	9	11	11
(Nepal) Kajol Rauniyar	1	1	2	1
12	(Singapore) Yu Mengyu	11	11	11	11

Third Round
8	(Japan) Ai Fukuhara	11	11	8	11	11
(Vietnam) Nguyen Thi Viet Linh	2	2	11	4	2
(South Korea) Cho Ha-la	5	3	5	2
12	(Singapore) Yu Mengyu	11	11	11	11

Fourth Round
8	(Japan) Ai Fukuhara	6	11	8	12	7	9
12	(Singapore) Yu Mengyu	11	8	11	10	11	11

=== Section 4 ===
First Round
(Malaysia) Ng Sock Khim	11	11	11	12	11
(Vietnam) Pham Thi Thien Kim	2	4	6	14	8

Second Round
15	(Chinese Taipei) Huang Yi-Hua	11	11	8	11	11
(Hong Kong) Li Ching Wan	4	3	11	5	8
(Qatar) Aia Mohamed	4	4	7	7
(Macau) Leong On Na	11	11	11	11
(Thailand) Tamolwan Khetkhuan	11	11	14	11
(Pakistan) Sadia Falak Sher	7	5	12	6
(Malaysia) Ng Sock Khim	9	6	9	3
4	(China) Zhu Yuling	11	11	11	11

Third Round
15	(Chinese Taipei) Huang Yi-Hua	11	7	11	11	12
(Macau) Leong On Na	8	11	3	3	10
(Thailand) Tamolwan Khetkhuan	1	4	2	12
4	(China) Zhu Yuling	11	11	11	14

Fourth Round
15	(Chinese Taipei) Huang Yi-Hua	9	11	9	12	9	6
4	(China) Zhu Yuling	11	9	11	10	11	11

=== Section 5 ===
First Round
(Chinese Taipei) Liu Hsing-Yin	11	11	11	11
(Nepal) Sunita Lama	2	7	5	5

Second Round
3	(Singapore) Feng Tianwei	11	11	16	6	11
(Chinese Taipei) Liu Hsing-Yin	8	7	14	11	7
(Kazakhstan) Nataliya Sladkova	14	7	1	8
(Hong Kong) Guan Mengyuan	16	11	11	11
(Sri Lanka) Pavani Sirisena	11	11	7	10	11	7	11
(Mongolia) Delgermaa Mergen	9	9	11	12	3	11	8
(Uzbekistan) Nodira Burkhankhodjaeva	2	2	5	1
13	(Japan) Sayaka Hirano	11	11	11	11

Third Round
3	(Singapore) Feng Tianwei	11	11	11	11
(Hong Kong) Guan Mengyuan	3	7	2	9
(Sri Lanka) Pavani Sirisena	7	5	4	2
13	(Japan) Sayaka Hirano	11	11	11	11

Fourth Round
3	(Singapore) Feng Tianwei	11	11	11	11
13	(Japan) Sayaka Hirano	4	3	8	9

=== Section 6 ===
First Round
(Macau) Wong Sio Leng	4	6	4	2
(Thailand) Anisara Muangsuk	11	11	11	11
(Chinese Taipei) Liu Yu-Hsin	6	5	3	9
(Japan) Marina Matsuzawa	11	11	11	11

Second Round
11	(South Korea) Yang Ha-Eun	11	11	5	11	9	7	11
(Thailand) Anisara Muangsuk	7	4	11	8	11	11	4
(India) Ankita Das	6	11	11	11	8	11
(Vietnam) Mai Hoang My Trang	11	9	9	6	11	9
(Iran) Maryam Samet	11	11	11	11
(Qatar) Kholoud Hussain	2	8	5	3
(Japan) Marina Matsuzawa	9	11	9	6	8
5	(China) Chen Meng	11	9	11	11	11

Third Round
11	(South Korea) Yang Ha-Eun	9	11	11	9	11	7	8
(India) Ankita Das	11	3	2	11	7	11	11
(Iran) Maryam Samet	6	1	5	8
5	(China) Chen Meng	11	11	11	11

Fourth Round
(India) Ankita Das	6	4	3	6
5	(China) Chen Meng	11	11	11	11

=== Section 7 ===
First Round
(Sri Lanka) Ridhmi Dhananjani	4	7	3	3
(Malaysia) Beh Lee Wei	11	11	11	11
(Uzbekistan) Olga Kim	11	11	7	6	9	11	11
(Iran) Neda Shahsavari	8	5	11	11	11	7	7

Second Round
6	(Japan) Kasumi Ishikawa	11	11	11	11
(Malaysia) Beh Lee Wei	2	7	9	7
(India) Mouma Das	11	11	12	7	17	9	11
(Singapore) Li Isabelle Siyun	6	5	11	11	19	11	9
(Macau) Cheong Cheng I	12	11	7	11	10	11
(Pakistan) Shabnam Bilal	10	4	11	8	12	3
(Uzbekistan) Olga Kim	6	10	5	7
10	(South Korea) Seok Ha-Jung	11	12	11	11

Third Round
6	(Japan) Kasumi Ishikawa	11	8	11	11	11
(India) Mouma Das	4	11	2	7	7
(Macau) Cheong Cheng I	2	11	2	5	3
10	(South Korea) Seok Ha-Jung	11	9	11	11	11

Fourth Round
6	(Japan) Kasumi Ishikawa	11	11	14	8	6	11
10	(South Korea) Seok Ha-Jung	4	5	12	11	11	6

=== Section 8 ===
First Round
(India) Madhurika Patkar	11	9	7	11	11	11
(Chinese Taipei) Huang Hsin	4	11	11	5	4	6

Second Round
14	(Hong Kong) Lee Ho Ching	11	11	11	11
(Mongolia) Gundegmaa Indra	3	2	7	1
(Kazakhstan) Gulchekhra Khusseinova	11	11	12	11
(Nepal) Selisha Khadgi	6	6	10	5
(Vietnam) Nguyễn Thị Nga	5	9	11	15	12	11
(Thailand) Piyaporn Pannak	11	11	9	13	10	9
(India) Madhurika Patkar	5	9	3	4
2	(China) Liu Shiwen	11	11	11	11

Third Round
14	(Hong Kong) Lee Ho Ching	w/o
(Kazakhstan) Gulchekhra Khusseinova
(Vietnam) Nguyễn Thị Nga	4	3	7	4
2	(China) Liu Shiwen	11	11	11	11

Fourth Round
14	(Hong Kong) Lee Ho Ching	7	4	3	4
2	(China) Liu Shiwen	11	11	11	11
