= Cedric Nuytinck =

Belgian table tennis player

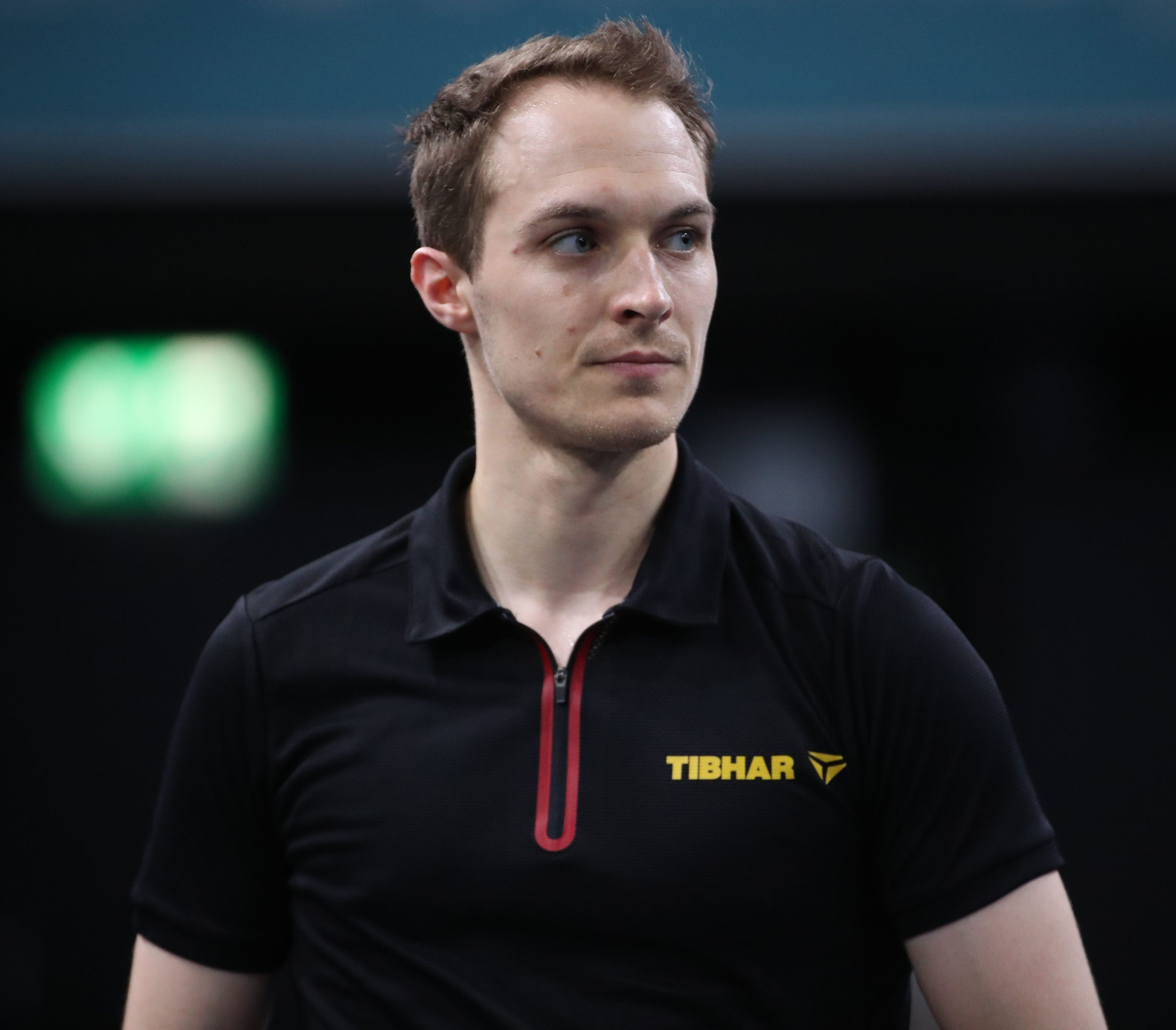

Personal information
- Nationality: Belgium
- Born: 6 January 1993 (age 33) Gand, Belgium
- Height: 180 cm (5 ft 11 in)
- Weight: 80 kg (176 lb)

Sport
- Sport: Table tennis
- Club: FC Sarrebruck
- Playing style: Left-handed, shakehand grip
- Highest ranking: 38 (March 2018)
- Current ranking: 56 (5 October 2026)
Medal record
Table tennis
Representing Belgium
European Championships
Silver medal – second place	2020 Warsaw	Doubles

Cedric Nuytinck (born 6 January 1993) is a Belgian table tennis player. He is five times champion of Belgian table tennis championships at men's singles and three in doubles.

== Biography ==
Cedric Nuytinck started playing table tennis at a very young age at TTC Sleindinge then joined TTC Knal Deinze in 2005 with whom he moved from the Belgian second division to the Superdivision in 2007 at just 13 years old. He won several Belgian championships in the youth category.

At the 2020 European Championships, Nuytinck won silver in the men's doubles with his partner Jakub Dyjas.
