= Yan An (table tennis) =

Chinese table tennis player

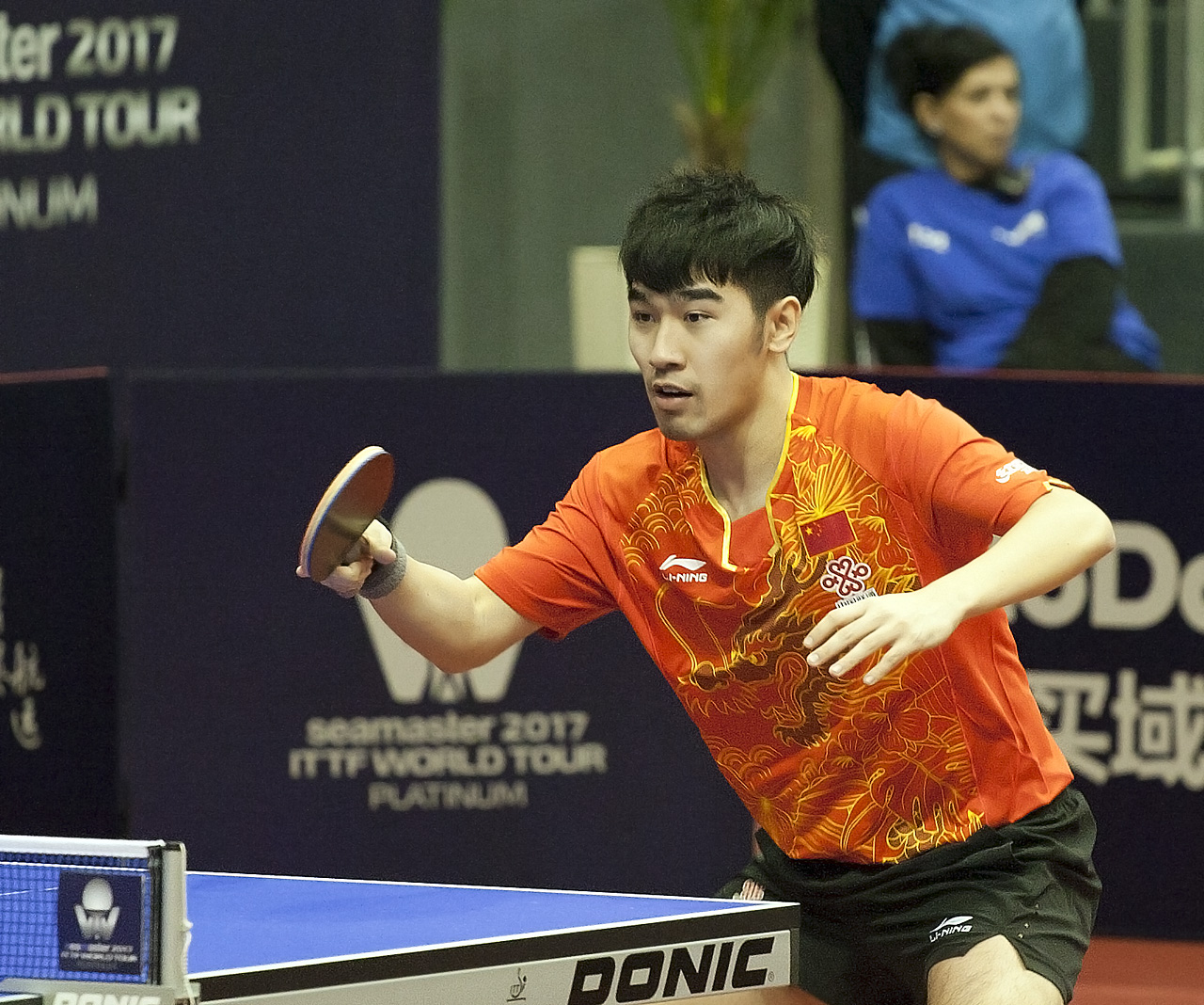
- ITTF World Tour 2017 German Open, Magdeburg, Germany, 7 Nov 2017 – 12 Nov 2017, Yan An

Personal information
- Nationality: Chinese
- Born: 12 January 1993 (age 33) Beijing, China

Sport
- Sport: Table tennis
- Playing style: Right-handed, shakehand grip
- Highest ranking: 7 (December 2013)
- Current ranking: 90 (July 2018)
Medal record
Representing China

Yan An (Chinese: 闫安; born 12 January 1993) is a Chinese table tennis player.

== Career ==
On 9 September 2008, in the men's singles final of the 2008 National Junior Table Tennis Championships, Yan An defeated Liu Shujian 4-0 to win the championship. In February, at the 6th World Table Tennis Youth Championships, Yan An entered the semi-finals after defeating the Polish player 4-2, Takahiro Niwa 4-1, and Kim Min-seok 4-3 in the men's singles event, but was eliminated in the semi-finals after losing 3-4 to Chen Jianan.

On 29 September 2009, in the mixed doubles quarter-finals of the 11th National Games of the People's Republic of China, Yan An/Ding Ning defeated the Sichuan combination Xu Ruifeng/Nie Wei 3-0 and advanced to the semi-finals. On 30 September, in the men's singles quarter-finals of the 11th National Games of the People's Republic of China, Yan An lost 3-4 to Ma Lin and was eliminated. On the same day, in the mixed doubles third place battle at the 11th National Games of the People's Republic of China, Yan An/Ding Ning defeated the PLA combination Xu Ke/Liu Chun 3-1 to win the bronze medal.

In 2010, Yan An joined the Bayi Rongsheng Heavy Industries Club and won the runner-up in the men's team of the Table Tennis Super League.

On 26 January 2013, in the second round of the 2012 Table Tennis Super League Finals, Ningbo Beilun defeated Shanghai Jinmai Chi 3-1 to win the championship. In the singles event of the team competition, Yan An defeated Xu Xin 3-1. In this season, Yan An ranked third in the men's win rate list with a record of 22 wins and 12 losses, second only to Ma Long and Zhang Jike. On 24 February, in the men's singles final of the 2013 ITTF World Tour Qatar Open, Yan An lost 3-4 to Ma Long and finished second. On 20 May, in the men's doubles final of the 2013 ITTF World Tour Paris Open, Ma Lin/Yan An lost 2-4 to the Chinese Taipei combination Chuang Chih-Yuan/Chen Chien-An and only won the silver medal. On 1 December, in the men's singles final of the 2013 ITTF Swedish Open, Yan An defeated Fan Zhendong 4-2 to win the first ITTF Pro Tour singles championship in his career.

On 3 January 2014, Yan An withdrew from the 2013 ITTF World Tour Finals for some reason. On 22 February, in the third round of the men's singles of the 2014 ITTF World Tour Qatar Open, Yan An lost 2-4 to Gao Ning and was eliminated in the top 16.

On 5 September 2017, in the third and fourth place final of the men's table tennis doubles at the 13th National Games of the People's Republic of China, Yan An/Lin Gaoyuan defeated the Jiangsu combination Zhang Yudong/Sun Wen 3-1 to win the bronze medal.

On 22 September 2021, in the 1/16 finals of the men's table tennis singles of the 14th Games of the People's Republic of China, Yan An defeated Wang Bo of Heilongjiang team 4-1 and advanced to the top 16. On 25 September, in the men's doubles table tennis semi-finals of the 14th Games of the People's Republic of China, Yan An/Xu Chenhao defeated Shang Kun/Zhao Zihao 4-2 and advanced to the finals. On the same day, in the men's doubles table tennis final of the 14th Games of the People's Republic of China, Yan An/Xu Chenhao lost 0-4 to Ma Long/Wang Chuqin and won the runner-up. On 12 October, in the men's team final of the Table Tennis Super League, the Shandong Luneng team composed of Yan An, Wang Chuqin and Ma Long won the runner-up. On 13 October, Yan An announced his withdrawal from the national team.
