= 2021 Asian Table Tennis Championships – Women's singles =

Table tennis competition

Women's singles at the 2021 Asian Table Tennis Championships
- Venue: Lusail Sports Arena
- Date: October 1, 2021 – October 4, 2021
- Competitors: 78 from 21 nations

The women's singles at the 2021 Asian Table Tennis Championships in Doha was held at Lusail Sports Arena from 1 to 4 October 2021.

== System of play ==
All individual events shall be played in a knock-out system. Matches in Singles events and Doubles events shall be played in best of five (5) games in all stages of the competition.

== Schedule ==
All times are Arabia Standard Time (UTC+03:00)

Date	Time	Round
Friday, 1 October 2021	15:00	R1 (1/128)
Saturday, 2 October 2021	16:00	R2 (1/64)
Sunday, 3 October 2021	10:00	R3 (1/32)
Sunday, 3 October 2021	15:20	R4 (1/16)
Sunday, 3 October 2021	18:30	Quarterfinals
Monday, 4 October 2021	11:20	Semifinals
Monday, 4 October 2021	17:00	Final

== Main bracket ==
=== Top Draw ===
==== Section 1 ====
Round of 128
(Japan) M Nagasaki	11	11	11	3
(Pakistan) H Hassan	2	5	1	0

Round of 64
1	(South Korea) Jeon J-h	5	11	11	11	3
(Japan) M Nagasaki	11	6	8	6	1
(Uzbekistan) M Magdieva	7	12	9	0
(Singapore) Goi RX	11	14	11	3
(Nepal) E Thapa	3	11	3	6	1
(Sri Lanka) T Rodrigo	11	9	11	11	3
(Iran) N Shahsavari	11	11	7	11	1
(Chinese Taipei) Liu H-y	13	6	11	13	3

Round of 32
1	(South Korea) Jeon J-h	11	11	11	3
(Singapore) Goi RX	9	2	3	0
(Sri Lanka) T Rodrigo	6	1	5	0
(Chinese Taipei) Liu H-y	11	11	11	3

Round of 16
1	(South Korea) Jeon J-h	11	11	12	3
(Chinese Taipei) Liu H-y	6	4	10	0

==== Section 2 ====
Round of 128
(Qatar) Ali M	4	3	4	0
(India) S Mukherjee	11	11	11	3
(Hong Kong) Lam YL	6	11	11	11	3
(Kazakhstan) S Mirkadirova	11	4	8	5	1

Round of 64
(Mongolia) B-E Batmunkh	6	4	4	0
(India) S Mukherjee	11	11	11	3
(Japan) M Ando	11	11	11	3
(Bangladesh) SR Mou	2	4	3	0
(Maldives) MI Mishka	1	6	8	0
(Chinese Taipei) Cheng H-t	11	11	11	3
(Hong Kong) Lam YL	6	6	1	0
7	(Thailand) S Sawettabut	11	11	11	3

Round of 32
(India) S Mukherjee	11	6	7	7	1
(Japan) M Ando	9	11	11	11	3
(Chinese Taipei) Cheng H-t	11	9	8	6	1
7	(Thailand) S Sawettabut	8	11	11	11	3

Round of 16
(Japan) M Ando	11	11	13	3
7	(Thailand) S Sawettabut	4	5	11	0

==== Section 3 ====
Round of 128
(Hong Kong) Zhu C	11	11	11	3
(Pakistan) S Yasin	1	3	4	0
(Mongolia) D Batbayar	0	9	8	0
(South Korea) Lee Z	11	11	11	3

Round of 64
5	(Chinese Taipei) Chen S-y	5	6	6	0
(Hong Kong) Zhu C	11	11	11	3
(Syria) H Zaza	0
(Maldives) L Ismail	wo
(Uzbekistan) S Madalieva	11	11	8	6	8	2
(Iran) S Safaei	9	8	11	11	11	3
(South Korea) Lee Z	11	11	11	3
(Sri Lanka) I Madurangi	6	5	7	0

Round of 32
(Hong Kong) Zhu C	11	11	11	3
(Maldives) L Ismail	2	1	7	0
(Iran) S Safaei	5	6	9	0
(South Korea) Lee Z	11	11	11	3

Round of 16
(Hong Kong) Zhu C	11	8	11	11	3
(South Korea) Lee Z	7	11	9	6	1

==== Section 4 ====
Round of 128
(Qatar) Faramarzi M	6	11	8	12	9	2
(Jordan) B Al-Wedian	11	6	11	10	11	3
(South Korea) Shin Y-b	11	11	11	3
(Thailand) W Tayapitak	5	3	7	0

Round of 64
(Indonesia) DO Sugiarto	11	11	12	3
(Jordan) B Al-Wedian	4	7	10	0
(Singapore) Wong XR	11	4	11	0
(Kazakhstan) Z Akasheva	13	11	13	3
(India) AG Kamath	11	11	11	3
(Nepal) E Maharjan	3	2	5	0
(South Korea) Shin Y-b	11	11	13	3
3	(Japan) H Sato	7	6	11	0

Round of 32
(Indonesia) DO Sugiarto	11	3	11	0	6	2
(Kazakhstan) Z Akasheva	8	11	6	11	11	3
(India) AG Kamath	3	12	8	0
(South Korea) Shin Y-b	11	14	11	3

Round of 16
(Kazakhstan) Z Akasheva	3	4	6	0
(South Korea) Shin Y-b	11	11	11	3

=== Bottom Draw ===
==== Section 5 ====
Round of 128
(Singapore) Zhou J	11	11	11	3
(Kazakhstan) A Lavrova	6	4	7	0
(Iran) M Karami	11	7	12	11	11	3
(Qatar) Mohamed A	7	11	14	3	7	2

Round of 64
4	(South Korea) Suh H-w	11	11	11	3
(Singapore) Zhou J	3	9	5	0
(Indonesia) N Widarahman	11	7	6	6	1
(Hong Kong) Ng WN	6	11	11	11	3
(Nepal) S Suwal	5	3	5	0
(Sri Lanka) B Bandara	11	11	11	3
(Iran) M Karami	11	11	11	3
(Pakistan) PZ Khan	6	6	4	0

Round of 32
4	(South Korea) Suh H-w	11	12	11	3
(Hong Kong) Ng WN	4	10	3	0
(Sri Lanka) B Bandara	11	5	9	2	1
(Iran) M Karami	9	11	11	11	3

Round of 16
4	(South Korea) Suh H-w	11	11	11	3
(Iran) M Karami	3	5	9	0

==== Section 6 ====
Round of 128
(Qatar) Abdulla S	3	6	11	8	1
(Bangladesh) N Sultana	11	11	6	11	3
(Singapore) Lin Y	11	11	9	11	3
(Iran) M Ashtari	5	9	11	2	1

Round of 64
(Jordan) T Abo-Yaman	11	14	11	3
(Bangladesh) N Sultana	3	12	5	0
(Maldives) A Nazim	11	7	12	0	7	2
(Thailand) P Pinyopisan	9	11	10	11	11	3
(Chinese Taipei) Li Y-j	5	2	11	9	1
(India) A Mukherjee	11	11	4	11	3
(Singapore) Lin Y	8	6	11	3	1
8	(Japan) S Shibata	11	11	7	11	3

Round of 32
(Jordan) T Abo-Yaman	7	8	5	0
(Thailand) P Pinyopisan	11	11	11	3
(India) A Mukherjee	6	5	3	0
8	(Japan) S Shibata	11	11	11	3

Round of 16
(Thailand) P Pinyopisan	5	6	1	0
8	(Japan) S Shibata	11	11	11	3

==== Section 7 ====
Round of 128
(Mongolia) U Munkhbat	4	4	4	0
(Hong Kong) Lee HC	11	11	11	3
(Sri Lanka) M Salpahdoru	11	11	11	3
(Qatar) Ali M	8	4	1	0

Round of 64
6	(Japan) H Hayata	11	11	11	3
(Hong Kong) Lee HC	6	3	5	0
(Maldives) FD Ali	4	5	4	0
(Uzbekistan) R Khadjieva	11	11	11	3
(Iraq) A Hayt	11	3	10	7	1
(Iran) M Farei	9	11	12	11	3
(Sri Lanka) M Salpahdoru	wo
(Thailand) A Muangsuk

Round of 32
6	(Japan) H Hayata	11	11	11	3
(Uzbekistan) R Khadjieva	6	4	3	0
(Iran) M Farei	11	7	9	8	1
(Sri Lanka) M Salpahdoru	5	11	11	11	3

Round of 16
6	(Japan) H Hayata	11	11	11	3
(Sri Lanka) M Salpahdoru	3	6	5	0

==== Section 8 ====
Round of 128
(Kazakhstan) A Bakhyt	9	11	6	9	1
(Singapore) Zhang W	11	9	11	11	3

Round of 64
(South Korea) Choi H-j	11	11	11	3
(Bangladesh) S Sultana	1	4	2	0
(Jordan) Y Aldmaisy	1	2	1	0
(Chinese Taipei) Huang Y-w	11	11	11	3
(Indonesia) S Aminah	4	7	10	0
(India) S Akula	11	11	12	3
(Singapore) Zhang W	11	3	6	4	1
2	(Hong Kong) Doo HK	9	11	11	11	3

Round of 32
(South Korea) Choi H-j	13	11	11	3
(Chinese Taipei) Huang Y-w	11	4	1	0
(India) S Akula	8	10	4	0
2	(Hong Kong) Doo HK	11	12	11	3

Round of 16
(South Korea) Choi H-j	7	2	11	7	1
2	(Hong Kong) Doo HK	11	11	4	11	3

== Final bracket ==
Quarterfinals
1	(South Korea) Jeon J-h	3	11	11	8	10	2
(Japan) M Ando	11	9	7	11	12	3
(Hong Kong) Zhu C	9	8	11	11	3	2
(South Korea) Shin Y-b	11	11	8	6	11	3
4	(South Korea) Suh H-w	8	13	12	0
8	(Japan) S Shibata	11	15	14	3
6	(Japan) H Hayata	11	11	11	3
2	(Hong Kong) Doo HK	7	7	7	0

Semifinals
(Japan) M Ando	11	9	8	7	1
(South Korea) Shin Y-b	8	11	11	11	3
8	(Japan) S Shibata	7	11	9	11	10	2
6	(Japan) H Hayata	11	8	11	8	12	3

Final
(South Korea) Shin Y-b	11	4	8	4	1
6	(Japan) H Hayata	7	11	11	11	3
