= 2020 German Open (table tennis) =

Tournament details
- Dates: 28 January 2020 – 2 February 2020
- Total prize money: US$270,000
- Venue: GETEC Arena
- Location: Magdeburg, Germany

Champions
- Men's singles: (China) Xu Xin
- Women's singles: (China) Chen Meng
- Men's doubles: (South Korea) Cho Dae-seong (South Korea) Jang Woo-jin
- Women's doubles: (China) Chen Meng (China) Wang Manyu
- Mixed doubles: (China) Xu Xin (China) Liu Shiwen

The 2020 German Open was the first event of the 2020 ITTF World Tour. It took place from 28 January to 2 February in Magdeburg, Germany.

== Men's singles ==
=== Seeds ===
1. (China) Xu Xin (champion)
2. (China) Fan Zhendong (quarterfinals)
3. (China) Ma Long (final)
4. (China) Lin Gaoyuan (semifinals)
5. (Japan) Tomokazu Harimoto (first round)
6. (Chinese Taipei) Lin Yun-ju (second round)
7. (China) Liang Jingkun (first round)
8. (Sweden) Mattias Falck (first round)
9. (Germany) Timo Boll (second round)
10. (Germany) Dimitrij Ovtcharov (semifinals)
11. (Japan) Koki Niwa (second round)
12. (South Korea) Jang Woo-jin (first round)
13. (Japan) Jun Mizutani (quarterfinals)
14. (Germany) Patrick Franziska (first round)
15. (South Korea) Lee Sang-su (first round)
16. (South Korea) Jeoung Young-sik (first round)

=== Top half ===
First Round
1	(China) Xu X	11	9	11	9	11	4	11
(South Korea) An J-h	4	11	4	11	8	11	3
(Japan) M Oikawa	6	11	11	6	12	11
14	(Germany) P Franziska	11	5	6	11	10	1
16	(South Korea) Jeoung Y-s	8	9	11	11	9	11	8
(China) Zhao ZH	11	11	7	9	11	7	11
(Germany) B Duda	7	4	11	11	12	8	11
8	(Sweden) M Falck	11	11	6	5	10	11	3
6	(Chinese Taipei) Lin Y-j	11	11	11	11
(Croatia) A Gaćina	5	7	7	3
(Slovenia) D Jorgić	9	8	11	9
13	(Japan) J Mizutani	11	11	13	11
11	(Japan) K Niwa	6	11	11	11	8	11
(United States) K Jha	11	9	5	5	11	8
(Slovakia) Wang Y	11	9	8	10
4	(China) Lin GY	13	11	11	12

Second Round
1	(China) Xu X	11	9	11	11	11
(Japan) M Oikawa	3	11	5	6	7
(China) Zhao ZH	7	9	11	11	10	11	11
(Germany) B Duda	11	11	6	5	12	8	8
6	(Chinese Taipei) Lin Y-j	12	11	11	5	8	7	10
13	(Japan) J Mizutani	10	6	9	11	11	11	12
11	(Japan) K Niwa	7	11	11	5	12	16	8
4	(China) Lin GY	11	9	7	11	10	18	11

Quarterfinals
1	(China) Xu X	11	11	12	11
(China) Zhao ZH	8	3	10	8
13	(Japan) J Mizutani	6	7	8	13	11	11	6
4	(China) Lin GY	11	11	11	11	9	9	11

Semifinals
1	(China) Xu X	11	11	11	11
4	(China) Lin GY	6	6	4	8

=== Bottom half ===
First Round
3	(China) Ma L	15	11	13	11
(Germany) Qiu D	13	8	11	7
(China) Xu CH	11	11	12	11
15	(South Korea) Jang W-j	9	7	10	5
12	(South Korea) Lee S-s	7	14	9	11	10
(France) S Gauzy	11	16	11	7	12
(South Korea) Cho S-m	11	3	11	6	5	11	11
7	(China) Liang JK	7	11	9	11	11	9	9
5	(Japan) T Harimoto	11	5	11	6	8	5
(Chinese Taipei) Chuang C-y	9	11	6	11	11	11
(South Korea) Lim J-h	11	7	3	9
10	(Germany) D Ovtcharov	13	11	11	11
9	(Germany) T Boll	11	11	11	3	8	11
(Nigeria) Q Aruna	5	2	9	11	11	8
(Japan) S Togami	9	5	11	9	7
2	(China) Fan ZD	11	11	9	11	11

Second Round
3	(China) Ma L	7	11	11	11	11
(China) Xu CH	11	9	9	5	5
(France) S Gauzy	12	9	11	6	5
(South Korea) Cho S-m	14	11	6	11	11
(Chinese Taipei) Chuang C-y	11	12	18	9	11	6	10
10	(Germany) D Ovtcharov	8	14	16	11	3	11	12
9	(Germany) T Boll	9	7	11	9	11	9
2	(China) Fan ZD	11	11	8	11	4	11

Quarterfinals
3	(China) Ma L	11	11	11	11
(South Korea) Cho S-m	6	7	8	4
10	(Germany) D Ovtcharov	9	11	8	10	12	11	12
2	(China) Fan ZD	11	4	11	12	10	5	10

Semifinals
3	(China) Ma L	11	11	11	13	11	11
10	(Germany) D Ovtcharov	3	9	13	15	3	6

=== Finals ===
Semifinals								Final
1	(China) Xu Xin	11	11	11	11
4	(China) Lin Gaoyuan	6	6	4	8			1	(China) Xu Xin	15	11	11	11
3	(China) Ma Long	11	11	11	13	11	11	3	(China) Ma Long	13	8	7	5
10	(Germany) Dimitrij Ovtcharov	3	9	13	15	3	6

== Women's singles ==
=== Seeds ===
1. (China) Chen Meng (champion)
2. (China) Sun Yingsha (quarterfinals)
3. (China) Liu Shiwen (quarterfinals)
4. (Japan) Mima Ito (quarterfinals)
5. (China) Zhu Yuling (semifinals)
6. (China) Wang Manyu (semifinals)
7. (China) Ding Ning (final)
8. (Chinese Taipei) Cheng I-ching (first round)
9. (Singapore) Feng Tianwei (first round)
10. (Japan) Kasumi Ishikawa (second round)
11. (Japan) Miu Hirano (first round)
12. (China) Chen Xingtong (first round)
13. (China) He Zhuojia (second round)
14. (Austria) Sofia Polcanova (first round)
15. (Germany) Petrissa Solja (second round)
16. (Germany) Han Ying (first round)

=== Top half ===
First Round
1	(China) Chen M	12	11	10	7	11	15	11
(South Korea) Suh H-w	14	5	12	11	7	13	4
(China) Qian TY	11	11	11	11
11	(Japan) M Hirano	2	9	9	9
13	(China) He ZJ	11	6	11	11	11
(Chinese Taipei) Chen S-y	8	11	9	3	6
(China) Wang YD	6	11	11	11	11	11
8	(Chinese Taipei) Cheng I-c	11	5	7	2	13	9
5	(China) Zhu YL	11	9	11	8	11	5	12
(Russia) P Mikhaylova	9	11	7	11	6	11	10
(Singapore) Zeng J	11	5	9	8	8
15	(Germany) P Solja	9	11	11	11	11
14	(Austria) S Polcavna
(China) Zhang R	w	/	o
(Germany) Shan XN	8	10	5	5
3	(China) Liu SW	11	12	11	11

Second Round
1	(China) Chen M	11	10	11	11	11
(China) Qian TY	6	12	9	4	8
13	(China) He ZJ	10	5	6	5
(China) Wang YD	12	11	11	11
5	(China) Zhu YL	11	11	11	11
15	(Germany) P Solja	9	9	6	5
(China) Zhang R	11	9	3	9	6
3	(China) Liu SW	9	11	11	11	11

Quarterfinals
1	(China) Chen M	6	11	11	11	11
(China) Wang YD	11	8	1	5	6
5	(China) Zhu YL	11	11	11	11
3	(China) Liu SW	3	9	3	2

Semifinals
1	(China) Chen M	12	11	11	15
5	(China) Zhu YL	10	2	8	13

=== Bottom half ===
First Round
4	(Japan) M Ito	9	11	11	11	11
(Brazil) B Takahashi	11	7	9	9	9
(Japan) H Hashimoto	11	8	11	11	4	11
12	(China) Chen XT	7	11	3	4	11	7
9	(Singapore) Feng TW	12	7	11	11	5	9
(Japan) H Hayata	14	11	7	8	11	11
(China) Gu YT	6	6	7	3
7	(China) Ding N	11	11	11	11
6	(China) Wang MY	11	11	11	11
(South Korea) Choi H-j	7	1	3	5
(Japan) S Shibata	10	13	11	11	12
16	(Germany) Han Y	12	11	9	8	10
10	(Japan) K Ishikawa	11	11	11	13
(Monaco) Yang XX	7	6	6	11
(Hong Kong) Doo H K	4	2	7	6
2	(China) Sun YS	11	11	11	11

Second Round
4	(Japan) M Ito	11	11	11	9	11
(Japan) H Hashimoto	6	9	3	11	9
(Japan) H Hayata
7	(China) Ding N	w	/	o
6	(China) Wang MY	10	11	7	11	11	11
(Japan) S Shibata	12	7	11	8	5	8
10	(Japan) K Ishikawa	5	3	12	10
2	(China) Sun YS	11	11	14	12

Quarterfinals
4	(Japan) M Ito	7	13	12	8	5
7	(China) Ding N	11	11	14	11	11
6	(China) Wang MY	11	8	9	11	12	3	11
2	(China) Sun YS	6	11	11	8	10	11	8

Semifinals
7	(China) Ding N	2	9	11	11	11	11
6	(China) Wang MY	11	11	8	8	1	9

=== Finals ===
Semifinals								Final
1	(China) Chen Meng	12	11	11	15
5	(China) Zhu Yuling	10	2	8	13			1	(China) Chen Meng	3	11	11	11	11
7	(China) Ding Ning	2	9	11	11	11	11	7	(China) Ding Ning	11	1	7	3	1
6	(China) Wang Manyu	11	11	8	8	1	9

== Men's doubles ==
=== Seeds ===
1. (South Korea) Jeoung Young-sik / Lee Sang-su (semifinals)
2. (China) Lin Gaoyuan / Ma Long (final)
3. (Chinese Taipei) Liao Cheng-ting / Lin Yun-ju (first round)
4. (Germany) Benedikt Duda / Qiu Dang (first round)
5. (Chinese Taipei) Chen Chien-an / Chuang Chih-yuan (first round)
6. (Romania) Ovidiu Ionescu / (Spain) Álvaro Robles (first round)
7. (Austria) Robert Gardos / Daniel Habesohn (first round)
8. (Hungary) Nandor Ecseki / Adam Szudi (first round)

=== Draw ===
First Round
1	(South Korea) Jeoung Young-sik (South Korea) Lee Sang-su	11	11	8	12
(Germany) Timo Boll (Germany) Ricardo Walther	6	5	11	10
(China) Fan Zhendong (China) Zhou Yu	11	11	11
8	(Hungary) Nandor Ecseki (Hungary) Adam Szudi	5	4	4
7	(Austria) Robert Gardos (Austria) Daniel Habesohn	3	11	9	6
(Japan) Shunsuke Togami (Japan) Yukiya Uda	11	8	11	11
(South Korea) Cho Dae-seong (South Korea) Jang Woo-jin	10	11	6	12	13
3	(Chinese Taipei) Liao Cheng-ting (Chinese Taipei) Lin Yun-ju	12	6	11	10	11
4	(Germany) Benedikt Duda (Germany) Qiu Dang	11	5	7	8
(Poland) Jakub Dyjas (Belgium) Cedric Nuytinck	4	11	11	11
(Germany) Patrick Franziska (Germany) Dimitrij Ovtcharov	11	11	11
6	(Romania) Ovidu Ionescu (Spain) Álvaro Robles	9	1	3
5	(Chinese Taipei) Chen Chien-an (Chinese Taipei) Chuang Chih-yuan	12	3	11	12	7
(Belgium) Martin Allegro (Belgium) Florent Lambiet	14	11	9	10	11
(Hong Kong) Ho Kwan Kit (Hong Kong) Lam Siu Hang	8	6	5
2	(China) Lin Gaoyuan (China) Ma Long	11	11	11

Quarterfinals
1	(South Korea) Jeoung Young-sik (South Korea) Lee Sang-su	7	11	11	11
(China) Fan Zhendong (China) Zhou Yu	11	7	7	4
(Japan) Shunsuke Togami (Japan) Yukiya Uda	3	11	8	11	4
(South Korea) Cho Dae-seong (South Korea) Jang Woo-jin	11	9	11	8	11
(Poland) Jakub Dyjas (Belgium) Cedric Nuytinck	12	13	7	9	11
(Germany) Patrick Franziska (Germany) Dimitrij Ovtcharov	10	11	11	11	5
(Belgium) Martin Allegro (Belgium) Florent Lambiet	5	7	6
2	(China) Lin Gaoyuan (China) Ma Long	11	11	11

Semifinals
1	(South Korea) Jeoung Young-sik (South Korea) Lee Sang-su	8	5	11	3
(South Korea) Cho Dae-seong (South Korea) Jang Woo-jin	11	11	7	11
(Poland) Jakub Dyjas (Belgium) Cedric Nuytinck	9	10	11	11	6
2	(China) Lin Gaoyuan (China) Ma Long	11	12	6	6	11

Final
(South Korea) Cho Dae-seong (South Korea) Jang Woo-jin	10	15	12	14	11
2	(China) Lin Gaoyuan (China) Ma Long	12	13	14	12	6

== Women's doubles ==
=== Seeds ===
1. (China) Chen Meng / Wang Manyu (champion)
2. (Chinese Taipei) Chen Szu-yu / Cheng Hsien-tzu (quarterfinals)
3. (China) Ding Ning / Sun Yingsha (semifinals)
4. (Slovakia) Barbora Balážová / (Czech Republic) Hana Matelová (first round)
5. (Hong Kong) Lee Ho Ching / Minnie Soo Wai Yam (quarterfinals)
6. (Japan) Miu Hirano / Kasumi Ishikawa (final)
7. (Austria) Sofia Polcanova / (Romania) Bernadette Szőcs (first round)
8. (Germany) Nina Mittelham / Petrissa Solja (semifinals)

=== Draw ===
First Round
1	(China) Chen Meng (China) Wang Manyu	11	11	11
(Thailand) Nanthana Komwong (Thailand) Orawan Paranang	6	2	8
(Chinese Taipei) Huang Yu-wen (Chinese Taipei) Liu Hsing-yin	11	5	11	10	7
5	(Hong Kong) Lee Ho Ching (Hong Kong) Minnie Soo Wai Yam	9	11	8	12	11
8	(Germany) Nina Mittelham (Germany) Petrissa Solja	11	12	11
(Russia) Polina Mikhaylova (Russia) Yana Noskova	6	10	8
(South Korea) Choi Hyo-joo (South Korea) Shin Yu-bin	7	11	11	14
4	(Slovakia) Barbora Balážová (Czech Republic) Hana Matelová	11	8	9	12
3	(China) Ding Ning (China) Sun Yingsha	11	11	17
(Romania) Daniela Monteiro Dodean (Romania) Elizabeta Samara	5	6	15
(Singapore) Lin Ye (Singapore) Yu Mengyu	w	/	o
7	(Austria) Sofia Polcanova (Romania) Bernadette Szőcs
6	(Japan) Miu Hirano (Japan) Kasumi Ishikawa	11	11	9	11
(France) Laura Gasnier (France) Marie Migot	3	6	11	3
(Hong Kong) Doo Hoi Kem (Hong Kong) Zhu Chengzhu	2	11	14	8	8
2	(Chinese Taipei) Chen Szu-yu (Chinese Taipei) Cheng Hsien-tzu	11	9	12	11	11

Quarterfinals
1	(China) Chen Meng (China) Wang Manyu	11	11	11
5	(Hong Kong) Lee Ho Ching (Hong Kong) Minnie Soo Wai Yam	6	5	2
8	(Germany) Nina Mittelham (Germany) Petrissa Solja	16	4	13	11
(South Korea) Choi Hyo-joo (South Korea) Shin Yu-bin	14	11	11	9
3	(China) Ding Ning (China) Sun Yingsha	11	11	11
(Singapore) Lin Ye (Singapore) Yu Mengyu	5	9	7
6	(Japan) Miu Hirano (Japan) Kasumi Ishikawa	11	11	9	11
2	(Chinese Taipei) Chen Szu-yu (Chinese Taipei) Cheng Hsien-tzu	2	7	11	6

Semifinals
1	(China) Chen Meng (China) Wang Manyu	11	7	15	11
8	(Germany) Nina Mittelham (Germany) Petrissa Solja	4	11	13	4
3	(China) Ding Ning (China) Sun Yingsha	12	8	7	10
6	(Japan) Miu Hirano (Japan) Kasumi Ishikawa	10	11	11	12

Final
1	(China) Chen Meng (China) Wang Manyu	11	8	11	11
6	(Japan) Miu Hirano (Japan) Kasumi Ishikawa	7	11	7	8

== Mixed doubles ==
=== Seeds ===
1. (China) Xu Xin / Liu Shiwen (champions)
2. (Chinese Taipei) Lin Yun-ju / Cheng I-ching (semifinals)
3. (Hong Kong) Wong Chun Ting / Doo Hoi Kem (quarterfinals)
4. (Japan) Jun Mizutani / Mima Ito (final)
5. (Slovakia) Ľubomír Pištej / Barbora Balážová (quarterfinals)
6. (Hong Kong) Ho Kwan Kit / Lee Ho Ching (quarterfinals)
7. (Austria) Stefan Fegerl / Sofia Polcanova (first round)
8. (Germany) Patrick Franziska / Petrissa Solja (semifinals)

=== Draw ===
First Round
1	(China) Xu Xin (China) Liu Shiwen	11	11	11
(Hungary) Adam Szudi (Hungary) Szandra Pergel	6	5	5
(South Korea) Jang Woo-jin (South Korea) Shin Yu-bin	12	11	3	8
6	(Hong Kong) Ho Kwan Kit (Hong Kong) Lee Ho Ching	14	4	11	11
8	(Germany) Patrick Franziska (Germany) Petrissa Solja	11	11	11
(Slovakia) Wang Yang (Slovakia) Tatiana Kukulkova	6	7	4
(Romania) Ovidiu Ionescu (Romania) Bernadette Szőcs	12	4	8
3	(Hong Kong) Wong Chun Ting (Hong Kong) Doo Hoi Kem	14	11	11
4	(Japan) Jun Mizutani (Japan) Mima Ito	11	8	11	11
(China) Lin Gaoyuan (China) Sun Yingsha	8	11	8	9
(Spain) Álvaro Robles (Spain) María Xiao	7	11	11	7	11
7	(Austria) Stefan Fegerl (Austria) Sofia Polcanova	11	8	8	11	6
5	(Slovakia) Ľubomir Pištej (Slovakia) Barbora Balážová	11	9	11	5	11
(South Korea) Lee Sang-su (South Korea) Choi Hyo-joo	6	11	8	11	5
(Serbia) Aleksandar Karakašević (Serbia) Izabela Lupulesku	12	10	11	7
2	(Chinese Taipei) Lin Yun-ju (Chinese Taipei) Cheng I-ching	14	12	8	11

Quarterfinals
1	(China) Xu Xin (China) Liu Shiwen	11	11	11
6	(Hong Kong) Ho Kwan Kit (Hong Kong) Lee Ho Ching	5	5	8
8	(Germany) Patrick Franziska (Germany) Petrissa Solja	11	11	15
3	(Hong Kong) Wong Chun Ting (Hong Kong) Doo Hoi Kem	5	4	13
4	(Japan) Jun Mizutani (Japan) Mima Ito	w	/	o
(Spain) Álvaro Robles (Spain) María Xiao
5	(Slovakia) Ľubomir Pištej (Slovakia) Barbora Balážová	11	10	7	7
2	(Chinese Taipei) Lin Yun-ju (Chinese Taipei) Cheng I-ching	9	12	11	11

Semifinals
1	(China) Xu Xin (China) Liu Shiwen	11	10	11	9	11
8	(Germany) Patrick Franziska (Germany) Petrissa Solja	5	12	2	11	5
4	(Japan) Jun Mizutani (Japan) Mima Ito	11	11	11
2	(Chinese Taipei) Lin Yun-ju (Chinese Taipei) Cheng I-ching	2	8	7

Final
1	(China) Xu Xin (China) Liu Shiwen	12	13	7	11
4	(Japan) Jun Mizutani (Japan) Mima Ito	10	11	11	7
