= 2018 Swedish Open (table tennis) =

Tournament details
- Dates: 1–4 November 2018
- Competitors: 32S / 16D
- Total prize money: US$150,000
- Venue: Eriksdalshallen (Main venue); Skanstullshallen (Second venue)
- Location: Stockholm, Sweden

Champions
- Men's singles: (China) Fan Zhendong
- Women's singles: (Japan) Mima Ito
- Men's doubles: (Chinese Taipei) Liao Cheng-ting (Chinese Taipei) Lin Yun-ju
- Women's doubles: (China) Chen Xingtong (China) Sun Yingsha

The 2018 Swedish Open was the eleventh event of the 2018 ITTF World Tour. The event was organised by the Swedish Table Tennis Association, under the authority of the International Table Tennis Federation (ITTF). It took place from 1–4 November in Stockholm, Sweden.

== Men's singles ==
=== Seeds ===
1. (China) Fan Zhendong (champion)
2. (China) Xu Xin (final)
3. (China) Lin Gaoyuan (second round)
4. (Germany) Dimitrij Ovtcharov (quarterfinals)
5. (China) Ma Long (first round)
6. (Japan) Tomokazu Harimoto (first round)
7. (Hong Kong) Wong Chun Ting (first round)
8. (Japan) Koki Niwa (second round)
9. (Japan) Jun Mizutani (second round)
10. (France) Simon Gauzy (first round)
11. (Chinese Taipei) Chuang Chih-yuan (first round)
12. (Portugal) Marcos Freitas (first round)
13. (Germany) Patrick Franziska (first round)
14. (South Korea) Jeong Sang-eun (first round)
15. (Sweden) Mattias Falck (semifinals)
16. (Sweden) Kristian Karlsson (quarterfinals)

=== Draw ===
==== Top half ====
First round
1	(China) Fan Zhendong	12	11	11	7	11
(China) Liu Dingshuo	10	6	6	11	6
(China) Zhou Yu	11	11	11	11
13	(Germany) Patrick Franziska	8	6	8	8
12	(Portugal) Marcos Freitas	12	9	13	7
(China) Liang Jingkun	14	11	15	11
(Sweden) Jens Lundqvist	w/o
5	(China) Ma Long
8	(Japan) Koki Niwa	10	11	7	11	6	12	11
(Slovenia) Darko Jorgic	12	9	11	7	11	10	9
(Japan) Jin Ueda	9	13	11	10	6
16	(Sweden) Kristian Karlsson	11	15	8	12	11
15	(Sweden) Mattias Falck	11	7	11	9	11	7	11
(Sweden) Anton Kallberg	9	11	5	11	8	11	9
(Chinese Taipei) Chen Chien-An	8	11	13	9	11	8	8
3	(China) Lin Gaoyuan	11	8	11	11	9	11	11

Second round
1	(China) Fan Zhendong	11	11	11	11
(China) Zhou Yu	5	8	7	5
(China) Liang Jingkun	11	11	11	11
(Sweden) Jens Lundqvist	5	7	8	4
8	(Japan) Koki Niwa	6	11	11	9	14	2
16	(Sweden) Kristian Karlsson	11	5	9	11	16	11
15	(Sweden) Mattias Falck	7	11	14	9	11	11
3	(China) Lin Gaoyuan	11	7	12	11	7	8

Quarterfinals
1	(China) Fan Zhendong	10	11	11	11	11
(China) Liang Jingkun	12	5	8	6	5
16	(Sweden) Kristian Karlsson	14	7	8	11	6	10
15	(Sweden) Mattias Falck	12	11	11	7	11	12

Semifinals
1	(China) Fan Zhendong	11	11	11	11
15	(Sweden) Mattias Falck	4	5	4	8

==== Bottom half ====
First round
4	(Germany) Dimitrij Ovtcharov	13	11	11	13
(England) Liam Pitchford	11	7	4	11
(Chinese Taipei) Lin Yun-Ju	5	11	12	11	12
10	(France) Simon Gauzy	11	7	10	7	10
11	(Chinese Taipei) Chuang Chih-yuan	11	11	2	9	7	8
(China) Zhou Qihao	5	7	11	11	11	11
(Germany) Benedikt Duda	15	6	9	11	11	11
6	(Japan) Tomokazu Harimoto	13	11	11	7	8	7
7	(Hong Kong) Wong Chun Ting	7	12	11	11	12	7	10
(South Korea) Jang Woo-jin	11	10	9	7	14	11	12
(South Korea) Lim Jong-hoon	8	11	11	4	11	11
14	(South Korea) Jeong Sang-eun	11	9	9	11	2	8
9	(Japan) Jun Mizutani	11	10	11	11	12
(France) Can Akkuzu	8	12	6	3	10
(Austria) Robert Gardos	6	11	11	8	7	3
2	(China) Xu Xin	11	9	9	11	11	11

Second round
4	(Germany) Dimitrij Ovtcharov	11	11	11	7	11
(Chinese Taipei) Lin Yun-Ju	8	8	7	11	4
(China) Zhou Qihao	11	11	11	11
(Germany) Benedikt Duda	6	9	7	8
(South Korea) Jang Woo-jin	11	6	12	11	8	11	12
(South Korea) Lim Jong-hoon	8	11	14	4	11	6	10
9	(Japan) Jun Mizutani	7	11	7	5	11	6
2	(China) Xu Xin	11	3	11	7	9	11

Quarterfinals
4	(Germany) Dimitrij Ovtcharov	9	7	11	9	6
(China) Zhou Qihao	11	11	9	11	11
(South Korea) Jang Woo-jin	11	5	4	7	5
2	(China) Xu Xin	9	11	11	11	11

Semifinals
(China) Zhou Qihao	4	9	7	9
2	(China) Xu Xin	11	11	11	11

==== Finals ====
Semifinals						Final
1	(China) Fan Zhendong	11	11	11	11
15	(Sweden) Mattias Falck	4	5	4	8	1	(China) Fan Zhendong	11	14	13	9	11
	(China) Zhou Qihao	4	9	7	9	2	(China) Xu Xin	7	12	11	11	9
2	(China) Xu Xin	11	11	11	11

== Women's singles ==
=== Seeds ===
1. (China) Zhu Yuling (final)
2. (China) Liu Shiwen (quarterfinals)
3. (China) Chen Meng (semifinals)
4. (Japan) Kasumi Ishikawa (quarterfinals)
5. (China) Wang Manyu (quarterfinals)
6. (China) Ding Ning (semifinals)
7. (Japan) Mima Ito (champion)
8. (Chinese Taipei) Cheng I-ching (first round)
9. (Japan) Miu Hirano (first round)
10. (China) Chen Xingtong (second round)
11. (Singapore) Feng Tianwei (second round)
12. (South Korea) Seo Hyo-won (second round)
13. (Hong Kong) Doo Hoi Kem (first round)
14. (Japan) Hitomi Sato (second round)
15. (Sweden) Matilda Ekholm (first round)
16. (Sweden) Linda Bergstrom (first round)

=== Draw ===
==== Top half ====
First round
1	(China) Zhu Yuling	11	11	11	7	11
(Japan) Saki Shibata	5	9	4	11	3
(China) Liu Gaoyang	9	11	11	11	8	8	18
15	(Sweden) Matilda Ekholm	11	4	9	2	11	11	16
13	(Hong Kong) Doo Hoi Kem	9	5	10	11	11	9
(Monaco) Yang Xiaoxin	11	11	12	8	7	11
(Japan) Miyu Kato	11	11	11	11
8	(Chinese Taipei) Cheng I-ching	5	9	8	5
5	(China) Wang Manyu	7	13	11	9	11	11
(Germany) Han Ying	11	11	8	11	5	9
(North Korea) Kim Song-i	8	11	13	3	11	4
14	(Japan) Hitomi Sato	11	9	11	11	13	11
12	(South Korea) Seo Hyo-won	11	12	11	4	11
(Slovenia) Barbora Balazova	7	10	3	11	7
(Japan) Hina Hayata	4	16	10	4	11	9
3	(China) Chen Meng	11	14	12	11	6	11

Second round
1	(China) Zhu Yuling	12	11	11	11
(China) Liu Gaoyang	10	6	4	4
(Monaco) Yang Xiaoxin	11	8	9	4
(Japan) Miyu Kato	13	11	11	11
5	(China) Wang Manyu	9	5	11	11	11	9	11
14	(Japan) Hitomi Sato	11	11	7	6	6	11	5
12	(South Korea) Seo Hyo-won	5	7	5	9
3	(China) Chen Meng	11	11	11	11

Quarterfinals
1	(China) Zhu Yuling	11	11	11	10	18
(Japan) Miyu Kato	8	7	4	12	16
5	(China) Wang Manyu	3	11	11	6	9	4
3	(China) Chen Meng	11	9	9	11	11	11

Semifinals
1	(China) Zhu Yuling	12	11	11	5	10	11
3	(China) Chen Meng	10	2	6	11	12	7

==== Bottom half ====
First round
4	(Japan) Kasumi Ishikawa	10	11	11	11	11
(Japan) Honoka Hashimoto	12	8	6	5	8
(Hong Kong) Lee Ho Ching	11	11	11	11
16	(Sweden) Linda Bergstrom	6	5	6	8
10	(China) Chen Xingtong	11	11	8	11	11
(South Korea) Jeon Ji-hee	5	5	11	7	9
(China) Wang Yidi	10	6	8	11	11	5
6	(China) Ding Ning	12	11	11	7	8	11
7	(Japan) Mima Ito	11	11	6	11	11
(China) Zhang Qiang	9	4	11	3	8
(Hong Kong) Soo Wai Yam Minnie	6	6	11	9	3
11	(Singapore) Feng Tianwei	11	11	5	11	11
9	(Japan) Miu Hirano	12	1	9	15	9
(Germany) Petrissa Solja	14	11	11	13	11
(Hong Kong) Ng Wing Nam	6	8	11	5	8
2	(China) Liu Shiwen	11	11	8	11	11

Second round
4	(Japan) Kasumi Ishikawa	11	11	11	11
(Hong Kong) Lee Ho Ching	6	4	9	8
10	(China) Chen Xingtong	11	11	8	5	9	7
6	(China) Ding Ning	6	4	11	11	11	11
7	(Japan) Mima Ito	2	9	12	11	5	11	11
11	(Singapore) Feng Tianwei	11	11	10	6	11	5	9
(Germany) Petrissa Solja	7	10	15	9
2	(China) Liu Shiwen	11	12	17	11

Quarterfinals
4	(Japan) Kasumi Ishikawa	13	12	10	6	4	5
6	(China) Ding Ning	11	10	12	11	11	11
7	(Japan) Mima Ito	12	7	7	5	13	11	11
2	(China) Liu Shiwen	10	11	11	11	11	4	8

Semifinals
6	(China) Ding Ning	11	11	10	6	9	8
7	(Japan) Mima Ito	3	7	12	11	11	11

==== Finals ====
Semifinals								Final
1	(China) Zhu Yuling	12	11	11	5	10	11
3	(China) Chen Meng	10	2	6	11	12	7	1	(China) Zhu Yuling	3	3	5	8
6	(China) Ding Ning	11	11	10	6	9	8	7	(Japan) Mima Ito	11	11	11	11
7	(Japan) Mima Ito	3	7	12	11	11	11

== Men's doubles ==
=== Seeds ===
1. (Hong Kong) Ho Kwan Kit / Wong Chun Ting (quarterfinals)
2. (China) Ma Long / Xu Xin (first round)
3. (China) Fan Zhendong / Liang Jingkun (first round)
4. (Chinese Taipei) Liao Cheng-ting / Lin Yun-ju (champions)
5. (Sweden) Mattias Falck / Kristian Karlsson (final)
6. (Germany) Ruwen Filus / Ricardo Walther (first round)
7. (Chinese Taipei) Chen Chien-an / Chuang Chih-yuan (first round)
8. (Japan) Tomokazu Harimoto / Yuto Kizukuri (quarterfinals)

=== Draw ===
First round
1	(Hong Kong) Ho / Wong	12	14	11	11
(North Korea) An / (South Korea) Lim	14	12	7	4
(Iran) Alamian / Alamian	4	8	7
5	(Sweden) Falck / Karlsson	11	11	11
6	(Germany) Filus / Walther	10	6	1
(South Korea) An / Cho	12	11	11
(Sweden) Kallberg / Moregard	4	11	11	7	11
3	(China) Fan / Liang	11	8	8	11	8
4	(Chinese Taipei) Liao / Lin	11	11	7	11
(Thailand) Tanviriyavechakul / Wisutmaythangkoon	5	8	11	8
(North Korea) Ham / (South Korea) Jang	11	11	11
7	(Chinese Taipei) Chen / Chuang	6	5	8
8	(Japan) Harimoto / Kizukuri	w/o
(Sweden) Gerell / Persson
(England) Drinkhall / Pitchford
2	(China) Ma / Xu	inj

Quarterfinals
1	(Hong Kong) Ho / Wong	8	8	15	9
5	(Sweden) Falck / Karlsson	11	11	13	11
(South Korea) An / Cho	11	4	7	9
(Sweden) Kallberg / Moregard	4	11	11	11
4	(Chinese Taipei) Liao / Lin	11	2	11	11
(North Korea) Ham / (South Korea) Jang	6	11	7	8
8	(Japan) Harimoto / Kizukuri	13	14	6	11	10
(England) Drinkhall / Pitchford	11	16	11	9	12

Semifinals
5	(Sweden) Falck / Karlsson	12	6	6	12	11
(Sweden) Kallberg / Moregard	10	11	11	10	6
4	(Chinese Taipei) Liao / Lin	5	13	12	11
(England) Drinkhall / Pitchford	11	11	10	8

Final
5	(Sweden) Falck / Karlsson	12	8	8	11	11
4	(Chinese Taipei) Liao / Lin	10	11	11	6	13

== Women's doubles ==
=== Seeds ===
1. (South Korea) Jeon Ji-hee / Yang Ha-eun (semifinals)
2. (Japan) Honoka Hashimoto / Hitomi Sato (quarterfinals)
3. (Hong Kong) Doo Hoi Kem / Lee Ho Ching (quarterfinals)
4. (Japan) Kasumi ishikawa / Mima Ito (quarterfinals)
5. (China) Chen Ke / Wang Manyu (semifinals)
6. (Hong Kong) Ng Wing Nam / Soo Wai Yam Minnie (first round)
7. (China) Chen Xingtong / Sun Yingsha (champions)
8. (Sweden) Matilda Ekholm / Li Fen (first round)

=== Draw ===
First round
1	(South Korea) Jeon / Yang	11	11	11
(Singapore) Lin / Yu	8	5	9
(North Korea) Kim / (South Korea) Seo	9	11	11	6	11
6	(Hong Kong) Ng / Soo	11	8	6	11	3
8	(Sweden) Ekholm / Li	11	6	7	7
(China) Liu / Zhang	9	11	11	11
(North Korea) Kim / (South Korea) Choi	5	9	9
3	(Hong Kong) Doo / Lee	11	11	11
4	(Japan) Ishikawa / Ito	12	11	11
(India) Batra / Kamath	10	4	1
(Slovakia) Balážová / (Czech Republic) Matelová	11	5	11	12
5	(China) Chen / Wang	13	11	8	14
7	(China) Chen / Sun	11	11	11	6	13
(Germany) Solja / Winter	8	13	5	11	11
(Croatia) Sun / (Singapore) Zeng	5	8	8
2	(Japan) Hashimoto / Sato	11	11	11

Quarterfinals
1	(South Korea) Jeon / Yang	13	11	8	11
(North Korea) Kim / (South Korea) Seo	11	6	11	9
(China) Liu / Zhang	11	11	11
3	(Hong Kong) Doo / Lee	4	9	7
4	(Japan) Ishikawa / Ito	10	9	5
5	(China) Chen / Wang	12	11	11
7	(China) Chen / Sun	11	12	12	7	11
2	(Japan) Hashimoto / Sato	3	10	14	11	9

Semifinals
1	(South Korea) Jeon / Yang	4	11	13	5	6
(China) Liu / Zhang	11	5	11	11	11
5	(China) Chen / Wang	9	9	11	4
7	(China) Chen / Sun	11	11	4	11

Final
(China) Liu / Zhang	5	11	7	6
7	(China) Chen / Sun	11	9	11	11
