= Table tennis at the 2018 Asian Games – Women's team =

Women's team at the 2018 Asian Games
- Venue: Jakarta International Expo
- Date: 26–28 August 2018
- Competitors: 77 from 17 nations

Medalists
gold medal	China; Chen Meng, Chen Xingtong, Sun Yingsha, Wang Manyu, Zhu Yuling
silver medal	North Korea; Cha Hyo-sim, Choe Hyon-hwa, Kim Nam-hae, Kim Song-i, Pyon Song-gyong
bronze medal	South Korea; Choi Hyo-joo, Jeon Ji-hee, Kim Ji-ho, Suh Hyo-won, Yang Ha-eun
bronze medal	Hong Kong; Doo Hoi Kem, Lee Ho Ching, Li Ching Wan, Ng Wing Nam, Minnie Soo

The women's team table tennis event at the 2018 Asian Games took place from 26 to 28 August 2018 at the Jakarta International Expo. Team ranking was based on the ITTF world team ranking of August 2018.

== Schedule ==
All times are Western Indonesia Time (UTC+07:00)

Date	Time	Event
Sunday, 26 August 2018	10:00	Preliminary round 1
Sunday, 26 August 2018	14:00	Preliminary round 2
Sunday, 26 August 2018	18:00	Preliminary round 3
Monday, 27 August 2018	10:00	Preliminary round 4
Monday, 27 August 2018	14:00	Preliminary round 5
Monday, 27 August 2018	18:00	Quarterfinals
Tuesday, 28 August 2018	10:00	Semifinals
Tuesday, 28 August 2018	16:00	Final

== Results ==
=== Preliminary round ===
==== Group A ====
Pos	Team	Pld	W	L	MF	MA	Pts	Qualification
1	China	3	3	0	9	0	6	Quarterfinals
2	India	3	2	1	6	4	5	Quarterfinals
3	Iran	3	1	2	4	6	4	
4	Qatar	3	0	3	0	9	3	

Source: ATTU

26 August	Iran	0–3	China

Mahshid Ashtari	0–3	Chen Meng	5–11, 4–11, 3–11
Neda Shahsavari	0–3	Chen Xingtong	3–11, 8–11, 9–11
Maryam Samet	0–3	Sun Yingsha	4–11, 7–11, 1–11

26 August	India	3–0	Qatar

Mouma Das	3–0	Maha Ali	11–3, 11–2, 11–4
Ayhika Mukherjee	3–1	Aya Majdi	11–2, 10–12, 11–2, 11–3
Sutirtha Mukherjee	3–0	Maha Faramarzi	11–3, 11–3, 11–6

26 August	India	0–3	China

Ayhika Mukherjee	1–3	Chen Meng	8–11, 11–8, 12–14, 9–11
Manika Batra	0–3	Zhu Yuling	5–11, 6–11, 10–12
Madhurika Patkar	0–3	Wang Manyu	4–11, 4–11, 2–11

26 August	Qatar	0–3	Iran

Aya Majdi	0–3	Mahshid Ashtari	3–11, 7–11, 2–11
Maha Ali	0–3	Neda Shahsavari	4–11, 3–11, 3–11
Maha Faramarzi	1–3	Saba Safari	11–13, 11–9, 8–11, 1–11

26 August	Qatar	0–3	China

Aya Majdi	0–3	Wang Manyu	3–11, 2–11, 5–11
Maryam Ali	0–3	Sun Yingsha	1–11, 1–11, 1–11
Maha Faramarzi	0–3	Chen Xingtong	1–11, 3–11, 1–11

26 August	India	3–1	Iran

Manika Batra	3–0	Mahshid Ashtari	11–6, 11–4, 11–3
Ayhika Mukherjee	2–3	Neda Shahsavari	10–12, 11–9, 9–11, 11–4, 5–11
Mouma Das	3–0	Maryam Samet	11–7, 11–8, 11–7
Manika Batra	3–2	Neda Shahsavari	11–7, 5–11, 12–14, 14–12, 11–1

==== Group B ====
Pos	Team	Pld	W	L	MF	MA	Pts	Qualification
1	North Korea	3	3	0	9	3	6	Quarterfinals
2	Japan	3	2	1	8	3	5	Quarterfinals
3	Thailand	3	1	2	4	6	4	
4	Mongolia	3	0	3	0	9	3	

Source: ATTU

26 August	Thailand	0–3	Japan

Suthasini Sawettabut	0–3	Minami Ando	7–11, 9–11, 7–11
Orawan Paranang	1–3	Miyu Kato	6–11, 16–14, 7–11, 10–12
Nanthana Komwong	0–3	Miyu Maeda	8–11, 5–11, 4–11

26 August	North Korea	3–0	Mongolia

Kim Song-i	3–0	Batmönkhiin Bolor-Erdene	11–4, 11–2, 11–2
Cha Hyo-sim	3–0	Batbayaryn Doljinzuu	11–0, 11–4, 11–6
Kim Nam-hae	3–0	Mönkhbatyn Undram	11–1, 11–5, 11–4

26 August	Japan	2–3	North Korea

Miyu Kato	3–1	Cha Hyo-sim	7–11, 11–2, 13–11, 14–12
Minami Ando	3–1	Kim Song-i	4–11, 11–6, 11–9, 11–7
Miyu Maeda	2–3	Kim Nam-hae	8–11, 8–11, 16–14, 11–8, 5–11
Miyu Kato	2–3	Kim Song-i	8–11, 4–11, 11–4, 11–6, 9–11
Minami Ando	1–3	Cha Hyo-sim	4–11, 10–12, 11–7, 10–12

26 August	Mongolia	0–3	Thailand

Mönkhbatyn Undram	0–3	Tamolwan Khetkhuan	6–11, 7–11, 1–11
Batbayaryn Doljinzuu	0–3	Suthasini Sawettabut	3–11, 4–11, 6–11
Batmönkhiin Bolor-Erdene	0–3	Orawan Paranang	4–11, 5–11, 12–14

26 August	Mongolia	0–3	Japan

Batmönkhiin Bolor-Erdene	0–3	Minami Ando	3–11, 3–11, 6–11
Mönkhbatyn Undram	0–3	Miyu Kato	4–11, 4–11, 6–11
Batbayaryn Doljinzuu	0–3	Misaki Morizono	3–11, 6–11, 7–11

26 August	North Korea	3–1	Thailand

Kim Song-i	3–0	Orawan Paranang	11–2, 11–5, 11–7
Cha Hyo-sim	2–3	Suthasini Sawettabut	11–6, 8–11, 11–6, 10–12, 9–11
Kim Nam-hae	3–2	Tamolwan Khetkhuan	12–10, 11–5, 9–11, 11–13, 11–7
Kim Song-i	3–1	Suthasini Sawettabut	11–3, 8–11, 11–2, 11–3

==== Group C ====
Pos	Team	Pld	W	L	MF	MA	Pts	Qualification
1	South Korea	3	3	0	9	1	6	Quarterfinals
2	Chinese Taipei	3	2	1	7	4	5	Quarterfinals
3	Indonesia	3	1	2	4	6	4	
4	Macau	3	0	3	0	9	3	

Source: ATTU

26 August	South Korea	3–0	Indonesia

Suh Hyo-won	3–0	Kharisma Nur Hawwa	11–7, 11–5, 11–8
Jeon Ji-hee	3–0	Rina Sintya	12–10, 11–6, 11–5
Yang Ha-eun	3–0	Gustin Dwi Jayanti	11–6, 11–7, 11–7

26 August	Chinese Taipei	3–0	Macau

Cheng I-ching	3–0	Wong Choi Chi	11–6, 11–3, 12–10
Liu Hsing-yin	3–0	Cheong Cheng I	11–5, 11–5, 11–9
Chen Szu-yu	3–0	Tam Sut Fei	11–3, 11–3, 11–3

26 August	Chinese Taipei	1–3	South Korea

Cheng I-ching	3–1	Suh Hyo-won	11–3, 7–11, 11–8, 15–13
Chen Szu-yu	2–3	Jeon Ji-hee	11–5, 7–11, 6–11, 11–7, 5–11
Liu Hsing-yin	0–3	Yang Ha-eun	6–11, 9–11, 9–11
Cheng I-ching	1–3	Jeon Ji-hee	13–11, 8–11, 8–11, 5–11

26 August	Indonesia	3–0	Macau

Rina Sintya	3–0	Chong Weng I	11–7, 11–9, 11–4
Kharisma Nur Hawwa	3–1	Wong Choi Chi	11–7, 11–5, 2–11, 11–9
Lilis Indriani	3–2	Cheong Cheng I	9–11, 11–3, 9–11, 11–8, 11–9

26 August	South Korea	3–0	Macau

Suh Hyo-won	3–0	U Sio Mei	11–3, 11–5, 11–7
Choi Hyo-joo	3–0	Wong Choi Chi	11–3, 11–2, 11–7
Kim Ji-ho	3–0	Chong Weng I	11–1, 11–4, 11–2

26 August	Indonesia	1–3	Chinese Taipei

Kharisma Nur Hawwa	0–3	Chen Szu-yu	9–11, 4–11, 7–11
Atikah Dwi Rahayu	0–3	Cheng Hsien-tzu	3–11, 5–11, 5–11
Rina Sintya	3–1	Lin Chia-hui	11–9, 11–9, 9–11, 11–9
Kharisma Nur Hawwa	0–3	Cheng Hsien-tzu	5–11, 7–11, 9–11

==== Group D ====
Pos	Team	Pld	W	L	MF	MA	Pts	Qualification
1	Hong Kong	4	4	0	12	1	8	Quarterfinals
2	Singapore	4	3	1	10	3	7	Quarterfinals
3	Malaysia	4	2	2	6	8	6	
4	Vietnam	4	1	3	5	9	5	
5	Nepal	4	0	4	0	12	4	

Source: ATTU

26 August	Vietnam	0–3	Hong Kong

Mai Hoàng Mỹ Trang	0–3	Minnie Soo	9–11, 5–11, 5–11
Nguyễn Thị Nga	0–3	Doo Hoi Kem	3–11, 1–11, 5–11
Nguyễn Khoa Diệu Khánh	0–3	Lee Ho Ching	4–11, 3–11, 6–11

26 August	Malaysia	3–0	Nepal

Ho Ying	3–0	Swechchha Nembang	11–8, 11–2, 13–11
Alice Chang	3–0	Nabita Shrestha	14–12, 11–9, 11–5
Karen Lyne	3–1	Rabina Maharjan	11–4, 11–5, 12–14, 11–4

26 August	Malaysia	0–3	Hong Kong

Alice Chang	0–3	Minnie Soo	2–11, 7–11, 5–11
Karen Lyne	0–3	Doo Hoi Kem	8–11, 8–11, 4–11
Ho Ying	0–3	Lee Ho Ching	9–11, 3–11, 7–11

26 August	Singapore	3–0	Nepal

Feng Tianwei	3–0	Swechchha Nembang	11–3, 11–6, 11–4
Yu Mengyu	3–1	Nabita Shrestha	11–3, 11–2, 8–11, 11–6
Lin Ye	3–0	Rabina Maharjan	11–2, 11–3, 11–5

26 August	Singapore	1–3	Hong Kong

Feng Tianwei	2–3	Lee Ho Ching	12–14, 11–9, 7–11, 11–6, 8–11
Lin Ye	2–3	Doo Hoi Kem	12–10, 2–11, 5–11, 11–7, 8–11
Yu Mengyu	3–1	Minnie Soo	11–8, 11–3, 7–11, 11–4
Feng Tianwei	1–3	Doo Hoi Kem	11–6, 9–11, 12–14, 7–11

26 August	Vietnam	2–3	Malaysia

Nguyễn Thị Nga	1–3	Ho Ying	5–11, 7–11, 11–7, 10–12
Phan Hoàng Tường Giang	1–3	Alice Chang	5–11, 11–9, 11–13, 7–11
Mai Hoàng Mỹ Trang	3–2	Karen Lyne	6–11, 8–11, 11–4, 11–7, 11–3
Nguyễn Thị Nga	3–1	Alice Chang	11–9, 6–11, 11–9, 11–8
Phan Hoàng Tường Giang	0–3	Ho Ying	10–12, 9–11, 2–11

27 August	Nepal	0–3	Hong Kong

Nabita Shrestha	0–3	Li Ching Wan	7–11, 3–11, 8–11
Swechchha Nembang	0–3	Ng Wing Nam	4–11, 2–11, 4–11
Rabina Maharjan	0–3	Minnie Soo	6–11, 1–11, 1–11

27 August	Singapore	3–0	Vietnam

Yu Mengyu	3–0	Nguyễn Khoa Diệu Khánh	11–9, 11–8, 11–4
Lin Ye	3–2	Mai Hoàng Mỹ Trang	10–12, 6–11, 11–8, 14–12, 11–3
Feng Tianwei	3–0	Phan Hoàng Tường Giang	11–3, 11–3, 11–6

27 August	Vietnam	3–0	Nepal

Phan Hoàng Tường Giang	3–0	Swechchha Nembang	11–8, 11–8, 11–4
Nguyễn Thị Nga	3–1	Nabita Shrestha	11–6, 11–2, 11–13, 11–9
Nguyễn Khoa Diệu Khánh	3–0	Rabina Maharjan	11–6, 11–5, 11–4

27 August	Malaysia	0–3	Singapore

Ho Ying	1–3	Lin Ye	11–6, 7–11, 10–12, 6–11
Karen Lyne	2–3	Yu Mengyu	6–11, 7–11, 11–8, 13–11, 12–14
Alice Chang	0–3	Feng Tianwei	2–11, 1–11, 6–11

=== Knockout round ===
Quarterfinals
A1	China	3
Japan	0
Singapore	1
C1	South Korea	3
D1	Hong Kong	3
India	1
Chinese Taipei	1
B1	North Korea	3

Semifinals
A1	China	3
C1	South Korea	0
D1	Hong Kong	0
B1	North Korea	3

Final
A1	China	3
B1	North Korea	0

==== Quarterfinals ====
27 August	Japan	0–3	China

Miyu Kato	1–3	Wang Manyu	11–5, 7–11, 6–11, 9–11
Minami Ando	1–3	Chen Meng	6–11, 11–8, 9–11, 6–11
Miyu Maeda	0–3	Zhu Yuling	6–11, 3–11, 12–14

27 August	Singapore	1–3	South Korea

Feng Tianwei	3–1	Suh Hyo-won	9–11, 11–6, 11–9, 11–7
Yu Mengyu	1–3	Jeon Ji-hee	11–9, 10–12, 9–11, 11–13
Lin Ye	0–3	Yang Ha-eun	6–11, 11–13, 3–11
Feng Tianwei	0–3	Jeon Ji-hee	8–11, 8–11, 8–11

27 August	India	1–3	Hong Kong

Manika Batra	3–1	Lee Ho Ching	11–9, 11–9, 5–11, 11–6
Ayhika Mukherjee	1–3	Doo Hoi Kem	14–12, 4–11, 10–12, 8–11
Mouma Das	2–3	Minnie Soo	6–11, 13–11, 11–8, 3–11, 5–11
Manika Batra	0–3	Doo Hoi Kem	8–11, 8–11, 11–13

27 August	Chinese Taipei	1–3	North Korea

Cheng I-ching	3–1	Cha Hyo-sim	11–5, 11–8, 8–11, 13–11
Chen Szu-yu	0–3	Kim Song-i	4–11, 8–11, 5–11
Cheng Hsien-tzu	2–3	Kim Nam-hae	11–13, 11–9, 11–7, 8–11, 9–11
Cheng I-ching	0–3	Kim Song-i	4–11, 9–11, 5–11

==== Semifinals ====
28 August	China	3–0	South Korea

Zhu Yuling	3–1	Jeon Ji-hee	11–7, 11–5, 7–11, 11–5
Chen Meng	3–0	Choi Hyo-joo	11–8, 11–6, 11–8
Wang Manyu	3–1	Suh Hyo-won	11–7, 3–11, 11–9, 11–6

28 August	North Korea	3–0	Hong Kong

Kim Song-i	3–1	Lee Ho Ching	12–10, 11–2, 4–11, 11–6
Cha Hyo-sim	3–2	Doo Hoi Kem	11–8, 7–11, 11–8, 7–11, 14–12
Kim Nam-hae	3–2	Minnie Soo	11–9, 10–12, 11–3, 9–11, 11–6

==== Final ====
28 August	North Korea	0–3	China

Kim Song-i	0–3	Zhu Yuling	9–11, 8–11, 6–11
Cha Hyo-sim	0–3	Chen Meng	6–11, 8–11, 12–14
Kim Nam-hae	1–3	Wang Manyu	11–8, 5–11, 4–11, 7–11

== Non-participating athletes ==
- Tee Ai Xin (MAS)
- Choe Hyon-hwa (PRK)
- Pyon Song-gyong (PRK)
- Shouq Saad (QAT)
- Pearlyn Koh (SGP)
- Zhang Wanling (SGP)
- Jinnipa Sawettabut (THA)
