= Shin Yu-bin =

South Korean table tennis player (born 2004)

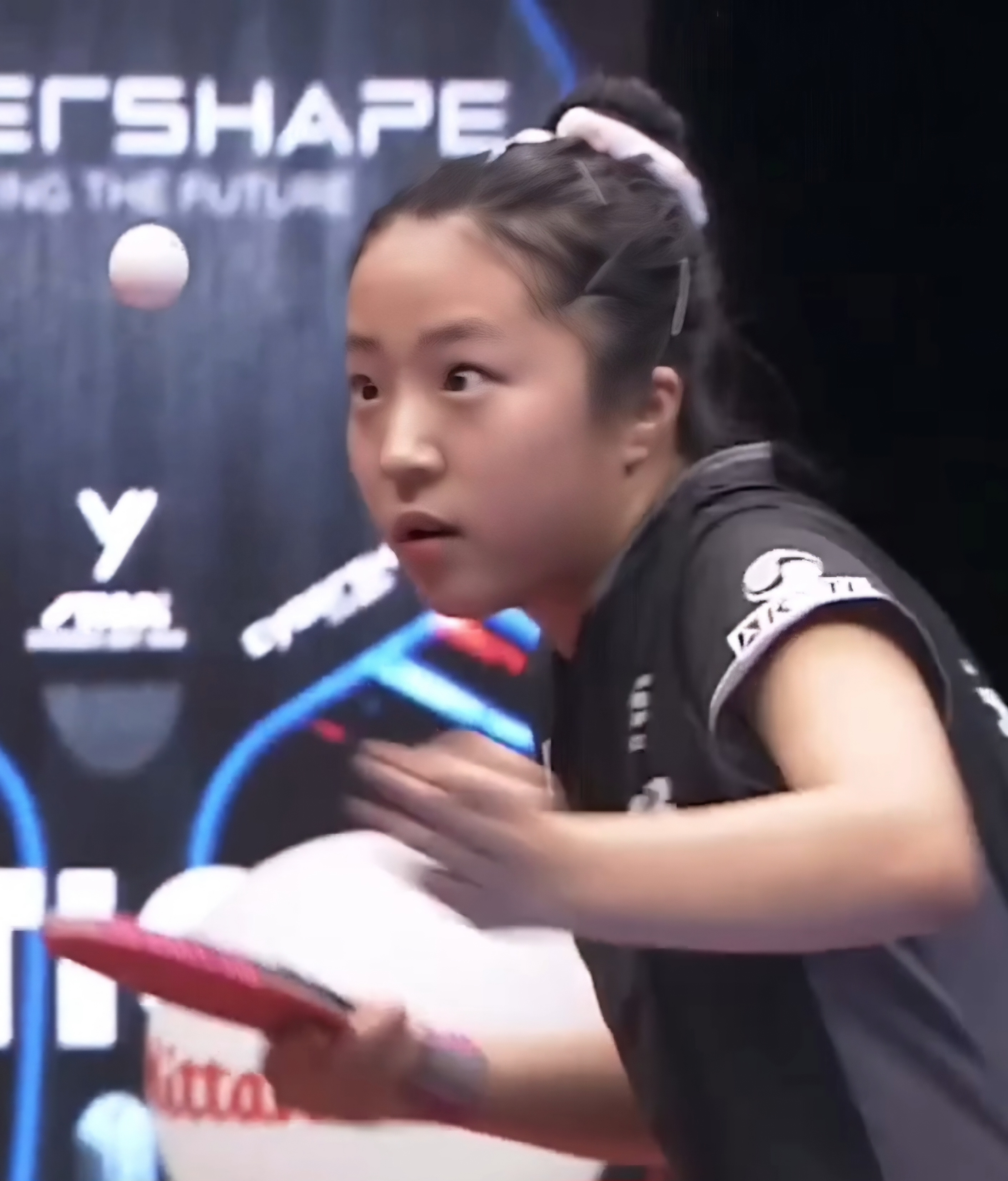
- Shin in 2023

Personal information
- Born: 5 July 2004 (age 22) Suwon, Gyeonggi Province, South Korea
- Height: 169 cm (5 ft 7 in)

Sport
- Sport: Table tennis
- Playing style: Right-handed, shakehand grip
- Highest ranking: 7 (5 March 2024)
- Current ranking: 12 (5 October 2026)
Medal record
Women's table tennis
Representing South Korea
Olympic Games
Bronze medal – third place	2024 Paris	Mixed doubles
Bronze medal – third place	2024 Paris	Team
World Championships
Silver medal – second place	2023 Durban	Doubles
Bronze medal – third place	2025 Doha	Doubles
Bronze medal – third place	2025 Doha	Mixed doubles
World Cup
Silver medal – second place	2023 Chengdu	Mixed team
Silver medal – second place	2024 Chengdu	Mixed team
Bronze medal – third place	2019 Tokyo	Team
Bronze medal – third place	2026 Macau	Singles
Asian Games
Gold medal – first place	2022 Hangzhou	Doubles
Bronze medal – third place	2022 Hangzhou	Singles
Bronze medal – third place	2022 Hangzhou	Mixed doubles
Bronze medal – third place	2022 Hangzhou	Team
Bronze medal – third place	2026 Aichi-Nagoya	Mixed doubles
Bronze medal – third place	2026 Aichi-Nagoya	Team
Asian Championships
Gold medal – first place	2021 Doha	Doubles
Silver medal – second place	2021 Doha	Singles
Silver medal – second place	2021 Doha	Team
Silver medal – second place	2023 Pyeongchang	Team
Bronze medal – third place	2023 Pyeongchang	Doubles
Bronze medal – third place	2023 Pyeongchang	Mixed doubles
Bronze medal – third place	2024 Astana	Mixed doubles
Bronze medal – third place	2025 Bhubaneswar	Team

Korean name
- Hangul: 신유빈
- Hanja: 申裕斌
- RR: Sin Yubin
- MR: Sin Yubin

Shin Yu-bin (Korean: 신유빈; born 5 July 2004) is a South Korean table tennis player.

Her father, a former table tennis player, operated a table tennis club, and she naturally started playing the sport around the age of four or five. She showed early promise and was regarded as a table tennis prodigy during her elementary school years, joining the national reserve team. In 2019, at the age of 14 years, 11 months, and 16 days, she became the youngest player ever selected for the South Korean national team. Since then, she has established herself as one of the leading figures in South Korean table tennis in the 2020s.

== Career ==
=== 2019 ===
She competed in the 2019 ITTF World Tour Grand Finals in the mixed doubles event with Cho Dae-seong. They were knocked out in the quarterfinals by Xu Xin and Liu Shiwen, 0–3. She also participated in the 2019 Asian Table Tennis Championships in both the women's singles and the mixed doubles, winning against the much higher ranked Cheng I-ching in the round of 32, 3–2, but lost to Feng Tianwei in the round of 16, 0–3 in the women's singles. In the mixed doubles, she competed with Cho Dae-seong. They were knocked out in the quarterfinals by Wang Chuqin and Sun Yingsha, 1–3. Also in 2019, she won the mixed doubles with Cho Dae-seong in the Czech Open, becoming the youngest person to win a mixed doubles title in the ITTF World Tour at 15 years, 50 days. They won against Jun Mizutani and Mima Ito in the finals, 3–2.

=== 2021 ===
Shin was named to the South Korean Olympic team on 4 February 2021. She was 17 at the 2020 Summer Olympics in Tokyo, making her the youngest ever Korean Olympic table tennis player, breaking a record previously held by Ryu Seung-min.

During the 2021 World Table Tennis Championships held in Houston, United States, Shin Yu-bin sustained a right wrist injury. She competed in the women's doubles event but was forced to withdraw from the women's singles event before her first match due to worsening pain. Upon returning to South Korea, medical examinations revealed tendon damage in her wrist, requiring surgery and a long rehabilitation period. As a result, she missed several months of competition before making a comeback in 2022.

=== 2022 ===
Shin Yubin won her first WTT singles title at the WTT Contender Nova Gorica 2022 after defeating Yang Xiaoxin 4–3 in the final. She also won the mixed doubles title with Lim Jong-hoon, completing a double victory at the tournament.

=== 2023 ===
Shin was selected for the South Korean national Asian Games team in the table tennis event at the 2022 Asian Games, which runs from September 22 to October 2, 2023. Shin Yubin competed in four events and won a medal in each. She won bronze in the women’s singles, bronze in the women’s team event with Jeon Ji-hee, Suh Hyo-won, Lee Eun-hye, and Yang Ha-eun, bronze in the mixed doubles with Lim Jong-hoon, and gold in the women’s doubles with Jeon Ji-hee. The women double final was the inter-Korean match. The pair defeated their North Korean opponents 4–1 in the final, marked South Korea’s first Asian Games gold in table tennis since 2002 - Lee Chul-seung and Ryu Seung-min’s gold in the men’s doubles and Lee Eun-sil and Seok Eun-mi’s gold in the women’s doubles were the country’s last Asiad golds in the sport. .

=== 2024 ===
On July 2, 2024, Shin Yubin entered the world top 10 for the first time, reaching No. 9. Shin Yu-bin competed in the Paris Olympics, reaching the bronze medal match in all three events she participated in. Shin first won a bronze medal in the mixed doubles event with Lim Jong-hoon, then lost to Hina Hayata in the women's singles. Finally, in the women's team event, she teamed up with Jeon Ji-hee and Lee Eun-hye to defeat the German team and secure her second bronze medal.

=== 2025 ===
At the World Table Tennis Championships 2025, Shin with Lim Jonghoon and Ryu Han-na, won bronze medals in the mixed doubles and women’s doubles events, becoming the first Korean female player in 32 years—since Hyun Jung-hwa — to win multiple medals at a single WTTC.

At the end of the year, Shin Yubin and Lim Jonghoon defeated the world No. 1 mixed doubles pairs Lin Shidong/Kuai Man in the semifinals and Wang Chuqin/Sun Yingsha in the final at the WTT Finals Hong Kong, becoming the first Korean mixed doubles pair to achieve this feat.

In 2025, Shin Yubin also made remarkable progress in women’s singles, becoming the first Korean female player to reach the semifinals of a Grand Smash event at China Smash 2025. She was also the first Korean female player to reach the semifinals twice consecutively at the Montpellier and Frankfurt events in the WTT Champions series.

=== 2026 ===
According to the world rankings in week 7 of 2026, Lim Jonghoon and Shin Yubin officially became the world No. 1 mixed doubles pair.

In April 2026, at the ITTF World Cup Macao 2026, Shin Yubin became the first Korean female player in history to win a medal at the World Cup.

== Finals ==
=== Singles ===
Year	Tournament	Final opponent	Score	Result	Ref
2021	Asian Championships	(Japan) Hina Hayata	1–3	Runner-up	
2022	WTT Contender Nova Gorica	(Monaco) Xiaoxin Yang	4–3	Winner	
2023	WTT Contender Lagos	(China) Li Yake	4–2	Winner	
2023	WTT Contender Tunis	(Japan) Miwa Harimoto	2–4	Runner-up	
2023	WTT Contender Lima	(Romania) Bernadette Szőcs	4–1	Winner	
2024	WTT Contender Doha	(South Korea) Jeon Ji-hee	3–4	Runner-up	

=== Women doubles ===
Year	Tournament	Partner	Final opponents	Score	Result	Ref
2019	ITTF Challenge Polish Open	Lee Eun-hye	(Japan) Honoka Hashimoto / Maki Shiomi	1–3	Runner-up	
2021	WTT Star Contender Doha	Jeon Ji-hee	(Japan) Kasumi Ishikawa / Miu Hirano	3–0	Winner	
2021	Asian Championships	Jeon Ji-hee	(Hong Kong) Doo Hoi Kem / Lee Ho Ching	3–1	Winner	
2022	WTT Contender Almaty	Choi Hyo-joo	(Japan) Hina Hayata / Miu Hirano	0–3	Runner-up	
2023	WTT Contender Doha	Jeon Ji-hee	(China) Zhang Rui / Kuai Man	1–3	Runner-up	
2023	World Championships	Jeon Ji-hee	(China) Chen Meng / Wang Yidi	0–3	Runner-up	
2023	WTT Contender Lagos	Jeon Ji-hee	(China) Fan Siqi / Liu Weishan	3–1	Winner	
2023	WTT Contender Zagreb	Jeon Ji-hee	(China) Qian Tianyi / Liu Weishan	3–2	Winner	
2023	WTT Contender Lima	Jeon Ji-hee	(South Korea) Choi Hyo-joo / Kim Na-yeong	3–2	Winner	
2023	WTT Contender Rio de Janeiro	Jeon Ji-hee	(South Korea) Choi Hyo-joo / Kim Na-yeong	3–1	Winner	
2023	Asian Games	Jeon Ji-hee	(North Korea) Cha Su-yong / Pak Su-gyong	4–1	Winner	
2023	WTT Star Contender Lanzhou	Jeon Ji-hee	(China) Chen Meng / Wang Manyu	0–3	Runner-up	
2024	WTT Contender Doha	Jeon Ji-hee	(Germany) Annett Kaufmann / Sabine Winter	3–0	Winner	
2024	WTT Star Contender Goa	Jeon Ji-hee	(South Korea) Joo Cheon-hui / Choi Hyo-joo	3–1	Winner	
2024	WTT Saudi Smash	Jeon Ji-hee	(China) Chen Meng / Wang Manyu	0–3	Runner-up	
2024	WTT Star Contender Bangkok	Jeon Ji-hee	(Japan) Honoka Hashimoto / Hitomi Sato	1–3	Runner-up	
2025	WTT Star Contender Chennai	Ryu Han-na	(Japan) Miwa Harimoto / Miyuu Kihara	2–3	Runner-up	
2025	WTT Star Contender Ljubljana	Choi Hyo-joo	(Japan) Miwa Harimoto / Satsuki Odo	1–3	Runner-up	
2026	WTT Singapore Smash	Miyu Nagasaki	(Japan) Miwa Harimoto / Hina Hayata	0–3	Runner-up	

=== Mixed doubles ===
Year	Tournament	Partner	Final opponents	Score	Result	Ref
2019	ITTF World Tour Czech Open	Cho Dae-seong	(Japan) Jun Mizutani / Mima Ito	3–2	Winner	
2022	WTT Contender Nova Gorica	Lim Jong-hoon	(India) Sathiyan Gnanasekaran / Manika Batra	3–0	Winner	
2023	WTT Contender Doha	Lim Jong-hoon	(China) Lin Shidong / Kuai Man	0–3	Runner-up	
2023	WTT Star Contender Bangkok	Lim Jong-hoon	(China) Lin Gaoyuan / Chen Xingtong	2–3	Runner-up	
2023	WTT Contender Tunis	Lim Jong-hoon	(Chinese Taipei) Lin Yun-ju / Chen Szu-yu	0–3	Runner-up	
2023	WTT Contender Rio de Janeiro	Lim Jong-hoon	(Spain) Álvaro Robles / María Xiao	3–1	Winner	
2024	WTT Star Contender Goa	Lim Jong-hoon	(Spain) Álvaro Robles / María Xiao	3–0	Winner	
2024	WTT Singapore Smash	Lim Jong-hoon	(China) Wang Chuqin / Sun Yingsha	1–3	Runner-up	
2024	WTT Contender Rio de Janeiro	Lim Jong-hoon	(Japan) Tomokazu Harimoto / Hina Hayata	3–0	Winner	
2024	WTT Contender Zagreb	Lim Jong-hoon	(Japan) Tomokazu Harimoto / Hina Hayata	2–3	Runner-up	
2024	WTT Contender Lagos	Lim Jong-hoon	(China) Luo Jiecheng / Xu Huiyao	3–0	Winner	
2024	WTT Star Contender Ljubljana	Lim Jong-hoon	(Japan) Tomokazu Harimoto / Hina Hayata	2–3	Runner-up	
2025	WTT Star Contender Chennai	Lim Jong-hoon	(Japan) Maharu Yoshimura / Satsuki Odo	3–0	Winner	
2025	WTT Star Contender Ljubljana	Lim Jong-hoon	(Brazil) Hugo Calderano / Bruna Takahashi	3–0	Winner	
2025	WTT Contender Zagreb	Lim Jong-hoon	(China) Huang Youzheng / Chen Yi	3–0	Winner	
2025	WTT United States Smash	Lim Jong-hoon	(China) Lin Shidong / Kuai Man	0–3	Runner-up	
2025	WTT Europe Smash — Sweden	Lim Jong-hoon	(China) Lin Shidong / Kuai Man	0–3	Runner-up	
2025	WTT Finals	Lim Jong-hoon	(China) Wang Chuqin / Sun Yingsha	3–0	Winner	
2026	WTT Singapore Smash	Lim Jong-hoon	(Brazil) Hugo Calderano / Bruna Takahashi	0–3	Runner-up	
2026	WTT Star Contender Ljubljana	Lim Jong-hoon	(Germany) Dang Qiu / Sabine Winter	3–1	Winner	
2026	WTT United States Smash	Lim Jong-hoon	(China) Wang Chuqin / Sun Yingsha	3–2	Winner	
2026	WTT China Smash	Lim Jong-hoon	(Chinese Taipei) Lin Yun-ju / Cheng I-ching	3–2	Winner	
