= Hitomi Sato (table tennis) =

Japanese table tennis player

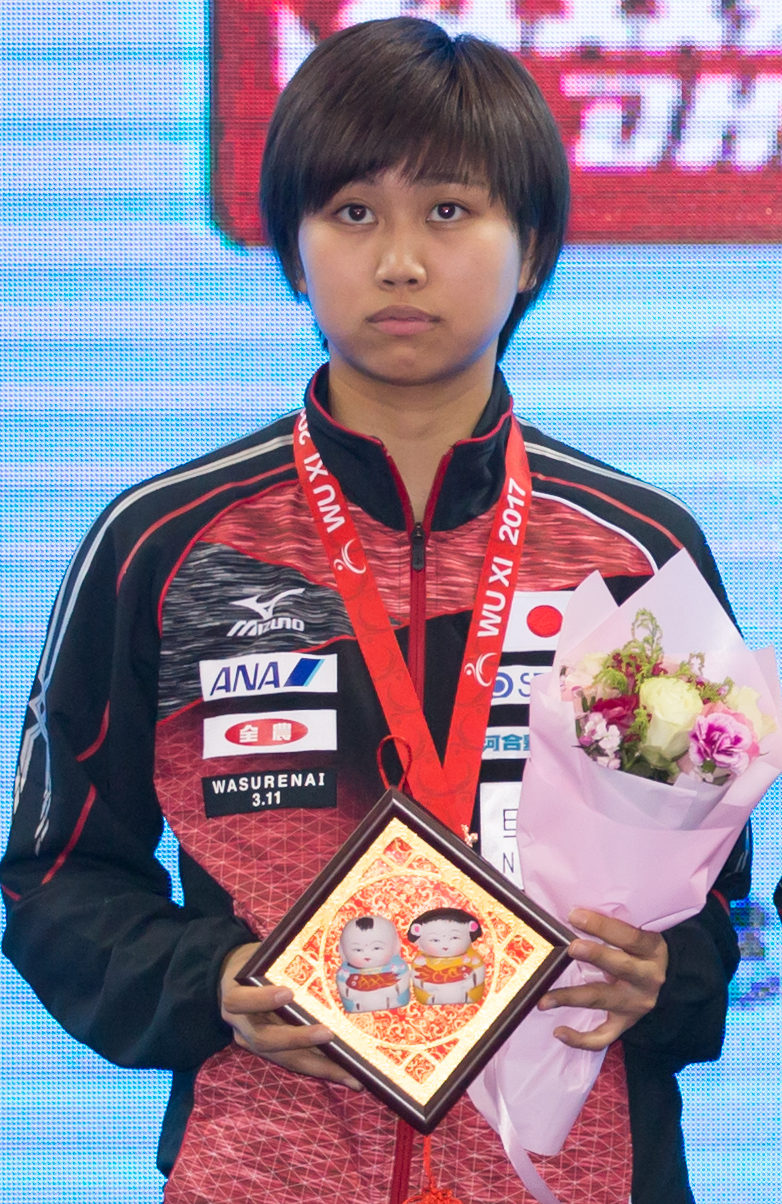
- Sato at the 2017 Asian Championships

Personal information
- Born: 23 December 1997 (age 28) Hakodate, Hokkaido, Japan
- Height: 163 cm (5 ft 4 in)

Sport
- Sport: Table tennis
- Club: Nippon Paint Mallets (T.League)
- Playing style: Right-handed shakehand grip
- Highest ranking: 8 (October 2026)
- Current ranking: 8 (12 October 2026)
Medal record
Women's table tennis
Representing Japan
World Championships
Silver medal – second place	2022 Chengdu	Team
Bronze medal – third place	2019 Budapest	Doubles
World Cup
Silver medal – second place	2019 Tokyo	Team
Asian Championships
Gold medal – first place	2021 Doha	Team
Silver medal – second place	2017 Wuxi	Team
Silver medal – second place	2019 Yogyakarta	Team
Bronze medal – third place	2017 Wuxi	Doubles
Bronze medal – third place	2019 Yogyakarta	Doubles
Bronze medal – third place	2023 Pyeongchang	Team

Hitomi Sato (佐藤 瞳, Satō Hitomi; born 23 December 1997) is a Japanese table tennis player. She won a bronze medal with Honoka Hashimoto at the 2019 World Table Tennis Championships.

== Finals ==
=== Women's singles ===
Result	Year	Tournament	Opponent	Score	Ref
Winner	2016	ITTF World Tour, Croatia Open	(Japan) Miu Hirano	4–1	
Winner	2017	ITTF Challenge, Belarus Open	(Japan) Honoka Hashimoto	4–1	
Winner	2017	ITTF Challenge, Thailand Open	(Japan) Honoka Hashimoto	4–1	
Winner	2017	ITTF Challenge, Slovenian Open	(Hungary) Georgina Póta	4–0	
Runner-up	2018	ITTF Challenge, Spanish Open	(Japan) Saki Shibata	2–4	
Winner	2019	ITTF Challenge, Thailand Open	(Japan) Saki Shibata	4–3	
Winner	2020	ITTF Challenge Plus, Oman Open	(Japan) Miyu Kato	4–2	
Runner-up	2024	WTT Feeder Cappadocia	(Japan) Satsuki Odo	0–3	
Winner	2024	WTT Feeder Doha	(India) Yashaswini Ghorpade	3–1	
Winner	2025	WTT Feeder Otocec II	(South Korea) Choi Hyo-joo	3–2	
Winner	2025	WTT Feeder Havirov	(Japan) Saki Shibata	3–2	
Winner	2025	WTT Feeder Prishtina	(France) Camille Lutz	3–0	
Winner	2025	WTT Feeder Cappadocia II	(Japan) Asuka Sasao	3–1	
Runner-up	2026	WTT Star Contender Doha	(Macau) Zhu Yuling	2–4	
Runner-up	2026	WTT Star Contender; São José dos Campos	(Japan) Hina Hayata	2–4	
Winner	2026	WTT Contender Panagyurishte	(Japan) Sakura Yokoi	4–1	
Runner-up	2026	WTT Star Contender Astana	(Japan) Miyuu Kihara	3–4	
Runner-up	2026	WTT China Smash 2026	(China) Wang Manyu	0-4	

=== Women's doubles ===
Result	Year	Tournament	Partner	Opponent	Score	Ref
Winner	2016	ITTF World Tour, Australian Open	Honoka Hashimoto	(Australia) Jian Fang Lay / Miao Miao	3–1	
Winner	2016	ITTF World Tour, Belarus Open	Honoka Hashimoto	(South Korea) Jung Yu-mi / Park Se-ri	3–1	
Winner	2016	ITTF World Tour, Austrian Open	Honoka Hashimoto	(Japan) Miyu Kato / Hina Hayata	3–2	
Winner	2017	ITTF Challenge, Thailand Open	Honoka Hashimoto	(Hong Kong) Doo Hoi Kem / Mak Tze Wing	3–0	
Winner	2017	ITTF Challenge, Croatia Open	Honoka Hashimoto	(Belarus) Nadezhda Bogdanova / Daria Trigolos	3–0	
Runner-up	2017	ITTF World Tour, Austrian Open	Honoka Hashimoto	(China) Chen Xingtong / Sun Yingsha	2–3	
Winner	2017	ITTF Challenge, Belgium Open	Honoka Hashimoto	(South Korea) Lee Zi-on / Song Ma-eum	3–2	
Winner	2018	ITTF Challenge, Spanish Open	Honoka Hashimoto	(Luxembourg) Sarah De Nutte / Ni Xialian	3–0	
Winner	2018	ITTF Challenge, Croatia Open	Honoka Hashimoto	(Sweden) Matilda Ekholm / (Hungary) Georgina Póta	3–1	
Runner-up	2018	ITTF World Tour, Australian Open	Honoka Hashimoto	(Japan) Hina Hayata / Mima Ito	0–3	
Runner-up	2019	ITTF Challenge Plus, Oman Open	Honoka Hashimoto	(Japan) Saki Shibata / Satsuki Odo	1–3	
Runner-up	2019	ITTF Challenge, Croatia Open	Honoka Hashimoto	(Japan) Miyuu Kihara / Miyu Nagasaki	1–3	
Winner	2019	ITTF Challenge Plus, Canada Open	Honoka Hashimoto	(China) Che Xiaoxi / Li Jiayi	3–0	
Winner	2020	ITTF Challenge Plus, Oman Open	Honoka Hashimoto	(Singapore) Lin Ye / Zeng Jian	3–0	
Winner	2024	WTT Feeder Cappadocia	Honoka Hashimoto	(India) Poymantee Baisya / Krittwika Roy	3–0	
Winner	2024	WTT Contender Rio de Janeiro	Honoka Hashimoto	(Chinese Taipei) Cheng Hsien-tzu / Chien Tung-chuan	3–0	
Winner	2024	WTT Star Contender Bangkok	Honoka Hashimoto	(South Korea) Shin Yu-bin / Jeon Ji-hee	3–1	
Winner	2024	WTT Feeder Olomouc	Honoka Hashimoto	(China) Yang Yiyun / Zhu Sibing	3–0	
Winner	2024	WTT Feeder Panagyurishte	Honoka Hashimoto	(Japan) Satsuki Odo / Sakura Yokoi	3–0	
Runner-up	2024	WTT Feeder Doha	Honoka Hashimoto	(Japan) Yuna Ojio / Anne Uesawa	1–3	
Winner	2024	WTT Finals	Honoka Hashimoto	(Japan) Satsuki Odo / Sakura Yokoi	3–0	
Winner	2025	WTT Feeder Otocec	Saki Shibata	(Malaysia) Tee Ai Xin / Lyne Karen	3–2	
Winner	2025	WTT Feeder Havirov	Saki Shibata	(South Korea) Choi Hyo-joo / Lee Da-eun	3–1	
Winner	2025	WTT Feeder Prishtina	Sakura Yokoi	(Japan) Kaho Akae / Misuzu Takeya	3–2	
Runner-up	2025	WTT Contender Zagreb	Sakura Yokoi	(Japan) Miwa Harimoto / Satsuki Odo	2–3	
Runner-up	2025	WTT Feeder Spokane	Saki Shibata	(Japan) Asuka Sasao / Anne Uesawa	2–3	
Winner	2025	WTT Feeder Spokane II	Saki Shibata	(Japan) Asuka Sasao / Anne Uesawa	3–1	
Winner	2025	WTT Contender Almaty	Honoka Hashimoto	(China) Shi Xunyao / Qian Tianyi	3–0	
Winner	2025	WTT Feeder Cappadocia II	Saki Shibata	(Singapore) Ser Lin Qian / Loy Ming Ying	3–0	
Runner-up	2026	WTT Star Contender Doha	Saki Shibata	(Japan) Sakura Yokoi / Satsuki Odo	0–3	
Runner-up	2026	WTT Contender Lagos	Saki Shibata	(Japan) Reina Aso / (South Korea) Joo Cheon-hui	1–3	

=== Mixed doubles ===
Result	Year	Tournament	Partner	Opponents	Score	Ref
Winner	2025	WTT Feeder Spokane	Satoshi Aida	(Japan) Keishi Hagihara/ Kaho Akae	3–0	
Winner	2025	WTT Star Contender Muscat	Satoshi Aida	(Chinese Taipei) Lin Yun-ju / Cheng I-ching	3–0	
