= Zhang Rui =

Zhang Rui is the name of:

- Zhang Rui (table tennis, born 1979) (张瑞; Zhāng Ruì), Chinese table tennis player who represented Hong Kong
- Zhang Rui (table tennis, born 1997) (张瑞; Zhāng Ruì), Chinese table tennis player
- Zhang Rui (footballer) (张睿; Zhāng Ruì, born 1989), Chinese association footballer
