= Table tennis at the 2019 Summer Universiade =

Table tennis at the XXX Summer Universiade
- Venue: PalaTrincone
- Dates: 4–11 July

Table tennis was contested at the 2019 Summer Universiade from 4 to 11 July 2019 at the PalaTrincone in Naples.

== Medal summary ==
=== Medal table ===
Rank	Nation	Gold	Silver	Bronze	Total
1	China (CHN)	7	5	3	15
2	Japan (JPN)	0	1	4	5
3	Chinese Taipei (TPE)	0	1	1	2
4	Russia (RUS)	0	0	4	4
5	France (FRA)	0	0	1	1
5	Germany (GER)	0	0	1	1
Totals (6 entries)		7	7	14	28

=== Events ===
Event	Gold	Silver	Bronze
Men's singles	Yu Ziyang; China	Zhao Zihao; China	Sadi Ismailov; Russia
Men's singles	Yu Ziyang; China	Zhao Zihao; China	Zhu Linfeng; China
Women's singles	Wang Yidi; China	Zhang Rui; China	Fan Siqi; China
Women's singles	Wang Yidi; China	Zhang Rui; China	Guo Yan; China
Men's doubles	China (CHN); Zhao Zihao; Yu Ziyang	China (CHN); Zhu Linfeng; Kong Lingxuan	Japan (JPN); Yusuke Sadamatsu; Yuma Tsuboi
Men's doubles	China (CHN); Zhao Zihao; Yu Ziyang	China (CHN); Zhu Linfeng; Kong Lingxuan	Japan (JPN); Fumiya Igarashi; Asuka Sakai
Women's doubles	China (CHN); Wang Yidi; Fan Siqi	China (CHN); Zhang Rui; Guo Yan	Russia (RUS); Yana Noskova; Valeriia Scherbatykh
Women's doubles	China (CHN); Wang Yidi; Fan Siqi	China (CHN); Zhang Rui; Guo Yan	Japan (JPN); Asuka Sasao; Minami Ando
Mixed doubles	China (CHN); Wang Yidi; Yu Ziyang	China (CHN); Fan Siqi; Zhao Zihao	Russia (RUS); Yana Noskova; Sadi Ismailov
Mixed doubles	China (CHN); Wang Yidi; Yu Ziyang	China (CHN); Fan Siqi; Zhao Zihao	Chinese Taipei (TPE); Su Pei-ling; Liao Cheng-ting
Men's team	China (CHN); Yu Ziyang; Zhao Zihao; Kong Lingxuan; Zhu Linfeng	Chinese Taipei (TPE); Liao Cheng-ting; Peng Wang-wei; Wang Tai-wei; Yang Heng-wei	Germany (GER); Florian Bluhm; Nils Hohmeier; Qui Liang; Gianluca Walther
Men's team	China (CHN); Yu Ziyang; Zhao Zihao; Kong Lingxuan; Zhu Linfeng	Chinese Taipei (TPE); Liao Cheng-ting; Peng Wang-wei; Wang Tai-wei; Yang Heng-wei	Japan (JPN); Yusuke Sadamatsu; Yuma Tsuboi; Fumiya Igarashi; Asuka Sakai
Women's team	China (CHN); Wang Yidi; Fan Siqi; Zhang Rui; Guo Yan	Japan (JPN); Minami Ando; Hatsune Maetaki; Asuka Sasao; Saki Seyama	Russia (RUS); Yana Noskova; Valeriia Scherbatykh; Ekaterina Cherniavskaia; Mariia Malanina
Women's team	China (CHN); Wang Yidi; Fan Siqi; Zhang Rui; Guo Yan	Japan (JPN); Minami Ando; Hatsune Maetaki; Asuka Sasao; Saki Seyama	France (FRA); Pauline Chasselin; Océane Guisnel; Marie Migot; Laura Pfefer
