= Table tennis at the 2017 Summer Universiade =

Table tennis at the XXIX Summer Universiade
- Venue: New Taipei City Xinzhuang Gymnasium 1F
- Dates: 22–29 August 2017

Table tennis was contested at the 2017 Summer Universiade from August 22 to 29 at the New Taipei City Xinzhuang Gymnasium 1F in New Taipei City, Taiwan. Men's and women's singles, men's and women's team, and men's, women's, and mixed doubles events were contested.

== Medal summary ==
=== Medal table ===
Rank	Nation	Gold	Silver	Bronze	Total
1	Japan (JPN)	3	3	1	7
2	South Korea (KOR)	3	1	2	6
3	China (CHN)	1	0	1	2
4	Chinese Taipei (TPE)*	0	2	5	7
5	North Korea (PRK)	0	1	3	4
6	France (FRA)	0	0	1	1
6	Romania (ROU)	0	0	1	1
Totals (7 entries)		7	7	14	28

=== Events ===
Event	Gold	Silver	Bronze
Men's singles	Masataka Morizono; Japan	Chen Chien-an; Chinese Taipei	Pak Sin-hyok; North Korea
Men's singles	Masataka Morizono; Japan	Chen Chien-an; Chinese Taipei	Alexandre Robinot; France
Women's singles	Jeon Ji-hee; South Korea	Cheng I-ching; Chinese Taipei	Kim Song-i; North Korea
Women's singles	Jeon Ji-hee; South Korea	Cheng I-ching; Chinese Taipei	Bernadette Szőcs; Romania
Men's doubles	Japan (JPN); Masataka Morizono; Yuya Oshima	South Korea (KOR); Jang Woo-jin; Lim Jong-hoon	Chinese Taipei (TPE); Chen Chien-an; Chiang Hung-chieh
Men's doubles	Japan (JPN); Masataka Morizono; Yuya Oshima	South Korea (KOR); Jang Woo-jin; Lim Jong-hoon	Chinese Taipei (TPE); Lee Chia-sheng; Liao Cheng-ting
Women's doubles	Japan (JPN); Ayami Narumoto; Rei Yamamoto	North Korea (PRK); Cha Hyo-sim; Kim Nam-hae	Japan (JPN); Minami Ando; Rika Suzuki
Women's doubles	Japan (JPN); Ayami Narumoto; Rei Yamamoto	North Korea (PRK); Cha Hyo-sim; Kim Nam-hae	South Korea (KOR); Jeon Ji-hee; Lee Eun-hye
Mixed doubles	South Korea (KOR); Jang Woo-jin; Jeon Ji-hee	Japan (JPN); Kazuhiro Yoshimura; Minami Ando	Chinese Taipei (TPE); Liao Cheng-ting; Chen Szu-yu
Mixed doubles	South Korea (KOR); Jang Woo-jin; Jeon Ji-hee	Japan (JPN); Kazuhiro Yoshimura; Minami Ando	North Korea (PRK); Pak Sin-hyok; Kim Nam-hae
Men's team	China (CHN); Chen Xin; Kong Lingxuan; Lai Jiaxin; Yu Ziyang; Zhu Linfeng	Japan (JPN); Masataka Morizono; Yuya Oshima; Tonin Ryuzaki; Masaki Yoshida; Kazuhiro Yoshimura	Chinese Taipei (TPE); Chen Chien-an; Chiang Hung-chieh; Lee Chia-sheng; Liao Cheng-ting; Sun Chia-hung
Men's team	China (CHN); Chen Xin; Kong Lingxuan; Lai Jiaxin; Yu Ziyang; Zhu Linfeng	Japan (JPN); Masataka Morizono; Yuya Oshima; Tonin Ryuzaki; Masaki Yoshida; Kazuhiro Yoshimura	South Korea (KOR); An Jun-hee; Baek Kyung-jun; Jang Woo-jin; Kim Seok-ho; Lim Jong-hoon
Women's team	South Korea (KOR); An Yeong-un; Jeon Ji-hee; Kim Ga-young; Kim Hyo-mi; Lee Eun-hye	Japan (JPN); Minami Ando; Reiko Ikegami; Ayami Narumoto; Rika Suzuki; Rei Yamamoto	Chinese Taipei (TPE); Chen Szu-yu; Cheng Hsien-tzu; Cheng I-ching; Lin Chia-chih; Liu Yu-hsin
Women's team	South Korea (KOR); An Yeong-un; Jeon Ji-hee; Kim Ga-young; Kim Hyo-mi; Lee Eun-hye	Japan (JPN); Minami Ando; Reiko Ikegami; Ayami Narumoto; Rika Suzuki; Rei Yamamoto	China (CHN); Sun Chen; Wang Shu; Zheng Shichang; Zhou Xintong
