= 2021 Asian Table Tennis Championships – Women's team =

Women's team at the 2021 Asian Table Tennis Championships
- Venue: Lusail Sports Arena
- Date: 28 September 2021 – 1 October 2021
- Competitors: 73 from 18 nations

The women's team at the 2021 Asian Table Tennis Championships in Doha was held at Lusail Sports Arena from 28 September to 1 October 2021.

== System of play ==
Team events will be divided into two divisions, namely the Champion Division and the First Division.

1st Division

Based on the number of entries, all teams excluding the top 6 teams from the last Asian Championships will be divided into groups of 3 or 4 teams. In the first stage, all groups play in a round robin system to determine their positions. In the second stage, group winners play in a progressive knock-out system to determine the top 2 teams (winner and runner-up) that directly enter the Champion Division. Other teams play in a progressive knock-out system to decide their final positions.

Champion Division

Champion Division consists of top 6 teams from the last Asian Championships in 2019 and the top 2 teams from the 1st Division. Play starts directly in a progressive knock-out system to determine the final positions.

Match order in team events are A vs X, B vs Y, C vs Z, A vs Y, B vs X. All matches will be played in best of five (5) games.

== Schedule ==
All times are Arabia Standard Time (UTC+03:00)

Date	Time	Round
Tuesday, 28 September 2021	10:30	Group R1
Tuesday, 28 September 2021	16:30	Group R2
Tuesday, 28 September 2021	19:30	Group R3
Wednesday, 29 September 2021	9:00	First Division semifinals
Wednesday, 29 September 2021	9:00	11–14 semifinals
Wednesday, 29 September 2021	9:00	15–18 semifinals
Wednesday, 29 September 2021	15:00	Champion Division quarterfinals
Wednesday, 29 September 2021	15:00	9–10 final
Wednesday, 29 September 2021	15:00	11–12 final
Wednesday, 29 September 2021	15:00	13–14 final
Wednesday, 29 September 2021	15:00	15–16 final
Wednesday, 29 September 2021	15:00	17–18 final
Wednesday, 29 September 2021	18:30	Champion Division quarterfinals
Thursday, 30 September 2021	9:00; 11:00	Champion Division semifinals
Thursday, 30 September 2021	11:00	5–8 semifinals
Thursday, 30 September 2021	13:00	First Division final
Thursday, 30 September 2021	19:00	Champion Division Final
Friday, 1 October 2021	9:00	5–6 final
Friday, 1 October 2021	9:00	7–8 final

== First division ==
=== Group 1 ===
Pos	Team	Pld	W	L	Pts	Promotion	IND	JOR	NEP
1	India	2	2	0	4	Promote to First Division semifinals	—	3–0	3–0
2	Jordan	2	1	1	3		0–3	—	3–1
3	Nepal	2	0	2	2		0–3	1–3	—

Source: Asian Table Tennis Union

=== Group 2 ===
Pos	Team	Pld	W	L	Pts	Promotion	IRI	INA	MDV
1	Iran	2	2	0	4	Promote to First Division semifinals	—	3–2	3–0
2	Indonesia	2	1	1	3		2–3	—	3–1
3	Maldives	2	0	2	2		0–3	1–3	—

Source: Asian Table Tennis Union

=== Group 3 ===
Pos	Team	Pld	W	L	Pts	Promotion	UZB	MGL	QAT
1	Uzbekistan	2	2	0	4	Promote to First Division semifinals	—	3–0	3–0
2	Mongolia	2	1	1	3		0–3	—	3–0
3	Qatar	2	0	2	2		0–3	0–3	—

Source: Asian Table Tennis Union

=== Group 4 ===
Pos	Team	Pld	W	L	Pts	Promotion	KAZ	SRI	BAN
1	Kazakhstan	2	2	0	4	Promote to First Division semifinals	—	3–0	3–0
2	Sri Lanka	2	1	1	3		0–3	—	3–0
3	Bangladesh	2	0	2	2		0–3	0–3	—

Source: Asian Table Tennis Union

=== Main bracket ===
First Division Semifinals
11	India	3
31	Uzbekistan	0
41	Kazakhstan	3
21	Iran	1

First Division Final
11	India
41	Kazakhstan
9th place
31	Uzbekistan	1
21	Iran	3

=== 11th place bracket ===
11th-14th place
12	Jordan	0
42	Sri Lanka	3
22	Indonesia	3
32	Mongolia	0

11th place
42	Sri Lanka	0
22	Indonesia	3
13th place
12	Jordan	0
32	Mongolia	3

=== 15th place bracket ===
15th-18th place
43	Bangladesh	3
13	Nepal	0
33	Qatar	1
23	Maldives	3

15th place
43	Bangladesh	0
23	Maldives	3
17th place
13	Nepal	1
33	Qatar	3

== Champion division ==
=== Main bracket ===
Quarterfinals
Japan	3
India	1
Hong Kong	3
Chinese Taipei	1
Thailand	0
South Korea	3
Kazakhstan	1
Singapore	3

Semifinals
Japan	3
Hong Kong	0
South Korea	3
Singapore	0

Finals
Japan	3
South Korea	0

=== 5th place bracket ===
5th-8th place
India	3
Chinese Taipei	1
Thailand	3
Kazakhstan	2

5th place
India	3
Thailand	1
7th place
Chinese Taipei	3
Kazakhstan	0

== Final standings ==
Rank	Team
1st place, gold medalist(s)	Japan
2nd place, silver medalist(s)	South Korea
3rd place, bronze medalist(s)	Hong Kong
3rd place, bronze medalist(s)	Singapore
5	India
6	Thailand
7	Chinese Taipei
8	Kazakhstan
9	Iran
10	Uzbekistan
11	Indonesia
12	Sri Lanka
13	Mongolia
14	Jordan
15	Maldives
16	Bangladesh
17	Qatar
18	Nepal
