= Lee Zi-on =

South Korean table tennis player

Personal information
- Born: 27 May 1996 (age 30)
- Height: 165 cm (5 ft 5 in)

Sport
- Sport: Table tennis
- Playing style: Right-handed shakehand
- Highest ranking: 44 (11 July 2023)
- Current ranking: 47 (20 February 2024)
Medal record
Women's table tennis
Representing South Korea
World Cup
Silver medal – second place	2023 Chengdu	Mixed team
Asian Championships
Silver medal – second place	2021 Doha	Team
Bronze medal – third place	2015 Pattaya	Team
Bronze medal – third place	2017 Wuxi	Team
Bronze medal – third place	2026 Tashkent	Team

- Lee Zi-on
- Hangul: 이시온
- RR: I Sion
- MR: I Sion

Lee Zi-on (born 27 May 1996) is a South Korean table tennis player.

== Professional career ==
She is a three-time medalist at the Asian Table Tennis Championships as a member of South Korean women's team.
