= Zhao Zihao =

Chinese table tennis player

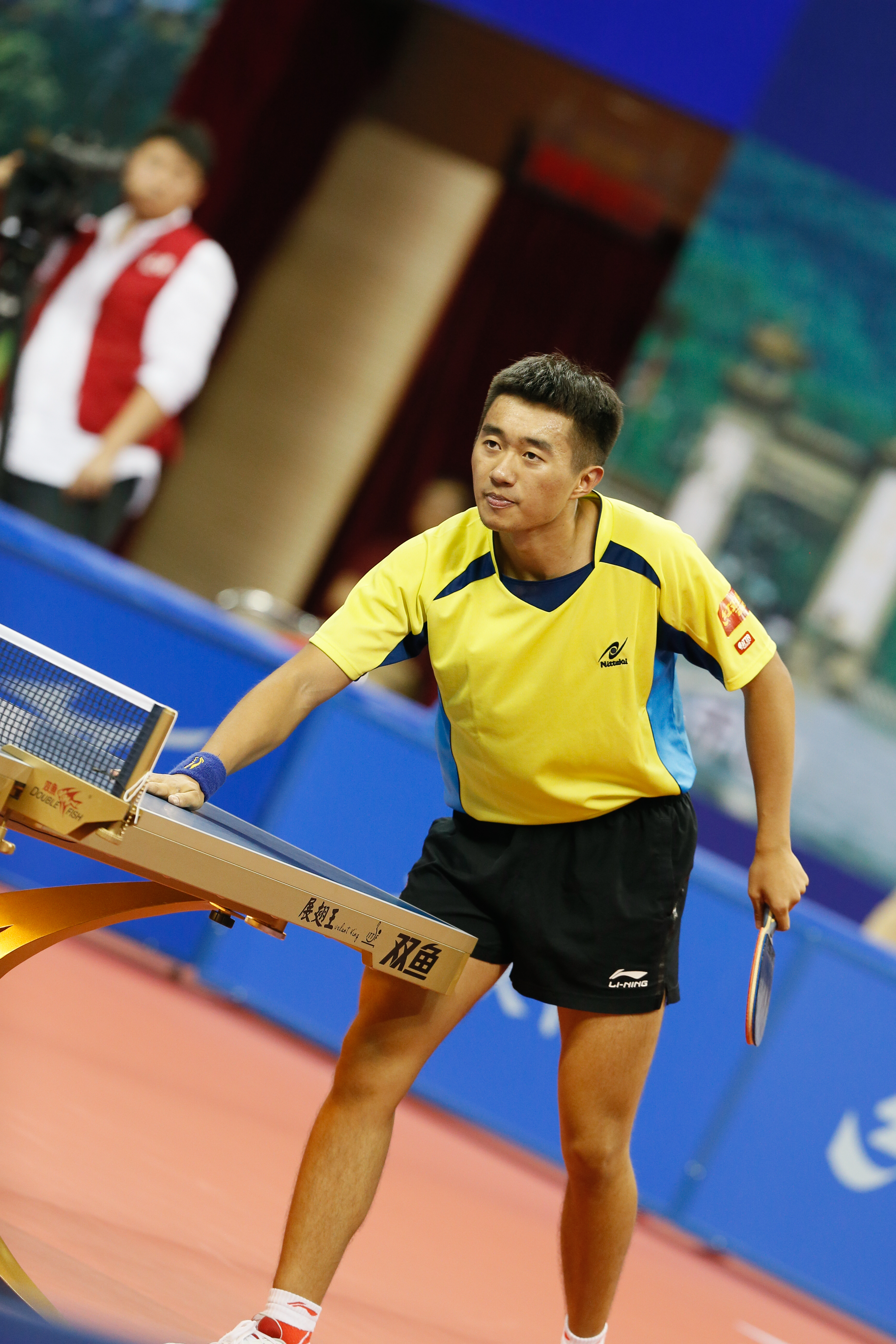
- Zhao at the 2016 All China Table Tennis Championships

Personal information
- Born: 6 January 1997 (age 29) Nanjing, Jiangsu, China

Sport
- Sport: Table tennis
- Playing style: Right-handed penhold
- Highest ranking: 24 (January 2020)
- Current ranking: 24
Medal record
Representing China
Universiade
Gold medal – first place	2019 Naples	Men's doubles
Gold medal – first place	2019 Naples	Men's team
Silver medal – second place	2019 Naples	Men's singles
Silver medal – second place	2019 Naples	Mixed doubles

Zhao Zihao
- Traditional Chinese: 趙子豪
- Simplified Chinese: 赵子豪
Transcriptions
Standard Mandarin
- Hanyu Pinyin: Zhào Zǐháo

Zhao Zihao (Chinese: 赵子豪, born 1 June 1997) is a Chinese table tennis player. He is one of the top penhold players in the world today.

He reached his first ITTF World Tour final at the 2019 Austrian Open. He also won the 2018 Belarus Open. At the 2019 Summer Universiade he bagged two gold and two silver medals.
