= Zhang Rui (table tennis, born 1997) =

Chinese table tennis player

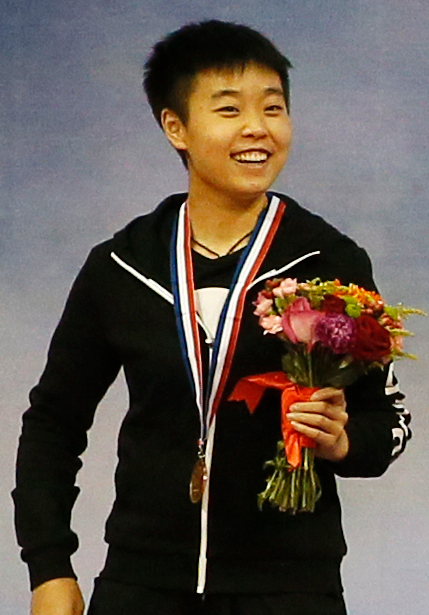
- Zhang at the 2016 All China Table Tennis Championships

Personal information
- Born: 23 January 1997 (age 29) Wuhan, Hubei, China

Sport
- Sport: Table tennis
- Playing style: Right-handed shakehand grip
- Highest ranking: 8 (4 April 2023)
- Current ranking: 8 (11 April 2023)
Medal record
Women's table tennis
Representing China
Universiade
Gold medal – first place	2019 Naples	Team
Silver medal – second place	2019 Naples	Singles
Silver medal – second place	2019 Naples	Doubles

Zhang Rui
- Traditional Chinese: 張瑞
- Simplified Chinese: 张瑞
Transcriptions
Standard Mandarin
- Hanyu Pinyin: Zhāng Ruì

Zhang Rui (Chinese: 张瑞, born 23 January 1997) is a Chinese table tennis player. She won three medals at the 2019 Summer Universiade. She attended Hubei University of Technology.

== ITTF and WTT finals ==
=== Singles ===
Year	Tournament	Final opponent	Score	Rank	Ref
2022	WTT Contender Doha	(China) Fan Siqi	3–4	2nd place, silver medalist(s)	
2022	WTT Contender Tunis	(Japan) Miwa Harimoto	4–3	1st place, gold medalist(s)	
2023	WTT Contender Doha	(China) Fan Siqi	3–4	2nd place, silver medalist(s)	

=== Women's doubles ===
Year	Tournament	Partner	Final opponents	Score	Rank	Ref
2018	ITTF World Tour, Bulgarian Open	Liu Gaoyang	(Japan) Mima Ito; Kasumi Ishikawa	1–3	2nd place, silver medalist(s)	
2018	ITTF World Tour, Czech Open	Liu Gaoyang	(Croatia) Sun Jiayi (Singapore) Zeng Jian	3–0	1st place, gold medalist(s)	
2018	ITTF World Tour, Swedish Open	Liu Gaoyang	(China) Sun Yingsha; Chen Xingtong	1–3	2nd place, silver medalist(s)	
2022	WTT Contender Muscat	Kuai Man	(India) Sutirtha Mukherjee; Ayhika Mukherjee	3–1	1st place, gold medalist(s)	
2022	WTT Feeder Doha	Qian Tianyi	(China) Qi Fei; Liu Weishan	1–3	2nd place, silver medalist(s)	
2022	WTT Contender Tunis	Kuai Man	(China) He Zhuojia; Shi Xunyao	3–1	1st place, gold medalist(s)	
2023	WTT Contender Durban	Kuai Man	(China) Qian Tianyi; Shi Xunyao	3–1	1st place, gold medalist(s)	
2023	WTT Contender Doha	Kuai Man	(South Korea) Shin Yu-bin; Jeon Ji-hee	3–1	1st place, gold medalist(s)	
2023	WTT Feeder Doha	Kuai Man	(China) Qian Tianyi; Shi Xunyao	1–3	2nd place, silver medalist(s)	
