= 2021 Asian Table Tennis Championships =

- Date: 28 September–5 October 2021
- Edition: 25th
- Location: Doha, Qatar
- Asian Table Tennis Championships

The 2021 Asian Table Tennis Championships was a table tennis tournament held in Doha, Qatar, from 28 September to 5 October.

China did not compete at the event due to a focus on the 2021 National Games of China and the 2021 World Table Tennis Championships as well as travel and quarantine restrictions as a result of the COVID-19 pandemic.

== Medal summary ==
=== Events ===
Event	Gold	Silver	Bronze
Men's singles	(South Korea) Lee Sang-su	(Chinese Taipei) Chuang Chih-yuan	(South Korea) Jang Woo-jin
Men's singles	(South Korea) Lee Sang-su	(Chinese Taipei) Chuang Chih-yuan	(Japan) Shunsuke Togami
Women's singles	(Japan) Hina Hayata	(South Korea) Shin Yu-bin	(Japan) Minami Ando
Women's singles	(Japan) Hina Hayata	(South Korea) Shin Yu-bin	(Japan) Saki Shibata
Men's doubles	(Japan) Yukiya Uda (Japan) Shunsuke Togami	(South Korea) Jang Woo-jin (South Korea) Lim Jong-hoon	(India) Harmeet Desai (India) Manav Thakkar
Men's doubles	(Japan) Yukiya Uda (Japan) Shunsuke Togami	(South Korea) Jang Woo-jin (South Korea) Lim Jong-hoon	(India) Sharath Kamal (India) Sathiyan Gnanasekaran
Women's doubles	(South Korea) Jeon Ji-hee (South Korea) Shin Yu-bin	(Hong Kong) Doo Hoi Kem (Hong Kong) Lee Ho Ching	(Japan) Miyu Nagasaki (Japan) Minami Ando
Women's doubles	(South Korea) Jeon Ji-hee (South Korea) Shin Yu-bin	(Hong Kong) Doo Hoi Kem (Hong Kong) Lee Ho Ching	(Chinese Taipei) Cheng Hsien-Tzu (Chinese Taipei) Liu Hsing-Yin
Mixed doubles	(Japan) Shunsuke Togami (Japan) Hina Hayata	(South Korea) Jang Woo-jin (South Korea) Jeon Ji-hee	(Hong Kong) Wong Chun Ting (Hong Kong) Doo Hoi Kem
Mixed doubles	(Japan) Shunsuke Togami (Japan) Hina Hayata	(South Korea) Jang Woo-jin (South Korea) Jeon Ji-hee	(Hong Kong) Ho Kwan Kit (Hong Kong) Lee Ho Ching
Men's team	South Korea; Jang Woo-jin; An Jae-hyun; Lim Jong-hoon; Cho Seung-min; Lee Sang-su	Chinese Taipei; Chen Chien-an; Chuang Chih-yuan; Feng Yi-hsin; Huang Yan-cheng; Sun Chia-hung	India; Sanil Shetty; Harmeet Desai; Manav Thakkar; Sathiyan Gnanasekaran; Sharath Kamal
Men's team	South Korea; Jang Woo-jin; An Jae-hyun; Lim Jong-hoon; Cho Seung-min; Lee Sang-su	Chinese Taipei; Chen Chien-an; Chuang Chih-yuan; Feng Yi-hsin; Huang Yan-cheng; Sun Chia-hung	Japan; Yuto Kizukuri; Hiroto Shinozuka; Shunsuke Togami; Kazuhiro Yoshimura; Yuto Muramatsu
Women's team	Japan; Hina Hayata; Hitomi Sato; Saki Shibata; Miyu Nagasaki; Minami Ando	South Korea; Choi Hyo-joo; Suh Hyo-won; Jeon Ji-hee; Shin Yu-bin; Lee Zi-on	Hong Kong; Ng Wing Nam; Lee Ho Ching; Zhu Cheng Zhu; Lam Yee Lok; Doo Hoi Kem
Women's team	Japan; Hina Hayata; Hitomi Sato; Saki Shibata; Miyu Nagasaki; Minami Ando	South Korea; Choi Hyo-joo; Suh Hyo-won; Jeon Ji-hee; Shin Yu-bin; Lee Zi-on	Singapore; Wong Xinru; Goi Rui Xuan; Zhang Wanling; Zhou Jingyi; Lin Ye

=== Medal table ===
Rank	Nation	Gold	Silver	Bronze	Total
1	Japan	4	0	5	9
2	South Korea	3	4	1	8
3	Chinese Taipei	0	2	1	3
4	Hong Kong	0	1	3	4
5	India	0	0	3	3
6	Singapore	0	0	1	1
Totals (6 entries)		7	7	14	28
