= Cha Hyo-sim =

North Korean table tennis player (born 1994)

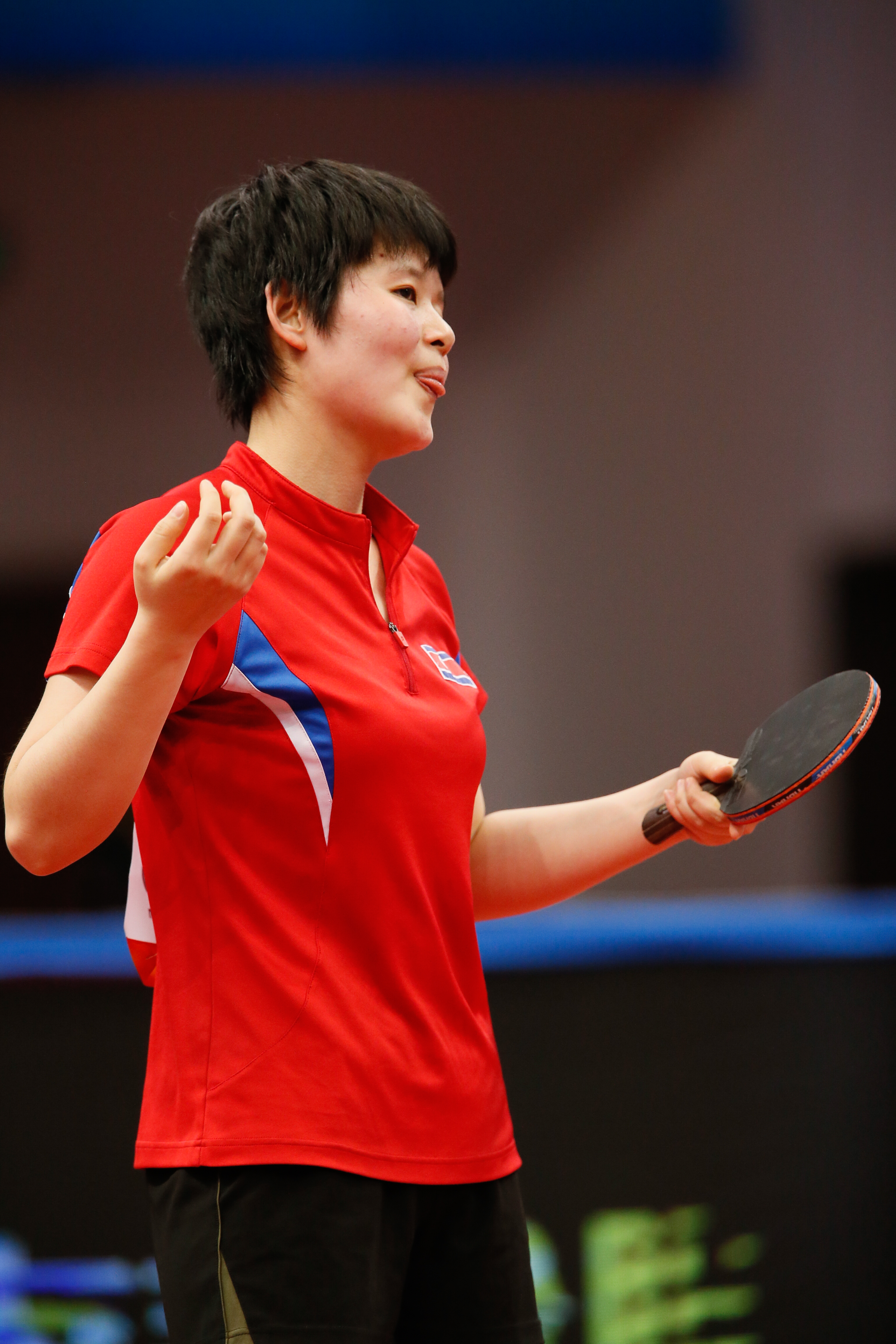
- Cha in 2017

Personal information
- Born: 15 July 1994 (age 32) North Korea
- Height: 165 cm (5 ft 5 in)
- Weight: 60 kg (132 lb)

Sport
- Sport: Table tennis
- Playing style: Left-handed shakehand grip
- Highest ranking: 44 (June 2019)
- Current ranking: 68 (January 2020)
Medal record
Representing North Korea
World Championships
Bronze medal – third place	2016 Selangor	Team
Bronze medal – third place	2018 Halmstad	Team
Asian Games
Silver medal – second place	2018 Jakarta	Team
Universiade
Silver medal – second place	2017 Taipei	Women's doubles

Cha Hyo-sim (Korean: 차효심; Hanja: 車孝心, born 15 July 1994) is a North Korean table tennis player.

In July 2018, she and South Korea's Jang Woo-jin made history when they won the mixed doubles title at the 2018 Korea Open, beating China's Sun Yingsha and Wang Chuqin 3–1 in the final before a huge crowd. It was their first tournament as partners, and the first international event won by an inter-Korean pair.
