= Minami Ando =

Japanese table tennis player

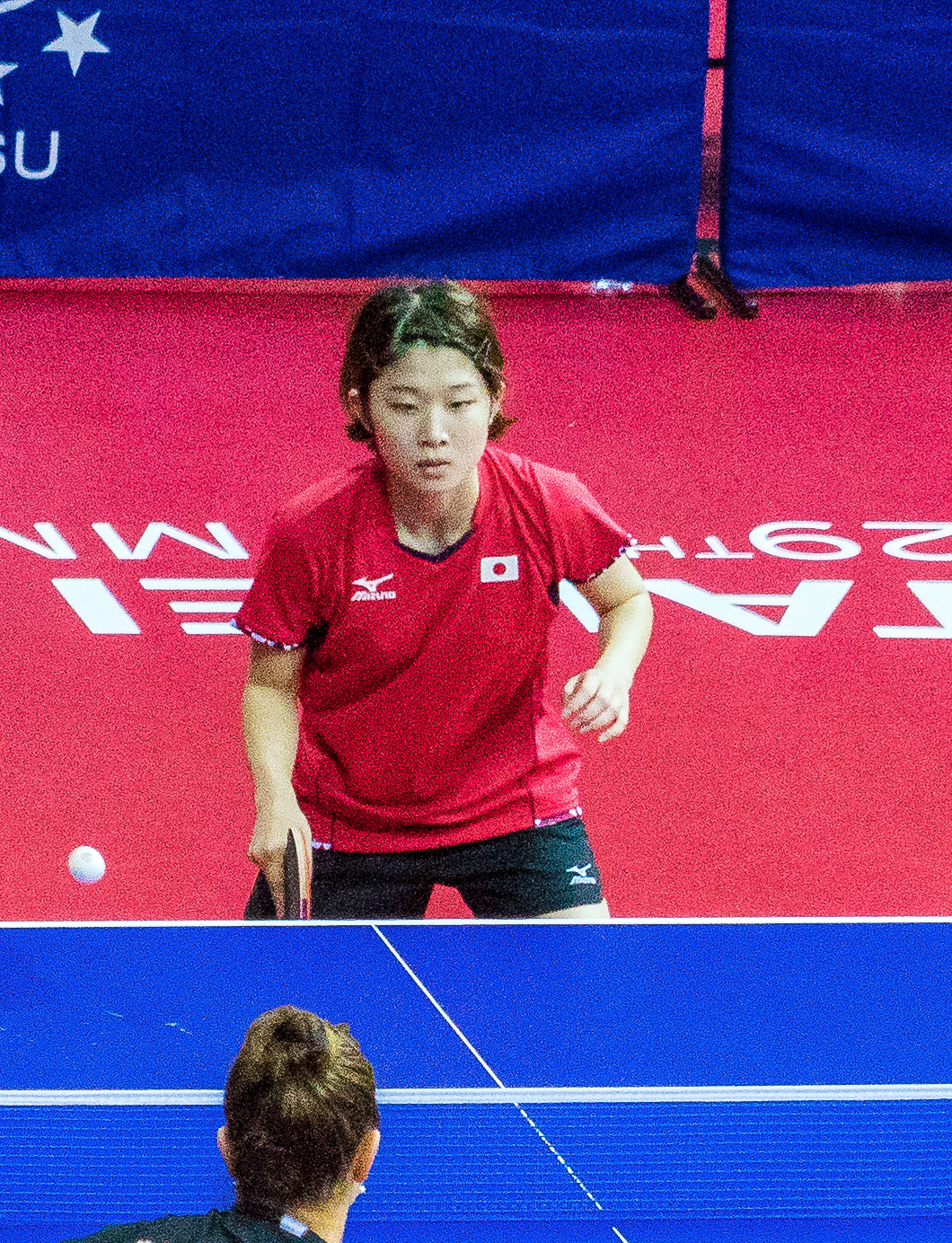
- Ando at the 2017 Summer Universiade

Personal information
- Born: 12 February 1997 (age 29) Aichi Prefecture, Japan
- Height: 149 cm (4 ft 11 in)
- Weight: 45 kg (99 lb)

Sport
- Sport: Table tennis
- Playing style: Right-handed shakehand grip
- Highest ranking: 29 (May 2019)
- Current ranking: 60 (17 May 2022)
Medal record
Women's table tennis
Representing Japan
Asian Championships
Gold medal – first place	2021 Doha	Team
Bronze medal – third place	2021 Doha	Singles
Bronze medal – third place	2021 Doha	Doubles
Universiade
Silver medal – second place	2017 Taipei	Mixed doubles
Silver medal – second place	2017 Taipei	Team
Silver medal – second place	2019 Naples	Team
Bronze medal – third place	2017 Taipei	Doubles
Bronze medal – third place	2019 Naples	Doubles

Minami Ando (安藤 みなみ, Andō Minami; born 12 February 1997) is a Japanese table tennis player.

She was the winner of the 2016 Finlandia Open. She has also won several medals from both the 2017 Summer Universiade and the 2019 Summer Universiade.
