= Jeon Ji-hee =

Chinese-South Korean table tennis player

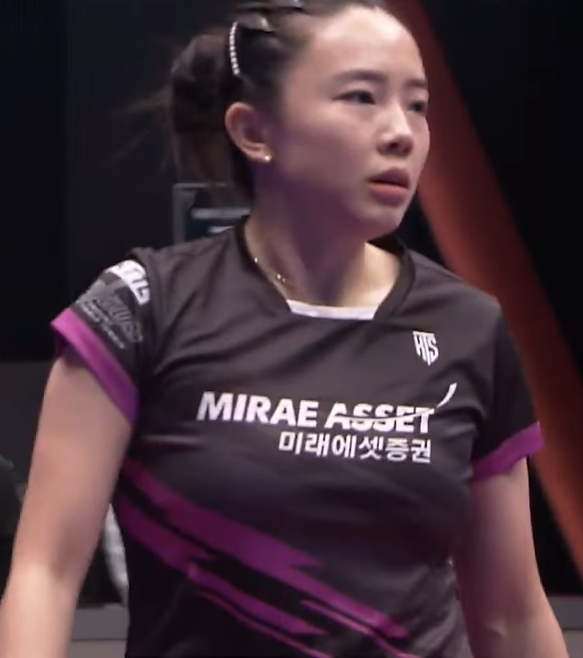
- Jeon in 2023

Personal information
- Nationality: South Korean (since 2011)
- Born: 28 October 1992 (age 34) Langfang, Hebei, China
- Height: 159 cm (5 ft 3 in)

Sport
- Sport: Table tennis
- Playing style: Left-handed, shakehand grip
- Highest ranking: 10 (1 February 2022)
Medal record
Women's table tennis
Representing South Korea
Olympic Games
Bronze medal – third place	2024 Paris	Team
World Championships
Silver medal – second place	2023 Durban	Doubles
World Cup
Silver medal – second place	2023 Chengdu	Mixed team
Silver medal – second place	2024 Chengdu	Mixed team
Bronze medal – third place	2019 Tokyo	Team
Asian Games
Gold medal – first place	2022 Hangzhou	Doubles
Bronze medal – third place	2014 Incheon	Mixed doubles
Bronze medal – third place	2018 Jakarta-Palembang	Singles
Bronze medal – third place	2018 Jakarta-Palembang	Team
Bronze medal – third place	2022 Hangzhou	Mixed doubles
Bronze medal – third place	2022 Hangzhou	Team
Asian Championships
Gold medal – first place	2021 Doha	Doubles
Silver medal – second place	2021 Doha	Mixed doubles
Silver medal – second place	2021 Doha	Team
Silver medal – second place	2023 Pyeongchang	Team
Bronze medal – third place	2019 Yogyakarta	Mixed doubles
Bronze medal – third place	2023 Pyeongchang	Doubles
Summer Universiade
Gold medal – first place	2017 Taipei	Singles
Gold medal – first place	2017 Taipei	Mixed doubles
Gold medal – first place	2017 Taipei	Team
Bronze medal – third place	2017 Taipei	Doubles
Representing Korea
World Championships
Bronze medal – third place	2018 Halmstad	Team

Korean name
- Hangul: 전지희
- Hanja: 田志希
- RR: Jeon Jihui
- MR: Chŏn Chihŭi

Jeon Ji-hee (Korean: 전지희; born 28 October 1992), born Tian Minwei (Chinese: 田旻炜), is a Chinese-South Korean retired table tennis player of Manchu ethnicity.

== Career ==
=== 2016 ===
She competed at the 2016 Summer Olympics in the women's singles event, in which she was eliminated in the fourth round by Yu Mengyu, and as part of the South Korean team in the women's team event.

=== 2021 ===
In March, Jeon played in WTT Doha. In the WTT Contender event, she reached the quarter-finals, where she was upset by Miyuu Kihara. In the WTT Star Contender event, she reached the semi-finals where she lost to Mima Ito. It marked her fourth straight loss to Ito, whom she would meet again in the 2020 Summer Olympics in Tokyo.

Jeon represented South Korea in the women's singles event at the 2020 Summer Olympics. Jeon reached the quarter-finals, where she lost 4–0 to Mima Ito.

She got the gold medal in the women's double at Asian Championship with Shin Yu-bin.

=== 2024 ===
She got the bronze medal in the women's team event at the 2024 Summer Olympics.

== Singles titles ==
Year	Tournament	Final opponent	Score	Ref
2011	ITTF Pro Tour Morocco Open	(Japan) Sayaka Hirano	4–3	
2015	ITTF World Tour, Spanish Open	(Japan) Sayaka Hirano	4–1	
2015	ITTF World Tour, Argentina Open	(South Korea) Yang Ha-eun	4–0	
2015	ITTF World Tour, Chile Open	(South Korea) Yoon Sun-ae	4–0	
2024	WTT Contender Doha	(South Korea) Shin Yu-bin	4–3	
