= Cheng Hsien-tzu =

Taiwanese table tennis player

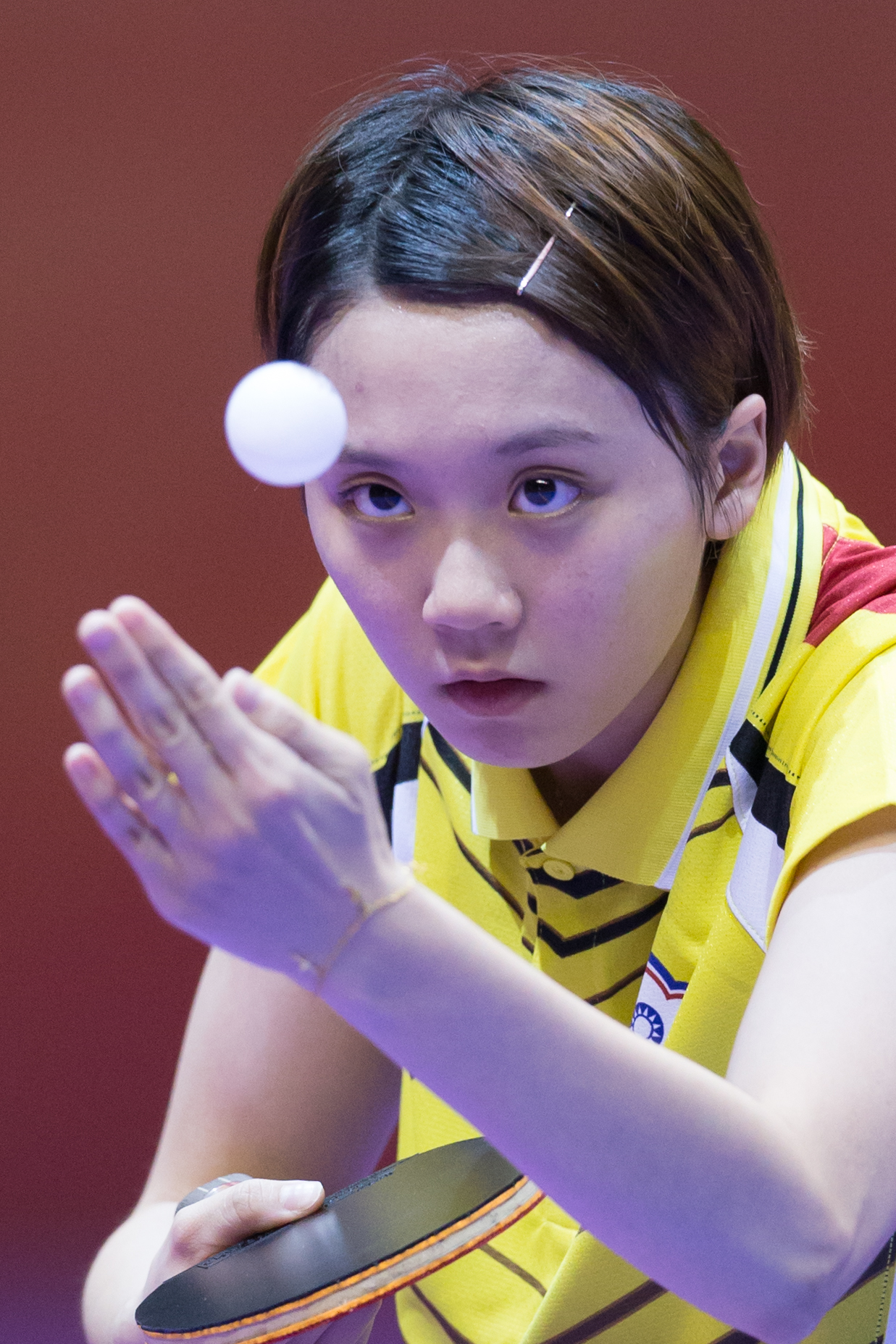
- Cheng in 2016

Personal information
- Born: 18 April 1993 (age 33) Taipei County, Taiwan

Sport
- Sport: Table tennis
- Playing style: Right-handed shakehand grip
- Highest ranking: 43 (April 2018)
- Current ranking: 128 (4 October 2022)
Medal record
Women's table tennis
Representing Chinese Taipei
World Championships
Bronze medal – third place	2016 Selangor	Team
World Cup
Bronze medal – third place	2019 Tokyo	Team
Asian Championships
Bronze medal – third place	2019 Yogyakarta	Team
Bronze medal – third place	2021 Doha	Doubles
Universiade
Silver medal – second place	2015 Gwangju	Team
Bronze medal – third place	2017 Taipei	Team

Cheng Hsien-tzu
- Traditional Chinese: 鄭先知
- Simplified Chinese: 郑先知
Transcriptions
Standard Mandarin
- Hanyu Pinyin: Zhèng Xiānzhī
- Wade–Giles: Cheng^{4} Hsien^{1}-chih^{1}

Cheng Hsien-tzu (Chinese: 鄭先知; born 18 April 1993) is a Taiwanese table tennis player. She attended Chinese Culture University.
