= Suh Hyo-won =

South Korean table tennis player

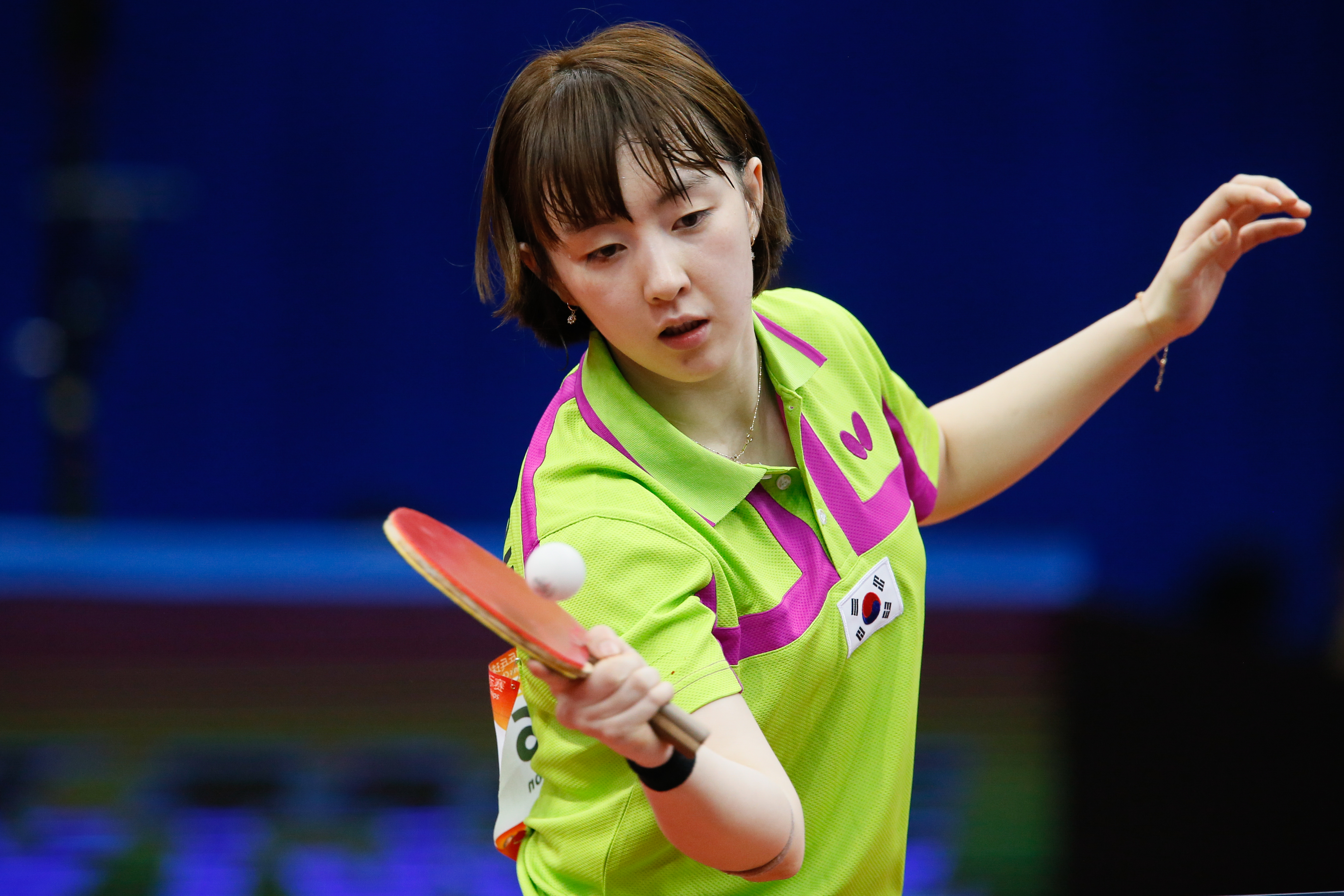
- Suh in 2017

Personal information
- Native name: 서효원
- Born: 10 May 1987 (age 39) Gyeongju, North Gyeongsang Province, South Korea
- Height: 1.58 m (5 ft 2 in)

Sport
- Sport: Table tennis
- Club: KRA Let's run (KTTL)
- Playing style: Right-handed, shakehand grip, defender
- Highest ranking: 8 (April 2014)
- Current ranking: 20 (7 January 2025)
Medal record
Women's table tennis
Representing Korea
World Championships
Bronze medal – third place	2018 Halmstad	Team
Representing South Korea
World Cup
Silver medal – second place	2024 Chengdu	Mixed team
Bronze medal – third place	2019 Tokyo	Team
Asian Games
Bronze medal – third place	2018 Jakarta	Team
Bronze medal – third place	2022 Hangzhou	Team
Asian Championships
Silver medal – second place	2021 Doha	Team
Silver medal – second place	2023 Pyeongchang	Team
Bronze medal – third place	2015 Pattaya	Team
Bronze medal – third place	2017 Wuxi	Team
ITTF World Tour Grand Finals
Silver medal – second place	2014 Bangkok	Singles

Suh Hyo-won or Seo Hyo-won (born May 10, 1987) is a retired South Korean table tennis player. She competed at the 2016 Summer Olympics in the women's singles event, in which she was eliminated in the fourth round by Cheng I-ching, and as part of the South Korean team in the women's team event.

== Singles titles ==
Year	Tournament	Final opponent	Score	Ref
2013	ITTF World Tour, Korea Open	(Japan) Kasumi Ishikawa	4–3	
2013	ITTF World Tour, Polish Open	(China) Sheng Dandan	4–2	
2015	ITTF World Tour, Belgium Open	(Singapore) Feng Tianwei	4–3	
