= Doo Hoi Kem =

Hong Kong table tennis player

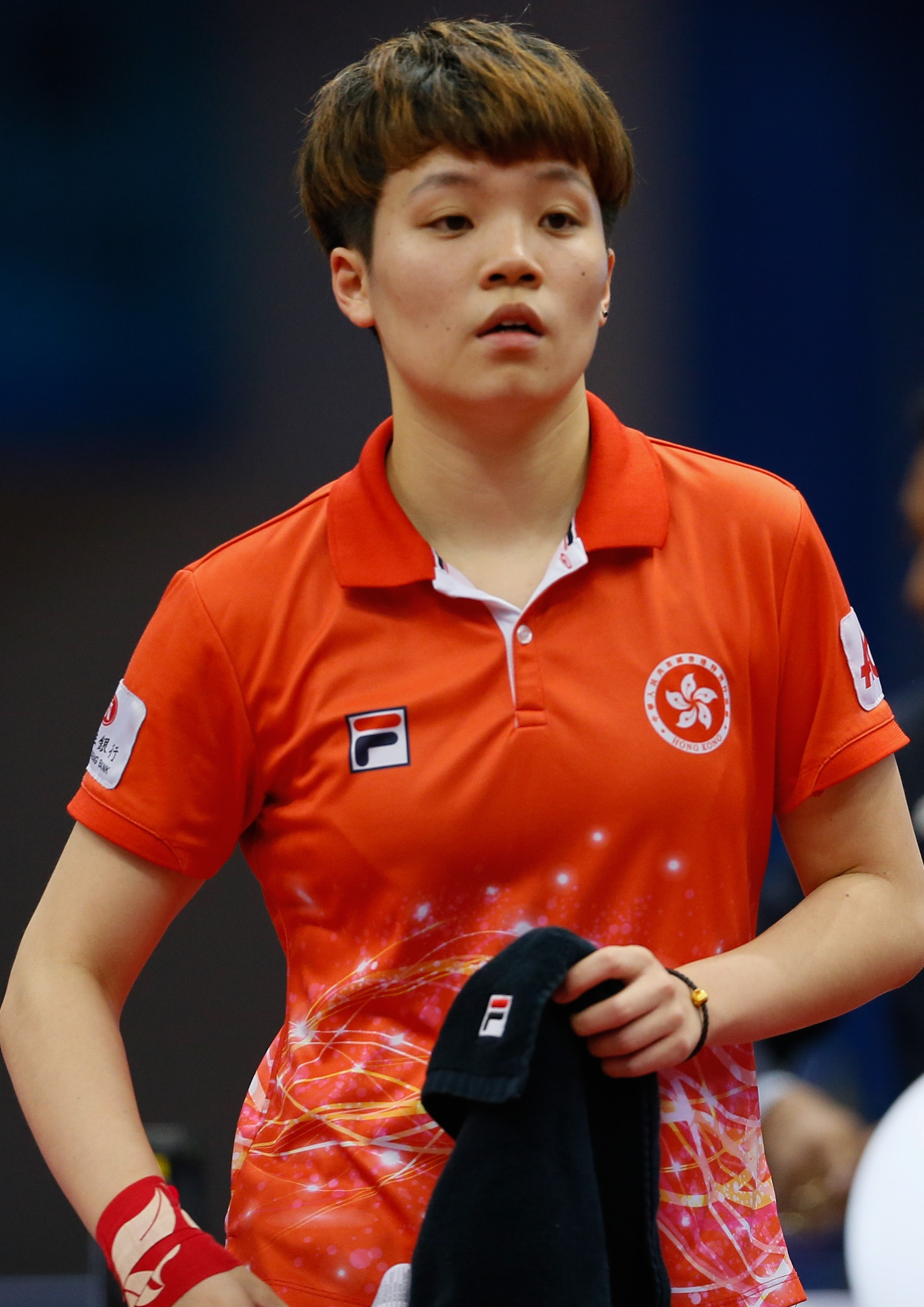
- Doo at the 2017 Asian Championships

Personal information
- Native name: 杜凱琹
- Born: 27 November 1996 (age 29) Hong Kong
- Height: 1.66 m (5 ft 5 in)
- Weight: 59 kg (130 lb)

Sport
- Sport: Table tennis
- Club: Kinoshita Abyell Kanagawa
- Playing style: Right-handed, shakehand grip
- Highest ranking: 7 (26 July 2022)
- Current ranking: 35 (28 September 2026)
Medal record
Women's table tennis
Representing Hong Kong
Olympic Games
Bronze medal – third place	2020 Tokyo	Team
World Championships
Bronze medal – third place	2014 Tokyo	Team
Bronze medal – third place	2015 Suzhou	Mixed doubles
Bronze medal – third place	2017 Düsseldorf	Mixed doubles
Bronze medal – third place	2018 Halmstad	Team
Bronze medal – third place	2023 Durban	Mixed doubles
Bronze medal – third place	2024 Busan	Team
Bronze medal – third place	2025 Doha	Mixed doubles
World Cup
Bronze medal – third place	2024 Chengdu	Mixed team
Asian Games
Bronze medal – third place	2018 Jakarta	Team
Bronze medal – third place	2026 Aichi-Nagoya	Doubles
Asian Championships
Silver medal – second place	2021 Doha	Doubles
Bronze medal – third place	2013 Busan	Doubles
Bronze medal – third place	2015 Pattaya	Team
Bronze medal – third place	2017 Wuxi	Team
Bronze medal – third place	2019 Yogyakarta	Mixed doubles
Bronze medal – third place	2021 Doha	Mixed doubles
Bronze medal – third place	2021 Doha	Team
Bronze medal – third place	2023 Pyeongchang	Team
Bronze medal – third place	2024 Astana	Singles
Bronze medal – third place	2024 Astana	Team
World University Games
Bronze medal – third place	2021 Chengdu	Mixed doubles
Bronze medal – third place	2021 Chengdu	Team

Doo Hoi Kem
- Traditional Chinese: 杜凱琹
- Simplified Chinese: 杜凯琹
Transcriptions
Standard Mandarin
- Hanyu Pinyin: Dù Kǎiqín
Yue: Cantonese
- Jyutping: Dou^{6} Hoi^{2} Kam^{4}

Doo Hoi Kem (Chinese: 杜凱琹; born 27 November 1996) is a Hong Kong table tennis player. She won two medals at the 2014 Summer Youth Olympics and she was a member of Hong Kong women's team at the 2014 World Team Championships. In 2015, she won a bronze medal in mixed doubles event with Wong Chun Ting at the World Championships. In 2021, she also won bronze in the women's team event with Lee Ho Ching and Minnie Soo Wai Yam at the 2020 Summer Olympics.

== Early life ==
Doo studied at Tseung Kwan O Catholic Primary School and Heep Yunn School in her early years. After completing Secondary Three at the age of 15, she chose to become a full-time athlete and entered the Hong Kong Institute of Sports for training. The coaches are the former Chinese table tennis team and the Hong Kong table tennis team. She was the winner of the 2021 President's Certificate of Appreciation (Sports).

== Career ==
At the 2016 Summer Olympics, Doo competed in the team event along with Lee Ho Ching and Tie Ya Na. They lost to Germany in the quarterfinals. In the 2020 Summer Olympics, Doo reached the quarter-finals in the women's singles event where she lost to top seed Chen Meng after leading 2–0. In one of the more interesting wrinkles of the tournament, play was stopped mid-game in Doo's match against Chen so that Doo could cover a logo on her pants with duct tape (due to Olympic sponsorship rules). Doo, along with her teammates Lee Ho Ching and Minnie Soo Wai Yam, won bronze in the women's team event, defeating Germany with 3–1 in the bronze medal match.

== Achievements ==
=== Hong Kong Sports Stars Awards ===
Doo won one of the Hong Kong Junior Sports Stars Awards in 2014. As a member of the Hong Kong National Table Tennis Team (mixed doubles), she was also a two-time winner of the Hong Kong Sports Star Awards for Team Event, both in 2015 and 2017.
