= Choi Hyo-joo =

Chinese-South Korean table tennis player (born 1998)

Personal information
- Nationality: Chinese (before 2013); South Korean (after 2013)
- Born: Yao Yao; 15 April 1998 (age 28) Jiangsu, China
- Height: 155 cm (5 ft 1 in)
- Weight: 50 kg (110 lb)

Sport
- Sport: Table tennis
- Playing style: Left-handed shakehand grip
- Highest ranking: 36 (February 2016)
- Current ranking: 85 (15 July 2025)
Medal record
Women's table tennis
Representing South Korea
World Cup
Bronze medal – third place	2019 Tokyo	Team
Asian Games
Bronze medal – third place	2018 Jakarta	Team
Asian Championships
Silver medal – second place	2021 Doha	Team
Bronze medal – third place	2025 Bhubaneswar	Team

- Choi Hyo-joo
- Hangul: 최효주
- Hanja: 崔孝珠
- RR: Choe Hyoju
- MR: Ch'oe Hyoju

Yao Yao
- Traditional Chinese: 姚堯
- Simplified Chinese: 姚尧
Transcriptions
Standard Mandarin
- Hanyu Pinyin: Yáo Yáo

Choi Hyo-joo (Korean: 최효주, born 15 April 1998) is a Chinese-South Korean table tennis player. Born in China as Yao Yao (Chinese: 姚尧), she became a naturalized South Korean citizen in November 2013.

She represented South Korea at the team event in the 2020 Summer Olympics.

== Early life and move to Korea ==
A Jiangsu native, Choi (then known as Yao Yao) attended a table tennis school in Qingdao, Shandong at a young age. In 2009, she finished 8th in the national cadet tournament, behind the likes of Chen Meng, Gu Yuting, Shao Jieni, and Zhu Yuling. She was spotted by Choi Young-il, head coach of the Korean club Samsung Life, who persuaded her to go to South Korea and acquire Korean nationality. Several people helped out with her naturalization: the mother of Jeong Sang-eun, another Chinese-born South Korean player, and Coach Choi's older brother, a public employee, who volunteered to foster her. Later, when she became a naturalized Korean, she adopted the surname Choi.

== Achievements ==
=== ITTF Tours ===
Women's singles

Year	Tournament	Level	Final opponent	Score	Rank
2015	Croatia Open	Challenge	Shan Xiaona	4–1	1st place, gold medalist(s)

Women's doubles

Year	Tournament	Level	Partner	Final opponents	Score	Rank
2019	Korea Open	World Tour	Yang Ha-eun	Chen Meng; Wang Manyu	0–3	2nd place, silver medalist(s)
