= 2018 ITTF World Tour =

Table tennis tour 2018

Details
- Duration: 18 January 2018 – 16 December 2018
- Edition: 23rd
- Tournaments: 12 + Grand Finals
- Categories: World Tour Platinum (6); World Tour (6)

Achievements (singles)
- Most titles: Men: (China) Fan Zhendong (3); Women: (China) Wang Manyu (3)
- Most finals: Men: (China) Xu Xin (5); Women: (China) Wang Manyu (6)
- Points leader: Men: (China) Xu Xin (1750); Women: (China) Wang Manyu (1856)

The 2018 ITTF World Tour was the 23rd season of the International Table Tennis Federation's professional table tennis world tour.

For the first time in its history, the tour included mixed doubles competitions in 2018. They featured at six events: the China Open, Japan Open, Korea Open, Australian Open and Austrian Open, as well as at the Grand Finals. This was to promote the mixed doubles category prior to its inclusion on the 2020 Olympics programme.

== Schedule ==
The tournaments in the 2018 tour were split into two tiers: World Tour Platinum and World Tour. The Platinum events offered higher prize money and more points towards the ITTF World Tour standings, which determined the qualifiers for the ITTF World Tour Grand Finals in December.

Below is the 2018 schedule announced by the International Table Tennis Federation:

Key

Grand Finals
World Tour Platinum
World Tour

No.	Date	Tournament	Location	Venue	Prize (USD)	Report	Ref.
1	18–21 January	(Hungary) Hungarian Open	Budapest	Budapest Olympic Hall	150,000	Report	
2	8–11 March	Qatar Open	Doha	Ali Bin Hamad al-Attiyah Arena	235,000	Report	
3	23–25 March	(Germany) German Open	Bremen	ÖVB Arena	235,000	Report	
4	24–27 May	Hong Kong Open	Hong Kong	Queen Elizabeth Stadium	145,000	Report	
5	31 May–3 June	China Open	Shenzhen	Bao'an District Sports Center	346,000	Report	
6	8–10 June	Japan Open	Kitakyushu	Kitakyushu City General Gymnasium	170,000	Report	
7	19–22 July	(South Korea) Korea Open	Daejeon	Chungmu Sports Arena	266,000	Report	
8	26–29 July	(Australia) Australian Open	Geelong	Geelong Arena	316,000	Report	
9	16–19 August	Bulgaria Open	Panagyurishte	Arena Asarel	160,000	Report	
10	23–26 August	(Czech Republic) Czech Open	Olomouc	OMEGA Sport Center	160,000	Report	
11	1–4 November	(Sweden) Swedish Open	Stockholm	Eriksdalshallen (Main venue); Skanstullshallen (Second venue)	150,000	Report	
12	8–11 November	(Austria) Austrian Open	Linz	TipsArena Linz	251,000	Report	
13	13–16 December	(South Korea) Grand Finals	Incheon	Namdong Gymnasium	1,001,000	Report	

== Results ==
Date	Tournament	Champions	Runners-up
18–21 January	Hungarian Open: Location: Budapest, Hungary; Venue: Budapest Olympic Hall; Category: World Tour; Prize: $150,000; Draws: 32MS/32WS/16MD/16WD; Singles: Men / Women; Doubles: Men / Women	(China) Fan Zhendong	(China) Wang Chuqin
18–21 January	Hungarian Open: Location: Budapest, Hungary; Venue: Budapest Olympic Hall; Category: World Tour; Prize: $150,000; Draws: 32MS/32WS/16MD/16WD; Singles: Men / Women; Doubles: Men / Women	Score: 4–1 (11–6, 9–11, 11–7, 14–12, 11–3)	
18–21 January	Hungarian Open: Location: Budapest, Hungary; Venue: Budapest Olympic Hall; Category: World Tour; Prize: $150,000; Draws: 32MS/32WS/16MD/16WD; Singles: Men / Women; Doubles: Men / Women	(China) Wang Manyu	(China) Sun Yingsha
18–21 January	Hungarian Open: Location: Budapest, Hungary; Venue: Budapest Olympic Hall; Category: World Tour; Prize: $150,000; Draws: 32MS/32WS/16MD/16WD; Singles: Men / Women; Doubles: Men / Women	Score: 4–3 (9–11, 11–6, 10–12, 11–8, 9–11, 11–8, 11–4)	
18–21 January	Hungarian Open: Location: Budapest, Hungary; Venue: Budapest Olympic Hall; Category: World Tour; Prize: $150,000; Draws: 32MS/32WS/16MD/16WD; Singles: Men / Women; Doubles: Men / Women	(China) Fan Zhendong (China) Yu Ziyang	(Belarus) Pavel Platonov (Belarus) Vladimir Samsonov
18–21 January	Hungarian Open: Location: Budapest, Hungary; Venue: Budapest Olympic Hall; Category: World Tour; Prize: $150,000; Draws: 32MS/32WS/16MD/16WD; Singles: Men / Women; Doubles: Men / Women	Score: 3–0 (11–5, 11–5, 11–4)	
18–21 January	Hungarian Open: Location: Budapest, Hungary; Venue: Budapest Olympic Hall; Category: World Tour; Prize: $150,000; Draws: 32MS/32WS/16MD/16WD; Singles: Men / Women; Doubles: Men / Women	(China) Chen Xingtong (China) Sun Yingsha	(China) Chen Ke (China) Wang Manyu
18–21 January	Hungarian Open: Location: Budapest, Hungary; Venue: Budapest Olympic Hall; Category: World Tour; Prize: $150,000; Draws: 32MS/32WS/16MD/16WD; Singles: Men / Women; Doubles: Men / Women	Score: 3–0 (14–12, 11–8, 11–8)	
8–11 March	Qatar Open: Location: Doha, Qatar; Venue: Ali Bin Hamad al-Attiyah Arena; Category: World Tour Platinum; Prize: $235,000; Draws: 32MS/32WS/16MD/16WD; Singles: Men / Women; Doubles: Men / Women	(China) Fan Zhendong	(Brazil) Hugo Calderano
8–11 March	Qatar Open: Location: Doha, Qatar; Venue: Ali Bin Hamad al-Attiyah Arena; Category: World Tour Platinum; Prize: $235,000; Draws: 32MS/32WS/16MD/16WD; Singles: Men / Women; Doubles: Men / Women	Score: 4–0 (13–11, 12–10, 11–7, 11–7)	
8–11 March	Qatar Open: Location: Doha, Qatar; Venue: Ali Bin Hamad al-Attiyah Arena; Category: World Tour Platinum; Prize: $235,000; Draws: 32MS/32WS/16MD/16WD; Singles: Men / Women; Doubles: Men / Women	(China) Liu Shiwen	(China) Wang Manyu
8–11 March	Qatar Open: Location: Doha, Qatar; Venue: Ali Bin Hamad al-Attiyah Arena; Category: World Tour Platinum; Prize: $235,000; Draws: 32MS/32WS/16MD/16WD; Singles: Men / Women; Doubles: Men / Women	Score: 4–2 (8–11, 10–12, 11–9, 11–6, 11–5, 11–6)	
8–11 March	Qatar Open: Location: Doha, Qatar; Venue: Ali Bin Hamad al-Attiyah Arena; Category: World Tour Platinum; Prize: $235,000; Draws: 32MS/32WS/16MD/16WD; Singles: Men / Women; Doubles: Men / Women	(China) Fan Zhendong (China) Xu Xin	(Japan) Jun Mizutani (Japan) Yuya Oshima
8–11 March	Qatar Open: Location: Doha, Qatar; Venue: Ali Bin Hamad al-Attiyah Arena; Category: World Tour Platinum; Prize: $235,000; Draws: 32MS/32WS/16MD/16WD; Singles: Men / Women; Doubles: Men / Women	Score: 3–1 (9–11, 11–5, 11–9, 13–11)	
8–11 March	Qatar Open: Location: Doha, Qatar; Venue: Ali Bin Hamad al-Attiyah Arena; Category: World Tour Platinum; Prize: $235,000; Draws: 32MS/32WS/16MD/16WD; Singles: Men / Women; Doubles: Men / Women	(China) Chen Ke (China) Wang Manyu	(China) Chen Xingtong (China) Sun Yingsha
8–11 March	Qatar Open: Location: Doha, Qatar; Venue: Ali Bin Hamad al-Attiyah Arena; Category: World Tour Platinum; Prize: $235,000; Draws: 32MS/32WS/16MD/16WD; Singles: Men / Women; Doubles: Men / Women	Score: 3–1 (8–11, 11–2, 11–4, 11–4)	
23–25 March	German Open: Location: Bremen, Germany; Venue: ÖVB Arena; Category: World Tour Platinum; Prize: $235,000; Draws: 32MS/32WS/16MD/16WD; Singles: Men / Women; Doubles: Men / Women	(China) Ma Long	(China) Xu Xin
23–25 March	German Open: Location: Bremen, Germany; Venue: ÖVB Arena; Category: World Tour Platinum; Prize: $235,000; Draws: 32MS/32WS/16MD/16WD; Singles: Men / Women; Doubles: Men / Women	Score: 4–1 (11–9, 9–11, 11–9, 11–9, 11–6)	
23–25 March	German Open: Location: Bremen, Germany; Venue: ÖVB Arena; Category: World Tour Platinum; Prize: $235,000; Draws: 32MS/32WS/16MD/16WD; Singles: Men / Women; Doubles: Men / Women	(Japan) Kasumi Ishikawa	(South Korea) Seo Hyo-won
23–25 March	German Open: Location: Bremen, Germany; Venue: ÖVB Arena; Category: World Tour Platinum; Prize: $235,000; Draws: 32MS/32WS/16MD/16WD; Singles: Men / Women; Doubles: Men / Women	Score: 4–1 (11–9, 10–12, 11–6, 11–7, 11–6)	
23–25 March	German Open: Location: Bremen, Germany; Venue: ÖVB Arena; Category: World Tour Platinum; Prize: $235,000; Draws: 32MS/32WS/16MD/16WD; Singles: Men / Women; Doubles: Men / Women	(China) Ma Long (China) Xu Xin	(South Korea) Jung Young-sik (South Korea) Lee Sang-su
23–25 March	German Open: Location: Bremen, Germany; Venue: ÖVB Arena; Category: World Tour Platinum; Prize: $235,000; Draws: 32MS/32WS/16MD/16WD; Singles: Men / Women; Doubles: Men / Women	Score: 3–0 (11–7, 11–8, 11–9)	
23–25 March	German Open: Location: Bremen, Germany; Venue: ÖVB Arena; Category: World Tour Platinum; Prize: $235,000; Draws: 32MS/32WS/16MD/16WD; Singles: Men / Women; Doubles: Men / Women	(Japan) Hina Hayata (Japan) Mima Ito	(South Korea) Jeon Ji-hee (South Korea) Yang Ha-eun
23–25 March	German Open: Location: Bremen, Germany; Venue: ÖVB Arena; Category: World Tour Platinum; Prize: $235,000; Draws: 32MS/32WS/16MD/16WD; Singles: Men / Women; Doubles: Men / Women	Score: 3–1 (11–3, 11–5, 10–12, 11–6)	
24–27 May	Hong Kong Open: Location: Hong Kong; Venue: Queen Elizabeth Stadium; Category: World Tour; Prize: $145,000; Draws: 32MS/32WS/16MD/16WD; Singles: Men / Women; Doubles: Men / Women	(Japan) Kazuhiro Yoshimura	(South Korea) Cho Seung-min
24–27 May	Hong Kong Open: Location: Hong Kong; Venue: Queen Elizabeth Stadium; Category: World Tour; Prize: $145,000; Draws: 32MS/32WS/16MD/16WD; Singles: Men / Women; Doubles: Men / Women	Score: 4–1 (11–5, 5–11, 11–8, 11–3, 11–7)	
24–27 May	Hong Kong Open: Location: Hong Kong; Venue: Queen Elizabeth Stadium; Category: World Tour; Prize: $145,000; Draws: 32MS/32WS/16MD/16WD; Singles: Men / Women; Doubles: Men / Women	(China) Wang Manyu	(China) Chen Xingtong
24–27 May	Hong Kong Open: Location: Hong Kong; Venue: Queen Elizabeth Stadium; Category: World Tour; Prize: $145,000; Draws: 32MS/32WS/16MD/16WD; Singles: Men / Women; Doubles: Men / Women	Score: 4–2 (12–10, 11–8, 3–11, 11–6, 4–11, 11–9)	
24–27 May	Hong Kong Open: Location: Hong Kong; Venue: Queen Elizabeth Stadium; Category: World Tour; Prize: $145,000; Draws: 32MS/32WS/16MD/16WD; Singles: Men / Women; Doubles: Men / Women	(Hong Kong) Ho Kwan Kit (Hong Kong) Wong Chun Ting	(Japan) Masataka Morizono (Japan) Yuya Oshima
24–27 May	Hong Kong Open: Location: Hong Kong; Venue: Queen Elizabeth Stadium; Category: World Tour; Prize: $145,000; Draws: 32MS/32WS/16MD/16WD; Singles: Men / Women; Doubles: Men / Women	Score: 3–0 (11–6, 11–3, 11–9)	
24–27 May	Hong Kong Open: Location: Hong Kong; Venue: Queen Elizabeth Stadium; Category: World Tour; Prize: $145,000; Draws: 32MS/32WS/16MD/16WD; Singles: Men / Women; Doubles: Men / Women	(China) Chen Xingtong (China) Sun Yingsha	(China) Chen Ke (China) Wang Manyu
24–27 May	Hong Kong Open: Location: Hong Kong; Venue: Queen Elizabeth Stadium; Category: World Tour; Prize: $145,000; Draws: 32MS/32WS/16MD/16WD; Singles: Men / Women; Doubles: Men / Women	Score: 3–0 (11–9, 11–8, 11–9)	
31 May–3 June	China Open: Location: Shenzhen, China; Venue: Bao'an District Sports Center; Category: World Tour Platinum; Prize: $346,000; Draws: 32MS/32WS/16MD/16WD/16XD; Singles: Men / Women; Doubles: Men / Women / Mixed	(China) Ma Long	(China) Fan Zhendong
31 May–3 June	China Open: Location: Shenzhen, China; Venue: Bao'an District Sports Center; Category: World Tour Platinum; Prize: $346,000; Draws: 32MS/32WS/16MD/16WD/16XD; Singles: Men / Women; Doubles: Men / Women / Mixed	Score: 4–1 (7–11, 11–8, 11–4, 11–3, 14–12)	
31 May–3 June	China Open: Location: Shenzhen, China; Venue: Bao'an District Sports Center; Category: World Tour Platinum; Prize: $346,000; Draws: 32MS/32WS/16MD/16WD/16XD; Singles: Men / Women; Doubles: Men / Women / Mixed	(China) Wang Manyu	(China) Ding Ning
31 May–3 June	China Open: Location: Shenzhen, China; Venue: Bao'an District Sports Center; Category: World Tour Platinum; Prize: $346,000; Draws: 32MS/32WS/16MD/16WD/16XD; Singles: Men / Women; Doubles: Men / Women / Mixed	Score: 4–3 (13–11, 9–11, 9–11, 11–9, 11–8, 9–11, 11–5)	
31 May–3 June	China Open: Location: Shenzhen, China; Venue: Bao'an District Sports Center; Category: World Tour Platinum; Prize: $346,000; Draws: 32MS/32WS/16MD/16WD/16XD; Singles: Men / Women; Doubles: Men / Women / Mixed	(China) Fan Zhendong (China) Lin Gaoyuan	(Romania) Ovidiu Ionescu (Spain) Álvaro Robles
31 May–3 June	China Open: Location: Shenzhen, China; Venue: Bao'an District Sports Center; Category: World Tour Platinum; Prize: $346,000; Draws: 32MS/32WS/16MD/16WD/16XD; Singles: Men / Women; Doubles: Men / Women / Mixed	Score: 3–0 (11–9, 11–4, 11–4)	
31 May–3 June	China Open: Location: Shenzhen, China; Venue: Bao'an District Sports Center; Category: World Tour Platinum; Prize: $346,000; Draws: 32MS/32WS/16MD/16WD/16XD; Singles: Men / Women; Doubles: Men / Women / Mixed	(China) Ding Ning (China) Zhu Yuling	(South Korea) Jeon Ji-hee (South Korea) Yang Ha-eun
31 May–3 June	China Open: Location: Shenzhen, China; Venue: Bao'an District Sports Center; Category: World Tour Platinum; Prize: $346,000; Draws: 32MS/32WS/16MD/16WD/16XD; Singles: Men / Women; Doubles: Men / Women / Mixed	Score: 3–1 (11–9, 11–5, 4–11, 11–5)	
31 May–3 June	China Open: Location: Shenzhen, China; Venue: Bao'an District Sports Center; Category: World Tour Platinum; Prize: $346,000; Draws: 32MS/32WS/16MD/16WD/16XD; Singles: Men / Women; Doubles: Men / Women / Mixed	(China) Lin Gaoyuan (China) Chen Xingtong	(Japan) Masataka Morizono (Japan) Mima Ito
31 May–3 June	China Open: Location: Shenzhen, China; Venue: Bao'an District Sports Center; Category: World Tour Platinum; Prize: $346,000; Draws: 32MS/32WS/16MD/16WD/16XD; Singles: Men / Women; Doubles: Men / Women / Mixed	Score: 3–1 (13–11, 7–11, 11–5, 11–8)	
8–10 June	Japan Open: Location: Kitakyushu, Japan; Venue: Kitakyushu City General Gymnasium; Category: World Tour; Prize: $170,000; Draws: 32MS/32WS/16MD/16WD/16XD; Singles: Men / Women; Doubles: Men / Women / Mixed	(Japan) Tomokazu Harimoto	(China) Zhang Jike
8–10 June	Japan Open: Location: Kitakyushu, Japan; Venue: Kitakyushu City General Gymnasium; Category: World Tour; Prize: $170,000; Draws: 32MS/32WS/16MD/16WD/16XD; Singles: Men / Women; Doubles: Men / Women / Mixed	Score: 4–3 (9–11, 8–11, 11–9, 11–4, 10–12, 11–7, 13–11)	
8–10 June	Japan Open: Location: Kitakyushu, Japan; Venue: Kitakyushu City General Gymnasium; Category: World Tour; Prize: $170,000; Draws: 32MS/32WS/16MD/16WD/16XD; Singles: Men / Women; Doubles: Men / Women / Mixed	(Japan) Mima Ito	(China) Wang Manyu
8–10 June	Japan Open: Location: Kitakyushu, Japan; Venue: Kitakyushu City General Gymnasium; Category: World Tour; Prize: $170,000; Draws: 32MS/32WS/16MD/16WD/16XD; Singles: Men / Women; Doubles: Men / Women / Mixed	Score: 4–2 (11–7, 12–10, 8–11, 11–7, 6–11, 12–10)	
8–10 June	Japan Open: Location: Kitakyushu, Japan; Venue: Kitakyushu City General Gymnasium; Category: World Tour; Prize: $170,000; Draws: 32MS/32WS/16MD/16WD/16XD; Singles: Men / Women; Doubles: Men / Women / Mixed	(South Korea) Jung Young-sik (South Korea) Lee Sang-su	(China) Liang Jingkun (China) Zhou Kai
8–10 June	Japan Open: Location: Kitakyushu, Japan; Venue: Kitakyushu City General Gymnasium; Category: World Tour; Prize: $170,000; Draws: 32MS/32WS/16MD/16WD/16XD; Singles: Men / Women; Doubles: Men / Women / Mixed	Score: 3–1 (11–6, 5–11, 11–9, 11–5)	
8–10 June	Japan Open: Location: Kitakyushu, Japan; Venue: Kitakyushu City General Gymnasium; Category: World Tour; Prize: $170,000; Draws: 32MS/32WS/16MD/16WD/16XD; Singles: Men / Women; Doubles: Men / Women / Mixed	(China) Gu Yuting (China) Mu Zi	(China) Liu Shiwen (China) Wang Manyu
8–10 June	Japan Open: Location: Kitakyushu, Japan; Venue: Kitakyushu City General Gymnasium; Category: World Tour; Prize: $170,000; Draws: 32MS/32WS/16MD/16WD/16XD; Singles: Men / Women; Doubles: Men / Women / Mixed	w/o	
8–10 June	Japan Open: Location: Kitakyushu, Japan; Venue: Kitakyushu City General Gymnasium; Category: World Tour; Prize: $170,000; Draws: 32MS/32WS/16MD/16WD/16XD; Singles: Men / Women; Doubles: Men / Women / Mixed	(China) Liang Jingkun (China) Chen Xingtong	(Japan) Maharu Yoshimura (Japan) Kasumi Ishikawa
8–10 June	Japan Open: Location: Kitakyushu, Japan; Venue: Kitakyushu City General Gymnasium; Category: World Tour; Prize: $170,000; Draws: 32MS/32WS/16MD/16WD/16XD; Singles: Men / Women; Doubles: Men / Women / Mixed	Score: 3–0 (11–9, 11–9, 11–9)	
19–22 July	Korea Open: Location: Daejeon, South Korea; Venue: Chungmu Sports Arena; Category: World Tour Platinum; Prize: $266,000; Draws: 32MS/32WS/16MD/16WD/16XD; Singles: Men / Women; Doubles: Men / Women / Mixed	(South Korea) Jang Woo-jin	(China) Liang Jingkun
19–22 July	Korea Open: Location: Daejeon, South Korea; Venue: Chungmu Sports Arena; Category: World Tour Platinum; Prize: $266,000; Draws: 32MS/32WS/16MD/16WD/16XD; Singles: Men / Women; Doubles: Men / Women / Mixed	Score: 4–0 (11–8, 11–9, 11–7, 11–3)	
19–22 July	Korea Open: Location: Daejeon, South Korea; Venue: Chungmu Sports Arena; Category: World Tour Platinum; Prize: $266,000; Draws: 32MS/32WS/16MD/16WD/16XD; Singles: Men / Women; Doubles: Men / Women / Mixed	(China) Zhu Yuling	(China) Chen Meng
19–22 July	Korea Open: Location: Daejeon, South Korea; Venue: Chungmu Sports Arena; Category: World Tour Platinum; Prize: $266,000; Draws: 32MS/32WS/16MD/16WD/16XD; Singles: Men / Women; Doubles: Men / Women / Mixed	Score: 4–1 (11–4, 7–11, 11–8, 11–5, 11–9)	
19–22 July	Korea Open: Location: Daejeon, South Korea; Venue: Chungmu Sports Arena; Category: World Tour Platinum; Prize: $266,000; Draws: 32MS/32WS/16MD/16WD/16XD; Singles: Men / Women; Doubles: Men / Women / Mixed	(South Korea) Jang Woo-jin (South Korea) Lim Jong-hoon	(Hong Kong) Ho Kwan Kit (Hong Kong) Wong Chun Ting
19–22 July	Korea Open: Location: Daejeon, South Korea; Venue: Chungmu Sports Arena; Category: World Tour Platinum; Prize: $266,000; Draws: 32MS/32WS/16MD/16WD/16XD; Singles: Men / Women; Doubles: Men / Women / Mixed	Score: 3–1 (11–8, 19–17, 9–11, 11–9)	
19–22 July	Korea Open: Location: Daejeon, South Korea; Venue: Chungmu Sports Arena; Category: World Tour Platinum; Prize: $266,000; Draws: 32MS/32WS/16MD/16WD/16XD; Singles: Men / Women; Doubles: Men / Women / Mixed	(China) Chen Meng (China) Ding Ning	(China) Wang Manyu (China) Zhu Yuling
19–22 July	Korea Open: Location: Daejeon, South Korea; Venue: Chungmu Sports Arena; Category: World Tour Platinum; Prize: $266,000; Draws: 32MS/32WS/16MD/16WD/16XD; Singles: Men / Women; Doubles: Men / Women / Mixed	Score: 3–1 (14–12, 9–11, 11–9, 13–11)	
19–22 July	Korea Open: Location: Daejeon, South Korea; Venue: Chungmu Sports Arena; Category: World Tour Platinum; Prize: $266,000; Draws: 32MS/32WS/16MD/16WD/16XD; Singles: Men / Women; Doubles: Men / Women / Mixed	(South Korea) Jang Woo-jin (North Korea) Cha Hyo Sim	(China) Wang Chuqin (China) Sun Yingsha
19–22 July	Korea Open: Location: Daejeon, South Korea; Venue: Chungmu Sports Arena; Category: World Tour Platinum; Prize: $266,000; Draws: 32MS/32WS/16MD/16WD/16XD; Singles: Men / Women; Doubles: Men / Women / Mixed	Score: 3–1 (5–11, 11–3, 11–4, 11–8)	
26–29 July	Australian Open: Location: Geelong, Australia; Venue: Geelong Arena; Category: World Tour Platinum; Prize: $316,000; Draws: 32MS/32WS/16MD/16WD/16XD; Singles: Men / Women; Doubles: Men / Women / Mixed	(China) Xu Xin	(China) Liu Dingshuo
26–29 July	Australian Open: Location: Geelong, Australia; Venue: Geelong Arena; Category: World Tour Platinum; Prize: $316,000; Draws: 32MS/32WS/16MD/16WD/16XD; Singles: Men / Women; Doubles: Men / Women / Mixed	Score: 4–1 (12–10, 4–11, 12–10, 15–13, 11–6)	
26–29 July	Australian Open: Location: Geelong, Australia; Venue: Geelong Arena; Category: World Tour Platinum; Prize: $316,000; Draws: 32MS/32WS/16MD/16WD/16XD; Singles: Men / Women; Doubles: Men / Women / Mixed	(China) Liu Shiwen	(China) Ding Ning
26–29 July	Australian Open: Location: Geelong, Australia; Venue: Geelong Arena; Category: World Tour Platinum; Prize: $316,000; Draws: 32MS/32WS/16MD/16WD/16XD; Singles: Men / Women; Doubles: Men / Women / Mixed	Score: 4–3 (11–5, 11–7, 3–11, 5–11, 6–11, 11–5, 11–6)	
26–29 July	Australian Open: Location: Geelong, Australia; Venue: Geelong Arena; Category: World Tour Platinum; Prize: $316,000; Draws: 32MS/32WS/16MD/16WD/16XD; Singles: Men / Women; Doubles: Men / Women / Mixed	(South Korea) Jung Young-sik (South Korea) Lee Sang-su	(Japan) Masataka Morizono (Japan) Yuya Oshima
26–29 July	Australian Open: Location: Geelong, Australia; Venue: Geelong Arena; Category: World Tour Platinum; Prize: $316,000; Draws: 32MS/32WS/16MD/16WD/16XD; Singles: Men / Women; Doubles: Men / Women / Mixed	Score: 3–0 (14–12, 11–5, 11–7)	
26–29 July	Australian Open: Location: Geelong, Australia; Venue: Geelong Arena; Category: World Tour Platinum; Prize: $316,000; Draws: 32MS/32WS/16MD/16WD/16XD; Singles: Men / Women; Doubles: Men / Women / Mixed	(Japan) Hina Hayata (Japan) Mima Ito	(Japan) Honoka Hashimoto (Japan) Hitomi Sato
26–29 July	Australian Open: Location: Geelong, Australia; Venue: Geelong Arena; Category: World Tour Platinum; Prize: $316,000; Draws: 32MS/32WS/16MD/16WD/16XD; Singles: Men / Women; Doubles: Men / Women / Mixed	Score: 3–0 (11–8, 11–9, 11–7)	
26–29 July	Australian Open: Location: Geelong, Australia; Venue: Geelong Arena; Category: World Tour Platinum; Prize: $316,000; Draws: 32MS/32WS/16MD/16WD/16XD; Singles: Men / Women; Doubles: Men / Women / Mixed	(South Korea) Lee Sang-su (South Korea) Jeon Ji-hee	(South Korea) Lim Jong-hoon (South Korea) Yang Ha-eun
26–29 July	Australian Open: Location: Geelong, Australia; Venue: Geelong Arena; Category: World Tour Platinum; Prize: $316,000; Draws: 32MS/32WS/16MD/16WD/16XD; Singles: Men / Women; Doubles: Men / Women / Mixed	Score: 3–2 (6–11, 11–7, 5–11, 11–8, 11–8)	
16–19 August	Bulgaria Open: Location: Panagyurishte, Bulgaria; Venue: Arena Asarel; Category: World Tour; Prize: $160,000; Draws: 32MS/32WS/16MD/16WD; Singles: Men / Women; Doubles: Men / Women	(China) Xu Xin	(Japan) Kenta Matsudaira
16–19 August	Bulgaria Open: Location: Panagyurishte, Bulgaria; Venue: Arena Asarel; Category: World Tour; Prize: $160,000; Draws: 32MS/32WS/16MD/16WD; Singles: Men / Women; Doubles: Men / Women	Score: 4–1 (12–10, 10–12, 11–8, 11–6, 11–4)	
16–19 August	Bulgaria Open: Location: Panagyurishte, Bulgaria; Venue: Arena Asarel; Category: World Tour; Prize: $160,000; Draws: 32MS/32WS/16MD/16WD; Singles: Men / Women; Doubles: Men / Women	(China) Ding Ning	(China) Wang Yidi
16–19 August	Bulgaria Open: Location: Panagyurishte, Bulgaria; Venue: Arena Asarel; Category: World Tour; Prize: $160,000; Draws: 32MS/32WS/16MD/16WD; Singles: Men / Women; Doubles: Men / Women	Score: 4–3 (11–7, 10–12, 8–11, 11–8, 11–6, 4–11, 11–2)	
16–19 August	Bulgaria Open: Location: Panagyurishte, Bulgaria; Venue: Arena Asarel; Category: World Tour; Prize: $160,000; Draws: 32MS/32WS/16MD/16WD; Singles: Men / Women; Doubles: Men / Women	(China) Ma Long (China) Xu Xin	(Japan) Masataka Morizono (Japan) Yuya Oshima
16–19 August	Bulgaria Open: Location: Panagyurishte, Bulgaria; Venue: Arena Asarel; Category: World Tour; Prize: $160,000; Draws: 32MS/32WS/16MD/16WD; Singles: Men / Women; Doubles: Men / Women	Score: 3–1 (9–11, 11–4, 11–8, 11–6)	
16–19 August	Bulgaria Open: Location: Panagyurishte, Bulgaria; Venue: Arena Asarel; Category: World Tour; Prize: $160,000; Draws: 32MS/32WS/16MD/16WD; Singles: Men / Women; Doubles: Men / Women	(Japan) Kasumi Ishikawa (Japan) Mima Ito	(China) Liu Gaoyang (China) Zhang Rui
16–19 August	Bulgaria Open: Location: Panagyurishte, Bulgaria; Venue: Arena Asarel; Category: World Tour; Prize: $160,000; Draws: 32MS/32WS/16MD/16WD; Singles: Men / Women; Doubles: Men / Women	Score: 3–1 (10–12, 11–7, 11–7, 11–6)	
23–26 August	Czech Open: Location: Olomouc, Czech Republic; Venue: OMEGA Sport Center; Category: World Tour; Prize: $160,000; Draws: 32MS/32WS/16MD/16WD; Singles: Men / Women; Doubles: Men / Women	(China) Zheng Peifeng	(Portugal) Marcos Freitas
23–26 August	Czech Open: Location: Olomouc, Czech Republic; Venue: OMEGA Sport Center; Category: World Tour; Prize: $160,000; Draws: 32MS/32WS/16MD/16WD; Singles: Men / Women; Doubles: Men / Women	Score: 4–2 (13–11, 6–11, 8–11, 11–7, 11–8, 11–6)	
23–26 August	Czech Open: Location: Olomouc, Czech Republic; Venue: OMEGA Sport Center; Category: World Tour; Prize: $160,000; Draws: 32MS/32WS/16MD/16WD; Singles: Men / Women; Doubles: Men / Women	(Japan) Kasumi Ishikawa	(China) Wen Jia
23–26 August	Czech Open: Location: Olomouc, Czech Republic; Venue: OMEGA Sport Center; Category: World Tour; Prize: $160,000; Draws: 32MS/32WS/16MD/16WD; Singles: Men / Women; Doubles: Men / Women	Score: 4–2 (8–11, 11–8, 11–4, 7–11, 11–6, 13–11)	
23–26 August	Czech Open: Location: Olomouc, Czech Republic; Venue: OMEGA Sport Center; Category: World Tour; Prize: $160,000; Draws: 32MS/32WS/16MD/16WD; Singles: Men / Women; Doubles: Men / Women	(Germany) Patrick Franziska (Denmark) Jonathan Groth	(Sweden) Mattias Falck (Sweden) Kristian Karlsson
23–26 August	Czech Open: Location: Olomouc, Czech Republic; Venue: OMEGA Sport Center; Category: World Tour; Prize: $160,000; Draws: 32MS/32WS/16MD/16WD; Singles: Men / Women; Doubles: Men / Women	Score: 3–1 (11–5, 9–11, 12–10, 11–7)	
23–26 August	Czech Open: Location: Olomouc, Czech Republic; Venue: OMEGA Sport Center; Category: World Tour; Prize: $160,000; Draws: 32MS/32WS/16MD/16WD; Singles: Men / Women; Doubles: Men / Women	(China) Liu Gaoyang (China) Zhang Rui	(Croatia) Sun Jiayi (Singapore) Zeng Jian
23–26 August	Czech Open: Location: Olomouc, Czech Republic; Venue: OMEGA Sport Center; Category: World Tour; Prize: $160,000; Draws: 32MS/32WS/16MD/16WD; Singles: Men / Women; Doubles: Men / Women	Score: 3–0 (11–6, 13–11, 11–2)	
1–4 November	Swedish Open: Location: Stockholm, Sweden; Venue: Eriksdalshallen (Main venue) Skanstullshallen (Second venue); Category: World Tour; Prize: $150,000; Draws: 32MS/32WS/16MD/16WD; Singles: Men / Women; Doubles: Men / Women	(China) Fan Zhendong	(China) Xu Xin
1–4 November	Swedish Open: Location: Stockholm, Sweden; Venue: Eriksdalshallen (Main venue) Skanstullshallen (Second venue); Category: World Tour; Prize: $150,000; Draws: 32MS/32WS/16MD/16WD; Singles: Men / Women; Doubles: Men / Women	Score: 4–1 (11–7, 14–12, 13–11, 9–11, 11–9)	
1–4 November	Swedish Open: Location: Stockholm, Sweden; Venue: Eriksdalshallen (Main venue) Skanstullshallen (Second venue); Category: World Tour; Prize: $150,000; Draws: 32MS/32WS/16MD/16WD; Singles: Men / Women; Doubles: Men / Women	(Japan) Mima Ito	(China) Zhu Yuling
1–4 November	Swedish Open: Location: Stockholm, Sweden; Venue: Eriksdalshallen (Main venue) Skanstullshallen (Second venue); Category: World Tour; Prize: $150,000; Draws: 32MS/32WS/16MD/16WD; Singles: Men / Women; Doubles: Men / Women	Score: 4–0 (11–3, 11–3, 11–5, 11–8)	
1–4 November	Swedish Open: Location: Stockholm, Sweden; Venue: Eriksdalshallen (Main venue) Skanstullshallen (Second venue); Category: World Tour; Prize: $150,000; Draws: 32MS/32WS/16MD/16WD; Singles: Men / Women; Doubles: Men / Women	(Chinese Taipei) Liao Cheng-ting (Chinese Taipei) Lin Yun-ju	(Sweden) Mattias Falck (Sweden) Kristian Karlsson
1–4 November	Swedish Open: Location: Stockholm, Sweden; Venue: Eriksdalshallen (Main venue) Skanstullshallen (Second venue); Category: World Tour; Prize: $150,000; Draws: 32MS/32WS/16MD/16WD; Singles: Men / Women; Doubles: Men / Women	Score: 3–2 (10–12, 11–8, 11–8, 6–11, 13–11)	
1–4 November	Swedish Open: Location: Stockholm, Sweden; Venue: Eriksdalshallen (Main venue) Skanstullshallen (Second venue); Category: World Tour; Prize: $150,000; Draws: 32MS/32WS/16MD/16WD; Singles: Men / Women; Doubles: Men / Women	(China) Chen Xingtong (China) Sun Yingsha	(China) Liu Gaoyang (China) Zhang Rui
1–4 November	Swedish Open: Location: Stockholm, Sweden; Venue: Eriksdalshallen (Main venue) Skanstullshallen (Second venue); Category: World Tour; Prize: $150,000; Draws: 32MS/32WS/16MD/16WD; Singles: Men / Women; Doubles: Men / Women	Score: 3–1 (11–5, 9–11, 11–7, 11–6)	
8–11 November	Austrian Open: Location: Linz, Austria; Venue: TipsArena Linz; Category: World Tour Platinum; Prize: $251,000; Draws: 32MS/32WS/16MD/16WD/16XD; Singles: Men / Women; Doubles: Men / Women / Mixed	(China) Liang Jingkun	(China) Xu Xin
8–11 November	Austrian Open: Location: Linz, Austria; Venue: TipsArena Linz; Category: World Tour Platinum; Prize: $251,000; Draws: 32MS/32WS/16MD/16WD/16XD; Singles: Men / Women; Doubles: Men / Women / Mixed	Score: 4–3 (11–5, 4–11, 11–6, 9–11, 13–11, 11–13, 11–2)	
8–11 November	Austrian Open: Location: Linz, Austria; Venue: TipsArena Linz; Category: World Tour Platinum; Prize: $251,000; Draws: 32MS/32WS/16MD/16WD/16XD; Singles: Men / Women; Doubles: Men / Women / Mixed	(China) Chen Meng	(China) Wang Manyu
8–11 November	Austrian Open: Location: Linz, Austria; Venue: TipsArena Linz; Category: World Tour Platinum; Prize: $251,000; Draws: 32MS/32WS/16MD/16WD/16XD; Singles: Men / Women; Doubles: Men / Women / Mixed	Score: 4–0 (11–8, 11–9, 11–4, 11–7)	
8–11 November	Austrian Open: Location: Linz, Austria; Venue: TipsArena Linz; Category: World Tour Platinum; Prize: $251,000; Draws: 32MS/32WS/16MD/16WD/16XD; Singles: Men / Women; Doubles: Men / Women / Mixed	(Japan) Masataka Morizono (Japan) Yuya Oshima	(South Korea) Jeoung Young-sik (South Korea) Lee Sang-su
8–11 November	Austrian Open: Location: Linz, Austria; Venue: TipsArena Linz; Category: World Tour Platinum; Prize: $251,000; Draws: 32MS/32WS/16MD/16WD/16XD; Singles: Men / Women; Doubles: Men / Women / Mixed	Score: 3–1 (12–10, 11–9, 3–11, 11–4)	
8–11 November	Austrian Open: Location: Linz, Austria; Venue: TipsArena Linz; Category: World Tour Platinum; Prize: $251,000; Draws: 32MS/32WS/16MD/16WD/16XD; Singles: Men / Women; Doubles: Men / Women / Mixed	(Japan) Hina Hayata (Japan) Mima Ito	(China) Chen Xingtong (China) Sun Yingsha
8–11 November	Austrian Open: Location: Linz, Austria; Venue: TipsArena Linz; Category: World Tour Platinum; Prize: $251,000; Draws: 32MS/32WS/16MD/16WD/16XD; Singles: Men / Women; Doubles: Men / Women / Mixed	Score: 3–0 (11–6, 11–7, 11–8)	
8–11 November	Austrian Open: Location: Linz, Austria; Venue: TipsArena Linz; Category: World Tour Platinum; Prize: $251,000; Draws: 32MS/32WS/16MD/16WD/16XD; Singles: Men / Women; Doubles: Men / Women / Mixed	(China) Xu Xin (China) Liu Shiwen	(Chinese Taipei) Chen Chien-an (Chinese Taipei) Cheng I-ching
8–11 November	Austrian Open: Location: Linz, Austria; Venue: TipsArena Linz; Category: World Tour Platinum; Prize: $251,000; Draws: 32MS/32WS/16MD/16WD/16XD; Singles: Men / Women; Doubles: Men / Women / Mixed	Score: 3–2 (9–11, 11–6, 11–9, 10–12, 11–5)	
13–16 December	Grand Finals: Location: Incheon, South Korea; Venue: Namdong Gymnasium; Category: Grand Finals; Prize: $1,001,000; Draws: 16MS/16WS/8MD/8WD/8XD; Singles: Men / Women; Doubles: Men / Women / Mixed	(Japan) Tomokazu Harimoto	(China) Lin Gaoyuan
13–16 December	Grand Finals: Location: Incheon, South Korea; Venue: Namdong Gymnasium; Category: Grand Finals; Prize: $1,001,000; Draws: 16MS/16WS/8MD/8WD/8XD; Singles: Men / Women; Doubles: Men / Women / Mixed	Score: 4–1 (11–4, 13–15, 11–9, 11–9, 11–9)	
13–16 December	Grand Finals: Location: Incheon, South Korea; Venue: Namdong Gymnasium; Category: Grand Finals; Prize: $1,001,000; Draws: 16MS/16WS/8MD/8WD/8XD; Singles: Men / Women; Doubles: Men / Women / Mixed	(China) Chen Meng	(China) He Zhuojia
13–16 December	Grand Finals: Location: Incheon, South Korea; Venue: Namdong Gymnasium; Category: Grand Finals; Prize: $1,001,000; Draws: 16MS/16WS/8MD/8WD/8XD; Singles: Men / Women; Doubles: Men / Women / Mixed	Score: 4–1 (9–11, 11–5, 11–8, 12–10, 11–7)	
13–16 December	Grand Finals: Location: Incheon, South Korea; Venue: Namdong Gymnasium; Category: Grand Finals; Prize: $1,001,000; Draws: 16MS/16WS/8MD/8WD/8XD; Singles: Men / Women; Doubles: Men / Women / Mixed	(South Korea) Jang Woo-jin (South Korea) Lim Jong-hoon	(Hong Kong) Ho Kwan Kit (Hong Kong) Wong Chun Ting
13–16 December	Grand Finals: Location: Incheon, South Korea; Venue: Namdong Gymnasium; Category: Grand Finals; Prize: $1,001,000; Draws: 16MS/16WS/8MD/8WD/8XD; Singles: Men / Women; Doubles: Men / Women / Mixed	Score: 3–2 (10–12, 13–11, 11–8, 10–12, 11–8)	
13–16 December	Grand Finals: Location: Incheon, South Korea; Venue: Namdong Gymnasium; Category: Grand Finals; Prize: $1,001,000; Draws: 16MS/16WS/8MD/8WD/8XD; Singles: Men / Women; Doubles: Men / Women / Mixed	(Japan) Hina Hayata (Japan) Mima Ito	(China) Chen Xingtong (China) Sun Yingsha
13–16 December	Grand Finals: Location: Incheon, South Korea; Venue: Namdong Gymnasium; Category: Grand Finals; Prize: $1,001,000; Draws: 16MS/16WS/8MD/8WD/8XD; Singles: Men / Women; Doubles: Men / Women / Mixed	Score: 3–0 (11–9, 13–11, 12–10)	
13–16 December	Grand Finals: Location: Incheon, South Korea; Venue: Namdong Gymnasium; Category: Grand Finals; Prize: $1,001,000; Draws: 16MS/16WS/8MD/8WD/8XD; Singles: Men / Women; Doubles: Men / Women / Mixed	(Hong Kong) Wong Chun Ting (Hong Kong) Doo Hoi Kem	(South Korea) Jang Woo-jin (North Korea) Cha Hyo-sim
13–16 December	Grand Finals: Location: Incheon, South Korea; Venue: Namdong Gymnasium; Category: Grand Finals; Prize: $1,001,000; Draws: 16MS/16WS/8MD/8WD/8XD; Singles: Men / Women; Doubles: Men / Women / Mixed	Score: 3–0 (11–6, 11–8, 11–4)	

== Grand Finals ==
The 2018 ITTF World Tour Grand Finals took place in Incheon, South Korea, from 13 to 16 December 2018.

== See also ==
- 2018 World Team Table Tennis Championships
- 2018 ITTF Men's World Cup
- 2018 ITTF Women's World Cup
- 2018 ITTF Team World Cup
- 2018 ITTF Challenge Series
- 2018 in table tennis
