= 2018 Hungarian Open (table tennis) =

Tournament details
- Dates: 18–21 January 2018
- Competitors: 32S / 16D
- Total prize money: US$150,000
- Venue: Budapest Olympic Hall
- Location: Budapest, Hungary

Champions
- Men's singles: (China) Fan Zhendong
- Women's singles: (China) Wang Manyu
- Men's doubles: (China) Fan Zhendong (China) Yu Ziyang
- Women's doubles: (China) Chen Xingtong (China) Sun Yingsha

The 2018 Hungarian Open was the first event of the 2018 ITTF World Tour. It took place from 18–21 January in Budapest, Hungary.

== Men's singles ==
=== Seeds ===
1. (China) Fan Zhendong (champion)
2. (Chinese Taipei) Chuang Chih-yuan (second round)
3. (Egypt) Omar Assar (first round)
4. (Brazil) Hugo Calderano (semifinals)
5. (Germany) Ruwen Filus (second round)
6. (Sweden) Kristian Karlsson (quarterfinals)
7. (Chinese Taipei) Chen Chien-an (quarterfinals)
8. (Belarus) Vladimir Samsonov (first round)
9. (France) Emmanuel Lebesson (first round)
10. (Germany) Ricardo Walther (first round)
11. (Sweden) Mattias Karlsson (first round)
12. (Ukraine) Kou Lei (second round)
13. (Denmark) Jonathan Groth (quarterfinals)
14. (Spain) Alvaro Robles (second round)
15. (England) Paul Drinkhall (first round)
16. (Hungary) Tamas Lakatos (first round)

=== Draw ===
==== Top half ====
First round
1	(China) Fan Zhendong	11	11	11	11
(China) Xue Fei	5	7	2	5
(Kazakhstan) Kirill Gerassimenko	9	11	11	6	11	8	11
11	(Sweden) Mattias Karlsson	11	4	9	11	9	11	4
16	(Hungary) Tamas Lakatos	11	11	1	10	5	4
(Portugal) Tiago Apolónia	9	9	11	12	11	11
(France) Quentin Robinot	11	12	8	5	7	9
6	(Sweden) Kristian Karlsson	7	10	11	11	11	11
8	(Belarus) Vladimir Samsonov	11	6	9	10	11	11	5
(Germany) Patrick Franziska	9	11	11	12	9	9	11
(Sweden) Jon Persson	12	9	10	8	13	6
12	(Ukraine) Kou Lei	10	11	12	11	11	11
15	(England) Paul Drinkhall	4	11	8	13	6	6
(Chinese Taipei) Liao Cheng-ting	11	9	11	11	11	11
(Chinese Taipei) Sun Chia-hung	8	9	4	11	7
4	(Brazil) Hugo Calderano	11	11	11	9	11

Second round
1	(China) Fan Zhendong	12	9	11	11	11
(Kazakhstan) K. Gerassimenko	10	11	5	8	4
(Portugal) Tiago Apolónia	7	10	8	9
6	(Sweden) Kristian Karlsson	11	12	11	11
(Germany) Patrick Franziska	9	11	11	6	12	11
12	(Ukraine) Kou Lei	11	8	2	11	10	7
(Chinese Taipei) Liao Cheng-ting	11	7	6	6	11	11	3
4	(Brazil) Hugo Calderano	6	11	11	11	8	9	11

Quarterfinals
1	(China) Fan Zhendong	9	11	11	11	11
6	(Sweden) Kristian Karlsson	11	6	8	9	6
(Germany) Patrick Franziska	11	7	7	13	9	7
4	(Brazil) Hugo Calderano	8	11	11	11	11	11

Semifinals
1	(China) Fan Zhendong	11	9	11	11	11
4	(Brazil) Hugo Calderano	8	11	7	8	5

==== Bottom half ====
First round
3	(Egypt) Omar Assar	7	4	8	14
(China) Xu Chenhao	11	11	11	16
(China) Liu Dingshuo	12	11	13	11
9	(France) Emmanuel Lebesson	10	9	11	8
13	(Denmark) Jonathan Groth	8	7	11	11	8	11	11
(Sweden) Truls Moregard	11	11	7	8	11	8	9
(Portugal) João Geraldo	6	11	4	9	1
5	(Germany) Ruwen Filus	11	5	11	11	11
7	(Chinese Taipei) Chen Chien-an	18	8	11	11	7	11
(Singapore) Gao Ning	16	11	8	6	11	7
(Denmark) Zhai Yujia	8	11	8	4	11	11	8
14	(Spain) Alvaro Robles	11	2	11	11	4	7	11
10	(Germany) Ricardo Walther	6	3	3	11	7
(China) Wang Chuqin	11	11	11	8	11
(Austria) Stefan Fegerl	8	8	4	11	6
2	(Chinese Taipei) Chuang Chih-yuan	11	11	11	5	11

Second round
(China) Xu Chenhao	3	8	9	11	11	11	10
(China) Liu Dingshuo	11	11	11	7	9	9	12
13	(Denmark) Jonathan Groth	11	10	11	11	11
5	(Germany) Ruwen Filus	6	12	6	2	9
7	(Chinese Taipei) Chen Chien-an	9	9	5	11	11	11	11
14	(Spain) Alvaro Robles	11	11	11	9	3	8	7
(China) Wang Chuqin	11	11	11	11
2	(Chinese Taipei) Chuang Chih-yuan	9	9	6	8

Quarterfinals
(China) Liu Dingshuo	11	6	11	13	8	9	11
13	(Denmark) Jonathan Groth	6	11	7	11	11	11	2
7	(Chinese Taipei) Chen Chien-an	9	6	5	6
(China) Wang Chuqin	11	11	11	11

Semifinals
(China) Liu Dingshuo	7	11	7	11	13	7
(China) Wang Chuqin	11	8	11	6	15	11

==== Finals ====
Semifinals								Final
1	(China) Fan Zhendong	11	9	11	11	11
4	(Brazil) Hugo Calderano	8	11	7	8	5		1	(China) Fan Zhendong	11	9	11	14	11
(China) Liu Dingshuo		7	11	7	11	13	7		(China) Wang Chuqin	6	11	7	12	3
(China) Wang Chuqin		11	8	11	6	15	11

== Women's singles ==
=== Seeds ===
1. (China) Chen Meng (quarterfinals)
2. (Hong Kong) Lee Ho Ching (quarterfinals)
3. (Hong Kong) Doo Hoi Kem (second round)
4. (Netherlands) Li Jie (quarterfinals)
5. (Chinese Taipei) Chen Szu-yu (semifinals)
6. (China) Wang Manyu (champion)
7. (Hungary) Georgina Póta (first round)
8. (Austria) Sofia Polcanova (quarterfinals)
9. (China) Chen Xingtong (semifinals)
10. (Sweden) Matilda Ekholm (first round)
11. (Singapore) Zeng Jian (second round)
12. (Hong Kong) Soo Wai Yam Minnie (second round)
13. (Canada) Zhang Mo (second round)
14. (Japan) Yui Hamamoto (first round)
15. (Portugal) Yu Fu (second round)
16. (Hungary) Szandra Pergel (first round)

=== Draw ===
==== Top half ====
First round
1	(China) Chen Meng	11	11	11	7	11
(Russia) Olga Vorobeva	6	2	5	11	5
(China) He Zhuojia	11	11	11	11
10	(Sweden) Matilda Ekholm	6	1	9	5
16	(Hungary) Szandra Pergel	5	5	8	9
(Romania) Bernadette Szőcs	11	11	11	11
(Romania) Adina Diaconu	5	6	5	5
6	(China) Wang Manyu	11	11	11	11
8	(Austria) Sofia Polcanova	11	11	11	11	6	8	11
(Poland) Natalia Partyka	8	5	9	13	11	11	6
(Hungary) Dora Madarasz	4	11	11	11	4	7	9
13	(Canada) Zhang Mo	11	5	9	9	11	11	11
9	(China) Chen Xingtong	11	11	11	11
(Poland) Li Qian	3	4	2	9
(Monaco) Yang Xiaoxin	11	7	11	13	8	6	9
3	(Hong Kong) Doo Hoi Kem	8	11	5	11	11	11	11

Second round
1	(China) Chen Meng	11	10	11	4	11	11
(China) He Zhuojia	8	12	2	11	3	2
(Romania) Bernadette Szőcs	3	1	8	9
6	(China) Wang Manyu	11	11	11	11
8	(Austria) Sofia Polcanova	11	12	7	11	13
13	(Canada) Zhang Mo	9	10	11	4	11
9	(China) Chen Xingtong	11	11	14	9	11
3	(Hong Kong) Doo Hoi Kem	4	2	12	11	5

Quarterfinals
1	(China) Chen Meng	8	11	12	11	7
6	(China) Wang Manyu	11	7	14	13	11
8	(Austria) Sofia Polcanova	5	5	8	11	11	9
9	(China) Chen Xingtong	11	11	11	3	5	11

Semifinals
6	(China) Wang Manyu	12	13	11	11	15	9	11
9	(China) Chen Xingtong	14	11	8	13	13	11	5

==== Bottom half ====
First round
4	(Netherlands) Li Jie	11	11	11	11
(Hong Kong) Ng Wing Nam	9	4	6	1
(Italy) Li Xiang	9	8	10	7
12	(Hong Kong) Soo Wai Yam Minnie	11	11	12	11
14	(Japan) Yui Hamamoto	11	10	9	8	11	6
(Russia) Polina Mikhailova	8	12	11	11	7	11
(Ukraine) Ganna Gaponova	6	6	3	9
5	(Chinese Taipei) Chen Szu-yu	11	11	11	11
7	(Hungary) Georgina Póta	6	5	11	1
(China) Sun Yingsha	11	11	13	11
(India) Mouma Das	11	4	3	5	11	9
15	(Portugal) Yu Fu	8	11	11	11	9	11
11	(Singapore) Zeng Jian	11	14	11	10	7	10	11
(Germany) Nina Mittelham	7	12	8	12	11	12	7
(Egypt) Dina Meshref	13	4	9	11	7	7
2	(Hong Kong) Lee Ho Ching	11	11	11	6	11	11

Second round
4	(Netherlands) Li Jie	3	5	11	16	9	11	11
12	(Hong Kong) Soo W. Y. M.	11	11	6	14	11	6	8
(Russia) Polina Mikhailova	8	9	11	9	11	4
5	(Chinese Taipei) Chen Szu-yu	11	11	6	11	8	11
(China) Sun Yingsha	12	11	9	11	11	2	11
15	(Portugal) Yu Fu	10	8	11	13	5	11	4
11	(Singapore) Zeng Jian	6	6	3	7
2	(Hong Kong) Lee Ho Ching	11	11	11	11

Quarterfinals
4	(Netherlands) Li Jie	6	11	7	8	11	9
5	(Chinese Taipei) Chen Szu-yu	11	7	11	11	9	11
(China) Sun Yingsha	11	11	9	11	11
2	(Hong Kong) Lee Ho Ching	6	4	11	8	6

Semifinals
5	(Chinese Taipei) Chen Szu-yu	5	8	5	13	7
(China) Sun Yingsha	11	11	11	11	11

==== Finals ====
Semifinals									Final
6	(China) Wang Manyu	12	13	11	11	15	9	11
9	(China) Chen Xingtong	14	11	8	13	13	11	5	6	(China) Wang Manyu	9	11	10	11	9	11	11
5	(Chinese Taipei) Chen Szu-yu	5	8	5	13	7				(China) Sun Yingsha	11	6	12	8	11	8	4
	(China) Sun Yingsha	11	11	11	11	11

== Men's doubles ==
=== Seeds ===
1. (Germany) Patrick Franziska / (Denmark) Jonathan Groth (semifinals)
2. (Singapore) Gao Ning / Pang Xue Jie (quarterfinals)
3. (Belgium) Robin Devos / Cédric Nuytinck (quarterfinals)
4. (Germany) Ruwen Filus / Ricardo Walther (quarterfinals)
5. (Sweden) Kristian Karlsson / Mattias Karlsson (semifinals)
6. (China) Fan Zhendong / Yu Ziyang (champions)
7. (Hungary) Nandor Ecseki / Adam Szudi (quarterfinals)
8. (India) Sharath Kamal / Sathiyan Gnanasekaran (first round)

=== Draw ===
First round
1	(Germany) Franziska / (Denmark) Groth	12	11	11
(Chinese Taipei) Liao / Lin	10	6	4
(Egypt) Assar / El-Beiali	7	11	8	6
7	(Hungary) Ecseki / Szudi	11	8	11	11
6	(China) Fan / Yu	11	11	11
(Hong Kong) Lam / Ng	8	5	8
(Czech Republic) Konečný / Polansky	7	15	10	11
4	(Germany) Filus / Walther	11	13	12	13
3	(Belgium) Devos / Nuytinck	12	11	11	7	12
(Sweden) Gerell / Källberg	14	7	6	11	10
(Belarus) Platonov / Samsonov	11	7	6	11	11
8	(India) Achanta / Gnanasekaran	3	11	11	8	8
5	(Sweden) Karlsson / Karlsson	11	11	12
(Austria) Gardos / Habesohn	6	8	10
(Denmark) Rasmussen / (Hungary) Szita	9	9	11	6
2	(Singapore) Gao / Pang	11	11	6	11

Quarterfinals
1	(Germany) Franziska / (Denmark) Groth	8	11	12	11
7	(Hungary) Ecseki / Szudi	11	9	10	7
6	(China) Fan / Yu	9	11	11	11
4	(Germany) Filus / Walther	11	4	5	9
3	(Belgium) Devos / Nuytinck	10	9	10
(Belarus) Platonov / Samsonov	12	11	12
5	(Sweden) Karlsson / Karlsson	11	13	7	11
2	(Singapore) Gao / Pang	9	11	11	6

Semifinals
1	(Germany) Franziska / (Denmark) Groth	6	5	7
6	(China) Fan / Yu	11	11	11
(Belarus) Platonov / Samsonov	13	1	11	6	11
5	(Sweden) Karlsson / Karlsson	11	11	8	11	6

Final
6	(China) Fan / Yu	11	11	11
(Belarus) Platonov / Samsonov	5	5	4

== Women's doubles ==
=== Seeds ===
1. (Hong Kong) Doo Hoi Kem / Lee Ho Ching (semifinals)
2. (Sweden) Matilda Ekholm / (Hungary) Georgina Póta (semifinals)
3. (China) Chen Xingtong / Sun Yingsha (champions)
4. (Hong Kong) Ng Wing Nam / Soo Wai Yam Minnie (quarterfinals)
5. (India) Manika Batra / Mouma Das (quarterfinals)
6. (Hungary) Dora Madarasz / Szandra Pergel (first round)
7. (China) Chen Ke / Wang Manyu (final)
8. (Austria) Sofia Polcanova / (Canada) Zhang Mo (quarterfinals)

=== Draw ===
First round
1	(Hong Kong) Doo / Lee	11	3	11	11
(Russia) Mikhailova / (Belarus) Pavlovich	6	11	8	3
(Poland) Grzybowska-Franc / Partyka	11	11	11	11
6	(Hungary) Madarasz / Pergel	13	7	6	8
5	(India) Batra / Das	11	11	11
(Egypt) Helmy / Meshref	8	3	5
(Sweden) Bergström / Jonsson	7	5	11	4
3	(China) Chen / Sun	11	11	9	11
4	(Hong Kong) Ng / Soo	11	11	12
(Czech Republic) Adámková / Kučerová	7	5	10
(Germany) Mittelham / Winter	4	7	7
7	(China) Chen / Wang	11	11	11
8	(Austria) Polcanova / (Canada) Zhang	11	11	11
(Ukraine) Gaponova / Vasylieva	9	2	9
(Russia) Noskova / Tailakova	5	4	8
2	(Sweden) Ekholm / (Hungary) Póta	11	11	11

Quarterfinals
1	(Hong Kong) Doo / Lee	14	11	11
(Poland) Grzybowska-Franc / Partyka	12	6	9
5	(India) Batra / Das	5	6	8
3	(China) Chen / Sun	11	11	11
4	(Hong Kong) Ng / Soo	5	7	4
7	(China) Chen / Wang	11	11	11
8	(Austria) Polcanova / (Canada) Zhang	8	11	5
2	(Sweden) Ekholm / (Hungary) Póta	11	13	11

Semifinals
1	(Hong Kong) Doo / Lee	4	11	5	6
3	(China) Chen / Sun	11	8	11	11
7	(China) Chen / Wang	11	11	11
2	(Sweden) Ekholm / (Hungary) Póta	6	5	2

Final
3	(China) Chen / Sun	14	11	11
7	(China) Chen / Wang	12	8	8
