= 2018 Bulgaria Open (table tennis) =

Tournament details
- Dates: 16–19 August 2018
- Competitors: 32S / 16D
- Total prize money: US$160,000
- Venue: Arena Asarel
- Location: Panagyurishte, Bulgaria

Champions
- Men's singles: (China) Xu Xin
- Women's singles: (China) Ding Ning
- Men's doubles: (China) Ma Long (China) Xu Xin
- Women's doubles: (Japan) Kasumi Ishikawa (Japan) Mima Ito

The 2018 Bulgaria Open was the ninth event of the 2018 ITTF World Tour. The event was organised by the Bulgarian Table Tennis Federation, under the authority of the International Table Tennis Federation (ITTF). It took place from 16–19 August in Panagyurishte, Bulgaria.

== Men's singles ==
=== Seeds ===
1. (Germany) Dimitrij Ovtcharov (second round)
2. (China) Xu Xin (champion)
3. (China) Ma Long (first round)
4. (Japan) Tomokazu Harimoto (semifinals)
5. (Japan) Koki Niwa (quarterfinals)
6. (Chinese Taipei) Chuang Chih-yuan (second round)
7. (Japan) Kenta Matsudaira (final)
8. (Denmark) Jonathan Groth (first round)
9. (Sweden) Mattias Karlsson (second round)
10. (Belarus) Vladimir Samsonov (quarterfinals)
11. (Japan) Jin Ueda (first round)
12. (Japan) Maharu Yoshimura (first round)
13. (France) Emmanuel Lebesson (second round)
14. (Kazakhstan) Kirill Gerassimenko (second round)
15. (Chinese Taipei) Liao Cheng-ting (first round)
16. (Bulgaria) Stanislav Golovanov (first round)

=== Draw ===
==== Top half ====
First round
1	(Germany) Dimitrij Ovtcharov	11	8	11	11	11
(England) Paul Drinkhall	9	11	6	7	8
(China) Zheng Peifeng	11	11	11	11
15	(Chinese Taipei) Liao Cheng-ting	9	7	8	3
14	(Kazakhstan) Kirill Gerassimenko	11	11	12	7	13	6	11
(Russia) Kirill Skachkov	5	9	14	11	11	11	7
(Slovenia) Bojan Tokič	4	7	4	8
7	(Japan) Kenta Matsudaira	11	11	11	11
6	(Chinese Taipei) Chuang Chih-yuan	5	5	11	11	8	11	11
(Slovenia) Darko Jorgić	11	11	7	7	11	6	4
(Chinese Taipei) Lin Yun-ju	4	11	7	11	9	11	7
10	(Belarus) Vladimir Samsonov	11	7	11	8	11	8	11
13	(France) Emmanuel Lebesson	11	10	11	12	11
(Belarus) Aliaksandr Khanin	7	12	5	10	2
(South Korea) Baek Ho-gyun	9	6	7	7
4	(Japan) Tomokazu Harimoto	11	11	11	11

Second round
1	(Germany) Dimitrij Ovtcharov	9	11	7	3	11	6
(China) Zheng Peifeng	11	8	11	11	9	11
14	(Kazakhstan) Kirill Gerassimenko	15	11	8	9	6	10
7	(Japan) Kenta Matsudaira	13	8	11	11	11	12
6	(Chinese Taipei) Chuang Chih-yuan	9	11	9	13	7
10	(Belarus) Vladimir Samsonov	11	9	11	15	11
13	(France) Emmanuel Lebesson	4	5	7	14	5
4	(Japan) Tomokazu Harimoto	11	11	11	12	11

Quarterfinals
(China) Zheng Peifeng	6	11	11	9	12	11	3
7	(Japan) Kenta Matsudaira	11	7	13	11	10	7	11
10	(Belarus) Vladimir Samsonov	4	8	11	11	6	5
4	(Japan) Tomokazu Harimoto	11	11	9	3	11	11

Semifinals
7	(Japan) Kenta Matsudaira	11	11	9	6	11	11
4	(Japan) Tomokazu Harimoto	5	6	11	11	7	6

==== Bottom half ====
First round
3	(China) Ma Long	11	11	12	11	11	11	6
(England) Liam Pitchford	7	9	14	13	7	13	11
(China) Ma Te	11	11	11	7	9	11
12	(Japan) Maharu Yoshimura	9	3	8	11	11	7
11	(Japan) Jin Ueda	11	6	9	10	11	4
(Japan) Masataka Morizono	9	11	11	12	7	11
(Austria) Daniel Habesohn	9	11	13	11	11	5	11
8	(Denmark) Jonathan Groth	11	8	11	13	8	11	8
5	(Japan) Koki Niwa	8	11	11	11	11
(Germany) Qiu Dang	11	5	4	8	7
(Romania) Ovidiu Ionescu	4	10	6	11	3
9	(Sweden) Mattias Karlsson	11	12	11	8	11
16	(Bulgaria) Stanislav Golovanov	6	4	10	6
(Japan) Yuya Oshima	11	11	12	11
(Slovakia) Wang Yang	3	4	1	11	4
2	(China) Xu Xin	11	11	11	8	11

Second round
(England) Liam Pitchford	7	7	7	11	7
(China) Ma Te	11	11	11	8	11
(Japan) Masataka Morizono	14	6	5	11	7	6
(Austria) Daniel Habesohn	12	11	11	7	11	11
5	(Japan) Koki Niwa	6	11	12	11	7	11
9	(Sweden) Mattias Karlsson	11	3	10	9	11	9
(Japan) Yuya Oshima	4	11	7	11	11	8	8
2	(China) Xu Xin	11	9	11	8	6	11	11

Quarterfinals
(China) Ma Te	11	11	11	11
(Austria) Daniel Habesohn	9	3	8	4
5	(Japan) Koki Niwa	1	6	9	7
2	(China) Xu Xin	11	11	11	11

Semifinals
(China) Ma Te	9	8	2	8
2	(China) Xu Xin	11	11	11	11

==== Finals ====
Semifinals								Final
7	(Japan) Kenta Matsudaira	11	11	9	6	11	11
4	(Japan) Tomokazu Harimoto	5	6	11	11	7	6	7	(Japan) Kenta Matsudaira	10	12	8	6	4
	(China) Ma Te	9	8	2	8			2	(China) Xu Xin	12	10	11	11	11
2	(China) Xu Xin	11	11	11	11

== Women's singles ==
=== Seeds ===
1. (Japan) Kasumi Ishikawa (quarterfinals)
2. (Japan) Mima Ito (first round)
3. (Japan) Miu Hirano (quarterfinals)
4. (Japan) Hitomi Sato (semifinals)
5. (Japan) Hina Hayata (first round)
6. (China) Ding Ning (champion)
7. (Japan) Miyu Kato (first round)
8. (Japan) Saki Shibata (second round)
9. (Romania) Elizabeta Samara (first round)
10. (Japan) Honoka Hashimoto (second round)
11. (Sweden) Matilda Ekholm (first round)
12. (Romania) Bernadette Szőcs (second round)
13. (Hungary) Georgina Póta (quarterfinals)
14. (Germany) Han Ying (second round)
15. (Puerto Rico) Adriana Díaz (second round)
16. (Bulgaria) Maria Yovkova (first round)

=== Draw ===
==== Top half ====
First round
1	(Japan) Kasumi Ishikawa	11	11	11	11
(Netherlands) Britt Eerland	8	4	4	6
(Japan) Maki Shiomi	11	7	13	11	6	8
12	(Romania) Bernadette Szőcs	9	11	15	4	11	11
9	(Romania) Elizabeta Samara	11	3	10	10	9
(China) Wen Jia	8	11	12	12	11
(China) Zhang Rui	6	4	13	6
6	(China) Ding Ning	11	11	15	11
7	(Japan) Miyu Kato	11	10	11	5	11	7	9
(China) Liu Gaoyang	4	12	9	11	5	11	11
(Italy) Li Xiang	11	11	11	11
16	(Bulgaria) Maria Yovkova	3	2	2	3
11	(Sweden) Matilda Ekholm	8	7	11	11	8	10
(Germany) Nina Mittelham	11	11	6	8	11	12
(Russia) Polina Mikhailova	7	4	9	7
3	(Japan) Miu Hirano	11	11	11	11

Second round
1	(Japan) Kasumi Ishikawa	8	11	11	11	11
12	(Romania) Bernadette Szőcs	11	7	8	9	1
(China) Wen Jia	6	8	8	12
6	(China) Ding Ning	11	11	11	14
(China) Liu Gaoyang	11	11	11	14	5	11
(Italy) Li Xiang	4	2	3	16	11	9
(Germany) Nina Mittelham	2	2	4	4
3	(Japan) Miu Hirano	11	11	11	11

Quarterfinals
1	(Japan) Kasumi Ishikawa	11	10	11	4	8	7
6	(China) Ding Ning	8	12	7	11	11	11
(China) Liu Gaoyang	11	11	2	11	11
3	(Japan) Miu Hirano	8	9	11	7	4

Semifinals
6	(China) Ding Ning	11	11	10	12	11
(China) Liu Gaoyang	3	4	12	10	4

==== Bottom half ====
First round
4	(Japan) Hitomi Sato	6	12	11	10	11	11
(South Korea) Park Joo-hyun	11	10	8	12	5	8
(Poland) Natalia Partyka	9	7	7	5
10	(Japan) Honoka Hashimoto	11	11	11	11
13	(Hungary) Georgina Póta	11	11	11	2	8	4	11
(South Korea) Kim Ha-yeong	7	8	8	11	11	11	9
(Luxembourg) Sarah De Nutte	6	5	5	7
8	(Japan) Saki Shibata	11	11	11	11
5	(Japan) Hina Hayata	6	7	11	4	3
(China) Liu Xi	11	11	9	11	11
(Chinese Taipei) Lin Chia-hsuan	7	3	4	11	9
14	(Germany) Han Ying	11	11	11	8	11
15	(Puerto Rico) Adriana Díaz	8	16	11	11	11
(Romania) Irina Ciobanu	11	14	6	4	7
(China) Wang Yidi	11	7	11	13	11	11
2	(Japan) Mima Ito	2	11	3	15	6	3

Second round
4	(Japan) Hitomi Sato	11	11	11	11
10	(Japan) Honoka Hashimoto	4	7	4	7
13	(Hungary) Georgina Póta	11	2	11	9	11	12
8	(Japan) Saki Shibata	9	11	8	11	9	10
(China) Liu Xi	11	11	11	9	12
14	(Germany) Han Ying	9	7	8	11	10
15	(Puerto Rico) Adriana Díaz	7	5	7	11	3
(China) Wang Yidi	11	11	11	6	11

Quarterfinals
4	(Japan) Hitomi Sato	11	11	11	11
13	(Hungary) Georgina Póta	9	5	5	7
(China) Liu Xi	9	5	11	11	8	11	6
(China) Wang Yidi	11	11	7	9	11	9	11

Semifinals
4	(Japan) Hitomi Sato	11	11	7	4	10	6
(China) Wang Yidi	7	9	11	11	12	11

==== Finals ====
Semifinals								Final
6	(China) Ding Ning	11	11	10	12	11
	(China) Liu Gaoyang	3	4	12	10	4		6	(China) Ding Ning	11	10	8	11	11	4	11
4	(Japan) Hitomi Sato	11	11	7	4	10	6		(China) Wang Yidi	7	12	11	8	6	11	2
	(China) Wang Yidi	7	9	11	11	12	11

== Men's doubles ==
=== Seeds ===
1. (Japan) Masataka Morizono / Yuya Oshima (final)
2. (China) Ma Long / Xu Xin (champions)
3. (Japan) Koki Niwa / Jin Ueda (quarterfinals)
4. (Hungary) Nándor Ecseki / Ádám Szudi (quarterfinals)
5. (Chinese Taipei) Liao Cheng-ting / Lin Yun-ju (semifinals)
6. (Sweden) Mattias Karlsson / Pär Gerell (first round)
7. (Poland) Marek Badowski / Patryk Zatowka (first round)
8. (Bulgaria) Teodor Alexandrov / Denislav Kodjabashev (first round)

=== Draw ===
First round
1	(Japan) Morizono / Oshima	10	11	11	7	11
(Belgium) Devos / (Finland) Oláh	12	4	8	11	6
(China) Zheng / Zhu	11	8	11	11
7	(Poland) Badowski / Zatowka	7	11	2	7
6	(Sweden) Karlsson / Gerell	7	7	3
(England) Drinkhall / Pitchford	11	11	11
(Belgium) Nuytinck / (France) Robinot	11	9	11	6	7
3	(Japan) Niwa / Ueda	8	11	6	11	11
4	(Hungary) Ecseki / Szudi	11	11	11
(Turkey) Gündüz / Yiğenler	2	5	8
(Belgium) Cnudde / Darcis	6	8	4
5	(Chinese Taipei) Liao / Lin	11	11	11
8	(Bulgaria) Alexandrov / Kodjabashev	8	11	8	7
(Czech Republic) Jančařík / Reitspies	11	8	11	11
(South Korea) Baek / Kim	11	5	5
2	(China) Ma / Xu	13	11	11

Quarterfinals
1	(Japan) Morizono / Oshima	11	13	9	5	11
(China) Zheng / Zhu	6	11	11	11	7
(England) Drinkhall / Pitchford	11	5	11	11
3	(Japan) Niwa / Ueda	3	11	8	6
4	(Hungary) Ecseki / Szudi	11	9	9	12
5	(Chinese Taipei) Liao / Lin	7	11	11	14
(Czech Republic) Jančařík / Reitspies	8	2	9
2	(China) Ma / Xu	11	11	11

Semifinals
1	(Japan) Morizono / Oshima	11	12	8	10	13
(England) Drinkhall / Pitchford	5	10	11	12	11
5	(Chinese Taipei) Liao / Lin	11	5	2	4
2	(China) Ma / Xu	9	11	11	11

Final
1	(Japan) Morizono / Oshima	11	4	8	6
2	(China) Ma / Xu	9	11	11	11

== Women's doubles ==
=== Seeds ===
1. (Japan) Honoka Hashimoto / Hitomi Sato (semifinals)
2. (Japan) Hina Hayata / Miu Hirano (semifinals)
3. (Japan) Kasumi Ishikawa / Mima Ito (champions)
4. (Sweden) Matilda Ekholm / (Hungary) Georgina Póta (first round)
5. (Slovakia) Barbora Balážová / (Czech Republic) Hana Matelová (first round)
6. (Poland) Katarzyna Grzybowska / Natalia Partyka (quarterfinals)
7. (China) Chen Ke / Wang Yidi (quarterfinals)
8. (Bulgaria) Kalina Hristova / Ivet Ilieva (quarterfinals)

=== Draw ===
First round
1	(Japan) Hashimoto / Sato	11	11	11
(South Korea) Lee / Park	7	8	4
(Russia) Shcherbatykh / Tailakova
6	(Poland) Grzybowska / Partyka	w/o
5	(Slovakia) Balážová / (Czech Republic) Matelová	11	6	11	6	6
(China) Liu / Zhang	6	11	8	11	11
(Germany) Mittelham / Winter	13	11	7	11
4	(Sweden) Ekholm / (Hungary) Póta	11	7	11	9
3	(Japan) Ishikawa / Ito	11	9	11	11
(Romania) Samara / Szőcs	7	11	5	8
(Czech Republic) Čechová / (Netherlands) Eerland	3	4	5
7	(China) Chen / Wang	11	11	11
8	(Bulgaria) Hristova / Ilieva	3	11	11	11
(Chinese Taipei) Lin / (Belgium) Lung	11	7	6	6
(Poland) Bajor / Sikorska
2	(Japan) Hayata / Hirano	w/o

Quarterfinals
1	(Japan) Hashimoto / Sato	9	11	11	9	11
6	(Poland) Grzybowska / Partyka	11	9	7	11	8
(China) Liu / Zhang	11	11	11	12
(Germany) Mittelham / Winter	6	13	6	10
3	(Japan) Ishikawa / Ito	11	9	11	6	11
7	(China) Chen / Wang	9	11	2	11	6
8	(Bulgaria) Hristova / Ilieva	6	1	10
2	(Japan) Hayata / Hirano	11	11	12

Semifinals
1	(Japan) Hashimoto / Sato	9	7	7
(China) Liu / Zhang	11	11	11
3	(Japan) Ishikawa / Ito	7	11	7	11	11
2	(Japan) Hayata / Hirano	11	6	11	5	3

Final
(China) Liu / Zhang	12	7	7	6
3	(Japan) Ishikawa / Ito	10	11	11	11
