= 2018 Czech Open (table tennis) =

Tournament details
- Dates: 23–26 August 2018
- Competitors: 32S / 16D
- Total prize money: US$160,000
- Venue: OMEGA Sport Center
- Location: Olomouc, Czech Republic

Champions
- Men's singles: (China) Zheng Peifeng
- Women's singles: (Japan) Kasumi Ishikawa
- Men's doubles: (Germany) Patrick Franziska (Denmark) Jonathan Groth
- Women's doubles: (China) Liu Gaoyang (China) Zhang Rui

The 2018 Czech Open was the tenth event of the 2018 ITTF World Tour. The event was organised by the Czech Table Tennis Association, under the authority of the International Table Tennis Federation (ITTF). It took place from 23 to 26 August in Olomouc, Czech Republic.

== Men's singles ==
=== Seeds ===
1. (Germany) Dimitrij Ovtcharov (quarterfinals)
2. (Japan) Tomokazu Harimoto (semifinals)
3. (Japan) Koki Niwa (first round)
4. (Portugal) Marcos Freitas (final)
5. (Denmark) Jonathan Groth (second round)
6. (Sweden) Mattias Falck (first round)
7. (Germany) Ruwen Filus (first round)
8. (Sweden) Kristian Karlsson (first round)
9. (Germany) Patrick Franziska (quarterfinals)
10. (Belarus) Vladimir Samsonov (second round)
11. (Japan) Maharu Yoshimura (second round)
12. (Ukraine) Kou Lei (first round)
13. (Germany) Bastian Steger (quarterfinals)
14. (Kazakhstan) Kirill Gerassimenko (second round)
15. (Germany) Benedikt Duda (first round)
16. (Czech Republic) Pavel Širůček (first round)

=== Draw ===
==== Top half ====
First round
1	(Germany) Dimitrij Ovtcharov	11	11	11	11
(Japan) Taku Takakiwa	7	8	9	6
(South Korea) Park Gang-hyeon	5	11	11	11	11
12	(Ukraine) Kou Lei	11	6	4	7	5
15	(Germany) Benedikt Duda	8	15	5	11	8	11	8
(China) Zhang Yudong	11	13	11	6	11	7	11
(England) Liam Pitchford	9	11	11	11	11
8	(Sweden) Kristian Karlsson	11	9	3	8	4
7	(Germany) Ruwen Filus	11	10	6	11	4	9
(Germany) Ricardo Walther	5	12	11	8	11	11
(Belgium) Cédric Nuytinck	2	11	2	7	3
13	(Germany) Bastian Steger	11	7	11	11	11
16	(Czech Republic) Pavel Širůček	7	13	11	11	6	6
(China) Zheng Peifeng	11	15	9	11	11
(Japan) Mizuki Oikawa	11	11	5	12	12
3	(Japan) Koki Niwa	9	7	11	10	10

Second round
1	(Germany) Dimitrij Ovtcharov	11	9	11	11	11
(South Korea) Park Gang-hyeon	3	11	5	7	9
(China) Zhang Yudong	7	12	14	11	6	6	3
(England) Liam Pitchford	11	10	12	7	11	11	11
(Germany) Ricardo Walther	11	12	10	8	11	12	6
13	(Germany) Bastian Steger	5	10	12	11	13	10	11
(China) Zheng Peifeng	11	11	5	11	8	8	11
(Japan) Mizuki Oikawa	5	3	11	3	11	11	4

Quarterfinals
1	(Germany) Dimitrij Ovtcharov	11	12	4	7	6
(England) Liam Pitchford	13	10	11	11	11
13	(Germany) Bastian Steger	9	5	11	11	5	4
(China) Zheng Peifeng	11	11	9	7	11	11

Semifinals
(England) Liam Pitchford	8	7	13	5	9
(China) Zheng Peifeng	11	11	11	11	11

==== Bottom half ====
First round
4	(Portugal) Marcos Freitas	11	11	12	11
(Japan) Yuki Hirano	6	7	10	4
(Russia) Viacheslav Burov	11	10	10	4	7
11	(Japan) Maharu Yoshimura	8	12	12	11	11
14	(Kazakhstan) Kirill Gerassimenko	12	11	5	11	11	12	11
(Russia) Kirill Skachkov	14	6	11	13	9	10	7
(Austria) Daniel Habesohn	11	7	3	11	11	6	11
6	(Sweden) Mattias Falck	9	11	11	8	6	11	8
5	(Denmark) Jonathan Groth	11	11	7	7	11	11
(Poland) Jakub Dyjas	2	2	11	11	7	8
(Croatia) Tomislav Pucar	9	11	3	5	8
9	(Germany) Patrick Franziska	11	9	11	11	11
10	(Belarus) Vladimir Samsonov	13	11	11	11	12
(Poland) Marek Badowski	15	5	7	7	10
(Slovenia) Darko Jorgić	9	3	6	4
2	(Japan) Tomokazu Harimoto	11	11	11	11

Second round
4	(Portugal) Marcos Freitas	11	11	11	11
11	(Japan) Maharu Yoshimura	9	6	9	8
14	(Kazakhstan) Kirill Gerassimenko	10	11	11	10	6
(Austria) Daniel Habesohn	12	8	13	12	11
5	(Denmark) Jonathan Groth	9	11	7	3	11	9
9	(Germany) Patrick Franziska	11	6	11	11	9	11
10	(Belarus) Vladimir Samsonov	7	11	6	13	4	11	5
2	(Japan) Tomokazu Harimoto	11	7	11	11	11	8	11

Quarterfinals
4	(Portugal) Marcos Freitas	11	9	11	11	11
(Austria) Daniel Habesohn	6	11	6	6	3
9	(Germany) Patrick Franziska	11	4	11	9	9	8
2	(Japan) Tomokazu Harimoto	2	11	7	11	11	11

Semifinals
4	(Portugal) Marcos Freitas	11	1	11	9	11	5	11
2	(Japan) Tomokazu Harimoto	5	11	8	11	8	11	6

==== Finals ====
Semifinals									Final
(England) Liam Pitchford		8	7	13	5	9
(China) Zheng Peifeng		11	11	11	11	11				(China) Zheng Peifeng	13	6	8	11	11	11
4	(Portugal) Marcos Freitas	11	1	11	9	11	5	11	4	(Portugal) Marcos Freitas	11	11	11	7	8	6
2	(Japan) Tomokazu Harimoto	5	11	8	11	8	11	6

== Women's singles ==
=== Seeds ===
1. (Japan) Kasumi Ishikawa (champion)
2. (Japan) Mima Ito (quarterfinals)
3. (Japan) Miu Hirano (quarterfinals)
4. (Japan) Hitomi Sato (first round)
5. (Japan) Hina Hayata (first round)
6. (Austria) Sofia Polcanova (first round)
7. (Japan) Saki Shibata (semifinals)
8. (Romania) Elizabeta Samara (first round)
9. (Japan) Honoka Hashimoto (second round)
10. (Sweden) Matilda Ekholm (second round)
11. (Poland) Li Qian (second round)
12. (Romania) Bernadette Szőcs (second round)
13. (Hungary) Georgina Póta (first round)
14. (Germany) Han Ying (first round)
15. (Czech Republic) Hana Matelová (first round)
16. (Czech Republic) Dana Čechová (first round)

=== Draw ===
==== Top half ====
First round
1	(Japan) Kasumi Ishikawa	11	11	11	9	6	11
(Germany) Kristin Lang	9	6	4	11	11	7
(Netherlands) Li Jia	4	6	11	7	11	7
9	(Japan) Honoka Hashimoto	11	11	7	11	6	11
10	(Sweden) Matilda Ekholm	11	14	11	11
(Monaco) Yang Xiaoxin	6	12	6	5
(Puerto Rico) Adriana Diaz	11	11	7	8	11	11
6	(Austria) Sofia Polcanova	6	9	11	11	7	7
7	(Japan) Saki Shibata	8	12	9	11	11	6	11
(United States) Wu Yue	11	10	11	7	9	11	9
(Japan) Yumeno Soma	7	6	13	3	11	8
12	(Romania) Bernadette Szőcs	11	11	11	11	9	11
15	(Czech Republic) Hana Matelova	9	11	11	11	11	5	8
(Japan) Miyu Nagasaki	11	13	6	9	7	11	11
(Japan) Mizuki Morizono	7	6	11	10	11	5
3	(Japan) Miu Hirano	11	11	6	12	6	11

Second round
1	(Japan) Kasumi Ishikawa	11	11	7	11	9	11
9	(Japan) Honoka Hashimoto	7	7	11	6	11	4
10	(Sweden) Matilda Ekholm	5	5	4	11	11	11	5
(Puerto Rico) Adriana Diaz	11	11	11	2	3	6	11
7	(Japan) Saki Shibata	11	11	11	11
12	(Romania) Bernadette Szőcs	7	5	8	9
(Japan) Miyu Nagasaki	5	9	10	5
3	(Japan) Miu Hirano	11	11	12	11

Quarterfinals
1	(Japan) Kasumi Ishikawa	12	11	11	11	9	11
(Puerto Rico) Adriana Diaz	14	5	7	6	11	5
7	(Japan) Saki Shibata	11	12	12	7	8	4	11
3	(Japan) Miu Hirano	9	10	10	11	11	11	7

Semifinals
1	(Japan) Kasumi Ishikawa	11	12	11	11	11
7	(Japan) Saki Shibata	7	10	6	13	6

==== Bottom half ====
First round
4	(Japan) Hitomi Sato	7	11	11	8	7	4
(Germany) Sabine Winter	11	8	6	11	11	11
(China) Wang Yidi	6	9	11	11	1	10
11	(Poland) Li Qian	11	11	5	5	11	12
14	(Germany) Han Ying	11	11	10	7	11	6
(China) Sun Mingyang	9	13	12	11	8	11
(China) Wu Yang	11	11	11	12
5	(Japan) Hina Hayata	9	6	9	10
8	(Romania) Elizabeta Samara	6	7	11	4	3
(China) Wen Jia	11	11	9	11	11
(Portugal) Fu Yu	7	3	4	11	9
16	(Czech Republic) Dana Čechová	11	11	11	8	11
13	(Hungary) Georgina Póta	11	14	6	4	7
(China) Liu Gaoyang	8	16	11	11	11
(China) Zhang Rui	5	9	9	11	11	11	9
2	(Japan) Mima Ito	11	11	11	9	7	9

Second round
(Germany) Sabine Winter	11	11	11	11
11	(Poland) Li Qian	9	2	6	8
(China) Sun Mingyang	8	7	3	9
(China) Wu Yang	11	11	11	11
(China) Wen Jia	11	11	11	11
(Portugal) Fu Yu	1	6	9	3
(China) Liu Gaoyang	9	11	8	9	5
2	(Japan) Mima Ito	11	4	11	11	11

Quarterfinals
(Germany) Sabine Winter	3	5	2	13	9
(China) Wu Yang	11	11	11	11	11
(China) Wen Jia	4	11	10	11	7	13	11
2	(Japan) Mima Ito	11	7	12	5	11	11	7

Semifinals
(China) Wu Yang	11	4	6	0	0
(China) Wen Jia	8	11	11	11	11	inj

==== Finals ====
Semifinals								Final
1	(Japan) Kasumi Ishikawa	11	12	11	11	11
	(Japan) Saki Shibata	7	10	6	13	6		1	(Japan) Kasumi Ishikawa	8	11	11	7	11	13
(China) Wu Yang		11	4	6	0	0	inj		(China) Wen Jia	11	8	4	11	6	11
(China) Wen Jia		8	11	11	11	11

== Men's doubles ==
=== Seeds ===
1. (Germany) Patrick Franziska / (Denmark) Jonathan Groth (champions)
2. (Germany) Ruwen Filus / Ricardo Walther (semifinals)
3. (Hungary) Nándor Ecseki / Ádám Szudi (quarterfinals)
4. (Sweden) Mattias Falck / Kristian Karlsson (final)
5. (Japan) Tomokazu Harimoto / Yuto Kizukuri (quarterfinals)
6. (Austria) Robert Gardos / Daniel Habesohn (first round)
7. (Belarus) Pavel Platonov / Vladimir Samsonov (first round)
8. (Czech Republic) Pavel Širůček / Tomáš Tregler (first round)

=== Draw ===
First round
1	(Germany) Franziska / (Denmark) Groth	11	11	11	11
(France) Akkuzu / Seyfried	6	6	13	9
(Belgium) Devos / (Slovakia) Pištej	7	6	11	8
5	(Japan) Harimoto / Kizukuri	11	11	6	11
7	(Belarus) Platonov / Samsonov	9	8	11	11
(Denmark) Lind / (Hungary) Majoros	11	11	7	13
(Russia) Sidorenko / Vlasov	8	7	6
3	(Hungary) Ecseki / Szudi	11	11	11
4	(Sweden) Falck / Karlsson	12	11	11
(Poland) Dyjas / Kotowski	10	3	6
(South Korea) Cho / Kim	13	8	4	11	11
8	(Czech Republic) Širůček / Tregler	11	11	11	5	7
6	(Austria) Gardos / Habesohn	5	11	11	7
(Poland) Badowski / Zatówka	11	13	8	11
(South Korea) Baek / Kim	2	11	11	5
2	(Germany) Filus / Walther	11	5	13	11

Quarterfinals
1	(Germany) Franziska / (Denmark) Groth	8	11	13	11
5	(Japan) Harimoto / Kizukuri	11	8	11	9
(Denmark) Lind / (Hungary) Majoros	11	11	2	11
3	(Hungary) Ecseki / Szudi	4	8	11	8
4	(Sweden) Falck / Karlsson	11	11	11
(South Korea) Cho / Kim	8	4	9
(Poland) Badowski / Zatówka	7	6	9
2	(Germany) Filus / Walther	11	11	11

Semifinals
1	(Germany) Franziska / (Denmark) Groth	11	11	11
(Denmark) Lind / (Hungary) Majoros	7	9	8
4	(Sweden) Falck / Karlsson	11	11	12
2	(Germany) Filus / Walther	7	8	10

Final
1	(Germany) Franziska / (Denmark) Groth	11	9	12	11
4	(Sweden) Falck / Karlsson	5	11	10	7

== Women's doubles ==
=== Seeds ===
1. (Japan) Hina Hayata / Miu Hirano (semifinals)
2. (Japan) Kasumi Ishikawa / Mima Ito (semifinals)
3. (Sweden) Matilda Ekholm / (Hungary) Georgina Póta (first round)
4. (Slovakia) Barbora Balážová / (Czech Republic) Hana Matelová (first round)
5. (Hungary) Dóra Madarász / Szandra Pergel (first round)
6. (Poland) Katarzyna Grzybowska-Franc / Natalia Partyka (first round)
7. (China) Chen Ke / Wang Yidi (quarterfinals)
8. (Romania) Elizabeta Samara / Bernadette Szőcs (quarterfinals)

=== Draw ===
First round
1	(Japan) Hayata / Hirano	12	11	11
(Russia) Noskova / (Austria) Polcanova	10	4	9
(Germany) Solja / Winter	6	11	10	6
7	(China) Chen / Wang	11	6	12	11
6	(Poland) Grzybowska / Partyka	9	11	7	6
(Luxembourg) De Nutte / (Slovenia) Galic	11	8	11	11
(Croatia) Sun / (Singapore) Zeng	6	8	11	11	13
3	(Sweden) Ekholm / (Hungary) Póta	11	11	7	9	11
4	(Slovenia) Balážová / (Czech Republic) Matelová	6	11	6	7
(China) Liu / Zhang	11	7	11	11
(Netherlands) Li / (Poland) Li	11	11	5	11
5	(Hungary) Madarász / Pergel	8	4	11	7
8	(Romania) Samara / Szőcs	11	11	11
(Sweden) Bergand / Bergstrom	8	7	3
(France) Guisnel / Loeuillette	6	12	2
2	(Japan) Ishikawa / Ito	11	14	11

Quarterfinals
1	(Japan) Hayata / Hirano	11	13	7	9	11
7	(China) Chen / Wang	3	11	11	11	5
(Luxembourg) De Nutte / (Slovenia) Galic	11	7	7	15	7
(Croatia) Sun / (Singapore) Zeng	8	11	11	13	11
(China) Liu / Zhang	10	11	11	11
(Netherlands) Li / (Poland) Li	12	3	4	5
8	(Romania) Samara / Szőcs	10	5	3
2	(Japan) Ishikawa / Ito	12	11	11

Semifinals
1	(Japan) Hayata / Hirano	11	11	8	8
(Croatia) Sun / (Singapore) Zeng	13	4	11	11
(China) Liu / Zhang	11	6	6	11	11
2	(Japan) Ishikawa / Ito	8	11	11	5	8

Final
(Croatia) Sun / (Singapore) Zeng	6	11	2
(China) Liu / Zhang	11	13	11
