= 2018 Japan Open (table tennis) =

Tournament details
- Dates: 8–10 June 2018
- Competitors: 32S / 16D
- Total prize money: US$170,000
- Venue: Kitakyushu City General Gymnasium
- Location: Kitakyushu, Japan

Champions
- Men's singles: (Japan) Tomokazu Harimoto
- Women's singles: (Japan) Mima Ito
- Men's doubles: (South Korea) Jung Young-sik (South Korea) Lee Sang-su
- Women's doubles: (China) Gu Yuting (China) Mu Zi
- Mixed doubles: (China) Liang Jingkun (China) Chen Xingtong

The 2018 Japan Open was the sixth event of the 2018 ITTF World Tour. It took place from 8–10 June in Kitakyushu, Japan.

== Men's singles ==
=== Seeds ===
1. (Germany) Timo Boll (semifinals)
2. (China) Ma Long (quarterfinals)
3. (Hong Kong) Wong Chun Ting (first round)
4. (South Korea) Lee Sang-su (semifinals)
5. (Japan) Koki Niwa (first round)
6. (Japan) Tomokazu Harimoto (champion)
7. (France) Simon Gauzy (second round)
8. (Japan) Kenta Matsudaira (quarterfinals)
9. (Chinese Taipei) Chuang Chih-yuan (quarterfinals)
10. (Sweden) Kristian Karlsson (first round)
11. (Denmark) Jonathan Groth (first round)
12. (Sweden) Mattias Karlsson (second round)
13. (Japan) Jin Ueda (quarterfinals)
14. (Japan) Maharu Yoshimura (second round)
15. (South Korea) Jeong Sang-eun (first round)
16. (Japan) Masaki Yoshida (first round)

=== Draw ===
==== Top half ====
First round
1	(Germany) Timo Boll	13	12	11	11
(Japan) Yuta Tanaka	11	10	5	7
(China) Zhou Kai	11	1	8	12	9
12	(Sweden) Mattias Karlsson	5	11	11	14	11
10	(Sweden) Kristian Karlsson	10	11	5	7	12	7
(Germany) Benedikt Duda	12	8	11	11	10	11
(South Korea) Hwang Min-ha	8	9	5	8
8	(Japan) Kenta Matsudaira	11	11	11	11
5	(Japan) Koki Niwa	11	8	2	8	11	7
(Japan) Kazuhiro Yoshimura	9	11	11	11	9	11
(Hong Kong) Ho Kwan Kit	6	7	11	6	8
13	(Japan) Jin Ueda	11	11	7	11	11
11	(Denmark) Jonathan Groth	11	10	6	7	8
(China) Zhang Jike	7	12	11	11	11
(China) Liang Jingkun	8	11	11	11	14	11
3	(Hong Kong) Wong Chun Ting	11	13	8	7	12	3

Second round
1	(Germany) Timo Boll	11	11	11	11
12	(Sweden) Mattias Karlsson	7	6	8	5
(Germany) Benedikt Duda	8	11	9	12	6
8	(Japan) Kenta Matsudaira	11	7	11	14	11
(Japan) Kazuhiro Yoshimura	11	9	11	8	11	6	6
13	(Japan) Jin Ueda	8	11	7	11	5	11	11
(China) Zhang Jike	8	11	2	11	11	2	15
(China) Liang Jingkun	11	9	11	7	3	11	13

Quarterfinals
1	(Germany) Timo Boll	12	13	11	11	11
8	(Japan) Kenta Matsudaira	14	11	3	7	9
13	(Japan) Jin Ueda	11	7	11	11	11	7	7
(China) Zhang Jike	9	11	9	8	13	11	11

Semifinals
1	(Germany) Timo Boll
(China) Zhang Jike	w/o

==== Bottom half ====
First round
4	(South Korea) Lee Sang-su	11	11	13	11	11
(South Korea) Lim Jong-hoon	7	8	11	13	5
(Chinese Taipei) Liao Cheng-ting	9	12	11	11	12	14
16	(Japan) Masaki Yoshida	11	14	7	7	10	12
9	(Chinese Taipei) Chuang Chih-yuan	11	11	11	16
(Spain) Álvaro Robles	3	9	8	14
(South Korea) Jung Young-sik	9	9	11	5	11	11	4
7	(France) Simon Gauzy	11	11	8	11	3	6	11
6	(Japan) Tomokazu Harimoto	11	11	11	11
(South Korea) Jang Woo-jin	9	8	3	6
(China) Zhou Yu	12	11	11	11
15	(South Korea) Jeong Sang-eun	10	5	3	6
14	(Japan) Maharu Yoshimura	12	15	11	3	11
(Portugal) Tiago Apolónia	10	13	9	11	9
(Chinese Taipei) Chiang Hung-chieh	2	6	2	1
2	(China) Ma Long	11	11	11	11

Second round
4	(South Korea) Lee Sang-su	11	11	6	11	9	7	11
(Chinese Taipei) Liao Cheng-ting	8	8	11	6	11	11	6
9	(Chinese Taipei) Chuang Chih-yuan	11	9	7	11	11	11
7	(France) Simon Gauzy	4	11	11	6	5	6
6	(Japan) Tomokazu Harimoto	11	11	12	11
(China) Zhou Yu	8	7	10	7
14	(Japan) Maharu Yoshimura	10	1	4	4
2	(China) Ma Long	12	11	11	11

Quarterfinals
4	(South Korea) Lee Sang-su	11	8	9	3	11	11	11
9	(Chinese Taipei) Chuang Chih-yuan	3	11	11	11	8	5	4
6	(Japan) Tomokazu Harimoto	11	11	11	3	2	11
2	(China) Ma Long	8	9	7	11	11	6

Semifinals
4	(South Korea) Lee Sang-su	5	12	4	5	11	9
6	(Japan) Tomokazu Harimoto	11	10	11	11	5	11

==== Finals ====
Semifinals								Final
1	(Germany) Timo Boll
	(China) Zhang Jike	w/o							(China) Zhang Jike	11	11	9	4	12	7	11
4	(South Korea) Lee Sang-su	5	12	4	5	11	9	6	(Japan) Tomokazu Harimoto	9	8	11	11	10	11	13
6	(Japan) Tomokazu Harimoto	11	10	11	11	5	11

== Women's singles ==
=== Seeds ===
1. (Japan) Kasumi Ishikawa (quarterfinals)
2. (China) Wang Manyu (final)
3. (Japan) Mima Ito (champion)
4. (Japan) Miu Hirano (quarterfinals)
5. (Chinese Taipei) Cheng I-ching (quarterfinals)
6. (China) Chen Xingtong (semifinals)
7. (Singapore) Feng Tianwei (first round)
8. (China) Liu Shiwen (semifinals)
9. (Hong Kong) Doo Hoi Kem (first round)
10. (Japan) Hitomi Sato (second round)
11. (South Korea) Seo Hyo-won (second round)
12. (Japan) Hina Hayata (second round)
13. (Romania) Elizabeta Samara (first round)
14. (Hong Kong) Lee Ho Ching (second round)
15. (Japan) Miyu Kato (second round)
16. (Chinese Taipei) Chen Szu-yu (second round)

=== Draw ===
==== Top half ====
First round
1	(Japan) Kasumi Ishikawa	9	11	11	12	11
(South Korea) Kim Ha-yeong	11	1	7	10	5
(Romania) Bernadette Szőcs	10	6	11	11	12	11
9	(Hong Kong) Doo Hoi Kem	12	11	6	4	10	6
15	(Japan) Miyu Kato	11	11	7	4	5	11	11
(Japan) Miyuu Kihara	9	4	11	11	11	4	8
(Japan) Miyu Nagasaki	6	4	10	11	7
6	(China) Chen Xingtong	11	11	12	9	11
5	(Chinese Taipei) Cheng I-ching	11	9	11	11	11
(Singapore) Lin Ye	7	11	9	8	2
(China) Hu Limei	11	10	9	8	9
10	(Japan) Hitomi Sato	8	12	11	11	11
11	(South Korea) Seo Hyo-won	11	11	15	6	12
(China) Gu Yuting	7	7	13	11	10
(South Korea) Yoo Eun-chong	7	10	6	9
3	(Japan) Mima Ito	11	12	11	11

Second round
1	(Japan) Kasumi Ishikawa	11	11	4	11	11
(Romania) Bernadette Szőcs	6	9	11	1	7
15	(Japan) Miyu Kato	2	7	11	6	8
6	(China) Chen Xingtong	11	11	6	11	11
5	(Chinese Taipei) Cheng I-ching	11	6	12	11	11
10	(Japan) Hitomi Sato	7	11	10	5	8
11	(South Korea) Seo Hyo-won	7	7	2	4
3	(Japan) Mima Ito	11	11	11	11

Quarterfinals
1	(Japan) Kasumi Ishikawa	3	4	12	11	7	9
6	(China) Chen Xingtong	11	11	10	9	11	11
5	(Chinese Taipei) Cheng I-ching	3	7	13	11	3	6
3	(Japan) Mima Ito	11	11	11	8	11	11

Semifinals
6	(China) Chen Xingtong	11	11	11	9	9	7	7
3	(Japan) Mima Ito	8	9	6	11	11	11	11

==== Bottom half ====
First round
4	(Japan) Miu Hirano	11	10	11	11	11
(Portugal) Yu Fu	7	12	7	9	7
(Japan) Minami Ando	11	12	11	11
13	(Romania) Elizabeta Samara	3	10	8	6
16	(Chinese Taipei) Chen Szu-yu	10	11	11	11	11
(Norway) Ma Wenting	12	5	1	8	8
(Netherlands) Britt Eerland	4	5	2	4
8	(China) Liu Shiwen	11	11	11	11
7	(Singapore) Feng Tianwei	11	11	11	3	4	7
(China) Mu Zi	8	9	13	11	11	11
(Singapore) Zhou Yihan	3	14	4	6	5
12	(Japan) Hina Hayata	11	12	11	11	11
14	(Hong Kong) Lee Ho Ching	11	11	11	11
(Japan) Satsuki Odo	5	3	2	7
(Hong Kong) Ng Wing Nam	7	7	6	7
2	(China) Wang Manyu	11	11	11	11

Second round
4	(Japan) Miu Hirano	11	9	11	11	11
(Japan) Minami Ando	9	11	8	8	7
16	(Chinese Taipei) Chen Szu-yu	4	11	7	3	7
8	(China) Liu Shiwen	11	7	11	11	11
(China) Mu Zi	12	6	9	11	11	11
12	(Japan) Hina Hayata	10	11	11	5	8	7
14	(Hong Kong) Lee Ho Ching	6	7	8	11	9
2	(China) Wang Manyu	11	11	11	7	11

Quarterfinals
4	(Japan) Miu Hirano	4	7	3	4
8	(China) Liu Shiwen	11	11	11	11
(China) Mu Zi	5	9	8	8
2	(China) Wang Manyu	11	11	11	11

Semifinals
8	(China) Liu Shiwen	7	11	10	11	6	6
2	(China) Wang Manyu	11	7	12	9	11	11

==== Finals ====
Semifinals									Final
6	(China) Chen Xingtong	11	11	11	9	9	7	7
3	(Japan) Mima Ito	8	9	6	11	11	11	11	3	(Japan) Mima Ito	11	12	8	11	6	12
8	(China) Liu Shiwen	7	11	10	11	6	6		2	(China) Wang Manyu	7	10	11	7	11	10
2	(China) Wang Manyu	11	7	12	9	11	11

== Men's doubles ==
=== Seeds ===
1. (Hong Kong) Ho Kwan Kit / Wong Chun Ting (semifinals)
2. (Japan) Jin Ueda / Maharu Yoshimura (first round)
3. (South Korea) Jung Young-sik / Lee Sang-su (champions)
4. (Japan) Tomokazu Harimoto / Yuto Kizukuri (quarterfinals)
5. (Sweden) Kristian Karlsson / Mattias Karlsson (first round)
6. (Chinese Taipei) Chen Chien-an / Chuang Chih-yuan (quarterfinals)
7. (Hong Kong) Lam Siu Hang / Ng Pak Nam (first round)
8. (South Korea) Jang Woo-jin / Lim Jong-hoon (quarterfinals)

=== Draw ===
First round
1	(Hong Kong) Ho / Wong	11	11	11
(Thailand) Puthikungasern / Verakultawan	1	2	6
(Thailand) Sanglertsilpachai / Tantakool	11	6	2	11
6	(Chinese Taipei) Chen / Chuang	4	11	11	13
8	(South Korea) Jang / Lim	11	11	11
(Thailand) Panagitgun / Pankhaoyoy	4	5	7
(Spain) Robles / (Romania) Szőcs	11	8	8	5
3	(South Korea) Jung / Lee	7	11	11	11
4	(Japan) Harimoto / Kizukuri	8	10	11	11	11
(Sweden) Källberg / (Slovakia) Pištej	11	12	5	6	6
(China) Liang / Zhou	11	11	8	8	11
5	(Sweden) Karlsson / Karlsson	8	5	11	11	6
7	(Hong Kong) Lam / Ng	8	11	6	11	8
(Chinese Taipei) Liao / Lin	11	8	11	6	11
(Germany) Duda / Qiu	11	7	11	5	11
2	(Japan) Ueda / Yoshimura	9	11	9	11	9

Quarterfinals
1	(Hong Kong) Ho / Wong	11	7	9	11	11
6	(Chinese Taipei) Chen / Chuang	3	11	11	6	5
8	(South Korea) Jang / Lim	10	10	8
3	(South Korea) Jung / Lee	12	12	11
4	(Japan) Harimoto / Kizukuri	11	7	6	7
(China) Liang / Zhou	9	11	11	11
(Chinese Taipei) Liao / Lin	5	11	12	11
(Germany) Duda / Qiu	11	7	10	7

Semifinals
1	(Hong Kong) Ho / Wong	8	11	10	11	9
3	(South Korea) Jung / Lee	11	8	12	9	11
(China) Liang / Zhou	11	11	11
(Chinese Taipei) Liao / Lin	5	6	5

Final
3	(South Korea) Jung / Lee	11	5	11	11
(China) Liang / Zhou	6	11	9	5

== Women's doubles ==
=== Seeds ===
1. (Japan) Hina Hayata / Mima Ito (quarterfinals)
2. (Japan) Honoka Hashimoto / Hitomi Sato (first round)
3. (Hong Kong) Doo Hoi Kem / Lee Ho Ching (first round)
4. (South Korea) Jeon Ji-hee / Yang Ha-eun (semifinals)
5. (Hong Kong) Ng Wing Nam / Soo Wai Yam Minnie (quarterfinals)
6. (China) Liu Shiwen / Wang Manyu (final)
7. (Slovakia) Barbora Balážová / (Czech Republic) Hana Matelová (quarterfinals)
8. (Romania) Elizabeta Samara / Bernadette Szőcs (quarterfinals)

=== Draw ===
First round
1	(Japan) Hayata / Ito	11	11	11
(South Korea) Choi / Yoo	7	7	7
(Singapore) Lin / Yu	3	6	11	11	8
6	(China) Liu / Wang	11	11	7	9	11
8	(Romania) Samara / Szőcs	11	11	11
(Thailand) Kola / Phomma	4	5	8
(Romania) Diaconu / Dragoman	8	4	7
4	(South Korea) Jeon / Yang	11	11	11
3	(Hong Kong) Doo / Lee	4	14	11	8
(Chinese Taipei) Cheng / Liu	11	16	9	11
(Japan) Kihara / Nagasaki	11	9	8	8
5	(Hong Kong) Ng / Soo	9	11	11	11
7	(Slovakia) Balážová / (Czech Republic) Matelová	2	11	11	11
(England) Ho / (Norway) Ma	11	4	4	7
(China) Gu / Mu	11	11	11
2	(Japan) Hashimoto / Sato	8	9	7

Quarterfinals
1	(Japan) Hayata / Ito	11	11	11	9	9
6	(China) Liu / Wang	5	13	9	11	11
8	(Romania) Samara / Szőcs	6	11	11	3
4	(South Korea) Jeon / Yang	11	7	13	11
(Chinese Taipei) Cheng / Liu	11	8	11	11	11
5	(Hong Kong) Ng / Soo	4	11	13	9	5
7	(Slovakia) Balážová / (Czech Republic) Matelová	12	2	15	2	7
(China) Gu / Mu	10	11	13	11	11

Semifinals
6	(China) Liu / Wang	11	6	11	11
4	(South Korea) Jeon / Yang	6	11	7	5
(Chinese Taipei) Cheng / Liu	4	4	11	4
(China) Gu / Mu	11	11	6	11

Final
6	(China) Liu / Wang
(China) Gu / Mu	w/o

== Mixed doubles ==
=== Seeds ===
1. (Japan) Maharu Yoshimura / Kasumi Ishikawa (final)
2. (Hong Kong) Wong Chun Ting / Doo Hoi Kem (quarterfinals)
3. (Chinese Taipei) Chen Chien-an / Cheng I-ching (quarterfinals)
4. (Hong Kong) Ho Kwan Kit / Lee Ho Ching (semifinals)
5. (Sweden) Mattias Karlsson / Matilda Ekholm (first round)
6. (South Korea) Jang Woo-jin / Jeon Ji-hee (quarterfinals)
7. (South Korea) Lee Sang-su / Choi Hyo-joo (semifinals)
8. (China) Liang Jingkun / Chen Xingtong (champions)

=== Draw ===
First round
1	(Japan) Yoshimura / Ishikawa	11	11	11
(Chinese Taipei) Chuang / Chen	5	3	7
(Singapore) Gao / Yu	11	9	3	11	12
6	(South Korea) Jang / Jeon	4	11	11	7	14
7	(South Korea) Lee / Choi	8	11	11	12	11
(Slovakia) Pištej / Balážová	11	13	8	10	8
(China) Yu / Wang	11	10	9	11	10
3	(Chinese Taipei) Chen / Cheng	9	12	11	8	12
4	(Hong Kong) Ho / Lee	9	6	11	11	11
(Thailand) Tanviriyavechakul / Sawettabut	11	11	8	9	8
(Japan) Harimoto / Hirano	11	11	11
5	(Sweden) Karlsson / Ekholm	7	6	6
8	(China) Liang / Chen	11	11	10	11
(Spain) Robles / Dvorak	7	6	12	3
(Romania) Szőcs / Szőcs	13	3	13
2	(Hong Kong) Wong / Doo	15	11	15

Quarterfinals
1	(Japan) Yoshimura / Ishikawa	11	3	11	11
6	(South Korea) Jang / Jeon	1	11	7	6
7	(South Korea) Lee / Choi	11	11	7	11
3	(Chinese Taipei) Chen / Cheng	9	3	11	8
4	(Hong Kong) Ho / Lee	15	11	11
(Japan) Harimoto / Hirano	13	5	8
8	(China) Liang / Chen	11	10	11	8	11
2	(Hong Kong) Wong / Doo	6	12	9	11	9

Semifinals
1	(Japan) Yoshimura / Ishikawa	11	11	11
7	(South Korea) Lee / Choi	6	6	5
4	(Hong Kong) Ho / Lee	11	9	6	7
8	(China) Liang / Chen	7	11	11	11

Final
1	(Japan) Yoshimura / Ishikawa	9	9	9
8	(China) Liang / Chen	11	11	11
