= 2018 Hong Kong Open (table tennis) =

Tournament details
- Dates: 24–27 May 2018
- Edition: 1st
- Competitors: 32S / 16D
- Total prize money: US$145,000
- Venue: Queen Elizabeth Stadium
- Location: Hong Kong

Champions
- Men's singles: (Japan) Kazuhiro Yoshimura
- Women's singles: (China) Wang Manyu
- Men's doubles: (Hong Kong) Ho Kwan Kit (Hong Kong) Wong Chun Ting
- Women's doubles: (China) Chen Xingtong (China) Sun Yingsha

The 2018 Hong Kong Open was the fourth event of the 2018 International Table Tennis Federation World Tour. It was the first staging of the event, and took place from 24–27 May at the Queen Elizabeth Stadium in Hong Kong.

== Men's singles ==
=== Seeds ===
1. (Hong Kong) Wong Chun Ting (second round)
2. (South Korea) Lee Sang-su (quarterfinals)
3. (Japan) Kenta Matsudaira (first round)
4. (Portugal) Marcos Freitas (quarterfinals)
5. (Chinese Taipei) Chuang Chih-yuan (first round)
6. (Egypt) Omar Assar (second round)
7. (Denmark) Jonathan Groth (first round)
8. (Germany) Ruwen Filus (second round)
9. (Japan) Maharu Yoshimura (quarterfinals)
10. (Germany) Bastian Steger (first round)
11. (Germany) Patrick Franziska (second round)
12. (Japan) Jin Ueda (second round)
13. (Nigeria) Quadri Aruna (second round)
14. (South Korea) Jeong Sang-eun (first round)
15. (France) Emmanuel Lebesson (first round)
16. (Japan) Yuya Oshima (first round)

=== Draw ===
==== Top half ====
First round
1	(Hong Kong) Wong Chun Ting	11	13	14	12
(Austria) Daniel Habesohn	7	11	12	10
(Sweden) Jon Persson	11	11	11	11
15	(France) Emmanuel Lebesson	8	3	4	9
11	(Germany) Patrick Franziska	8	12	11	11	9	11	11
(Hong Kong) Jiang Tianyi	11	14	4	9	11	8	7
(China) Zhou Qihao	11	12	11	12
7	(Denmark) Jonathan Groth	8	10	4	10
6	(Egypt) Omar Assar	11	11	11	9	12
(Singapore) Gao Ning	7	9	9	11	10
(China) Zhang Jike	9	11	11	15	11	8	9
9	(Japan) Maharu Yoshimura	11	8	13	13	6	11	11
10	(Germany) Bastian Steger	11	6	11	8	12	4
(South Korea) Cho Seung-min	7	11	13	11	10	11
(South Korea) Jang Woo-jin	11	11	11	11
3	(Japan) Kenta Matsudaira	6	8	7	7

Second round
1	(Hong Kong) Wong Chun Ting	11	11	5	9	9	10
(Sweden) Jon Persson	6	5	11	11	11	12
11	(Germany) Patrick Franziska	10	15	9	8	10
(China) Zhou Qihao	12	13	11	11	12
6	(Egypt) Omar Assar	3	9	6	7
9	(Japan) Maharu Yoshimura	11	11	11	11
(South Korea) Cho Seung-min	13	11	14	9	11
(South Korea) Jang Woo-jin	11	9	12	11	9

Quarterfinals
(Sweden) Jon Persson	13	9	7	11	2
(China) Zhou Qihao	15	11	11	9	11
9	(Japan) Maharu Yoshimura	7	7	1	11	12	11	5
(South Korea) Cho Seung-min	11	11	11	9	10	6	11

Semifinals
(China) Zhou Qihao	9	11	4	9	11	9
(South Korea) Cho Seung-min	11	3	11	11	6	11

==== Bottom half ====
First round
4	(Portugal) Marcos Freitas	11	4	11	11	15
(Germany) Benedikt Duda	8	11	5	8	13
(Japan) Yukiya Uda	11	5	8	11	8	11	3
13	(Nigeria) Quadri Aruna	9	11	11	6	11	9	11
14	(South Korea) Jeong Sang-eun	8	8	11	4	10
(South Korea) Lim Jong-hoon	11	11	5	11	12
(South Korea) Kim Dong-hyun	14	8	9	12	11	11
5	(Chinese Taipei) Chuang Chih-yuan	12	11	11	10	7	6
8	(Germany) Ruwen Filus	11	12	12	11
(India) Sathiyan Gnanasekaran	8	10	10	7
(Japan) Kazuhiro Yoshimura	11	11	12	9	16
16	(Japan) Yuya Oshima	4	7	10	11	14
12	(Japan) Jin Ueda	12	7	8	8	11	11	13
(Japan) Masaki Yoshida	10	11	11	11	9	5	11
(China) Zhu Linfeng	11	4	11	12	11	13	5
2	(South Korea) Lee Sang-su	4	11	13	10	7	15	11

Second round
4	(Portugal) Marcos Freitas	13	9	11	13	10	11
13	(Nigeria) Quadri Aruna	11	11	7	11	12	6
(South Korea) Lim Jong-hoon	8	12	11	11	13	8	11
(South Korea) Kim Dong-hyun	11	14	4	8	11	11	7
8	(Germany) Ruwen Filus	7	2	12	11	7
(Japan) Kazuhiro Yoshimura	11	11	14	8	11
12	(Japan) Jin Ueda	8	7	11	7	7
2	(South Korea) Lee Sang-su	11	11	9	11	11

Quarterfinals
4	(Portugal) Marcos Freitas	9	3	12	8	11	9
(South Korea) Lim Jong-hoon	11	11	10	11	7	11
(Japan) Kazuhiro Yoshimura	20	11	11	11
2	(South Korea) Lee Sang-su	18	6	9	9

Semifinals
(South Korea) Lim Jong-hoon	5	11	6	11	12	12	10
(Japan) Kazuhiro Yoshimura	11	9	11	7	14	10	12

==== Finals ====
Semifinals								Final
(China) Zhou Qihao	9	11	4	9	11	9
(South Korea) Cho Seung-min	11	3	11	11	6	11		(South Korea) Cho Seung-min	5	11	8	3	7
(South Korea) Lim Jong-hoon	5	11	6	11	12	12	10	(Japan) Kazuhiro Yoshimura	11	5	11	11	11
(Japan) Kazuhiro Yoshimura	11	9	11	7	14	10	12

== Women's singles ==
=== Seeds ===
1. (Japan) Kasumi Ishikawa (first round)
2. (Singapore) Feng Tianwei (second round)
3. (China) Wang Manyu (champion)
4. (Japan) Miu Hirano (second round)
5. (Japan) Mima Ito (semifinals)
6. (China) Chen Xingtong (final)
7. (China) Liu Shiwen (quarterfinals)
8. (South Korea) Seo Hyo-won (quarterfinals)
9. (Japan) Hitomi Sato (first round)
10. (Chinese Taipei) Chen Szu-yu (second round)
11. (China) Sun Yingsha (second round)
12. (Hong Kong) Lee Ho Ching (second round)
13. (Hong Kong) Doo Hoi Kem (first round)
14. (Japan) Hina Hayata (first round)
15. (Japan) Miyu Kato (first round)
16. (Austria) Sofia Polcanova (second round)

=== Draw ===
==== Top half ====
First round
1	(Japan) Kasumi Ishikawa	6	5	9	6
(South Korea) Lee Eun-hye	11	11	11	11
(China) Chen Ke	11	11	10	11	9	11
15	(Japan) Miyu Kato	2	6	12	9	11	8
12	(Hong Kong) Lee Ho Ching	11	11	12	11
(Canada) Zhang Mo	6	3	10	4
(Japan) Honoka Hashimoto	6	12	7	13	3
5	(Japan) Mima Ito	11	10	11	15	11
8	(South Korea) Seo Hyo-won	2	11	11	11	10	11
(Romania) Elizabeta Samara	11	6	9	8	12	4
(China) Wang Yidi	11	11	11	11
9	(Japan) Hitomi Sato	5	9	7	7
16	(Austria) Sofia Polcanova	11	9	6	11	11	13
(Japan) Miyuu Kihara	8	11	11	9	9	11
(China) Gu Yuting	9	11	6	8	9
3	(China) Wang Manyu	11	9	11	11	11

Second round
(South Korea) Lee Eun-hye	10	12	19	12	5	11
(China) Chen Ke	12	10	17	10	11	7
12	(Hong Kong) Lee Ho Ching	11	4	5	7	12	7
5	(Japan) Mima Ito	5	11	11	11	10	11
8	(South Korea) Seo Hyo-won	11	11	5	11	11	12
(China) Wang Yidi	6	9	11	13	8	10
16	(Austria) Sofia Polcanova	3	4	10	7
3	(China) Wang Manyu	11	11	12	11

Quarterfinals
(South Korea) Lee Eun-hye	10	7	13	11	8	9
5	(Japan) Mima Ito	12	11	11	8	11	11
8	(South Korea) Seo Hyo-won	8	12	1	6	11	3
3	(China) Wang Manyu	11	10	11	11	8	11

Semifinals
5	(Japan) Mima Ito	11	11	9	11	6	5	10
3	(China) Wang Manyu	8	5	11	9	11	11	12

==== Bottom half ====
First round
4	(Japan) Miu Hirano	11	11	11	12
(South Korea) Choi Hyo-joo	9	8	8	10
(China) Zhang Rui	11	11	11	11
14	(Japan) Hina Hayata	5	7	7	5
10	(Chinese Taipei) Chen Szu-yu	11	11	14	11
(South Korea) Yoo Eun-chong	9	9	12	9
(Poland) Li Qian	6	11	8	11	10	9
6	(China) Chen Xingtong	11	7	11	6	12	11
7	(China) Liu Shiwen	11	11	11	11
(South Korea) Lee Zion	6	7	5	6
(Russia) Yulia Prokhorova	8	8	2	4
11	(China) Sun Yingsha	11	11	11	11
13	(Hong Kong) Doo Hoi Kem	6	7	6	11	5
(China) He Zhuojia	11	11	11	5	11
(Japan) Miyu Nagasaki	11	8	6	11	9	11	6
2	(Singapore) Feng Tianwei	7	11	11	6	11	7	11

Second round
4	(Japan) Miu Hirano	9	7	8	13	10
(China) Zhang Rui	11	11	11	11	12
10	(Chinese Taipei) Chen Szu-yu	9	11	5	11	6	9
6	(China) Chen Xingtong	11	9	11	6	11	11
7	(China) Liu Shiwen	11	12	13	11
11	(China) Sun Yingsha	7	10	11	2
(China) He Zhuojia	11	6	11	11	11
2	(Singapore) Feng Tianwei	2	11	5	4	5

Quarterfinals
(China) Zhang Rui	11	11	9	7	7	8
6	(China) Chen Xingtong	8	8	11	11	11	11
7	(China) Liu Shiwen	9	5	11	11	9	11	9
(China) He Zhuojia	11	11	3	5	11	6	11

Semifinals
6	(China) Chen Xingtong	6	11	11	11	11
(China) He Zhuojia	11	3	9	4	7

==== Finals ====
Semifinals									Final
5	(Japan) Mima Ito	11	11	9	11	6	5	10
3	(China) Wang Manyu	8	5	11	9	11	11	12	3	(China) Wang Manyu	12	11	3	11	4	11
6	(China) Chen Xingtong	6	11	11	11	11			6	(China) Chen Xingtong	10	8	11	6	11	9
	(China) He Zhuojia	11	3	9	4	7

== Men's doubles ==
=== Seeds ===
1. (South Korea) Jung Young-sik / Lee Sang-su (quarterfinals)
2. (Japan) Jin Ueda / Maharu Yoshimura (semifinals)
3. (Hong Kong) Ho Kwan Kit / Wong Chun Ting (champions)
4. (Germany) Patrick Franziska / (Denmark) Jonathan Groth (semifinals)
5. (Japan) Masataka Morizono / Yuya Oshima (final)
6. (Germany) Ruwen Filus / Ricardo Walther (first round)
7. (Chinese Taipei) Chen Chien-an / Chuang Chih-yuan (first round)
8. (Hong Kong) Lam Siu Hang / Ng Pak Nam (quarterfinals)

=== Draw ===
First round
1	(South Korea) Jung / Lee	11	9	15	11
(Austria) Gardos / Habesohn	9	11	13	8
(Iran) Alamian / Alamian	4	11	11	9	9
5	(Japan) Morizono / Oshima	11	6	8	11	11
8	(Hong Kong) Lam / Ng	12	11	12	11
(Belgium) Devos / (Finland) Oláh	10	7	14	6
(India) Desai / Shetty	5	9	11	3
4	(Germany) Franziska / (Denmark) Groth	11	11	9	11
3	(Hong Kong) Ho / Wong	11	13	10	11
(China) Zhou / Zhu	6	11	12	8
(Chinese Taipei) Liao / Lin	11	6	11	11
6	(Germany) Filus / Walther	5	11	6	3
7	(Chinese Taipei) Chen / Chuang	11	5	8	8
(Sweden) Gerell / Persson	6	11	11	11
(Ukraine) Kou / (Belgium) Nuytinck	7	6	4
2	(Japan) Ueda / Yoshimura	11	11	11

Quarterfinals
1	(South Korea) Jung / Lee	8	9	11	6
5	(Japan) Morizono / Oshima	11	11	8	11
8	(Hong Kong) Lam / Ng	7	8	11	8
4	(Germany) Franziska / (Denmark) Groth	11	11	5	11
3	(Hong Kong) Ho / Wong	11	11	6	12
(Chinese Taipei) Liao / Lin	8	4	11	10
(Sweden) Gerell / Persson	7	8	7
2	(Japan) Ueda / Yoshimura	11	11	11

Semifinals
5	(Japan) Morizono / Oshima	13	13	6	11
4	(Germany) Franziska / (Denmark) Groth	11	11	11	4
3	(Hong Kong) Ho / Wong	11	5	11	5	11
2	(Japan) Ueda / Yoshimura	8	11	9	11	7

Final
5	(Japan) Morizono / Oshima	6	3	9
3	(Hong Kong) Ho / Wong	11	11	11

== Women's doubles ==
=== Seeds ===
1. (Japan) Hina Hayata / Mima Ito (semifinals)
2. (South Korea) Jeon Ji-hee / Yang Ha-eun (first round)
3. (Hong Kong) Doo Hoi Kem / Lee Ho Ching (semifinals)
4. (China) Chen Xingtong / Sun Yingsha (champions)
5. (China) Chen Ke / Wang Manyu (final)
6. (Hong Kong) Ng Wing Nam / Soo Wai Yam Minnie (quarterfinals)
7. (Russia) Yana Noskova / (Austria) Sofia Polcanova (first round)
8. (Germany) Nina Mittelham / Petrissa Solja (first round)

=== Draw ===
First round
1	(Japan) Hayata / Ito	9	11	11	11
(Monaco) Yang / (Canada) Zhang	11	7	9	8
(Hong Kong) Li / Liu	5	8	13	11	11
8	(Germany) Mittelham / Solja	11	11	11	9	4
6	(Hong Kong) Ng / Soo	11	8	12	11
(Belarus) Arlouskaya / (Russia) Malanina	6	11	10	8
(Russia) Guseva / Prokhorova	6	9	5
4	(China) Chen / Sun	11	11	11
3	(Hong Kong) Doo / Lee	11	9	11	11
(France) Gasnier / Zarif	5	11	4	7
(Singapore) Yu / Zeng	12	11	11
7	(Russia) Noskova / (Austria) Polcanova	10	6	7
5	(China) Chen / Wang	11	11	11
(France) Chasselin / Loeuillette	7	5	5
(Japan) Kihara / Nagasaki	11	10	11	11
2	(South Korea) Jeon / Yang	6	12	9	7

Quarterfinals
1	(Japan) Hayata / Ito	11	11	11
(Hong Kong) Li / Liu	9	8	3
6	(Hong Kong) Ng / Soo	1	13	2	5
4	(China) Chen / Sun	11	11	11	11
3	(Hong Kong) Doo / Lee	11	11	11
(Singapore) Yu / Zeng	9	9	5
5	(China) Chen / Wang	8	11	9	11	12
(Japan) Kihara / Nagasaki	11	7	11	4	10

Semifinals
1	(Japan) Hayata / Ito	4	11	7	10
4	(China) Chen / Sun	11	2	11	12
3	(Hong Kong) Doo / Lee	12	5	12	11	7
5	(China) Chen / Wang	14	11	10	9	11

Final
4	(China) Chen / Sun	11	11	11
5	(China) Chen / Wang	9	8	9
