= 2018 Japan Open =

2018 Japan Open may refer to:

- 2018 Japan Open (table tennis)
- 2018 Japan Open (badminton)
