= 2018 Australian Open (table tennis) =

Tournament details
- Dates: 26–29 July 2018
- Competitors: 32S / 16D
- Total prize money: US$316,000
- Venue: Geelong Arena
- Location: Geelong, Australia

Champions
- Men's singles: (China) Xu Xin
- Women's singles: (China) Liu Shiwen
- Men's doubles: (South Korea) Jung Young-sik (South Korea) Lee Sang-su
- Women's doubles: (Japan) Hina Hayata (Japan) Mima Ito
- Mixed doubles: (South Korea) Lee Sang-su (South Korea) Jeon Ji-hee

The 2018 Australian Open was the eighth event of the 2018 ITTF World Tour. The event was organised by ITTF-Oceania, under the authority of the International Table Tennis Federation (ITTF). It was the fifth of six top-tier Platinum events on the tour, and took place from 26–29 July in Geelong, Australia.

== Men's singles ==
=== Seeds ===
1. (Germany) Dimitrij Ovtcharov (first round)
2. (China) Xu Xin (champion)
3. (South Korea) Lee Sang-su (first round)
4. (Japan) Koki Niwa (first round)
5. (Japan) Tomokazu Harimoto (semifinals)
6. (Brazil) Hugo Calderano (first round)
7. (France) Simon Gauzy (first round)
8. (Japan) Jun Mizutani (first round)
9. (Japan) Kenta Matsudaira (first round)
10. (Chinese Taipei) Chuang Chih-yuan (first round)
11. (Nigeria) Quadri Aruna (second round)
12. (South Korea) Lim Jong-hoon (second round)
13. (Japan) Jin Ueda (second round)
14. (Germany) Patrick Franziska (quarterfinals)
15. (Japan) Masaki Yoshida (first round)
16. (Australia) David Powell (first round)

=== Draw ===
==== Top half ====
First round
1	(Germany) Dimitrij Ovtcharov	7	7	11	11	17	11	3
(China) Yu Ziyang	11	11	6	13	15	6	11
(Japan) Maharu Yoshimura	11	6	8	11	11	11
10	(Chinese Taipei) Chuang Chih-yuan	6	11	11	7	4	9
16	(Australia) David Powell	1	3	6	1
(Chinese Taipei) Lin Yun-ju	11	11	11	11
(China) Liu Dingshuo	11	12	11	6	8	5	11
8	(Japan) Jun Mizutani	4	10	9	11	11	11	9
6	(Brazil) Hugo Calderano	5	7	11	11	10	11	7
(Japan) Yuya Oshima	11	11	6	5	12	8	11
(Germany) Ricardo Walther	11	12	8	7	7	10
11	(Nigeria) Quadri Aruna	6	10	11	11	11	12
12	(South Korea) Lim Jong-hoon	4	8	11	11	11	11
(Spain) Álvaro Robles	11	11	2	9	5	6
(South Korea) Jung Young-sik	12	11	11	11
3	(South Korea) Lee Sang-su	10	3	8	8

Second round
(China) Yu Ziyang	11	9	11	5	11	11
(Japan) Maharu Yoshimura	8	11	6	11	7	7
(Chinese Taipei) Lin Yun-ju	11	11	8	9	8	6
(China) Liu Dingshuo	8	9	11	11	11	11
(Japan) Yuya Oshima	12	11	11	11
11	(Nigeria) Quadri Aruna	10	9	8	4
12	(South Korea) Lim Jong-hoon	3	7	6	10
(South Korea) Jung Young-sik	11	11	11	12

Quarterfinals
(China) Yu Ziyang	9	3	11	8	11	11	8
(China) Liu Dingshuo	11	11	5	11	6	5	11
(Japan) Yuya Oshima	12	9	11	8	11	11
(South Korea) Jung Young-sik	10	11	6	11	9	6

Semifinals
(China) Liu Dingshuo	11	11	11	11
(Japan) Yuya Oshima	6	5	3	8

==== Bottom half ====
First round
4	(Japan) Koki Niwa	7	9	11	11	5	9
(China) Zhou Yu	11	11	8	5	11	11
(India) Sathiyan Gnanasekaran	11	7	11	7	5	11	11
15	(Japan) Masaki Yoshida	8	11	9	11	11	6	8
9	(Japan) Kenta Matsudaira	14	10	9	11	11	8	10
(Japan) Yuki Hirano	12	12	11	9	3	11	12
(Chinese Taipei) Chen Chien-an	11	11	7	6	13	10	9
5	(Japan) Tomokazu Harimoto	9	9	11	11	11	12	11
7	(France) Simon Gauzy	11	7	7	8	11	4
(India) Sharath Kamal	6	11	11	11	7	11
(South Korea) Kim Dong-hyun	6	9	11	8	2
14	(Germany) Patrick Franziska	11	11	8	11	11
13	(Japan) Jin Ueda	13	11	11	11
(Japan) Masataka Morizono	11	9	9	3
(Japan) Taimu Arinobu	8	12	8	11	7	6
2	(China) Xu Xin	11	10	11	9	11	11

Second round
(China) Zhou Yu	11	14	12	11
(India) Sathiyan Gnanasekaran	3	12	10	5
(Japan) Yuki Hirano	8	3	11	5	4
5	(Japan) Tomokazu Harimoto	11	11	6	11	11
(India) Sharath Kamal	14	11	9	3	11	7	8
14	(Germany) Patrick Franziska	12	9	11	11	7	11	11
13	(Japan) Jin Ueda	11	8	3	11	8	1
2	(China) Xu Xin	7	11	11	7	11	11

Quarterfinals
(China) Zhou Yu	11	10	12	9	5	5
5	(Japan) Tomokazu Harimoto	9	12	10	11	11	11
14	(Germany) Patrick Franziska	7	3	9	9
2	(China) Xu Xin	11	11	11	11

Semifinals
5	(Japan) Tomokazu Harimoto	5	8	11	5	11	7
2	(China) Xu Xin	11	11	9	11	9	11

==== Finals ====
Semifinals								Final
(China) Liu Dingshuo		11	11	11	11
(Japan) Yuya Oshima		6	5	3	8				(China) Liu Dingshuo	10	11	10	13	6
5	(Japan) Tomokazu Harimoto	5	8	11	5	11	7	2	(China) Xu Xin	12	4	12	15	11
2	(China) Xu Xin	11	11	9	11	9	11

== Women's singles ==
=== Seeds ===
1. (Japan) Kasumi Ishikawa (semifinals)
2. (China) Liu Shiwen (champion)
3. (Japan) Mima Ito (quarterfinals)
4. (Japan) Miu Hirano (quarterfinals)
5. (Chinese Taipei) Cheng I-ching (first round)
6. (Singapore) Feng Tianwei (second round)
7. (China) Ding Ning (final)
8. (Japan) Hitomi Sato (quarterfinals)
9. (South Korea) Seo Hyo-won (second round)
10. (Japan) Hina Hayata (first round)
11. (China) Gu Yuting (second round)
12. (Japan) Miyu Kato (first round)
13. (Japan) Saki Shibata (second round)
14. (Chinese Taipei) Chen Szu-yu (first round)
15. (South Korea) Jeon Ji-hee (second round)
16. (Australia) Jian Fang Lay (first round)

=== Draw ===
==== Top half ====
First round
1	(Japan) Kasumi Ishikawa	11	7	11	9	11	11
(Japan) Minami Ando	5	11	2	11	7	4
(Slovakia) Barbora Balážová	10	6	7	4
13	(Japan) Saki Shibata	12	11	11	11
15	(South Korea) Jeon Ji-hee	9	9	13	11	11	5	11
(Netherlands) Li Jie	11	11	11	5	6	11	6
(India) Manika Batra	9	2	7	4
8	(Japan) Hitomi Sato	11	11	11	11
7	(China) Ding Ning	11	11	11	11
(Chinese Taipei) Cheng Hsien-tzu	7	6	6	8
(Japan) Yui Hamamoto	11	4	11	3	10	6
9	(South Korea) Seo Hyo-won	8	11	7	11	12	11
12	(Japan) Miyu Kato	11	8	9	11	10	11
(Singapore) Yu Mengyu	8	11	11	7	12	13
(South Korea) Choi Hyo-joo	10	8	9	6
4	(Japan) Miu Hirano	12	11	11	11

Second round
1	(Japan) Kasumi Ishikawa	11	11	11	11	11
13	(Japan) Saki Shibata	9	13	4	7	8
15	(South Korea) Jeon Ji-hee	11	11	7	7	9	7
8	(Japan) Hitomi Sato	9	6	11	11	11	11
7	(China) Ding Ning	11	11	11	12
9	(South Korea) Seo Hyo-won	3	8	7	10
(Singapore) Yu Mengyu	4	8	2	11	14
4	(Japan) Miu Hirano	11	11	11	9	16

Quarterfinals
1	(Japan) Kasumi Ishikawa	11	11	11	8	11
8	(Japan) Hitomi Sato	4	6	8	11	6
7	(China) Ding Ning	11	11	11	11
4	(Japan) Miu Hirano	6	6	2	8

Semifinals
1	(Japan) Kasumi Ishikawa	8	7	7	8
7	(China) Ding Ning	11	11	11	11

==== Bottom half ====
First round
3	(Japan) Mima Ito	13	10	11	11	3	11
(Singapore) Lin Ye	11	12	7	9	11	4
(Singapore) Zeng Jian	9	11	11	11	12
14	(Chinese Taipei) Chen Szu-yu	11	9	6	6	10
16	(Australia) Jian Fang Lay	4	5	5	6
(China) He Zhuojia	11	11	11	11
(China) Li Jiayi	10	8	11	4	11	8
6	(Singapore) Feng Tianwei	12	11	9	11	9	11
5	(Chinese Taipei) Cheng I-ching	12	11	7	11	6	8
(Thailand) Suthasini Sawettabut	10	6	11	13	11	11
(South Korea) Yang Ha-eun	13	11	9	9	11	12
10	(Japan) Hina Hayata	11	8	11	11	5	10
11	(China) Gu Yuting	11	11	11	11
(Japan) Satsuki Odo	5	5	6	4
(Japan) Marina Matsuzawa	8	8	9	9
2	(China) Liu Shiwen	11	11	11	11

Second round
3	(Japan) Mima Ito	11	11	7	9	11	2	11
(Singapore) Zeng Jian	9	5	11	11	2	11	7
(China) He Zhuojia	11	11	11	13
6	(Singapore) Feng Tianwei	7	6	7	11
(Thailand) Suthasini Sawettabut	11	6	7	9	11	4
(South Korea) Yang Ha-eun	6	11	11	11	6	11
11	(China) Gu Yuting	9	5	7	14	11	3
2	(China) Liu Shiwen	11	11	11	12	9	11

Quarterfinals
3	(Japan) Mima Ito	7	6	3	11	12	10
(China) He Zhuojia	11	11	11	6	10	12
(South Korea) Yang Ha-eun	3	7	6	7
2	(China) Liu Shiwen	11	11	11	11

Semifinals
(China) He Zhuojia	11	5	6	11	6	7
2	(China) Liu Shiwen	7	11	11	5	11	11

==== Finals ====
Semifinals								Final
1	(Japan) Kasumi Ishikawa	8	7	7	8
7	(China) Ding Ning	11	11	11	11			7	(China) Ding Ning	5	7	11	11	11	5	6
	(China) He Zhuojia	11	5	6	11	6	7	2	(China) Liu Shiwen	11	11	3	5	6	11	11
2	(China) Liu Shiwen	7	11	11	5	11	11

== Men's doubles ==
=== Seeds ===
1. (South Korea) Jung Young-sik / Lee Sang-su (champions)
2. (Japan) Masataka Morizono / Yuya Oshima (final)
3. (Germany) Patrick Franziska / Ricardo Walther (quarterfinals)
4. (Japan) Koki Niwa / Jin Ueda (quarterfinals)
5. (Chinese Taipei) Chen Chien-an / Chuang Chih-yuan (quarterfinals)
6. (South Korea) Jang Woo-jin / Lim Jong-hoon (semifinals)
7. (Chinese Taipei) Liao Cheng-ting / Lin Yun-ju (semifinals)
8. (Australia) Benjamin Gould / Kane Townsend (first round)

=== Draw ===
First round
1	(South Korea) Jung / Lee	11	11	11
(India) Desai / Shetty	6	5	4
(India) Kamal / Gnanasekaran	11	11	7	11
8	(Australia) Gould / Townsend	7	6	11	7
7	(Chinese Taipei) Liao / Lin	11	3	9	11	11
(Belgium) Nuytinck / (France) Robinot	9	11	11	4	9
(Brazil) Calderano / (France) Gauzy	4	5	9
3	(Germany) Franziska / Walther	11	11	11
4	(Japan) Niwa / Ueda	11	11	11	11
(Sweden) Källberg / (Slovakia) Pištej	9	9	13	8
(Belgium) Allegro / Lambiet	12	10	9	8
6	(South Korea) Jang / Lim	10	12	11	11
5	(Chinese Taipei) Chen / Chuang	11	7	11	13	11
(Poland) Dyjas / (Spain) Robles	9	11	4	15	7
(India) Anthony / Thakkar	8	3	9
2	(Japan) Morizono / Oshima	11	11	11

Quarterfinals
1	(South Korea) Jung / Lee	11	16	11
(India) Kamal / Gnanasekaran	7	14	4
7	(Chinese Taipei) Liao / Lin	11	11	11	11
3	(Germany) Franziska / Walther	13	8	8	9
4	(Japan) Niwa / Ueda	15	3	9	6
6	(South Korea) Jang / Lim	13	11	11	11
5	(Chinese Taipei) Chen / Chuang	8	10	5
2	(Japan) Morizono / Oshima	11	12	11

Semifinals
1	(South Korea) Jung / Lee	11	11	6	12
7	(Chinese Taipei) Liao / Lin	9	6	11	10
6	(South Korea) Jang / Lim	11	8	9	12	10
2	(Japan) Morizono / Oshima	6	11	11	10	12

Final
1	(South Korea) Jung / Lee	14	11	11
2	(Japan) Morizono / Oshima	12	5	7

== Women's doubles ==
=== Seeds ===
1. (Japan) Hina Hayata / Mima Ito (champions)
2. (Japan) Honoka Hashimoto / Hitomi Sato (final)
3. (South Korea) Jeon Ji-hee / Yang Ha-eun (semifinals)
4. (India) Manika Batra / Mouma Das (quarterfinals)
5. (Japan) Miu Hirano / Miyu Nagasaki (quarterfinals)
6. (Chinese Taipei) Cheng Hsien-tzu / Liu Hsing-yin (quarterfinals)
7. (Slovakia) Barbora Balážová / (Spain) Galia Dvorak (first round)
8. (Australia) Jee Min-hyung / Nie Mingxuan (first round)

=== Draw ===
First round
1	(Japan) Hayata / Ito	w/o
(Singapore) Yu / Zhou
(South Korea) Choi / Shin	11	8	11	9	9
5	(Japan) Hirano / Nagasaki	9	11	4	11	11
7	(Slovakia) Balážová / (Spain) Dvorak	7	8	8
(China) Gu / Li	11	11	11
(India) S. Mukherjee / Sahasrabudhe	7	8	3
3	(South Korea) Jeon / Yang	11	11	11
4	(India) Batra / Das	11	7	11	11
(Australia) Quah / Wu	3	11	5	4
(Singapore) Lin / Zeng	11	13	11
8	(Australia) Jee / Nie	6	11	4
6	(Chinese Taipei) Cheng / Liu	11	9	11	13
(India) A. Mukherjee / Patkar	5	11	6	11
(Ghana) Baah-Danso / Kwabi
2	(Japan) Hashimoto / Sato	w/o

Quarterfinals
1	(Japan) Hayata / Ito	9	11	11	11
5	(Japan) Hirano / Nagasaki	11	7	3	9
(China) Gu / Li	10	11	3	5
3	(South Korea) Jeon / Yang	12	9	11	11
4	(India) Batra / Das	7	6	10
(Singapore) Lin / Zeng	11	11	12
6	(Chinese Taipei) Cheng / Liu	5	2	6
2	(Japan) Hashimoto / Sato	11	11	11

Semifinals
1	(Japan) Hayata / Ito	11	10	8	13	11
3	(South Korea) Jeon / Yang	9	12	11	11	8
(Singapore) Lin / Zeng	6	9	7
2	(Japan) Hashimoto / Sato	11	11	11

Final
1	(Japan) Hayata / Ito	11	11	11
2	(Japan) Hashimoto / Sato	8	9	7

== Mixed doubles ==
=== Seeds ===
1. (South Korea) Lee Sang-su / Jeon Ji-hee (champions)
2. (Japan) Maharu Yoshimura / Kasumi Ishikawa (semifinals)
3. (Chinese Taipei) Chen Chien-an / Cheng I-ching (semifinals)
4. (South Korea) Lim Jong-hoon / Yang Ha-eun (final)
5. (Chinese Taipei) Chuang Chih-yuan / Chen Szu-yu (quarterfinals)
6. (Singapore) Gao Ning / Yu Mengyu (quarterfinals)
7. (Spain) Álvaro Robles / Galia Dvorak (first round)
8. (Australia) Kane Townsend / Parleen Kaur (quarterfinals)

=== Draw ===
First round
1	(South Korea) Lee / Jeon	11	11	11
(India) Anthony / Patkar	9	8	9
(Slovakia) Pištej / Balážová	11	11	11
7	(Spain) Robles / Dvorak	7	4	7
5	(Chinese Taipei) Chuang / Chen	w/o
(Ghana) Abrefa / Kwabi
(China) Zhou / Che	9	8	7
3	(Chinese Taipei) Chen / Cheng	11	11	11
4	(South Korea) Lim / Yang	11	11	11
(New Zealand) Shu / Cheng	3	2	3
(Ghana) Sam / Baah-Danso
8	(Australia) Townsend / Kaur	w/o
6	(Singapore) Gao / Yu	7	11	13	11
(Australia) Gould / Jee	11	8	11	9
(India) Kamal / Batra	11	9	3	7
2	(Japan) Yoshimura / Ishikawa	6	11	11	11

Quarterfinals
1	(South Korea) Lee / Jeon	12	10	11	10	11
(Slovakia) Pištej / Balážová	10	12	7	12	9
5	(Chinese Taipei) Chuang / Chen	10	11	9
3	(Chinese Taipei) Chen / Cheng	12	13	11
4	(South Korea) Lim / Yang	11	11	11
8	(Australia) Townsend / Kaur	4	3	6
6	(Singapore) Gao / Yu	5	9	12	5
2	(Japan) Yoshimura / Ishikawa	11	11	10	11

Semifinals
1	(South Korea) Lee / Jeon	13	11	11
3	(Chinese Taipei) Chen / Cheng	11	9	9
4	(South Korea) Lim / Yang	11	11	11	11
2	(Japan) Yoshimura / Ishikawa	7	9	13	6

Final
1	(South Korea) Lee / Jeon	6	11	5	11	11
4	(South Korea) Lim / Yang	11	7	11	8	8
