= Kazuhiro Yoshimura =

Japanese table tennis player

Personal information
- Born: 28 July 1996 (age 30) Naka District, Ibaraki, Japan
- Height: 175 cm (5 ft 9 in)

Sport
- Sport: Table tennis
- Club: Okayama Rivets
- Playing style: Right-handed shakehand grip
- Highest ranking: 34 (September 2019)
- Current ranking: 130 (2 November 2026)
Medal record
Representing Japan
Universiade
Silver medal – second place	2017 Taipei	Mixed doubles
Silver medal – second place	2017 Taipei	Men's teams
Asian Championships
Bronze medal – third place	2019 Yogyakarta	Men's teams

Kazuhiro Yoshimura (吉村 和弘, Yoshimura Kazuhiro; born 28 July 1996) is a Japanese table tennis player. He is the younger brother of Maharu Yoshimura.

He was the singles winner of the 2018 Hong Kong Open.
