= Matilda Ekholm =

Swedish table tennis player

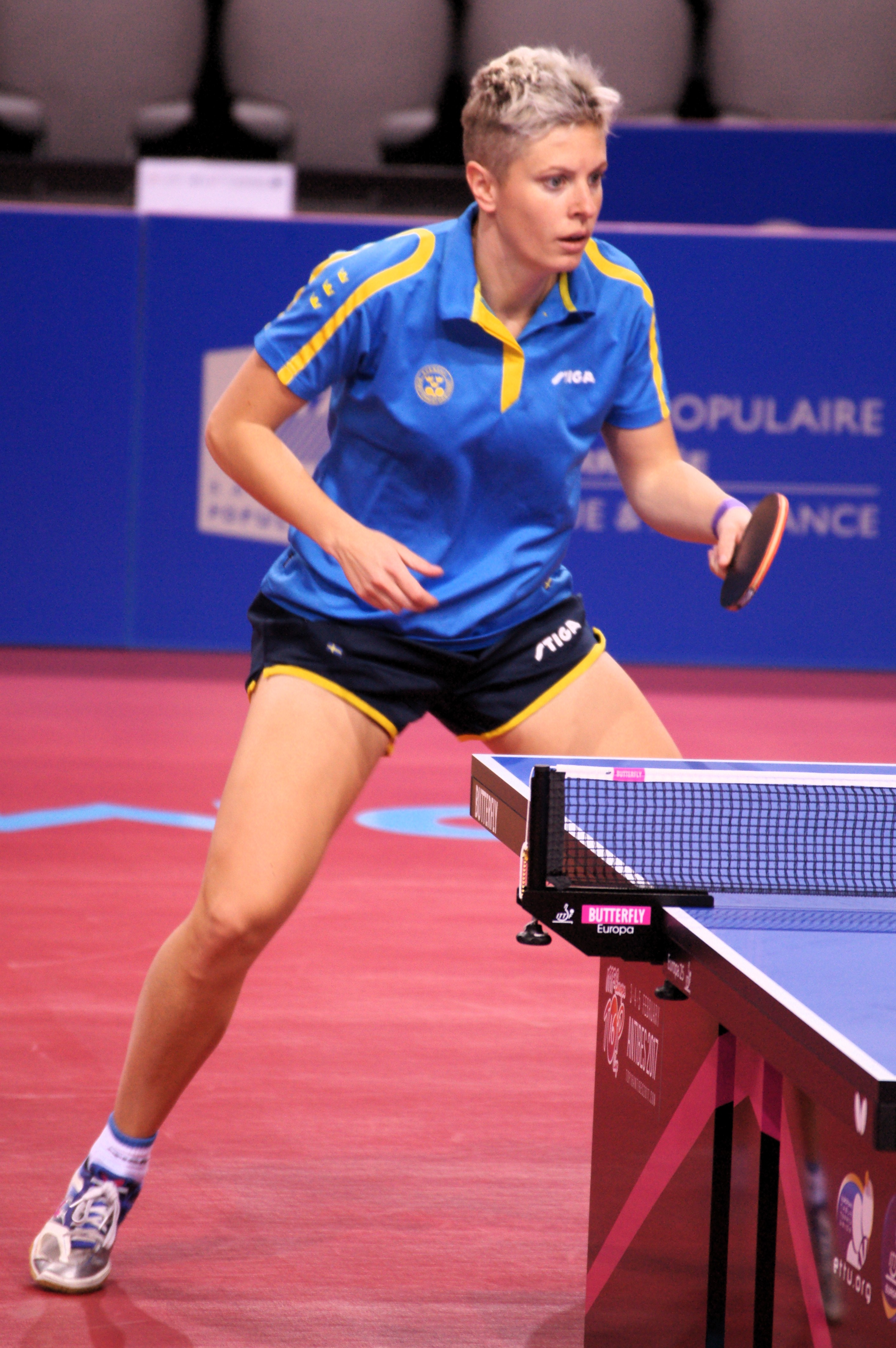
- Matilda Ekholm, Top 16 Antibes 2017

Personal information
- Nationality: Sweden
- Born: 15 June 1982 (age 44) Linköping
- Height: 1.72 m (5 ft 8 in)
- Weight: 68 kg (150 lb; 10.7 st)

Sport
- Sport: Table tennis
- Club: TTC Berlin Eastside
- Highest ranking: 20 (April 2017)
Medal record
Women's table tennis
European Championships
Bronze medal – third place	2018 Alicante	Women's Doubles
Silver medal – second place	2016 Budapest	Mixed doubles
Bronze medal – third place	2013 Schwechat	Women's Doubles
Bronze medal – third place	2014 Lisbon	Team

Matilda Ekholm (Swedish pronunciation: [maˈtɪ̂lːda ˈêːkˌhɔlm]; born 15 June 1982 in Linköping) is a Swedish table tennis player. She has won four medals in European Table Tennis Championships. She won a bronze medal in women's doubles in 2013 paired with the Spanish player Galia Dvorak. She won another bronze medal in women's team in 2014 with the Swedish national team. She won her third medal, a silver, paired with Mattias Karlsson in mixed doubles in 2016. 4th medal was 2018 in doubles with Pota Georgina. She has also participated in women's singles at the 2016 Summer Olympics, finishing 17th.

Ekholm lives in Sweden and plays for TTC Berlin Eastside in Germany.

== Major League Table Tennis ==
In 2023, Ekholm joined Major League Table Tennis (MLTT) for its inaugural season, initially competing for the Florida Crocs. Following her tenure with Florida, she moved to the Los Angeles Spinners for the 2024–2025 and 2025–2026 seasons, where she serves as a primary women's singles player.

During the 2025–2026 season, Ekholm recorded victories against notable opponents including Lily Zhang and Chen Sun. In March 2026, she helped the Spinners in the West Division playoff race, maintaining a position as a core veteran in the team's rotation under coach Romain Lorentz.
