= Yu Ziyang =

Chinese table tennis player

Personal information
- Nationality: Chinese
- Born: 23 May 1998 (age 28) Dongying, Shandong, China

Sport
- Sport: Table tennis
- Playing style: Left-handed, shakehand grip
- Highest ranking: 20 (January 2015)
- Current ranking: 115 (Sep 2019)
Medal record
Representing China
World Cup
| Gold medal – first place | 2018 London | Team |

Yu Ziyang (Chinese: 于子洋; born 23 May 1998) is a male Chinese table tennis player.
