= Chen Ke (table tennis) =

Chinese table tennis player

Personal information
- Nationality: Chinese
- Born: 26 March 1997 (age 29)
Medal record
Women's table tennis
Representing China
Asian Championships
Silver medal – second place	2017 Wuxi	Doubles

Chen Ke (Chinese: 陈可; born 26 March 1997) is a Chinese table tennis player. Her highest career ITTF ranking was 30 in December 2017.
