= 2016 in table tennis =

This page lists the table tennis events for 2016.

- December 30, 2015 – December 18, 2016: 2016 ITTF Events Calendar

== 2016 Summer Olympics (ITTF) ==
- August 6–17: 2016 Summer Olympics in (Brazil) Rio de Janeiro at the Riocentro
  - Men's singles: (gold) (China) Ma Long; (silver) (China) Zhang Jike; (bronze) (Japan) Jun Mizutani
  - Women's singles: (gold) (China) Ding Ning; (silver) (China) Li Xiaoxia; (bronze) (North Korea) Kim Song-i
  - Men's team: (gold) China; (silver) Japan; (bronze) Germany
  - Women's team: (gold) China; (silver) Germany; (bronze) Japan

== Table tennis World Cups & Championships ==
- February 28 – March 6: 2016 World Team Table Tennis Championships in (Malaysia) Kuala Lumpur
  - Men's team winners: China
  - Women's team winners: China
- October 1–3: 2016 Men's World Cup in (Germany) Saarbrücken
  - Winner: (China) Fan Zhendong
- October 7–9: 2016 Women's World Cup in (United States) Philadelphia
  - Winner: (Japan) Miu Hirano
- October 21–29: 2016 ITTF World Cadet Challenge in (China) Shanghai
  - Cadet boys' singles winner: (South Korea) CHO Dae-seong
  - Cadet girls' singles winner: (Japan) Miyuu Kihara
  - Cadet boys' doubles winners: (Austria) Maciej Kolodziejczyk / (Russia) Vladimir Sidorenko
  - Cadet girls' doubles winners: (China) HUANG Yingqi / (South Korea) RYU Han-na
  - Cadet mixed doubles winners: (South Korea) CHO Dae-seong / (United States) Amy Wang
- November 30 – December 7: 2016 World Junior Table Tennis Championships in (South Africa) Cape Town
  - Junior boys' team winners: Japan
  - Junior girls' team winners: Japan

== Continental table tennis championships ==
- February 1–7: 2016 Latin American Table Tennis Championships in San Juan, Puerto Rico
  - Men's singles winner: (Brazil) Hugo Calderano
  - Women's singles winner: (Brazil) Lin Gui
  - Men's U21 singles winner: (Puerto Rico) Brian Afanador
  - Women's U21 singles winner: (Puerto Rico) Adriana Díaz
  - Men's doubles winners: (Argentina) Gaston Alto / Pablo Tabachnik
  - Women's doubles winners: (Venezuela) Gremlis Arvelo / Neridee Nino
  - Mixed doubles winners: (Brazil) Vitor Ishiy / Caroline Kumahara
- February 5–7: 2016 Europe TOP 16 Cup in Gondomar, Portugal
  - Men's singles winner: (Germany) Dimitrij Ovtcharov
  - Women's singles winner: (Spain) Shen Yanfei
- February 14–15: 2016 Africa TOP 16 Cup in (Sudan) Khartoum
  - Men's singles winner: (Nigeria) Quadri Aruna
  - Women's singles winner: (Egypt) Dina Meshref
- March 20–24: 2016 Oceania Table Tennis Championships in (Australia) Bendigo
  - Men's singles winner: (Australia) Chris Yan
  - Women's singles winner: (Australia) Jian Fang Lay
  - Men's doubles winners: (Kiribati) Choy Freddy / (Vanuatu) Yoshua Shing
  - Women's doubles winners: New Zealand (Natalie Paterson, RAO Ruofei)
  - Mixed doubles winners: New Zealand (LIN Yi-Sien, RAO Ruofei)
- April 6–12: 2016 African Junior & Cadet Table Tennis Championships in (Algeria) Algiers
  - Junior boys' singles winner: (Egypt) Youssef Abdel-Aziz
  - Junior girls' singles winner: (Egypt) Amira Yousry
  - Cadet boys' singles winner: (Egypt) Marwan Abdelwahab
  - Cadet girls' singles winner: (Egypt) Rinad Fathy
  - Junior boys' doubles winners: (Egypt) Youssef Abdel-Aziz / Karim Elhakem
  - Junior girls' doubles winners: (Egypt) Mariam Alhodaby / Amira Yousry
  - Junior mixed doubles winners: (Egypt) Youssef Abdel-Aziz / Mariam Alhodaby
- April 9–10: 2016 Oceania Junior Table Tennis Championships in Tweed Heads, New South Wales
  - Boys' junior singles winner: (Australia) Benjamin Gould
  - Girls' junior singles winner: (Australia) Holly Nicholas
  - Boys' cadet singles winner: (New Zealand) Zhao Yanglun
  - Girls' cadet singles winner: (New Zealand) Vong Hui Ling
  - Boys' junior team winners: Australia
  - Girls' junior team winners: Australia
  - Boys' cadet team winners: New Zealand
  - Girls' cadet team winners: Australia
- April 28–30: 2016 Asian Cup Table Tennis Tournament in (United Arab Emirates) Dubai
  - Men's singles winner: (China) Xu Xin
  - Women's singles winner: (China) Liu Shiwen
- June 3–5: 2016 Latin American Cup Table Tennis Tournament in Guatemala City
  - Men's singles winner: (Brazil) Hugo Calderano
  - Women's singles winner: (Colombia) Lady Ruano
- June 13–14: 2016 ITTF-Oceania Cup in (Australia) Melbourne
  - Men's singles winner: (Australia) David Powell
  - Women's singles winner: (Australia) Zhenhua Dederko
- June 24: 2016 North America Cup Table Tennis Tournament in (Canada) Burnaby
  - Men's singles winner: (United States) FENG Yijun
  - Women's singles winner: (United States) WU Yue
- June 25–30: 2016 Pan American Junior Table Tennis Championships in (Canada) Burnaby
  - Boys' junior singles winner: (United States) Kanak Jha
  - Girls' junior singles winner: (Puerto Rico) Adriana Diaz
  - Boys' junior doubles winners: (Argentina) Horacio Cifuentes / Francisco Sanchi
  - Girls' junior doubles winners: (Brazil) Leticia Nakada / Bruna Takahashi
  - Junior mixed doubles winners: (Puerto Rico) Yomar Gonzalez / Adriana Diaz
  - Boys' junior team winners: United States
  - Girls' junior team winners: United States
- July 8–17: 2016 Table Tennis European Youth Championships in (Croatia) Zagreb
  - Junior boys' singles winner: (France) Alexandre Cassin
  - Junior boys' doubles winners: (Germany) Tobias Hippler / Nils Hohmeier
  - Junior girls' singles winner: (Romania) Adina Diaconu
  - Junior girls' doubles winners: (Belgium) Lisa Lung / Eline Loyen
  - Cadet boys' singles winner: (Russia) Vladimir Sidorenko
  - Cadet boys' team winners: (Austria) Maciej Kolodziejczyk / (Moldova) Vladislav Ursu
  - Cadet girls' singles winner: (Russia) Maria Tailakova
  - Cadet girls' team winners: (Romania) Tania Plaian / (Russia) Ekaterina Zironova
- September 10: 2016 North America Table Tennis Team Championships in Milpitas, California
  - Note: The only teams that competed here are Canada and the United States.
  - Men's team: The United States defeated Canada, 3–1, in matches played.
  - Women's team: The United States defeated Canada, 3–2, in matches played.
- September 16–21: 2016 Asian Junior & Cadet Table Tennis Championships in (Thailand) Bangkok
  - Junior boys' singles winner: (China) XU Haidong
  - Junior boys' doubles winners: (North Korea) KIM Song Gun / HAM Yu Song
  - Junior girls' singles winner: (China) QIAN Tianyi
  - Junior girls' doubles winners: (Hong Kong) Minnie Wai-Yam Soo / MAK Tze Wing
  - Junior mixed doubles winners: (China) CAO Wei / SHI Xunyao
  - Cadet boys' singles winner: (China) NIU Guankai
  - Cadet girls' singles winner: (China) SHI Xunyao
- October 7–9: 2016 Europe Youth Top 10 in (Czech Republic) Prague
  - Junior boys' singles winner: (Czech Republic) Tomáš Polansky
  - Junior girls' singles winner: (France) Audrey Zarif
  - Cadet boys' singles winner: (Sweden) Truls Moregard
  - Cadet girls' singles winner: (Russia) Anastasia Kolish
- October 18–23: 2016 European Table Tennis Championships in (Hungary) Budapest
  - Men's singles winner: (France) Emmanuel Lebesson
  - Women's singles winner: (Turkey) Melek Hu
  - Men's doubles winners: (Germany) Patrick Franziska / (Denmark) Jonathan Groth
  - Women's doubles winners: (Germany) Kristin Silbereisen / Sabine Winter
  - Mixed doubles winners: (Portugal) João Monteiro / (Romania) Daniela Dodean
- October 24–30: 2016 African Table Tennis Championships in (Morocco) Agadir
  - Men's singles winner: (Egypt) Omar Assar
  - Women's singles winner: (Nigeria) Olufunke Oshonaike
  - Men's doubles winners: (Nigeria) Quadri Aruna / Segun Toriola
  - Women's doubles winners: (Egypt) Yousra Abdel Razek / Dina Meshref
  - Mixed doubles winners: (Egypt) Omar Assar / Dina Meshref

== 2016 ITTF World Tour ==
- January 20–24: (Hungary) Hungarian Open in Budapest
  - Men's singles: (Chinese Taipei) Chuang Chih-yuan
  - Women's singles: (Hong Kong) Tie Ya Na
  - Men's doubles: (Chinese Taipei) Chuang Chih-yuan / HUANG Sheng-Sheng
  - Women's doubles: (South Korea) JEON Ji-hee / Yang Ha-eun
- January 27–31: (Germany) German Open in Berlin
  - Men's singles: (China) Ma Long
  - Women's singles: (China) Wu Yang
  - Men's doubles: (Japan) Masataka Morizono / Yuya Oshima
  - Women's doubles: (South Korea) JEON Ji-hee / Yang Ha-eun
- February 10–14: Philippines Open in Manila
  - Event cancelled.
- March 16–20: Kuwait Open in Kuwait City
  - Men's singles: (China) Zhang Jike
  - Women's singles: (China) Li Xiaoxia
  - Men's doubles: (China) Xu Xin / Zhang Jike
  - Women's doubles: (China) Ding Ning / Liu Shiwen
- March 23–27: Qatar Open in Doha
  - Men's singles: (China) Ma Long
  - Women's singles: (China) Liu Shiwen
  - Men's doubles: (China) Fan Zhendong / Zhang Jike
  - Women's doubles: (China) Ding Ning / Liu Shiwen
- April 5–9: Chile Open in Santiago
  - Men's singles: (France) Antoine Hachard
  - Women's singles: (Switzerland) Rachel Moret
  - Men's doubles: (France) Antoine Hachard / Romain Ruiz
  - Women's doubles: (Uruguay) Maria Lorenzotti / (Argentina) Candela Molero (default)
- April 20–24: (Poland) Polish Open in Warsaw
  - Men's singles: (Japan) Jun Mizutani
  - Women's singles: (Japan) Miu Hirano
  - Men's doubles: (Japan) Masataka Morizono / Yuya Oshima
  - Women's doubles: (South Korea) JEON Ji-hee / Yang Ha-eun
- May 18–22: Nigeria Open in Lagos
  - Men's singles: (Finland) Benedek Olah
  - Women's singles: (Portugal) Jieni Shao
  - Men's doubles: (Russia) Andrey Bukin / Vasilij Filatov
  - Women's doubles: (Russia) Irina Ermakova / Olga Kulikova
- May 24–28: Croatia Open in Zagreb
  - Men's singles: (South Korea) Joo Sae-hyuk
  - Women's singles: (Japan) Hitomi Satō
  - Men's doubles: (Germany) Patrick Franziska / (Denmark) Jonathan Groth
  - Women's doubles: (Hong Kong) Doo Hoi Kem / LEE Ho Ching
- June 1–5: Slovenia Open in Otočec
  - Men's singles: (Japan) Jun Mizutani
  - Women's singles: (Singapore) Feng Tianwei
  - Men's doubles: (Hong Kong) HO Kwan Kit / Wong Chun Ting
  - Women's doubles: (Russia) Maria Dolgikh / Polina Mikhailova
- June 8–12: (Australia) Australian Open in Melbourne
  - Men's singles: (Japan) Jun Mizutani
  - Women's singles: (Japan) Hina Hayata
  - Men's doubles: (Japan) Takuya Jin / Yuki Morita
  - Women's doubles: (Japan) Honoka Hashimoto / Hitomi Satō
- June 15–19: Japan Open in Tokyo
  - Men's singles: (China) Fan Zhendong
  - Women's singles: (China) Liu Shiwen
  - Men's doubles: (China) Ma Long / Xu Xin
  - Women's doubles: (China) Ding Ning / Li Xiaoxia
- June 22–26: (South Korea) Korea Open in Incheon
  - Men's singles: (China) Xu Xin
  - Women's singles: (China) Ding Ning
  - Men's doubles: (China) Xu Xin / Zhang Jike
  - Women's doubles: (China) Ding Ning / Liu Shiwen
- June 29 – July 3: North Korea Open in Pyongyang
  - Men's singles: (North Korea) KANG Wi Hun
  - Women's singles: (North Korea) KIM Song I
  - Men's doubles: (China) Cao Wei / XU Yingbin
  - Women's doubles: (North Korea) KIM Song I / Ri Myong-sun
- August 24–28: Bulgaria Open in Panagyurishte
  - Men's singles: (Czech Republic) Tomáš Konečný
  - Women's singles: (Japan) Yuka Ishigaki
  - Men's doubles: (Russia) Alexey Liventsov / Mikhail Paikov
  - Women's doubles: (Japan) Miyu Kato / Misaki Morizono
- August 31 – September 4: (Czech Republic) Czech Open in Olomouc
  - Men's singles: (Japan) Yuto Muramatsu
  - Women's singles: (Monaco) YANG Xiaoxin
  - Men's doubles: (South Korea) CHO Eon-rae / PARK Jeong-woo
  - Women's doubles: (Sweden) Matilda Ekholm / (Hungary) Georgina Póta
- September 7–11: Belarus Open in Minsk
  - Men's singles: (South Korea) JANG Woo-jin
  - Women's singles: (Japan) Saki Shibata
  - Men's doubles: (South Korea) JANG Woo-jin / LIM Jong-hoon
  - Women's doubles: (Japan) Honoka Hashimoto / Hitomi Satō
- September 14–18: China Open in Chengdu
  - Men's singles: (China) Fan Zhendong
  - Women's singles: (China) Ding Ning
  - Men's doubles: (China) Ma Long / Zhang Jike
  - Women's doubles: (China) Chen Meng / Zhu Yuling
- September 20–24: Belgium Open in De Haan
  - Men's singles: (India) Sathiyan Gnanasekaran
  - Women's singles: (Hungary) Georgina Póta
  - Men's doubles: (Russia) Alexey Liventsov / Mikhail Paikov
  - Women's doubles: (Hungary) Georgina Póta / (Russia) Yulia Prokhorova
- November 9–13: (Austria) Austrian Open in Linz
  - Men's singles: (Japan) Kenta Matsudaira
  - Women's singles: (Japan) Mima Ito
  - Men's doubles: (Germany) Patrick Franziska / (Denmark) Jonathan Groth
  - Women's doubles: (Japan) Honoka Hashimoto / Hitomi Satō
- November 15–20: (Sweden) Swedish Open in Stockholm
  - Men's singles: (Japan) Yuya Oshima
  - Women's singles: (Japan) Kasumi Ishikawa
  - Men's doubles: (Brazil) Hugo Calderano / Gustavo Tsuboi
  - Women's doubles: (Chinese Taipei) Cheng I-ching / Lee I-Chen
- December 8–11: 2016 ITTF World Tour Grand Finals in (Qatar) Doha
  - Men's singles: (China) Ma Long
  - Women's singles: (China) Zhu Yuling
  - Men's doubles: (South Korea) Jung Young-sik / Lee Sang-su
  - Women's doubles: (Japan) Yui Hamamoto / Hina Hayata
