= 2016 ITTF World Tour =

Details
- Duration: 20 January 2016 – 11 December 2016
- Edition: 21st
- Tournaments: 20 + Grand Finals
- Categories: Super Series (6); Major Series (6); Challenge Series (8); Grand Finals (1)

Achievements (singles)
- Most titles: Men: (China) Ma Long (3, inc. Grand Finals) (Japan) Jun Mizutani (3); Women: (China) Ding Ning (2) (China) Liu Shiwen (2)
- Points leader: Men: (China) Ma Long (2,100); Women: (China) Ding Ning (1,900)

Awards
- Player of the year: Men: (China) Ma Long; Women: (China) Ding Ning

The 2016 ITTF World Tour was the 21st season of the International Table Tennis Federation's professional table tennis world tour. 2016 also marked the tour's 20th anniversary.

The events of the 2016 tour were split into three tiers: Super Series, Major Series and Challenge Series. The Super Series events offered the highest prize money and the most points towards the ITTF World Tour standings, which determined the qualifiers for the 2016 ITTF World Tour Grand Finals in December. The Major Series was the middle tier, with the Challenge Series being the lowest tier.

== Schedule ==
Below is the schedule released by the ITTF:

Super Series
Major Series
Challenge Series
Grand Finals

Tour	Event	Location	Venue	Date		Prize money USD	Ref.
Tour	Event	Location	Venue	Start	Finish	Prize money USD	Ref.
1	(Hungary) Hungarian Open	Budapest	Tüskecsarnok	January 20	January 24	70,000	
2	(Germany) German Open	Berlin	Max-Schmeling-Halle	January 27	January 31	120,000	
3	Kuwait Open	Kuwait City	Salwa Sports Club	March 16	March 20	300,000	
4	Qatar Open	Doha	Ali Bin Hamad al-Attiyah Arena	March 23	March 27	220,000	
5	Chile Open	Santiago	Centro de Entrenamiento Olímpico	April 5	April 9	35,000	
6	(Poland) Polish Open	Warsaw	Torwar Hall	April 20	April 24	70,000	
7	Nigeria Open	Lagos	Sir Molade Okoya-Thomas Sports Hall	May 18	May 22	46,000	
8	Croatia Open	Zagreb	Dom Sportova	May 24	May 28	35,000	
9	Slovenia Open	Otočec	Športni Center Otočec	June 1	June 5	35,000	
10	(Australia) Australian Open	Melbourne	Melbourne Sports and Aquatic Centre	June 8	June 12	35,000	
11	Japan Open	Tokyo	Tokyo Metropolitan Gymnasium	June 15	June 19	120,000	
12	(South Korea) Korea Open	Incheon	Namdong Gymnasium	June 22	June 26	120,000	
13	(North Korea) DPR Korea Open	Pyongyang	Chongchun Street Sports Village	June 29	July 3	35,000	
14	Bulgaria Open	Panagyurishte	Arena Asarel	August 24	August 28	80,000	
15	(Czech Republic) Czech Open	Olomouc	Sportovní hala University Palackého	August 31	September 4	70,000	
16	Belarus Open	Minsk	Palace of Tennis	September 7	September 11	35,000	
17	China Open	Chengdu	Sichuan Provincial Gymnasium	September 14	September 18	220,000	
18	Belgium Open	De Haan	Sport- en recreatiecentrum Haneveld	September 20	September 24	35,000	
19	(Austria) Austrian Open	Linz	TipsArena Linz	November 9	November 13	70,000	
20	(Sweden) Swedish Open	Stockholm	Eriksdalshallen	November 15	November 20	70,000	
21	(Qatar) Grand Finals	Doha	Ali Bin Hamad al-Attiyah Arena	December 8	December 11	500,000	

== Events ==
=== Super Series ===
==== Winners ====
Event	Men's singles	Women's singles	Men's doubles	Women's doubles	U21 Men's singles	U21 Women's singles
(Germany) German Open	(China) Ma Long	(China) Wu Yang	(Japan) Masataka Morizono (Japan) Yuya Oshima	(South Korea) Jeon Ji-hee (South Korea) Yang Ha-eun	(Japan) Yuto Muramatsu	(Japan) Yui Hamamoto
Kuwait Open	(China) Zhang Jike	(China) Li Xiaoxia	(China) Xu Xin (China) Zhang Jike	(China) Ding Ning (China) Liu Shiwen	(Brazil) Hugo Calderano	(Japan) Hina Hayata
Qatar Open	(China) Ma Long	(China) Liu Shiwen	(China) Fan Zhendong (China) Zhang Jike	(China) Ding Ning (China) Liu Shiwen	(Hong Kong) Ho Kwan Kit	(Singapore) Zeng Jian
Japan Open	(China) Fan Zhendong	(China) Liu Shiwen	(China) Ma Long (China) Xu Xin	(China) Ding Ning (China) Li Xiaoxia	(Japan) Tomokazu Harimoto	(Singapore) Zeng Jian
(South Korea) Korea Open	(China) Xu Xin	(China) Ding Ning	(China) Xu Xin (China) Zhang Jike	(China) Ding Ning (China) Liu Shiwen	(South Korea) Lim Jong-hoon	(Japan) Yui Hamamoto
China Open	(China) Fan Zhendong	(China) Ding Ning	(China) Ma Long (China) Zhang Jike	(China) Chen Meng (China) Zhu Yuling	(Hong Kong) Ho Kwan Kit	(Singapore) Zeng Jian

==== Finals ====
German Open

Category	Winners	Runners-up	Score
Men's singles	(China) Ma Long	(Belarus) Vladimir Samsonov	4–1 (11–7, 11–6, 11–4, 10–12, 11–5)
Women's singles	(China) Wu Yang	(Japan) Kasumi Ishikawa	4–1 (11–5, 11–7, 9–11, 11–8, 11–7)
Men's doubles	(Japan) Masataka Morizono / Yuya Oshima	(Hong Kong) Ho Kwan Kit / Tang Peng	3–1 (11–8, 8–11, 11–6, 11–2)
Women's doubles	(South Korea) Jeon Ji-hee / Yang Ha-eun	(Germany) Han Ying / Irene Ivancan	3–1 (11–3, 8–11, 11–7, 11–7)

Kuwait Open

Category	Winners	Runners-up	Score
Men's singles	(China) Zhang Jike	(China) Ma Long	4–1 (11–9, 11–9, 5–11, 12–10, 11–9)
Women's singles	(China) Li Xiaoxia	(China) Ding Ning	4–1 (11–6, 2–11, 11–9, 11–9, 11–8)
Men's doubles	(China) Xu Xin / Zhang Jike	(Hong Kong) Ho Kwan Kit / Tang Peng	3–1 (6–11, 11–9, 11–8, 11–5)
Women's doubles	(China) Ding Ning / Liu Shiwen	(China) Li Xiaoxia / Zhu Yuling	3–0 (11–4, 11–6, 11–5)

Qatar Open

Category	Winners	Runners-up	Score
Men's singles	(China) Ma Long	(China) Fan Zhendong	4–1 (11–9, 11–9, 5–11, 13–11, 11–5)
Women's singles	(China) Liu Shiwen	(China) Ding Ning	4–1 (11–8, 9–11, 11–8, 11–9, 11–9)
Men's doubles	(China) Fan Zhendong / Zhang Jike	(Japan) Koki Niwa / Maharu Yoshimura	3–0 (11–8, 11–9, 11–7)
Women's doubles	(China) Ding Ning / Liu Shiwen	(Japan) Ai Fukuhara / Mima Ito	3–2 (6–11, 11–9, 11–6, 4–11, 11–7)

Japan Open

Category	Winners	Runners-up	Score
Men's singles	(China) Fan Zhendong	(China) Xu Xin	4–1 (11–9, 11–5, 9–11, 11–7, 11–8)
Women's singles	(China) Liu Shiwen	(China) Ding Ning	4–2 (17–19, 11–7, 11–6, 8–11, 12–10, 11–7)
Men's doubles	(China) Ma Long / Xu Xin	(Chinese Taipei) Chuang Chih-yuan / Huang Sheng-sheng	3–0 (11–4, 11–7, 11–4)
Women's doubles	(China) Ding Ning / Li Xiaoxia	(China) Liu Shiwen / Zhu Yuling	3–0 (11–7, 11–7, 11–9)

Korea Open

Category	Winners	Runners-up	Score
Men's singles	(China) Xu Xin	(China) Ma Long	4–3 (11–7, 12–10, 4–11, 12–10, 7–11, 6–11, 11–9)
Women's singles	(China) Ding Ning	(China) Liu Shiwen	4–1 (11–9, 11–13, 11–8, 11–6, 11–6)
Men's doubles	(China) Xu Xin / Zhang Jike	(South Korea) Jung Young-sik / Lee Sang-su	3–0 (12–10, 12–10, 11–8)
Women's doubles	(China) Ding Ning / Liu Shiwen	(South Korea) Jeon Ji-hee / Yang Ha-eun	3–0 (11–9, 11–7, 11–4)

China Open

Category	Winners	Runners-up	Score
Men's singles	(China) Fan Zhendong	(China) Ma Long	4–0 (11–9, 13–11, 11–8, 11–5)
Women's singles	(China) Ding Ning	(China) Liu Shiwen	4–2 (11–6, 8–11, 11–4, 10–12, 12–10, 11–8)
Men's doubles	(China) Ma Long / Zhang Jike	(China) Fan Zhendong / Xu Xin	3–2 (11–8, 5–11, 4–11, 11–9, 11–5)
Women's doubles	(China) Chen Meng / Zhu Yuling	(China) Ding Ning / Liu Shiwen	3–1 (4–11, 11–3, 11–9, 11–5)

=== Major Series ===
==== Winners ====
Event	Men's singles	Women's singles	Men's doubles	Women's doubles	U21 Men's singles	U21 Women's singles
(Hungary) Hungarian Open	(Chinese Taipei) Chuang Chih-yuan	(Hong Kong) Tie Ya Na	(Chinese Taipei) Chuang Chih-yuan (Chinese Taipei) Huang Sheng-sheng	(South Korea) Jeon Ji-hee (South Korea) Yang Ha-eun	(South Korea) Lim Jong-hoon	(Japan) Miyu Kato
(Poland) Polish Open	(Japan) Jun Mizutani	(Japan) Miu Hirano	(Japan) Masataka Morizono (Japan) Yuya Oshima	(South Korea) Jeon Ji-hee (South Korea) Yang Ha-eun	(China) Wang Zhixu	(Japan) Miyu Kato
Bulgaria Open	(Czech Republic) Tomáš Konečný	(Japan) Yuka Ishigaki	(Russia) Alexey Liventsov (Russia) Mikhail Paikov	(Japan) Miyu Kato (Japan) Misaki Morizono	(Chinese Taipei) Liao Cheng-ting	(Japan) Saki Shibata
(Czech Republic) Czech Open	(Japan) Yuto Muramatsu	(Monaco) Yang Xiaoxin	(South Korea) Cho Eon-rae (South Korea) Park Jeong-woo	(Sweden) Matilda Ekholm (Hungary) Georgina Póta	(Japan) Yuto Muramatsu	(South Korea) Yoon Hyo-bin
(Austria) Austrian Open	(Japan) Kenta Matsudaira	(Japan) Mima Ito	(Germany) Patrick Franziska (Denmark) Jonathan Groth	(Japan) Honoka Hashimoto (Japan) Hitomi Sato	(South Korea) Park Gang-hyeon	(Japan) Sakura Mori
(Sweden) Swedish Open	(Japan) Yuya Oshima	(Japan) Kasumi Ishikawa	(Brazil) Hugo Calderano (Brazil) Gustavo Tsuboi	(Chinese Taipei) Cheng I-ching (Chinese Taipei) Lee I-chen	(Japan) Kenta Tazoe	(South Korea) Choi Hyo-joo

=== Challenge Series ===
==== Winners ====
Event	Men's singles	Women's singles	Men's doubles	Women's doubles	U21 Men's singles	U21 Women's singles
Chile Open	(France) Antoine Hachard	(Switzerland) Rachel Moret	(France) Antoine Hachard (France) Romain Ruiz	(Uruguay) Maria Lorenzotti (Argentina) Candela Molero	(Germany) Florian Schreiner	(Cuba) Idalys Lovet
Nigeria Open	(Finland) Benedek Oláh	(Portugal) Shao Jieni	(Russia) Andrey Bukin (Russia) Vasilij Filatov	(Russia) Irina Ermakova (Russia) Olga Kulikova	(Egypt) Shady Magdy	(Romania) Irina Ciobanu
Croatia Open	(South Korea) Joo Sae-hyuk	(Japan) Hitomi Sato	(Germany) Patrick Franziska (Denmark) Jonathan Groth	(Hong Kong) Doo Hoi Kem (Hong Kong) Lee Ho Ching	(Croatia) Tomislav Pucar	(Japan) Mima Ito
Slovenia Open	(Japan) Jun Mizutani	(Singapore) Feng Tianwei	(Hong Kong) Ho Kwan Kit (Hong Kong) Wong Chun Ting	(Russia) Maria Dolgikh (Russia) Polina Mikhailova	(Portugal) João Geraldo	(Japan) Hitomi Sato
(Australia) Australian Open	(Japan) Jun Mizutani	(Japan) Hina Hayata	(Japan) Takuya Jin (Japan) Yuki Morita	(Japan) Honoka Hashimoto (Japan) Hitomi Sato	(Japan) Mizuki Oikawa	(Japan) Miyu Kato
(North Korea) DPR Korea Open	(North Korea) Kang Wi-hun	(North Korea) Kim Song-i	(China) Cao Wei (China) Xu Yingbin	(North Korea) Kim Song-i (North Korea) Ri Myong-sun	(North Korea) Ro Hyon-song	(North Korea) Kim Nam-hae
Belarus Open	(South Korea) Jang Woo-jin	(Japan) Saki Shibata	(South Korea) Jang Woo-jin (South Korea) Lim Jong-hoon	(Japan) Honoka Hashimoto (Japan) Hitomi Sato	(South Korea) Cho Seung-min	(South Korea) Jung Yu-mi
Belgium Open	(India) Sathiyan Gnanasekaran	(Hungary) Georgina Póta	(Russia) Alexey Liventsov (Russia) Mikhail Paikov	(Hungary) Georgina Póta (Russia) Yulia Prokhorova	(Chinese Taipei) Liao Cheng-ting	(Japan) Kyoka Kato

== Standings ==
=== Singles ===
The 15 men and 16 women who played in at least five events and accumulated the largest number of points during the 2016 ITTF World Tour were invited to play in the Grand Finals in December. Qatar's Li Ping was also invited to take part in the men's singles event, to ensure that the host nation was represented.

Men's singles – final standings

Rank	after all 20 events	Events	Points
1	(China) Ma Long	6	2,100
2	(China) Fan Zhendong	5	1,700
3	(China) Xu Xin	5	1,300
4	(China) Zhang Jike	6	1,225
5	(Japan) Jun Mizutani	7	713
6	(Chinese Taipei) Chuang Chih-yuan	8	700
7	(Belarus) Vladimir Samsonov	5	700
8	(Hong Kong) Wong Chun Ting	8	619
9	(Germany) Dimitrij Ovtcharov	5	550
10	(Japan) Kenta Matsudaira	8	401
11	(Japan) Yuto Muramatsu	6	363
12	(Chinese Taipei) Chen Chien-an	10	337
13	(China) Fang Bo	4	300
14	(South Korea) Jung Young-sik	8	288
15	(Japan) Yuya Oshima	8	281
16	(Hong Kong) Tang Peng	5	275
17	(Japan) Koki Niwa	9	254
18	(Portugal) Marcos Freitas	6	250
19	(Czech Republic) Tomáš Konečný	9	234
20	(Croatia) Andrej Gaćina	7	231
21	(South Korea) Lee Sang-su	8	222
22	(Brazil) Hugo Calderano	7	206
23	(Portugal) Tiago Apolónia	8	200
24	(Hong Kong) Ho Kwan Kit	11	200
25	(South Korea) Joo Sae-hyuk	4	200
34	(Qatar) Li Ping	5	134

Women's singles – final standings

Rank	after all 20 events	Events	Points
1	(China) Ding Ning	5	1,900
2	(China) Liu Shiwen	5	1,700
3	(Japan) Kasumi Ishikawa	9	881
4	(China) Zhu Yuling	5	800
5	(Singapore) Feng Tianwei	9	612
6	(China) Li Xiaoxia	2	600
7	(China) Wu Yang	3	600
8	(Hong Kong) Tie Ya Na	6	550
9	(Chinese Taipei) Cheng I-ching	8	538
10	(Japan) Mima Ito	11	525
11	(South Korea) Yang Ha-eun	10	459
12	(Japan) Yuka Ishigaki	13	451
13	(Japan) Miu Hirano	7	450
14	(Germany) Han Ying	7	400
15	(Hong Kong) Lee Ho Ching	11	362
16	(Singapore) Yu Mengyu	8	362
17	(Germany) Shan Xiaona	10	360
18	(Japan) Hina Hayata	11	353
19	(South Korea) Seo Hyo-won	9	338
20	(Japan) Hitomi Sato	15	326
21	(South Korea) Jeon Ji-hee	11	310
22	(Japan) Ai Fukuhara	9	307
23	(Japan) Yui Hamamoto	13	306
24	(Netherlands) Li Jie	4	288
25	(Turkey) Melek Hu	7	225

Player met the qualification criteria and competed in the Grand Finals
Player met the qualification criteria and was invited to compete in the Grand Finals, but withdrew
Player did not qualify for the Grand Finals, either due to not meeting the qualification criteria or not finishing in a high enough position

=== Doubles ===
The eight men's pairs and eight women's pairs who played in at least four events and accumulated the largest number of points, as a pair, during the 2016 ITTF World Tour were invited to play in the Grand Finals in December.

Men's doubles – final standings

Rank	after all 20 events	Events	Points
1	(Japan) Masataka Morizono / (Japan) Yuya Oshima	6	632
2	(China) Xu Xin / (China) Zhang Jike	2	600
3	(South Korea) Jung Young-sik / (South Korea) Lee Sang-su	8	526
4	(Russia) Alexey Liventsov / (Russia) Mikhail Paikov	6	488
5	(Chinese Taipei) Chuang Chih-yuan / (Chinese Taipei) Huang Sheng-sheng	4	426
6	(Germany) Patrick Franziska / (Denmark) Jonathan Groth	4	400
7	(Hong Kong) Ho Kwan Kit / (Hong Kong) Tang Peng	4	376
8	(China) Fan Zhendong / (China) Zhang Jike	2	375
9	(Japan) Koki Niwa / (Japan) Maharu Yoshimura	5	332
10	(Brazil) Hugo Calderano / (Brazil) Gustavo Tsuboi	4	326
11	(China) Ma Long / (China) Xu Xin	2	319
12	(China) Ma Long / (China) Zhang Jike	1	300
13	(Belgium) Robin Devos / (Belgium) Cédric Nuytinck	8	233
14	(Chinese Taipei) Chen Chien-an / (Chinese Taipei) Chiang Hung-chieh	7	221
15	(Hong Kong) Ho Kwan Kit / (Hong Kong) Wong Chun Ting	4	219
16	(South Korea) Cho Eon-rae / (South Korea) Park Jeong-woo	2	206
17	(France) Antoine Hachard / (France) Romain Ruiz	4	188
18	(South Korea) Kim Min-hyeok / (South Korea) Park Gang-hyeon	5	163
19	(China) Fan Zhendong (China) Xu Xin	1	150
20	(China) Fan Zhendong / (China) Ma Long	2	150

Women's doubles – final standings

Rank	after all 20 events	Events	Points
1	(South Korea) Jeon Ji-hee / (South Korea) Yang Ha-eun	9	1082
2	(China) Ding Ning / (China) Liu Shiwen	4	1050
3	(Japan) Honoka Hashimoto / (Japan) Hitomi Sato	11	589
4	(Russia) Maria Dolgikh / (Russia) Polina Mikhailova	7	451
5	(China) Ding Ning / (China) Li Xiaoxia	1	300
6	(China) Chen Meng / (China) Zhu Yuling	1	300
7	(Sweden) Matilda Ekholm / (Hungary) Georgina Póta	3	263
8	(Chinese Taipei) Cheng I-ching / (Chinese Taipei) Huang Yi-hua	6	251
9	(Hong Kong) Doo Hoi Kem / (Hong Kong) Lee Ho Ching	5	226
10	(Chinese Taipei) Cheng I-ching / (Chinese Taipei) Lee I-chen	2	225
11	(Japan) Ai Fukuhara / (Japan) Mima Ito	2	225
12	(Singapore) Yu Mengyu / (Singapore) Zhou Yihan	7	208
13	(Japan) Miyu Kato / (Japan) Misaki Morizono	1	200
14	(Germany) Han Ying / (Germany) Irene Ivancan	2	175
15	(Hong Kong) Jiang Huajun / (Hong Kong) Tie Yana	2	175
16	(Germany) Shan Xiaona / (Germany) Petrissa Solja	5	158
17	(China) Li Xiaoxia / (China) Zhu Yuling	1	150
18	(China) Liu Shiwen / (China) Zhu Yuling	1	150
19	(Japan) Yui Hamamoto (Japan) Hina Hayata	4	145
20	(Netherlands) Li Jie / (Poland) Li Qian	2	138
23	(Hungary) Dóra Madarász (Hungary) Szandra Pergel	6	120

Pair met the qualification criteria and competed in the Grand Finals
Pair met the qualification criteria and was invited to compete in the Grand Finals, but withdrew
Pair did not qualify for the Grand Finals, either due to not meeting the qualification criteria, not finishing in a high enough position, or due to the fact that one player in the pair had already qualified in a higher position with another partner

== Grand Finals ==
The 2016 ITTF World Tour Grand Finals took place from 8–11 December at the Ali Bin Hamad al-Attiyah Arena in Doha, Qatar.

== ITTF Star Awards ==
The 2016 ITTF Star Awards ceremony was held on the first evening of the Grand Finals at the Sheraton Grand Doha on 8 December.

Awards were handed out in eight categories:

- Male Table Tennis Star: (China) Ma Long
- Female Table Tennis Star: (China) Ding Ning
- Male Para Table Tennis Star: (Belgium) Laurens Devos
- Female Para Table Tennis Star: (China) Liu Jing
- Table Tennis Star Coach: (China) Liu Guoliang
- Table Tennis Breakthrough Star: (Japan) Miu Hirano
- Table Tennis Star Point: (China) Fan Zhendong at the 2016 Japan Open
- Fair Play Star: (Egypt) Rinad Fathy

== See also ==
- 2016 World Team Table Tennis Championships
- Table tennis at the 2016 Summer Olympics
