= 2019 Qatar Open (table tennis) =

Tournament details
- Dates: 28–31 March 2019
- Competitors: 32S / 16D
- Total prize money: US$300,000
- Venue: Ali Bin Hamad al-Attiyah Arena
- Location: Doha, Qatar

Champions
- Men's singles: (China) Ma Long
- Women's singles: (China) Wang Manyu
- Men's doubles: (Hong Kong) Ho Kwan Kit (Hong Kong) Wong Chun Ting
- Women's doubles: (China) Sun Yingsha (China) Wang Manyu
- Mixed doubles: (China) Xu Xin (China) Liu Shiwen

The 2019 Qatar Open was the second event of the 2019 ITTF World Tour. It took place from 28 to 31 March in Doha, Qatar.

== Men's singles ==
The Men's singles was won by Chinese player Ma Long.With this victory he entered into the record books by equally 27 ITTF World Tour Titles achieved by Vladimir Samsonov.

=== Seeds ===
1. (China) Xu Xin (semifinals)
2. (China) Lin Gaoyuan (final)
3. (Japan) Tomokazu Harimoto (quarterfinals)
4. (Germany) Timo Boll (second round)
5. (Brazil) Hugo Calderano (first round)
6. (South Korea) Lee Sang-su (first round)
7. (Hong Kong) Wong Chun Ting (first round)
8. (Japan) Koki Niwa (second round)
9. (Japan) Jun Mizutani (quarterfinals)
10. (South Korea) Jang Woo-jin (second round)
11. (China) Ma Long (champion)
12. (Sweden) Mattias Falck (semifinals)
13. (Germany) Dimitrij Ovtcharov (second round)
14. (Germany) Patrick Franziska (quarterfinals)
15. (China) Liang Jingkun (second round)
16. (Qatar) Mohammed Abdulwahhab (first round)

=== Draw ===
==== Top half ====
First round
1	(China) Xu Xin	9	11	11	11	11
(South Korea) Lim Jong-hoon	11	7	7	9	7
(Japan) Yuya Oshima	12	11	11	11
16	(Qatar) Mohammed Abdulwahhab	10	2	4	4
14	(Germany) Patrick Franziska	8	11	11	11	11
(France) Simon Gauzy	11	5	5	7	2
(Japan) Maharu Yoshimura	7	11	11	9	1	12
8	(Japan) Koki Niwa	11	8	3	11	11	14
6	(South Korea) Lee Sang-su	9	12	7	8
(Czech Republic) Pavel Širůček	11	14	11	11
(Croatia) Andrej Gaćina
9	(Japan) Jun Mizutani	w/o
11	(China) Ma Long	6	11	12	9	11	11
(France) Tristan Flore	11	5	10	11	5	7
(Germany) Benedikt Duda	4	8	4	12
4	(Germany) Timo Boll	11	11	11	14

Second round
1	(China) Xu Xin	9	10	11	11	13	11
(Japan) Yuya Oshima	11	12	3	8	11	4
14	(Germany) Patrick Franziska	10	13	12	7	12	11	11
8	(Japan) Koki Niwa	12	11	10	11	14	4	6
(Czech Republic) Pavel Širůček	8	10	4	5
9	(Japan) Jun Mizutani	11	12	11	11
11	(China) Ma Long	12	11	11	11
4	(Germany) Timo Boll	10	7	4	8

Quarterfinals
1	(China) Xu Xin	8	11	11	11	11
14	(Germany) Patrick Franziska	11	8	7	8	7
9	(Japan) Jun Mizutani	2	6	6	13
11	(China) Ma Long	11	11	11	15

Semifinals
1	(China) Xu Xin	14	6	11	10	7	6
11	(China) Ma Long	12	11	8	12	11	11

==== Bottom half ====
First round
3	(Japan) Tomokazu Harimoto	12	14	11	9	11
(Japan) Masataka Morizono	10	12	6	11	6
(South Korea) Jeoung Young-sik	8	11	9	8	11	7
15	(China) Liang Jingkun	11	5	11	11	8	11
12	(Sweden) Mattias Falck	11	12	12	11	8	11
(China) Zhou Qihao	4	10	14	9	11	4
(Belgium) Cédric Nuytinck	11	16	8	11	4	11
5	(Brazil) Hugo Calderano	4	14	11	9	11	7
7	(Hong Kong) Wong Chun Ting	7	7	3	11	7
(Chinese Taipei) Lin Yun-ju	11	11	11	5	11
(Chinese Taipei) Chen Chien-an	6	11	3	9	6
13	(Germany) Dimitrij Ovtcharov	11	4	11	11	11
10	(South Korea) Jang Woo-jin	11	7	9	11	11	11
(Brazil) Thiago Monteiro	4	11	11	8	8	4
(Croatia) Tomislav Pucar	11	11	10	6	11	5	9
2	(China) Lin Gaoyuan	7	4	12	11	7	11	11

Second round
3	(Japan) Tomokazu Harimoto	12	11	11	11
15	(China) Liang Jingkun	10	8	8	8
12	(Sweden) Mattias Falck	10	11	11	11	8	11
(Belgium) Cédric Nuytinck	12	5	4	7	11	4
(Chinese Taipei) Lin Yun-ju	11	6	11	12	9	11
13	(Germany) Dimitrij Ovtcharov	4	11	3	10	11	7
10	(South Korea) Jang Woo-jin	4	11	7	8	11
2	(China) Lin Gaoyuan	11	2	11	11	13

Quarterfinals
3	(Japan) Tomokazu Harimoto	8	11	1	6	11	11	5
12	(Sweden) Mattias Falck	11	9	11	11	8	3	11
(Chinese Taipei) Lin Yun-ju	12	12	6	10	11	9
2	(China) Lin Gaoyuan	14	10	11	12	9	11

Semifinals
12	(Sweden) Mattias Falck	11	11	9	9	9	11	10
2	(China) Lin Gaoyuan	7	9	11	11	11	9	12

==== Finals ====
Semifinals									Final
1	(China) Xu Xin	14	6	11	10	7	6
11	(China) Ma Long	12	11	8	12	11	11		11	(China) Ma Long	9	8	11	11	11	11
12	(Sweden) Mattias Falck	11	11	9	9	9	11	10	2	(China) Lin Gaoyuan	11	11	5	5	9	9
2	(China) Lin Gaoyuan	7	9	11	11	11	9	12

== Women's singles ==
=== Seeds ===
1. (China) Ding Ning (semifinals)
2. (Japan) Kasumi Ishikawa (first round)
3. (China) Liu Shiwen (final)
4. (China) Wang Manyu (champion)
5. (Japan) Mima Ito (quarterfinals)
6. (Chinese Taipei) Cheng I-ching (first round)
7. (Japan) Miu Hirano (second round)
8. (Singapore) Feng Tianwei (quarterfinals)
9. (South Korea) Seo Hyo-won (first round)
10. (Japan) Hitomi Sato (first round)
11. (Hong Kong) Doo Hoi Kem (second round)
12. (Japan) Saki Shibata (first round)
13. (China) Chen Xingtong (second round)
14. (South Korea) Jeon Ji-hee (first round)
15. (Austria) Sofia Polcanova (first round)
16. (Qatar) Maha Faramarzi (first round)

=== Draw ===
==== Top half ====
First round
1	(China) Ding Ning	12	13	11	11
(Chinese Taipei) Chen Szu-yu	10	11	7	4
(Germany) Han Ying	11	13	6	11	11
12	(Japan) Saki Shibata	8	11	11	9	4
11	(Hong Kong) Doo Hoi Kem	6	1	11	12	11	15
(Hong Kong) Lee Ho Ching	11	11	9	10	9	13
(Japan) Minami Ando	11	6	12	7	11	8
5	(Japan) Mima Ito	9	11	14	11	8	11
8	(Singapore) Feng Tianwei	11	11	11	9	12
(South Korea) Yoo Eun-chong	7	9	5	11	10
(Japan) Miyu Kato	11	6	7	13	11	8	15
10	(Japan) Hitomi Sato	7	11	11	11	9	11	13
13	(China) Chen Xingtong	11	11	11	12
(South Korea) Choi Hyo-joo	9	6	6	10
(Ukraine) Margaryta Pesotska	8	1	12	11	4
4	(China) Wang Manyu	11	11	10	13	11

Second round
1	(China) Ding Ning	11	11	11	18
(Germany) Han Ying	7	7	4	16
11	(Hong Kong) Doo Hoi Kem	9	10	9	8
5	(Japan) Mima Ito	11	12	11	11
8	(Singapore) Feng Tianwei	11	11	6	11	9	11
(Japan) Miyu Kato	9	4	11	5	11	9
13	(China) Chen Xingtong	11	8	11	4	6	4
4	(China) Wang Manyu	4	11	8	11	11	11

Quarterfinals
1	(China) Ding Ning	12	12	11	11
5	(Japan) Mima Ito	10	10	4	8
8	(Singapore) Feng Tianwei	5	9	3	11	7
4	(China) Wang Manyu	11	11	11	7	11

Semifinals
1	(China) Ding Ning	6	1	6	4
4	(China) Wang Manyu	11	11	11	11

==== Bottom half ====
First round
3	(China) Liu Shiwen	11	11	11	11
(Sweden) Matilda Ekholm	9	9	5	6
(China) Gu Yuting	11	9	11	11	11
15	(Austria) Sofia Polcanova	7	11	8	6	7
9	(South Korea) Seo Hyo-won
(China) Wang Yidi	w/o
(Chinese Taipei) Cheng Hsien-tzu	11	11	9	3	13	11
6	(Chinese Taipei) Cheng I-ching	7	9	11	11	11	6
7	(Japan) Miu Hirano	11	11	11	17
(Portugal) Fu Yu	7	8	3	15
(China) He Zhuojia	5	6	12	14	11	11
14	(South Korea) Jeon Ji-hee	11	11	10	12	6	8
16	(Qatar) Maha Faramarzi	2	1	2	3
(South Korea) Kim Ha-yeong	11	11	11	11
(China) Sun Yingsha	11	11	14	11
2	(Japan) Kasumi Ishikawa	7	9	12	5

Second round
3	(China) Liu Shiwen	11	11	11	13
(China) Gu Yuting	8	5	5	11
(China) Wang Yidi	13	11	11	11
(Chinese Taipei) Cheng Hsien-tzu	11	5	8	8
7	(Japan) Miu Hirano	7	8	8	11	11	5
(China) He Zhuojia	11	11	11	8	9	11
(South Korea) Kim Ha-yeong	4	5	4	3
(China) Sun Yingsha	11	11	11	11

Quarterfinals
3	(China) Liu Shiwen	11	11	11	11
(China) Wang Yidi	2	7	8	4
(China) He Zhuojia	11	4	4	8	5
(China) Sun Yingsha	6	11	11	11	11

Semifinals
3	(China) Liu Shiwen	5	11	8	11	9	11	11
(China) Sun Yingsha	11	6	11	5	11	6	5

==== Finals ====
Semifinals									Final
1	(China) Ding Ning	6	1	6	4
4	(China) Wang Manyu	11	11	11	11				4	(China) Wang Manyu	11	10	12	11	5	11
3	(China) Liu Shiwen	5	11	8	11	9	11	11	3	(China) Liu Shiwen	3	12	10	6	11	5
	(China) Sun Yingsha	11	6	11	5	11	6	5

== Men's doubles ==
=== Seeds ===
1. (South Korea) Jeoung Young-sik / Lee Sang-su (semifinals)
2. (Japan) Masataka Morizono / Yuya Oshima (quarterfinals)
3. (Hong Kong) Ho Kwan Kit / Wong Chun Ting (champions)
4. (Chinese Taipei) Liao Cheng-ting / Lin Yun-ju (first round)
5. (Chinese Taipei) Chen Chien-an / Chuang Chih-yuan (first round)
6. (Sweden) Mattias Falck / Kristian Karlsson (quarterfinals)
7. (China) Lin Gaoyuan / Ma Long (quarterfinals)
8. (Qatar) Mohammed Abdulwahhab / Abdulrahman Al-Naggar (first round)

=== Draw ===
First round
1	(South Korea) Jeoung / Lee	11	11	11
(Japan) Harimoto / Kizukuri	7	8	8
(England) Drinkhall / Walker	12	10	8	8
7	(China) Lin / Ma	10	12	11	11
8	(Qatar) Abdulwahhab / Al-Naggar	11	6	2	9
(Romania) Ionescu / (Spain) Robles	9	11	11	11
(Belgium) Allegro / Lambiet	6	6	8
3	(Hong Kong) Ho / Wong	11	11	11
4	(Chinese Taipei) Liao / Lin	10	11	6	11	7
(Poland) Dyjas / (Belgium) Nuytinck	12	9	11	6	11
(Germany) Ovtcharov / Walther	6	8	9
6	(Sweden) Falck / Karlsson	11	11	11
5	(Chinese Taipei) Chen / Chuang	4	8	3
(Germany) Boll / Franziska	11	11	11
(China) Liang / Wang	11	14	8	5
2	(Japan) Morizono / Oshima	8	16	11	11

Quarterfinals
1	(South Korea) Jeoung / Lee	11	11	11
7	(China) Lin / Ma	7	8	8
(Romania) Ionescu / (Spain) Robles	6	3	11
3	(Hong Kong) Ho / Wong	11	11	13
(Poland) Dyjas / (Belgium) Nuytinck	11	4	13	6	12
6	(Sweden) Falck / Karlsson	8	11	11	11	10
(Germany) Boll / Franziska	7	7	11	11	15
2	(Japan) Morizono / Oshima	11	11	7	3	13

Semifinals
1	(South Korea) Jeoung / Lee	6	11	7	11	10
3	(Hong Kong) Ho / Wong	11	9	11	8	12
(Poland) Dyjas / (Belgium) Nuytinck	8	14	3
(Germany) Boll / Franziska	11	16	11

Final
3	(Hong Kong) Ho / Wong	11	7	11	11
(Germany) Boll / Franziska	4	11	9	9

== Women's doubles ==
=== Seeds ===
1. (Japan) Hina Hayata / Mima Ito (semifinals)
2. (China) Sun Yingsha / Wang Manyu (champions)
3. (Japan) Honoka Hashimoto / Hitomi Sato (semifinals)
4. (Hong Kong) Doo Hoi Kem / Lee Ho Ching (quarterfinals)
5. (Hong Kong) Ng Wing Nam / Soo Wai Yam Minnie (first round)
6. (Slovakia) Barbora Balážová / (Czech Republic) Hana Matelová (quarterfinals)
7. (South Korea) Jeon Ji-hee / Lee Zion (first round)
8. (Qatar) Maha Faramarzi / Aia Mohamed (first round)

=== Draw ===
First round
1	(Japan) Hayata / Ito	11	11	11
(South Korea) Choi / Yoo	7	8	6
(Chinese Taipei) Chen / Cheng	11	11	11
8	(Qatar) Faramarzi / Mohamed	1	6	3
5	(Hong Kong) Ng / Soo	4	9	8
(China) Ding / Wang	11	11	11
(Belarus) Bogdanova / Trigolos	9	6	10
4	(Hong Kong) Doo / Lee	11	11	12
3	(Japan) Hashimoto / Sato	10	11	11	11
(Singapore) Lin / Zeng	12	7	9	6
(Germany) Mittelham / Winter	6	11	9	15	11
7	(South Korea) Jeon / Lee	11	9	11	13	7
6	(Slovakia) Balážová / (Czech Republic) Matelová	7	11	13	11
(Spain) Xiao / (Canada) Zhang	11	1	11	8
(Chinese Taipei) Liu / Su	6	9	7
2	(China) Sun / Wang	11	11	11

Quarterfinals
1	(Japan) Hayata / Ito	8	11	11	11
(Chinese Taipei) Chen / Cheng	11	5	7	7
(China) Ding / Wang	11	11	12	11
4	(Hong Kong) Doo / Lee	8	4	14	2
3	(Japan) Hashimoto / Sato	11	12	8	12
(Germany) Mittelham / Winter	7	10	11	10
6	(Slovakia) Balážová / (Czech Republic) Matelová	11	6	12
2	(China) Sun / Wang	13	11	14

Semifinals
1	(Japan) Hayata / Ito	9	5	5
(China) Ding / Wang	11	11	11
3	(Japan) Hashimoto / Sato	8	7	11	11	6
2	(China) Sun / Wang	11	11	8	9	11

Final
(China) Ding / Wang	14	14	6	13	4
2	(China) Sun / Wang	12	16	11	11	11

== Mixed doubles ==
=== Seeds ===
1. (Hong Kong) Wong Chun Ting / Doo Hoi Kem (first round)
2. (South Korea) Lee Sang-su / Jeon Ji-hee (quarterfinals)
3. (Slovakia) Ľubomír Pištej / Barbora Balážová (first round)
4. (Japan) Masataka Morizono / Mima Ito (final)
5. (China) Xu Xin / Liu Shiwen (champions)
6. (Chinese Taipei) Lin Yun-ju / Cheng I-ching (semifinals)
7. (Japan) Tomokazu Harimoto / Kasumi Ishikawa (quarterfinals)
8. (Spain) Álvaro Robles / Galia Dvorak (first round)

=== Draw ===
First round
1	(Hong Kong) Wong / Doo	9	8	5
(South Korea) Jang / Choi	11	11	11
(United States) Jha / Wu	6	12	4	6
6	(Chinese Taipei) Lin / Cheng	11	10	11	11
7	(Japan) Harimoto / Ishikawa	11	11	11
(Romania) Ionescu / Szőcs	6	2	1
(Germany) Filus / Han	7	11	2	8
4	(Japan) Morizono / Ito	11	7	11	11
3	(Slovakia) Pištej / Balážová	12	6	6	10
(France) Flore / Gasnier	10	11	11	12
(Hong Kong) Ho / Lee	11	11	11
8	(Spain) Robles / Dvorak	5	7	1
5	(China) Xu / Liu	11	11	11
(Germany) Franziska / Solja	6	8	7
(Austria) Fegerl / Polcanova	13	11	12	5	4
2	(South Korea) Lee / Jeon	11	9	14	11	11

Quarterfinals
(South Korea) Jang / Choi	4	3	5
6	(Chinese Taipei) Lin / Cheng	11	11	11
7	(Japan) Harimoto / Ishikawa	8	11	9	9
4	(Japan) Morizono / Ito	11	9	11	11
(France) Flore / Gasnier	6	9	3
(Hong Kong) Ho / Lee	11	11	11
5	(China) Xu / Liu	8	12	11	11
2	(South Korea) Lee / Jeon	11	10	3	6

Semifinals
6	(Chinese Taipei) Lin / Cheng	11	11	9	6	14
4	(Japan) Morizono / Ito	9	9	11	11	16
(Hong Kong) Ho / Lee	6	1	9
5	(China) Xu / Liu	11	11	11

Final
4	(Japan) Morizono / Ito	5	7	7
5	(China) Xu / Liu	11	11	11
