= 2019 World Table Tennis Championships – Mixed doubles =

Mixed doubles at the 2019 World Table Tennis Championships
- Venue: Hungexpo
- Location: Budapest, Hungary
- Dates: 22–26 April
- Final score: 11–5, 11–8, 9–11, 11–9, 11–4

Medalists
gold medal	Xu Xin; Liu Shiwen	China
silver medal	Maharu Yoshimura; Kasumi Ishikawa	Japan
bronze medal	Fan Zhendong; Ding Ning	China
bronze medal	Patrick Franziska; Petrissa Solja	Germany

The mixed doubles competition of the 2019 World Table Tennis Championships was held from 22 to 26 April 2019. Maharu Yoshimura and Kasumi Ishikawa were the defending champions. Ishikawa initially teamed up with Tomokazu Harimoto, but Harimoto was replaced by Yoshimura due to an injury.

Xu Xin and Liu Shiwen won the title after defeating Maharu Yoshimura and Kasumi Ishikawa 11–5, 11–8, 9–11, 11–9, 11–4.

== Seeds ==
1. (Hong Kong) Wong Chun Ting / (Hong Kong) Doo Hoi Kem (second round)
2. (Japan) Maharu Yoshimura / (Japan) Kasumi Ishikawa (final)
3. (China) Xu Xin / (China) Liu Shiwen (champions)
4. (Japan) Masataka Morizono / (Japan) Mima Ito (quarterfinals)
5. (South Korea) Lee Sang-su / (South Korea) Jeon Ji-hee (quarterfinals)
6. (Chinese Taipei) Lin Yun-ju / (Chinese Taipei) Cheng I-ching (third round)
7. (Slovakia) Ľubomír Pištej / (Slovakia) Barbora Balážová (quarterfinals)
8. (Hong Kong) Ho Kwan Kit / (Hong Kong) Lee Ho Ching (quarterfinals)
9. (Spain) Álvaro Robles / (Spain) Galia Dvorak (second round)
10. (South Korea) Jang Woo-jin / (South Korea) Choi Hyo-joo (third round)
11. (Austria) Stefan Fegerl / (Austria) Sofia Polcanova (third round)
12. (Germany) Patrick Franziska / (Germany) Petrissa Solja (semifinals)
13. (Hungary) Ádám Szudi / (Hungary) Szandra Pergel (third round)
14. (Sweden) Mattias Falck / (Sweden) Matilda Ekholm (second round)
15. (Romania) Ovidiu Ionescu / (Romania) Bernadette Szőcs (third round)
16. (France) Tristan Flore / (France) Laura Gasnier (third round)
17. (United States) Kanak Jha / (United States) Yue Wu (second round)
18. (North Korea) Ham Yu-song / (North Korea) Cha Hyo-sim (second round)
19. (Puerto Rico) Brian Afanador / (Puerto Rico) Adriana Díaz (second round)
20. (Belgium) Cédric Nuytinck / (Belgium) Lisa Lung (first round)
21. (Nigeria) Segun Toriola / (Nigeria) Olufunke Oshonaike (first round)
22. (Netherlands) Laurens Tromer / (Netherlands) Britt Eerland (first round)
23. (Australia) Hu Heming / (Australia) Melissa Tapper (first round)
24. (Egypt) Omar Assar / (Egypt) Dina Meshref (first round)
25. (Serbia) Aleksandar Karakašević / (Serbia) Izabela Lupulesku (first round)
26. (Russia) Alexander Shibaev / (Russia) Polina Mikhaylova (third round)
27. (India) Sharath Kamal / (India) Manika Batra (first round)
28. (Australia) Kane Townsend / (Australia) Michelle Bromley (first round)
29. (Thailand) Padasak Tanviriyavechakul / (Thailand) Suthasini Sawettabut (second round)
30. (Hungary) Nándor Ecseki / (Hungary) Dóra Madarász (first round)
31. (Argentina) Gaston Alto / (Argentina) Ana Codina (first round)
32. (Egypt) Khalid Assar / (Egypt) Yousra Helmy (first round)

== Draw ==
=== Key ===
- Q = Qualifier
- w/o = Walkover
- w/d = Withdraw
- r = Retired
- DQ = Disqualified

=== Finals ===
Semifinals							Final
	(China) Fan Zhendong (China) Ding Ning	5	8	11	14
3	(China) Xu Xin (China) Liu Shiwen	11	11	13	16		3	(China) Xu Xin (China) Liu Shiwen	11	11	9	11	11
12	(Germany) Patrick Franziska (Germany) Petrissa Solja	9	6	6	11	6	2	(Japan) Maharu Yoshimura (Japan) Kasumi Ishikawa	5	8	11	9	4
2	(Japan) Maharu Yoshimura (Japan) Kasumi Ishikawa	11	11	11	5	11

=== Top half ===
==== Section 1 ====
First round
1	(Hong Kong) Wong (Hong Kong) Doo	11	11	11	11
(Romania) Pletea (Romania) Samara	3	5	4	5
(China) Fan (China) Ding	11	11	5	11	11
30	(Hungary) Ecseki (Hungary) Madarász	1	7	11	6	5
24	(Egypt) O. Assar (Egypt) Meshref	11	11	7	9	13	5	7
(Ukraine) Zhmudenko (Ukraine) Brateyko	3	7	11	11	11	11	11
(North Korea) An (North Korea) Kim	10	12	9	12	11	11	6
16	(France) Flore (France) Gasnier	12	10	11	14	9	4	11
15	(Romania) Ionescu (Romania) Szőcs	11	12	11	11
(Chinese Taipei) Peng (Chinese Taipei) Cheng	3	10	8	8
(Poland) Badowski (Poland) Bajor	12	11	11	11	11
27	(India) Kamal (India) Batra	14	6	5	6	3
25	(Serbia) Karakašević (Serbia) Lupulesku	11	9	10	8	11	12	9
(Hungary) Majoros (Hungary) Bálint	6	11	12	11	6	10	11
(Thailand) Wisutmaythangkoon (Thailand) Paranang	11	7	8	4	9
8	(Hong Kong) Ho (Hong Kong) Lee	9	11	11	11	11

Second round
1	(Hong Kong) Wong (Hong Kong) Doo	7	9	16	5
(China) Fan (China) Ding	11	11	18	11
(Ukraine) Zhmudenko (Ukraine) Brateyko	1	5	13	5	4
16	(France) Flore (France) Gasnier	11	11	11	11	11
15	(Romania) Ionescu (Romania) Szőcs	6	11	15	12	11
(Poland) Badowski (Poland) Bajor	11	8	13	10	9
(Hungary) Majoros (Hungary) Bálint	7	4	6	11	3
8	(Hong Kong) Ho (Hong Kong) Lee	11	11	11	8	11

Third round
(China) Fan (China) Ding	11	11	11	7	11
16	(France) Flore (France) Gasnier	6	8	9	11	5
15	(Romania) Ionescu (Romania) Szőcs	9	11	6	11	10
8	(Hong Kong) Ho (Hong Kong) Lee	11	8	11	13	12

Quarterfinals
(China) Fan (China) Ding	11	11	11	11
8	(Hong Kong) Ho (Hong Kong) Lee	1	8	1	8

==== Section 2 ====
First round
5	(South Korea) Lee (South Korea) Jeon	11	13	11	11
(Belarus) Platonov (Belarus) Bogdanova	8	11	4	7
(Singapore) Chew (Singapore) Lin	11	11	11	7	11
28	(Australia) Townsend (Australia) Bromley	2	8	6	11	4
22	(Netherlands) Tromer (Netherlands) Eerland	8	12	9	3
(India) Gnanasekaran (India) Kamath	11	14	11	11
(Italy) Bobocica (Italy) Vivarelli	11	11	10	11	6	8
9	(Spain) Robles (Spain) Dvorak	13	8	12	2	11	11
14	(Sweden) Falck (Sweden) Ekholm	11	11	3	11	13
(Brazil) Tsuboi (Brazil) Takahashi	4	7	11	9	11
(Luxembourg) Glod (Luxembourg) De Nutte	5	9	5	5
26	(Russia) Shibaev (Russia) Mikhaylova	11	11	11	11
23	(Australia) Hu (Australia) Tapper	11	9	7	12	7	11	6
(Czech Republic) Polansky (Czech Republic) Matelová	8	11	11	10	11	9	11
(Luxembourg) Mladenovic (Luxembourg) Ni	6	4	4	2
3	(China) Xu (China) Liu	11	11	11	11

Second round
5	(South Korea) Lee (South Korea) Jeon	11	11	11	12
(Singapore) Chew (Singapore) Lin	6	5	8	10
(India) Gnanasekaran (India) Kamath	11	11	11	11	11
9	(Spain) Robles (Spain) Dvorak	9	4	8	13	9
14	(Sweden) Falck (Sweden) Ekholm	9	9	3	11	11
26	(Russia) Shibaev (Russia) Mikhaylova	11	11	11	7	13
(Czech Republic) Polansky (Czech Republic) Matelová	8	5	6	10
3	(China) Xu (China) Liu	11	11	11	12

Third round
5	(South Korea) Lee (South Korea) Jeon	11	11	7	11	11
(India) Gnanasekaran (India) Kamath	6	4	11	7	8
26	(Russia) Shibaev (Russia) Mikhaylova	8	6	6	2
3	(China) Xu (China) Liu	11	11	11	11

Quarterfinals
5	(South Korea) Lee (South Korea) Jeon	12	11	7	9	11	5	7
3	(China) Xu (China) Liu	10	9	11	11	9	11	11

=== Bottom half ===
==== Section 3 ====
First round
4	(Japan) Morizono (Japan) Ito	11	11	11	11
(Uzbekistan) Teshaboev (Uzbekistan) Khadjieva	1	2	4	5
(Turkey) Yigenler (Turkey) Yılmaz	11	11	13	10	6	8	11
21	(Nigeria) Toriola (Nigeria) Oshonaike	8	6	11	12	11	11	4
32	(Egypt) K. Assar (Egypt) Helmy	8	5	9	6
(Mexico) Madrid (Mexico) Silva	11	11	11	11
(Chile) Lamadrid (Chile) Vega	7	8	6	8
10	(South Korea) Jang (South Korea) Choi	11	11	11	11
12	(Germany) Franziska (Germany) Solja	11	14	11	11
(Russia) Ivonin (Russia) Noskova	7	12	8	7
(Slovakia) Kalužný (Slovakia) Kukuľková	13	11	10	11	9	11
31	(Argentina) Alto (Argentina) Codina	11	9	12	6	11	6
29	(Thailand) Tanviriyavechakul (Thailand) Sawettabut	11	11	7	10	11	11
(Argentina) Cifuentes (Argentina) Arguelles	5	9	11	12	5	3
(Serbia) Pető (Serbia) Todorović	7	5	4	8
6	(Chinese Taipei) Lin (Chinese Taipei) Cheng	11	11	11	11

Second round
4	(Japan) Morizono (Japan) Ito	12	11	11	11
(Turkey) Yigenler (Turkey) Yılmaz	10	4	8	9
(Mexico) Madrid (Mexico) Silva	3	8	5	2
10	(South Korea) Jang (South Korea) Choi	11	11	11	11
12	(Germany) Franziska (Germany) Solja	11	11	11	11
(Slovakia) Kalužný (Slovakia) Kukuľková	7	2	6	4
29	(Thailand) Tanviriyavechakul (Thailand) Sawettabut	7	4	4	6
6	(Chinese Taipei) Lin (Chinese Taipei) Cheng	11	11	11	11

Third round
4	(Japan) Morizono (Japan) Ito	11	11	11	11
10	(South Korea) Jang (South Korea) Choi	7	9	3	6
12	(Germany) Franziska (Germany) Solja	11	11	5	11	11
6	(Chinese Taipei) Lin (Chinese Taipei) Cheng	9	7	11	7	8

Quarterfinals
4	(Japan) Morizono (Japan) Ito	11	8	11	13	13	8
12	(Germany) Franziska (Germany) Solja	13	11	3	11	15	11

==== Section 4 ====
First round
7	(Slovakia) Pištej (Slovakia) Balážová	9	13	11	12	11
(Spain) Cantero (Spain) Maria	11	11	2	10	8
(Germany) Qiu (Germany) Mittelham	8	11	11	11	7	8	11
20	(Belgium) Nuytinck (Belgium) Lung	11	7	8	9	11	11	9
19	(Puerto Rico) Afanador (Puerto Rico) Díaz	4	9	12	12	11	11
(Sweden) Karlsson (Sweden) Källberg	11	11	10	10	7	7
(Italy) Stoyanov (Italy) Piccolin	8	11	11	7	8
11	(Austria) Fegerl (Austria) Polcanova	11	7	13	11	11
13	(Hungary) Szudi (Hungary) Pergel	11	11	8	11	11
(Denmark) Rasmussen (Denmark) Christensen	8	9	11	8	6
(Poland) Dyjas (Poland) Partyka	10	3	5	11	16	2
17	(United States) Jha (United States) Wu	12	11	11	2	14	11
18	(North Korea) Ham (North Korea) Cha	8	11	11	7	11	11
(Brazil) Jouti (Brazil) Gui	11	9	4	11	7	8
(Switzerland) Weber (Switzerland) Moret	11	10	4	8	7
2	(Japan) Yoshimura (Japan) Ishikawa	9	12	11	11	11

Second round
7	(Slovakia) Pištej (Slovakia) Balážová	11	12	7	11	8	11
(Germany) Qiu (Germany) Mittelham	7	10	11	8	11	8
19	(Puerto Rico) Afanador (Puerto Rico) Díaz	9	9	11	12	11	8
11	(Austria) Fegerl (Austria) Polcanova	11	11	8	10	13	11
13	(Hungary) Szudi (Hungary) Pergel	11	11	12	11
17	(United States) Jha (United States) Wu	8	5	10	4
18	(North Korea) Ham (North Korea) Cha	8	7	8	9
2	(Japan) Yoshimura (Japan) Ishikawa	11	11	11	11

Third round
7	(Slovakia) Pištej (Slovakia) Balážová	12	11	11	11	11
11	(Austria) Fegerl (Austria) Polcanova	14	5	8	8	6
13	(Hungary) Szudi (Hungary) Pergel	11	12	11	6	8	10
2	(Japan) Yoshimura (Japan) Ishikawa	5	14	6	11	11	12

Quarterfinals
7	(Slovakia) Pištej (Slovakia) Balážová	11	8	5	11	7	8
2	(Japan) Yoshimura (Japan) Ishikawa	6	11	11	8	11	11
