= 2016 ITTF World Tour Grand Finals =

Tournament details
- Dates: 8–11 December 2016
- Edition: 21st
- Total prize money: US$500,000
- Venue: Ali Bin Hamad al-Attiyah Arena
- Location: Doha, Qatar

Champions
- Men's singles: (China) Ma Long
- Women's singles: (China) Zhu Yuling
- Men's doubles: (South Korea) Jung Young-sik (South Korea) Lee Sang-su
- Women's doubles: (Japan) Yui Hamamoto (Japan) Hina Hayata
- Official website: 2016 ITTF World Tour Grand Finals

The 2016 ITTF World Tour Grand Finals was the final competition of the 2016 ITTF World Tour, the International Table Tennis Federation's professional table tennis world tour. It was the 21st edition of the competition, and was held from 8–11 December 2016 in Doha, Qatar.

The competition featured events in six categories: men's and women's singles, men's and women's doubles, and under-21 men's and women's singles.

== Events ==
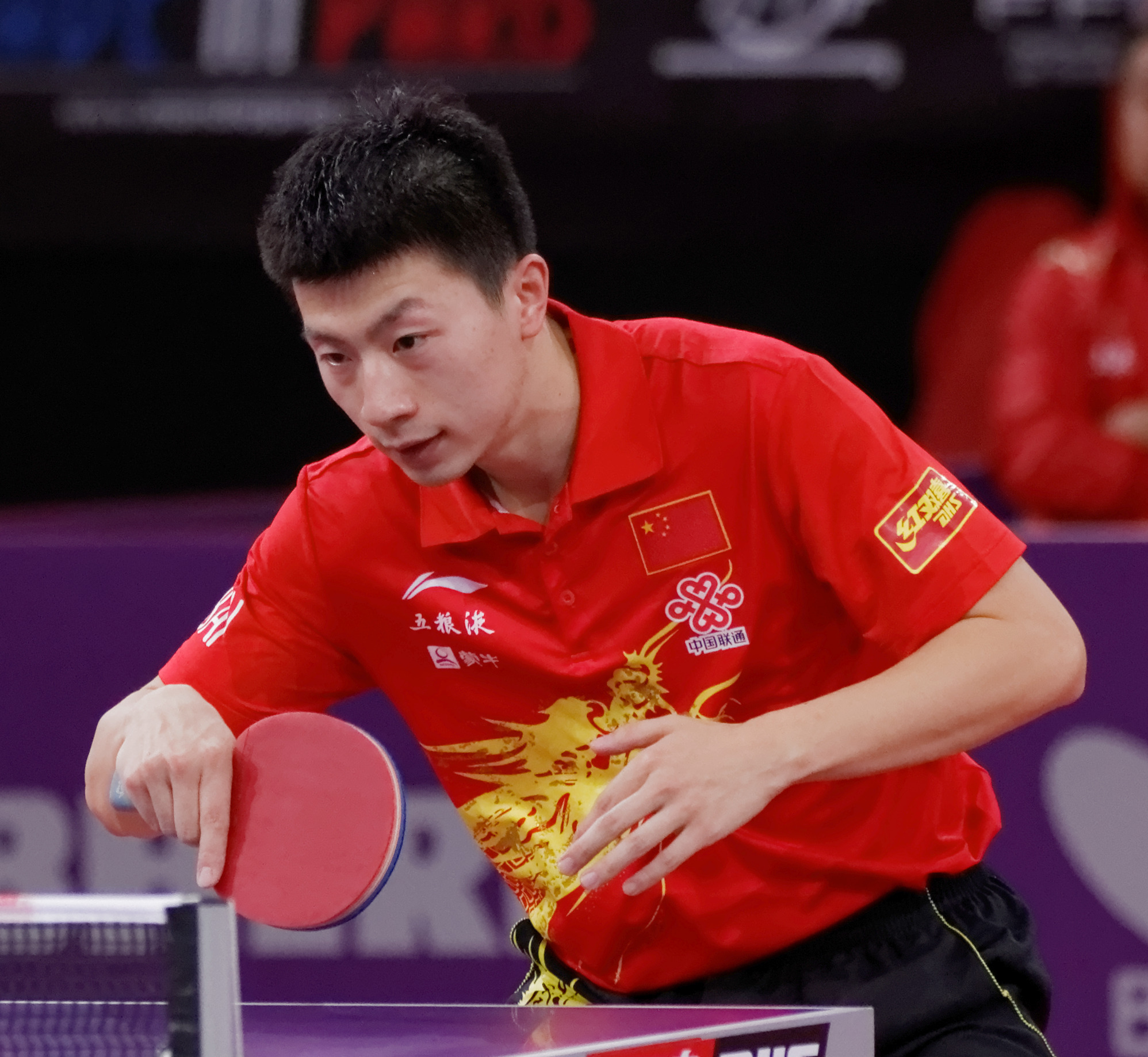
Ma Long

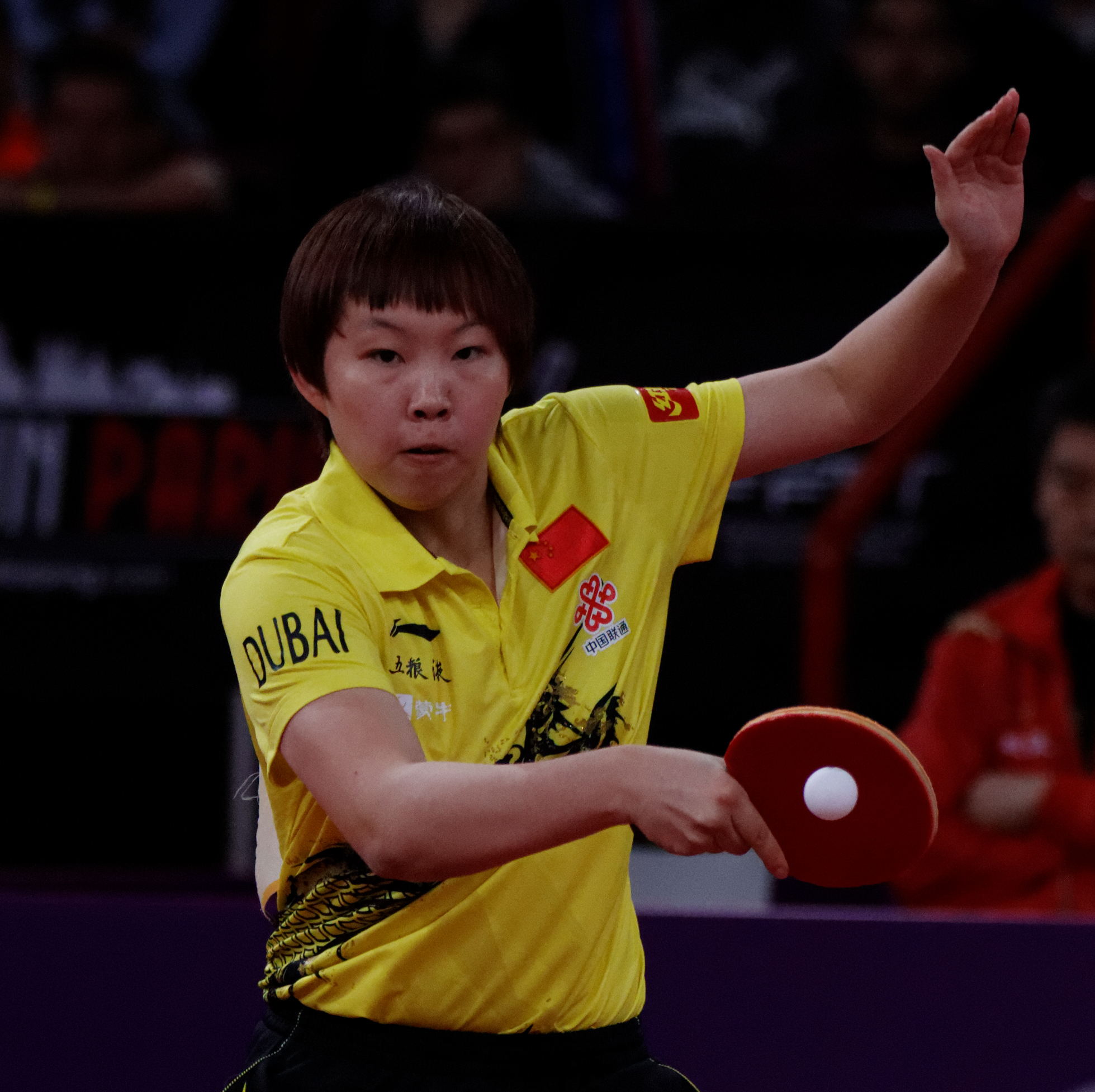
Zhu Yuling

| Event | Gold | Silver | Bronze |
|---|---|---|---|
| Men's Singles | (China) Ma Long | (China) Fan Zhendong | (South Korea) Jung Young-sik |
| Men's Singles | (China) Ma Long | (China) Fan Zhendong | (China) Xu Xin |
| Women's Singles | (China) Zhu Yuling | (Germany) Han Ying | (Japan) Miu Hirano |
| Women's Singles | (China) Zhu Yuling | (Germany) Han Ying | (Japan) Kasumi Ishikawa |
| Men's Doubles | (South Korea) Jung Young-sik (South Korea) Lee Sang-su | (Japan) Masataka Morizono (Japan) Yuya Oshima | (Hong Kong) Ho Kwan Kit (Hong Kong) Tang Peng |
| Men's Doubles | (South Korea) Jung Young-sik (South Korea) Lee Sang-su | (Japan) Masataka Morizono (Japan) Yuya Oshima | (Russia) Alexey Liventsov (Russia) Mikhail Paikov |
| Women's Doubles | (Japan) Yui Hamamoto (Japan) Hina Hayata | (Hong Kong) Doo Hoi Kem (Hong Kong) Lee Ho Ching | (Japan) Honoka Hashimoto (Japan) Hitomi Sato |
| Women's Doubles | (Japan) Yui Hamamoto (Japan) Hina Hayata | (Hong Kong) Doo Hoi Kem (Hong Kong) Lee Ho Ching | (South Korea) Jeon Ji-hee (South Korea) Yang Ha-eun |
| Under-21 Men's Singles | (Chinese Taipei) Liao Cheng-ting | (Japan) Yuto Muramatsu | (France) Can Akkuzu |
| Under-21 Men's Singles | (Chinese Taipei) Liao Cheng-ting | (Japan) Yuto Muramatsu | (Japan) Mizuki Oikawa |
| Under-21 Women's Singles | (Japan) Hina Hayata | (Hong Kong) Doo Hoi Kem | (Japan) Yui Hamamoto |
| Under-21 Women's Singles | (Japan) Hina Hayata | (Hong Kong) Doo Hoi Kem | (Japan) Miyu Kato |

== Qualification ==
Individual players and doubles pairs earned points based on their performances in the 20 events of the 2016 ITTF World Tour. The top 16 men's and women's singles players, the top eight men's and women's doubles pairs and the top eight under-21 men's and women's players who satisfied the qualification criteria were invited to compete. The seedings for the tournament draws were based on final tour standings, not the official ITTF world ranking.

=== Withdrawals ===
China's Liu Shiwen and Singapore's Yu Mengyu were not included on the list of confirmed players published on 25 November for the women's singles tournament, despite having finished in qualifying positions in the tour standings. It was later reported on 28 November that Liu Shiwen has been suspended from international competition by the Chinese team. On 1 December, China's Zhang Jike was forced to withdraw from the men's singles tournament because of a foot injury.

After winning her first round match, defending champion Ding Ning was forced to withdraw from the women's singles tournament due to illness.

== Men's singles ==
=== Players ===
1. (China) Ma Long (champion)
2. (China) Fan Zhendong (final)
3. (China) Xu Xin (semifinals)
4. (Japan) Jun Mizutani (first round)
5. (Chinese Taipei) Chuang Chih-yuan (quarterfinals)
6. (Belarus) Vladimir Samsonov (first round)
7. (Hong Kong) Wong Chun Ting (quarterfinals)
8. (Germany) Dimitrij Ovtcharov (quarterfinals)
9. (Japan) Kenta Matsudaira (first round)
10. (Japan) Yuto Muramatsu (quarterfinals)
11. (Chinese Taipei) Chen Chien-an (first round)
12. (South Korea) Jung Young-sik (semifinals)
13. (Japan) Yuya Oshima (first round)
14. (Hong Kong) Tang Peng (first round)
15. (Japan) Koki Niwa (first round)
16. (Qatar) Li Ping (first round)

=== Draw ===
First round
1 | (China) Ma Long | 4 | 11 | 7 | 11 | 11 | 11
16 | (Qatar) Li Ping | 11 | 9 | 11 | 3 | 6 | 8
9 | (Japan) K. Matsudaira | 11 | 14 | 8 | 11 | 9 | 16 | 8
7 | (Hong Kong) Wong C.T. | 6 | 12 | 11 | 13 | 11 | 14 | 11
5 | (Chinese Taipei) Chuang C-y. | 11 | 11 | 10 | 4 | 11 | 11
13 | (Japan) Y. Oshima | 8 | 7 | 12 | 11 | 4 | 9
12 | (South Korea) Jung Y-s. | 7 | 10 | 12 | 11 | 11 | 11 | 11
4 | (Japan) J. Mizutani | 11 | 12 | 10 | 8 | 13 | 7 | 9
3 | (China) Xu Xin | 11 | 11 | 11 | 11
11 | (Chinese Taipei) Chen C-a. | 8 | 5 | 6 | 8
10 | (Japan) Y. Muramatsu | 11 | 11 | 5 | 6 | 1 | 11 | 11
6 | (Belarus) V. Samsonov | 5 | 7 | 11 | 11 | 11 | 9 | 6
8 | (Germany) D. Ovtcharov | 11 | 11 | 13 | 14 | 11
14 | (Hong Kong) Tang Peng | 9 | 5 | 15 | 12 | 6
15 | (Japan) Koki Niwa | 6 | 7 | 7 | 11 | 4
2 | (China) Fan Z. | 11 | 11 | 11 | 9 | 11

Quarterfinals
1 | (China) Ma Long | 11 | 11 | 11 | 11
7 | (Hong Kong) Wong C.T. | 4 | 3 | 6 | 5
5 | (Chinese Taipei) Chuang C-y. | 13 | 12 | 6 | 7 | 10 | 1
12 | (South Korea) Jung Y-s. | 11 | 10 | 11 | 11 | 12 | 11
3 | (China) Xu Xin | 11 | 11 | 11 | 11
10 | (Japan) Y. Muramatsu | 2 | 6 | 5 | 4
8 | (Germany) D. Ovtcharov | 11 | 12 | 13 | 8 | 8 | 5
2 | (China) Fan Z. | 9 | 10 | 15 | 11 | 11 | 11

Semifinals
1 | (China) Ma Long | 11 | 11 | 11 | 14
12 | (South Korea) Jung Y-s. | 9 | 8 | 8 | 12
3 | (China) Xu Xin | 5 | 11 | 5 | 11 | 6 | 9
2 | (China) Fan Z. | 11 | 5 | 11 | 6 | 11 | 11

Final
1 | (China) Ma Long | 11 | 11 | 11 | 7 | 12 | 11
2 | (China) Fan Z. | 5 | 4 | 9 | 11 | 14 | 9

== Women's singles ==
=== Players ===
1. (China) Ding Ning (quarterfinals)
2. (Japan) Kasumi Ishikawa (semifinals)
3. (China) Zhu Yuling (champion)
4. (Singapore) Feng Tianwei (first round)
5. (Hong Kong) Tie Yana (quarterfinals)
6. (Chinese Taipei) Cheng I-ching (quarterfinals)
7. (Japan) Mima Ito (first round)
8. (South Korea) Yang Ha-eun (quarterfinals)
9. (Japan) Yuka Ishigaki (first round)
10. (Japan) Miu Hirano (semifinals)
11. (Germany) Han Ying (final)
12. (Hong Kong) Lee Ho Ching (first round)
13. (Germany) Shan Xiaona (first round)
14. (Japan) Hina Hayata (first round)
15. (South Korea) Seo Hyo-won (first round)
16. (Japan) Hitomi Sato (first round)

=== Draw ===
First round
1 | (China) Ding Ning | 14 | 11 | 11 | 11
12 | (Hong Kong) Lee H.C. | 12 | 7 | 5 | 6
11 | (Germany) Han Ying | 8 | 11 | 11 | 11 | 6 | 11
7 | (Japan) Mima Ito | 11 | 9 | 8 | 2 | 11 | 5
5 | (Hong Kong) Tie Yana | 9 | 7 | 12 | 11 | 6 | 11 | 11
9 | (Japan) Y. Ishigaki | 11 | 11 | 10 | 6 | 11 | 7 | 4
10 | (Japan) M. Hirano | 6 | 4 | 11 | 11 | 7 | 11 | 11
4 | (Singapore) Feng T. | 11 | 11 | 9 | 6 | 11 | 5 | 4
3 | (China) Zhu Yuling | 11 | 11 | 11 | 11
16 | (Japan) H. Sato | 3 | 6 | 5 | 3
14 | (Japan) H. Hayata | 6 | 8 | 5 | 9
6 | (Chinese Taipei) Cheng I-c. | 11 | 11 | 11 | 11
8 | (South Korea) Yang H-e. | 6 | 6 | 11 | 11 | 9 | 12 | 11
13 | (Germany) Shan X. | 11 | 11 | 9 | 7 | 11 | 10 | 9
15 | (South Korea) Seo H-w. | 11 | 11 | 9 | 4 | 8 | 11 | 5
2 | (Japan) K. Ishikawa | 8 | 2 | 11 | 11 | 11 | 6 | 11

Quarterfinals
1 | (China) Ding Ning
11 | (Germany) Han Ying | w | / | o
5 | (Hong Kong) Tie Yana | 9 | 7 | 11 | 11 | 11 | 8 | 6
10 | (Japan) M. Hirano | 11 | 11 | 8 | 5 | 6 | 11 | 11
3 | (China) Zhu Yuling | 8 | 10 | 12 | 11 | 11 | 11
6 | (Chinese Taipei) Cheng I-c. | 11 | 12 | 10 | 8 | 8 | 7
8 | (South Korea) Yang H-e. | 12 | 11 | 9 | 7 | 11 | 6
2 | (Japan) K. Ishikawa | 10 | 7 | 11 | 11 | 13 | 11

Semifinals
11 | (Germany) Han Ying | 11 | 11 | 11 | 11
10 | (Japan) M. Hirano | 2 | 4 | 3 | 5
3 | (China) Zhu Yuling | 16 | 11 | 11 | 11
2 | (Japan) K. Ishikawa | 14 | 3 | 8 | 6

Final
11 | (Germany) Han Ying | 9 | 10 | 10 | 3
3 | (China) Zhu Yuling | 11 | 12 | 12 | 11

== Men's doubles ==
=== Players ===
1. (Japan) Masataka Morizono / Yuya Oshima (final)
2. (South Korea) Jung Young-sik / Lee Sang-su (champions)
3. (Russia) Alexey Liventsov / Mikhail Paikov (semifinals)
4. (Chinese Taipei) Chuang Chih-yuan / Huang Sheng-sheng (quarterfinals)
5. (Hong Kong) Ho Kwan Kit / Tang Peng (semifinals)
6. (Japan) Koki Niwa / Maharu Yoshimura (quarterfinals)
7. (Belgium) Robin Devos / Cédric Nuytinck (quarterfinals)
8. (France) Antoine Hachard / Romain Ruiz (quarterfinals)

=== Draw ===
Quarterfinals
1 | (Japan) Morizono / Oshima | 11 | 11 | 11 | 11
8 | (France) Hachard / Ruiz | 6 | 6 | 6 | 8
5 | (Hong Kong) Ho / Tang | 10 | 11 | 11 | 11 | 3 | 7 | 11
4 | (Chinese Taipei) Chuang / Huang | 12 | 5 | 9 | 7 | 11 | 11 | 5
3 | (Russia) Liventsov / Paikov | 11 | 11 | 16 | 11
7 | (Belgium) Devos / Nuytinck | 7 | 7 | 14 | 9
6 | (Japan) Niwa / Yoshimura | 6 | 11 | 12 | 14 | 12 | 11 | 14
2 | (South Korea) Jung / Lee | 11 | 4 | 10 | 16 | 14 | 9 | 16

Semifinals
1 | (Japan) Morizono / Oshima | 7 | 11 | 11 | 11 | 11
5 | (Hong Kong) Ho / Tang | 11 | 5 | 7 | 4 | 9
3 | (Russia) Liventsov / Paikov | 11 | 10 | 12 | 4 | 9 | 12 | 7
2 | (South Korea) Jung / Lee | 8 | 12 | 10 | 11 | 11 | 10 | 11

Final
1 | (Japan) Morizono / Oshima | 11 | 11 | 10 | 9 | 7 | 4
2 | (South Korea) Jung / Lee | 5 | 2 | 12 | 11 | 11 | 11

== Women's doubles ==
=== Players ===
1. (South Korea) Jeon Ji-hee / Yang Ha-eun (semifinals)
2. (Japan) Honoka Hashimoto / Hitomi Sato (semifinals)
3. (Russia) Maria Dolgikh / Polina Mikhailova (quarterfinals)
4. (Chinese Taipei) Cheng I-ching / Huang Yi-hua (quarterfinals)
5. (Hong Kong) Doo Hoi Kem / Lee Ho Ching (final)
6. (Germany) Shan Xiaona / Petrissa Solja (quarterfinals)
7. (Japan) Yui Hamamoto / Hina Hayata (champions)
8. (Hungary) Dóra Madarász / Szandra Pergel (quarterfinals)

=== Draw ===
Quarterfinals
1 | (South Korea) Jeon / Yang | 11 | 11 | 12 | 11
8 | (Hungary) Madarász / Pergel | 6 | 4 | 10 | 6
5 | (Hong Kong) Doo / Lee | 11 | 11 | 11 | 5 | 9 | 9 | 11
4 | (Chinese Taipei) Cheng / Huang | 8 | 8 | 9 | 11 | 11 | 11 | 4
3 | (Russia) Dolgikh / Mikhailova | 7 | 11 | 9 | 7 | 7
7 | (Japan) Hamamoto / Hayata | 11 | 9 | 11 | 11 | 11
6 | (Germany) Shan / Solja | 10 | 6 | 13 | 7
2 | (Japan) Hashimoto / Sato | 12 | 11 | 15 | 11

Semifinals
1 | (South Korea) Jeon / Yang | 11 | 9 | 6 | 7
5 | (Hong Kong) Doo / Lee | 13 | 11 | 11 | 11
7 | (Japan) Hamamoto / Hayata | 8 | 12 | 11 | 11 | 12 | 11
2 | (Japan) Hashimoto / Sato | 11 | 10 | 13 | 5 | 10 | 6

Final
5 | (Hong Kong) Doo / Lee | 8 | 17 | 9 | 11 | 8 | 10
7 | (Japan) Hamamoto / Hayata | 11 | 15 | 11 | 9 | 11 | 12

== See also ==
- 2016 World Team Table Tennis Championships
- Table tennis at the 2016 Summer Olympics
