= Kuwait Open =

Kuwait Open may refer to:

- Kuwait PSA Cup, a men's squash tournament formerly known as the Kuwait Open
- Kuwait Open (table tennis), a table tennis tournament
