= 2017 World Table Tennis Championships – Men's doubles =

Men's doubles at the 2017 World Table Tennis Championships
- Venue: Messe Düsseldorf
- Location: Düsseldorf, Germany
- Dates: 29 May – 4 June
- Final score: 11–9, 16–14, 11–9, 6–11, 13–11

Medalists
gold medal	Fan Zhendong; Xu Xin	China
silver medal	Masataka Morizono; Yuya Oshima	Japan
bronze medal	Jung Young-sik; Lee Sang-su	South Korea
bronze medal	Koki Niwa; Maharu Yoshimura	Japan

The 2017 World Table Tennis Championships men's doubles was the 54th edition of the men's doubles championship.

Xu Xin and Zhang Jike were the defending champions but Zhang did not compete this year.

Fan Zhendong and Xu Xin defeated Masataka Morizono and Yuya Oshima 11–9, 16–14, 11–9, 6–11, 13–11 in the final to win the title.

== Seeds ==
Matches were best of 5 games in qualification and best of 7 games in the 64-player sized main draw.

1. (Japan) Masataka Morizono / (Japan) Yuya Oshima (final)
2. (Germany) Patrick Franziska / (Denmark) Jonathan Groth (third round)
3. (China) Fan Zhendong / (China) Xu Xin (champion)
4. (South Korea) Jung Young-sik / (South Korea) Lee Sang-su (semifinals)
5. (Brazil) Hugo Calderano / (Brazil) Gustavo Tsuboi (third round)
6. (Russia) Alexey Liventsov/ (Russia) Mikhail Paikov (first round)
7. (Hong Kong) Ho Kwan Kit / (Hong Kong) Wong Chun Ting (quarterfinals)
8. (Sweden) Kristian Karlsson / (Sweden) Mattias Karlsson (third round)
9. (Japan) Koki Niwa / (Japan) Maharu Yoshimura (semifinals)
10. (Belgium) Robin Devos / (Belgium) Cedric Nuytinck (second round)
11. (Germany) Ruwen Filus/ (Germany) Ricardo Walther (first round)
12. (Chinese Taipei) Chen Chien-an / (Chinese Taipei) Liao Cheng-ting (quarterfinals)
13. (South Korea) Jang Woo-jin/ (South Korea) Jeong Sang-eun (first round)
14. (Poland) Jakub Dyjas / (Poland) Daniel Górak (third round)
15. (Hong Kong) Jiang Tianyi / (Hong Kong) Lam Siu Hang (second round)
16. (India) Sharath Kamal / (India) Sathiyan Gnanasekaran (second round)
17. (Germany) Timo Boll / (China) Ma Long (third round)
18. (Hungary) Nándor Ecseki/ (Hungary) Ádám Szudi (first round)
19. (Nigeria) Quadri Aruna / (Nigeria) Segun Toriola (second round)
20. (France) Tristan Flore / (France) Emmanuel Lebesson (second round)
21. (Singapore) Gao Ning / (Singapore) Pang Xue Jie (third round)
22. (Iran) Nima Alamian / (Iran) Noshad Alamian (second round)
23. (Sweden) Pär Gerell / (Sweden) Anton Kallberg (second round)
24. (Argentina) Gaston Alto/ (Argentina) Horacio Cifuentes (first round)
25. (Czech Republic) Tomáš Konečný / (Czech Republic) Tomaš Polansky (first round)
26. (Egypt) El-sayed Lashin/ (Egypt) Ahmed Saleh (first round)
27. (Puerto Rico) Brian Afanador/ (Puerto Rico) Daniel González (first round)
28. (Romania) Cristian Pletea / (Romania) Hunor Szőcs (second round)
29. (Brazil) Eric Jouti/ (Brazil) Cazuo Matsumoto (second round)
30. (India) Harmeet Desai / (India) Soumyajit Ghosh (second round)
31. (Serbia) Aleksandar Karakašević / (Poland) Wang Zengyi (second round)
32. (Austria) Robert Gardos/ (Austria) Daniel Habesohn (first round)

== Draw ==
=== Key ===
- Q = Qualifier
- w/o = Walkover
- w/d = Withdraw
- r = Retired
- DQ = Disqualified

=== Finals ===
Semifinals								Final
1	(Japan) Masataka Morizono (Japan) Yuya Oshima	11	6	11	8	11	11
4	(South Korea) Jung Young-sik (South Korea) Lee Sang-su	3	11	8	11	3	6	1	(Japan) Masataka Morizono (Japan) Yuya Oshima	9	14	9	11	11
3	(China) Fan Zhendong (China) Xu Xin	11	11	11	11			3	(China) Fan Zhendong (China) Xu Xin	11	16	11	6	13
9	(Japan) Koki Niwa (Japan) Maharu Yoshimura	7	2	7	4

=== Top half ===
==== Section 1 ====
First round
1	(Japan) Morizono (Japan) Oshima	11	11	11	13
(Portugal) Freitas (Croatia) Gaćina	7	5	8	11
(Finland) Oláh (Spain) Robles	7	9	11	5	3
31	(Serbia) Karakašević (Poland) Wang	11	11	4	11	11
18	(Hungary) Ecseki (Hungary) Szudi	11	11	7	8	11	5	9
(Belgium) Allegro (Belgium) Lambiet	7	9	11	11	7	11	11
(North Korea) Choe (North Korea) Pak	11	15	8	7	4	7
15	(Hong Kong) Jiang (Hong Kong) Lam	6	13	11	11	11	11
12	(Chinese Taipei) Chen (Chinese Taipei) Liao	11	11	11	11
(Mexico) Madrid (Mexico) Villa	3	8	5	4
(Thailand) Tanviriyavechakul (Thailand) Wisutmaythangkoon	13	11	11	10	11
27	(Puerto Rico) Afanador (Puerto Rico) González	11	6	2	12	5
24	(Argentina) Alto (Argentina) Cifuentes	8	4	8	11
(England) McBeath (England) Walker	11	11	11	13
(France) Gauzy (France) Robinot	9	11	11	5	11	11
6	(Russia) Liventsov (Russia) Paikov	11	5	8	11	8	9

Second round
1	(Japan) Morizono (Japan) Oshima	11	8	11	8	11	11
31	(Serbia) Karakašević (Poland) Wang	8	11	4	11	6	5
(Belgium) Allegro (Belgium) Lambiet	9	11	11	6	11	11	11
15	(Hong Kong) Jiang (Hong Kong) Lam	11	7	4	11	13	9	7
12	(Chinese Taipei) Chen (Chinese Taipei) Liao	11	13	11	11
(Thailand) Tanviriyavechakul (Thailand) Wisutmaythangkoon	6	11	8	9
(England) McBeath (England) Walker	11	11	14	8	7	11
(France) Gauzy (France) Robinot	9	6	12	11	11	8

Third round
1	(Japan) Morizono (Japan) Oshima	11	6	11	11	12
(Belgium) Allegro (Belgium) Lambiet	2	11	5	5	10
12	(Chinese Taipei) Chen (Chinese Taipei) Liao	11	11	11	3	13	11
(England) McBeath (England) Walker	5	5	5	11	15	7

Quarterfinals
1	(Japan) Morizono (Japan) Oshima	11	11	12	8	13
12	(Chinese Taipei) Chen (Chinese Taipei) Liao	6	9	10	11	11

==== Section 2 ====
First round
5	(Brazil) Calderano (Brazil) Tsuboi	11	11	3	8	11	11
(Egypt) Assar (Egypt) El-Beiali	6	6	11	11	8	9
(Greece) Gionis (Greece) Papageorgiou	11	11	6	11	5	11
29	(Brazil) Jouti (Brazil) Matsumoto	1	8	11	13	11	13
22	(Iran) Ni. Alamian (Iran) No. Alamian	10	11	11	12	11
(Austria) Fegerl (Portugal) Monteiro	12	9	6	10	9
(Russia) Shibaev (Russia) Skachkov	11	5	11	11	11
13	(South Korea) Jang (South Korea) Jeong S:	6	11	9	8	9
11	(Germany) Filus (Germany) Walther	4	7	9	12	11	11	6
(Czech Republic) Jančařík (Czech Republic) Sirucek	11	11	11	10	6	8	11
(Saudi Arabia) Alkhadrawi (Saudi Arabia) Bu Shulaybi	5	6	7	5
21	(Singapore) Gao (Singapore) Pang	11	11	11	11
26	(Egypt) Lashin (Egypt) Saleh	9	11	7	11	11	8	7
(Italy) Rech (Italy) Stoyanov	11	9	11	6	6	11	11
(Turkey) Gündüz (Turkey) Yigenler	9	9	9	11	11	8
4	(South Korea) Jung Y. (South Korea) Lee	11	11	11	9	9	11

Second round
5	(Brazil) Calderano (Brazil) Tsuboi	11	5	11	11	9	11
29	(Brazil) Jouti (Brazil) Matsumoto	8	11	5	7	11	8
22	(Iran) Ni. Alamian (Iran) No. Alamian	11	10	8	5	11	7
(Russia) Shibaev (Russia) Skachkov	4	12	11	11	7	11
(Czech Republic) Jančařík (Czech Republic) Sirucek	11	9	8	10	9
21	(Singapore) Gao (Singapore) Pang	6	11	11	12	11
(Italy) Rech (Italy) Stoyanov	5	6	7	6
4	(South Korea) Jung Y. (South Korea) Lee	11	11	11	11

Third round
5	(Brazil) Calderano (Brazil) Tsuboi	6	9	7	11	11	9
(Russia) Shibaev (Russia) Skachkov	11	11	11	6	8	11
21	(Singapore) Gao (Singapore) Pang	10	11	12	11	3	9	6
4	(South Korea) Jung Y. (South Korea) Lee	12	8	10	9	11	11	11

Quarterfinals
(Russia) Shibaev (Russia) Skachkov	12	5	5	9	9
4	(South Korea) Jung Y. (South Korea) Lee	10	11	11	11	11

=== Bottom half ===
==== Section 3 ====
First round
3	(China) Fan (China) Xu	11	11	11	11
(Croatia) Kojić (Croatia) Pucar	8	7	4	5
(Kazakhstan) Gerassimenko (Ukraine) Kou	4	3	5	0
20	(France) Flore (France) Lebesson	11	11	11	11
17	(Germany) Boll (China) Ma	11	11	11	11
(Hungary) Lakatos (Hungary) Nagy	5	6	9	1
(England) Drinkhall (England) Pitchford	12	8	11	10	13	6
16	(India) Kamal (India) Gnanasekaran	10	11	9	12	15	11
14	(Poland) Dyjas (Poland) Górak	13	6	11	11	11
(Paraguay) Aguirre (Paraguay) Toranzos	11	11	8	9	8
(Chinese Taipei) Tin (Chinese Taipei) Sun	9	5	12	16	6	11	11
25	(Czech Republic) Konečný (Czech Republic) Polansky	11	11	10	14	11	5	5
30	(India) Desai (India) Ghosh	11	11	14	11
(Luxembourg) Glod (Luxembourg) Mladenovic	5	6	12	9
(Slovenia) Kozul (Slovenia) Zibrat	5	11	5	8	8
7	(Hong Kong) Ho (Hong Kong) Wong	11	8	11	11	11

Second round
3	(China) Fan (China) Xu	11	8	11	11	11
20	(France) Flore (France) Lebesson	4	11	7	8	8
17	(Germany) Boll (China) Ma	11	7	11	11	11
16	(India) Kamal (India) Gnanasekaran	8	11	5	4	8
14	(Poland) Dyjas (Poland) Górak	10	11	11	12	11
(Chinese Taipei) Tin (Chinese Taipei) Sun	12	8	8	10	9
30	(India) Desai (India) Ghosh	8	7	3	11	8
7	(Hong Kong) Ho (Hong Kong) Wong	11	11	11	6	11

Third round
3	(China) Fan (China) Xu	11	12	11	11	11
17	(Germany) Boll (China) Ma	13	10	8	9	8
14	(Poland) Dyjas (Poland) Górak	5	11	9	8	11	11	6
7	(Hong Kong) Ho (Hong Kong) Wong	11	8	11	11	9	5	11

Quarterfinals
3	(China) Fan (China) Xu	8	4	11	11	8	11	11
7	(Hong Kong) Ho (Hong Kong) Wong	11	11	2	4	11	1	5

==== Section 4 ====
First round
8	(Sweden) K. Karlsson (Sweden) M. Karlsson	11	11	5	12	11
(Slovenia) Jorgić (Slovenia) Tokič	9	5	11	10	9
(Malaysia) Leong (Malaysia) Haiqal	8	4	2	6
23	(Sweden) Gerell (Sweden) Kallberg	11	11	11	11
28	(Romania) Pletea (Romania) Szőcs	13	13	11	14	8	11
(Spain) Cantero (Spain) Machado	11	15	9	12	11	5
(Chile) Gómez (Chile) Lamadrid	4	4	8	6
9	(Japan) Niwa (Japan) Yoshimura	11	11	11	11
10	(Belgium) Devos (Belgium) Nuytinck	12	11	11	11
(Israel) Ben Ari (Israel) Simon	10	4	5	7
(Belarus) Platonov (Belarus) Samsonov	11	9	7	11	11	9	11
32	(Austria) Gardos (Austria) Habesohn	7	11	11	9	8	11	9
19	(Nigeria) Aruna (Nigeria) Toriola	11	9	11	10	11	11
(Bulgaria) Alexandrov (Bulgaria) Kodjabashev	9	11	4	12	7	1
(Romania) Crișan (Romania) Ionescu	12	11	5	8	9	11	13
2	(Germany) Franziska (Denmark) Groth	10	4	11	11	11	5	15

Second round
8	(Sweden) K. Karlsson (Sweden) M. Karlsson	11	10	11	11	17
23	(Sweden) Gerell (Sweden) Kallberg	4	12	7	7	15
28	(Romania) Pletea (Romania) Szőcs	8	9	10	11	4
9	(Japan) Niwa (Japan) Yoshimura	11	11	12	7	11
10	(Belgium) Devos (Belgium) Nuytinck	10	7	12	6	5
(Belarus) Platonov (Belarus) Samsonov	12	11	10	11	11
19	(Nigeria) Aruna (Nigeria) Toriola	11	12	10	3	7	8
2	(Germany) Franziska (Denmark) Groth	9	10	12	11	11	11

Third round
8	(Sweden) K. Karlsson (Sweden) M. Karlsson	5	11	9	8	11	11	6
9	(Japan) Niwa (Japan) Yoshimura	11	8	11	11	9	5	11
(Belarus) Platonov (Belarus) Samsonov	11	8	11	11	4	9	11
2	(Germany) Franziska (Denmark) Groth	8	11	7	5	11	11	7

Quarterfinals
9	(Japan) Niwa (Japan) Yoshimura	11	11	11	11
(Belarus) Platonov (Belarus) Samsonov	8	8	6	8
