= India Open (table tennis) =

Tournament information
- Founded: 2007
- Location: New Delhi (2017)
- Venue: Thyagaraj Sports Complex (2017)
- Draw: 32S / 16D
- Prize money: US$120,000 (2017)

Current champions (2017)
- Men's singles: (Germany) Dimitrij Ovtcharov
- Women's singles: (Japan) Sakura Mori
- Men's doubles: (Japan) Masataka Morizono (Japan) Yuya Oshima
- Women's doubles: (Japan) Sakura Mori (Hungary) Georgina Póta

The India Open is a table tennis tournament held in India. It featured on the ITTF World Tour schedule in 2017.

== History ==
The India Open was first included on the ITTF Pro Tour schedule in 2007, and featured again in 2009 and 2010.

In August 2016 it was announced that the India Open would make its return as part of the revamped ITTF World Tour schedule in 2017. This was the first time the event had been included on the tour since it was rebranded as the ITTF World Tour in 2012. In May 2017, the India Open was not included on the schedule announced for the 2018 tour.

Germany's Dimitrij Ovtcharov is the most successful player in the tournament's history, having won the men's singles title in 2010 and 2017.

== Champions ==
=== ITTF Pro Tour, 2007–2010 ===
Year	Location	Men's singles	Women's singles	Men's doubles	Women's doubles	Ref.
2007	New Delhi	(Singapore) Gao Ning	(Singapore) Sun Beibei	(Singapore) Gao Ning (Singapore) Yang Zi	(Singapore) Sun Beibei (Singapore) Yu Mengyu	
2009	Indore	(Singapore) Ma Liang	(Singapore) Yu Mengyu	(Singapore) Gao Ning (Singapore) Yang Zi	(Malaysia) Beh Lee Wei (Malaysia) Ng Sock Khim	
2010	New Delhi	(Germany) Dimitrij Ovtcharov	(Japan) Sayaka Hirano	(South Korea) Lee Sang-su (South Korea) Seo Hyun-deok	(Chinese Taipei) Cheng I-ching (Chinese Taipei) Huang Yi-hua	

=== ITTF World Tour, 2017 ===
Year	Location	Men's singles	Women's singles	Men's doubles	Women's doubles	Ref.
2017	New Delhi	(Germany) Dimitrij Ovtcharov	(Japan) Sakura Mori	(Japan) Masataka Morizono (Japan) Yuya Oshima	(Sweden) Matilda Ekholm (Hungary) Georgina Póta	

== See also ==
- Asian Table Tennis Union
