= 2016 World Team Table Tennis Championships =

2016 edition of the World Team Table Tennis Championships

- Venue: Malawati Stadium
- Location: Shah Alam, Malaysia
- Dates: 28 February–6 March
- Nations: 94

Champions
- Men: China
- Women: China

The 2016 World Team Table Tennis Championships was held in Shah Alam, Selangor, Malaysia from 28 February to 6 March 2016.

== Seeding ==
The top sixteen teams of the first division and the top two teams of the second division at the 2014 World Team Championships were guaranteed a place in the first division, along with the top six placed teams in the world rankings not already qualified.

Qualification	Men's team	Women's team
Top sixteen in 2014	China; Germany; Chinese Taipei; Japan; Austria; South Korea; Portugal; Singapore Greece; Croatia; Poland; Sweden; France; Russia; Ukraine; North Korea	China; Japan; Singapore; Hong Kong; North Korea; Romania; Germany; Netherlands Ukraine; South Korea; Belarus; Chinese Taipei; Hungary; Poland; Czech Republic; Austria
Top two of the 2nd Division in 2014	England; Italy	Brazil; Sweden
ITTF World Team Ranking	Hong Kong; Belarus; Denmark; Czech Republic; Romania; Malaysia	Russia; Spain; Thailand; France; United States; Malaysia

== Schedule ==
Five individual events were contested. Qualification rounds were held from 26–27 April.

Rounds in Main Draw
Finals

Date	28 February	29 February	1 March	2 March	3 March	4 March	5 March	6 March
Men's team	GS	GS	GS	GS	1/8 final	QF	SF	F
Women's team	GS	GS	GS	GS	1/8 final, QF	QF, SF	SF	F

== Medal summary ==
=== Medal table ===
Rank	Nation	Gold	Silver	Bronze	Total
1	China (CHN)	2	0	0	2
2	Japan (JPN)	0	2	0	2
3	Chinese Taipei (TPE)	0	0	1	1
3	England (ENG)	0	0	1	1
3	North Korea (PRK)	0	0	1	1
3	South Korea (KOR)	0	0	1	1
Totals (6 entries)		2	2	4	8

=== Medalists ===
Event	Gold	Silver	Bronze
Men's team	China; Fan Zhendong; Fang Bo; Ma Long; Xu Xin; Zhang Jike	Japan; Kenta Matsudaira; Jun Mizutani; Koki Niwa; Yuya Oshima; Maharu Yoshimura	South Korea; Jang Woo-jin; Jeong Sang-eun; Joo Sae-hyuk; Jung Young-sik; Lee Sang-su
Men's team	China; Fan Zhendong; Fang Bo; Ma Long; Xu Xin; Zhang Jike	Japan; Kenta Matsudaira; Jun Mizutani; Koki Niwa; Yuya Oshima; Maharu Yoshimura	England; Alan Cooke (coach); Paul Drinkhall; Liam Pitchford; Sam Walker
Women's team	China; Chen Meng; Ding Ning; Li Xiaoxia; Liu Shiwen; Zhu Yuling	Japan; Ai Fukuhara; Yui Hamamoto; Kasumi Ishikawa; Mima Ito; Misako Wakamiya	North Korea; Cha Hyo-sim; Kim Song-i; Ri Mi-gyong; Ri Myong-sun
Women's team	China; Chen Meng; Ding Ning; Li Xiaoxia; Liu Shiwen; Zhu Yuling	Japan; Ai Fukuhara; Yui Hamamoto; Kasumi Ishikawa; Mima Ito; Misako Wakamiya	Chinese Taipei; Chen Szu-yu; Cheng Hsien-tzu; Cheng I-ching; Lin Chia-hui; Liu Hsing-yin

== Results ==
=== Men's team ===
Round of 16
Croatia	0
Sweden	3
North Korea	0
Portugal	3
Austria	1
Hong Kong	3
Poland	2
England	3

Quarterfinals
China	3
Sweden	0
Portugal	1
South Korea	3
Japan	3
Hong Kong	1
England	3
France	2

Semifinals
China	3
South Korea	0
Japan	3
England	1

Final
China	3
Japan	0

=== Women's team ===
Round of 16
Austria	2
Netherlands	3
Chinese Taipei	3
Ukraine	2
Romania	0
North Korea	3
South Korea	0
Germany	3

Quarterfinals
China	3
Netherlands	0
Chinese Taipei	3
Hong Kong	2
Singapore	2
North Korea	3
Germany	0
Japan	3

Semifinals
China	3
Chinese Taipei	0
North Korea	1
Japan	3

Final
China	3
Japan	0

== See also ==
- 2016 ITTF World Tour
- 2016 ITTF World Tour Grand Finals
- Table tennis at the 2016 Summer Olympics
