= Qatar Open (table tennis) =

Tournament information
- Event name: Qatar Open
- Tour: ITTF World Tour
- Founded: 1994
- Location: Doha
- Venue: Ali Bin Hamad al-Attiyah Arena (since 2016)
- Category: World Tour Platinum
- Draw: 32S / 16D
- Prize money: US$235,000 (2018)

The Qatar Open is an annual table tennis tournament in Doha, Qatar, run by the International Table Tennis Federation (ITTF). It is currently part of the ITTF World Tour.

== History ==
The tournament was first held in 1994, and has featured on the ITTF World Tour's schedule every year since 2005, and previously from 1997–99 and 2001-03.

Ma Long of China holds the record for most men's singles tournament wins, with four, while Zhang Yining of China holds the record for most women's singles tournament wins, also with four.

In August 2016, it was announced by the ITTF that Doha has been chosen as one of six cities to host a "World Tour Platinum" event in 2017. These events will replace the Super Series as the top tier of the ITTF World Tour.

== Champions ==
=== 1994–2018 ===
Year	Men's singles	Women's singles	Men's doubles	Women's doubles
1994	(South Korea) Kim Taek-soo			
1996	(Belgium) Jean-Michel Saive			
1997	(Sweden) Jan-Ove Waldner		(Japan) Koji Matsushita (Japan) Hiroshi Shibutani	
1998	(Croatia) Zoran Primorac	(China) Li Ju	(China) Wang Liqin (China) Yan Sen	(China) Li Ju (China) Wang Nan
1999	(Croatia) Zoran Primorac	(Germany) Jing Tian-Zörner	(Chinese Taipei) Chang Yen-shu (Chinese Taipei) Chiang Peng-lung	(Hungary) Csilla Bátorfi (Hungary) Krisztina Tóth
2001	(Croatia) Zoran Primorac	(North Korea) Kim Hyon-hui	(Chinese Taipei) Chang Yen-shu (Chinese Taipei) Chiang Peng-lung	(South Korea) Kim Moo-kyo (South Korea) Ryu Ji-hae
2002	(Belgium) Jean-Michel Saive	(China) Wang Nan	(China) Wang Liqin (China) Yan Sen	(China) Li Jia (China) Niu Jianfeng
2003	(Belarus) Vladimir Samsonov	(Croatia) Tamara Boros	(Greece) Kalinikos Kreanga (Germany) Jörg Roßkopf	(Belarus) Tatyana Logatzkaya (Belarus) Veronika Pavlovich
2005	(China) Wang Liqin	(China) Zhang Yining	(China) Kong Linghui (China) Wang Hao	(China) Guo Yue (China) Niu Jianfeng
2006	(China) Wang Liqin	(China) Zhang Yining	(China) Wang Hao (China) Wang Liqin	(China) Wang Nan (China) Zhang Yining
2007	(China) Ma Lin	(China) Li Xiaoxia	(South Korea) Cho Eon-rae (South Korea) Lee Jung-woo	(China) Li Xiaoxia (China) Wang Nan
2008	(China) Ma Lin	(China) Zhang Yining	(China) Chen Qi (China) Ma Lin	(China) Guo Yue (China) Zhang Yining
2009	(Germany) Timo Boll	(China) Zhang Yining	(China) Ma Long (China) Xu Xin	(China) Guo Yue (China) Zhang Yining
2010	(China) Wang Liqin	(China) Guo Yue	(China) Ma Lin (China) Wang Hao	(China) Ding Ning (China) Liu Shiwen
2011	(China) Xu Xin	(China) Liu Shiwen	(China) Wang Liqin (China) Xu Xin	(China) Guo Yue (China) Li Xiaoxia
2012	(China) Xu Xin	(China) Chen Meng	(China) Ma Lin (China) Xu Xin	(China) Li Xiaodan (China) Wen Jia
2013	(China) Ma Long	(China) Ding Ning	(China) Wang Hao (China) Yan An	(China) Ding Ning (China) Li Xiaoxia
2014	(China) Xu Xin	(China) Hu Limei	(South Korea) Cho Eon-rae (South Korea) Joo Sae-hyuk	(Hong Kong) Lee Ho Ching (Hong Kong) Ng Wing Nam
2015	(Belarus) Vladimir Samsonov	(Romania) Elizabeta Samara	(Portugal) Marcos Freitas (Croatia) Andrej Gaćina	(Hong Kong) Jiang Huajun (Hong Kong) Tie Ya Na
2016	(China) Ma Long	(China) Liu Shiwen	(China) Fan Zhendong (China) Zhang Jike	(China) Ding Ning (China) Liu Shiwen
2017	(China) Ma Long	(China) Chen Meng	(Japan) Masataka Morizono (Japan) Yuya Oshima	(China) Chen Meng (China) Wang Manyu
2018	(China) Fan Zhendong	(China) Liu Shiwen	(China) Fan Zhendong (China) Xu Xin	(China) Chen Ke (China) Wang Manyu

=== 2019–present ===
Year	Men's singles	Women's singles	Men's doubles	Women's doubles	Mixed doubles
2019	(China) Ma Long	(China) Wang Manyu	(Hong Kong) Ho Kwan Kit (Hong Kong) Wong Chun Ting	(China) Sun Yingsha (China) Wang Manyu	(China) Xu Xin (China) Liu Shiwen
2020	(China) Fan Zhendong	(China) Chen Meng	(China) Ma Long (China) Xu Xin	(China) Wang Manyu (China) Zhu Yuling	(Japan) Jun Mizutani (Japan) Mima Ito

== See also ==
- Asian Table Tennis Union
