= Maharu Yoshimura =

Japanese table tennis player

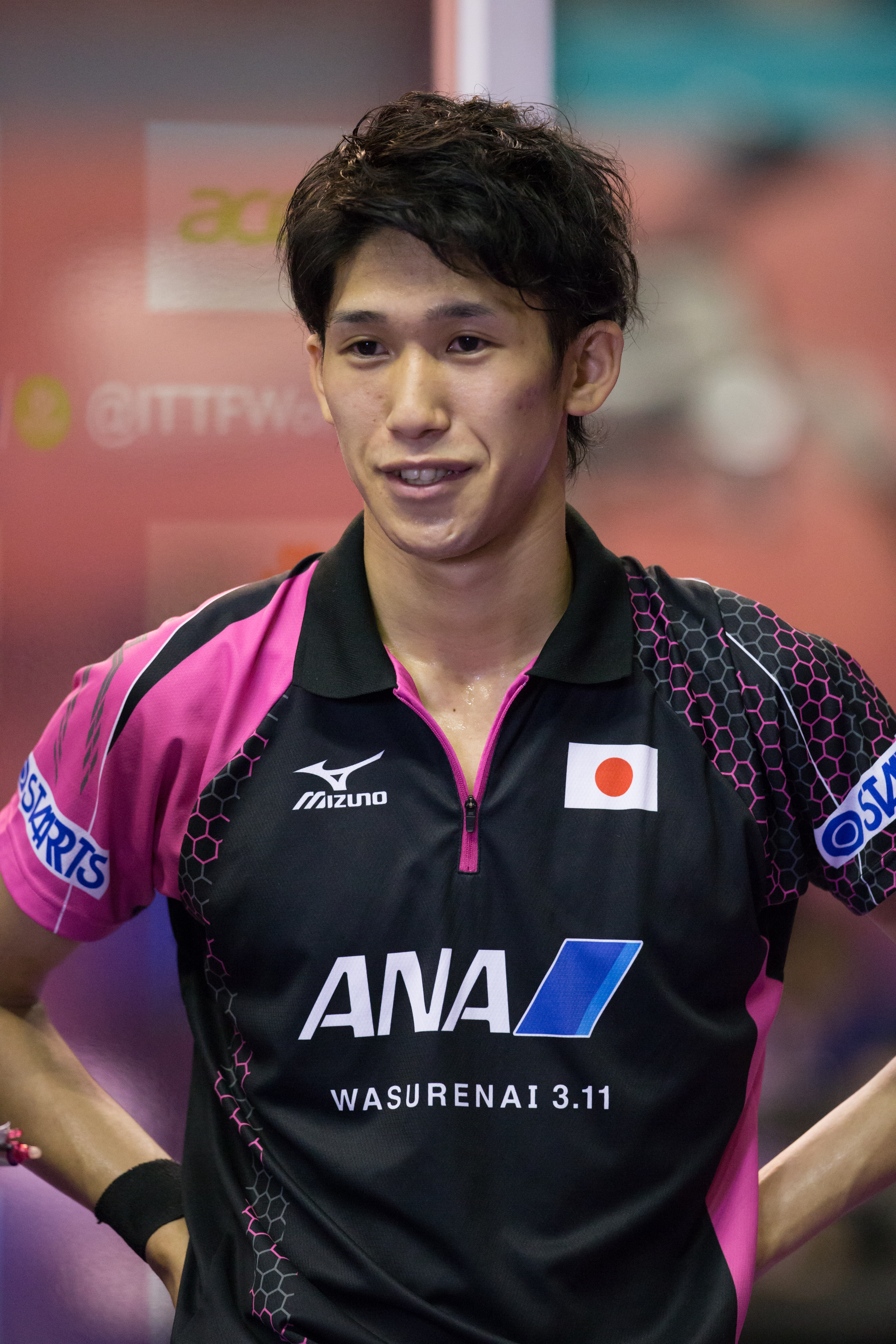
- Yoshimura Maharu at the 2016 World Team Table Tennis Championships

Personal information
- Nationality: Japanese
- Born: 3 August 1993 (age 33) Ibaraki Prefecture, Japan
- Height: 1.77 m (5 ft 10 in)
- Weight: 61 kg (134 lb)

Sport
- Sport: Table tennis
- Playing style: right-handed, shakehand grip
- Equipment: Butterfly Custon (ZL Carbon), Butterfly Tenergy 05 (BH, FH)
- Highest ranking: 15 (May 2016)
- Current ranking: 42 (5 October 2026)
Medal record
Men's table tennis
Representing Japan
Event	1st	2nd	3rd
Olympic Games	0	1	0
World Championships	1	4	2
World Cup	0	0	1
ITTF World Tour Grand Finals	0	0	1
Asian Cup	0	1	0
Asian Championships	0	1	5
World Junior Championships	0	0	2
Asian Junior Championships	1	1	0
Total	2	8	11
Olympic Games
Silver medal – second place	2016 Rio de Janeiro	Team
World Championships
Gold medal – first place	2017 Düsseldorf	Mixed doubles
Silver medal – second place	2015 Suzhou	Mixed doubles
Silver medal – second place	2016 Kuala Lumpur	Team
Silver medal – second place	2019 Budapest	Mixed doubles
Silver medal – second place	2025 Doha	Mixed doubles
Bronze medal – third place	2012 Dortmund	Team
Bronze medal – third place	2017 Düsseldorf	Doubles
World Cup
Bronze medal – third place	2019 Tokyo	Team
ITTF World Tour Grand Finals
Bronze medal – third place	2017 Astana	Doubles
Asian Cup
Silver medal – second place	2012 Guangzhou	Singles
Asian Championships
Silver medal – second place	2015 Pattaya	Team
Bronze medal – third place	2015 Pattaya	Doubles
Bronze medal – third place	2017 Wuxi	Doubles
Bronze medal – third place	2017 Wuxi	Team
Bronze medal – third place	2019 Yogyakarta	Doubles
Bronze medal – third place	2019 Yogyakarta	Team
World Junior Championships
Bronze medal – third place	2011 Manama	Singles
Bronze medal – third place	2011 Manama	Doubles
Asian Junior Championships
Gold medal – first place	2011 New Delhi	Singles
Silver medal – second place	2011 New Delhi	Doubles

Maharu Yoshimura (吉村 真晴, Yoshimura Maharu; born 3 August 1993) is a Japanese table tennis player.

== Life and career ==
=== 1993–2010: Early life and background ===
Yoshimura was born in Ibaraki Prefecture to a Filipina mother and a Japanese father. He has two younger brothers, Kazuhiro and Tomohisa, who are also table tennis players. His first name is a Japanese transliteration of the Tagalog word "Mahal", meaning "beloved".

=== 2011–present ===
In 2011, while in junior high school, he competed in the February Table Tennis Tournament Japan where he advanced to the top 12. He defeated Kazuhiro Zhang in the semi-finals but lost to Jun Mizutani in the final game. His achievements include the Asian Championships (New Delhi, India; the first victory of a Japanese player in the men's singles) and the All Japan Table Tennis Championships. At the 2015 World Table Tennis Championships, Yoshimura won a silver medal in the mixed doubles event with Kasumi Ishikawa. In 2016, he competed in the 2016 Summer Olympics and won a silver medal in the men's team event with Jun Mizutani and Koki Niwa. At the 2017 World Table Tennis Championships, Yoshimura won a gold medal in the mixed doubles event with Kasumi Ishikawa.

== Career records ==
- Japan Top 12 Table Tennis Tournament (2011)
  - Men's singles runner-up
- World Junior Table Tennis Championships (2011)
  - 3rd in men's singles
  - 3rd in men's doubles
- Interscholastic athletic competition (2011)
  - Men's doubles winner
  - 3rd in men's singles table tennis
- Asian Junior Table Tennis Championships (2011)
  - Men's doubles runner up
  - Won men's singles
- All Japan Table Tennis Championships (2012)
  - Won the men's singles
- Japan Open (2015)
  - Men's singles runner-up

== In popular culture ==
Maharu Yoshimura had a minor role in the 2017 film Mixed Doubles.

In a 2016 segment of the Japanese variety show Ningen Kansatsu Variety Monitoring (ニンゲン観察バラエティ モニタリング), Yoshimura and Koki Niwa disguised themselves as two old men and proceeded to shock normal folks in table tennis.
