= Kuwait Open (table tennis) =

Tournament information
- Event name: Kuwait Open
- Founded: 2006
- Location: Kuwait City
- Venue: Salwa Sports Club (2014-2016)
- Draw: 32S / 16D
- Prize money: US$300,000 (2016)

The Kuwait Open was a table tennis tournament held annually in Kuwait by the International Table Tennis Federation (ITTF). It featured regularly on the ITTF World Tour calendar from 2006 to 2016.

== History ==
The tournament was first held in 2006, and has featured on the ITTF World Tour's schedule every year since then, with the exception of 2011 when the country was temporarily suspended due to a recommendation from the International Olympic Committee.

China's Ma Long holds the record for most men's singles tournament wins, with three, while Liu Shiwen and Li Xiaoxia of China jointly hold the record for most women's singles tournament wins, with two each.

In August 2016, Kuwait was not included on the 2017 World Tour schedule announced by the ITTF.

== Champions ==
Year	Men's singles	Women's singles	Men's doubles	Women's doubles
2006	(China) Ma Lin	(Hong Kong) Jiang Huajun	(China) Chen Qi (China) Ma Lin	(China) Wang Nan (China) Zhang Yining
2007	(China) Ma Long	(China) Guo Yue	(South Korea) Lee Jin-kwon (South Korea) Ryu Seung-min	(China) Li Xiaoxia (China) Zhang Yining
2008	(Belarus) Vladimir Samsonov	(China) Zhang Yining	(China) Ma Lin (China) Wang Hao	(China) Wang Nan (China) Zhang Yining
2009	(China) Ma Long	(China) Ding Ning	(China) Chen Qi (China) Ma Lin	(China) Guo Yue (China) Zhang Yining
2010	(China) Xu Xin	(China) Liu Shiwen	(China) Ma Long (China) Zhang Jike	(China) Guo Yan (China) Guo Yue
2012	(Japan) Jun Mizutani	(China) Feng Yalan	(Singapore) Gao Ning (Singapore) Li Hu	(China) Chen Meng (China) Zhu Yuling
2013	(China) Zhang Jike	(China) Liu Shiwen	(China) Xu Xin (China) Yan An	(China) Ding Ning (China) Li Xiaoxia
2014	(China) Fan Zhendong	(China) Zhu Yuling	(Austria) Stefan Fegerl (China) Lin Gaoyuan	(China) Liu Shiwen (China) Mu Zi
2015	(China) Ma Long	(China) Li Xiaoxia	(Chinese Taipei) Chiang Hung-chieh (Chinese Taipei) Huang Sheng-sheng	(China) Ding Ning (China) Zhu Yuling
2016	(China) Zhang Jike	(China) Li Xiaoxia	(China) Xu Xin (China) Zhang Jike	(China) Ding Ning (China) Liu Shiwen

== See also ==
- Asian Table Tennis Union
