= Yuya Oshima =

Japanese table tennis player

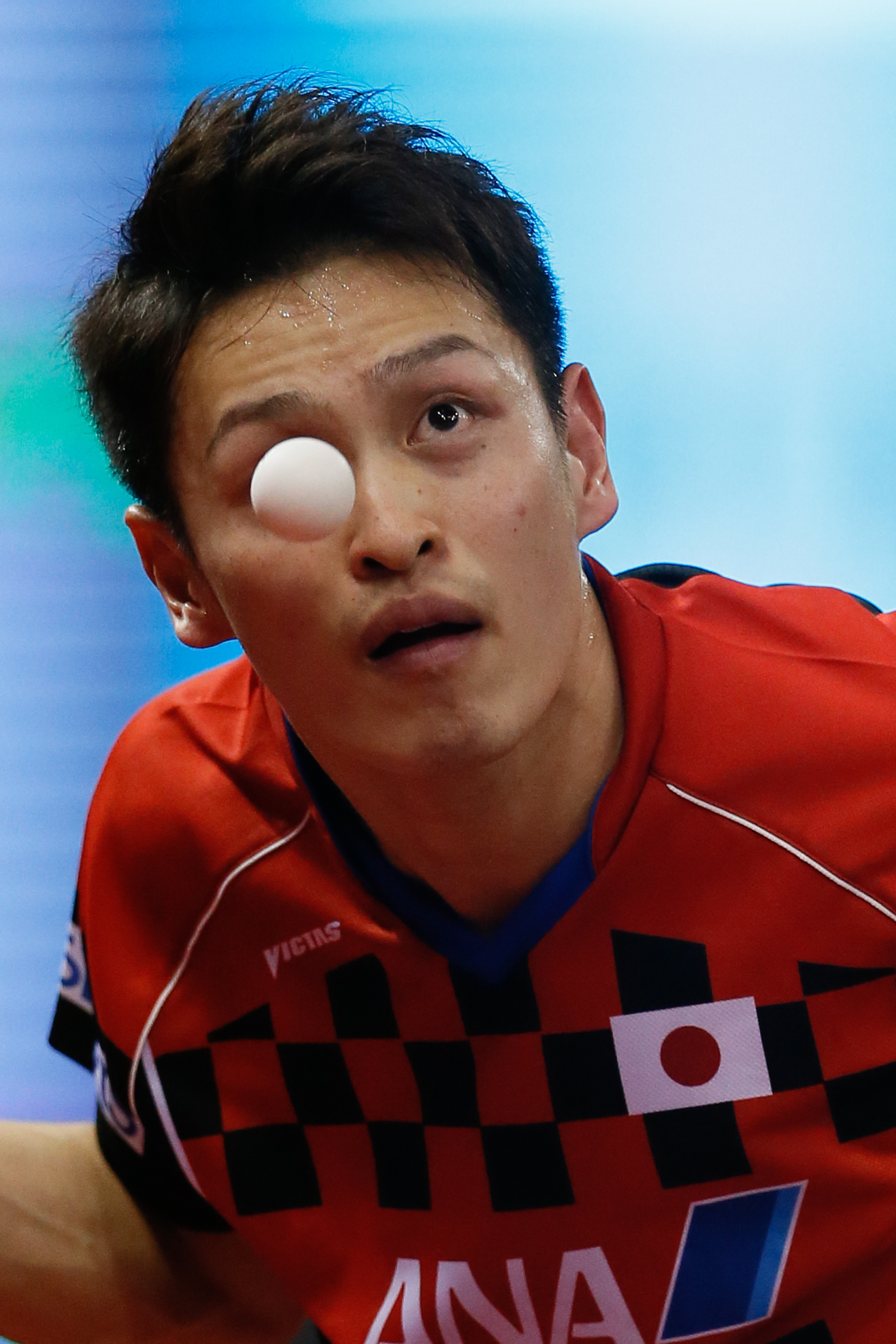

Personal information
- Born: 5 March 1994 (age 32) Kyoto, Japan
- Height: 1.68 m (5 ft 6 in)
- Weight: 64 kg (141 lb)

Sport
- Sport: Table tennis
- Club: Kinoshita Meister Tokyo
- Playing style: Right-handed, shakehand grip
- Highest ranking: 17 (August 2017)
- Current ranking: 29 (April 2018)
Medal record
Representing Japan
World Championships
Silver medal – second place	2016 Kuala Lumpur	Team
Silver medal – second place	2017 Düsseldorf	Doubles
World Cup
Silver medal – second place	2018 London	Team
ITTF World Tour Grand Finals
Gold medal – first place	2015 Lisbon	Doubles
Gold medal – first place	2017 Astana	Doubles
Silver medal – second place	2016 Doha	Doubles
Asian Championships
Silver medal – second place	2015 Pattaya	Team
Bronze medal – third place	2015 Pattaya	Doubles
Bronze medal – third place	2015 Pattaya	Mixed doubles
Bronze medal – third place	2017 Wuxi	Team
Summer Universiade
Gold medal – first place	2017 New Taipei City	Doubles
Silver medal – second place	2015 Gwangju	Singles
Silver medal – second place	2015 Gwangju	Doubles
Silver medal – second place	2015 Gwangju	Team
Silver medal – second place	2017 New Taipei City	Team

Yuya Oshima (大島 祐哉, Ōshima Yūya; born 5 March 1994) is a Japanese table tennis player. With doubles partner Masataka Morizono, he won the gold medal in the men's doubles event at both the 2015 and 2017 ITTF World Tour Grand Finals, as well as winning a silver medal in men's doubles at the 2017 World Championships.

== Major League Table Tennis ==
In May 2025, Oshima was selected by the Atlanta Blazers with the first overall pick in the 2025 MLTT Draft. He joined the team for the 2025–2026 season following the league's expansion to ten franchises.

Oshima debuted during the second week of the 2025–2026 season. In his first three matches, he recorded a 7–2 singles record, including matches against Enzo Angles and Koki Niwa. By January 2026, Oshima held a 16–11 singles record, a 59.3% winning percentage, and was ranked 17th in the league standings. During the season, he also competed for Ryukyu Asteeda in the Japanese T.League.

== Career records ==
The following senior career records stand as of April 2018:

=== Singles ===
- ITTF World Tour Grand Finals: QF (2015); Last 16 (2016, 2017)
- ITTF World Tour
  - Winner: 2015 Philippines Open, 2016 Swedish Open
- Asian Championships: Last 16 (2015, 2017)
- Summer Universiade: Runner-up (2015)

=== Men's doubles ===
- World Championships: Runner-up (2017); QF (2015)
- ITTF World Tour Grand Finals: Winner (2015, 2017); Runner-up (2016)
- ITTF World Tour
  - Winner: 2014 Czech Open, 2015 Croatia Open, 2016 German Open, 2016 Polish Open, 2017 India Open, 2017 Qatar Open
  - Runner-up: 2018 Qatar Open
- Asian Championships: SF (2015); QF (2017)
- Summer Universiade: Winner (2017); Runner-up (2015)

=== Mixed doubles ===
- Asian Championships: SF (2015)

=== Team events ===
- World Team Championships: Runner-up (2016); QF (2018)
- World Team Cup: Runner-up (2018); QF (2015)
- Asian Championships: Runner-up (2015); SF (2017)
- Summer Universiade: Runner-up (2015, 2017)
