= Jeoung Young-sik =

South Korean table tennis player

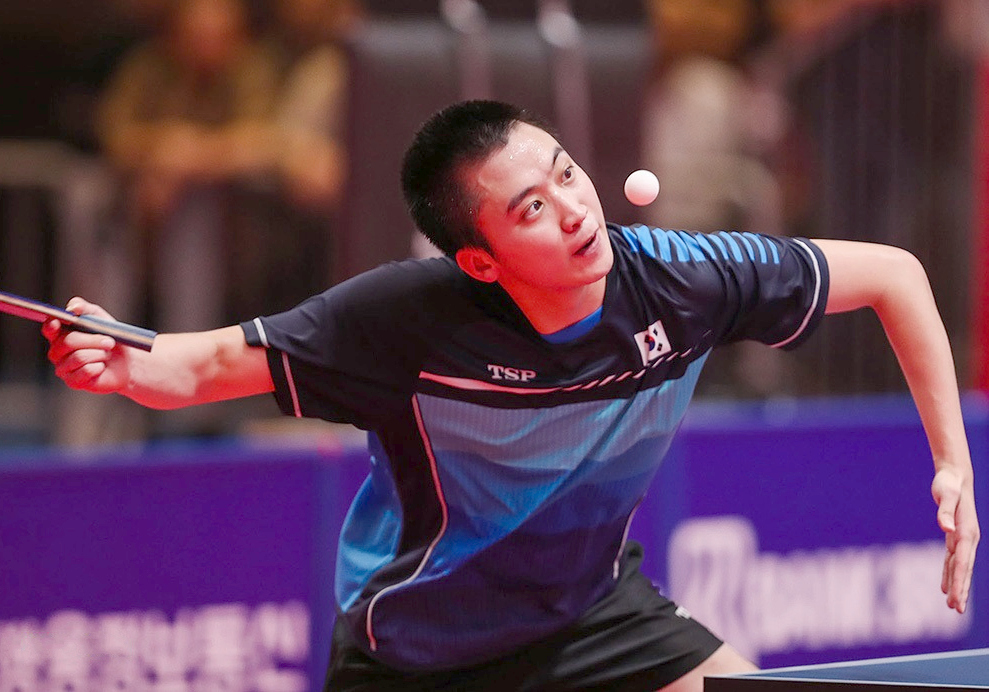
- Jeoung at the 2018 Asian Games

Personal information
- Nationality: Korean
- Born: 20 January 1992 (age 34)
- Height: 1.80 m (5 ft 11 in)

Sport
- Sport: Table tennis
- Playing style: Attack, shakehand
- Equipment: Blade: Icecream Azx
- Highest ranking: 7 (February 2017)
Medal record
Representing South Korea
World Championships
Bronze medal – third place	2010 Moscow	Team
Bronze medal – third place	2011 Rotterdam	Doubles
Bronze medal – third place	2012 Dortmund	Team
Bronze medal – third place	2016 Kuala Lumpur	Team
Bronze medal – third place	2017 Düsseldorf	Doubles
Bronze medal – third place	2018 Halmstad	Team
World Cup
Bronze medal – third place	2018 London	Team
Asian Games
Silver medal – second place	2010 Guangzhou	Team
Silver medal – second place	2018 Jakarta	Men's team
Bronze medal – third place	2010 Guangzhou	Doubles
Asian Championships
Silver medal – second place	2012 Macau	Doubles
Bronze medal – third place	2012 Macau	Team
Bronze medal – third place	2013 Busan	Team

Jeoung Young-sik (also Jeong or Jung, Korean: 정영식, born 20 January 1992) is a South Korean table tennis player. He debuted internationally in 2010 and won a silver and a bronze medal at the Asian Games. Between 2010 and 2018 he won six bronze medals at the world championships. He reached the world ranking #7 in February 2017. His father Jeoung Hae-chul was also a competitive table tennis player.

== Career ==
=== 2021 ===
Jeoung completed his mandatory military service from mid-2019 to March 2021. He will be representing South Korea at the Tokyo Olympics in the team event as well as the men's singles event.

Jeoung upset Timo Boll in the round of 16 to reach the quarter-finals of the Tokyo Olympics, where he lost to Fan Zhendong.

Following the Olympics, Jeoung withdrew from the Korean National Team for the remainder of 2021, including the World Championships in November. The stated reason was to allow more opportunities for his younger teammates.
