= Masataka Morizono =

Japanese table tennis player

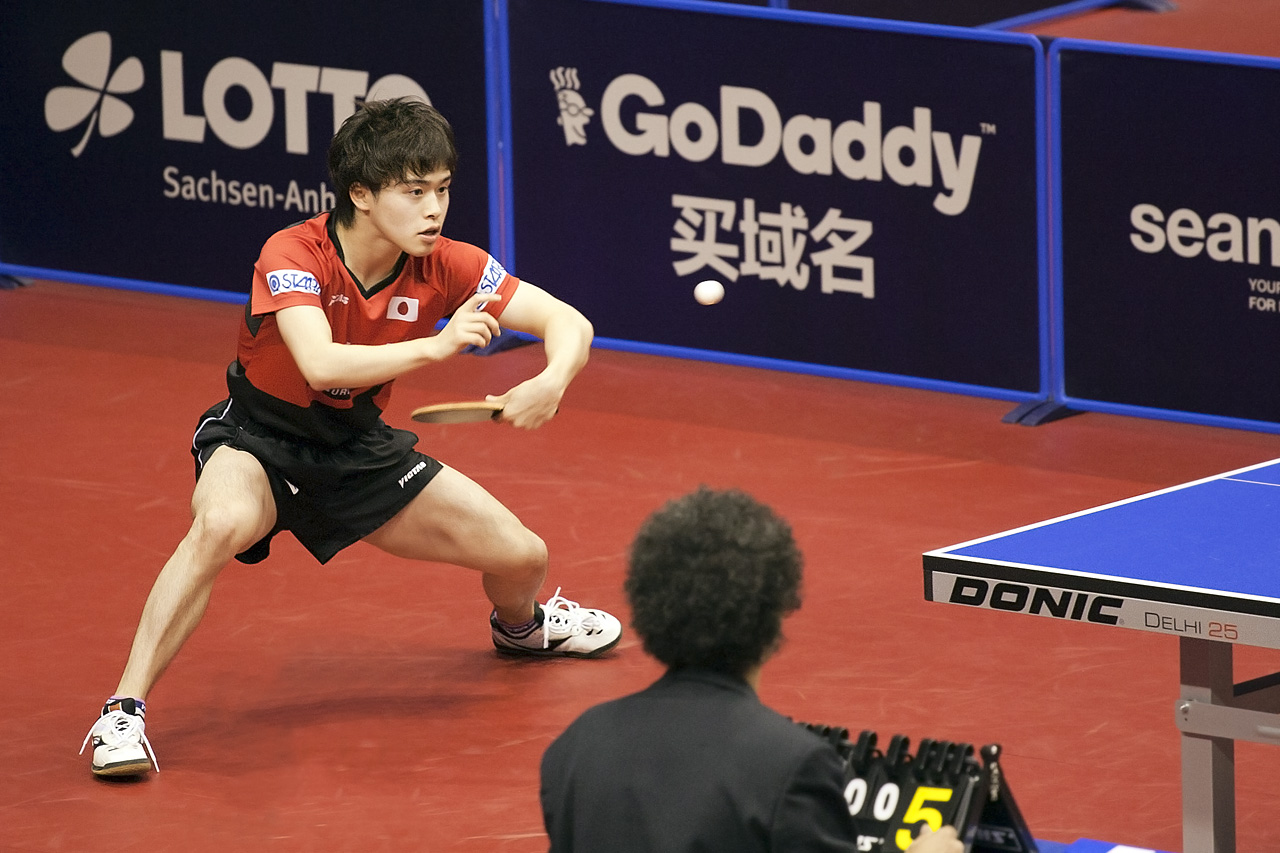
- Morizono at the 2017 German Open

Personal information
- Nationality: Japan
- Born: 5 April 1995 (age 31) Tokyo, Japan

Sport
- Sport: Table tennis
- Playing style: Left-handed, shakehand grip
- Highest ranking: 21 (August 2015)
- Current ranking: 50 (April 2018)
Medal record
World Championships
Silver medal – second place	2017 Düsseldorf	Doubles
ITTF World Tour Grand Finals
Gold medal – first place	2015 Lisbon	Doubles
Gold medal – first place	2017 Astana	Doubles
Silver medal – second place	2016 Doha	Doubles
Asian Championships
Silver medal – second place	2015 Pattaya	Team
Silver medal – second place	2017 Wuxi	Mixed doubles
Bronze medal – third place	2015 Pattaya	Doubles
Summer Universiade
Gold medal – first place	2015 Gwangju	Singles
Gold medal – first place	2017 New Taipei City	Singles
Gold medal – first place	2017 New Taipei City	Doubles
Silver medal – second place	2015 Gwangju	Doubles
Silver medal – second place	2015 Gwangju	Team
Silver medal – second place	2017 New Taipei City	Team
World Junior Championships
Silver medal – second place	2013 Rabat	Team
Bronze medal – third place	2013 Rabat	Singles
Asian Junior Championships
Bronze medal – third place	2013 Doha	Singles
Bronze medal – third place	2013 Doha	Team

Masataka Morizono (森薗 政崇, Morizono Masataka; born 5 April 1995) is a Japanese table tennis player. With doubles partner Yuya Oshima, he won the gold medal in the men's doubles event at both the 2015 and 2017 ITTF World Tour Grand Finals, as well as winning a silver medal in men's doubles at the 2017 World Championships.

== Career records ==
The following senior career records stand as of April 2018:

=== Singles ===
- ITTF World Tour
  - Runner-up: 2014 Spanish Open
- Asian Championships: Last 32 (2015)
- Summer Universiade: Winner (2015, 2017)

=== Men's doubles ===
- World Championships: Runner-up (2017); QF (2015)
- ITTF World Tour Grand Finals: Winner (2015, 2017); Runner-up (2016)
- ITTF World Tour
  - Winner: 2014 Czech Open, 2015 Croatia Open, 2016 German Open, 2016 Polish Open, 2017 India Open, 2017 Qatar Open
  - Runner-up: 2013 Polish Open
- Asian Championships: SF (2015); QF (2017)
- Summer Universiade: Winner (2017); Runner-up (2015)

=== Mixed doubles ===
- Asian Championships: Runner-up (2017); QF (2015)
- Summer Universiade: QF (2015)

=== Team ===
- World Team Cup: QF (2015)
- Asian Championships: Runner-up (2015)
- Summer Universiade: Runner-up (2015, 2017)
