= Ho Kwan-kit =

Hong Kong table tennis player

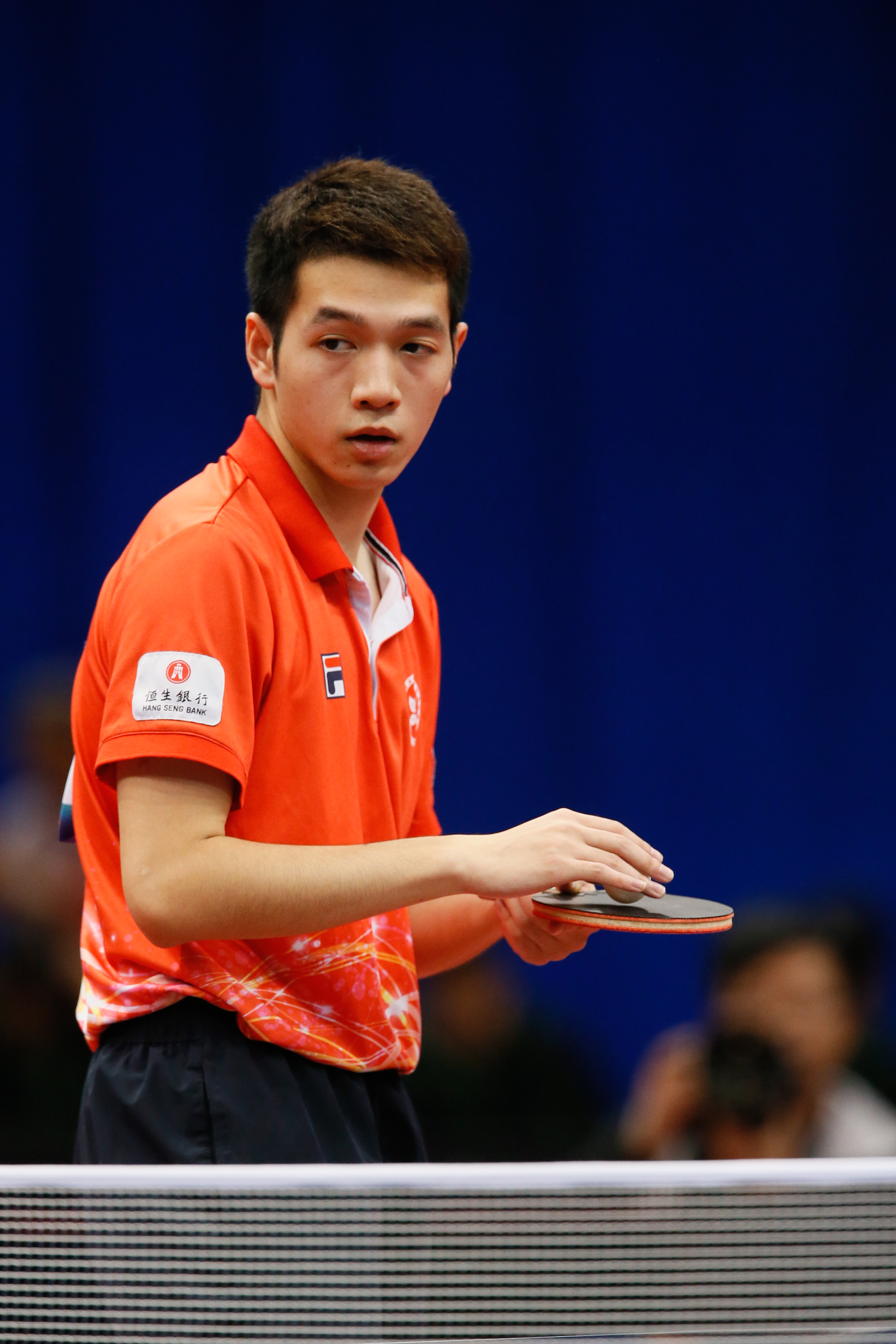
- Ho in 2017

Personal information
- Native name: 何鈞傑
- Nationality: Hong Kong, China
- Born: 20 April 1997 (age 29)

Sport
- Sport: Table tennis
Medal record
Men's table tennis
Representing Hong Kong
Asian Championships
| Silver medal – second place | 2025 Bhubaneswar | Team |
World University Games
| Bronze medal – third place | 2021 Chengdu | Mixed doubles |

Ho Kwan-kit (Chinese: 何鈞傑; born 20 April 1997) is a Hong Kong table tennis player.

He qualified to the 2016 Summer Olympics in Rio de Janeiro, and was selected to represent Hong Kong in the men's team event.
