= 2026 ITTF Mixed Team World Cup =

Tournament details
- Dates: 29 November – 6 December 2026
- Edition: 4th
- Competitors: 154 players from 20 nations
- Venue: Chengdu High-tech Sports Center
- Location: China Chengdu

The 2026 ITTF Mixed Team World Cup is the fourth edition of the ITTF Mixed Team World Cup, an international mixed-team table tennis competition organized by the International Table Tennis Federation (ITTF), held from 29 November to 6 December 2026 in Chengdu, Sichuan, China.

The mixed team event is scheduled to make its Olympic debut at Los Angeles 2028. The tournament has been expanded from 16 to 20 teams. The champion team will receive 2,500 world ranking points, distributed according to each player's individual win contribution.

== Competition format ==
The 2026 edition introduces a revised two-stage format with 20 teams.

- First Stage: Group Stage – The 20 teams are divided into two groups of 10 for round-robin play. Each team plays every other team in its group once. The top 8 teams from each group advance to the ranking stage.
- Second Stage: Ranking Stage – Placement matches determine final positions. The group winners and runners-up contest the semi-finals and final; group 3rd and 4th place teams play for positions 5–8; 5th and 6th for positions 9–12; 7th and 8th for positions 13–16. The 9th and 10th placed teams in each group are ranked joint 17th.

=== Team composition and order of play ===
A team consists of a minimum of 3 and a maximum of 4 players per gender. A toss at the call area decides whether women's singles or men's singles is played first.

If the toss winner chooses men's singles first, the order is:

1. Mixed doubles
2. Men's singles
3. Women's singles
4. Men's doubles
5. Women's doubles

If the toss winner chooses women's singles first, the order is:

1. Mixed doubles
2. Women's singles
3. Men's singles
4. Women's doubles
5. Men's doubles

=== Match rules ===
- Each individual match is played to 3 games (result 3–0 or 2–1), unless a team has already reached 8 game wins.
- Each player may play a maximum of 2 individual matches (singles or doubles) per team match.
- Players who participate in the mixed doubles cannot play in the subsequent singles matches.
- In the third game of any match, players change ends when one player or pair scores 5 points.
- Each player or pair is entitled to one time-out per individual match.

=== Group ranking ===
Group ranking follows ITTF Regulation 3.7.5:

- 2 points to a team who wins eight games first, 1 for a loss, 0 for a loss in an unplayed or unfinished match.
- If teams are tied on points, ranking is determined by the results of matches between them, considering successively match points, then ratios of games wins/losses in each individual match, then ratios of point wins/losses in each individual game.
- If ties still remain, positions are decided by lot.

== Schedule ==
The competition runs for 8 days from 29 November to 6 December 2026. The detailed schedule is as follows:

| Date | Stage | Matches |
|---|---|---|
| 29 Nov – 4 Dec 2026 | First Stage | Group matches |
| 5–6 Dec 2026 | Second Stage | Semifinals & placement matches (5 Dec) |
| 5–6 Dec 2026 | Second Stage | Placement matches & Final (6 Dec) |

== Participating teams ==
According to the list released by the International Table Tennis Federation, 20 teams with 154 players will participate in the 2026 Mixed Team World Cup.

| Continent | Participating Teams |
|---|---|
| Asia | China (Host), Japan, South Korea, Chinese Taipei, India, Hong Kong, China, Singapore |
| Africa | Egypt |
| Europe | France, Germany, Sweden, Romania, Croatia, Russia, Poland, United Kingdom, Slovakia |
| Americas | Brazil, United States |
| Oceania | Australia |

== Seeding ==
The seeding order is determined by sorting all Member Associations of their Combined Ranked score, calculated by adding the ranking positions of each association's highest-ranked entries:

| Component | Count | Ranking position used |
|---|---|---|
| Men's Singles players | 2 | Highest-ranked 2 |
| Women's Singles players | 2 | Highest-ranked 2 |
| Mixed Doubles pair | 1 | Highest-ranked pair |
| Men's Doubles pair | 1 | Highest-ranked pair |
| Women's Doubles pair | 1 | Highest-ranked pair |

The association with the lowest total is seeded first, the next lowest second, and so on.

| Seed | Team | Male/Female Athlete 1 | Male/Female Athlete 2 | Male/Female Athlete 3 | Male/Female Athlete 4 |
|---|---|---|---|---|---|
| 1 | China (H) | Wang Chuqin | Lin Shidong | Huang Youzheng | Zhou Qihao |
| 1 | China (H) | Sun Yingsha | Wang Manyu | Kuai Man | Chen Yi |
| 2 | Japan | Tomokazu Harimoto | Sora Matsushima | Shunsuke Togami | Hiroto Shinozuka |
| 2 | Japan | Miwa Harimoto | Hina Hayata | Satsuki Odo | Honoka Hashimoto |
| 3 | South Korea | Jang Woojin | Lim Jonghoon | Oh Junsung | Park Ganghyeon |
| 3 | South Korea | Shin Yubin | Kim Nayeong | Lee Eunhye | Yoo Yerin |
| 4 | Germany | Benedikt Duda | Patrick Franziska | Dang Qiu | Ricardo Walther |
| 4 | Germany | Han Ying | Annette Kaufmann | Nina Mittelham | Sabine Winter |
| 5 | Chinese Taipei | Feng Yi-Hsin | Hsu Hsien-Chia | Kuo Guan-Hong | |
| 5 | Chinese Taipei | Yeh Yi-Tian | Cheng I-Ching | Peng Yu-Han | Wu Ying Syuan |
| 6 | France | Alexis Lebrun | Felix Lebrun | Simon Gauzy | Flavien Coton |
| 6 | France | Yuan Jia Nan | Prithika Pavade | Charlotte Lutz | Nina Guo Zheng |
| 7 | Egypt | Omar Assar | Omar Bedair | Shady Magdy | Badr Mostafa |
| 7 | Egypt | Habiba Elbasoumy | Hend Fathy | Yousra Helmy | Alaa Yehia |
| 8 | Hong Kong, China | Wong Chun Ting | Lam Siu Hang | Chan Baldwin | Kwan Man Ho |
| 8 | Hong Kong, China | Doo Hoi Kem | Ng Wing Lam | Su Tsz Tung | Mak Ming Shum |
| 9 | India | Manav Thakkar | Payas Jain | Manush Shah | Ankur Bhattacharjee |
| 9 | India | Diya Chitale | Syndrela Das | Yashaswini Ghorpade | Sutirtha Mukherjee |
| 10 | Romania | Eduard Ionescu | Ovidiu Ionescu | Iulian Chirita | Darius Movileanu |
| 10 | Romania | Bernadette Szocs | Elizabeta Samara | Andreea Dragoman | Elena Zaharia |
| 11 | Brazil | Felipe Arado | Leonardo Iizuka | Guilherme Teodoro | Hamilton Yamane |
| 11 | Brazil | Beatriz Kanashiro | Victoria Strassburger | Giulia Takahashi | Laura Watanabe |
| 12 | Russia | Nikita Artemenko | Denis Ivonin | Vladimir Sidorenko | Evgeny Tikhonov |
| 12 | Russia | Elizabet Abraamian | Maria Panfilova | Mariia Tailakova | Vlada Voronina |
| 13 | Australia | Hwan Bae | Nicholas Lum | Finn Luu | Aditya Sareen |
| 13 | Australia | Yangzi Liu | Constantina Psihogios | Jiamuwa Wu | |
| 14 | Sweden | Anton Källberg | Kristian Karlsson | Mattias Karlsson | Elias Ranefur |
| 14 | Sweden | Nomin Baasan | Filippa Bergand | Christina Källberg | Alma Roose |
| 15 | United States | Andrew Cao | Kanak Jha | Jishan Liang | Nandan Naresh |
| 15 | United States | Sally Moyland | Jessica Reyes Lai | Amy Wang | Lily Zhang |
| 16 | Singapore | Clarence Chew | Josh Chua | Koen Pang | Izaac Quek |
| 16 | Singapore | Chloe Lai | Loy Ming Ying | Ser Lin Qian | Zeng Jian |
| 17 | Croatia | Ivor Ban | Andrej Gacina | Tomislav Pucar | |
| 17 | Croatia | Hana Arapovic | Dora Cosic | Lea Rakovac | |
| 18 | Poland | Maciej Kubik | Rafal Formela | Milosz Redzimski | Mateusz Zalewski |
| 18 | Poland | Natalia Bajor | Anna Brzyska | Katarzyna Wegrzyn | Zuzanna Wielgos |
| 19 | Great Britain | Connor Green | Tom Jarvis | Liam Pitchford | Samuel Walker |
| 19 | Great Britain | Tin-Tin Ho | Tianer Yu | Charlotte Carey | Anna Hursey |
| 20 | Slovakia | Lubomir Pistej | Yang Wang | Jakub Zelinka | |
| 20 | Slovakia | Tatiana Kukulkova | Ema Labosova | Dominika Wiltschkova | |

== Group Stage ==
Group 1
| Pos | Team | Pld | W | L | GW | GL | GW/GL | Pts | Notes |
|---|---|---|---|---|---|---|---|---|---|
| 1 | China (H) (1) | 0 | 0 | 0 | 0 | 0 | — | 0 | Advance to Finals |
| 2 | | 0 | 0 | 0 | 0 | 0 | — | 0 | Advance to Finals |
| 3 | | 0 | 0 | 0 | 0 | 0 | — | 0 | Advance to 5–8th placement |
| 4 | | 0 | 0 | 0 | 0 | 0 | — | 0 | Advance to 5–8th placement |
| 5 | | 0 | 0 | 0 | 0 | 0 | — | 0 | Advance to 9–12th placement |
| 6 | | 0 | 0 | 0 | 0 | 0 | — | 0 | Advance to 9–12th placement |
| 7 | | 0 | 0 | 0 | 0 | 0 | — | 0 | Advance to 13–16 placement |
| 8 | | 0 | 0 | 0 | 0 | 0 | — | 0 | Advance to 13–16 placement |
| 9 | | 0 | 0 | 0 | 0 | 0 | — | 0 | |
| 10 | | 0 | 0 | 0 | 0 | 0 | — | 0 | |

Group 2
| Pos | Team | Pld | W | L | GW | GL | GW/GL | Pts | Notes |
|---|---|---|---|---|---|---|---|---|---|
| 1 | Japan (2) | 0 | 0 | 0 | 0 | 0 | — | 0 | Advance to Finals |
| 2 | | 0 | 0 | 0 | 0 | 0 | — | 0 | Advance to Finals |
| 3 | | 0 | 0 | 0 | 0 | 0 | — | 0 | Advance to 5–8th placement |
| 4 | | 0 | 0 | 0 | 0 | 0 | — | 0 | Advance to 5–8th placement |
| 5 | | 0 | 0 | 0 | 0 | 0 | — | 0 | Advance to 9–12th placement |
| 6 | | 0 | 0 | 0 | 0 | 0 | — | 0 | Advance to 9–12th placement |
| 7 | | 0 | 0 | 0 | 0 | 0 | — | 0 | Advance to 13–16 placement |
| 8 | | 0 | 0 | 0 | 0 | 0 | — | 0 | Advance to 13–16 placement |
| 9 | | 0 | 0 | 0 | 0 | 0 | — | 0 | |
| 10 | | 0 | 0 | 0 | 0 | 0 | — | 0 | |

== Ranking Stage ==
=== Finals ===
Semifinals

Final
3rd place match

=== 5th–8th place ===
5–8th semifinals

5-6th place match
7-8th place match

=== 9th–12th place ===
9–12th semifinals

9-10th place match
11-12th place match

=== 13th–16th place ===
13–16th semifinals

13-14th place match
15-16th place match
