= 2018 China Open =

2018 China Open may refer to:

- 2018 China Open (badminton), 18–23 September in Changzhou, Jiangsu
- 2018 China Open (curling), 16–22 October in Chongqing
- 2018 China Open (snooker), 2–8 April in Beijing
- 2018 China Open (table tennis), 31 May – 3 June in Shenzhen
- 2018 China Open (tennis), 1–7 October in Beijing

== See also ==
- 2018 Chinese Taipei Open, 2–7 October, a badminton tournament
- 2018 Fuzhou China Open, 6–11 November, a badminton tournament
