= 2022 WTT Cup Finals =

Table tennis tournament in Singapore

WTT Cup Finals Xinxiang 2022 Presented by China Construction Bank
Tournament details
- Dates: 27–30 October
- Edition: 2nd
- Total prize money: US$1,000,000
- Venue: Xinxiang Pingyuan Sports Center
- Location: Xinxiang, China

Champions
- Men's singles: (China) Wang Chuqin
- Women's singles: (China) Sun Yingsha

The 2022 WTT Cup Finals (officially was the WTT Cup Finals Xinxiang 2022 Presented by China Construction Bank for sponsorship reasons) is the final tournament of the 2022 WTT Series. This is the 2nd edition of the tournament. It has been held from 27 to 30 October 2022 in Singapore and features a total prize pool of $1,000,000.

The defending men's singles champion was Fan Zhendong, but lost to Dimitrij Ovtcharov in the quarterfinals. Wang Chuqin defeated Tomokazu Harimoto to win the final. Defending women's singles champion Sun Yingsha defeated Chen Meng in the final to win her second consecutive title.

== Tournament ==
=== Venue ===
This tournament was held at the Xinxiang Pingyuan Sports Center in Xinxiang, China

=== Point distribution ===
Below is the point distribution table for each phase of the tournament for the WTT Cup Finals.

| Winner(s) | Finalist | Semi-finalists | Quarter-finalist | Round of 16 |
|---|---|---|---|---|
| 1,500 | 1,050 | 525 | 265 | 100 |

=== Prize pool ===
The total prize money is US$600,000 with the distribution of the prize money in accordance with WTT regulations.

| Winner(s) | Finalist | Semi-finalists | Quarter-finalist | Round of 16 |
|---|---|---|---|---|
| $55,000 | $45,000 | $37,500 | $30,000 | $22,500 |

== Men's singles ==
=== Seeds ===
1. (China) Fan Zhendong (quarter-finals)
2. (China) Ma Long (semi-finals)
3. (Sweden) Truls Moregard (quarter-finals)
4. (Japan) Tomokazu Harimoto (final)

=== Draw ===
Round of 16
(Chinese Taipei) Chuang C-y | 3 | 11 | 7 | 11 | 5
(Germany) D Ovtcharov | 11 | 9 | 11 | 5 | 11
(Japan) T Harimoto | 11 | 11 | 11
(Germany) P Franziska | 4 | 9 | 6
(China) Lin GY | 11 | 9 | 8 | 11 | 5
(Germany) T Boll | 9 | 11 | 11 | 6 | 11
(China) Wang CQ | 10 | 11 | 11 | 11
(Germany) D Qiu | 12 | 8 | 8 | 5
(Brazil) H Calderano | 5 | 6 | 12 | 9
3 | (Sweden) T Moregard | 11 | 11 | 10 | 11
(Chinese Taipei) Lin Y-j | 11 | 11 | 8 | 11
(Nigeria) Q Aruna | 4 | 6 | 11 | 4
(Slovenia) D Jorgic | 11 | 10 | 2 | 5
2 | (China) Ma L | 9 | 12 | 11 | 11

Quarterfinals
1 | (China) Fan ZD | 11 | 6 | 8 | 11 | 6
(Germany) D Ovtcharov | 4 | 11 | 11 | 7 | 11
4 | (Japan) T Harimoto | 11 | 11 | 12
(Germany) T Boll | 8 | 4 | 10
(China) Wang CQ | 11 | 11 | 15
3 | (Sweden) T Moregard | 8 | 3 | 13
(Chinese Taipei) Lin Y-j | 4 | 11 | 7 | 11 | 3
2 | (China) Ma L | 11 | 7 | 11 | 8 | 11

Semifinals
(Germany) D Ovtcharov | 7 | 6 | 5 | 7
4 | (Japan) T Harimoto | 11 | 11 | 11 | 11
(China) Wang CQ | 11 | 11 | 11 | 9 | 7 | 11 | 11
2 | (China) Ma L | 7 | 5 | 5 | 11 | 11 | 13 | 8

Final
4 | (Japan) T Harimoto | 11 | 8 | 9 | 8 | 11 | 7
(China) Wang CQ | 8 | 11 | 11 | 11 | 8 | 11

== Women's singles ==
=== Seeds ===
1. (China) Sun Yingsha (champion)
2. (China) Chen Meng (final)
3. (China) Wang Manyu (semi-finals)
4. (China) Wang Yidi (semi-finals)

=== Draw ===
Round of 16
1 | (China) Sun YS | 11 | 11 | 11
(Germany) N Mittelham | 8 | 4 | 6
(Japan) M Kihara | 11 | 5 | 4 | 6
(Japan) K Ishikawa | 7 | 11 | 11 | 11
4 | (China) Wang YD | 11 | 11 | 13
(South Korea) Jeon J-h | 1 | 2 | 11
(Hong Kong) Doo H K | 12 | 5 | 8 | 12
(Puerto Rico) A Diaz | 10 | 11 | 11 | 14
(Japan) M Ito | 11 | 11 | 11
(Portugal) F Yu | 7 | 7 | 5
(Germany) Y Han | 11 | 6 | 5 | 11
3 | (China) Wang MY | 6 | 11 | 11 | 13
(China) Chen XT | 11 | 9 | 11 | 11
(Monaco) X Yang | 9 | 11 | 7 | 5
(France) J N Yuan | 11 | 11 | 4 | 4
2 | (China) Chen M | 7 | 13 | 11 | 11

Quarterfinals
1 | (China) Sun YS | 11 | 11 | 11
(Japan) K Ishikawa | 6 | 4 | 7
4 | (China) Wang YD | 11 | 11 | 11
(Puerto Rico) A Diaz | 7 | 5 | 6
(Japan) M Ito | 4 | 4 | 4
3 | (China) Wang MY | 11 | 11 | 11
(China) Chen XT | 11 | 8 | 7 | 6
2 | (China) Chen M | 7 | 11 | 11 | 11

Semifinals
1 | (China) Sun YS | 11 | 11 | 4 | 14 | 11
4 | (China) Wang YD | 6 | 4 | 11 | 12 | 6
3 | (China) Wang MY | 9 | 3 | 9 | 13 | 6
2 | (China) Chen M | 11 | 11 | 11 | 11 | 11

Final
1 | (China) Sun YS | 4 | 11 | 11 | 12 | 6 | 10 | 12
2 | (China) Chen M | 11 | 4 | 8 | 10 | 11 | 12 | 10
