= Table tennis at the 2018 Asian Games – Women's singles =

Women's singles at the 2018 Asian Games
- Venue: Jakarta International Expo
- Date: 30 August – 1 September 2018
- Competitors: 40 from 21 nations

Medalists
gold medal	Wang Manyu	China
silver medal	Chen Meng	China
bronze medal	Jeon Ji-hee	South Korea
bronze medal	Yu Mengyu	Singapore

The women's singles table tennis event at the 2018 Asian Games took place from 30 August to 1 September 2018 at the Jakarta International Expo. Seeds were based on the individual ITTF World Ranking lists published in August 2018 with a maximum of 2 players per country.

== Schedule ==
All times are Western Indonesia Time (UTC+07:00)

Date	Time	Event
Thursday, 30 August 2018	10:45	Round of 64
Thursday, 30 August 2018	12:15	Round of 32
Friday, 31 August 2018	10:00	Round of 16
Friday, 31 August 2018	15:00	Quarterfinals
Saturday, 1 September 2018	10:00	Semifinals
Saturday, 1 September 2018	16:00	Final

== Results ==
=== Finals ===
Quarterfinals
1	Chen Meng (CHN)	11	12	11	12
8	Lee Ho Ching (HKG)	8	10	7	10
7	Miyu Kato (JPN)	11	12	6	11	12	8	8
9	Jeon Ji-hee (KOR)	5	10	11	7	14	11	11
3	Cheng I-ching (TPE)	7	6	11	4	3
14	Yu Mengyu (SGP)	11	11	9	11	11
5	Suh Hyo-won (KOR)	8	6	4	7
2	Wang Manyu (CHN)	11	11	11	11

Semifinals
1	Chen Meng (CHN)	11	11	11	11
9	Jeon Ji-hee (KOR)	7	7	6	4
14	Yu Mengyu (SGP)	7	6	5	11	7
2	Wang Manyu (CHN)	11	11	11	9	11

Final
1	Chen Meng (CHN)	7	11	16	11	6	8	8
2	Wang Manyu (CHN)	11	5	14	7	11	11	11

=== Top half ===
==== Section 1 ====
Round of 64							Round of 32						Round of 16
							1	Chen Meng (CHN)	11	11	11	11
	Nguyễn Khoa Diệu Khánh (VIE)	11	9	11	11	11		Nguyễn Khoa Diệu Khánh (VIE)	1	3	2	3
25	Malak Khoury (LBN)	7	11	2	7	6							1	Chen Meng (CHN)	11	11	11	11
													10	Chen Szu-yu (TPE)	5	6	3	5
							17	Mouma Das (IND)	6	5	6	6
							10	Chen Szu-yu (TPE)	11	11	11	11

==== Section 2 ====
Round of 64						Round of 32							Round of 16
						11	Suthasini Sawettabut (THA)	11	11	11	6	11
						21	Chong Weng I (MAC)	8	2	7	11	3
													11	Suthasini Sawettabut (THA)	7	3	6	3
27	Batbayaryn Doljinzuu (MGL)	11	13	11	11								8	Lee Ho Ching (HKG)	11	11	11	11
	Swechchha Nembang (NEP)	9	11	6	6	27	Batbayaryn Doljinzuu (MGL)	6	10	3	9
						8	Lee Ho Ching (HKG)	11	12	11	11

==== Section 3 ====
Round of 64						Round of 32						Round of 16
						7	Miyu Kato (JPN)	11	11	11	11
	Nitnapha Kongphet (LAO)	7	7	4	8	29	Kharisma Nur Hawwa (INA)	3	8	7	9
29	Kharisma Nur Hawwa (INA)	11	11	11	11							7	Miyu Kato (JPN)	7	2	9	11	11	11	14
												12	Kim Song-i (PRK)	11	11	11	5	9	4	12
						20	Mahshid Ashtari (IRI)	8	5	7	10
						12	Kim Song-i (PRK)	11	11	11	12

==== Section 4 ====
Round of 64									Round of 32						Round of 16
									9	Jeon Ji-hee (KOR)	11	11	11	11
									24	Ho Ying (MAS)	8	7	5	6
															9	Jeon Ji-hee (KOR)	13	11	12	11
32	Aya Majdi (QAT)	2	12	8	7	11	12	7							4	Feng Tianwei (SGP)	11	9	10	8
	Aisha Iqbal Ansari (PAK)	11	10	11	11	6	10	11		Aisha Iqbal Ansari (PAK)	5	2	2	5
									4	Feng Tianwei (SGP)	11	11	11	11

=== Bottom half ===
==== Section 5 ====
Round of 64								Round of 32							Round of 16
								3	Cheng I-ching (TPE)	11	11	11	11
	Batmönkhiin Bolor-Erdene (MGL)	2	11	7	11	11	11		Batmönkhiin Bolor-Erdene (MGL)	6	2	5	3
31	Maha Faramarzi (QAT)	11	7	11	6	7	9								3	Cheng I-ching (TPE)	7	11	9	11	12	11
															13	Minami Ando (JPN)	11	7	11	6	10	6
								23	Nguyễn Thị Nga (VIE)	6	3	11	3	3
								13	Minami Ando (JPN)	11	11	8	11	11

==== Section 6 ====
Round of 64									Round of 32							Round of 16
									14	Yu Mengyu (SGP)	11	11	11	7	11
									22	Alice Chang (MAS)	4	2	4	11	2
																14	Yu Mengyu (SGP)	5	13	11	7	12	9	11
28	Tam Sut Fei (MAC)	8	11	11	8	11	6	7								6	Doo Hoi Kem (HKG)	11	11	8	11	10	11	6
	Nabita Shrestha (NEP)	11	8	3	11	7	11	11		Nabita Shrestha (NEP)	5	1	6	7
									6	Doo Hoi Kem (HKG)	11	11	11	11

==== Section 7 ====
Round of 64						Round of 32						Round of 16
						5	Suh Hyo-won (KOR)	11	11	11	11
	Thiphakone Southammavong (LAO)	8	2	8	6	30	Rina Sintya (INA)	4	6	6	7
30	Rina Sintya (INA)	11	11	11	11							5	Suh Hyo-won (KOR)	11	11	13	11	11
												16	Cha Hyo-sim (PRK)	2	9	15	9	7
						19	Neda Shahsavari (IRI)	4	2	9	4
						16	Cha Hyo-sim (PRK)	11	11	11	11

==== Section 8 ====
Round of 64						Round of 32						Round of 16
						15	Manika Batra (IND)	11	11	11	11
						18	Nanthana Komwong (THA)	3	7	3	6
												15	Manika Batra (IND)	2	8	8	11	4
26	Ishara Madurangi (SRI)	11	11	11	11							2	Wang Manyu (CHN)	11	11	11	6	11
	Fatima Khan (PAK)	8	2	8	5	26	Ishara Madurangi (SRI)	8	5	8	1
						2	Wang Manyu (CHN)	11	11	11	11
