= ITTF Mixed Team World Cup =

Tournament details
- Dates: December (Annual)
- Edition: 3 (as of 2025)
- Venue: Sichuan Gymnasium（2023–2027）
- Location: (China) Chengdu（2023–2027）

The ITTF Mixed Team World Cup is a premier mixed-team table tennis tournament organized by the International Table Tennis Federation (ITTF). It is considered one of the three major world table tennis events, alongside the World Table Tennis Championships and the Table Tennis World Cup. The inaugural event was held in December 2023 in Chengdu, Sichuan Province, China, and it has been confirmed that Chengdu will host the tournament for five consecutive years (2023–2027).

== History ==
=== Inauguration ===
On August 26, 2023, the ITTF announced the creation of a new event, the ITTF Mixed Team World Cup. Aiming to enhance the appeal of table tennis, promote teamwork, and advance gender equality, the ITTF decided to establish this mixed-team competition. This event innovatively combines male and female players within the same team, designed to showcase the inclusivity and team spirit of table tennis. The successful format and positive reception have provided valuable practical foundation for the inclusion of mixed team table tennis in the 2028 Summer Olympics in Los Angeles.

=== Editions ===
Year	Host city	Gold	Silver	Bronze
2023	Chengdu	(China) China; Chen Meng; Fan Zhendong; Lin Gaoyuan; Ma Long; Sun Yingsha; Wang Chuqin; Wang Manyu; Wang Yidi	(South Korea) South Korea; An Jae-hyun; Jang Woo-jin; Jeon Ji-hee; Kim Na-yeong; Lee Sang-su; Lee Zi-on; Lim Jong-hoon; Shin Yu-bin	(Japan) Japan; Miwa Harimoto; Tomokazu Harimoto; Hina Hayata; Miu Hirano; Miyuu Kihara; Kakeru Sone; Shunsuke Togami; Ryoichi Yoshiyama
2024	Chengdu	(China) China; Kuai Man; Liang Jingkun; Lin Gaoyuan; Lin Shidong; Sun Yingsha; Wang Chuqin; Wang Manyu; Wang Yidi	(South Korea) South Korea; An Jae-hyun; Cho Dae-seong; Jang Woo-jin; Jeon Ji-hee; Kim Na-yeong; Oh Jun-sung; Shin Yu-bin; Suh Hyo-won	(Hong Kong) Hong Kong; Chan Baldwin; Doo Hoi Kem; Lam Siu-hang; Lee Hoi Man Karen; Ng Wing Lam; Wong Chun-ting; Wong Hoi Tung; Yiu Kwan To
2025	Chengdu	China; Kuai Man; Liang Jingkun; Lin Shidong; Sun Yingsha; Wang Chuqin; Wang Manyu; Wang Yidi; Xu Yingbin	Japan; Miwa Harimoto; Tomokazu Harimoto; Hina Hayata; Mima Ito; Sora Matsushima; Satsuki Odo; Hiroto Shinozuka; Shunsuke Togami	Germany; Benedikt Duda; Patrick Franziska; Annett Kaufmann; Nina Mittelham; Dang Qiu; Sabine Winter
2026	Chengdu			
2027	Chengdu			

== Format ==
The event employs an innovative first to 8 games system within a maximum of 15 games. The match sequence is fixed, and each individual match (rubber) is played best of three games.

=== Match Sequence (2023–2025) ===
1. Mixed Doubles
2. Women's Singles (Players who participated in the mixed doubles cannot play in the subsequent singles matches)
3. Men's Singles
4. Women's Doubles OR Men's Doubles (The order of the last two doubles matches is determined by the captain of the lower-ranked team)
5. Men's Doubles OR Women's Doubles

=== Match Sequence (2026) ===
In the 2026 edition, a toss at the call area decides whether men's singles or women's singles is played first. Mixed doubles is always played first, and players who participated in the mixed doubles cannot play in the subsequent singles matches.

If men's singles is chosen first:

1. Mixed Doubles
2. Men's Singles
3. Women's Singles
4. Men's Doubles
5. Women's Doubles

If women's singles is chosen first:

1. Mixed Doubles
2. Women's Singles
3. Men's Singles
4. Women's Doubles
5. Men's Doubles

The order of the final two doubles matches follows directly from the toss choice; it is no longer decided by the captain of the lower-ranked team.

=== Rules ===
- Each team consists of 3 to 4 male and 3 to 4 female players per match.
- Each individual match is played best of three games.
- The team that first accumulates 8 games wins the overall match.

== Qualification ==
The tournament invites 16 teams to participate, including the host nation and teams qualifying through continental competitions.

- Asia: 4–5 teams
- Europe: 4–5 teams
- Africa: 2 teams
- Americas: 2–3 teams
- Oceania: 1 team

== Statistics ==
=== Medal table ===
As of 2025 edition
Rank	Nation	Gold	Silver	Bronze	Total
1	China	3	0	0	3
2	South Korea	0	2	0	2
3	Japan	0	1	1	2
4	Germany	0	0	1	1
4	Hong Kong	0	0	1	1
Totals (5 entries)		3	3	3	9
