= 2022 WTT Series =

Table tennis tournament

2022 World Table Tennis Series
Tournament details
- Dates: 27 February – 6 November 2022
- Edition: 2nd

The 2022 WTT series was the 2nd season of the World Table Tennis's professional table tennis world tour.

== Key ==
WTT Grand Smash
WTT Cup Finals
WTT Champions
WTT Star Contender
WTT Contender

== Winners ==
Tour	Report	Men's singles	Women's singles	Men's doubles	Women's doubles	Mixed doubles
Grand Smash
Singapore Smash	Report	(China) Fan Zhendong	(China) Chen Meng	(China) Fan Zhendong (China) Wang Chuqin	(China) Sun Yingsha (China) Wang Manyu	(China) Wang Chuqin (China) Sun Yingsha
WTT Finals
Cup Finals	Report	(China) Wang Chuqin	(China) Sun Yingsha			
WTT Champions
Champions European Summer Series	Report	(Japan) Tomokazu Harimoto	(China) Wang Manyu			
Champions Macao	Report	(China) Wang Chuqin	(China) Sun Yingsha			
WTT Star Contender
Star Contender Doha	Report	(Croatia) Andrej Gacina	(Japan) Miyuu Kihara	(Germany) Benedikt Duda (Germany) Dang Qiu	(Japan) Miyuu Kihara (Japan) Miyu Nagasaki	(France) Emmanuel Lebesson (France) Jia Nan Yuan
Star Contender European Summer Series	Report	(China) Wang Chuqin	(China) Wang Yidi	(South Korea) Cho Dae-seong (South Korea) Lee Sang-su	(China) Sun Yingsha (China) Wang Manyu	(China) Wang Chuqin (China) Wang Manyu
WTT Contender
Contender Muscat I	Report	(China) Liang Jingkun	(China) Kuai Man	(China) Lin Shidong (China) Xiang Peng	(China) Kuai Man (China) Zhang Rui	(China) Wang Chuqin (China) Chen Xingtong
Contender Doha	Report	(China) Yuan Licen	(China) Fan Siqi	(Sweden) Kristian Karlsson (Sweden) Mattias Falck	(Japan) Miyuu Kihara (Japan) Miyu Nagasaki	(Chinese Taipei) Lin Yun-ju (Chinese Taipei) Cheng I-ching
Contender Zagreb	Report	(Chinese Taipei) Lin Yun-ju	(Japan) Mima Ito	(South Korea) Cho Dae-seong (South Korea) Jang Woo-jin	(Japan) Hina Hayata (Japan) Mima Ito	(Japan) Tomokazu Harimoto (Japan) Hina Hayata
Contender Lima	Report	(Germany) Dang Qiu	(Germany) Nina Mittelham	(Sweden) Mattias Falck (Sweden) Anton Kallberg	(Japan) Sakura Mori (Japan) Asuka Sasao	(Germany) Dang Qiu (Germany) Nina Mittelham
Contender Tunis	Report	(Brazil) hugo Calderano	(China) Zhang Rui	(Japan) Tomokazu Harimoto (Japan) Yuto Kizukuri	(China) Kuai Man (China) Zhang Rui	(Japan) Tomokazu Harimoto (Japan) Miwa Harimoto
Contender Muscat II	Report	(South Korea) Jang Woo-jin	(China) Chen Xingtong	(China) Niu Guankai (China) Sai Linwei	(China) Chen Xingtong (China) Qian Tianyi	(China) Liu Yebo (China) Chen Xingtong
Contender Almaty	Report	(Germany) Ruwen Filus	(Japan) Hina Hayata	(Chinese Taipei) Liao Cheng-ting (Chinese Taipei) Lin Yun-ju	(Japan) Hina Hayata (Japan) Miu Hirano	(Chinese Taipei) Lin Yun-ju (Chinese Taipei) Chen Szu-yu
Contender Nova Gorica	Report	(Japan) Hiroto Shinozuka	(South Korea) Shin Yu-bin	(Japan) Hiroto Shinozuka (Japan) Shunsuke Togami	(Hong Kong) Doo Hoi Kem (Hong Kong) Zhu Chengzhu	(South Korea) Lim Jong-hoon (South Korea) Shin Yu-bin

== Results ==
This is the complete schedule of events on the 2022 calendar, with the champions and runners-up documented.

February
Date	Tournament	Champions	Runners-up
27 February-5 March	WTT Contender Muscat I: Location: Muscat, Oman; Venue: Sultan Qaboos Sport Complex; Category: Contender; Prize: $75,000; Draws: 32MS/32WS/16MD/16WD/16XD	(China) Liang Jingkun	(China) Lin Gaoyuan
27 February-5 March	WTT Contender Muscat I: Location: Muscat, Oman; Venue: Sultan Qaboos Sport Complex; Category: Contender; Prize: $75,000; Draws: 32MS/32WS/16MD/16WD/16XD	Score: 4–1 (9–11, 11–0, 11–5, 11–2, 11–9)	
27 February-5 March	WTT Contender Muscat I: Location: Muscat, Oman; Venue: Sultan Qaboos Sport Complex; Category: Contender; Prize: $75,000; Draws: 32MS/32WS/16MD/16WD/16XD	(China) Kuai Man	(China) Fan Siqi
27 February-5 March	WTT Contender Muscat I: Location: Muscat, Oman; Venue: Sultan Qaboos Sport Complex; Category: Contender; Prize: $75,000; Draws: 32MS/32WS/16MD/16WD/16XD	Score: 4–1 (11–8, 11–5, 11–5, 11–13, 11–6)	
27 February-5 March	WTT Contender Muscat I: Location: Muscat, Oman; Venue: Sultan Qaboos Sport Complex; Category: Contender; Prize: $75,000; Draws: 32MS/32WS/16MD/16WD/16XD	(China) Lin Shidong (China) Xiang Peng	(Chinese Taipei) Peng Wang-wei (Chinese Taipei) Chuang Chih-yuan
27 February-5 March	WTT Contender Muscat I: Location: Muscat, Oman; Venue: Sultan Qaboos Sport Complex; Category: Contender; Prize: $75,000; Draws: 32MS/32WS/16MD/16WD/16XD	Score: 3–0 (11–7, 11–9, 11–5)	
27 February-5 March	WTT Contender Muscat I: Location: Muscat, Oman; Venue: Sultan Qaboos Sport Complex; Category: Contender; Prize: $75,000; Draws: 32MS/32WS/16MD/16WD/16XD	(China) Zhang Rui (China) Kuai Man	(India) Sutirtha Mukherjee (India) Ayhika Mukherjee
27 February-5 March	WTT Contender Muscat I: Location: Muscat, Oman; Venue: Sultan Qaboos Sport Complex; Category: Contender; Prize: $75,000; Draws: 32MS/32WS/16MD/16WD/16XD	Score: 3–1 (11–6, 8–11, 12–10, 11–7)	
27 February-5 March	WTT Contender Muscat I: Location: Muscat, Oman; Venue: Sultan Qaboos Sport Complex; Category: Contender; Prize: $75,000; Draws: 32MS/32WS/16MD/16WD/16XD	(China) Wang Chuqin (China) Chen Xingtong	(India) Manav Vikash Thakkar (India) Archana Girish Kamath
27 February-5 March	WTT Contender Muscat I: Location: Muscat, Oman; Venue: Sultan Qaboos Sport Complex; Category: Contender; Prize: $75,000; Draws: 32MS/32WS/16MD/16WD/16XD	Score: 3–0 (11–3, 11–3, 11–6)	

March
Date	Tournament	Champions	Runners-up
7–20 March	Singapore Smash: Location: Singapore; Venue: Singapore Sports Hub; Category: Grand Smash; Prize: $2,000,000; Draws: 64MS/64WS/24MD/24WD/16XD	(China) Fan Zhendong	(China) Ma Long
7–20 March	Singapore Smash: Location: Singapore; Venue: Singapore Sports Hub; Category: Grand Smash; Prize: $2,000,000; Draws: 64MS/64WS/24MD/24WD/16XD	Score: 4–3 (11–6, 11–6, 6–11, 9–11, 8–11, 11–8, 11–7)	
7–20 March	Singapore Smash: Location: Singapore; Venue: Singapore Sports Hub; Category: Grand Smash; Prize: $2,000,000; Draws: 64MS/64WS/24MD/24WD/16XD	(China) Chen Meng	(China) Wang Manyu
7–20 March	Singapore Smash: Location: Singapore; Venue: Singapore Sports Hub; Category: Grand Smash; Prize: $2,000,000; Draws: 64MS/64WS/24MD/24WD/16XD	Score: 4–3 (11–9, 8–11, 11–9, 11–8, 6–11, 9–11, 11–8)	
7–20 March	Singapore Smash: Location: Singapore; Venue: Singapore Sports Hub; Category: Grand Smash; Prize: $2,000,000; Draws: 64MS/64WS/24MD/24WD/16XD	(China) Fan Zhendong (China) Wang Chuqin	(Japan) Shunsuke Togami (Japan) Yukiya Uda
7–20 March	Singapore Smash: Location: Singapore; Venue: Singapore Sports Hub; Category: Grand Smash; Prize: $2,000,000; Draws: 64MS/64WS/24MD/24WD/16XD	Score: 3–1 (12–10, 12–10, 12–14, 11–7)	
7–20 March	Singapore Smash: Location: Singapore; Venue: Singapore Sports Hub; Category: Grand Smash; Prize: $2,000,000; Draws: 64MS/64WS/24MD/24WD/16XD	(China) Sun Yingsha (China) Wang Manyu	(Japan) Hina Hayata (Japan) Mima Ito
7–20 March	Singapore Smash: Location: Singapore; Venue: Singapore Sports Hub; Category: Grand Smash; Prize: $2,000,000; Draws: 64MS/64WS/24MD/24WD/16XD	Score: 3–0 (11–4, 11–6, 11–4)	
7–20 March	Singapore Smash: Location: Singapore; Venue: Singapore Sports Hub; Category: Grand Smash; Prize: $2,000,000; Draws: 64MS/64WS/24MD/24WD/16XD	(China) Wang Chuqin (China) Sun Yingsha	(Chinese Taipei) Lin Yun-ju (Chinese Taipei) Cheng I-ching
7–20 March	Singapore Smash: Location: Singapore; Venue: Singapore Sports Hub; Category: Grand Smash; Prize: $2,000,000; Draws: 64MS/64WS/24MD/24WD/16XD	Score: 3–0 (11–3, 12–10, 11–4)	
18-24 March	WTT Contender Doha: Location: Doha, Qatar; Venue: Lusail Sports Arena; Category: Contender; Prize: $75,000; Draws: 32MS/32WS/16MD/16WD/16XD	(China) Yuan Licen	(Germany) Dang Qiu
18-24 March	WTT Contender Doha: Location: Doha, Qatar; Venue: Lusail Sports Arena; Category: Contender; Prize: $75,000; Draws: 32MS/32WS/16MD/16WD/16XD	Score: 4–2 (10–12, 11–8, 11–4, 11–5, 9–11, 11–5)	
18-24 March	WTT Contender Doha: Location: Doha, Qatar; Venue: Lusail Sports Arena; Category: Contender; Prize: $75,000; Draws: 32MS/32WS/16MD/16WD/16XD	(China) Fan Siqi	(China) Zhang Rui
18-24 March	WTT Contender Doha: Location: Doha, Qatar; Venue: Lusail Sports Arena; Category: Contender; Prize: $75,000; Draws: 32MS/32WS/16MD/16WD/16XD	Score: 4–3 (11–7, 7–11, 13–11, 7–11, 8–11, 11–9, 11–9)	
18-24 March	WTT Contender Doha: Location: Doha, Qatar; Venue: Lusail Sports Arena; Category: Contender; Prize: $75,000; Draws: 32MS/32WS/16MD/16WD/16XD	(Sweden) Kristian Karlsson (Sweden) Mattias Falck	(Germany) Kilian Ort (Germany) Ricardo Walther
18-24 March	WTT Contender Doha: Location: Doha, Qatar; Venue: Lusail Sports Arena; Category: Contender; Prize: $75,000; Draws: 32MS/32WS/16MD/16WD/16XD	Score: 3–2 (13–15, 10–12, 11–6, 11–9, 11–8)	
18-24 March	WTT Contender Doha: Location: Doha, Qatar; Venue: Lusail Sports Arena; Category: Contender; Prize: $75,000; Draws: 32MS/32WS/16MD/16WD/16XD	(Japan) Miyuu Kihara (Japan) Miyu Nagasaki	(Chinese Taipei) Chen Szu-yu (Chinese Taipei) Huang Yi-hua
18-24 March	WTT Contender Doha: Location: Doha, Qatar; Venue: Lusail Sports Arena; Category: Contender; Prize: $75,000; Draws: 32MS/32WS/16MD/16WD/16XD	Score: 3–0 (11–4, 11–7, 11–5)	
18-24 March	WTT Contender Doha: Location: Doha, Qatar; Venue: Lusail Sports Arena; Category: Contender; Prize: $75,000; Draws: 32MS/32WS/16MD/16WD/16XD	(Chinese Taipei) Lin Yun-ju (Chinese Taipei) Cheng I-ching	(India) Sathiyan Gnanasekaran (India) Manika Batra
18-24 March	WTT Contender Doha: Location: Doha, Qatar; Venue: Lusail Sports Arena; Category: Contender; Prize: $75,000; Draws: 32MS/32WS/16MD/16WD/16XD	Score: 3–0 (11–4, 11–5, 11–3)	
25–31 March	WTT Star Contender Doha: Location: Doha, Qatar; Venue: Lusail Sports Arena; Category: Star Contender; Prize: $250,000; Draws: 48MS/48WS/16MD/16WD/16XD	(Croatia) Andrej Gacina	(South Korea) Lim Jong-hoon
25–31 March	WTT Star Contender Doha: Location: Doha, Qatar; Venue: Lusail Sports Arena; Category: Star Contender; Prize: $250,000; Draws: 48MS/48WS/16MD/16WD/16XD	Score: 4–2 (6–11, 8–11, 12–10, 11–7, 11–9, 11–9)	
25–31 March	WTT Star Contender Doha: Location: Doha, Qatar; Venue: Lusail Sports Arena; Category: Star Contender; Prize: $250,000; Draws: 48MS/48WS/16MD/16WD/16XD	(Japan) Miyuu Kihara	(Germany) Ying Han
25–31 March	WTT Star Contender Doha: Location: Doha, Qatar; Venue: Lusail Sports Arena; Category: Star Contender; Prize: $250,000; Draws: 48MS/48WS/16MD/16WD/16XD	Score: 4–3 (8–11, 12–10, 9–11, 3–11, 11–7, 11–3, 11–1)	
25–31 March	WTT Star Contender Doha: Location: Doha, Qatar; Venue: Lusail Sports Arena; Category: Star Contender; Prize: $250,000; Draws: 48MS/48WS/16MD/16WD/16XD	(Germany) Dang Qiu (Germany) Benedikt Duda	(Chinese Taipei) Liao Cheng-ting (Chinese Taipei) Lin Yun-ju
25–31 March	WTT Star Contender Doha: Location: Doha, Qatar; Venue: Lusail Sports Arena; Category: Star Contender; Prize: $250,000; Draws: 48MS/48WS/16MD/16WD/16XD	Score: 3–2 (11–7, 6–11, 11–6, 3–11, 11–4)	
25–31 March	WTT Star Contender Doha: Location: Doha, Qatar; Venue: Lusail Sports Arena; Category: Star Contender; Prize: $250,000; Draws: 48MS/48WS/16MD/16WD/16XD	(Japan) Miyuu Kihara (Japan) Miyu Nagasaki	(Chinese Taipei) Li Yu-jhun (Chinese Taipei) Cheng I-ching
25–31 March	WTT Star Contender Doha: Location: Doha, Qatar; Venue: Lusail Sports Arena; Category: Star Contender; Prize: $250,000; Draws: 48MS/48WS/16MD/16WD/16XD	Score: 3–0 (13–11, 11–5, 11–6)	
25–31 March	WTT Star Contender Doha: Location: Doha, Qatar; Venue: Lusail Sports Arena; Category: Star Contender; Prize: $250,000; Draws: 48MS/48WS/16MD/16WD/16XD	(France) Jia Nan Yuan (France) Emmanuel Lebesson	(Chinese Taipei) Cheng I-ching (Chinese Taipei) Lin Yun-ju
25–31 March	WTT Star Contender Doha: Location: Doha, Qatar; Venue: Lusail Sports Arena; Category: Star Contender; Prize: $250,000; Draws: 48MS/48WS/16MD/16WD/16XD	Score: 3–0 (11–8, 14–12, 12–10)	

June
Date	Tournament	Champions	Runners-up
13–19 June	WTT Contender Zagreb: Location: Zagreb, Croatia; Venue: Dom Sportova; Category: Contender; Prize: $75,000; Draws: 32MS/32WS/16MD/16WD/16XD	(Chinese Taipei) Lin Yun-ju	(China) Xiang Peng
13–19 June	WTT Contender Zagreb: Location: Zagreb, Croatia; Venue: Dom Sportova; Category: Contender; Prize: $75,000; Draws: 32MS/32WS/16MD/16WD/16XD	Score: 4–0 (11–8, 11–9, 11–5, 11–8)	
13–19 June	WTT Contender Zagreb: Location: Zagreb, Croatia; Venue: Dom Sportova; Category: Contender; Prize: $75,000; Draws: 32MS/32WS/16MD/16WD/16XD	(Japan) Mima Ito	(Japan) Miu Hirano
13–19 June	WTT Contender Zagreb: Location: Zagreb, Croatia; Venue: Dom Sportova; Category: Contender; Prize: $75,000; Draws: 32MS/32WS/16MD/16WD/16XD	Score: 4–2 (11–8, 4–11, 11–4, 11–7, 10–12, 11–1)	
13–19 June	WTT Contender Zagreb: Location: Zagreb, Croatia; Venue: Dom Sportova; Category: Contender; Prize: $75,000; Draws: 32MS/32WS/16MD/16WD/16XD	(South Korea) Cho Dae-seong (South Korea) Jang Woo-jin	(Japan) Yukiya Uda (Japan) Shunsuke Togami
13–19 June	WTT Contender Zagreb: Location: Zagreb, Croatia; Venue: Dom Sportova; Category: Contender; Prize: $75,000; Draws: 32MS/32WS/16MD/16WD/16XD	Score: 3–0 (11–9, 13–11, 11–8)	
13–19 June	WTT Contender Zagreb: Location: Zagreb, Croatia; Venue: Dom Sportova; Category: Contender; Prize: $75,000; Draws: 32MS/32WS/16MD/16WD/16XD	(Japan) Mima Ito (Japan) Hina Hayata	(Germany) Xiaona Shan (Germany) Sabine Winter
13–19 June	WTT Contender Zagreb: Location: Zagreb, Croatia; Venue: Dom Sportova; Category: Contender; Prize: $75,000; Draws: 32MS/32WS/16MD/16WD/16XD	Score: 3–1 (12–10, 11–3, 8–11, 11–9)	
13–19 June	WTT Contender Zagreb: Location: Zagreb, Croatia; Venue: Dom Sportova; Category: Contender; Prize: $75,000; Draws: 32MS/32WS/16MD/16WD/16XD	(Japan) Tomokazu Harimoto (Japan) Hina Hayata	(Hong Kong) Doo Hoi Kem (Hong Kong) Wong Chun Ting
13–19 June	WTT Contender Zagreb: Location: Zagreb, Croatia; Venue: Dom Sportova; Category: Contender; Prize: $75,000; Draws: 32MS/32WS/16MD/16WD/16XD	Score: 3–0 (11–7, 11–5, 11–5)	
14–19 June	WTT Contender Lima: Location: Lima, Peru; Venue: Villa Deportiva Nacional; Category: Contender; Prize: $75,000; Draws: 32MS/32WS/16MD/16WD/16XD	(Germany) Dang Qiu	(Germany) Dimitrij Ovtcharov
14–19 June	WTT Contender Lima: Location: Lima, Peru; Venue: Villa Deportiva Nacional; Category: Contender; Prize: $75,000; Draws: 32MS/32WS/16MD/16WD/16XD	Score: 4–3 (6–11, 8–11, 13–11, 11–6, 11–7, 11–13, 11–8)	
14–19 June	WTT Contender Lima: Location: Lima, Peru; Venue: Villa Deportiva Nacional; Category: Contender; Prize: $75,000; Draws: 32MS/32WS/16MD/16WD/16XD	(Germany) Nina Mittelham	(Japan) Miyu Nagasaki
14–19 June	WTT Contender Lima: Location: Lima, Peru; Venue: Villa Deportiva Nacional; Category: Contender; Prize: $75,000; Draws: 32MS/32WS/16MD/16WD/16XD	Score: 4–3 (11–9, 11–9, 7–11, 11–6, 9–11, 10–12, 11–7)	
14–19 June	WTT Contender Lima: Location: Lima, Peru; Venue: Villa Deportiva Nacional; Category: Contender; Prize: $75,000; Draws: 32MS/32WS/16MD/16WD/16XD	(Sweden) Anton Kallberg (Sweden) Mattias Falck	(Argentina) Gaston Alto (Argentina) Horacio Cifuentes
14–19 June	WTT Contender Lima: Location: Lima, Peru; Venue: Villa Deportiva Nacional; Category: Contender; Prize: $75,000; Draws: 32MS/32WS/16MD/16WD/16XD	Score: 3–1 (11–7, 11–3, 7–11, 11–9)	
14–19 June	WTT Contender Lima: Location: Lima, Peru; Venue: Villa Deportiva Nacional; Category: Contender; Prize: $75,000; Draws: 32MS/32WS/16MD/16WD/16XD	(Japan) Asuka Sasao (Japan) Sakura Mori	(Chinese Taipei) Cheng Hsien-tzu (Chinese Taipei) Huang Yu-wen
14–19 June	WTT Contender Lima: Location: Lima, Peru; Venue: Villa Deportiva Nacional; Category: Contender; Prize: $75,000; Draws: 32MS/32WS/16MD/16WD/16XD	Score: 3–1 (11–6, 7–11, 11–5, 11–4)	
14–19 June	WTT Contender Lima: Location: Lima, Peru; Venue: Villa Deportiva Nacional; Category: Contender; Prize: $75,000; Draws: 32MS/32WS/16MD/16WD/16XD	(Germany) Nina Mittelham (Germany) Dang Qiu	(Luxembourg) Sarah De Nutte (Luxembourg) Eric Glod
14–19 June	WTT Contender Lima: Location: Lima, Peru; Venue: Villa Deportiva Nacional; Category: Contender; Prize: $75,000; Draws: 32MS/32WS/16MD/16WD/16XD	Score: 3–2 (9–11, 10–12, 11–8, 11–7, 13–11)	

July
Date	Tournament	Champions	Runners-up
11-17 July	WTT Star Contender European Summer Series: Location: Budapest, Hungary; Venue: BOK Hall; Category: Star Contender; Prize: $250,000; Draws: 32MS/32WS/16MD/16WD/16XD	(China) Wang Chuqin	(Sweden) Truls Moregard
11-17 July	WTT Star Contender European Summer Series: Location: Budapest, Hungary; Venue: BOK Hall; Category: Star Contender; Prize: $250,000; Draws: 32MS/32WS/16MD/16WD/16XD	Score: 4–1 (11–7, 9–11, 11–6, 13–11, 11–7)	
11-17 July	WTT Star Contender European Summer Series: Location: Budapest, Hungary; Venue: BOK Hall; Category: Star Contender; Prize: $250,000; Draws: 32MS/32WS/16MD/16WD/16XD	(China) Wang Yidi	(China) Sun Yingsha
11-17 July	WTT Star Contender European Summer Series: Location: Budapest, Hungary; Venue: BOK Hall; Category: Star Contender; Prize: $250,000; Draws: 32MS/32WS/16MD/16WD/16XD	Score: 4–1 (9–11, 11–9, 11–6, 11–6, 11–4)	
11-17 July	WTT Star Contender European Summer Series: Location: Budapest, Hungary; Venue: BOK Hall; Category: Star Contender; Prize: $250,000; Draws: 32MS/32WS/16MD/16WD/16XD	(South Korea) Liang Jingkun (South Korea) Lin Gaoyuan	(China) Cho Dae-Seong (China) Lee Sang-su
11-17 July	WTT Star Contender European Summer Series: Location: Budapest, Hungary; Venue: BOK Hall; Category: Star Contender; Prize: $250,000; Draws: 32MS/32WS/16MD/16WD/16XD	Score: 3–2 (11–13, 11–8, 7–11, 11–6, 11–9)	
11-17 July	WTT Star Contender European Summer Series: Location: Budapest, Hungary; Venue: BOK Hall; Category: Star Contender; Prize: $250,000; Draws: 32MS/32WS/16MD/16WD/16XD	(China) Sun Yingsha (China) Wang Manyu	(Japan) Mima Ito (Japan) Hina Hayata
11-17 July	WTT Star Contender European Summer Series: Location: Budapest, Hungary; Venue: BOK Hall; Category: Star Contender; Prize: $250,000; Draws: 32MS/32WS/16MD/16WD/16XD	Score: 3–0 (14–12, 11–6, 15–13)	
11-17 July	WTT Star Contender European Summer Series: Location: Budapest, Hungary; Venue: BOK Hall; Category: Star Contender; Prize: $250,000; Draws: 32MS/32WS/16MD/16WD/16XD	(China) Wang Chuqin (China) Wang Manyu	(Japan) Tomokazu Harimoto (Japan) Hina Hayata
11-17 July	WTT Star Contender European Summer Series: Location: Budapest, Hungary; Venue: BOK Hall; Category: Star Contender; Prize: $250,000; Draws: 32MS/32WS/16MD/16WD/16XD	Score: 3–2 (9–11, 6–11, 11–7, 11–7, 11–9)	
18-23 July	WTT Champions European Summer Series: Location: Budapest, Hungary; Venue: BOK Hall; Category: Champions; Prize: $500,000; Draws: 32MS/32WS	(Japan) Tomokazu Harimoto	(China) Lin Gaoyuan
18-23 July	WTT Champions European Summer Series: Location: Budapest, Hungary; Venue: BOK Hall; Category: Champions; Prize: $500,000; Draws: 32MS/32WS	Score: 4–3 (3–11, 7–11, 12–14, 11–6, 11–6, 13–11, 11–9)	
18-23 July	WTT Champions European Summer Series: Location: Budapest, Hungary; Venue: BOK Hall; Category: Champions; Prize: $500,000; Draws: 32MS/32WS	(China) Wang Manyu	(China) Wang Yidi
18-23 July	WTT Champions European Summer Series: Location: Budapest, Hungary; Venue: BOK Hall; Category: Champions; Prize: $500,000; Draws: 32MS/32WS	Score: 4–2 (11–9, 11–4, 9–11, 11–7, 7–11, 11–7)	

August
Date	Tournament	Champions	Runners-up
1-6 August	WTT Contender Tunis: Location: Tunis, Tunisia; Venue: Salle Omnisport de Rades; Category: Contender; Prize: $75,000; Draws: 32MS/32WS/16MD/16WD/16XD	(Brazil) hugo Calderano	(France) Alexis Lebrun
1-6 August	WTT Contender Tunis: Location: Tunis, Tunisia; Venue: Salle Omnisport de Rades; Category: Contender; Prize: $75,000; Draws: 32MS/32WS/16MD/16WD/16XD	Score: 4–1 (11–7, 11–6, 11–7, 10–12, 11–3)	
1-6 August	WTT Contender Tunis: Location: Tunis, Tunisia; Venue: Salle Omnisport de Rades; Category: Contender; Prize: $75,000; Draws: 32MS/32WS/16MD/16WD/16XD	(China) Zhang Rui	(Japan) Miwa Harimoto
1-6 August	WTT Contender Tunis: Location: Tunis, Tunisia; Venue: Salle Omnisport de Rades; Category: Contender; Prize: $75,000; Draws: 32MS/32WS/16MD/16WD/16XD	Score: 4–3 (12–14, 11–9, 11–8, 11–8, 9–11, 9–11, 13–11)	
1-6 August	WTT Contender Tunis: Location: Tunis, Tunisia; Venue: Salle Omnisport de Rades; Category: Contender; Prize: $75,000; Draws: 32MS/32WS/16MD/16WD/16XD	(Japan) Yuto Kizukuri (Japan) Tomokazu Harimoto	(China) Zhao Zihao (China) Xue Fei
1-6 August	WTT Contender Tunis: Location: Tunis, Tunisia; Venue: Salle Omnisport de Rades; Category: Contender; Prize: $75,000; Draws: 32MS/32WS/16MD/16WD/16XD	Score: 3–2 (11–4, 8–11, 7–11, 11–9, 11–6)	
1-6 August	WTT Contender Tunis: Location: Tunis, Tunisia; Venue: Salle Omnisport de Rades; Category: Contender; Prize: $75,000; Draws: 32MS/32WS/16MD/16WD/16XD	(China) Kuai Man (China) Zhang Rui	(China) He Zhuojia (China) Shi Xunyao
1-6 August	WTT Contender Tunis: Location: Tunis, Tunisia; Venue: Salle Omnisport de Rades; Category: Contender; Prize: $75,000; Draws: 32MS/32WS/16MD/16WD/16XD	Score: 3–1 (8–11, 11–2, 13–10, 11–6)	
1-6 August	WTT Contender Tunis: Location: Tunis, Tunisia; Venue: Salle Omnisport de Rades; Category: Contender; Prize: $75,000; Draws: 32MS/32WS/16MD/16WD/16XD	(Japan) Miwa Harimoto (Japan) Tomokazu Harimoto	(Chinese Taipei) Feng Yi-hsin (Chinese Taipei) Chen Szu-yu
1-6 August	WTT Contender Tunis: Location: Tunis, Tunisia; Venue: Salle Omnisport de Rades; Category: Contender; Prize: $75,000; Draws: 32MS/32WS/16MD/16WD/16XD	Score: 3–2 (9–11, 11–8, 9–11, 12–10, 11–6)	

September
Date	Tournament	Champions	Runners-up
5-10 September	WTT Contender Muscat II: Location: Muscat, Oman; Venue: Sultan Qaboos Sport Complex; Category: Contender; Prize: $75,000; Draws: 32MS/32WS/16MD/16WD/16XD	(South Korea) Jang Woo-jin	(China) Liang Yanning
5-10 September	WTT Contender Muscat II: Location: Muscat, Oman; Venue: Sultan Qaboos Sport Complex; Category: Contender; Prize: $75,000; Draws: 32MS/32WS/16MD/16WD/16XD	Score: 4–3 (9–11, 11–6, 7–11, 11–8, 4–11, 11–9, 11–4)	
5-10 September	WTT Contender Muscat II: Location: Muscat, Oman; Venue: Sultan Qaboos Sport Complex; Category: Contender; Prize: $75,000; Draws: 32MS/32WS/16MD/16WD/16XD	(China) Chen Xingtong	(South Korea) Choi Hyo-joo
5-10 September	WTT Contender Muscat II: Location: Muscat, Oman; Venue: Sultan Qaboos Sport Complex; Category: Contender; Prize: $75,000; Draws: 32MS/32WS/16MD/16WD/16XD	Score: 4–0 (11–8, 11–2, 11–8, 11–9)	
5-10 September	WTT Contender Muscat II: Location: Muscat, Oman; Venue: Sultan Qaboos Sport Complex; Category: Contender; Prize: $75,000; Draws: 32MS/32WS/16MD/16WD/16XD	(China) Sai Linwei (China) Niu Guankai	(South Korea) Lee Sang-su (South Korea) An Jae-hyun
5-10 September	WTT Contender Muscat II: Location: Muscat, Oman; Venue: Sultan Qaboos Sport Complex; Category: Contender; Prize: $75,000; Draws: 32MS/32WS/16MD/16WD/16XD	Score: 3–0 (11–3, 17–15, 13–11)	
5-10 September	WTT Contender Muscat II: Location: Muscat, Oman; Venue: Sultan Qaboos Sport Complex; Category: Contender; Prize: $75,000; Draws: 32MS/32WS/16MD/16WD/16XD	(China) Qian Tianyi (China) Chen Xingtong	(United States) Lily Zhang (Slovakia) Barbora Balazova
5-10 September	WTT Contender Muscat II: Location: Muscat, Oman; Venue: Sultan Qaboos Sport Complex; Category: Contender; Prize: $75,000; Draws: 32MS/32WS/16MD/16WD/16XD	Score: 3–0 (11–9, 11–9, 11–9)	
5-10 September	WTT Contender Muscat II: Location: Muscat, Oman; Venue: Sultan Qaboos Sport Complex; Category: Contender; Prize: $75,000; Draws: 32MS/32WS/16MD/16WD/16XD	(China) Liu Yebo (China) Chen Xingtong	(China) Xu Haidong (China) Wu Yangchen
5-10 September	WTT Contender Muscat II: Location: Muscat, Oman; Venue: Sultan Qaboos Sport Complex; Category: Contender; Prize: $75,000; Draws: 32MS/32WS/16MD/16WD/16XD	Score: 3–1 (10–12, 11–5, 11–7, 12–10)	
13-18 September	WTT Contender Almaty: Location: Almaty, Kazakhstan; Venue: Table Tennis Centre ADD; Category: Contender; Prize: $75,000; Draws: 32MS/32WS/16MD/16WD/16XD	(Germany) Ruwen Filus	(Chinese Taipei) Lin Yun-ju
13-18 September	WTT Contender Almaty: Location: Almaty, Kazakhstan; Venue: Table Tennis Centre ADD; Category: Contender; Prize: $75,000; Draws: 32MS/32WS/16MD/16WD/16XD	Score: 4–3 (7–11, 10–12, 7–11, 11–7, 11–9, 11–5, 11–7)	
13-18 September	WTT Contender Almaty: Location: Almaty, Kazakhstan; Venue: Table Tennis Centre ADD; Category: Contender; Prize: $75,000; Draws: 32MS/32WS/16MD/16WD/16XD	(Japan) Hina Hayata	(Portugal) Fu Yu
13-18 September	WTT Contender Almaty: Location: Almaty, Kazakhstan; Venue: Table Tennis Centre ADD; Category: Contender; Prize: $75,000; Draws: 32MS/32WS/16MD/16WD/16XD	Score: 4–1 (11–8, 8–11, 11–5, 11–6, 11–7)	
13-18 September	WTT Contender Almaty: Location: Almaty, Kazakhstan; Venue: Table Tennis Centre ADD; Category: Contender; Prize: $75,000; Draws: 32MS/32WS/16MD/16WD/16XD	(Chinese Taipei) Lin Yun-ju (Chinese Taipei) Liao Cheng-ting	(Sweden) Anton Kallberg (Sweden) Mattias Falck
13-18 September	WTT Contender Almaty: Location: Almaty, Kazakhstan; Venue: Table Tennis Centre ADD; Category: Contender; Prize: $75,000; Draws: 32MS/32WS/16MD/16WD/16XD	Score: 3–2 (7–11, 9–11, 11–7, 11–5, 11–1)	
13-18 September	WTT Contender Almaty: Location: Almaty, Kazakhstan; Venue: Table Tennis Centre ADD; Category: Contender; Prize: $75,000; Draws: 32MS/32WS/16MD/16WD/16XD	(Japan) Miu Hirano (Japan) Hina Hayata	(South Korea) Choi Hyo-joo (South Korea) Shin Yu-bin
13-18 September	WTT Contender Almaty: Location: Almaty, Kazakhstan; Venue: Table Tennis Centre ADD; Category: Contender; Prize: $75,000; Draws: 32MS/32WS/16MD/16WD/16XD	Score: 3–0 (11–8, 11–5, 11–6)	
13-18 September	WTT Contender Almaty: Location: Almaty, Kazakhstan; Venue: Table Tennis Centre ADD; Category: Contender; Prize: $75,000; Draws: 32MS/32WS/16MD/16WD/16XD	(Chinese Taipei) Lin Yun-ju (Chinese Taipei) Chen Szu-yu	(China) Xu Haidong (China) Wu Yangchen
13-18 September	WTT Contender Almaty: Location: Almaty, Kazakhstan; Venue: Table Tennis Centre ADD; Category: Contender; Prize: $75,000; Draws: 32MS/32WS/16MD/16WD/16XD	Score: 3–2 (11–7, 11–13, 17–15, 7–11, 11–6)	

October
Date	Tournament	Champions	Runners-up
19-23 October	Champions Macao: Location: Macao, China; Venue: Tap Seac Multisport Pavilion; Category: Champions; Prize: $800,000; Draws: 32MS/32WS	(China) Wang Chuqin	(China) Fan Zhendong
19-23 October	Champions Macao: Location: Macao, China; Venue: Tap Seac Multisport Pavilion; Category: Champions; Prize: $800,000; Draws: 32MS/32WS	Score: 4–3 (11–5, 12–14, 12–10, 8–11, 11–1, 9–11, 11–8)	
19-23 October	Champions Macao: Location: Macao, China; Venue: Tap Seac Multisport Pavilion; Category: Champions; Prize: $800,000; Draws: 32MS/32WS	(China) Sun Yingsha	(China) Chen Xingtong
19-23 October	Champions Macao: Location: Macao, China; Venue: Tap Seac Multisport Pavilion; Category: Champions; Prize: $800,000; Draws: 32MS/32WS	Score: 4–1 (12–10, 11–8, 5–11, 11–6, 12–10)	
27-30 October	WTT Cup Finals: Location: Xinxiang, China; Venue: Xinxiang Pingyuan Sports Center; Category: Finals; Prize: $1,000,000; Draws: 16MS/16WS	(China) Wang Chuqin	(Japan) Tomokazu Harimoto
27-30 October	WTT Cup Finals: Location: Xinxiang, China; Venue: Xinxiang Pingyuan Sports Center; Category: Finals; Prize: $1,000,000; Draws: 16MS/16WS	Score: 4–2 (8–11, 11–8, 11–9, 11–8, 8–11, 11–7)	
27-30 October	WTT Cup Finals: Location: Xinxiang, China; Venue: Xinxiang Pingyuan Sports Center; Category: Finals; Prize: $1,000,000; Draws: 16MS/16WS	(China) Sun Yingsha	(China) Chen Meng
27-30 October	WTT Cup Finals: Location: Xinxiang, China; Venue: Xinxiang Pingyuan Sports Center; Category: Finals; Prize: $1,000,000; Draws: 16MS/16WS	Score: 4–3 (4–11, 11–4, 11–8, 12–10, 6–11, 10–12, 12–10)	
31 October - 6 November	WTT Contender Nova Gorica: Location: Nova Gorica, Slovenia; Venue: Primary School Milojka Strukelj; Category: Contender; Prize: $75,000; Draws: 32MS/32WS/16MD/16WD/16XD	(Japan) Hiroto Shinozuka	(Slovenia) Darko Jorgic
31 October - 6 November	WTT Contender Nova Gorica: Location: Nova Gorica, Slovenia; Venue: Primary School Milojka Strukelj; Category: Contender; Prize: $75,000; Draws: 32MS/32WS/16MD/16WD/16XD	Score: 4–3 (13–11, 11–7, 6–11, 5–11, 9–11, 12–10, 11–6)	
31 October - 6 November	WTT Contender Nova Gorica: Location: Nova Gorica, Slovenia; Venue: Primary School Milojka Strukelj; Category: Contender; Prize: $75,000; Draws: 32MS/32WS/16MD/16WD/16XD	(South Korea) Shin Yu-bin	(Monaco) Xiaoxin Yang
31 October - 6 November	WTT Contender Nova Gorica: Location: Nova Gorica, Slovenia; Venue: Primary School Milojka Strukelj; Category: Contender; Prize: $75,000; Draws: 32MS/32WS/16MD/16WD/16XD	Score: 4–3 (11–6, 12–10, 11–2, 10–12, 9–11, 6–11, 11–6)	
31 October - 6 November	WTT Contender Nova Gorica: Location: Nova Gorica, Slovenia; Venue: Primary School Milojka Strukelj; Category: Contender; Prize: $75,000; Draws: 32MS/32WS/16MD/16WD/16XD	(Japan) Shunsuke Togami (Japan) Hiroto Shinozuka	(Slovenia) Darko Jorgic (Czech Republic) Tomas Polansky
31 October - 6 November	WTT Contender Nova Gorica: Location: Nova Gorica, Slovenia; Venue: Primary School Milojka Strukelj; Category: Contender; Prize: $75,000; Draws: 32MS/32WS/16MD/16WD/16XD	Score: 3–0 (12–10, 11–9, 11–7)	
31 October - 6 November	WTT Contender Nova Gorica: Location: Nova Gorica, Slovenia; Venue: Primary School Milojka Strukelj; Category: Contender; Prize: $75,000; Draws: 32MS/32WS/16MD/16WD/16XD	(Hong Kong) Zhu Chengzhu (Hong Kong) Doo Hoi Kem	(Sweden) Linda Bergstrom (Sweden) Christina Kallberg
31 October - 6 November	WTT Contender Nova Gorica: Location: Nova Gorica, Slovenia; Venue: Primary School Milojka Strukelj; Category: Contender; Prize: $75,000; Draws: 32MS/32WS/16MD/16WD/16XD	Score: 3–0 (11–7, 11–8, 11–6)	
31 October - 6 November	WTT Contender Nova Gorica: Location: Nova Gorica, Slovenia; Venue: Primary School Milojka Strukelj; Category: Contender; Prize: $75,000; Draws: 32MS/32WS/16MD/16WD/16XD	(South Korea) Shin Yu-bin (South Korea) Lim Jong-hoon	(India) Manika Batra (India) Sathiyan Gnanasekaran
31 October - 6 November	WTT Contender Nova Gorica: Location: Nova Gorica, Slovenia; Venue: Primary School Milojka Strukelj; Category: Contender; Prize: $75,000; Draws: 32MS/32WS/16MD/16WD/16XD	Score: 3–0 (11–7, 11–7, 11–5)	

== See also ==
- 2022 WTT Feeder Series
