= 2018 China Open (table tennis) =

Tournament details
- Dates: 31 May–3 June 2018
- Competitors: 32S / 16D
- Total prize money: US$346,000
- Venue: Bao'an District Sports Center
- Location: Shenzhen, China

Champions
- Men's singles: (China) Ma Long
- Women's singles: (China) Wang Manyu
- Men's doubles: (China) Fan Zhendong (China) Lin Gaoyuan
- Women's doubles: (China) Ding Ning (China) Zhu Yuling
- Mixed doubles: (China) Lin Gaoyuan (China) Chen Xingtong

The 2018 China Open was the fifth event of the 2018 ITTF World Tour. It was the third of six top-tier Platinum events on the tour, and took place from 31 May to 3 June in Shenzhen, China.

China's Ma Long became the most successful player in the event's history, winning his seventh China Open men's singles title.

Lin Gaoyuan and Chen Xingtong of China became the first ever winners of a mixed doubles tournament at an ITTF World Tour event, with the new category being included as part of the build-up to mixed doubles featuring on the table tennis programme at the 2020 Olympics.

== Men's singles ==
=== Seeds ===
1. (China) Fan Zhendong (final)
2. (Germany) Timo Boll (second round)
3. (China) Xu Xin (first round)
4. (China) Lin Gaoyuan (semifinals)
5. (China) Ma Long (champion)
6. (Hong Kong) Wong Chun Ting (second round)
7. (South Korea) Lee Sang-su (quarterfinals)
8. (Japan) Koki Niwa (quarterfinals)
9. (France) Simon Gauzy (first round)
10. (Japan) Jun Mizutani (quarterfinals)
11. (Brazil) Hugo Calderano (first round)
12. (Japan) Tomokazu Harimoto (second round)
13. (Japan) Kenta Matsudaira (first round)
14. (Portugal) Marcos Freitas (first round)
15. (Chinese Taipei) Chuang Chih-yuan (second round)
16. (Egypt) Omar Assar (first round)

=== Draw ===
==== Top half ====
First round
1	(China) Fan Zhendong	5	11	11	13	9	11
(South Korea) Jung Young-sik	11	5	2	11	11	8
(France) Emmanuel Lebesson	9	11	11	11	11
16	(Egypt) Omar Assar	11	9	4	8	3
11	(Brazil) Hugo Calderano	9	7	11	12	6
(England) Liam Pitchford	11	11	13	10	11
(Slovenia) Bojan Tokič	7	6	9	11	11	9
8	(Japan) Koki Niwa	11	11	11	4	6	11
6	(Hong Kong) Wong Chun Ting	7	8	11	11	11	11
(Austria) Robert Gardos	11	11	9	6	7	7
(Germany) Patrick Franziska	8	11	4	8	3
10	(Japan) Jun Mizutani	11	6	11	11	11
12	(Japan) Tomokazu Harimoto	11	11	11	11
(China) Zhang Jike	8	3	8	6
(South Korea) Jeong Sang-eun	3	9	6	6
4	(China) Lin Gaoyuan	11	11	11	11

Second round
1	(China) Fan Zhendong	12	11	11	11
(France) Emmanuel Lebesson	10	5	8	7
(England) Liam Pitchford	8	11	6	9	13	12	9
8	(Japan) Koki Niwa	11	8	11	11	11	10	11
6	(Hong Kong) Wong Chun Ting	8	11	8	13	9	11	9
10	(Japan) Jun Mizutani	11	6	11	11	11	9	11
12	(Japan) Tomokazu Harimoto	2	8	10	11	4
4	(China) Lin Gaoyuan	11	11	12	7	11

Quarterfinals
1	(China) Fan Zhendong	11	11	12	9	11
8	(Japan) Koki Niwa	9	6	10	11	3
10	(Japan) Jun Mizutani	11	4	11	7	14	3	8
4	(China) Lin Gaoyuan	9	11	8	11	12	11	11

Semifinals
1	(China) Fan Zhendong	13	11	12	9	8	11
4	(China) Lin Gaoyuan	11	6	10	11	11	6

==== Bottom half ====
First round
3	(China) Xu Xin	7	11	6	7	6
(South Korea) Lim Jong-hoon	11	9	11	11	11
(Sweden) Kristian Karlsson	9	11	4	7	3
15	(Chinese Taipei) Chuang Chih-yuan	11	9	11	11	11
14	(Portugal) Marcos Freitas	6	14	3	6	7
(South Korea) Jang Woo-jin	11	12	11	11	11
(Japan) Yuya Oshima	12	7	11	7	13
7	(South Korea) Lee Sang-su	14	11	9	11	15
5	(China) Ma Long	11	11	11	11
(Chinese Taipei) Lin Yun-ju	5	8	9	5
(China) Wang Chuqin	12	6	7	11	11	8	11
13	(Japan) Kenta Matsudaira	10	11	11	9	8	11	4
9	(France) Simon Gauzy	3	2	9	9
(China) Liang Jingkun	11	11	11	11
(Slovenia) Darko Jorgić	7	11	9	5	7
2	(Germany) Timo Boll	11	9	11	11	11

Second round
(South Korea) Lim Jong-hoon	11	14	11	11	11
15	(Chinese Taipei) Chuang Chih-yuan	8	12	13	6	7
(South Korea) Jang Woo-jin	8	7	12	7	6
7	(South Korea) Lee Sang-su	11	11	10	11	11
5	(China) Ma Long	9	11	11	11	11
(China) Wang Chuqin	11	3	7	9	8
(China) Liang Jingkun	5	11	12	7	4	11	11
2	(Germany) Timo Boll	11	9	10	11	11	9	5

Quarterfinals
(South Korea) Lim Jong-hoon	11	11	11	11
7	(South Korea) Lee Sang-su	9	9	5	6
5	(China) Ma Long	11	7	12	11	8	11	11
(China) Liang Jingkun	13	11	10	9	11	3	6

Semifinals
(South Korea) Lim Jong-hoon	9	3	4	12	2
5	(China) Ma Long	11	11	11	10	11

==== Finals ====
Semifinals								Final
1	(China) Fan Zhendong	13	11	12	9	8	11
4	(China) Lin Gaoyuan	11	6	10	11	11	6	1	(China) Fan Zhendong	11	8	4	3	12
	(South Korea) Lim Jong-hoon	9	3	4	12	2		5	(China) Ma Long	7	11	11	11	14
5	(China) Ma Long	11	11	11	10	11

== Women's singles ==
=== Seeds ===
1. (China) Zhu Yuling (second round)
2. (Japan) Kasumi Ishikawa (quarterfinals)
3. (Singapore) Feng Tianwei (second round)
4. (China) Wang Manyu (champion)
5. (Japan) Miu Hirano (first round)
6. (Japan) Mima Ito (semifinals)
7. (Chinese Taipei) Cheng I-ching (first round)
8. (China) Chen Xingtong (second round)
9. (China) Ding Ning (final)
10. (South Korea) Seo Hyo-won (first round)
11. (Japan) Hitomi Sato (quarterfinals)
12. (Chinese Taipei) Chen Szu-yu (first round)
13. (China) Sun Yingsha (first round)
14. (Hong Kong) Lee Ho Ching (first round)
15. (Hong Kong) Doo Hoi Kem (second round)
16. (Japan) Hina Hayata (second round)

=== Draw ===
==== Top half ====
First round
1	(China) Zhu Yuling	11	11	6	11	11
(Japan) Minami Ando	4	6	11	8	7
(Japan) Saki Shibata	11	11	11	11
10	(South Korea) Seo Hyo-won	7	9	8	9
15	(Hong Kong) Doo Hoi Kem	12	12	12	11	16
(Japan) Miyu Kato	10	10	14	7	14
(South Korea) Jeon Ji-hee	14	7	6	11	11	8	17
7	(Chinese Taipei) Cheng I-ching	12	11	11	9	9	11	15
5	(Japan) Miu Hirano	10	11	7	5	14	2
(China) Gu Yuting	12	6	11	11	12	11
(China) Che Xiaoxi	9	10	16	7	9
9	(China) Ding Ning	11	12	14	11	11
11	(Japan) Hitomi Sato	11	11	14	8	5	14
(Singapore) Lin Ye	6	7	12	11	11	12
(South Korea) Ji Eun-chae	3	2	7	7
3	(Singapore) Feng Tianwei	11	11	11	11

Second round
1	(China) Zhu Yuling	11	9	11	11	9	8	5
(Japan) Saki Shibata	5	11	7	8	11	11	11
15	(Hong Kong) Doo Hoi Kem	11	8	7	11	8	11
(South Korea) Jeon Ji-hee	4	11	11	8	11	13
(China) Gu Yuting	5	9	10	11	11	10
9	(China) Ding Ning	11	11	12	8	9	12
11	(Japan) Hitomi Sato	11	10	11	15	14
3	(Singapore) Feng Tianwei	8	12	6	13	12

Quarterfinals
(Japan) Saki Shibata	17	15	7	12	11
(South Korea) Jeon Ji-hee	15	13	11	10	5
9	(China) Ding Ning	11	11	11	11
11	(Japan) Hitomi Sato	7	3	7	5

Semifinals
(Japan) Saki Shibata	2	7	9	6
9	(China) Ding Ning	11	11	11	11

==== Bottom half ====
First round
4	(China) Wang Manyu	10	11	11	11	11
(Japan) Honoka Hashimoto	12	1	5	9	4
(South Korea) Yang Ha-eun	11	11	13	9	8	11
14	(Hong Kong) Lee Ho Ching	8	9	11	11	11	7
12	(Chinese Taipei) Chen Szu-yu	6	7	3	7
(Germany) Han Ying	11	11	11	11
(Austria) Sofia Polcanova	6	9	2	6
8	(China) Chen Xingtong	11	11	11	11
6	(Japan) Mima Ito	11	11	12	11
(China) Wu Yang	7	3	10	8
(Austria) Amelie Solja	6	4	8	8
16	(Japan) Hina Hayata	11	11	11	11
13	(China) Sun Yingsha	11	11	11	6	6	8	5
(Japan) Yui Hamamoto	8	4	5	11	11	11	11
(Germany) Petrissa Solja	11	8	9	8	11	1
2	(Japan) Kasumi Ishikawa	5	11	11	11	9	11

Second round
4	(China) Wang Manyu	11	11	11	11
(South Korea) Yang Ha-eun	4	8	5	4
(Germany) Han Ying	11	11	11	11
8	(China) Chen Xingtong	7	4	5	8
6	(Japan) Mima Ito	10	14	11	7	13	7	12
16	(Japan) Hina Hayata	12	12	4	11	11	11	10
(Japan) Yui Hamamoto	10	5	6	5
2	(Japan) Kasumi Ishikawa	12	11	11	11

Quarterfinals
4	(China) Wang Manyu	11	11	14	6	11
(Germany) Han Ying	8	6	12	11	4
6	(Japan) Mima Ito	11	8	12	11	3	11
2	(Japan) Kasumi Ishikawa	2	11	10	8	11	7

Semifinals
4	(China) Wang Manyu	11	12	11	10	11
6	(Japan) Mima Ito	8	10	5	12	8

==== Finals ====
Semifinals							Final
	(Japan) Saki Shibata	2	7	9	6
9	(China) Ding Ning	11	11	11	11		9	(China) Ding Ning	11	11	11	9	8	11	5
4	(China) Wang Manyu	11	12	11	10	11	4	(China) Wang Manyu	13	9	9	11	11	9	11
6	(Japan) Mima Ito	8	10	5	12	8

== Men's doubles ==
=== Seeds ===
1. (Hong Kong) Ho Kwan Kit / Wong Chun Ting (first round)
2. (South Korea) Jung Young-sik / Lee Sang-su (first round)
3. (China) Ma Long / Xu Xin (semifinals)
4. (Germany) Patrick Franziska / (Denmark) Jonathan Groth (first round)
5. (Japan) Masataka Morizono / Yuya Oshima (quarterfinals)
6. (China) Fan Zhendong / Lin Gaoyuan (champions)
7. (Japan) Tomokazu Harimoto / Jin Ueda (first round)
8. (Germany) Ruwen Filus / Ricardo Walther (first round)

=== Draw ===
First round
1	(Hong Kong) Ho / Wong	8	9	7
(Austria) Fegerl / (Portugal) Monteiro	11	11	11
(Hong Kong) Lam / Ng	11	2	8	11	5
6	(China) Fan / Lin	4	11	11	9	11
5	(Japan) Morizono / Oshima	11	11	11
(Slovakia) Pištej / (England) Pitchford	6	7	3
(South Korea) Jang / Lim	11	10	9	11	11
4	(Germany) Franziska / (Denmark) Groth	8	12	11	4	7
3	(China) Ma / Xu	11	11	11
(Chinese Taipei) Chen / Chuang	9	9	9
(Chinese Taipei) Liao / Lin	12	11	12
8	(Germany) Filus / Walther	10	6	10
7	(Japan) Harimoto / Ueda	11	8	12	5
(Romania) Ionescu / (Spain) Robles	7	11	14	11
(France) Cassin / Lebesson	11	7	9	11	11
2	(South Korea) Jung / Lee	7	11	11	3	7

Quarterfinals
(Austria) Fegerl / (Portugal) Monteiro
6	(China) Fan / Lin	w/o
5	(Japan) Morizono / Oshima	11	7	11	8	9
(South Korea) Jang / Lim	9	11	8	11	11
3	(China) Ma / Xu	12	11	13
(Chinese Taipei) Liao / Lin	10	4	11
(Romania) Ionescu / (Spain) Robles	8	11	12	11
(France) Cassin / Lebesson	11	6	10	7

Semifinals
6	(China) Fan / Lin	11	6	3	11	14
(South Korea) Jang / Lim	5	11	11	6	12
3	(China) Ma / Xu	9	9	11	11	10
(Romania) Ionescu / (Spain) Robles	11	11	4	4	12

Final
6	(China) Fan / Lin	11	11	11
(Romania) Ionescu / (Spain) Robles	9	4	4

== Women's doubles ==
=== Seeds ===
1. (Japan) Hina Hayata / Mima Ito (semifinals)
2. (Hong Kong) Doo Hoi Kem / Lee Ho Ching (first round)
3. (South Korea) Jeon Ji-hee / Yang Ha-eun (final)
4. (China) Chen Xingtong / Sun Yingsha (quarterfinals)
5. (China) Ding Ning / Zhu Yuling (champions)
6. (Hong Kong) Ng Wing Nam / Soo Wai Yam Minnie (quarterfinals)
7. (Spain) Maria Xiao / (Canada) Zhang Mo (first round)
8. (Japan) Miu Hirano / Kasumi Ishikawa (semifinals)

=== Draw ===
First round
1	(Japan) Hayata / Ito	w/o
(Romania) Szőcs / (Monaco) Yang
(Germany) Han / (Poland) Li	7	10	11
6	(Hong Kong) Ng / Soo	11	12	13
5	(China) Ding / Zhu	11	11	11
(Indonesia) Dwijayanti / Indriani	4	9	9
(Indonesia) Oktariyani / Sintya	5	7	6
4	(China) Chen / Sun	11	11	11
3	(South Korea) Jeon / Yang	11	11	11
(South Korea) Choi / Jung	7	8	4
(Chinese Taipei) Cheng / Liu	11	7	11	1	11
7	(Spain) Xiao / (Canada) Zhang	7	11	8	11	7
8	(Japan) Hirano / Ishikawa	12	11	11
(Singapore) Zeng / Zhou	10	9	9
(Singapore) Lin / Yu	11	6	11	9	11
2	(Hong Kong) Doo / Lee	8	11	8	11	6

Quarterfinals
1	(Japan) Hayata / Ito	7	11	11	11
6	(Hong Kong) Ng / Soo	11	7	7	8
5	(China) Ding / Zhu	11	11	11	11
4	(China) Chen / Sun	13	9	9	4
3	(South Korea) Jeon / Yang	11	11	11
(Chinese Taipei) Cheng / Liu	5	7	4
8	(Japan) Hirano / Ishikawa	11	11	7	11
(Singapore) Lin / Yu	2	6	11	7

Semifinals
1	(Japan) Hayata / Ito	9	11	11	5	6
5	(China) Ding / Zhu	11	8	6	11	11
3	(South Korea) Jeon / Yang	11	5	8	11	12
8	(Japan) Hirano / Ishikawa	8	11	11	7	10

Final
5	(China) Ding / Zhu	11	11	4	11
3	(South Korea) Jeon / Yang	9	5	11	5

== Mixed doubles ==
=== Seeds ===
1. (Japan) Masataka Morizono / Mima Ito (final)
2. (Hong Kong) Wong Chun Ting / Doo Hoi Kem (quarterfinals)
3. (Chinese Taipei) Chen Chien-an / Cheng I-ching (quarterfinals)
4. (South Korea) Lee Sang-su / Jeon Ji-hee (semifinals)
5. (Hong Kong) Ho Kwan Kit / Lee Ho Ching (first round)
6. (China) Lin Gaoyuan / Chen Xingtong (champions)
7. (South Korea) Lim Jong-hoon / Yang Ha-eun (semifinals)
8. (Germany) Patrick Franziska / Petrissa Solja (quarterfinals)

=== Draw ===
First round
1	(Japan) Morizono / Ito	11	12	11
(Germany) Filus / Han	6	10	4
(Spain) Robles / Dvorak	8	12	11	12
8	(Germany) Franziska / Solja	11	14	8	14
7	(South Korea) Lim / Yang	11	11	14
(Chinese Taipei) Chuang / Chen	4	5	12
(Slovakia) Pištej / Balážová	4	3	12	11
3	(Chinese Taipei) Chen / Cheng	11	11	10	13
4	(South Korea) Lee / Jeon	11	11	8	11
(Austria) Fegerl / Polcanova	7	7	11	8
(China) Zhang / Wang	7	11	9	11	11
5	(Hong Kong) Ho / Lee	11	9	11	6	8
6	(China) Lin / Chen	11	11	11
(Belgium) Nuytinck / Lung	3	3	7
(Romania) Ionescu / Szőcs	11	5	11	6	9
2	(Hong Kong) Wong / Doo	9	11	9	11	11

Quarterfinals
1	(Japan) Morizono / Ito	11	11	11
8	(Germany) Franziska / Solja	8	8	3
7	(South Korea) Lim / Yang	11	11	11
3	(Chinese Taipei) Chen / Cheng	5	5	3
4	(South Korea) Lee / Jeon	7	11	11	9	12
(China) Zhang / Wang	11	8	8	11	10
6	(China) Lin / Chen	11	11	11
2	(Hong Kong) Wong / Doo	2	8	3

Semifinals
1	(Japan) Morizono / Ito	11	12	11
7	(South Korea) Lim / Yang	7	10	5
4	(South Korea) Lee / Jeon	3	7	11	8
6	(China) Lin / Chen	11	11	4	11

Final
1	(Japan) Morizono / Ito	11	11	5	8
6	(China) Lin / Chen	13	7	11	11
