= Wang Manyu =

Chinese table tennis player (born 1999)

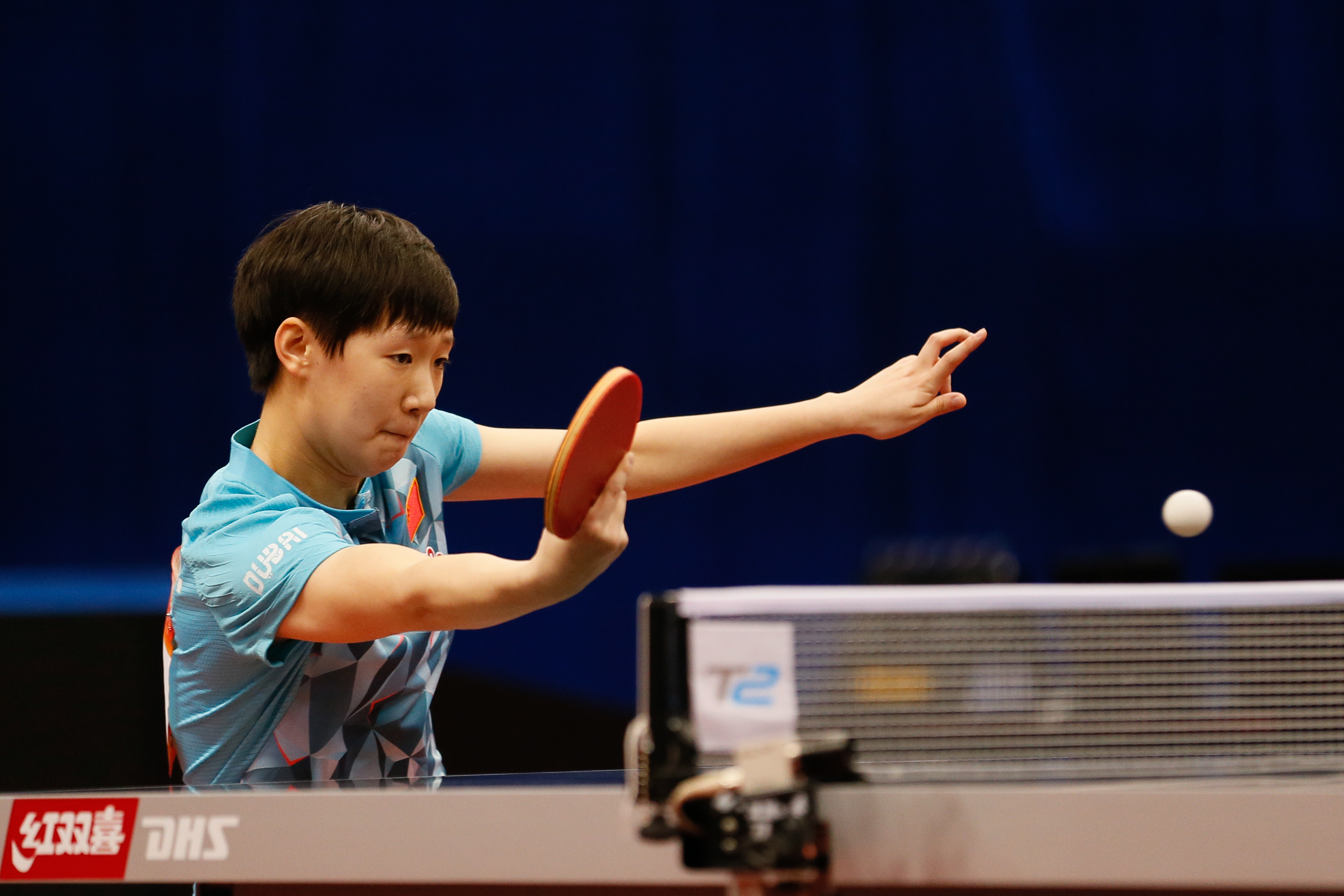
- Wang in 2017

Personal information
- Native name: 王曼昱
- Born: 9 February 1999 (age 27) Qiqihar, Heilongjiang, China
- Height: 1.76 m (5 ft 9 in)

Sport
- Sport: Table tennis
- Club: Shandong Luneng (CTTSL)
- Playing style: Right-handed, shakehand grip
- Highest ranking: 1 (September 2026)
- Current ranking: 1 (12 October 2026)
Medal record
Women's table tennis
Representing China
Event	1st	2nd	3rd
Olympic Games	2	0	0
World Championships	8	1	2
Total	10	1	2
Olympic Games
Gold medal – first place	2020 Tokyo	Team
Gold medal – first place	2024 Paris	Team
World Championships
Gold medal – first place	2018 Halmstad	Team
Gold medal – first place	2019 Budapest	Doubles
Gold medal – first place	2021 Houston	Singles
Gold medal – first place	2021 Houston	Doubles
Gold medal – first place	2022 Chengdu	Team
Gold medal – first place	2024 Busan	Team
Gold medal – first place	2025 Doha	Doubles
Gold medal – first place	2026 London	Team
Silver medal – second place	2025 Doha	Singles
Bronze medal – third place	2019 Budapest	Singles
Bronze medal – third place	2023 Durban	Doubles
World Cup
Gold medal – first place	2023 Chengdu	Mixed team
Gold medal – first place	2024 Chengdu	Mixed team
Gold medal – first place	2025 Chengdu	Mixed team
Silver medal – second place	2024 Macao	Singles
Silver medal – second place	2026 Macao	Singles
WTT Cup Finals
Gold medal – first place	2023 Nagoya	Doubles
Gold medal – first place	2025 Hong Kong	Singles
Bronze medal – third place	2022 Xinxiang	Singles
Asian Games
Gold medal – first place	2018 Jakarta	Singles
Gold medal – first place	2018 Jakarta	Team
Gold medal – first place	2022 Hangzhou	Team
Gold medal – first place	2026 Aichi-Nagoya	Singles
Gold medal – first place	2026 Aichi-Nagoya	Doubles
Gold medal – first place	2026 Aichi-Nagoya	Team
Silver medal – second place	2018 Jakarta	Mixed doubles
Asian Championships
Gold medal – first place	2019 Yogyakarta	Team
Gold medal – first place	2023 Pyeongchang	Singles
Gold medal – first place	2023 Pyeongchang	Doubles
Gold medal – first place	2023 Pyeongchang	Team
Gold medal – first place	2025 Bhubaneswar	Team
Silver medal – second place	2017 Wuxi	Doubles
Silver medal – second place	2019 Yogyakarta	Doubles
Bronze medal – third place	2017 Wuxi	Mixed doubles
Asian Cup
Gold medal – first place	2025 Shenzhen	Singles
Silver medal – second place	2026 Haikou	Singles
National Games of China
Gold medal – first place	2017 Tianjin	Mixed doubles
Gold medal – first place	2021 Shaanxi	Doubles
Gold medal – first place	2021 Shaanxi	Singles
Gold medal – first place	2025 Guangdong, HK & Macau	Singles
Silver medal – second place	2021 Shaanxi	Mixed doubles

Wang Manyu (Chinese: 王曼昱; pinyin: Wáng Mànyù, born 9 February 1999) is a Chinese table tennis player and World Champion. She is the current world No. 1 in women's singles.

Wang won women's singles titles at the World Championships, Asian Games, and Asian Championships. She also won Olympics gold medals as a member of Chinese women's team in 2021 and 2024.

== Career ==
=== 2008 ===
She was selected for the Heilongjiang Provincial Training Team in 2008.

=== 2012 ===
In July 2012, in the women's singles final of the 2012 Asian Youth Table Tennis Championships, Wang Manyu lost 1–4 to He Zhuojia and won the women's singles runner-up. In August 2012, Wang Manyu represented the Heilongjiang team in the 2012 National Junior Table Tennis Championships, and won the tenth place in the women's singles and the fourth place in the women's team.In September 2012, in the 2012 ITTF Junior Tour Chengdu Open, in the women's singles semi-finals of the junior group, Wang Manyu lost 2–3 to Chen Xingtong and missed the final.

=== 2013 ===
Joined the National Youth Team in 2013. In 2013, she won the women's team championship at the World Youth Table Tennis Championships, and in the same year she won the women's singles championship at the National Youth Table Tennis Championships.

=== 2014 ===
On June 14, in the women's doubles final of the 2014 ITTF Korea Open, Chen Ke and Wang Manyu defeated the Japanese combination of Hirano Miu and Ito Mima 3–0 to win the women's doubles championship. In September, in the women's team final of the Asian Youth Table Tennis Championships, Wang Manyu defeated Mori Sakuramori 3–1, and the Chinese team finally defeated the Japanese team 3–1 to win the women's team championship.

=== 2015 ===
In September 2015, in the women's singles final of the 2015 National Youth Table Tennis Championships, Wang Manyu defeated Chen Xingtong 3–4 to win the women's singles runner-up.

Joined the National First Team in 2016. On September 3, 2017, she won the mixed doubles championship in table tennis at the 13th National Games. 2018 began with Wang Manyu defeating world number one Chen Meng in the Hungarian Open Quarterfinals before going on to win the championship with wins against Chen Xingtong in the semi-finals and Sun Yingsha in the finals. In March, Wang Manyu was selected for the 2018 World Team Table Tennis Championships women's team after placing second in the team qualifiers. After a successful WTTC, Wang defeated Chen Xingtong in the Hong Kong Open women's singles final followed by victory against Ding Ning in the China Open women's singles final.

=== 2016 ===
In May 2016, in the promotion and relegation match between the first and second women's table tennis teams, Wang Manyu was promoted to the national first team with a perfect record. On September 26, in the mixed doubles semifinals of the 2016 National Table Tennis Championships, Wang Manyu and Yu Ziyang lost 1–4 to Ma Long and Ding Ning and won the third place; on September 27, in the women's doubles semifinals, Wang Manyu and Che Xiaoxi lost 3–4 to Wen Jia and Chen Xingtong and won the third place. On September 28, in the women's singles semi-finals, Wang Manyu lost 3–4 to Wu Yang and won the third place.

=== 2017 ===
On February 27, 2017, in the women's singles final of the Qatar Table Tennis Open, Wang Manyu lost 1–4 to her teammate Chen Meng and won the women's singles runner-up; in the women's doubles final, Wang Manyu and Chen Meng defeated Tian Zhixi and Liang Xiaying 3–1 to win the women's doubles championship. On April 16, in the women's doubles final, Wang Manyu and Chen Ke lost 1–3 to Zhu Yuling and Chen Meng and finished second. In May, the Chinese women's table tennis team announced the results of the competition for the women's team coach in the new Olympic cycle.

Wang Manyu then decided to play under legendary coach Xiao Zhan. On June 21, in the women's singles semi-finals of the Japan Open, Wang Manyu lost 0–4 to Sun Yingsha and missed the final. On September 1, in the women's table tennis team final of the 13th National Games in 2017, Wang Manyu's Heilongjiang team lost 1–3 to the Sichuan team and won the runner-up. On September 4, in the 1st and 4th finals of the women's singles at the 13th National Games, Wang Manyu lost 3–4 to Zhu Yuling and missed the semifinals.

In November, in the women's singles quarter-finals of the German Open, Wang Manyu lost 2:4 to Zhu Yuling and was eliminated in the quarterfinals. On December 3, in the mixed doubles final of the 2017 World Youth Championships, Wang Manyu/Xue Fei defeated the Korean combination Ahn Jae-hyun/Kim Ji-ho 4–1 to win the mixed doubles championship; in the women's doubles final, Wang Manyu/Qian Tianyi lost 3–4 to their teammates Shi Xunyao/Sun Yingsha and won the women's doubles runner-up.

=== 2018 ===
On February 11, in the 2017–2018 season of the Chinese Table Tennis Super League, Wang Manyu won two points on behalf of the Jilin Changbaishan team. In the end, Jilin Changbaishan won 3–1 against Beijing Shougang and won the third place in the women's team this season with a total score of 31 points. On February 25, in the women's team final of the 2018 ITTF Team World Cup held in London, the Chinese team composed of Ding Ning, Wang Manyu, Chen Xingtong, Zhu Yuling and Liu Shiwen defeated the Japanese team 3–0 to win the championship.

=== 2019 ===
On January 19, 2019, in the women's singles semi-finals of the 2019 ITTF World Tour Hungarian Open, Wang Manyu lost 1–4 to Chen Meng and won the third place. On January 20, at the 2019 ITTF World Tour Hungarian Open, Wang Manyu/Zhu Yuling defeated Chen Meng/Sun Yingsha 3–1 in the final to win the women's doubles championship. On February 2, in the 2018-2019 Chinese Table Tennis Super League women's team final, Luneng Weifang defeated Shenzhen University 3–0, and Wang Manyu won the Table Tennis Super League women's team championship for the first time. On March 31, in the women's doubles final of the ITTF Qatar Open, Sun Yingsha/Wang Manyu defeated Ding Ning and Wang Yidi 3–2 to win the women's doubles championship. On April 28, at the 2019 Budapest World Table Tennis Championships, Sun Yingsha/Wang Manyu defeated the Japanese combination of Hina Hayata and Mima Ito 4–2 to win the women's doubles championship. On July 13, in the women's doubles final of the 2019 Australian Open, Wang Manyu/Chen Meng defeated Tian Zhixi/Liang Xiaying 3–1 to win the women's doubles championship. On October 6, the 2019 ITTF Swedish Open continued in Stockholm. In the women's singles quarter-finals, Wang Manyu lost 1–4 to Japan's Ito Mima and missed the semi-finals. On October 7, the Chinese team's entry list for the 2019 Table Tennis World Cup was released, and Wang Manyu was selected. On November 10, in the 2019 Table Tennis World Cup women's team final, the Chinese team defeated the Japanese team 3–0. Wang Manyu was with the team and won the ninth consecutive championship.

=== 2021 ===
In May, Wang was selected as a reserve for the Chinese National Team at the 2020 Tokyo Olympics. Shortly after, she won the second leg of the Chinese Olympic Scrimmage, defeating Olympic women's singles representatives Chen Meng and Sun Yingsha in the process. Wang again beat both Chen and Sun in a closed-door scrimmage in June.

Wang Manyu played in the team event of the Tokyo Olympics because of Liu Shiwen's withdrawal due to an elbow injury. Wang and her team scored a 3–0 victory over Japan to win gold and continuing China's undefeated streak in the Women's team event.

In September, Wang reached the quarter-finals of the China National Games after a tiring win against chopper Liu Fei. Despite getting injured the day before the semi-finals and finals, Wang defeated both Olympic finalists Chen Meng and Sun Yingsha 4-0 the next day to win the women's singles gold medal.

== Singles titles ==
Year	Tournament	Final opponent	Score	Ref
2017	ITTF World Tour Platinum, Austrian Open	(China) Gu Yuting	4–0	
2018	ITTF World Tour, Hungarian Open	(China) Sun Yingsha	4–3	
2018	ITTF World Tour, Hong Kong Open	(China) Chen Xingtong	4–2	
2018	ITTF World Tour Platinum, China Open	(China) Ding Ning	4–3	
2018	Asian Games	(China) Chen Meng	4–3	
2019	ITTF World Tour Platinum, Qatar Open	(China) Liu Shiwen	4–2	
2021	World Championships	(China) Sun Yingsha	4–2	
2022	WTT Champions European Summer Series	(China) Wang Yidi	4–2	
2023	WTT Champions Macao	(China) Chen Meng	4–2	
2023	Asian Championships	(China) Sun Yingsha	3–2	
2023	WTT Contender Taiyuan	(China) Wang Yidi	4–1	
2024	WTT Singapore Smash	(China) Wang Yidi	4–1	
2024	WTT Champions Frankfurt	(China) Wang Yidi	4–2	
2024	WTT Finals	(China) Chen Xingtong	4–3	
2025	Asian Cup	(China) Sun Yingsha	4–0	
2025	WTT China Smash	(China) Sun Yingsha	4–2	
2025	WTT Finals	(China) Kuai Man	4–2	
2026	WTT Europe Smash - Sweden	(China) Wang Yidi	4–2	
2026	Asian Games	(China) Sun Yingsha	4–2	
2026	WTT China Smash	(Japan) Hitomi Sato	4–0	
