= 2025 ITTF Mixed Team World Cup =

Tournament details
- Dates: 30 November - 7 December 2025
- Edition: 3rd
- Nations: 16 teams
- Venue: Sichuan Provincial Gymnasium
- Location: China Chengdu

The 2025 ITTF Mixed Team World Cup is the third edition of the ITTF Mixed Team World Cup, an international mixed-team table tennis competition organized by the International Table Tennis Federation (ITTF), held from 30 November to 7 December 2025 in Chengdu, Sichuan, China.

This marks the first Mixed Team World Cup since the mixed team event announced as an official part of the table tennis at the Summer Olympics competition program.

The ranking points for winning this Mixed Team World Cup have been increased from the previous 1,000 points to 2,500 points, distributed according to individual players' contribution based on their number of match wins.

== Competition Format ==
The tournament format remains the same as the 2024 edition, consisting of three stages:

- First Stage: Group Stage - The 16 participating teams are divided into 4 groups for round-robin play, with the top 2 teams from each group advancing to the second stage;
- Second Stage: Round-robin - The 8 qualified teams compete in a round-robin format, with the top 4 teams advancing to the third stage knockout phase. Teams that already met in the first stage will not meet again in the second stage, but results from the first stage are carried over;
- Third Stage: Knockout - The knockout stage includes semifinals and finals. The first-ranked team faces the fourth-ranked team, and the second-ranked team faces the third-ranked team in the semifinals, with winners advancing to the final.

Each team consists of 3-4 male and 3-4 female players. Each tie is played as a "first to 8 games" system within a maximum of 15 games. The match order follows: Mixed Doubles, Women's Singles, Men's Singles, Women's Doubles/Men's Doubles, Men's Doubles/Women's Doubles. Each individual match is played best of three games, and the team that first accumulates 8 game wins wins the tie, with remaining matches not played. Players who participated in mixed doubles cannot participate in subsequent singles matches. The order of the final two doubles matches is determined before the match by the captain of the lower-ranked team, choosing whether to play men's doubles or women's doubles first.

== Schedule ==
The competition begins on 30 November 2025 and lasts for 8 days. The detailed schedule is as follows:

November - December 2025
| 30 Nov (Sun) | 1 Dec (Mon) | 2 Dec (Tue) | 3 Dec (Wed) | 4 Dec (Thu) | 5 Dec (Fri) | 6 Dec (Sat) | 7 Dec (Sun) | | |
|---|---|---|---|---|---|---|---|---|---|
| Group Stage | | | Round-robin | | | | Semifinals | 3rd/4th Playoff | Final |

== Participating teams ==
According to the list released by the International Table Tennis Federation, 16 teams will participate in the 2025 Mixed Team World Cup.

| Continent | Participating Teams |
|---|---|
| Asia | China (Host), Japan, South Korea, Chinese Taipei, India, Hong Kong, China |
| Africa | Egypt |
| Europe | France, Germany, Sweden, Romania, Croatia |
| Americas | Brazil, United States, Chile |
| Oceania | Australia |

== Seeded Teams ==
| Seed | Team | Male/Female Athlete 1 | Male/Female Athlete 2 | Male/Female Athlete 3 | Male/Female Athlete 4 |
|---|---|---|---|---|---|
| 1 | China (H) | Wang Chuqin | Lin Shidong | Liang Jingkun | Xu Yingbin |
| 1 | China (H) | Sun Yingsha | Wang Manyu | Kuai Man | Wang Yidi |
| 2 | Japan | Tomokazu Harimoto | Sora Matsushima | Shunsuke Togami | Hiroto Shinozuka |
| 2 | Japan | Miwa Harimoto | Hina Hayata | Mima Ito | Satsuki Odo |
| 3 | South Korea | An Jae-hyun | Jang Woo-jin | Oh Jun-sung | Park Gang-hyeon |
| 3 | South Korea | Shin Yu-bin | Kim Na-yeong | Lee Eun-hye | Choi Hyo-joo |
| 4 | Germany | Benedikt Duda | Patrick Franziska | Dang Qiu | |
| 4 | Germany | Annette Kaufmann | Nina Mittelham | Sabine Winter | |
| 5 | Chinese Taipei | Lin Yun-ju | Kao Cheng-jui | Lin Yen-chun | Kuo Guan-hong |
| 5 | Chinese Taipei | Cheng I-ching | Huang Yu-chiao | Li Yu-jhun | Tsai Yun-en |
| 6 | France | Alexis Lebrun | Felix Lebrun | Simon Gauzy | |
| 6 | France | Yuan Jia Nan | Prithika Pavade | Charlotte Lutz | |
| 7 | Egypt | Omar Assar | Youssef Abdel-Aziz | Badr Mustafa | Mohamed El-Beiali |
| 7 | Egypt | Hana Goda | Mariam Alhodaby | Farida Badawi | Marwa Alhodaby |
| 8 | India | Manav Thakkar | Akash Pal | Sathiyan Gnanasekaran | Payas Jain |
| 8 | India | Manika Batra | Diya Chitale | Yashaswini Ghorpade | Swastika Ghosh |
| 9 | Australia | Hwan Bae | Finn Luu | Nicholas Lum | |
| 9 | Australia | Yangzi Liu | Constantina Psihogios | Jiamuwa Wu | |
| 10 | Hong Kong | Wong Chun Ting | Lam Siu Hang | Chan Ho Wah Baldwin | Choi Chun Kit |
| 10 | Hong Kong | Doo Hoi Kem | Ng Wing Lam | Su Tsz Tung | Zhu Chengzhu |
| 11 | Sweden | Mattias Falck | Anton Källberg | Kristian Karlsson | |
| 11 | Sweden | Filippa Bergand | Linda Bergström | Christina Källberg | |
| 12 | Romania | Eduard Ionescu | Ovidiu Ionescu | Iulian Chirita | Darius Movileanu |
| 12 | Romania | Bernadette Szocs | Elizabeta Samara | Andreea Dragoman | Adina Diaconu |
| 13 | Brazil | Felipe Arado | Hamilton Yamane | Lucas Romanski | |
| 13 | Brazil | Karina Shiray | Victoria Strassburger | Laura Watanabe | |
| 14 | USA | Liang Jishan | Sid Naresh | Zhang Xiangjing | Ved Sheth |
| 14 | USA | Sally Moyland | Tashiya Piyadasa | Jessica Reyes Lai | Mandy Yu |
| 15 | Chile | Nicolas Burgos | Gustavo Gomez | Alfonso Olave | |
| 15 | Chile | Daniela Ortega | Valentina Rios | Paulina Vega | |
| 16 | Croatia | Tomislav Pucar | Andrej Gacina | Ivor Ban | Frane Kojić |
| 16 | Croatia | Hana Arapović | Mateja Jeger | Ivana Malobabić | Lea Rakovac |

== Competition Process ==
=== First Stage: Group Stage ===
==== Group 1 ====
| Rank | Team | Pld | W | L | GF | GA | GD | Pts | Qualification |
|---|---|---|---|---|---|---|---|---|---|
| 1 | China (H) (1) | 3 | 3 | 0 | 24 | 1 | +23 | 6 | Advance to Round-robin |
| 2 | Hong Kong, China (10) | 3 | 2 | 1 | 17 | 12 | +5 | 5 | |
| 3 | Egypt (7) | 3 | 1 | 2 | 10 | 23 | –13 | 4 | |
| 4 | Chile (15) | 3 | 0 | 3 | 9 | 24 | –15 | 3 | |

Round-robin Results (Click to expand/collapse)

| Round | Team 1/Winner | Score | Team 2/Loser |
|---|---|---|---|
| 1 | China (1) | 8-1 | Hong Kong, China (10) |
| 1 | Egypt (7) | 8-7 | Chile (15) |
| 2 | China (1) | 8-0 | Egypt (7) |
| 2 | Hong Kong, China (10) | 8-2 | Chile (15) |
| 3 | China (1) | 8-0 | Chile (15) |
| 3 | Hong Kong, China (10) | 8-2 | Egypt (7) |

==== Group 2 ====
| Rank | Team | Pld | W | L | GF | GA | GD | Pts | Qualification |
|---|---|---|---|---|---|---|---|---|---|
| 1 | Japan (2) | 3 | 3 | 0 | 24 | 7 | +17 | 6 | Advance to Round-robin |
| 2 | Croatia (16) | 3 | 2 | 1 | 18 | 17 | +1 | 5 | Advance to Round-robin |
| 3 | Australia (9) | 3 | 1 | 2 | 12 | 21 | -9 | 4 | |
| 4 | India (8) | 3 | 0 | 3 | 15 | 24 | -9 | 3 | |

Round-robin Results (Click to expand/collapse)

| Round | Team 1/Winner | Score | Team 2/Loser |
|---|---|---|---|
| 1 | Japan (2) | 8-1 | Australia (9) |
| 1 | Croatia (16) | 8-6 | India (8) |
| 2 | Japan (2) | 8-4 | India (8) |
| 2 | Croatia (16) | 8-3 | Australia (9) |
| 3 | Japan (2) | 8-2 | Croatia (16) |
| 3 | Australia (9) | 8-5 | India (8) |

==== Group 3 ====
| Rank | Team | Pld | W | L | GF | GA | GD | Pts | Qualification |
|---|---|---|---|---|---|---|---|---|---|
| 1 | (South Korea) Korea Republic (3) | 3 | 3 | 0 | 24 | 9 | +15 | 6 | Advance to Round-robin |
| 2 | Sweden (11) | 3 | 2 | 1 | 19 | 10 | +9 | 5 | Advance to Round-robin |
| 3 | Chinese Taipei (5) | 3 | 1 | 2 | 16 | 19 | -3 | 4 | |
| 4 | United States (14) | 3 | 0 | 3 | 3 | 24 | -21 | 3 | |

Round-robin Results (Click to expand/collapse)

| Round | Team 1/Winner | Score | Team 2/Loser |
|---|---|---|---|
| 1 | (South Korea) Korea Republic (3) | 8-3 | Sweden (11) |
| 1 | Chinese Taipei (5) | 8-3 | United States (14) |
| 2 | (South Korea) Korea Republic (3) | 8-6 | Chinese Taipei (5) |
| 2 | Sweden (11) | 8-0 | United States (14) |
| 3 | (South Korea) Korea Republic (3) | 8-0 | United States (14) |
| 3 | Sweden (11) | 8-2 | Chinese Taipei (5) |

==== Group 4 ====
| Rank | Team | Pld | W | L | GF | GA | GD | Pts | Qualification |
|---|---|---|---|---|---|---|---|---|---|
| 1 | Germany (4) | 3 | 3 | 0 | 24 | 11 | +13 | 6 | Advance to Round-robin |
| 2 | France (6) | 3 | 2 | 1 | 20 | 14 | +6 | 5 | Advance to Round-robin |
| 3 | Romania (12) | 3 | 1 | 2 | 19 | 18 | +1 | 4 | |
| 4 | Brazil (13) | 3 | 0 | 3 | 4 | 24 | –20 | 3 | |

Round-robin Results (Click to expand/collapse)

| Round | Team 1/Winner | Score | Team 2/Loser |
|---|---|---|---|
| 1 | Germany (4) | 8-5 | Romania (12) |
| 1 | France (6) | 8-0 | Brazil (13) |
| 2 | Germany (4) | 8-4 | France (6) |
| 2 | Romania (12) | 8-2 | Brazil (13) |
| 3 | Germany (4) | 8-2 | Brazil (13) |
| 3 | France (6) | 8-6 | Romania (12) |

=== Second Stage: Round-robin ===
==== Round-robin Overall Results ====
| Rank | Team | Pld | W | L | GF | GA | GD | Pts | Qualification |
|---|---|---|---|---|---|---|---|---|---|
| 1 | China (1) | 7 | 7 | 0 | 56 | 16 | +40 | 14 | Advance to Knockout |
| 2 | Japan (2) (Note: Japan and Germany both have 12 points. Japan ranked higher due to head to head points. (Japan 8:3 Germany)) | 7 | 5 | 2 | 52 | 25 | +27 | 12 | Advance to Knockout |
| 3 | Germany (4) | 7 | 5 | 2 | 47 | 38 | +9 | 12 | Advance to Knockout |
| 4 | (South Korea) Korea Republic (3) | 7 | 4 | 3 | 41 | 44 | -3 | 11 | Advance to Knockout |
| 5 | France (6) | 7 | 3 | 4 | 44 | 45 | -1 | 10 | |
| 6 | Croatia (16) (Note: Croatia and Hong Kong, China both have 9 points. Croatia ranked higher due to head to head points. (Croatia 8:6 Hong Kong, China)) | 7 | 2 | 5 | 27 | 47 | -20 | 9 | |
| 7 | Hong Kong, China (10) | 7 | 2 | 5 | 35 | 53 | -18 | 9 | |
| 8 | Sweden (11) | 7 | 0 | 7 | 22 | 56 | -34 | 7 | |

Round-robin Results (Click to expand/collapse)

| Round | Team 1/Winner | Score | Team 2/Loser |
|---|---|---|---|
| Group 1 | China (1) | 8-1 | Hong Kong, China (10) |
| Group 2 | Japan (2) | 8-2 | Croatia (16) |
| Group 3 | (South Korea) Korea Republic (3) | 8-3 | Sweden (11) |
| Group 4 | Germany (4) | 8-4 | France (6) |
| 1 | China (1) | 8-0 | Croatia (16) |
| 1 | (South Korea) Korea Republic (3) | 8-7 | France (6) |
| 1 | Germany (4) | 8-5 | Sweden (11) |
| 1 | Japan (2) | 8-2 | Hong Kong, China (10) |
| 2 | China (1) | 8-0 | (South Korea) Korea Republic (3) |
| 2 | France (6) | 8-3 | Croatia (16) |
| 2 | Hong Kong, China (10) | 8-6 | Sweden (11) |
| 2 | Japan (2) | 8-3 | Germany (4) |
| 3 | China (1) | 8-2 | France (6) |
| 3 | (South Korea) Korea Republic (3) | 8-5 | Hong Kong, China (10) |
| 3 | Germany (4) | 8-1 | Croatia (16) |
| 3 | Japan (2) | 8-0 | Sweden (11) |
| 4 | China (1) | 8-4 | Germany (4) |
| 4 | Japan (2) | 8-2 | (South Korea) Korea Republic (3) |
| 4 | Hong Kong, China (10) | 8-7 | France (6) |
| 4 | Croatia (16) | 8-1 | Sweden (11) |
| 5 | China (1) | 8-5 | Japan (2) |
| 5 | Germany (4) | 8-7 | (South Korea) Korea Republic (3) |
| 5 | France (6) | 8-3 | Sweden (11) |
| 5 | Croatia (16) | 8-6 | Hong Kong, China (10) |
| 6 | China (1) | 8-4 | Sweden (11) |
| 6 | France (6) | 8-7 | Japan (2) |
| 6 | (South Korea) Korea Republic (3) | 8-5 | Croatia (16) |
| 6 | Germany (4) | 8-5 | Hong Kong, China (10) |

=== Third Stage: Knockout ===
==== Knockout Bracket ====
Semifinals
1 | China (Second Stage 1st Place) | 3 | 2 | 2 | 1
3 | (South Korea) Korea Republic (Second Stage 4th Place) | 0 | 1 | 1 | 1
4 | Germany (Second Stage 3rd Place) | 0 | 1 | 2 | 0
2 | Japan (Second Stage 2nd Place) | 3 | 2 | 1 | 2

Final
1 | China (Second Stage 1st Place) (gold) | 3 | 3 | 2
2 | Japan (Second Stage 2nd Place) (silver) | 0 | 0 | 1
Bronze Medal Match
3 | (South Korea) Korea Republic (Second Stage 4th Place) | 1 | 2 | 2 | 1 | 1
4 | Germany (Second Stage 3rd Place) (bronze) | 2 | 1 | 1 | 2 | 2
