= 2007 Asian Junior and Cadet Table Tennis Championships =

Tournament details
- Dates: 25–30 July 2007
- Edition: 13th
- Location: Hoengseong, Korea

The 13th Asian Junior Table Tennis Championships 2007 were held in Hoengseong, Korea, from 25 to 30 July 2007. It was organised by Korea Table Tennis Association under the authority of the Asian Table Tennis Union (ATTU) and International Table Tennis Federation (ITTF).

== Medal summary ==
=== Events ===
Event	Gold	Silver	Bronze
Junior boys' singles	China; Li Yang	China; Cui Qinglei	China; Xu Ruifeng
Junior boys' singles	China; Li Yang	China; Cui Qinglei	Japan; Jun Mizutani
Junior girls' singles	China; Li Xiaodan	China; Cao Lisi	China; Wen Jia
Junior girls' singles	China; Li Xiaodan	China; Cao Lisi	Japan; Yuka Ishigaki
Junior boys' doubles	Japan; Jun Mizutani; Kenta Matsudaira	Chinese Taipei; Chiang Hung Chieh; Chen Chien An	China; Chen Hao; Xu Ruifeng
Junior boys' doubles	Japan; Jun Mizutani; Kenta Matsudaira	Chinese Taipei; Chiang Hung Chieh; Chen Chien An	Vietnam; Ly Tieu Lan; Nguyen Hoang Chung
Junior girls' doubles	China; Wen Jia; Yang Yang	China; Li Xiaodan; Cao Lisi	Japan; Kasumi Ishikawa; Yuko Fujii
Junior girls' doubles	China; Wen Jia; Yang Yang	China; Li Xiaodan; Cao Lisi	(South Korea) South Korea; Kim Min Hee; Lee So Bong
Junior boys' team	Japan	South Korea	China
Junior boys' team	Japan	South Korea	Chinese Taipei
Junior girls' team	China	Japan	Chinese Taipei
Junior girls' team	China	Japan	South Korea
Cadet boys' singles	China; Yan An	China; Song Hongyuan	Japan; Taiyo Nomura
Cadet boys' singles	China; Yan An	China; Song Hongyuan	(South Korea) South Korea; Lee Seung Jun
Cadet girls' singles	China; Chen Meng	China; Tian Minwei	India; Ankita Das
Cadet girls' singles	China; Chen Meng	China; Tian Minwei	(South Korea) South Korea; Yang Ha Eun
Cadet boys' team	China	South Korea	Japan
Cadet boys' team	China	South Korea	South Korea
Cadet girls' team	China	South Korea	South Korea
Cadet girls' team	China	South Korea	Thailand

=== Medal table ===
* Host nation (South Korea)

Rank	Nation	Gold	Silver	Bronze	Total
1	China	8	5	4	17
2	Japan	2	1	5	8
3	South Korea*	0	3	6	9
4	Chinese Taipei	0	1	2	3
5	India	0	0	1	1
5	Thailand	0	0	1	1
5	Vietnam	0	0	1	1
Totals (7 entries)		10	10	20	40

== See also ==
- 2007 World Junior Table Tennis Championships
- Asian Table Tennis Championships
- Asian Table Tennis Union
