= 2018 German Open (table tennis) =

2018 edition of table tennis tournament

Tournament details
- Dates: 22–25 March 2018
- Competitors: 32S / 16D
- Total prize money: US$235,000
- Venue: ÖVB Arena
- Location: Bremen, Germany

Champions
- Men's singles: (China) Ma Long
- Women's singles: (Japan) Kasumi Ishikawa
- Men's doubles: (China) Ma Long (China) Xu Xin
- Women's doubles: (Japan) Hina Hayata (Japan) Mima Ito

The 2018 German Open was the third event of the 2018 ITTF World Tour. It was the second of six top-tier Platinum events on the tour, and took place from 22–25 March in Bremen, Germany.

China's Ma Long won the men's singles title for a fifth time, making him the most successful player in the tournament's history.

== Men's singles ==
=== Seeds ===
1. (Germany) Dimitrij Ovtcharov (first round, retired)
2. (Germany) Timo Boll (quarterfinals)
3. (China) Xu Xin (final)
4. (Japan) Koki Niwa (second round)
5. (China) Ma Long (champion)
6. (Hong Kong) Wong Chun Ting (semifinals)
7. (France) Simon Gauzy (quarterfinals)
8. (Japan) Tomokazu Harimoto (first round)
9. (Portugal) Marcos Freitas (second round)
10. (Chinese Taipei) Chuang Chih-yuan (second round)
11. (Japan) Jun Mizutani (second round)
12. (South Korea) Lee Sang-su (second round)
13. (Brazil) Hugo Calderano (first round)
14. (Egypt) Omar Assar (first round)
15. (Japan) Yuya Oshima (first round)
16. (Sweden) Kristian Karlsson (quarterfinals)

=== Draw ===
==== Top half ====
First round
1	(Germany) Dimitrij Ovtcharov	6	11	10	1	ret
(Germany) Patrick Franziska	11	7	12	5
(Japan) Masaki Yoshida	11	4	11	11	5	9	9
9	(Portugal) Marcos Freitas	9	11	8	9	11	11	11
16	(Sweden) Kristian Karlsson	5	12	11	9	11	11
(Germany) Ricardo Walther	11	10	8	11	9	9
(Germany) Ruwen Filus	11	7	14	8	11	11
8	(Japan) Tomokazu Harimoto	5	11	12	11	7	5
7	(France) Simon Gauzy	11	4	4	11	11	5	11
(Croatia) Andrej Gaćina	3	11	11	9	7	11	5
(Hong Kong) Ho Kwan Kit	11	11	11	5	12
14	(Egypt) Omar Assar	6	7	6	11	10
15	(Japan) Yuya Oshima	10	11	6	11	8	8
(South Korea) Jung Young-sik	12	4	11	1	11	11
(Poland) Jakub Dyjas	5	11	8	6	11	5
3	(China) Xu Xin	11	9	11	11	9	11

Second round
(Germany) Patrick Franziska	11	9	7	15	13	11
9	(Portugal) Marcos Freitas	9	11	11	13	11	5
16	(Sweden) Kristian Karlsson	14	11	15	8	11
(Germany) Ruwen Filus	12	5	13	11	7
7	(France) Simon Gauzy	11	8	8	11	11	6	11
(Hong Kong) Ho Kwan Kit	7	11	11	9	9	11	5
(South Korea) Jung Young-sik	5	5	8	2
3	(China) Xu Xin	11	11	11	11

Quarterfinals
(Germany) Patrick Franziska	11	11	8	11	11
16	(Sweden) Kristian Karlsson	9	4	11	9	7
7	(France) Simon Gauzy	12	11	5	10	3	7
3	(China) Xu Xin	10	9	11	12	11	11

Semifinals
(Germany) Patrick Franziska	11	6	8	11	5	7
3	(China) Xu Xin	9	11	11	8	11	11

==== Bottom half ====
First round
4	(Japan) Koki Niwa	11	11	5	11	8	11
(Japan) Jin Ueda	8	6	11	5	11	6
(Sweden) Mattias Karlsson	13	9	11	10	11	12
13	(Brazil) Hugo Calderano	11	11	8	12	6	10
12	(South Korea) Lee Sang-su	12	11	7	13	11
(Russia) Kirill Skachkov	10	3	11	11	3
(South Korea) Jeong Sang-eun	5	11	4	5	11	5
6	(Hong Kong) Wong Chun Ting	11	8	11	11	9	11
5	(China) Ma Long	11	11	11	14
(Japan) Maharu Yoshimura	6	7	5	12
(Denmark) Jonathan Groth	3	7	8	7
11	(Japan) Jun Mizutani	11	11	11	11
10	(Chinese Taipei) Chuang Chih-yuan	4	11	11	11	11
(Chinese Taipei) Liao Cheng-ting	11	9	6	7	8
(South Korea) An Jae-hyun	3	5	7	9
2	(Germany) Timo Boll	11	11	11	11

Second round
4	(Japan) Koki Niwa	8	11	3	8	9
(Sweden) Mattias Karlsson	11	8	11	11	11
12	(South Korea) Lee Sang-su	7	12	4	1	8
6	(Hong Kong) Wong Chun Ting	11	10	11	11	11
5	(China) Ma Long	11	11	11	11
11	(Japan) Jun Mizutani	6	7	9	9
10	(Chinese Taipei) Chuang Chih-yuan	3	11	13	6	11	11	7
2	(Germany) Timo Boll	11	9	11	11	9	13	11

Quarterfinals
(Sweden) Mattias Karlsson	10	11	8	11	9
6	(Hong Kong) Wong Chun Ting	12	13	11	5	11
5	(China) Ma Long	11	11	8	11	17
2	(Germany) Timo Boll	7	7	11	9	15

Semifinals
6	(Hong Kong) Wong Chun Ting	4	11	2	11	11	9
5	(China) Ma Long	11	13	11	9	4	11

==== Finals ====
Semifinals								Final
	(Germany) Patrick Franziska	11	6	8	11	5	7
3	(China) Xu Xin	9	11	11	8	11	11	3	(China) Xu Xin	9	11	9	9	6
6	(Hong Kong) Wong Chun Ting	4	11	2	11	11	9	5	(China) Ma Long	11	9	11	11	11
5	(China) Ma Long	11	13	11	9	4	11

== Women's singles ==
=== Seeds ===
1. (Singapore) Feng Tianwei (semifinals)
2. (Japan) Kasumi Ishikawa (champion)
3. (Japan) Mima Ito (second round)
4. (Japan) Miu Hirano (second round)
5. (Chinese Taipei) Cheng I-ching (semifinals)
6. (Hong Kong) Doo Hoi Kem (first round)
7. (Netherlands) Li Jie (first round)
8. (Chinese Taipei) Chen Szu-yu (first round)
9. (China) Chen Xingtong (second round)
10. (Hong Kong) Lee Ho Ching (first round)
11. (Japan) Hina Hayata (first round)
12. (Japan) Miyu Kato (first round)
13. (Japan) Sakura Mori (first round)
14. (South Korea) Seo Hyo-won (final)
15. (Germany) Han Ying (second round)
16. (Germany) Sabine Winter (first round)

=== Draw ===
==== Top half ====
First round
1	(Singapore) Feng Tianwei	11	11	8	11	10	11
(Japan) Satsuki Odo	9	9	11	7	12	4
(China) Huang Yingqi	11	13	3	11	9	8	11
12	(Japan) Miyu Kato	8	11	11	7	11	11	8
16	(Germany) Sabine Winter	11	9	6	13	9	5
(South Korea) Jeon Ji-hee	5	11	11	11	11	11
(Austria) Sofia Polcanova	12	11	17	11
7	(Netherlands) Li Jie	10	2	15	3
8	(Chinese Taipei) Chen Szu-yu	14	9	11	11	10	11	6
(South Korea) Yang Ha-eun	16	11	7	8	12	9	11
(Canada) Zhang Mo	6	7	14	9
15	(Germany) Han Ying	11	11	16	11
14	(South Korea) Seo Hyo-won	8	14	6	11	11	10	11
(Chinese Taipei) Cheng Hsien-tzu	11	12	11	9	6	12	7
(Japan) Honoka Hashimoto	6	9	9	11	14
4	(Japan) Miu Hirano	11	11	11	9	16

Second round
1	(Singapore) Feng Tianwei	8	11	4	9	11	11	11
(China) Huang Yingqi	11	3	11	11	5	9	6
(South Korea) Jeon Ji-hee	10	12	11	11	11	9	11
(Austria) Sofia Polcanova	12	14	8	5	8	11	9
(South Korea) Yang Ha-eun	11	12	11	14
15	(Germany) Han Ying	3	10	9	12
14	(South Korea) Seo Hyo-won	11	11	11	7	4	11
4	(Japan) Miu Hirano	8	9	6	11	11	7

Quarterfinals
1	(Singapore) Feng Tianwei	12	11	11	11
(South Korea) Jeon Ji-hee	10	9	3	4
(South Korea) Yang Ha-eun	6	10	11	10	11	11	7
14	(South Korea) Seo Hyo-won	11	12	3	12	4	4	11

Semifinals
1	(Singapore) Feng Tianwei	11	4	6	8	11	5
14	(South Korea) Seo Hyo-won	3	11	11	11	8	11

==== Bottom half ====
First round
3	(Japan) Mima Ito	11	11	9	12	11
(Netherlands) Britt Eerland	8	7	11	10	8
(China) Sun Yingsha	11	11	11	11
10	(Hong Kong) Lee Ho Ching	8	7	8	7
11	(Japan) Hina Hayata	9	4	9	6
(China) Wen Jia	11	11	11	11
(Japan) Saki Shibata	3	11	11	7	9
5	(Chinese Taipei) Cheng I-ching	11	3	13	11	11
6	(Hong Kong) Doo Hoi Kem	7	11	6	8	9
(China) Fan Siqi	11	8	11	11	11
(China) Wu Yang	11	11	13	11	9	12
13	(Japan) Sakura Mori	9	8	15	5	11	10
9	(China) Chen Xingtong	11	11	11	11
(China) Mu Zi	5	6	8	8
(Japan) Hitomi Sato	5	6	6	7
2	(Japan) Kasumi Ishikawa	11	11	11	11

Second round
3	(Japan) Mima Ito	11	9	12	6	11	12	6
(China) Sun Yingsha	7	11	14	11	6	10	11
(China) Wen Jia	8	12	7	8
5	(Chinese Taipei) Cheng I-ching	11	14	11	11
(China) Fan Siqi	4	7	7	2
(China) Wu Yang	11	11	11	11
9	(China) Chen Xingtong	9	8	18	6
2	(Japan) Kasumi Ishikawa	11	11	20	11

Quarterfinals
(China) Sun Yingsha	11	10	8	11	9	8
5	(Chinese Taipei) Cheng I-ching	3	12	11	8	11	11
(China) Wu Yang	12	11	4	8	11	7
2	(Japan) Kasumi Ishikawa	14	7	11	11	5	11

Semifinals
5	(Chinese Taipei) Cheng I-ching	5	11	6	12	11	8	6
2	(Japan) Kasumi Ishikawa	11	9	11	10	9	11	11

==== Finals ====
Semifinals									Final
1	(Singapore) Feng Tianwei	11	4	6	8	11	5
14	(South Korea) Seo Hyo-won	3	11	11	11	8	11		14	(South Korea) Seo Hyo-won	9	12	6	7	6
5	(Chinese Taipei) Cheng I-ching	5	11	6	12	11	8	6	2	(Japan) Kasumi Ishikawa	11	10	11	11	11
2	(Japan) Kasumi Ishikawa	11	9	11	10	9	11	11

== Men's doubles ==
=== Seeds ===
1. (Hong Kong) Ho Kwan Kit / Wong Chun Ting (quarterfinals)
2. (Germany) Patrick Franziska / (Denmark) Jonathan Groth (quarterfinals)
3. (Japan) Tomokazu Harimoto / Masataka Morizono (semifinals)
4. (Sweden) Kristian Karlsson / Mattias Karlsson (first round)
5. (China) Ma Long / Xu Xin (champions)
6. (Germany) Ruwen Filus / Ricardo Walther (quarterfinals)
7. (South Korea) Jung Young-sik / Lee Sang-su (final)
8. (Japan) Jun Mizutani / Yuya Oshima (quarterfinals)

=== Draw ===
First round
1	(Hong Kong) Ho / Wong	8	11	11	13
(Brazil) Calderano / (France) Gauzy	11	6	5	11
(India) Amalraj / Shetty	5	5	10
7	(South Korea) Jung / Lee	11	11	12
8	(Japan) Mizutani / Oshima	11	12	11
(Hungary) Ecseki / Szudi	7	10	2
(South Korea) Jang / Lim	5	12	10
3	(Japan) Harimoto / Morizono	11	14	12
4	(Sweden) K. Karlsson / M. Karlsson	8	7	8
(Chinese Taipei) Chen / Chuang	11	11	11
(Ukraine) Kou / (Belgium) Nuytinck
6	(Germany) Filus / Walther	w/o
5	(China) Ma / Xu	7	7	12	11	11
(Chinese Taipei) Liao / Lin	11	11	10	3	7
(Romania) Pletea / Szőcs	6	8	9
2	(Germany) Franziska / (Denmark) Groth	11	11	11

Quarterfinals
1	(Hong Kong) Ho / Wong	7	7	11	8
7	(South Korea) Jung / Lee	11	11	8	11
8	(Japan) Mizutani / Oshima	13	5	9	11	3
3	(Japan) Harimoto / Morizono	11	11	11	9	11
(Chinese Taipei) Chen / Chuang	4	11	8	11	11
6	(Germany) Filus / Walther	11	9	11	4	8
5	(China) Ma / Xu	11	8	11	11
2	(Germany) Franziska / (Denmark) Groth	9	11	3	1

Semifinals
7	(South Korea) Jung / Lee	5	12	11	11
3	(Japan) Harimoto / Morizono	11	10	9	9
(Chinese Taipei) Chen / Chuang	6	4	3
5	(China) Ma / Xu	11	11	11

Final
7	(South Korea) Jung / Lee	7	8	9
5	(China) Ma / Xu	11	11	11

== Women's doubles ==
=== Seeds ===
1. (Japan) Hina Hayata / Mima Ito (champions)
2. (Hong Kong) Doo Hoi Kem / Lee Ho Ching (semifinals)
3. (South Korea) Jeon Ji-hee / Yang Ha-eun (final)
4. (Sweden) Matilda Ekholm / (Hungary) Georgina Póta (first round)
5. (Hong Kong) Ng Wing Nam / Soo Wai Yam Minnie (semifinals)
6. (India) Manika Batra / Mouma Das (first round)
7. (Slovakia) Barbora Balážová / (Czech Republic) Hana Matelová (first round)
8. (Germany) Petrissa Solja / Sabine Winter (first round)

=== Draw ===
First round
1	(Japan) Hayata / Ito	11	13	12
(Spain) Xiao / (Canada) Zhang	8	11	10
(Thailand) Paranang / Sawettabut	11	11	8	10	11
6	(India) Batra / Das	9	8	11	12	9
5	(Hong Kong) Ng / Soo	11	11	11
(Poland) Grzybowska-Franc / Partyka	7	7	9
(Romania) Diaconu / Szőcs	11	9	11	11
4	(Sweden) Ekholm / (Hungary) Póta	8	11	5	5
3	(South Korea) Jeon / Yang	12	11	7	11
(Thailand) Khetkhuan / Komwong	10	8	11	5
(Romania) Monteiro Dodean / Samara	11	10	11	9	11
7	(Slovakia) Balážová / (Czech Republic) Matelová	9	12	3	11	5
8	(Germany) Solja / Winter	5	7	5
(Chinese Taipei) Cheng / Liu	11	11	11
(Germany) Han / Mittelham	7	5	8
2	(Hong Kong) Doo / Lee	11	11	11

Quarterfinals
1	(Japan) Hayata / Ito	11	11	11
(Thailand) Paranang / Sawettabut	7	8	9
5	(Hong Kong) Ng / Soo	6	11	11	11
(Romania) Diaconu / Szőcs	11	7	9	4
3	(South Korea) Jeon / Yang	11	11	9	11
(Romania) Monteiro Dodean / Samara	6	7	11	8
(Chinese Taipei) Cheng / Liu	9	11	13	9
2	(Hong Kong) Doo / Lee	11	13	11	11

Semifinals
1	(Japan) Hayata / Ito	10	11	11	11
5	(Hong Kong) Ng / Soo	12	4	5	6
3	(South Korea) Jeon / Yang	11	11	5	8	11
2	(Hong Kong) Doo / Lee	4	7	11	11	6

Final
1	(Japan) Hayata / Ito	11	11	10	11
3	(South Korea) Jeon / Yang	3	5	12	6
