= 2009 Asian Junior and Cadet Table Tennis Championships =

Tournament details
- Dates: 22–26 July 2009
- Edition: 15th
- Venue: SMS Indoor Stadium
- Location: Jaipur, India

The 15th Asian Junior Table Tennis Championships 2009 were held in Jaipur, India, from 22 to 26 July 2009. It was organised by the Table Tennis Federation of India under the authority of the Asian Table Tennis Union (ATTU).

== Medal summary ==
=== Events ===
Event	Gold	Silver	Bronze
Junior boys' singles	(South Korea) South Korea; Kim Min-seok	China; Yan An	China; Liu Yi
Junior boys' singles	(South Korea) South Korea; Kim Min-seok	China; Yan An	Chinese Taipei; Chen Chien-an
Junior girls' singles	China; Cao Lisi	China; Xue Siyu	China; Che Xiaoxin
Junior girls' singles	China; Cao Lisi	China; Xue Siyu	China; Sheng Dandan
Junior boys' doubles	China; Yan An; Li Muqiao	(South Korea) South Korea; Kim Min-seok; Seo Junghwa	(South Korea) South Korea; Seo Hyun-deok; Jeoung Young-sik
Junior boys' doubles	China; Yan An; Li Muqiao	(South Korea) South Korea; Kim Min-seok; Seo Junghwa	Singapore; Pang Xue Jie; Lim Jie Yan
Junior girls' doubles	Japan; Misaki Morizono; Ayuka Tanioka	China; Che Xiaoxi; Xue Siyu	Hong Kong; Lee Ho Ching; Guan Mengyuan
Junior girls' doubles	Japan; Misaki Morizono; Ayuka Tanioka	China; Che Xiaoxi; Xue Siyu	Chinese Taipei; Chen Szu-Yu; Cheng I-Ching
Junior boys' team	China	South Korea	Chinese Taipei
Junior boys' team	China	South Korea	Japan
Junior girls' team	China	South Korea	Hong Kong
Junior girls' team	China	South Korea	North Korea
Cadet boys' singles	China; Yin Hang	Japan; Asuka Machi	Hong Kong; Chiu Chung Hei
Cadet boys' singles	China; Yin Hang	Japan; Asuka Machi	(South Korea) South Korea; Kim Donghyun
Cadet girls' singles	(South Korea) South Korea; Yang Ha-eun	Japan; Miyu Maeda	Singapore; Isabelle Siyun Li
Cadet girls' singles	(South Korea) South Korea; Yang Ha-eun	Japan; Miyu Maeda	Thailand; Suthasini Sawettabut
Cadet boys' team	China	South Korea	Chinese Taipei
Cadet boys' team	China	South Korea	Japan
Cadet girls' team	China	Japan	Chinese Taipei
Cadet girls' team	China	Japan	South Korea

=== Medal table ===
Rank	Nation	Gold	Silver	Bronze	Total
1	China	7	3	3	13
2	South Korea	2	4	3	9
3	Japan	1	3	2	6
4	Chinese Taipei	0	0	5	5
5	Hong Kong	0	0	3	3
6	Singapore	0	0	2	2
7	North Korea	0	0	1	1
7	Thailand	0	0	1	1
Totals (8 entries)		10	10	20	40

== See also ==
- 2009 World Junior Table Tennis Championships
- Asian Table Tennis Championships
- Asian Table Tennis Union
