= 2006 Asian Junior and Cadet Table Tennis Championships =

Tournament details
- Dates: 25–30 July 2006
- Edition: 12th
- Location: Kitakyushu, Japan

The 12th Asian Junior Table Tennis Championships 2006 were held in Kitakyushu, Japan, from 25 to 30 July 2006. It was organised by Japan Table Tennis Association under the authority of the Asian Table Tennis Union (ATTU) and International Table Tennis Federation (ITTF).

== Medal summary ==
=== Events ===
Event	Gold	Silver	Bronze
Junior boys' singles	China; Li Yang	Japan; Taku Takaiwa	China; Xu Xin
Junior boys' singles	China; Li Yang	Japan; Taku Takaiwa	Japan; Jun Mizutani
Junior girls' singles	China; Yao Yan	China; Wen Jia	China; Li Xiaodan
Junior girls' singles	China; Yao Yan	China; Wen Jia	China; Mu Zi
Junior boys' team	South Korea	China	Chinese Taipei
Junior boys' team	South Korea	China	Japan
Junior girls' team	China	Japan	India
Junior girls' team	China	Japan	South Korea
Cadet boys' singles	Japan; Kenta Matsudaira	China; Song Shichao	Hong Kong; Li Chung Him
Cadet boys' singles	Japan; Kenta Matsudaira	China; Song Shichao	(South Korea) South Korea; Jeoung Young-sik
Cadet girls' singles	China; Shen Yanwen	China; Zhang Congcong	Hong Kong; Lee Ho Ching
Cadet girls' singles	China; Shen Yanwen	China; Zhang Congcong	Thailand; Suthasini Sawettabut
Cadet boys' team	China	Japan	Chinese Taipei
Cadet boys' team	China	Japan	South Korea
Cadet girls' team	China	Chinese Taipei	Japan
Cadet girls' team	China	Chinese Taipei	South Korea

=== Medal table ===
* Host nation (Japan)

Rank	Nation	Gold	Silver	Bronze	Total
1	China	6	4	3	13
2	Japan*	1	3	3	7
3	South Korea	1	0	4	5
4	Chinese Taipei	0	1	2	3
5	Hong Kong	0	0	2	2
6	India	0	0	1	1
6	Thailand	0	0	1	1
Totals (7 entries)		8	8	16	32

== See also ==
- 2006 World Junior Table Tennis Championships
- Asian Table Tennis Championships
- Asian Table Tennis Union
