= 2008 Asian Junior and Cadet Table Tennis Championships =

Tournament details
- Dates: 23–27 July 2008
- Edition: 14th
- Location: Singapore

The 14th Asian Junior Table Tennis Championships 2008 were held in Singapore, from 23 to 27 July 2008. It was organised by the Singapore Table Tennis Association under the authority of the Asian Table Tennis Union (ATTU) and International Table Tennis Federation (ITTF).

== Medal summary ==
=== Events ===
Event	Gold	Silver	Bronze
Junior boys' singles	(South Korea) South Korea; Lee Sang Soo	China; Song Hongyuan	China; Yan An
Junior boys' singles	(South Korea) South Korea; Lee Sang Soo	China; Song Hongyuan	(South Korea) South Korea; Seo Hyun Duk
Junior girls' singles	China; Li Xiaodan	China; Cao Lisi	China; Wu Yang
Junior girls' singles	China; Li Xiaodan	China; Cao Lisi	Chinese Taipei; Cheng I-Ching
Junior boys' doubles	China; Yan An; Song Hongyuan	China; Fang Bo; Cheng Jingqi	Chinese Taipei; Lee Chia-Sheng; Yeh Chih-Wei
Junior boys' doubles	China; Yan An; Song Hongyuan	China; Fang Bo; Cheng Jingqi	Japan; Kohei Morimoto; Kaito Fujimoto
Junior girls' doubles	China; Li Xiaodan; Wang Daqin	China; Wu Yang; Cao Lisi	Japan; Ayuka Tanioka; Misaki Morizono
Junior girls' doubles	China; Li Xiaodan; Wang Daqin	China; Wu Yang; Cao Lisi	Japan; Yuko Fujii; Megumi Okazaki
Junior boys' team	China	South Korea	Chinese Taipei
Junior boys' team	China	South Korea	Japan
Junior girls' team	China	Hong Kong	Japan
Junior girls' team	China	Hong Kong	South Korea
Cadet boys' singles	China; Zhang Shenwunan	China; Miao Xiangyang	(South Korea) South Korea; Shin In Chol
Cadet boys' singles	China; Zhang Shenwunan	China; Miao Xiangyang	(South Korea) South Korea; Kim Donghyun
Cadet girls' singles	China; Chen Meng	(South Korea) South Korea; Yang Ha-eun	Japan; Ayuka Tanioka
Cadet girls' singles	China; Chen Meng	(South Korea) South Korea; Yang Ha-eun	Japan; Yui Sato
Cadet boys' team	China	South Korea	Chinese Taipei
Cadet boys' team	China	South Korea	Japan
Cadet girls' team	China	Chinese Taipei	Japan
Cadet girls' team	China	Chinese Taipei	South Korea

=== Medal table ===
Rank	Nation	Gold	Silver	Bronze	Total
1	China	9	5	2	16
2	South Korea	1	3	5	9
3	Chinese Taipei	0	1	4	5
4	Hong Kong	0	1	0	1
5	Japan	0	0	9	9
Totals (5 entries)		10	10	20	40

== See also ==
- 2008 World Junior Table Tennis Championships
- Asian Table Tennis Championships
- Asian Table Tennis Union
