= Table tennis at the 2018 Asian Games – Mixed doubles =

Mixed doubles at the 2018 Asian Games
- Venue: Jakarta International Expo
- Date: 29–30 August 2018
- Competitors: 74 from 20 nations

Medalists
gold medal	Wang Chuqin; Sun Yingsha	China
silver medal	Lin Gaoyuan; Wang Manyu	China
bronze medal	Ho Kwan Kit; Lee Ho Ching	Hong Kong
bronze medal	Sharath Kamal; Manika Batra	India

The mixed doubles table tennis event at the 2018 Asian Games took place from 29 to 30 August 2018 at the Jakarta International Expo. Seeds were based on the individual ITTF World Ranking lists published in August 2018 with a maximum of 2 pairs per country.

== Schedule ==
All times are Western Indonesia Time (UTC+07:00)

Date	Time	Event
Wednesday, 29 August 2018	10:00	Round of 64
Wednesday, 29 August 2018	11:00	Round of 32
Wednesday, 29 August 2018	14:00	Round of 16
Wednesday, 29 August 2018	15:30	Quarterfinals
Wednesday, 29 August 2018	17:00	Semifinals
Thursday, 30 August 2018	19:00	Final

== Results ==
Legend

- r — Retired
- WO — Won by walkover

=== Finals ===
Quarterfinals
1	Lin Gaoyuan (CHN); Wang Manyu (CHN)	11	11	11
6	Lim Jong-hoon (KOR); Yang Ha-eun (KOR)	6	6	8
7	Ho Kwan Kit (HKG); Lee Ho Ching (HKG)	11	11	11
4	Chen Chien-an (TPE); Cheng I-ching (TPE)	7	8	2
9	Sharath Kamal (IND); Manika Batra (IND)	4	12	6	11	11
15	An Ji-song (PRK); Cha Hyo-sim (PRK)	11	10	11	6	8
10	Wang Chuqin (CHN); Sun Yingsha (CHN)	11	11	11
11	Gao Ning (SGP); Yu Mengyu (SGP)	9	6	4

Semifinals
1	Lin Gaoyuan (CHN); Wang Manyu (CHN)	11	11	11	11
7	Ho Kwan Kit (HKG); Lee Ho Ching (HKG)	7	7	3	3
9	Sharath Kamal (IND); Manika Batra (IND)	9	5	13	4	8
10	Wang Chuqin (CHN); Sun Yingsha (CHN)	11	11	11	11	11

Final
1	Lin Gaoyuan (CHN); Wang Manyu (CHN)	14	11	12	11	7	7
10	Wang Chuqin (CHN); Sun Yingsha (CHN)	12	9	14	13	11	11

=== Top half ===
==== Section 1 ====
Round of 64					Round of 32						Round of 16
					1	Lin Gaoyuan (CHN); Wang Manyu (CHN)	11	11	11	11
	Santoo Shrestha (NEP); Nabita Shrestha (NEP)	13	11	11		Santoo Shrestha (NEP); Nabita Shrestha (NEP)	6	1	13	7
32	Myandalyn Temüülen (MGL); Mönkhbatyn Undram (MGL)	11	7	9							1	Lin Gaoyuan (CHN); Wang Manyu (CHN)	11	11	11
											14	Pak Sin-hyok (PRK); Kim Nam-hae (PRK)	5	7	7
					24	Lê Đình Đức (VIE); Nguyễn Thị Nga (VIE)	7	5	4
					14	Pak Sin-hyok (PRK); Kim Nam-hae (PRK)	11	11	11

==== Section 2 ====
Round of 64	Round of 32						Round of 16
	13	Masataka Morizono (JPN); Misaki Morizono (JPN)	7	11	11	11
	18	Leong Chee Feng (MAS); Ho Ying (MAS)	11	4	8	6
							13	Masataka Morizono (JPN); Misaki Morizono (JPN)	11	5	11	6
							6	Lim Jong-hoon (KOR); Yang Ha-eun (KOR)	13	11	2	11
	31	Mohammed Abdulhussein (QAT); Aya Majdi (QAT)	8	6	6
	6	Lim Jong-hoon (KOR); Yang Ha-eun (KOR)	11	11	11

==== Section 3 ====
Round of 64					Round of 32						Round of 16
					7	Ho Kwan Kit (HKG); Lee Ho Ching (HKG)	11	11	11
	Sengarthid Vongdalasinh (LAO); Nitnapha Kongphet (LAO)	8	6	12	25	Mohamad Hamie (LBN); Malak Khoury (LBN)	6	1	6
25	Mohamad Hamie (LBN); Malak Khoury (LBN)	11	11	14							7	Ho Kwan Kit (HKG); Lee Ho Ching (HKG)	6	11	11	11
											16	Anthony Amalraj (IND); Madhurika Patkar (IND)	11	7	5	4
					19	Donny Prasetya Aji (INA); Lilis Indriani (INA)	4	13	8	9
					16	Anthony Amalraj (IND); Madhurika Patkar (IND)	11	11	11	11

==== Section 4 ====
Round of 64						Round of 32					Round of 16
						12	Padasak Tanviriyavechakul (THA); Suthasini Sawettabut (THA)	11	11	11
						23	Imesh Ranasinghe (SRI); Ishara Madurangi (SRI)	1	2	5
											12	Padasak Tanviriyavechakul (THA); Suthasini Sawettabut (THA)	7	11	5	14
28	Wang Chun (MAC); Cheong Cheng I (MAC)	11	7	11	11						4	Chen Chien-an (TPE); Cheng I-ching (TPE)	11	8	11	16
	Muhammad Asim Qureshi (PAK); Aisha Iqbal Ansari (PAK)	9	11	7	8	28	Wang Chun (MAC); Cheong Cheng I (MAC)	5	2	9
						4	Chen Chien-an (TPE); Cheng I-ching (TPE)	11	11	11

=== Bottom half ===
==== Section 5 ====
Round of 64					Round of 32					Round of 16
					3	Lee Sang-su (KOR); Jeon Ji-hee (KOR)	11	6
	Sonpasith Mosangsinh (LAO); Thiphakone Southammavong (LAO)	6	10	7	29	Bima Abdi Negara (INA); Rina Sintya (INA)	3	4^{r}
29	Bima Abdi Negara (INA); Rina Sintya (INA)	11	12	11						3	Lee Sang-su (KOR); Jeon Ji-hee (KOR)	7	11	8	12	4
										9	Sharath Kamal (IND); Manika Batra (IND)	11	7	11	10	11
					20	Choong Javen (MAS); Karen Lyne (MAS)	2	5	8
					9	Sharath Kamal (IND); Manika Batra (IND)	11	11	11

==== Section 6 ====
Round of 64	Round of 32					Round of 16
	15	An Ji-song (PRK); Cha Hyo-sim (PRK)	W	O
	22	Cheong Chi Chon (MAC); Chong Weng I (MAC)
						15	An Ji-song (PRK); Cha Hyo-sim (PRK)	11	11	12
						5	Chuang Chih-yuan (TPE); Chen Szu-yu (TPE)	5	7	10
	32	Jargalsaikhany Mönkhzorig (MGL); Batmönkhiin Bolor-Erdene (MGL)	1	3	5
	5	Chuang Chih-yuan (TPE); Chen Szu-yu (TPE)	11	11	11

==== Section 7 ====
Round of 64	Round of 32					Round of 16
	8	Jin Ueda (JPN); Miyu Maeda (JPN)	11	11	11
	26	Muhammad Rameez (PAK); Fatima Khan (PAK)	3	4	1
						8	Jin Ueda (JPN); Miyu Maeda (JPN)	7	6	9
						10	Wang Chuqin (CHN); Sun Yingsha (CHN)	11	11	11
	17	Supanut Wisutmaythangkoon (THA); Orawan Paranang (THA)	1	4	5
	10	Wang Chuqin (CHN); Sun Yingsha (CHN)	11	11	11

==== Section 8 ====
Round of 64							Round of 32						Round of 16
							11	Gao Ning (SGP); Yu Mengyu (SGP)	11	8	11	11
							21	Đinh Quang Linh (VIE); Mai Hoàng Mỹ Trang (VIE)	9	11	5	9
													11	Gao Ning (SGP); Yu Mengyu (SGP)	11	11	9	11
30	Abdulrahman Al-Naggar (QAT); Maha Faramarzi (QAT)	11	11	5	6	4							2	Wong Chun Ting (HKG); Doo Hoi Kem (HKG)	9	5	11	8
	Amar Lal Malla (NEP); Swechchha Nembang (NEP)	8	7	11	11	11		Amar Lal Malla (NEP); Swechchha Nembang (NEP)	4	3	1
							2	Wong Chun Ting (HKG); Doo Hoi Kem (HKG)	11	11	11
