= 2017 World Table Tennis Championships – Mixed doubles =

Mixed Doubles at the 2017 World Table Tennis Championships
- Venue: Messe Düsseldorf
- Location: Düsseldorf, Germany
- Dates: 29 May – 3 June
- Final score: 8–11, 8–11, 11–8, 10–12, 11–4, 11–9, 11–5

Medalists
Maharu Yoshimura; Kasumi Ishikawa	Japan
Chen Chien-an; Cheng I-ching	Chinese Taipei
Fang Bo; Petrissa Solja	China; Germany
Wong Chun Ting; Doo Hoi Kem	Hong Kong

The 2017 World Table Tennis Championships mixed doubles was the 54th edition of the mixed doubles championship.

Xu Xin and Yang Ha-eun were the defending champions but Xu did not compete this year.

Maharu Yoshimura and Kasumi Ishikawa won the title after defeating Chen Chien-an and Cheng I-ching 8–11, 8–11, 11–8, 10–12, 11–4, 11–9, 11–5.

== Seeds ==
Matches were best of 5 games in qualification and best of 7 games in the 64-player sized main draw.

1. (South Korea) Lee Sang-su / (South Korea) Yang Ha-eun (quarterfinals)
2. (Hong Kong) Wong Chun Ting / (Hong Kong) Doo Hoi Kem (semifinals)
3. (Sweden) Mattias Karlsson / (Sweden) Matilda Ekholm (quarterfinals)
4. (Hong Kong) Ho Kwan Kit/ (Hong Kong) Lee Ho Ching (second round)
5. (Chinese Taipei) Chen Chien-an / (Chinese Taipei) Cheng I-ching (final)
6. (Japan) Maharu Yoshimura / (Japan) Kasumi Ishikawa (champions)
7. (China) Fang Bo / (Germany) Petrissa Solja (semifinals)
8. (Poland) Jakub Dyjas / (Poland) Katarzyna Grzybowska (first round)
9. (Germany) Steffen Mengel / (Germany) Kristin Silbereisen (third round)
10. (Brazil) Vitor Ishiy/ (Brazil) Caroline Kumahara (second round)
11. (Chinese Taipei) Chuang Chih-yuan / (Chinese Taipei) Chen Szu-yu (third round)
12. (Egypt) Omar Assar / (Egypt) Dina Meshref (third round)
13. (Denmark) Jonathan Groth / (China) Feng Yalan (third round)
14. (South Korea) Jang Woo-jin / (South Korea) Lee Zi-on (third round)
15. (Argentina) Gaston Alto/ (Argentina) Ana Codina (second round)
16. (Russia) Grigory Vlasov / (Russia) Yana Noskova (third round)
17. (Singapore) Pang Xue Jie/ (Singapore) Yu Mengyu (second round)
18. (Czech Republic) Tomáš Konečný/ (Czech Republic) Hana Matelová (second round)
19. (Nigeria) Segun Toriola / (Nigeria) Olufunke Oshonaike (first round)
20. (Romania) Ovidiu Ionescu/ (Romania) Bernadette Szőcs (second round)
21. (North Korea) Pak Sin-hyok / (North Korea) Ri Hyon-sim (third round)
22. (Hungary) Krisztián Nagy / (Hungary) Szandra Pergel (third round)
23. (Egypt) Mohamed El-Beiali / (Egypt) Yousra Abdel Razek (first round)
24. (Puerto Rico) Brian Afanador / (Puerto Rico) Adriana Díaz (first round)
25. (India) Sathiyan Gnanasekaran/ (India) Manika Batra (second round)
26. (Germany) Benedikt Duda / (Germany) Sabine Winter (first round)
27. (Hungary) Nándor Ecseki/ (Hungary) Dóra Madarász (second round)
28. (Puerto Rico) Daniel González / (Puerto Rico) Melanie Díaz (first round)
29. (Serbia) Aleksandar Karakašević / (Lithuania) Rūta Paškauskienė (first round)
30. (Brazil) Eric Jouti / (Brazil) Lin Gui (first round)
31. (Thailand) Padasak Tanviriyavechakul/ (Thailand) Suthasini Sawettabut (second round)
32. (Luxembourg) Eric Glod / (Luxembourg) Sarah De Nutte (first round)

== Draw ==
=== Key ===
- Q = Qualifier
- w/o = Walkover
- w/d = Withdraw
- r = Retired
- DQ = Disqualified

=== Finals ===
Semifinals									Final
6	(Japan) Maharu Yoshimura (Japan) Kasumi Ishikawa	11	12	11	6	11	11	11
7	(China) Fang Bo (Germany) Petrissa Solja	13	14	5	11	5	7	5	6	(Japan) Maharu Yoshimura (Japan) Kasumi Ishikawa	8	8	11	10	11	11	11
5	(Chinese Taipei) Chen Chien-an (Chinese Taipei) Cheng I-ching	11	5	11	11	5	5	11	5	(Chinese Taipei) Chen Chien-an (Chinese Taipei) Cheng I-ching	11	11	8	12	4	9	5
2	(Hong Kong) Wong Chun Ting (Hong Kong) Doo Hoi Kem	7	11	5	6	11	11	9

=== Top half ===
==== Section 1 ====
First round
1	(South Korea) Lee S. (South Korea) Yang	11	11	11	11
(Argentina) Sanichi (Argentina) Molero	1	9	4	9
(Thailand) Passara (Thailand) Komwong	11	4	13	11	11
30	(Brazil) Jouti (Brazil) Lin	6	11	'11	8	6
22	(Hungary) Nagy (Hungary) Pergel	11	8	4	6	11	11	11
(Australia) Townsend (Australia) Tan	3	11	11	11	4	2	2
(Chile) Lamadrid (Chile) Vega	7	11	10	7	7
10	(Brazil) Ishiy (Brazil) Kumahara	11	5	12	11	11
15	(Argentina) Alto (Argentina) Codina	16	9	11	16	9	11
(Algeria) Kherouf (Algeria) Loghraibi	14	11	9	14	11	2
(Italy) Stoyanov (Italy) Vivarelli	10	4	6	4
21	(North Korea) Pak (North Korea) Ri	12	11	11	11
29	(Serbia) Karakašević (Lithuania) Paškauskienė	3	10	11	7	13	8
(Spain) Cantero (Spain) Xiao	11	12	9	11	11	11
(Belarus) Khanin (Belarus) Trigolos	8	4	5	1
6	(Japan) Yoshimura (Japan) Ishikawa	11	11	11	11

Second round
1	(South Korea) Lee S. (South Korea) Yang	11	11	11	11
(Thailand) Passara (Thailand) Komwong	4	6	6	6
22	(Hungary) Nagy (Hungary) Pergel	11	11	11	11
10	(Brazil) Ishiy (Brazil) Kumahara	6	8	1	5
15	(Argentina) Alto (Argentina) Codina	6	6	3	10
21	(North Korea) Pak (North Korea) Ri	11	11	11	12
(Spain) Cantero (Spain) Xiao	4	7	4	13	11	9
6	(Japan) Yoshimura (Japan) Ishikawa	11	11	11	11	8	11

Third round
1	(South Korea) Lee S. (South Korea) Yang	11	11	11	11
22	(Hungary) Nagy (Hungary) Pergel	2	8	4	5
21	(North Korea) Pak (North Korea) Ri	11	7	8	11	6
6	(Japan) Yoshimura (Japan) Ishikawa	4	11	11	13	11

Quarterfinals
1	(South Korea) Lee S. (South Korea) Yang	11	3	5	11	6
6	(Japan) Yoshimura (Japan) Ishikawa	13	11	11	8	11

==== Section 2 ====
First round
7	(China) Fang (Germany) Solja	9	11	9	11	5	11	11
(United States) Chodri (United States) Zhang	11	4	11	3	11	2	6
(Austria) Habesohn (Austria) Polcanova	11	11	9	9	13
20	(Romania) Ionescu (Romania) Szőcs	3	13	11	11	15
17	(Singapore) Pang (Singapore) Yu	11	11	11	11
(Malaysia) Leong (Malaysia) Ho	7	5	8	5
(Portugal) Carvalho (Portugal) Oliveira	5	5	2	1
11	(Chinese Taipei) Chuang (Chinese Taipei) Chen S.	11	11	11	11
16	(Russia) Vlasov (Russia) Noskova	10	11	11	11	11
(Nigeria) Aruna (Nigeria) Edem	12	5	5	6	8
(Slovakia) Pištej (Slovakia) Zhang	11	7	5	11	12	6	6
31	(Thailand) Tanviriyavechakul (Thailand) Sawettabut	5	11	11	8	10	11	11
26	(Germany) Duda (Germany) Winter	13	11	10	10	10	11	9
(Belgium) Nuytinck (Belgium) Lung	11	7	12	12	12	9	11
(Wales) O'Connell (Wales) Carey	9	6	4	6
3	(Sweden) Karlsson (Sweden) Ekholm	11	11	11	11

Second round
7	(China) Fang (Germany) Solja	11	11	11	11
20	(Romania) Ionescu (Romania) Szőcs	6	3	8	5
17	(Singapore) Pang (Singapore) Yu	6	11	14	4	11	11	9
11	(Chinese Taipei) Chuang (Chinese Taipei) Chen S.	11	5	16	11	8	7	11
16	(Russia) Vlasov (Russia) Noskova	14	9	13	9	11	11
31	(Thailand) Tanviriyavechakul (Thailand) Sawettabut	12	11	11	11	9	6
(Belgium) Nuytinck (Belgium) Lung	8	7	4	5
3	(Sweden) Karlsson (Sweden) Ekholm	11	11	11	11

Third round
7	(China) Fang (Germany) Solja	11	11	11	11
11	(Chinese Taipei) Chuang (Chinese Taipei) Chen S.	4	9	6	7
16	(Russia) Vlasov (Russia) Noskova	11	7	8	10	12	5
3	(Sweden) Karlsson (Sweden) Ekholm	5	11	11	12	10	11

Quarterfinals
7	(China) Fang (Germany) Solja	13	11	9	11	12
3	(Sweden) Karlsson (Sweden) Ekholm	11	5	11	8	10

=== Bottom half ===
==== Section 3 ====
First round
4	(Hong Kong) Ho (Hong Kong) Lee	11	11	11	11
(Belgium) Devos (Belgium) Degraef	1	8	4	5
(Spain) Robles (Spain) Dvorak	11	5	11	11	11
23	(Egypt) El-Beiali (Egypt) Abdel Razek	4	11	8	1	6
27	(Hungary) Ecseki (Hungary) Madarász	11	11	11	11
(Romania) Pletea (Romania) Diaconu	7	7	8	6
(Bulgaria) Kodjabashev (Bulgaria) Zamfirova	5	4	8	3
12	(Egypt) Assar (Egypt) Meshref	11	11	11	11
9	(Germany) Mengel (Germany) Silbereisen	11	11	11	9	11	11
(Chile) Gómez (Chile) Morales	7	2	13	11	8	4
(India) Desai (India) Patkar	11	11	11	14
28	(Puerto Rico) González (Puerto Rico) Díaz	7	8	6	12
19	(Nigeria) Toriola (Nigeria) Oshonaike	11	6	9	3	12	10
(Netherlands) Gommers (Netherlands) Vermaas	9	11	11	11	10	12
(Russia) Skachkov (Russia) Vorobeva	12	7	8	9	11	8
5	(Chinese Taipei) Chen C. (Chinese Taipei) Cheng	10	11	11	11	9	11

Second round
4	(Hong Kong) Ho (Hong Kong) Lee	11	11	8	9	11	9	10
(Spain) Robles (Spain) Dvorak	6	7	11	11	5	11	12
27	(Hungary) Ecseki (Hungary) Madarász	8	10	12	9
12	(Egypt) Assar (Egypt) Meshref	11	12	14	11
9	(Germany) Mengel (Germany) Silbereisen	8	8	11	11	12	11
(India) Desai (India) Patkar	11	11	9	7	10	9
(Netherlands) Gommers (Netherlands) Vermaas	9	7	5	9
5	(Chinese Taipei) Chen C. (Chinese Taipei) Cheng	11	11	11	11

Third round
(Spain) Robles (Spain) Dvorak	13	11	8	11	12
12	(Egypt) Assar (Egypt) Meshref	11	7	11	9	10
9	(Germany) Mengel (Germany) Silbereisen	11	11	8	8	4	6
5	(Chinese Taipei) Chen C. (Chinese Taipei) Cheng	8	8	11	11	11	11

Quarterfinals
(Spain) Robles (Spain) Dvorak	8	7	6	6
5	(Chinese Taipei) Chen C. (Chinese Taipei) Cheng	11	11	11	11

==== Section 4 ====
First round
8	(Poland) Dyjas (Poland) Grzybowska	4	4	5	7
(Japan) Tazoe (Japan) Maeda	11	11	11	11
(Turkey) Gündüz (Turkey) Yılmaz	4	8	14	6	5
18	(Czech Republic) Konečný (Czech Republic) Matelová	11	11	12	11	11
32	(Luxembourg) Glod (Luxembourg) De Nutte	3	9	11	5	10
(Finland) Oláh (Netherlands) Eerland	11	11	9	11	12
(France) Flore (France) Gasnier	11	6	7	11	9	11	7
14	(South Korea) Jang (South Korea) Lee Z.	8	11	11	9	11	6	11
13	(Denmark) Groth (China) Feng	11	11	11	11
(Vietnam) Đinh (Vietnam) Mai	5	9	4	2
(North Korea) Choe (North Korea) Ri	11	3	11	11	11
24	(Puerto Rico) Afanador (Puerto Rico) Díaz	4	11	2	7	8
25	(India) Gnanasekaran (India) Batra	11	8	11	11	11
(Luxembourg) Mladenovic (Luxembourg) Ni	6	11	2	8	8
(Slovenia) Jorgić (Slovenia) Galič	8	15	11	5	5	7
2	(Hong Kong) Wong (Hong Kong) Doo	11	13	9	11	11	11

Second round
(Japan) Tazoe (Japan) Maeda	11	9	10	12	11	11	11
18	(Czech Republic) Konečný (Czech Republic) Matelová	7	11	12	10	3	13	5
(Finland) Oláh (Netherlands) Eerland	11	11	2	11	9	6
14	(South Korea) Jang (South Korea) Lee Z.	1	4	11	13	11	11
13	(Denmark) Groth (China) Feng	11	11	8	10	12	8	11
(North Korea) Choe (North Korea) Ri	8	9	11	12	10	11	9
25	(India) Gnanasekaran (India) Batra	2	12	10	5	6
2	(Hong Kong) Wong (Hong Kong) Doo	11	10	12	11	11

Third round
(Japan) Tazoe (Japan) Maeda	11	11	8	11	11
14	(South Korea) Jang (South Korea) Lee Z.	7	7	11	5	4
13	(Denmark) Groth (China) Feng	8	8	11	11	11	9	8
2	(Hong Kong) Wong (Hong Kong) Doo	11	11	5	7	9	11	11

Quarterfinals
(Japan) Tazoe (Japan) Maeda	11	8	12	9	11	9
2	(Hong Kong) Wong (Hong Kong) Doo	8	11	14	11	7	11
