= 2013 Asian Junior and Cadet Table Tennis Championships =

Tournament details
- Dates: 30 August – 3 September 2013
- Edition: 19th
- Venue: Al-Gharafa Sports Club Hall
- Location: Doha, Qatar

The 19th Asian Junior and Cadet Table Tennis Championships 2013 were held in Doha, Qatar, from 30 August to 3 September 2013. It was organised by the Qatar Table Tennis Association under the authority of the Asian Table Tennis Union (ATTU).

== Medal summary ==
=== Events ===
Event	Gold	Silver	Bronze
Junior boys' singles	China; Liang Jingkun	South Korea; Kim Minhyeok	China; Yu Ziyang
Junior boys' singles	China; Liang Jingkun	South Korea; Kim Minhyeok	Japan; Masataka Morizono
Junior girls' singles	China; Chen Xingtong	Hong Kong; Doo Hoi Kem	Japan; Shiho Matsudaira
Junior girls' singles	China; Chen Xingtong	Hong Kong; Doo Hoi Kem	Singapore; Lin Ye
Junior boys' doubles	Chinese Taipei; Wen Wei-Chieh; Liao Cheng-Ting	South Korea; Kim Minhyeok; Jang Woojin	China; Liang Jingkun; Lyu Xiang
Junior boys' doubles	Chinese Taipei; Wen Wei-Chieh; Liao Cheng-Ting	South Korea; Kim Minhyeok; Jang Woojin	Japan; Asuka Sakai; Tonin Ryuzaki
Junior girls' doubles	Japan; Shiho Matsudaira; Miyu Maeda	Japan; Hitomi Sato; Miyu Kato	India; Reeth Rishya Tennison; Manika Batra
Junior girls' doubles	Japan; Shiho Matsudaira; Miyu Maeda	Japan; Hitomi Sato; Miyu Kato	Hong Kong; Doo Hoi Kem; Lam Yee Lok
Junior boys' team	China; Yu Ziyang; Liang Jingkun; Lyu Xiang; Zhang Bohan	South Korea; Jang Woojin; Kang Minho; Kim Minhyeok; Kim Minho	Chinese Taipei; Lee Chia-Sheng; Liao Cheng-Ting; Wen Wei-Chieh; Lin Hsueh-Yu
Junior boys' team	China; Yu Ziyang; Liang Jingkun; Lyu Xiang; Zhang Bohan	South Korea; Jang Woojin; Kang Minho; Kim Minhyeok; Kim Minho	Japan; Masataka Morizono; Asuka Sakai; Kohei Sambe; Tonin Ryuzaki
Junior girls' team	China; Chen Xingtong; Chen Ke; Zhang Rui	Japan; Shiho Matsudaira; Miyu Kato; Miyu Maeda; Hitomi Sato	Hong Kong; Doo Hoi Kem; Lam Yee Lok; Wong Chung Wan; Chan Mei Shan
Junior girls' team	China; Chen Xingtong; Chen Ke; Zhang Rui	Japan; Shiho Matsudaira; Miyu Kato; Miyu Maeda; Hitomi Sato	South Korea; Kim Byeolnim; Lee Zion; Ji Eunchae; Lee Seul
Cadet boys' singles	China; Liu Dingshuo	China; Wang Chuqin	China; Xue Fei
Cadet boys' singles	China; Liu Dingshuo	China; Wang Chuqin	South Korea; Hwang Minha
Cadet girls' singles	China; Li Yiran	China; Huang Fanzhen	Japan; Mima Ito
Cadet girls' singles	China; Li Yiran	China; Huang Fanzhen	Japan; Miu Hirano
Cadet boys' team	China; Liu Dingshuo; Wang Chuqin; Xue Fei	Chinese Taipei; Huang Chien-Tu; Yu Cheng-Feng; Lin Yun-Ju	Japan; Yuto Kizukuri; Takuto Izumo; Koyo Kanamitsu
Cadet boys' team	China; Liu Dingshuo; Wang Chuqin; Xue Fei	Chinese Taipei; Huang Chien-Tu; Yu Cheng-Feng; Lin Yun-Ju	South Korea; An Jaehyun; Hwang Minha; Kim Daewoo
Cadet girls' team	China; Huang Fanzhen; Fan Siqi; Li Yiran	Japan; Mima Ito; Miu Hirano; Yui Hamamoto	Hong Kong; Soo Wai Yam Minnie; Mak Tze Wing
Cadet girls' team	China; Huang Fanzhen; Fan Siqi; Li Yiran	Japan; Mima Ito; Miu Hirano; Yui Hamamoto	Thailand; Monapsorn Saritapirak; Promporn Mahawichian

=== Medal table ===
Rank	Nation	Gold	Silver	Bronze	Total
1	China	8	2	3	13
2	Japan	1	3	7	11
3	Chinese Taipei	1	1	1	3
4	South Korea	0	3	3	6
5	Hong Kong	0	1	3	4
6	India	0	0	1	1
6	Singapore	0	0	1	1
6	Thailand	0	0	1	1
Totals (8 entries)		10	10	20	40

== See also ==
- 2013 World Junior Table Tennis Championships
- Asian Table Tennis Championships
- Asian Table Tennis Union
