= 2004 Asian Junior and Cadet Table Tennis Championships =

Tournament details
- Dates: 19–24 July 2004
- Edition: 10th
- Location: New Delhi, India

The 10th Asian Junior Table Tennis Championships 2004 were held in New Delhi, India, from 19 to 24 July 2004. It was organised by the Table Tennis Federation of India under the authority of the Asian Table Tennis Union (ATTU) and International Table Tennis Federation (ITTF).

== Medal summary ==
=== Events ===
Event	Gold	Silver	Bronze
Junior boys' singles	China; Ma Long	China; Zhang Jike	Japan; Seiya Kishikawa
Junior boys' singles	China; Ma Long	China; Zhang Jike	(South Korea) South Korea; Cho Eon Rae
Junior girls' singles	China; Feng Yalan	China; Ding Ning	China; Liu Shiwen
Junior girls' singles	China; Feng Yalan	China; Ding Ning	(South Korea) South Korea; Choi Moon Young
Junior boys' doubles	China; Zhang Jike; Jiang Tianyi	China; Ma Long; Lin Chen	Chinese Taipei; Chou Tung Yu; Chuang Che-Wei
Junior boys' doubles	China; Zhang Jike; Jiang Tianyi	China; Ma Long; Lin Chen	Chinese Taipei; Wu Chih-Chi; Sun Wen Wei
Junior girls' doubles	China; Liu Shiwen; Cai Sai	South Korea; Jee Min Kyung; Park Seong Hye	Chinese Taipei; Lee I Chen; Shu Hui Tsun
Junior girls' doubles	China; Liu Shiwen; Cai Sai	South Korea; Jee Min Kyung; Park Seong Hye	(South Korea) South Korea; Seo Myeong Eun; Choi Moon Young
Junior mixed doubles	China; Ma Long; Cai Sai	China; Zhang Jike; Ding Ning	China; Tang Yushi; Hou Xiaoxu
Junior mixed doubles	China; Ma Long; Cai Sai	China; Zhang Jike; Ding Ning	Chinese Taipei; Wu Chih-Chih; Lee I Chen
Junior boys' team	China	South Korea	Chinese Taipei
Junior boys' team	China	South Korea	Japan
Junior girls' team	China	South Korea	Chinese Taipei
Junior girls' team	China	South Korea	Japan
Cadet boys' singles	India; Soumyajit Sarkar	(South Korea) South Korea; Kim Gang Woog	India; Sanil Shetty
Cadet boys' singles	India; Soumyajit Sarkar	(South Korea) South Korea; Kim Gang Woog	Hong Kong; Chan You Hang
Cadet girls' singles	Japan; Misako Wakamiya	(South Korea) South Korea; Jan Dal Rae	India; Divya Deshpande
Cadet girls' singles	Japan; Misako Wakamiya	(South Korea) South Korea; Jan Dal Rae	Sri Lanka; Ishara Madurangi

=== Medal table ===
* Host nation (India)

Rank	Nation	Gold	Silver	Bronze	Total
1	China	7	4	2	13
2	Japan	1	0	3	4
3	India*	1	0	2	3
4	South Korea	0	5	3	8
5	Chinese Taipei	0	0	6	6
6	Hong Kong	0	0	1	1
6	Sri Lanka	0	0	1	1
Totals (7 entries)		9	9	18	36

== See also ==
- 2004 World Junior Table Tennis Championships
- Asian Table Tennis Championships
- Asian Table Tennis Union
