= 2006 World Junior Table Tennis Championships =

Table tennis tournament in Egypt

Tournament details
- Dates: 10 – 17 December 2006
- Edition: 4th
- Venue: Cairo Stadium
- Location: Cairo, Egypt

The 2006 World Junior Table Tennis Championships were held in Cairo, Egypt from 10 to 17 December 2006. It was organised by the Egyptian Table Tennis Federation under the auspices and authority of the International Table Tennis Federation (ITTF). The fourth edition of the tournaments consisted of mixed doubles competitions and singles, doubles and team competitions for both boys and girls.

== Medal summary ==
Event	Gold	Silver	Bronze
Boys' singles	Japan; Kenta Matsudaira	China; Xu Ke	Germany; Dimitrij Ovtcharov
Boys' singles	Japan; Kenta Matsudaira	China; Xu Ke	Japan; Hidetoshi Oya
Girls' singles	China; Feng Yalan	China; Wen Jia	China; Mu Zi
Girls' singles	China; Feng Yalan	China; Wen Jia	China; Wu Yang
Boys' doubles	China; Jiang Haiyang; Wu Hao	China; Xu Ke; Xu Ruifeng	Japan; Kenji Matsudaira; Hidetoshi Oya
Boys' doubles	China; Jiang Haiyang; Wu Hao	China; Xu Ke; Xu Ruifeng	Portugal; Marcos Freitas; Andre Silva
Girls' doubles	China; Mu Zi; Wen Jia	China; Feng Yalan; Wu Yang	Germany; Amelie Solja; Rosalia Stahr
Girls' doubles	China; Mu Zi; Wen Jia	China; Feng Yalan; Wu Yang	Japan; Yuka Ishigaki; Moemi Terui
Mixed doubles	China; Xu Ke; Mu Zi	China; Jiang Haiyang; Wen Jia	China; Wu Hao; Feng Yalan
Mixed doubles	China; Xu Ke; Mu Zi	China; Jiang Haiyang; Wen Jia	Germany; Ruwen Filus; Amelie Solja
Boys' team	China; Xu Ke; Wu Hao; Jiang Haiyang; Xu Ruifeng	Japan; Kenta Matsudaira; Kenji Matsudaira; Taku Takakiwa; Hidetoshi Oya	Germany; Ruwen Filus; Dimitrij Ovtcharov; Steffen Mengel; Markus Schlichter
Boys' team	China; Xu Ke; Wu Hao; Jiang Haiyang; Xu Ruifeng	Japan; Kenta Matsudaira; Kenji Matsudaira; Taku Takakiwa; Hidetoshi Oya	Russia; Stanislav Golovanov; Mikhail Paykov; Artem Utochkin; Andrey Bukin
Girls' team	China; Feng Yalan; Mu Zi; Wen Jia; Wu yang	Japan; Yuka Ishigaki; Kasumi Ishikawa; Moemi Terui; Hiroe Udo	Hungary; Szandra Pergel; Li Bin; Timea Varga; Alexa Szvitacs
Girls' team	China; Feng Yalan; Mu Zi; Wen Jia; Wu yang	Japan; Yuka Ishigaki; Kasumi Ishikawa; Moemi Terui; Hiroe Udo	Romania; Elizabeta Samara; Daniela Dodean; Andreea Mamaliga; Irina Hoza

=== Medal table ===
Rank	Nation	Gold	Silver	Bronze	Total
1	China	6	5	3	14
2	Japan	1	2	3	6
3	Germany	0	0	4	4
4	Hungary	0	0	1	1
4	Portugal	0	0	1	1
4	Romania	0	0	1	1
4	Russia	0	0	1	1
Totals (7 entries)		7	7	14	28

== See also ==
- 2006 World Team Table Tennis Championships
