= 2012 Asian Junior and Cadet Table Tennis Championships =

Tournament details
- Dates: 11–16 July 2012
- Edition: 18th
- Venue: Jiangyin Gymnasium
- Location: Jiangyin, China

The Huangtu Grapes cup 2012 18th Asian Junior and Cadet Table Tennis Championships were held in Jiangyin, China, from 11 to 16 July 2012. It was organised by the Chinese Table Tennis Association under the authority of the Asian Table Tennis Union (ATTU).

== Medal summary ==
=== Events ===
| Event | Gold | Silver | Bronze |
|---|---|---|---|
| Junior boys' singles | China; Fan Zhendong | China; Fan Shengpeng | China; Liang Jingkun |
| Junior boys' singles | China; Fan Zhendong | China; Fan Shengpeng | China; Zheng Peifeng |
| Junior girls' singles | China; Chen Meng | China; Zhu Yuling | China; Li Jiayi |
| Junior girls' singles | China; Chen Meng | China; Zhu Yuling | China; Liu Gao Yang |
| Junior boys' doubles | China; Fan Shengpeng; Fan Zhendong | Japan; Masaki Yoshida; Asuka Machi | China; Zheng Peifeng; Zhou Qihao |
| Junior boys' doubles | China; Fan Shengpeng; Fan Zhendong | Japan; Masaki Yoshida; Asuka Machi | Chinese Taipei; Lee Chia-Sheng; Hung Tzu-Hsiang |
| Junior girls' doubles | China; Chen Meng; Zhu Yuling | China; Gu Ruochen; Li Jiayi | Hong Kong; Doo Hoi Kem; Li Ching Wan |
| Junior girls' doubles | China; Chen Meng; Zhu Yuling | China; Gu Ruochen; Li Jiayi | South Korea; Lee Da Som; Jung Yu Mi |
| Junior boys' team | China; Fan Zhendong; Fan Shengpeng; Zhou Qihao; Zheng Peifeng | Japan; Yuto Higashi; Yuto Muramatsu; Masaki Yoshida; Asuka Machi | Chinese Taipei; Lee Chia-Sheng; Hung Tzu-Hsiang; Liao Cheng-Ting; Sun Chia-Hung |
| Junior boys' team | China; Fan Zhendong; Fan Shengpeng; Zhou Qihao; Zheng Peifeng | Japan; Yuto Higashi; Yuto Muramatsu; Masaki Yoshida; Asuka Machi | South Korea; Jang Woojin; Cho Jaejun; Kim Donghyun; Kang Dongsoo |
| Junior girls' team | China; Zhu Yuling; Chen Meng; Gu Ruochen | South Korea; Lee Dasom; Jung Yumi; Ji Eunchae; Kang Haneul | Japan; Miyu Maeda; Ayuka Tanioka; Shiho Matsudaira; Rika Suzuki |
| Junior girls' team | China; Zhu Yuling; Chen Meng; Gu Ruochen | South Korea; Lee Dasom; Jung Yumi; Ji Eunchae; Kang Haneul | North Korea; Kim Mun Yong; Ri Hyon Sim; Jong Un Ju; Kim Su Hyang |
| Cadet boys' singles | China; Song Xu | China; Xue Fei | China; Liu Dingshuo |
| Cadet boys' singles | China; Song Xu | China; Xue Fei | China; Liu Yuheng |
| Cadet girls' singles | China; He Zhuojia | China; Wang Manyu | China; Chen Xingtong |
| Cadet girls' singles | China; He Zhuojia | China; Wang Manyu | China; Chen Ke |
| Cadet boys' team | China; Song Xu; Liu Dingshuo; Liu Yuheng | Japan; Kohei Sambe; Yuto Kizukuri; Tonin Ryuzaki | Chinese Taipei; Yu Cheng-Feng; Huang Chien-Tu; Yang Heng-Wei |
| Cadet boys' team | China; Song Xu; Liu Dingshuo; Liu Yuheng | Japan; Kohei Sambe; Yuto Kizukuri; Tonin Ryuzaki | Hong Kong; Hung Ka Tak; Tang Hoi Yen; Lee Yat Hin |
| Cadet girls' team | China; Chen Xingtong; He Zhuojia; Chen Ke | Japan; Yui Hamamoto; Mima Ito; Miu Hirano | Hong Kong; Soo Wai Yam Minnie; Wong Wing Tung |
| Cadet girls' team | China; Chen Xingtong; He Zhuojia; Chen Ke | Japan; Yui Hamamoto; Mima Ito; Miu Hirano | Thailand; Tamolwan Khetkhuan; Phacharaphon Manthiang |

=== Medal table ===
* Host nation (China)

| Rank | Nation | Gold | Silver | Bronze | Total |
|---|---|---|---|---|---|
| 1 | China* | 10 | 5 | 9 | 24 |
| 2 | Japan | 0 | 4 | 1 | 5 |
| 3 | South Korea | 0 | 1 | 2 | 3 |
| 4 | Chinese Taipei | 0 | 0 | 3 | 3 |
| 4 | Hong Kong | 0 | 0 | 3 | 3 |
| 6 | North Korea | 0 | 0 | 1 | 1 |
| 6 | Thailand | 0 | 0 | 1 | 1 |
| Totals (7 entries) | | 10 | 10 | 20 | 40 |

== See also ==
- 2012 World Junior Table Tennis Championships
- Asian Table Tennis Championships
- Asian Table Tennis Union
