= 1987 Asian Junior and Cadet Table Tennis Championships =

Tournament details
- Dates: 14–21 November 1987
- Edition: 3rd
- Location: Kediri, Indonesia

The 3rd Asian Junior Table Tennis Championships 1987 were held in Kediri, Indonesia, from 14 to 21 November 1987. It was organised by the Indonesian Table Tennis Association under the authority of the Asian Table Tennis Union (ATTU) and International Table Tennis Federation (ITTF).

== Medal summary ==
=== Events ===
Event	Gold	Silver	Bronze
Junior boys' singles	China; Liu Junhui	China; Lin Zhisang	China; Chen Hongyu
Junior boys' singles	China; Liu Junhui	China; Lin Zhisang	(South Korea) South Korea; Kim Taek Soo
Junior girls' singles	(South Korea) South Korea; Hons Cha Ok	China; Wang Xiuming	China; Zhang Qin
Junior girls' singles	(South Korea) South Korea; Hons Cha Ok	China; Wang Xiuming	North Korea; Li Mi Suk
Junior boys' doubles	(South Korea) South Korea; Lee Chong Mu; Kim Suk Man	Japan; Tomohiko Tokumura; Tsuyoshi Ogasawara	Chinese Taipei; Hsieh Wen Tang; Wang Chun Chuan
Junior boys' doubles	(South Korea) South Korea; Lee Chong Mu; Kim Suk Man	Japan; Tomohiko Tokumura; Tsuyoshi Ogasawara	(South Korea) South Korea; Kim Taek Soo; Kang Hee Chan
Junior girls' doubles	(South Korea) South Korea; Lee Jung Im; Jung Ji Young	Japan; Yukino Matsumoto; Rika Sato	China; Gao Dongping; Wang Xiuming
Junior girls' doubles	(South Korea) South Korea; Lee Jung Im; Jung Ji Young	Japan; Yukino Matsumoto; Rika Sato	(Japan); Noriko Oba; Shizuko Yoshida
Junior girls' mixed	(South Korea) South Korea; Lee Chong Mu; Lee Jung Im	(South Korea) South Korea; Kan Hee Chan; Kwon Mi Sook	North Korea; Li Sung Il; Kim Hye Yong
Junior girls' mixed	(South Korea) South Korea; Lee Chong Mu; Lee Jung Im	(South Korea) South Korea; Kan Hee Chan; Kwon Mi Sook	North Korea; Yun Mun Song; Yu Sun Bok
Junior boys' team	North Korea	South Korea	China
Junior girls' team	North Korea	China	South Korea
Cadet boys' singles	North Korea; Kim Myong Jun	(Japan) Japan; Takuya Tanaka	(Japan) Japan; Takeshi Fujimoto
Cadet boys' singles	North Korea; Kim Myong Jun	(Japan) Japan; Takuya Tanaka	(Japan) Japan; Masuda Hiroki
Cadet girls' singles	(Japan) Japan; Tomoko Ono	China; Sun Linan	(Japan) Japan; Masayo Kawai
Cadet girls' singles	(Japan) Japan; Tomoko Ono	China; Sun Linan	North Korea; Li Gwan Ok
Hopes boys' singles	(Japan) Japan; Kinjiro Nakamura	China; Feng Zhe	Indonesia; Hengky
Hopes boys' singles	(Japan) Japan; Kinjiro Nakamura	China; Feng Zhe	Indonesia; Suwandi
Hopes girls' singles	(Japan) Japan; Satoko Fukuda	(Japan) Japan; Emi Tominaga	Indonesia; Lina Prasetyo
Hopes girls' singles	(Japan) Japan; Satoko Fukuda	(Japan) Japan; Emi Tominaga	Indonesia; Inneke

=== Medal table ===
* Host nation (Indonesia)

Rank	Nation	Gold	Silver	Bronze	Total
1	South Korea	4	2	3	9
2	Japan	3	4	4	11
3	North Korea	3	0	4	7
4	China	1	5	4	10
5	Indonesia*	0	0	4	4
6	Chinese Taipei	0	0	1	1
Totals (6 entries)		11	11	20	42

== See also ==
- Asian Table Tennis Championships
- Asian Table Tennis Union
