= 2005 Asian Junior and Cadet Table Tennis Championships =

Tournament details
- Dates: 23–28 July 2005
- Edition: 11th
- Location: New Delhi, India

The 11th Asian Junior Table Tennis Championships 2005 were held in New Delhi, India, from 23 to 28 July 2005. It was organised by the Table Tennis Federation of India under the authority of the Asian Table Tennis Union (ATTU) and International Table Tennis Federation (ITTF).

== Medal summary ==
=== Events ===
Event	Gold	Silver	Bronze
Junior boys' singles	China; Lin Chen	China; Liu Miao	(South Korea) South Korea; Lee Jin Kwon
Junior boys' singles	China; Lin Chen	China; Liu Miao	(South Korea) South Korea; Lee Sang Soo
Junior girls' singles	China; Feng Yalan	China; Peng Xue	China; Yao Yan
Junior girls' singles	China; Feng Yalan	China; Peng Xue	China; Liu Chun
Junior boys' doubles	Chinese Taipei; Chiang Hung-chieh; Huang Sheng Sheng	China; Li Yang; Jiang Haiyang	(Chinese Taipei) Chou Tung Yu (Chinese Taipei)
Junior boys' doubles	Chinese Taipei; Chiang Hung-chieh; Huang Sheng Sheng	China; Li Yang; Jiang Haiyang	Japan; Seiya Kishikawa; Jun Mizutani
Junior girls' doubles	China; Feng Yalan; Liu Chun	China; Yao Yan; Peng Xue	Japan; Shiho Ono; Miwako Ishizuka
Junior girls' doubles	China; Feng Yalan; Liu Chun	China; Yao Yan; Peng Xue	(South Korea) South Korea; Shim Se Rom; Jin Dal Rae
Junior mixed doubles	Japan; Seiya Kishikawa; Moemi Terui	Japan; Jun Mizutani; Shiho Ono	Chinese Taipei; Chou Tung Yu; Lee I-Chen
Junior mixed doubles	Japan; Seiya Kishikawa; Moemi Terui	Japan; Jun Mizutani; Shiho Ono	China; Lin Chen; Feng Yalan
Junior boys' team	China	South Korea	Chinese Taipei
Junior boys' team	China	South Korea	Japan
Junior girls' team	China	South Korea	Chinese Taipei
Junior girls' team	China	South Korea	Japan
Cadet boys' singles	Japan; Kenta Matsudaira	(South Korea) South Korea; Jeoung Young-sik	India; Ghosh Soumyajit
Cadet boys' singles	Japan; Kenta Matsudaira	(South Korea) South Korea; Jeoung Young-sik	(South Korea) South Korea; Kim Min Seok
Cadet girls' singles	Singapore; Sim Kai Xin Zena	Hong Kong; Lee Ho Ching	India; Aggarwal Neha
Cadet girls' singles	Singapore; Sim Kai Xin Zena	Hong Kong; Lee Ho Ching	(South Korea) South Korea; Lee So Bang

=== Medal table ===
* Host nation (India)

Rank	Nation	Gold	Silver	Bronze	Total
1	China	5	4	3	12
2	Japan	2	1	4	7
3	Chinese Taipei	1	0	4	5
4	Singapore	1	0	0	1
5	South Korea	0	3	5	8
6	Hong Kong	0	1	0	1
7	India*	0	0	2	2
Totals (7 entries)		9	9	18	36

== See also ==
- 2005 World Junior Table Tennis Championships
- Asian Table Tennis Championships
- Asian Table Tennis Union
