= 2003 Asian Junior and Cadet Table Tennis Championships =

Tournament details
- Dates: 2–7 September 2003
- Edition: 9th
- Location: Hyderabad, India

The 9th Asian Junior Table Tennis Championships 2003 were held in Hyderabad, India, from 2 to 7 September 2003. It was organised by the Table Tennis Federation of India under the authority of the Asian Table Tennis Union (ATTU) and International Table Tennis Federation (ITTF).

== Medal summary ==
=== Events ===
Event	Gold	Silver	Bronze
Junior boys' singles	China; Zheng Changgong	(South Korea) South Korea; Kim Tae Hoon	China; Li Hu
Junior boys' singles	China; Zheng Changgong	(South Korea) South Korea; Kim Tae Hoon	(South Korea) South Korea; Lim Jae Hyun
Junior girls' singles	China; Li Qian	China; Peng Luyang	China; Li Xiaoxia
Junior girls' singles	China; Li Qian	China; Peng Luyang	China; Fan Ying
Junior boys' doubles	(South Korea) South Korea; Lim Jae Hyun; Jo Eon Rae	China; Zheng Changgong; Ma Long	China; Zhang Jike; Yang Xiaofu
Junior boys' doubles	(South Korea) South Korea; Lim Jae Hyun; Jo Eon Rae	China; Zheng Changgong; Ma Long	Japan; Minoru Muramori; Seiya Kishikawa
Junior girls' doubles	(South Korea) South Korea; Lee Eun Hee; Kim Jung Hyun	China; Cao Zhen; Peng Luyang	Japan; Midori Ito; Yuri Yamanashi
Junior girls' doubles	(South Korea) South Korea; Lee Eun Hee; Kim Jung Hyun	China; Cao Zhen; Peng Luyang	Japan; Ai Fukuhara; Sayaka Hirano
Junior mixed doubles	China; Yang Xiaofu; Peng Luyang	China; Ma Long; Fan Ying	China; Zheng Changgong; Li Xiaoxia
Junior mixed doubles	China; Yang Xiaofu; Peng Luyang	China; Ma Long; Fan Ying	China; Li Hu; Li Qian
Junior boys' team	Chinese Taipei	South Korea	China
Junior boys' team	Chinese Taipei	South Korea	Japan
Junior girls' team	China	South Korea	Chinese Taipei
Junior girls' team	China	South Korea	Japan
Cadet boys' singles	Japan; Jun Mizutani	Hong Kong; Li Kwun Ngai	(South Korea) South Korea; Kim Kang Wok
Cadet boys' singles	Japan; Jun Mizutani	Hong Kong; Li Kwun Ngai	United Arab Emirates; Omar Ra Hamid
Cadet girls' singles	(South Korea) South Korea; Nam Somi	Jordan; Zeina Shaban	India; Salankara Mahalanobish
Cadet girls' singles	(South Korea) South Korea; Nam Somi	Jordan; Zeina Shaban	Japan; Moemi Terui

=== Medal table ===
* Host nation (India)

Rank	Nation	Gold	Silver	Bronze	Total
1	China	4	4	7	15
2	South Korea	3	3	2	8
3	Japan	1	0	6	7
4	Chinese Taipei	1	0	1	2
5	Hong Kong	0	1	0	1
5	Jordan	0	1	0	1
7	India*	0	0	1	1
7	United Arab Emirates	0	0	1	1
Totals (8 entries)		9	9	18	36

== See also ==
- 2003 World Junior Table Tennis Championships
- Asian Table Tennis Championships
- Asian Table Tennis Union
