= 1986 Asian Junior and Cadet Table Tennis Championships =

Tournament details
- Dates: 1–6 April 1986
- Edition: 2nd
- Location: Nagoya, Japan

The 3rd Asian Junior Table Tennis Championships 1997 were held in Nagoya, Japan, from 1 to 6 April 1986. It was organised by the Japan Table Tennis Association under the authority of the Asian Table Tennis Union (ATTU) and International Table Tennis Federation (ITTF).

== Medal summary ==
=== Events ===
Event	Gold	Silver	Bronze
Junior boys' singles	North Korea; Kim Song Hui	China; Ma Wenge	China; Zhang Lei
Junior boys' singles	North Korea; Kim Song Hui	China; Ma Wenge	(South Korea) South Korea; Yoo Nam Kyu
Junior girls' singles	(South Korea) South Korea; Hyun Jung Hwa	(South Korea) South Korea; Hong Cha Ok	China; Gao Lijuan
Junior girls' singles	(South Korea) South Korea; Hyun Jung Hwa	(South Korea) South Korea; Hong Cha Ok	(South Korea) South Korea; Hong Soon Hwa
Junior boys' doubles	(South Korea) South Korea; Kim Taek Soo; Park Jae Hyun	North Korea; Yun Mun Song; Li Sung Il	(South Korea) South Korea; Kim Song Hui; Mun Ui Chol
Junior boys' doubles	(South Korea) South Korea; Kim Taek Soo; Park Jae Hyun	North Korea; Yun Mun Song; Li Sung Il	(South Korea) South Korea; Yoon Nam Kyu; Kim Kyung Ho
Junior girls' doubles	China; Chen Zihe; Gao Lijuan	(South Korea) South Korea; Hyun Jung Hwa; Hong Cha Ok	Chinese Taipei; Hsieh Shu Chuan; Huang Su Feng
Junior girls' doubles	China; Chen Zihe; Gao Lijuan	(South Korea) South Korea; Hyun Jung Hwa; Hong Cha Ok	Chinese Taipei; Lu Chiu Ju; Huang Chiu Hsiang
Junior mixed doubles	China; Yu Shendong; Liu Wei	(South Korea) South Korea; Kim Taek Soo; Hong Cha Ok	China; Fan Yiyong; Gao Lijuan
Junior mixed doubles	China; Yu Shendong; Liu Wei	(South Korea) South Korea; Kim Taek Soo; Hong Cha Ok	China; Ma Wenge; Chen Zihe
Junior boys' team	South Korea	North Korea	China
Junior girls' team	China	South Korea	North Korea
Cadet boys' singles	North Korea; Li Sung Il	China; Chen Hongyu	(Japan) Japan; Tomohiko Tokumura
Cadet boys' singles	North Korea; Li Sung Il	China; Chen Hongyu	North Korea; Ko Chun Ho
Cadet girls' singles	North Korea; An Hui Suk	Chinese Taipei; Wang Ming Yueh	China; Yin Yanping
Cadet girls' singles	North Korea; An Hui Suk	Chinese Taipei; Wang Ming Yueh	(Japan) Japan; Masayo Kawai

=== Medal table ===
* Host nation (Japan)

Rank	Nation	Gold	Silver	Bronze	Total
1	South Korea	3	4	4	11
2	China	3	2	6	11
3	North Korea	3	2	2	7
4	Chinese Taipei	0	1	2	3
5	Japan*	0	0	2	2
Totals (5 entries)		9	9	16	34

== See also ==
- Asian Table Tennis Championships
- Asian Table Tennis Union
