= 1997 Asian Junior and Cadet Table Tennis Championships =

Tournament details
- Dates: 1–6 September 1997
- Edition: 6th
- Location: Panaji Goa, India

The 6th Asian Junior Table Tennis Championships 1997 were held in Panaji, India, from 1 to 6 September 1997. It was organised by the Table Tennis Federation of India under the authority of the Asian Table Tennis Union (ATTU) and International Table Tennis Federation (ITTF).

== Medal summary ==
=== Events ===
| Event | Gold | Silver | Bronze |
|---|---|---|---|
| Junior boys' singles | China; Wang Jianjun | China; Tan Ruiwu | (South Korea) South Korea; Ryu Seung-min |
| Junior boys' singles | China; Wang Jianjun | China; Tan Ruiwu | (South Korea) South Korea; Joo Saehyuk |
| Junior girls' singles | China; Niu Jianfeng | China; Zhang Yining | (South Korea) South Korea; Lee Kanghyun |
| Junior girls' singles | China; Niu Jianfeng | China; Zhang Yining | (South Korea) South Korea; Park Mi-young |
| Junior boys' team | South Korea | China | Chinese Taipei |
| Junior girls' team | China | South Korea | Thailand |

=== Medal table ===
| Rank | Nation | Gold | Silver | Bronze | Total |
|---|---|---|---|---|---|
| 1 | China | 3 | 3 | 0 | 6 |
| 2 | South Korea | 1 | 1 | 4 | 6 |
| 3 | Chinese Taipei | 0 | 0 | 1 | 1 |
| 3 | Thailand | 0 | 0 | 1 | 1 |
| Totals (4 entries) | | 4 | 4 | 6 | 14 |

== See also ==
- Asian Table Tennis Championships
- Asian Table Tennis Union
