= 1989 Asian Junior and Cadet Table Tennis Championships =

Tournament details
- Dates: 20–26 December 1989
- Edition: 4th
- Location: New Delhi, India

The 4th Asian Junior Table Tennis Championships 1994 were held in New Delhi, India, from 20 to 26 December 1989. It was organised by the Table Tennis Federation of India under the authority of the Asian Table Tennis Union (ATTU) and International Table Tennis Federation (ITTF).

== Medal summary ==
=== Events ===
Event	Gold	Silver	Bronze
Junior boys' singles	North Korea; Choi Gyong Sop	North Korea; Kim Guk Chol	China; Feng Zhe
Junior boys' singles	North Korea; Choi Gyong Sop	North Korea; Kim Guk Chol	North Korea; Kim Jin Myong
Junior girls' singles	China; Wu Na	China; Fu Pei	North Korea; Chang Myong Sik
Junior girls' singles	China; Wu Na	China; Fu Pei	(South Korea) South Korea; Kim Bun Sik
Junior boys' doubles	(South Korea) South Korea; Hyun Jung Sik; Kim Hyung Woo	China; Liu Guoliang; Feng Zhe	North Korea; Kim Jin Myong; Choi Gyong Sop
Junior boys' doubles	(South Korea) South Korea; Hyun Jung Sik; Kim Hyung Woo	China; Liu Guoliang; Feng Zhe	North Korea; Kim Myong Jun; Kim Guk Chol
Junior girls' doubles	China; Fu Pei; Zheng Yuan	China; Wang Chen; Wu Na	North Korea; Son Soi Hwa; Kim Hyang Sim
Junior girls' doubles	China; Fu Pei; Zheng Yuan	China; Wang Chen; Wu Na	(South Korea) South Korea; Kwak Chae Suk; Park Ho Sun
Junior girls' mixed	(South Korea) South Korea; Hyun Jung Sik; Park Hae Jung	North Korea; Kim Myong Jun; Li Jong Suk	China; Dong Lun; Wang Chen
Junior girls' mixed	(South Korea) South Korea; Hyun Jung Sik; Park Hae Jung	North Korea; Kim Myong Jun; Li Jong Suk	North Korea; Kim Jin Myong; Chang Myong Sil
Junior boys' team	North Korea	South Korea	China
Junior girls' team	China	North Korea	South Korea
Cadet boys' singles	China; Kong Linghui	(Japan) Japan; Ryo Yuzawa	
Cadet girls' singles	India; Subramanian Bhuvaneswari	India; Ghosh	
Hopes boys' singles	India; Arup Basak	(Japan); K. Ikeda	
Hopes girls' singles	(Japan); Yuki Fujita	India; Bhola	

=== Medal table ===
* Host nation (India)

Rank	Nation	Gold	Silver	Bronze	Total
1	China	4	3	3	10
2	North Korea	2	3	6	11
3	India*	2	2	0	4
4	South Korea	2	1	3	6
5	Japan	1	2	0	3
Totals (5 entries)		11	11	12	34

== See also ==
- Asian Table Tennis Championships
- Asian Table Tennis Union
