= 1999 Asian Junior and Cadet Table Tennis Championships =

Tournament details
- Dates: 31 August – 5 September 1999
- Edition: 7th
- Location: Chennai, India

The 7th Asian Junior Table Tennis Championships 1999 were held in Chennai, India, from 31 August to 5 September 1999. It was organised by the Table Tennis Federation of India under the authority of the Asian Table Tennis Union (ATTU) and International Table Tennis Federation (ITTF).

== Medal summary ==
=== Events ===
| Event | Gold | Silver | Bronze |
|---|---|---|---|
| Junior boys' singles | (South Korea) South Korea; Ryu Seung Min | China; Wang Hao | China; Tang Peng |
| Junior boys' singles | (South Korea) South Korea; Ryu Seung Min | China; Wang Hao | China; Hao Shuai |
| Junior girls' singles | China; Zhang Fang | China; Li Qiangbing | China; Chen Qing |
| Junior girls' singles | China; Zhang Fang | China; Li Qiangbing | Chinese Taipei; Pan Li-Chun |
| Junior boys' doubles | (South Korea) South Korea; Ryu Seung Min; Kim Jung Hoon | China; Tang Peng; Wang Hao | China; Hao Shuai; Zhang Lizi |
| Junior boys' doubles | (South Korea) South Korea; Ryu Seung Min; Kim Jung Hoon | China; Tang Peng; Wang Hao | India; Subhajit Saha; Soumyadeep Roy |
| Junior girls' doubles | China; Chen Qing; Zhang Fang | Chinese Taipei; Lu Yun Feng; Pan Li Chun | India; Poulomi Ghatak; Mouma Das |
| Junior girls' doubles | China; Chen Qing; Zhang Fang | Chinese Taipei; Lu Yun Feng; Pan Li Chun | (South Korea) South Korea; Moon Hyun Jung; Kim Hyung Ha |
| Junior boys' team | China | South Korea | India |
| Junior boys' team | China | South Korea | Japan |
| Junior girls' team | China | Chinese Taipei | India |
| Junior girls' team | China | Chinese Taipei | South Korea |

=== Medal table ===
* Host nation (India)

| Rank | Nation | Gold | Silver | Bronze | Total |
|---|---|---|---|---|---|
| 1 | China | 4 | 3 | 4 | 11 |
| 2 | South Korea | 2 | 1 | 2 | 5 |
| 3 | Chinese Taipei | 0 | 2 | 1 | 3 |
| 4 | India* | 0 | 0 | 4 | 4 |
| 5 | Japan | 0 | 0 | 1 | 1 |
| Totals (5 entries) | | 6 | 6 | 12 | 24 |

== See also ==
- Asian Table Tennis Championships
- Asian Table Tennis Union
