= 2001 Asian Junior and Cadet Table Tennis Championships =

Tournament details
- Dates: 24–29 December 2001
- Edition: 8th
- Location: Hong Kong, Hong Kong

The 8th Asian Junior Table Tennis Championships 2001 were held in Hong Kong, Hong Kong, from 24 to 29 December 2001. It was organised by the Hong Kong Table Tennis Association Limited under the authority of the Asian Table Tennis Union (ATTU) and International Table Tennis Federation (ITTF).

== Medal summary ==
=== Events ===
Event	Gold	Silver	Bronze
Junior boys' singles	(South Korea) South Korea; Lee Jung Woo	China; Ling Weichao	China; Sun Ren
Junior boys' singles	(South Korea) South Korea; Lee Jung Woo	China; Ling Weichao	China; Yang Zi
Junior girls' singles	China; Peng Luyang	China; Guo Ye	China; Li Xiaoxia
Junior girls' singles	China; Peng Luyang	China; Guo Ye	China; Fan Ying
Junior boys' doubles	Japan; Kenichi Takakiwa; Yuki Mortia	China; Ling Weichao; Sun Ren	China; Yang Zi; Wang Zhen
Junior boys' doubles	Japan; Kenichi Takakiwa; Yuki Mortia	China; Ling Weichao; Sun Ren	Japan; Ryusuke Sakamoto; Seiya Kishikawa
Junior girls' doubles	China; Guo Yue; Li Xiaoxia	China; Peng Luyang; Fan Ying	Chinese Taipei; Yu Mei Ju; Su Hsien Chiu
Junior girls' doubles	China; Guo Yue; Li Xiaoxia	China; Peng Luyang; Fan Ying	(South Korea) South Korea; Kim Hye Hyun; Kim Su Jin
Junior boys' team	China	South Korea	India
Junior boys' team	China	South Korea	Japan
Junior girls' team	China	Chinese Taipei	Japan
Junior girls' team	China	Chinese Taipei	South Korea

=== Medal table ===
Rank	Nation	Gold	Silver	Bronze	Total
1	China	4	4	5	13
2	South Korea	1	1	2	4
3	Japan	1	0	3	4
4	Chinese Taipei	0	1	1	2
5	India	0	0	1	1
Totals (5 entries)		6	6	12	24

== See also ==
- 2001 World Junior Table Tennis Championships
- Asian Table Tennis Championships
- Asian Table Tennis Union
