= 1994 Asian Junior and Cadet Table Tennis Championships =

Tournament details
- Dates: 29 April – 3 May 1994
- Edition: 5th
- Location: Jōetsu, Niigata, Japan

The 5th Asian Junior Table Tennis Championships 1994 were held in Jōetsu, Niigata, Japan, from 29 April to 3 May 1994. It was organised by the Japan Table Tennis Association under the authority of the Asian Table Tennis Union (ATTU) and International Table Tennis Federation (ITTF).

== Medal summary ==
=== Events ===
Event	Gold	Silver	Bronze
Junior boys' singles	China; Wang Liqin	(South Korea) South Korea; Yang Hee Suk	China; Han Yang
Junior boys' singles	China; Wang Liqin	(South Korea) South Korea; Yang Hee Suk	Chinese Taipei; Yang Chao Ming
Junior girls' singles	China; Wang Nan	China; Yang Ying	(South Korea) South Korea; Kim Bok-rae
Junior girls' singles	China; Wang Nan	China; Yang Ying	(South Korea) South Korea; Kim Kyung-ah
Junior boys' team	North Korea	China	Chinese Taipei
Junior boys' team	North Korea	China	Japan
Junior girls' team	China	South Korea	Chinese Taipei
Junior girls' team	China	South Korea	Japan

=== Medal table ===
* Host nation (Japan)

Rank	Nation	Gold	Silver	Bronze	Total
1	China	3	2	1	6
2	North Korea	1	0	0	1
3	South Korea	0	2	2	4
4	Chinese Taipei	0	0	3	3
5	Japan*	0	0	2	2
Totals (5 entries)		4	4	8	16

== See also ==
- Asian Table Tennis Championships
- Asian Table Tennis Union
