= 2022 Asian Junior and Cadet Table Tennis Championships =

Badminton tournament in Vientiane, Laos

Tournament details
- Dates: 1–6 September 2022
- Edition: 26th
- Venue: ITEC Shopping Mall
- Location: Vientiane, Laos

The 2022 Asian Junior and Cadet Table Tennis Championships were held in Vientiane, Laos, from 1 to 6 September 2022. It was organised by the Laos Table Tennis Association under the authority of the Asian Table Tennis Union

== Medal summary ==
=== Events ===
Event	Gold	Silver	Bronze
Junior boys' singles	China; Chen Yuanyu	Chinese Taipei; Kao Cheng-Jui	China; Lang Guodong
Junior boys' singles	China; Chen Yuanyu	Chinese Taipei; Kao Cheng-Jui	China; Han Xinyuan
Junior girls' singles	China; Qin Yuxuan	China; Chen yi	China; Han feier
Junior girls' singles	China; Qin Yuxuan	China; Chen yi	India; Ghorpade Yashaswini
Junior boys' doubles	Japan; Sakai Yuhi; Iimura Yuta	China; Zeng Beixun; Liang Guodong	China; Chen Yuanxu; Han Xinyuan
Junior boys' doubles	Japan; Sakai Yuhi; Iimura Yuta	China; Zeng Beixun; Liang Guodong	India; Malik Yashansh; Jain Payas
Junior girls' doubles	Japan; Akae Kaho; Suzuki Misaki	Chinese Taipei; Huang Ching-Chia; Wang Hsiao-Hsin	China; Zong Geman; Han Feier
Junior girls' doubles	Japan; Akae Kaho; Suzuki Misaki	Chinese Taipei; Huang Ching-Chia; Wang Hsiao-Hsin	China; Chen Yi; Qin Yuxuan
Junior mixed doubles	India; Ghorpade Yashaswini; Jain Payas	China; Qin Yuxuan; Han Xinyuan	Hong Kong; Wong Hoi Tung; Chan Baldwin Ho Wah
Junior mixed doubles	India; Ghorpade Yashaswini; Jain Payas	China; Qin Yuxuan; Han Xinyuan	South Korea; Oh Junsung; Kim Seongjin
Junior boys' team	China; Liang Guodong; Han Xinyuan; Chen Yuanyu; Zeng Beixun	Japan; Takahashi Kotaro; Iimura Yuta; Sakai Yuhi; Maede Rikuto	India; Patil Deepit; Bhattacharjee Ankur; JAIN Payas; Malik Yashansh
Junior boys' team	China; Liang Guodong; Han Xinyuan; Chen Yuanyu; Zeng Beixun	Japan; Takahashi Kotaro; Iimura Yuta; Sakai Yuhi; Maede Rikuto	South Korea; Lee Hoyun; Park Changgeon; Oh Junsung; Lim Yunoh
Junior girls' team	China; Zong Geman; Qin Yuxuan; Han Feier; Chen Yi	Chinese Taipei; Huang Ching-Chia; Huang Yu-Jie; Wang Hsiao-Hsin; Tsai Yun-En	Japan; Shinohara Yura; Yumoto Fuwa; Suzuki Misaki; AKAE Kaho
Junior girls' team	China; Zong Geman; Qin Yuxuan; Han Feier; Chen Yi	Chinese Taipei; Huang Ching-Chia; Huang Yu-Jie; Wang Hsiao-Hsin; Tsai Yun-En	South Korea; Lee Yeonhui; KIM Seongjin; KIM Yejin; Lee Daeun
Cadet boys' singles	Japan; Tanimoto Takumi	Japan; Iwaida Shunto	Kazakhstan; Kurmangaliyev Alan
Cadet boys' singles	Japan; Tanimoto Takumi	Japan; Iwaida Shunto	China; Kang Youde
Cadet girls' singles	Thailand; Wonglakhon Phatsaraphon	Japan; Mende Rin	Japan; Lee Seungeun
Cadet girls' singles	Thailand; Wonglakhon Phatsaraphon	Japan; Mende Rin	China; Xu Yi
Cadet boys' team	China; Huang Youhao; Huang Xunan; Kang Youde	Chinese Taipei; Su Chen-Hsiang; Kuo Guan-Hong; Hung Jing-Kai	Iran; Faraji Benyamin; Habibi Mohammad; Karimi Samran
Cadet boys' team	China; Huang Youhao; Huang Xunan; Kang Youde	Chinese Taipei; Su Chen-Hsiang; Kuo Guan-Hong; Hung Jing-Kai	Japan; Iwaida Shunto; TanimotoTakumi; Kawakami Ryuusei
Cadet girls' team	Japan; Takamori Mao; Aoki Sachi; Mende Rin	Chinese Taipei; Tsai You-Jen; Lin Hsin-Tung; Wu Jia-En	South Korea; Yoo Yerin; Choi Yeseo; Lee Seungeun
Cadet girls' team	Japan; Takamori Mao; Aoki Sachi; Mende Rin	Chinese Taipei; Tsai You-Jen; Lin Hsin-Tung; Wu Jia-En	China; Xiang Junlin; Yan Yutong; Xu Huiyao

=== Medal table ===
Rank	Nation	Gold	Silver	Bronze	Total
1	China	5	3	9	17
2	Japan	4	3	3	10
3	India	1	0	3	4
4	Thailand	1	0	0	1
5	Chinese Taipei	0	5	0	5
6	South Korea	0	0	3	3
7	Hong Kong	0	0	1	1
7	Iran	0	0	1	1
7	Kazakhstan	0	0	1	1
Totals (9 entries)		11	11	21	43

== See also ==
- 2022 ITTF World Youth Championships
- Asian Table Tennis Union
