= Miyu Kato (table tennis) =

Japanese table tennis player

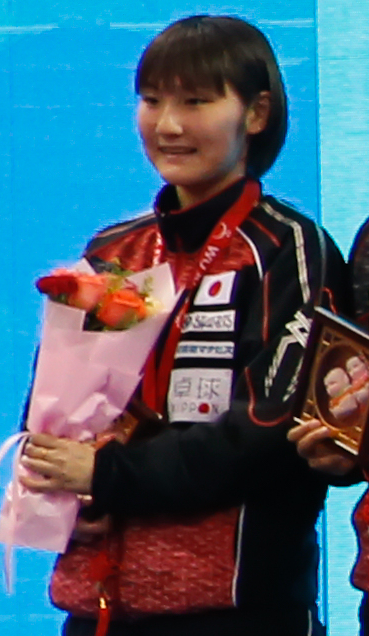
- Kato at the 2017 Asian Championships

Personal information
- Born: April 14, 1999 (age 27) Musashino, Tokyo, Japan
- Height: 159 cm (5 ft 3 in)
- Weight: 52 kg (115 lb)

Sport
- Sport: Table tennis
- Club: Nippon Paint Mallets
- Playing style: Right-handed shakehand grip
- Highest ranking: 13 (January 2018)
- Current ranking: 59 (17 May 2022)
Medal record
Women's table tennis
Representing Japan
Asian Championships
| Silver medal – second place | 2017 Wuxi | Team |
| Silver medal – second place | 2019 Yogyakarta | Team |
Summer Youth Olympics
| Silver medal – second place | 2014 Nanjing | Doubles |

Miyu Kato (加藤 美優, Katō Miyu; born April 14, 1999) is a Japanese table tennis player.

== Achievements ==
=== ITTF Tours ===
Women's singles

| Year | Tournament | Level | Final opponent | Score | Rank |
|---|---|---|---|---|---|
| 2018 | Slovenian Open | Challenge | Sakura Mori | 4–3 | 1st place, gold medalist(s) |
| 2019 | Spanish Open | Challenge | Adina Diaconu | 4–2 | 1st place, gold medalist(s) |
| 2019 | Croatia Open | Challenge | Miyuu Kihara | 3–4 | 2nd place, silver medalist(s) |

Women's doubles

| Year | Tournament | Level | Partner | Final opponents | Score | Rank |
|---|---|---|---|---|---|---|
| 2016 | Bulgarian Open | World Tour | Misaki Morizono | Maria Dolgikh; Polina Mikhailova | 3–0 | 1st place, gold medalist(s) |
| 2016 | Austrian Open | World Tour | Hina Hayata | Honoka Hashimoto; Hitomi Sato | 2–3 | 2nd place, silver medalist(s) |
| 2017 | Belarus Open | Challenge | Misaki Morizono | Lin Chia-hsuan; Lin Po-hsuan | 3–1 | 1st place, gold medalist(s) |
| 2017 | Polish Open | Challenge | Miyu Maeda | Lee Ho Ching; Doo Hoi Kem | 2–3 | 2nd place, silver medalist(s) |

== Career records ==
Singles

- World Junior Championships: 3rd (2016, 2017).

Doubles

- World Junior Championships: 2nd (2016), 3rd (2017).
- Asian Junior and Cadet Championships: 2nd (2013).

Team

- World Junior Championships: 1st (2016), 2nd (2017).
- Asian Championships: 2nd (2017, 2019).
- Asian Junior and Cadet Championships: 2nd (2013, 2014, 2015).
