= Sakura Mori =

Japanese table tennis player

Personal information
- Born: 17 April 1996 (age 30) Osaka, Japan
- Height: 159 cm (5 ft 3 in)

Sport
- Sport: Table tennis
- Club: Nippon Life Redelf (T.League)
- Playing style: Right-handed shakehand grip
- Highest ranking: 17 (February 2018)
- Current ranking: 26 (4 June 2024)
Medal record
Representing Japan
World Championships
Silver medal – second place	2014 Tokyo	Team

Sakura Mori (森 さくら, Mori Sakura; born 17 April 1996) is a Japanese table tennis player.

== Achievements ==
=== Women's singles ===
Result	Year	Tournament	Final opponent	Score	Ref
Winner	2017	ITTF World Tour, India Open	(Sweden) Matilda Ekholm	4–3	
Runner-up	2018	ITTF Challenge, Slovenian Open	(Japan) Miyu Kato	3–4	
Winner	2023	WTT Feeder Bangkok	(Japan) Asuka Sasao	3–0	
Winner	2023	WTT Feeder Stockholm	(Germany) Shan Xiaona	3–2	
Winner	2024	WTT Contender Mendoza	(Chinese Taipei) Huang Yi-hua	4–1	

=== Women's doubles ===
Result	Year	Tournament	Partner	Final opponents	Score	Ref
Winner	2015	ITTF World Tour, Belarus Open	Miyu Maeda	(Japan) Misaki Morizono / Sayaka Hirano	3–0	
Winner	2015	U.S. Open	Miyu Maeda	(Japan) Misaki Mori / Chihiro Hara	4–1	
Winner	2022	WTT Feeder Fremont	Asuka Sasao	(Chinese Taipei) Li Yu-jhun / Cheng I-ching	3–2	
Winner	2022	WTT Feeder Westchester	Asuka Sasao	(United States) Amy Wang / Jiangshan Guo	3–1	
Winner	2022	WTT Contender Lima	Asuka Sasao	(Chinese Taipei) Cheng Hsien-tzu / Huang Yu-wen	3–1	
Winner	2024	WTT Contender Mendoza	Miyu Nagasaki	(Chinese Taipei) Cheng Hsien-tzu / Chien Tung-chuan	3–0	
