= Asian Junior and Cadet Table Tennis Championships =

Annual table tennis tournament

Tournament information
- Sport: Table tennis
- Location: Asia
- Established: 1983
- Administrator: ATTU & ITTF
- Tournament format(s): Singles: Groups/Knockout; Doubles: Knockout; Team: Groups/Knockout

The Asian Junior and Cadet Table Tennis Championships is an annual table tennis tournament regarded as continental championships between juniors and cadets. The Asian Junior and Cadet Table Tennis Championships (AJCTTC) is one of the most prestigious events of the world junior table tennis circuit. It will be held under the supervision of the Asian Table Tennis Union (ATTU) and International Table Tennis Federation (ITTF). Cadet Championships was added in 1986 (2nd). The table below gives an overview of all host cities and countries of the Asia Junior Championships.

== Editions ==
Juniors : U19 / Cadets: U15

Edition	Year	Host city	Events (J+C)
1	1983	Manama, Bahrain	7+0
2	1986	Nagoya, Japan	7+2
3	1987	Kediri, Indonesia	7+4
4	1989	New Delhi, India	7+4
5	1994	Niigata, Japan	4+0
6	1997	Panaji, India	4+0
7	1999	Chennai, India	6+0
8	2001	Hong Kong, Hong Kong	6+0
9	2003	Hyderabad, India	7+2
10	2004	New Delhi, India	7+2
11	2005	New Delhi, India	7+2
12	2006	Kitakyushu, Japan	4+4
13	2007	Hoengseong, South Korea	6+4
14	2008	Singapore, Singapore	6+4
15	2009	Jaipur, India	6+4
16	2010	Bangkok, Thailand	6+4
17	2011	New Delhi, India	6+4
18	2012	Jiangyin, China	6+4
19	2013	Doha, Qatar	6+4
20	2014	Mumbai, India	7+4
21	2015	Kuala Lumpur, Malaysia	7+4
22	2016	Bangkok, Thailand	7+4
23	2017	Asan, South Korea	7+4
24	2018	Nay Pyi Taw, Myanmar	7+4
25	2019	Ulaanbaatar, Mongolia	7+4
26	2022	Vientiane, Laos	7+4
27	2023	Doha, Qatar	7+4
28	2024	Chongqing, China	7+4
29	2025	Tashkent, Uzbekistan	7+4
30	2026	Bangkok, Thailand	

== Medal table ==
- As of 2026:

Rank	Nation	Gold	Silver	Bronze	Total
1	China (CHN)	192	120	125	437
2	Japan (JPN)	38	59	117	214
3	South Korea (KOR)	37	60	113	210
4	North Korea (PRK)	10	7	20	37
5	India (IND)	6	7	34	47
6	Chinese Taipei (TPE)	5	25	78	108
7	Thailand (THA)	2	1	11	14
8	Hong Kong (HKG)	1	8	42	51
9	Singapore (SIN)	1	0	9	10
10	Iran (IRN)	0	1	3	4
11	Jordan (JOR)	0	1	0	1
12	Indonesia (INA)	0	0	4	4
13	Malaysia (MAS)	0	0	3	3
14	Kazakhstan (KAZ)	0	0	2	2
15	Sri Lanka (SRI)	0	0	1	1
15	United Arab Emirates (UAE)	0	0	1	1
15	Vietnam (VIE)	0	0	1	1
Totals (17 entries)		292	289	564	1,145

== See also ==
- ITTF World Youth Championships
- Asian Table Tennis Championships
- South East Asian Junior and Cadet Table Tennis Championships
- Asian Cup
- List of table tennis players
