= Hengky =

Hengky is a given name. Notable people with the name include:

- Hengky Ardiles (born 1981), Indonesian footballer
- Hengky Honandar (born 1964), Indonesian politician
