= Misaki Morizono =

Japanese table tennis player

Personal information
- Born: 16 April 1992 (age 34) Nishitōkyō, Tokyo, Japan
- Height: 149 cm (4 ft 11 in)
- Weight: 48 kg (106 lb)

Sport
- Sport: Table tennis
- Club: Top Nagoya
- Playing style: Right-handed shakehand grip
- Highest ranking: 25 (June 2015)
Medal record
Representing Japan
Asian Championships
Bronze medal – third place	2013 Busan	Women's team

Misaki Morizono (森薗 美咲, Morizono Misaki; born 16 April 1992) is a Japanese table tennis player. Her younger brother Masataka Morizono is also a table tennis player.

== Achievements ==
=== ITTF Tours ===
Women's singles

Year	Tournament	Level	Final opponent	Score	Rank
2014	Australian Open	World Tour	Feng Tianwei	0–4	2nd place, silver medalist(s)
2014	Belarus Open	World Tour	Sayaka Hirano	3–4	2nd place, silver medalist(s)
2016	Bulgaria Open	World Tour	Yuka Ishigaki	0–4	2nd place, silver medalist(s)

Women's doubles

Year	Tournament	Level	Partner	Final opponents	Score	Rank
2013	Kuwait Open	World Tour	Kasumi Ishikawa	Ding Ning; Li Xiaoxia	0–3	2nd place, silver medalist(s)
2015	Belarus Open	World Tour	Sayaka Hirano	Miyu Maeda; Sakura Mori	0–3	2nd place, silver medalist(s)
2016	Bulgaria Open	World Tour	Miyu Kato	Maria Dolgikh; Polina Mikhailova	3–0	1st place, gold medalist(s)
2017	Belarus Open	Challenge	Miyu Kato	Lin Chia-hsuan; Lin Po-hsuan	3–1	1st place, gold medalist(s)
