= Wen Jia (table tennis) =

Chinese table tennis player (born 1989)

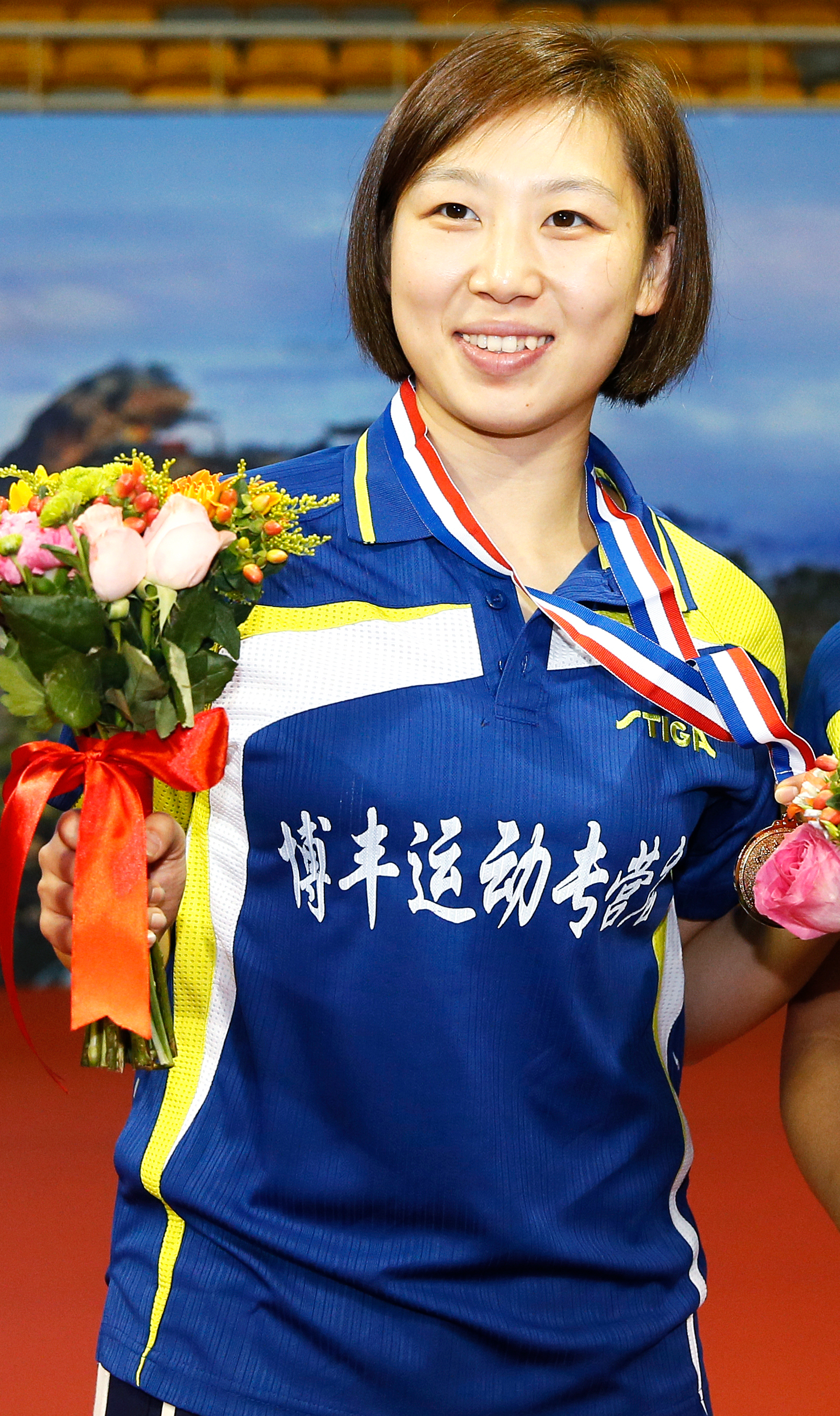
- Wen at the 2016 All China Table Tennis Championships

Personal information
- Born: 28 February 1989 (age 37) Dandong, Liaoning, China

Sport
- Sport: Table tennis
- Playing style: Left-handed shakehand grip
- Highest ranking: 19 (February 2012)
Medal record
Representing China
East Asian Games
| Silver medal – second place | 2009 Hong Kong | Women's singles |

Wen Jia (Chinese: 文佳; pinyin: Wén Jiā, born 28 February 1989) is a Chinese table tennis player.

== Achievements ==
=== ITTF Tours ===
Women's singles

| Year | Tournament | Level | Final opponent | Score | Rank |
|---|---|---|---|---|---|
| 2011 | China Open (Shenzhen) | World Tour | Feng Tianwei | 4–2 | 1st place, gold medalist(s) |
| 2013 | German Open | World Tour | Ai Fukuhara | 4–0 | 1st place, gold medalist(s) |
| 2017 | Hungarian Open | World Tour | Chen Xingtong | 1–4 | 2nd place, silver medalist(s) |
| 2018 | Czech Open | World Tour | Kasumi Ishikawa | 2–4 | 2nd place, silver medalist(s) |

Women's doubles

| Year | Tournament | Level | Partner | Final opponents | Score | Rank |
|---|---|---|---|---|---|---|
| 2012 | Qatar Open | World Tour | Li Xiaodan | Li Jiawei; Sun Beibei | 4–1 | 1st place, gold medalist(s) |
| 2013 | German Open | World Tour | Zhao Yan | Ai Fukuhara; Misako Wakamiya | 4–1 | 1st place, gold medalist(s) |
