= Feng Yalan =

Chinese table tennis player

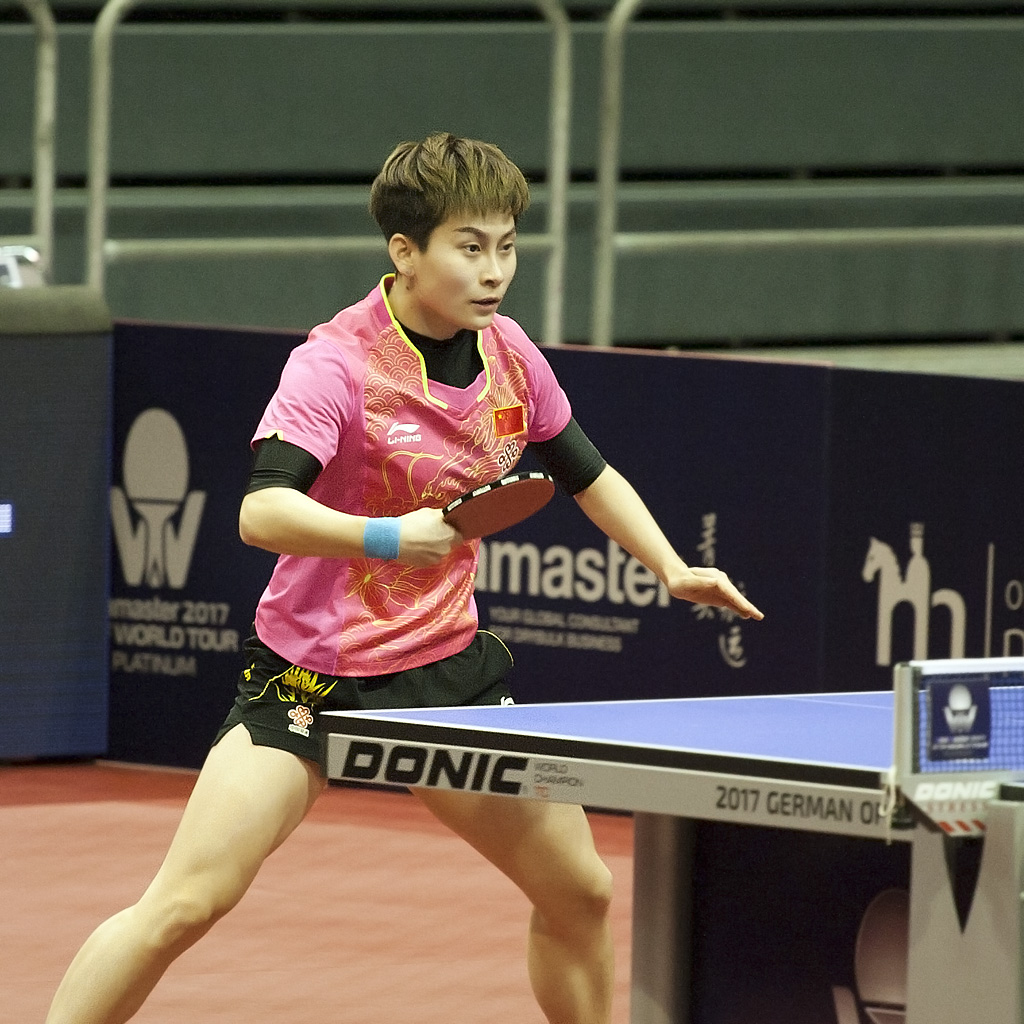
- ITTF World Tour 2017 German Open, Magdeburg, Germany

Personal information
- Full name: Feng Yalan
- Nationality: China
- Born: January 25, 1990 (age 36)

Sport
- Sport: Table tennis
- Playing style: Right-handed, shakehand grip
- Highest ranking: 10 (July 2013)

Feng Yalan (simplified Chinese: 冯亚兰; traditional Chinese: 馮亞蘭; pinyin: Féng Yǎ Lán; born January 25, 1990) is a female Chinese table tennis player.

== Career records ==
Singles (as of July 6, 2013)

- ITTF World Tour winner (3): 2010 German Open. 2012 German Open, Russian Open.
- World Junior Championships: winner (2006).
