= Li Xiaodan =

Chinese table tennis player

Personal information
- Nationality: Chinese
- Born: 6 March 1990 (age 35)

Sport
- Sport: Table tennis

Li Xiaodan (born 6 March 1990) is a Chinese table tennis player. Her highest career ITTF ranking was 33.
