= Kasumi Ishikawa =

Japanese table tennis player (born 1993)

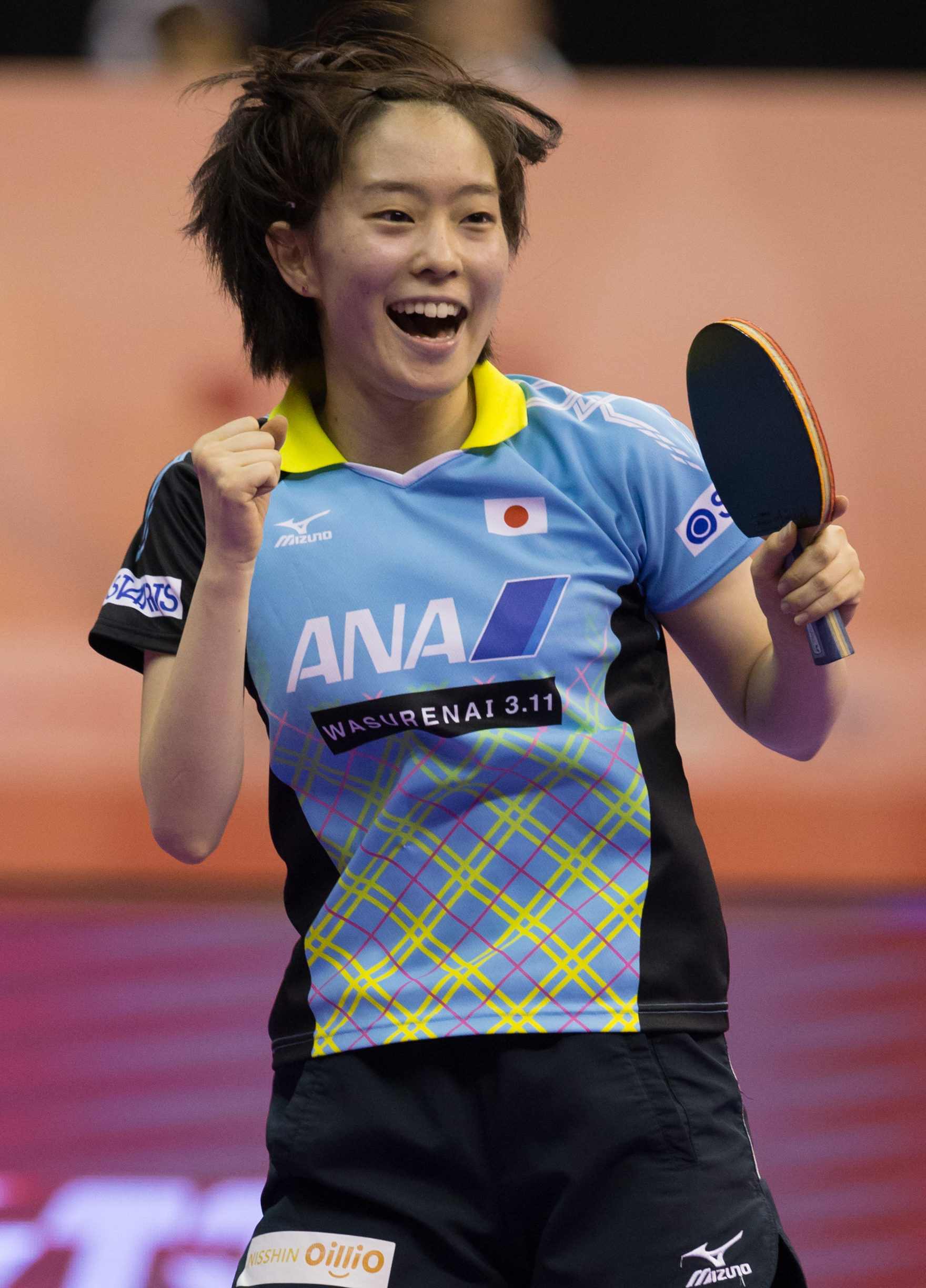
- Ishikawa celebrating at the 2016 World Team Table Tennis Championships

Personal information
- Nicknames: Kasumi-chan, Kasumin
- Nationality: Japanese
- Born: 23 February 1993 (age 33) Yamaguchi, Japan
- Height: 1.58 m (5 ft 2 in)
- Weight: 51 kg (112 lb)

Sport
- Sport: Table tennis
- Club: Kinoshita Abyell Kanagawa
- Playing style: Left-handed, Shakehand grip, Looper
- Equipment: Butterfly Viscaria, Butterfly Tenergy 64, DHS Neo Hurricane 3 National Blue Sponge
- Highest ranking: 3 (February 2017)
- Current ranking: 10 (May 2022)
Medal record
Representing Japan
Olympic Games
Silver medal – second place	2020 Tokyo	Team
Bronze medal – third place	2016 Rio de Janeiro	Team
Silver medal – second place	2012 London	Team
World Championships
Silver medal – second place	2019 Budapest	Mixed doubles
Silver medal – second place	2018 Halmstad	Team
Gold medal – first place	2017 Düsseldorf	Mixed doubles
Silver medal – second place	2016 Kuala Lumpur	Team
Silver medal – second place	2015 Suzhou	Mixed doubles
Silver medal – second place	2014 Tokyo	Team
Bronze medal – third place	2010 Moscow	Team
Bronze medal – third place	2008 Guangzhou	Team
Asian Games
Silver medal – second place	2014 Incheon	Team
Bronze medal – third place	2010 Guangzhou	Doubles
Bronze medal – third place	2010 Guangzhou	Mixed doubles

Kasumi Ishikawa (石川 佳純, Ishikawa Kasumi) (born 23 February 1993) is a retired Japanese table tennis player. A regular member of the Japanese national team, she won a silver medal at the 2012 Summer Olympics, a bronze at the 2016 Summer Olympics, and a silver medal at the 2020 Summer Olympics, in Women's team.

She is a left-handed inverted rubber shakehand player who primarily uses speedy top-spins and loops in offensive play.

== Biography ==
Kasumi Ishikawa's entire family, which consists of her father, mother, and younger sister, play or used to play competitive table tennis. She has a younger sister, Rira, who was also a professional table tennis player, while her mother Kumi Ishikawa is her current coach.

Upon graduation from Hirakawa Primary School in Yamaguchi, Ishikawa wrote in the yearbook of her dream to play in the Olympics. She first got public attention when she managed to defeat high school and even university students much older than her in her first ever All Japan Table Tennis Championships. Since 2007, she has won the All Japan Table Tennis Championships – female junior division; four years in a row. She was also nicknamed Ai-Chan II, a comparison to fellow athlete Ai Fukuhara, who also started playing table tennis at a young age. She models her underspin serve after Fukuhara.

Her talent for table tennis was due partly to her parents, both former players, who gave Ishikawa special training since she was young. Her mother, Kumi Ishikawa, had played at the national level. In the autumn of her first year of primary school, a special practice area in their house was erected to help her train more rigorously. After graduating from primary school, Ishikawa decided to live away from home and devote herself to table tennis. She entered Shitennoji Habikigaoka Middle School, and then Shitennoji High School in Osaka Prefecture. She practiced with all-Japan-Class players until late at night including holidays. Her aggressive attacking style coupled with formidable speed were developed there. She began working towards the Olympics and played in international tournaments representing her club; ZEN-NOH, Japan.

She competed at the 2009 World Table Tennis Championships, reaching the quarter-final of the singles competition. In 2011, she won the national singles title at the age of 17. She quickly rose through the world rankings in recent years and managed to secure a place to compete at the London 2012 Olympics. She is currently ranked 6th in the ITTF women's world ranking as of July 2012 but has achieved ranking as high as 5th. She is now the best female table tennis player in Japan after managing to overtake Ai Fukuhara in rankings.

She reached the semi-finals of the Women's Singles at the London 2012 Olympics but lost out to eventual gold medal winner; Li Xiaoxia of China. In the bronze medal play-off, she lost out to Feng Tianwei of Singapore. She finished an overall 4th position. This was her first ever Olympics participation and despite her young age of 19, she was seeded no. 4 at the Women's Singles Event. She is also the first ever Japanese to have reached the semi-finals of the tournament.

At the Women's Team Event semi-finals, Kasumi Ishikawa helped Japan to overcome Singapore by defeating her quarter-finals opponent in the Single's, Wang Yuegu in three straight games. In the third Double's game, she paired up with Sayaka Hirano to overcome Wang Yuegu and Li Jiawei in three straight games as well. The wins together with Ai Fukuhara overcoming Feng Tianwei in the first game brought Japan to their first table tennis finals in the Olympics in three straight matches. However, Japan failed to beat China in the finals but got their first ever silver medal in table tennis.

She won bronze with the Japanese Olympic team in Rio de Janeiro 2016, beating together with Ai Fukuhara and Mima Ito on her side the team from Singapore. She also represented Japan in the women's singles event, where she crashed out of the tournament after suffering a cramp in her leg, losing 4–3 to North Korea's Kim Song-i in their third-round match.

At the 2017 World Table Tennis Championships held in Düsseldorf, partnering compatriot Maharu Yoshimura in the mixed doubles event, Ishikawa and Yoshimura progressed through to the final, beating the combination of Fang Bo and Petrissa Solja in the semi-finals, and overcame the Taiwanese pair of Chen Chien-an and Cheng I-ching 4–3 to win the first title in this tournament. It was also Japan's first mixed doubles gold medal after 48 years.

In January 2020, she was announced to be part of the women's table tennis team for the 2020 Tokyo Olympics, together with Ito Mima and Miu Hirano. Furthermore, she will be making her third appearance in the Singles category with Ito Mima.

=== 2021 ===
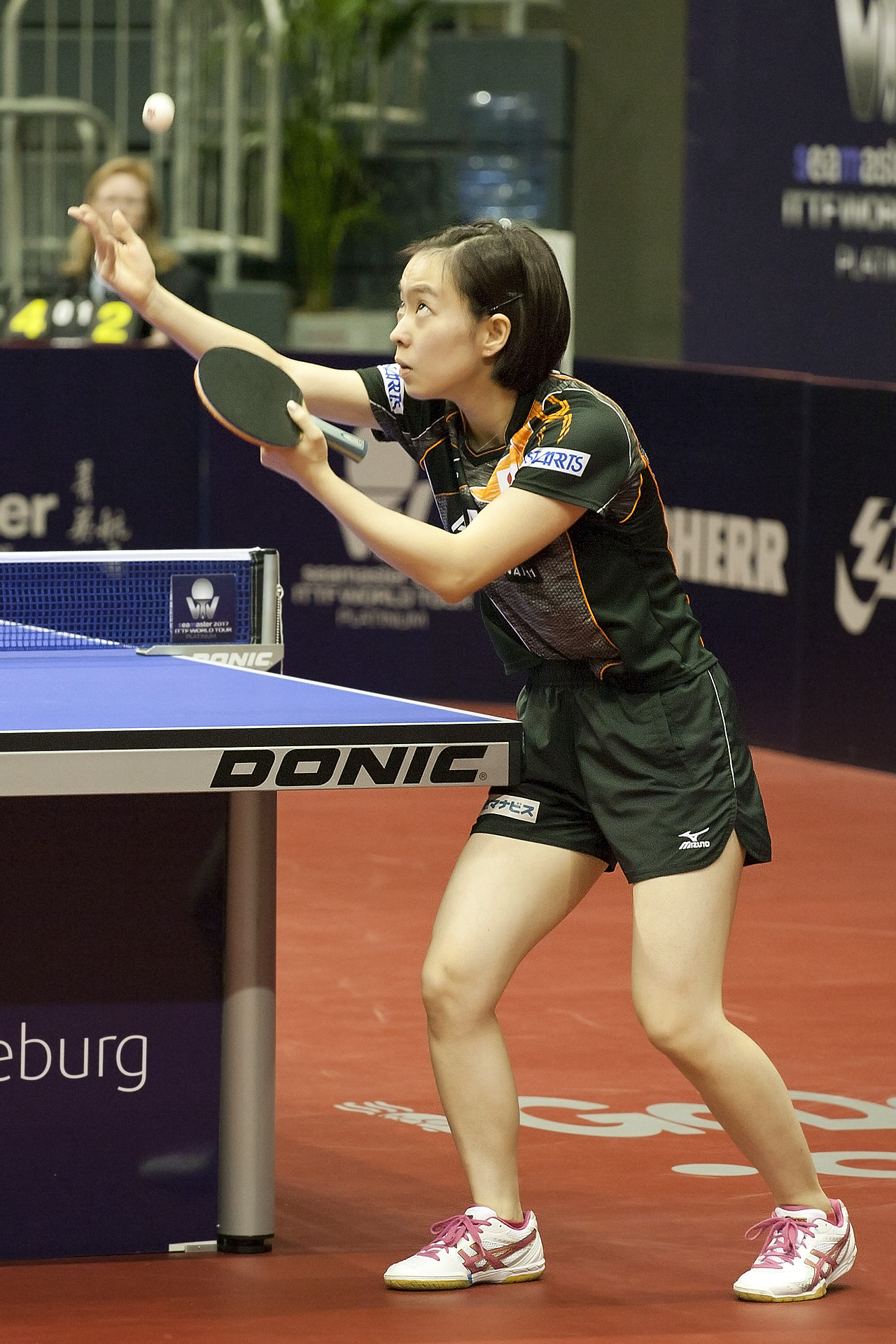
Ishikawa at the 2017 German Open.

Ishikawa defeated Miyuu Kihara in the semi-finals and Mima Ito in the finals to win the All Japan National Championships in 2021 for the first time in five years. Afterwards, Ishikawa said that she was enjoying practicing recently, which she attributed to the pandemic putting things in perspective.

In her first international event of 2021, Ishikawa was upset by Hina Hayata in the round of 16 in the WTT Contender event at WTT Doha.

In June, Ishikawa stated that she was 70% ready for the Tokyo Olympics and that she wanted to spend the final month preparing so that there would be no regrets.

Ishikawa lost in the quarter-finals of the Tokyo Olympics to Yu Mengyu of Singapore. Ishikawa won silver in the team event.

=== 2023 ===
On May 1, Ishikawa announced her retirement from international table tennis.

== Impact ==
In Japan, Ishikawa has ranked among the five "most-liked" sportswomen every year from 2014 to 2020 in surveys published by Oricon, after ranking No. 10 in 2013. As she is fluent in Mandarin which she learned from Chinese coaches, her popularity has also extended to China. When she opened a Sina Weibo account in 2016, she gained over 60,000 followers on the first day.

Ishikawa appeared in the 2017 film Mixed Doubles as herself.

== Career records ==
Singles

- All Japan Championship: 1st (2011, 2014, 2015, 2016, 2021), 2nd (2012, 2013, 2017, 2019).
- World Cup: 2nd (2015), 3rd (2014).
- World Tour Grand Finals: 1st (2014), 3rd (2016).
- Asian Championships: QF (2012).
- Table tennis at the 2012 Summer Olympics: 4th (2012).
- World Tour winner (8): Morocco Open (2010), Chile Open (2011), Russian Open (2014), Swedish Open (2016), Bulgaria Open (2015, 2017), German Open (2018), Czech Open (2018).
- World Championships: QF (2009, 2017).
- Asian Cup: 3rd (2007, 2013, 2017, 2018, 2019).

Doubles

- World Championships: round of 16 (2011).
- Pro Tour winner (6): Morocco Open (2009); German, Morocco, Hungarian Open (2010), Chile Open (2011), Bulgaria Open (2017).
- Pro Tour Grand Finals: runner-up (2011).
- Asian Games: SF (2010).

Mixed doubles

- World Championships: 1st (2017, 2019), 2nd (2015), round of 16 (2011).
- Asian Games: SF (2010).
- Asian Championships: QF (2009).

Team

- World Championships: 2nd (2014, 2016, 2018), 3rd (2008, 2010).
- World Team Cup: 2nd (2011, 2013, 2018, 2019); 3rd (2009, 2010, 2015).
- Table tennis at the 2012 Summer Olympics – Women's team: Silver (2012).
- Table tennis at the 2016 Summer Olympics – Women's team: Bronze (2016).
- Table tennis at the 2020 Summer Olympics – Women's team: Silver (2021).
