= Miyu Maeda =

Japanese table tennis player

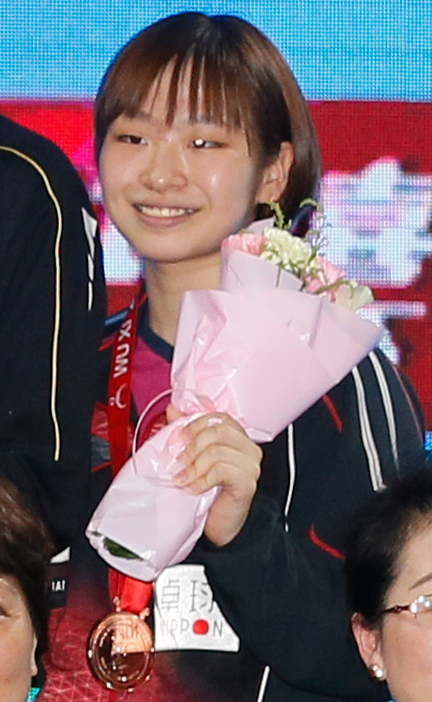
- Maeda at the 2017 Asian Championships

Personal information
- Born: 18 June 1996 (age 30) Mitoyo, Kagawa, Japan
- Height: 154 cm (5 ft 1 in)
- Weight: 51 kg (112 lb)

Sport
- Sport: Table tennis
- Club: Nissay Red Elf
- Playing style: Left-handed shakehand grip
- Highest ranking: 40 (July 2018)
Medal record
Representing Japan
Asian Championships
| Bronze medal – third place | 2017 Wuxi | Mixed doubles |

Miyu Maeda (前田 美優, Maeda Miyu; born 18 June 1996) is a Japanese table tennis player.

== Achievements ==
Women's singles

| Year | Tournament | Level | Final opponent | Score | Rank |
|---|---|---|---|---|---|
| 2014 | Chile Open | World Tour | Hina Hayata | 4–1 | 1st place, gold medalist(s) |
| 2015 | U.S. Open | | Liu Ying | 4–2 | 1st place, gold medalist(s) |

Women's doubles

| Year | Tournament | Level | Partner | Final opponents | Score | Rank |
|---|---|---|---|---|---|---|
| 2015 | Belarus Open | World Tour | Sakura Mori | Misaki Morizono; Sayaka Hirano | 3–0 | 1st place, gold medalist(s) |
| 2015 | U.S. Open | | Sakura Mori | Misaki Mori; Chihiro Hara | 4–1 | 1st place, gold medalist(s) |
| 2017 | Polish Open | Challenge | Miyu Kato | Lee Ho Ching; Doo Hoi Kem | 2–3 | 2nd place, silver medalist(s) |
