= Yang Ha-eun =

South Korean table tennis player

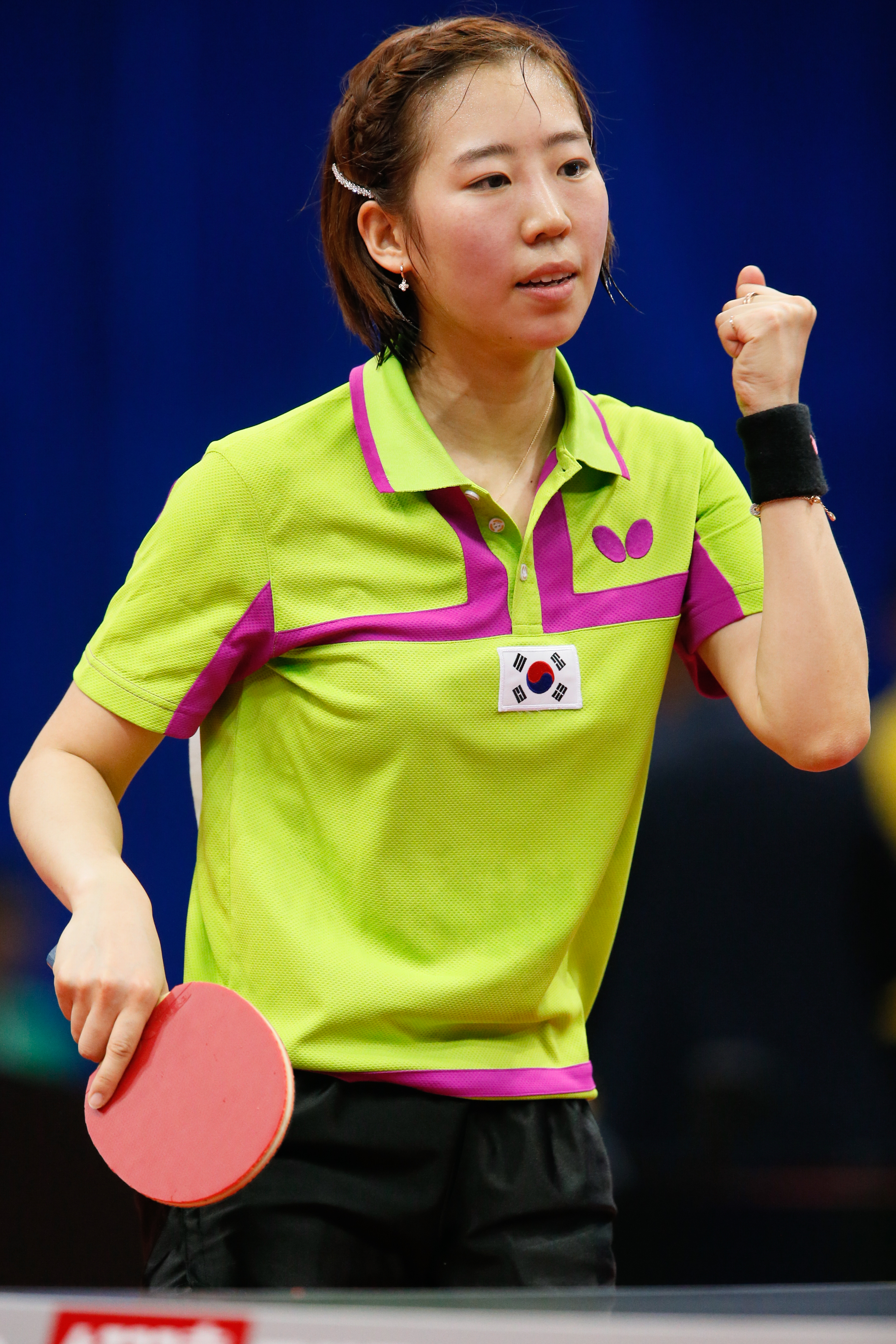
- Yang at the 2017 Asian Championships

Personal information
- Native name: 양하은
- Born: 25 February 1994 (age 32) Suwon, Gyeonggi-do, South Korea
- Height: 1.70 m (5 ft 7 in)
- Weight: 60 kg (132 lb)

Sport
- Sport: Table tennis
- Playing style: Right-handed, shakehand grip
- Highest ranking: 11 (February 2016)
- Current ranking: 58 (20 February 2024)
Medal record
Women's table tennis
Representing South Korea
World Championships
Gold medal – first place	2015 Suzhou	Mixed doubles
Bronze medal – third place	2012 Dortmund	Team
World Cup
Bronze medal – third place	2019 Tokyo	Team
Asian Games
Bronze medal – third place	2010 Guangzhou	Team
Bronze medal – third place	2014 Incheon	Singles
Bronze medal – third place	2018 Jakarta	Team
Bronze medal – third place	2022 Hangzhou	Team
Asian Championships
Silver medal – second place	2023 Pyeongchang	Team
Bronze medal – third place	2011 Macau	Team
Bronze medal – third place	2013 Busan	Doubles
Bronze medal – third place	2015 Pattaya	Team
Bronze medal – third place	2017 Wuxi	Team
Bronze medal – third place	2025 Bhubaneswar	Team
Summer Universiade
Bronze medal – third place	2015 Gwangju	Singles
Bronze medal – third place	2015 Gwangju	Doubles
Bronze medal – third place	2015 Gwangju	Team
Representing Korea
World Championships
Bronze medal – third place	2018 Halmstad	Team

Yang Ha-eun (born 25 February 1994) is a South Korean female table tennis player. She won two medals at the 2010 Summer Youth Olympics and she was a member of South Korean women's team at the 2012 World Team Championships. In 2015, she won a gold medal in mixed doubles event with Xu Xin at the World Championships.

== Career ==
=== 2021 ===
Yang opened 2021 playing better than her world ranking of 81 indicated, including wins over Suh Hyowon (WR 21) and Choi Hyojoo (WR 64) at the Korean Olympic trials and Melanie Diaz (WR 68) at WTT Doha.
