= Asian Table Tennis Union =

Asian tennis table governing body

- Abbreviation: ATTU
- Founded: May 7, 1972
- Affiliation: International Table Tennis Federation
- Affiliation date: 1975
- President: Khalil Al-Mohannadi

Official website
- asia.ittf.com/home

The Asian Table Tennis Union (ATTU) is an Asian table tennis governing body formed on May 7, 1972, and recognized by International Table Tennis Federation (ITTF) in 1975. ATTU was founded by 16 member associations, currently, 44 member associations are affiliated to ATTU.

== Founding history ==
After Chinese Civil War, fighting between China and Taiwan spread into diplomatic fields, including sports organizations. During the 1960s, Taiwan was not a member of International Table Tennis Federation (ITTF), but was affiliated to Table Tennis Federation of Asia (TTFA). China was totally opposite. In 1968, ITTF had decided that only those countries affiliated to ITTF be allowed to gain membership in its continental affiliates. Taiwan did not join ITTF because ITTF refused to recognize Taiwan as China while Taiwan was recognized by International Olympic Committee under the name of Republic of China. In February 1971, TTFA delegates thought the ITTF had no powers to dictate terms to the Asian body, and decided to keep Taiwan's membership which had existed since 1957. The decision caused Koji Koto, the president of TTFA, to resign. Koji Koto, as the president of Japan Table Tennis Association, later promised China that he would make an effort to withdraw Japan from TTFA and form a new group with Chinese.

On May 7, 1972, after 4-day meeting in Beijing, Asian Table Tennis Union (ATTU) was officially formed with 16 member associations: Cambodia, China, DPR Korea, Iran, Iraq, Japan, Kuwait, Lebanon, Malaysia, Nepal, Pakistan, Palestine, Singapore, Sri Lanka, Syria and North Vietnam. ATTU was officially recognized by International Table Tennis Federation as a continental body for Asia at its 33rd Congress in Calcutta, 1975.

== Members ==
Total 44 member associations of ATTU are divided into 5 regional groups: (March 2012)

Region (members)	Area of Jurisdiction	Member Associations
East Asia ( 8 )	China; Hong Kong; Japan; South Korea; Macau; Mongolia; North Korea; Chinese Taipei	Chinese Table Tennis Association; Hong Kong Table Tennis Association; Japan Table Tennis Association; Korea Table Tennis Association; Macao Table Tennis Association; Mongolian Table Tennis Federation; Table Tennis Association of the Democratic People's Republic of Korea; Chinese Taipei Table Tennis Association
Southeast Asia ( 10 )	Brunei; Cambodia; Indonesia; Laos; Malaysia; Myanmar; Philippines; Singapore; Thailand; Vietnam	Brunei Darussalam Table Tennis Association; Cambodia Table Tennis Federation; Indonesia Table Tennis Association; Lao Table Tennis Federation; Table Tennis Association of Malaysia; Myanmar Table Tennis Federation; Table Tennis Association of the Philippines; Singapore Table Tennis Association; Table Tennis Association of Thailand; Vietnam Table Tennis Federation
South Asia ( 7 )	Bangladesh; Bhutan; India; Maldives; Nepal; Pakistan; Sri Lanka	Bangladesh Table Tennis Federation; Bhutan Table Tennis Federation; Table Tennis Federation of India; Table Tennis Association of Maldives; All Nepal Table Tennis Association; Pakistan Table Tennis Federation; Table Tennis Association of Sri Lanka
West Asia ( 12 )	Bahrain; Iraq; Jordan; Kuwait; Lebanon; Oman; Palestine; Qatar; Saudi Arabia; Syria; United Arab Emirates; Yemen	Bahrain Table Tennis Association; Table Tennis Association of Iraq; Jordan Table Tennis Federation; Kuwait Table Tennis Association; Lebanese Table Tennis Federation; Oman Table Tennis & Squash Association; Palestine Table Tennis Association; Qatar Table Tennis Association; Saudi Arabian Table Tennis Federation; Syrian Arab Table Tennis Federation; United Arab Emirates Table Tennis Association; Yemen Table Tennis Association
Central Asia ( 7 )	Afghanistan; Iran; Kazakhstan; Kyrgyzstan; Tajikistan; Turkmenistan; Uzbekistan	Afghanistan National Table Tennis Federation; Table Tennis Federation of Islamic Republic of Iran; Table Tennis Federation of the Republic of Kazakhstan; Table Tennis Association of Kyrgyz Republic; Tadjikistan Republic Table Tennis Federation; Table Tennis Federation of Turkmenistan; Uzbekistan Table Tennis Federation

2 Associate Members affiliated to Oceania Table Tennis Federation (OTTF) and ITTF:
Australia – Australian Table Tennis Association
New Zealand – New Zealand Table Tennis Association Inc

Not an ATTU member but affiliated to ITTF:
Timor-Leste – East Timor Table Tennis Association

== Competitions ==
- List of events sanctioned by ATTU or ATTU regional groups:

Tournament	Inaugural Year	Interval (time/year)	Events^{[a]}						
Tournament	Inaugural Year	Interval (time/year)	MT	WT	MS	WS	MD	WD	XD
Asian Championships	1972	1/2	•	•	•	•	•	•	•
Asian Cup Table Tennis Tournament	1983	1/1			•	•			
Asian Junior Championships	1972	1/1	•	•	•	•	•	•	•
South East Asian Championships	1998	1/2	•	•	•	•	•	•	•
South East Asian Junior Championships	1993	1/1	•	•	•	•	•	•	•
South Asian Junior Championships			•	•	•	•	•	•	

- List of events held by ATTU members and other organizations:

Tournament	Inaugural Year	Interval (time/year)	Events^{[a]}						
Tournament	Inaugural Year	Interval (time/year)	MT	WT	MS	WS	MD	WD	XD
Asia-Europe Challenge	2009	2/1	•						
Asian Games	1958^{[b]}	1/4	•	•	•	•	•	•	•
South Asian Games		1/4	•	•	•	•	•	•	•
Southeast Asian Games	1965^{[b]}	1/2	•	•	•	•	•	•	•
East Asian Games	2009^{[b]}	1/4	•	•	•	•	•	•	•
Asian University Table Tennis Championships	2008	1/2	•	•	•	•	•	•	•

a. MT/WT: Men's/Women's Teams; MS/WS: Men's/Women's Singles; MD/WD: Men's/Women's Doubles; XD: Mixed Doubles
b. Indicates the year in which table tennis was first included as competition sports, NOT the inauguration of the multi-sports events.

== See also ==
- International Table Tennis Federation
- European Table Tennis Union
