= 2020 in sports by month =

== Calendar by month ==
=== January ===
Date	Sport	Venue/Event	Status	Winner/s
13 December 2019–1	Darts	(England) 2020 PDC World Darts Championship	International	(Scotland) Peter Wright
1	Ice hockey	(United States) 2020 NHL Winter Classic	Domestic	(Texas) Dallas Stars
26 December 2019–2	Ice hockey	(Slovakia) 2020 IIHF World Women's U18 Championship	International	United States
2–8	Ice hockey	(Poland) 2020 IIHF World Women's U18 Championship Division I – Group B	International	Norway
3–9	Ice hockey	(Germany) 2020 IIHF World Women's U18 Championship Division I – Group A	International	Germany
3–12	Tennis	(Australia) 2020 ATP Cup	International	Serbia
3–24	Chess	(China) / (Russia) Women's World Chess Championship 2020	International	(China) Ju Wenjun
4–12	Darts	(England) 2020 BDO World Darts Championship	International	Men: (Wales) Wayne Warren; Women: (Japan) Mikuru Suzuki
26 December 2019–5	Ice hockey	(Czech Republic) 2020 World Junior Ice Hockey Championships	International	Canada
28 December 2019–5	Cross-country skiing	(Switzerland) / (Italy) 2019–20 Tour de Ski	International	Men: (Russia) Alexander Bolshunov; Women: (Norway) Therese Johaug
5–17	Rally raid	(Saudi Arabia) 2020 Dakar Rally	International	Cars: (Spain) Carlos Sainz; Bikes: (United States) Ricky Brabec; Quads: (Chile) Ignacio Casale; Trucks: (Russia) Andrey Karginov; UTV: (United States) Casey Currie
28 December 2019–6	Ski jumping	(Germany) / (Austria) 2019–20 Four Hills Tournament	International	(Poland) Dawid Kubacki
6–12	Ice hockey	(Lithuania) 2020 World Junior Ice Hockey Championships – Division II – Group A	International	Japan
8–26	Association football	(Thailand) 2020 AFC U-23 Championship	Continental	South Korea
9–22	Multi-sport	(Switzerland) 2020 Winter Youth Olympics	International	Russia
9–26	Handball	(Austria) / (Norway) / (Sweden) 2020 European Men's Handball Championship	Continental	Spain
10–12	Speed skating	(Netherlands) 2020 European Speed Skating Championships	Continental	Netherlands
10–13	Speed skating	(Canada) 2020 Four Continents Short Track Speed Skating Championships	International	Men: (South Korea) Hwang Dae-heon; Women: (South Korea) Choi Min-jeong
10–26	Bowls	(England) 2020 World Indoor Bowls Championship	International	Open: (England) Robert Paxton; Women: (Scotland) Julie Forrest
12–19	Snooker	(England) 2020 Masters (Triple Crown #2)	International	(England) Stuart Bingham
12–25	Water polo	(Hungary) 2020 Women's European Water Polo Championship	Continental	Spain
13	American football	(United States) 2020 College Football Playoff National Championship	Domestic	(Louisiana) LSU Tigers
13–19	Ice hockey	(Bulgaria) 2020 World Junior Ice Hockey Championships – Division III	International	Iceland
14–26	Water polo	(Hungary) 2020 Men's European Water Polo Championship	Continental	Hungary
16–26	Handball	(Tunisia) 2020 African Men's Handball Championship	Continental	Egypt
16–27	Handball	(Kuwait) 2020 Asian Men's Handball Championship	Continental	Qatar
17–19	Indoor hockey	(Germany) 2020 Men's EuroHockey Indoor Nations Championship	Continental	Germany
17–9 February	Cricket	(South Africa) 2020 Under-19 Cricket World Cup	International	Bangladesh
18	Formula racing	(Chile) 2020 Santiago ePrix (FE #3)	International	(Germany) Maximilian Günther ( (Germany) BMW i Andretti Motorsport)
18–19	Luge	(Norway) 2020 FIL European Luge Championships	Continental	Russia
19–26	Netball	(England) 2020 Netball Nations Cup	International	New Zealand
20–26	Figure skating	(Austria) 2020 European Figure Skating Championships	Continental	Russia
20–2 February	Tennis	(Australia) 2020 Australian Open (Grand Slam #1)	International	Men: (Serbia) Novak Djokovic; Women: (United States) Sofia Kenin
21–25	Handball	(Brazil) 2020 South and Central American Men's Handball Championship	Continental	Argentina
23–26	Rallying	(Monaco) 2020 Monte Carlo Rally (WRC #1)	International	WRC: (Belgium) Thierry Neuville & (Belgium) Nicolas Gilsoul ( (South Korea) Hyundai Shell Mobis WRT); WRC-2: (Norway) Mads Østberg & (Norway) Torstein Eriksen ( (France) PH-Sport); WRC-3: (France) Eric Camilli & (France) François-Xavier Buresi
24–26	Indoor hockey	(Belarus) 2020 Women's EuroHockey Indoor Nations Championship	Continental	Belarus
24–26	Speed skating	(Hungary) 2020 European Short Track Speed Skating Championships	Continental	Men: (Hungary) Shaoang Liu; Women: (Netherlands) Suzanne Schulting
25	Ice hockey	(United States) 2020 National Hockey League All-Star Game	Domestic	Pacific Division
25–26	Rugby sevens	2020 New Zealand Sevens (WRSS #3); 2020 New Zealand Women's Sevens (WRWSS #4)	International	Men: New Zealand; Women: New Zealand
25–28	Ice hockey	(Netherlands) 2020 IIHF World Women's U18 Championship Division II – Group A	International	Chinese Taipei
26	American football	(United States) 2020 Pro Bowl	Domestic	American Football Conference
26–2 February	Biathlon	(Switzerland) Biathlon Junior World Championships 2020	International	Norway; Russia
28–2 February	Ice hockey	(Mexico) 2020 IIHF World Women's U18 Championship Division II – Group B	International	Spain
28–3 February	Ice hockey	(South Korea) 2020 World Junior Ice Hockey Championships – Division II – Group B	International	South Korea
28–7 February	Futsal	(Morocco) 2020 Africa Futsal Cup of Nations	Continental	Morocco
31	Luge	(Germany) 2020 FIL Junior European Luge Championships	Continental	Germany
31–2 February	Speed skating	(United States) 2020 Four Continents Speed Skating Championships	International	South Korea
31–2 February	Speed skating	(Italy) 2020 World Junior Short Track Speed Skating Championships	International	South Korea

=== February ===
Date	Sport	Venue/Event	Status	Winner/s
1–2	Cyclo-cross	(Switzerland) 2020 UCI Cyclo-cross World Championships	International	Men: (Netherlands) Mathieu van der Poel; Women: (Netherlands) Ceylin del Carmen Alvarado
1–2	Rugby sevens	(Australia) 2020 Sydney Sevens (WRSS #4); (Australia) 2020 Sydney Women's Sevens (WRWSS #5)	International	Men: Fiji; Women: New Zealand
1–2	Athletics	(Bolivia) 2020 South American Indoor Championships in Athletics	Continental	Brazil
1–31 October	Rugby union	(England) / (France) / (Ireland) / (Italy) / (Scotland) / (Wales) 2020 Six Nations Championship	Continental	England
1–TBA	Rugby union	(Belgium) / (Georgia (country)) / (Portugal) / (Romania) / (Russia) / (Spain) 2020 Rugby Europe Championship	Continental	Georgia
2	American football	(United States) Super Bowl LIV	Domestic	(Missouri) Kansas City Chiefs
2–6 December	Rugby union	(England) / (France) / (Ireland) / (Italy) / (Scotland) / (Wales) 2020 Women's Six Nations Championship	Continental	England
3–9	Snooker	(England) 2020 World Grand Prix (Coral Series #1)	International	(Australia) Neil Robertson
4–9	Figure skating	(South Korea) 2020 Four Continents Figure Skating Championships	International	Japan
4–9	Wrestling	(Algeria) 2020 African Wrestling Championships	Continental	Algeria
7–9	Basketball	(Spain) 2020 FIBA Intercontinental Cup	International	(Spain) Iberostar Tenerife
7–9	Table tennis	(Puerto Rico) 2020 ITTF Pan-America Cup	Continental	Men: (Brazil) Hugo Calderano; Women: (Puerto Rico) Adriana Díaz
8–9	Table tennis	(Switzerland) 2020 Europe Top 16 Cup	Continental	Men: (Germany) Timo Boll; Women: (Germany) Petrissa Solja
9–16	Sailing	(Australia) 2020 Laser World Championships	International	Men: (Germany) Philipp Buhl
10–13	Badminton	(Egypt) 2020 All Africa Team Badminton Championships	Continental	Men: Algeria; Women: Egypt
10–15	Badminton	(Australia) 2020 Oceania Badminton Championships	Continental	Men: (New Zealand) Abhinav Manota; Women: (Australia) Chen Hsuan-yu; Teams (M/W): Australia
10–15	Sailing	(Australia) 2020 49er & 49er FX World Championships (Australia) 2020 Nacra 17 World Championship	International	49er: (New Zealand) Peter Burling / Blair Tuke; 49er FX: (Spain) Támara Echegoyen / Paula Barceló; Nacra 17: (United Kingdom) John Gimson / Anna Burnet
10–16	Wrestling	(Italy) 2020 European Wrestling Championships	Continental	Freestyle: Russia; Greco-Roman: Russia; Women: Russia
11–16	Badminton	(Philippines) 2020 Badminton Asia Team Championships	Continental	Men: Indonesia; Women: Japan
11–16	Badminton	(France) 2020 European Team Badminton Championships	Continental	Men: Denmark; Women: Denmark
12–23	Biathlon	(Italy) Biathlon World Championships 2020	International	Norway
13–16	Badminton	(Brazil) 2020 Pan Am Badminton Championships (Team)	Continental	Men: Canada; Women: Canada
13–16	Rallying	2020 Rally Sweden (WRC #2)	International	WRC: (United Kingdom) Elfyn Evans & (United Kingdom) Scott Martin ( (Japan) Toyota Gazoo Racing WRT); WRC-2: (Norway) Mads Østberg & (Norway) Torstein Eriksen ( (France) PH-Sport); WRC-3: (Finland) Jari Huttunen & (Finland) Mikko Lukka; J-WRC: (Sweden) Tom Kristensson & (Sweden) Joakim Sjöberg ( (Sweden) Tom Kristensson Motorsport)
13–16	Speed skating	(United States) 2020 World Single Distances Speed Skating Championships	International	Netherlands
14	Association football	(Qatar) 2020 CAF Super Cup (February)	Continental	(Egypt) Zamalek
14–16	Badminton	(Egypt) 2020 African Badminton Championships	Continental	Men: (Mauritius) Georges Paul; Women: (Mauritius) Kate Foo Kune
14–16	Luge	(Russia) 2020 FIL World Luge Championships	International	Russia
15	Formula racing	2020 Mexico City ePrix (FE #4)	International	(New Zealand) Mitch Evans ( (United Kingdom) Jaguar)
15–22	Curling	(Russia) 2020 World Junior Curling Championships	International	Men: Canada; Women: Canada
16	Basketball	(United States) 2020 NBA All-Star Game	Domestic	Team LeBron; MVP: (California) Kawhi Leonard ( (California) Los Angeles Clippers)
16	Stock car racing	(United States) 2020 Daytona 500	Domestic	(Florida) Denny Hamlin ( (North Carolina) Joe Gibbs Racing)
18–23	Wrestling	(India) 2020 Asian Wrestling Championships	Continental	Freestyle: Iran; Greco-Roman: Iran; Women: Japan
19–22	Bandy	(Norway) 2020 Women's Bandy World Championship	International	Sweden
19–26	Association football	(Ecuador) / (Brazil) 2020 Recopa Sudamericana	Continental	(Brazil) Flamengo
20–23	Golf	2020 WGC-Mexico Championship	International	(United States) Patrick Reed
21–22	Luge	(Germany) 2020 Junior World Luge Championships	International	Germany
21–23	Speed skating	(Poland) 2020 World Junior Speed Skating Championships	International	Men: (Russia) Stepan Chistiakov; Women: (Netherlands) Femke Kok
21–28	Sailing	(Australia) 2020 ILCA Laser Radial World Championships	International	Men: (Russia) Daniil Krutskikh; Women: (Netherlands) Marit Bouwmeester
21–1 March	Bobsleigh & Skeleton	(Germany) IBSF World Championships 2020	International	Germany
21–8 March	Cricket	(Australia) 2020 ICC Women's T20 World Cup	International	Australia
22	Professional boxing	(United States) Deontay Wilder vs. Tyson Fury II	International	(United Kingdom) Tyson Fury
22	Rugby league	(England) 2020 World Club Challenge	International	(Australia) Sydney Roosters
22–8 March	Association football	(Dominican Republic) 2020 CONCACAF Women's U-20 Championship	Continental	United States
22–22 November	Stock car racing	(United States) 2020 NASCAR Xfinity Series	Domestic	(Ohio) Austin Cindric ( (North Carolina) Team Penske)
23	Endurance racing	(United States) 2020 Lone Star Le Mans (WEC #5)	International	LMP1: (United States) Gustavo Menezes & (France) Norman Nato & (Brazil) Bruno Senna ( (Switzerland) Rebellion Racing); LMP2: (Portugal) Filipe Albuquerque & (United Kingdom) Philip Hanson & (United Kingdom) Paul di Resta ( (United Kingdom) United Autosports); LMGTE Pro: (Denmark) Marco Sørensen & (Denmark) Nicki Thiim ( (United Kingdom) Aston Martin Racing); LMGTE Am: (United Kingdom) Jonathan Adam & (Republic of Ireland) Charlie Eastwood & (Turkey) Salih Yoluç ( (United Kingdom) TF Sport)
23–29	Ice hockey	(Iceland) 2020 IIHF Women's World Championship Division II – Group B	International	Australia
23–29	Windsurfing	(New Zealand) 2020 RS:X World Championships	International	Men: (Netherlands) Kiran Badloe; Women: (Netherlands) Lilian de Geus
23–1 March	Shooting sports	(Poland) 2020 10m European Shooting Championships	Continental	Russia
23–23 November	Stock car racing	(United States) 2020 Monster Energy NASCAR Cup Series	Domestic	(Georgia (U.S. state)) Chase Elliott ( (North Carolina) Hendrick Motorsports)
24–1 March	Snooker	(England) 2020 Players Championship (Coral Series #2)	International	(England) Judd Trump
26–1 March	Biathlon	(Belarus) 2020 IBU Open European Championships	Continental	Belarus
26–1 March	Track cycling	(Germany) 2020 UCI Track Cycling World Championships	International	Netherlands
28–29	Speed skating	(Norway) 2020 World Sprint Speed Skating Championships	International	Men: (Japan) Tatsuya Shinhama; Women: (Japan) Miho Takagi
28–1 March	Table tennis	(China) 2020 ITTF-ATTU Asian Cup	Continental	Cancelled
29	Cross country running	(Canada) 2020 Pan American Cross Country Cup	Continental	Men: (Brazil) Johnatas de Oliveira Cruz; Women: (Canada) Geneviève Lalonde
29	Formula racing	(Morocco) 2020 Marrakesh ePrix (FE #5)	International	(Portugal) António Félix da Costa ( (China) DS Techeetah)
29	Horse racing	(Saudi Arabia) 2020 Saudi Cup	International	Horse: (United States) Maximum Security; Jockey: (Panama) Luis Saez; Trainer: (United States) Jason Servis
29–1 March	Rugby sevens	(United States) 2020 USA Sevens (WRSS #5)	International	South Africa
29–1 March	Speed skating	(Norway) 2020 World Allround Speed Skating Championships	International	Men: (Netherlands) Patrick Roest; Women: (Netherlands) Ireen Wüst
29–7 March	Curling	(Switzerland) 2020 World Wheelchair Curling Championship	International	Russia
29–8 March	Nordic skiing	(Germany) 2020 Nordic Junior World Ski Championships	International	Norway

=== March ===
Date	Sport	Venue/Event	Status	Winner/s
1	Marathon	(Japan) 2020 Tokyo Marathon (WMM #1)	International	Men: (Ethiopia) Birhanu Legese; Women: (Israel) Lonah Chemtai Salpeter
2–8	Figure skating	(Estonia) 2020 World Junior Figure Skating Championships	International	Russia
4–8	Table tennis	(Croatia) 2020 European Under-21 Table Tennis Championships	Continental	Men: (Russia) Vladimir Sidorenko; Women: (France) Prithika Pavade
4–20	Association football	(Argentina) 2020 South American Under-20 Women's Football Championship	Continental	Suspended; remaining matches cancelled due to the COVID-19 pandemic
5–14	Alpine skiing	(Norway) World Junior Alpine Skiing Championships 2020	International	Austria
6–7	Triathlon	(United Arab Emirates) 2020 ITU World Triathlon Series #1	International	Cancelled
6–8	Darts	(England) 2020 UK Open	International	(Netherlands) Michael van Gerwen
6–9	Wrestling	(Canada) 2020 Pan American Wrestling Championships	Continental	Freestyle: United States; Greco-Roman: United States; Women: United States
7	Cross country running	(Morocco) 2020 World University Cross Country Championships	International	Cancelled
7–8	Rugby sevens	2020 Canada Sevens (WRSS #6)	International	New Zealand
8	Motorcycle racing	2020 Qatar motorcycle Grand Prix (MotoGP #1)	International	MotoGP: Cancelled due to the COVID-19 pandemic; Moto2: (Japan) Tetsuta Nagashima ( (Finland) Red Bull KTM Ajo); Moto3: (Spain) Albert Arenas ( (Spain) Aspar Team)
10–13	Speed skating	(Netherlands) 2020 World University Speed Skating Championships	International	Netherlands
11–15	Biathlon	(Austria) 2020 IBU Junior Open European Championships	Continental	Czech Republic and Slovenia
12–15	Golf	(United States) 2020 Players Championship	International	Cancelled after completion of Day 1 due to the COVID-19 pandemic
12–15	Rallying	2020 Rally Mexico (WRC #3)	International	WRC: (France) Sébastien Ogier & (France) Julien Ingrassia ( (Japan) Toyota Gazoo Racing WRT); WRC-2: (Sweden) Pontus Tidemand & (Sweden) Patrick Barth ( (Germany) Toksport WRT); WRC-3: (Bolivia) Marco Bulacia Wilkinson & (Italy) Giovanni Bernacchini
12–22	Tennis	(United States) 2020 Indian Wells Masters	International	Cancelled due to the COVID-19 pandemic
13–14	Synchronized skating	(United Kingdom) 2020 ISU World Junior Synchronized Skating Championships	International	(Finland) Team Fintastic
13–15	Speed skating	(South Korea) 2020 World Short Track Speed Skating Championships	International	Postponed; new dates TBA
13–21	Sailing	(Spain) 2020 470 World Championships	International	Postponed; new dates TBA
14	Triathlon	(Australia) 2020 ITU Triathlon World Cup #1	International	Postponed; new dates TBA
14–21	Weightlifting	(Romania) 2020 IWF World Junior Weightlifting Championships	International	Cancelled due to the COVID-19 pandemic
14–22	Curling	(Canada) 2020 World Women's Curling Championship	International	Cancelled due to the COVID-19 pandemic
15	Formula One	(Australia) 2020 Australian Grand Prix	International	Cancelled due to the COVID-19 pandemic (Note: The Australian Grand Prix was cancelled, but organisers announced their intention to reschedule the race.)
15–20 September	Indy car racing	(United States) / (Canada) 2020 IndyCar Series	International	Postponed; new dates TBA
16–22	Figure skating	(Canada) 2020 World Figure Skating Championships	International	Cancelled due to the COVID-19 pandemic
17–4 April	Chess	(Russia) Candidates Tournament 2020	International	Postponed half way due to the COVID-19 pandemic; resceduling TBA
17–6 April	Basketball	(United States) 2020 NCAA Division I men's basketball tournament	Domestic	Cancelled due to the COVID-19 pandemic
20–5 April	Basketball	(United States) 2020 NCAA Division I women's basketball tournament	Domestic	Cancelled due to the COVID-19 pandemic
21	Formula racing	(China) 2020 Sanya ePrix	International	Cancelled due to the COVID-19 pandemic
21	Road bicycle racing	(Italy) 2020 Milan–San Remo (Monument #1)	International	Postponed to 8 August 2020
22	Triathlon	(United States) 2020 ITU Triathlon World Cup #2	International	Postponed; new dates TBA
24–5 April	Tennis	(United States) 2020 Miami Open	International	Cancelled due to the COVID-19 pandemic
25–29	Golf	(United States) 2020 WGC-Dell Technologies Match Play	International	Cancelled due to the COVID-19 pandemic
26–27 September	Baseball	(Canada) / (United States) 2020 MLB season	Domestic	Postponed to 23 July-27 September
28	Horse racing	(United Arab Emirates) 2020 Dubai World Cup	International	Cancelled due to the COVID-19 pandemic
28	Triathlon	(New Zealand) 2020 ITU Triathlon World Cup #3	International	Postponed; new dates TBA
28–5 April	Curling	(Scotland) 2020 World Men's Curling Championship	International	Cancelled due to the COVID-19 pandemic
29–May 24	Cricket	(India) Indian Premier League 2020	Domestic	Postponed due to the COVID-19 pandemic. It is planned to start on September 19 2020.
29–5 April	Bandy	(Russia) 2020 Bandy World Championship	International	Postponed; new dates TBA
31–10 April	Ice hockey	(Canada) 2020 IIHF Women's World Championship	International	Cancelled due to the COVID-19 pandemic

=== April ===
Date	Sport	Venue/Event	Status	Winner/s
3	Triathlon	(Brazil) 2020 ITU Triathlon World Cup #4	International	Postponed; new dates TBA
4–12	Weightlifting	(Russia) 2020 European Weightlifting Championships	Continental	Postponed; new dates TBA
4–25	Association football	(Cameroon) 2020 African Nations Championship	Continental	Postponed; new dates TBA
5	Formula One	(Vietnam) 2020 Vietnamese Grand Prix	International	Cancelled due to the COVID-19 pandemic
5	Road bicycle racing	(Belgium) 2020 Tour of Flanders (Monument #2)	International	Postponed to 18 October 2020
11–12	Triathlon	(Egypt) 2020 African Triathlon Championships	Continental	Postponed; new dates TBA
11–18	Water skiing	(Australia) 2020 IWWF World Barefoot Waterski Championships	International	Postponed; new dates TBA
12	Road bicycle racing	(France) 2020 Paris–Roubaix (Monument #3)	International	Postponed to 25 October 2020
13–19	Tennis	(Monaco) 2020 Monte-Carlo Masters	International	Cancelled due to the COVID-19 pandemic
14–19	Tennis	(Hungary) 2020 Fed Cup Finals	International	Postponed to 13–18 April 2021
16–19	Rallying	2020 Rally Chile	International	Cancelled due to political unrest
22 October 2019–15	Basketball	(United States) / (Canada) 2019–20 NBA season	Domestic	Suspended on 11 March 2020 due to the COVID-19 pandemic; see below
18	Triathlon	(Bermuda) 2020 ITU World Triathlon Series #2	International	Postponed; new dates TBA
18–25	Curling	(Canada) 2020 World Mixed Doubles Curling Championship; (Canada) 2020 World Senior Curling Championships	International	Postponed; new date TBA; Postponed; new date TBA
19	Formula One	(China) 2020 Chinese Grand Prix	International	Cancelled due to the COVID-19 pandemic
20	Marathon	(United States) 2020 Boston Marathon (WMM #2)	International	Cancelled due to the COVID-19 pandemic (Note: The event was initially postponed to 14 September 2020 due to the rising cases of the coronavirus pandemic, it was later announced its cancellation on 28 May 2020.)
23–25	American football	(United States) 2020 NFL draft	Domestic	#1 pick: (Iowa) Joe Burrow; (to the (Ohio) Cincinnati Bengals from the (Louisiana) LSU Tigers)
23–26	Badminton	(Guatemala) 2020 Pan Am Badminton Championships (Individual)	Continental	Postponed; new date TBA
23–26	Rallying	2020 Rally Argentina	International	Cancelled due to the COVID-19 pandemic
25–26	Triathlon	(Mexico) 2020 ITU Triathlon World Cup #5	International	Postponed; new dates TBA
26	Road bicycle racing	(Belgium) 2020 Liège–Bastogne–Liège (Monument #4)	International	Postponed to 4 October 2020

=== May ===
Date	Sport	Venue/Event	Status	Winner/s
1–10	Futsal	(Guatemala) 2020 CONCACAF Futsal Championship	Continental	Postponed; new dates TBA
1–10	Tennis	(Spain) 2020 Madrid Open	International	Cancelled due to the COVID-19 pandemic (Note: This event was first postponed from the May schedule, then initially rescheduled to 12–20 September 2020, it was later cancelled due to the COVID-19 pandemic in Spain.)
2	Triathlon	(Spain) 2020 ITU Triathlon World Cup #6	International	Postponed; new dates TBA
2–3	Athletics	(Belarus) 2020 IAAF World Race Walking Team Championships	International	Postponed; new dates TBA
3	Formula One	(Netherlands) 2020 Dutch Grand Prix	International	Cancelled due to the COVID-19 pandemic
9–17	Surfing	(El Salvador) 2020 ISA World Surfing Games	International	Postponed until 8–16 May 2021
9–22	Association football	(Sweden) 2020 UEFA Women's Under-17 Championship	Continental	Postponed; new dates TBA
14–17	Mountain bike racing	(Austria) 2020 European Mountain Bike Championships (XCE, XCO, & XCR)	Continental	Postponed; new dates october 15-18
16	Horse racing	(United States) 2020 Preakness Stakes (Triple Crown #2)	Domestic	Postponed; new date TBA
16	Triathlon	(Japan) 2020 ITU World Triathlon Series #3	International	Postponed; new date TBA
17–23	Nine-pin bowling	(Poland) 2020 Nine-pin Bowling Single's World Championships	International	Postponed; new dates TBA
21–6 June	Association football	(Estonia) 2020 UEFA European Under-17 Championship	Continental	Postponed; new dates TBA
21–24	Golf	(United States) Senior PGA Championship	International	Postponed; new dates TBA
22–24	Basketball	(Germany) 2020 EuroLeague Final Four	Continental	Cancelled mid-season due to the COVID-19 pandemic
23–26	Rallying	2020 Rally de Portugal	International	Cancelled due to the COVID-19 pandemic
23–7 June	Bowls	(Australia) 2020 World Outdoor Bowls Championship	International	Postponed; new dates TBA
24	Formula One	2020 Monaco Grand Prix	International	Cancelled due to the COVID-19 pandemic
26–31	BMX racing	(United States) 2020 UCI BMX World Championships	International	Postponed; new dates TBA
30	Triathlon	(Italy) 2020 ITU Triathlon World Cup #8	International	Men: (France) Vincent Luis Women: (Bermuda) Flora Duffy

=== June ===
Date	Sport	Venue/Event	Status	Winner/s
4–14	American football	(Hungary) 2020 World University American Football Championship	International	Postponed; new dates TBA
5–7	Rowing	(Poland) 2020 European Rowing Championships	Continental	Postponed; new dates TBA
6	Formula racing	(Indonesia) 2020 Jakarta ePrix	International	Cancelled due to the COVID-19 pandemic
6–7	Formula racing	(Azerbaijan) 2020 Baku FIA Formula 2 round	International	Cancelled due to the COVID-19 pandemic
6–7	Triathlon	(United Kingdom) 2020 ITU World Triathlon Series #4	International	Postponed; new dates TBA
7	Formula One	2020 Azerbaijan Grand Prix	International	Cancelled due to the COVID-19 pandemic
12–12 July	Association football	(European Union) UEFA Euro 2020	Continental	Postponed to 11 June–11 July 2021
12–12 July	Association football	(Argentina) / (Colombia) 2020 Copa América	Continental	Postponed to 11 June–11 July 2021
14	Formula One	(Canada) 2020 Canadian Grand Prix	International	Cancelled due to the COVID-19 pandemic
15–21	Handball	(Poland) 2020 World University Handball Championship	International	Postponed; new dates TBA
17–20	Golf	(Chinese Taipei) 2020 World University Golf Championship	International	Postponed; new dates TBA
19–21	Judo	(Czech Republic) 2020 European Judo Championships	Continental	Postponed to November 8–10
20	Horse racing	(United States) 2020 Belmont Stakes (Triple Crown #1)	Domestic	Horse: (United States) Tiz the Law; Jockey: (Puerto Rico) Manny Franco; Trainer: (United States) Barclay Tagg
20–26	Snooker	(England) 2020 Tour Championship (Coral Series #3)	International	(Scotland) Stephen Maguire
21–28	Table tennis	(South Korea) 2020 World Team Table Tennis Championships	International	Postponed to September 27–October 4
23–27	Beach volleyball	(Spain) 2020 World University Beach Volleyball Championships	International	Cancelled due to the COVID-19 pandemic
25	Basketball	(United States) 2020 NBA draft	International	Postponed to 18 october 2020
25–28	Mountain bike racing	(Germany) 2020 UCI Mountain Bike World Championships (XCO & XCR)	International	Postponed; new dates TBA
25–28	Golf	(United States) U.S. Senior Open	International	Cancelled due to the COVID-19 pandemic
25–28	Golf	(United States) 2020 Women's PGA Championship	International	Postponed to 8-11 november 2020
25–28	Judo	(Morocco) 2020 African Judo Championships	Continental	Postponed; new dates TBA
26–27	Ice hockey	(Canada) 2020 NHL entry draft	International	Postponed; new dates TBA
27–28	Triathlon	(Hungary) 2020 World University Triathlon Championships	International	Cancelled due to the COVID-19 pandemic
27–28	Triathlon	(Canada) 2020 ITU World Triathlon Series #5	International	Postponed; new dates TBA
28	Formula One	(France) 2020 French Grand Prix	International	Cancelled due to the COVID-19 pandemic
29–12 July	Tennis	(United Kingdom) 2020 Wimbledon Championships (Grand Slam #3)	International	Cancelled due to the COVID-19 pandemic
30–4 July	Sailing	(Italy) 2020 World University Sailing Championships	International	Cancelled due to the COVID-19 pandemic

=== July ===
Date	Sport	Venue/Event	Status	Winner/s
2–5	Athletics	(Italy) 2020 European Athletics U18 Championships	Continental	Postponed to August 26–29, 2021
2–5	Triathlon	(Estonia) 2020 European Triathlon Championships	Continental	Postponed; new dates TBA
4	Horse racing	(United Kingdom) 2020 Epsom Derby	International	Horse: (Republic of Ireland) Serpentine; Jockey: (Republic of Ireland) Emmet McNamara; Trainer: (Republic of Ireland) Aidan O'Brien
4–5	Formula racing	(Austria) 2020 Spielberg Formula 2 round (F2 #1)	International	Feature race: (United Kingdom) Callum Ilott ( (United Kingdom) UNI-Virtuosi Racing); Sprint race: (Brazil) Felipe Drugovich ( (Netherlands) MP Motorsport)
4–5	Formula racing	(Austria) 2020 Spielberg Formula 3 round (F3 #1)	Continental	Race 1: (Australia) Oscar Piastri ( (Italy) Prema Racing); Race 2: (New Zealand) Liam Lawson ( (United Kingdom) Hitech Grand Prix)
4–12	Basketball	(Bulgaria) 2020 FIBA Under-17 Basketball World Cup	International	Postponed to August 15–23
5	Formula One	(Austria) 2020 Austrian Grand Prix (F1 #1)	International	(Finland) Valtteri Bottas ( (Germany) Mercedes)
7–11	Modern pentathlon	(Portugal) 2020 World University Modern Pentathlon Championships	International	Cancelled
7–12	Athletics	(Kenya) 2020 World Athletics U20 Championships	International	Postponed to 17–22 August 2021
7–12	Canoeing	(Slovenia) 2020 World Junior and U23 Canoe Slalom Championships	International	Postponed; new dates TBA
9–12	Golf	(United States) Constellation Senior Players Championship	International	Postponed to August 12–16
9–12	Golf	(United States) U.S. Senior Women's Open	International	Cancelled
9–18	Lacrosse	(Republic of Ireland) 2020 Men's U19 World Lacrosse Championship	International	Postponed to 2021
10–12	Canoeing	(Hungary) 2020 Canoe Sprint Non-Olympic Events World Championships	International	Postponed, new dates TBA
11–12	Triathlon	(Germany) 2020 ITU World Triathlon Series #6	International	Postponed, new dates TBA
11–12	Formula racing	(Austria) 2020 2nd Spielberg Formula 2 round (F2 #2)	International	Feature race: (Russia) Robert Shwartzman ( (Italy) Prema Racing); Sprint race: (Denmark) Christian Lundgaard ( (France) ART Grand Prix)
11–12	Formula racing	(Austria) 2020 2nd Spielberg Formula 3 round (F3 #2)	Continental	Race 1: (Denmark) Frederik Vesti ( (Italy) Prema Racing); Race 2: (France) Théo Pourchaire ( (France) ART Grand Prix)
12	Formula One	(Austria) 2020 Styrian Grand Prix (F1 #2)	International	(United Kingdom) Lewis Hamilton ( (Germany) Mercedes)
14	Baseball	(United States) 2020 Major League Baseball All-Star Game	Domestic	Cancelled due to the COVID-19 pandemic
10–19	Table tennis	(Croatia) 2020 European Youth Table Tennis Championships	Continental	Postponed; new dates TBA
16–19	Golf	(United Kingdom) 2020 Open Championship	International	Cancelled due to the COVID-19 pandemic
16–19	Rallying	(Kenya) 2020 Safari Rally	International	Cancelled due to the COVID-19 pandemic
18–19	Formula racing	(Hungary) 2020 Hungaroring FIA Formula 2 round (F2 #3)	International	Feature race: (Russia) Robert Shwartzman ( (Italy) Prema Racing); Sprint race: (Italy) Luca Ghiotto ( (United Kingdom) Hitech Grand Prix)
18–19	Formula racing	(Hungary) 2020 Budapest Formula 3 round (F3 #3)	Continental	Race 1: (France) Théo Pourchaire ( (France) ART Grand Prix); Race 2: (Germany) David Beckmann ( (Italy) Trident)
18–19	Triathlon	(Hungary) 2020 ITU Triathlon World Cup #9	International	Postponed, new dates TBA
18–26	Darts	(England) 2020 World Matchplay	International	(Belgium) Dimitri Van den Bergh
19	Formula One	(Hungary) 2020 Hungarian Grand Prix (F1 #3)	International	(United Kingdom) Lewis Hamilton ( (Germany) Mercedes)
19	Motorcycle racing	(Spain) 2020 Spanish motorcycle Grand Prix (MotoGP #2)	International	MotoGP: (France) Fabio Quartararo ( (Malaysia) Petronas Yamaha SRT); Moto2: (Italy) Luca Marini ( (Italy) SKY Racing Team VR46); Moto3: (Spain) Albert Arenas ( (Spain) Aspar Team); MotoE: (Brazil) Eric Granado ( (Spain) Avintia Esponsorama Racing)
19–1 August	Association football	(Northern Ireland) 2020 UEFA European Under-19 Championship	Continental	Postponed; new dates TBA
23–26	Golf	(France) 2020 Evian Championship	International	Postponed to August 6–9
24–9 August	Multi-sport	(Japan) 2020 Summer Olympics	International	Postponed to 23 July–8 August 2021
25	Professional boxing	(United Kingdom) Anthony Joshua vs. Kubrat Pulev	International	Postponed from 20 June 2020
26	Motorcycle racing	(Andalusia) 2020 Andalusian motorcycle Grand Prix (MotoGP #3)	International	MotoGP: (France) Fabio Quartararo ( (Malaysia) Petronas Yamaha SRT); Moto2: (Italy) Enea Bastianini ( (Italy) Italtrans Racing Team); Moto3: (Japan) Tatsuki Suzuki ( (Italy) SIC58 Squadra Corse); MotoE: (Switzerland) Dominique Aegerter ( (Germany) Dynavolt Intact GP)
30–2 August	Golf	(United States) 2020 WGC-FedEx St. Jude Invitational	International	(United States) Justin Thomas
30–14 August	Basketball	(United States) / (Canada) 2019–20 NBA season	Domestic	Resumed after suspension
31–16 August	Snooker	(England) 2020 World Snooker Championship (Triple Crown #3)	International	(England) Ronnie O'Sullivan

=== August ===
Date	Sport	Venue/Event	Status	Winner/s
1–2	Formula racing	(United Kingdom) 2020 Silverstone Formula 2 round (F2 #4)	International	Feature race: (Russia) Nikita Mazepin ( (United Kingdom) Hitech Grand Prix); Sprint race: (United Kingdom) Dan Ticktum ( (France) DAMS)
1–2	Formula racing	(United Kingdom) 2020 Silverstone Formula 3 round (F3 #4)	Continental	Race 1: (New Zealand) Liam Lawson ( (United Kingdom) Hitech Grand Prix); Race 2: (Germany) David Beckmann ( (Italy) Trident)
2	Formula One	(United Kingdom) 2020 British Grand Prix (F1 #4)	International	(United Kingdom) Lewis Hamilton ( (Germany) Mercedes)
5–13	Formula racing	(Germany) 2020 Berlin ePrix (FE #6–#11)	International	Race 1: (Portugal) António Félix da Costa ( (China) DS Techeetah); Race 2: (Portugal) António Félix da Costa ( (China) DS Techeetah); Race 3: (Germany) Maximilian Günther ( (United States) BMW i Andretti Motorsport); Race 4: (France) Jean-Éric Vergne ( (China) DS Techeetah); Race 5: (United Kingdom) Oliver Rowland ( (France) Nissan e.dams); Race 6: (Belgium) Stoffel Vandoorne ( (Germany) Mercedes-Benz EQ Formula E Team)
5–16	Futsal	(Turkmenistan) 2020 AFC Futsal Championship	Continental	Postponed to 4–15 November 2020
6–9	Golf	(United States) 2020 PGA Championship	International	(United States) Collin Morikawa
6–9	Rallying	2020 Rally Finland	International	Cancelled due to the COVID-19 pandemic
8	Road bicycle racing	(Italy) 2020 Milan–San Remo (Monument #1)	International	(Belgium) Wout van Aert ( (Netherlands) Team Jumbo–Visma)
8–9	Formula racing	(United Kingdom) 2020 2nd Silverstone Formula 2 round (F2 #5)	International	Feature race: (United Kingdom) Callum Ilott ( (United Kingdom) UNI-Virtuosi Racing); Sprint race: (Japan) Yuki Tsunoda ( (United Kingdom) Carlin)
8–9	Formula racing	(United Kingdom) 2020 2nd Silverstone Formula 3 round (F3 #5)	Continental	Race 1: (United States) Logan Sargeant ( (Italy) Prema Racing); Race 2: (Netherlands) Bent Viscaal ( (Netherlands) MP Motorsport)
9	Formula One	(United Kingdom) 70th Anniversary Grand Prix (F1 #5)	International	(Netherlands) Max Verstappen ( (Austria) Red Bull Racing)
9	Motorcycle racing	2020 Czech Republic motorcycle Grand Prix (MotoGP #4)	International	MotoGP: (South Africa) Brad Binder ( (Austria) Red Bull KTM Factory Racing); Moto2: (Italy) Enea Bastianini ( (Italy) Italtrans Racing Team); Moto3: (Italy) Dennis Foggia ( (Luxembourg) Leopard Racing)
10–16	Tennis	(Canada) 2020 Canadian Open	International	Cancelled due to the COVID-19 pandemic
14–6 September	Road bicycle racing	(Spain) 2020 Vuelta a España (Grand Tour #3)	International	Postponed to 20 October - 8 November 2020
15	Endurance racing	(Belgium) 2020 6 Hours of Spa-Francorchamps (WEC #6)	International	LMP1: (United Kingdom) Mike Conway & (Japan) Kamui Kobayashi & (Argentina) José María López ( (Japan) Toyota Gazoo Racing); LMP2: (Portugal) Filipe Albuquerque & (United Kingdom) Philip Hanson & (United Kingdom) Paul di Resta ( (United Kingdom) United Autosports); LMGTE Pro: (Denmark) Michael Christensen & (France) Kévin Estre ( (Germany) Porsche GT Team); LMGTE Am: (France) Emmanuel Collard & (Denmark) Nicklas Nielsen & (France) François Perrodo ( (Italy) AF Corse)
15	Road bicycle racing	(Italy) 2020 Il Lombardia (Monument #2)	International	(Denmark) Jakob Fuglsang ( (Kazakhstan) Astana Pro Team)
15–23	Basketball	(Romania) 2020 FIBA Under-17 Women's Basketball World Cup	International	Postponed; new dates TBA
15–23	Badminton	(Denmark) 2020 Thomas & Uber Cup	International	Postponed to 3–11 October 2020
16–23	Rowing	(Slovenia) 2020 World Rowing Championships; (Slovenia) 2020 World Rowing Junior Championships; (Slovenia) 2020 World Rowing Under 23 Championships	International	Cancelled due to the COVID-19 pandemic
15–16	Formula racing	(Spain) 2020 Barcelona Formula 2 round (F2 #6)	International	Feature race: (Japan) Nobuharu Matsushita ( (Netherlands) MP Motorsport); Sprint race: (Brazil) Felipe Drugovich ( (Netherlands) MP Motorsport)
15–16	Formula racing	(Spain) 2020 Barcelona Formula 3 round (F3 #6)	Continental	Race 1: (United Kingdom) Jake Hughes ( (Germany) HWA Racelab); Race 2: (Australia) Oscar Piastri ( (Italy) Prema Racing)
16	Formula One	(Spain) 2020 Spanish Grand Prix (F1 #6)	International	(United Kingdom) Lewis Hamilton ( (Germany) Mercedes)
16	Motorcycle racing	(Austria) 2020 Austrian motorcycle Grand Prix (MotoGP #5)	International	MotoGP: (Italy) Andrea Dovizioso ( (Italy) Ducati Team); Moto2: (Spain) Jorge Martín ( (Finland) Red Bull KTM Ajo); Moto3: (Spain) Albert Arenas ( (Spain) Aspar Team)
17–23	Wrestling	(Hungary) 2020 World Cadet Wrestling Championships	International	Postponed; new dates TBA
17–30	Aquatic sports	(Hungary) 2020 European Aquatics Championships	Continental	Postponed to 10–23 May 2021
18–23	Water skiing	(United States) 2020 IWWF World Junior Waterski Championships	International	Postponed to 22–29 August 2021
20–23	Golf	(Scotland) 2020 Women's British Open	International	(Germany) Sophia Popov
20–23	Triathlon	(Canada) 2020 ITU World Triathlon Series #7 (Grand Final)	International	Postponed to 17–22 August 2021
20–30	Baseball	(United States) 2020 Little League World Series	International	Cancelled due to COVID-19 pandemic
20–7 September	Golf	(United States) 2020 FedEx Cup Playoffs	International	The Northern Trust: (United States) Dustin Johnson; BMW Championship: (Spain) Jon Rahm; Tour Championship: (United States) Dustin Johnson
21	Association football	(Germany) 2020 UEFA Europa League Final	Continental	(Spain) Sevilla
21–23	Canoeing	(Belarus) 2020 World University Canoeing Championships	International	Cancelled due to COVID-19 pandemic
22–23	Rallycross	2020 World RX of Sweden (WRX #1 #2)	International	Race 1: (Sweden) Johan Kristoffersson ( (Sweden) Volkswagen Dealerteam BAUHAUS); Race 2: (Sweden) Mattias Ekström ( (Sweden) KYB Team JC)
22–29	Tennis	(United States) 2020 Cincinnati Masters (Note: This event was held in New York City instead of Cincinnati, United States to limit the travel of players.)	International	Men: (Serbia) Novak Djokovic; Women: (Belarus) Victoria Azarenka
22–30	Volleyball	(Bosnia and Herzegovina) / (Croatia) 2020 Women's U19 Volleyball European Championship	Continental	Turkey
23	Association football	(Portugal) 2020 UEFA Champions League Final	Continental	(Germany) Bayern Munich
23	IndyCar	(United States) 2020 Indianapolis 500	International	(Japan) Takuma Sato
23	Motorcycle racing	(Styria) 2020 Styrian motorcycle Grand Prix (MotoGP #6)	International	MotoGP: (Portugal) Miguel Oliveira ( (France) Red Bull KTM Tech3); Moto2: (Italy) Marco Bezzecchi ( (Italy) Sky Racing Team VR46); Moto3: (Italy) Celestino Vietti ( (Italy) SKY Racing Team VR46)
24–28	Road bicycle racing	(France) 2020 European Road Championships	Continental	Netherlands
25	Association football	(Switzerland) 2020 UEFA Youth League Final	Continental	(Spain) Real Madrid
26–30	Athletics	(France) 2020 European Athletics Championships	Continental	Cancelled due to the COVID-19 pandemic
27–29	Rowing	(Croatia) 2020 World University Rowing Championships	International	Cancelled due to the COVID-19 pandemic
27–30	Golf	(England) 2020 International Crown	International	Cancelled due to the COVID-19 pandemic
29–30	Formula racing	(Belgium) 2020 Spa-Francorchamps Formula 2 round (F2 #7)	International	Feature Race: (Japan) Yuki Tsunoda ( (United Kingdom) Carlin); Sprint Race: (Russia) Robert Shwartzman ( (Italy) Prema Racing)
29–30	Formula racing	(Belgium) 2020 Spa-Francorchamps Formula 3 round (F3 #7)	Continental	Race 1: (Germany) Lirim Zendeli ( (Italy) Trident Racing); Race 2: (United States) Logan Sargeant ( (Italy) Prema Racing)
29–30	Rallycross	World RX of Finland (WRX #3 #4)	International	Race 1: (Sweden) Johan Kristoffersson ( (Sweden) Volkswagen Dealerteam BAUHAUS); Race 2: (Finland) Niclas Grönholm ( (Finland) GRX Taneco)
29–30	Triathlon	(Czech Republic) 2020 ITU Triathlon World Cup #10	International	Men: (France) Vincent Luis; Women: (Bermuda) Flora Duffy
29–20 September	Road bicycle racing	2020 Tour de France (Grand Tour #1)	International	(Slovenia) Tadej Pogačar ( (United Arab Emirates) UAE Team Emirates)
30	Association football	(Spain) 2020 UEFA Women's Champions League Final	Continental	(France) Lyon
30	Formula One	(Belgium) 2020 Belgian Grand Prix (F1 #7)	International	(United Kingdom) Lewis Hamilton ( (Germany) Mercedes)
31–13 September	Tennis	(United States) 2020 U.S. Open (Grand Slam #4)	International	Men: (Austria) Dominic Thiem; Women: (Japan) Naomi Osaka

=== September ===
Date	Sport	Venue/Event	Status	Winner/s
3–6	Rallying	2020 Rally New Zealand	International	Cancelled due to the COVID-19 pandemic
4–6	Rallying	2020 Rally Estonia (WRC #4)	International	WRC: (Estonia) Ott Tänak & (Estonia) Martin Järveoja ( (South Korea) Hyundai Shell Mobis WRT); WRC-2: (Norway) Mads Østberg & (Norway) Torstein Eriksen ( (France) PH-Sport); WRC-3: (Sweden) Oliver Solberg & (Republic of Ireland) Aaron Johnston; J-WRC: (Latvia) Mārtiņš Sesks & (Latvia) Renars Francis ( (Latvia) LMT Autosporta Akadēmija)
5	Horse racing	(United States) 2020 Kentucky Derby (Triple Crown #2)	International	Horse: (United States) Authentic; Jockey: (Puerto Rico) John Velazquez; Trainer: (United States) Bob Baffert
5–6	Formula racing	(Italy) 2020 Monza Formula 2 round (F2 #8)	International	Feature race: (Germany) Mick Schumacher ( (Italy) Prema Racing); Sprint race: (United Kingdom) Callum Ilott ( (United Kingdom) UNI-Virtuosi Racing)
5–6	Formula racing	(Italy) 2020 Monza Formula 3 round (F3 #8)	Continental	Race 1: (Denmark) Frederik Vesti ( (Italy) Prema Racing); Race 2: (United Kingdom) Jake Hughes ( (Germany) HWA Racelab)
5–6	Mountain bike racing	(Austria) 2020 UCI Mountain Bike World Championships (DHI only)	International	Postponed to 5–11 October 2020
5–6	Rowing	(Germany) 2020 European Rowing U23 Championships	Continental	Italy
5–6	Triathlon	(Germany) 2020 ITU Triathlon World Championships (Germany) 2020 ITU Triathlon Mixed Relay World Championships	International	Men: (France) Vincent Luis; Women: (United Kingdom) Georgia Taylor-Brown; Mixed Relay: France (Léonie Périault, Léo Bergere, Cassandre Beaugrand and Dorian Coninx)
5–12 December	American football	(United States) 2020 NCAA Division I FBS football season	Domestic	Alabama Crimson Tide
5–13	Volleyball	(Italy) 2020 Boys' U18 Volleyball European Championship	Continental	Italy
6	Formula One	(Italy) 2020 Italian Grand Prix (F1 #8)	International	(France) Pierre Gasly ( (Italy) AlphaTauri)
7–13	Wrestling	(Serbia) 2020 World Junior Wrestling Championships	International	Postponed to 4–10 December 2020
9–13	Shooting sports	(Czech Republic) 2020 World University Shooting Championships	International	Cancelled due to the COVID-19 pandemic
10–11	Mountain bike racing	(Italy) 2020 UCI Mountain Bike World Championships (4X only)	International	Cancelled due to the COVID-19 pandemic
10–13	Golf	(United States) 2020 ANA Inspiration	International	(South Korea) Mirim Lee
10–13	Golf	(England) 2020 BMW PGA Championship	International	Postponed to 8–11 October 2020
10–3 January 2021	American football	(United States) 2020 NFL season	Domestic	Kansas City Chiefs
11–19	Road bicycle racing	(Italy) 2020 Giro Rosa	International	(Netherlands) Anna van der Breggen ( (Netherlands) Boels–Dolmans)
11–20	Baseball	(Mexico) 2020 Women's Baseball World Cup	International	Postponed to 12–21 November 2020
12–13	Triathlon	(China) 2020 ITU Triathlon World Cup #11	International	Cancelled due to the COVID-19 pandemic
12–13	Formula racing	(Italy) 2020 Mugello Formula 2 round (F2 #9)	International	Feature race: (Russia) Nikita Mazepin ( (United Kingdom) Hitech Grand Prix); Sprint race: (Denmark) Christian Lundgaard ( (France) ART Grand Prix)
12–13	Formula racing	(Italy) 2020 Mugello Formula 3 round (F3 #9)	Continental	Race 1: (Denmark) Frederik Vesti ( (Italy) Prema Racing); Race 2: (New Zealand) Liam Lawson ( (United Kingdom) Hitech Grand Prix)
12–4 October	Futsal	(Lithuania) 2020 FIFA Futsal World Cup	International	Postponed to 12 September – 3 October 2021
13	Formula One	(Italy) 2020 Tuscan Grand Prix (F1 #9)	International	(United Kingdom) Lewis Hamilton ( (Germany) Mercedes)
13	Motorcycle racing	2020 San Marino and Rimini's Coast motorcycle Grand Prix (MotoGP #7)	International	MotoGP: (Italy) Franco Morbidelli ( (Malaysia) Petronas Yamaha SRT); Moto2: (Italy) Luca Marini ( (Italy) SKY Racing Team VR46); Moto3: (United Kingdom) John McPhee ( (Malaysia) Petronas Sprinta Racing); MotoE: (Italy) Matteo Ferrari ( (Italy) Trentino Gresini MotoE)
14–21	Tennis	(Italy) 2020 Italian Open	International	Men: (Serbia) Novak Djokovic; Women: (Romania) Simona Halep
15–20	Beach volleyball	(Latvia) 2020 European Beach Volleyball Championship	Continental	Men: (Norway) Anders Mol / Christian Sørum; Women: (Switzerland) Joana Heidrich / Anouk Vergé-Dépré
15–20	Table tennis	(Poland) 2020 European Table Tennis Championships	Continental	Postponed; new dates TBA
16–3 October	Association football	(Bahrain) 2020 AFC U-16 Championship	Continental	Postponed to 25 November – 12 December 2020
17–19	Rugby sevens	(Argentina) 2020 World University Rugby Sevens Championships	International	Cancelled due to the COVID-19 pandemic
17–20	Golf	(United States) Regions Tradition	International	Cancelled due to the COVID-19 pandemic
17–20	Golf	(United States) 2020 U.S. Open (Grand Slam #2)	International	(United States) Bryson DeChambeau
18–20	Canoe slalom	(Czech Republic) 2020 European Canoe Slalom Championships	Continental	Czech Republic
18–20	Rallying	2020 Rally Turkey (WRC #5)	International	WRC: (United Kingdom) Elfyn Evans & (United Kingdom) Scott Martin ( (Japan) Toyota Gazoo Racing WRT); WRC-2: (Sweden) Pontus Tidemand & (Sweden) Patrik Barth ( (Germany) Toksport WRT); WRC-3: (Poland) Kajetan Kajetanowicz & (Poland) Maciej Szczepaniak
19–20	Endurance racing	(France) 2020 24 Hours of Le Mans (WEC #7)	International	LMP1: (Switzerland) Sébastien Buemi & (New Zealand) Brendon Hartley & (Japan) Kazuki Nakajima ( (Japan) Toyota Gazoo Racing); LMP2: (Portugal) Filipe Albuquerque & (United Kingdom) Philip Hanson & (United Kingdom) Paul di Resta ( (United Kingdom) United Autosports); LMGTE Pro: (United Kingdom) Alex Lynn & (Belgium) Maxime Martin & (United Kingdom) Harry Tincknell ( (United Kingdom) Aston Martin Racing); LMGTE Am: (United Kingdom) Jonathan Adam & (Republic of Ireland) Charlie Eastwood & (Turkey) Salih Yoluç ( (United Kingdom) TF Sport)
19–20	Rallycross	World RX of Riga - Latvia (WRX #5 #6)	International	Race 1: (Sweden) Johan Kristoffersson ( (Sweden) Volkswagen Dealerteam BAUHAUS); Race 2: (Sweden) Mattias Ekström ( (Sweden) KYB Team JC)
20	Formula One	2020 Singapore Grand Prix	International	Cancelled due to the COVID-19 pandemic
20	Motorcycle racing	(Emilia-Romagna) 2020 Emilia Romagna and Rimini's Coast motorcycle Grand Prix (MotoGP #8)	International	MotoGP: (Spain) Maverick Viñales ( (Japan) Monster Energy Yamaha MotoGP); Moto2: (Italy) Enea Bastianini ( (Italy) Italtrans Racing Team); Moto3: (Italy) Romano Fenati ( (Italy) Sterilgarda Max Racing Team); MotoE Race 1: (Switzerland) Dominique Aegerter ( (Germany) Dynavolt Intact GP); MotoE Race 2: (Italy) Matteo Ferrari ( (Italy) Trentino Gresini MotoE)
22–27	Water skiing & Wakeboarding	(Ukraine) 2020 World University Waterski & Wakeboard Championships	International	Cancelled due to COVID-19 pandemic
24	Association football	(Hungary) 2020 UEFA Super Cup	Continental	(Germany) Bayern Munich
24–27	Road bicycle racing	(Italy) 2020 UCI Road World Championships	International	Netherlands
25–27	Golf	(United States) 2020 Ryder Cup	International	Postponed to 24 September — 26 September 2021
26	Triathlon	(Spain) 2020 ITU Triathlon World Cup #12	International	Postponed to 7–8 November 2020
26–27	Formula racing	(Russia) 2020 Sochi Formula 2 round (F2 #11)	International	Feature race: (Germany) Mick Schumacher ( (Italy) Prema Racing); Sprint race: (China) Guanyu Zhou ( (United Kingdom) UNI-Virtuosi Racing)
26–27	Formula racing	(Russia) 2020 Sochi Formula 3 round (F3)	Continental	Cancelled due to the COVID-19 pandemic
26–27	Mountain bike racing	(Turkey) 2020 UCI Mountain Bike Marathon World Championships	International	Postponed to 24–25 October 2020
26–4 October	Volleyball	(Czech Republic) 2020 Men's U20 Volleyball European Championship	Continental	Russia
27	Formula One	(Russia) 2020 Russian Grand Prix (F1 #10)	International	(Finland) Valtteri Bottas ( (Germany) Mercedes)
27	Marathon	(Germany) 2020 Berlin Marathon (WMM #3)	International	Cancelled due to the COVID-19 pandemic
27	Motorcycle racing	(Catalonia) 2020 Catalan motorcycle Grand Prix (MotoGP #9)	International	MotoGP: (France) Fabio Quartararo ( (Malaysia) Petronas Yamaha SRT); Moto2: (Italy) Luca Marini ( (Italy) Sky Racing Team VR46); Moto3: (South Africa) Darryn Binder ( (France) CIP Green Power)
27–11 October	Tennis	(France) 2020 French Open (Grand Slam #2)	International	Men: (Spain) Rafael Nadal; Women: (Poland) Iga Świątek
28–3 October	Squash	(Egypt) 2020 Men's PSA World Tour Finals; (Egypt) 2020 Women's PSA World Tour Finals	International	Men: (Egypt) Marwan El Shorbagy; Women: (Egypt) Hania El Hammamy
29–4 October	Wrestling	(Greece) 2020 World Veterans Wrestling Championships	International	Cancelled due to the COVID-19 pandemic
29–28 October	Baseball	(United States) 2020 MLB Postseason	Domestic	(California) Los Angeles Dodgers
30–4 October	Basketball	(Greece) 2020 Basketball Champions League Final Eight	Continental	(Spain) San Pablo Burgos

=== October ===
Date	Sport	Venue/Event	Status	Winner/s
1–4	Canoe slalom	(Poland) 2020 European Junior and U23 Canoe Slalom Championships	Continental	Czech Republic
3	Horse racing	(United States) 2020 Preakness Stakes (Triple Crown #3)	Domestic	Horse: (United States) Swiss Skydiver; Jockey: (United States) Robby Albarado; Trainer: (United States) Kenneth McPeek
3–25	Road bicycle racing	(Italy) 2020 Giro d'Italia (Grand Tour #2)	International	(United Kingdom) Tao Geoghegan Hart ( (United Kingdom) Ineos Grenadiers)
4	Horse racing	(France) 2020 Prix de l'Arc de Triomphe	International	Horse: (France) Sottsass; Jockey: (Italy) Cristian Demuro; Trainer: (France) Jean-Claude Rouget
4	Marathon	(United Kingdom) 2020 London Marathon (WMM #4)	International	Men: (Ethiopia) Shura Kitata; Women: (Kenya) Brigid Kosgei
4	Road bicycle racing	(Belgium) 2020 Liège–Bastogne–Liège (Monument #3)	International	(Slovenia) Primož Roglič ( (Netherlands) Team Jumbo–Visma)
5–11	Mountain bike racing	(Austria) 2020 UCI Mountain Bike World Championships	International	France
6–12	Darts	(England) 2020 World Grand Prix	International	(Wales) Gerwyn Price
8–11	Golf	(England) 2020 BMW PGA Championship	International	(England) Tyrrell Hatton
8–11	Golf	(United States) 2020 Women's PGA Championship	International	(South Korea) Kim Sei-young
8–11	Rallying	(Italy) 2020 Rally Italia Sardegna (WRC #6)	International	WRC: (Spain) Dani Sordo & (Spain) Carlos del Barrio ( (South Korea) Hyundai Shell Mobis WRT); WRC-2: (Sweden) Pontus Tidemand & (Sweden) Patrik Barth ( (Germany) Toksport WRT); WRC-3: (Finland) Jari Huttunen & (Finland) Mikko Lukka; J-WRC: (Sweden) Tom Kristensson & (Sweden) Joakim Sjöberg ( (Sweden) Tom Kristensson Motorsport)
8–13	Track cycling	(Italy) 2020 UEC European Track Championships (under-23 & junior)	Continental	Germany
9–11	Rowing	(Poland) 2020 European Rowing Championships	Continental	Netherlands
10–15	Boxing	(Poland) 2020 World University Boxing Championships	International	Cancelled due to the COVID-19 pandemic
11	Formula One	(Japan) 2020 Japanese Grand Prix (F1)	International	Cancelled due to the COVID-19 pandemic
11	Formula One	(Germany) 2020 Eifel Grand Prix (F1 #11)	International	(United Kingdom) Lewis Hamilton ( (Germany) Mercedes)
11	Marathon	(United States) 2020 Chicago Marathon (WMM #5)	International	Cancelled due to the COVID-19 pandemic
11	Motorcycle racing	(France) 2020 French motorcycle Grand Prix (MotoGP #10)	International	MotoGP: (Italy) Danilo Petrucci ( (Italy) Ducati Team); Moto2: (United Kingdom) Sam Lowes ( (Belgium) EG 0,0 Marc VDS); Moto3: (Italy) Celestino Vietti ( (Italy) SKY Racing Team VR46); MotoE Race 1: (Spain) Jordi Torres ( (Spain) Pons Racing 40); MotoE Race 2: (Finland) Niki Tuuli ( (Finland) Avant Ajo MotoE)
12–18	Tennis	(China) 2020 Shanghai Masters	International	Cancelled due to the COVID-19 pandemic
14–18	Taekwondo	(Bulgaria) 2020 World Junior Taekwondo Championships	International	Cancelled due to the COVID-19 pandemic
14–31	Association football	(Uzbekistan) 2020 AFC U-19 Championship	Continental	Postponed until early 2021
15–18	Rallying	(Germany) 2020 Rallye Deutschland	International	Cancelled due to the COVID-19 pandemic
15–18	Mountain bike racing	(Switzerland) 2020 European Mountain Bike Championships (XCE, XCO, & XCR)	Continental	France
16–18	Table tennis	(Germany) 2020 ITTF Men's World Cup	International	Postponed to 13–15 November 2020
17	Marathon	(Poland) 2020 World Athletics Half Marathon Championships	International	Men: (Uganda) Jacob Kiplimo; Women: (Kenya) Peres Jepchirchir
17	Professional boxing	(United States) Vasiliy Lomachenko vs. Teófimo López	International	(United States) Teófimo López
17	Rugby union	(England) 2020 European Rugby Champions Cup Final	Continental	(England) Exeter Chiefs
17	Speedway	(Poland) 2020 Speedway of Nations	International	Russia
17	Triathlon	(United States) 2020 Ironman World Championship	International	Cancelled due to the COVID-19 pandemic
17–18	Rallycross	(Spain) World RX of Catalunya - Barcelona (WRX #7 #8)	International	Race 1: (Sweden) Timmy Hansen ( (Sweden) Team Hansen); Race 2: (Sweden) Johan Kristoffersson ( (Sweden) Volkswagen Dealerteam BAUHAUS)
17–18	Triathlon	(South Korea) 2020 ITU Triathlon World Cup #13	International	Cancelled due to the COVID-19 pandemic
18	Motorcycle racing	2020 Aragon motorcycle Grand Prix (MotoGP #11)	International	MotoGP: (Spain) Álex Rins ( (Japan) Team Suzuki Ecstar); Moto2: (United Kingdom) Sam Lowes ( (Belgium) EG 0,0 Marc VDS); Moto3: (Spain) Jaume Masiá ( (Luxembourg) Leopard Racing)
18	Road bicycle racing	(Belgium) 2020 Tour of Flanders (Monument #4)	International	(Netherlands) Mathieu van der Poel ( (Belgium) Alpecin–Fenix)
18–15 November	Cricket	(Australia) 2020 ICC T20 World Cup	International	Postponed; new date TBA
20–24	Weightlifting	(South Korea) 2020 World University Weightlifting Championships	International	Cancelled due to the COVID-19 pandemic
20–28	Baseball	(United States) 2020 World Series	Domestic	(California) Los Angeles Dodgers (MVP: (North Carolina) Corey Seager)
20–8 November	Road bicycle racing	(Spain) 2020 Vuelta a España (Grand Tour #3)	International	(Slovenia) Primož Roglič ( (Netherlands) Team Jumbo–Visma)
23–25	Table tennis	(Thailand) 2020 ITTF Women's World Cup	International	Postponed to 8–10 November 2020
24–25	Triathlon	(Japan) 2020 ITU Triathlon World Cup #14	International	Cancelled due to the COVID-19 pandemic
25	Formula One	2020 United States Grand Prix (F1)	International	Cancelled due to the COVID-19 pandemic
25	Formula One	(Portugal) 2020 Portuguese Grand Prix (F1 #12)	International	(United Kingdom) Lewis Hamilton ( (Germany) Mercedes)
25	Motorcycle racing	(Province of Teruel) 2020 Teruel motorcycle Grand Prix (MotoGP #12)	International	MotoGP: (Italy) Franco Morbidelli ( (Malaysia) Petronas Yamaha SRT); Moto2: (United Kingdom) Sam Lowes ( (Belgium) EG 0,0 Marc VDS); Moto3: (Spain) Jaume Masiá ( (Luxembourg) Leopard Racing)
25	Road bicycle racing	(France) 2020 Paris–Roubaix (Monument #5)	International	Cancelled due to the COVID-19 pandemic
26–2 November	Tennis	(China) 2020 WTA Finals	International	Cancelled due to the COVID-19 pandemic
27–1 November	Tennis	(China) 2020 WTA Elite Trophy	International	Cancelled due to the COVID-19 pandemic
29–1 November	Darts	(Germany) 2020 European Championship	International	(Scotland) Peter Wright
29–1 November	Rallying	(United Kingdom) 2020 Wales Rally GB	International	Cancelled due to the COVID-19 pandemic
31–5 December	Rugby union	(Australia) 2020 Tri Nations Series	International	New Zealand

=== November ===
Date	Sport	Venue/Event	Status	Winner/s
1	Formula One	2020 Mexico City Grand Prix (F1)	International	Cancelled due to the COVID-19 pandemic
1	Formula One	(Italy) 2020 Emilia Romagna Grand Prix (F1 #13)	International	(United Kingdom) Lewis Hamilton ( (Germany) Mercedes)
1	Marathon	(United States) 2020 New York City Marathon (WMM #6)	International	Cancelled due to the COVID-19 pandemic
2–8	Snooker	(England) 2020 Champion of Champions	International	(Northern Ireland) Mark Allen
2–8	Tennis	(France) 2020 Paris Masters	International	(Russia) Daniil Medvedev
2–21	Association football	(India) 2020 FIFA U-17 Women's World Cup	International	Postponed to 17 February – 7 March 2021
3	Horse racing	(Australia) 2020 Melbourne Cup	International	Horse: (Republic of Ireland) Twilight Payment; Jockey: (Australia) Jye McNeil; Trainer: (Republic of Ireland) Joseph O'Brien
5–8	Karate	(Brazil) 2020 World University Karate Championships	International	Cancelled due to the COVID-19 pandemic
6–7	Horse racing	(United States) 2020 Breeders' Cup	International	Breeders' Cup Classic: Horse: (United States) Authentic; Jockey: (Puerto Rico) John Velazquez; Trainer: (United States) Bob Baffert
6–8	Darts	(Austria) 2020 PDC World Cup of Darts	International	Wales (Gerwyn Price & Jonny Clayton)
8	Motorcycle racing	(Europe) 2020 European motorcycle Grand Prix (MotoGP #13)	International	MotoGP: (Spain) Joan Mir ( (Japan) Team Suzuki Ecstar); Moto2: (Italy) Marco Bezzecchi ( (Italy) SKY Racing Team VR46); Moto3: (Spain) Raúl Fernández ( (Finland) Red Bull KTM Ajo)
8–10	Table tennis	(China) 2020 ITTF Women's World Cup	International	(China) Chen Meng
10–14	Tennis	(Italy) 2020 Next Generation ATP Finals	International	Cancelled due to the COVID-19 pandemic
11–15	Track cycling	(Bulgaria) 2020 UEC European Track Championships	Continental	Great Britain
11–18	Weightlifting	(Peru) 2020 IWF World Youth Weightlifting Championships	International	Cancelled due to the COVID-19 pandemic
12–15	Golf	(United States) 2020 Masters Tournament (Grand Slam #1)	International	(United States) Dustin Johnson
12–21	Baseball	(Mexico) 2020 Women's Baseball World Cup	International	Postponed to 1–9 March 2021
13–15	Table tennis	(China) 2020 ITTF Men's World Cup	International	(China) Fan Zhendong
14	Endurance racing	2020 8 Hours of Bahrain (WEC #8)	International	LMP1: (United Kingdom) Mike Conway & (Japan) Kamui Kobayashi & (Argentina) José María López ( (Japan) Toyota Gazoo Racing); LMP2: (France) Gabriel Aubry & (United Kingdom) Will Stevens & (China) Ho-Pin Tung ( (China) Jackie Chan DC Racing); LMGTE Pro: (Denmark) Michael Christensen & (France) Kévin Estre ( (Germany) Porsche GT Team); LMGTE Am: (Germany) Jörg Bergmeister & (Norway) Egidio Perfetti & (Netherlands) Larry ten Voorde ( (Germany) Team Project 1)
15	Formula One	(Brazil) 2020 Brazilian Grand Prix (F1)	International	Cancelled due to the COVID-19 pandemic
15	Formula One	(Turkey) 2020 Turkish Grand Prix (F1 #14)	International	(United Kingdom) Lewis Hamilton ( (Germany) Mercedes)
15	Motorcycle racing	2020 Valencian Community motorcycle Grand Prix (MotoGP #14)	International	MotoGP: (Italy) Franco Morbidelli ( (Malaysia) Petronas Yamaha SRT); Moto2: (Spain) Jorge Martín ( (Finland) Red Bull KTM Ajo); Moto3: (Italy) Tony Arbolino ( (Italy) Rivacold Snipers Team)
15–22	Tennis	(United Kingdom) 2020 ATP Finals	International	Singles: (Russia) Daniil Medvedev; Doubles: (Netherlands) Wesley Koolhof / (Croatia) Nikola Mektić
16–22	Badminton	(Thailand) 2020 World University Badminton Championships	International	Cancelled due to the COVID-19 pandemic
16–24	Darts	(England) 2020 Grand Slam of Darts	International	(Portugal) José de Sousa
19–21	Judo	(Czech Republic) 2020 European Judo Championships	Continental	France
19–22	Rallying	2020 Rally Japan	International	Cancelled due to the COVID-19 pandemic
19–22	Rallying	(Belgium) 2020 Ypres Rally	International	Cancelled due to the COVID-19 pandemic
19–22	Table tennis	(China) 2020 ITTF Finals	International	Men: (China) Ma Long; Women: (China) Chen Meng
20–22	Judo	(Mexico) 2020 Pan American Judo Championships	Continental	Brazil
22	Motorcycle racing	(Portugal) 2020 Portuguese motorcycle Grand Prix (MotoGP #15)	International	MotoGP: (Portugal) Miguel Oliveira ( (France) Red Bull KTM Tech3); Moto2: (Australia) Remy Gardner ( (Malaysia) ONEXOX TKKR SAG Team); Moto3: (Spain) Raúl Fernández ( (Finland) Red Bull KTM Ajo)
23–29	Tennis	(Spain) 2020 Davis Cup Finals	International	Postponed to 22–28 November 2021
23–29	Wrestling	(Finland) 2020 World U23 Wrestling Championships	International	Postponed to 2021
23–6 December	Snooker	(England) 2020 UK Championship (Triple Crown #1)	International	(Australia) Neil Robertson
25–12 December	Association football	(Bahrain) 2020 AFC U-16 Championship	Continental	Postponed from 16 September – 3 October 2020
26–29	Judo	(Mongolia) 2020 Asian-Pacific Judo Championships	Continental	Postponed; new dates TBA
26–29	Rhythmic gymnastics	(Ukraine) 2020 Rhythmic Gymnastics European Championships	Continental	Israel
27	Association football	(Egypt) 2020 CAF Champions League Final	Continental	(Egypt) Al Ahly
27–29	Darts	(England) 2020 Players Championship Finals	International	(Netherlands) Michael van Gerwen
28–29	Formula racing	(United Arab Emirates) 2020 Yas Marina FIA Formula 2 round (F2 #12)	International	Cancelled due to the COVID-19 pandemic
29	Formula racing	2020 Bahrain FIA Formula 2 round (F2 #12)	International	Feature Race: (Brazil) Felipe Drugovich ( (Netherlands) MP Motorsport); Sprint Race: (Russia) Robert Shwartzman ( (Italy) Prema Racing)
29	Canadian football	(Canada) 108th Grey Cup	Domestic	Postponed to 21 November 2021 due to COVID-19 pandemic
29	Formula One	2020 Bahrain Grand Prix (F1 #15)	International	(United Kingdom) Lewis Hamilton ( (Germany) Mercedes)
29–6 December	Table tennis	(Portugal) 2020 World Junior Table Tennis Championships	International	Cancelled due to the COVID-19 pandemic

=== December ===
Date	Sport	Venue/Event	Status	Winner/s
2–12	Handball	(Cameroon) 2020 African Women's Handball Championship	Continental	Postponed to 11–20 June 2021
3–6	Rallying	(Italy) 2020 Rally Monza (WRC #7)	International	WRC: (France) Sébastien Ogier & (France) Julien Ingrassia ( (Japan) Toyota Gazoo Racing WRT); WRC-2: (Norway) Mads Østberg & (Norway) Torstein Eriksen ( (France) PH-Sport); WRC-3: (Norway) Andreas Mikkelsen & (Norway) Anders Jæger-Amland; J-WRC: (Sweden) Tom Kristensson & (Sweden) Joakim Sjöberg ( (Sweden) Tom Kristensson Motorsport)
3–20	Handball	(Denmark) 2020 European Women's Handball Championship	Continental	Norway
4–12	Floorball	(Finland) 2020 Men's World Floorball Championships	International	Postponed to 2021.
5 - 6	Formula racing	(Bahrain) 2020 Sakhir FIA Formula 2 round (F2 #12)	International	Feature race: (Japan) Yuki Tsunoda ( (United Kingdom) Carlin); Sprint race: (India) Jehan Daruvala ( (United Kingdom) Carlin)
6	Formula One	(Bahrain) 2020 Sakhir Grand Prix (F1 #16)	International	(Mexico) Sergio Pérez ( (United Kingdom) Racing Point)
9–13	Artistic gymnastics	(Turkey) 2020 European Men's Artistic Gymnastics Championships	Continental	Ukraine
10–13	Ski flying	(Slovenia) FIS Ski Flying World Championships 2020	International	Individual: (Germany) Karl Geiger; Team: Norway
10–14	Golf	(United States) 2020 U.S. Women's Open	International	(South Korea) Kim A-lim
12	Professional boxing	(United Kingdom) Anthony Joshua vs. Kubrat Pulev	International	(United Kingdom) Anthony Joshua
12–18	Wrestling	(Serbia) 2020 Individual Wrestling World Cup	International	Russia
13	Athletics	(Republic of Ireland) 2020 European Cross Country Championships	Continental	Cancelled due to the COVID-19 pandemic
13	Formula One	(United Arab Emirates) 2020 Abu Dhabi Grand Prix (F1 #17)	International	(Netherlands) Max Verstappen ( (Austria) Red Bull Racing)
15–3 January 2021	Darts	(England) 2021 PDC World Darts Championship	International	(Wales) Gerwyn Price
17–20	Artistic gymnastics	(Turkey) 2020 European Women's Artistic Gymnastics Championships	Continental	Romania
17–20	Golf	(United States) 2020 CME Group Tour Championship	International	(South Korea) Ko Jin-young
17–20	Judo	(Madagascar) 2020 African Judo Championships	Continental	Egypt
17–20	Sailing	(New Zealand) 2019–20 America's Cup World Series	International	Abandoned on final day, due to weather conditions.
19	Association football	(Qatar) 2020 AFC Champions League Final	Continental	(South Korea) Ulsan Hyundai
22	Association football	(United States) 2020 CONCACAF Champions League Final	Continental	(Mexico) Tigres UANL
25–5 January 2021	Ice hockey	(Canada) 2021 World Junior Ice Hockey Championships	International	United States
29–6 January 2021	Ski jumping	(Germany) / (Austria) 2020–21 Four Hills Tournament	International	(Poland) Kamil Stoch
