= 2020 ITTF World Tour =

Details
- Duration: 28 January – 8 March 2020
- Edition: 25th
- Tournaments: 3
- Categories: World Tour Platinum (2); World Tour (1)

Achievements (singles)
- Most titles: Men: (China) Fan Zhendong (1) (Japan) Tomokazu Harimoto (1) (China) Xu Xin (1); Women: (China) Chen Meng (2)

The 2020 ITTF World Tour was the 25th season of the International Table Tennis Federation's professional table tennis world tour.

The season was cut short due to the COVID-19 pandemic, with only three events having taken place. The ITTF World Tour Grand Finals were replaced by the 2020 ITTF Finals, a one-off event featuring the top-ranked male and female players, as part of the International Table Tennis Federation's #RESTART series of events in November 2020.

== Points allocation ==
World Tour Platinum			World Tour	
x	MS/WS	MD/WD/XD	MS/WS	MD/WD/XD
Winner	500	300	250	200
Finalist	300	150	125	100
Semifinalists	200	75	63	50
Quarterfinalists	100	38	31	25
Round of 16	50	19	16	13
Round of 32	25		8	

== Schedule ==
The tournaments in the 2020 tour were split into two tiers: World Tour Platinum and World Tour. The Platinum events offered higher prize money and more points towards the ITTF World Tour standings, which would have determined the qualifiers for the ITTF World Tour Grand Finals in December.

Below is the 2020 schedule announced by the International Table Tennis Federation:

Key

Grand Finals
World Tour Platinum
World Tour

No.	Date	Tournament	Location	Venue	Prize (USD)	Report	Ref.
1	28 January – 2 February	(Germany) German Open	Magdeburg	GETEC Arena	270,000	Report	
2	18–23 February	(Hungary) Hungarian Open	Budapest	Budapest Olympic Hall	125,000	Report	
3	3–8 March	Qatar Open	Doha	Aspire Dome	400,000	Report	
4	~~21–26 April~~ (cancelled)	~~Japan Open~~	~~Kitakyushu~~				
5	~~5–10 May~~ (cancelled)	~~Hong Kong Open~~	~~Hong Kong~~				
6	12–17 May (postponed)	China Open	Shenzhen				
7	~~16–21 June~~ (cancelled)	(South Korea) ~~Korea Open~~	~~Busan~~				
8	~~23–28 June~~ (cancelled)	(Australia) ~~Australian Open~~	~~Geelong~~				
9	~~25–30 August~~ (cancelled)	(Czech Republic) ~~Czech Open~~	~~Olomouc~~				
10	~~1–6 September~~ (cancelled)	~~Bulgaria Open~~	~~Panagyurishte~~				
11	~~3–8 November~~ (cancelled)	(Sweden) ~~Swedish Open~~	~~Stockholm~~				
12	~~10–15 November~~ (cancelled)	(Austria) ~~Austrian Open~~	~~Linz~~				
13	~~10–13 December~~ (cancelled)	~~Grand Finals~~	Replaced by the 2020 ITTF Finals.				

== Results ==
Date	Tournament	Champions	Runners-up
28 January – 2 February	German Open: Location: Magdeburg, Germany; Venue: GETEC Arena; Category: World Tour Platinum; Prize: $270,000; Draws: 32MS/32WS/16MD/16WD/16XD	(China) Xu Xin	(China) Ma Long
28 January – 2 February	German Open: Location: Magdeburg, Germany; Venue: GETEC Arena; Category: World Tour Platinum; Prize: $270,000; Draws: 32MS/32WS/16MD/16WD/16XD	Score: 4–0 (15–13, 11–8, 11–7, 11–5)	
28 January – 2 February	German Open: Location: Magdeburg, Germany; Venue: GETEC Arena; Category: World Tour Platinum; Prize: $270,000; Draws: 32MS/32WS/16MD/16WD/16XD	(China) Chen Meng	(China) Ding Ning
28 January – 2 February	German Open: Location: Magdeburg, Germany; Venue: GETEC Arena; Category: World Tour Platinum; Prize: $270,000; Draws: 32MS/32WS/16MD/16WD/16XD	Score: 4–1 (3–11, 11–1, 11–7, 11–3, 11–1)	
28 January – 2 February	German Open: Location: Magdeburg, Germany; Venue: GETEC Arena; Category: World Tour Platinum; Prize: $270,000; Draws: 32MS/32WS/16MD/16WD/16XD	(South Korea) Cho Dae-seong (South Korea) Jang Woo-jin	(China) Lin Gaoyuan (China) Ma Long
28 January – 2 February	German Open: Location: Magdeburg, Germany; Venue: GETEC Arena; Category: World Tour Platinum; Prize: $270,000; Draws: 32MS/32WS/16MD/16WD/16XD	Score: 3–2 (10–12, 15–13, 12–14, 14–12, 11–6)	
28 January – 2 February	German Open: Location: Magdeburg, Germany; Venue: GETEC Arena; Category: World Tour Platinum; Prize: $270,000; Draws: 32MS/32WS/16MD/16WD/16XD	(China) Chen Meng (China) Wang Manyu	(Japan) Miu Hirano (Japan) Kasumi Ishikawa
28 January – 2 February	German Open: Location: Magdeburg, Germany; Venue: GETEC Arena; Category: World Tour Platinum; Prize: $270,000; Draws: 32MS/32WS/16MD/16WD/16XD	Score: 3–1 (11–7, 8–11, 11–7, 11–8)	
28 January – 2 February	German Open: Location: Magdeburg, Germany; Venue: GETEC Arena; Category: World Tour Platinum; Prize: $270,000; Draws: 32MS/32WS/16MD/16WD/16XD	(China) Xu Xin (China) Liu Shiwen	(Japan) Jun Mizutani (Japan) Mima Ito
28 January – 2 February	German Open: Location: Magdeburg, Germany; Venue: GETEC Arena; Category: World Tour Platinum; Prize: $270,000; Draws: 32MS/32WS/16MD/16WD/16XD	Score: 3–1 (12–10, 13–11, 7–11, 11–7)	
18–23 February	Hungarian Open: Location: Budapest, Hungary; Venue: Budapest Olympic Hall; Category: World Tour; Prize: $170,000; Draws: 32MS/32WS/16MD/16WD/16XD	(Japan) Tomokazu Harimoto	(Japan) Yukiya Uda
18–23 February	Hungarian Open: Location: Budapest, Hungary; Venue: Budapest Olympic Hall; Category: World Tour; Prize: $170,000; Draws: 32MS/32WS/16MD/16WD/16XD	Score: 4–1 (7–11, 11–8, 11–2, 11–6, 11–9)	
18–23 February	Hungarian Open: Location: Budapest, Hungary; Venue: Budapest Olympic Hall; Category: World Tour; Prize: $170,000; Draws: 32MS/32WS/16MD/16WD/16XD	(Japan) Mima Ito	(Chinese Taipei) Cheng I-ching
18–23 February	Hungarian Open: Location: Budapest, Hungary; Venue: Budapest Olympic Hall; Category: World Tour; Prize: $170,000; Draws: 32MS/32WS/16MD/16WD/16XD	Score: 4–3 (11–7, 1–11, 11–6, 7–11, 2–11, 11–9, 11–7)	
18–23 February	Hungarian Open: Location: Budapest, Hungary; Venue: Budapest Olympic Hall; Category: World Tour; Prize: $170,000; Draws: 32MS/32WS/16MD/16WD/16XD	(Germany) Benedikt Duda (Germany) Patrick Franziska	(India) Sharath Kamal (India) Sathiyan Gnanasekaran
18–23 February	Hungarian Open: Location: Budapest, Hungary; Venue: Budapest Olympic Hall; Category: World Tour; Prize: $170,000; Draws: 32MS/32WS/16MD/16WD/16XD	Score: 3–1 (11–5, 11–9, 8–11, 11–9)	
18–23 February	Hungarian Open: Location: Budapest, Hungary; Venue: Budapest Olympic Hall; Category: World Tour; Prize: $170,000; Draws: 32MS/32WS/16MD/16WD/16XD	(Japan) Miu Hirano (Japan) Kasumi Ishikawa	(Hong Kong) Doo Hoi Kem (Hong Kong) Lee Ho Ching
18–23 February	Hungarian Open: Location: Budapest, Hungary; Venue: Budapest Olympic Hall; Category: World Tour; Prize: $170,000; Draws: 32MS/32WS/16MD/16WD/16XD	Score: 3–0 (11–6, 11–9, 12–10)	
18–23 February	Hungarian Open: Location: Budapest, Hungary; Venue: Budapest Olympic Hall; Category: World Tour; Prize: $170,000; Draws: 32MS/32WS/16MD/16WD/16XD	(Hong Kong) Wong Chun Ting (Hong Kong) Doo Hoi Kem	(Germany) Patrick Franziska (Germany) Petrissa Solja
18–23 February	Hungarian Open: Location: Budapest, Hungary; Venue: Budapest Olympic Hall; Category: World Tour; Prize: $170,000; Draws: 32MS/32WS/16MD/16WD/16XD	Score: 3–2 (11–6, 6–11, 12–9, 7–11, 11–9)	
3–8 March	Qatar Open: Location: Doha, Qatar; Venue: Aspire Dome; Category: World Tour Platinum; Prize: $400,000; Draws: 32MS/32WS/16MD/16WD/16XD	(China) Fan Zhendong	(England) Liam Pitchford
3–8 March	Qatar Open: Location: Doha, Qatar; Venue: Aspire Dome; Category: World Tour Platinum; Prize: $400,000; Draws: 32MS/32WS/16MD/16WD/16XD	Score: 4–2 (11–9, 11–7, 8–11, 11–4, 6–11, 11–7)	
3–8 March	Qatar Open: Location: Doha, Qatar; Venue: Aspire Dome; Category: World Tour Platinum; Prize: $400,000; Draws: 32MS/32WS/16MD/16WD/16XD	(China) Chen Meng	(Japan) Mima Ito
3–8 March	Qatar Open: Location: Doha, Qatar; Venue: Aspire Dome; Category: World Tour Platinum; Prize: $400,000; Draws: 32MS/32WS/16MD/16WD/16XD	Score: 4–1 (3–11, 11–7, 11–9, 11–7, 11–7)	
3–8 March	Qatar Open: Location: Doha, Qatar; Venue: Aspire Dome; Category: World Tour Platinum; Prize: $400,000; Draws: 32MS/32WS/16MD/16WD/16XD	(China) Ma Long (China) Xu Xin	(England) Paul Drinkhall (England) Liam Pitchford
3–8 March	Qatar Open: Location: Doha, Qatar; Venue: Aspire Dome; Category: World Tour Platinum; Prize: $400,000; Draws: 32MS/32WS/16MD/16WD/16XD	Score: 3–1 (11–8, 8–11, 11–1, 11–6)	
3–8 March	Qatar Open: Location: Doha, Qatar; Venue: Aspire Dome; Category: World Tour Platinum; Prize: $400,000; Draws: 32MS/32WS/16MD/16WD/16XD	(China) Wang Manyu (China) Zhu Yuling	(Japan) Miyuu Kihara (Japan) Miyu Nagasaki
3–8 March	Qatar Open: Location: Doha, Qatar; Venue: Aspire Dome; Category: World Tour Platinum; Prize: $400,000; Draws: 32MS/32WS/16MD/16WD/16XD	Score: 3–1 (11–4, 7–11, 11–8, 11–9)	
3–8 March	Qatar Open: Location: Doha, Qatar; Venue: Aspire Dome; Category: World Tour Platinum; Prize: $400,000; Draws: 32MS/32WS/16MD/16WD/16XD	(Japan) Jun Mizutani (Japan) Mima Ito	(China) Wang Chuqin (China) Sun Yingsha
3–8 March	Qatar Open: Location: Doha, Qatar; Venue: Aspire Dome; Category: World Tour Platinum; Prize: $400,000; Draws: 32MS/32WS/16MD/16WD/16XD	Score: 3–1 (11–8, 7–11, 11–4, 15–13)	

== Grand Finals ==
The 2020 ITTF World Tour Grand Finals were cancelled due to the COVID-19 pandemic. They were replaced by the 2020 ITTF Finals, an event featuring the highest-ranked male and female players, which took place in Zhengzhou, China, from 19 to 22 November 2020.

== See also ==
- 2020 World Team Table Tennis Championships
- 2020 ITTF Men's World Cup
- 2020 ITTF Women's World Cup
- 2020 ITTF Challenge Series
