= 2020 ITTF Finals =

Bank of Communications 2020 ITTF Finals
Tournament details
- Dates: 19–22 November 2020
- Competitors: 32 from 14 nations
- Total prize money: US$500,000
- Venue: Zhengzhou Olympic Sports Center
- Location: Zhengzhou, China

Champions
- Men's singles: (China) Ma Long
- Women's singles: (China) Chen Meng

The 2020 ITTF Finals, also referred to as the Bank of Communications 2020 ITTF Finals for sponsorship reasons, was a table tennis tournament that took place from 19 to 22 November 2020 in Zhengzhou, China. The tournament was organised by the International Table Tennis Federation as a one-off replacement for the ITTF World Tour Grand Finals, which was cancelled in 2020 due to the impact of the COVID-19 pandemic on sports.

After series of cancellation of tournaments this year, the 2020 ITTF Finals is one of the three year-end tournaments that conclude the table tennis calendar in 2020. The other two, the 2020 ITTF World Cup and the inaugural World Table Tennis Macao, were also held in November in China.

== Events ==
Event	Gold	Silver	Bronze
Men's singles	(China) Ma Long	(China) Fan Zhendong	(South Korea) Jang Woo-jin
Men's singles	(China) Ma Long	(China) Fan Zhendong	(China) Xu Xin
Women's singles	(China) Chen Meng	(China) Wang Manyu	(China) Sun Yingsha
Women's singles	(China) Chen Meng	(China) Wang Manyu	(Japan) Mima Ito

== Qualification ==
The top 16 players in the April 2020 ITTF World Ranking were invited to compete in men's and women's singles events, subject to a maximum of four players from each national association. Players were seeded according to their November 2020 World Ranking.

== Men's singles ==
=== Players ===
1. (China) Fan Zhendong (final)
2. (China) Xu Xin (semifinals)
3. (China) Ma Long (champion)
4. (Japan) Tomokazu Harimoto (first round)
5. (China) Lin Gaoyuan (quarterfinals)
6. (Brazil) Hugo Calderano (quarterfinals)
7. (Chinese Taipei) Lin Yun-ju (quarterfinals)
8. (Sweden) Mattias Falck (quarterfinals)
9. (Germany) Dimitrij Ovtcharov (first round)
10. (Japan) Koki Niwa (first round)
11. (South Korea) Jeoung Young-sik (first round)
12. (England) Liam Pitchford (first round)
13. (Germany) Patrick Franziska (first round)
14. (South Korea) Jang Woo-jin (semifinals)
15. (France) Simon Gauzy (first round)
16. (Nigeria) Quadri Aruna (first round)

=== Draw ===
First round
1	(China) Fan Zhendong	11	11	11	11
11	(South Korea) Jeoung Young-sik	6	2	5	7
12	(England) Liam Pitchford	4	4	11	10
6	(Brazil) Hugo Calderano	11	11	13	12
5	(China) Lin Gaoyuan	11	11	11	11
10	(Japan) Koki Niwa	9	3	4	9
14	(South Korea) Jang Woo-jin	6	2	11	7	12	11	11
4	(Japan) Tomokazu Harimoto	11	11	7	11	10	2	5
3	(China) Ma Long	12	11	11	11
13	(Germany) Patrick Franziska	10	1	6	4
15	(France) Simon Gauzy	4	9	11	11	12	6	7
8	(Sweden) Mattias Falck	11	11	5	7	10	11	11
7	(Chinese Taipei) Lin Yun-ju	8	11	4	11	11	12
9	(Germany) Dimitrij Ovtcharov	11	3	11	9	6	10
16	(Nigeria) Quadri Aruna	10	8	6	5
2	(China) Xu Xin	12	11	11	11

Quarterfinals
1	(China) Fan Zhendong	11	13	11	9	11
6	(Brazil) Hugo Calderano	6	11	7	11	9
5	(China) Lin Gaoyuan	7	12	11	7	10	11	6
14	(South Korea) Jang Woo-jin	11	10	1	11	12	8	11
3	(China) Ma Long	11	7	5	11	11	13
8	(Sweden) Mattias Falck	5	11	11	6	9	11
7	(Chinese Taipei) Lin Yun-ju	7	8	11	11	2	3
2	(China) Xu Xin	11	11	9	7	11	11

Semifinals
1	(China) Fan Zhendong	11	11	13	11	11
14	(South Korea) Jang Woo-jin	8	4	15	8	5
3	(China) Ma Long	11	11	11	11	11
2	(China) Xu Xin	13	9	9	8	7

Final
1	(China) Fan Zhendong	11	7	10	11	8
3	(China) Ma Long	13	11	12	9	11

== Women's singles ==
=== Players ===
1. (China) Chen Meng (champion)
2. (Japan) Mima Ito (semifinals)
3. (China) Sun Yingsha (semifinals)
4. (China) Wang Manyu (final)
5. (Chinese Taipei) Cheng I-ching (quarterfinals)
6. (Singapore) Feng Tianwei (first round)
7. (Japan) Kasumi Ishikawa (first round)
8. (China) Wang Yidi (quarterfinals)
9. (Austria) Sofia Polcanova (first round)
10. (Hong Kong) Doo Hoi Kem (first round)
11. (South Korea) Jeon Ji-hee (first round)
12. (Japan) Hitomi Sato (first round)
13. (Puerto Rico) Adriana Díaz (first round)
14. (Germany) Petrissa Solja (quarterfinals)
15. (Japan) Miyu Kato (first round)
16. (South Korea) Suh Hyo-won (quarterfinals)

=== Draw ===
First round
1	(China) Chen Meng	11	13	7	11	8	11
15	(Japan) Miyu Kato	6	11	11	6	11	4
14	(Germany) Petrissa Solja	11	8	9	11	11	11
6	(Singapore) Feng Tianwei	8	11	11	5	7	9
7	(Japan) Kasumi Ishikawa	8	11	9	5	5
16	(South Korea) Suh Hyo-won	11	3	11	11	11
11	(South Korea) Jeon Ji-hee	10	8	7	4
3	(China) Sun Yingsha	12	11	11	11
4	(China) Wang Manyu	11	16	11	11
12	(Japan) Hitomi Sato	6	14	5	9
13	(Puerto Rico) Adriana Díaz	11	4	10	5	11
5	(Chinese Taipei) Cheng I-ching	9	11	12	11	13
8	(China) Wang Yidi	11	14	11	11
9	(Austria) Sofia Polcanova	3	12	7	7
10	(Hong Kong) Doo Hoi Kem	11	11	6	5	6
2	(Japan) Mima Ito	13	6	11	11	11

Quarterfinals
1	(China) Chen Meng	9	10	11	11	11	11
14	(Germany) Petrissa Solja	11	12	5	5	8	6
16	(South Korea) Suh Hyo-won	12	6	11	3	11	5
3	(China) Sun Yingsha	10	11	8	11	13	11
4	(China) Wang Manyu	11	11	9	11	11
5	(Chinese Taipei) Cheng I-ching	7	7	11	6	6
8	(China) Wang Yidi	11	8	13	4	7	11	5
2	(Japan) Mima Ito	6	11	11	11	11	7	11

Semifinals
1	(China) Chen Meng	11	11	11	12
3	(China) Sun Yingsha	9	8	8	10
4	(China) Wang Manyu	11	11	11	11
2	(Japan) Mima Ito	3	4	9	6

Final
1	(China) Chen Meng	11	11	14	11	11
4	(China) Wang Manyu	9	13	12	8	5

== See also ==
- 2020 World Team Table Tennis Championships
- 2020 ITTF Men's World Cup
- 2020 ITTF Women's World Cup
- 2020 ITTF World Tour
