= 2020 ITTF World Cup =

2020 ITTF World Cup may refer to

- 2020 ITTF Men's World Cup
- 2020 ITTF Women's World Cup
