= 2020 ITTF Challenge Series =

Details
- Duration: 4 February – 5 December 2020
- Edition: 4th
- Tournaments: 13
- Categories: Challenge Plus (7); Challenge (6)

Achievements (singles)

The 2020 ITTF Challenge Series is the fourth season of the International Table Tennis Federation's secondary professional table tennis tour, a level below the ITTF World Tour. As in the previous season, the ITTF Challenge Series is split into two tiers: Challenge Plus and Challenge.

== Schedule ==
ITTF Challenge Series is divided into two tiers: Challenge Plus and Challenge.

Below is the 2020 schedule announced by the International Table Tennis Federation:

Key

Challenge Plus
Challenge

No.	Date	Tournament	Location	Venue	Prize (USD)	Report	Ref.
1	4–8 February	(Spain) Spanish Open	Granada	Palacio de Deportes de Granada	40,000	Report	
2	12–16 February	Portugal Open	Lisbon	Pavilhão Desportivo do Casal Vistoso	70,000	Report	
3	11–15 March	Oman Open	Muscat	Sultan Qaboos Sports Complex	70,000	Report	
4	11–15 March	(Poland) ~~Polish Open~~	Gliwice	Gliwice Arena	40,000	Report	
5	1–5 April	(Italy) ~~Italian Open~~	Riccione		40,000	Report	
6	22–26 April	~~Slovenia Open~~	Otočec		40,000	Report	
7	28 Apr.–2 May	~~Croatia Open~~	Zagreb		40,000	Report	
8	29 Apr.–3 May	~~Thailand Open~~	Bangkok		40,000	Report	
9	3–7 June	~~Belarus Open~~	Minsk		TBA	Report	
10	18–22 August	~~Nigeria Open~~	Lagos		TBA	Report	
11	9–13 September	(North Korea) ~~Pyongyang Open~~	Pyongyang		TBA	Report	
12	27–31 October	~~Belgium Open~~	De Haan		TBA	Report	
13	1–5 December	(Canada) ~~North American Open~~	Vancouver		TBA	Report	

== Winners ==
Key

Challenge Plus
Challenge

Event	Men's singles	Women's singles	Men's doubles	Women's doubles	Mixed doubles	U21 Men's singles	U21 Women's singles
(Spain) Spanish Open	(Kazakhstan) Kirill Gerassimenko	(Japan) Honoka Hashimoto	(Iran) Nima Alamian (Iran) Noshad Alamian	(Japan) Satsuki Odo (Japan) Saki Shibata	Not held	(Romania) Rareş Şipoş	(Japan) Maki Shiomi
Portugal Open	(Germany) Qiu Dang	(Japan) Kasumi Ishikawa	(Portugal) Diogo Carvalho (Portugal) Joao Geraldo	(Japan) Satsuki Odo (Japan) Saki Shibata	(France) Emmanuel Lebesson (France) Yuan Jia Nan	(Russia) Vladimir Sidorenko	(Japan) Maki Shiomi
Oman Open	(India) Sharath Kamal	(Japan) Hitomi Sato	(Serbia) Aleksandar Karakašević (Slovakia) Ľubomír Pištej	(Japan) Honoka Hashimoto (Japan) Hitomi Sato	(France) Tristan Flore (France) Laura Gasnier	(India) Jeet Chandra	(Japan) Maki Shiomi
(Poland) ~~Polish Open~~	Events cancelled due to COVID-19 pandemic						
(Italy) ~~Italian Open~~	Events cancelled due to COVID-19 pandemic						
~~Slovenia Open~~	Events cancelled due to COVID-19 pandemic						
~~Croatia Open~~	Events cancelled due to COVID-19 pandemic						
~~Thailand Open~~	Events cancelled due to COVID-19 pandemic						
~~Belarus Open~~	Events cancelled due to COVID-19 pandemic						
(Nigeria) ~~Nigerian Open~~	Events cancelled due to COVID-19 pandemic						
(North Korea) ~~Pyongyang Open~~	Events cancelled due to COVID-19 pandemic						
~~Belgium Open~~	Events cancelled due to COVID-19 pandemic						
(Canada) ~~North American Open~~	Events cancelled due to COVID-19 pandemic						

== See also ==
- 2020 World Table Tennis Championships
- 2020 ITTF World Tour
