= Mima Ito =

Japanese table tennis player (born 2000)

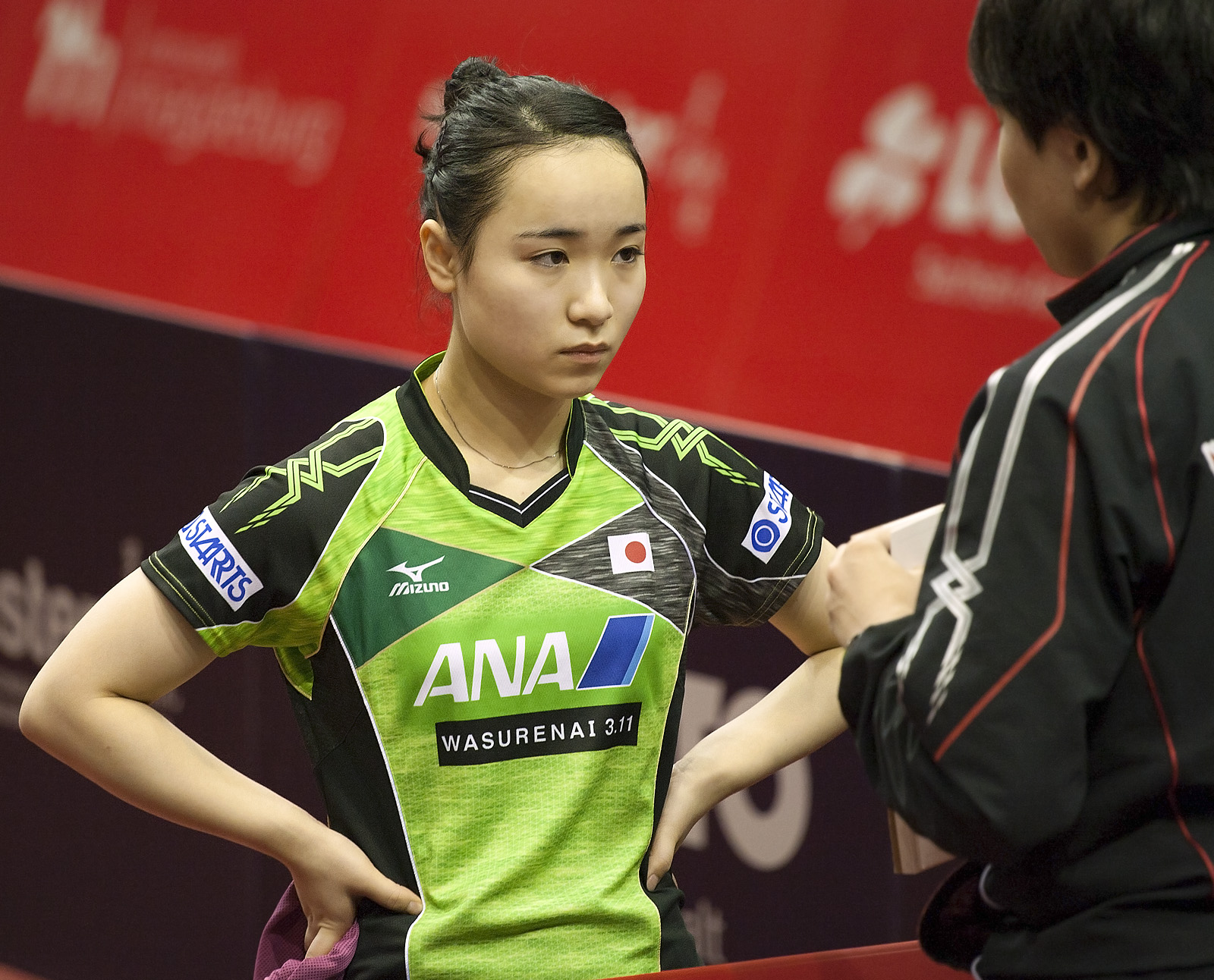
- Ito in 2017

Personal information
- Born: 21 October 2000 (age 25) Iwata, Shizuoka, Japan
- Height: 1.52 m (5 ft 0 in)
- Weight: 45 kg (99 lb)

Sport
- Sport: Table tennis
- Playing style: Right-handed, shakehand grip, counter driver
- Equipment: Nittaku Acoustic Carbon, Nittaku Moristo SP, Nittaku Fastarc G-1
- Highest ranking: 2 (April 2020)
- Current ranking: 24 (28 September 2026)
Medal record
Women's table tennis
Representing Japan
Event	1st	2nd	3rd
Olympic Games	1	1	2
World Championships	0	6	2
World Cup	0	3	2
Total	1	10	6
Olympic Games
Gold medal – first place	2020 Tokyo	Mixed doubles
Silver medal – second place	2020 Tokyo	Team
Bronze medal – third place	2016 Rio de Janeiro	Team
Bronze medal – third place	2020 Tokyo	Singles
World Championships
Silver medal – second place	2016 Kuala Lumpur	Team
Silver medal – second place	2018 Halmstad	Team
Silver medal – second place	2019 Budapest	Doubles
Silver medal – second place	2021 Houston	Doubles
Silver medal – second place	2022 Chengdu	Team
Silver medal – second place	2024 Busan	Team
Bronze medal – third place	2017 Düsseldorf	Doubles
Bronze medal – third place	2025 Doha	Singles
World Cup
Silver medal – second place	2018 London	Team
Silver medal – second place	2019 Tokyo	Team
Silver medal – second place	2025 Chengdu	Mixed team
Bronze medal – third place	2020 Weihai	Singles
Bronze medal – third place	2025 Macao	Singles
Asian Games
Silver medal – second place	2026 Aichi-Nagoya	Team
Asian Championships
Gold medal – first place	2024 Astana	Team
Silver medal – second place	2015 Pattaya	Doubles
Silver medal – second place	2015 Pattaya	Team
Silver medal – second place	2017 Wuxi	Mixed doubles
Silver medal – second place	2017 Wuxi	Team
Bronze medal – third place	2017 Wuxi	Doubles
Bronze medal – third place	2023 Pyeongchang	Team
Bronze medal – third place	2024 Astana	Singles
World Junior Championships
Gold medal – first place	2016 Cape Town	Team
Silver medal – second place	2012 Hyderabad	Team
Silver medal – second place	2013 Rabat	Team
Silver medal – second place	2014 Shanghai	Team
Silver medal – second place	2014 Shanghai	Doubles

Mima Ito (伊藤 美誠, Itō Mima; born 21 October 2000) is a Japanese table tennis player. She won a bronze medal in the Women's Team event at the 2016 Summer Olympics at age 15. At the 2020 Summer Olympics, she won the gold medal with her partner Jun Mizutani in the inaugural mixed doubles event, bronze in women's singles, and silver in the women's team event.

Often termed as the 'greatest threat' to Chinese table tennis dominance, Ito Mima has the highest winning rate against Chinese players in the history of women's table tennis. She has a winning record against several top Chinese players, including world champion Liu Shiwen, former world no. 1 Zhu Yuling, and world junior champion Qian Tianyi. Her signature playing style entails lethal shovel serves, fast short-pimpled backhand punches, and flat forehand smashes. In March 2020 at the Qatar Open, Ito Mima recorded a 4–0 win against reigning Olympic champion Ding Ning in the semifinals. Notably, she won the third set 11–0, the first time a non-Chinese player won a set 11–0 against a Chinese player.

== Career ==
=== Junior ===
At the age of ten, she became the youngest person to win a match at the Japanese senior table tennis championships and the youngest person to win an ITTF Junior Circuit tournament. At eleven she defeated the player ranked 50th in the world at the time. At the age of 14, she moved in June 2015 for the first time into the Top 10 in the world rankings before she was defeated by Han Ying and Chen Meng, reaching World Rank No. 9.

In March 2014, she, together with Miu Hirano, won the doubles' title at German Open. They were both 13 at the time. Thus they became the youngest-ever winners of a doubles competition in the ITTF World Tour.

In April 2014, she again won a double title with Miu Hirano, at the ITTF World Tour in Spain.

In December 2014, she won again the doubles with Miu Hirano at the ITTF World Tour Grand Finals in Bangkok against the Singaporean partnership Feng Tianwei and Yu Mengyu, and at that moment Miu Hirano and Mima Ito became the youngest players winning the ITTF World Tour Grand Finals. In March 2015, she won, after beating Shan Xiaona, Che Xiaoxi and Feng Tianwei, the singles' title at German Open against Petrissa Solja. On 5 July 2015, Mima Ito and Miu Hirano won the Women's Doubles title at the ITTF World Tour on the Korea Open in the city of Incheon.

In December 2015, the 2015 ITTF Star Awards, a Breakthrough Star Award presented by TMS International was given out to Japan's Mima Ito. At 14 years and 153 days old when she won the 2015 ITTF World Tour German Open singles title on Sunday 22 March she became the youngest player ever to win a women’s singles title either on the ITTF World Tour or at an ITTF Challenge Series tournament.

In September 2015, it was announced that she would be part of the Japanese national team at the 2016 Summer Olympics in Rio de Janeiro. At 15 years of age, she won the bronze medal for Japan, where she won the last and important game against Feng Tianwei (Ranked 4th in the world), with 3–0 in sets for the Japanese women's table tennis team with Ai Fukuhara and Kasumi Ishikawa. With her bronze medal in Rio, she broke another record for the youngest Olympic table tennis player to win a medal in the Women's Team category.

In 2017, she played for the Liaoning team in the second-tier Chinese league.

=== 2018 ===
In January 2018, she won the women's singles at the All Japan Championship for the first time by defeating Miu Hirano in the final. She also won women's doubles with Hina Hayata and the mixed doubles with Masataka Morizono and achieved a triple crown. The triple crown is the third in the history of the All Japan Table Tennis Championships after Kazuko Yamaizumi (1960) and Kasumi Ishikawa (2014), and she was the youngest to achieve this feat at the age of 17 years old. In February, at the Team World Cup, where a new method of playing doubles in the first game was introduced, she played mainly in doubles with Hina Hayata and won a silver medal. In May, in the 2018 World Team Table Tennis Championships, she defeated Jeon Ji-hee 3–0 in the semifinals and Liu Shiwen, who has won 37 consecutive victories against Japanese players, in the first match in the final. She won 3–2 against her. The Japanese team eventually lost to China 1–3 and won a silver medal, but Ito herself finished the tournament with eight wins and zero losses. In June, at the Japan Open, she beat Chen Xingtong in the women's singles semi-final after coming back from 0–3 deficit. She then went on to beat Wang Manyu in the final. In November 2018, she beat all the top Chinese players ranked higher than her: world no. 6 and Olympic Singles gold medalist Ding Ning, world no. 2 Liu Shiwen and world no. 1 Zhu Yuling at the 2018 Swedish Open, winning the tournament.

=== 2019–2020 ===
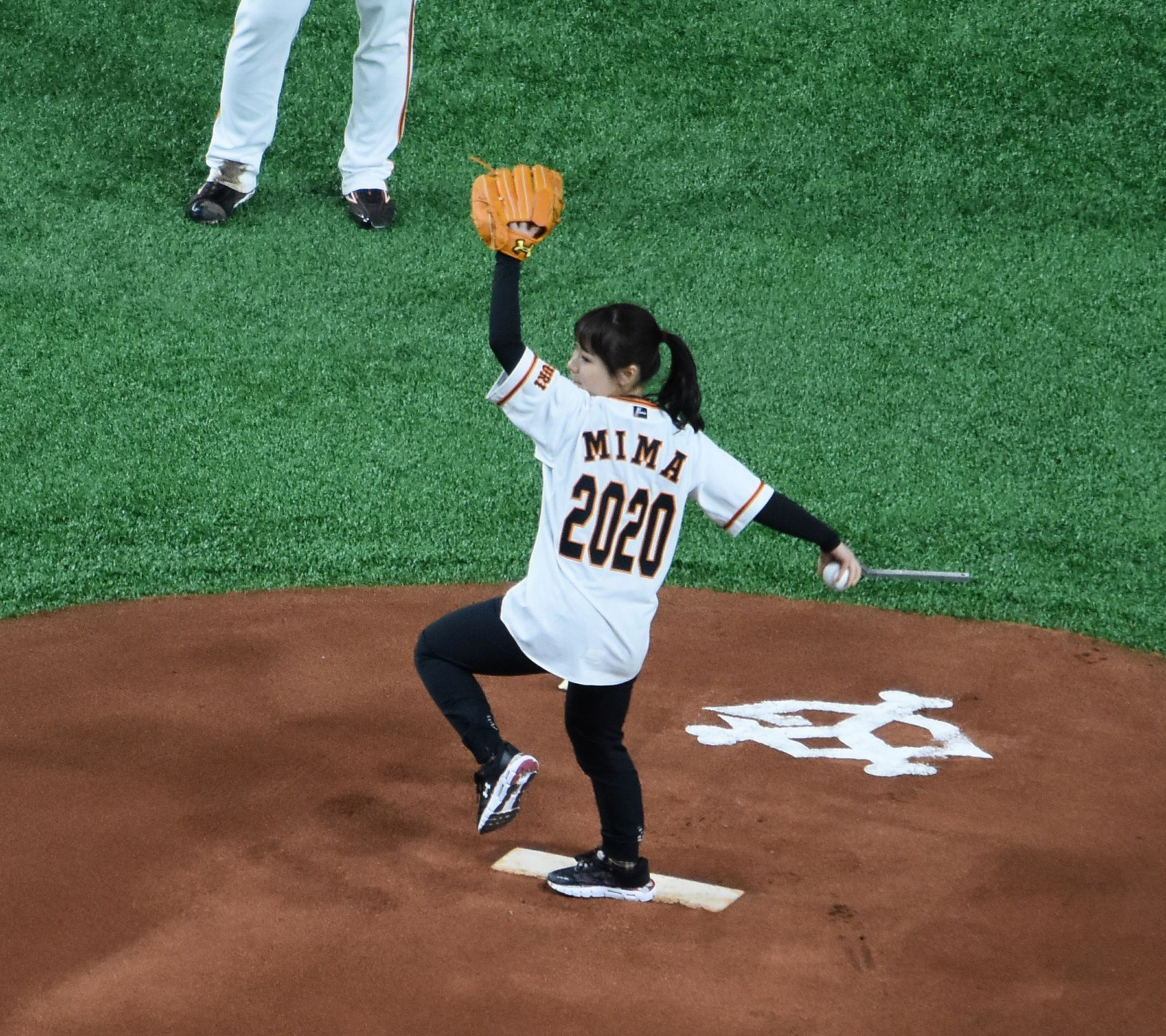
Mima Ito throwing the ceremonial first pitch, Yomiuri Giants vs. Hanshin Tigers, Tokyo Dome, 2 April 2019.

In November 2019, she beat world junior champion Qian Tianyi and Zhu Yuling to win the Austrian Open.

In January 2020, it was announced that Ito Mima would be part of the women's table tennis team for the 2020 Tokyo Olympics, together with Kasumi Ishikawa and Miu Hirano. Earlier on, she had been the first player to be selected to play in the Women's Singles event. In February, she won the Hungarian Open 2020, beating Taiwanese top player Cheng I-Ching 4–3.

In March 2020, Ito Mima and Jun Mizutani won the Mixed Doubles category at the Qatar Open, beating Chinese pair Sun Yingsha and Wang Chuqin 3–1 in the finals.

In November 2020, she won the bronze medal in the 2020 Women's World Cup, losing to Sun Yingsha in the semifinals, but beating Han Ying in the 3rd–4th place match. Also in November 2020, she won the bronze medal in the 2020 ITTF Finals, losing to Wang Manyu in the semifinals.

=== 2021 ===
In 2021, Ito reached the finals of the Japan National Championships before losing 4–3 to Kasumi Ishikawa. On the way to the finals, she avenged her 2020 loss to Hina Hayata. In March, Mima Ito won the WTT Contender Event at WTT Doha, again defeating Hina Hayata in the finals. She also won the ensuing WTT Star Contender event, defeating potential Olympic opponents Jeon Ji-hee in the semi-finals and Feng Tianwei in the finals, capping off an undefeated run at WTT Doha (albeit there were no Chinese players due to concerns about COVID-19). As a result of her performance at WTT Doha, Ito passed Sun Yingsha for number two in the world rankings. However, in April, ITTF amended the rules so that for the Tokyo Olympics, she would be seeded below Sun Yingsha.

In June, Ito's mixed doubles teammate Jun Mizutani stated that they had a 70–80% chance of winning a medal at the Tokyo Olympics and a 30% chance of winning gold. In an interview to Chinese media, Deng Yaping stated that Ito was not a serious threat to challenge China at the Tokyo Olympics. However, one week later, Liu Guoliang praised Japan and hinted that China was taking Japan as a serious threat in every event. In an interview in late June, Ito stated that she was ready to play even if the Olympics were to be held the next day, and that she was hoping to take home three gold medals in Tokyo.

Ito was paired with Jun Mizutani in the Mixed Doubles event which made its debut at the 2020 Summer Olympics. In the quarter-finals against Germany’s Patrick Franziska and Petrissa Solja, Ito and Jun advanced by prevailing in the seventh set 16–14 after saving seven match points. On 26 July 2021, Ito and Jun won the gold medal, becoming the first non-Chinese to win a gold in a table tennis event since 2004. Ito was praised for her aggressive play as critical in their comeback 4–3 finals win (after initially trailing 2–0) over the number one-ranked pair of China's Liu Shiwen and Xu Xin.

Mima Ito reached the women’s singles semi-finals of the Tokyo 2020 Olympics comfortably, beating Jeon Ji-hee 4–0 (building a 10–0 lead in one game before giving Jeon a mercy point) in the quarter-finals. However, in the semi-finals Mima Ito was crushed 4–0 by Sun Yingsha. She would go on to win bronze in the women's singles event. Ito stated that in regards to skill level, there was "a gulf in class" between China and Japan. “What I was doing was not bad, but the results showed that we are not even close", Ito said following her defeat to Sun Yingsha.

Ito later competed in the team event and made it to the final match against China on 5 August 2021. Her teammates Ishikawa and Hirano won the first game in the opening doubles however their lead was soon wiped out after Chen Meng and Wang Manyu had gained ground, winning 9–11, 11–6, 11–8, 11–7. Ito was unable to beat Sun Yingsha, going down 11–8, 11–5, 3–11, 11–3. Ito's team eventually lost the game after Wang beat Hirano 11–5, 11–9, 11–3 in the third match with the total score of 0–3 losing to China and consequently taking the Silver medal. After the game, Ito said "The last match is over and we enjoyed ourselves. Of course, we wanted to win and it stings to lose but it was fun."

== 2024 ==
She was left out of the national team for the Paris Olympics in favor of 15-year-old Miwa Harimoto (16 by the Games' start).

== 2025 ==
At the 2025 World Table Tennis Championships, she won a singles bronze medal.

== Playing style ==
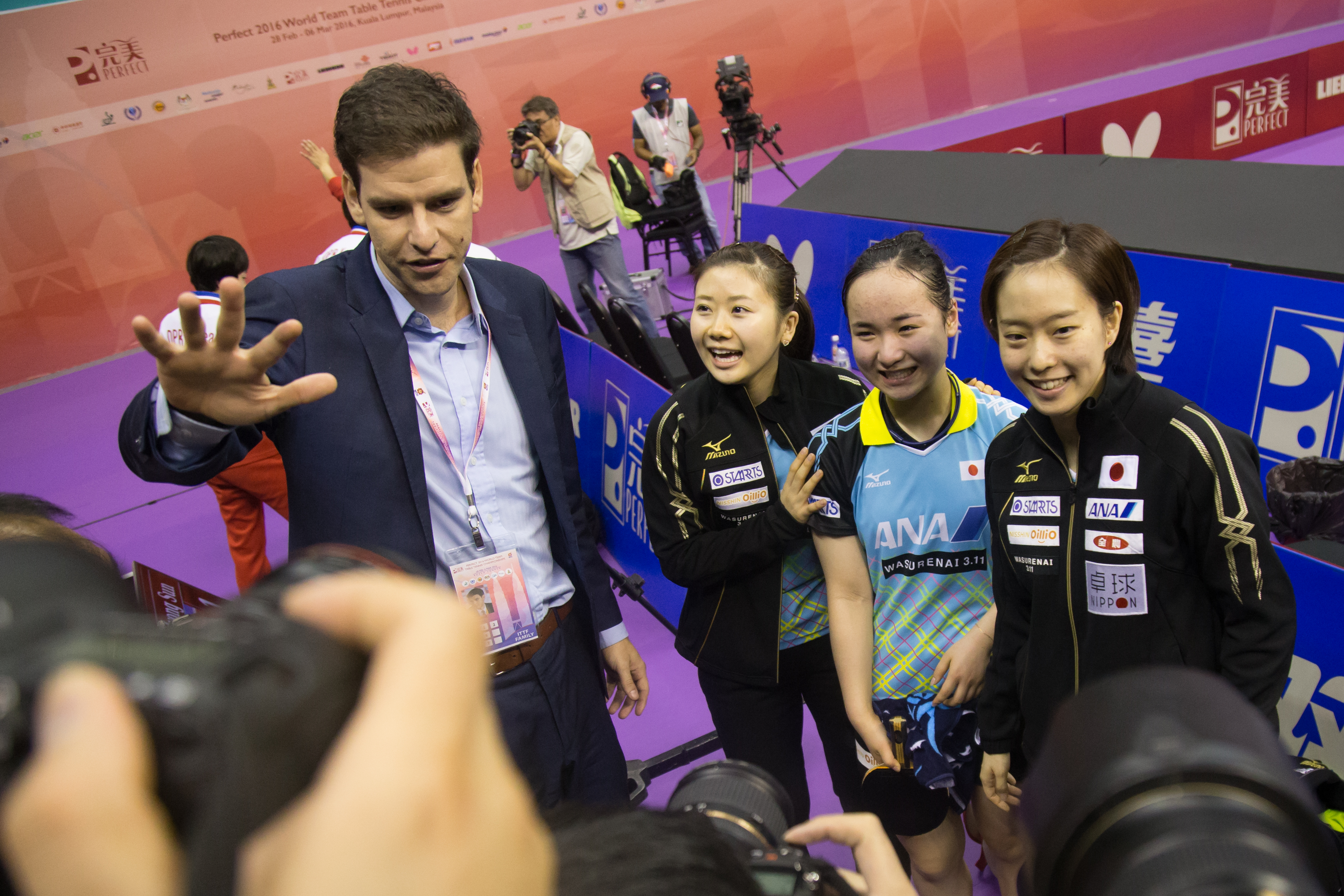
Mima Ito and other table tennis stars like Ai Fukuhara and Kasumi Ishikawa are consistently ranked among the country's most marketable athletes.

Ito has a unique and constantly innovating playing style characterized by short pips on her backhand, fast flat smashes on the forehand, and a unique serve. As a result of Ito's creative returns with the short pips against short serves, opponents tend to serve fast long serves more often against her, even if it means yielding the opening. In an essay in April 2021, Ito said that she felt her style was to finish the point in two or three shots.

Both Liu Guoliang and Deng Yaping have praised Ito for her creativity and willingness to experiment and innovate in-match. Deng Yaping also praised Ito's tendency to mount comebacks based on her willingness to take risks and swing at difficult shots when she is losing by a lot.

== Awards ==
- 2015: ITTF Breakthrough Star of the Year

== Singles titles ==
Year	Tournament	Final opponent	Score	Ref
2015	ITTF World Tour, German Open	(Germany) Petrissa Solja	4–2	
2015	ITTF World Tour, Belarus Open	(Japan) Misako Wakamiya	4–0	
2016	ITTF World Tour, Austrian Open	(Japan) Yui Hamamoto	4–2	
2017	ITTF World Tour, Czech Open	(Japan) Kasumi Ishikawa	4–1	
2017	ITTF Challenge, Polish Open	(Japan) Saki Shibata	4–1	
2018	ITTF World Tour, Japan Open	(China) Wang Manyu	4–2	
2018	ITTF World Tour, Swedish Open	(China) Zhu Yuling	4–0	
2019	ITTF World Tour Platinum, Austrian Open	(China) Zhu Yuling	4–1	
2020	ITTF World Tour, Hungarian Open	(Chinese Taipei) Cheng I-ching	4–3	
2021	WTT Contender Doha	(Japan) Hina Hayata	4–2	
2021	WTT Star Contender Doha	(Singapore) Feng Tianwei	4–1	
2022	WTT Contender Zagreb	(Japan) Miu Hirano	4–2	
2023	WTT Contender Amman	(Hong Kong) Doo Hoi Kem	4–0	
2024	WTT Star Contender Bangkok	(Japan) Honoka Hashimoto	4–2	

== In popular culture ==
Ito had a minor role in the 2017 film Mixed Doubles. In 2018, she appeared in the music video of Little Glee Monster's single "Sekai wa Anata ni Waraikakete Iru" (世界はあなたに笑いかけている; "The World Is Smiling at You".)
