= 2020 ITTF Men's World Cup =

Table tennis competition

- Location: Weihai, China
- Date: 13–15 November 2020
- Competitors: 21

Medalists
gold medal	(China) Fan Zhendong
silver medal	(China) Ma Long
bronze medal	(Japan) Tomokazu Harimoto

The 2020 ITTF Men's World Cup was a table tennis competition held in Weihai, China, from 13 to 15 November 2020. It was the 41st edition of the ITTF-sanctioned event. After series of cancellation of tournaments due to the impact of the COVID-19 pandemic on sports this year, the ITTF World Cup is one of the three year-end tournaments that conclude the table tennis calendar in 2020. The other two, 2020 ITTF Finals and the inaugural World Table Tennis Macao), were also all held in November in China.

== Competition format ==
The tournament consisted of two stages: a preliminary group stage and a knockout stage. The players seeded 9 to 21 were drawn into four groups. The top two players from each group then joined the top eight seeded players in the second stage of the competition, which consisted of a knockout draw.

== Seeding ==
The seeding list was based on the official ITTF world ranking for November 2020.

1. (China) Fan Zhendong (champion)
2. (China) Ma Long (final)
3. (Japan) Tomokazu Harimoto (semifinals)
4. (Brazil) Hugo Calderano (first round)
5. (Chinese Taipei) Lin Yun-ju (quarterfinals)
6. (Sweden) Mattias Falck (quarterfinals)
7. (Germany) Dimitrij Ovtcharov (quarterfinals)
8. (Japan) Koki Niwa (first round)
9. (South Korea) Jeoung Young-sik (quarterfinals)
10. (England) Liam Pitchford (first round)
11. (Germany) Patrick Franziska (first round)
12. (South Korea) Jang Woo-jin (semifinals)
13. (Nigeria) Quadri Aruna (preliminary round)
14. (Hong Kong) Wong Chun Ting (first round)
15. (United States) Kanak Jha (preliminary round)
16. (Austria) Robert Gardos (first round)
17. (Chinese Taipei) Chuang Chih-yuan (first round)
18. (Slovenia) Darko Jorgić (first round)
19. (Croatia) Tomislav Pucar (preliminary round)
20. (Brazil) Gustavo Tsuboi (preliminary round)
21. (Egypt) Ahmed Saleh (preliminary round)

== Preliminary stage ==
The preliminary group stage took place on 13 November, with the top two players in each group progressing to the main draw.

	Group A	(Hong Kong) Wong	(South Korea) Jeoung	(Croatia) Pucar	(Egypt) Saleh	Points
14	(Hong Kong) Wong Chun Ting		4–2	4–2	4–0	6
9	(South Korea) Jeoung Young-sik	2–4		4–0	4–0	5
19	(Croatia) Tomislav Pucar	2–4	0–4		4–2	4
21	(Egypt) Ahmed Saleh	0–4	0–4	2–4		3

	Group B	(England) Pitchford	(Chinese Taipei) Chuang	(United States) Jha	Points
10	(England) Liam Pitchford		4–1	4–3	4
17	(Chinese Taipei) Chuang Chih-yuan	1–4		4–3	3
15	(United States) Kanak Jha	3–4	3–4		2

	Group C	(Germany) Franziska	(Slovenia) Jorgić	(Nigeria) Aruna	Points
11	(Germany) Patrick Franziska		4–0	4–1	4
18	(Slovenia) Darko Jorgić	0–4		4–2	3
13	(Nigeria) Quadri Aruna	1–4	2–4		2

	Group D	(South Korea) Jang	(Austria) Gardos	(Brazil) Tsuboi	Points
12	(South Korea) Jang Woo-jin		4–2	4–0	4
16	(Austria) Robert Gardos	2–4		4–1	3
20	(Brazil) Gustavo Tsuboi	0–4	1–4		2

== Main draw ==
The knockout stage took place from 14–15 November.

First round
1	(China) Fan Zhendong	11	11	11	11
17	(Chinese Taipei) Chuang Chih-yuan	5	9	8	6
11	(Germany) Patrick Franziska	13	11	7	11	6	2
5	(Chinese Taipei) Lin Yun-ju	15	8	11	8	11	11
8	(Japan) Koki Niwa	13	4	14	11	9	7	10
12	(South Korea) Jang Woo-jin	11	11	12	8	11	11	12
9	(South Korea) Jeoung Young-sik	11	14	11	10	11	11
4	(Brazil) Hugo Calderano	8	16	9	12	2	7
3	(Japan) Tomokazu Harimoto	11	11	12	11
16	(Austria) Robert Gardos	3	7	10	8
14	(Hong Kong) Wong Chun Ting	11	7	12	12	6	13	15
6	(Sweden) Mattias Falck	8	11	14	10	11	11	17
7	(Germany) Dimitrij Ovtcharov	12	9	4	11	13	11	11
10	(England) Liam Pitchford	10	11	11	5	11	13	7
18	(Slovenia) Darko Jorgić	7	14	9	13	11	3
2	(China) Ma Long	11	12	11	11	13	11

Quarterfinals
1	(China) Fan Zhendong	12	9	11	11	7	11
5	(Chinese Taipei) Lin Yun-ju	10	11	2	5	11	5
12	(South Korea) Jang Woo-jin	15	11	2	11	7	11
9	(South Korea) Jeoung Young-sik	13	9	11	6	11	6
3	(Japan) Tomokazu Harimoto	11	11	11	4	11
6	(Sweden) Mattias Falck	9	8	9	11	9
7	(Germany) Dimitrij Ovtcharov	9	4	7	11	5
2	(China) Ma Long	11	11	11	7	11

Semifinals
1	(China) Fan Zhendong	11	11	13	11
12	(South Korea) Jang Woo-jin	5	8	11	8
3	(Japan) Tomokazu Harimoto	7	11	11	11	8	6	4
2	(China) Ma Long	11	3	6	8	11	11	11

Final
1	(China) Fan Zhendong	3	11	11	11	7	7	11
2	(China) Ma Long	11	8	3	6	11	11	9
Third place
12	(South Korea) Jang Woo-jin	11	11	9	6	12	11	5
3	(Japan) Tomokazu Harimoto	7	7	11	11	14	6	11

== See also ==
- 2020 World Team Table Tennis Championships
- 2020 ITTF World Tour
- 2020 ITTF Finals
- 2020 ITTF Women's World Cup
