= 2020 ITTF Women's World Cup =

Table tennis competition

- Location: Weihai, China
- Date: 8–10 November 2020
- Competitors: 21

Medalists
| gold medal | (China) Chen Meng |
| silver medal | (China) Sun Yingsha |
| bronze medal | (Japan) Mima Ito |

The 2020 ITTF Women's World Cup was a table tennis competition held in Weihai, China, from 8 to 10 November 2020. It was the 24th edition of the ITTF-sanctioned event. After series of cancellation of tournaments due to the impact of the COVID-19 pandemic on sports this year, the ITTF World Cup is one of the three year-end tournaments that conclude the table tennis calendar in 2020. The other two, 2020 ITTF Finals and the inaugural World Table Tennis Macao, were also all held in November in China.

== Qualification ==
In total, 21 players qualified for the World Cup:

- The current World Champion
- 18 players from the five Continental Cups held during 2020
- A wild card, selected by the ITTF

A maximum of two players from each association could qualify.

== Competition format ==
The tournament consisted of two stages: a preliminary group stage and a knockout stage. The players seeded 9 to 21 were drawn into four groups. The top two players from each group then joined the top eight seeded players in the second stage of the competition, which consisted of a knockout draw.

== Seeding ==
The seeding list was based on the official ITTF world ranking for November 2020.

1. (China) Chen Meng (champion)
2. (Japan) Mima Ito (semifinals)
3. (China) Sun Yingsha (final)
4. (Chinese Taipei) Cheng I-ching (quarterfinals)
5. (Singapore) Feng Tianwei (first round)
6. (Japan) Kasumi Ishikawa (quarterfinals)
7. (Austria) Sofia Polcanova (first round)
8. (Hong Kong) Doo Hoi Kem (first round)
9. (South Korea) Jeon Ji-hee (first round)
10. (Puerto Rico) Adriana Diaz (first round)
11. (Germany) Petrissa Solja (preliminary round)
12. (South Korea) Suh Hyo-won (first round)
13. (Romania) Bernadette Szőcs (first round)
14. (Germany) Han Ying (semifinals)
15. (Chinese Taipei) Chen Szu-yu (quarterfinals)
16. (United States) Lily Zhang (quarterfinals)
17. (Netherlands) Britt Eerland (preliminary round)
18. (United States) Wu Yue (first round)
19. (Egypt) Dina Meshref (preliminary round)
20. (Canada) Zhang Mo (preliminary round)
21. (Ukraine) Margaryta Pesotska (preliminary round)

== Preliminary stage ==
The preliminary group stage took place on 8 November, with the top two players in each group progressing to the main draw.

| | Group A | (Germany) Han | (South Korea) Jeon | (Netherlands) Eerland | Points |
| 14 | (Germany) Han Ying | | 4–0 | 4–0 | 4 |
| 9 | (South Korea) Jeon Ji-hee | 0–4 | | 4–3 | 3 |
| 17 | (Netherlands) Britt Eerland | 0–4 | 3–4 | | 2 |

| | Group B | (United States) Zhang L | (Puerto Rico) Diaz | (Ukraine) Pesotska | (Canada) Zhang M | Points |
| 16 | (United States) Lily Zhang | | 4–2 | 2–4 | 4–3 | 5 |
| 10 | (Puerto Rico) Adriana Diaz | 2–4 | | 4–2 | 4–1 | 5 |
| 21 | (Ukraine) Margaryta Pesotska | 4–2 | 2–4 | | 4–1 | 5 |
| 20 | (Canada) Zhang Mo | 3–4 | 1–4 | 1–4 | | 3 |

| | Group C | (Chinese Taipei) Chen | (United States) Wu | (Germany) Solja | Points |
| 15 | (Chinese Taipei) Chen Szu-yu | | 4–3 | 4–2 | 4 |
| 18 | (United States) Wu Yue | 3–4 | | 4–3 | 3 |
| 11 | (Germany) Petrissa Solja | 2–4 | 3–4 | | 2 |

| | Group D | (South Korea) Suh | (Romania) Szőcs | (Egypt) Meshref | Points |
| 12 | (South Korea) Suh Hyo-won | | 4–2 | 4–1 | 4 |
| 13 | (Romania) Bernadette Szőcs | 2–4 | | 4–3 | 3 |
| 19 | (Egypt) Dina Meshref | 1–4 | 3–4 | | 2 |

== Main draw ==
The knockout stage took place from 9–10 November.

First round
1 | (China) Chen Meng | 11 | 11 | 11 | 11
13 | (Romania) Bernadette Szőcs | 6 | 1 | 3 | 7
16 | (United States) Lily Zhang | 11 | 11 | 11 | 8 | 8 | 13
5 | (Singapore) Feng Tianwei | 7 | 8 | 9 | 11 | 11 | 11
7 | (Austria) Sofia Polcanova | 7 | 11 | 11 | 9 | 11 | 5 | 6
14 | (Germany) Han Ying | 11 | 9 | 5 | 11 | 8 | 11 | 11
18 | (United States) Wu Yue | 5 | 4 | 4 | 3
4 | (Chinese Taipei) Cheng I-ching | 11 | 11 | 11 | 11
3 | (China) Sun Yingsha | 11 | 11 | 11 | 8 | 11
10 | (Puerto Rico) Adriana Diaz | 5 | 5 | 8 | 11 | 7
12 | (South Korea) Suh Hyo-won | 8 | 7 | 5 | 4
6 | (Japan) Kasumi Ishikawa | 11 | 11 | 11 | 11
8 | (Hong Kong) Doo Hoi Kem | 11 | 4 | 11 | 12 | 3 | 7 | 6
15 | (Chinese Taipei) Chen Szu-yu | 8 | 11 | 3 | 10 | 11 | 11 | 11
9 | (South Korea) Jeon Ji-hee | 11 | 7 | 7 | 11 | 7
2 | (Japan) Mima Ito | 6 | 11 | 11 | 13 | 11

Quarterfinals
1 | (China) Chen Meng | 11 | 11 | 11 | 11
16 | (United States) Lily Zhang | 8 | 6 | 3 | 9
14 | (Germany) Han Ying | 12 | 3 | 7 | 11 | 12 | 11
4 | (Chinese Taipei) Cheng I-ching | 10 | 11 | 11 | 9 | 10 | 6
3 | (China) Sun Yingsha | 11 | 11 | 11 | 11
6 | (Japan) Kasumi Ishikawa | 6 | 4 | 4 | 7
15 | (Chinese Taipei) Chen Szu-yu | 6 | 6 | 7 | 11 | 5
2 | (Japan) Mima Ito | 11 | 11 | 11 | 6 | 11

Semifinals
1 | (China) Chen Meng | 4 | 11 | 11 | 11 | 7 | 9 | 11
14 | (Germany) Han Ying | 11 | 8 | 8 | 9 | 11 | 11 | 4
3 | (China) Sun Yingsha | 12 | 11 | 11 | 10 | 4 | 11
2 | (Japan) Mima Ito | 10 | 8 | 6 | 12 | 11 | 4

Final
1 | (China) Chen Meng | 11 | 11 | 11 | 11 | 11
3 | (China) Sun Yingsha | 13 | 6 | 9 | 6 | 8
Third place
14 | (Germany) Han Ying | 2 | 7 | 9 | 4
2 | (Japan) Mima Ito | 11 | 11 | 11 | 11

== See also ==
- 2020 World Team Table Tennis Championships
- 2020 ITTF World Tour
- 2020 ITTF Finals
- 2020 ITTF Men's World Cup
