= Chen Meng =

Chinese table tennis player

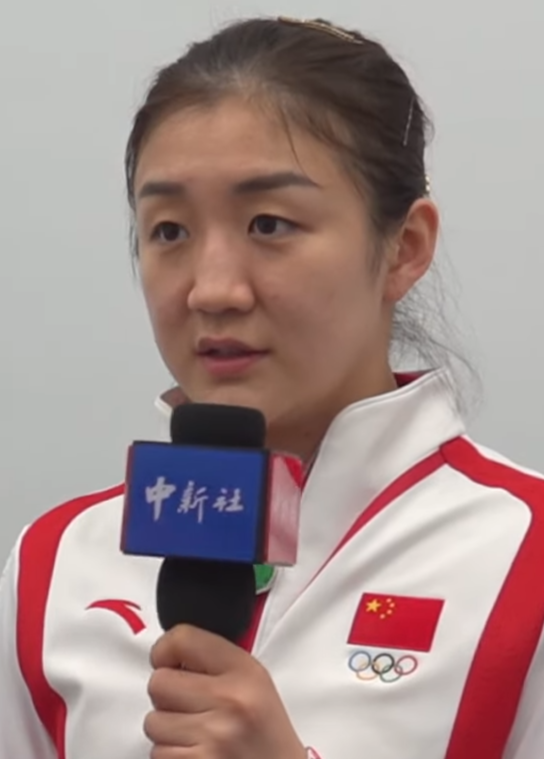
- Chen interviewed by China News Service in 2024

Personal information
- Native name: 陈梦
- Born: 15 January 1994 (age 32) Qingdao, Shandong, China
- Height: 1.66 m (5 ft 5 in)

Sport
- Sport: Table tennis
- Playing style: Right-handed, shakehand grip
- Equipment: Butterfly Viscaria, Forehand rubber DHS Hurricane 3, Backhand rubber DHS Hurricane 8
- Highest ranking: 1 (January 2018)
Medal record
Women's table tennis
Representing China
| Event | 1st | 2nd | 3rd |
|---|---|---|---|
| Olympic Games | 4 | 0 | 0 |
| World Championships | 6 | 3 | 4 |
| World Cup / Cup Finals | 2 | 1 | 2 |
| Total | 12 | 4 | 6 |
Olympic Games
| Gold medal – first place | 2020 Tokyo | Team |
| Gold medal – first place | 2020 Tokyo | Singles |
| Gold medal – first place | 2024 Paris | Singles |
| Gold medal – first place | 2024 Paris | Team |
World Championships
| Gold medal – first place | 2014 Tokyo | Team |
| Gold medal – first place | 2016 Kuala Lumpur | Team |
| Gold medal – first place | 2018 Halmstad | Team |
| Gold medal – first place | 2022 Chengdu | Team |
| Gold medal – first place | 2023 Durban | Doubles |
| Gold medal – first place | 2024 Busan | Team |
| Silver medal – second place | 2017 Düsseldorf | Doubles |
| Silver medal – second place | 2019 Budapest | Singles |
| Silver medal – second place | 2023 Durban | Singles |
| Bronze medal – third place | 2013 Paris | Doubles |
| Bronze medal – third place | 2019 Budapest | Doubles |
| Bronze medal – third place | 2021 Houston | Singles |
| Bronze medal – third place | 2021 Houston | Doubles |
World Cup
| Gold medal – first place | 2020 Weihai | Singles |
| Gold medal – first place | 2023 Chengdu | Mixed team |
| Bronze medal – third place | 2024 Macao | Singles |
WTT Cup Finals
| Silver medal – second place | 2022 Xinxiang | Singles |
| Bronze medal – third place | 2021 Singapore | Singles |
Asian Games
| Gold medal – first place | 2014 Incheon | Doubles |
| Gold medal – first place | 2014 Incheon | Team |
| Gold medal – first place | 2018 Jakarta Palembang | Team |
| Gold medal – first place | 2022 Hangzhou | Team |
| Silver medal – second place | 2018 Jakarta Palembang | Singles |
Asian Championships
| Gold medal – first place | 2013 Busan | Doubles |
| Gold medal – first place | 2013 Busan | Team |
| Gold medal – first place | 2017 Wuxi | Doubles |
| Gold medal – first place | 2023 Pyeongchang | Doubles |
| Gold medal – first place | 2023 Pyeongchang | Team |
| Silver medal – second place | 2017 Wuxi | Singles |
| Bronze medal – third place | 2013 Busan | Singles |
East Asian Games
| Gold medal – first place | 2013 Tianjin | Doubles |
| Gold medal – first place | 2013 Tianjin | Singles |
| Gold medal – first place | 2013 Tianjin | Team |
World Junior Championships
| Gold medal – first place | 2008 Madrid | Team |
| Gold medal – first place | 2009 Cartagena | Doubles |
| Gold medal – first place | 2009 Cartagena | Team |
| Gold medal – first place | 2011 Manama | Mixed doubles |
| Gold medal – first place | 2011 Manama | Doubles |
| Gold medal – first place | 2011 Manama | Singles |
| Gold medal – first place | 2011 Manama | Team |
| Bronze medal – third place | 2009 Cartagena | Singles |
Asian Youth Games
| Gold medal – first place | 2009 Singapore | Singles |
| Gold medal – first place | 2009 Singapore | Mixed Team |
| Silver medal – second place | 2009 Singapore | Mixed Doubles |
Asian Junior Championships
| Gold medal – first place | 2009 Jaipur | Singles |
| Gold medal – first place | 2009 Jaipur | Team |

Chen Meng (Chinese: 陈梦; born 15 January 1994) is a Chinese professional table tennis player and Olympic champion. She joined the provincial team when she was 9 and joined the national team when she was only 13 in 2007. She is the women's singles champion of the ITTF Women's World Cup in 2020, the ITTF World Tour Grand Finals in 2017, 2018, 2019 and 2020 and also at the inaugural WTT Singapore Smash. She is also the silver medalist of women's singles in the 2019 World Table Tennis Championships and a double gold medalist in the 2020 Summer Olympics. She obtained her second gold medal in the 2024 Summer Olympics in Paris.

== Career ==
=== 2020 ===
After competitive table tennis resumed following the pandemic, Chen swept the world cup, ITTF pro tour finals, and 2020 All China National Championships.

=== 2021 ===
In May, Chen was selected to represent China in the women's singles and team event at the Tokyo Olympics. Chen won the first leg of the Chinese Olympic Scrimmage but lost to Wang Manyu in the finals of the second leg. Chen again lost to Wang in a closed-door scrimmage in June.

In an interview in July, Chen revealed that she had been in close contact with Ma Lin and Li Xiaoxia regarding mental preparations for the Tokyo Olympics.

At the 2020 Summer Olympics, Chen competed in the women's singles event, winning her semifinals match against Singapore's Yu Mengyu 4–0 and her quarterfinals match against Hong Kong's Doo Hoi Kem 4–2 after trailing 2–0. In the finals match, she defeated compatriot Sun Yingsha 4–2 to win the gold medal. After the match, Chen noted that both she and Sun were both very nervous but played okay, and that Chen's extra experience helped push her over the top. In the women's team event, Chen, along with Sun Yingsha and Wang Manyu, defeated Japan 3–0 in the finals to win the gold medal, continuing China's undefeated streak in the event.

In August 2021, Chen remarked that the level of play at the China National Games was harder than the Olympics. At the National Games of China in September, Chen placed fourth, but her bronze-medal-match opponent Liu Shiwen remarked that Chen was injured and playing far below her normal level.

=== 2024 ===
On 3 August 2024, Chen Meng won the gold medal in the women's singles final at the Paris Olympics, defeating Sun Yingsha 4–2. On 10 August, she helped secure the women's team title alongside her teammates, earning the People's Republic of China its 300th gold medal at the Summer Olympics.

== Titles (senior level) ==
=== Singles ===
- ITTF World Tour Grand Finals – 2017, 2018, 2019, 2020
- ITTF World Tour (15) – China open 2012, 2013, 2019, Qatar open 2012, 2017, 2020, Swedish open 2013, 2019, Japan open 2015, Australian open 2017, German open 2017, 2020, Austrian open 2018, Korea open 2019, Hungarian open 2019
- World Cup – 2020
- Summer Olympics – Gold Medal 2020, Gold Medal 2024
- WTT Grand Smash – Singapore 2022, Saudi 2024

=== Doubles ===
- ITTF World Tour Grand Finals – 2017 (with Zhu Yuling)
- ITTF World Tour (13) –
  - with Zhu: Kuwait 2012, China 2012, 2013, 2016, Australian 2017
  - with Liu Shiwen: China 2015, Japan 2019
  - with Mu Zi: Swedish 2015
  - with Wang Manyu: Qatar 2017, Australian 2019, Korea 2019
  - with Ding Ning: Korea 2018, Swedish 2019

=== Team ===
- Summer Olympics Women's Team Gold Medal 2020, Gold Medal 2024
  - with Sun Yingsha: Wang Manyu

== Personal life ==
Chen and actor Huang Xiaoming are second cousins; their paternal grandmothers are sisters. He congratulated her on Weibo right after she won the women's singles title.
