= 2024 World Team Table Tennis Championships =

2024 edition of the World Team Table Tennis Championships

- Venue: Busan Exhibition and Convention Center
- Location: Busan, South Korea
- Dates: 16–25 February
- Nations: 47 (40 men's teams, 40 women's teams)

Champions
- Men: China
- Women: China

The 2024 World Team Table Tennis Championships were held in Busan, South Korea from 16 to 25 February 2024. Quarterfinalists of the event qualified for the 2024 Summer Olympics.

== Bid ==
Busan was selected as the first South Korean city to host World Table Tennis Championships in 2018. The 2020 World Team Table Tennis Championships were originally scheduled to be held in Busan from 22 to 29 March 2020, but were postponed due to the COVID-19 pandemic, initially until 27 September to 4 October 2020, then until 28 February to 7 March 2021. However, on 22 December it was announced that the event had been cancelled.

In May 2021, Busan launched another bid for the 2024 World Championships, and won the bid in November 2021.

== Qualification ==
Number of teams eligible to compete for the trophy in each team event is 40.

Continental Stage – 33 teams will qualify from the Continental Stage. The continental quota allocation is the following: 4 for Africa, 6 for the Americas, 10 for Asia, 11 for Europe, and 2 for Oceania. Numbers are according to the "2020 BoD Proposition 28".

China News Service video about the Chinese team performance.

Host nation – spot is guaranteed. If the host nation is already qualified through the Continental Stage, the host quota will be reallocated to the ITTF WTR Oct 2023.

Intercontinental Stage – As per the decision of the ITTF Council, in Bangkok on 23 August 2023, no Intercontinental Stage will be held in 2023. Instead, the remaining six places shall be allocated as follows:

Five places are transferred to the five continents as follows: Africa 1, the Americas 1, Asia 1, Europe 1, and Oceania 1; with the final allocation as per qualifying event or Team World Ranking (TWR) to be confirmed by each continental federation.

The remaining one place will go to the highest-ranked not-yet-qualified team on the ITTF WTR November 2023.

Qualification	Men's team	Women's team
Host nation	South Korea	South Korea
Africa (5); 2023 African Championships (4) and world team ranking (1)	Egypt; Nigeria; Algeria; ~~Tunisia~~; Madagascar	Egypt; Nigeria; Algeria; ~~Tunisia~~; ~~Mauritius~~
Americas (7); 2023 Pan American Championships (4) and world team ranking (3)	Brazil; Canada; Chile; Puerto Rico; United States; ~~Argentina~~; Cuba	United States; Brazil; Chile; Puerto Rico; Canada; Mexico; ~~Argentina~~
Asia (11); 2023 Asian Championships (10) and world team ranking (1)	China; Chinese Taipei; India; Japan; Iran; Singapore; Kazakhstan; Hong Kong; Thailand; Malaysia; Saudi Arabia	China; Hong Kong; Japan; Thailand; India; Singapore; Kazakhstan; Iran; Uzbekistan; Chinese Taipei; Malaysia
Europe (12); 2023 European Championships (8) and world team ranking (4)	Sweden; Germany; France; Portugal; Hungary; Croatia; Belgium; Denmark; Slovenia; England; Poland; Slovakia	Germany; Romania; France; Portugal; Italy; Spain; Sweden; Slovakia; Hungary; Luxembourg; Poland; Austria
Oceania (3); 2023 Oceanian Championships (2) and world team ranking (1)	Australia; New Zealand; ~~Tahiti~~	Australia; ~~New Zealand~~; ~~Tahiti~~
Intercontinental quota (1) world team ranking	Romania	Czech Republic
Reallocation	Austria; Czech Republic; Serbia	Cuba; Croatia; South Africa; Serbia; Ukraine

== Schedule ==
The draw took place on 16 January 2024.

Event↓/Date →	Fri 16	Sat 17	Sun 18	Mon 19	Tue 20	Wed 21		Thu 22	Fri 23	Sat 24	Sun 25
Men's team	Group					1/16 F	1/8 F	QF		SF	F
Women's team	Group					1/16 F	1/8 F	QF	SF	F	

== Medal summary ==
=== Medal table ===
* Host nation (South Korea)

Rank	Nation	Gold	Silver	Bronze	Total
1	China	2	0	0	2
2	France	0	1	1	2
3	Japan	0	1	0	1
4	Chinese Taipei	0	0	1	1
4	Hong Kong	0	0	1	1
4	South Korea*	0	0	1	1
Totals (6 entries)		2	2	4	8

=== Medalists ===
Event	Gold	Silver	Bronze
Men's team	China; Fan Zhendong; Wang Chuqin; Ma Long; Liang Jingkun; Lin Gaoyuan	France; Félix Lebrun; Alexis Lebrun; Simon Gauzy; Jules Rolland; Lilian Bardet	South Korea; Jang Woo-jin; Lim Jong-hoon; Lee Sang-su; An Jae-hyun; Park Gyu-hyeon
Men's team	China; Fan Zhendong; Wang Chuqin; Ma Long; Liang Jingkun; Lin Gaoyuan	France; Félix Lebrun; Alexis Lebrun; Simon Gauzy; Jules Rolland; Lilian Bardet	Chinese Taipei; Lin Yun-ju; Kao Cheng-jui; Chuang Chih-yuan; Feng Yi-hsin; Huang Yan-cheng
Women's team	China; Sun Yingsha; Wang Yidi; Chen Meng; Wang Manyu; Chen Xingtong	Japan; Hina Hayata; Mima Ito; Miwa Harimoto; Miu Hirano; Miyuu Kihara	France; Jia Nan Yuan; Prithika Pavade; Camille Lutz; Audrey Zarif; Charlotte Lutz
Women's team	China; Sun Yingsha; Wang Yidi; Chen Meng; Wang Manyu; Chen Xingtong	Japan; Hina Hayata; Mima Ito; Miwa Harimoto; Miu Hirano; Miyuu Kihara	Hong Kong; Zhu Chengzhu; Doo Hoi Kem; Lam Yee Lok; Ng Wing Lam; Lee Ho Ching
