= List of World Junior Table Tennis Championships medalists =

== Winners ==
| Year | Team | | Singles | | Doubles | | |
| Year | Boys' | Girls' | Boys' | Girls' | Boys' | Girls' | Mixed |
|---|---|---|---|---|---|---|---|
| 2003 | China | China | (China) Li Hu | (China) Li Qian | (Japan) Seiya Kishikawa (Japan) Minoru Muramori | (China) Li Xiaoxia (China) Li Qian | (China) Zheng Changgong (China) Li Xiaoxia |
| 2004 | China | China | (China) Ma Long | (China) Chang Chenchen | (Japan) Seiya Kishikawa (Japan) Jun Mizutani | (China) Chang Chenchen (China) Liu Shiwen | (China) Zhou Bin (China) Liu Shiwen |
| 2005 | Japan | China | (Germany) Patrick Baum | (China) Ding Ning | (Chinese Taipei) Chiang Hung-chieh (Chinese Taipei) Huang Sheng-sheng | (China) Ding Ning (China) Peng Xue | (South Korea) Kang Dong-hoon (South Korea) Shim Se-rom |
| 2006 | China | China | (Japan) Kenta Matsudaira | (China) Feng Yalan | (China) Jiang Haiyang (China) Wu Hao | (China) Wen Jia (China) Mu Zi | (China) Xu Ke (China) Mu Zi |
| 2007 | China | China | (South Korea) Jeong Sang-Eun | (China) Yang Yang | (China) Song Shichao (China) Yan An | (China) Wen Jia (China) Li Xiaodan | (China) Xu Ruifeng (China) Mu Zi |
| 2008 | China | China | (Chinese Taipei) Chen Chien-an | (China) Cao Lisi | (China) Yan An (China) Song Hongyuan | (China) Cao Lisi (China) Wang Daqin | (China) Song Hongyuan (China) Cao Lisi |
| 2009 | China | China | (China) Fang Bo | (China) Wu Yang | (China) Fang Bo (China) Song Hongyuan | (China) Chen Meng (China) Gu Yuting | (China) Fang Bo (China) Gu Yuting |
| 2010 | China | Japan | (China) Song Hongyuan | (China) Zhu Yuling | (Japan) Asuka Machi (Japan) Koki Niwa | (China) Gu Yuting (China) Zhu Yuling | (China) Wu Jiaji (China) Gu Yuting |
| 2011 | China | China | (Japan) Koki Niwa | (China) Chen Meng | (China) Song Hongyuan (China) Zheng Peifeng | (China) Chen Meng (China) Gu Yuting | (China) Song Hongyuan (China) Chen Meng |
| 2012 | China | China | (China) Fan Zhendong | (China) Zhu Yuling | (China) Lin Gaoyuan (China) Xu Chenhao | (China) Gu Yuting (China) Zhu Yuling | (China) Fan Zhendong (China) Liu Gaoyang |
| 2013 | China | China | (South Korea) Jang Woo-jin | (China) Gu Yuting | (China) Kong Lingxuan (China) Zhou Qihao | (China) Gu Yuting (China) Liu Xi | (China) Kong Lingxuan (China) Liu Xi |
| 2014 | China | China | (China) Yu Ziyang | (China) Wang Manyu | (China) Lyu Xiang (China) Xue Fei | (China) Chen Xingtong (China) Liu Gaoyang | (China) Wang Chuqin (China) Chen Xingtong |
| 2015 | China | China | (China) Liu Dingshuo | (China) Wang Manyu | (China) Wang Chuqin (China) Xue Fei | (China) Chen Ke (China) Wang Manyu | (China) Xue Fei (China) Chen Ke |
| 2016 | Japan | Japan | (Japan) Tomokazu Harimoto | (China) Shi Xunyao | (South Korea) An Jae-hyun (South Korea) Cho Seung-min | (Romania) Adina Diaconu (Romania) Andreea Dragoman | (South Korea) Choi Seung-min (South Korea) Kim Ji-ho |
| 2017 | China | China | (China) Xue Fei | (China) Sun Yingsha | (China) Wang Chuqin (China) Xue Fei | (China) Shi Xunyao (China) Sun Yingsha | (China) Xue Fei (China) Wang Manyu |
| 2018 | China | China | (China) Xu Haidong | (China) Qian Tianyi | (China) Xu Haidong (China) Xiang Peng | (China) Shi Xunyao (China) Huang Fanzhen | (China) Xu Yingbin (China) Shi Xunyao |
| 2019 | China | China | (China) Xiang Peng | (Japan) Miyu Nagasaki | (China) Liu Yebo (China) Xu Yingbin | (Japan) Miyuu Kihara (Japan) Miyu Nagasaki | (Japan) Yukiya Uda (Japan) Miyuu Kihara |

== Results of individual events ==
The tables below are World Junior medalists of individual events (boys' and girls' singles, boys' and girls' doubles, and mixed doubles).

=== Boys' singles ===
| Year | Host City | Gold | Silver | Bronze |
|---|---|---|---|---|
| 2003 | Santiago | (China) Li Hu | (South Korea) Cho Eon-rae | (South Korea) Lim Jae-hyun |
| 2003 | Santiago | (China) Li Hu | (South Korea) Cho Eon-rae | (China) Zheng Changgong |
| 2004 | Kobe | (China) Ma Long | (South Korea) Cho Eon-rae | (China) Lin Chen |
| 2004 | Kobe | (China) Ma Long | (South Korea) Cho Eon-rae | (Chinese Taipei) Wu Chih-chi |
| 2005 | Linz | (Germany) Patrick Baum | (Japan) Jun Mizutani | (Sweden) Fabian Åkerström |
| 2005 | Linz | (Germany) Patrick Baum | (Japan) Jun Mizutani | (Chinese Taipei) Huang Sheng-sheng |
| 2006 | Cairo | (Japan) Kenta Matsudaira | (China) Xu Ke | (Germany) Dimitrij Ovtcharov |
| 2006 | Cairo | (Japan) Kenta Matsudaira | (China) Xu Ke | (Japan) Hidetoshi Oya |
| 2007 | Palo Alto | (South Korea) Jeong Sang-eun | (China) Xu Ruifeng | (South Korea) Lee Sang-su |
| 2007 | Palo Alto | (South Korea) Jeong Sang-eun | (China) Xu Ruifeng | (Russia) Mikhail Paykov |
| 2008 | Madrid | (Chinese Taipei) Chen Chien-an | (England) Paul Drinkhall | (South Korea) Lee Sang-su |
| 2008 | Madrid | (Chinese Taipei) Chen Chien-an | (England) Paul Drinkhall | (China) Yan An |
| 2009 | Colombia | (China) Fang Bo | (China) Yan An | (China) Lin Gaoyuan |
| 2009 | Colombia | (China) Fang Bo | (China) Yan An | (China) Song Hongyuan |
| 2010 | Bratislava | (China) Song Hongyuan | (China) Lin Gaoyuan | (China) Wu Jiaji |
| 2010 | Bratislava | (China) Song Hongyuan | (China) Lin Gaoyuan | (China) Zhou Yu |
| 2011 | Manama | (Japan) Koki Niwa | (China) Lin Gaoyuan | (France) Quentin Robinot |
| 2011 | Manama | (Japan) Koki Niwa | (China) Lin Gaoyuan | (Japan) Maharu Yoshimura |
| 2012 | Hyderabad | (China) Fan Zhendong | (China) Lin Gaoyuan | (China) Fan Shengpeng |
| 2012 | Hyderabad | (China) Fan Zhendong | (China) Lin Gaoyuan | (China) Xu Chenhao |
| 2013 | Rabat | (South Korea) Jang Woo-jin | (China) Zhou Kai | (China) Kong Lingxuan |
| 2013 | Rabat | (South Korea) Jang Woo-jin | (China) Zhou Kai | (Japan) Masataka Morizono |
| 2014 | Shanghai | (China) Yu Ziyang | (Japan) Yuto Muramatsu | (China) Liu Dingshuo |
| 2014 | Shanghai | (China) Yu Ziyang | (Japan) Yuto Muramatsu | (China) Xue Fei |
| 2015 | Vendée | (China) Liu Dingshuo | (China) Xue Fei | (China) Wang Chuqin |
| 2015 | Vendée | (China) Liu Dingshuo | (China) Xue Fei | (China) Zhu Cheng |
| 2016 | Cape Town | (Japan) Tomokazu Harimoto | (South Korea) Cho Seung-min | (Hong Kong) Ng Pak Nam |
| 2016 | Cape Town | (Japan) Tomokazu Harimoto | (South Korea) Cho Seung-min | (China) Yang Shuo |
| 2017 | Riva del Garda | (China) Xue Fei | (Sweden) Truls Moregard | (China) Niu Guankai |
| 2017 | Riva del Garda | (China) Xue Fei | (Sweden) Truls Moregard | (China) Wang Chuqin |
| 2018 | Bendigo | (China) Xu Haidong | (Japan) Yukiya Uda | (Romania) Cristian Pletea |
| 2018 | Bendigo | (China) Xu Haidong | (Japan) Yukiya Uda | (China) Xiang Peng |
| 2019 | Korat | (China) Xiang Peng | (Sweden) Truls Moregard | (Chinese Taipei) Feng Yi-hsin |
| 2019 | Korat | (China) Xiang Peng | (Sweden) Truls Moregard | (Japan) Shunsuke Togami |

=== Girls' singles ===
| Year | Host City | Gold | Silver | Bronze |
|---|---|---|---|---|
| 2003 | Santiago | (China) Li Qian | (China) Peng Luyang | (China) Cao Zhen |
| 2003 | Santiago | (China) Li Qian | (China) Peng Luyang | (China) Li Xiaoxia |
| 2004 | Kobe | (China) Chang Chenchen | (China) Liu Shiwen | (China) Fan Ying |
| 2004 | Kobe | (China) Chang Chenchen | (China) Liu Shiwen | (Japan) Ai Fukuhara |
| 2005 | Linz | (China) Ding Ning | (China) Peng Xue | (Germany) Zhenqi Barthel |
| 2005 | Linz | (China) Ding Ning | (China) Peng Xue | (South Korea) Shim Se-rom |
| 2006 | Cairo | (China) Feng Yalan | (China) Wen Jia | (China) Mu Zi |
| 2006 | Cairo | (China) Feng Yalan | (China) Wen Jia | (China) Wu Yang |
| 2007 | Palo Alto | (China) Yang Yang | (China) Wen Jia | (China) Mu Zi |
| 2007 | Palo Alto | (China) Yang Yang | (China) Wen Jia | (Germany) Amelie Solja |
| 2008 | Madrid | (China) Cao Lisi | (Germany) Amelie Solja | (Japan) Ayuka Tanioka |
| 2008 | Madrid | (China) Cao Lisi | (Germany) Amelie Solja | (China) Wang Daqin |
| 2009 | Colombia | (China) Wu Yang | (China) Gu Yuting | (China) Cao Lisi |
| 2009 | Colombia | (China) Wu Yang | (China) Gu Yuting | (China) Chen Meng |
| 2010 | Bratislava | (China) Zhu Yuling | (Japan) Kasumi Ishikawa | (South Korea) Yang Ha-eun |
| 2010 | Bratislava | (China) Zhu Yuling | (Japan) Kasumi Ishikawa | (China) Yi Fangxian |
| 2011 | Manama | (China) Chen Meng | (China) Zhu Yuling | (China) Gu Ruochen |
| 2011 | Manama | (China) Chen Meng | (China) Zhu Yuling | (China) Gu Yuting |
| 2012 | Hyderabad | (China) Zhu Yuling | (China) Gu Yuting | (China) Gu Ruochen |
| 2012 | Hyderabad | (China) Zhu Yuling | (China) Gu Yuting | (Germany) Petrissa Solja |
| 2013 | Rabat | (China) Gu Yuting | (China) Liu Gaoyang | (China) Liu Xi |
| 2013 | Rabat | (China) Gu Yuting | (China) Liu Gaoyang | (China) Wang Manyu |
| 2014 | Shanghai | (China) Wang Manyu | (China) Zhu Chaohui | (China) Chen Ke |
| 2014 | Shanghai | (China) Wang Manyu | (China) Zhu Chaohui | (China) He Zhuojia |
| 2015 | Vendée | (China) Wang Manyu | (China) Wang Yidi | (China) Chen Ke |
| 2015 | Vendée | (China) Wang Manyu | (China) Wang Yidi | (China) Chen Xingtong |
| 2016 | Cape Town | (China) Shi Xunyao | (Hong Kong) Mak Tze Wing | (Romania) Adina Diaconu |
| 2016 | Cape Town | (China) Shi Xunyao | (Hong Kong) Mak Tze Wing | (Japan) Miyu Kato |
| 2017 | Riva del Garda | (China) Sun Yingsha | (China) Wang Manyu | (Japan) Miyu Kato |
| 2017 | Riva del Garda | (China) Sun Yingsha | (China) Wang Manyu | (China) Qian Tianyi |
| 2018 | Bendigo | (China) Qian Tianyi | (China) Shi Xunyao | (Japan) Yumeno Soma |
| 2018 | Bendigo | (China) Qian Tianyi | (China) Shi Xunyao | (Chinese Taipei) Su Pei-ling |
| 2019 | Korat | (Japan) Miyu Nagasaki | (Japan) Haruna Ojio | (North Korea) Kim Un-song |
| 2019 | Korat | (Japan) Miyu Nagasaki | (Japan) Haruna Ojio | (China) Wu Yangchen |

=== Boys' doubles ===
| Year | Host City | Gold | Silver | Bronze |
|---|---|---|---|---|
| 2003 | Santiago | (Japan) Seiya Kishikawa (Japan) Minoru Muramori | (Portugal) Tiago Apolónia (Portugal) Marcos Freitas | (Canada) Bence Csaba (Canada) Faazil Kassam |
| 2003 | Santiago | (Japan) Seiya Kishikawa (Japan) Minoru Muramori | (Portugal) Tiago Apolónia (Portugal) Marcos Freitas | (China) Zhang Jike (China) Zheng Changgong |
| 2004 | Kobe | (Japan) Seiya Kishikawa (Japan) Jun Mizutani | (China) Ma Long (China) Zhou Bin | (South Korea) Cho Eon-rae (South Korea) Lee Jin-kwon |
| 2004 | Kobe | (Japan) Seiya Kishikawa (Japan) Jun Mizutani | (China) Ma Long (China) Zhou Bin | (Croatia) Andrej Gaćina (Croatia) Tomislav Zubčić |
| 2005 | Linz | (Chinese Taipei) Chiang Hung-chieh (Chinese Taipei) Huang Sheng-sheng | (Russia) Stanislav Golovanov (Russia) Kirill Skachkov | (South Korea) Kang Dong-hoon (South Korea) Lee Jin-kwon |
| 2005 | Linz | (Chinese Taipei) Chiang Hung-chieh (Chinese Taipei) Huang Sheng-sheng | (Russia) Stanislav Golovanov (Russia) Kirill Skachkov | (Japan) Seiya Kishikawa (Japan) Jun Mizutani |
| 2006 | Cairo | (China) Jiang Haiyang (China) Wu Hao | (China) Xu Ke (China) Xu Ruifeng | (Portugal) Marcos Freitas (Portugal) Andre Silva |
| 2006 | Cairo | (China) Jiang Haiyang (China) Wu Hao | (China) Xu Ke (China) Xu Ruifeng | (Japan) Kenji Matsudaira (Japan) Hidetoshi Oya |
| 2007 | Palo Alto | (China) Song Shichao (China) Yan An | (Japan) Kenji Matsudaira (Japan) Jin Ueda | (Russia) Mikhail Paykov (Russia) Artem Utochkin |
| 2007 | Palo Alto | (China) Song Shichao (China) Yan An | (Japan) Kenji Matsudaira (Japan) Jin Ueda | (China) Xu Ruifeng (China) Zhang Shengwunan |
| 2008 | Madrid | (China) Yan An (China) Song Hongyuan | (South Korea) Lee Sang-su (South Korea) Seo Hyun-deok | (South Korea) Jung Young-sik (South Korea) Kim Min-seok |
| 2008 | Madrid | (China) Yan An (China) Song Hongyuan | (South Korea) Lee Sang-su (South Korea) Seo Hyun-deok | (Japan) Kenta Matsudaira (Japan) Koki Niwa |
| 2009 | Colombia | (China) Fang Bo (China) Song Hongyuan | (China) Lin Gaoyuan (China) Yan An | (South Korea) Jung Young-sik (South Korea) Kim Min-seok |
| 2009 | Colombia | (China) Fang Bo (China) Song Hongyuan | (China) Lin Gaoyuan (China) Yan An | (Japan) Koki Niwa (Japan) Jin Ueda |
| 2010 | Bratislava | (Japan) Asuka Machi (Japan) Koki Niwa | (France) Simon Gauzy (France) Quentin Robinot | (Germany) Patrick Franziska (Germany) Arne Holter |
| 2010 | Bratislava | (Japan) Asuka Machi (Japan) Koki Niwa | (France) Simon Gauzy (France) Quentin Robinot | (China) Lin Gaoyuan (China) Zhou Yu |
| 2011 | Manama | (China) Song Hongyuan (China) Zheng Peifeng | (France) Simon Gauzy (France) Quentin Robinot | (China) Lin Gaoyuan (China) Wu Jiaji |
| 2011 | Manama | (China) Song Hongyuan (China) Zheng Peifeng | (France) Simon Gauzy (France) Quentin Robinot | (Japan) Koki Niwa (Japan) Maharu Yoshimura |
| 2012 | Hyderabad | (China) Lin Gaoyuan (China) Xu Chenhao | (China) Fan Shengpeng (China) Fan Zhendong | (Chinese Taipei) Hung Tzu-hsiang (Chinese Taipei) Lee Chia-sheng |
| 2012 | Hyderabad | (China) Lin Gaoyuan (China) Xu Chenhao | (China) Fan Shengpeng (China) Fan Zhendong | (Japan) Yuto Muramatsu (Japan) Asuka Sakai |
| 2013 | Rabat | (China) Kong Lingxuan (China) Zhou Qihao | (South Korea) Jang Woo-jin (South Korea) Park Chan-hyeok | (France) Angles Enzo (France) Flore Tristan |
| 2013 | Rabat | (China) Kong Lingxuan (China) Zhou Qihao | (South Korea) Jang Woo-jin (South Korea) Park Chan-hyeok | (China) Liang Jingkun (China) Zhou Kai |
| 2014 | Shanghai | (China) Lyu Xiang (China) Xue Fei | (South Korea) Cho Seung-min (South Korea) Kim Min-hyeok | (China) Liu Dingshuo (China) Wang Chuqin |
| 2014 | Shanghai | (China) Lyu Xiang (China) Xue Fei | (South Korea) Cho Seung-min (South Korea) Kim Min-hyeok | (Chinese Taipei) Peng Wang-wei (Chinese Taipei) Wang Tai-wei |
| 2015 | Vendée | (China) Wang Chuqin (China) Xue Fei | (China) Liu Dingshuo (China) Zhu Cheng | (South Korea) An Jae-hyun (South Korea) Cho Seung-min |
| 2015 | Vendée | (China) Wang Chuqin (China) Xue Fei | (China) Liu Dingshuo (China) Zhu Cheng | (Hong Kong) Ho Kwan Kit (Hong Kong) Ng Pak Nam |
| 2016 | Cape Town | (South Korea) An Jae-hyun (South Korea) Cho Seung-min | (Japan) Tomokazu Harimoto (Japan) Tonin Ryuzaki | (France) Alexandre Cassin (France) Joe Seyfried |
| 2016 | Cape Town | (South Korea) An Jae-hyun (South Korea) Cho Seung-min | (Japan) Tomokazu Harimoto (Japan) Tonin Ryuzaki | (Chinese Taipei) Huang Chien-tu (Chinese Taipei) Lin Yun-ju |
| 2017 | Riva del Garda | (China) Wang Chuqin (China) Xue Fei | (South Korea) An Jae-hyun (South Korea) Baek Ho-gyun | (Japan) Takami Masaki (Japan) Kizukuri Yuto |
| 2017 | Riva del Garda | (China) Wang Chuqin (China) Xue Fei | (South Korea) An Jae-hyun (South Korea) Baek Ho-gyun | (Japan) Uda Yukiya (Japan) Tanaka Yuta |
| 2018 | Bendigo | (China) Xiang Peng (China) Xu Haidong | (Russia) Maksim Grebnev (Russia) Lev Katsman | (France) Irvin Bertrand (France) Leo De Nodrest |
| 2018 | Bendigo | (China) Xiang Peng (China) Xu Haidong | (Russia) Maksim Grebnev (Russia) Lev Katsman | (Chinese Taipei) Feng Yi-hsin (Chinese Taipei) Li Hsin-yang |
| 2019 | Korat | (China) Liu Yebo (China) Xu Yingbin | (Russia) Vladimir Sidorenko (Russia) Artem Tikhonov | (Singapore) Chua Josh Shao Han (Singapore) Pang Yew En Koen |
| 2019 | Korat | (China) Liu Yebo (China) Xu Yingbin | (Russia) Vladimir Sidorenko (Russia) Artem Tikhonov | (China) Xiang Peng (China) Zeng Beixun |

=== Girls' doubles ===
| Year | Host City | Gold | Silver | Bronze |
|---|---|---|---|---|
| 2003 | Santiago | (China) Li Qian (China) Li Xiaoxia | (Serbia and Montenegro) Gabriela Feher (Serbia and Montenegro) Eva Tapai | (Japan) Ai Fukuhara (Japan) Sayaka Hirano |
| 2003 | Santiago | (China) Li Qian (China) Li Xiaoxia | (Serbia and Montenegro) Gabriela Feher (Serbia and Montenegro) Eva Tapai | (Germany) Gaby Rohr (Germany) Meike Rohr |
| 2004 | Kobe | (China) Chang Chenchen (China) Liu Shiwen | (China) Fan Ying (China) Wang Xuan | (Romania) Daniela Dodean (Romania) Elizabeta Samara |
| 2004 | Kobe | (China) Chang Chenchen (China) Liu Shiwen | (China) Fan Ying (China) Wang Xuan | (South Korea) Jee Min-hyung (South Korea) Shim Se-rom |
| 2005 | Linz | (China) Ding Ning (China) Peng Xue | (Spain) Galia Dvorak (Spain) Sara Ramírez | (Japan) Yuka Ishigaki (Japan) Moemi Terui |
| 2005 | Linz | (China) Ding Ning (China) Peng Xue | (Spain) Galia Dvorak (Spain) Sara Ramírez | (Japan) Shiho Ono (Japan) Yuri Yamanashi |
| 2006 | Cairo | (China) Wen Jia (China) Mu Zi | (China) Feng Yalan (China) Wu Yang | (Japan) Yuka Ishigaki (Japan) Moemi Terui |
| 2006 | Cairo | (China) Wen Jia (China) Mu Zi | (China) Feng Yalan (China) Wu Yang | (Germany) Amelie Solja (Germany) Rosalia Stahr |
| 2007 | Palo Alto | (China) Wen Jia (China) Li Xiaodan | (China) Mu Zi (China) Yang Yang | (Romania) Ioana Ghemes (Romania) Elizabeta Samara |
| 2007 | Palo Alto | (China) Wen Jia (China) Li Xiaodan | (China) Mu Zi (China) Yang Yang | (Japan) Yuka Ishigaki (Japan) Misako Wakamiya |
| 2008 | Madrid | (China) Cao Lisi (China) Wang Daqin | (South Korea) Kim Min-hee (South Korea) Lee Hyun | (Japan) Yuko Fujii (Japan) Ayuka Tanioka |
| 2008 | Madrid | (China) Cao Lisi (China) Wang Daqin | (South Korea) Kim Min-hee (South Korea) Lee Hyun | (Japan) Kasumi Ishikawa (Japan) Misaki Morizono |
| 2009 | Colombia | (China) Chen Meng (China) Gu Yuting | (South Korea) Kim Min-hee (South Korea) Yang Ha-eun | (China) Cao Lisi (China) Wu Yang |
| 2009 | Colombia | (China) Chen Meng (China) Gu Yuting | (South Korea) Kim Min-hee (South Korea) Yang Ha-eun | (Hong Kong) Lee Ho Ching (Hong Kong) Ng Wing Nam |
| 2010 | Bratislava | (China) Gu Yuting (China) Zhu Yuling | (Japan) Kasumi Ishikawa (Japan) Misaki Morizono | (Japan) Miyu Maeda (Japan) Ayuka Tanioka |
| 2010 | Bratislava | (China) Gu Yuting (China) Zhu Yuling | (Japan) Kasumi Ishikawa (Japan) Misaki Morizono | (China) Yi Fangxian (China) Zhao Yan |
| 2011 | Manama | (China) Chen Meng (China) Gu Yuting | (China) Gu Ruochen (China) Zhu Yuling | (Chinese Taipei) Chen Szu-yu (Chinese Taipei) Cheng Hsien-tzu |
| 2011 | Manama | (China) Chen Meng (China) Gu Yuting | (China) Gu Ruochen (China) Zhu Yuling | (Romania) Irina Ciobanu (Romania) Bernadette Szőcs |
| 2012 | Hyderabad | (China) Gu Yuting (China) Zhu Yuling | (China) Gu Ruochen (China) Liu Gaoyang | (Romania) Irina Ciobanu (Romania) Bernadette Szőcs |
| 2012 | Hyderabad | (China) Gu Yuting (China) Zhu Yuling | (China) Gu Ruochen (China) Liu Gaoyang | (Japan) Miyu Maeda (Japan) Ayuka Tanioka |
| 2013 | Rabat | (China) Gu Yuting (China) Liu Xi | (China) Liu Gaoyang (China) Wang Manyu | (Serbia) Aneta Maksuti (Serbia) Viktoria Tružinski |
| 2013 | Rabat | (China) Gu Yuting (China) Liu Xi | (China) Liu Gaoyang (China) Wang Manyu | (South Korea) Jung Yu-mi (South Korea) Lee Da-som |
| 2014 | Shanghai | (China) Chen Xingtong (China) Liu Gaoyang | (Japan) Miu Hirano (Japan) Mima Ito | (China) He Zhuojia (China) Zhu Chaohui |
| 2014 | Shanghai | (China) Chen Xingtong (China) Liu Gaoyang | (Japan) Miu Hirano (Japan) Mima Ito | (South Korea) Ji Eun-chae (South Korea) Lee Zion |
| 2015 | Vendée | (China) Chen Ke (China) Wang Manyu | (North Korea) Ko Un-gum (North Korea) Ri Yong-hae | (South Korea) An Yeong-eun (South Korea) Kim Ji-ho |
| 2015 | Vendée | (China) Chen Ke (China) Wang Manyu | (North Korea) Ko Un-gum (North Korea) Ri Yong-hae | (South Korea) Kang Da-yeon (South Korea) Kim Ha-eun |
| 2016 | Cape Town | (Romania) Adina Diaconu (Romania) Andreea Dragoman | (Japan) Hina Hayata (Japan) Miyu Kato | (Hong Kong) Liu Qi (Hong Kong) Wong Chin Yau |
| 2016 | Cape Town | (Romania) Adina Diaconu (Romania) Andreea Dragoman | (Japan) Hina Hayata (Japan) Miyu Kato | (Hong Kong) Mak Tze Wing (Hong Kong) Minnie Soo Wai Yam |
| 2017 | Riva del Garda | (China) Shi Xunyao (China) Sun Yingsha | (China) Qian Tianyi (China) Wang Manyu | (Japan) Miyu Kato (Japan) Miyu Nagasaki |
| 2017 | Riva del Garda | (China) Shi Xunyao (China) Sun Yingsha | (China) Qian Tianyi (China) Wang Manyu | (Japan) Miyuu Kihara (Japan) Mitsuho Kimura |
| 2018 | Bendigo | (China) Huang Fanzhen (China) Shi Xunyao | (Japan) Miyuu Kihara (Japan) Yumeno Soma | (China) Guo Yuhan (China) Qian Tianyi |
| 2018 | Bendigo | (China) Huang Fanzhen (China) Shi Xunyao | (Japan) Miyuu Kihara (Japan) Yumeno Soma | (Japan) Miyu Nagasaki (Japan) Satsuki Odo |
| 2019 | Korat | (Japan) Miyuu Kihara (Japan) Miyu Nagasaki | (China) Kuai Man (China) Shi Xunyao | (France) Camille Lutz (France) Prithika Pavade |
| 2019 | Korat | (Japan) Miyuu Kihara (Japan) Miyu Nagasaki | (China) Kuai Man (China) Shi Xunyao | (Poland) Anna Wegrzyn (Poland) Katarzyna Wegrzyn |

=== Mixed doubles ===
| Year | Host City | Gold | Silver | Bronze |
|---|---|---|---|---|
| 2003 | Santiago | (China) Zheng Changgong (China) Li Xiaoxia | (China) Ma Long (China) Cao Zhen | (South Korea) Cho Eon-rae (South Korea) Shim Se-rom |
| 2003 | Santiago | (China) Zheng Changgong (China) Li Xiaoxia | (China) Ma Long (China) Cao Zhen | (Japan) Yuichi Tokiyoshi (Japan) Midori Ito |
| 2004 | Kobe | (China) Zhou Bin (China) Liu Shiwen | (China) Ma Long (China) Chang Chenchen | (South Korea) Cho Eon-rae (South Korea) Shim Se-rom |
| 2004 | Kobe | (China) Zhou Bin (China) Liu Shiwen | (China) Ma Long (China) Chang Chenchen | (Japan) Seiya Kishikawa (Japan) Ai Fukuhara |
| 2005 | Linz | (South Korea) Kang Dong-hoon (South Korea) Shim Se-rom | (Serbia and Montenegro) Žolt Pete (Serbia and Montenegro) Gabriela Feher | (Germany) Dimitrij Ovtcharov (Germany) Amelie Solja |
| 2005 | Linz | (South Korea) Kang Dong-hoon (South Korea) Shim Se-rom | (Serbia and Montenegro) Žolt Pete (Serbia and Montenegro) Gabriela Feher | (France) Abdel-Kader Salifou (Romania) Elizabeta Samara |
| 2006 | Cairo | (China) Xu Ke (China) Mu Zi | (China) Jiang Haiyang (China) Wen Jia | (Germany) Ruwen Filus (Germany) Amelie Solja |
| 2006 | Cairo | (China) Xu Ke (China) Mu Zi | (China) Jiang Haiyang (China) Wen Jia | (China) Wu Hao (China) Feng Yalan |
| 2007 | Palo Alto | (China) Xu Ruifeng (China) Mu Zi | (China) Song Shichao (China) Li Xiaodan | (Japan) Kenji Matsudaira (Japan) Kasumi Ishikawa |
| 2007 | Palo Alto | (China) Xu Ruifeng (China) Mu Zi | (China) Song Shichao (China) Li Xiaodan | (China) Zhang Shengwunan (China) Yang Yang |
| 2008 | Madrid | (China) Song Hongyuan (China) Cao Lisi | (South Korea) Seo Hyun-deok (South Korea) Song Ma-eum | (China) Cheng Jingqi (China) Wang Daqin |
| 2008 | Madrid | (China) Song Hongyuan (China) Cao Lisi | (South Korea) Seo Hyun-deok (South Korea) Song Ma-eum | (Japan) Kenta Matsudaira (Japan) Kasumi Ishikawa |
| 2009 | Colombia | (China) Fang Bo (China) Gu Yuting | (Hungary) Daniel Kosiba (Hungary) Dora Csilla Madarasz | (South Korea) Jung Young-sik (South Korea) Kim Min-hee |
| 2009 | Colombia | (China) Fang Bo (China) Gu Yuting | (Hungary) Daniel Kosiba (Hungary) Dora Csilla Madarasz | (China) Lin Gaoyuan (China) Chen Meng |
| 2010 | Bratislava | (China) Wu Jiaji (China) Gu Yuting | (China) Lin Gaoyuan (China) Zhu Yuling | (India) Soumyajit Ghosh (Hong Kong) Ng Wing Nam |
| 2010 | Bratislava | (China) Wu Jiaji (China) Gu Yuting | (China) Lin Gaoyuan (China) Zhu Yuling | (China) Zhou Yu (China) Yi Fangxian |
| 2011 | Manama | (China) Song Hongyuan (China) Chen Meng | (China) Zheng Peifeng (China) Gu Yuting | (China) Lin Gaoyuan (China) Zhu Yuling |
| 2011 | Manama | (China) Song Hongyuan (China) Chen Meng | (China) Zheng Peifeng (China) Gu Yuting | (China) Wu Jiaji (China) Gu Ruochen |
| 2012 | Hyderabad | (China) Fan Zhendong (China) Liu Gaoyang | (China) Lin Gaoyuan (China) Gu Ruochen | (Germany) Frederick Jost (Germany) Petrissa Solja |
| 2012 | Hyderabad | (China) Fan Zhendong (China) Liu Gaoyang | (China) Lin Gaoyuan (China) Gu Ruochen | (China) Xu Chenhao (China) Zhu Yuling |
| 2013 | Rabat | (China) Kong Lingxuan (China) Liu Xi | (China) Zhou Qihao (China) Gu Yuting | (Italy) Mutti Leonardo (Croatia) Rakovac Lea |
| 2013 | Rabat | (China) Kong Lingxuan (China) Liu Xi | (China) Zhou Qihao (China) Gu Yuting | (Japan) Asuka Sakai (Japan) Sakura Mori |
| 2014 | Shanghai | (China) Wang Chuqin (China) Chen Xingtong | (China) Lyu Xiang (China) Wang Manyu | (China) Xue Fei (China) Liu Gaoyang |
| 2014 | Shanghai | (China) Wang Chuqin (China) Chen Xingtong | (China) Lyu Xiang (China) Wang Manyu | (China) Yu Ziyang (China) He Zhuojia |
| 2015 | Vendée | (China) Xue Fei (China) Chen Ke | (China) Wang Chuqin (China) Chen Xingtong | (Hong Kong) Ho Kwan Kit (Hong Kong) Minnie Soo Wai Yam |
| 2015 | Vendée | (China) Xue Fei (China) Chen Ke | (China) Wang Chuqin (China) Chen Xingtong | (China) Zhu Cheng (China) Wang Manyu |
| 2016 | Cape Town | (South Korea) Choi Seung-min (South Korea) Kim Ji-ho | (Japan) Yuki Matsuyama (Japan) Hina Hayata | (Slovenia) Darko Jorgic (Serbia) Izabela Lupulesku |
| 2016 | Cape Town | (South Korea) Choi Seung-min (South Korea) Kim Ji-ho | (Japan) Yuki Matsuyama (Japan) Hina Hayata | (China) Xu Haidong (China) Yuan Yuan |
| 2017 | Riva del Garda | (China) Xue Fei (China) Wang Manyu | (South Korea) An Jae-hyun (South Korea) Kim Ji-ho | (Romania) Cristian Pletea (Romania) Adina Diaconu |
| 2017 | Riva del Garda | (China) Xue Fei (China) Wang Manyu | (South Korea) An Jae-hyun (South Korea) Kim Ji-ho | (China) Wang Chuqin (China) Sun Yingsha |
| 2018 | Bendigo | (China) Xu Yingbin (China) Shi Xunyao | (China) Yu Heyi (China) Qian Tianyi | (Chinese Taipei) Feng Yi-hsin (Chinese Taipei) Su Pei-ling |
| 2018 | Bendigo | (China) Xu Yingbin (China) Shi Xunyao | (China) Yu Heyi (China) Qian Tianyi | (China) Xu Haidong (China) Gui Yuhan |
| 2019 | Korat | (Japan) Yukiya Uda (Japan) Miyuu Kihara | (China) Xu Yingbin (China) Shi Xunyao | (China) Liu Yebo (China) Wu Yangchen |
| 2019 | Korat | (Japan) Yukiya Uda (Japan) Miyuu Kihara | (China) Xu Yingbin (China) Shi Xunyao | (China) Xiang Peng (China) Kuai Man |

== Results of team events ==
The tables below are World Junior Table Tennis Championships medalists of team events.

=== Boys' team ===
| Year | Host City | Gold | Silver | Bronze |
|---|---|---|---|---|
| 2003 | Santiago | China | Chinese Taipei | South Korea |
| 2004 | Kobe | China | South Korea | Japan |
| 2005 | Linz | Japan | China | Germany |
| 2006 | Cairo | China | Japan | Germany |
| 2006 | Cairo | China | Japan | Russia |
| 2007 | Palo Alto | China | South Korea | France |
| 2007 | Palo Alto | China | South Korea | Japan |
| 2008 | Madrid | China | South Korea | England |
| 2008 | Madrid | China | South Korea | Japan |
| 2009 | Colombia | China | Germany | Japan |
| 2009 | Colombia | China | Germany | South Korea |
| 2010 | Bratislava | China | Japan | Germany |
| 2010 | Bratislava | China | Japan | South Korea |
| 2011 | Manama | China | Japan | Germany |
| 2011 | Manama | China | Japan | South Korea |
| 2012 | Hyderabad | China | Japan | South Korea |
| 2012 | Hyderabad | China | Japan | France |
| 2013 | Rabat | China | Japan | Poland |
| 2013 | Rabat | China | Japan | France |
| 2014 | Shanghai | China | Japan | Chinese Taipei |
| 2014 | Shanghai | China | Japan | South Korea |
| 2015 | Vendée | China | South Korea | France |
| 2015 | Vendée | China | South Korea | Hong Kong |
| 2016 | Cape Town | Japan | South Korea | Chinese Taipei |
| 2016 | Cape Town | Japan | South Korea | China |
| 2017 | Riva del Garda | China | Japan | South Korea |
| 2017 | Riva del Garda | China | Japan | Romania |
| 2018 | Bendigo | China | Japan | Chinese Taipei |
| 2018 | Bendigo | China | Japan | France |
| 2019 | Korat | China | Chinese Taipei | France |
| 2019 | Korat | China | Chinese Taipei | Japan |

=== Girls' team ===
| Year | Host City | Gold | Silver | Bronze |
|---|---|---|---|---|
| 2003 | Santiago | China | Japan | (Czech Republic) Czech |
| 2004 | Kobe | China | Japan | Romania |
| 2005 | Linz | China | Hungary | Spain |
| 2006 | Cairo | China | Japan | Hungary |
| 2006 | Cairo | China | Japan | Romania |
| 2007 | Palo Alto | China | Romania | Poland |
| 2007 | Palo Alto | China | Romania | South Korea |
| 2008 | Madrid | China | Japan | Germany |
| 2008 | Madrid | China | Japan | South Korea |
| 2009 | Colombia | China | Japan | Hong Kong |
| 2009 | Colombia | China | Japan | South Korea |
| 2010 | Bratislava | Japan | China | Germany |
| 2010 | Bratislava | Japan | China | South Korea |
| 2011 | Manama | China | Japan | Chinese Taipei |
| 2011 | Manama | China | Japan | Hong Kong |
| 2012 | Hyderabad | China | Japan | Germany |
| 2012 | Hyderabad | China | Japan | Hong Kong |
| 2013 | Rabat | China | Japan | Romania |
| 2013 | Rabat | China | Japan | Hong Kong |
| 2014 | Shanghai | China | Japan | Hong Kong |
| 2014 | Shanghai | China | Japan | United States |
| 2015 | Vendée | China | South Korea | United States |
| 2015 | Vendée | China | South Korea | Romania |
| 2016 | Cape Town | Japan | China | Hong Kong |
| 2016 | Cape Town | Japan | China | South Korea |
| 2017 | Riva del Garda | China | Japan | South Korea |
| 2017 | Riva del Garda | China | Japan | Romania |
| 2018 | Bendigo | China | Japan | South Korea |
| 2018 | Bendigo | China | Japan | Russia |
| 2019 | Korat | China | Japan | Chinese Taipei |
| 2019 | Korat | China | Japan | North Korea |
