= Major achievements in table tennis by nation =

This is a list of achievements in major international table tennis events according to gold, silver and bronze medal results obtained by athletes representing different nations. The objective is not to create a combined medal table; the focus is on listing the best positions achieved by athletes in major global events, ranking the countries according to the most podiums accomplished by athletes of these nations. In order to be considered for the making of the list, competitions must be ranked among the highest possible rank (R1) by the International Table Tennis Federation (ITTF); these competitions are: 1) Summer Olympic Games, 2) Youth Olympic Games, 3) World Table Tennis Championships, 4) ITTF World Youth Championships, and 5) Table Tennis World Cup. Masters, as well as Para meets, such as the Para World Championships and the Paralympic Games, were not taken into consideration, as per ITTF guidelines.

== Results ==
The conventions used on this table follow the ITTF guidelines, namely: MS for men's singles, WS for women's singles, MD for men's doubles, WD for women's doubles, XD for mixed doubles, MT for men's team and WT for women's team. The Mixed Team event at the World Cup and the Youth Olympic Games is referred to as XT.

Notes

- A red background indicates that the result was achieved in doubles or mixed team events where each athlete represented a different country. These results are considered valid for both countries and accounted for in the final ranking.
- The table is pre-sorted by total number of medal results. In case of a tie, countries are then compared according to most gold medal results, silver medal results and bronze medal results, respectively. Persisting a tie, equal ranks are given, with countries being listed in alphabetical order.

=== Senior ===
Best international results by nation (1926 – May 2026)
		World Championships							Olympic Games							World Cup						
Rk.	Nation	MS	WS	MD	WD	XD	MT	WT	MS	WS	MD	WD	XD	MT	WT	MS	WS	MD	WD	MT	WT	XT
1	China	1st place, gold medalist(s)	1st place, gold medalist(s)	1st place, gold medalist(s)	1st place, gold medalist(s)	1st place, gold medalist(s)	1st place, gold medalist(s)	1st place, gold medalist(s)	1st place, gold medalist(s)	1st place, gold medalist(s)	1st place, gold medalist(s)	1st place, gold medalist(s)	1st place, gold medalist(s)	1st place, gold medalist(s)	1st place, gold medalist(s)	1st place, gold medalist(s)	1st place, gold medalist(s)		1st place, gold medalist(s)	1st place, gold medalist(s)	1st place, gold medalist(s)	1st place, gold medalist(s)
2	South Korea	2nd place, silver medalist(s)	1st place, gold medalist(s)	2nd place, silver medalist(s)	1st place, gold medalist(s)	1st place, gold medalist(s)	2nd place, silver medalist(s)	1st place, gold medalist(s)	1st place, gold medalist(s)	3rd place, bronze medalist(s)	3rd place, bronze medalist(s)	1st place, gold medalist(s)		2nd place, silver medalist(s)	3rd place, bronze medalist(s)	2nd place, silver medalist(s)	3rd place, bronze medalist(s)	1st place, gold medalist(s)	1st place, gold medalist(s)	1st place, gold medalist(s)	2nd place, silver medalist(s)	2nd place, silver medalist(s)
3	Japan	1st place, gold medalist(s)	1st place, gold medalist(s)	1st place, gold medalist(s)	1st place, gold medalist(s)	1st place, gold medalist(s)	1st place, gold medalist(s)	1st place, gold medalist(s)	3rd place, bronze medalist(s)	3rd place, bronze medalist(s)			1st place, gold medalist(s)	3rd place, bronze medalist(s)	2nd place, silver medalist(s)	2nd place, silver medalist(s)	2nd place, silver medalist(s)			2nd place, silver medalist(s)	2nd place, silver medalist(s)	2nd place, silver medalist(s)
4	Germany	3rd place, bronze medalist(s)	2nd place, silver medalist(s)	2nd place, silver medalist(s)	1st place, gold medalist(s)	2nd place, silver medalist(s)	2nd place, silver medalist(s)	1st place, gold medalist(s)	3rd place, bronze medalist(s)		2nd place, silver medalist(s)			2nd place, silver medalist(s)		1st place, gold medalist(s)	3rd place, bronze medalist(s)	2nd place, silver medalist(s)		2nd place, silver medalist(s)	2nd place, silver medalist(s)	3rd place, bronze medalist(s)
5	Hong Kong	3rd place, bronze medalist(s)	3rd place, bronze medalist(s)	3rd place, bronze medalist(s)	3rd place, bronze medalist(s)	3rd place, bronze medalist(s)	3rd place, bronze medalist(s)	2nd place, silver medalist(s)			2nd place, silver medalist(s)				3rd place, bronze medalist(s)	3rd place, bronze medalist(s)	2nd place, silver medalist(s)		2nd place, silver medalist(s)	2nd place, silver medalist(s)	3rd place, bronze medalist(s)	3rd place, bronze medalist(s)
6	Chinese Taipei	3rd place, bronze medalist(s)	2nd place, silver medalist(s)	1st place, gold medalist(s)		2nd place, silver medalist(s)	3rd place, bronze medalist(s)	2nd place, silver medalist(s)		2nd place, silver medalist(s)			3rd place, bronze medalist(s)			3rd place, bronze medalist(s)	2nd place, silver medalist(s)			2nd place, silver medalist(s)	3rd place, bronze medalist(s)	
7	North Korea		1st place, gold medalist(s)		1st place, gold medalist(s)	1st place, gold medalist(s)	2nd place, silver medalist(s)	2nd place, silver medalist(s)		2nd place, silver medalist(s)		3rd place, bronze medalist(s)					2nd place, silver medalist(s)			3rd place, bronze medalist(s)	2nd place, silver medalist(s)	
8	France	1st place, gold medalist(s)	3rd place, bronze medalist(s)	2nd place, silver medalist(s)		1st place, gold medalist(s)	2nd place, silver medalist(s)	3rd place, bronze medalist(s)	2nd place, silver medalist(s)		3rd place, bronze medalist(s)			3rd place, bronze medalist(s)		1st place, gold medalist(s)				3rd place, bronze medalist(s)		
9	Hungary	1st place, gold medalist(s)	1st place, gold medalist(s)	1st place, gold medalist(s)	1st place, gold medalist(s)	1st place, gold medalist(s)	1st place, gold medalist(s)	2nd place, silver medalist(s)								1st place, gold medalist(s)					3rd place, bronze medalist(s)	
10	Austria	1st place, gold medalist(s)	1st place, gold medalist(s)	1st place, gold medalist(s)	1st place, gold medalist(s)	2nd place, silver medalist(s)	1st place, gold medalist(s)	2nd place, silver medalist(s)								2nd place, silver medalist(s)				2nd place, silver medalist(s)		
11	Czechoslovakia	1st place, gold medalist(s)	1st place, gold medalist(s)	1st place, gold medalist(s)	1st place, gold medalist(s)	1st place, gold medalist(s)	1st place, gold medalist(s)	1st place, gold medalist(s)								3rd place, bronze medalist(s)						
12	England	1st place, gold medalist(s)	2nd place, silver medalist(s)	1st place, gold medalist(s)	1st place, gold medalist(s)	1st place, gold medalist(s)	1st place, gold medalist(s)	1st place, gold medalist(s)												3rd place, bronze medalist(s)		
13	United States	3rd place, bronze medalist(s)	1st place, gold medalist(s)	1st place, gold medalist(s)	2nd place, silver medalist(s)	1st place, gold medalist(s)	1st place, gold medalist(s)	1st place, gold medalist(s)												3rd place, bronze medalist(s)		
14	Romania		1st place, gold medalist(s)	2nd place, silver medalist(s)	1st place, gold medalist(s)	1st place, gold medalist(s)	2nd place, silver medalist(s)	1st place, gold medalist(s)									2nd place, silver medalist(s)				2nd place, silver medalist(s)	
15	Yugoslavia	2nd place, silver medalist(s)		1st place, gold medalist(s)	3rd place, bronze medalist(s)	2nd place, silver medalist(s)	2nd place, silver medalist(s)				2nd place, silver medalist(s)	3rd place, bronze medalist(s)						3rd place, bronze medalist(s)				
16	Sweden	1st place, gold medalist(s)		1st place, gold medalist(s)		3rd place, bronze medalist(s)	1st place, gold medalist(s)		1st place, gold medalist(s)							1st place, gold medalist(s)				1st place, gold medalist(s)		
17	Singapore				3rd place, bronze medalist(s)			1st place, gold medalist(s)		3rd place, bronze medalist(s)					2nd place, silver medalist(s)		3rd place, bronze medalist(s)				2nd place, silver medalist(s)	
18	Poland	2nd place, silver medalist(s)		2nd place, silver medalist(s)	3rd place, bronze medalist(s)		3rd place, bronze medalist(s)									1st place, gold medalist(s)		3rd place, bronze medalist(s)				
19	Soviet Union		3rd place, bronze medalist(s)	2nd place, silver medalist(s)	1st place, gold medalist(s)	1st place, gold medalist(s)		1st place, gold medalist(s)														
20	Belgium	2nd place, silver medalist(s)			3rd place, bronze medalist(s)		2nd place, silver medalist(s)									2nd place, silver medalist(s)				3rd place, bronze medalist(s)		
21	West Germany	2nd place, silver medalist(s)		1st place, gold medalist(s)		3rd place, bronze medalist(s)	2nd place, silver medalist(s)															
22	Belarus	2nd place, silver medalist(s)		2nd place, silver medalist(s)				3rd place, bronze medalist(s)								1st place, gold medalist(s)						
23	Korea	3rd place, bronze medalist(s)	2nd place, silver medalist(s)			3rd place, bronze medalist(s)		1st place, gold medalist(s)														
24	Croatia	3rd place, bronze medalist(s)	3rd place, bronze medalist(s)	2nd place, silver medalist(s)												1st place, gold medalist(s)						
25	Egypt		3rd place, bronze medalist(s)		3rd place, bronze medalist(s)	3rd place, bronze medalist(s)														3rd place, bronze medalist(s)		
26	Wales		2nd place, silver medalist(s)	3rd place, bronze medalist(s)				3rd place, bronze medalist(s)														
27	Greece	3rd place, bronze medalist(s)				3rd place, bronze medalist(s)										2nd place, silver medalist(s)						
28	Brazil	2nd place, silver medalist(s)														1st place, gold medalist(s)						
28	Russia																	2nd place, silver medalist(s)			1st place, gold medalist(s)	
30	Scotland				1st place, gold medalist(s)	2nd place, silver medalist(s)																
31	East Germany	3rd place, bronze medalist(s)	2nd place, silver medalist(s)																			
32	Luxembourg			2nd place, silver medalist(s)	3rd place, bronze medalist(s)																	
32	Spain			2nd place, silver medalist(s)													3rd place, bronze medalist(s)					
34	Denmark	3rd place, bronze medalist(s)									3rd place, bronze medalist(s)											
34	India	3rd place, bronze medalist(s)					3rd place, bronze medalist(s)															
34	Portugal			3rd place, bronze medalist(s)																3rd place, bronze medalist(s)		
37	Netherlands				3rd place, bronze medalist(s)																3rd place, bronze medalist(s)	
38	Canada															3rd place, bronze medalist(s)						
38	Italy						3rd place, bronze medalist(s)															
40	New Zealand																3rd place, bronze medalist(s)					
40	Vietnam						3rd place, bronze medalist(s)															

=== Junior and Youth ===
Best international results by nation (2003 – May 2025)
		Youth Olympics			World Junior Championships (U18)						
Rk.	Nation	MS	WS	XT	MS	WS	MD	WD	XD	MT	WT
1	China	1st place, gold medalist(s)	1st place, gold medalist(s)	1st place, gold medalist(s)	1st place, gold medalist(s)	1st place, gold medalist(s)	1st place, gold medalist(s)	1st place, gold medalist(s)	1st place, gold medalist(s)	1st place, gold medalist(s)	1st place, gold medalist(s)
2	Japan	1st place, gold medalist(s)	2nd place, silver medalist(s)	1st place, gold medalist(s)	1st place, gold medalist(s)	1st place, gold medalist(s)	1st place, gold medalist(s)	1st place, gold medalist(s)	1st place, gold medalist(s)	1st place, gold medalist(s)	1st place, gold medalist(s)
3	South Korea		3rd place, bronze medalist(s)	2nd place, silver medalist(s)	1st place, gold medalist(s)	3rd place, bronze medalist(s)	1st place, gold medalist(s)	2nd place, silver medalist(s)	1st place, gold medalist(s)	2nd place, silver medalist(s)	2nd place, silver medalist(s)
4	Chinese Taipei	2nd place, silver medalist(s)		3rd place, bronze medalist(s)	1st place, gold medalist(s)	3rd place, bronze medalist(s)	1st place, gold medalist(s)	3rd place, bronze medalist(s)	3rd place, bronze medalist(s)	2nd place, silver medalist(s)	3rd place, bronze medalist(s)
5	Hong Kong		2nd place, silver medalist(s)	3rd place, bronze medalist(s)	3rd place, bronze medalist(s)	2nd place, silver medalist(s)	3rd place, bronze medalist(s)	3rd place, bronze medalist(s)	3rd place, bronze medalist(s)	3rd place, bronze medalist(s)	3rd place, bronze medalist(s)
6	Germany				1st place, gold medalist(s)	2nd place, silver medalist(s)	3rd place, bronze medalist(s)	3rd place, bronze medalist(s)	3rd place, bronze medalist(s)	2nd place, silver medalist(s)	3rd place, bronze medalist(s)
7	Romania		3rd place, bronze medalist(s)		3rd place, bronze medalist(s)	3rd place, bronze medalist(s)	3rd place, bronze medalist(s)	1st place, gold medalist(s)	3rd place, bronze medalist(s)		2nd place, silver medalist(s)
8	France	3rd place, bronze medalist(s)			3rd place, bronze medalist(s)		2nd place, silver medalist(s)	3rd place, bronze medalist(s)	3rd place, bronze medalist(s)	3rd place, bronze medalist(s)	
9	Russia				3rd place, bronze medalist(s)		2nd place, silver medalist(s)			3rd place, bronze medalist(s)	3rd place, bronze medalist(s)
10	Poland							3rd place, bronze medalist(s)		3rd place, bronze medalist(s)	3rd place, bronze medalist(s)
10	United States	3rd place, bronze medalist(s)	3rd place, bronze medalist(s)								3rd place, bronze medalist(s)
12	Hungary								2nd place, silver medalist(s)		2nd place, silver medalist(s)
12	Serbia and Montenegro							2nd place, silver medalist(s)	2nd place, silver medalist(s)		
14	England				2nd place, silver medalist(s)					3rd place, bronze medalist(s)	
14	North Korea					3rd place, bronze medalist(s)		2nd place, silver medalist(s)			
14	Singapore	2nd place, silver medalist(s)				3rd place, bronze medalist(s)					
14	Spain							2nd place, silver medalist(s)			3rd place, bronze medalist(s)
18	Croatia						3rd place, bronze medalist(s)	3rd place, bronze medalist(s)			
18	Serbia							3rd place, bronze medalist(s)	3rd place, bronze medalist(s)		
20	Portugal						2nd place, silver medalist(s)				
20	Sweden				2nd place, silver medalist(s)						
22	Brazil	3rd place, bronze medalist(s)									
22	Canada						3rd place, bronze medalist(s)				
22	Czech Republic										3rd place, bronze medalist(s)
25	India								3rd place, bronze medalist(s)		
25	Italy								3rd place, bronze medalist(s)		
25	Slovenia								3rd place, bronze medalist(s)		
25	Tunisia^{1}			3rd place, bronze medalist(s)							

^{1} The medal was officially awarded under the Olympic flag at the 2010 Summer Youth Olympics to a Mixed-NOCs team consisting of one athlete from China and one athlete from Tunisia.

== See also ==
Major tournaments for disabled athletes

- Table tennis at the Summer Paralympics
- World Para Table Tennis Championships

Other major world tournaments

- List of ITTF World Tour Grand Finals medalists
- Table tennis at the Summer Universiade

Continental tournaments

- Asian Table Tennis Championships
- Table tennis at the Asian Games
- European Table Tennis Championships
- Table tennis at the 2015 European Games
- Table tennis at the Pan American Games

Achievements in sports

- List of major achievements in sports by nation
