= 2015 Asian Junior and Cadet Table Tennis Championships =

Tournament details
- Dates: 22–26 July 2015
- Edition: 21st
- Venue: Gymnasium 2, National Sports Complex
- Location: Bukit Jalil, Kuala Lumpur, Malaysia

The 2015 Milo Asian Junior and Cadet Table Tennis Championships were held in Kuala Lumpur, Malaysia, from 22 to 26 July 2015. It was organised by the Table Tennis Association of Malaysia under the authority of the Asian Table Tennis Union (ATTU).

== Medal summary ==
=== Events ===
Event	Gold	Silver	Bronze
Junior boys' singles	China; Xue Fei	China; Liu Dingshuo	South Korea; Cho Seungmin
Junior boys' singles	China; Xue Fei	China; Liu Dingshuo	Japan; Kohei Sambe
Junior girls' singles	China; Chen Xingtong	China; Chen Ke	China; Wang Yidi
Junior girls' singles	China; Chen Xingtong	China; Chen Ke	China; Wang Manyu
Junior boys' doubles	China; Liu Dingshuo; Zhu Cheng	South Korea; Cho Seungmin; An Jaehyun	Japan; Kohei Sambe; Yuto Kizukuri
Junior boys' doubles	China; Liu Dingshuo; Zhu Cheng	South Korea; Cho Seungmin; An Jaehyun	Japan; Mizuki Oikawa; Tonin Ryuzaki
Junior girls' doubles	China; Wang Manyu; Chen Ke	China; Chen Xingtong; Wang Yidi	South Korea; An Yeongeun; Park Seri
Junior girls' doubles	China; Wang Manyu; Chen Ke	China; Chen Xingtong; Wang Yidi	Japan; Hitomi Sato; Hina Hayata
Junior mixed doubles	China; Zhu Cheng; Wang Manyu	China; Xue Fei; Chen Ke	South Korea; An Jaehyun; Park Seri
Junior mixed doubles	China; Zhu Cheng; Wang Manyu	China; Xue Fei; Chen Ke	Thailand; Sirawit Puangthip; Orawan Paranang
Junior boys' team	China; Liu Dingshuo; Xue Fei; Wang Chuqin; Zhu Cheng	South Korea; Cho Seungmin; An Jaehyun; Park Jeongwoo; Lee Jangmok	Japan; Kohei Sambe; Mizuki Oikawa; Tonin Ryuzaki; Yuto Kizukuri
Junior boys' team	China; Liu Dingshuo; Xue Fei; Wang Chuqin; Zhu Cheng	South Korea; Cho Seungmin; An Jaehyun; Park Jeongwoo; Lee Jangmok	Hong Kong; Ho Kwan Kit; Kwan Man Ho; Hung Ka Tak; Lee Yat Hin
Junior girls' team	China; Chen Xingtong; Wang Yidi; Wang Manyu; Chen Ke	Japan; Hitomi Sato; Hina Hayata; Miyu Kato; Yui Hamamoto	South Korea; Kim Jiho; An Yeongeun; Kang Dayeon; Park Seri
Junior girls' team	China; Chen Xingtong; Wang Yidi; Wang Manyu; Chen Ke	Japan; Hitomi Sato; Hina Hayata; Miyu Kato; Yui Hamamoto	Hong Kong; Mak Tze Wing; Soo Wai Yam Minnie; Liu Qi; Chan Wan Tung Wharton
Cadet boys' singles	China; Peng Feilong	China; Yang Shuo	South Korea; Song Junhyun
Cadet boys' singles	China; Peng Feilong	China; Yang Shuo	Japan; Koyo Kanamitsu
Cadet girls' singles	China; Qian Tianyi	China; Sun Yingsha	Japan; Maki Shiomi
Cadet girls' singles	China; Qian Tianyi	China; Sun Yingsha	North Korea; Ko Un Gum
Cadet boys' team	China; Xu Yingbin; Peng Feilong; Yang Shuo	South Korea; Oh Minseo; Kwon Ojin; Song Junhyun	Japan; Koyo Kanamitsu; Yukiya Uda; Yuta Tanaka
Cadet boys' team	China; Xu Yingbin; Peng Feilong; Yang Shuo	South Korea; Oh Minseo; Kwon Ojin; Song Junhyun	Chinese Taipei; Lin Yun-Ju; Lin Yung-Chih; Wang Chien-Chih
Cadet girls' team	China; Sun Yingsha; Qian Tianyi; Huang Fanzhen	North Korea; Pyon Song Gyong; Ko Un Gum	Japan; Maki Shiomi; Yuka Minagawa; Miyu Nagasaki
Cadet girls' team	China; Sun Yingsha; Qian Tianyi; Huang Fanzhen	North Korea; Pyon Song Gyong; Ko Un Gum	Hong Kong; Lee Ka Yee Karisa; Leung Ka Wan; Ng Ka Man

=== Medal table ===
Rank	Nation	Gold	Silver	Bronze	Total
1	China	11	6	2	19
2	South Korea	0	3	5	8
3	Japan	0	1	9	10
4	North Korea	0	1	1	2
5	Hong Kong	0	0	3	3
6	Chinese Taipei	0	0	1	1
6	Thailand	0	0	1	1
Totals (7 entries)		11	11	22	44

== See also ==
- 2015 World Junior Table Tennis Championships
- Asian Table Tennis Championships
- Asian Table Tennis Union
