= 2014 World Junior Table Tennis Championships =

Table tennis tournament in China

Tournament details
- Dates: 30 November – 7 December 2014
- Edition: 12th
- Venue: Minhang Gymnasium
- Location: Shanghai, China

The 2014 World Junior Table Tennis Championships were held in Shanghai, China, from 30 November to 7 December 2014. It was organised by the Chinese Table Tennis Association under the auspices and authority of the International Table Tennis Federation (ITTF).

== Medal summary ==
=== Events ===
Event	Gold	Silver	Bronze
Boys' singles	China; Yu Ziyang	Japan; Yuto Muramatsu	China; Liu Dingshuo
Boys' singles	China; Yu Ziyang	Japan; Yuto Muramatsu	China; Xue Fei
Girls' singles	China; Wang Manyu	China; Zhu Chaohui	China; Chen Ke
Girls' singles	China; Wang Manyu	China; Zhu Chaohui	China; He Zhuojia
Boys' doubles	China; Lyu Xiang; Xue Fei	South Korea; Cho Seungmin; Kim Minhyeok	China; Liu Dingshuo; Wang Chuqin
Boys' doubles	China; Lyu Xiang; Xue Fei	South Korea; Cho Seungmin; Kim Minhyeok	Chinese Taipei; Peng Wang-Wei; Wang Tai-wei
Girls' doubles	China; Chen Xingtong; Liu Gaoyang	Japan; Miu Hirano; Mima Ito	China; He Zhuojia; Zhu Chaohui
Girls' doubles	China; Chen Xingtong; Liu Gaoyang	Japan; Miu Hirano; Mima Ito	South Korea; Ji Eunchae; Lee Zion
Mixed doubles	China; Wang Chuqin; Chen Xingtong	China; Lyu Xiang; Wang Manyu	China; Xue Fei; Liu Gaoyang
Mixed doubles	China; Wang Chuqin; Chen Xingtong	China; Lyu Xiang; Wang Manyu	China; Yu Ziyang; He Zhuojia
Boys' team	China; Wang Chuqin; Liang Jingkun; Yu Ziyang; Lyu Xiang	Japan; Asuka Sakai; Yuma Tsuboi; Yuto Muramatsu; Kazuhiro Yoshimura	Chinese Taipei; Wang Tai-Wei; Yang Heng-Wei; Lin Hsueh-Yu; Peng Wang-Wei
Boys' team	China; Wang Chuqin; Liang Jingkun; Yu Ziyang; Lyu Xiang	Japan; Asuka Sakai; Yuma Tsuboi; Yuto Muramatsu; Kazuhiro Yoshimura	South Korea; Park Ganghyeon; Kim Minhyeok; Lee Jangmok; Cho Seungmin
Girls' team	China; Wang Manyu; Chen Xingtong; Liu Gaoyang; Chen Ke	Japan; Hitomi Sato; Miu Hirano; Miyu Maeda; Mima Ito	Hong Kong; Soo Wai Yam Minnie; Lam Yee Lok; Doo Hoi Kem; Liu Qi
Girls' team	China; Wang Manyu; Chen Xingtong; Liu Gaoyang; Chen Ke	Japan; Hitomi Sato; Miu Hirano; Miyu Maeda; Mima Ito	United States; Prachi Jha; Lily Zhang; Angela Guan; Crystal Wang

=== Medal table ===
* Host nation (China)

Rank	Nation	Gold	Silver	Bronze	Total
1	China*	7	2	8	17
2	Japan	0	4	0	4
3	South Korea	0	1	2	3
4	Chinese Taipei	0	0	2	2
5	Hong Kong	0	0	1	1
5	United States	0	0	1	1
Totals (6 entries)		7	7	14	28

== See also ==
- 2014 World Team Table Tennis Championships
