= 2018 Austrian Open (table tennis) =

Tournament details
- Dates: 8–11 November 2018
- Competitors: 32S / 16D
- Total prize money: US$251,000
- Venue: TipsArena Linz
- Location: Linz, Austria

Champions
- Men's singles: (China) Liang Jingkun
- Women's singles: (China) Chen Meng
- Men's doubles: (Japan) Yuya Oshima (Japan) Masataka Morizono
- Women's doubles: (Japan) Mima Ito (Japan) Hina Hayata
- Mixed doubles: (China) Xu Xin (China) Liu Shiwen

The 2018 Austrian Open was the twelfth event of the 2018 ITTF World Tour. The event was organised by the Austrian Table Tennis Association, under the authority of the International Table Tennis Federation (ITTF). It was the last Platinum event on the tour, and took place from 8–11 November in Linz, Austria.

== Men's singles ==
=== Seeds ===
1. (China) Fan Zhendong (semifinals)
2. (China) Xu Xin (final)
3. (Germany) Timo Boll (quarterfinals)
4. (Germany) Dimitrij Ovtcharov (first round)
5. (China) Lin Gaoyuan (first round)
6. (China) Ma Long (Injured, first round)
7. (South Korea) Lee Sang-su (first round)
8. (Japan) Tomokazu Harimoto (quarterfinals)
9. (Hong Kong) Wong Chun Ting (first round)
10. (Japan) Koki Niwa (quarterfinals)
11. (Brazil) Hugo Calderano (quarterfinals)
12. (Japan) Jun Mizutani (second round)
13. (Chinese Taipei) Chuang Chih-yuan (first round)
14. (Portugal) Marcos Freitas (first round)
15. (Austria) Daniel Habesohn (first round)
16. (Austria) Robert Gardos (first round)

=== Draw ===
==== Top half ====
First round
1	(China) Fan Zhendong	11	11	11	7	11
(Italy) Niagol Stoyanov	6	5	1	11	6
(Japan) Jin Ueda	11	11	11	9	11
15	(Austria) Daniel Habesohn	7	7	8	11	7
10	(Japan) Koki Niwa	11	6	12	11	7	11
(China) Zhou Qihao	9	11	10	5	11	9
(Japan) Kazuhiro Yoshimura	2	11	6	11	11	14
5	(China) Lin Gaoyuan	11	6	11	8	6	12
7	(South Korea) Lee Sang-su	2	11	11	11	10	8	9
(South Korea) Jang Woo-jin	11	8	9	9	12	11	11
(South Korea) Park Gang-hyeon	14	9	13	11	4	8	7
11	(Brazil) Hugo Calderano	12	11	11	7	11	11	11
9	(Hong Kong) Wong Chun Ting	9	8	11	11	7	10
(China) Liang Jingkun	11	11	7	8	11	12
(Chinese Taipei) Lin Yun-ju	14	10	12	12	7	11
4	(Germany) Dimitrij Ovtcharov	12	12	10	10	11	7

Second round
1	(China) Fan Zhendong	9	11	11	11	11
(Japan) Jin Ueda	11	4	2	4	4
10	(Japan) Koki Niwa	11	11	11	11
(Japan) Kazuhiro Yoshimura	9	7	6	10
(South Korea) Jang Woo-jin	14	6	8	11	9	11	7
11	(Brazil) Hugo Calderano	12	11	11	9	11	5	11
(China) Liang Jingkun	6	11	10	11	12	11
(Chinese Taipei) Lin Yun-ju	11	8	12	7	10	6

Quarterfinals
1	(China) Fan Zhendong	11	11	8	11	11
10	(Japan) Koki Niwa	8	6	11	5	9
11	(Brazil) Hugo Calderano	5	13	4	9
(China) Liang Jingkun	11	15	11	11

Semifinals
1	(China) Fan Zhendong	12	9	11	7	8	9
(China) Liang Jingkun	10	11	6	11	11	11

==== Bottom half ====
First round
3	(Germany) Timo Boll	11	11	9	3	10	11	13
(Germany) Patrick Franziska	7	8	11	11	12	6	11
(China) Zheng Peifeng	11	7	11	3	7	11	11
13	(Chinese Taipei) Chuang Chih-yuan	9	11	9	11	11	5	6
16	(Austria) Robert Gardos	7	6	11	5	8
(England) Liam Pitchford	11	11	7	11	11
(Japan) Koyo Kanamitsu	w/o
6	(China) Ma Long
8	(Japan) Tomokazu Harimoto	11	11	11	11
(Japan) Maharu Yoshimura	5	6	7	2
(Germany) Ricardo Walther	12	2	11	11	12	6	3
12	(Japan) Jun Mizutani	10	11	7	5	14	11	11
14	(Portugal) Marcos Freitas	11	9	9	11	11	9	7
(India) Sathiyan Gnanasekaran	4	11	11	8	6	11	11
(China) Liu Dingshuo	8	5	5	5
2	(China) Xu Xin	11	11	11	11

Second round
3	(Germany) Timo Boll	10	8	12	12	11	11
(China) Zheng Peifeng	12	11	10	10	3	8
(England) Liam Pitchford	6	11	13	11	11
(Japan) Koyo Kanamitsu	11	3	11	7	8
8	(Japan) Tomokazu Harimoto	11	11	9	11	11
12	(Japan) Jun Mizutani	6	5	11	8	7
(India) Sathiyan Gnanasekaran	1	7	11	2	4
2	(China) Xu Xin	11	11	7	11	11

Quarterfinals
3	(Germany) Timo Boll	6	6	11	11	11	10
(England) Liam Pitchford	11	11	5	8	13	12
8	(Japan) Tomokazu Harimoto	11	15	9	5	12	9
2	(China) Xu Xin	6	17	11	11	10	11

Semifinals
(England) Liam Pitchford	9	7	7	6
2	(China) Xu Xin	11	11	11	11

==== Finals ====
Semifinals								Final
1	(China) Fan Zhendong	12	9	11	7	8	9
	(China) Liang Jingkun	10	11	6	11	11	11		(China) Liang Jingkun	11	4	11	9	13	11	11
	(England) Liam Pitchford	9	7	7	6			2	(China) Xu Xin	5	11	6	11	11	13	2
2	(China) Xu Xin	11	11	11	11

== Women's singles ==
=== Seeds ===
1. (China) Zhu Yuling (semifinals)
2. (China) Ding Ning (quarterfinals)
3. (China) Liu Shiwen (quarterfinals)
4. (Japan) Kasumi Ishikawa (first round)
5. (China) Chen Meng (champion)
6. (China) Wang Manyu (final)
7. (Chinese Taipei) Cheng I-ching (quarterfinals)
8. (Japan) Mima Ito (second round)
9. (Japan) Miu Hirano (second round)
10. (China) Chen Xingtong (second round)
11. (Singapore) Feng Tianwei (second round)
12. (South Korea) Seo Hyo-won (second round)
13. (Hong Kong) Doo Hoi Kem (quarterfinals)
14. (Japan) Hitomi Sato (first round)
15. (Austria) Sofia Polcanova (first round)
16. (Austria) Amelie Solja (first round)

=== Draw ===
==== Top half ====
First round
1	(China) Zhu Yuling	12	12	11	11	11
(Romania) Elizabeta Samara	10	10	13	3	9
(Japan) Honoka Hashimoto	11	11	11	11
16	(Austria) Amelie Solja	3	1	5	5
13	(Hong Kong) Doo Hoi Kem	11	11	9	11	6	13
(Canada) Zhang Mo	5	9	11	5	11	11
(Japan) Miyu Nagasaki	7	11	6	7	7
8	(Japan) Mima Ito	11	1	11	11	11
5	(China) Chen Meng	11	11	5	11	11
(North Korea) Kim Song-i	3	4	11	8	4
(China) Wu Yang	1	8	8	inj
10	(China) Chen Xingtong	11	11	11
14	(Japan) Hitomi Sato	10	11	6	11	10	11	10
(Romania) Bernadette Szőcs	12	8	11	7	12	7	12
(Portugal) Fu Yu	7	7	9	1
3	(China) Liu Shiwen	11	11	11	11

Second round
1	(China) Zhu Yuling	11	8	11	11	12	10	12
(Japan) Honoka Hashimoto	8	11	9	13	10	12	10
13	(Hong Kong) Doo Hoi Kem	9	11	11	7	14	11
8	(Japan) Mima Ito	11	1	2	11	12	8
5	(China) Chen Meng	11	11	11	6	4	7	11
10	(China) Chen Xingtong	6	4	4	11	11	11	5
(Romania) Bernadette Szőcs	3	2	2	11
3	(China) Liu Shiwen	11	11	11	13

Quarterfinals
1	(China) Zhu Yuling	12	11	11	11
13	(Hong Kong) Doo Hoi Kem	14	6	6	4	5
5	(China) Chen Meng	14	12	12	12
3	(China) Liu Shiwen	12	10	10	10

Semifinals
1	(China) Zhu Yuling	9	11	8	8	11	11	6
5	(China) Chen Meng	11	9	11	11	8	7	11

==== Bottom half ====
First round
4	(Japan) Kasumi Ishikawa	5	5	4	3
(China) He Zhuojia	11	11	11	11
(Chinese Taipei) Chen Szu-yu	6	10	11	4	11	9
12	(South Korea) Seo Hyo-won	11	12	6	11	6	11
11	(Singapore) Feng Tianwei	11	11	10	9	12	7	14
(Ukraine) Margaryta Pesotska	8	9	12	11	10	11	12
(Japan) Minami Ando	7	6	11	6	7
7	(Chinese Taipei) Cheng I-ching	11	11	9	11	11
6	(China) Wang Manyu	11	11	14	11	12
(Germany) Petrissa Solja	8	7	16	8	10
(Japan) Hina Hayata	11	6	11	3	11	11	8
9	(Japan) Miu Hirano	6	11	5	11	13	7	11
15	(Austria) Sofia Polcanova	11	3	11	5	4	5
(China) Sun Yingsha	8	11	2	11	11	11
(Singapore) Yu Mengyu	11	5	7	8	7
2	(China) Ding Ning	9	11	11	11	11

Second round
(China) He Zhuojia	11	11	8	8	11	8	11
12	(South Korea) Seo Hyo-won	8	8	11	11	9	11	2
11	(Singapore) Feng Tianwei	11	8	11	7	9	13	6
7	(Chinese Taipei) Cheng I-ching	3	11	5	11	11	11	11
6	(China) Wang Manyu	11	12	12	11	11
9	(Japan) Miu Hirano	5	10	14	7	7
(China) Sun Yingsha	8	8	6	11
2	(China) Ding Ning	11	11	11	13

Quarterfinals
(China) He Zhuojia	11	11	11	11
7	(Chinese Taipei) Cheng I-ching	3	5	7	4
6	(China) Wang Manyu	11	9	2	11	11	6	11
2	(China) Ding Ning	5	11	11	8	6	11	7

Semifinals
(China) He Zhuojia	5	11	7	2	8
6	(China) Wang Manyu	11	9	11	11	11

==== Finals ====
Semifinals									Final
1	(China) Zhu Yuling	9	11	8	8	11	11	6
5	(China) Chen Meng	11	9	11	11	8	7	11	5	(China) Chen Meng	11	11	11	11
	(China) He Zhuojia	5	11	7	2	8			6	(China) Wang Manyu	8	9	4	7
6	(China) Wang Manyu	11	9	11	11	11

== Men's doubles ==
=== Seeds ===
1. (South Korea) Jeoung Young-sik / Lee Sang-su (final)
2. (Japan) Masataka Morizono / Yuya Oshima (champions)
3. (Hong Kong) Ho Kwan Kit / Wong Chun Ting (semifinals)
4. (Germany) Patrick Franziska / (Denmark) Jonathan Groth (first round)
5. (China) Fan Zhendong / Wang Chuqin (quarterfinals)
6. (Chinese Taipei) Liao Cheng-ting / Lin Yun-ju (quarterfinals)
7. (Sweden) Mattias Falck / Kristian Karlsson (first round)
8. (Austria) Robert Gardos / Daniel Habesohn (first round)

=== Draw ===
First round
1	(South Korea) Jeoung / Lee	11	11	11
(India) Kamal / Gnanasekaran	7	8	5
(Chinese Taipei) Chen / Chuang	3	5	10
5	(China) Fan / Wang	11	11	11
8	(Austria) Gardos / Habesohn	8	5	11
(Japan) Harimoto / Kizukuri	11	11	13
(Hungary) Ecseki / Szudi	8	14	11	8	4
3	(Hong Kong) Ho / Wong	11	12	5	11	11
4	(Germany) Franziska / (Denmark) Groth
(Belgium) Allegro / Lambiet	w/o
(Romania) Ionescu / (Spain) Robles	w/o
7	(Sweden) Falck / Karlsson
6	(Chinese Taipei) Liao / Lin	11	11	11
(Brazil) Jouti / Tsuboi	9	9	7
(Romania) Pletea / Szőcs	5	2	4
2	(Japan) Morizono / Oshima	11	11	11

Quarterfinals
1	(South Korea) Jeoung / Lee	11	15	11
5	(China) Fan / Wang	9	13	4
(Japan) Harimoto / Kizukuri	10	11	8	9
3	(Hong Kong) Ho / Wong	12	7	11	11
(Belgium) Allegro / Lambiet	11	9	4	11	5
(Romania) Ionescu / (Spain) Robles	6	11	11	8	11
6	(Chinese Taipei) Liao / Lin	6	9	11	3
2	(Japan) Morizono / Oshima	11	11	7	11

Semifinals
1	(South Korea) Jeoung / Lee	11	11	11
3	(Hong Kong) Ho / Wong	7	9	4
(Romania) Ionescu / (Spain) Robles	11	11	5	7
2	(Japan) Morizono / Oshima	3	13	11	11

Final
1	(South Korea) Jeoung / Lee	10	9	11	4
2	(Japan) Morizono / Oshima	12	11	3	11

== Women's doubles ==
=== Seeds ===
1. (Japan) Hina Hayata / Mima Ito (champions)
2. (South Korea) Jeon Ji-hee / Yang Ha-eun (semifinals)
3. (Hong Kong) Doo Hoi Kem / Lee Ho Ching (quarterfinals)
4. (Hong Kong) Ng Wing Nam / Soo Wai Yam Minnie (first round)
5. (China) Chen Xingtong / Sun Yingsha (final)
6. (Slovakia) Barbora Balážová / (Czech Republic) Hana Matelová (quarterfinals)
7. (Chinese Taipei) Cheng Hsien-tzu / Liu Hsing-yin (first round)
8. (Russia) Yana Noskova / (Austria) Sofia Polcanova (first round)

=== Draw ===
First round
1	(Japan) Hayata / Ito	11	11	11
(Hungary) Madarász / Pergel	3	7	8
(Poland) Grzybowska / Partyka	11	8	11	11
7	(Chinese Taipei) Cheng / Lin	4	11	4	8
6	(Slovakia) Balážová / (Czech Republic) Matelová	12	10	11	11	12
(India) Batra / Kamath	10	12	13	9	10
(China) Liu / Zhang	12	7	11	11
4	(Hong Kong) Ng / Soo	10	11	7	8
3	(Hong Kong) Doo / Lee	11	11	7	11
(Germany) Lang / Mittelham	5	8	11	6
(Sweden) Ekholm / (Hungary) Póta	9	11	2	9
5	(China) Chen / Sun	13	9	11	11
8	(Russia) Noskova / (Austria) Polcanova	11	11	8	11	5
(Romania) Samara / Szőcs	9	13	11	7	11
(Germany) Solja / Winter	4	9	6
2	(South Korea) Jeon / Yang	11	11	11

Quarterfinals
1	(Japan) Hayata / Ito	11	11	11
(Poland) Grzybowska / Partyka	6	9	4
6	(Slovakia) Balážová / (Czech Republic) Matelová	6	9	8
(China) Liu / Zhang	11	11	11
3	(Hong Kong) Doo / Lee	6	2	9
5	(China) Chen / Sun	11	11	11
(Romania) Samara / Szőcs	4	11	9	2
2	(South Korea) Jeon / Yang	11	5	11	11

Semifinals
1	(Japan) Hayata / Ito	11	5	11	11
(China) Liu / Zhang	8	11	9	8
5	(China) Chen / Sun	11	11	11	10	11
2	(South Korea) Jeon / Yang	13	8	4	12	4

Final
1	(Japan) Hayata / Ito	11	11	11
5	(China) Chen / Sun	6	7	8

== Mixed doubles ==
=== Seeds ===
1. (Chinese Taipei) Chen Chien-an / Cheng I-ching (final)
2. (Japan) Maharu Yoshimura / Kasumi Ishikawa (quarterfinals)
3. (Hong Kong) Wong Chun Ting / Doo Hoi Kem (semifinals)
4. (South Korea) Jang Woo-jin / (North Korea) Cha Hyo Sim (semifinals)
5. (Slovakia) Ľubomír Pištej / Barbora Balážová (quarterfinals)
6. (Sweden) Mattias Falck / Matilda Ekholm (first round)
7. (Germany) Ruwen Filus / Han Ying (quarterfinals)
8. (Austria) Stefan Fegerl / Sofia Polcanova (first round)

=== Draw ===
First round
1	(Chinese Taipei) Chen / Cheng	11	11	8	14	12
(Romania) Ionescu / Szőcs	7	13	11	12	10
(Netherlands) Tromer / Eerland	w/o
6	(Sweden) Falck / Ekholm
5	(Slovakia) Pištej / Balážová	11	11	11
(India) Kamal / Batra	9	9	3
(Poland) Dyjas / Partyka	11	4	11	11	9
3	(Hong Kong) Wong / Doo	6	11	11	7	11
4	(South Korea) Jang / (North Korea) Cha	11	6	11	11
(Belgium) Nuytinck / Lung	5	11	7	7
(Hungary) Szudi / Pergel	5	11	10	11	4
7	(Germany) Filus / Han	11	9	12	9	11
8	(Austria) Fegerl / Polcanova	6	11	6	6
(China) Xu / Liu	11	8	11	11
(Portugal) Apolónia / Shao	9	3	6
2	(Japan) Yoshimura / Ishikawa	11	11	11

Quarterfinals
1	(Chinese Taipei) Chen / Cheng	7	13	11	11
(Netherlands) Tromer / Eerland	11	11	9	8
5	(Slovakia) Pištej / Balážová	11	9	2	4
3	(Hong Kong) Wong / Doo	7	11	11	11
4	(South Korea) Jang / (North Korea) Cha	11	6	11	11
7	(Germany) Filus / Han	5	11	9	9
(China) Xu / Liu	8	11	11	11
2	(Japan) Yoshimura / Ishikawa	11	8	5	9

Semifinals
1	(Chinese Taipei) Chen / Cheng	8	11	11	8	11
3	(Hong Kong) Wong / Doo	11	6	9	11	9
4	(South Korea) Jang / (North Korea) Cha	5	10	7
(China) Xu / Liu	11	12	11

Final
1	(Chinese Taipei) Chen / Cheng	11	6	9	12	5
(China) Xu / Liu	9	11	11	10	11
