= Austrian Open =

Austrian Open may refer to:

- Austrian International, a badminton tournament.
- Austrian Open (tennis)
- Austrian Open (golf)
- Austrian Open (snooker)
- Austrian Open (table tennis), latest being 2018 Austrian Open (table tennis)
