= 2013 World Junior Table Tennis Championships =

Table tennis tournament in Morocco

Tournament details
- Dates: 1–8 December 2013
- Edition: 11th
- Venue: Prince Moulay Abdellah Stadium
- Location: Rabat, Morocco

The 2013 World Junior Table Tennis Championships were held in Rabat, Morocco, from 1 to 8 December 2013. It was organised by the Fédération Royale Marocaine de Tennis de Table (FRMTT) under the auspices and authority of the International Table Tennis Federation (ITTF).

== Medal summary ==
=== Events ===
Event	Gold	Silver	Bronze
Boys' singles	South Korea; Jang Woojin	China; Zhou Kai	China; Kong Lingxuan
Boys' singles	South Korea; Jang Woojin	China; Zhou Kai	Japan; Masataka Morizono
Girls' singles	China; Gu Yuting	China; Liu Gaoyang	China; Liu Xi
Girls' singles	China; Gu Yuting	China; Liu Gaoyang	China; Wang Manyu
Boys' doubles	China; Kong Lingxuan; Zhou Qihao	South Korea; Jang Woojin; Park Chan-Hyeok	China; Liang Jingkun; Zhou Kai
Boys' doubles	China; Kong Lingxuan; Zhou Qihao	South Korea; Jang Woojin; Park Chan-Hyeok	France; Angles Enzo; Flore Tristan
Girls' doubles	China; Gu Yuting; Liu Xi	China; Liu Gaoyang; Wang Manyu	Serbia; Aneta Maksuti; Viktoria Tružinski
Girls' doubles	China; Gu Yuting; Liu Xi	China; Liu Gaoyang; Wang Manyu	South Korea; Jung Yumi; Lee Dasom
Mixed doubles	China; Kong Lingxuan; Liu Xi	China; Zhou Qihao; Gu Yuting	Japan; Asuka Sakai; Sakura Mori
Mixed doubles	China; Kong Lingxuan; Liu Xi	China; Zhou Qihao; Gu Yuting	(Italy) Mutti Leonardo (Croatia) Rakovac Lea
Boys' team	China; Kong Lingxuan; Liang Jingkun; Zhou Qihao; Zhou Kai	Japan; Asuka Sakai; Masataka Morizono; Kohei Sambe; Yuto Muramatsu	France; Enzo Angles; Tristan Flore; Alexandre Robinot; Mehdi Bouloussa
Boys' team	China; Kong Lingxuan; Liang Jingkun; Zhou Qihao; Zhou Kai	Japan; Asuka Sakai; Masataka Morizono; Kohei Sambe; Yuto Muramatsu	Poland; Adrian Wiecek; Jakub Dyjas; Patryk Zatowka; Michal Bankosz
Girls' team	China; Wang Manyu; Gu Yuting; Liu Gaoyang; Liu Xi	Japan; Miyu Kato; Miu Hirano; Sakura Mori; Mima Ito	Hong Kong; Soo Wai Yam Minnie; Lam Yee Lok; Doo Hoi Kem; Wong Chung Wan
Girls' team	China; Wang Manyu; Gu Yuting; Liu Gaoyang; Liu Xi	Japan; Miyu Kato; Miu Hirano; Sakura Mori; Mima Ito	Romania; Irina Ciobanu; Bernadette Szocs; Adina Diaconu

=== Medal table ===
Rank	Nation	Gold	Silver	Bronze	Total
1	China	6	4	4	14
2	South Korea	1	1	1	3
3	Japan	0	2	2	4
4	France	0	0	2	2
5	Hong Kong	0	0	1	1
5	Poland	0	0	1	1
5	Romania	0	0	1	1
5	Serbia	0	0	1	1
9	Croatia	0	0	0.5	0.5
9	Italy	0	0	0.5	0.5
Totals (10 entries)		7	7	14	28

== See also ==
- 2013 World Table Tennis Championships
