= 2018 Austrian Open =

2018 Austrian Open may refer to:

- 2018 Austrian Open (table tennis)
- 2018 Austrian Darts Open
