= 2008 World Junior Table Tennis Championships =

Table tennis tournament in Spain

Tournament details
- Dates: 6 – 13 December 2008
- Edition: 6th
- Venue: CDM Francisco Fernandez Ochoa
- Location: Madrid, Spain

The 2008 World Junior Table Tennis Championships were held in Madrid, Spain, from 6 to 13 December 2008. It was organised by the Real Federacion Española de Tenis de Mesa under the auspices and authority of the International Table Tennis Federation (ITTF).

== Medal summary ==
=== Events ===
Event	Gold	Silver	Bronze
Boys' singles	Chinese Taipei; Chen Chien-an	England; Paul Drinkhall	China; Yan An
Boys' singles	Chinese Taipei; Chen Chien-an	England; Paul Drinkhall	South Korea; Lee Sang-su
Girls' singles	China; Cao Lisi	Germany; Amelie Solja	China; Wang Daqin
Girls' singles	China; Cao Lisi	Germany; Amelie Solja	Japan; Ayuka Tanioka
Boys' doubles	China; Yan An; Song Hongyuan	South Korea; Lee Sang-su; Seo Hyun-deok	Japan; Kenta Matsudaira; Koki Niwa
Boys' doubles	China; Yan An; Song Hongyuan	South Korea; Lee Sang-su; Seo Hyun-deok	South Korea; Jung Young-sik; Kim Min-seok
Girls' doubles	China; Cao Lisi; Wang Daqin	South Korea; Kim Min-hee; Lee Hyun	Japan; Kasumi Ishikawa; Misaki Morizono
Girls' doubles	China; Cao Lisi; Wang Daqin	South Korea; Kim Min-hee; Lee Hyun	Japan; Yuko Fujii; Ayuka Tanioka
Mixed doubles	China; Song Hongyuan; Cao Lisi	South Korea; Seo Hyun-deok; Song Ma-eum	China; Cheng Jingqi; Wang Daqin
Mixed doubles	China; Song Hongyuan; Cao Lisi	South Korea; Seo Hyun-deok; Song Ma-eum	Japan; Kenta Matsudaira; Kasumi Ishikawa
Boys' team	China; Fang Bo; Yan An; Cheng Jingqi; Song Hongyuan	South Korea; Jeoung Youngsik; Kim Min-seok; Lee Sang-su; Seo Hyun-deok	England; Paul Drinkhall; Darius Knight; Gavin Evans; Liam Pitchford
Boys' team	China; Fang Bo; Yan An; Cheng Jingqi; Song Hongyuan	South Korea; Jeoung Youngsik; Kim Min-seok; Lee Sang-su; Seo Hyun-deok	Japan; Koki Niwa; Kenta Matsudaira; Kaito Fujimoto; Kohei Morimoto
Girls' team	China; Chen Meng; Wang Daqin; Cao Lisi; Xiong Xinyun	Japan; Misaki Morizono; Kasumi Ishikawa; Yuko Fujii; Ayuka Tanioka	Germany; Petrissa Solja; Amelie Solja; Sabine Winter; Rosalia Stahr
Girls' team	China; Chen Meng; Wang Daqin; Cao Lisi; Xiong Xinyun	Japan; Misaki Morizono; Kasumi Ishikawa; Yuko Fujii; Ayuka Tanioka	South Korea; Lee Hyun; Kim Minhee; Hwang Jina; Song Maeum

=== Medal table ===
Rank	Nation	Gold	Silver	Bronze	Total
1	China	6	0	3	9
2	Chinese Taipei	1	0	0	1
3	South Korea	0	4	3	7
4	Japan	0	1	6	7
5	England	0	1	1	2
5	Germany	0	1	1	2
Totals (6 entries)		7	7	14	28

== See also ==
- 2008 World Team Table Tennis Championships
