= 2003 World Junior Table Tennis Championships =

Table tennis tournament in Chile

Tournament details
- Dates: 14 – 21 December 2003
- Edition: 1st
- Location: Santiago, Chile

The 2003 World Junior Table Tennis Championships were held in Santiago, Chile, from 14 to 21 December 2003. It was organised by the Federación Chilena de Tenis de Mesa under the auspices and authority of the International Table Tennis Federation (ITTF).

== Medal summary ==
=== Events ===
Event	Gold	Silver	Bronze
Boys' singles	China; Li Hu	South Korea; Cho Eon-rae	China; Zheng Changgong
Boys' singles	China; Li Hu	South Korea; Cho Eon-rae	South Korea; Lim Jae-hyun
Girls' singles	China; Li Qian	China; Peng Luyang	China; Cao Zhen
Girls' singles	China; Li Qian	China; Peng Luyang	China; Li Xiaoxia
Boys' doubles	Japan; Seiya Kishikawa; Minoru Muramori	Portugal; Tiago Apolónia; Marcos Freitas	Canada; Bence Csaba; Faazil Kassam
Boys' doubles	Japan; Seiya Kishikawa; Minoru Muramori	Portugal; Tiago Apolónia; Marcos Freitas	China; Zhang Jike; Zheng Changgong
Girls' doubles	China; Li Qian; Li Xiaoxia	Serbia and Montenegro; Gabriela Feher; Eva Tapai	Germany; Gaby Rohr; Meike Rohr
Girls' doubles	China; Li Qian; Li Xiaoxia	Serbia and Montenegro; Gabriela Feher; Eva Tapai	Japan; Ai Fukuhara; Sayaka Hirano
Mixed doubles	China; Zheng Changgong; Li Xiaoxia	China; Ma Long; Cao Zhen	Japan; Yuichi Tokiyoshi; Midori Ito
Mixed doubles	China; Zheng Changgong; Li Xiaoxia	China; Ma Long; Cao Zhen	South Korea; Cho Eon-rae; Shim Se-rom
Boys' team	China; Ma Long; Zhang Jike; Li Hu; Zeng Cem	Germany; Dimitrij Ovtcharov; Patrick Baum; Christian Suss; Benjamin Rosner	South Korea; Lee Jinkwon; Cho Eon-rae; Lim Jaehyun; Donghoon Kang
Girls' team	China; Li Qian; Li Xiaoxia; Cao Zhen; Peng Luyang	Japan; Ai Fukuhara; Sayaka Hirano; Midori Ito; Mari Hanada	Czech Republic; Iveta Vacenovska; Martina Smistikova; Lenka Harabaszova; Katerina Penkavova

=== Medal table ===
Rank	Nation	Gold	Silver	Bronze	Total
1	China	6	2	4	12
2	Japan	1	1	2	4
3	South Korea	0	1	3	4
4	Germany	0	1	1	2
5	Portugal	0	1	0	1
5	Serbia and Montenegro	0	1	0	1
7	Canada	0	0	1	1
7	Czech Republic	0	0	1	1
Totals (8 entries)		7	7	12	26

== See also ==
- 2003 World Table Tennis Championships
