= 2005 World Junior Table Tennis Championships =

Table tennis tournament in Austria

Tournament details
- Dates: 10 – 17 December 2005
- Edition: 3rd
- Location: Linz, Austria

The 2005 World Junior Table Tennis Championships were held in Linz, Austria, from 10 to 17 December 2005. It was organised by the Österreichischer Tischtennis Verband under the auspices and authority of the International Table Tennis Federation (ITTF).

== Medal summary ==
=== Events ===
Event	Gold	Silver	Bronze
Boys' singles	Germany; Patrick Baum	Japan; Jun Mizutani	Chinese Taipei; Huang Sheng-sheng
Boys' singles	Germany; Patrick Baum	Japan; Jun Mizutani	Sweden; Fabian Akerstrom
Girls' singles	China; Ding Ning	China; Peng Xue	Germany; Zhenqi Barthel
Girls' singles	China; Ding Ning	China; Peng Xue	South Korea; Shim Se-rom
Boys' doubles	Chinese Taipei; Chiang Hung-chieh; Huang Sheng-sheng	Russia; Kirill Skachkov; Stanislav Golovanov	Japan; Jun Mizutani; Seiya Kishikawa
Boys' doubles	Chinese Taipei; Chiang Hung-chieh; Huang Sheng-sheng	Russia; Kirill Skachkov; Stanislav Golovanov	South Korea; Kang Dong-hoon; Lee Jin-kwon
Girls' doubles	China; Ding Ning; Peng Xue	Spain; Galia Dvorak; Sara Ramírez	Japan; Yuka Ishigaki; Moemi Terui
Girls' doubles	China; Ding Ning; Peng Xue	Spain; Galia Dvorak; Sara Ramírez	Japan; Shiho Ono; Yuri Yamanashi
Mixed doubles	South Korea; Kang Dong-hoon; Shim Se-rom	Serbia and Montenegro; Žolt Pete; Gabriela Feher	Germany; Dimitrij Ovtcharov; Amelie Solja
Mixed doubles	South Korea; Kang Dong-hoon; Shim Se-rom	Serbia and Montenegro; Žolt Pete; Gabriela Feher	(France) Abdel-Kader Salifou (Romania) Elizabeta Samara
Boys' team	Japan; Jun Mizutani; Seiya Kishikawa; Hidetoshi Oya; Taku Takakiwa	China; Yang Ce; Fang Li; Liu Miao; Shi Lei	Germany; Dimitrij Ovtcharov; Ruwen Filus; Patrick Baum; Steffen Mengel
Girls' team	China; Ding Ning; Peng Xue; Cao Lisi; Liu Kailun	Hungary; Szandra Pergel; Mariann Juhasz; Li Bin; Barbara Barasso	Spain; Sara Ramirez; Galia Dvorak; Anna Badosa; Carmen Solichero

=== Medal table ===
Rank	Nation	Gold	Silver	Bronze	Total
1	China	3	2	0	5
2	Japan	1	1	3	5
3	Germany	1	0	3	4
4	South Korea	1	0	2	3
5	Chinese Taipei	1	0	1	2
6	Spain	0	1	1	2
7	Hungary	0	1	0	1
7	Russia	0	1	0	1
7	Serbia and Montenegro	0	1	0	1
10	Sweden	0	0	1	1
11	France	0	0	0.5	0.5
11	Romania	0	0	0.5	0.5
Totals (12 entries)		7	7	12	26

== See also ==
- 2005 World Table Tennis Championships
