= 2007 World Junior Table Tennis Championships =

Table tennis tournament in United States

Tournament details
- Dates: 8 – 15 December 2007
- Edition: 5th
- Venue: Roscoe Maples Pavilion; Burnham Pavilion/Ford Center
- Location: Palo Alto, United States

The 2007 World Junior Table Tennis Championships were held in Palo Alto, California, U.S. from December 8 to 15, 2007. It was organised by the USA Table Tennis (USATT) under the auspices and authority of the International Table Tennis Federation (ITTF). The competition consisted of seven events: boys' and girls' team, boys' and girls' singles, boys' and girls' doubles, and mixed doubles.

== Medal summary ==
Event	Gold	Silver	Bronze
Boys' singles	South Korea; Jeong Sang-Eun	China; Xu Ruifeng	Russia; Mikhail Paykov
Boys' singles	South Korea; Jeong Sang-Eun	China; Xu Ruifeng	South Korea; Lee Sang-Su
Girls' singles	China; Yang Yang	China; Wen Jia	China; Mu Zi
Girls' singles	China; Yang Yang	China; Wen Jia	Germany; Amelie Solja
Boys' doubles	China; Yan An; Song Shichao	Japan; Kenji Matsudaira; Jin Ueda	China; Xu Ruifeng; Zhang Shengwunan
Boys' doubles	China; Yan An; Song Shichao	Japan; Kenji Matsudaira; Jin Ueda	Russia; Mikhail Paykov; Artem Utochkin
Girls' doubles	China; Wen Jia; Li Xiaodan	China; Mu Zi; Yang Yang	Japan; Yuka Ishigaki; Misako Wakamiya
Girls' doubles	China; Wen Jia; Li Xiaodan	China; Mu Zi; Yang Yang	Romania; Ioana Ghemes; Elizabeta Samara
Mixed doubles	China; Xu Ruifeng; Mu Zi	China; Song Shichao; Li Xiaodan	China; Zhang Shengwunan; Yang Yang
Mixed doubles	China; Xu Ruifeng; Mu Zi	China; Song Shichao; Li Xiaodan	Japan; Kenji Matsudaira; Kasumi Ishikawa
Boys' team	China; Yan An; Song Shichao; Xu Ruifeng; Zhang Shengwunan	South Korea; Jeong Sang-eun; Lee Sang-Su; Seo Hyun-Deok; Jung Young-Sik	France; Simon Gauzy; Abdel-Kader Salifou; Vincent Baubet; Thomas Le Breton
Boys' team	China; Yan An; Song Shichao; Xu Ruifeng; Zhang Shengwunan	South Korea; Jeong Sang-eun; Lee Sang-Su; Seo Hyun-Deok; Jung Young-Sik	Japan; Kenji Matsudaira; Jin Ueda; Yoshikazu Kai; Kentaro Miuchi
Girls' team	China; Mu Zi; Wen Jia; Yang Yang; Li Xiaodan	Romania; Elizabeta Samara; Ioana Ghemeş; Cristina Hîrîci; Irina Hoza	Poland; Natalia Partyka; Katarzyna Grzybowska; Anna Zak; Natalia Bak
Girls' team	China; Mu Zi; Wen Jia; Yang Yang; Li Xiaodan	Romania; Elizabeta Samara; Ioana Ghemeş; Cristina Hîrîci; Irina Hoza	South Korea; Jang Jung-Min; Choi Jung-Min; Song Ma-Eum; Kim Min-Hee

=== Medal table ===
Rank	Nation	Gold	Silver	Bronze	Total
1	China	6	4	3	13
2	South Korea	1	1	2	4
3	Japan	0	1	3	4
4	Romania	0	1	1	2
5	Russia	0	0	2	2
6	France	0	0	1	1
6	Germany	0	0	1	1
6	Poland	0	0	1	1
Totals (8 entries)		7	7	14	28

== See also ==
- 2007 World Table Tennis Championships
