= Table tennis at the Summer Youth Olympics =

- Governing body: ITTF
- Events: 3 (men: 1; women: 1; mixed: 1)

Games
- 2010; 2014; 2018; 2026

Table tennis was inducted at the Youth Olympic Games at the inaugural edition in 2010. There's one singles event for both boys and girls. Moreover, a mixed-NOC team event is staged every Games.

== Medal summaries ==
=== Boys' singles ===
Games	Gold	Silver	Bronze
2010 Singapore	Koki Niwa; Japan	Hung Tzu-hsiang; Chinese Taipei	Simon Gauzy; France
2014 Nanjing	Fan Zhendong; China	Yuto Muramatsu; Japan	Hugo Calderano; Brazil
2018 Buenos Aires	Wang Chuqin; China	Tomokazu Harimoto; Japan	Kanak Jha; United States
2026 Dakar	Ryuusei Kawakami; Japan	Emanuel Otalvaro; Colombia	Lee Seung-soo; South Korea

=== Girls' singles ===
Games	Gold	Silver	Bronze
2010 Singapore	Gu Yuting; China	Isabelle Li Siyun; Singapore	Yang Ha-Eun; South Korea
2014 Nanjing	Liu Gaoyang; China	Doo Hoi Kem; Hong Kong	Lily Zhang; United States
2018 Buenos Aires	Sun Yingsha; China	Miu Hirano; Japan	Andreea Dragoman; Romania
2026 Dakar	Chen Min-hsin; Chinese Taipei	Loy Ming Ying; Singapore	Su Tsz Tung; Hong Kong

=== Mixed team ===
Games	Gold	Silver	Bronze
2010 Singapore	Japan; Ayuka Tanioka; Koki Niwa	South Korea; Yang Ha-Eun; Kim Dong-Hyun	Intercontinental 1 Gu Yuting (CHN); Adem Hmam (TUN)
2014 Nanjing	China; Liu Gaoyang; Fan Zhendong	Japan; Miyu Kato; Yuto Muramatsu	Hong Kong; Doo Hoi Kem; Hung Ka Tak
2018 Buenos Aires	China; Sun Yingsha; Wang Chuqin	Japan; Miu Hirano; Tomokazu Harimoto	Chinese Taipei; Su Pei-ling; Lin Yun-ju
2026 Dakar	Japan; Ryuusei Kawakami; Miku Matsushima	Hong Kong; Su Tsz Tung; Li Ki Ho	Chinese Taipei; Lin Chin-ting; Chen Min-hsin

== Medal table ==
As of the 2026 Summer Youth Olympics.

Rank	Nation	Gold	Silver	Bronze	Total
1	China	7	0	0	7
2	Japan	4	5	0	9
3	Chinese Taipei	1	1	2	4
4	Hong Kong	0	2	2	4
5	Singapore	0	2	0	2
6	South Korea	0	1	2	3
7	Colombia	0	1	0	1
8	United States	0	0	2	2
9	Brazil	0	0	1	1
9	France	0	0	1	1
9	Romania	0	0	1	1
–	Mixed-NOCs	0	0	1	1
Totals (11 entries)		12	12	12	36

== See also ==
- Table tennis at the Summer Olympics
