= 2019 World Junior Table Tennis Championships =

Table tennis tournament in Thailand

Tournament details
- Dates: 24 November – 1 December 2019
- Edition: 17th
- Venue: Terminal 21 Korat
- Location: Korat, Thailand

The 2019 World Junior Table Tennis Championships were held in Korat, Thailand, from 24 November to 1 December 2019.

== Medal summary ==
=== Events ===
Event	Gold	Silver	Bronze
Boys' singles	China; Xiang Peng	Sweden; Truls Moregard	Chinese Taipei; Feng Yi-hsin
Boys' singles	China; Xiang Peng	Sweden; Truls Moregard	Japan; Shunsuke Togami
Girls' singles	Japan; Miyu Nagasaki	Japan; Haruna Ojio	China; Wu Yangchen
Girls' singles	Japan; Miyu Nagasaki	Japan; Haruna Ojio	North Korea; Kim Un-song
Boys' doubles	China; Liu Yebo; Xu Yingbin	Russia; Vladimir Sidorenko; Artem Tikhonov	China; Xiang Peng; Zeng Beixun
Boys' doubles	China; Liu Yebo; Xu Yingbin	Russia; Vladimir Sidorenko; Artem Tikhonov	Singapore; Josh Shao Han Chua; Yew En Koen Pang
Girls' doubles	Japan; Miyuu Kihara; Miyu Nagasaki	China; Kuai Man; Shi Xunyao	France; Camille Lutz; Prithika Pavade
Girls' doubles	Japan; Miyuu Kihara; Miyu Nagasaki	China; Kuai Man; Shi Xunyao	Poland; Anna Węgrzyn; Katarzyna Węgrzyn
Mixed doubles	Japan; Yukiya Uda; Miyuu Kihara	China; Xu Yingbin; Shi Xunyao	China; Xiang Peng; Kuai Man
Mixed doubles	Japan; Yukiya Uda; Miyuu Kihara	China; Xu Yingbin; Shi Xunyao	China; Liu Yebo; Wu Yangchen
Boys' team	China; Xu Yingbin; Xiang Peng; Liu Yebo; Zeng Beixun	Chinese Taipei; Tai Ming-wei; Huang Yu-jen; Huang Yan-cheng; Feng Yi-hsin	France; Lilian Bardet; Vincent Picard; Alexis Lebrun; Dorian Zheng
Boys' team	China; Xu Yingbin; Xiang Peng; Liu Yebo; Zeng Beixun	Chinese Taipei; Tai Ming-wei; Huang Yu-jen; Huang Yan-cheng; Feng Yi-hsin	Japan; Yukiya Uda; Shunsuke Togami; Hiroto Shinozuka; Kakeru Sone
Girls' team	China; Shi Xunyao; Kuai Man; Chen Yi; Wu Yangchen	Japan; Miyu Nagasaki; Miyuu Kihara; Kyoka Idesawa; Haruna Ojio	Chinese Taipei; Yu Hsiu-ting; Cai Fong-en; Chien Tung-chuan; Lee Wan-hsuan
Girls' team	China; Shi Xunyao; Kuai Man; Chen Yi; Wu Yangchen	Japan; Miyu Nagasaki; Miyuu Kihara; Kyoka Idesawa; Haruna Ojio	North Korea; Kim Kum-yong; Kim Un-song; Pyon Song-gyong

=== Medal table ===
Rank	Nation	Gold	Silver	Bronze	Total
1	China	4	2	4	10
2	Japan	3	2	2	7
3	Chinese Taipei	0	1	2	3
4	Russia	0	1	0	1
4	Sweden	0	1	0	1
6	France	0	0	2	2
6	North Korea	0	0	2	2
8	Poland	0	0	1	1
8	Singapore	0	0	1	1
Totals (9 entries)		7	7	14	28

== See also ==
- 2019 World Table Tennis Championships
- 2019 ITTF World Tour
