= 2018 World Junior Table Tennis Championships =

Table tennis tournament in Australia

Tournament details
- Dates: 2–9 December 2018
- Edition: 16th
- Venue: Bendigo Stadium
- Location: Bendigo, Australia

The 2018 World Junior Table Tennis Championships were held in Bendigo, Australia from 2 to 9 December, 2018.

China completed a clean sweep of gold medals in all seven events, with Xu Haidong winning the boys' singles title and Qian Tianyi securing victory in the girls' singles.

== Medal summary ==
=== Events ===
Event	Gold	Silver	Bronze
Boys' singles	China; Xu Haidong	Japan; Yukiya Uda	China; Xiang Peng
Boys' singles	China; Xu Haidong	Japan; Yukiya Uda	Romania; Cristian Pletea
Girls' singles	China; Qian Tianyi	China; Shi Xunyao	Chinese Taipei; Su Pei-Ling
Girls' singles	China; Qian Tianyi	China; Shi Xunyao	Japan; Yumeno Soma
Boys' doubles	China; Xu Haidong; Xiang Peng	Russia; Maksim Grebnev; Lev Katsman	France; Irvin Bertrand; Leo de Nodrest
Boys' doubles	China; Xu Haidong; Xiang Peng	Russia; Maksim Grebnev; Lev Katsman	Chinese Taipei; Feng Yi-hsin; Li Hsin-yang
Girls' doubles	China; Huang Fanzhen; Shi Xunyao	Japan; Miyuu Kihara; Yumeno Soma	China; Guo Yuhan; Qian Tianyi
Girls' doubles	China; Huang Fanzhen; Shi Xunyao	Japan; Miyuu Kihara; Yumeno Soma	Japan; Satsuki Odo; Miyu Nagasaki
Mixed doubles	China; Xu Yingbin; Shi Xunyao	China; Yu Heyi; Qian Tianyi	China; Xu Haidong; Guo Yuhan
Mixed doubles	China; Xu Yingbin; Shi Xunyao	China; Yu Heyi; Qian Tianyi	Chinese Taipei; Feng Yi-hsin; Su Pei-Ling
Boys' team	China; Xu Haidong; Xiang Peng; Xu Yingbin; Yu Heyi	Japan; Shunsuke Togami; Yuta Tanaka; Yukiya Uda; Kakeru Sone	Chinese Taipei; Feng Yi-hsin; Li Hsin-yang; Lin Yung-chih; Tai Ming-wei
Boys' team	China; Xu Haidong; Xiang Peng; Xu Yingbin; Yu Heyi	Japan; Shunsuke Togami; Yuta Tanaka; Yukiya Uda; Kakeru Sone	France; Lilian Bardet; Irvin Bertrand; Leo de Nodrest; Bastien Rembert
Girls' team	China; Guo Yuhan; Huang Fanzhen; Qian Tianyi; Shi Xunyao	Japan; Satsuki Odo; Miyu Nagasaki; Miyuu Kihara; Yumeno Soma	Russia; Mariia Tailakova; Anastasia Kolish; Kristina Kazantseva; Ekaterina Zironova
Girls' team	China; Guo Yuhan; Huang Fanzhen; Qian Tianyi; Shi Xunyao	Japan; Satsuki Odo; Miyu Nagasaki; Miyuu Kihara; Yumeno Soma	South Korea; Choi Hae-eun; Ryu Han-na; Shin Yu-bin; Wee Ye-ji

=== Medal table ===
Rank	Nation	Gold	Silver	Bronze	Total
1	China	7	2	3	12
2	Japan	0	4	2	6
3	Russia	0	1	1	2
4	Chinese Taipei	0	0	4	4
5	France	0	0	2	2
6	Romania	0	0	1	1
6	South Korea	0	0	1	1
Totals (7 entries)		7	7	14	28

== See also ==
- 2018 World Team Table Tennis Championships
- 2018 ITTF World Tour
