= Yukiya Uda =

Japanese table tennis player

Personal information
- Nationality: Japanese
- Born: 6 August 2001 (age 25) Chōfu, Tokyo

Sport
- Sport: Table tennis
- Club: TSV Bad Königshofen (Bundesliga)
- Playing style: Left-handed shakehand grip
- Equipment: Butterfly Custom ZL blade, Dignics 05 FH, Dignics 80 BH
- Highest ranking: 19 (4 April 2023)
- Current ranking: 34 (2 November 2026)
Medal record
Men's table tennis
Representing Japan
World Championships
Silver medal – second place	2026 London	Team
Bronze medal – third place	2021 Houston	Doubles
Asian Games
Gold medal – first place	2026 Aichi-Nagoya	Team
Asian Championships
Gold medal – first place	2021 Doha	Doubles
Bronze medal – third place	2019 Yogyakarta	Team

Yukiya Uda (宇田 幸矢, Uda Yukiya; born 6 August 2001) is a Japanese table tennis player. He is also a member of the JOC Elite Academy (JOCエリートアカデミー) in Tokyo.

He won the mixed doubles title at the 2019 World Junior Table Tennis Championships with Miyuu Kihara. In 2020, Yukiya won the 2020 Japanese National title, defeating Harimoto in the finals.

== Career records ==
Singles

- World Junior Table Tennis Championships: 2nd (2018)

Doubles

- World Junior Table Tennis Championships: 3rd (2017)
- Asian Junior and Cadet Championships: 1st (2019), 3rd (2017).

Mixed Doubles

- World Junior Table Tennis Championships: 1st (2019)
- Asian Junior and Cadet Championships: 3rd (2019).

Team

- World Junior Table Tennis Championships: 2nd (2017, 2018), 3rd (2019)
- Asian Junior and Cadet Championships: 1st (2016), 3rd (2014, 2015, 2018).

== Teams ==
Uda originally played in the T.League. In 2022, he joined TSV Bad Königshofen in Bundesliga.

- Kinoshita Meister Tokyo (2019–2020)
- Ryukyu Asteeda (2020–2022)
- TSV Bad Königshofen (2022–)
