= Kong Lingxuan =

Chinese table tennis player

Personal information
- Nationality: Chinese

Sport
- Sport: Table tennis
- Highest ranking: 150 (April 2014)
- Current ranking: 167 (August 2014)
Medal record
Men's table tennis
Representing China
World Junior Championships
Bronze medal – third place	2013 Rabat	Singles
Gold medal – first place	2013 Rabat	Doubles
Gold medal – first place	2013 Rabat	Mixed Doubles
Gold medal – first place	2013 Rabat	Team

Kong Lingxuan is a Chinese table tennis player. He previously represented China at the 2013 World Junior Table Tennis Championships in Rabat, Morocco.
