= 2015 World Junior Table Tennis Championships =

Table tennis tournament in France

Tournament details
- Dates: 29 November – 6 December 2015
- Edition: 13th
- Venue: Vendéspace
- Location: Vendée, France

The 2015 World Junior Table Tennis Championships were held in Vendée, France, from 29 November to 6 December 2015. It was organised by the Fédération Française de Tennis de Table under the auspices and authority of the International Table Tennis Federation (ITTF).

== Medal summary ==
=== Events ===
Event	Gold	Silver	Bronze
Boys' singles	China; Liu Dingshuo	China; Xue Fei	China; Wang Chuqin
Boys' singles	China; Liu Dingshuo	China; Xue Fei	China; Zhu Cheng
Girls' singles	China; Wang Manyu	China; Wang Yidi	China; Chen Ke
Girls' singles	China; Wang Manyu	China; Wang Yidi	China; Chen Xingtong
Boys' doubles	China; Wang Chuqin; Xue Fei	China; Liu Dingshuo; Zhu Cheng	Hong Kong; Ho Kwan Kit; Ng Pak Nam
Boys' doubles	China; Wang Chuqin; Xue Fei	China; Liu Dingshuo; Zhu Cheng	South Korea; An Jae-hyun; Cho Seung-min
Girls' doubles	China; Chen Ke; Wang Manyu	North Korea; Ko Un-gum; Ri Yong-hae	South Korea; An Yeongeun; Kim Jiho
Girls' doubles	China; Chen Ke; Wang Manyu	North Korea; Ko Un-gum; Ri Yong-hae	South Korea; Kang Dayeon; Kim Haeun
Mixed doubles	China; Xue Fei; Chen Ke	China; Wang Chuqin; Chen Xingtong	China; Zhu Cheng; Wang Manyu
Mixed doubles	China; Xue Fei; Chen Ke	China; Wang Chuqin; Chen Xingtong	Hong Kong; Ho Kwan Kit; Minnie Soo Wai Yam
Boys' team	China; Liu Dingshuo; Zhu Cheng; Wang Chuqin; Xue Fei	South Korea; Hwang Minha; Park Jeongwoo; Cho Seungmin; An Jaehyun	France; Can Akkuzu; Romain Ruiz; Leo de Nodrest; Joe Seyfried
Boys' team	China; Liu Dingshuo; Zhu Cheng; Wang Chuqin; Xue Fei	South Korea; Hwang Minha; Park Jeongwoo; Cho Seungmin; An Jaehyun	Hong Kong; Ng Pak Nam; Ho Kwan Kit; Kwan Man Ho; Lee Yat Hin
Girls' team	China; Chen Ke; Wang Manyu; Chen Xingtong; Wang Yidi	South Korea; An Yeongeun; Kim Jiho; Kang Dayeon; Kim Haeun	Romania; Adina Diaconu; Andreea Dragoman; Andreea Clapa; Diana Lupu
Girls' team	China; Chen Ke; Wang Manyu; Chen Xingtong; Wang Yidi	South Korea; An Yeongeun; Kim Jiho; Kang Dayeon; Kim Haeun	United States; Prachi Jha; Grace Yang; Crystal Wang; Amy Wang

=== Medal table ===
* Host nation (France)

Rank	Nation	Gold	Silver	Bronze	Total
1	China	7	4	5	16
2	South Korea	0	2	3	5
3	North Korea	0	1	0	1
4	Hong Kong	0	0	3	3
5	France*	0	0	1	1
5	Romania	0	0	1	1
5	United States	0	0	1	1
Totals (7 entries)		7	7	14	28

== See also ==
- 2015 World Table Tennis Championships
