= Cem Zeng =

Turkish table tennis player

Personal information
- Full name: Zheng Changgong
- Nationality: Turkey
- Born: October 21, 1985 (age 40) China
- Height: 1.70 m (5 ft 7 in)

Sport
- Sport: Table tennis
- Playing style: All round player

Cem Zengi (born as Zheng Changgong 郑长弓 October 21, 1985 in China) is a male Chinese-born Turkish table tennis player. He has played for Fenerbahçe TT since 2006; he also has played for Quan Xing Si Chuan in China.

== Major achievements ==
- Played for Turkey 2008 Olympic Team in 2008 Olympic Games in China
- 3 time Turkish Super League Champion
- 1 time ETTU Cup Runner-up
- 2 time Save the Greate White Pandas Table Tennis Conference
