= ITTF World Youth Championships =

Table tennis competition (2003–pres.)

Tournament information
- Sport: Table tennis
- Location: Global
- Established: 2003
- Administrator: ITTF
- Tournament format(s): Singles: Knockout; Doubles: Knockout; Team: Knockout

The ITTF World Youth Championships is an annual table tennis competition for juniors under 19 and under 15. From 2003 to 2019, the World Junior Table Tennis Championships was held for juniors under 18. The ITTF changed the U18 age group into U19 in 2020, and implemented the new World Youth Championships for U19 and U15 in 2021. The World Youth Championships is currently composed of two team events and five individual events in each of the U19 and U15 age groups.

== Editions ==
Number	Year	Host city	Host country	Events	Medals winner	Ref
World Junior Table Tennis Championships (U18)
1	2003	Santiago	Chile	7	China	
2	2004	Kobe	Japan	7	China	
3	2005	Linz	Austria	7	China	
4	2006	Cairo	Egypt	7	China	
5	2007	Palo Alto	United States	7	China	
6	2008	Madrid	Spain	7	China	
7	2009	Cartagena	Colombia	7	China	
8	2010	Bratislava	Slovakia	7	China	
9	2011	Manama	Bahrain	7	China	
10	2012	Hyderabad	India	7	China	
11	2013	Rabat	Morocco	7	China	
12	2014	Shanghai	China	7	China	
13	2015	Vendée	France	7	China	
14	2016	Cape Town	South Africa	7	Japan	
15	2017	Riva del Garda	Italy	7	China	
16	2018	Bendigo	Australia	7	China	
17	2019	Nakhon Ratchasima	Thailand	7	China	
ITTF World Youth Championships (U19 + U15)
1	2021	Vila Nova de Gaia	Portugal	14	Japan	
2	2022	Tunis	Tunisia	14	China	
3	2023	Nova Gorica	Slovenia	14	China	
4	2024	Helsingborg	Sweden	14	China	
5	2025	Cluj Napoca	Romania	14	China	
6	2026	Istanbul	Turkey	14		
7	2027	Asuncion	Paraguay	14		

- 2020 World Junior Table Tennis Championships was cancelled due to the COVID-19 pandemic.

== Medals ==
=== World Junior Table Tennis Championships (2003–2019) ===
Rank	Nation	Gold	Silver	Bronze	Total
1	China (CHN)	97	49	67	213
2	Japan (JPN)	13	32	39	84
3	South Korea (KOR)	5	17	32	54
4	Chinese Taipei (TPE)	2	1	13	16
5	Germany (GER)	1	3	17	21
6	Romania (ROU)	1	1	15.5	17.5
7	Russia (RUS)	0	3	4	7
8	France (FRA)	0	2	11.5	13.5
9	Hungary (HUN)	0	2	1	3
9	Sweden (SWE)	0	2	1	3
11	Serbia and Montenegro (SCG)	0	2	0	2
12	Hong Kong (HKG)	0	1	13.5	14.5
13	North Korea (PRK)	0	1	2	3
14	England (ENG)	0	1	1	2
14	Portugal (POR)	0	1	1	2
14	Spain (ESP)	0	1	1	2
17	Poland (POL)	0	0	3	3
18	United States (USA)	0	0	2	2
19	Croatia (CRO)	0	0	1.5	1.5
19	Serbia (SRB)	0	0	1.5	1.5
21	Canada (CAN)	0	0	1	1
21	Czech Republic (CZE)	0	0	1	1
21	Singapore (SGP)	0	0	1	1
24	India (IND)	0	0	0.5	0.5
24	Italy (ITA)	0	0	0.5	0.5
24	Slovenia (SLO)	0	0	0.5	0.5
Totals (26 entries)		119	119	232	470

- 2003, 2004 and 2005 have not share bronze medals in team events.

=== ITTF World Youth Championships (2021–2025) ===
Rank	Nation	Gold	Silver	Bronze	Total
1	China (CHN)	40	15	16	71
2	Japan (JPN)	15	15.5	20	50.5
3	Chinese Taipei (TPE)	4	3	15.5	22.5
4	Germany (GER)	2.5	2	10.5	15
5	Russia (RUS)	2	3	0	5
6	France (FRA)	1.5	2	15	18.5
7	South Korea (KOR)	1	7.5	17	25.5
8	Egypt (EGY)	1	1	1.5	3.5
9	Thailand (THA)	1	0	0	1
10	Wales (WAL)	0.5	1	2	3.5
11	Hungary (HUN)	0.5	0.5	0	1
12	Kazakhstan (KAZ)	0.5	0	1	1.5
13	Slovakia (SVK)	0.5	0	0	0.5
14	Poland (POL)	0	5	4	9
15	United States (USA)	0	3	1	4
16	Romania (ROU)	0	2.5	11	13.5
17	India (IND)	0	2	8.5	10.5
18	Italy (ITA)	0	1.5	1	2.5
19	Singapore (SGP)	0	1	3	4
20	Australia (AUS)	0	1	2	3
21	Turkey (TUR)	0	1	0	1
22	Portugal (POR)	0	0.5	4	4.5
23	Belgium (BEL)	0	0.5	0	0.5
23	Colombia (COL)	0	0.5	0	0.5
23	Croatia (CRO)	0	0.5	0	0.5
23	Spain (ESP)	0	0.5	0	0.5
27	Brazil (BRA)	0	0	1.5	1.5
28	Hong Kong (HKG)	0	0	1	1
28	Iran (IRI)	0	0	1	1
28	Malaysia (MAS)	0	0	1	1
28	Ukraine (UKR)	0	0	1	1
32	Nigeria (NGR)	0	0	0.5	0.5
32	Peru (PER)	0	0	0.5	0.5
32	Sweden (SWE)	0	0	0.5	0.5
Totals (34 entries)		70	70	140	280

== See also ==
- Table tennis at the Youth Olympic Games
- World Table Tennis Championships
- World Para Table Tennis Championships
- World Hopes Table Tennis Championship (U13/U11/U9)
