= Liu Gaoyang =

Chinese table tennis player

Personal information
- Native name: 刘高阳
- Nationality: Chinese

Sport
- Sport: Table tennis
- Highest ranking: 28 (March 2014)
- Current ranking: 45 (January 2016)
Medal record
Women's table tennis
Representing China
World Junior Championships
Gold medal – first place	2014 Shanghai	Doubles
Bronze medal – third place	2014 Shanghai	Mixed Doubles
Gold medal – first place	2014 Shanghai	Team
Silver medal – second place	2013 Rabat	Singles
Silver medal – second place	2013 Rabat	Doubles
Gold medal – first place	2013 Rabat	Team
Youth Olympic Games
Gold medal – first place	2014 Nanjing	Singles
Gold medal – first place	2014 Nanjing	Mixed Team
Asian Youth Games
Gold medal – first place	2013 Nanjing	Singles

Liu Gaoyang (Chinese: 刘高阳) is a Chinese table tennis player.

Liu represented China at the 2014 Summer Youth Olympic Games in Nanjing, winning Gold in the Women's Singles and Mixed Team events.
