= Liu Dingshuo =

Chinese table tennis player

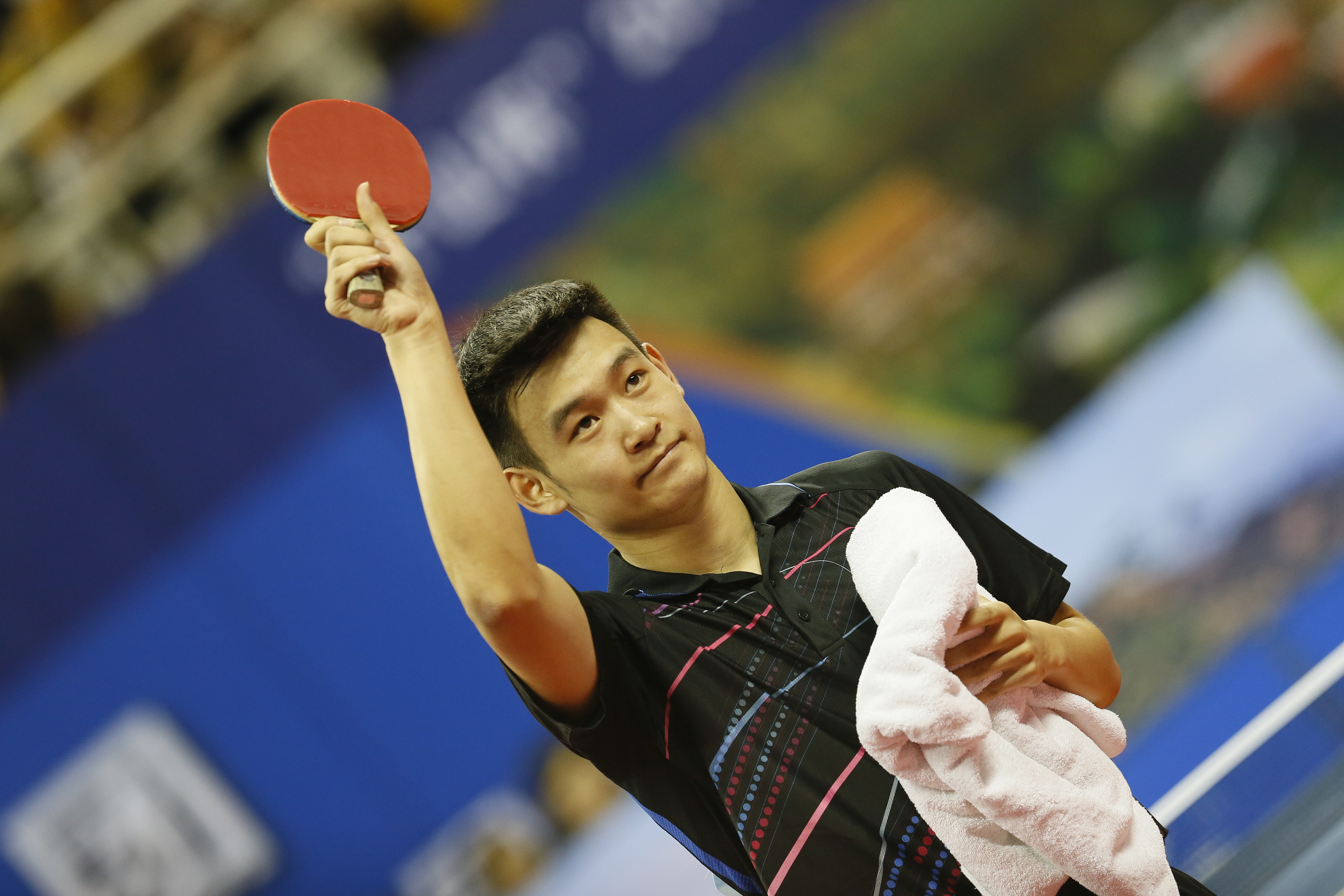

Personal information
- Born: 13 January 1998 (age 28)

Sport
- Sport: Table tennis
- Playing style: Right-handed, shakehand grip
- Highest ranking: 41 (January 2019)
- Current ranking: 146 (4 July 2023)
Medal record
World University Games
Gold medal – first place	2021 Chengdu	Mixed doubles
Gold medal – first place	2021 Chengdu	Team
Bronze medal – third place	2021 Chengdu	Doubles

Liu Dingshuo (Chinese: 刘丁硕; born 13 January 1998) is a male Chinese table tennis player. He is the winner of the boys' singles title at the 2015 World Junior Table Tennis Championships.

== Career ==
=== 2021 ===
In September, Liu upset Xu Xin in the quarter-finals to reach the semi-finals of the China National Games. Liu won silver after defeating Wang Chuqin in the semi-finals and then losing to Fan Zhendong in the finals.

=== 2023 ===
In September, Liu starts playing for Jura-Morez in Pro-A France.
