= Amelie Solja =

Austrian table tennis player (born 1990)

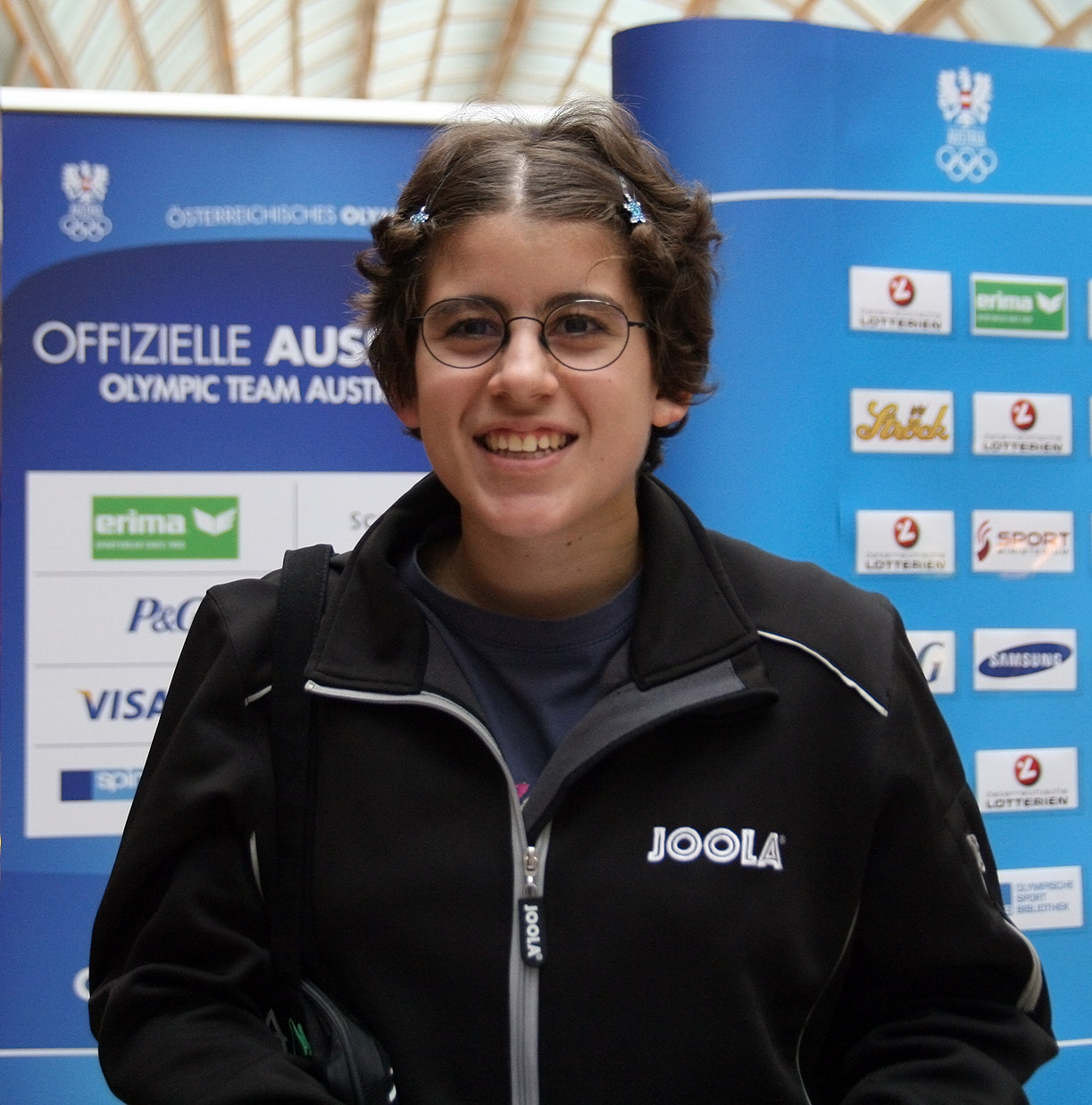

Personal information
- Nationality: Austrian
- Born: 29 September 1990 (age 34); Kandel, Rhineland-Palatinate, Germany

Sport
- Sport: Table tennis

Amelie Solja (born 29 September 1990) is an Austrian table tennis player, born in Kandel, Germany. She competed in women's team at the 2012 Summer Olympics in London. Her sister Petrissa Solja was a silver medalist at the 2016 Olympic Games for Germany.
