= 2017 ITTF Challenge Series =

Table tennis tournament

ITTF Challenge Series
Tournament details
- Dates: 15 March 2017 – 26 November 2017
- Edition: 1st

The 2017 ITTF Challenge Series was the inaugural season of the International Table Tennis Federation's secondary professional table tennis tour, a level below the ITTF World Tour.

== Schedule ==
Below is the schedule released by the ITTF:

Tour	Event	Location	Venue	Date		Prize money (USD)	Ref.
Tour	Event	Location	Venue	Start	Finish	Prize money (USD)	Ref.
1	Belarus Open	Minsk	Minsk Tennis Palace	March 15	March 19	40,000	
2	Thailand Open	Bangkok	Fashion Island - Island Hall	March 29	April 2	35,000	
3	Chile Open	Santiago	Centro de Entrenamiento Olímpico	April 26	April 30	35,000	
4	Slovenia Open	Otočec	Otočec Sports Centre	April 26	April 30	35,000	
5	(Croatia) Zagreb Open	Zagreb	Zagreb Hall of Sports	May 2	May 6	35,000	
6	Brazil Open	São Paulo	Brazilian Paralympic Center	May 3	May 7	25,000	
7	(North Korea) Pyongyang Open	Pyongyang	Pyongyang Table Tennis Hall	August 2	August 6	35,000	
8	(Nigeria) Nigerian Open	Lagos	Sir Molade Okoya-Thomas Indoor Hall	August 9	August 13	46,000	
9	(Poland) Polish Open	Częstochowa	Częstochowa Sport Hall	October 4	October 8	35,000	
10	Belgium Open	De Haan	Sport en Recreatiecentrum Haneveld	October 31	November 4	35,000	
11	(Spain) Spanish Open	Almeria	Palacio de los Juegos del Mediterráneo	November 22	November 26	70,000	

== Winners ==
Event	Men's singles	Women's singles	Men's doubles	Women's doubles	U21 Men's singles	U21 Women's singles
Belarus Open	(Belarus) Vladimir Samsonov	(Japan) Hitomi Sato	(Poland) Daniel Górak (Poland) Wang Zengyi	(Japan) Miyu Kato (Japan) Misaki Morizono	(Romania) Cristian Pletea	(Japan) Saki Shibata
Thailand Open	(Japan) Jin Ueda	(Japan) Hitomi Sato	(Japan) Kenji Matsudaira (Japan) Jin Ueda	(Japan) Honoka Hashimoto (Japan) Hitomi Sato	(Japan) Yuma Tsuboi	(Japan) Saki Shibata
Chile Open	(India) Soumyajit Ghosh	(Brazil) Caroline Kumahara	(India) Amalraj Anthony (India) Soumyajit Ghosh	(Argentina) Ana Codina (Argentina) Candela Molero	(Argentina) Horacio Cifuentes	(Chile) Valentina Rios
Slovenia Open	(Germany) Bastian Steger	(Japan) Hitomi Sato	(South Korea) Choi Won-jin (South Korea) Lee Jung-woo	(Sweden) Matilda Ekholm (Hungary) Georgina Póta	(Japan) Yuki Matsuyama	(Puerto Rico) Adriana Diaz
(Croatia) Zagreb Open	(Greece) Panagiotis Gionis	(Japan) Honoka Hashimoto	(Sweden) Viktor Brodd (Sweden) Hampus Nordberg	(Japan) Honoka Hashimoto (Japan) Hitomi Sato	(Japan) Koyo Kanamitsu	(Romania) Adina Diaconu
Brazil Open	(Brazil) Hugo Calderano	(Romania) Bernadette Szőcs	(Brazil) Hugo Calderano (Brazil) Gustavo Tsuboi	(Romania) Bernadette Szőcs (France) Audrey Zarif	(France) Andrea Landrieu	(Brazil) Bruna Takahashi
(North Korea) Pyongyang Open	(North Korea) Pak Sin-hyok	(North Korea) Kim Song-i	(North Korea) Choe Il (North Korea) Pak Sin-hyok	(North Korea) Choe Hyon-hwa (North Korea) Kim Song-i	(North Korea) Kim Ok-chan	(North Korea) Ri Hyon-sim
(Nigeria) Nigerian Open	(Egypt) Omar Assar	(Egypt) Dina Meshref	(France) Antoine Hachard (France) Gregoire Jean	(Hungary) Bernadett Balint (Hungary) Szandra Pergel	(Egypt) Youssef Abdel-Aziz	(Italy) Giorgia Piccolin
(Poland) Polish Open	(Nigeria) Quadri Aruna	(Japan) Mima Ito	(Hong Kong) Ho Kwan Kit (Hong Kong) Ng Pak Nam	(Hong Kong) Doo Hoi Kem (Hong Kong) Lee Ho Ching	(Japan) Mizuki Oikawa	(Germany) Nina Mittelham
(Belgium) Belgian Open	(South Korea) Kim Dong-hyun	(Japan) Saki Shibata	(Germany) Patrick Franziska (Germany) Ricardo Walther	(Japan) Honoka Hashimoto (Japan) Hitomi Sato	(Japan) Shunsuke Togami	(Chinese Taipei) Li Yu-jhun
(Spain) Spanish Open	(India) Sathiyan Gnanasekaran	(Japan) Hina Hayata	(South Korea) Cho Seung-min (South Korea) Park Gang-hyeon	(South Korea) Jeon Ji-hee (South Korea) Yang Ha-eun	(Hong Kong) Lam Siu Hang	(Japan) Satsuki Odo

== See also ==
- 2017 World Table Tennis Championships
- 2017 ITTF Men's World Cup
- 2017 ITTF Women's World Cup
- 2017 ITTF World Tour
- 2017 in table tennis
