= 2017 in table tennis =

This page lists notable table tennis events taking place in 2017, including the 2017 World Table Tennis Championships and the 2017 ITTF World Tour.

== World table tennis championships ==
=== Senior ===
- May 29 – June 5: 2017 World Table Tennis Championships in (Germany) Düsseldorf

Event	Gold	Silver	Bronze
Men's singles	(China) Ma Long	(China) Fan Zhendong	(China) Xu Xin
Men's singles	(China) Ma Long	(China) Fan Zhendong	(South Korea) Lee Sang-su
Women's singles	(China) Ding Ning	(China) Zhu Yuling	(Japan) Miu Hirano
Women's singles	(China) Ding Ning	(China) Zhu Yuling	(China) Liu Shiwen
Men's doubles	(China) Fan Zhendong (China) Xu Xin	(Japan) Masataka Morizono (Japan) Yuya Oshima	(South Korea) Jung Young-sik (South Korea) Lee Sang-su
Men's doubles	(China) Fan Zhendong (China) Xu Xin	(Japan) Masataka Morizono (Japan) Yuya Oshima	(Japan) Koki Niwa (Japan) Maharu Yoshimura
Women's doubles	(China) Ding Ning (China) Liu Shiwen	(China) Chen Meng (China) Zhu Yuling	(Singapore) Feng Tianwei (Singapore) Yu Mengyu
Women's doubles	(China) Ding Ning (China) Liu Shiwen	(China) Chen Meng (China) Zhu Yuling	(Japan) Hina Hayata (Japan) Mima Ito
Mixed doubles	(Japan) Maharu Yoshimura (Japan) Kasumi Ishikawa	(Chinese Taipei) Chen Chien-an (Chinese Taipei) Cheng I-ching	(China) Fang Bo (Germany) Petrissa Solja
Mixed doubles	(Japan) Maharu Yoshimura (Japan) Kasumi Ishikawa	(Chinese Taipei) Chen Chien-an (Chinese Taipei) Cheng I-ching	(Hong Kong) Wong Chun Ting (Hong Kong) Doo Hoi Kem

- October 20–22: 2017 ITTF Men's World Cup in (Belgium) Liège
  - (gold) (Germany) Dimitrij Ovtcharov
  - (silver) (Germany) Timo Boll
  - (bronze) (China) Ma Long
- October 27–29: 2017 ITTF Women's World Cup in (Canada) Markham
  - (gold) (China) Zhu Yuling
  - (silver) (China) Liu Shiwen
  - (bronze) (Chinese Taipei) Cheng I-ching

=== Junior and cadet ===
- October 21–29: 2017 World Cadet Challenge in (Fiji) Suva
  - Cadet boys' singles: (China) NIU Guankai
  - Cadet girls' singles: (Japan) Yumeno Soma
  - Cadet boys' doubles: (Chinese Taipei) FENG Yi-Hsin & (China) NIU Guankai
  - Cadet girls' doubles: (China) HUANG Yingqi & (Japan) Yumeno Soma
  - Cadet mixed doubles: (China) NIU Guankai & (Italy) Jamila Laurenti
- November 26 – December 3: 2017 World Junior Table Tennis Championships in (Italy) Riva del Garda
  - Junior boys' singles: (China) XUE Fei
  - Junior girls' singles: (China) SUN Yingsha
  - Junior boys' doubles: (China) XUE Fei & WANG Chuqin
  - Junior girls' doubles: (China) SHI Xunyao & SUN Yingsha
  - Junior mixed doubles: (China) XUE Fei & Wang Manyu

=== Para TT ===
- May 17–20: 2017 Para Table Tennis World Team Championships in (Slovakia) Bratislava
  - For results, click here for this event's results book page.

== Continental table tennis championships ==
=== Africa ===
- April 9–15: 2017 African Junior & Cadet Table Tennis Championships in (Tunisia) Tunis

- Junior boys' singles: (Egypt) Youssef Abdel-Aziz
- Junior girls' singles: (Egypt) Marwa Alhodaby
- Junior boys' doubles: (Egypt) Youssef Abdel-Aziz & Karim Elhakem
- Junior girls' doubles: (Egypt) Mariam Alhodaby & Marwa Alhodaby
- Junior mixed doubles: (Egypt) Youssef Abdel-Aziz & Marwa Alhodaby
- Junior boys' teams: (Egypt) Youssef Abdel-Aziz, Karim Elhakem, & Ahmed Elborhamy
- Junior girls' teams: (Egypt) Marwa Alhodaby, Sarah Abousetta, & Mariam Alhodaby
- Cadet boys' singles: (Egypt) Mohamed Azzam
- Cadet girls' singles: (Tunisia) Fadwa Garci
- Cadet boys' teams: (Egypt) Mohamed Azzam & Youssef Ehab
- Cadet girls' teams: (Egypt) Sara Elhakem & Hana Mahmoud

- July 1–3: 2017 African Cup in (Morocco) Agadir
  - Men's singles: (Nigeria) Quadri Aruna
  - Women's singles: (Egypt) Dina Meshref

=== Americas ===
==== Senior ====
- July 28–30: 2017 Pan American Cup in (Costa Rica) San José
  - Men's singles: (Brazil) Gustavo Tsuboi
  - Women's singles: (United States) Lily Zhang
- September 11–17: 2017 Pan American Table Tennis Championships in (Colombia) Cartagena
  - Men's singles: (Brazil) Hugo Calderano
  - Women's singles: (Puerto Rico) Adriana Díaz
  - Men's doubles: (Brazil) Vitor Ishiy & Eric Jouti
  - Women's doubles: (Canada) Alicia Cote & Zhang Mo
  - Mixed doubles: (Brazil) Vitor Ishiy & Bruna Takahashi
  - Men's team: Brazil (Eric Jouti, Thiago Monteiro, & Vitor Ishiy)
  - Women's team: Brazil (Bruna Takahashi, Lin Gui, & Bruna Alexandre)

==== Junior and cadet ====
- February 8–11: 2017 Central American Junior & Cadet Championships in Guatemala City

- Junior boys' singles: (Mexico) Diego Fuentes
- Junior girls' singles: (Guatemala) Lucía Cordero
- Junior boys' doubles: (Mexico) Diego Fuentes & George Wang
- Junior girls' doubles: (Guatemala) Lucía Cordero & Hidalynn Zapata
- Junior mixed doubles: (Guatemala) Noe Sánchez & Lucía Cordero
- Junior boys' team: Mexico
- Junior girls' team: Guatemala
- Cadet boys' singles: (Mexico) Darío Arce
- Cadet girls' singles: (Mexico) Clío Bárcenas
- Cadet boys' doubles: (Mexico) Darío Arce & Adrián Castillo
- Cadet girls' doubles: (Mexico) Mabella Aceves & Clío Bárcenas
- Cadet mixed doubles: (Mexico) Darío Arce & Clío Bárcenas
- Cadet boys' team: Mexico
- Cadet girls' team: Mexico

- March 18–22: 2017 South American Junior & Cadet Championships in (Paraguay) Asunción

- Junior boys' singles: (Chile) Nicolás Burgos
- Junior girls' singles: (Ecuador) Nathaly Paredes
- Junior boys' doubles: (Brazil) Siddharta Almeida & Luiz Anjos
- Junior girls' doubles: (Brazil) Alexia Nakashima & Luana Souza
- Junior mixed doubles: (Brazil) Siddharta Almeida & Alexia Nakashima
- Junior boys' team: Brazil
- Junior girls' team: Brazil
- Cadet boys' singles: (Brazil) Diogo Silva
- Cadet girls' singles: (Brazil) Livia Lima
- Cadet boys' doubles: (Brazil) Daniel Godoi & Diogo Silva
- Cadet girls' doubles: (Brazil) Livia Lima & Giulia Takahashi
- Cadet mixed doubles: (Brazil) Daniel Godoi & Livia Lima
- Cadet boys' team: Brazil
- Cadet girls' team: Brazil

- June 20–25: 2017 Pan American Junior Table Tennis Championships in (Argentina) Buenos Aires

- Junior boys' singles: (United States) Kanak Jha
- Junior girls' singles: (Brazil) Bruna Takahashi
- Junior boys' doubles: (United States) Sharon Alguetti & Kanak Jha
- Junior girls' doubles: (Brazil) Alexia Nakashima & Bruna Takahashi
- Junior mixed doubles: (Brazil) Siddharta Almeida & Bruna Takahashi
- Junior boys' team: United States
- Junior girls' team: United States

==== Para TT ====
- November 28 – December 4: 2017 Para TT Americas Championships in (Costa Rica) San José

=== Asia ===
==== Senior ====
- April 9–16: 2017 Asian Table Tennis Championships in Wuxi
  - Men's singles: (China) Fan Zhendong
  - Women's singles: (Japan) Miu Hirano
  - Men's doubles: (China) Fan Zhendong & Lin Gaoyuan
  - Women's doubles: (China) Chen Meng & Zhu Yuling
  - Mixed doubles: (China) Zhou Yu & Chen Xingtong
  - Men's team: China
  - Women's team: China
- September 15–17: 2017 Asian Cup in (India) Ahmedabad
  - Men's singles: (China) Lin Gaoyuan
  - Women's singles: (China) Zhu Yuling

==== Junior and cadet ====
- June 29 – July 4: 2017 Asian Junior & Cadet Table Tennis Championships in (South Korea) Asan

- Junior boys' singles: (China) WANG Chuqin
- Junior girls' singles: (China) SUN Yingsha
- Junior boys' doubles: (South Korea) AN Jae-hyun & HWANG Min-ha
- Junior girls' doubles: (China) SUN Yingsha & QIAN Tianyi
- Junior mixed doubles: (China) WANG Chuqin & SUN Yingsha
- Junior boys' team: China (WANG Chuqin, XUE Fei, & XU Yingbin)
- Junior girls' team: China (SUN Yingsha, SHI Xunyao, & QIAN Tianyi)
- Cadet boys' singles: (China) NIU Guankai
- Cadet girls' singles: (Japan) Yumeno Soma
- Cadet boys' team: China (NIU Guankai, YU Zhengyang, & SONG Zhuoheng)
- Cadet girls' team: China (WANG Tianyi, HUANG Yingqi, & KUAI Man)

==== Para TT ====
- August 23–31: Para TT Asian Championships in Beijing
  - China won both the gold and overall medal tallies.

=== Europe ===
==== Senior ====
- February 3–5: 2017 Europe Top-16 in (France) Antibes
  - Men: (gold) (Germany) Dimitrij Ovtcharov; (silver) (Russia) Alexander Shibaev; (bronze) (France) Simon Gauzy
  - Women: (gold) (Netherlands) Li Jie; (silver) (Germany) Petrissa Solja; (bronze) (Germany) Sabine Winter
- June 26 – July 1: 2017 European Veterans Championships in (Sweden) Helsingborg
  - For results, click here.
- September 13–17: 2017 European Team Table Tennis Championships in Luxembourg City
  - Men: (gold) Germany; (silver) Portugal; (bronze) Slovenia & France
  - Women: (gold) Romania; (silver) Germany; (bronze) Netherlands & Russia

==== U-21, Junior and cadet ====
- February 2–5: 2017 European Under-21 Table Tennis Championships in (Russia) Sochi (debut event)
  - Men's singles: (Croatia) Tomislav Pucar
  - Women's singles: (Germany) Chantal Mantz
  - Men's doubles: (Denmark) Anders Lind & (Slovakia) Alexander Valuch
  - Women's doubles: (Belgium) Eline Loyen & Lisa Lung
- July 14–23: 2017 European Youth Table Tennis Championships in (Portugal) Guimarães
  - Men's singles: (Greece) Ioannis Sgouropoulos
  - Women's singles: (Azerbaijan) Ning Jing
  - Men's doubles: (Romania) Cristian Pletea & (Russia) Denis Ivonin
  - Women's doubles: (Bulgaria) Maria Yovkova & (Hungary) Fanni Harasztovich
  - Mixed doubles: (France) Jules Rolland & Lucie Gauthier
  - teams: Germany (m) / Russia (f)
- September 8–10: 2017 Europe Youth Top-10 in (England) Worcester
  - Junior boys' winner: (Romania) Cristian Pletea
  - Junior girls' winner: (Romania) Adina Diaconu
  - Cadet boys' winner: (Poland) Samuel Kulczycki
  - Cadet girls' winner: (Germany) Sophia Klee

==== Para TT ====
- September 26 – October 5: 2017 Para TT European Championships in (Slovenia) Laško
  - Ukraine won the gold medal tally. Turkey and Poland won 12 overall medals each.

=== Oceania ===
- April 13–16: 2017 Oceania Junior Table Tennis Championships in (Fiji) Suva

- Junior boys' singles: (New Zealand) Dean Shu
- Junior girls' singles: (Australia) Holly Nicolas
- Junior boys' doubles: (New Zealand) Victor Ma & Roger Wang
- Junior girls' doubles: (Australia) Matilda Alexandersson & Holly Nicolas
- Junior mixed doubles: (Australia) Rohan Dhooria & Holly Nicolas
- Junior boys' team: Australia
- Junior girls' team: Australia
- Cadet boys' singles: (Australia) Finn Luu
- Cadet girls' singles: (New Zealand) Jiayi Zhou
- Cadet boys' doubles: (Australia) Noah Kim & Finn Luu
- Cadet girls' doubles: (Australia) Sue Bin Oh & Cindy Suy
- Cadet mixed doubles: (Australia) Finn Luu & Cindy Suy
- Cadet boys' team: Australia
- Cadet girls' team: Australia

- April 13–16: 2017 Oceania Para Table Tennis Championships in (Fiji) Suva

- Men's singles (Class 2–3): (Australia) Chen Junjian
- Men's singles (Class 4–5): (Australia) Caleb Benjamin Crowden
- Men's singles (Class 6–7): (Australia) Trevor Hirth
- Men's singles (Class 8–9): (Australia) Nathan Pellissier
- Men's Team (Class 2–5): (Australia) Chen Junjian, Steven Michael Gow, & Caleb Benjamin Crowden
- Women's singles (Class 2–5): (Fiji) Merewalesi Vakacegu Roden
- Women's singles (Class 6–8): (Australia) Rebecca Anne Julian

- April 15–16: 2017 ITTF-Oceania Cup in (Fiji) Suva
  - Men: (gold) (Australia) David Powell; (silver) (Australia) Kane Townsend; (bronze) (Vanuatu) Yoshua Shing
  - Women: (gold) (Australia) Jian Fang Lay; (silver) (Australia) Melissa Tapper; (bronze) (New Caledonia) Solenn Danger

== 2017 ITTF World Tour ==
=== World Tour Platinum events ===
- February 21–26: Qatar Open in Doha
  - Men's singles: (China) Ma Long
  - Women's singles: (China) Chen Meng
  - Men's doubles: (Japan) Masataka Morizono & Yuya Oshima
  - Women's doubles: (China) Chen Meng & Wang Manyu
  - Under-21 Men's singles: (Hong Kong) Lam Siu Hang
  - Under-21 Women's singles: (Hong Kong) Doo Hoi Kem
- June 14–18: Japan Open in Tokyo
  - Men's singles: (China) Ma Long
  - Women's singles: (China) Sun Yingsha
  - Men's doubles: (China) Ma Long & Xu Xin
  - Women's doubles: (China) Chen Xingtong & Sun Yingsha
  - Under-21 Men's singles: (South Korea) Lim Jong-hoon
  - Under-21 Women's singles: (Japan) Yuka Umemura
- June 20–25: China Open in Chengdu
  - Men's singles: (Germany) Dimitrij Ovtcharov
  - Women's singles: (China) Ding Ning
  - Men's doubles: (Japan) Jin Ueda & Maharu Yoshimura
  - Women's doubles: (China) Ding Ning & Liu Shiwen
  - Under-21 Men's singles: (Japan) Yuto Kizukuri
  - Under-21 Women's singles: (Japan) Maki Shiomi
- July 2–7: Australian Open in (Australia) Brisbane
  - Men's singles: (Belarus) Vladimir Samsonov
  - Women's singles: (China) Chen Meng
  - Men's doubles: (South Korea) JANG Woo-jin & PARK Gang-hyeon
  - Women's doubles: (China) Chen Meng & Zhu Yuling
  - Under-21 Men's singles: (South Korea) PARK Gang-hyeon
  - Under-21 Women's singles: (Japan) Saki Shibata
- September 19–24: Austrian Open in (Austria) Linz
  - Men's singles: (China) LIN Gaoyuan
  - Women's singles: (China) Wang Manyu
  - Men's doubles: (Japan) Koki Niwa & Jin Ueda
  - Women's doubles: (China) CHEN Xingtong & SUN Yingsha
  - Under-21 Men's singles: (China) XUE Fei
  - Under-21 Women's singles: (China) Zhang Rui
- November 7–12: German Open in (Germany) Magdeburg
  - Men's singles: (Germany) Dimitrij Ovtcharov
  - Women's singles: (China) Chen Meng
  - Men's doubles: (South Korea) Jung Young-sik & Lee Sang-su
  - Women's doubles: (Japan) Hina Hayata & Miu Hirano
  - Under-21 Men's singles: (China) XUE Fei
  - Under-21 Women's singles: (China) CHEN Ke

=== World Tour events ===
- January 17–22: Hungarian Open in (Hungary) Budapest
  - Men's singles: (China) Yan An
  - Women's singles: (China) Chen Xingtong
  - Men's doubles: (China) Fang Bo & Zhou Yu
  - Women's doubles: (China) Chen Xingtong & Li Jiayi
  - Under-21 Men's singles: (Kazakhstan) Kirill Gerassimenko
  - Under-21 Women's singles: (Singapore) Zeng Jian
- February 14–19: India Open in New Delhi
  - Men's singles: (Germany) Dimitrij Ovtcharov
  - Women's singles: (Japan) Sakura Mori
  - Men's doubles: (Japan) Masataka Morizono & Yuya Oshima
  - Women's doubles: (Sweden) Matilda Ekholm & (Hungary) Georgina Póta
  - Under-21 Men's singles: (Japan) Asuka Sakai
  - Under-21 Women's singles: (Japan) Sakura Mori
- April 18–23: Korea Open in (South Korea) Incheon
  - Men's singles: (Germany) Timo Boll
  - Women's singles: (Singapore) Feng Tianwei
  - Men's doubles: (South Korea) Jang Woo-jin & Jeong Sang-eun
  - Women's doubles: (Germany) Shan Xiaona & Petrissa Solja
  - Under-21 Men's singles: (South Korea) Lim Jong-hoon
  - Under-21 Women's singles: (Japan) Minami Ando
- August 15–20: Bulgaria Open in Panagyurishte
  - Men's singles: (Germany) Dimitrij Ovtcharov
  - Women's singles: (Japan) Kasumi Ishikawa
  - Men's doubles: (Japan) Jin Ueda & Maharu Yoshimura
  - Women's doubles: (Japan) Kasumi Ishikawa & Mima Ito
  - Under-21 Men's singles: (Japan) Mizuki Oikawa
  - Under-21 Women's singles: (Japan) Mizuki Morizono
- August 22–27: Czech Open in (Czech Republic) Olomouc
  - Men's singles: (Japan) Tomokazu Harimoto
  - Women's singles: (Japan) Mima Ito
  - Men's doubles: (Germany) Patrick Franziska & (Denmark) Jonathan Groth
  - Women's doubles: (Japan) Hina Hayata & Mima Ito
  - Under-21 Men's singles: (France) Can Akkuzu
  - Under-21 Women's singles: (Puerto Rico) Adriana Díaz
- November 13–19: Swedish Open in (Sweden) Stockholm
  - Men's singles: (China) Xu Xin
  - Women's singles: (China) CHEN Xingtong
  - Men's doubles: (China) Fan Zhendong & Xu Xin
  - Women's doubles: (Japan) Hina Hayata & Mima Ito
  - Under-21 Men's singles: (South Korea) PARK Gang-hyeon
  - Under-21 Women's singles: (China) Zhang Rui

=== Grand Finals ===
- December 14–17: 2017 ITTF World Tour Grand Finals in (Kazakhstan) Astana
  - Men's singles: (China) Fan Zhendong
  - Women's singles: (China) Chen Meng
  - Men's doubles: (Japan) Masataka Morizono & Yuya Oshima
  - Women's doubles: (China) Chen Meng & Zhu Yuling

== 2017 ITTF Challenge Series ==
- March 15–19: Belarus Open in Minsk
  - Men's singles: (Belarus) Vladimir Samsonov
  - Women's singles: (Japan) Hitomi Sato
  - Men's doubles: (Poland) Daniel Górak & Wang Zengyi
  - Women's doubles: (Japan) Miyu Kato & Misaki Morizono
  - Under-21 Men's singles: (Romania) Cristian Pletea
  - Under-21 Women's singles: (Japan) Saki Shibata
- March 29 – April 2: Thailand Open in Bangkok
  - Men's singles: (Japan) Jin Ueda
  - Women's singles: (Japan) Hitomi Sato
  - Men's doubles: (Japan) Kenji Matsudaira & Jin Ueda
  - Women's doubles: (Japan) Honoka Hashimoto & Hitomi Sato
  - Under-21 Men's singles: (Japan) Yuma Tsuboi
  - Under-21 Women's singles: (Japan) Saki Shibata
- April 26–30: Chile Open in Santiago
  - Men's singles: (India) Soumyajit Ghosh
  - Women's singles: (Brazil) Caroline Kumahara
  - Men's doubles: (India) Amalraj Anthony & Soumyajit Ghosh
  - Women's doubles: (Argentina) Ana Codina & Candela Molero
  - Under-21 Men's singles: (Argentina) Horacio Cifuentes
  - Under-21 Women's singles: (Chile) Valentina Rios
- April 26–30: Slovenia Open in Otočec
  - Men's singles: (Germany) Bastian Steger
  - Women's singles: (Japan) Hitomi Sato
  - Men's doubles: (South Korea) Choi Won-jin & Lee Jung-woo
  - Women's doubles: (Sweden) Matilda Ekholm & (Hungary) Georgina Pota
  - Under-21 Men's singles: (Japan) Yuki Matsuyama
  - Under-21 Women's singles: (Puerto Rico) Adriana Diaz
- May 2–6: Croatia Open in Zagreb
  - Men's singles: (Greece) Panagiotis Gionis
  - Women's singles: (Japan) Honoka Hashimoto
  - Men's doubles: (Sweden) Viktor Brodd & Hampus Nordberg
  - Women's doubles: (Japan) Honoka Hashimoto & Hitomi Sato
  - Under-21 Men's singles: (Japan) Koyo Kanamitsu
  - Under-21 Women's singles: (Romania) Adina Diaconu
- May 3–7: Brazil Open in São Paulo
  - Men's singles: (Brazil) Hugo Calderano
  - Women's singles: (Romania) Bernadette Szőcs
  - Men's doubles: (Brazil) Hugo Calderano & Gustavo Tsuboi
  - Women's doubles: (Romania) Bernadette Szőcs & (France) Audrey Zarif
  - Under-21 Men's singles: (France) Andrea Landrieu
  - Under-21 Women's singles: (Brazil) Bruna Takahashi
- August 2–6: Pyongyang Open in (North Korea) Pyongyang
  - Men's singles: (North Korea) PAK Sin Hyok
  - Women's singles: (North Korea) Kim Song-i
  - Men's doubles: (North Korea) CHOE Il & PAK Sin Hyok
  - Women's doubles: (North Korea) CHOE Hyon Hwa & KIM Song I
  - Under-21 Men's singles: (North Korea) KIM Ok Chan
  - Under-21 Women's singles: (North Korea) RI Hyon Sim
- August 9–13: Nigeria Open in Lagos
  - Men's singles: (Egypt) Omar Assar
  - Women's singles: (Egypt) Dina Meshref
  - Men's doubles: (France) Antoine Hachard & Gregoire Jean
  - Women's doubles: (Hungary) Bernadett Balint & Szandra Pergel
  - Under-21 Men's singles: (Egypt) Youssef Abdel-Aziz
  - Under-21 Women's singles: (Italy) Giorgia Piccolin
- October 4–8: Polish Open in (Poland) Warsaw
  - Men's singles: (Nigeria) Quadri Aruna
  - Women's singles: (Japan) Mima Ito
  - Men's doubles: (Hong Kong) Ho Kwan Kit & NG Pak Nam
  - Women's doubles: (Hong Kong) Doo Hoi Kem & Lee Ho Ching
  - Under-21 Men's singles: (Japan) Mizuki Oikawa
  - Under-21 Women's singles: (Germany) Nina Mittelham
- October 31 – November 4: Belgium Open in De Haan
  - Men's singles: (South Korea) KIM Dong-hyun
  - Women's singles: (Japan) Saki Shibata
  - Men's doubles: (Germany) Patrick Franziska & Ricardo Walther
  - Women's doubles: (Japan) Honoka Hashimoto & Hitomi Satō
  - Under-21 Men's singles: (Japan) Shunsuke Togami
  - Under-21 Women's singles: (Chinese Taipei) LI Yu-Jhun
- November 22–26: Spanish Open in (Spain) Almería
  - Men's singles: (India) Sathiyan Gnanasekaran
  - Women's singles: (Japan) Hina Hayata
  - Men's doubles: (South Korea) CHO Seung-min & PARK Gang-hyeon
  - Women's doubles: (South Korea) Jeon Ji-hee & Yang Ha-eun
  - Under-21 Men's singles: (Hong Kong) LAM Siu Hang
  - Under-21 Women's singles: (Japan) Satsuki Odo

== 2017 ITTF World Junior Circuit ==
=== Golden Series events ===
- May 10–14: Thailand Junior & Cadet Open in Bangkok

- Junior boys' singles: (Japan) Fumiya Igarashi
- Junior girls' singles: (Japan) Kasumi Kimura
- Cadet boys' singles: (Hong Kong) Maurice Kai Ning Chong
- Cadet girls' singles: (Chinese Taipei) HUANG Yu-Jie
- Junior boys' team: Japan (Seiya Numamura, Fumiya Igarashi, & Ryu Hiruta)
- Junior girls' team: Japan (Kasumi Kimura, Asuka Sasao & Ayano I)
- Cadet boys' team: Hong Kong (Chan Yee Shun, Maurice Kai Ning Chong, & Wong Hon Lam)
- Cadet girls' team: Hong Kong (Chau Wing Sze, Lee Ka Yee, & Poon Yat)

- May 24–28: Polish Junior & Cadet Open in (Poland) Władysławowo

- Junior boys' team: Japan (Shunsuke Togami, Jo Yokotani, & Kakeru Sone)
- Junior girls' team: Romania (Adina Diaconu, Andreea Dragoman, & Tania Plaian)
- Cadet boys' singles: (Japan) Kakeru Sone
- Cadet girls' singles: (Japan) Satsuki Odo
- Cadet boys' doubles: (Hungary) Csaba Andras & (Sweden) Martin Friis
- Cadet girls' doubles: (Russia) Elizabet Abraamian & Ekaterina Zironova
- Cadet boys' team: Hungary
- Cadet girls' team: Russia

- June 21–25: China Junior & Cadet Open in Taicang

- Junior boys' singles: (China) WANG Chuqin
- Junior girls' singles: (China) QIAN Tianyi
- Cadet boys' singles: (China) NIU Guankai
- Cadet girls' singles: (China) HUANG Yingqi
- Cadet boys' team: (China) SONG Zhuoheng & NIU Guankai
- Cadet girls' team: (China) WANG Tianyi, KUAI Man, & HUANG Yingqi

- August 2–6: Hong Kong Junior & Cadet Open in Hong Kong

- Junior boys' singles: (China) YANG Shuo
- Junior girls' singles: (China) LIU Weishan
- Junior boys' doubles: (Chinese Taipei) LI Hsin-Yang & LIN Yun-Ju
- Junior girls' doubles: (Japan) Miyuu Kihara / Miyu Nagasaki
- Junior boys' team: (China) XU Haidong, XU Yingbin, & YANG Shuo
- Junior girls' team: (China) QIAN Tianyi, SHI Xunyao, & LIU Weishan
- Cadet boys' singles: (Portugal) LI Tiago
- Cadet girls' singles: (Japan) Haruna Ojio
- Cadet boys' doubles: (Hong Kong) Baldwin Ho Wah Chan / CHAN Yee Shun
- Cadet girls' doubles: (Japan) Satsuki Odo / Yukari Sugasawa
- Cadet boys' team: (United States) Michael Minh Tran & Nikhil Kumar
- Cadet girls' team: (Hong Kong) NG Wing Lam & LEE Ka Yee

=== Premium events ===
- February 8–12: Czech Junior & Cadet Open in (Czech Republic) Hodonín

- Junior boys' singles: (Azerbaijan) Yang Xinyu
- Junior girls' singles: (Japan) Maki Shiomi
- Junior boys' doubles: (Poland) Artur Grela & Kamil Nalepa
- Junior girls' doubles: (Japan) Miyu Nagasaki & Maki Shiomi
- Cadet boys' singles: (Japan) Hiroto Shinozuka
- Cadet girls' singles: (South Korea) Byun Seoyoung
- Cadet boys' doubles: (Czech Republic) František Onderka & Radek Skála
- Cadet girls' doubles: (South Korea) Byun Seoyoung & Jung Dabin

- February 15–19: French Junior & Cadet Open in (France) Metz

- Junior boys' singles: (France) Bastien Rembert
- Junior girls' singles: (Azerbaijan) Ning Jing
- Junior boys' doubles: (France) Lilian Bardet & Irvin Bertrand
- Junior girls' doubles: (Japan) Miyu Nagasaki & Maki Shiomi
- Cadet boys' singles: (Japan) Jo Yokotani
- Cadet girls' singles: (Japan) Satsuki Odo
- Cadet boys' doubles: (Poland) Maciej Kubik & Samuel Kulczycki
- Cadet girls' doubles: (Hong Kong) Chau Wing Sze & Lee Ka Yee

- March 8–12: Italian Junior & Cadet Open in (Italy) Lignano

- Junior boys' singles: (Austria) Maciej Kołodziejczyk
- Junior girls' singles: (Germany) Jennie Wolf
- Junior boys' doubles: (Italy) Antonino Amato & Daniele Pinto
- Junior girls' doubles: (Serbia) Izabela Lupulesku & Sabina Šurjan
- Cadet boys' singles: (Hungary) Csaba András
- Cadet girls' singles: (United States) Rachel Sung
- Cadet boys' doubles: (Italy) Matteo Gualdi & John Oyebode
- Cadet girls' doubles: (France) Cloe Chomis & Lou Frété

- September 13–17: Croatia Junior & Cadet Open in Varaždin

- Junior boys' singles: (United States) Kanak Jha
- Junior girls' singles: (Croatia) SUN Jiayi
- Junior boys' doubles: (Chinese Taipei) FENG Yi-Hsin & TAI Ming-Wei
- Junior girls' doubles: (Croatia) SUN Jiayi & (Serbia) Sabina Šurjan
- Cadet boys' singles: (South Korea) YANG Ye-chan
- Cadet girls' singles: (Japan) Yukari Sugasawa
- Cadet boys' doubles: (South Korea) KIM Mun-su & KIM Tae-hyun
- Cadet girls' doubles: (Japan) Satsuki Odo & Yukari Sugasawa

- October 28 – November 1: India Junior & Cadet Open in Greater Noida

- Junior boys' singles: (India) Manav Vikash Thakkar
- Junior girls' singles: (Japan) Maki Shiomi
- Junior boys' doubles: (India) Manush Utpalbhai Shah & Manav Vikash Thakkar
- Junior girls' doubles: (South Korea) LEE Da-gyeong & LEE Seung-mi
- Cadet boys' singles: (Singapore) PANG Yew En
- Cadet girls' singles: (South Korea) LEE Da-gyeong

- November 8–12: Hungary Junior & Cadet Open in Szombathely

- Junior boys' singles: (Romania) Rares Sipos
- Junior girls' singles: (Serbia) Sabina Šurjan
- Junior boys' doubles: (Romania) Cristian Chirita & Rares Sipos
- Junior girls' doubles: (Serbia) Izabela Lupulesku & Sabina Šurjan
- Cadet boys' singles: (Chinese Taipei) LI Hsin-Yu
- Cadet girls' singles: (Russia) Elizabet Abraamian
- Cadet boys' doubles: (Chinese Taipei) LI Hsin-Yu & PENG Chih
- Cadet girls' doubles: (Chinese Taipei) CHIEN Tung-Chuan & HUANG Yu-Jie

=== Regular events ===
- February 22–26: Swedish Junior & Cadet Open in (Sweden) Örebro

- Junior boys' singles: (Japan) Shunsuke Togami
- Junior girls' singles: (Japan) Maki Shiomi
- Junior boys' doubles: (Japan) Kazuki Hamada & Shunsuke Togami
- Junior girls' doubles: (Japan) Maki Shiomi & (Hong Kong) Wong Chin Yau
- Cadet boys' singles: (France) Dorian Zheng
- Cadet girls' singles: (Hong Kong) Lee Ka Yee

- March 23–26: Paraguay Junior & Cadet Open in Asunción

- Junior boys' singles: (Brazil) Carlos Ishida
- Junior girls' singles: (Brazil) Beatriz Kimoto
- Cadet boys' singles: (Brazil) Kenzo Carmo
- Cadet girls' singles: (Chile) Valentina Ríos

- April 3–7: Tunisia Junior & Cadet Open in Radès

- Junior boys' singles: (Romania) Cristian Pletea
- Junior girls' singles: (Romania) Adina Diaconu
- Junior boys' doubles: (Romania) Cristian Pletea & Rares Sipos
- Junior girls' doubles: (Romania) Adina Diaconu & Andreea Dragoman
- Cadet boys' singles: (Italy) John Oyebode
- Cadet girls' singles: (Tunisia) Fadwa Garci

- April 8–11: Australian Junior & Cadet Open in (Australia) Tweed Heads

- Junior boys' singles: (Japan) Naoya Kawakami
- Junior girls' singles:
- Junior boys' doubles: (Japan) Naoya Kawakami & Shunsuke Tsukidate
- Junior girls' doubles: (Australia) Parleen Kaur & Danni-Elle Townsend
- Cadet boys' singles: (New Zealand) Nathan Xu
- Cadet girls' singles: (United States) Lavanya Maruthapandian
- Cadet boys' doubles: (Australia) Noah Kim & Finn Luu
- Cadet girls' doubles: (Australia) Sue Bin Oh & Cindy Suy

- April 19–23: Belgium Junior & Cadet Open in Spa

- Junior boys' singles: (France) Lilian Bardet
- Junior girls' singles: (Belgium) Lisa Lung
- Junior boys' doubles: (France) Lilian Bardet & Bastien Rembert
- Junior girls' doubles: (Belgium) Lisa Lung & (United States) Amy Wang
- Cadet boys' singles: (Belgium) Olav Kosolosky
- Cadet girls' singles: (United States) Amy Wang
- Cadet boys' doubles: (Republic of Ireland) Owen Cathcart & (Norway) Borgar Haug
- Cadet girls' doubles: (Thailand) Monsawan Saritapirak & (United States) Amy Wang

- May 17–21: Spanish Junior & Cadet Open in (Spain) Platja d'Aro

- Junior boys' singles: (Russia) Artur Abusev
- Junior girls' singles: (Japan) Maki Shiomi
- Junior boys' doubles: (Chinese Taipei) FENG Yi-Hsin, LI Hsin-Yang, & TAI Ming-Wei
- Junior girls' doubles: (Japan) Yuka Minagawa, Yumeno Soma, & Satsuki Odo
- Cadet boys' singles: (Chinese Taipei) FENG Yi-Hsin
- Cadet girls' singles: (Japan) Yumeno Soma
- Cadet boys' doubles: (Russia) Vladislav Makarov & Maksim Grebnev
- Cadet girls' doubles: (Russia) Ekaterina Zironova & Elizabet Abraamian

- June 1–4: Slovak Junior Open in (Slovakia) Senec
  - Junior boys' singles: (England) Luke Savill
  - Junior girls' singles: (Chinese Taipei) SU Pei-Ling
  - Junior boys' doubles: (Hungary) Patrik Juhasz & Istvan Molnar
  - Junior girls' doubles: (Chinese Taipei) CHEN Ting-Ting & SU Pei-Ling
- June 18–19: Argentina Junior Open in Buenos Aires
  - Junior boys' singles: (United States) Kanak Jha
  - Junior girls' singles: (United States) Amy Wang
- July 25–29: Jordan Junior & Cadet Open in Amman

- Junior boys' singles: (India) Snehit Suravajjula
- Junior girls' singles: (India) Yashini Sivasankar
- Junior boys' doubles: (India) Manush Utpalbhai Shah & Parth Virmani
- Junior girls' doubles: (Thailand) Nanapat Kola & Jinnipa Sawettabut
- Cadet boys' singles: (Chinese Taipei) HSU Po-Hsuan
- Cadet girls' singles: (Chinese Taipei) HUANG Yu-Jie
- Cadet boys' doubles: (Chinese Taipei) HSU Po-Hsuan & PENG Chih
- Cadet girls' doubles: (Chinese Taipei) CHEN Ci-Xuan & HUANG Yu-Jie

- August 16–20: El Salvador Junior & Cadet Open in San Salvador

- Junior boys' singles: (Panama) Jacobo Vahnish
- Junior girls' singles: (United States) Ishana Deb
- Junior boys' doubles: (Sweden) Oskar Danielsson & Oskar Hedlund
- Junior girls' doubles: (Guatemala) Paula Acevedo & Lucia Cordero
- Cadet boys' singles: (Panama) Jacobo Vahnish
- Cadet girls' singles: (Puerto Rico) Fabiola Diaz
- Mini Cadet boys' singles: (Puerto Rico) Angel Naranjo
- Mini Cadet girls' singles: (United States) Sarika Ahire
- Cadet boys' doubles: (Puerto Rico) Angel Naranjo & Jabdiel Torres
- Cadet girls' doubles: (Puerto Rico) Fabiola Diaz & Kassandra Maldonado

- September 20–24: Slovenia Junior & Cadet Open in Otočec

- Junior boys' singles: (India) Manav Vikash Thakkar
- Junior girls' singles: (Croatia) SUN Jiayi
- Junior boys' doubles: (India) Manush Utpalbhai Shah & Manav Vikash Thakkar
- Junior girls' doubles: (Japan) Satsuki Odo & Yukari Sugasawa
- Cadet boys' singles: (Republic of Ireland) Owen Cathcart
- Cadet girls' singles: (Romania) Elena Zaharia

- October 4–8: Serbia Junior & Cadet Open in Vrnjačka Banja

- Junior boys' singles: (United States) Sharon Alguetti
- Junior girls' singles: (Serbia) Sabina Šurjan
- Junior boys' doubles: (Canada) Jeremy Hazin & (Romania) Paul Mladin
- Junior girls' doubles: (Serbia) Tijana Jokić & Sabina Šurjan
- Cadet boys' singles: (Republic of Ireland) Owen Cathcart
- Cadet girls' singles: (Serbia) Radmila Tominjak
- Cadet boys' doubles: (Croatia) Ivor Ban & Filip Borovnjak
- Cadet girls' doubles: (Serbia) Reka Bezeg & Radmila Tominjak

- October 11–15: Egypt Junior & Cadet Open in Sharm El Sheikh

- Junior boys' singles: (Russia) Denis Ivonin
- Junior girls' singles: (India) Selena Selvakumar
- Junior boys' doubles: (France) Remi Menand & Bastien Rembert
- Junior girls' doubles: (Nigeria) Esther Oribamise & (India) Selena Selvakumar
- Cadet boys' singles: (Nigeria) Taiwo Mati
- Cadet girls' singles: (Egypt) Farida Badawy
- Cadet boys' doubles: (Egypt) Mohamed Azzam & (Tunisia) Youssef Ben Attia
- Cadet girls' doubles: (Tunisia) Fadwa Garci & (Egypt) Hana Mahmoud

- November 3–5: Slovak Cadet Open in (Slovakia) Bratislava
  - Cadet boys' singles: (Poland) Maciej Kubik
  - Cadet girls' singles: (Germany) Naomi Pranjkovic
  - Cadet boys' doubles: (Croatia) Ivor Ban & Filip Borovnjak
  - Cadet girls' doubles: (Romania) Ana Cristina Barbu & Diana Radu
- November 22–25: Portugal Junior & Cadet Open in Guimarães

- Junior boys' singles: (Thailand) Yanapong Panagitgun
- Junior girls' singles: (Belgium) Lisa Lung
- Junior boys' doubles: (Romania) Cristian Chirita & (Thailand) Yanapong Panagitgun
- Junior girls' doubles: (Iran) Mahshid Ashtari & Fatemeh Jamalifar
- Cadet boys' singles: (Japan) Yuma Tanigaki
- Cadet girls' singles: (Romania) Elena Zaharia
- Cadet boys' doubles: (Romania) Dragos Alexandru Bujor & Radu Andrei Miron
- Cadet girls' doubles: (Romania) Luciana Mitrofan & Elena Zaharia

=== Finals ===
- February 2–4, 2018: 2017 ITTF World Junior Circuit Finals in Luxembourg City

== Table tennis at multi-sport events ==
- May 17–22: 2017 Islamic Solidarity Games in Baku
  - Men's singles: (gold) (Iran) Noshad Alamian; (silver) (Iran) Nima Alamian; (bronze) (Qatar) Li Ping
  - Women's singles: (gold) (Turkey) Melek Hu; (silver) (Azerbaijan) Zhing Ning; (bronze) (Azerbaijan) Miao Wang
  - Men's team: (gold) Iran; (silver) Turkey; (bronze) Azerbaijan
  - Women's team: (gold) Iran; (silver) Azerbaijan; (bronze) Turkey
- June 24–30: 2017 Island Games in (Sweden) Gotland
  - Men's singles: (gold) (Gotland) Björn Axelsson; (silver) (Greenland) Ivik Nielsen; (bronze) (Guernsey) Garry Dodd; (bronze) (Gotland) Nisse Lundberg
  - Women's singles: (gold) (Åland) Marina Donner; (silver) (Faroe Islands) Henrietta Nielsen; (bronze) (Guernsey) Dawn Morgan; (bronze) (Gotland) Evelina Carlsson
  - Men's doubles: (gold) (Greenland) Ivik Nielsen & Aqqalu Nielsen; (silver) (Guernsey) Garry Dodd & Joshua Stacey; (bronze) (Jersey) Joshua Band & Jordan Wykes; (bronze) (Gotland) Niklas Ahlgren & Max Hedbom
  - Women's doubles: (gold) (Faroe Islands) Durita Fríðadóttir Jensen & Henrietta Nielsen; (silver) (Gotland) Annika Ahlgren & Lina Olofsson; (bronze) (Gotland) Evelina Carlsson & Elin Schwartz; (bronze) (Guernsey) Charlotte Casey & Daisy Kershaw
  - Mixed doubles: (gold) (Åland) Marina Donner & Johan Pettersson; (silver) (Gotland) Björn Axelsson & Evelina Carlsson; (bronze) (Jersey) Kelsey le Maistre & Jordan Wykes; (bronze) (Guernsey) Garry Dodd & Dawn Morgan
  - team: (gold) Guernsey; (silver) Greenland; (bronze) Åland Islands; (bronze) Gotland
- August 19–31: 2017 Southeast Asian Games in Kuala Lumpur
  - Men's singles: (gold) (Singapore) Gao Ning; (silver) (Singapore) Clarence Chew-Zhe Yu; (bronze) (Thailand) Padasak Tanviriyavechakul; (bronze) (Philippines) Richard Gonzales
  - Women's singles: (gold) (Singapore) Feng Tianwei; (silver) (Singapore) Zhou Yihan; (bronze) (Thailand) Nanthana Komwong; (bronze) (Thailand) Suthasini Sawettabut
  - Men's doubles: (gold) (Singapore) Gao Ning & Pang Xue Jie; (silver) (Singapore) Clarence Chew-Zhe Yu & Ethan Poh-Shao Feng; (bronze) (Indonesia) Ficky Supit Santoso & M. Bima Abdi Negara; (bronze) (Thailand) Padasak Tanviriyavechakul & Supanut Wisutmaythangkoon
  - Women's doubles: (gold) (Singapore) Feng Tianwei & Yu Mengyu; (silver) (Singapore) Lin Ye & Zhou Yihan; (bronze) (Indonesia) Gustin Dwijayanti & Lilis Indriani; (bronze) (Vietnam) Mai Hoàng Mỹ Trang & Nguyễn Thị Nga
  - Mixed doubles: (gold) (Thailand) Padasak Tanviriyavechakul & Suthasini Sawettabut; (silver) (Singapore) Pang Xue Jie & Yu Mengyu; (bronze) (Singapore) Clarence Chew-Zhe Yu & Zhou Yihan; (bronze) (Vietnam) Đinh Quang Linh & Mai Hoàng Mỹ Trang
  - Men's team: (gold) Vietnam; (silver) Singapore; (bronze) Malaysia; (bronze) Indonesia
  - Women's team: (gold) Singapore; (silver) Thailand; (bronze) Indonesia; (bronze) Malaysia
- August 22–29: 2017 Summer Universiade in Taipei
  - Men's singles: (gold) (Japan) Masataka Morizono; (silver) (Chinese Taipei) Chen Chien-an; (bronze) (North Korea) Pak Sin-hyok; (bronze) (France) Alexandre Robinot
  - Women's singles: (gold) (South Korea) Jeon Ji-hee; (silver) (Chinese Taipei) Cheng I-ching; (bronze) (North Korea) Kim Song-i; (bronze) (Romania) Bernadette Szőcs
  - Men's doubles: (gold) (Japan) Masataka Morizono & Yuya Oshima; (silver) (South Korea) Jang Woo-jin & Lim Jong-hoon; (bronze) (Chinese Taipei) Chen Chien-an & Chiang Hung-chieh; (bronze) (Chinese Taipei) Lee Chia-sheng & Liao Cheng-ting
  - Women's doubles: (gold) (Japan) Ayami Narumoto & Rei Yamamoto; (silver) (North Korea) Cha Hyo-sim & Kim Nam-hae; (bronze) (Japan) Minami Ando & Rika Suzuki; (bronze) (South Korea) Jeon Ji-hee & Lee Eun-hye
  - Mixed doubles: (gold) (South Korea) Jang Woo-jin & Jeon Ji-hee; (silver) (Japan) Kazuhiro Yoshimira & Minami Ando; (bronze) (Chinese Taipei) Liao Cheng-ting & Chen Szu-yu; (bronze) (North Korea) Pak Sin-hyok & Kim Nam-hae
  - Men's team: (gold) China; (silver) Japan; (bronze) Chinese Taipei; (bronze) South Korea
  - Women's team: (gold) South Korea; (silver) Japan; (bronze) Chinese Taipei; (bronze) China
- September 17–23: 2017 ASEAN Para Games in (Malaysia) Kuala Lumpur
  - Indonesia won the gold medal tally. Thailand won the overall medal tally.

== See also ==
- International Table Tennis Federation
- 2017 in sports
