= Table tennis at the Summer World University Games =

- Events: 7 (men: 3; women: 3; mixed: 1)

Games
- 1959; 1960; 1961; 1962; 1963; 1964; 1965; 1966; 1967; 1968; 1970; 1970; 1973; 1972; 1975; 1975; 1977; 1978; 1979; 1981; 1983; 1985; 1987; 1989; 1991; 1993; 1995; 1997; 1999; 2001; 2003; 2005; 2007; 2009; 2011; 2013; 2015; 2017; 2019; 2021; 2025

Table tennis competition has been part of the Universiade since 2001, with singles, doubles and team events for both men and women.

== Events ==
Event	01	07	09	11	13	15	17	19	21	25
Men's singles	•	•	•	•	•	•	•	•	•	•
Men's doubles	•	•	•	•	•	•	•	•	•	•
Men's team	•	•	•	•	•	•	•	•	•	•
Women's singles	•	•	•	•	•	•	•	•	•	•
Women's doubles	•	•	•	•	•	•	•	•	•	•
Women's team	•	•	•	•	•	•	•	•	•	•
Mixed doubles	•	•	•	•	•	•	•	•	•	•
Events	7	7	7	7	7	7	7	7	7	7

== Editions ==
Games	Year	Host city	Host country	Winner	Second	Third
XXI	2001	Beijing	China	China	South Korea	Chinese Taipei
XXIV	2007	Bangkok	Thailand	China	Chinese Taipei	Japan
XXV	2009	Beograd	Serbia	China	Chinese Taipei	Japan
XXVI	2011	Shenzhen	China	China	Japan	Chinese Taipei
XXVII	2013	Kazan	Russia	China	Chinese Taipei	Japan
XXVIII	2015	Gwangju	South Korea	China	Chinese Taipei	Japan
XXVIX	2017	Taipei	Taiwan	Japan	South Korea	China
XXX	2019	Naples	Italy	China	Japan	Chinese Taipei
XXXI	2021	Chengdu	China	China	Japan	Chinese Taipei
XXXII	2025	Essen	Germany	China	Japan	Chinese Taipei

== Medal table ==
Last updated after the 2025 Summer World University Games

Rank	Nation	Gold	Silver	Bronze	Total
1	China (CHN)	50	24	26	100
2	Japan (JPN)	8	21	29	58
3	Chinese Taipei (TPE)	7	15	22	44
4	South Korea (KOR)	4	5	14	23
5	Individual Neutral Athletes (AIN)	1	1	0	2
6	Hong Kong (HKG)	1	0	6	7
7	Russia (RUS)	0	2	10	12
8	France (FRA)	0	2	9	11
9	North Korea (PRK)	0	1	5	6
10	Germany (GER)	0	0	6	6
11	Romania (ROU)	0	0	5	5
12	Thailand (THA)	0	0	2	2
13	Belarus (BLR)	0	0	1	1
13	Czech Republic (CZE)	0	0	1	1
13	Egypt (EGY)	0	0	1	1
13	Serbia (SRB)	0	0	1	1
13	Spain (ESP)	0	0	1	1
13	Turkey (TUR)	0	0	1	1
13	Ukraine (UKR)	0	0	1	1
13	United States (USA)	0	0	1	1
Totals (20 entries)		71	71	142	284
