= Unified Korean sporting teams =

Sporting teams representing the Korean Peninsula

Korea Team
- Korean Unification Flag
- Events: 1991 WTTC; 1991 FIFA WYC; 2018 WTTC; 2018 Winter Olympics; 2018 Korea Open; 2018 Asian Games; 2018 Asian Para Games; 2019 IHF WC
- IOC code: COR
- NOCs: Korean Sport & Olympic Committee, Olympic Committee of the Democratic People's Republic of Korea
- Other related appearances North Korea; South Korea

International medals

World Table Tennis Championships
Gold medal – first place	1991 Chiba	Women's team
Silver medal – second place	1991 Chiba	Women's singles
Bronze medal – third place	1991 Chiba	Men's singles
Bronze medal – third place	1991 Chiba	Mixed doubles
Bronze medal – third place	2018 Sweden	Women's team

Asian Games
Gold medal – first place	2018 Jakarta–Palembang	Women's Canoe TBR 500 meters
Bronze medal – third place	2018 Jakarta–Palembang	Women's Canoe TBR 200 meters
Bronze medal – third place	2018 Jakarta–Palembang	Men's Canoe TBR 1000 meters

ITTF World Tour
Gold medal – first place	2018 Korea Open	Mixed doubles
Bronze medal – third place	2018 Korea Open	Men's doubles

A unified team of North and South Korea has played at certain sports competitions under the name Korea (코리아).

== History ==
Since the conclusion of the Korean War, North and South Korea have existed as separate countries, with both claiming to be the sole legitimate government of all Korea. Both nations participate in international sport as individual countries; unified teams are exceptions to this practice rather than the norm. Joint teams have been seen as geopolitical gestures.

A unified team under the name Korea (KOR) competed in 1991 World Table Tennis Championships and FIFA World Youth Championship with athletes from both North and South Korea. In 1991, the team used the Unification Flag and the anthem "Arirang".

At the 2018 Winter Olympics in Pyeongchang in South Korea, the Koreas marched together at the Parade of Nations under the Unification Flag. A unified team played in the women's ice hockey tournament as Korea under the IOC country code COR, using the Unification Flag and the "Arirang" anthem. For other disciplines, the two Koreas retained separate national teams. At the 2018 World Team Table Tennis Championships, the two Koreas entered separate teams, but when they were paired against each other at the quarter-final of the women's event, they negotiated instead to field a joint team for the semifinal, with the agreement of the International Table Tennis Federation.

The two Koreas also initially agreed to form a unified Korea team at the 2018 East Asian Judo Championships in Mongolia. Plans to compete under a unified flag were eventually scrapped due to a dispute over the flag.

Four unified teams also participated in the international table tennis event, 2018 Korea Open. The unified Korean women's doubles team won gold, the first gold medal won by a unified Korean team since the 1991 World Table Tennis Championships, while the unified men's doubles team won bronze.

FIBA allowed the participation of unified Korean team at the 2019 FIBA Women's Asia Cup. However, no unified Korean team entered the basketball tournament.

== Records ==
=== Multi-sport events ===
==== 2018 Winter Olympics ====
Games	Athletes	Gold	Silver	Bronze	Total
(South Korea) 2018 Pyeongchang	35	0	0	0	0
Total		0	0	0	0

==== 2018 Asian Games ====
Games	Athletes	Gold	Silver	Bronze	Total
(Indonesia) 2018 Jakarta–Palembang	60	1	1	2	4
Total		1	1	2	4

==== 2018 Asian Para Games ====
Games	Athletes	Gold	Silver	Bronze	Total
(Indonesia) 2018 Jakarta	12	0	1	1	2
Total		0	1	1	2

=== Single sports events ===
==== World Table Tennis Championships ====
Games	Athletes	Gold	Silver	Bronze	Total
(Japan) 1991 Chiba	22	1	1	2	4
2018 Sweden	5	0	0	1	1
Total		1	1	3	5

==== ITTF World Tour ====
Games	Athletes	Gold	Silver	Bronze	Total
(South Korea) 2018 Korea Open	8	1	0	1	2
Total		1	0	1	2

=== Single sport team tournaments ===
==== FIFA World Youth Championship ====
Games	Athletes	Gold	Silver	Bronze	Total
1991 Portugal	18	0	0	0	0
Total		0	0	0	0

==== World Men's Handball Championship ====
Games	Round	Position	Pld	W	D	L	GF	GA	GD
2019 Denmark/Germany	Match for 21st place	22nd of 24	7	1	0	6	177	216	–39
Total		22nd place	7	1	0	6	177	216	–39

== Names ==
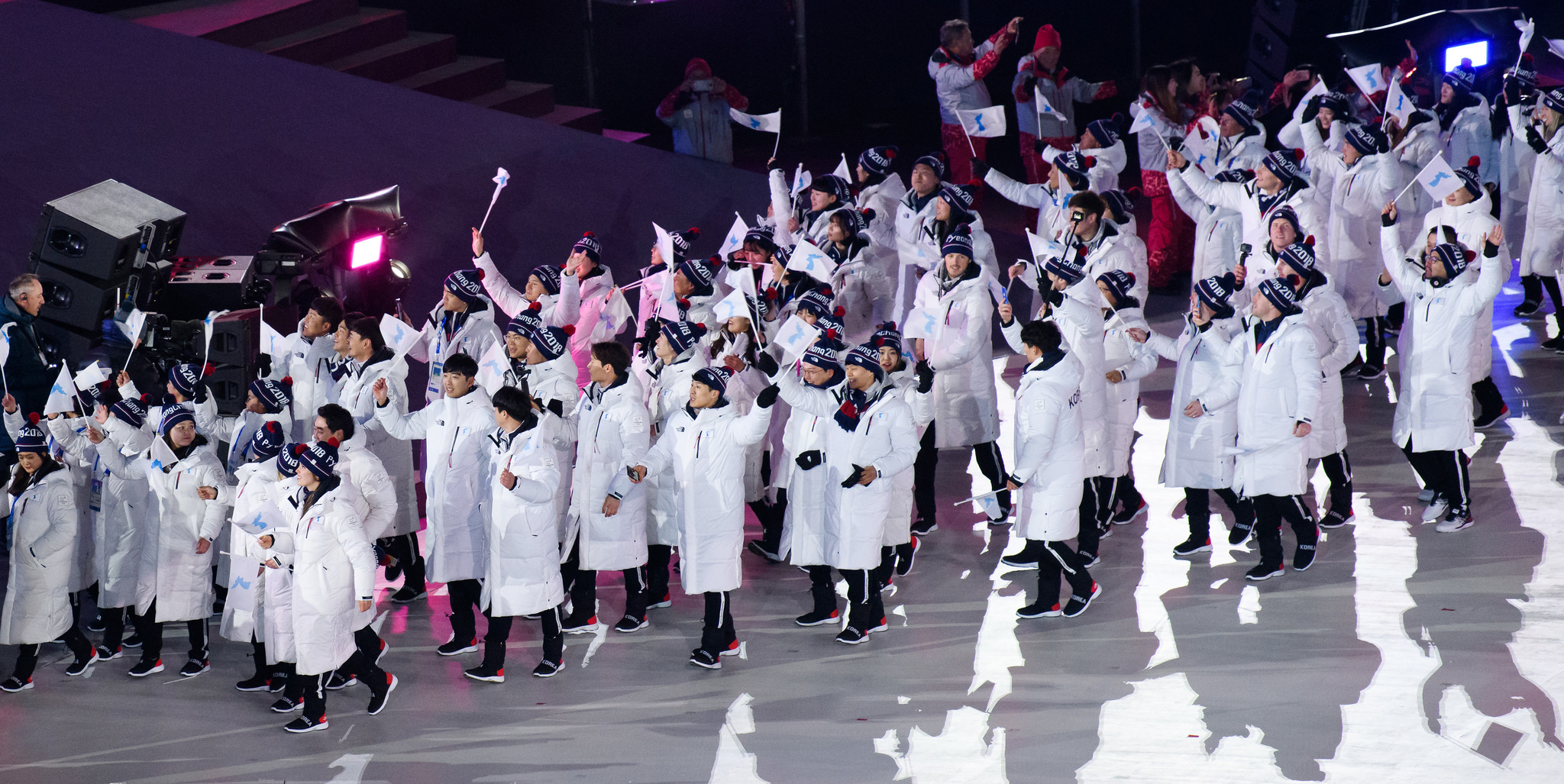
The unified Korean team at the 2018 Winter Olympics opening ceremony

In English, the team is named Korea, a term shared between North Korea and South Korea.

In East Asian languages where the names of the countries are significantly different (North Korea's 조선/朝鮮/Chosŏn versus South Korea's 한국/韓國/Hanguk), the team name uses an English transliteration. For example, during the 2018 Winter Olympics in South Korea, the team used the name 코리아 Koria; and during the 1991 World Table Tennis Championships in Japan, the team used the name コリア Koria.

During the 2007 Asian Winter Games opening ceremony in China where North and South Korea marched together, their placard displayed only the English name "Korea", with no Chinese-language name present. All other teams' placards displayed an English-language name over a Chinese-language name. The parade order was unaffected as it used English alphabetical order. There were no announcers present to call out the names of any of the teams, only commentators.

At both the 2000 Summer Olympics opening ceremony and the 2004 Summer Olympics opening ceremony, the two teams marched together under the name of "Korea" and the KOR tag. On both occasions, the two countries competed separately.

During the 2005 East Asian Games opening ceremony in Macau, North and South Korea also marched together and their placard displayed the English name "Korea".

== See also ==
- Korea national under-20 football team
- Korea women's national basketball team
- Korea men's national handball team
- Korea women's national ice hockey team
- Korea
- North Korea–South Korea relations
- United Team of Germany
