= 2018 ITTF Challenge Series =

ITTF Challenge Series
Tournament details
- Dates: 13 March 2018 – 18 November 2018
- Edition: 2nd

The 2018 ITTF Challenge Series was the second season of the International Table Tennis Federation's secondary professional table tennis tour, a level below the ITTF World Tour.

== Schedule ==
Below is the schedule released by the ITTF:

Tour	Event	Location	Venue	Date		Prize money (USD)	Ref.
Tour	Event	Location	Venue	Start	Finish	Prize money (USD)	Ref.
1	(Poland) Polish Open	Spała	Spała Olympic Center	March 13	March 17	40,000	
2	(Spain) Spanish Open	Guadalajara	Palacio Multiusos de Guadalajara	March 28	April 1	40,000	
3	Slovenia Open	Otočec	Otočec Sports Centre	April 2	April 6	40,000	
4	(Croatia) Zagreb Open	Zagreb	Zagreb Hall of Sports	May 2	May 6	40,000	
5	Thailand Open	Bangkok	Fashion Island - Island Hall	May 16	May 20	40,000	
6	(North Korea) Pyongyang Open	Pyongyang	Pyongyang Table Tennis Hall	June 13	June 17	40,000	
7	(Nigeria) Nigerian Open	Lagos	Sir Molade Okoya-Thomas Indoor Hall	August 8	August 12	46,000	
8	Belgium Open	De Haan	Sport en Recreatiecentrum Haneveld	October 23	October 27	40,000	
9	Belarus Open	Minsk	Palace of Tennis	November 13	November 18	40,000	

== Winners ==
Event	Men's singles	Women's singles	Men's doubles	Women's doubles	U21 Men's singles	U21 Women's singles
(Poland) Polish Open	(South Korea) Lim Jong-hoon	(South Korea) Yang Ha-eun	(South Korea) Jung Young-sik (South Korea) Lee Sang-su	(South Korea) Jeon Ji-hee (South Korea) Yang Ha-eun	(Poland) Marek Badowski	(South Korea) Kim Ji-ho
(Spain) Spanish Open	(South Korea) Kim Min-hyeok	(Japan) Saki Shibata	(South Korea) An Jae-hyun (South Korea) Cho Seung-min	(Japan) Honoka Hashimoto (Japan) Hitomi Sato	(South Korea) Cho Seung-min	(Japan) Saki Shibata
Slovenia Open	(Japan) Mizuki Oikawa	(Japan) Miyu Kato	(Poland) Marek Badowski (Poland) Patryk Zatowka	(Hong Kong) Ng Wing Nam (Hong Kong) Soo Wai Yam	(Hungary) Bence Majoros	(Japan) Saki Shibata
(Croatia) Zagreb Open	(Greece) Panagiotis Gionis	(Japan) Saki Shibata	(Hungary) Adam Szudi (Hungary) Nandor Ecseki	(Japan) Honoka Hashimoto (Japan) Hitomi Sato	(Denmark) Anders Lind	(Japan) Saki Shibata
Thailand Open	(China) Xu Ruifeng	(China) Liu Shiwen	(Germany) Tobias Hippler (Germany) Kilian Ort	(Thailand) Orawan Paranang (Thailand) Suthasini Sawettabut	(Japan) Yuta Tanaka	(Japan) Saki Shibata
(North Korea) Pyongyang Open	(North Korea) Pak Sin-hyok	(North Korea) Kim Song-i	(China) Ji Jiale (China) Liu Yebo	(North Korea) Cha Hyo-sim (North Korea) Kim Nam-hae	(China) Cao Wei	(China) Guo Yuhan
(Nigeria) Nigerian Open	(Nigeria) Quadri Aruna	(China) Guo Yan	(France) Alexandre Robinot (France) Joe Seyfried	(China) Qi Fenjie (China) Sun Chen	(Japan) Wang Shaobo	(China) Guo Yan
(Belgium) Belgian Open	(South Korea) Park Gang-hyeon	(Japan) Saki Shibata	(South Korea) An Jae-hyun (South Korea) Cho Seung-min	(Japan) Satsuki Odo (Japan) Saki Shibata	(Japan) Shunsuke Togami	(South Korea) Kim You-jin
Belarus Open	(China) Zhao Zihao	(Japan) Saki Shibata	(Japan) Kakeru Sone (Japan) Yuta Tanaka	(Japan) Satsuki Odo (Japan) Saki Shibata	(China) Zhao Zihao	(China) He Aige

== See also ==
- 2018 World Team Table Tennis Championships
- 2018 ITTF World Tour
- 2018 in table tennis
