= 2018 Korea Open =

2018 Korea Open may refer to:

- 2018 Korea Open (badminton)
- 2018 Korea Open (table tennis)
- 2018 Korea Open (tennis)

== See also ==
- Korea Open (disambiguation)
