= Nigeria Open =

Nigeria Open may refer to"

- National Open University of Nigeria
- Nigeria Open (table tennis)
