= Shang Kun =

Chinese table tennis player

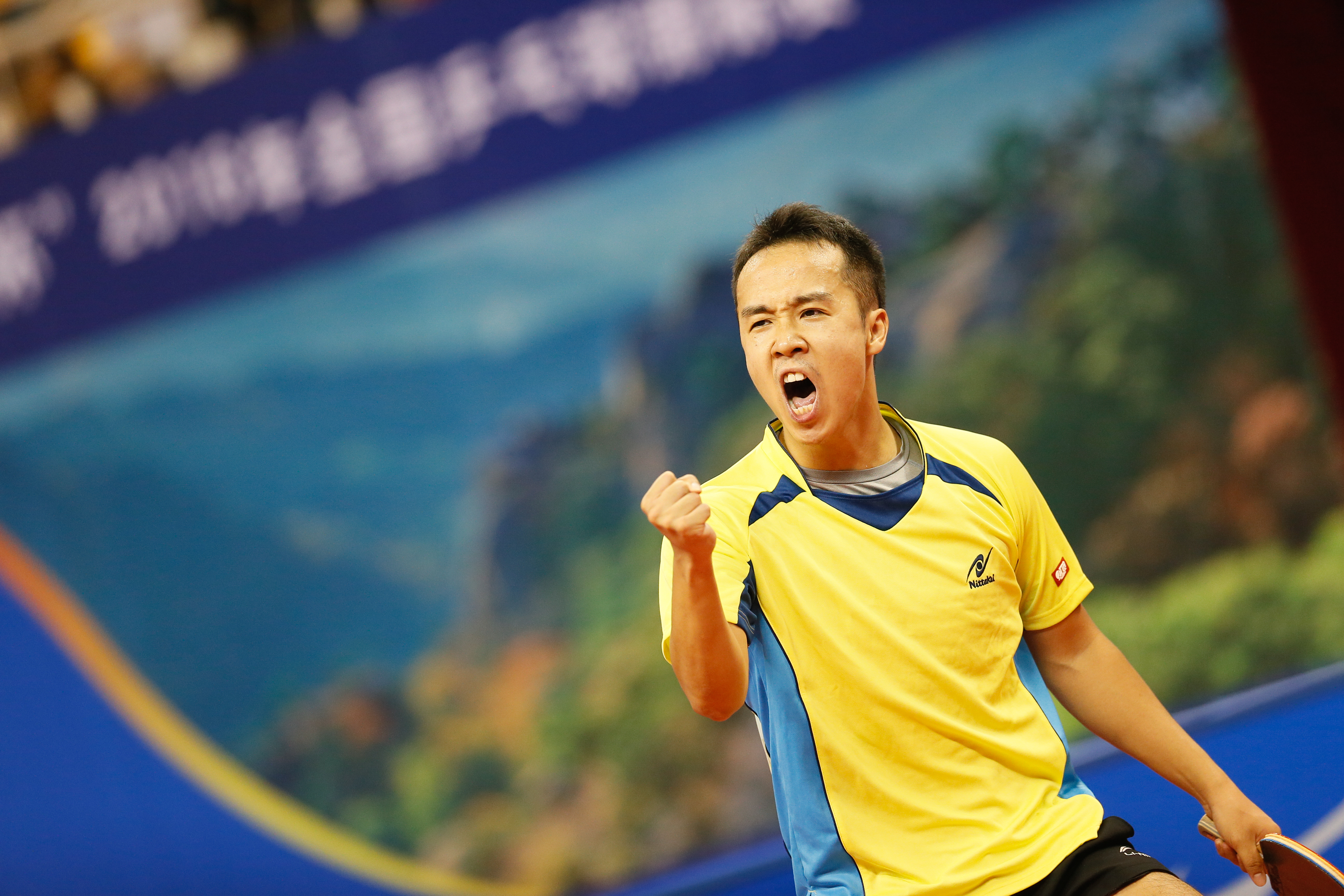
- Shang at the 2016 All China Table Tennis Championships

Personal information
- Born: 21 November 1990 (age 35) Yongji, Shanxi, China

Sport
- Sport: Table tennis
- Club: 1. FC Saarbrücken (Bundesliga)
- Playing style: Left-handed shakehand grip
- Highest ranking: 45 (April 2017)
Medal record
Representing China
Universiade
Gold medal – first place	2011 Shanzhen	Mixed doubles
Gold medal – first place	2011 Shanzhen	Men's team
Gold medal – first place	2013 Kazan	Men's team
Silver medal – second place	2013 Kazan	Men's singles
Bronze medal – third place	2011 Shanzhen	Men's doubles

Shang Kun (Chinese: 尚坤; pinyin: Shàng Kūn, born 21 November 1990) is a Chinese table tennis player.

== Achievements ==
=== ITTF Tours ===
Men's singles

Year	Tournament	Level	Final opponent	Score	Rank
2017	Hungarian Open	World Tour	Yan An	2–4	2nd place, silver medalist(s)
