= Kenji Matsudaira =

Japanese table tennis player

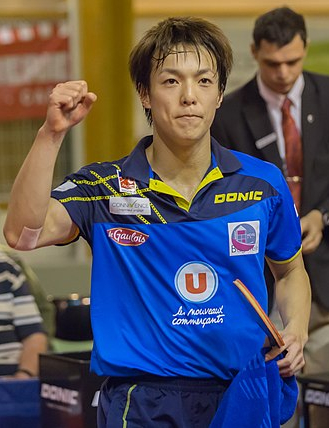
- Matsudaira playing for the French club Vaillante Angers in 2014

Personal information
- Born: 6 April 1989 (age 37) Nanao, Ishikawa, Japan

Sport
- Sport: Table tennis
- Playing style: Right-handed shakehand grip
- Highest ranking: 34 (May 2012)
Medal record
Representing Japan
World Championships
Bronze medal – third place	2012 Dortmund	Men's team
Universiade
Silver medal – second place	2011 Shenzhen	Men's team
Bronze medal – third place	2009 Belgrade	Mixed doubles
Bronze medal – third place	2009 Belgrade	Men's team
Bronze medal – third place	2011 Shenzhen	Men's singles
Bronze medal – third place	2011 Shenzhen	Men's doubles

Kenji Matsudaira (松平 賢二, Matsudaira Kenji; born 6 April 1989) is a Japanese table tennis player.

Kenji is the second of four children. His siblings, including younger brother Kenta, are all professional table tennis players.

== Achievements ==
=== ITTF Tours ===
Men's doubles

Year	Tournament	Level	Partner	Final opponents	Score	Rank
2012	Spanish Open	World Tour	Jun Mizutani	Yang Zi; Zhan Jian	4–2	1st place, gold medalist(s)
2017	Thailand Open	Challenge	Jin Ueda	Gao Ning; Pang Xuejie	3–0	1st place, gold medalist(s)
