= Table tennis at the 2017 Island Games =

- Dates: June 24 – 30
- Host city: Gotland, Sweden
- Venue: Södervärnshallen, Visby
- Level: Senior
- Events: 6
- Participation: 81 athletes from 14 nations

Table tennis, for the 2017 Island Games, held at the Södervärnshallen, Visby, Gotland, Sweden in June 2017.

100 competitors from 14 islands will compete in 6 events.

== General ==
Table tennis has appeared as an event in the Island Games in every year except in 2013, Gotland has led the medals table over the years.

Guernsey has named a team of eight, four men and four women.

== Medal table ==
* Host nation (Gotland)

Rank	Nation	Gold	Silver	Bronze	Total
1	Åland	2	0	1	3
2	Gotland*	1	2	5	8
3	Greenland	1	2	0	3
4	Guernsey	1	1	4	6
5	Faroe Islands	1	1	0	2
6	Jersey	0	0	2	2
Totals (6 entries)		6	6	12	24

== Results ==
Event	Gold	Silver	Bronze
Men's singles	Björn Axelsson (Gotland)	Ivik Nielsen (Greenland)	Garry Dodd (Guernsey)
Men's singles	Björn Axelsson (Gotland)	Ivik Nielsen (Greenland)	Nisse Lundberg (Gotland)
Men's doubles	Greenland; Aqqalu Nielsen; Ivik Nielsen	Guernsey; Garry Dodd; Joshua Stacy	Jersey; Joshua Band; Jordan Wykes
Men's doubles	Greenland; Aqqalu Nielsen; Ivik Nielsen	Guernsey; Garry Dodd; Joshua Stacy	Gotland; Niklas Ahlgren; Max Hedbom
Women's singles	Marina Donner (Aland)	Henrietta Nielsen (Faroe Islands)	Dawn Morgan (Guernsey)
Women's singles	Marina Donner (Aland)	Henrietta Nielsen (Faroe Islands)	Evelina Carlsson (Gotland)
Women's doubles	Faroe Islands; Durita Fríðadóttir Jensen; Henrietta Nielsen	Gotland; Annika Ahlgren; Lina Olofsson	Gotland; Eveline Carlsson; Elin Schwartz
Women's doubles	Faroe Islands; Durita Fríðadóttir Jensen; Henrietta Nielsen	Gotland; Annika Ahlgren; Lina Olofsson	Guernsey; Charlotte Casey; Daisy Kershaw
Mixed doubles	Åland Islands; Marina Donner; Johan Pettersson	Gotland; Eveline Carlsson; Björn Axelsson	Jersey; Kelsey Le Maistre; Jordan Wykes
Mixed doubles	Åland Islands; Marina Donner; Johan Pettersson	Gotland; Eveline Carlsson; Björn Axelsson	Guernsey; Dawn Morgan; Garry Dodd
Team	Guernsey; Charlotte Casey; Garry Dodd; Ben Foss; Daisy Kershaw; Samantha Kershw; Dawn Morgan; Joshua Stacey; Lawrence Stacey	Greenland; Melissa Larsen; Karlinannguaq Lundblad; Aqqalu Nielsen; Ivik Nielsen; Poul-Jørgen Petersen; Rosa-Marie Petersen	Åland Islands; Jim Bergbo; Marina Donner; Johan Lindholm; Johan Pettersson; Lucas Stenius
Team	Guernsey; Charlotte Casey; Garry Dodd; Ben Foss; Daisy Kershaw; Samantha Kershw; Dawn Morgan; Joshua Stacey; Lawrence Stacey	Greenland; Melissa Larsen; Karlinannguaq Lundblad; Aqqalu Nielsen; Ivik Nielsen; Poul-Jørgen Petersen; Rosa-Marie Petersen	Gotland; Annika Ahlgren; Niklas Ahlgren; Björn Axelsson; Evelina Carlsson; Max Hedbom; Nisse Lundberg; Lina Olofsson; Elin Schwartz

== See also ==
- 2017 in table tennis
