= Yuka Ishigaki =

Japanese table tennis player (born 1989)

Personal information
- Born: 22 July 1989 (age 37) Nagoya, Aichi, Japan
- Height: 159 cm (5 ft 3 in)
- Weight: 55 kg (121 lb)

Sport
- Sport: Table tennis
- Club: Nissay Red Elf
- Playing style: Right-handed shakehand grip
- Highest ranking: 19 (September 2015)
Medal record
Representing Japan
World Championships
Silver medal – second place	2014 Tokyo	Team
Universiade
Gold medal – first place	2013 Kazan	Women's team
Silver medal – second place	2009 Belgrade	Women's singles
Silver medal – second place	2011 Shenzhen	Mixed doubles
Silver medal – second place	2011 Shenzhen	Women's team
Bronze medal – third place	2009 Belgrade	Women's team
Bronze medal – third place	2013 Kazan	Women's singles
Bronze medal – third place	2013 Kazan	Women's doubles

Yuka Ishigaki (石垣 優香, Ishigaki Yuka; born 22 July 1989) is a Japanese table tennis player who plays a defensive, chopping style.

Ishigaki has won singles titles at the 2010 Egypt Open and the 2016 Bulgaria Open, and a women's doubles crown at the 2010 Japan Open.
