= Korea Open =

Korea Open may refer to:

- Korea Open (badminton), an annual badminton tournament
- Korea Open (golf), men's professional golf tournament
- Korea Open (tennis), a WTA tennis tournament
- Korea Open (table tennis), an ITTF table tennis tournament
- Korean Open (darts), a darts tournament
- Korean Open (ballroom dancing), an annual ballroom dancing tournament
