= Jin Ueda =

Japanese table tennis player

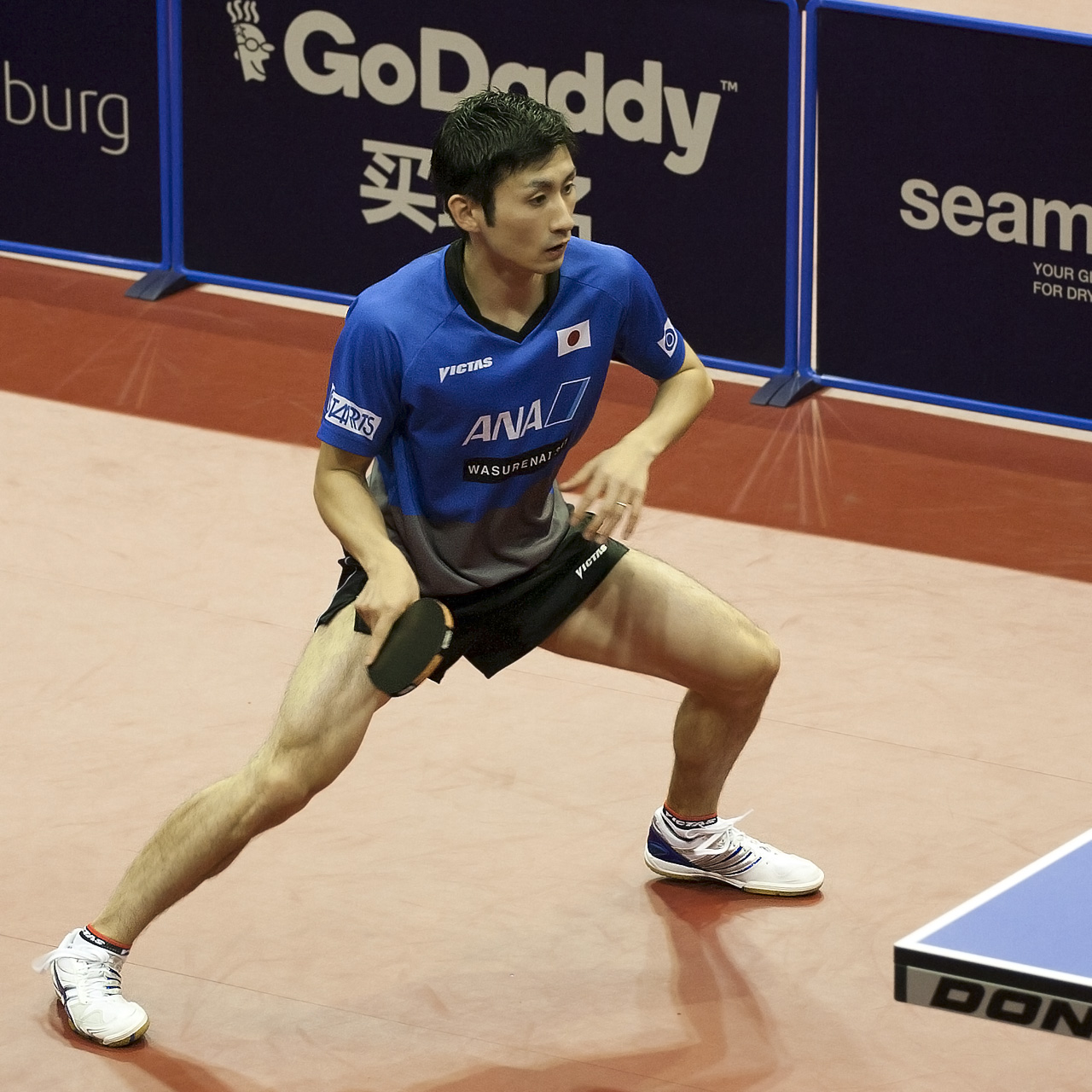
- Ueda at the 2017 German Open

Personal information
- Born: 10 December 1991 (age 34) Maizuru, Kyoto, Japan
- Height: 171 cm (5 ft 7 in)

Sport
- Sport: Table tennis
- Club: Okayama Rivets
- Playing style: Right-handed shakehand grip
- Highest ranking: 23 (May 2018)
Medal record
Representing Japan
Universiade
Silver medal – second place	2011 Shenzhen	Men's team
Silver medal – second place	2013 Kazan	Men's team
Silver medal – second place	2015 Gwangju	Men's team
Bronze medal – third place	2011 Shenzhen	Men's doubles

Jin Ueda (上田 仁, Ueda Jin; born 10 December 1991) is a Japanese table tennis player.

== Achievements ==
=== ITTF Tours ===
Men's singles

Year	Tournament	Level	Final opponents	Score	Rank
2014	U.S. Open		Tao Wenzhang	1–4	2nd place, silver medalist(s)
2017	Thailand Open	Challenge	Gao Ning	4–1	1st place, gold medalist(s)

Men's doubles

Year	Tournament	Level	Partner	Final opponents	Score	Rank
2013	Japan Open	World Tour	Maharu Yoshimura	Kenta Matsudaira; Koki Niwa	3–1	1st place, gold medalist(s)
2017	Thailand Open	Challenge	Kenji Matsudaira	Gao Ning; Pang Xuejie	3–0	1st place, gold medalist(s)
2017	China Open	World Tour	Maharu Yoshimura	Tomokazu Harimoto; Yuto Kizukuri	3–1	1st place, gold medalist(s)
2017	Bulgaria Open	World Tour	Maharu Yoshimura	Soumyajit Ghosh; Sathiyan Gnanasekaran	3–2	1st place, gold medalist(s)
2017	Czech Open	World Tour	Maharu Yoshimura	Patrick Franziska; Jonathan Groth	1–3	2nd place, silver medalist(s)
2017	Austrian Open	World Tour	Koki Niwa	Ruwen Filus; Ricardo Walther	3–1	1st place, gold medalist(s)

Mixed doubles

Year	Tournament	Level	Partner	Final opponents	Score	Rank
2014	U.S. Open		Yuko Fujii	Hidetoshi Oya; Yu Amano	4–0	1st place, gold medalist(s)
