= Table tennis at the 2011 Summer Universiade =

Table tennis was contested at the 2011 Summer Universiade from August 13 to August 20 at the Shenzhen Bay Sport Center Gym in Shenzhen, China. Men's and women's singles, men's, women's, and mixed doubles, and men's and women's team events were contested.

== Medal summary ==
=== Medal table ===
Rank	Nation	Gold	Silver	Bronze	Total
1	China (CHN)	7	3	4	14
2	Japan (JPN)	0	3	2	5
3	Chinese Taipei (TPE)	0	1	3	4
4	South Korea (KOR)	0	0	2	2
5	Czech Republic (CZE)	0	0	1	1
5	France (FRA)	0	0	1	1
5	Romania (ROU)	0	0	1	1
Totals (7 entries)		7	7	14	28

=== Events ===
Event	Gold	Silver	Bronze
Men's singles	Xu Xin; China	Yan An; China	Fang Bo; China
Men's singles	Xu Xin; China	Yan An; China	Kenji Matsudaira; Japan
Women's singles	Rao Jingwen; China	Fan Ying; China	Ma Yuefei; China
Women's singles	Rao Jingwen; China	Fan Ying; China	Xiong Xinyun; China
Men's doubles	China (CHN); Xu Xin; Yan An	Chinese Taipei (TPE); Wang Yitse; Chen Chien-An	China (CHN); Shang Kun; Fang Bo
Men's doubles	China (CHN); Xu Xin; Yan An	Chinese Taipei (TPE); Wang Yitse; Chen Chien-An	Japan (JPN); Jin Ueda; Kenji Matsudaira
Women's doubles	China (CHN); Ma Yuefei; Rao Jingwen	China (CHN); Xiong Xinyun; Tang Liying	Czech Republic (CZE); Iveta Vacenovska; Dana Hadačová
Women's doubles	China (CHN); Ma Yuefei; Rao Jingwen	China (CHN); Xiong Xinyun; Tang Liying	South Korea (KOR); Jee Min Hyung; Moon Mi-Ra
Mixed doubles	China (CHN); Shang Kun; Rao Jingwen	Japan (JPN); Kentaro Miuchi; Yuka Ishigaki	South Korea (KOR); Lee Jae Hun; Kim So Ri
Mixed doubles	China (CHN); Shang Kun; Rao Jingwen	Japan (JPN); Kentaro Miuchi; Yuka Ishigaki	Chinese Taipei (TPE); Huang Sheng-sheng; Huang Yi-hua
Men's team	China (CHN); Fang Bo; Hu Bingtao; Shang Kun; Xu Xin; Yan An	Japan (JPN); Ryusuke Karube; Hiromitsu Kasahara; Kenji Matsudaira; Kentaro Miuchi; Jin Ueda	Chinese Taipei (TPE); Chen Chien-An; Fu Enti; Huang Sheng-sheng; Shen Chimin; Wang Yitse
Men's team	China (CHN); Fang Bo; Hu Bingtao; Shang Kun; Xu Xin; Yan An	Japan (JPN); Ryusuke Karube; Hiromitsu Kasahara; Kenji Matsudaira; Kentaro Miuchi; Jin Ueda	France (FRA); Thomas le Breton; Emmanuel Lebesson; Adrien Mattenet; Abdel-Kader Salifou
Women's team	China (CHN); Fan Ying; Ma Yuefei; Rao Jingwen; Tang Liying; Xiong Xinyun	Japan (JPN); Yuko Fujii; Yuka Ishigaki; Marina Matsuzawa; Shiho Ono; Yuri Yamanashi	Romania (ROU); Ioana Ghemes; Elisabeta Samara; Anamaria Sebe
Women's team	China (CHN); Fan Ying; Ma Yuefei; Rao Jingwen; Tang Liying; Xiong Xinyun	Japan (JPN); Yuko Fujii; Yuka Ishigaki; Marina Matsuzawa; Shiho Ono; Yuri Yamanashi	Chinese Taipei (TPE); Chen Szu-yu; Cheng I-Ching; Huang Yi-hua; Lee I-Chen; Liu Hsing-Yin
