= Table tennis at the 2009 Summer Universiade =

Sports competition

The Table tennis competition in the 2009 Summer Universiade were held in Belgrade, Serbia.

== Medal overview ==
Event	Gold	Silver	Bronze
Men's Singles	Chiang Hung-Chieh (TPE)	Hidetoshi Oya (JPN)	Oleksandr Didukh (UKR)
Men's Singles	Chiang Hung-Chieh (TPE)	Hidetoshi Oya (JPN)	Adrien Mattenet (FRA)
Men's Doubles	China (CHN); Cui Qinglei; Li Yang	France (FRA); Emmanuel Lebesson; Adrien Mattenet	Serbia (SRB); Marko Jevtović; Žolt Pete
Men's Doubles	China (CHN); Cui Qinglei; Li Yang	France (FRA); Emmanuel Lebesson; Adrien Mattenet	Japan (JPN); Hidetoshi Oya; Yuichi Yokoyama
Men's Team	China (CHN); Xu Xin; Cui Qinglei; Wang Zhen; Jin Yixiong; Li Yang	France (FRA); Abdel Kader Salifou; Adrien Mattenet; Emmanuel Lebesson; Clement Debruyeres	Germany (GER); Nico Christ; Nico Stehle; Lennart Wehking
Men's Team	China (CHN); Xu Xin; Cui Qinglei; Wang Zhen; Jin Yixiong; Li Yang	France (FRA); Abdel Kader Salifou; Adrien Mattenet; Emmanuel Lebesson; Clement Debruyeres	Japan (JPN); Masato Shiono; Yuichi Yokoyama; Hidetoshi Oya; Jun Mizutani; Kenji Matsudaira
Women's Singles	Tang Liying (CHN)	Yuri Yamanashi (JPN)	Huang Yi-Hua (TPE)
Women's Singles	Tang Liying (CHN)	Yuri Yamanashi (JPN)	Moemi Terui (JPN)
Women's Doubles	China (CHN); Cai Shanshan; Dai Ningyang	China (CHN); Liu Juan; Ma Yuefei	South Korea (KOR); Kim So Ri; Seo Hyo Young
Women's Doubles	China (CHN); Cai Shanshan; Dai Ningyang	China (CHN); Liu Juan; Ma Yuefei	Japan (JPN); Moemi Terui; Yuri Yamanashi
Women's Team	China (CHN); Dai Ningyang; Liu Juan; Tang Liying; Cai Shanshan; Ma Yuefei	Russia (RUS); Yulia Prokhorova; Valentina Sabitova; Margarita Fetiyukhina; Elena Troshneva; Polina Mikhailova	France (FRA); Carole Grundisch; Audrey Mattenet; Marine Zanardi; Li Xue
Women's Team	China (CHN); Dai Ningyang; Liu Juan; Tang Liying; Cai Shanshan; Ma Yuefei	Russia (RUS); Yulia Prokhorova; Valentina Sabitova; Margarita Fetiyukhina; Elena Troshneva; Polina Mikhailova	Japan (JPN); Yuri Yamanashi; Moemi Terui; Misako Wakamiy; Yuka Ishigaki; Yuko Fujii
Mixed Doubles	Chinese Taipei (TPE); Chiang Hung-Chieh; Huang Yi-Hua	Chinese Taipei (TPE); Wu Chih-Chi; Lu Yun-Feng	Japan (JPN); Kenji Matsudaira; Yuri Yamanashi
Mixed Doubles	Chinese Taipei (TPE); Chiang Hung-Chieh; Huang Yi-Hua	Chinese Taipei (TPE); Wu Chih-Chi; Lu Yun-Feng	Spain (ESP); Jesus Cantero; Sara Ramirez

== Medal table ==
Rank	Nation	Gold	Silver	Bronze	Total
1	China (CHN)	5	1	0	6
2	Chinese Taipei (TPE)	2	1	1	4
3	Japan (JPN)	0	2	6	8
4	France (FRA)	0	2	2	4
5	Russia (RUS)	0	1	0	1
6	Germany (GER)	0	0	1	1
6	Serbia (SRB)	0	0	1	1
6	South Korea (KOR)	0	0	1	1
6	Spain (ESP)	0	0	1	1
6	Ukraine (UKR)	0	0	1	1
Totals (10 entries)		7	7	14	28
