= 2018 Korea Open (table tennis) =

Tournament details
- Dates: 19–22 July 2018
- Competitors: 32S / 16D
- Total prize money: US$266,000
- Venue: Chungmu Sports Arena
- Location: Daejeon, South Korea

Champions
- Men's singles: (South Korea) Jang Woo-jin
- Women's singles: (China) Zhu Yuling
- Men's doubles: (South Korea) Jang Woo-jin (South Korea) Lim Jong-hoon
- Women's doubles: (China) Chen Meng (China) Ding Ning
- Mixed doubles: (South Korea) Jang Woo-jin (North Korea) Cha Hyo Sim

The 2018 Korea Open was the seventh event of the 2018 ITTF World Tour. The event was organised by the Korea Table Tennis Association, under the authority of the International Table Tennis Federation (ITTF). It was the fourth of six top-tier Platinum events on the tour, and took place from 19 to 22 July in Daejeon, South Korea.

South Korea's Jang Woo-jin won the men's singles, men's doubles and mixed doubles titles, becoming the first player in the history of the ITTF World Tour to win three titles at the same event.

== Men's singles ==
=== Seeds ===
1. (Germany) Dimitrij Ovtcharov (second round)
2. (China) Lin Gaoyuan (semifinals)
3. (China) Xu Xin (second round)
4. (Hong Kong) Wong Chun Ting (first round)
5. (South Korea) Lee Sang-su (quarterfinals)
6. (Japan) Koki Niwa (first round)
7. (Japan) Tomokazu Harimoto (second round)
8. (Brazil) Hugo Calderano (quarterfinals)
9. (France) Simon Gauzy (first round)
10. (Japan) Jun Mizutani (semifinals)
11. (Japan) Kenta Matsudaira (first round)
12. (Chinese Taipei) Chuang Chih-yuan (second round)
13. (Nigeria) Quadri Aruna (first round)
14. (Japan) Jin Ueda (first round)
15. (South Korea) Lim Jong-hoon (quarterfinals)
16. (Germany) Patrick Franziska (first round)

=== Draw ===
==== Top half ====
First round
1	(Germany) Dimitrij Ovtcharov	11	11	11	11
(France) Enzo Angles	5	8	9	8
(Singapore) Gao Ning	6	4	4	3
10	(Japan) Jun Mizutani	11	11	11	11
11	(Japan) Kenta Matsudaira	14	5	8	4	7
(North Korea) Ham Yu Song	12	11	11	11	11
(Portugal) Tiago Apolónia	8	7	3	8
5	(South Korea) Lee Sang-su	11	11	11	11
6	(Japan) Koki Niwa	12	5	12	8	10	7
(South Korea) Jeong Sang-eun	10	11	10	11	12	11
(Japan) Yuya Oshima	13	6	11	9	11	6	14
14	(Japan) Jin Ueda	11	11	9	11	7	11	12
16	(Germany) Patrick Franziska	6	10	10	9
(South Korea) Jang Woo-jin	11	12	12	11
(Japan) Masataka Morizono	10	10	3	10
3	(China) Xu Xin	12	12	11	12

Second round
1	(Germany) Dimitrij Ovtcharov	6	11	8	3	11	4
10	(Japan) Jun Mizutani	11	2	11	11	5	11
(North Korea) Ham Yu Song	5	8	8	11	11	7
5	(South Korea) Lee Sang-su	11	11	11	5	6	11
(South Korea) Jeong Sang-eun	11	11	13	11
(Japan) Yuya Oshima	8	9	11	3
(South Korea) Jang Woo-jin	11	11	5	13	11
3	(China) Xu Xin	8	8	11	11	7

Quarterfinals
10	(Japan) Jun Mizutani	8	11	11	10	11	11
5	(South Korea) Lee Sang-su	11	6	4	12	8	8
(South Korea) Jeong Sang-eun	6	11	12	11	8	7	4
(South Korea) Jang Woo-jin	11	7	10	7	11	11	11

Semifinals
10	(Japan) Jun Mizutani	5	9	11	10	10
(South Korea) Jang Woo-jin	11	11	9	12	12

==== Bottom half ====
First round
4	(Hong Kong) Wong Chun Ting	4	9	11	11	15	9	9
(North Korea) An Ji Song	11	11	6	4	13	11	11
(India) Sathiyan Gnanasekaran	11	4	11	7	8	8
15	(South Korea) Lim Jong-hoon	9	11	5	11	11	11
13	(Nigeria) Quadri Aruna	11	5	15	6	7
(China) Liang Jingkun	9	11	17	11	11
(South Korea) Jung Young-sik	11	10	7	11	8	9
7	(Japan) Tomokazu Harimoto	8	12	11	6	11	11
8	(Brazil) Hugo Calderano	12	11	11	11
(Chinese Taipei) Chen Chien-an	10	9	6	7
(South Korea) Cho Seung-min	11	5	12	9	12	11
9	(France) Simon Gauzy	4	11	10	11	10	5
12	(Chinese Taipei) Chuang Chih-yuan	3	11	9	6	11	12	12
(France) Can Akkuzu	11	6	11	11	5	10	10
(South Korea) Kim Min-hyeok	6	3	5	6
2	(China) Lin Gaoyuan	11	11	11	11

Second round
(North Korea) An Ji Song	10	1	5	8
15	(South Korea) Lim Jong-hoon	12	11	11	11
(China) Liang Jingkun	11	11	11	11
7	(Japan) Tomokazu Harimoto	9	4	4	8
8	(Brazil) Hugo Calderano	11	13	11	11
(South Korea) Cho Seung-min	7	11	9	6
12	(Chinese Taipei) Chuang Chih-yuan	11	13	4	8	9
2	(China) Lin Gaoyuan	4	15	11	11	11

Quarterfinals
15	(South Korea) Lim Jong-hoon	10	2	2	5
(China) Liang Jingkun	12	11	11	11
8	(Brazil) Hugo Calderano	7	11	6	11	1	8
2	(China) Lin Gaoyuan	11	9	11	6	11	11

Semifinals
(China) Liang Jingkun	11	6	11	5	11	11
2	(China) Lin Gaoyuan	9	11	7	11	6	9

==== Finals ====
Semifinals								Final
10	(Japan) Jun Mizutani	5	9	11	10	10
	(South Korea) Jang Woo-jin	11	11	9	12	12		(South Korea) Jang Woo-jin	11	11	11	11
	(China) Liang Jingkun	11	6	11	5	11	11	(China) Liang Jingkun	8	9	7	3
2	(China) Lin Gaoyuan	9	11	7	11	6	9

== Women's singles ==
=== Seeds ===
1. (China) Chen Meng (final)
2. (China) Zhu Yuling (champion)
3. (China) Wang Manyu (quarterfinals)
4. (Japan) Kasumi Ishikawa (semifinals)
5. (China) Liu Shiwen (semifinals)
6. (Japan) Mima Ito (quarterfinals)
7. (Japan) Miu Hirano (first round)
8. (Chinese Taipei) Cheng I-ching (quarterfinals)
9. (Singapore) Feng Tianwei (first round)
10. (China) Chen Xingtong (first round)
11. (China) Sun Yingsha (second round)
12. (China) Ding Ning (second round)
13. (Hong Kong) Doo Hoi Kem (first round)
14. (Japan) Hitomi Sato (first round)
15. (South Korea) Seo Hyo-won (quarterfinals)
16. (South Korea) Jeon Ji-hee (second round)

=== Draw ===
==== Top half ====
First round
1	(China) Chen Meng	11	11	11	11
(China) Li Jiayi	6	5	2	3
(Portugal) Fu Yu	3	4	8	11	9
12	(China) Ding Ning	11	11	11	9	11
16	(South Korea) Jeon Ji-hee	6	14	11	11	11
(Japan) Minami Ando	11	12	9	5	2
(Japan) Miyu Nagasaki	5	4	11	3	9
8	(Chinese Taipei) Cheng I-ching	11	11	4	11	11
5	(China) Liu Shiwen	11	11	11	11
(Netherlands) Li Jie	8	4	5	7
(Japan) Honoka Hashimoto	2	11	11	15	11
10	(China) Chen Xingtong	11	8	9	13	6
14	(Japan) Hitomi Sato	10	8	9	11	6
(South Korea) Choi Hyo-joo	12	11	11	7	11
(Hong Kong) Ng Wing Nam	11	8	2	10	9
3	(China) Wang Manyu	3	11	11	12	11

Second round
1	(China) Chen Meng	11	7	11	11	11
12	(China) Ding Ning	7	11	3	5	9
16	(South Korea) Jeon Ji-hee	11	12	8	8	10
8	(Chinese Taipei) Cheng I-ching	8	14	11	11	12
5	(China) Liu Shiwen	14	11	11	11
(Japan) Honoka Hashimoto	12	5	6	6
(South Korea) Choi Hyo-joo	13	4	13	13	7	5
3	(China) Wang Manyu	11	11	11	15	11	11

Quarterfinals
1	(China) Chen Meng	11	6	11	11	11
8	(Chinese Taipei) Cheng I-ching	7	11	7	4	6
5	(China) Liu Shiwen	3	11	11	11	6	11
3	(China) Wang Manyu	11	4	6	6	11	9

Semifinals
1	(China) Chen Meng	9	5	11	11	11	12
5	(China) Liu Shiwen	11	11	9	9	8	10

==== Bottom half ====
First round
4	(Japan) Kasumi Ishikawa	11	11	11	11
(South Korea) Lee Na-kyung	5	7	5	4
(North Korea) Kim Song-i	8	5	7	11	5
11	(China) Sun Yingsha	11	11	11	5	11
13	(Hong Kong) Doo Hoi Kem	5	7	3	4
(China) Hu Limei	11	11	11	11
(China) Gu Yuting	6	11	10	11	10
6	(Japan) Mima Ito	11	13	12	8	12
7	(Japan) Miu Hirano	11	11	11	7	1	13
(Japan) Saki Shibata	13	7	7	11	11	15
(North Korea) Kim Sol-song	5	12	8	12	7	10
15	(South Korea) Seo Hyo-won	11	10	11	10	11	12
9	(Singapore) Feng Tianwei	6	13	7	11	6	8
(Japan) Miyu Kato	11	11	11	9	11	11
(Hong Kong) Li Ching Wan	8	6	12	5
2	(China) Zhu Yuling	11	11	14	11

Second round
4	(Japan) Kasumi Ishikawa	9	11	13	11	11
11	(China) Sun Yingsha	11	9	11	8	2
(China) Hu Limei	11	6	6	9	7
6	(Japan) Mima Ito	4	11	11	11	11
(Japan) Saki Shibata	11	11	7	11	9	6	10
15	(South Korea) Seo Hyo-won	9	5	11	4	11	11	12
(Japan) Miyu Kato	7	11	6	4	9
2	(China) Zhu Yuling	11	7	11	11	11

Quarterfinals
4	(Japan) Kasumi Ishikawa	11	11	11	13
6	(Japan) Mima Ito	8	5	6	11
15	(South Korea) Seo Hyo-won	6	7	4	4
2	(China) Zhu Yuling	11	11	11	11

Semifinals
4	(Japan) Kasumi Ishikawa	8	6	8	9
2	(China) Zhu Yuling	11	11	11	11

==== Finals ====
Semifinals								Final
1	(China) Chen Meng	9	5	11	11	11	12
5	(China) Liu Shiwen	11	11	9	9	8	10	1	(China) Chen Meng	4	11	8	5	9
4	(Japan) Kasumi Ishikawa	8	6	8	9			2	(China) Zhu Yuling	11	7	11	11	11
2	(China) Zhu Yuling	11	11	11	11

== Men's doubles ==
=== Seeds ===
1. (Hong Kong) Ho Kwan Kit / Wong Chun Ting (final)
2. (Japan) Masataka Morizono / Yuya Oshima (first round)
3. (Japan) Koki Niwa / Jin Ueda (quarterfinals)
4. (Germany) Patrick Franziska / Ricardo Walther (first round)
5. (South Korea) Lee Sang-su / (North Korea) Pak Sin-hyok (semifinals)
6. (South Korea) Jang Woo-jin / Lim Jong-hoon (champions)
7. (Chinese Taipei) Chen Chien-an / Chuang Chih-yuan (quarterfinals)
8. (Hong Kong) Lam Siu Hang / Ng Pak Nam (quarterfinals)

=== Draw ===
First round
1	(Hong Kong) Ho / Wong	10	11	11	11
(Singapore) Gao / Poh	12	8	7	5
(Belgium) Nuytinck / (France) Robinot	7	8	8
7	(Chinese Taipei) Chen / Chuang	11	11	11
5	(South Korea) Lee / (North Korea) Pak	11	11	11
(Germany) Baum / (Slovakia) Keinath	4	5	4
(China) Liang / Yan	11	11	7	12
4	(Germany) Franziska / Walther	5	8	11	10
3	(Japan) Niwa / Ueda	11	11	9	12
(Poland) Dyjas / (Spain) Robles	6	7	11	10
(Chinese Taipei) Liao / Lin	5	12	11	6	9
6	(South Korea) Jang / Lim	11	10	9	11	11
8	(Hong Kong) Lam / Ng	13	11	8	11
(South Korea) Cho / Kim	11	9	11	9
(China) Wang / Xue	11	11	5	11
2	(Japan) Morizono / Oshima	3	7	11	5

Quarterfinals
1	(Hong Kong) Ho / Wong	3	11	11	11	11
7	(Chinese Taipei) Chen / Chuang	11	13	9	7	9
5	(South Korea) Lee / (North Korea) Pak	11	13	3	4	11
(China) Liang / Yan	9	11	11	11	7
3	(Japan) Niwa / Ueda	10	11	8	4
6	(South Korea) Jang / Lim	12	5	11	11
8	(Hong Kong) Lam / Ng	9	9	6
(China) Wang / Xue	11	11	11

Semifinals
1	(Hong Kong) Ho / Wong	11	11	11
5	(South Korea) Lee / (North Korea) Pak	9	9	8
6	(South Korea) Jang / Lim	10	11	11	18
(China) Wang / Xue	12	5	6	16

Final
1	(Hong Kong) Ho / Wong	8	17	11	9
6	(South Korea) Jang / Lim	11	19	9	11

== Women's doubles ==
=== Seeds ===
1. (Japan) Hina Hayata / Mima Ito (first round)
2. (South Korea) Jeon Ji-hee / Yang Ha-eun (semifinals)
3. (China) Wang Manyu / Zhu Yuling (final)
4. (China) Chen Meng / Ding Ning (champions)
5. (Hong Kong) Ng Wing Nam / Soo Wai Yam Minnie (quarterfinals)
6. (India) Manika Batra / Mouma Das (first round)
7. (Japan) Miu Hirano / Kasumi Ishikawa (quarterfinals)
8. (Singapore) Yu Mengyu / Zhou Yihan (quarterfinals)

=== Draw ===
First round
1	(Japan) Hayata / Ito
(North Korea) Cha / Kim	w/o
(India) Patkar / Sahasrabudhe	4	7	2
7	(Japan) Hirano / Ishikawa	11	11	11
6	(India) Batra / Das	7	11	8	8
(Slovakia) Balážová / (Spain) Dvorak	11	9	11	11
(North Korea) Kim / (South Korea) Seo	12	5	11	10	9
3	(China) Wang / Zhu	10	11	3	12	11
4	(China) Chen / Ding	11	11	11
(Chinese Taipei) Cheng / Liu	3	8	9
(Chinese Taipei) Liu / Su	3	5	7
8	(Singapore) Yu / Zhou	11	11	11
5	(Hong Kong) Ng / Soo	11	11	6	9	11
(South Korea) Ryu / Shin	9	5	11	11	8
(Singapore) Lin / Zeng	9	8	11	8
2	(South Korea) Jeon / Yang	11	11	5	11

Quarterfinals
(North Korea) Cha / Kim	11	4	11	11
7	(Japan) Hirano / Ishikawa	7	11	8	2
(Slovakia) Balážová / (Spain) Dvorak	7	6	6
3	(China) Wang / Zhu	11	11	11
4	(China) Chen / Ding	11	11	11
8	(Singapore) Yu / Zhou	4	7	3
5	(Hong Kong) Ng / Soo	4	10	10
2	(South Korea) Jeon / Yang	11	12	12

Semifinals
(North Korea) Cha / Kim	9	13	7
3	(China) Wang / Zhu	11	15	11
4	(China) Chen / Ding	9	9	12	11	11
2	(South Korea) Jeon / Yang	11	11	10	5	9

Final
3	(China) Wang / Zhu	12	11	9	11
4	(China) Chen / Ding	14	9	11	13

== Mixed doubles ==
=== Seeds ===
1. (Japan) Masataka Morizono / Mima Ito (first round)
2. (Hong Kong) Wong Chun Ting / Doo Hoi Kem (first round)
3. (South Korea) Lee Sang-su / Jeon Ji-hee (quarterfinals)
4. (Chinese Taipei) Chen Chien-an / Cheng I-ching (semifinals)
5. (Hong Kong) Ho Kwan Kit / Lee Ho Ching (quarterfinals)
6. (China) Lin Gaoyuan / Wang Manyu (quarterfinals)
7. (Japan) Tomokazu Harimoto / Hina Hayata (first round)
8. (South Korea) Lim Jong-hoon / Yang Ha-eun (semifinals)

=== Draw ===
First round
1	(Japan) Morizono / Ito	5	11	5	11	12
(North Korea) Pak / Kim	11	8	11	7	14
(China) Wang / Sun	w/o
7	(Japan) Harimoto / Hayata
8	(South Korea) Lim / Yang	10	11	11	14
(India) Gnanasekaran / Batra	12	7	2	12
(North Korea) Choe / (South Korea) Yoo	5	11	7	11
3	(South Korea) Lee / Jeon	11	9	11	13
4	(Chinese Taipei) Chen / Cheng	11	11	14
(Chinese Taipei) Chuang / Chen	6	5	12
(Slovakia) Pištej / Balážová	11	2	11	2	4
6	(China) Lin / Wang	3	11	5	11	11
5	(Hong Kong) Ho / Lee	11	11	11
(Singapore) Gao / Yu	4	8	5
(South Korea) Jang / (North Korea) Cha	8	11	11	11
2	(Hong Kong) Wong / Doo	11	8	9	8

Quarterfinals
(North Korea) Pak / Kim	19	11	11	13	7
(China) Wang / Sun	21	6	9	15	11
8	(South Korea) Lim / Yang	11	11	11
3	(South Korea) Lee / Jeon	4	6	5
4	(Chinese Taipei) Chen / Cheng	7	11	14	8	12
6	(China) Lin / Wang	11	8	12	11	10
5	(Hong Kong) Ho / Lee	11	4	8
(South Korea) Jang / (North Korea) Cha	13	11	11

Semifinals
(China) Wang / Sun	11	12	11	11
8	(South Korea) Lim / Yang	9	14	9	6
4	(Chinese Taipei) Chen / Cheng	11	5	16	6	4
(South Korea) Jang / (North Korea) Cha	6	11	14	11	11

Final
(China) Wang / Sun	11	3	4	8
(South Korea) Jang / (North Korea) Cha	5	11	11	11
