= Table tennis at the 2001 Summer Universiade =

Competition in Beijing, China

The Table tennis competition in the 2001 Summer Universiade were held in Beijing, People's Republic of China.

== Medal overview ==
Event	Gold	Silver	Bronze
Men's Singles	Wang Liqin (CHN)	Chuan Chin-yuan (TPE)	Yong Zhang (CHN)
Men's Singles	Wang Liqin (CHN)	Chuan Chin-yuan (TPE)	Liu Guozheng (CHN)
Men's Doubles	China (CHN); Liu Guozheng; Young Zang	South Korea (KOR); Joo Se-Hyuk; Park Sang-Joon	Chinese Taipei (TPE); Chiang Peng-lung; Chang Yen-shu
Men's Doubles	China (CHN); Liu Guozheng; Young Zang	South Korea (KOR); Joo Se-Hyuk; Park Sang-Joon	Japan (JPN); Koji Sansa; Shinnosuke Kiho
Men's Team	China (CHN)	Chinese Taipei (TPE)	South Korea (KOR)
Men's Team	China (CHN)	Chinese Taipei (TPE)	Egypt (EGY)
Women's Singles	Yana Tie (CHN)	Niu Jianfeng (CHN)	Yining Zhang (CHN)
Women's Singles	Yana Tie (CHN)	Niu Jianfeng (CHN)	Ryu Ji-Hye (KOR)
Women's Doubles	China (CHN) Niu Jianfeng; Yining Zhang	South Korea (KOR) Ryu Ji-Hye; Kim Moo-Kyo	North Korea (PRK); Ko Un-Gyong; Ryom Won-Ok
Women's Doubles	China (CHN) Niu Jianfeng; Yining Zhang	South Korea (KOR) Ryu Ji-Hye; Kim Moo-Kyo	Belarus (BLR); Veronika Pavlovich; Viktoria Pavlovich
Women's Team	China (CHN)	South Korea (KOR)	Japan (JPN)
Women's Team	China (CHN)	South Korea (KOR)	North Korea (PRK)
Mixed Doubles	China (CHN); Liqin Wang; Yana Tie	South Korea (KOR); Ryu Ji-Hye; Park Sang-Joon	China (CHN); Liu Guozheng; Niu Jianfeng
Mixed Doubles	China (CHN); Liqin Wang; Yana Tie	South Korea (KOR); Ryu Ji-Hye; Park Sang-Joon	Chinese Taipei (TPE); Chen Chi-tan; Chiang Peng-lung

== Medal table ==
Rank	Nation	Gold	Silver	Bronze	Total
1	China (CHN)	7	1	4	12
2	South Korea (KOR)	0	4	2	6
3	Chinese Taipei (TPE)	0	2	2	4
4	Japan (JPN)	0	0	2	2
4	North Korea (PRK)	0	0	2	2
6	Belarus (BLR)	0	0	1	1
6	Egypt (EGY)	0	0	1	1
Totals (7 entries)		7	7	14	28
