= Korea Open (table tennis) =

Tournament information
- Event name: Korea Open
- Tour: ITTF World Tour
- Founded: 1985
- Location: Daejeon (2018)
- Venue: Chungmu Sports Arena (2018)
- Category: World Tour Platinum
- Draw: 32S / 16D
- Prize money: US$266,000 (2018)

Current champions (2018)
- Men's singles: (South Korea) Jang Woo-jin
- Women's singles: (China) Zhu Yuling
- Men's doubles: (South Korea) Jang Woo-jin (South Korea) Lim Jong-hoon
- Women's doubles: (China) Chen Meng (China) Ding Ning

The Korea Open is an annual table tennis tournament in South Korea. It is organised by the Korea Table Tennis Association, under the authority of the International Table Tennis Federation (ITTF), and is currently one of six top-tier Platinum events on the ITTF World Tour.

== History ==
The tournament was first held in 1980, and has featured on the ITTF World Tour's schedule (former ITTF Pro Tour) every year since 2001.

China's Xu Xin currently holds the record for most men's singles tournament wins, with four, while Singapore's Feng Tianwei holds the record for most women's singles tournament wins, also with three.

== Champions ==
=== 1980–2017 ===
Year	Men's singles	Women's singles	Men's doubles	Women's doubles
1980*	(France) Jacques Secretin	(South Korea) Hwang Nam Suk	(France) Jacques Secretin (France) Patrick Gernot	(South Korea) Lee Su Ja (South Korea) Kim Jung Ja
1982*	(Sweden) Jan-Ove Waldner	(South Korea) Yang Young-Ja	(Japan) Masahiro Maehara (Japan) Kiyoshi Saito	(South Korea) An Hae-Sook (South Korea) Yang Young-Ja
1985**	(China) Wang Huiyuan	(China) Geng Lijuan		
1993	(China) Wang Tao	(China) Deng Yaping	(South Korea) Chu Kyo-sung (South Korea) Kang Hee-Chan	(China) Deng Yaping (China) Gao Jun
1994	(China) Kong Linghui	(Hong Kong) Chai Po Wa	(South Korea) Chu Kyo-sung (South Korea) Lee Chul-seung	(China) Qiao Hong (China) Qiao Yunping
2001	(South Korea) Kim Taek-soo	(China) Wang Nan	(China) Kong Linghui (China) Liu Guoliang	(China) Gao Xi (China) Li Jia
2002	(Austria) Werner Schlager	(Hong Kong) Tie Ya Na	(South Korea) Kim Taek-soo (South Korea) Oh Sang-eun	(China) Bai Yang (China) Guo Yan
2003	(China) Ma Lin	(China) Guo Yan	(China) Chen Qi (China) Ma Lin	(China) Guo Yue (China) Niu Jianfeng
2004	(China) Wang Liqin	(China) Zhang Yining	(China) Kong Linghui (China) Wang Hao	(China) Wang Nan (China) Zhang Yining
2005	(South Korea) Oh Sang-eun	(South Korea) Kim Kyung-ah	(South Korea) Lee Jung-woo (South Korea) Ryu Seung-min	(Singapore) Tan Paey Fern (Singapore) Zhang Xueling
2006	(South Korea) Joo Sae-hyuk	(Hong Kong) Tie Ya Na	(Hong Kong) Cheung Yuk (Hong Kong) Leung Chu Yan	(Hong Kong) Tie Ya Na (Hong Kong) Zhang Rui
2007	(South Korea) Oh Sang-eun	(Hong Kong) Jiang Huajun	(South Korea) Lee Jung-woo (South Korea) Ryu Seung-min	(United States) Gao Jun (Spain) Shen Yanfei
2008	(China) Ma Long	(China) Guo Yue	(China) Wang Hao (China) Wang Liqin	(China) Guo Yue (China) Liu Shiwen
2009	(Japan) Jun Mizutani	(Singapore) Feng Tianwei	(China) Hao Shuai (China) Wang Hao	(South Korea) Kim Kyung-ah (South Korea) Park Mi-young
2010	(Belarus) Vladimir Samsonov	(Spain) Shen Yanfei	(Germany) Patrick Baum (Germany) Bastian Steger	(South Korea) Kim Kyung-ah (South Korea) Park Mi-young
2011	(Germany) Dimitrij Ovtcharov	(Singapore) Feng Tianwei	(China) Jin Yixiong (China) Song Hongyuan	(Japan) Hiroko Fujii (Japan) Misako Wakamiya
2012	(China) Zhang Jike	(China) Liu Shiwen	(China) Ma Long (China) Xu Xin	(China) Ding Ning (China) Liu Shiwen
2013	(China) Xu Xin	(South Korea) Suh Hyo-won	(South Korea) Suh Hyun-deok (China) Zhang Jike	(South Korea) Park Young-sook (South Korea) Yang Ha-eun
2014	(China) Xu Xin	(Germany) Han Ying	(China) Yu Ziyang (China) Zhou Kai	(China) Chen Ke (China) Wang Manyu
2015	(South Korea) Jung Young-sik	(Japan) Ai Fukuhara	(South Korea) Jung Young-sik (South Korea) Kim Min-seok	(Japan) Miu Hirano (Japan) Mima Ito
2016	(China) Xu Xin	(China) Ding Ning	(China) Xu Xin (China) Zhang Jike	(China) Ding Ning (China) Liu Shiwen
2017	(Germany) Timo Boll	(Singapore) Feng Tianwei	(South Korea) Jang Woo-jin (South Korea) Jeong Sang-eun	(Germany) Shan Xiaona (Germany) Petrissa Solja

- ) was called Seoul Open
  - ) was the final tournament of the Grand Prix series, called Seoul Grand Prix

=== 2018–present ===
Year	Men's singles	Women's singles	Men's doubles	Women's doubles	Mixed doubles
2018	(South Korea) Jang Woo-jin	(China) Zhu Yuling	(South Korea) Jang Woo-jin (South Korea) Lim Jong-hoon	(China) Chen Meng (China) Ding Ning	(South Korea) Jang Woo-jin (North Korea) Cha Hyo Sim
2019	(China) Xu Xin	(China) Chen Meng	(China) Fan Zhendong (China) Xu Xin	(China) Chen Meng (China) Wang Manyu	(Hong Kong) Wong Chun Ting (Hong Kong) Doo Hoi Kem

== See also ==
- Asian Table Tennis Union
