= Nigeria Open (table tennis) =

Tournament information
- Tour: ITTF Challenge Series
- Sponsor: Baba Ijebu; Government of Lagos State
- Founded: 2013
- Location: Lagos
- Venue: Teslim Balogun Stadium
- Category: ITTF World Tour
- Prize money: US$46,000 (2018)

Current champions (2018 ITTF Challenge Series Nigeria Open)
- Men's singles: (Nigeria) Quadri Aruna
- Women's singles: (China) Guo Yan
- Men's doubles: (France) Alexandre Robinot (France) Joe Seyfried
- Women's doubles: (China) Qi Fenjie (China) Sun Chen

The Nigeria Open, also called ITTF Challenge Nigeria Series or ITTF Challenge Seamester Nigeria Open is an annual table tennis tournament in Lagos, Nigeria, run by the International Table Tennis Federation as part of Challenge Series. Egyptian Omar Assar has won the most single gold medals. In 2018, the prize money for the medalist at the event was $46,000. The maiden edition was known as Lagos Classics, it was until 2014 that the tournament was listed in ITTF calendar.

== Tournament winners ==
=== Individual events ===
Year	Men's singles	runner-up	Women's singles	runner-up	Ref
2013	(Egypt) Omar Assar	(Nigeria) Segun Toriola	(Nigeria) Cecilia Otu Akpan	(Nigeria) Offiong Edem	
2014	(Egypt) Omar Assar		(Egypt) Nadeen El-Dawlatly	(Egypt) Dina Meshref	
2015	(Egypt) Omar Assar	(Nigeria) Quadri Aruna	(Portugal) Shao Jieni	(Egypt) Dina Meshref	
2016	(Finland) Benedek Olah	(Egypt) Khalid Assar	(Portugal) Shao Jieni	(Hungary) Szandra Pergel	
2017	(Egypt) Omar Assar	(India) Sarthak Ghandi	(Egypt) Dina Meshref	(Russia) Kulikova Olga	
2018	(Nigeria) Quadri Aruna	(France) Antoine Hachard	(China) Guo Yan	(China) Sun Chen	
