= Yuko Fujii =

Japanese table tennis player

Personal information
- Nationality: Japanese
- Born: 6 May 1990 (age 34)

Sport
- Sport: Table tennis

Yuko Fujii (born 6 May 1990) is a Japanese table tennis player. Her highest career ITTF ranking was 94.
