= ITTF Challenge Series =

Annual table tennis tournament series

- Sport: Table tennis
- Founded: 2013
- Folded: 2020
- Replaced by: World Table Tennis Feeder Series
- Owner: International Table Tennis Federation
- Related competitions: ITTF World Tour
- Website: ittfchallengeseries.com

The ITTF Challenge Series was an annual series of table tennis tournaments organised by the International Table Tennis Federation (ITTF). Initially created in 2013 as the third tier of the ITTF World Tour (below the Super Series and Major Series), the Challenge Series became a separate tour in 2017. It was the ITTF's secondary tour, below the World Tour.

Starting from 2019, the series had two tiers: ITTF Challenge Plus and ITTF Challenge. Canada, Nigeria, North Korea, Oman, Paraguay, and Portugal were announced as host for the Challenge Plus tournaments for the 2019 season.

Since 2021, the ITTF Challenge Series has been effectively replaced by the newly created World Table Tennis Feeder Series.

== Tournaments ==
The following tournaments have featured as part of the ITTF Challenge Series since it separated from the ITTF World Tour in 2017.

Tournament	2017	2018	2019	Total
Belarus Open	•	•	•	3
Belgium Open	•	•		2
Brazil Open	•			1
Canada Open			•	1
Chile Open	•			1
Croatia Open	•	•	•	3
(North Korea) DPR Korea Open	•	•	•	3
Indonesia Open			•	1
(Mexico) Mexican Open			•	1
(Morocco) Moroccan Open			•	1
(Nigeria) Nigerian Open	•	•	•	3
Oman Open			•	1
(Paraguay) Paraguayan Open			•	1
(Poland) Polish Open	•	•	•	3
Portugal Open			•	1
(Serbia) Serbian Open			•	1
Slovenia Open	•	•	•	3
(Spain) Spanish Open	•	•	•	3
Thailand Open	•	•	•	3
(Turkey) Turkish Open			•	1

● ITTF Challenge Plus

== See also ==
- ITTF World Tour
