= ITTF World Tour =

Annual series of table tennis tournaments

- Sport: Table tennis
- Founded: 1996
- Folded: 2020
- Replaced by: World Table Tennis
- Owner: International Table Tennis Federation
- Sponsor: Seamaster
- Related competitions: ITTF World Tour Grand Finals; ITTF Challenge Series

The ITTF World Tour, known as the ITTF Pro Tour until 2011, was an annual series of table tennis tournaments introduced by International Table Tennis Federation (ITTF) in 1996. The tour includes events in seven categories: Men's and Women's Singles, Men's, Women's, and Mixed Doubles, and Under-21 Men's and Women's Singles. The tour has its own points system, with players accumulating points based on their performances in the tournaments they enter.

== History ==
Since 2017, the ITTF also announced that the World Tour would be split into two tiers, with six World Tour Platinum, the new top tier of World Tour, and six regular World Tour events. The players who gain the most points in each of the seven different categories will be invited to participate in the ITTF World Tour Grand Finals at the end of the year.

Since 2021, the ITTF World Tour has been effectively replaced by the newly created World Table Tennis.

== Overview ==
Tournaments		−'15	2013−'16	2017−
Tiers	0	ITTF Pro Tour Grand Finals/ITTF World Tour Grand Finals		
Tiers	I		Super Series	World Tour Platinum
Tiers	II		Major Series	World Tour
Tiers	III		Challenge Series	

=== ITTF Pro Tour (1996–2011) ===
Number of tournaments in each year (Grand Finals not counted):

Year	1996	1997	1998	1999	2000	2001	2002	2003	2004	2005	2006	2007	2008	2009	2010	2011
Number of tournaments	10	14	11	12	9	12	13	10	16	14	16	17	14	14	13	16
Location of Grand Finals	(China)	(Hong Kong)	(France)	(Australia)	(Japan)	(China)	(Sweden)	(China)	(China)	(China)	(Hong Kong)	(China)	(Macau)	(Macau)	(South Korea)	(England)

=== ITTF World Tour (2012–2019) ===
Number of tournaments in each year (Grand Finals not counted):

Year	2012	2013	2014	2015	2016	2017	2018	2019
Number of tournaments	21	19	20	22	20	12	12	12
Location of Grand Finals	(China)	(United Arab Emirates)	(Thailand)	(Portugal)	(Qatar)	(Kazakhstan)	(South Korea)	(China)

== Tournaments by year ==
This is a list of tournaments that have featured in the ITTF Pro Tour and ITTF World Tour since 1996, with "•" indicating the years in which each tournament featured.

From 2004 to 2009, and again from 2011 to 2013, there were two China Open tournaments in each calendar year.

Since 2017, the ITTF Challenge Series has been run as a separate tour, reducing the number of tournaments on the main ITTF World Tour.

Tournament	96	97	98	99	00	01	02	03	04	05	06	07	08	09	10	11	12	13	14	15	16	17	18	19	Total
Argentina Open																			•	•					2
(Australia) Australian Open	•	•	•	•															•	•	•	•	•	•	10
(Austria) Austrian Open		•		•			•		•			•	•		•	•		•		•	•	•	•	•	14
Belarus Open													•	•			•	•	•	•	•	Part of Challenge Series			7
Belgium Open																	•		•	•	•	Part of Challenge Series			4
Brazil Open	•	•		•	•	•	•	•	•	•	•	•	•			•	•	•	•			•			17
(Bulgaria) Bulgarian Open																				•	•	•	•	•	5
Chile Open									•	•	•	•	•			•	•		•	•	•				10
China Open	•	•	•	•	•	•	•	•	•	•	•	•	•	•	•	•	•	•	•	•	•	•	•	•	33
China Open	•	•	•	•	•	•	•	•	•	•	•	•	•	•	•	•	•	•	•	•	•	•	•	•	33
Chinese Taipei Open										•	•	•													3
Croatia Open			•	•	•	•		•	•	•	•	•					•	•	•	•	•	Part of Challenge Series			14
(Czech Republic) Czech Open				•													•	•	•	•	•	•	•	•	9
(Denmark) Danish Open					•	•	•	•	•					•											6
(North Korea) DPR Korea Open																				•	•	Part of Challenge Series			2
(Netherlands) Dutch Open						•	•																		2
Egypt Open							•		•						•		•	•							5
(England) English Open	•	•		•		•								•		•									6
(France) French Open	•	•		•	•							•													5
(Germany) German Open				•		•	•	•	•	•	•	•	•	•	•	•	•	•	•	•	•	•	•	•	20
(Greece) Greek Open									•																1
Hong Kong Open																							•	•	2
(Hungary) Hungarian Open															•		•		•	•	•	•	•	•	8
India Open												•		•	•							•			4
(Italy) Italian Open	•		•				•																		3
Japan Open	•	•	•	•	•	•	•	•	•	•	•	•	•	•	•	•	•	•	•	•	•	•	•	•	24
(South Korea) Korea Open						•	•	•	•	•	•	•	•	•	•	•	•	•	•	•	•	•	•	•	19
Kuwait Open											•	•	•	•	•		•	•	•	•	•				10
Lebanon Open		•	•																						2
Malaysia Open		•	•					•																	3
Morocco Open														•	•	•	•	•							5
Nigeria Open																			•	•	•	Part of Challenge Series			3
Philippines Open																			•	•					2
(Poland) Polish Open		•			•		•		•		•		•	•	•	•	•	•		•	•	Part of Challenge Series			13
Qatar Open		•	•	•		•	•	•		•	•	•	•	•	•	•	•	•	•	•	•	•	•	•	21
(Russia) Russian Open									•	•	•	•					•	•	•						7
(Serbia) Serbian Open											•														1
Singapore Open									•		•		•												3
Slovenia Open										•	•	•	•	•	•	•	•				•	Part of Challenge Series			9
(Spain) Spanish Open																•	•	•	•	•		Part of Challenge Series			5
(Sweden) Swedish Open	•	•	•	•	•	•		•		•		•				•	•	•	•	•	•	•	•	•	18
(United Arab Emirates) UAE Open																•		•							2
(United States) U.S. Open	•	•	•		•	•	•		•	•								•							9
(Federal Republic of Yugoslavia) Yugoslavia Open	•	•	•																						3
Tournament	96	97	98	99	00	01	02	03	04	05	06	07	08	09	10	11	12	13	14	15	16	17	18	19	Total

== Business ==
On 12 January 2017, it was announced that Chinese shipping company Seamaster had agreed a four-year sponsorship and strategic partnership deal with the ITTF World Tour.

== See also ==
- World Table Tennis Championships
- Table Tennis World Cup
- Table tennis at the Summer Olympics
