= 2013 World Table Tennis Championships – Men's doubles =

Men's doubles at the 2013 World Table Tennis Championships
- Venue: Palais Omnisports de Paris-Bercy
- Location: Paris, France
- Dates: 15–19 May
- Final score: 9–11, 12–10, 11–6, 13–11, 9–11, 11–8

Medalists
gold medal	Chen Chien-an; Chuang Chih-yuan	Chinese Taipei
silver medal	Hao Shuai; Ma Lin	China
bronze medal	Seiya Kishikawa; Jun Mizutani	Japan
bronze medal	Wang Liqin; Zhou Yu	China

The 2013 World Table Tennis Championships men's doubles was the 52nd edition of the men's doubles championship.

Chen Chien-an and Chuang Chih-yuan defeated Hao Shuai and Ma Lin 9–11, 12–10, 11–6, 13–11, 9–11, 11–8 in the final to win the title.

== Seeds ==
Doubles matches were best of 5 games in qualification matches and best of 7 games in the 64-player sized main draw.

1. (China) Hao Shuai / (China) Ma Lin (final)
2. (China) Wang Liqin / (China) Zhou Yu (semifinals)
3. (China) Chen Qi / (China) Fang Bo (third round)
4. (Singapore) Gao Ning / (Singapore) Yang Zi (second round)
5. (Japan) Kenta Matsudaira / (Japan) Koki Niwa (third round)
6. (South Korea) Kim Min-Seok / (South Korea) Seo Hyun-Deok (quarterfinals)
7. (Chinese Taipei) Chen Chien-an / (Chinese Taipei) Chuang Chih-yuan (champions)
8. (Hong Kong) Jiang Tianyi / (Hong Kong) Leung Chu Yan (third round)
9. (Japan) Seiya Kishikawa / (Japan) Jun Mizutani (semifinals)
10. (Japan) Kazuhiro Chan / (Japan) Kenji Matsudaira (quarterfinals)
11. (Austria) Robert Gardos / (Austria) Daniel Habesohn (quarterfinals)
12. (Russia) Alexander Shibaev / (Russia) Kirill Skachkov (second round)
13. (Germany) Patrick Baum / (Germany) Bastian Steger (third round)
14. (South Korea) Jung Young-Sik / (South Korea) Lee Sang-Su (third round)
15. (Sweden) Kristian Karlsson / (Sweden) Mattias Karlsson (third round)
16. (Russia) Alexey Liventsov / (Russia) Mikhail Paykov (third round)
17. (Portugal) Tiago Apolónia / (Portugal) João Monteiro (third round)
18. (Austria) Stefan Fegerl / (Austria) Feng Xiaoquan (first round)
19. (Brazil) Thiago Monteiro / (Brazil) Gustavo Tsuboi (second round)
20. (Sweden) Pär Gerell / (Sweden) Jens Lundqvist (second round)
21. (France) Adrien Mattenet / (France) Quentin Robinot (second round)
22. (France) Christophe Legoût / (France) Abdel-Kader Salifou (second round)
23. (Romania) Adrian Crişan / (Romania) Andrei Filimon (second round)
24. (Greece) Panagiotis Gionis / (Greece) Konstantinos Papageorgiou (first round)
25. (Chinese Taipei) Chiang Hung-chieh / (Chinese Taipei) Huang Sheng-sheng (quarterfinals)
26. (Poland) Robert Floras / (Poland) Daniel Gorak (first round)
27. (Italy) Mihai Bobocica / (Italy) Niagol Stoyanov (first round)
28. (Slovenia) Bojan Tokič / (Slovenia) Jan Zibrat (first round)
29. (Croatia) Andrej Gaćina / (Croatia) Tomislav Kolarek (second round)
30. (Spain) He Zhi Wen / (Spain) Carlos Machado (second round)
31. (France) Simon Gauzy / (France) Emmanuel Lebesson (second round)
32. (Hong Kong) Tang Peng / (Hong Kong) Wong Chun Ting (second round)

== Draw ==
=== Key ===
- Q = Qualifier
- w/o = Walkover
- w/d = Withdraw
- r = Retired
- DQ = Disqualified

=== Finals ===
Semifinals								Final
1	(China) Hao Shuai (China) Ma Lin	11	11	12	14
9	(Japan) Seiya Kishikawa (Japan) Jun Mizutani	7	9	10	12			1	(China) Hao Shuai (China) Ma Lin	11	10	6	11	11	8
7	(Chinese Taipei) Chen Chien-an (Chinese Taipei) Chuang Chih-yuan	11	11	9	9	11	11	7	(Chinese Taipei) Chen Chien-an (Chinese Taipei) Chuang Chih-yuan	9	12	11	13	9	11
2	(China) Wang Liqin (China) Zhou Yu	6	6	11	11	5	8

=== Top half ===
==== Section 1 ====
First Round
1	(China) S Hao (China) L Ma	11	11	11	11
(Czech Republic) L Jančárik (Czech Republic) D Prokopcov	1	4	4	8
(Croatia) Z Primorac (Croatia) R Tošić	6	11	11	8	11	5	11
18	(Austria) S Fegerl (Austria) X Feng	11	8	9	11	4	11	4
17	(Portugal) T Apolónia (Portugal) J Monteiro	8	11	18	11	11	14
(Hong Kong) Y Cheung (Hong Kong) KH Mak	11	5	20	9	8	12
(Romania) O Ionescu (Romania) H Szőcs	14	4	11	2	8
12	(Russia) A Shibaev (Russia) K Skachkov	16	11	7	11	11
11	(Austria) R Gardos (Austria) D Habesohn	9	11	11	16	6	11
(Belgium) R Devos (Belgium) C Nuytinck	11	7	4	14	11	7
(Belarus) K Barabanov (Belarus) P Platonov	7	8	9	5
22	(France) C Legoût (France) A-K Salifou	11	11	11	11
28	(Slovenia) B Tokič (Slovenia) J Zibrat	13	10	11	10	8	4
(North Korea) H-B Kim (North Korea) S-H Pak	11	12	6	12	11	11
(Hungary) D Kosiba (Hungary) T Lakatos	5	2	6	6
8	(Hong Kong) T Jiang (Hong Kong) CY Leung	11	11	11	11

Second Round
1	(China) S Hao (China) L Ma	11	11	11	11
(Croatia) Z Primorac (Croatia) R Tošić	4	3	9	3
17	(Portugal) T Apolónia (Portugal) J Monteiro	8	11	11	11	8	11
12	(Russia) A Shibaev (Russia) K Skachkov	11	8	3	8	11	3
11	(Austria) R Gardos (Austria) D Habesohn	11	11	5	11	9	11
22	(France) C Legoût (France) A-K Salifou	3	8	11	7	11	6
(North Korea) H-B Kim (North Korea) S-H Pak	6	5	9	11
8	(Hong Kong) T Jiang (Hong Kong) CY Leung	11	11	11	13

Third Round
1	(China) S Hao (China) L Ma	11	7	11	6	11	12
17	(Portugal) T Apolónia (Portugal) J Monteiro	3	11	7	11	2	10
11	(Austria) R Gardos (Austria) D Habesohn	8	11	11	11	4	12
8	(Hong Kong) T Jiang (Hong Kong) CY Leung	11	6	9	8	11	10

Quarterfinals
1	(China) S Hao (China) L Ma	11	12	8	11	11
11	(Austria) R Gardos (Austria) D Habesohn	6	10	11	5	8

==== Section 2 ====
First Round
5	(Japan) K Matsudaira (Japan) K Niwa	11	11	10	11	12	11
(Slovakia) L Pistej (Slovakia) P Sereda	9	8	12	13	10	6
(Egypt) E-s Lashin (Egypt) A Saleh	11	2	11	4	6	7
29	(Croatia) A Gaćina (Croatia) T Kolarek	6	11	4	11	11	11
23	(Romania) A Crişan (Romania) A Filimon	13	10	11	4	11	11
(South Korea) E-R Cho (South Korea) K-M Kim	11	12	5	11	9	7
(Poland) P Fertikowski (Poland) Z Wang	9	6	6	11	6
9	(Japan) S Kishikawa (Japan) J Mizutani	11	11	11	4	11
15	(Sweden) K Karlsson (Sweden) M Karlsson	9	11	13	11	11
(Spain) J Cantero (Spain) M Duran	11	6	11	5	4
(Chinese Taipei) C-s Lee (Chinese Taipei) C-c Wu	9	8	9	11	11	8
19	(Brazil) T Monteiro (Brazil) G Tsuboi	11	11	11	7	9	11
25	(Chinese Taipei) H-c Chiang (Chinese Taipei) S-s Huang	11	11	11	11
(Sweden) F Åkerstrom (Sweden) H Nordberg	6	7	7	7
(Lebanon) D Cheaib (Lebanon) A Moumjoghlian	7	7	4	8
4	(Singapore) N Gao (Singapore) Z Yang	11	11	11	11

Second Round
5	(Japan) K Matsudaira (Japan) K Niwa	11	11	11	11
29	(Croatia) A Gaćina (Croatia) T Kolarek	6	9	8	5
23	(Romania) A Crişan (Romania) A Filimon	9	5	4	3
9	(Japan) S Kishikawa (Japan) J Mizutani	11	11	11	11
15	(Sweden) K Karlsson (Sweden) M Karlsson	11	11	11	12
19	(Brazil) T Monteiro (Brazil) G Tsuboi	4	3	5	10
25	(Chinese Taipei) H-c Chiang (Chinese Taipei) S-s Huang	11	6	11	11	10	11
4	(Singapore) N Gao (Singapore) Z Yang	9	11	9	5	12	4

Third Round
5	(Japan) K Matsudaira (Japan) K Niwa	7	11	11	8	2	11	10
9	(Japan) S Kishikawa (Japan) J Mizutani	11	8	6	11	11	6	12
15	(Sweden) K Karlsson (Sweden) M Karlsson	10	11	7	3	3
25	(Chinese Taipei) H-c Chiang (Chinese Taipei) S-s Huang	12	9	11	11	11

Quarterfinals
9	(Japan) S Kishikawa (Japan) J Mizutani	6	11	11	5	11	11
25	(Chinese Taipei) H-c Chiang (Chinese Taipei) S-s Huang	11	8	4	11	8	8

=== Bottom half ===
==== Section 3 ====
First Round
3	(China) Q Chen (China) B Fang	11	11	11	11
(Denmark) M Hindersson (Denmark) M Rasmussen	6	8	5	7
(Denmark) J Groth (Denmark) K Sternberg	9	8	11	11	4	10
31	(France) S Gauzy (France) E Lebesson	11	11	7	7	11	12
21	(France) A Mattenet (France) Q Robinot	7	11	11	6	11	11	11
(Germany) P Franziska (Germany) S Mengel	11	7	13	11	6	6	8
(Indonesia) D Haruri (Indonesia) Y Mardiyono	6	3	8	3
10	(Japan) K Chan (Japan) K Matsudaira	11	11	11	11
13	(Germany) P Baum (Germany) B Steger	11	9	7	11	11	13
(Russia) V Burov (Russia) A Smirnov	6	11	11	8	5	11
(Iran) N Alamian (Iran) N Alamian	11	7	12	9	11	6
32	(Hong Kong) P Tang (Hong Kong) CT Wong	9	11	14	11	5	11
26	(Poland) R Floras (Poland) D Gorak	11	11	10	8	6
(Serbia) M Jevtović (Serbia) Ž Pete	13	8	12	11	11
(Luxembourg) M Bast (Luxembourg) G Michely	4	9	3	5
7	(Chinese Taipei) C-a Chen (Chinese Taipei) C-y Chuang	11	11	11	11

Second Round
3	(China) Q Chen (China) B Fang	11	10	11	11	11
31	(France) S Gauzy (France) E Lebesson	8	12	4	4	9
21	(France) A Mattenet (France) Q Robinot	6	9	11	8	11
10	(Japan) K Chan (Japan) K Matsudaira	11	11	9	11	13
13	(Germany) P Baum (Germany) B Steger	11	13	6	11	11
32	(Hong Kong) P Tang (Hong Kong) CT Wong	9	11	11	8	6
(Serbia) M Jevtović (Serbia) Ž Pete	6	7	10	4
7	(Chinese Taipei) C-a Chen (Chinese Taipei) C-y Chuang	11	11	12	11

Third Round
3	(China) Q Chen (China) B Fang	8	11	12	11	10	9	6
10	(Japan) K Chan (Japan) K Matsudaira	11	3	10	4	12	11	11
13	(Germany) P Baum (Germany) B Steger	11	8	11	8	13	9
7	(Chinese Taipei) C-a Chen (Chinese Taipei) C-y Chuang	9	11	7	11	15	11

Quarterfinals
10	(Japan) K Chan (Japan) K Matsudaira	13	12	10	5	11	11	9
7	(Chinese Taipei) C-a Chen (Chinese Taipei) C-y Chuang	11	10	12	11	9	13	11

==== Section 4 ====
First Round
6	(South Korea) M-S Kim (South Korea) H-D Seo	11	11	11	11
(Singapore) YCC Zhe (Singapore) XJ Pang	6	2	5	8
(United Arab Emirates) R Hassan (United Arab Emirates) R Omar	11	9	11	2	4	4
30	(Spain) ZW He (Spain) C Machado	8	11	7	11	11	11
24	(Greece) P Gionis (Greece) K Papageorgiou	8	11	4	3	11	9
(Brazil) H Calderano (Brazil) C Matsumoto	11	6	11	11	9	11
(Ukraine) L Kou (Ukraine) Y Zhmudenko	3	7	9	6
14	(South Korea) Y-S Jung (South Korea) S-S Lee	11	11	11	11
16	(Russia) A Liventsov (Russia) M Paykov	8	2	9	12	11	12	11
(Egypt) K Assar (Egypt) O Assar	11	11	11	10	6	10	9
(Czech Republic) P Sirucek (Czech Republic) T Tregler	11	11	11	10	11
27	(Italy) M Bobocica (Italy) N Stoyanov	7	8	5	12	2
20	(Sweden) P Gerell (Sweden) J Lundqvist	3	11	12	11	11	11
(Hungary) J Jakab (Hungary) D Zwickl	11	6	10	7	13	7
(England) A Baggaley (England) D Reed	6	5	8	4
2	(China) L Wang (China) Y Zhou	11	11	11	11

Second Round
6	(South Korea) M-S Kim (South Korea) H-D Seo	11	11	11	11
30	(Spain) ZW He (Spain) C Machado	7	4	5	3
(Brazil) H Calderano (Brazil) C Matsumoto	12	8	9	6
14	(South Korea) Y-S Jung (South Korea) S-S Lee	14	11	11	11
16	(Russia) A Liventsov (Russia) M Paykov	11	11	8	11	8	11
(Czech Republic) P Sirucek (Czech Republic) T Tregler	8	6	11	5	11	7
20	(Sweden) P Gerell (Sweden) J Lundqvist	11	5	8	7	2
2	(China) L Wang (China) Y Zhou	9	11	11	11	11

Third Round
6	(South Korea) M-S Kim (South Korea) H-D Seo	11	4	11	8	11	11
14	(South Korea) Y-S Jung (South Korea) S-S Lee	8	11	7	11	6	8
16	(Russia) A Liventsov (Russia) M Paykov	3	8	1	13
2	(China) L Wang (China) Y Zhou	11	11	11	15

Quarterfinals
6	(South Korea) M-S Kim (South Korea) H-D Seo	4	9	6	4
2	(China) L Wang (China) Y Zhou	11	11	11	11
