= Table tennis at the 2014 Asian Games – Men's doubles =

Men's doubles at the 2014 Asian Games
- Venue: Suwon Gymnasium
- Dates: 29 September – 3 October 2014
- Competitors: 72 from 20 nations

Medalists
gold medal	Ma Long; Zhang Jike	China
silver medal	Xu Xin; Fan Zhendong	China
bronze medal	Gao Ning; Li Hu	Singapore
bronze medal	Koki Niwa; Kenta Matsudaira	Japan

The men's doubles table tennis event was part of the table tennis programme and took place between September 29 and October 3, at the Suwon Gymnasium.

== Schedule ==
All times are Korea Standard Time (UTC+09:00)

Date	Time	Event
Monday, 29 September 2014	15:00	1st round
Tuesday, 30 September 2014	11:00	2nd round
Wednesday, 1 October 2014	17:00	3rd round
Thursday, 2 October 2014	14:00	Quarterfinals
Friday, 3 October 2014	10:00	Semifinals
Friday, 3 October 2014	18:00	Final

== Results ==
Legend

- WO — Won by walkover

=== Finals ===
Quarterfinals
1	Xu Xin (CHN); Fan Zhendong (CHN)	11	13	11
6	Tang Peng (HKG); Wong Chun Ting (HKG)	6	11	1
7	Gao Ning (SIN); Li Hu (SIN)	11	14	8	11
4	Jun Mizutani (JPN); Seiya Kishikawa (JPN)	9	12	11	3
18	Kim Hyok-bong (PRK); Pak Sin-hyok (PRK)	12	7	6	9
5	Koki Niwa (JPN); Kenta Matsudaira (JPN)	10	11	11	11
8	Lee Jung-woo (KOR); Kim Min-seok (KOR)	6	13	10	11	6
2	Ma Long (CHN); Zhang Jike (CHN)	11	11	12	4	11

Semifinals
1	Xu Xin (CHN); Fan Zhendong (CHN)	11	11	11	11	11
7	Gao Ning (SIN); Li Hu (SIN)	13	8	5	8	9
5	Koki Niwa (JPN); Kenta Matsudaira (JPN)	11	9	4	8	9
2	Ma Long (CHN); Zhang Jike (CHN)	8	11	11	11	11

Final
1	Xu Xin (CHN); Fan Zhendong (CHN)	12	3	7	6
2	Ma Long (CHN); Zhang Jike (CHN)	14	11	11	11

=== Top half ===
==== Section 1 ====
1st round	2nd round					3rd round
	1	Xu Xin (CHN); Fan Zhendong (CHN)	11	11	11
	22	Ajay Suwal (NEP); Shiva Sundar Gothe (NEP)	3	3	3
						1	Xu Xin (CHN); Fan Zhendong (CHN)	11	9	11	11
						14	Soumyajit Ghosh (IND); Harmeet Desai (IND)	5	11	1	5
	19	Omar Al-Kades (YEM); Fahad Gubran (YEM)	10	5	6
	14	Soumyajit Ghosh (IND); Harmeet Desai (IND)	12	11	11

==== Section 2 ====
1st round					2nd round					3rd round
					11	Kim Dong-hyun (KOR); Jeong Sang-eun (KOR)	11	11	11
	Moosa Munsif Ahmed (MDV); Mohamed Zeesth Naseem (MDV)	10	5	11	24	Waleed Al-Hajjai (QAT); Mohammed Al-Sulaiti (QAT)	3	8	5
24	Waleed Al-Hajjai (QAT); Mohammed Al-Sulaiti (QAT)	12	11	13						11	Kim Dong-hyun (KOR); Jeong Sang-eun (KOR)	11	11	5	3
										6	Tang Peng (HKG); Wong Chun Ting (HKG)	7	13	11	11
					25	Batbayaryn Mönkh-Orgil (MGL); Enkhbatyn Lkhagvasüren (MGL)	2	3	4
					6	Tang Peng (HKG); Wong Chun Ting (HKG)	11	11	11

==== Section 3 ====
1st round					2nd round					3rd round
					7	Gao Ning (SIN); Li Hu (SIN)	11	11	11
					27	Husain Al-Bahrani (KUW); Basel Al-Anssari (KUW)	7	6	4
										7	Gao Ning (SIN); Li Hu (SIN)	12	11	6	11
20	Kim Nam-chol (PRK); Ri Kwang-won (PRK)	11	11	11						9	Chiang Hung-chieh (TPE); Huang Sheng-sheng (TPE)	10	8	11	4
	Hatem Wadi (PLE); Malik Zahran (PLE)	1	2	4	20	Kim Nam-chol (PRK); Ri Kwang-won (PRK)	9	8	7
					9	Chiang Hung-chieh (TPE); Huang Sheng-sheng (TPE)	11	11	11

==== Section 4 ====
1st round	2nd round					3rd round
	16	Abdulaziz Al-Abbad (KSA); Naif Al-Jadai (KSA)	11	11	11
	28	Chang Hoi Wa (MAC); Che Chi Pan (MAC)	3	9	6
						16	Abdulaziz Al-Abbad (KSA); Naif Al-Jadai (KSA)	4	5	3
						4	Jun Mizutani (JPN); Seiya Kishikawa (JPN)	11	11	11
	17	Muhammad Asim Qureshi (PAK); Saleem Abbas Kazmi (PAK)	4	6	4
	4	Jun Mizutani (JPN); Seiya Kishikawa (JPN)	11	11	11

=== Bottom half ===
==== Section 5 ====
1st round	2nd round						3rd round
	3	Chuang Chih-yuan (TPE); Chen Chien-an (TPE)	5	4	11	8
	18	Kim Hyok-bong (PRK); Pak Sin-hyok (PRK)	11	11	6	11
							18	Kim Hyok-bong (PRK); Pak Sin-hyok (PRK)	5	11	11	11
							13	Yang Zi (SIN); Chen Feng (SIN)	11	7	6	9
	31	Che Long Lam (MAC); Xiao Zikang (MAC)	3	8	2
	13	Yang Zi (SIN); Chen Feng (SIN)	11	11	11

==== Section 6 ====
1st round					2nd round						3rd round
					12	Sharath Kamal (IND); Anthony Amalraj (IND)	6	11	11	12
	Battulgyn Egshiglen (MGL); Bayaraagiin Mönkhsaikhan (MGL)	8	6	6	29	Purshottam Bajracharya (NEP); Amar Lal Malla (NEP)	11	5	8	10
29	Purshottam Bajracharya (NEP); Amar Lal Malla (NEP)	11	11	11							12	Sharath Kamal (IND); Anthony Amalraj (IND)	5	5	4
											5	Koki Niwa (JPN); Kenta Matsudaira (JPN)	11	11	11
					30	Ali Al-Khadrawi (KSA); Akram Al-Ghamdi (KSA)	8	9	7
					5	Koki Niwa (JPN); Kenta Matsudaira (JPN)	11	11	11

==== Section 7 ====
1st round					2nd round					3rd round
					8	Lee Jung-woo (KOR); Kim Min-seok (KOR)	11	11	11
					23	Phinith Kongphet (LAO); Thavisack Phathaphone (LAO)	2	6	4
										8	Lee Jung-woo (KOR); Kim Min-seok (KOR)	11	11	8	11
26	Magd Al-Dhubhani (YEM); Muneer Al-Dhubhani (YEM)	11	11	12						10	Leung Chu Yan (HKG); Jiang Tianyi (HKG)	7	6	11	2
	Maizaru Adam Zahir (MDV); Mohamed Munthif Ahmed (MDV)	3	7	10	26	Magd Al-Dhubhani (YEM); Muneer Al-Dhubhani (YEM)	6	5	4
					10	Leung Chu Yan (HKG); Jiang Tianyi (HKG)	11	11	11

==== Section 8 ====
1st round	2nd round					3rd round
	15	Noshad Alamian (IRI); Afshin Norouzi (IRI)	11	12	11
	21	German Shemet (QAT); Abdulrahman Al-Naggar (QAT)	7	10	6
						15	Noshad Alamian (IRI); Afshin Norouzi (IRI)	4	7	3
						2	Ma Long (CHN); Zhang Jike (CHN)	11	11	11
	32	Jaber Al-Balhan (KUW); Mansour Al-Enezi (KUW)
	2	Ma Long (CHN); Zhang Jike (CHN)	W	O
