= 2015 World Table Tennis Championships – Men's doubles =

Men's doubles at the 2015 World Table Tennis Championships
- Venue: Suzhou International Expo Center
- Location: Suzhou, China
- Dates: 26 April–2 May
- Final score: 12–14, 11–7, 11–9, 9–11, 11–7, 11–9

Medalists
gold medal	Xu Xin; Zhang Jike	China
silver medal	Fan Zhendong; Zhou Yu	China
bronze medal	Lee Sang-su; Seo Hyun-deok	South Korea
bronze medal	Kenta Matsudaira; Koki Niwa	Japan

The 2015 World Table Tennis Championships men's doubles was the 53rd edition of the men's doubles championship.

Chen Chien-an and Chuang Chih-yuan were the defending champions, but chose not to participate this year.

Xu Xin and Zhang Jike won the title by defeating Fan Zhendong and Zhou Yu 12–14, 11–7, 11–9, 9–11, 11–7, 11–9 in the final.

== Seeds ==
Matches were best of 5 games in qualification and best of 7 games in the 64-player sized main draw.

1. (Chinese Taipei) Chiang Hung-chieh / (Chinese Taipei) Huang Sheng-sheng (second round)
2. (Japan) Kenta Matsudaira / (Japan) Koki Niwa (semifinals)
3. (Hong Kong) Tang Peng / (Hong Kong) Wong Chun Ting (third round)
4. (Chinese Taipei) Chen Chien-an / (Chinese Taipei) Chuang Chih-yuan (second round)
5. (Austria) Robert Gardos / (Austria) Daniel Habesohn (third round)
6. (Russia) Fedor Kuzmin / (Russia) Grigory Vlasov (second round)
7. (China) Xu Xin / (China) Zhang Jike (champions)
8. (Russia) Alexey Liventsov / (Russia) Mikhail Paikov (second round)
9. (Croatia) Tan Ruiwu / (Croatia) Wang Zengyi (second round)
10. (Spain) He Zhi Wen / (Spain) Carlos Machado (second round)
11. (Nigeria) Quadri Aruna / (Nigeria) Makanjuola Kazeem (second round)
12. (South Korea) Jung Young-sik / (South Korea) Kim Min-seok (quarterfinals)
13. (South Korea) Lee Sang-su / (South Korea) Seo Hyun-deok (semifinals)
14. (Sweden) Kristian Karlsson / (Sweden) Mattias Karlsson (third round)
15. (China) Fan Zhendong / (China) Zhou Yu (final)
16. (Japan) Masataka Morizono / (Japan) Yuya Oshima (quarterfinals)
17. (Germany) Timo Boll / (China) Ma Long (second round)
18. (Australia) David Powell / (Australia) Kane Townsend (first round)
19. (Portugal) Tiago Apolónia / (Portugal) João Monteiro (third round)
20. (Egypt) Khalid Assar / (Egypt) Omar Assar (second round)
21. (France) Simon Gauzy / (France) Emmanuel Lebesson (third round)
22. (Singapore) Gao Ning / (Singapore) Yang Zi (second round)
23. (Brazil) Hugo Calderano / (Brazil) Gustavo Tsuboi (third round)
24. (France) Adrien Mattenet / (France) Abdel-Kader Salifou (first round)
25. (Germany) Patrick Franziska / (Germany) Bastian Steger (second round)
26. (Egypt) Mohamed El-Beiali / (Egypt) El-sayed Lashin (first round)
27. (Portugal) Chen Diogo / (Portugal) Marcos Freitas (third round)
28. (Chile) Gustavo Gómez / (Chile) Manuel Moya (first round)
29. (North Korea) Kim Hyok-bong / (North Korea) Pak Sin-hyok (quarterfinals)
30. (Serbia) Marko Jevtović / (Serbia) Žolt Pete (second round)
31. (Argentina) Gaston Alto / (Argentina) Pablo Tabachnik (first round)
32. (Hong Kong) Ho Kwan Kit / (Hong Kong) Li Hon Ming (first round)

== Draw ==
=== Key ===
- Q = Qualifier
- w/o = Walkover
- w/d = Withdraw
- r = Retired
- DQ = Disqualified

=== Finals ===
Semifinals								Final
7	(China) Xu Xin (China) Zhang Jike	9	11	11	11	4	11
13	(South Korea) Lee Sang-su (South Korea) Seo Hyun-deok	11	6	9	6	11	3	7	(China) Xu Xin (China) Zhang Jike	12	11	11	9	11	11
15	(China) Fan Zhendong (China) Zhou Yu	11	11	11	11			15	(China) Fan Zhendong (China) Zhou Yu	14	7	9	11	7	9
2	(Japan) Kenta Matsudaira (Japan) Koki Niwa	6	7	6	6

=== Top half ===
==== Section 1 ====
First round
1	(Chinese Taipei) Chiang (Chinese Taipei) Huang	11	10	12	11	6	11
(India) Ghosh (India) Shetty	9	12	10	4	11	8
(Poland) Dyjas (Poland) Górak	11	11	11	7	11
24	(France) Mattenet (France) Salifou	8	9	2	11	9
25	(Germany) Franziska (Germany) Steger	11	11	9	11	11
(Finland) O'Connor (Finland) Oláh	3	5	11	6	7
(India) Kamal (India) Gnanasekaran	4	11	6	4	5
16	(Japan) Morizono (Japan) Oshima	11	9	11	11	11
14	(Sweden) K Karlsson (Sweden) M Karlsson	10	11	12	7	11	13
(Serbia) Karakašević (Slovenia) Tokič	12	3	10	11	9	11
(United States) Jha (United States) Wang	11	11	11	7	7	2	11
26	(Egypt) El-Beiali (Egypt) Lashin	7	6	9	11	11	11	7
17	(Germany) Boll (China) Ma	11	11	11	11
(Turkey) Gündüz (Turkey) Menge	4	9	3	5
(Paraguay) Aguirre (Argentina) Gilabert	7	4	9	4
7	(China) Xu (China) Zhang	11	11	11	11

Second round
1	(Chinese Taipei) Chiang (Chinese Taipei) Huang	11	11	11	5	11	9	9
(Poland) Dyjas (Poland) Górak	3	13	9	11	4	11	11
25	(Germany) Franziska (Germany) Steger	13	9	6	2	11	3
16	(Japan) Morizono (Japan) Oshima	11	11	11	11	9	11
14	(Sweden) K Karlsson (Sweden) M Karlsson	11	11	11	11
(United States) Jha (United States) Wang	9	6	6	8
17	(Germany) Boll (China) Ma	11	11	6	4	8	9
7	(China) Xu (China) Zhang	9	7	11	11	11	11

Third round
(Poland) Dyjas (Poland) Górak	7	6	7	10
16	(Japan) Morizono (Japan) Oshima	11	11	11	12
14	(Sweden) K Karlsson (Sweden) M Karlsson	7	8	12	4	8
7	(China) Xu (China) Zhang	11	11	10	11	11

Quarterfinals
16	(Japan) Morizono (Japan) Oshima	11	8	7	11	12	9	10
7	(China) Xu (China) Zhang	9	11	11	9	10	11	12

==== Section 2 ====
First round
5	(Austria) Gardos (Austria) Habesohn	11	11	11	11
(Italy) Mutti (Italy) Rech Daldosso	4	8	6	8
(Spain) Durán (Spain) Robles	11	9	11	12	11
32	(Hong Kong) Ho (Hong Kong) Li	8	11	11	10	5
31	(Argentina) Alto (Argentina) Tabachnik	11	9	11	5	9	8
(Greece) Gionis (Greece) Papageorgiou	7	11	5	11	11	11
(Belarus) Platonov (Belarus) Samsonov	7	10	5	4
13	(South Korea) Lee (South Korea) Seo	11	12	11	11
11	(Nigeria) Aruna (Nigeria) Kazeem	11	11	11	9	11
(Saudi Arabia) Al-Khadrawi (Saudi Arabia) Bu Shulaybi	6	6	4	11	4
(Brazil) Matsumoto (Brazil) Monteiro	11	11	11	11
28	(Chile) Gómez (Chile) Moya	5	3	9	9
21	(France) Gauzy (France) Lebesson	7	11	9	11	9	11	11
(Belgium) Devos (Belgium) Nuytinck	11	4	11	5	11	7	6
(Slovenia) Jorgić (Slovenia) Žibrat	4	2	2	6
4	(Chinese Taipei) Chen (Chinese Taipei) Chuang	11	11	11	11

Second round
5	(Austria) Gardos (Austria) Habesohn	11	11	11	11
(Spain) Durán (Spain) Robles	7	6	9	8
(Greece) Gionis (Greece) Papageorgiou	10	5	8	4
13	(South Korea) Lee (South Korea) Seo	12	11	11	11
11	(Nigeria) Aruna (Nigeria) Kazeem	11	7	5	6	5
(Brazil) Matsumoto (Brazil) Monteiro	7	11	11	11	11
21	(France) Gauzy (France) Lebesson	11	12	11	11
4	(Chinese Taipei) Chen (Chinese Taipei) Chuang	7	10	4	9

Third round
5	(Austria) Gardos (Austria) Habesohn	9	9	4	12	11	8
13	(South Korea) Lee (South Korea) Seo	11	11	11	10	8	11
(Brazil) Matsumoto (Brazil) Monteiro	11	7	8	12	6	11	11
21	(France) Gauzy (France) Lebesson	4	11	11	10	11	9	7

Quarterfinals
13	(South Korea) Lee (South Korea) Seo	11	6	6	11	11	6	11
(Brazil) Matsumoto (Brazil) Monteiro	6	11	11	5	7	11	7

=== Bottom half ===
==== Section 3 ====
First round
3	(Hong Kong) Tang (Hong Kong) Wong	11	11	11	11
(Luxembourg) Glod (Scotland) Rumgay	9	8	2	8
(Sweden) Gerell (Sweden) Persson	4	10	11	11	11	10	10
22	(Singapore) Gao (Singapore) Yang	11	12	6	5	5	12	12
30	(Serbia) Jevtović (Serbia) Pete	10	11	11	12	12	11
(Netherlands) Gommers (Netherlands) Tromer	12	5	5	10	14	9
(Mexico) Madrid (Guatemala) Ramírez	9	5	7	4
15	(China) Fan (China) Zhou	11	11	11	11
12	(South Korea) Jung (South Korea) Kim	11	11	4	7	11	11
(England) Drinkhall (England) Pitchford	7	6	11	11	8	8
(Czech Republic) Konečný (Czech Republic) Tregler	11	14	11	11
18	(Australia) Powell (Australia) Townsend	6	12	4	6
23	(Brazil) Calderano (Brazil) Tsuboi	11	7	11	11	9	11
(Israel) Ben Ari (Israel) Rabinovich	3	11	7	8	11	8
(Republic of the Congo) Idowu (Republic of the Congo) Saka	2	11	9	4	11	2
6	(Russia) Kuzmin (Russia) Vlasov	11	8	11	11	9	11

Second round
3	(Hong Kong) Tang (Hong Kong) Wong	11	13	14	13
22	(Singapore) Gao (Singapore) Yang	6	11	12	11
30	(Serbia) Jevtović (Serbia) Pete	8	3	8	5
15	(China) Fan (China) Zhou	11	11	11	11
12	(South Korea) Jung (South Korea) Kim	11	11	11	11
(Czech Republic) Konečný (Czech Republic) Tregler	9	9	5	7
23	(Brazil) Calderano (Brazil) Tsuboi	9	11	11	11	4	11
6	(Russia) Kuzmin (Russia) Vlasov	11	8	8	6	11	3

Third round
3	(Hong Kong) Tang (Hong Kong) Wong	6	10	9	11	3
15	(China) Fan (China) Zhou	11	12	11	9	11
12	(South Korea) Jung (South Korea) Kim	7	11	11	8	11	11
23	(Brazil) Calderano (Brazil) Tsuboi	11	8	8	11	8	3

Quarterfinals
15	(China) Fan (China) Zhou	15	13	11	11
12	(South Korea) Jung (South Korea) Kim	13	11	5	7

==== Section 4 ====
First round
8	(Russia) Liventsov (Russia) Paikov	8	12	11	6	11	11	11
(Iran) Ni Alamian (Iran) No Alamian	11	14	7	11	2	7	8
(Iran) Norouzi (Iran) Omrani	11	5	6	7
27	(Portugal) Chen (Portugal) Freitas	13	11	11	11
29	(North Korea) Kim (North Korea) Pak	11	3	11	11	11	13
(Denmark) Groth (Denmark) Sternberg	8	11	9	9	13	11
(Bulgaria) Alexandrov (Slovakia) Valuch	12	6	3	8	9
10	(Spain) He (Spain) Machado	10	11	11	11	11
9	(Croatia) Tan (Croatia) Wang	11	9	11	13	11
(Latvia) Burģis (Czech Republic) Jančařík	8	11	8	11	5
(Romania) Filimon (Romania) Ionescu	10	4	13	11	8	2
19	(Portugal) Apolónia (Portugal) Monteiro	12	11	11	8	11	11
20	(Egypt) K Assar (Egypt) O Assar	11	9	11	11	11
(Italy) Bobocica (Italy) Stoyanov	9	11	7	9	6
(Nigeria) Onaolapo (Nigeria) Toriola
2	(Japan) Matsudaira (Japan) Niwa	w/o

Second round
8	(Russia) Liventsov (Russia) Paikov	8	11	9	11	14	11	4
27	(Portugal) Chen (Portugal) Freitas	11	8	11	13	12	5	11
29	(North Korea) Kim (North Korea) Pak	10	11	8	11	11	11
10	(Spain) He (Spain) Machado	12	1	11	5	5	6
9	(Croatia) Tan (Croatia) Wang	2	7	11	9	8
19	(Portugal) Apolónia (Portugal) Monteiro	11	11	6	11	11
20	(Egypt) K Assar (Egypt) O Assar	10	5	6	7
2	(Japan) Matsudaira (Japan) Niwa	12	11	11	11

Third round
27	(Portugal) Chen (Portugal) Freitas	6	11	10	11	12	5
29	(North Korea) Kim (North Korea) Pak	11	9	12	9	14	11
19	(Portugal) Apolónia (Portugal) Monteiro	8	11	9	11	6	5
2	(Japan) Matsudaira (Japan) Niwa	11	9	11	3	11	11

Quarterfinals
29	(North Korea) Kim (North Korea) Pak	3	7	10	14
2	(Japan) Matsudaira (Japan) Niwa	11	11	12	16
