= Table tennis at the 2014 Asian Games – Men's team =

Men's team at the 2014 Asian Games
- Venue: Suwon Gymnasium
- Dates: 27–30 September 2014
- Competitors: 81 from 18 nations

Medalists
gold medal	China; Fan Zhendong, Ma Long, Xu Xin, Zhang Jike, Zhou Yu
silver medal	South Korea; Jeong Sang-eun, Joo Sae-hyuk, Kim Dong-hyun, Kim Min-seok, Lee Jung-woo
bronze medal	Japan; Seiya Kishikawa, Kenta Matsudaira, Jun Mizutani, Yuto Muramatsu, Koki Niwa
bronze medal	Chinese Taipei; Chen Chien-an, Chiang Hung-chieh, Chuang Chih-yuan, Huang Sheng-sheng, Wu Chih-chi

The men's team table tennis event was part of the table tennis programme and took place between September 27 and September 30, at the Suwon Gymnasium.

== Schedule ==
All times are Korea Standard Time (UTC+09:00)

Date	Time	Event
Saturday, 27 September 2014	10:00	Preliminary round 1
Saturday, 27 September 2014	14:00	Preliminary round 2
Saturday, 27 September 2014	18:00	Preliminary round 3
Sunday, 28 September 2014	10:00	Preliminary round 4
Sunday, 28 September 2014	14:00	Preliminary round 5
Sunday, 28 September 2014	20:00	Quarterfinals
Monday, 29 September 2014	17:00	Semifinals
Tuesday, 30 September 2014	16:30	Final

== Results ==
=== Preliminary round ===
==== Group A ====
Pos	Team	Pld	W	L	MF	MA	Pts	Qualification
1	China	3	3	0	9	2	6	Quarterfinals
2	Singapore	3	2	1	8	3	5	Quarterfinals
3	Saudi Arabia	3	1	2	3	6	4	
4	Laos	3	0	3	0	9	3	

Source: OCA

27 September	China	3–0	Laos

Zhang Jike	3–0	Thavisack Phathaphone	11–7, 11–4, 11–2
Fan Zhendong	3–0	Misay Phonsavat	11–6, 11–2, 11–2
Xu Xin	3–0	Phinith Kongphet	11–3, 11–4, 11–5

27 September	Singapore	3–0	Saudi Arabia

Gao Ning	3–0	Naif Al-Jadai	11–4, 11–5, 15–13
Li Hu	3–0	Abdulaziz Al-Abbad	11–9, 15–13, 11–8
Chen Feng	3–0	Akram Al-Ghamdi	11–5, 11–6, 11–7

27 September	China	3–0	Saudi Arabia

Xu Xin	3–0	Abdulaziz Al-Abbad	11–7, 11–5, 11–6
Ma Long	3–0	Naif Al-Jadai	11–5, 11–4, 11–5
Zhang Jike	3–0	Ali Al-Khadrawi	11–2, 11–2, 11–2

27 September	Singapore	3–0	Laos

Gao Ning	3–0	Thavisack Phathaphone	11–5, 11–4, 11–4
Li Hu	3–0	Phinith Kongphet	11–2, 11–3, 11–6
Clarence Chew	3–1	Misay Phonsavat	11–4, 11–3, 9–11, 11–6

28 September	China	3–2	Singapore

Zhang Jike	3–0	Li Hu	11–4, 11–3, 11–7
Fan Zhendong	2–3	Chen Feng	7–11, 7–11, 11–3, 11–5, 7–11
Ma Long	3–0	Clarence Chew	11–5, 11–2, 11–2
Fan Zhendong	2–3	Li Hu	7–11, 11–7, 1–11, 11–8, 7–11
Zhang Jike	3–0	Chen Feng	11–9, 11–4, 11–2

28 September	Saudi Arabia	3–0	Laos

Naif Al-Jadai	3–1	Thavisack Phathaphone	11–5, 8–11, 11–9, 11–7
Abdulaziz Al-Abbad	3–0	Phinith Kongphet	11–5, 11–6, 11–6
Mohammed Al-Sharif	3–0	Misay Phonsavat	11–6, 11–9, 11–5

==== Group B ====
Pos	Team	Pld	W	L	MF	MA	Pts	Qualification
1	South Korea	3	3	0	9	0	6	Quarterfinals
2	India	3	2	1	6	3	5	Quarterfinals
3	Kuwait	3	1	2	3	7	4	
4	Nepal	3	0	3	1	9	1	

Source: OCA

27 September	South Korea	3–0	Nepal

—	3–0	—	Walkover
—	3–0	—	Walkover
—	3–0	—	Walkover

27 September	India	3–0	Kuwait

Soumyajit Ghosh	3–1	Husain Al-Bahrani	11–1, 11–5, 5–11, 11–6
Sharath Kamal	3–0	Jaber Al-Balhan	11–5, 12–10, 11–5
Anthony Amalraj	3–0	Basel Al-Anssari	11–5, 11–8, 11–2

27 September	South Korea	3–0	Kuwait

Joo Sae-hyuk	3–0	Jaber Al-Balhan	11–2, 11–5, 11–3
Lee Jung-woo	3–0	Husain Al-Bahrani	11–3, 11–3, 11–6
Jeong Sang-eun	3–0	Basel Al-Anssari	11–1, 11–5, 11–5

27 September	India	3–0	Nepal

—	3–0	—	Walkover
—	3–0	—	Walkover
—	3–0	—	Walkover

28 September	South Korea	3–0	India

Joo Sae-hyuk	3–0	Sharath Kamal	11–8, 11–5, 12–10
Jeong Sang-eun	3–0	Harmeet Desai	11–6, 11–8, 11–6
Lee Jung-woo	3–0	Soumyajit Ghosh	11–4, 11–1, 11–8

28 September	Kuwait	3–1	Nepal

Jaber Al-Balhan	3–0	Shiva Sundar Gothe	11–7, 12–10, 11–8
Husain Al-Bahrani	3–1	Deep Saun	9–11, 11–5, 11–5, 17–15
Basel Al-Anssari	1–3	Ajay Suwal	11–5, 8–11, 6–11, 8–11
Husain Al-Bahrani	3–0	Shiva Sundar Gothe	11–7, 11–7, 11–3

==== Group C ====
Pos	Team	Pld	W	L	MF	MA	Pts	Qualification
1	Japan	4	4	0	12	2	8	Quarterfinals
2	Chinese Taipei	4	3	1	11	3	7	Quarterfinals
3	Pakistan	4	2	2	6	8	6	
4	Macau	4	1	3	5	9	5	
5	Maldives	4	0	4	0	12	4	

Source: OCA

27 September	Chinese Taipei	3–0	Maldives

Chen Chien-an	3–0	Mohamed Zeesth Naseem	11–4, 11–4, 11–2
Huang Sheng-sheng	3–0	Moosa Munsif Ahmed	11–6, 11–8, 11–5
Wu Chih-chi	3–0	Maizaru Adam Zahir	11–1, 11–1, 11–1

27 September	Macau	2–3	Pakistan

Che Chi Pan	0–3	Muhammad Asim Qureshi	8–11, 13–15, 7–11
Chang Hoi Wa	2–3	Muhammad Rameez	6–11, 11–6, 5–11, 11–9, 10–12
Xiao Zikang	3–2	Saleem Abbas Kazmi	11–7, 7–11, 11–7, 8–11, 11–8
Chang Hoi Wa	3–0	Muhammad Asim Qureshi	13–11, 11–9, 11–7
Che Chi Pan	2–3	Muhammad Rameez	7–11, 11–7, 5–11, 11–4, 9–11

27 September	Japan	3–0	Maldives

Yuto Muramatsu	3–0	Moosa Munsif Ahmed	11–5, 11–3, 11–6
Jun Mizutani	3–0	Mohamed Zeesth Naseem	11–1, 11–4, 11–2
Kenta Matsudaira	3–0	Mohamed Munthif Ahmed	11–4, 11–1, 11–6

27 September	Chinese Taipei	3–0	Macau

Chuang Chih-yuan	3–0	Chang Hoi Wa	11–5, 11–7, 11–7
Chen Chien-an	3–0	Che Chi Pan	11–5, 11–5, 11–5
Chiang Hung-chieh	3–0	Che Long Lam	11–4, 11–2, 11–6

27 September	Japan	3–0	Pakistan

Yuto Muramatsu	3–0	Muhammad Rameez	11–4, 11–4, 11–5
Kenta Matsudaira	3–0	Muhammad Asim Qureshi	12–10, 11–4, 11–4
Koki Niwa	3–0	Saleem Abbas Kazmi	11–4, 11–1, 11–5

27 September	Macau	3–0	Maldives

Chang Hoi Wa	3–0	Maizaru Adam Zahir	11–4, 11–7, 11–8
Xiao Zikang	3–2	Mohamed Zeesth Naseem	8–11, 11–13, 11–13, 11–3, 11–4
Che Chi Pan	3–2	Moosa Munsif Ahmed	11–6, 11–8, 8–11, 7–11, 11–5

28 September	Japan	3–0	Macau

Yuto Muramatsu	3–0	Che Long Lam	11–3, 11–5, 11–3
Kenta Matsudaira	3–0	Xiao Zikang	11–2, 11–2, 11–5
Seiya Kishikawa	3–0	Chang Hoi Wa	11–3, 11–7, 11–6

28 September	Pakistan	0–3	Chinese Taipei

Muhammad Rameez	0–3	Chen Chien-an	4–11, 2–11, 1–11
Muhammad Asim Qureshi	0–3	Chiang Hung-chieh	3–11, 5–11, 8–11
Saleem Abbas Kazmi	0–3	Huang Sheng-sheng	9–11, 4–11, 5–11

28 September	Japan	3–2	Chinese Taipei

Jun Mizutani	3–1	Chuang Chih-yuan	11–7, 4–11, 11–9, 11–8
Koki Niwa	0–3	Chen Chien-an	7–11, 6–11, 9–11
Yuto Muramatsu	3–0	Huang Sheng-sheng	11–4, 11–9, 11–6
Koki Niwa	2–3	Chuang Chih-yuan	11–8, 6–11, 12–10, 13–15, 1–11
Jun Mizutani	3–0	Chen Chien-an	14–12, 11–9, 11–8

28 September	Pakistan	3–0	Maldives

Muhammad Asim Qureshi	3–0	Mohamed Zeesth Naseem	11–2, 11–8, 11–7
Muhammad Rameez	3–2	Moosa Munsif Ahmed	8–11, 11–8, 11–6, 9–11, 11–6
Saleem Abbas Kazmi	3–1	Maizaru Adam Zahir	4–11, 11–6, 11–7, 11–9

==== Group D ====
Pos	Team	Pld	W	L	MF	MA	Pts	Qualification
1	Hong Kong	4	4	0	12	1	8	Quarterfinals
2	North Korea	4	3	1	10	3	7	Quarterfinals
3	Yemen	4	2	2	6	8	6	
4	Mongolia	4	1	3	4	10	5	
5	Qatar	4	0	4	2	12	4	

Source: OCA

27 September	Hong Kong	3–0	Mongolia

Cheung Yuk	3–0	Enkhbatyn Lkhagvasüren	11–5, 11–7, 11–7
Wong Chun Ting	3–0	Batkhishigiin Bilegt	11–8, 11–8, 11–5
Leung Chu Yan	3–0	Batbayaryn Mönkh-Orgil	11–2, 11–2, 11–6

27 September	Qatar	1–3	Yemen

Waleed Al-Hajjai	2–3	Muneer Al-Dhubhani	8–11, 11–7, 7–11, 11–5, 5–11
Abdulrahman Al-Naggar	0–3	Omar Al-Kades	3–11, 8–11, 12–14
German Shemet	3–1	Fahad Gubran	3–11, 11–4, 13–11, 11–9
Abdulrahman Al-Naggar	1–3	Muneer Al-Dhubhani	7–11, 11–9, 7–11, 9–11

27 September	North Korea	3–0	Mongolia

Kim Nam-chol	3–0	Battulgyn Egshiglen	11–5, 11–3, 11–9
Kim Hyok-bong	3–0	Batkhishigiin Bilegt	11–2, 11–3, 11–7
Pak Sin-hyok	3–0	Bayaraagiin Mönkhsaikhan	11–2, 11–4, 11–3

27 September	Hong Kong	3–0	Qatar

Tang Peng	3–0	German Shemet	11–2, 11–1, 11–9
Jiang Tianyi	3–0	Waleed Al-Hajjai	11–3, 11–6, 11–4
Wong Chun Ting	3–0	Mohammed Al-Sulaiti	11–1, 11–3, 11–1

27 September	North Korea	3–0	Yemen

Pak Sin-hyok	3–0	Magd Al-Dhubhani	11–6, 11–5, 11–5
Kim Hyok-bong	3–0	Fahad Gubran	11–4, 11–6, 11–4
Choe Il	3–1	Omar Al-Kades	11–8, 7–11, 11–8, 11–5

27 September	Qatar	1–3	Mongolia

German Shemet	1–3	Enkhbatyn Lkhagvasüren	8–11, 9–11, 11–7, 6–11
Waleed Al-Hajjai	3–2	Batkhishigiin Bilegt	11–13, 9–11, 14–12, 11–4, 11–8
Mohammed Al-Sulaiti	0–3	Batbayaryn Mönkh-Orgil	11–13, 7–11, 6–11
Waleed Al-Hajjai	1–3	Enkhbatyn Lkhagvasüren	7–11, 9–11, 11–7, 10–12

28 September	North Korea	3–0	Qatar

Kim Nam-chol	3–0	German Shemet	11–6, 14–12, 11–7
Pak Sin-hyok	3–0	Mohammed Al-Sulaiti	11–4, 11–6, 11–9
Choe Il	3–0	Waleed Al-Hajjai	11–2, 11–3, 11–5

28 September	Yemen	0–3	Hong Kong

Fahad Gubran	1–3	Wong Chun Ting	11–8, 1–11, 9–11, 3–11
Magd Al-Dhubhani	0–3	Jiang Tianyi	5–11, 10–12, 7–11
Muneer Al-Dhubhani	0–3	Cheung Yuk	8–11, 4–11, 5–11

28 September	North Korea	1–3	Hong Kong

Pak Sin-hyok	0–3	Tang Peng	8–11, 8–11, 5–11
Kim Hyok-bong	3–1	Jiang Tianyi	11–4, 14–16, 11–8, 11–8
Kim Nam-chol	0–3	Wong Chun Ting	12–14, 6–11, 9–11
Kim Hyok-bong	2–3	Tang Peng	7–11, 11–9, 11–5, 7–11, 8–11

28 September	Yemen	3–1	Mongolia

Omar Al-Kades	3–1	Enkhbatyn Lkhagvasüren	11–7, 10–12, 11–6, 11–5
Muneer Al-Dhubhani	2–3	Batkhishigiin Bilegt	11–6, 7–11, 9–11, 11–4, 2–11
Magd Al-Dhubhani	3–0	Batbayaryn Mönkh-Orgil	11–4, 11–8, 11–8
Muneer Al-Dhubhani	3–1	Enkhbatyn Lkhagvasüren	11–6, 13–11, 14–16, 11–7

=== Knockout round ===
Quarterfinals
A1	China	3
India	0
North Korea	2
C1	Japan	3
D1	Hong Kong	2
Chinese Taipei	3
Singapore	0
B1	South Korea	3

Semifinals
A1	China	3
C1	Japan	0
Chinese Taipei	1
B1	South Korea	3

Final
A1	China	3
B1	South Korea	0

==== Quarterfinals ====
28 September	China	3–0	India

Xu Xin	3–0	Sharath Kamal	11–7, 11–7, 11–7
Ma Long	3–1	Harmeet Desai	11–5, 7–11, 11–2, 11–6
Fan Zhendong	3–0	Sanil Shetty	11–1, 13–11, 11–1

28 September	North Korea	2–3	Japan

Pak Sin-hyok	3–2	Kenta Matsudaira	11–2, 7–11, 8–11, 11–9, 11–6
Kim Hyok-bong	2–3	Jun Mizutani	11–9, 12–10, 10–12, 3–11, 5–11
Choe Il	3–2	Koki Niwa	11–7, 9–11, 8–11, 11–7, 16–14
Pak Sin-hyok	0–3	Jun Mizutani	9–11, 6–11, 7–11
Kim Hyok-bong	0–3	Kenta Matsudaira	9–11, 9–11, 9–11

28 September	Hong Kong	2–3	Chinese Taipei

Wong Chun Ting	2–3	Chuang Chih-yuan	11–8, 11–4, 10–12, 7–11, 7–11
Tang Peng	3–1	Chen Chien-an	12–14, 13–11, 11–9, 11–7
Jiang Tianyi	2–3	Chiang Hung-chieh	11–8, 8–11, 11–5, 11–13, 9–11
Tang Peng	3–2	Chuang Chih-yuan	9–11, 2–11, 12–10, 11–6, 11–4
Wong Chun Ting	2–3	Chen Chien-an	11–5, 14–12, 12–14, 9–11, 10–12

28 September	Singapore	0–3	South Korea

Gao Ning	0–3	Jeong Sang-eun	6–11, 8–11, 8–11
Chen Feng	0–3	Joo Sae-hyuk	6–11, 4–11, 5–11
Li Hu	0–3	Lee Jung-woo	9–11, 7–11, 9–11

==== Semifinals ====
29 September	China	3–0	Japan

Ma Long	3–0	Kenta Matsudaira	11–6, 11–4, 11–6
Xu Xin	3–1	Jun Mizutani	5–11, 11–2, 11–4, 13–11
Zhang Jike	3–1	Yuto Muramatsu	11–5, 6–11, 11–3, 11–3

29 September	Chinese Taipei	1–3	South Korea

Chen Chien-an	0–3	Joo Sae-hyuk	6–11, 7–11, 8–11
Chuang Chih-yuan	3–0	Jeong Sang-eun	11–8, 12–10, 11–5
Chiang Hung-chieh	0–3	Lee Jung-woo	9–11, 9–11, 8–11
Chuang Chih-yuan	1–3	Joo Sae-hyuk	11–7, 12–14, 4–11, 1–11

==== Final ====
30 September	China	3–0	South Korea

Ma Long	3–1	Joo Sae-hyuk	11–9, 11–9, 10–12, 17–15
Xu Xin	3–0	Lee Jung-woo	11–3, 11–5, 11–6
Zhang Jike	3–0	Jeong Sang-eun	11–1, 11–9, 11–7

== Non-participating athletes ==
- Zhou Yu (CHN)
- Kim Dong-hyun (KOR)
- Kim Min-seok (KOR)
- Mansour Al-Enezi (KUW)
- Purshottam Bajracharya (NEP)
- Amar Lal Malla (NEP)
- Ri Kwang-won (PRK)
- Yang Zi (SIN)
