= Table tennis at the 2014 Asian Games – Men's singles =

Men's singles at the 2014 Asian Games
- Venue: Suwon Gymnasium
- Dates: 29 September – 4 October 2014
- Competitors: 44 from 24 nations

Medalists
gold medal	Xu Xin	China
silver medal	Fan Zhendong	China
bronze medal	Joo Sae-hyuk	South Korea
bronze medal	Chuang Chih-yuan	Chinese Taipei

The men's singles table tennis event was part of the table tennis programme and took place between September 29 and October 4, 2014, at the Suwon Gymnasium.

== Schedule ==
All times are Korea Standard Time (UTC+09:00)

Date	Time	Event
Monday, 29 September 2014	13:30	1st round
Wednesday, 1 October 2014	14:30	2nd round
Thursday, 2 October 2014	13:00	3rd round
Thursday, 2 October 2014	19:00	Quarterfinals
Saturday, 4 October 2014	11:00	Semifinals
Saturday, 4 October 2014	13:00	Final

== Results ==
Legend

- WO — Won by walkover

=== Finals ===
Quarterfinals
1	Xu Xin (CHN)	13	11	11	11
5	Gao Ning (SIN)	11	9	5	5
8	Joo Sae-hyuk (KOR)	13	7	8	11	14	11
3	Jun Mizutani (JPN)	11	11	11	7	12	3
4	Chuang Chih-yuan (TPE)	11	11	5	11	11
Pak Sin-hyok (PRK)	6	8	11	7	8
6	Koki Niwa (JPN)	4	6	10	7
2	Fan Zhendong (CHN)	11	11	12	11

Semifinals
1	Xu Xin (CHN)	11	11	11	11
8	Joo Sae-hyuk (KOR)	2	5	2	7
4	Chuang Chih-yuan (TPE)	8	9	8	7
2	Fan Zhendong (CHN)	11	11	11	11

Final
1	Xu Xin (CHN)	11	5	11	11	12	11
2	Fan Zhendong (CHN)	6	11	13	7	10	8

=== Top half ===
==== Section 1 ====
1st round							2nd round						3rd round
							1	Xu Xin (CHN)	11	11	11	11
							29	Purshottam Bajracharya (NEP)	4	2	3	2
													1	Xu Xin (CHN)	10	6	11	10	11	11	11
27	Husain Al-Bahrani (KUW)	11	6	11	13	11							9	Chen Chien-an (TPE)	12	11	5	12	3	7	8
	Moosa Munsif Ahmed (MDV)	6	11	9	11	3	27	Husain Al-Bahrani (KUW)	2	5	2	5
							9	Chen Chien-an (TPE)	11	11	11	11

==== Section 2 ====
1st round									2nd round									3rd round
									11	Sharath Kamal (IND)	11	10	11	9	11	10	9
	Rashed Khaled Sanad (BRN)	6	6	9	10				18	Padasak Tanviriyavechakul (THA)	6	12	5	11	6	12	11
18	Padasak Tanviriyavechakul (THA)	11	11	11	12													18	Padasak Tanviriyavechakul (THA)	8	7	4	8
31	Abdulrahman Al-Naggar (QAT)	11	8	8	11	7	11	9										5	Gao Ning (SIN)	11	11	11	11
	Batkhishigiin Bilegt (MGL)	9	11	11	5	11	7	11		Batkhishigiin Bilegt (MGL)	3	2	2	1
									5	Gao Ning (SIN)	11	11	11	11

==== Section 3 ====
1st round						2nd round							3rd round
						8	Joo Sae-hyuk (KOR)	11	11	9	11	11
	Phinith Kongphet (LAO)	7	1	1	3	17	Choe Il (PRK)	3	9	11	5	7
17	Choe Il (PRK)	11	11	11	11								8	Joo Sae-hyuk (KOR)	11	11	11	11
20	Naif Al-Jadai (KSA)	11	11	11	11								10	Jiang Tianyi (HKG)	6	8	1	9
	Malik Zahran (PLE)	3	2	3	7	20	Naif Al-Jadai (KSA)	2	3	4	3
						10	Jiang Tianyi (HKG)	11	11	11	11

==== Section 4 ====
1st round				2nd round						3rd round
				13	Noshad Alamian (IRI)	11	11	11	11
	Muhammad Rameez (PAK)	W	O		Muhammad Rameez (PAK)	6	5	4	7
32	Che Long Lam (MAC)									13	Noshad Alamian (IRI)	4	7	11	6	5
										3	Jun Mizutani (JPN)	11	11	6	11	11
				26	Muneer Al-Dhubhani (YEM)	2	4	5	5
				3	Jun Mizutani (JPN)	11	11	11	11

=== Bottom half ===
==== Section 5 ====
1st round						2nd round						3rd round
						4	Chuang Chih-yuan (TPE)	11	11	11	11
						22	Muhammad Asim Qureshi (PAK)	3	7	3	5
												4	Chuang Chih-yuan (TPE)	11	11	10	11	11	17
19	Kirill Gerassimenko (KAZ)	11	11	11	11							15	Kim Dong-hyun (KOR)	9	4	12	6	13	15
	Hatem Wadi (PLE)	5	4	2	7	19	Kirill Gerassimenko (KAZ)	11	8	7	3
						15	Kim Dong-hyun (KOR)	13	11	11	11

==== Section 6 ====
1st round						2nd round									3rd round
						14	Soumyajit Ghosh (IND)	11	11	11	11
	German Shemet (QAT)	10	6	5	6	30	Thavisack Phathaphone (LAO)	5	7	5	4
30	Thavisack Phathaphone (LAO)	12	11	11	11										14	Soumyajit Ghosh (IND)	11	7	8	11	8
23	Rachid El-Boubou (LIB)	5	6	4	2											Pak Sin-hyok (PRK)	2	11	11	13	11
	Pak Sin-hyok (PRK)	11	11	11	11		Pak Sin-hyok (PRK)	13	11	10	4	11	1	11
						7	Tang Peng (HKG)	11	9	12	11	9	11	7

==== Section 7 ====
1st round						2nd round							3rd round
						6	Koki Niwa (JPN)	12	12	11	11
	Jaber Al-Balhan (KUW)	5	7	5	6	21	Abdulaziz Al-Abbad (KSA)	10	10	5	8
21	Abdulaziz Al-Abbad (KSA)	11	11	11	11								6	Koki Niwa (JPN)	8	11	11	11	13
25	Omar Al-Kades (YEM)	11	11	11	11								16	Afshin Norouzi (IRI)	11	5	7	9	11
	Mohamed Zeesth Naseem (MDV)	7	3	2	6	25	Omar Al-Kades (YEM)	3	11	2	3	9
						16	Afshin Norouzi (IRI)	11	4	11	11	11

==== Section 8 ====
1st round								2nd round						3rd round
								12	Li Hu (SIN)	11	11	11	11
	Shiva Sundar Gothe (NEP)	14	6	11	3	8	7	24	Enkhbatyn Lkhagvasüren (MGL)	1	2	6	5
24	Enkhbatyn Lkhagvasüren (MGL)	12	11	5	11	11	11							12	Li Hu (SIN)	10	7	6	3
														2	Fan Zhendong (CHN)	12	11	11	11
								28	Chang Hoi Wa (MAC)	1	6	2	4
								2	Fan Zhendong (CHN)	11	11	11	11
