= 2017 Asian Table Tennis Championships =

- Date: 9–16 April 2017
- Edition: 23rd
- Location: Wuxi, China
- Venue: Wuxi Sports Center Gym

Champions

Men's singles
- (China) Fan Zhendong

Women's singles
- (Japan) Miu Hirano

Men's doubles
- (China) Fan Zhendong / (China) Lin Gaoyuan

Women's doubles
- (China) Chen Meng / (China) Zhu Yuling

Mixed doubles
- (China) Zhou Yu / (China) Chen Xingtong

Men's team
- China

Women's team
- China
← 2015 ·	Asian Table Tennis Championships	· 2019 →

The Seamaster 2017 ITTF-Asian Championships were held in Wuxi, China, from 9 to 16 April 2017.

== Schedule ==
Five individual and two team events were contested.

Rounds in main draw
Finals

Date	9 April		10 April		11 April			12 April		13 April			14 April			15 April		16 April	
Men's singles										R1		R2	R3		R4	QF		SF	F
Women's singles								R1		R2			R3	R4	QF	SF	F		
Men's doubles								R1		R2		R3	QF			SF	F		
Women's doubles										R1	R2	R3	QF					SF	F
Mixed doubles					R1		R2	R3	QF	SF			F						
Men's team	GS	QF	POS	QF	POS	SF	F												
Women's team	GS	QF	POS	QF	POS	SF	F												

== Medal summary ==
=== Medal table ===
* Host nation (China)

Rank	Nation	Gold	Silver	Bronze	Total
1	China*	6	3	4	13
2	Japan	1	2	6	9
3	South Korea	0	2	1	3
4	Hong Kong	0	0	2	2
5	Chinese Taipei	0	0	1	1
Totals (5 entries)		7	7	14	28

=== Events ===
Event	Gold	Silver	Bronze
Men's singles	(China) Fan Zhendong	(South Korea) Jeong Sangeun	(China) Zhang Jike
Men's singles	(China) Fan Zhendong	(South Korea) Jeong Sangeun	(Japan) Koki Niwa
Women's singles	(Japan) Miu Hirano	(China) Chen Meng	(China) Liu Shiwen
Women's singles	(Japan) Miu Hirano	(China) Chen Meng	(China) Zhu Yuling
Men's doubles	(China) Fan Zhendong (China) Lin Gaoyuan	(China) Fang Bo (China) Zhou Yu	(Hong Kong) Wong Chun Ting (Hong Kong) Ho Kwan Kit
Men's doubles	(China) Fan Zhendong (China) Lin Gaoyuan	(China) Fang Bo (China) Zhou Yu	(Japan) Koki Niwa (Japan) Maharu Yoshimura
Women's doubles	(China) Chen Meng (China) Zhu Yuling	(China) Chen Ke (China) Wang Manyu	(Japan) Mima Ito (Japan) Hina Hayata
Women's doubles	(China) Chen Meng (China) Zhu Yuling	(China) Chen Ke (China) Wang Manyu	(Japan) Hitomi Sato (Japan) Honoka Hashimoto
Mixed doubles	(China) Zhou Yu (China) Chen Xingtong	(Japan) Masataka Morizono (Japan) Mima Ito	(China) Fang Bo (China) Wang Manyu
Mixed doubles	(China) Zhou Yu (China) Chen Xingtong	(Japan) Masataka Morizono (Japan) Mima Ito	(Japan) Tazoe Kenta (Japan) Maeda Miyu
Men's team	China; Ma Long; Xu Xin; Fan Zhendong; Zhang Jike; Cui Qinglei	South Korea; Lee Sangsu; Jeoung Young-sik; Kim Min-seok; Jang Woojin; Jeong Sangeun	Chinese Taipei; Chen Chien-An; Liao Cheng-Ting; Yang Heng-Wei; Hung Tzu-Hsiang; Sun Chia-Hung
Men's team	China; Ma Long; Xu Xin; Fan Zhendong; Zhang Jike; Cui Qinglei	South Korea; Lee Sangsu; Jeoung Young-sik; Kim Min-seok; Jang Woojin; Jeong Sangeun	Japan; Kenta Matsudaira; Koki Niwa; Yuya Oshima; Maharu Yoshimura; Tomokazu Harimoto
Women's team	China; Ding Ning; Liu Shiwen; Zhu Yuling; Chen Meng; Wu Yang	Japan; Mima Ito; Miu Hirano; Hitomi Sato; Hina Hayata; Miyu Kato	Hong Kong; Doo Hoi Kem; Lee Ho Ching; Ng Wing Nam; Soo Wai Yam Minn; Mak Tze Wing
Women's team	China; Ding Ning; Liu Shiwen; Zhu Yuling; Chen Meng; Wu Yang	Japan; Mima Ito; Miu Hirano; Hitomi Sato; Hina Hayata; Miyu Kato	South Korea; Yang Ha-eun; Kim Kyung-ah; Suh Hyowon; Lee Zion; Lee Hyunju

== See also ==
- 2017 Asian Cup Table Tennis Tournament
