= 2014 World Team Table Tennis Championships =

- Venue: Yoyogi National Gymnasium; Tokyo Metropolitan Gymnasium
- Location: Tokyo, Japan
- Dates: 28 April–5 May

Champions
- Men: China
- Women: China

The 2014 World Team Table Tennis Championships were held in Tokyo from 28 April to 5 May 2014. The Championships was staged in Japan for the seventh time and was the 52nd edition of the team competition.

The decision was announced by ITTF in May 2011, after several sporting events including the 2011 World Figure Skating Championships were shifted from Japan due to the Tōhoku earthquake and the following Fukushima Daiichi nuclear disaster.

== Seeding ==
The first division (Championship Division) comprised 24 teams. The top eighteen teams of the first division and the top two teams of the second division at the 2012 World Team Championships were guaranteed a place in the competition. The other four spots were based on the latest ITTF Computer World Team Ranking before the Championships.

Qualification	Men's team	Women's team
Top eighteen in 2012	China; Germany; Japan; South Korea; Austria; Sweden; Chinese Taipei; Singapore; Hong Kong Belarus; Portugal; Poland; North Korea; Russia; Greece; Serbia; Hungary; France	China; Singapore; Hong Kong; South Korea; Japan; Netherlands; Germany; Poland; North Korea Austria; Hungary; Romania; Belarus; Chinese Taipei; Russia; Croatia; Czech Republic
Top two of the 2nd Division in 2012	Ukraine; Romania	Australia; Luxembourg
ITTF World Team Ranking	Croatia; Brazil; Denmark; Spain	Ukraine; United States; Slovakia; Serbia; France

== Medal summary ==
=== Events ===
Event	Gold	Silver	Bronze
Men's team	China; Fan Zhendong; Ma Long; Wang Hao; Xu Xin; Zhang Jike	Germany; Timo Boll; Patrick Franziska; Steffen Mengel; Dimitrij Ovtcharov	Chinese Taipei; Chen Chien-an; Chiang Hung-chieh; Chuang Chih-yuan; Huang Sheng-sheng; Wu Chih-chi
Men's team	China; Fan Zhendong; Ma Long; Wang Hao; Xu Xin; Zhang Jike	Germany; Timo Boll; Patrick Franziska; Steffen Mengel; Dimitrij Ovtcharov	Japan; Seiya Kishikawa; Kenta Matsudaira; Jun Mizutani; Koki Niwa; Masato Shiono
Women's team	China; Chen Meng; Ding Ning; Li Xiaoxia; Liu Shiwen; Zhu Yuling	Japan; Sayaka Hirano; Yuka Ishigaki; Kasumi Ishikawa; Sakura Mori; Saki Tashiro	Hong Kong; Doo Hoi Kem; Jiang Huajun; Lee Ho Ching; Ng Wing Nam; Tie Ya Na
Women's team	China; Chen Meng; Ding Ning; Li Xiaoxia; Liu Shiwen; Zhu Yuling	Japan; Sayaka Hirano; Yuka Ishigaki; Kasumi Ishikawa; Sakura Mori; Saki Tashiro	Singapore; Feng Tianwei; Li Siyun Isabelle; Yee Herng Hwee; Yu Mengyu

=== Medal table ===
Rank	Nation	Gold	Silver	Bronze	Total
1	China	2	0	0	2
2	Japan	0	1	1	2
3	Germany	0	1	0	1
4	Chinese Taipei	0	0	1	1
4	Hong Kong	0	0	1	1
4	Singapore	0	0	1	1
Totals (6 entries)		2	2	4	8

== Results ==
=== Men's team ===
Round of 16
Greece	1
Austria	3
Chinese Taipei	3
Croatia	1
Poland	1
Portugal	3
Singapore	3
Sweden	1

Quarterfinals
China	3
Austria	0
Chinese Taipei	3
South Korea	2
Japan	3
Portugal	0
Singapore	0
Germany	3

Semifinals
China	3
Chinese Taipei	0
Japan	1
Germany	3

Final
China	3
Germany	1

=== Women's team ===
Round of 16
Ukraine	0
North Korea	3
South Korea	2
Romania	3
Belarus	0
Germany	3
Chinese Taipei	0
Netherlands	3

Quarterfinals
China	3
North Korea	0
Romania	1
Singapore	3
Hong Kong	3
Germany	0
Netherlands	2
Japan	3

Semifinals
China	3
Singapore	0
Hong Kong	1
Japan	3

Final
China	3
Japan	0
