= Fan Zhendong =

Chinese table tennis player

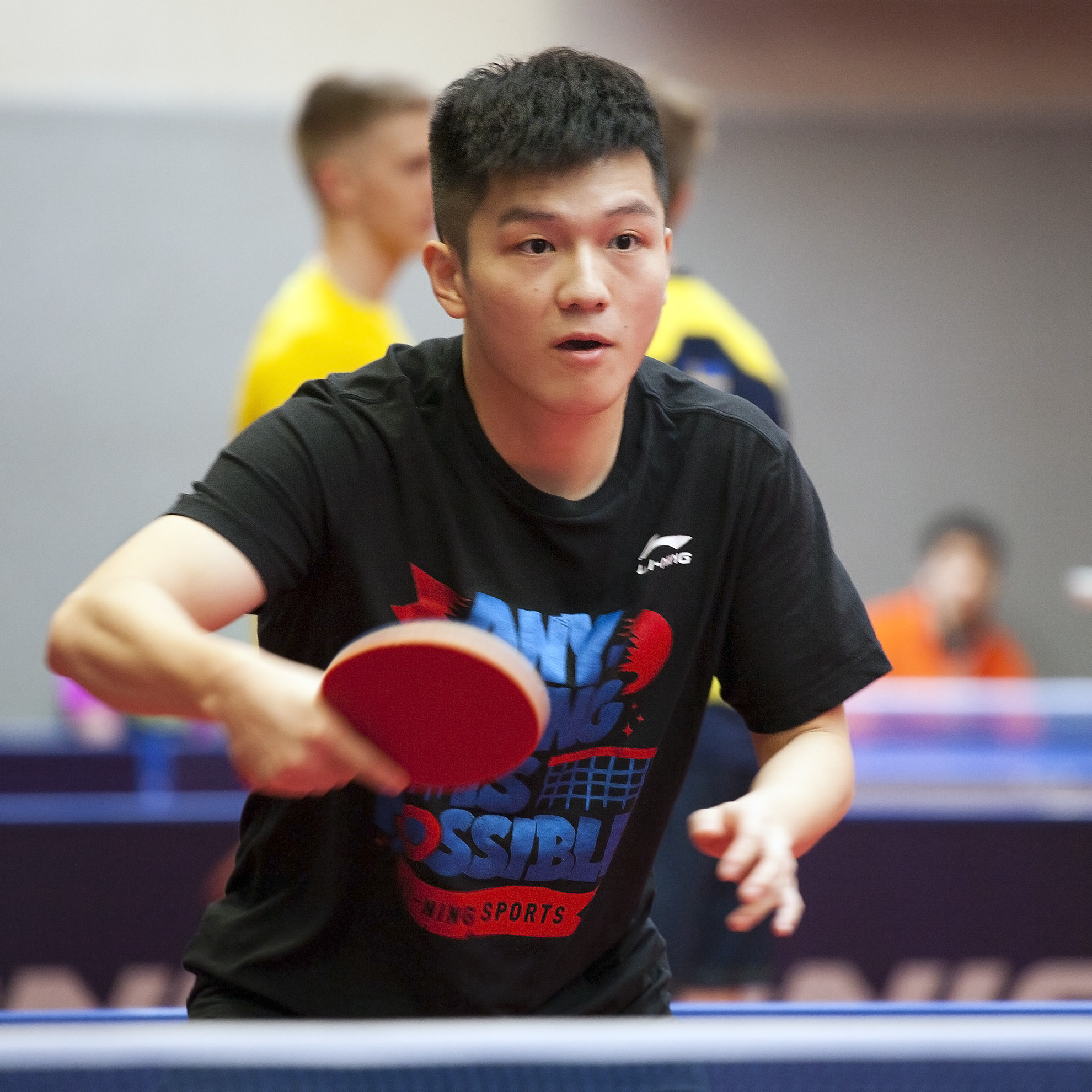
- Fan in 2017

Personal information
- Native name: 樊振东
- Nicknames: "Xiao Pang" (Little Fatty), "Dong Ge" (Dong Brother)
- Born: 22 January 1997 (age 29) Guangzhou, China
- Height: 1.73 m (5 ft 8 in)

Sport
- Sport: Table tennis
- Club: Borussia Düsseldorf (Bundesliga)
- Playing style: Right-handed, shakehand grip
- Equipment: Butterfly Fan Zhendong ALC with DHS Hurricane 3 National (Blue Sponge) (FH, Black), Butterfly Dignics 09c (BH, Red)
- Highest ranking: 1 (April 2018)
Medal record
Event	1st	2nd	3rd
Olympic Games	3	1	0
World Championships	9	2	2
World Cup / Cup Finals	9	2	0
Total	21	5	2
Men's table tennis
Representing China
Olympic Games
Gold medal – first place	2020 Tokyo	Team
Gold medal – first place	2024 Paris	Singles
Gold medal – first place	2024 Paris	Team
Silver medal – second place	2020 Tokyo	Singles
World Championships
Gold medal – first place	2014 Tokyo	Team
Gold medal – first place	2016 Kuala Lumpur	Team
Gold medal – first place	2017 Düsseldorf	Doubles
Gold medal – first place	2018 Halmstad	Team
Gold medal – first place	2021 Houston	Singles
Gold medal – first place	2022 Chengdu	Team
Gold medal – first place	2023 Durban	Singles
Gold medal – first place	2023 Durban	Doubles
Gold medal – first place	2024 Busan	Team
Silver medal – second place	2015 Suzhou	Doubles
Silver medal – second place	2017 Düsseldorf	Singles
Bronze medal – third place	2015 Suzhou	Singles
Bronze medal – third place	2019 Budapest	Mixed doubles
World Cup
Gold medal – first place	2015 Dubai	Team
Gold medal – first place	2016 Saarbrücken	Singles
Gold medal – first place	2018 London	Team
Gold medal – first place	2018 Paris	Singles
Gold medal – first place	2019 Tokyo	Team
Gold medal – first place	2019 Chengdu	Singles
Gold medal – first place	2020 Weihai	Singles
Gold medal – first place	2023 Chengdu	Mixed team
Silver medal – second place	2015 Halmstad	Singles
WTT Cup Finals
Gold medal – first place	2021 Singapore	Singles
Silver medal – second place	2023 Doha	Singles
ITTF World Tour Grand Finals
Gold medal – first place	2017 Astana	Singles
Gold medal – first place	2019 Zhengzhou	Singles
Gold medal – first place	2019 Zhengzhou	Doubles
Silver medal – second place	2015 Lisbon	Singles
Silver medal – second place	2016 Doha	Singles
Bronze medal – third place	2013 Dubai	Singles
Military World Games
Gold medal – first place	2019 Wuhan	Team
Gold medal – first place	2019 Wuhan	Singles
Gold medal – first place	2019 Wuhan	Doubles
Gold medal – first place	2019 Wuhan	Mixed doubles
Asian Games
Gold medal – first place	2014 Incheon	Team
Gold medal – first place	2018 Jakarta-Palembang	Singles
Gold medal – first place	2018 Jakarta-Palembang	Team
Gold medal – first place	2022 Hangzhou	Doubles
Gold medal – first place	2022 Hangzhou	Team
Silver medal – second place	2014 Incheon	Singles
Silver medal – second place	2014 Incheon	Doubles
Silver medal – second place	2022 Hangzhou	Singles
Asian Championships
Gold medal – first place	2013 Busan	Team
Gold medal – first place	2015 Pattaya	Team
Gold medal – first place	2015 Pattaya	Singles
Gold medal – first place	2015 Pattaya	Doubles
Gold medal – first place	2015 Pattaya	Mixed doubles
Gold medal – first place	2017 Wuxi	Team
Gold medal – first place	2017 Wuxi	Singles
Gold medal – first place	2017 Wuxi	Doubles
Gold medal – first place	2019 Yogyakarta	Team
Gold medal – first place	2023 Pyeongchang	Doubles
Gold medal – first place	2023 Pyeongchang	Team
Silver medal – second place	2019 Yogyakarta	Doubles
Silver medal – second place	2023 Pyeongchang	Singles
Bronze medal – third place	2013 Busan	Mixed doubles
Bronze medal – third place	2019 Yogyakarta	Singles
Asian Cup
Gold medal – first place	2018 Yokohama	Singles
Gold medal – first place	2019 Yokohama	Singles
Silver medal – second place	2014 Wuhan	Singles
Silver medal – second place	2015 Jaipur	Singles
Silver medal – second place	2017 Ahmedabad	Singles
East Asian Games
Gold medal – first place	2013 Tianjin	Singles
Gold medal – first place	2013 Tianjin	Team
Silver medal – second place	2013 Tianjin	Doubles
Youth Olympic Games
Gold medal – first place	2014 Nanjing	Singles
Gold medal – first place	2014 Nanjing	Mixed team
World Junior Championships
Gold medal – first place	2012 Hyderabad	Singles
Gold medal – first place	2012 Hyderabad	Mixed doubles
Gold medal – first place	2012 Hyderabad	Team
Silver medal – second place	2012 Hyderabad	Doubles
Asian Youth Games
Gold medal – first place	2013 Nanjing	Singles
Asian Junior Championships
Gold medal – first place	2012 Jiangyin	Singles
Gold medal – first place	2012 Jiangyin	Doubles
Gold medal – first place	2012 Jiangyin	Team

Fan Zhendong (Chinese: 樊振东; pinyin: Fán Zhèndōng, pronounced [fǎn ʈʂə̂ntʊ́ŋ]; born 22 January 1997 in Guangzhou, Guangdong Province, China) is a Chinese professional table tennis player. He is the reigning Olympic gold medallist in men's singles, with his victory at the 2024 Summer Olympics in Paris making him the 6th male player (and 11th player overall) to achieve a Grand Slam. He is also a two-time World Champion and four-time World Cup champion in men's singles.

Fan Zhendong was the youngest ITTF World Tour Champion, a record that was later surpassed by Tomokazu Harimoto. His attacking style of play involves explosive footwork and powerful loops on both forehand and backhand wings. His thick-set build has led fans and commentators to refer to him as "Little Fatty" (Chinese: 小胖; pinyin: Xiǎo Pàng).

Fan is studying at Shanghai Jiao Tong University.

== Early life ==
Fan Zhendong was born in Guangzhou, China on 22 February 1997. His father, a native of Qidong County, Hunan, was a graduate of the South China University of Technology and settled in Guangzhou, along with his wife, where he worked for a state-owned enterprise in the city. At the age of five, Fan enrolled in a table tennis training class at the Haizhu District Children's Palace, where he trained under coaches Yang Biyu and Wen Haoguang. While attending Tongfu Middle Road No. 1 Primary School in Haizhu District, he joined the school's table tennis team with the support of his parents and qualified for a tuition fee reduction.

In 2004, he represented the Haizhu District Children's Palace at the "Xinmiao Cup" Youth Table Tennis Tournament, where he won first place in the boys' Group A division. In 2006, he was selected to join Weilun Sports School (now Guangzhou Sports Polytechnic). In 2008, at the age of 11, Fan represented Guangzhou in provincial-level competitions in Guangdong, winning both the team and doubles championships. The same year, he was selected by the People's Liberation Army sports team and finished sixth in an internal round-robin tournament.

== Career ==
=== 2011 ===
In the 2011 National Table Tennis Championships, Fan Zhendong participated in the men's singles competition for the first time, but was defeated by Lai Jiaxin and stopped in the first round. At the end of the same year, he participated in the training camp of the national second team and provincial and municipal teams, and won first place in the round-robin competition.

=== 2012 ===
In February 2012, Fan joined the national table tennis team. In the same year, at the national table tennis championships, he lost to Fang Bo 3-4 in the third round of the men's singles competition. In July 2012, Fan won the Asian Youth Table Tennis Championships in three events: men's team, men's singles and mixed doubles. In November 2012, he participated in the National Youth Table Tennis Championships of the People's Republic of China and won the gold medal in the men's team event; in the men's singles event, he lost 3:4 and won the runner-up.

In December 2012, Fan participated in the World Youth Table Tennis Championships and won the men's team, men's singles and mixed doubles championships, and also won the men's doubles runner-up.

=== 2013 ===
On 3 January 2013, the Chinese table tennis team competed in Paris for the first time.

In the first stage of the competition, Fan, who was only 16 years old, defeated many famous players and unexpectedly won second place. In the second stage he achieved eighth place.

=== 2014 ===
On 22 March, in the men's singles final of the Asian Cup Table Tennis Tournament, he lost to Ma Long and placed runner-up.

On 5 May, the 52nd Team World Table Tennis Championships kicked off the men's team finals in Tokyo, Japan. China won with a final score of 3-1, Fan Zhendong became the world champion.

=== 2015 ===
In January, he won the Dubai World Cup men's team championship with Zhang Jike, Ma Long, Xu Xin and Fang Bo. On 28 July 2015, in the 13th round of the Table Tennis Super League men's competition, 18-year-old Fan Zhendong of the Bayi Team won another victory this round. So far, his personal winning rate is still 100%. Winning 24 games, Fan Zhendong broke the Super League record of 23 games won by Ma Long in 2012.

=== 2016 ===
In June, Fan Zhendong won the men's singles championship at the ITTF World Tour Japan Open. It is worth mentioning that in the quarter-finals with French player Simon Gauzy, Fan Zhendong hit a "magic save". This "magic save" not only made Fan Zhendong's popularity soar, but also won the ITTF Star Awards title of "Star Point of the Year".

=== 2017 ===
On 8 March, in the final round of the World Table Tennis Championships in Düsseldorf held in Shenzhen, Fan Zhendong defeated Xu Xin 2-0, ranking first with 9 wins and 2 losses, and won the first Düsseldorf title. On 12 April, he won the men's team championship at the Asian Table Tennis Championships.

=== 2018 ===
In the early morning of 22 January 2018, the Hungarian Open, the first ITTF tournament in 2018, decided on four championships, all of which were won by China Table Tennis Federation. Fan Zhendong defeated another Chinese player Wang Chuqin 4-1 in the men's singles final and won the championship.

=== 2019 ===
On 3 March 2019, Fan Zhendong won all 11 matches in the 2019 Direct Tournament and received the qualification for singles participation as the first seed in the 2019 World Table Tennis Championships, held in Budapest. Fan was knocked out in the fourth round by compatriot Liang Jingkun.

=== 2020 ===
On 15 November 2020, he defeated Ma Long 4-3 in the men's singles final of the 2020 Men's Table Tennis World Cup and won the championship for the fourth time. On 22 November, in the men's singles final of the 2020 ITTF Finals, Fan Zhendong lost to Ma Long 1-4 and won the runner-up.

=== 2021 ===
Fan Zhendong after winning the 2024 World Team Table Tennis Championships in Busan, China News Service.

In May, Fan played in the Chinese Olympic Scrimmages. He won all his group matches 3–0 and defeated 16-year-old break-out star Lin Shidong, who defeated Xu Xin in the group stage, 4–2 in the quarter-finals. Because of Lin's similarity to Fan, he received the nickname "Little Little Fatty" by Chinese netizens. Fan defeated Wang Chuqin in the semi-finals, but lost to the dark horse champion Zhou Qihao in the finals. Fan was selected alongside Ma Long to represent China in the men's singles event at the Tokyo Olympics. Fan won the second leg of the Chinese Olympic Scrimmage, coming back from down 8–4 and 3–1 in games to defeat Xu Xin in the finals. Fan noted that his selection onto the Olympic team helped him focus better on his training and play better in the second leg compared to the first leg. Zhou again upset Fan in a closed-door scrimmage in June.

Although Ma Long called Fan the favorite before their Olympic finals match-up, Ma ended up upsetting Fan 4-2 in the Olympic finals, giving Ma the gold medal and Fan the silver. Despite the loss, Fan Zhendong still showed class, acknowledging Ma Long's control of the match and recognizing his own missed opportunities. When asked about Ma Long's place in history, Fan acknowledged that he is the greatest in their generation.

In September, Fan saved six match points to beat Ma Long in the fifth in the finals of the team event at the China National Games. Fan's win over Ma delivered Team Guangdong the gold medal. Fan Zhendong also won the gold in the men's singles event.

=== 2023 ===
Fan won five titles in 2023, including double gold at both the Singapore Smash and the 2023 World Table Tennis Championships, where he won the men's singles and doubles competition in both events. Fan won the ITTF "Male Player of the Year" award later that year, with an impressive 81% singles winning rate and reaching seven finals.

=== 2024 ===
Fan Zhendong helped the Chinese men's team secure their 11th consecutive World Team Championship title in 2024. He went undefeated in all 8 matches he played during the tournament, including two crucial wins in the 3–2 semifinal victory over South Korea and one win in the final against France.

Fan defeated Sweden's Truls Möregårdh 4–1 to win his first individual Olympic gold medal at Paris 2024 on Sunday, 4 August. His victory marked Fan's completion of a career Grand Slam, having now secured singles titles at the World Championships, World Cup, and Olympics. He becomes the sixth man to achieve this feat after Jan-Ove Waldner, Liu Guoliang, Kong Linghui, Zhang Jike, and Ma Long. On 9 August, in the men's team event, Fan helped China win the gold medal with a 3–0 (3–2, 3–2, 3–2) victory over Sweden in the final.

In December 2024, Fan Zhendong formally signed a notification declaring retirement from all events sanctioned by the International Table Tennis Federation (ITTF) and announced his withdrawal from the world rankings.

=== 2025 ===
In November, Fan Zhendong won the 2025 National Games of China men's singles gold medal with a 4-1 over Lin Shidong in the finals, and a silver medal in the men's team event for Team Shanghai with a 1-3 loss against Team Beijing in the finals.

=== 2026 ===
In January, Fan won his first title in Germany when 1. FC Saarbrücken won the German Cup, defeating TTC RhönSprudel Fulda-Maberzell 3–1 in the final. Fan contributed two singles victories, defeating Dimitrij Ovtcharov and Ruwen Filus.

In March, Borussia Düsseldorf announced that Fan would join the club for the 2026–27 season on a one-year contract, with the transfer taking effect on 1 July.

In May, Saarbrücken won the 2025-26 ETTU Champions League, defeating Alliance Nîmes/Montpellier 3-2 in the final. Later that month, the club won the Bundesliga title with a 3–1 victory over Borussia Düsseldorf, with Fan contributing two victories in the final against his then-future team.

In June, Fan was named the Table Tennis Bundesliga Player of the Season for 2025-26, receiving 94% of the vote after recording 20 victories in 23 league matches.

== Playing style and equipment ==
Fan Zhendong voice.

A right-handed shakehand-grip player, Fan is known for an attacking style of play that focuses on his explosive footwork and powerful topspin shots to finish off his opponents. After emerging as a 16-year-old wunderkind, his style is often compared to fellow Chinese player and senior compatriot Ma Long. In addition to training with the Chinese national team coaches, he also trained with former world champions Wang Hao and Ma Lin. His matches against senior players in the Chinese national team have attracted significant attention, and he achieved victories against highly rated, experienced players from early in his career.

Fan raises his elbow higher on his strokes compared to some of his contemporaries such as Ma Long and Xu Xin, resulting in a stronger backhand-forehand transition game at the expense of a more vulnerable middle. In 2021, Timo Boll stated that he felt that he and Fan played a similar style except that Fan was better. Boll did not elaborate further.

Fan was a Stiga sponsored athlete. However, he changed to Butterfly Fan Zhendong ALC, he uses a black DHS Hurricane 3 neo National Blue Sponge for forehand and a Red Tenergy 05 for backhand. During the 2019 world table tennis championships, he changed to the new Butterfly Dignics 05 on his backhand that had just been released on 1 April 2019. Butterfly announced its signing of Fan Zhendong on 1 November 2021.

== Achievements ==
=== Performance timeline ===
Key
W	F	SF	QF	#R

(W) won; (F) finalist; (SF) semi-finalist; (QF) quarter-finalist; (#R) rounds 4, 3, 2, 1
(S) singles event; (MD) men's doubles event; (XD) mixed doubles event; (T) team event

Tournament		2013	2014	2015	2016	2017	2018	2019	2020	2021	2022	2023	2024
World Championships	S	3R		SF		F		4R		W		W	
World Championships	MD			F		W				QF		W	
World Championships	XD							SF					
World Championships	T		W		W		W				W		W
Olympic Games	S									F			W
Olympic Games	T									W			W
World Cup	S			F	W		W	W	W				QF
World Cup	T			W			W	W				W	
ITTF Finals / WTT Finals	S	SF		F	F	W	QF	W	F	W	QF	F	
ITTF Finals / WTT Finals	MD							W				SF	
Asian Games	S		F				W					F	
Asian Games	MD		F									W	
Asian Games	T		W				W					W	
Asian Championships	S	QF		W		W		SF				F	
Asian Championships	MD			W		W		F				W	
Asian Championships	XD	SF		W									
Asian Championships	T	W		W		W		W				W	
Asian Cup	S		F	F		F	W	W					
Year-end ranking		2013	2014	2015	2016	2017	2018	2019	2020	2021	2022	2023	2024
Year-end ranking		5	3	2	2	2	1	2	1	1	1	1	6

=== Finals ===
==== Men's singles ====
Result	Year	Tournament	Opponent	Score	Ref
Winner	2013	East Asian Games	(China) Yan An	3–0	
Winner	2013	ITTF World Tour, Polish Open	(China) Zhou Yu	4–2	
Winner	2013	ITTF World Tour, German Open	(Germany) Dimitrij Ovtcharov	4–1	
Runner-up	2013	ITTF World Tour, Swedish Open	(China) Yan An	2–4	
Winner	2014	ITTF World Tour, Kuwait Open	(China) Yan An	4–1	
Runner-up	2014	Asian Cup	(China) Ma Long	3–4	
Runner-up	2014	Asian Games	(China) Xu Xin	2–4	
Winner	2014	ITTF World Tour, Swedish Open	(China) Fang Bo	4–2	
Runner-up	2015	Asian Cup	(China) Xu Xin	3–4	
Winner	2015	Asian Championships	(China) Xu Xin	4–3	
Runner-up	2015	World Cup	(China) Ma Long	0–4	
Winner	2015	ITTF World Tour, Polish Open	(Austria) Stefan Fegerl	4–3	
Winner	2015	ITTF World Tour, Swedish Open	(China) Xu Xin	4–2	
Runner-up	2015	ITTF World Tour Grand Finals	(China) Ma Long	3–4	
Runner-up	2016	ITTF World Tour, Qatar Open	(China) Ma Long	1–4	
Runner-up	2016	ITTF Asian Olympic Qualification Tournament	(China) Ma Long	1–4	
Winner	2016	ITTF World Tour, Japan Open	(China) Xu Xin	4–1	
Winner	2016	ITTF World Tour, China Open	(China) Ma Long	4–0	
Winner	2016	World Cup	(China) Xu Xin	4–1	
Runner-up	2016	ITTF World Tour Grand Finals	(China) Ma Long	2–4	
Runner-up	2017	ITTF World Tour, Qatar Open	(China) Ma Long	2–4	
Winner	2017	Asian Championships	(South Korea) Jeong Sang-eun	3–0	
Runner-up	2017	World Championships	(China) Ma Long	3–4	
Runner-up	2017	ITTF World Tour, Japan Open	(China) Ma Long	1–4	
Runner-up	2017	Asian Cup	(China) Lin Gaoyuan	2–4	
Runner-up	2017	ITTF World Tour, Swedish Open	(China) Xu Xin	1–4	
Winner	2017	ITTF World Tour Grand Finals	(Germany) Dimitrij Ovtcharov	4–0	
Winner	2018	ITTF World Tour, Hungarian Open	(China) Wang Chuqin	4–1	
Winner	2018	ITTF World Tour, Qatar Open	(Brazil) Hugo Calderano	4–0	
Winner	2018	Asian Cup	(China) Lin Gaoyuan	4–0	
Runner-up	2018	ITTF World Tour, China Open	(China) Ma Long	1–4	
Winner	2018	Asian Games	(China) Lin Gaoyuan	4–2	
Winner	2018	World Cup	(Germany) Timo Boll	4–1	
Winner	2018	ITTF World Tour, Swedish Open	(China) Xu Xin	4–1	
Winner	2019	Asian Cup	(China) Ma Long	4–2	
Runner-up	2019	T2 Diamond Malaysia	(Chinese Taipei) Lin Yun-ju	1–4	
Winner	2019	ITTF World Tour Platinum, German Open	(China) Xu Xin	4–1	
Winner	2019	ITTF World Tour Platinum, Austrian Open	(China) Zhao Zihao	4–0	
Winner	2019	World Cup	(Japan) Tomokazu Harimoto	4–2	
Winner	2019	ITTF World Tour Grand Finals	(China) Ma Long	4–1	
Winner	2020	ITTF World Tour Platinum, Qatar Open	(England) Liam Pitchford	4–2	
Winner	2020	World Cup	(China) Ma Long	4–3	
Runner-up	2020	ITTF Finals	(China) Ma Long	1–4	
Runner-up	2021	Olympic Games	(China) Ma Long	2–4	
Winner	2021	World Championships	(Sweden) Truls Möregårdh	4–0	
Winner	2021	WTT Cup Finals	(Japan) Tomokazu Harimoto	4–1	
Winner	2022	WTT Singapore Smash	(China) Ma Long	4–3	
Runner-up	2022	WTT Champions Macao	(China) Wang Chuqin	3–4	
Winner	2023	WTT Singapore Smash	(China) Ma Long	4–1	
Winner	2023	WTT Champions Xinxiang	(China) Liang Jingkun	4–1	
Winner	2023	World Championships	(China) Wang Chuqin	4–2	
Runner-up	2023	WTT Contender Zagreb	(China) Lin Gaoyuan	3–4	
Winner	2023	WTT Star Contender Ljubljana	(China) Wang Chuqin	4–3	
Runner-up	2023	Asian Championships	(China) Ma Long	2–3	
Runner-up	2023	Asian Games	(China) Wang Chuqin	3–4	
Runner-up	2024	WTT Finals	(China) Wang Chuqin	0–4	
Winner	2024	WTT Champions Chongqing	(China) Wang Chuqin	4–3	
Winner	2024	Olympic Games	(Sweden) Truls Möregårdh	4–1	

==== Men's doubles ====
Result	Year	Tournament	Partner	Opponents	Score	Ref
Winner	2014	ITTF World Tour, China Open	Ma Long	(China) Xu Xin / Zhang Jike	3–2	
Runner-up	2014	Asian Games	Xu Xin	(China) Ma Long / Zhang Jike	0–4	
Runner-up	2014	ITTF World Tour, Swedish Open	Xu Xin	(China) Wang Hao / Yan An	2–3	
Runner-up	2015	World Championships	Zhou Yu	(China) Xu Xin / Zhang Jike	2–4	
Runner-up	2015	ITTF World Tour, Japan Open	Shang Kun	(China) Ma Long / Xu Xin	2–3	
Winner	2015	ITTF World Tour, China Open	Xu Xin	(China) Fang Bo / Zhu Linfeng	3–2	
Winner	2015	Asian Championships	Xu Xin	(South Korea) Jeoung Young-sik / Lee Sang-su	4–0	
Runner-up	2015	ITTF World Tour, Swedish Open	Zhang Jike	(China) Fang Bo / Xu Xin	1–3	
Winner	2016	ITTF World Tour, Qatar Open	Zhang Jike	(Japan) Koki Niwa / Maharu Yoshimura	3–0	
Runner-up	2016	ITTF World Tour, China Open	Xu Xin	(China) Ma Long / Zhang Jike	2–3	
Winner	2017	Asian Championships	Lin Gaoyuan	(China) Fang Bo / Zhou Yu	3–1	
Winner	2017	World Championships	Xu Xin	(Japan) Masataka Morizono / Yuya Oshima	4–1	
Winner	2017	ITTF World Tour, Swedish Open	Xu Xin	(Hong Kong) Ho Kwan-kit / Wong Chun-ting	3–1	
Winner	2018	ITTF World Tour, Hungarian Open	Yu Ziyang	(Belarus) Pavel Platonov / Vladimir Samsonov	3–0	
Winner	2018	ITTF World Tour, Qatar Open	Xu Xin	(Japan) Jun Mizutani / Yuya Oshima	3–1	
Winner	2018	ITTF World Tour, China Open	Lin Gaoyuan	(Romania) Ovidiu Ionescu / (Spain) Álvaro Robles	3–0	
Runner-up	2019	ITTF World Tour, Hungarian Open	Lin Gaoyuan	(China) Liang Jingkun / Xu Xin	2–3	
Winner	2019	ITTF World Tour Platinum, Japan Open	Xu Xin	(Germany) Benedikt Duda / Dang Qiu	3–0	
Winner	2019	ITTF World Tour, Korea Open	Xu Xin	(South Korea) Jeoung Young-sik / Lee Sang-su	3–0	
Runner-up	2019	Asian Championships	Xu Xin	(China) Liang Jingkun / Lin Gaoyuan	1–3	
Winner	2019	ITTF World Tour, Swedish Open	Xu Xin	(China) Liang Jingkun / Lin Gaoyuan	3–2	
Winner	2019	ITTF World Tour Grand Finals	Xu Xin	(Chinese Taipei) Liao Cheng-ting / Lin Yun-ju	3–1	
Winner	2022	WTT Singapore Smash	Wang Chuqin	(Japan) Yukiya Uda / Shunsuke Togami	3–1	
Winner	2023	WTT Singapore Smash	Wang Chuqin	(South Korea) Jang Woo-jin / Lim Jong-hoon	3–1	
Winner	2023	World Championships	Wang Chuqin	(South Korea) Jang Woo-jin / Lim Jong-hoon	3–0	
Winner	2023	Asian Championships	Lin Gaoyuan	(China) Ma Long / Wang Chuqin	3–2	
Winner	2023	Asian Games	Wang Chuqin	(South Korea) Jang Woo-jin / Lim Jong-hoon	4–0	
Runner-up	2024	WTT Singapore Smash	Wang Chuqin	(China) Lin Gaoyuan / Ma Long	2–3	

==== Mixed doubles ====
Result	Year	Tournament	Partner	Opponents	Score	Ref
Winner	2015	Asian Championships	Chen Meng	(Singapore) Yang Zi / Yu Mengyu	4–0	

=== Awards ===
In 2016, Fan won the ITTF Star Point Award, and he was nominated for the Best Male Star Award every year between 2013 and 2016.

In 2025, Fan won the Big Ben Award.

== See also ==
- List of Youth Olympic Games gold medalists who won Olympic gold medals
