= 2015 Asian Table Tennis Championships =

- Date: 26 September – 3 October 2015
- Edition: 22nd
- Location: Pattaya, Thailand
- Venue: Eastern National Sports Training Center

Champions

Men's singles
- (China) Fan Zhendong

Women's singles
- (China) Zhu Yuling

Men's doubles
- (China) Fan Zhendong / (China) Xu Xin

Women's doubles
- (North Korea) Kim Hye-song / (North Korea) Ri Mi-gyong

Mixed doubles
- (China) Fan Zhendong / (China) Chen Meng

Men's team
- China

Women's team
- China
← 2013 ·	Asian Table Tennis Championships	· 2017 →

The Suzuki 2015 ITTF-Asian Table Tennis Championships were held in Pattaya, Thailand, from 26 September to 3 October 2015.

== Medal summary ==
=== Medal table ===
Rank	Nation	Gold	Silver	Bronze	Total
1	China	6	2	2	10
2	North Korea	1	0	1	2
3	Japan	0	3	3	6
4	South Korea	0	1	2	3
5	Singapore	0	1	1	2
6	Hong Kong	0	0	3	3
7	Chinese Taipei	0	0	2	2
Totals (7 entries)		7	7	14	28

=== Events ===
Event	Gold	Silver	Bronze
Men's singles	(China) Fan Zhendong	(China) Xu Xin	(Chinese Taipei) Chuang Chih-yuan
Men's singles	(China) Fan Zhendong	(China) Xu Xin	(Hong Kong) Wong Chun Ting
Women's singles	(China) Zhu Yuling	(China) Chen Meng	(China) Mu Zi
Women's singles	(China) Zhu Yuling	(China) Chen Meng	(Singapore) Feng Tianwei
Men's doubles	(China) Fan Zhendong (China) Xu Xin	(South Korea) Lee Sang-su (South Korea) Jeoung Young-sik	(Japan) Masataka Morizono (Japan) Yuya Oshima
Men's doubles	(China) Fan Zhendong (China) Xu Xin	(South Korea) Lee Sang-su (South Korea) Jeoung Young-sik	(Japan) Koki Niwa (Japan) Maharu Yoshimura
Women's doubles	(North Korea) Kim Hye-song (North Korea) Ri Mi-gyong	(Japan) Miu Hirano (Japan) Mima Ito	(China) Chen Meng (China) Zhu Yuling
Women's doubles	(North Korea) Kim Hye-song (North Korea) Ri Mi-gyong	(Japan) Miu Hirano (Japan) Mima Ito	(Hong Kong) Jiang Huajun (Hong Kong) Tie Yana
Mixed doubles	(China) Fan Zhendong (China) Chen Meng	(Singapore) Yang Zi (Singapore) Yu Mengyu	(Japan) Yuya Oshima (Japan) Misako Wakamiya
Mixed doubles	(China) Fan Zhendong (China) Chen Meng	(Singapore) Yang Zi (Singapore) Yu Mengyu	(North Korea) Choe il (North Korea) Ri Mi-gyong
Men's team	China; Ma Long; Xu Xin; Fan Zhendong; Zhang Jike; Fang Bo	Japan; Maharu Yoshimura; Koki Niwa; Yuya Oshima; Masataka Morizono; Yuto Muramatsu	Chinese Taipei; Chiang Hung-chieh; Liao Cheng-ting; Wang Li Chung-yi; Chuang Chih-yuan; Lee Chia-sheng
Men's team	China; Ma Long; Xu Xin; Fan Zhendong; Zhang Jike; Fang Bo	Japan; Maharu Yoshimura; Koki Niwa; Yuya Oshima; Masataka Morizono; Yuto Muramatsu	South Korea; Joo Sae-hyuk; Lee Sang-su; Jeoung Young-sik; Jang Woo-jin; Kim Min-hyeok
Women's team	China; Ding Ning; Liu Shiwen; Zhu Yuling; Chen Meng; Mu Zi	Japan; Ai Fukuhara; Mima Ito; Miu Hirano; Misako Wakamiya; Saki Tashiro	Hong Kong; Jiang Huajun; Tie Yana; Doo Hoi Kem; Li Ching Wan; Mak Tze Wing
Women's team	China; Ding Ning; Liu Shiwen; Zhu Yuling; Chen Meng; Mu Zi	Japan; Ai Fukuhara; Mima Ito; Miu Hirano; Misako Wakamiya; Saki Tashiro	South Korea; Yang Ha-eun; Suh Hyo-won; Lee Zi-on; Yoo Eun-chong; Song Ma-eum

== See also ==
- 2015 Asian Cup Table Tennis Tournament
