= Jeong Sang-eun =

Chinese-South Korean table tennis player

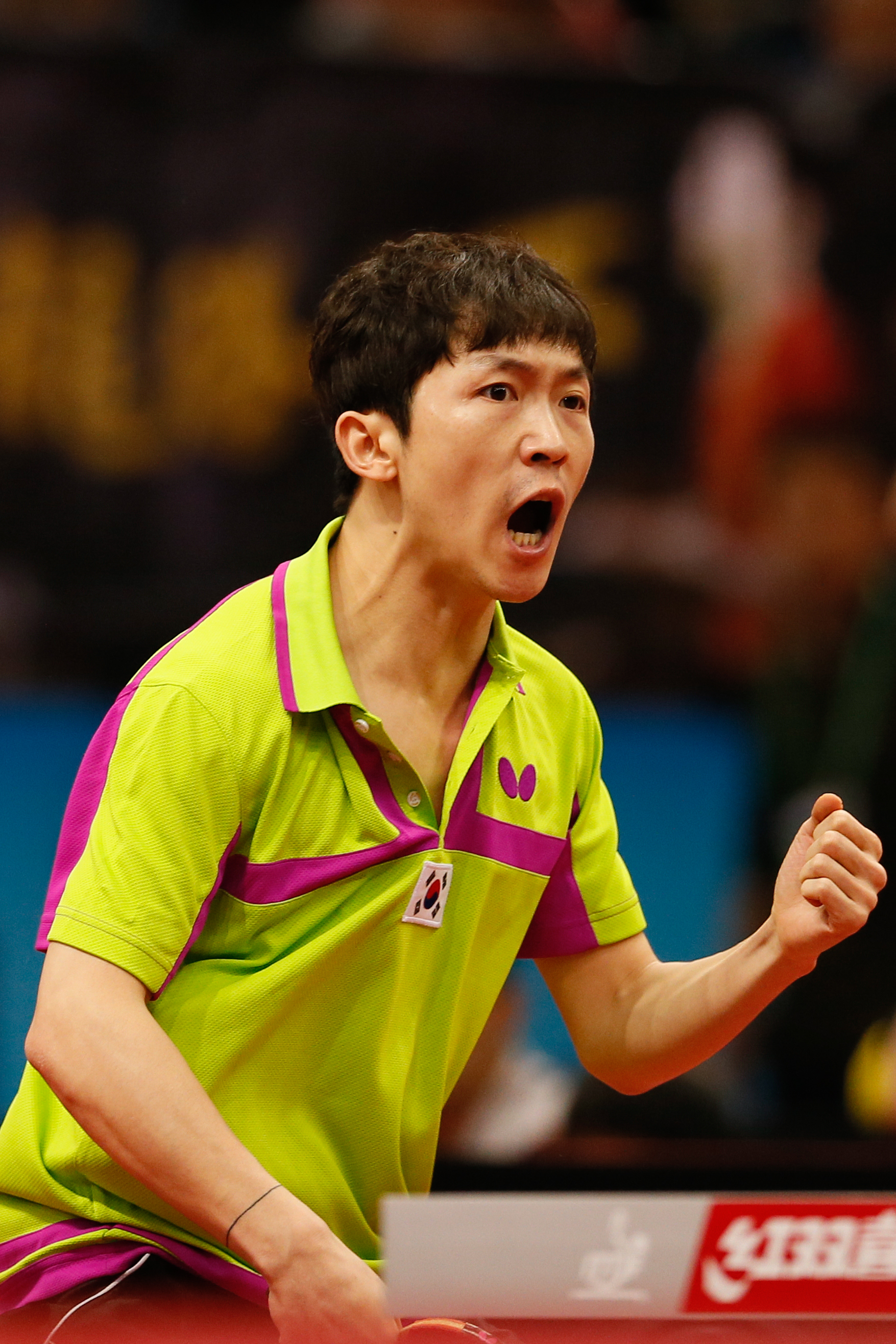
- Jeong at the 2017 Asian Table Tennis Championships

Personal information
- Nationality: Chinese (before 2005); South Korean (after 2005)
- Born: Ding Xiang'en; 2 April 1990 (age 36) Wangqing County, Jilin, China
- Height: 168 cm (5 ft 6 in)
- Weight: 60 kg (132 lb)

Sport
- Sport: Table tennis
- Playing style: Right-handed shakehand grip
- Highest ranking: 15 (August 2018)
Medal record
Representing South Korea
World Championships
Bronze medal – third place	2016 Shah Alam	Men's team
Asian Games
Silver medal – second place	2014 Incheon	Men's team
Asian Championships
Silver medal – second place	2017 Wuxi	Men's singles
Silver medal – second place	2017 Wuxi	Men's team
East Asian Games
Bronze medal – third place	2009 Hong Kong	Men's team

Jeong Sang-eun

Chinese name
- Chinese: 丁祥恩
Transcriptions
Standard Mandarin
- Hanyu Pinyin: Dīng Xiáng'ēn

Korean name
- Hangul: 정상은

Jeong Sang-eun (Korean: 정상은; Hanja: 丁祥恩, born 2 April 1990) is a Chinese-South Korean table tennis player. An ethnic Korean born in China, he became a naturalized South Korean in 2005.

== Achievements ==
=== Major events ===
Men's singles

Year	Tournament	Final opponent	Score	Rank
2017	Asian Table Tennis Championships	Fan Zhendong	0–3	2nd place, silver medalist(s)

=== ITTF Tours ===
Men's singles

Year	Tournament	Level	Final opponent	Score	Rank
2012	Czech Open	World Tour	Christian Süß	1–4	2nd place, silver medalist(s)
2015	Hungarian Open	World Tour	Jiang Tianyi	3–4	2nd place, silver medalist(s)

Men's doubles

Year	Tournament	Level	Partner	Final opponents	Score	Rank
2015	Hungarian Open	World Tour	Lee Sang-su	Viacheslav Burov; Alexey Liventsov	3–1	1st place, gold medalist(s)
2017	Korea Open	World Tour	Jang Woo-jin	Patrick Franziska; Jonathan Groth	3–2	1st place, gold medalist(s)
