= Table tennis at the 2014 Asian Games =

- Venue: Suwon Gymnasium
- Dates: 27 September – 4 October 2014
- Competitors: 169 from 25 nations

Table tennis at the 2014 Asian Games was held in Suwon, South Korea from September 27–October 4, 2014. Two team events and five individual events were held at Suwon Gymnasium after the preliminary round of women's handball finished on September 25.

Singles, Doubles, and Team events were held at Suwon Gymnasium. China dominated the competition winning six of seven gold medals.

== Schedule ==
P	Preliminary rounds	¼	Quarterfinals	½	Semifinals	F	Final

Event↓/Date →	27th Sat	28th Sun		29th Mon	30th Tue	1st Wed	2nd Thu		3rd Fri		4th Sat	
Men's singles				P		P	P	¼			½	F
Men's doubles				P	P	P	¼		½	F		
Men's team	P	P	¼	½	F							
Women's singles				P		P	P	¼			½	F
Women's doubles				P		P	¼		½	F		
Women's team	P	P	¼	½	F							
Mixed doubles				P	P	¼	½		F			

== Medalists ==
Event	Gold	Silver	Bronze
Men's singles	Xu Xin; China	Fan Zhendong; China	Joo Sae-hyuk; South Korea
Men's singles	Xu Xin; China	Fan Zhendong; China	Chuang Chih-yuan; Chinese Taipei
Men's doubles	China; Ma Long; Zhang Jike	China; Xu Xin; Fan Zhendong	Singapore; Gao Ning; Li Hu
Men's doubles	China; Ma Long; Zhang Jike	China; Xu Xin; Fan Zhendong	Japan; Koki Niwa; Kenta Matsudaira
Men's team	China; Fan Zhendong; Ma Long; Xu Xin; Zhang Jike; Zhou Yu	South Korea; Jeong Sang-eun; Joo Sae-hyuk; Kim Dong-hyun; Kim Min-seok; Lee Jung-woo	Japan; Seiya Kishikawa; Kenta Matsudaira; Jun Mizutani; Yuto Muramatsu; Koki Niwa
Men's team	China; Fan Zhendong; Ma Long; Xu Xin; Zhang Jike; Zhou Yu	South Korea; Jeong Sang-eun; Joo Sae-hyuk; Kim Dong-hyun; Kim Min-seok; Lee Jung-woo	Chinese Taipei; Chen Chien-an; Chiang Hung-chieh; Chuang Chih-yuan; Huang Sheng-sheng; Wu Chih-chi
Women's singles	Liu Shiwen; China	Zhu Yuling; China	Yang Ha-eun; South Korea
Women's singles	Liu Shiwen; China	Zhu Yuling; China	Feng Tianwei; Singapore
Women's doubles	China; Zhu Yuling; Chen Meng	China; Liu Shiwen; Wu Yang	North Korea; Kim Jong; Kim Hye-song
Women's doubles	China; Zhu Yuling; Chen Meng	China; Liu Shiwen; Wu Yang	Hong Kong; Lee Ho Ching; Ng Wing Nam
Women's team	China; Chen Meng; Ding Ning; Liu Shiwen; Wu Yang; Zhu Yuling	Japan; Ai Fukuhara; Miu Hirano; Sayaka Hirano; Kasumi Ishikawa; Misako Wakamiya	North Korea; Kim Hye-song; Kim Jong; Kim Song-i; Ri Mi-gyong; Ri Myong-sun
Women's team	China; Chen Meng; Ding Ning; Liu Shiwen; Wu Yang; Zhu Yuling	Japan; Ai Fukuhara; Miu Hirano; Sayaka Hirano; Kasumi Ishikawa; Misako Wakamiya	Singapore; Feng Tianwei; Isabelle Li; Lin Ye; Yu Mengyu; Zhou Yihan
Mixed doubles	North Korea; Kim Hyok-bong; Kim Jong	Hong Kong; Jiang Tianyi; Lee Ho Ching	South Korea; Kim Min-seok; Jeon Ji-hee
Mixed doubles	North Korea; Kim Hyok-bong; Kim Jong	Hong Kong; Jiang Tianyi; Lee Ho Ching	Japan; Seiya Kishikawa; Ai Fukuhara

== Medal table ==
Rank	Nation	Gold	Silver	Bronze	Total
1	China (CHN)	6	4	0	10
2	North Korea (PRK)	1	0	2	3
3	Japan (JPN)	0	1	3	4
3	South Korea (KOR)	0	1	3	4
5	Hong Kong (HKG)	0	1	1	2
6	Singapore (SIN)	0	0	3	3
7	Chinese Taipei (TPE)	0	0	2	2
Totals (7 entries)		7	7	14	28

== Participating nations ==
A total of 169 athletes from 25 nations competed in table tennis at the 2014 Asian Games:

- Bahrain (2)
- China (10)
- Chinese Taipei (10)
- Hong Kong (10)
- India (10)
- Iran (3)
- Japan (10)
- Kazakhstan (2)
- Kuwait (8)
- Laos (6)
- Lebanon (2)
- Macau (8)
- Malaysia (3)
- Maldives (8)
- Mongolia (8)
- Nepal (10)
- North Korea (10)
- Pakistan (6)
- Palestine (2)
- Qatar (8)
- Saudi Arabia (5)
- Singapore (10)
- South Korea (10)
- Thailand (4)
- Yemen (4)
