= Seo Hyun-deok =

South Korean table tennis player (born 1991)

Personal information
- Native name: 서현덕
- Nationality: South Korean
- Born: 9 May 1991 (age 35)

Sport
- Sport: Table tennis
- Playing style: Left-handed, shakehand grip
- Highest ranking: 25 (July 2011)
Medal record
Men's table tennis
Representing South Korea
World Championships
| Bronze medal – third place | 2015 Suzhou | Doubles |
Asian Championships
| Bronze medal – third place | 2013 Busan | Team |

Seo Hyun-deok (born 9 May 1991) is a South Korean male table tennis player. He belongs to Samsung Life Insurance. He won six doubles titles on the ITTF World Tour between 2010 and 2014, including the victory at the 2014 ITTF World Tour Grand Finals. In 2015, he won a bronze medal in men's doubles event with Lee Sang-su at the World Championships.
