= ITTF Star Awards =

The ITTF Star Awards are annual awards organized by the International Table Tennis Federation to recognize professional table tennis players and coaches. The awards were established in 2013.

== Awards ==
Year	Male Star	Female Star	Para Male Star	Para Female Star	Star Point	Star Coach	Breakthrough Star	Other awards
2013	(China) Zhang Jike	(China) Li Xiaoxia	(China) Ma Lin*	(Sweden) Anna-Carin Ahlquist	(Germany) Timo Boll	—	—	Fan's Stars: (China) Zhang Jike (China) Liu Shiwen
2014	(Nigeria) Quadri Aruna	(China) Ding Ning	(Spain) Álvaro Valera	(Croatia) Sandra Paović	(Nigeria) Quadri Aruna	(Austria) Liu Jia	—	Fair Play Star: (Portugal) Pedro Rufino
2015	(China) Ma Long	(China) Liu Shiwen	(Indonesia) David Jacobs	(Serbia) Borislava Perić	(China) Fang Bo	(China) Liu Guoliang	(Japan) Mima Ito	Fair Play Stars: (Kosovo) Linor Çitaku (Kosovo) Vlona Maloku
2016	(China) Ma Long	(China) Ding Ning	(Belgium) Laurens Devos	(China) Liu Jing	(China) Fan Zhendong	(China) Liu Guoliang	(Japan) Miu Hirano	Fair Play Star: (Egypt) Rinad Fathy
2017	(Germany) Timo Boll	(China) Ding Ning	(Ukraine) Viktor Didukh	(Turkey) Neslihan Kavas	(China) Ding Ning	(Germany) Jörg Roßkopf	(Japan) Tomokazu Harimoto	Fair Play Star: (France) Irvin Bertrand
2018	(China) Fan Zhendong	(China) Ding Ning	(Spain) Jordi Morales	(Netherlands) Kelly van Zon	(China) Xu Xin	(Italy) Massimo Costantini	(India) Manika Batra	MVP: (China) Fan Zhendong (Japan) Mima Ito
2019	(China) Ma Long	(China) Liu Shiwen	(Germany) Thomas Schmidberger	(Italy) Giada Rossi	(China) Xu Xin (China) Fan Zhendong	(Puerto Rico) Bladimir Díaz	(United States) Lily Zhang	Best Dressed: (China) Xu Xin
2023	(China) Fan Zhendong	(China) Sun Yingsha	(England) Will Bayley	(South Korea) Seo Su-yeon	—	(France) Nathanaël Molin	—	Match Official of the Year: (Germany) Kerstin Duchatz
"—" denotes the category did not exist that year. *Not to be confused with famous table tennis player Ma Lin, also of China.

== See also ==
- ITTF World Tour
