= Carlos Machado (table tennis) =

Spanish table tennis player

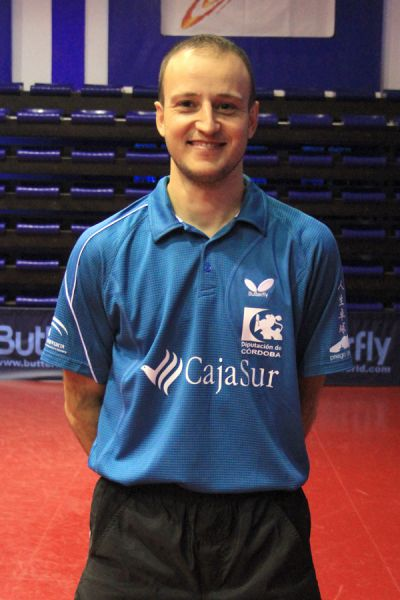
Carlos Machado with the equipment of CajaSur Priego.

Carlos Machado (born 18 June 1980 in Córdoba, Andalusia) is a Spanish table tennis player. He plays right-handed and his best rank is 57th. After appearing at the 2012 Summer Olympics, he and teammate He Zhi Wen won a bronze medal at the 2013 European Table Tennis Championships.
