= Kenta Matsudaira =

Japanese table tennis player (born 1991)

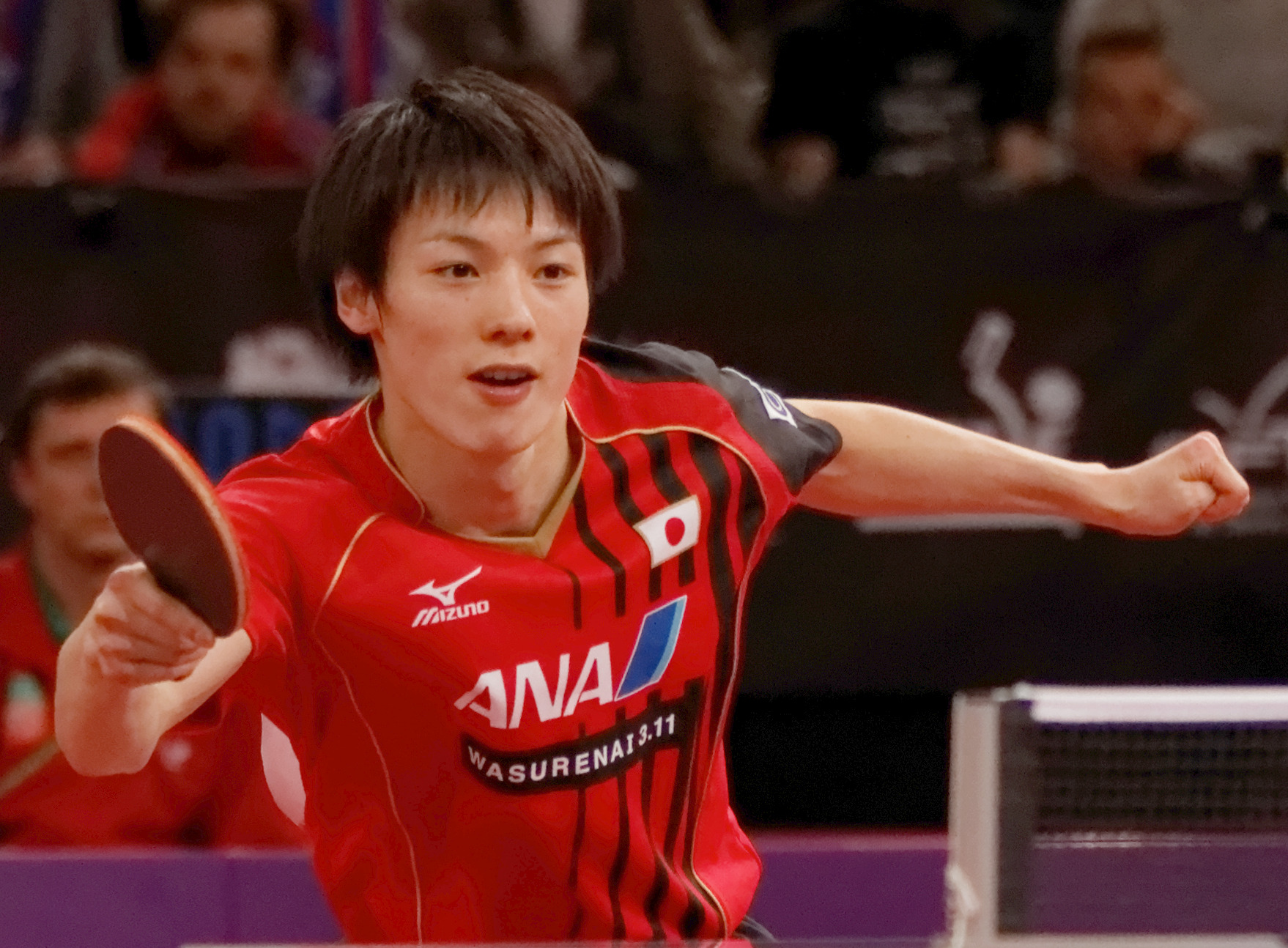
- Matsudaira at the 2013 World Championships

Personal information
- Nationality: Japan
- Born: 11 April 1991 (age 35) Nanao-shi, Ishikawa, Japan
- Height: 1.68 m (5 ft 6 in)
- Weight: 61 kg (134 lb; 9.6 st)

Sport
- Sport: Table tennis
- Club: T.T Saitama
- Playing style: Right-handed, shakehand grip
- Equipment: Matsudaira Kenta ALC, Tenergy 05 FH, Tenergy 05 BH
- Highest ranking: 9 (November 2017)
- Current ranking: 121 (April 2020)
Medal record
Representing Japan
World Championships
Silver medal – second place	2016 Kuala Lumpur	Team
Bronze medal – third place	2010 Moscow	Team
Bronze medal – third place	2014 Tokyo	Team
Bronze medal – third place	2015 Suzhou	Doubles
Asian Games
Bronze medal – third place	2010 Guangzhou	Doubles
Bronze medal – third place	2010 Guangzhou	Team
Bronze medal – third place	2014 Incheon	Doubles
Bronze medal – third place	2014 Incheon	Team
Asian Championships
Silver medal – second place	2013 Busan	Team
Bronze medal – third place	2013 Busan	Singles

Kenta Matsudaira (松平 健太, Matsudaira Kenta; born April 11, 1991) is a Japanese table tennis player. Winner of the 2006 World Junior Championships in singles, he was the world number one junior player in 2008. He is world-renowned for his tomahawk serve, which he has popularized throughout his career. The serve itself is rather unorthodox but still ample in efficiency, making it even more effective due to its unfamiliar nature. His serve has been one of the imperative factors in his illustrious junior career, alongside making him a top 50 player for many years. He also utilizes its reverse variation.

Matsudaira became well known on the world stage after his match against the Olympic champion Ma Lin at the 2009 World Table Tennis Championships, where he demonstrated his advanced tomahawk serves, compact and explosive technique, alongside his dynamic backhand control. He won two straight games from a 1–3 deficit and held the lead at 4–1 in the seventh (he lost the game 11–9). Later, he beat Ma 4–1 at the 2013 World Table Tennis Championships in the Round of 64. After progressing to the Round of 16 and beating Vladimir Samsonov 4–3, he lost in the quarter-finals to the bronze medalist, Xu Xin, in 6 games. This is regarded as his best performance in his adult career and was considered to have performed the best out of all of the non-Chinese players. He is ranked 17 in the world as of January, 2017.
