= Enkhbatyn Lkhagvasüren =

Mongolian table tennis player

Personal information
- Nationality: Mongolia
- Born: 10 August 1988 (age 36); Ulaanbaatar, Mongolia

Sport
- Sport: Table tennis

Enkhbatyn Lkhagvasüren (Mongolian: Энхбатын Лхагвасүрэн; born 10 August 1988) is a Mongolian table tennis player. He competed in the 2020 Summer Olympics. He is four-time champion of Mongolia in a single event
