= Chen Chien-an =

Taiwanese table tennis player

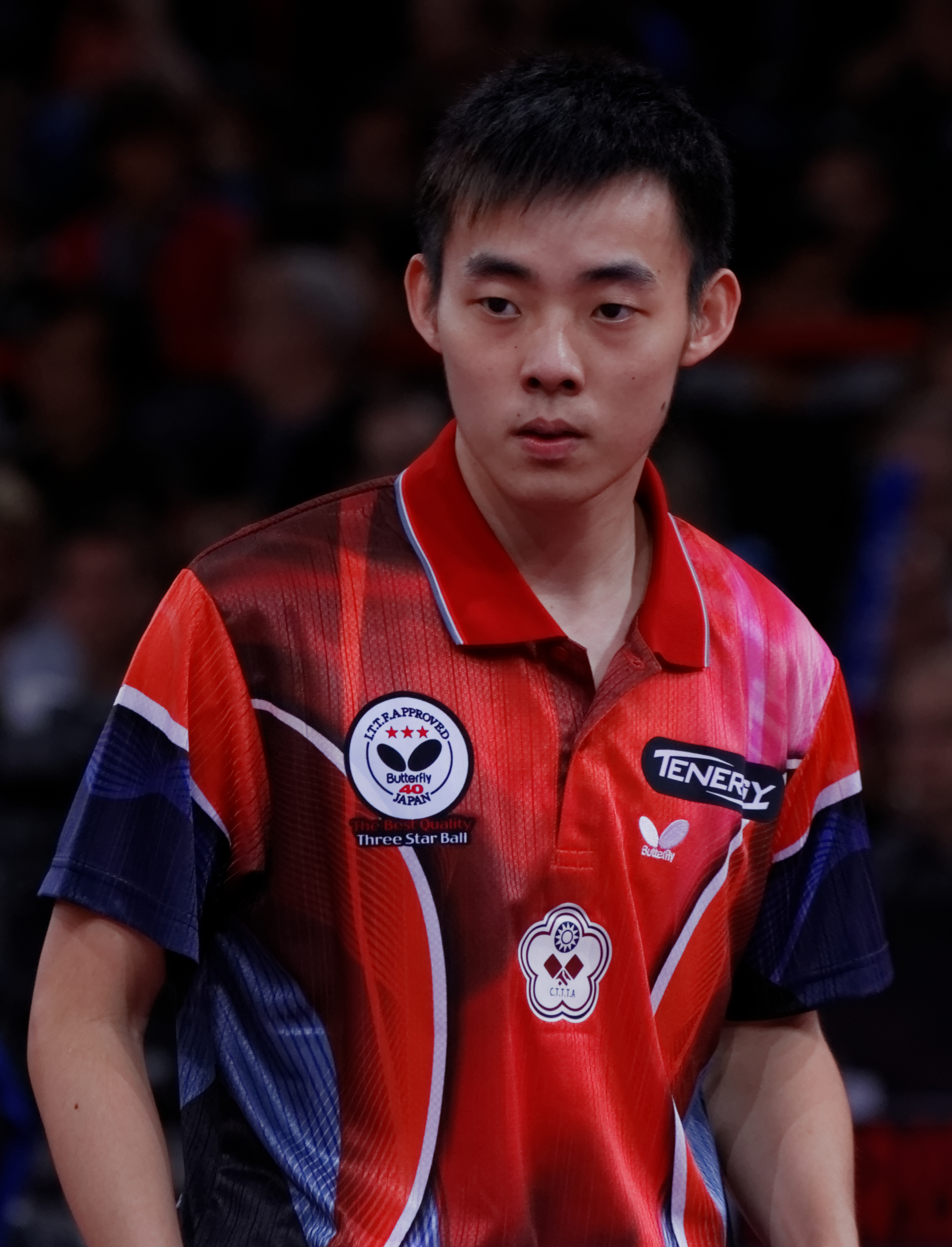
- Chen at the 2013 World Table Tennis Championships

Personal information
- Born: 16 June 1991 (age 35) Hsinchu County, Taiwan
- Height: 1.70 m (5 ft 7 in)
- Weight: 72 kg (159 lb)

Sport
- Sport: Table tennis
- Club: Ryukyu Asteeda
- Playing style: Left-handed shakehand grip
- Highest ranking: 17 (November 2014)
Medal record
Representing Chinese Taipei
World Championships
Gold medal – first place	2013 Paris	Doubles
Silver medal – second place	2017 Düsseldorf	Mixed doubles
Bronze medal – third place	2014 Tokyo	Team
Asian Games
Bronze medal – third place	2014 Incheon	Team
Bronze medal – third place	2018 Jakarta	Team
Asian Championships
Bronze medal – third place	2013 Busan	Team
Bronze medal – third place	2012 Macau	Team

Chen Chien-an
- Traditional Chinese: 陳建安
- Simplified Chinese: 陈建安
Transcriptions
Standard Mandarin
- Hanyu Pinyin: Chén Jiàn'ān
- Wade–Giles: Ch'ên^{2} Chien^{4}-an^{1}

Chen Chien-an (Chinese: 陳建安; born 16 June 1991) is a Taiwanese table tennis player. He won the 2008 World Junior Table Tennis Championships in singles.

In May 2013, in the 52nd World Table Tennis Championships held in Paris, France, Chen Chien-an and Chuang Chih-yuan defeated Hao Shuai and Ma Lin 9–11, 12–10, 11–6, 13–11, 9–11, 11–8 in the final, and won Men's Doubles title. Chuang and Chen became the first athletes in Taiwan to win any World Table Tennis Championships title.

Chen Chien-an is sponsored by the German table tennis brand TIBHAR.
