= Lee Sang-su =

South Korean table tennis player

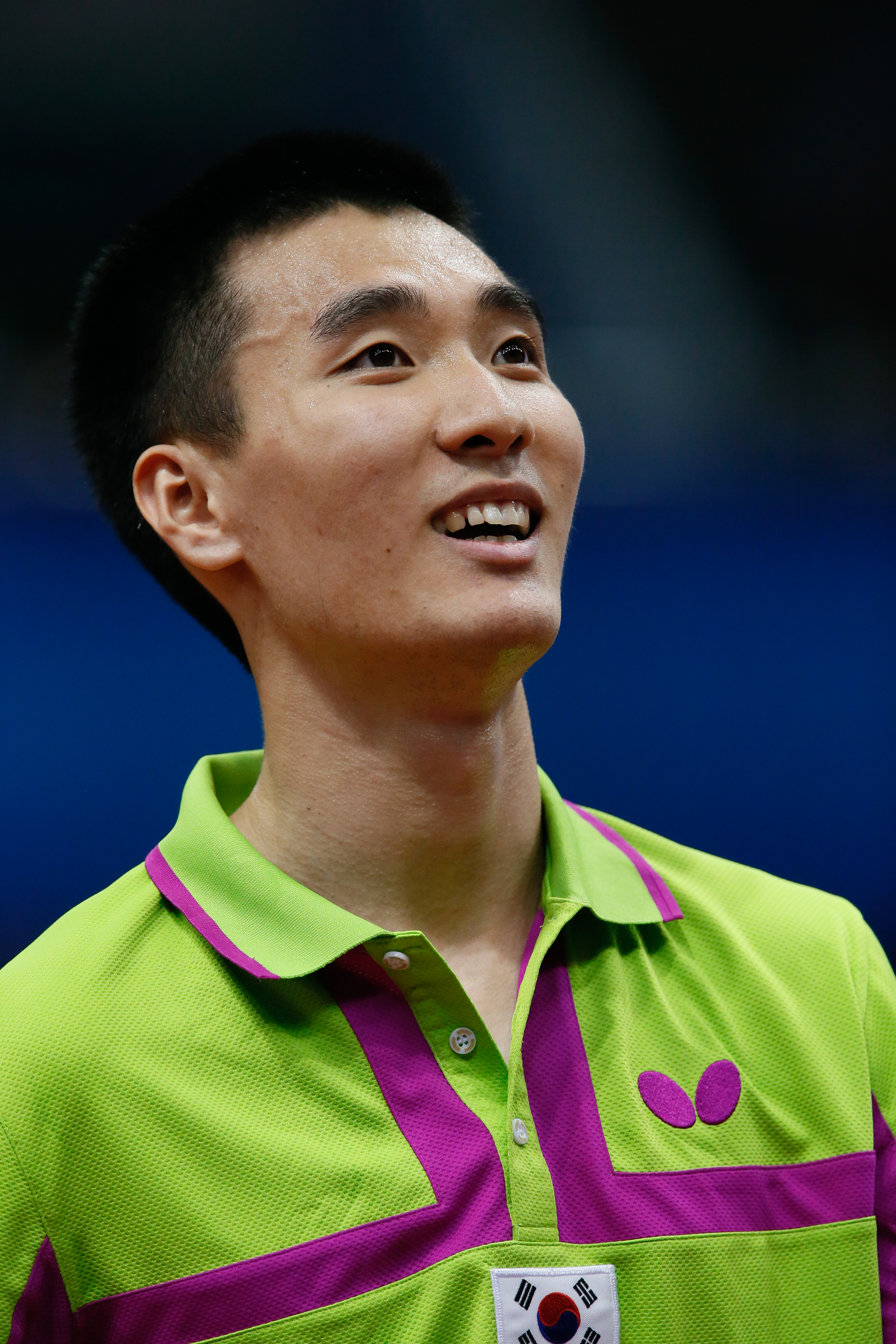

Personal information
- Born: 13 August 1990 (age 35) Seoul, South Korea
- Height: 1.80 m (5 ft 11 in)
- Weight: 69 kg (152 lb)

Sport
- Sport: Table tennis
- Playing style: Right-handed, shakehand grip
- Highest ranking: 6 (April 2019)
- Current ranking: 26 (15 July 2025)
Medal record
Men's table tennis
Representing South Korea
World Championships
Silver medal – second place	2013 Paris	Mixed doubles
Bronze medal – third place	2015 Suzhou	Doubles
Bronze medal – third place	2016 Kuala Lumpur	Team
Bronze medal – third place	2017 Düsseldorf	Singles
Bronze medal – third place	2017 Düsseldorf	Doubles
Bronze medal – third place	2018 Halmstad	Team
Bronze medal – third place	2023 Durban	Doubles
Bronze medal – third place	2024 Busan	Team
World Cup
Silver medal – second place	2023 Chengdu	Mixed team
Bronze medal – third place	2018 London	Team
Asian Games
Silver medal – second place	2018 Jakarta	Team
Bronze medal – third place	2018 Jakarta	Singles
Asian Championships
Gold medal – first place	2013 Busan	Mixed doubles
Gold medal – first place	2021 Doha	Singles
Gold medal – first place	2021 Doha	Team
Silver medal – second place	2015 Pattaya	Doubles
Bronze medal – third place	2013 Busan	Team
Bronze medal – third place	2015 Pattaya	Team
Summer Universiade
Bronze medal – third place	2015 Gwangju	Singles

Lee Sang-su (born 13 August 1990) is a South Korean retired table tennis player. He won two singles titles at the ITTF Pro Tour, the first one was in 2010. He reached semifinals in singles event at the 2017 World Championships.

Lee Sangsu represented South Korea at the 2020 Tokyo Olympics in the men's team event after winning the Olympic trials held in February 2021.

== Singles titles ==
Year	Tournament	Final opponent	Score	Ref
2010	ITTF Pro Tour Slovenia Open	(Sweden) Jens Lundqvist	4–1	
2011	ITTF Pro Tour Polish Open	(Russia) Alexander Shibaev	4–0	
2021	Asian Championships	(Chinese Taipei) Chuang Chih-yuan	3–2	
