= Tang Peng =

Chinese-born Hong Kong table tennis player

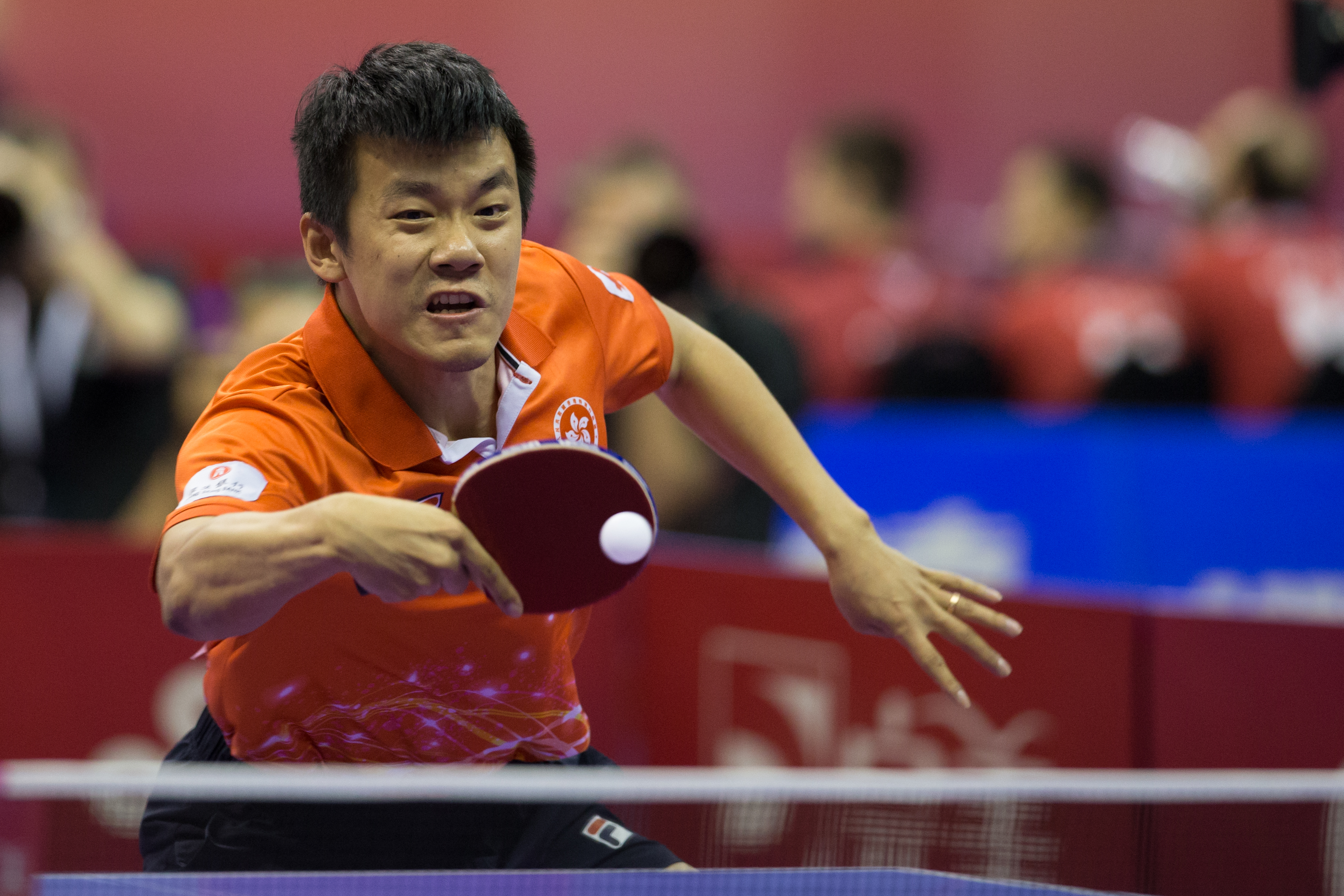
- Tang in 2016

Personal information
- Full name: Tang Peng
- Nationality: Hong Kong, China
- Born: 4 February 1981 (age 45) Beijing, China
- Height: 1.76 m (5 ft 9 1/2 in)
- Weight: 73 kg (161 lb; 11.5 st)

Sport
- Sport: Table tennis
- Playing style: Right-handed, shakehand grip Forehand: Reverse Rubber; Backhand: Short Pimples
- Highest ranking: 11 (May 2015)
- Current ranking: 19 (December 2016)
Medal record
Men's table tennis
Representing Hong Kong
World Championships
Bronze medal – third place	2008 Guangzhou	Team

Tang Peng (simplified Chinese: 唐鹏; traditional Chinese: 唐鵬; pinyin: Táng Péng; Jyutping: tong^{4} paang^{4}; born 4 February 1981 in Beijing, China) is mainland Chinese-born table tennis player who now represents Hong Kong. He recently married Tie Yana, another Chinese-born table tennis player representing Hong Kong. As of December 2016, he is ranked the number nineteenth player in the world.

== Career records ==
Singles (as of 19 January 2014)

- World Championships: 1/4 finals (2015).
- Pro Tour runner-up (1): 2007 Chile Open.
- Asian Championships: runner-up (2003).

Men's doubles

- World Championships: QF (2009).
- Pro Tour winner (4): 2010 Austrian Open, 2014 Spanish Open, 2014 Australian Open, 2014 Russian Open.
- Pro Tour Grand Finals appearances: 2. Won in 2010.
- Asian Championships: SF (2003).

Mixed doubles

- World Championships: QF (2007).
- Asian Championships: SF (2003).

Team

- Summer Olympic: 4th (2012)
- World Championships: 3rd (2008).
- World Team Cup: 3rd (2009).
- Asian Championships: winner (2003).
