= Jiang Tianyi =

Hong Kong table tennis player

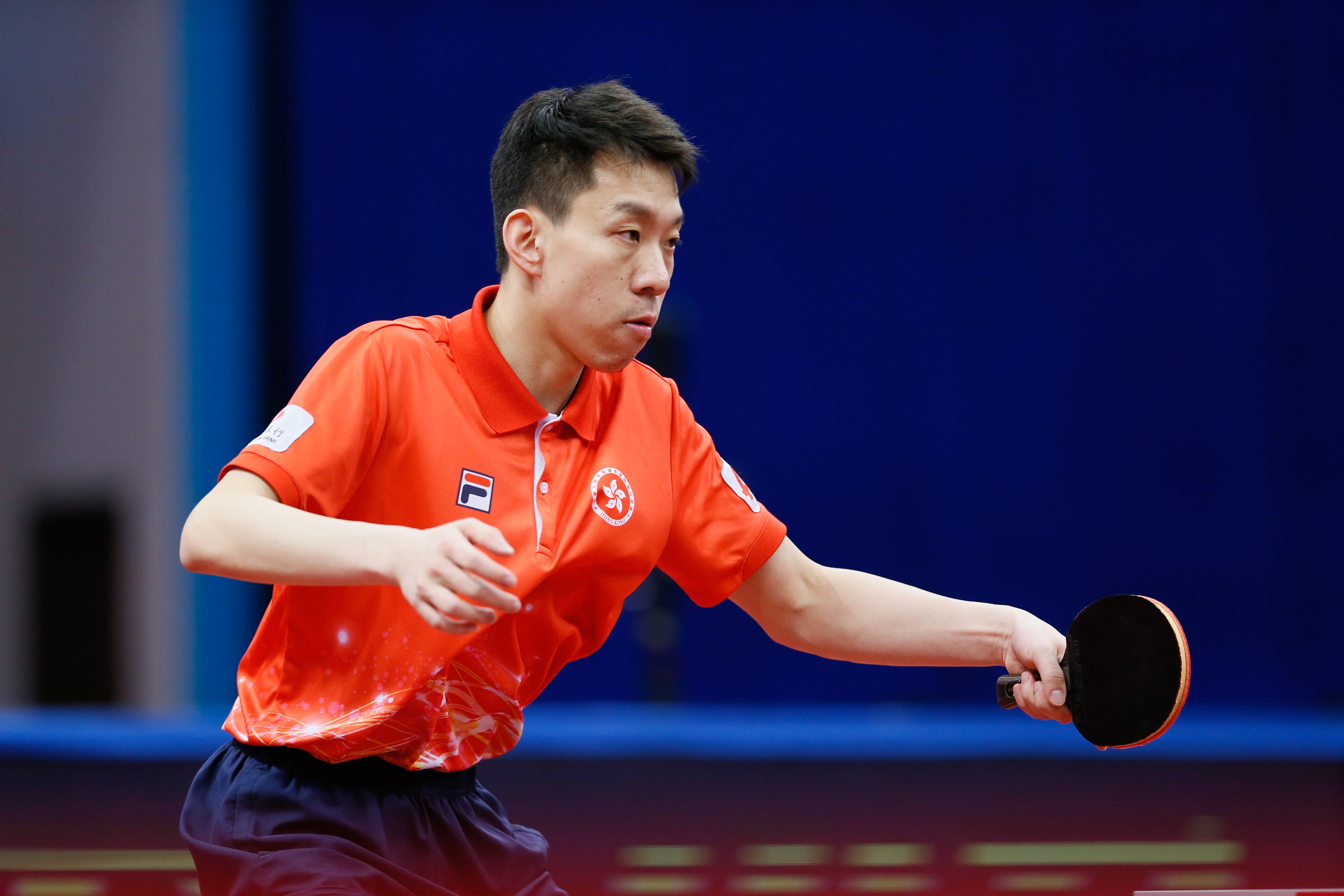
- Jiang Tianyi

Personal information
- Native name: 江天一
- Nationality: Hong Kong
- Born: 28 February 1988 (age 38) Jinan, Shandong, China
- Height: 1.81 m (5 ft 11 1/2 in)
- Weight: 67 kg (148 lb; 10.6 st)

Sport
- Sport: Table tennis
- Playing style: Left-handed, shakehand grip
- Highest ranking: 14 (December 2012)
Medal record
Men's table tennis
Representing Hong Kong
Asian Games
Silver medal – second place	2014 Incheon	Mixed Doubles

Jiang Tianyi (Chinese: 江天一; pinyin: Jiāng Tiānyī; Jyutping: gong^{1} tin^{1} jat^{1}; born 28 February 1988) is a male table tennis player. He won the men's singles title at the 2008 Brazil Open. In 2010, he won 3 doubles titles on the ITTF Pro Tour, including 2010 ITTF Pro Tour Grand Finals.
