= Chiang Hung-chieh =

Taiwanese table tennis player

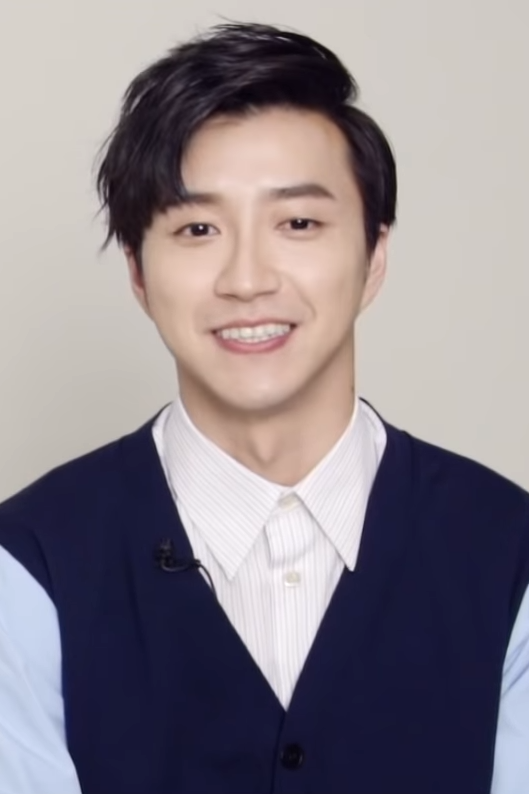
- Chiang in 2019
- Born: 江宏傑; 22 February 1989 (age 37); Hsinchu, Taiwan
- Occupation: Table tennis player
- Height: 1.77 m (5 ft 10 in)
- Spouse: Ai Fukuhara (m. 2016; div. 2021)

Chiang Hung-chieh (Chinese: 江宏傑; born 22 February 1989) is a Taiwanese table tennis player. He competed at the 2016 Summer Olympics as part of Taiwan's team in the men's team event. He married Japanese table tennis player Ai Fukuhara following the Rio Olympics. In March 2021, Ai and Chiang were reported to have filed for divorce. The couple jointly announced their divorce in July 2021.
