= 2019 in table tennis =

This page lists notable table tennis events taking place in 2019.

== World table tennis events ==
Senior

- April 21–28: 2019 World Table Tennis Championships in (Hungary) Budapest
  - Singles: (China) Ma Long (m) / (China) Liu Shiwen (f)
  - Doubles: China (Ma Long & Wang Chuqin) (m) / China (Sun Yingsha & Wang Manyu) (f)
  - Mixed: China (Xu Xin & Liu Shiwen)
- October 18–20: 2019 ITTF Women's World Cup in (China) Chengdu
  - Winner: (China) Liu Shiwen
- November 6–10: 2019 ITTF Team World Cup in Tokyo
  - Men: China defeated South Korea, 3–1 in games played, to win their eighth consecutive and tenth overall Men's ITTF Team World Cup title.
    - Both Chinese Taipei and Japan took third place each.
  - Women: China defeated Japan, 3–0 in games played, to win their ninth consecutive and 11th overall Women's ITTF Team World Cup title.
    - Both Chinese Taipei and South Korea took third place each.
- November 29 – December 1: 2019 ITTF Men's World Cup in (China) Chengdu

Junior and cadet

- October 23–31: 2019 ITTF World Cadet Challenge in (Poland) Władysławowo
  - Singles: (Romania) Darius Movileanu (m) / (Japan) Kaho Akae (f)
  - Men's doubles: (Japan) Sora Matsushima & (Iran) Navid Shams
  - Women's doubles: (Japan) Kaho Akae & (South Korea) LEE Yeon-hui
  - Mixed: (Singapore) Izaac Yong QUEK & (Romania) Elena Zaharia
- November 24 – December 1: 2019 World Junior Table Tennis Championships in (Thailand) Korat

== Continental table tennis championships ==
=== Africa (TT) ===
Senior

- August 3–5: 2019 ITTF African Cup in (Nigeria) Lagos
  - Singles: (Egypt) Omar Assar (m) / (Egypt) Dina Meshref (f)
- August 20–29: 2019 African Games in (Morocco) Rabat
  - Singles: (Nigeria) Olajide Omotayo (m) / (Egypt) Dina Meshref (f)
  - Doubles: Algeria (Sami Kherouf & Mohamed Sofiene Boudjadja) (m) / Nigeria (Offiong Edem & Cecilia Otuime Akpan) (f)
  - Mixed: Egypt (Omar Assar & Dina Meshref)

Junior and cadet

- April 7–13: 2019 African Youth, Junior and cadet Championships in (Ghana) Accra

- Junior boys' singles: (Nigeria) Azeez Solanke
- Junior girls' singles: (Egypt) Sara El-Hakem
- Junior boys' doubles: Nigeria (Jamiu Ayanwale & Azeez Solanke)
- Junior girls' doubles: Egypt (Sara El-Hakem & Hend Fathy)
- Junior mixed doubles: Egypt (Marwan Abdelwahab & Alaa Yehia)
- Cadet boys' singles: (Nigeria) Taiwo Mati
- Cadet girls' singles: (Egypt) Hana Goda

=== Americas (TT) ===
Senior

- February 1–3: 2019 ITTF Pan-America Cup in (Puerto Rico) Guaynabo
  - Singles: (Brazil) Hugo Calderano (m) / (Puerto Rico) Adriana Díaz (f)
- August 4–10: 2019 Pan American Games in (Peru) Lima
  - Singles: (Brazil) Hugo Calderano (m) / (Puerto Rico) Adriana Díaz
  - Doubles: Brazil (Hugo Calderano & Gustavo Tsuboi) (m) / Puerto Rico (Adriana Díaz & Melanie Díaz) (f)
  - Mixed doubles: Canada (Eugene Wang & Zhang Mo)
  - Men's team: United States (Nicholas Tio, Nikhil Kumar, & Kanak Jha)
  - Women's team: Puerto Rico (Melanie Díaz, Daniely Ríos, & Adriana Díaz)
- September 3–8: 2019 Pan American Table Tennis Championships in (Paraguay) Asunción
  - Singles: (Brazil) Vitor Ishiy (m) / (United States) Lily Zhang (f)
  - Doubles: Argentina (Gaston Alto & Horacio Cifuentes) (m) / United States (Jennifer Wu & Lily Zhang) (f)
  - Mixed doubles: United States (ZHANG Kai & Lily Zhang)
  - Men's team: Brazil (Vitor Ishiy, Thiago Monteiro, Eric Jouti, & Gustavo Tsuboi)
  - Women's team: United States (Jennifer Wu, Lily Zhang, Crystal Wang, & Amy Wang)

Junior and cadet

- June 24–29: 2019 Pan American Junior Table Tennis Championships in (Mexico) Cancún
  - Note: This table tennis event ended prematurely, due to no venue(s) available to complete the tournament.
  - Mixed: United States (Nikhil Kumar & Amy Wang)

=== Asia (TT) ===
Senior

- April 5–7: 2019 ITTF-ATTU Asian Cup in (Japan) Yokohama
  - Singles: (China) Fan Zhendong (m) / (China) Zhu Yuling (f)
- September 15–22: 2019 Asian Table Tennis Championships in (Indonesia) Yogyakarta
  - Singles: (China) Xu Xin (m) / (China) Sun Yingsha (f)
  - Doubles: China (Liang Jingkun & Lin Gaoyuan) (m) / China (Ding Ning & Zhu Yuling) (f)
  - Mixed: China (Xu Xin & Liu Shiwen)

Junior and cadet

- September 2–7: 2019 Asian Junior and cadet Championships in (Mongolia) Ulaanbaatar

- Junior boys' singles: (China) XU Yingbin
- Junior girls' singles: (Japan) Miyu Nagasaki
- Junior boys' doubles: Japan (Yukiya Uda & Shunsuke Togami)
- Junior girls' doubles: Japan (Miyuu Kihara & Miyu Nagasaki)
- Junior mixed doubles: China (XU Yingbin & SHI Xunyao)
- Cadet boys' singles: (China) CHEN Yuanyu
- Cadet girls' singles: (China) CHEN Yi

=== Europe (TT) ===
Senior

- February 2 & 3: 2019 Europe Top 16 Cup in (Switzerland) Montreux
  - Singles: (Germany) Dimitrij Ovtcharov (m) / (Germany) Petrissa Solja (f)
- June 22–29: 2019 European Games in (Belarus) Minsk
  - Singles: (Germany) Timo Boll (m) / (Portugal) Fu Yu (f)
  - Doubles: Germany (Patrick Franziska, Dimitrij Ovtcharov, & Timo Boll) (m) / Germany (Han Ying, Nina Mittelham, & Shan Xiaona) (f)
  - Mixed: Germany (Patrick Franziska & Petrissa Solja)
- September 3–8: 2019 European Table Tennis Championships in (France) Nantes
  - Men's team winners: Germany (Timo Boll, Ruwen Filus, Patrick Franziska, Dimitrij Ovtcharov, & Benedikt Duda)
  - Women's team winners: Romania (Daniela Dodean, Elizabeta Samara, Bernadette Szőcs, Irina Ciobanu, & Adina Diaconu)

U-21, Junior and cadet

- March 7–10: 2019 European Under-21 Table Tennis Championships in (Portugal) Gondomar
  - Singles: (Greece) Ioannis Sgouropoulos (m) / (Romania) Adina Diaconu (f)
  - Doubles: Slovenia (Darko Jorgic & Peter Hribar) (m) / (England) Tin-Tin Ho & (Austria) Karoline Mischek (f)
- July 7–16: 2019 Table Tennis European Youth Championships in (Czech Republic) Ostrava
  - Junior
    - Singles: (Sweden) Truls Moregard (m) / (Poland) Anna Węgrzyn (f)
    - Doubles: Russia (Lev Katsman & Maksim Grebnev) (m) / Russia (Kristina Kazantseva & Mariia Tailakova) (f)
    - Mixed: Poland (Samuel Kulczycki & Katarzyna Węgrzyn)
    - Team: Russia (m) / Germany (f)
  - Cadet
    - Singles: (Romania) Darius Movileanu (m) / (Romania) Elena Zaharia (f)
    - Doubles: Romania (Iulian Chiriță & Eduard Ionescu) (m) / (France) Prithika Pavade & Elena Zaharia (f)
    - Mixed: France (Thibault Poret & Prithika Pavade)
    - Team: Russia (m) / France (f)
- October 4–6: 2019 European Youth Top 10 in (Netherlands) Noordwijk
  - For results, click here.

=== Oceania (TT) ===
Senior

- May 25 & 26: 2019 ITTF-Oceania Cup in (French Polynesia) Bora Bora
  - Singles: (Australia) Hu Heming (m) / (Australia) Jian Fang Lay (f)

Junior and cadet

- August 7–10: 2019 ITTF-Oceania Junior Championships in (Tonga) Nukuʻalofa

- Junior boys' singles: (New Zealand) Nathan Xu
- Junior girls' singles: (Australia) Parleen Kaur
- Junior boys' doubles: Australia (Nicholas Lum & Finn Luu)
- Junior girls' doubles: Australia (Matilda Alexandersson & Parleen Kaur)
- Junior mixed doubles: Australia (Finn Luu & Parleen Kaur)
- Cadet boys' singles: (Australia) Finn Luu
- Cadet girls' singles: (Australia) Chermaine Quah
- Cadet boys' doubles: Australia (Nicholas Lum & Finn Luu)
- Cadet girls' doubles: Australia (Constantina Psihogios & Chermaine Quah)
- Cadet mixed doubles: Australia (Isaiah Lee & Constantina Psihogios)

== 2019 ITTF World Veterans Tour ==
- Note: This tour made its debut this year.
- August 8–11: WVT 2019 - Shenzhen in China
  - For results, click here.
- September 11–15: WVT 2019 - Townsville in Australia
  - For results, click here.
- October 17–20: WVT 2019 - Fort Lauderdale in the United States
  - For results, click here.
- November 7–10: WVT 2019 - Doha in Qatar
  - For results, click here.
- December 13–16: WVT 2019 - Cardiff (final) in Wales (Great Britain}

== 2019 ITTF World Tour ==
World Tour Platinum events

- March 26–31: 2019 Qatar Open in Doha
  - Singles: (China) Ma Long (m) / (China) Wang Manyu (f)
  - Doubles: Hong Kong (Ho Kwan Kit & Wong Chun Ting) (m) / China (SUN Yingsha & Wang Manyu) (f)
  - Mixed: China (Xu Xin & Liu Shiwen)
- May 28 – June 2: 2019 China Open in Shenzhen
  - Singles: (China) Ma Long (m) / (China) Chen Meng (f)
  - Doubles: Germany (Timo Boll & Patrick Franziska) (m) / China (Gu Yuting & Liu Shiwen) (f)
  - Mixed: Chinese Taipei (LIN Yun-ju & Cheng I-ching)
- June 12–16: 2019 Japan Open in Sapporo
  - Singles: (China) Xu Xin (m) / (China) SUN Yingsha (f)
  - Doubles: China (Fan Zhendong & Xu Xin) (m) / China (Chen Meng & Liu Shiwen) (f)
  - Mixed: China (Xu Xin & Zhu Yuling)
- July 9–14: 2019 Australian Open in (Australia) Geelong
  - Singles: (China) Xu Xin (m) / (China) SUN Yingsha (f)
  - Doubles: South Korea (Jeoung Young-sik & Lee Sang-su) (m) / China (Chen Meng & Wang Manyu) (f)
  - Mixed: Hong Kong (Wong Chun Ting & Doo Hoi Kem)
- October 8–13: 2019 German Open in (Germany) Bremen
  - Singles: (China) Fan Zhendong (m) / (China) SUN Yingsha (f)
  - Doubles: China (Liang Jingkun & Xu Xin) (m) / South Korea (Jeon Ji-hee & Yang Ha-eun) (f)
  - Mixed: China (Xu Xin & SUN Yingsha)
- November 12–17: 2019 Austrian Open in (Austria) Linz

World Tour events

- January 15–20: 2019 Hungarian Open in (Hungary) Budapest
  - Singles: (China) Lin Gaoyuan (m) / (China) Chen Meng (f)
  - Doubles: China (Liang Jingkun & Xu Xin) (m) / China (Wang Manyu & Zhu Yuling) (f)
  - Mixed: China (Xu Xin & Liu Shiwen)
- June 4–9: 2019 Hong Kong Open in Hong Kong
  - Singles: (China) Lin Gaoyuan (m) / (China) WANG Yidi (f)
  - Doubles: China (Liang Jingkun & Lin Gaoyuan) (m) / China (CHEN Ke & Mu Zi) (f)
  - Mixed: Chinese Taipei (LIN Yun-ju & Cheng I-ching)
- July 2–7: 2019 Korea Open in (South Korea) Busan
  - Singles: (China) Xu Xin (m) / (China) Chen Meng (f)
  - Doubles: China (Fan Zhendong & Xu Xin) (m) / China (Chen Meng & Wang Manyu) (f)
  - Mixed: Hong Kong (Wong Chun Ting & Doo Hoi Kem)
- August 13–18: 2019 Bulgarian Open in (Bulgaria) Panagyurishte
  - Singles: (Japan) Tomokazu Harimoto (m) / (China) Chen Xingtong (f)
  - Doubles: South Korea (Jeoung Young-sik & Lee Sang-su) (m) / China (Gu Yuting & Mu Zi) (f)
  - Mixed: Japan (Jun Mizutani & Mima Ito)
- August 20–25: 2019 Czech Open in (Czech Republic) Olomouc
  - Singles: (Chinese Taipei) LIN Yun-ju (m) / (China) Chen Xingtong (f)
  - Doubles: South Korea (CHO Dae-seong & Lee Sang-su) (m) / China (Gu Yuting & Mu Zi) (f)
  - Mixed: South Korea (CHO Dae-seong & SHIN Yu-bin)
- October 1–6: 2019 Swedish Open in (Sweden) Stockholm
  - Singles: (China) Wang Chuqin (m) / (China) Chen Meng (f)
  - Doubles: China (Fan Zhendong & Xu Xin) (m) / China (Chen Meng & Ding Ning) (f)
  - Mixed: China (Xu Xin & Liu Shiwen)

Grand Finals

- December 12–15: 2019 ITTF World Tour Grand Finals in (China) Zhengzhou

== 2019 ITTF Challenge Series ==
Plus events

- February 13–17: Portugal Open in Lisbon
  - Singles: (China) Liang Jingkun (m) / (Japan) Hina Hayata (f)
  - Doubles: China (CAO Wei & XU Yingbin) (m) / China (FAN Siqi & YANG Huijing) (f)
  - Mixed doubles: China (Lin Gaoyuan & Liu Shiwen)
- March 20–24: Oman Open in Muscat
  - Singles: (Chinese Taipei) LIN Yun-Ju (m) / (Japan) Hina Hayata (f)
  - Doubles: Chinese Taipei (LIAO Cheng-Ting & LIN Yun-Ju) (m) / Japan (Satsuki Odo & Saki Shibata) (f)
  - Mixed doubles: Chinese Taipei (LIN Yun-Ju & Cheng I-ching)
- July 24–28: Pyongyang Open in North Korea
  - Singles: (North Korea) AN Ji-song (m) / (North Korea) Kim Song-i (f)
  - Doubles: North Korea (HAM Yu-song & RI Kwang-myong) (m) / North Korea (CHA Hyo-sim & KIM Nam-hae) (f)
  - Mixed doubles: North Korea (HAM Yu-song & CHA Hyo-sim)
- August 7–11: Nigeria Open in Lagos
  - Singles: (Nigeria) Quadri Aruna (m) / (Russia) Polina Mikhaylova (f)
  - Doubles: (Belgium) Cedric Nuytinck & (France) Quentin Robinot (m) / Russia (Polina Mikhaylova & Yana Noskova) (f)
  - Mixed doubles: Germany (Kilian Ort & WAN Yuan)
- September 10–14: Paraguay Open in Asunción
  - Singles: (Japan) Masataka Morizono (m) / (Japan) Hina Hayata (f)
  - Doubles: Masataka Morizono & (Slovakia) Ľubomír Pištej (m) / Japan (Honoka Hashimoto & Maki Shiomi) (f)
  - Mixed doubles: Puerto Rico (Brian Afanador & Adriana Díaz)
- December 4–8: Canada Open in Markham

Regular events

- March 20–24: Spanish Open in (Spain) Guadalajara
  - Singles: (Denmark) ZHAI Yujia (m) / (Japan) Miyu Kato (f)
  - Doubles: Germany (Kilian Ort & QIU Dang) (m) / France (Stephanie Loeuillette & YUAN Jianan) (f)
- May 1–5: Serbia Open in Belgrade
  - Singles: (England) Paul Drinkhall (m) / (Japan) Hina Hayata (f)
  - Doubles: Portugal (Diogo Carvalho & João Geraldo) (m) / Hong Kong (NG Wing Nam & Minnie Wai Yam SOO) (f)
- May 8–12: Slovenia Open in Otočec
  - Singles: (Croatia) Wei Shihao (m) / (Hungary) Georgina Póta (f)
  - Doubles: Brazil (Eric Jouti & Gustavo Tsuboi) (m) / Japan (Miyuu Kihara & Miyu Nagasaki) (f)
- May 14–18: Croatia Open in Zagreb
  - Singles: (Sweden) Anton Kallberg (m) / (Japan) Miyuu Kihara (f)
  - Doubles: Japan (Shunsuke Togami & Yukiya Uda) (m) / Japan (Miyuu Kihara & Miyu Nagasaki) (f)
- May 22–26: Thailand Open in Bangkok
  - Singles: (Germany) Ruwen Filus (m) / (Japan) Hitomi Sato (f)
  - Doubles: Germany (Ruwen Filus & Steffen Mengel) (m) / Japan (Satsuki Odo & Saki Shibata) (f)
- October 16–20: Mexico Open in Cancún
  - Event cancelled.
- October 16–20: Polish Open in (Poland) Władysławowo
  - Singles: (China) XU Yingbin (m) / (China) HE Zhuojia (f)
  - Doubles: Argentina (Gaston Alto & Horacio Cifuentes) (m) / Japan (Honoka Hashimoto & Maki Shiomi) (f)
- October 30 – November 3: Belarus Open in Minsk
  - Singles: (France) Emmanuel Lebesson (m) / (Japan) Hina Hayata (f)
  - Doubles: China (Xu Haidong & ZHAO Zhaoyan) (m) / Japan (Satsuki Odo & Saki Shibata) (f)
- October 30 – November 3: Morocco Open in Agadir
  - Event cancelled.
- November 13–17: Indonesia Open in Batam
- November 19–23: Turkish Open in (Turkey) Antalya
  - Event cancelled.

== 2019 ITTF World Junior Circuit ==
Golden Series events

- May 15–19: Thailand Junior and cadet Open in Bangkok
  - Junior Singles: (Thailand) Yanapong Panagitgun (m) / (China) KUAI Man (f)
  - Cadet Singles: (Belgium) Louis Laffineur (m) / (China) KUAI Man (f)
- June 12–16: China Junior and cadet Open in Taicang
  - Junior Singles: (China) QUAN Kaiyuan (m) / (China) YUAN Yuan (f)
  - Cadet Singles: (China) CHEN Yaxuan (m) / (China) CHEN Yi (f)
- August 7–11: Hong Kong Junior and cadet Open in Hong Kong

- Junior boys' singles: (Iran) Amin Ahmadian
- Junior girls' singles: (Japan) Haruna Ojio
- Junior boys' doubles: (Iran) Amin Ahmadian & (Thailand) Yanapong Panagitgun
- Junior girls' doubles: Chinese Taipei (CHIEN Tung-Chuan & YU Hsiu-Ting)
- Cadet boys' singles: (Japan) Sora Matsushima
- Cadet girls' singles: (South Korea) KIM Na-yeong
- Cadet boys' doubles: Chinese Taipei (CHUANG Chia-Chuan & KAO Cheng-Jui)
- Cadet girls' doubles: Japan (Miwa Harimoto & Haruna Ojio)

- September 18–22: Croatian Junior and cadet Open in (Croatia) Varaždin

- Junior boys' singles: (China) NIU Guankai
- Junior girls' singles: (China) KUAI Man
- Junior boys' doubles: China (CAO Yantao & LIANG Guodong)
- Junior girls' doubles: China (WU Yangchen & ZANG Xiaotong)
- Cadet boys' singles: (China) CHEN Yuanyu
- Cadet girls' singles: (China) CHEN Yi
- Cadet boys' doubles: China (LIN Shidong & ZHANG Minghao)
- Cadet girls' doubles: China (CHEN Yi & LENG Yutong)

Premium events

- February 7–11: Bahrain Junior and cadet Open in Manama

- Junior boys' singles: (Russia) Lev Katsman
- Junior girls' singles: (Russia) Kristina Kazantseva
- Junior boys' doubles: Russia (Lev Katsman & Artem Tikhonov)
- Junior girls' doubles: Russia (Kristina Kazantseva & Olga Vishniakova)
- Cadet boys' singles: (India) Payas Jain
- Cadet girls' singles: (India) Anargya Manjunath

- February 13–17: Czech Junior and cadet Open in (Czech Republic) Hodonín

- Junior boys' singles: (Poland) Samuel Kulczycki
- Junior girls' singles: (Japan) Honami Nakamori
- Junior boys' doubles: Singapore (Josh Shao Han CHUA & Yew En Koen PANG)
- Junior girls' doubles: France (Camille Lutz & Prithika Pavade)
- Cadet boys' singles: (Russia) Denis Izumrudov
- Cadet girls' singles: (Japan) Kaho AKAE
- Cadet boys' doubles: France (Milhane Jellouli & Alexis Kouraichi)
- Cadet girls' doubles: Japan (Miwa Harimoto & Yura Shinohara)

- March 20–24: Italy Junior and cadet Open in Lignano

- Junior boys' singles: (China) XIANG Peng
- Junior girls' singles: (China) CHEN Yi
- Junior boys' doubles: China (GAO Yang & ZENG Beixun)
- Junior girls' doubles: China (CHEN Yi & WU Yangchen)
- Cadet boys' singles: (China) LIN Shidong
- Cadet girls' singles: (China) CHEN Yi
- Cadet boys' doubles: China (CHEN Yuanyu & HUANG Youzheng)
- Cadet girls' doubles: China (CHEN Yi & KUAI Man)

- April 10–14: French Junior and cadet Open in (France) Metz

- Junior boys' singles: (Russia) Lev Katsman
- Junior girls' singles: (France) Prithika Pavade
- Junior boys' doubles: Russia (Maksim Grebnev & Lev Katsman)
- Junior girls' doubles: United States (Amy Wang & Crystal Wang)
- Cadet boys' singles: (Japan) Hayate Suzuki
- Cadet girls' singles: (Japan) Sakura Yokoi
- Cadet boys' doubles: (Czech Republic) Simon Belik & (Germany) Mike Hollo
- Cadet girls' doubles: Japan (Kaho Akae & Sakura Yokoi)

- April 15–19: Belgium Junior and cadet Open in Spa

- Junior boys' singles: (China) QUAN Kaiyuan
- Junior girls' singles: (China) ZANG Xiaotong
- Junior boys' doubles: Japan (Hiroto Shinozuka & Jo Yokotani)
- Junior girls' doubles: China (LENG Yutong & LIANG Jiayi)
- Cadet boys' singles: (China) CHEN Yuanyu
- Cadet girls' singles: (China) XU Yi
- Cadet boys' doubles: China (CHEN Yuanyu & LIN Shidong)
- Cadet girls' doubles: Chinese Taipei (LIU Ru-Yun & TSAI Yun-En)

- May 22–26: Polish Junior and cadet Open in (Poland) Władysławowo

- Junior boys' singles: (France) Vincent Picard
- Junior girls' singles: (Japan) Sakura Yokoi
- Junior boys' doubles: France (Lilian Bardet & Vincent Picard)
- Junior girls' doubles: (Czech Republic) Zdena Blaskova & (Germany) Franziska Schreiner
- Cadet boys' singles: (Romania) Darius Movileanu
- Cadet girls' singles: (Japan) Sakura Yokoi
- Cadet boys' doubles: Romania (Andrei Teodor Istrate & Horia Stefan Ursut)
- Cadet girls' doubles: Japan (Ami Shirayama & Sakura Yokoi)

- September 25–29: Chinese Taipei Junior and cadet Open in Taipei

- Junior boys' singles: (Chinese Taipei) TAI Ming-Wei
- Junior girls' singles: (Japan) Kaho Akae
- Junior boys' doubles: Japan (Yu Kayama & Ryoichi Yoshiyama)
- Junior girls' doubles: Chinese Taipei (CHIEN Tung-Chuan & YU Hsiu-Ting)
- Cadet boys' singles: (Chinese Taipei) KAO Cheng-Jui
- Cadet girls' singles: (Japan) Kaho Akae
- Cadet boys' doubles: Chinese Taipei (WU Chiou-Shin & ZHANG Huan-Qi)
- Cadet girls' doubles: Japan (Kaho Akae & Hina Higashikawa)

- October 24–28: Oman Junior and cadet Open in Muscat

- Junior boys' singles: (Chinese Taipei) TAI Ming-Wei
- Junior girls' singles: (Chinese Taipei) CAI Fong-En
- Cadet boys' singles: (Chinese Taipei) CHEN Yen-Ting
- Cadet girls' singles: (Chinese Taipei) CHENG Pu-Syuan

- November 6–10: Hungarian Junior and cadet Open in (Hungary) Szombathely

- Junior boys' singles: (China) QUAN Kaiyuan
- Junior girls' singles: (China) WANG Tianyi
- Junior boys' doubles: China (LIANG Guodong & QUAN Kaiyuan)
- Junior girls' doubles: Chinese Taipei (CHIEN Tung-Chuan & YU Hsiu-Ting)
- Cadet boys' singles: (China) TAO Yuchang
- Cadet girls' singles: (China) LENG Yutong
- Cadet boys' doubles: China (TAO Yuchang & ZHANG Minghao)
- Cadet girls' doubles: China (LENG Yutong & QIN Yuxuan)

Regular events

- February 20–24: Swedish Junior and cadet Open in (Sweden) Örebro

- Junior boys' singles: (Sweden) Truls Moregard
- Junior girls' singles: (Japan) Kaho Akae
- Junior boys' doubles: Singapore (BEH Kun Ting & PANG Yew En Koen)
- Junior girls' doubles: Japan (Honami Nakamori & Yukari Sugasawa)
- Cadet boys' singles: (Japan) Haruki Harada
- Cadet girls' singles: (Japan) Kaho Akae

- March 20–24: Chile Junior and cadet Open in Santiago

- Junior boys' singles: (Argentina) Santiago Lorenzo
- Junior girls' singles: (Brazil) Giulia Takahashi
- Junior boys' doubles: Chile (Nicolas Burgos & Andrés Martínez)
- Junior girls' doubles: Brazil (Tamyres Fukase & Livia Lima)
- Cadet boys' singles: (Peru) Carlos Fernandez
- Cadet girls' singles: (Brazil) Laura Watanabe
- Cadet boys' doubles: Brazil (Henrique Noguti & Joon Shim)
- Cadet girls' doubles: Brazil (Giulia Takahashi & Laura Watanabe)

- April 1–5: Ghana Junior and cadet Open in Accra

- Junior boys' singles: (Nigeria) Azeez Solanke
- Junior girls' singles: (India) Diya Parag Chitale
- Junior boys' doubles: Nigeria (Jamiu Ayanwale & Azeez Solanke)
- Junior girls' doubles: (India) Diya Parag Chitale & (Mauritius) Nandeshwaree Jalim
- Cadet boys' singles: (Nigeria) Taiwo Mati
- Cadet girls' singles: (India) Ananya Chande
- Cadet boys' doubles: Nigeria (Jamiu Ayanwale & Taiwo Mati)
- Cadet girls' doubles: (England) Ruby Chan & (India) Ananya Chande

- April 28 – May 1: Australian Junior and cadet Open in (Australia) Darwin

- Junior boys' singles: (Chinese Taipei) HUANG Yu-Jen
- Junior girls' singles: (Chinese Taipei) YU Hsiu-Ting
- Cadet boys' singles: (Hong Kong) YIU Kwan To
- Cadet girls' singles: (Hong Kong) Phoebe Wai HUI

- May 1–5: Spanish Junior and cadet Open in (Spain) Castell-Platja d'Aro

- Junior boys' singles: (Moldova) Vladislav Ursu
- Junior girls' singles: (Russia) Olga Vishniakova
- Junior boys' doubles: (Brazil) Guilherme Teodoro & (Moldova) Vladislav Ursu
- Junior girls' doubles: Russia (Elizabet Abraamian & Ekaterina Zironova)
- Cadet boys' singles: (France) Alexis Kouraichi
- Cadet girls' singles: (Russia) Vlada Voronina
- Cadet boys' doubles: France (Hugo Deschamps & Felix Lebrun)
- Cadet girls' doubles: Russia (Vlada Voronina & Alina Zavarykina)

- June 12–16: Morocco Junior and cadet Open in Agadir

- Junior boys' singles: (France) Vincent Picard
- Junior girls' singles: (Slovakia) Ema Labosova
- Junior boys' doubles: Slovakia (Filip Delincak & Adam Klajber)
- Junior girls' doubles: Slovakia (Ema Cincurova & Laura Vinczeova)
- Cadet boys' singles: (Nigeria) Taiwo Mati
- Cadet girls' singles: (Algeria) Melissa Belache
- Cadet boys' doubles: (Hungary) Balazs Lei & (Nigeria) Taiwo Mati
- Cadet girls' doubles: Slovakia (Eliska Stullerova & Dominika Wiltschkova)

- August 14–18: El Salvador Junior and cadet Open in San Salvador

- Junior boys' singles: (United States) Jayden Zhou
- Junior girls' singles: (Guatemala) Lucia Cordero
- Junior boys' doubles: United States (Sid Naresh & Jayden Zhou)
- Junior girls' doubles: Guatemala (Lucia Cordero & Hidalynn Zapata)
- Cadet boys' singles: (United States) Jayden Zhou
- Cadet girls' singles: (United States) Nicole Deng
- Cadet boys' doubles: (Mexico) Rogelio Castro & (Guatemala) Diego de la Cruz
- Cadet girls' doubles: El Salvador (Victoria Guevara & Cristina Machado)

- September 24–28: Serbia Junior and cadet Open in Zrenjanin

- Junior boys' singles: (Brazil) Guilherme Teodoro
- Junior girls' singles: (Russia) Elizabet Abraamian
- Junior boys' doubles: Brazil (Guilherme Teodoro & Eduardo Tomoike)
- Junior girls' doubles: Russia (Elizabet Abraamian & Liubov Tentser)
- Cadet boys' singles: (Thailand) Napat Thanmathikom
- Cadet girls' singles: (Kazakhstan) Sarvinoz Mirkadirova
- Cadet boys' doubles: Romania (Daniel Moldovan & Paul Szilagyi)
- Cadet girls' doubles: Germany (Mia Griesel & Jele Stortz)

- October 2–6: Slovenia Junior and cadet Open in Otočec

- Junior boys' singles: (Slovakia) Adam Klajber
- Junior girls' singles: (Hong Kong) POON Yat
- Junior boys' doubles: (Croatia) Ivor Ban & (Belgium) Nicolas Degros
- Junior girls' doubles: Serbia (Reka Bezeg & Radmila Tominjak)
- Cadet boys' singles: (Romania) Andrei Teodor Istrate
- Cadet girls' singles: (Poland) Anna Brzyska
- Cadet boys' doubles: Hungary (Balazs Lei & David Szantosi)
- Cadet girls' doubles: Brazil (Giulia Takahashi & Laura Watanabe)

- October 8–12: North Macedonia Junior and cadet Open in Skopje

- Junior boys' singles: (Romania) Andrei Teodor Istrate
- Junior girls' singles: (Serbia) Radmila Tominjak
- Junior boys' doubles: Croatia (Ivor Ban & Lovro Zovko)
- Junior girls' doubles: Serbia (Reka Bezeg & Radmila Tominjak)
- Cadet boys' singles: (Romania) Paul Szilagyi
- Cadet girls' singles: (Romania) Bianca Mei Rosu
- Cadet boys' doubles: Romania (Andrei Teodor Istrate & Paul Szilagyi)
- Cadet girls' doubles: Romania (Bianca Mei Rosu & Evelyn Ungvari)

- October 16–20: Egypt Junior and cadet Open in Sharm El Sheikh

- Junior boys' singles: (Egypt) Marwan Abdelwahab
- Junior girls' singles: (Chinese Taipei) TSAI Yu-Chin
- Junior boys' doubles: Egypt (Marwan Abdelwahab & Ahmed Elborhamy)
- Junior girls' doubles: Chinese Taipei (CHANG Ying-Ying & TSAI Yu-Chin)
- Cadet boys' singles: (Saudi Arabia) Khalid Alshareif
- Cadet girls' singles: (Egypt) Hana Goda
- Cadet boys' doubles: Czech Republic (Daniel Kostal & Matyas Lebeda)
- Cadet girls' doubles: (Algeria) Melissa Belache & (Egypt) Hana Goda

- October 30 – November 3: Slovak Junior and cadet Open in (Slovakia) Nitra

- Junior boys' singles: (Japan) Seu Goto
- Junior girls' singles: (England) Charlotte Bardsley
- Junior boys' doubles: (Japan) Seu Goto & (United States) Kai Zarehbin
- Junior girls' doubles: Slovakia (Ema Cincurova & Dominika Wiltschkova)
- Cadet boys' singles: (Iran) Navid Shams
- Cadet girls' singles: (France) Charlotte Lutz
- Cadet boys' doubles: France (Flavien Coton & Nathan Lam)
- Cadet girls' doubles: France (Clea de Stoppeleire & Charlotte Lutz)

- November 13–17: Portugal Junior and cadet Open in Guimarães

== See also ==
- International Table Tennis Federation
- 2019 in sports
