= 2019 World Cup =

2019 World Cup can refer to:

- 2019 Archery World Cup
- 2019 FIBA 3x3 World Cup
- 2019 FIBA Basketball World Cup
- 2019 FIBA Under-19 Basketball World Cup
- 2019 FIBA Under-19 Women's Basketball World Cup
- 2019–20 Biathlon World Cup
- 2019 Canoe Slalom World Cup
- Chess World Cup 2019
- 2019 IFSC Climbing World Cup
- 2019 Cricket World Cup
- 2019–20 FIS Cross-Country World Cup, cross-country skiing
- 2019 PDC World Cup of Darts
- 2019 Dubai World Cup, horse racing
- 2019 Kabaddi World Cup
- WKN World Cup 2019, kickboxing and martial arts
- 2019 WMF World Cup, minifootball
- 2019 UCI Mountain Bike World Cup, mountain bike racing
- 2019 Orienteering World Cup
- 2019 Overwatch World Cup
- 2019 Netball World Cup
- 2019 World Cup of Pool
- 2019 Kremlin World Cup, pool
- 2019 Roller Hockey World Cup
- 2019 Rugby World Cup
- 2019 ISSF World Cup, shooting events
- 2019–20 FIS Ski Jumping World Cup
- 2019 FIFA Beach Soccer World Cup
- 2019 FIFA Club World Cup
- 2019 FIFA U-17 World Cup
- 2019 FIFA U-20 World Cup
- 2019 FIFA Women's World Cup
- 2019 World Cup (snooker)
- 2019 FINA Swimming World Cup
- 2019 ITTF Men's World Cup, table tennis
- 2019 ITTF Team World Cup, table tennis
- 2019 ITTF Women's World Cup, table tennis
- 2019 FIVB Volleyball Men's World Cup
- 2019 FIVB Volleyball Women's World Cup
