= 2019 ITTF World Tour Grand Finals =

Agricultural Bank of China 2019 ITTF World Tour Grand Finals
Tournament details
- Dates: 12–15 December 2019
- Edition: 24th
- Total prize money: US$1,001,000
- Location: Zhengzhou, China

Champions
- Men's singles: (China) Fan Zhendong
- Women's singles: (China) Chen Meng
- Men's doubles: (China) Fan Zhendong (China) Xu Xin
- Women's doubles: (Japan) Miyuu Kihara (Japan) Miyu Nagasaki
- Mixed doubles: (China) Xu Xin (China) Liu Shiwen
- Official website: 2019 ITTF World Tour Grand Finals

The 2019 ITTF World Tour Grand Finals was the final competition of the 2019 ITTF World Tour, the International Table Tennis Federation's professional table tennis world tour. It was the 24th edition of the competition, and was held from 12–15 December in Zhengzhou, China.

The competition featured events in five categories: men's singles, women's singles, men's doubles, women's doubles and mixed doubles.

== Events ==
| Event | Gold | Silver | Bronze |
|---|---|---|---|
| Men's Singles | (China) Fan Zhendong | (China) Ma Long | (China) Xu Xin |
| Men's Singles | (China) Fan Zhendong | (China) Ma Long | (China) Lin Gaoyuan |
| Women's Singles | (China) Chen Meng | (China) Wang Manyu | (China) Wang Yidi |
| Women's Singles | (China) Chen Meng | (China) Wang Manyu | (Japan) Mima Ito |
| Men's Doubles | (China) Fan Zhendong (China) Xu Xin | (Chinese Taipei) Liao Cheng-ting (Chinese Taipei) Lin Yun-ju | (Germany) Timo Boll (Germany) Patrick Franziska |
| Men's Doubles | (China) Fan Zhendong (China) Xu Xin | (Chinese Taipei) Liao Cheng-ting (Chinese Taipei) Lin Yun-ju | (China) Liang Jingkun (China) Lin Gaoyuan |
| Women's Doubles | (Japan) Miyuu Kihara (Japan) Miyu Nagasaki | (South Korea) Jeon Ji-hee (South Korea) Yang Ha-eun | (China) Sun Yingsha (China) Wang Manyu |
| Women's Doubles | (Japan) Miyuu Kihara (Japan) Miyu Nagasaki | (South Korea) Jeon Ji-hee (South Korea) Yang Ha-eun | (Chinese Taipei) Chen Szu-yu (Chinese Taipei) Cheng Hsien-tzu |
| Mixed Doubles | (China) Xu Xin (China) Liu Shiwen | (Japan) Jun Mizutani (Japan) Mima Ito | (Hong Kong) Wong Chun Ting (Hong Kong) Doo Hoi Kem |
| Mixed Doubles | (China) Xu Xin (China) Liu Shiwen | (Japan) Jun Mizutani (Japan) Mima Ito | (Chinese Taipei) Lin Yun-ju (Chinese Taipei) Cheng I-ching |

== Qualification ==
Players earned points based on their performances in the singles and doubles tournaments at the 12 events of the 2019 ITTF World Tour. The top 16 men's and women's singles players, and the top eight men's, women's and mixed doubles pairs who satisfied the qualification criteria will be invited to compete.

== Tournament format ==
The singles and doubles tournaments consisted of knockout draws, with 16 players starting each of the singles events and eight pairs starting each of the doubles events. The seedings for the tournament draws were based on final tour standings, not the official ITTF world ranking.

== Men's singles ==
=== Players ===
1. (China) Xu Xin (semifinals)
2. (China) Fan Zhendong (champion)
3. (China) Lin Gaoyuan (semifinals)
4. (China) Ma Long (final)
5. (Japan) Tomokazu Harimoto (quarterfinals)
6. (Chinese Taipei) Lin Yun-ju (quarterfinals)
7. (China) Liang Jingkun (quarterfinals)
8. (Brazil) Hugo Calderano (quarterfinals)
9. (Germany) Timo Boll (first round)
10. (Germany) Dimitrij Ovtcharov (first round)
11. (Germany) Patrick Franziska (first round)
12. (China) Zhao Zihao (first round)
13. (Sweden) Mattias Falck (first round)
14. (South Korea) Jeoung Young-sik (first round)
15. (Japan) Jun Mizutani (first round)
16. (Hong Kong) Wong Chun Ting (first round)

=== Draw ===
First round
1 | (China) Xu Xin | 5 | 8 | 12 | 11 | 11 | 11
12 | (China) Zhao Zihao | 11 | 11 | 10 | 7 | 8 | 4
11 | (Germany) Patrick Franziska | 12 | 4 | 6 | 4
5 | (Japan) Tomokazu Harimoto | 14 | 11 | 11 | 11
7 | (China) Liang Jingkun | 11 | 11 | 11 | 11
16 | (Hong Kong) Wong Chun Ting | 4 | 6 | 8 | 1
14 | (South Korea) Jeoung Young-sik | 11 | 6 | 12 | 2 | 7 | 3
4 | (China) Ma Long | 8 | 11 | 10 | 11 | 11 | 11
3 | (China) Lin Gaoyuan | 13 | 11 | 11 | 4 | 8 | 11
10 | (Germany) Dimitrij Ovtcharov | 11 | 9 | 8 | 11 | 11 | 4
13 | (Sweden) Mattias Falck | 7 | 9 | 11 | 9
6 | (Chinese Taipei) Lin Yun-ju | 11 | 11 | 13 | 11
8 | (Brazil) Hugo Calderano | 11 | 11 | 12 | 11 | 11
15 | (Japan) Jun Mizutani | 6 | 9 | 14 | 4 | 6
9 | (Germany) Timo Boll | 5 | 16 | 10 | 7
2 | (China) Fan Zhendong | 11 | 18 | 12 | 11

Quarterfinals
1 | (China) Xu Xin | 11 | 13 | 11 | 3 | 9 | 13 | 13
5 | (Japan) Tomokazu Harimoto | 6 | 15 | 5 | 11 | 11 | 11 | 11
7 | (China) Liang Jingkun | 11 | 8 | 11 | 4 | 11 | 9 | 8
4 | (China) Ma Long | 9 | 11 | 7 | 11 | 8 | 11 | 11
3 | (China) Lin Gaoyuan | 13 | 11 | 11 | 11
6 | (Chinese Taipei) Lin Yun-ju | 11 | 4 | 5 | 7
8 | (Brazil) Hugo Calderano | 10 | 5 | 7 | 11 | 9
2 | (China) Fan Zhendong | 12 | 11 | 11 | 5 | 11

Semifinals
1 | (China) Xu Xin | 7 | 14 | 7 | 11 | 11 | 6
4 | (China) Ma Long | 11 | 16 | 11 | 4 | 4 | 11
3 | (China) Lin Gaoyuan | 7 | 13 | 3 | 3 | 11 | 3
2 | (China) Fan Zhendong | 11 | 11 | 11 | 11 | 9 | 11

Final
4 | (China) Ma Long | 6 | 10 | 6 | 11 | 8
2 | (China) Fan Zhendong | 11 | 12 | 11 | 6 | 11

== Women's singles ==
=== Players ===
1. (China) Sun Yingsha (quarterfinals)
2. (Japan) Mima Ito (semifinals)
3. (China) Chen Meng (champion)
4. (China) Wang Manyu (final)
5. (China) Chen Xingtong (quarterfinals)
6. (China) Liu Shiwen (quarterfinals)
7. (China) Ding Ning (first round)
8. (China) Wang Yidi (semifinals)
9. (China) Zhu Yuling (first round)
10. (Japan) Miu Hirano (first round)
11. (Japan) Kasumi Ishikawa (first round)
12. (Singapore) Feng Tianwei (first round)
13. (China) He Zhuojia (first round)
14. (Chinese Taipei) Cheng I-ching (first round)
15. (Japan) Hitomi Sato (quarterfinals)
16. (China) Qian Tianyi (first round)

=== Draw ===
First round
1 | (China) Sun Yingsha | 11 | 9 | 9 | 11 | 11 | 11
13 | (China) He Zhuojia | 7 | 11 | 11 | 2 | 8 | 4
10 | (Japan) Miu Hirano | 6 | 7 | 6 | 11 | 5
8 | (China) Wang Yidi | 11 | 11 | 11 | 6 | 11
5 | (China) Chen Xingtong | 11 | 11 | 11 | 11
12 | (Singapore) Feng Tianwei | 3 | 7 | 9 | 5
9 | (China) Zhu Yuling | 8 | 6 | 6 | 6
4 | (China) Wang Manyu | 11 | 11 | 11 | 11
3 | (China) Chen Meng | 11 | 8 | 10 | 12 | 13 | 11 | 11
16 | (China) Qian Tianyi | 7 | 11 | 12 | 14 | 11 | 8 | 6
11 | (Japan) Kasumi Ishikawa | 7 | 12 | 7 | 9
6 | (China) Liu Shiwen | 11 | 14 | 11 | 11
7 | (China) Ding Ning | 11 | 4 | 11 | 8 | 9 | 4
15 | (Japan) Hitomi Sato | 4 | 11 | 7 | 11 | 11 | 11
14 | (Chinese Taipei) Cheng I-ching | 12 | 6 | 11 | 4 | 11 | 3 | 10
2 | (Japan) Mima Ito | 10 | 11 | 7 | 11 | 4 | 11 | 12

Quarterfinals
1 | (China) Sun Yingsha | 11 | 5 | 8 | 11 | 8
8 | (China) Wang Yidi | 11 | 11 | 13 | 9 | 11
5 | (China) Chen Xingtong | 6 | 11 | 7 | 5 | 4
4 | (China) Wang Manyu | 11 | 7 | 11 | 11 | 11
3 | (China) Chen Meng | 11 | 11 | 9 | 6 | 9 | 11 | 11
6 | (China) Liu Shiwen | 7 | 7 | 11 | 11 | 11 | 5 | 1
15 | (Japan) Hitomi Sato | 7 | 7 | 11 | 5
2 | (Japan) Mima Ito | 11 | 11 | 13 | 11

Semifinals
8 | (China) Wang Yidi | 9 | 3 | 8 | 3
4 | (China) Wang Manyu | 11 | 11 | 11 | 11
3 | (China) Chen Meng | 10 | 11 | 11 | 13 | 13
2 | (Japan) Mima Ito | 12 | 8 | 5 | 11 | 11

Final
4 | (China) Wang Manyu | 9 | 6 | 6 | 11 | 6
3 | (China) Chen Meng | 11 | 11 | 11 | 9 | 11

== Men's doubles ==
=== Players ===
1. (South Korea) Jeoung Young-sik / (South Korea) Lee Sang-su (quarterfinals)
2. (China) Fan Zhendong / (China) Xu Xin (champions)
3. (China) Liang Jingkun / (China) Lin Gaoyuan (semifinals)
4. (Germany) Timo Boll / (Germany) Patrick Franziska (semifinals)
5. (Hong Kong) Ho Kwan Kit / (Hong Kong) Wong Chun Ting (quarterfinals)
6. (Germany) Benedikt Duda / (Germany) Dang Qiu (quarterfinals)
7. (Chinese Taipei) Liao Cheng-ting / (Chinese Taipei) Lin Yun-ju (final)
8. (Chinese Taipei) Chen Chien-an / (Chinese Taipei) Chuang Chih-yuan (quarterfinals)

=== Draw ===
Quarterfinals
1 | (South Korea) Jeoung Young-sik (South Korea) Lee Sang-su | 8 | 11 | 7 | 1
7 | (Chinese Taipei) Liao Cheng-ting (Chinese Taipei) Lin Yun-ju | 11 | 7 | 11 | 11
6 | (Germany) Benedikt Duda (Germany) Dang Qiu | 11 | 10 | 5 | 11 | 9
4 | (Germany) Timo Boll (Germany) Patrick Franziska | 9 | 12 | 11 | 5 | 11
3 | (China) Liang Jingkun (China) Lin Gaoyuan | 11 | 5 | 13 | 11
8 | (Chinese Taipei) Chen Chien-an (Chinese Taipei) Chuang Chih-yuan | 9 | 11 | 11 | 7
5 | (Hong Kong) Ho Kwan Kit (Hong Kong) Wong Chun Ting | 7 | 5 | 3
2 | (China) Fan Zhendong (China) Xu Xin | 11 | 11 | 11

Semifinals
7 | (Chinese Taipei) Liao Cheng-ting (Chinese Taipei) Lin Yun-ju | 2 | 11 | 7 | 11 | 12
4 | (Germany) Timo Boll (Germany) Patrick Franziska | 11 | 8 | 11 | 5 | 10
3 | (China) Liang Jingkun (China) Lin Gaoyuan | 9 | 9 | 9
2 | (China) Fan Zhendong (China) Xu Xin | 11 | 11 | 11

Final
7 | (Chinese Taipei) Liao Cheng-ting (Chinese Taipei) Lin Yun-ju | 7 | 6 | 13 | 3
2 | (China) Fan Zhendong (China) Xu Xin | 11 | 11 | 11 | 11

== Women's doubles ==
=== Players ===
1. (Japan) Miyuu Kihara / (Japan) Miyu Nagasaki (champions)
2. (South Korea) Jeon Ji-hee / (South Korea) Yang Ha-eun (final)
3. (China) Sun Yingsha / (China) Wang Manyu (semifinals)
4. (Chinese Taipei) Chen Szu-yu / (Chinese Taipei) Cheng Hsien-tzu (semifinals)
5. (Japan) Miu Hirano / (Japan) Saki Shibata (quarterfinals)
6. (Slovakia) Barbora Balážová / (Czech Republic) Hana Matelová (quarterfinals)
7. (Hong Kong) Doo Hoi Kem / (Hong Kong) Lee Ho Ching (quarterfinals)
8. (Hong Kong) Ng Wing Nam / (Hong Kong) Soo Wai Yam Minnie (quarterfinals)

=== Draw ===
Quarterfinals
1 | (Japan) Miyuu Kihara (Japan) Miyu Nagasaki | 11 | 6 | 9 | 11 | 11
6 | (Slovakia) Barbora Balážová (Czech Republic) Hana Matelová | 9 | 11 | 11 | 6 | 4
8 | (Hong Kong) Ng Wing Nam (Hong Kong) Soo Wai Yam Minnie | 7 | 11 | 7
3 | (China) Sun Yingsha (China) Wang Manyu | 11 | 13 | 11
4 | (Chinese Taipei) Chen Szu-yu (Chinese Taipei) Cheng Hsien-tzu | 11 | 7 | 11 | 11
5 | (Japan) Miu Hirano (Japan) Saki Shibata | 9 | 11 | 6 | 9
7 | (Hong Kong) Doo Hoi Kem (Hong Kong) Lee Ho Ching | 9 | 9 | 11 | 4
2 | (South Korea) Jeon Ji-hee (South Korea) Yang Ha-eun | 11 | 11 | 5 | 11

Semifinals
1 | (Japan) Miyuu Kihara (Japan) Miyu Nagasaki | 3 | 4 | 11 | 14 | 14
3 | (China) Sun Yingsha (China) Wang Manyu | 11 | 11 | 3 | 12 | 12
4 | (Chinese Taipei) Chen Szu-yu (Chinese Taipei) Cheng Hsien-tzu | 11 | 3 | 6 | 8
2 | (South Korea) Jeon Ji-hee (South Korea) Yang Ha-eun | 8 | 11 | 11 | 11

Final
1 | (Japan) Miyuu Kihara (Japan) Miyu Nagasaki | 12 | 11 | 11
2 | (South Korea) Jeon Ji-hee (South Korea) Yang Ha-eun | 10 | 6 | 6

== Mixed doubles ==
=== Players ===
1. (Hong Kong) Wong Chun Ting / (Hong Kong) Doo Hoi Kem (semifinals)
2. (Chinese Taipei) Lin Yun-ju / (Chinese Taipei) Cheng I-ching (semifinals)
3. (China) Xu Xin / (China) Liu Shiwen (champions)
4. (Japan) Jun Mizutani / (Japan) Mima Ito (final)
5. (South Korea) Cho Dae-seong / (South Korea) Shin Yu-bin (quarterfinals)
6. (Slovakia) Ľubomír Pištej / (Slovakia) Barbora Balážová (quarterfinals)
7. (France) Tristan Flore / (France) Laura Gasnier (quarterfinals)
8. (Hungary) Adam Szudi / (Hungary) Szandra Pergel (quarterfinals)

=== Draw ===
Quarterfinals
1 | (Hong Kong) Wong Chun Ting (Hong Kong) Doo Hoi Kem | 12 | 11 | 11
6 | (Slovakia) Ľubomír Pištej (Slovakia) Barbora Balážová | 10 | 9 | 7
7 | (France) Tristan Flore (France) Laura Gasnier | 7 | 6 | 6
4 | (Japan) Jun Mizutani (Japan) Mima Ito | 11 | 11 | 11
3 | (China) Xu Xin (China) Liu Shiwen | 11 | 11 | 13
5 | (South Korea) Cho Dae-seong (South Korea) Shin Yu-bin | 3 | 5 | 11
8 | (Hungary) Adam Szudi (Hungary) Szandra Pergel | 7 | 3 | 4
2 | (Chinese Taipei) Lin Yun-ju (Chinese Taipei) Cheng I-ching | 11 | 11 | 11

Semifinals
1 | (Hong Kong) Wong Chun Ting (Hong Kong) Doo Hoi Kem | 9 | 2 | 13
4 | (Japan) Jun Mizutani (Japan) Mima Ito | 11 | 11 | 15
3 | (China) Xu Xin (China) Liu Shiwen | 11 | 13 | 11
2 | (Chinese Taipei) Lin Yun-ju (Chinese Taipei) Cheng I-ching | 3 | 11 | 1

Final
4 | (Japan) Jun Mizutani (Japan) Mima Ito | 11 | 11 | 3 | 8 | 9
3 | (China) Xu Xin (China) Liu Shiwen | 9 | 6 | 11 | 11 | 11

== ITTF Star Awards ==
The 2019 ITTF Star Awards ceremony was held at the JW Marriott Hotel in Zhengzhou on 11 December.

Awards were handed out in seven categories:

- Male Table Tennis Star: (China) Ma Long
- Female Table Tennis Star: (China) Liu Shiwen
- Male Para Table Tennis Star: (Germany) Thomas Schmidberger
- Female Para Table Tennis Star: (Italy) Giada Rossi
- Table Tennis Star Coach: (Puerto Rico) Bladimir Díaz
- Table Tennis Breakthrough Star: (United States) Lily Zhang
- Table Tennis Star Point: (China) Fan Zhendong & Xu Xin at the 2019 Japan Open

== See also ==
- 2019 World Table Tennis Championships
- 2019 ITTF Team World Cup
- 2019 ITTF Men's World Cup
- 2019 ITTF Women's World Cup
