= Table Tennis Victoria =

Table Tennis Victoria (TTV) is the State Sporting Organisation for the Sport of Table Tennis in Victoria.

TTV was formed in 1925.

It is affiliated with TTA (Table Tennis Australia), the ITTF (International Table Tennis Federation) and the OTTF (Oceania Table Tennis Federation).

TTV has over 4,500 registered members. Members have represented Australia in Olympic Games, Paralympic GamesCommonwealth Games, Able Bodied and Para World Championships, the World Cup and numerous other international competitions; including junior, youth and veteran levels. At the 2000 Sydney Olympic Games Victoria's Miao Miao earned fifth place and took Silver at the 2002 Manchester Commonwealth Games. While at the 2002 Manchester Commonwealth Games Jian Fang Lay captured two Silver and one Bronze medal for Australia. Jiang Fang Lay also combined with Miao Miao to win a Silver medal in the women's doubles and a Bronze medal in the women's teams event at the 2014 Commonwealth Games.

== Players ==
Women:

- Jian Fang Lay
- Stephanie Sang

Men:

- David Zalcberg
- Simon Gerada

== State Tournament Circuit ==
TTV sanctions multiple tournaments around Victoria throughout the year. There are Junior Tournaments, Senior Tournaments and Veteran Tournaments.

Junior Tournaments	Senior Tournaments	Veteran Tournaments
Under 17	Open Age	Over 30
Under 15	Under 19	Over 40
Under 13	Under 21	Over 50
Under 11	Over 30	Over 60
Divisions	Divisions	Over 65
		Over 70
		Over 75
		Over 80
		Over 85
		Divisions

Division Events are restricted by Rating Central points

Division	Points
Division 1	< 2000
Division 2	< 1700
Division 3	< 1400
Division 4	< 1200
Division 5	< 1000
Division 6	< 800

== Members Associations ==
- Albert Park Table Tennis Association
- Albury Wodonga Table Tennis Association
- Bairnsdale & District Table Tennis Association/KeenAgers
- Ballarat Table Tennis Association
- Balwyn United Table Tennis Club
- Bellarine Keenagers Table Tennis Club
- Bellarine Table Tennis Club
- Bendigo & District Table Tennis Association
- Benalla Table Tennis Club
- CH Table Tennis
- Coburg Table Tennis Club
- Croydon & Districts Table Tennis Association
- Daylesford Table Tennis Association
- Deniliquin Table Tennis Club
- Diamond Valley Table Tennis Association
- Eastern Suburbs & Churches Table Tennis Association
- Echuca Table Tennis Association
- Geelong Table Tennis Association
- Gisborne District Table Tennis Association
- Greater Dandenong Table Tennis Association
- Hamilton Table Tennis Association
- Horsham Table Tennis Association
- Kyabram Youth Club
- Lakes Entrance Keenagers
- Leongatha Table Tennis Association
- LOOPS powered by HWATT
- Maccabi Table Tennis Club (VIC)
- Manningham Table Tennis Association
- Melbourne Veterans Table Tennis Association
- Melton Table Tennis Association
- Miao’s Table Tennis Academy
- Moe/Newborough Keen-agers
- Monbulk Table Tennis Association
- Mornington Peninsula & Frankston City Table Tennis Association
- Officer City Soccer Club
- Orford & Districts Table Tennis Association
- Panda Table Tennis
- Peter's Table Tennis Academy
- Pinnacle Table Tennis Association
- Portland Table Tennis Association
- Sale Keenagers Table Tennis Club
- Scorpio Table Tennis Academy
- Shepparton Table Tennis Association
- Smash Sport Pty Ltd
- South Eastern Table Tennis Association
- St Johns Table Tennis Club
- St Kilda Cricket Club Table Tennis Club
- Sunbury & District Table Tennis Association
- Sunraysia Table Tennis Association
- Sunshine & District Table Tennis Association
- Swan Hill Table Tennis Association
- Tarneit Table Tennis Club
- Terang Table Tennis Association
- The Disruptor Club
- Traralgon Table Tennis Association
- Triangle Table Tennis
- Vietnamese Table Tennis Association
- Wangaratta Table Tennis Association
- Warracknabeal Table Tennis Association
- Warrnambool Table Tennis Association
- Werribee Table Tennis Association
- Western Table Tennis Club
- Wonthaggi Table Tennis Association
- Yarra Table Tennis Club
- Yarrawonga Mulwala Table Tennis Association

== See also ==
- TTV Super League
