= Kinoshita Abyell Kanagawa =

- Sport: Table Tennis
- Founded: 2018
- League: T.League
- Location: Kanagawa, Japan
- Colors: Blue, Red
- Head coach: Rui Nakazawa
- Divisions: T. Premier League
- Playoff berths: 2 2019, 2020
- Mascot: Eruru
- Main sponsor: Kinoshita Group

Uniforms
- Home Away

Kinoshita Abyell Kanagawa (木下アビエル神奈川) is a Japanese women's professional table tennis club based in Kanagawa Prefecture and playing in the T.League.

== Season-by-season records ==
Season	W	L	Rank	Notes
2018–19	18	3	1st	lost in playoff match vs Nihon Seimei Red Elf
2019–20	13	8	2nd	

== Current roster ==
Head coach: Rui Nakazawa

No.	Nationality	Player	T.League Rank	Style	Notes
#1	(Japan)	Miyuu Kihara	☆5	R Shakehand	
#6	(South Korea)	Lee Eun-hye	☆2	R Shakehand	
#7	(Japan)	Kasumi Ishikawa	☆5	L Shakehand	
#8	(Japan)	Rin Mende	☆	R Shakehand	
#9	(Japan)	Yuuka Umemura	☆	L Shakehand	
#11	(Japan)	Miyuu Nagasaki	☆3	L Shakehand	
#14	(Japan)	Miu Hirano	☆4	R Shakehand	
#16	(Japan)	Miwa Harimoto	☆2	R Shakehand	Tomokazu's sister
#23	(South Korea)	Joo Cheonhui	☆	R Shakehand	
#30	(South Korea)	Mirei Makino	☆	R Shakehand	
#66	(South Korea)	Hana Sakurai	☆	R Shakehand	
2022-23 Season

== Notable former players ==
- (China) Yuan Xuejiao (2018–19)
