= Table Tennis Australia =

Sports governing body in Australia

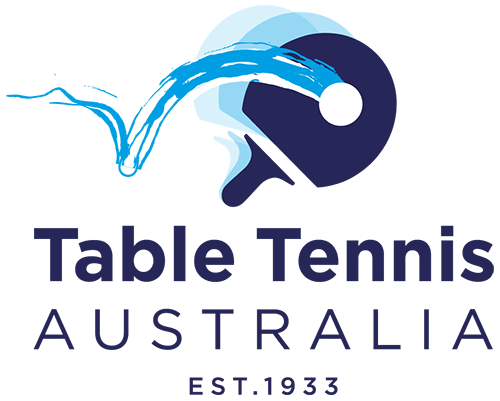
- Sport: Table tennis
- Jurisdiction: Australia
- Abbreviation: TTA
- Founded: 1933
- Affiliation: ITTF
- Affiliation date: 1936
- Regional affiliation: OTTF
- Headquarters: Melbourne, Victoria AUS
- Location: State Sports Centres - MSAC, 30 Aughtie Drive, Albert Park VIC 3206
- Chairperson: Graham Symons
- CEO: Nicole Adamson
- Coach: Ricardo Oliveira

Official website
- www.tabletennis.org.au
- (Australia)

Table Tennis Australia is the National Sporting Organisation for the Sport of Table Tennis in Australia and is affiliated with both the ITTF (International Table Tennis Federation) which oversees the international governance and development of Table Tennis and the OTTF (Oceania Table Tennis Federation) which oversees the sport development at a regional level.

== History ==
In 1923, the South Australian Table Tennis Association and the Queensland Association were formed. The Victorian Table Tennis Association began its operations in 1925 and New South Wales in 1930. Following interstate visits by these four associations, the Australian Board of Control was formed in 1933. In 1936, affiliation with the International Table Tennis Federation was made. In 1937, the Board of Control was reconstructed into the Australian Table Tennis Association. Table tennis on an organised basis came to a standstill because of World War II; however the game was played extensively in defence camps and for charitable purposes. To revive the game after the war, a special meeting was held in 1947, and the Constitution was revised and General Regulations were adopted. In 1994, the body took its current name of Table Tennis Australia Inc.

== State bodies ==
- Table Tennis New South Wales
- Table Tennis Victoria
- Table Tennis Queensland
- Table Tennis South Australia
- Western Australia Table Tennis Association
- Table Tennis Tasmania
- Table Tennis Northern Territory
- Table Tennis ACT

== National Championships ==
Each year there are a number of National Championships run by TTA for each Age Grouping

Junior	Youth	Senior	Veteran	Para
Under 17	Under 21	Open Age	Over 30	Class 1-11
Under 15	Under 19		Over 40	
Under 13			Over 50	
Under 11			Over 60	
			Over 65	
			Over 70	
			Over 75	
			Over 80	
			Over 85	
