= ITTF-Oceania Cup =

- Most recent season or competition: 2019 ITTF-Oceania Cup
- Sport: Table tennis
- Founded: 2007
- Singles entrants: 8 men; 8 women
- Confederation: Oceania Table Tennis Federation
- Most recent champions: Men: (Australia) Hu Heming; Women: (Australia) Jian Fang Lay

The ITTF-Oceania Cup is an annual table tennis event held by the International Table Tennis Federation (ITTF). The event features men's and women's singles tournaments, with the winners qualifying for the table tennis World Cup.

Since 2011, the event has also included the Pacific Cup, a separate tournament which excludes players from Australia and New Zealand.

== Champions ==
Year	Location	Oceania Cup		Pacific Cup	
Year	Location	Men's singles	Women's singles	Men's singles	Women's singles
2007	(New Zealand) Auckland	(Australia) William Henzell	(Australia) Miao Miao	Not contested	Not contested
2009	(Australia) Melbourne	(Australia) William Henzell	(Australia) Miao Miao	Not contested	Not contested
2011	(Australia) Adelaide	(Australia) William Henzell	(New Zealand) Karen Li	(New Caledonia) Laurent Sens	(New Caledonia) Ornella Bouteille
2012	(Fiji) Suva	(Australia) William Henzell	(New Zealand) Chunli Li	(Vanuatu) Yoshua Shing	(New Caledonia) Cathy Gauthier
2013	(Australia) Bendigo	(Australia) William Henzell	(Australia) Miao Miao	(Vanuatu) Yoshua Shing	(New Caledonia) Cathy Gauthier
2014	(Australia) Bendigo	(Australia) William Henzell	(Australia) Jian Fang Lay	(Vanuatu) Yoshua Shing	(New Caledonia) Cathy Gauthier
2015	(Australia) Bendigo	(Australia) William Henzell	(Australia) Jian Fang Lay	(New Caledonia) Laurent Sens	(New Caledonia) Ornella Bouteille
2016	(Australia) Melbourne	(Australia) David Powell	(Australia) Vivian Dederko	(Vanuatu) Yoshua Shing	(Fiji) Grace Yee
2017	(Fiji) Suva	(Australia) David Powell	(Australia) Jian Fang Lay	(Vanuatu) Yoshua Shing	(Fiji) Grace Yee
2018	(Vanuatu) Port Vila	(Australia) Hu Heming	(Australia) Jian Fang Lay	(Vanuatu) Yoshua Shing	(Fiji) Sally Yee
2019	(French Polynesia) Bora Bora	(Australia) Hu Heming	(Australia) Jian Fang Lay	(French Polynesia) Ocean Belrose	(Fiji) Sally Yee
2022	(Papua New Guinea) Port Moresby	(Australia) Nicholas Lum	(Australia) Minhyung Jee	(Papua New Guinea) Geoffrey Loi	(Fiji) Grace Yee
2023	(New Zealand) Hamilton	(Australia) Nicholas Lum	(Australia) Yangzi Liu	(French Polynesia) Ocean Belrose	(French Polynesia) Kelley Tehahetua
2024	(New Caledonia) Noumea	(Australia) Finn Luu	(Australia) Yangzi Liu	(New Caledonia) Jeremy Dey	(Vanuatu) Priscila Tommy
2025	(Australia) Melbourne	(Australia) Nicholas Lum	(Australia) Yangzi Liu		
2026	(New Zealand) Christchurch	(Australia) Finn Luu	(Australia) Yangzi Liu		

== See also ==
- Oceania Table Tennis Championships
