= 2019 ITTF-Oceania Cup =

Tournament details
- Dates: 25–26 May 2019
- Edition: 11th
- Location: Bora Bora, French Polynesia

Champions
- Men's singles: (Australia) Hu Heming
- Women's singles: (Australia) Jian Fang Lay

The 2019 ITTF-Oceania Cup was a table tennis event that took place from 25–26 May in Bora Bora, French Polynesia. The competition was organised by ITTF-Oceania, under the authority of the International Table Tennis Federation (ITTF). It was the 11th edition of the event, and the first time that it had been held in French Polynesia. Men's singles and women's singles competitions were held, with the winner of each event qualifying automatically for the 2019 Men's and Women's World Cups.

The ninth edition of the Pacific Cup was also held during the event, with players from Australia and New Zealand excluded from competing.

== Medallists ==
Event	Gold	Silver	Bronze
Men's singles	(Australia) Hu Heming	(Australia) Rohan Dhooria	(New Zealand) Nathan Xu
Women's singles	(Australia) Jian Fang Lay	(Australia) Parleen Kaur	(New Zealand) Zhou Jiayi

== Players ==
A total of 16 players were invited to compete: eight men and eight women.

Men's singles

- (Australia) Rohan Dhooria
- (Australia) Hu Heming
- (New Zealand) Dean Shu
- (New Zealand) Nathan Xu
- (French Polynesia) Ocean Belrose
- (Fiji) Vicky Wu
- (New Caledonia) Arthur Mas
- (Vanuatu) Yoshua Shing

Women's singles

- (Fiji) Sally Yee
- (Australia) Jian Fang Lay
- (Fiji) Grace Yee
- (French Polynesia) Melveen Richmond
- (Australia) Parleen Kaur
- (New Zealand) Cheng Zhiying
- (French Polynesia) Cyrine Sam
- (New Zealand) Zhou Jiayi

== Men's singles ==
=== Group stage ===
	Group 1	(Australia); Hu	(New Zealand); Shu	(French Polynesia); Belrose	(New Caledonia); Mas
1	(Australia) Hu Heming		4–0	4–1	4–0
2	(New Zealand) Dean Shu	0–4		4–3	4–0
3	(French Polynesia) Ocean Belrose	1–4	3–4		4–1
4	(New Caledonia) Arthur Mas	0–4	0–4	1–4	

	Group 2	(New Zealand); Xu	(Vanuatu); Shing	(Australia); Dhooria	(Fiji); Wu
1	(New Zealand) Nathan Xu		4–0	4–2	4–0
2	(Vanuatu) Yoshua Shing	0–4		4–1	4–0
3	(Australia) Rohan Dhooria	2–4	1–4		4–0
4	(Fiji) Vicky Wu	0–4	0–4	0–4	

=== Knockout stage ===
Quarterfinals
(Australia) Hu Heming
Bye
(French Polynesia) Ocean Belrose	8	11	11	11	11
(Vanuatu) Yoshua Shing	11	5	6	6	7
(New Zealand) Dean Shu	8	11	4	12	11	5
(Australia) Rohan Dhooria	11	5	11	10	13	11
Bye
(New Zealand) Nathan Xu

Semifinals
(Australia) Hu Heming	11	11	11	11
(French Polynesia) Ocean Belrose	6	8	5	3
(Australia) Rohan Dhooria	11	9	11	11	11
(New Zealand) Nathan Xu	4	11	8	7	5

Final
(Australia) Hu Heming	11	6	5	11	11	11
(Australia) Rohan Dhooria	6	11	11	8	6	8
Third place
(French Polynesia) Ocean Belrose	3	8	7	11	11	2
(New Zealand) Nathan Xu	11	11	11	9	8	11

== Women's singles ==
=== Group stage ===
	Group 1	(Australia); Lay	(New Zealand); Cheng	(Fiji); Yee	(French Polynesia); Sam
1	(Australia) Jian Fang Lay		4–0	4–0	4–0
2	(New Zealand) Cheng Zhiying	0–4		4–3	4–1
3	(Fiji) Grace Yee	0–4	3–4		4–3
4	(French Polynesia) Cyrine Sam	0–4	1–4	3–4	

	Group 2	(Australia); Kaur	(New Zealand); Zhou	(French Polynesia); Richmond	(Fiji) Yee
1	(Australia) Parleen Kaur		4–0	4–1	4–1
2	(New Zealand) Zhou Jiayi	0–4		4–2	4–1
3	(French Polynesia) Melveen Richmond	1–4	2–4		4–1
4	(Fiji) Sally Yee	1–4	1–4	1–4	

=== Knockout stage ===
Quarterfinals
(Australia) Jian Fang Lay
Bye
(Fiji) Grace Yee	3	5	8	10
(New Zealand) Zhou Jiayi	11	11	11	12
(New Zealand) Cheng Zhiying	11	11	11	11
(French Polynesia) Melveen Richmond	6	9	8	7
Bye
(Australia) Parleen Kaur

Semifinals
(Australia) Jian Fang Lay	11	11	11	11
(New Zealand) Zhou Jiayi	3	3	1	8
(New Zealand) Cheng Zhiying	8	12	8	6	7
(Australia) Parleen Kaur	11	10	11	11	11

Final
(Australia) Jian Fang Lay	11	11	11	11
(Australia) Parleen Kaur	6	5	5	5
Third place
(New Zealand) Zhou Jiayi	5	11	11	8	11	11
(New Zealand) Cheng Zhiying	11	7	6	11	6	4

== Pacific Cup ==
=== Men ===
Semifinals						Final
1	(Vanuatu) Yoshua Shing	13	11	11	11
4	(New Caledonia) Arthur Mas	11	5	7	6	(Vanuatu) Yoshua Shing	11	6	8	8	8
3	(Fiji) Vicky Wu	10	7	9	4	(French Polynesia) Ocean Belrose	3	11	11	11	11
2	(French Polynesia) Ocean Belrose	12	11	11	11

=== Women ===
Semifinals								Final
1	(Fiji) Sally Yee	11	11	11	8	11
4	(French Polynesia) Melveen Richmond	9	5	8	11	6		(Fiji) Sally Yee	11	11	11	11	15
3	(French Polynesia) Cyrine Sam	11	9	10	6	13	10	(Fiji) Grace Yee	8	13	7	9	13
2	(Fiji) Grace Yee	9	11	12	11	11	12

== See also ==
- 2019 Europe Top 16 Cup
- 2019 ITTF-ATTU Asian Cup
- 2019 ITTF Pan-America Cup
