= Miu Hirano =

Japanese table tennis player

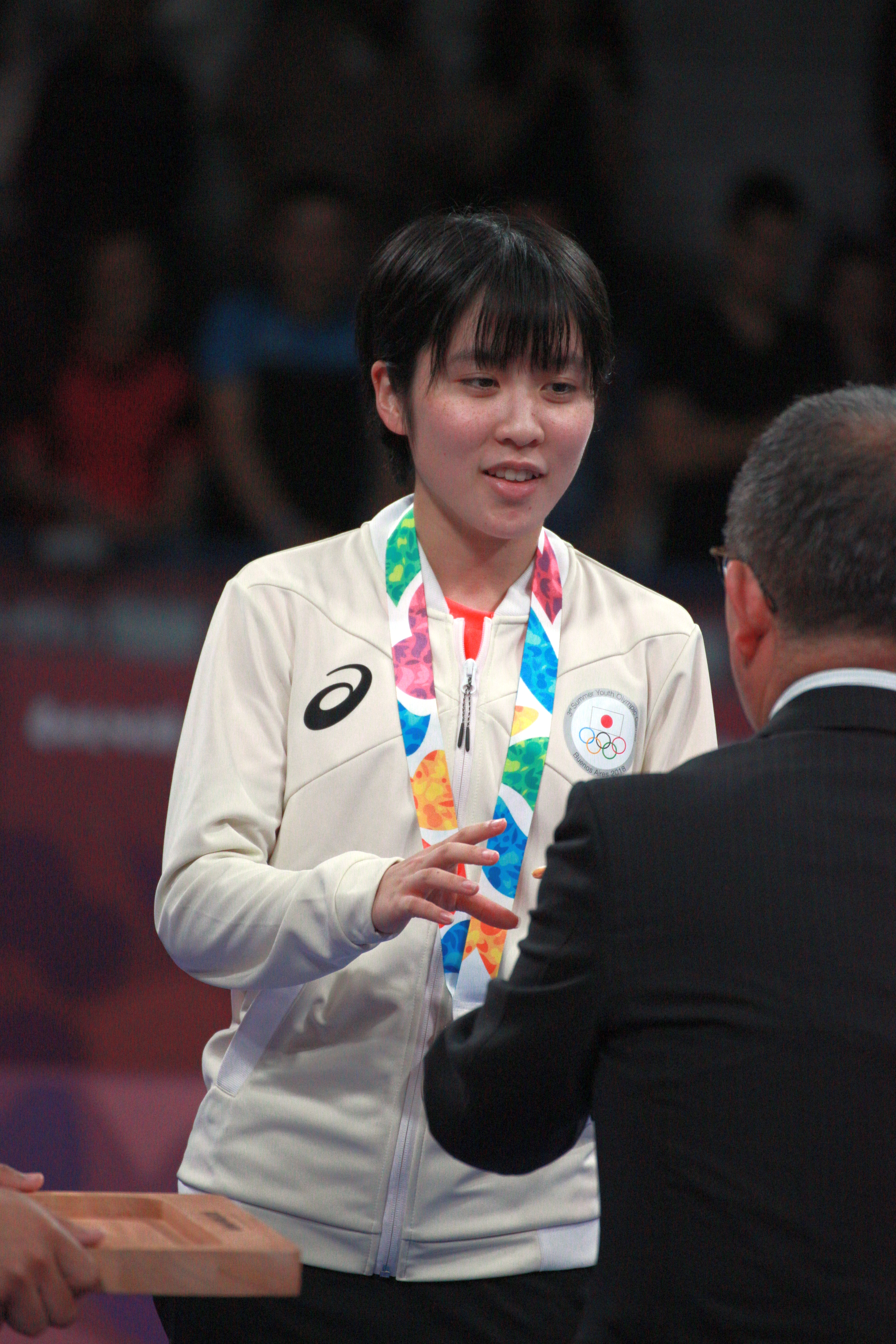
- Hirano at the 2018 Summer Youth Olympics

Personal information
- Born: 14 April 2000 (age 26) Numazu, Japan
- Height: 1.58 m (5 ft 2 in)

Sport
- Sport: Table tennis
- Club: Kinoshita Abyell Kanagawa (T.League)
- Playing style: Right-handed, shakehand grip, counter driver
- Equipment: Butterfly Viscaria FL (blade), Butterfly Tenergy 05 Hard (FH, black), Butterfly Tenergy 05 (BH, red)
- Highest ranking: 5 (28 September 2026)
- Current ranking: 26 (21 September 2026)
Medal record
Women's table tennis
Representing Japan
Olympic Games
Silver medal – second place	2020 Tokyo	Team
Silver medal – second place	2024 Paris	Team
World Championships
Silver medal – second place	2018 Halmstad	Team
Silver medal – second place	2024 Busan	Team
Bronze medal – third place	2017 Düsseldorf	Singles
World Cup
Gold medal – first place	2016 Philadelphia	Singles
Silver medal – second place	2018 London	Team
Silver medal – second place	2019 Tokyo	Team
Bronze medal – third place	2023 Chengdu	Mixed team
Asian Games
Silver medal – second place	2014 Incheon	Team
Silver medal – second place	2022 Hangzhou	Team
Asian Championships
Gold medal – first place	2017 Wuxi	Singles
Gold medal – first place	2024 Astana	Team
Silver medal – second place	2015 Pattaya	Doubles
Silver medal – second place	2015 Pattaya	Team
Silver medal – second place	2017 Wuxi	Team
Silver medal – second place	2019 Yogyakarta	Team
Bronze medal – third place	2019 Yogyakarta	Doubles
Bronze medal – third place	2023 Pyeongchang	Team

Miu Hirano (平野 美宇, Hirano Miu) (born 14 April 2000) is a Japanese table tennis player. In 2016, she won the Women's World Cup, becoming the youngest winner in the tournament's history and the first non-Chinese woman to win this tournament. She also won the women's singles title at the 2017 Asian Table Tennis Championships after defeating three top-ranked Chinese players. Hirano competed in the 2020 and 2024 Summer Olympics, earning silver medals in the women's team event at both games.

== Career ==
=== 2014–2015 ===
In March 2014, she and Mima Ito won their first doubles title at the ITTF World Tour German Open. They became the youngest ever winners of the doubles competition on the ITTF World Tour. She was part of the Japanese team at the 2014 Asian Games, but lost to China in the final.

In April 2014 she won her second doubles title with Mima Ito at the ITTF World Tour Spanish Open.

In December 2014, she won the doubles title with Mima Ito at the ITTF World Tour Grand Finals in Bangkok. The pair defeated the Singapore pair of Feng Tianwei and Yu Mengyu in the semi-finals and Poland pair of Katarzyna Grzybowska and Natalia Partyka in the final.

On 5 July 2015, Miu Hirano and Mima Ito won the Women's Doubles title at the ITTF World Tour Korean Open. This was their third doubles title since 2014.

=== 2016 ===
In April 2016, she won her first women's singles title at the ITTF World Tour Polish Open by defeating Yu Mengyu in the final.

On 9 October 2016, in the absence of Chinese players, she seized the opportunity to win the Women's World Cup in Philadelphia. She defeated Mima Ito in the quarterfinals, Feng Tianwei in the semi-finals, and Cheng I-ching in the final. This marked her the youngest Women's World Cup champion and the first non-Chinese player to win the title.

=== 2017 ===
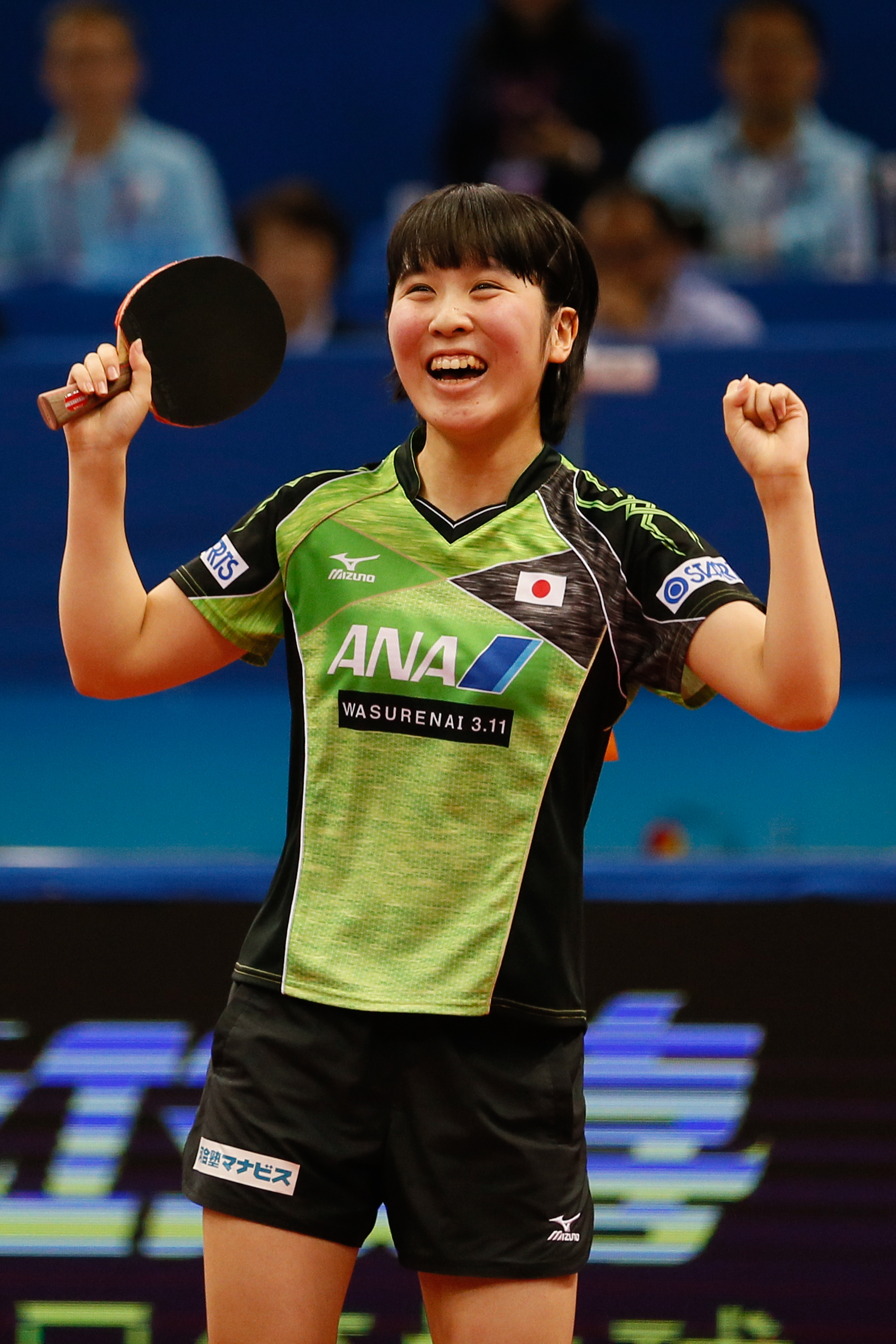
Hirano celebrating her victory at the 2017 Asian Championships

On 22 January 2017, she won the All Japan Championships by defeating Kasumi Ishikawa 4–2 in the final at the Tokyo Metropolitan Gymnasium.

On 14 April 2017, she defeated the world No. 1 player, Ding Ning, at the 2017 Asian Table Tennis Championships. The following day, she defeated the world No. 2 Zhu Yuling in the semi-finals and world No. 5 Chen Meng in the final, setting a new record as the youngest-ever winner of the Asian Championships singles event. She became the third non-Chinese player—and the first since Chire Koyama in 1996—to win the title.

At the 2017 World Table Tennis Championships in Düsseldorf, Hirano progressed to the singles semi-finals before losing to Ding Ning. By reaching the final four, she secured a bronze medal, ending a 48-year medal drought for Japan in women's singles since Toshiko Kowada won gold at the 1969 World Championships.

=== 2018–2021 ===
Hirano represented Japan at the 2020 Summer Olympics in the team event, though she did not compete in the singles event. In March, Hirano played in the WTT Doha, but suffered disappointing upsets in both the WTT Contender and WTT Star Contender events, including a loss to Shin Yu-bin in a potential Olympic team preview.

Hirano won silver in the team event at the Tokyo Olympics.

=== 2022–2024 ===
Hirano saw a significant resurgence in the cycle leading to the 2024 Summer Olympics. In July 2023, she won the WTT Contender Zagreb, notably defeating world No. 1 Sun Yingsha in the final. This victory reaffirmed her status as a top-tier threat to the Chinese national team.

At the 2024 Summer Olympics, Hirano competed in both singles and the team event. In the singles competition, she reached the quarterfinals, where she lost a close seven-game match to South Korea's Shin Yu-bin after nearly overcoming a 3–0 deficit. In the women's team event, Hirano, Hina Hayata, and Miwa Harimoto led Japan to its second consecutive Olympic silver medal. Later in 2024, she contributed to Japan's historic gold medal victory in the women's team event at the Asian Championships.

== Teams ==
Teams joined in T.League:

- Nissay Red Elf (2018–2022)
- Kinoshita Abyell Kanagawa (2022–)

== Awards ==
- 2016: ITTF Breakthrough Star of the Year

== Records ==
- World Cup Women's singles the youngest Champion
- Asian Championship Women's singles the youngest Champion

== In popular culture ==
Hirano made her acting debut in the 2018 Fuji TV drama The Confidence Man JP.

== Performance timeline ==
Key
W	F	SF	QF	#R	RR

(W) won; (F) finalist; (SF) semi-finalist, rank added if bronze medal match played; (QF) quarter-finalist; (#R) rounds 4, 3, 2, 1; (RR) round-robin stage
(S) singles event; (D) women's doubles event; (T) team event

Tournament		2014	2015	2016	2017	2018	2019	2020	2021	2022	2023	2024	2025
World Championships	S		3R		SF		3R		4R		4R		2R
World Championships	D		2R		3R				QF				
World Championships	T					F						F	
Olympic Games	S											QF	
Olympic Games	T								F			F	
World Cup	S			W	SF4	QF	1R					QF	
World Cup	T					F	F				3rd		
ITTF Finals / WTT Finals	S			SF	1R	1R	1R		1R			QF	
ITTF Finals / WTT Finals	D	W	F				QF						
Asian Games	S										3R		
Asian Games	D										2R		
Asian Games	T	F									F		
Asian Championships	S		4R		W		QF				4R	3R	
Asian Championships	D		F				SF				QF		
Asian Championships	T		F		F		F				SF	W	
Asian Cup	S			QF	SF4	QF	QF						RR
Year-end ranking		2014	2015	2016	2017	2018	2019	2020	2021	2022	2023	2024	2025
Year-end ranking		42	16	11	6	9	11	11	14	22	17	13	63

== Finals ==
=== Women's singles ===
Result	Year	Tournament	Opponent	Score	Ref
Runner-up	2014	ITTF World Tour, Spanish Open	(Sweden) Li Fen	1–4	
Winner	2016	ITTF World Tour, Polish Open	(Singapore) Yu Mengyu	4–0	
Runner-up	2016	ITTF World Tour, Croatia Open	(Japan) Hitomi Sato	1–4	
Winner	2016	World Cup	(Chinese Taipei) Cheng I-ching	4–0	
Winner	2017	Asian Championships	(China) Chen Meng	3–0	
Runner-up	2019	ITTF World Tour, Czech Open	(China) Chen Xingtong	3–4	
Runner-up	2019	ITTF Challenge Plus, Canada Open	(Japan) Kasumi Ishikawa	2–4	
Runner-up	2022	WTT Contender Zagreb	(Japan) Mima Ito	2–4	
Winner	2022	WTT Feeder Otocec	(Japan) Haruna Ojio	4–1	
Winner	2023	WTT Contender Zagreb	(China) Sun Yingsha	4–3	
Runner-up	2026	WTT Star Contender Chennai	(Japan) Satsuki Odo	0–4	
Winner	2026	WTT Contender Almaty	(Japan) Hina Hayata	4–1	

=== Women's doubles ===
Result	Year	Tournament	Partner	Opponents	Score	Ref
Winner	2014	ITTF World Tour, German Open	Mima Ito	(Poland) Katarzyna Grzybowska / Natalia Partyka	3–0	
Winner	2014	ITTF World Tour, Spanish Open	Mima Ito	(Austria) Liu Jia / (Czech Republic) Iveta Vacenovská	3–2	
Runner-up	2014	ITTF World Tour, Korea Open	Mima Ito	(China) Chen Ke / Wang Manyu	0–3	
Winner	2014	ITTF World Tour Grand Finals	Mima Ito	(Poland) Katarzyna Grzybowska / Natalia Partyka	4–0	
Runner-up	2015	ITTF World Tour, Spanish Open	Mima Ito	(Japan) Ai Fukuhara / Misako Wakamiya	2–3	
Winner	2015	ITTF World Tour, Korea Open	Mima Ito	(Japan) Hina Hayata / Hitomi Sato	3–2	
Runner-up	2015	Asian Championships	Mima Ito	(North Korea) Kim Hye-sung / Ri Mi-gyong	0–4	
Runner-up	2015	ITTF World Tour Grand Finals	Mima Ito	(China) Ding Ning / Zhu Yuling	0–4	
Winner	2017	ITTF World Tour, German Open	Hina Hayata	(Chinese Taipei) Chen Szu-yu / Cheng I-ching	3–0	
Runner-up	2019	ITTF World Tour, Bulgarian Open	Saki Shibata	(China) Gu Yuting / Mu Zi	0–3	
Runner-up	2019	ITTF World Tour, Czech Open	Saki Shibata	(China) Gu Yuting / Mu Zi	1–3	
Runner-up	2019	ITTF World Tour, Swedish Open	Kasumi Ishikawa	(China) Chen Meng / Ding Ning	1–3	
Runner-up	2020	ITTF World Tour Platinum, German Open	Kasumi Ishikawa	(China) Chen Meng / Wang Manyu	1–3	
Winner	2020	ITTF World Tour, Hungarian Open	Kasumi Ishikawa	(Hong Kong) Doo Hoi Kem / Lee Ho Ching	3–0	
Winner	2021	WTT Contender Doha	Kasumi Ishikawa	(Chinese Taipei) Cheng Hsien-tzu / Chen Szu-yu	3–0	
Runner-up	2021	WTT Star Contender Doha	Kasumi Ishikawa	(South Korea) Shin Yu-bin / Jeon Ji-hee	0–3	
Winner	2022	WTT Contender Almaty	Hina Hayata	(South Korea) Choi Hyo-joo / Shin Yu-bin	3–0	
Winner	2026	WTT Contender Almaty	Miyuu Kihara	(India) Syndrela Das / Sutirtha Mukherjee	3–0	
Winner	2026	WTT Contender Panagyurishte	Miyuu Kihara	(Italy) Nicole Arlia / Gaia Monfardini	3–0	
Winner	2026	WTT Star Contender Astana	Miyuu Kihara	(Japan) Honoka Hashimoto / (Puerto Rico) Adriana Díaz	3–1	
