= 2019 ITTF Pan-America Cup =

Tournament details
- Dates: 1–3 February 2019
- Edition: 3rd
- Total prize money: US$16,000
- Venue: Mario Morales Coliseum
- Location: Guaynabo, Puerto Rico

Champions
- Men's singles: (Brazil) Hugo Calderano
- Women's singles: (Puerto Rico) Adriana Díaz

The 2019 ITTF Pan-America Cup was a table tennis competition that took place from 1–3 February in Guaynabo, Puerto Rico, organised under the authority of the International Table Tennis Federation (ITTF).

Men's singles and women's singles events were held. Brazil's Hugo Calderano retained the men's singles title he won for the first time in 2018, while Adriana Díaz of Puerto Rico won the women's singles title for the first time. The winners and runners-up in each event qualified automatically for the 2019 Men's and Women's World Cups.

== Medalists ==
Event	Gold	Silver	Bronze
Men's singles	(Brazil) Hugo Calderano	(United States) Kanak Jha	(Brazil) Gustavo Tsuboi
Women's singles	(Puerto Rico) Adriana Díaz	(Canada) Zhang Mo	(United States) Yue Wu

== Men's singles ==
=== Seeding ===
Players were seeded according to the February 2019 ITTF World Ranking.

1. (Brazil) Hugo Calderano (champion)
2. (Brazil) Gustavo Tsuboi (bronze medalist)
3. (United States) Kanak Jha (final)
4. (Paraguay) Marcelo Aguirre (semifinals)
5. (Mexico) Marcos Madrid (group stage)
6. (Ecuador) Alberto Miño (quarterfinals)
7. (Puerto Rico) Brian Afanador (quarterfinals)
8. (Chile) Gustavo Gomez (group stage)
9. (Chile) Juan Lamadrid (group stage)
10. (Dominican Republic) Emil Santos (group stage)
11. (Puerto Rico) Daniel González (group stage)
12. (Dominican Republic) Samuel Gálvez (group stage)
13. (Canada) Marko Medjugorac (group stage)
14. (Guatemala) Allan Gutiérrez (group stage)
15. (United States) Nikhil Kumar (quarterfinals)
16. (Canada) Jeremy Hazin (quarterfinals)

=== Group stage ===
The preliminary group stage took place on 1 February. The winner of each group advanced to the main draw.

	Group 1	(United States) Kumar	(Mexico) Madrid	(Dominican Republic) Santos	Points
15	(United States) Nikhil Kumar		4–3	4–0	4
5	(Mexico) Marcos Madrid	3–4		4–0	3
10	(Dominican Republic) Emil Santos	0–4	0–4		2

	Group 2	(Ecuador) Miño	(Dominican Republic) Gálvez	(Guatemala) Gutiérrez	Points
6	(Ecuador) Alberto Miño		4–3	4–2	4
12	(Dominican Republic) Samuel Gálvez	3–4		4–3	3
14	(Guatemala) Allan Gutiérrez	2–4	3–4		2

	Group 3	(Puerto Rico) Afanador	(Canada) Medjugorac	(Chile) Lamadrid	Points
7	(Puerto Rico) Brian Afanador		4–0	4–1	4
13	(Canada) M. Medjugorac	0–4		4–0	3
9	(Chile) Juan Lamadrid	1–4	0–4		2

	Group 4	(Canada) Hazin	(Chile) Gomez	(Puerto Rico) González	Points
16	(Canada) Jeremy Hazin		4–0	4–0	4
8	(Chile) Gustavo Gomez	0–4		4–2	3
11	(Puerto Rico) Daniel González	0–4	2–4		2

=== Main draw ===
The main draw took place from 2–3 February.

Quarterfinals
1	(Brazil) Hugo Calderano	11	11	11	11
7	(Puerto Rico) Brian Afanador	9	4	9	9
15	(United States) Nikhil Kumar	7	11	9	8	8
4	(Paraguay) Marcelo Aguirre	11	5	11	11	11
3	(United States) Kanak Jha	9	9	11	8	11	11	11
6	(Ecuador) Alberto Miño	11	11	7	11	4	6	6
16	(Canada) Jeremy Hazin	8	11	10	7	7
2	(Brazil) Gustavo Tsuboi	11	8	12	11	11

Semifinals
1	(Brazil) Hugo Calderano	11	7	9	13	11	13
4	(Paraguay) Marcelo Aguirre	7	11	11	11	9	11
3	(United States) Kanak Jha	8	11	11	11	9	11
2	(Brazil) Gustavo Tsuboi	11	5	9	4	11	8

Final
1	(Brazil) Hugo Calderano	11	12	11	11	12
3	(United States) Kanak Jha	2	14	3	8	10
Third place
4	(Paraguay) Marcelo Aguirre	6	6	11	3	5
2	(Brazil) Gustavo Tsuboi	11	11	3	11	11

== Women's singles ==
=== Seeding ===
Players were seeded according to the February 2019 ITTF World Ranking.

1. (Canada) Zhang Mo (final)
2. (Puerto Rico) Adriana Díaz (champion)
3. (United States) Yue Wu (bronze medalist)
4. (Brazil) Bruna Takahashi (semifinals)
5. (United States) Lily Zhang (quarterfinals)
6. (Brazil) Gui Lin (quarterfinals)
7. (Chile) Paulina Vega (group stage)
8. (Puerto Rico) Melanie Díaz (group stage)
9. (Mexico) Yadira Silva (quarterfinals)
10. (Guatemala) Mabelyn Enríquez (group stage)
11. (Dominican Republic) Eva Brito (group stage)
12. (Dominican Republic) Yasiris Ortiz (group stage)
13. (Chile) Judith Morales (group stage)
14. (Canada) Alicia Côté (quarterfinals)
15. (Guatemala) Lucía Cordero (group stage)
16. (El Salvador) Estefanía Ramirios (group stage)

=== Group stage ===
The preliminary group stage took place on 1 February. The winner of each group advanced to the main draw.

=== Main draw ===
The main draw takes place from 2–3 February.

Quarterfinals
1	(Canada) Zhang Mo	11	8	14	11	9	10	11
5	(United States) Lily Zhang	9	11	12	8	11	12	6
9	(Mexico) Yadira Silva	7	6	9	11	11	8
4	(Brazil) Bruna Takahashi	11	11	11	9	5	11
3	(United States) Yue Wu	11	12	11	11
6	(Brazil) Gui Lin	4	10	2	8
14	(Canada) Alicia Côté	9	8	2	10
2	(Puerto Rico) Adriana Díaz	11	11	11	12

Semifinals
1	(Canada) Zhang Mo	11	11	11	11
4	(Brazil) Bruna Takahashi	8	4	5	5
3	(United States) Yue Wu	8	3	11	11	3	11	4
2	(Puerto Rico) Adriana Díaz	11	11	7	7	11	5	11

Final
1	(Canada) Zhang Mo	11	8	11	9	9
2	(Puerto Rico) Adriana Díaz	13	11	6	11	11
Third place
4	(Brazil) Bruna Takahashi	8	11	11	5	6	10
3	(United States) Yue Wu	11	6	9	11	11	12

== See also ==
- 2019 Pan American Table Tennis Championships
- 2019 ITTF-ATTU Asian Cup
- 2019 Europe Top 16 Cup
- 2019 ITTF-Oceania Cup
