= 2019 ITTF-ATTU Asian Cup =

Table tennis competition in Yokohama, Japan

Tournament details
- Dates: 5–7 April 2019
- Edition: 32nd
- Total prize money: US$100,000
- Venue: Yokohama Cultural Gymnasium
- Location: Yokohama, Japan

Champions
- Men's singles: (China) Fan Zhendong
- Women's singles: (China) Zhu Yuling

The 2019 ITTF-ATTU Asian Cup (also known as the 2019 Lion ITTF-ATTU Asian Cup for sponsorship reasons) was a table tennis competition that took place from 5–7 April in Yokohama, Japan. The event was organised by the Japan Table Tennis Association (JTTA), under the authority of the International Table Tennis Federation (ITTF) and the Asian Table Tennis Union (ATTU). It was the 32nd edition of the event, and the fourth time that it had been held in Japan.

Men's singles and women's singles events were held, and the three medallists in each event qualified automatically for the 2019 Men's and Women's World Cups.

== Medalists ==
Event	Gold	Silver	Bronze
Men's Singles	(China) Fan Zhendong	(China) Ma Long	(Japan) Koki Niwa
Women's Singles	(China) Zhu Yuling	(China) Chen Meng	(Japan) Kasumi Ishikawa

== Qualification ==
In both the men's and women's singles events, the reigning Asian Champion and Asian Cup Champion have been invited to take part, along with the 10 highest-ranked Asian players in the January 2019 ITTF World Ranking. The final four places were awarded to regional representatives from Middle Asia, South Asia, Southeast Asia and West Asia. Qualification was subject to a maximum of two players from any association.

Men's singles

Player	Qualification
Fan Zhendong (CHN)	2018 Asian Cup & 2017 Asian Champion
Ma Long (CHN)	WR 12
Tomokazu Harimoto (JPN)	WR 3
Lee Sang-su (KOR)	WR 7
Wong Chun Ting (HKG)	WR 8
Koki Niwa (JPN)	WR 9
Jang Woo-jin (KOR)	WR 11
Chuang Chih-yuan (TPE)	WR 19
Lin Yun-ju (TPE)	WR 28
Sharath Kamal (IND)	WR 30
Sathiyan Gnanasekaran (IND)	WR 31
Kirill Gerassimenko (KAZ)	WR 43
Nima Alamian (IRI)	Middle Asia Rep. (WR 67)
Imesh Ranasingha (SRI)	South Asia Rep. (WR 365)
Supanut Wisutmaythangkoon (THA)	Southeast Asia Rep. (WR 112)
Mohammed Abdulwahhab (QAT)	West Asia Rep. (WR 270)

Women's singles

Player	Qualification
Zhu Yuling (CHN)	2018 Asian Cup Champion
Miu Hirano (JPN)	2017 Asian Champion
Chen Meng (CHN)	WR 4
Kasumi Ishikawa (JPN)	WR 3
Cheng I-ching (TPE)	WR 8
Feng Tianwei (SGP)	WR 10
Seo Hyo-won (KOR)	WR 11
Doo Hoi Kem (HKG)	WR 14
Jeon Ji-hee (KOR)	WR 18
Chen Szu-yu (TPE)	WR 25
Lee Ho Ching (HKG)	WR 28
Suthasini Sawettabut (THA)	WR 34
Manika Batra (IND)	South Asia Rep. (WR 51)
Mahshid Ashtari (IRI)	Middle Asia Rep. (WR 176)
Lin Ye (SGP)	Southeast Asia Rep. (WR 53)
Maha Faramarzi (QAT)	West Asia Rep. (WR 467)

== Format ==
The first stage of both the men's and women's singles competitions consisted of four groups playing a round robin system, where each player played the other players in their group once. The top two players in Groups A, B and C qualified directly to the second stage. The third player from Groups A, B and C joined the winner of Group D in play-off matches to decide the final two places in the second stage.

The second stage consisted of a single knockout draw to decide the top eight positions.

== Men's singles ==
=== Seeding ===
Players were seeded according to the April 2019 ITTF World Ranking.

1. (China) Fan Zhendong
2. (Japan) Tomokazu Harimoto
3. (South Korea) Lee Sang-su
4. (Japan) Koki Niwa
5. (South Korea) Jang Woo-jin
6. (China) Ma Long
7. (Hong Kong) Wong Chun Ting
8. (Chinese Taipei) Chuang Chih-yuan
9. (Chinese Taipei) Lin Yun-ju
10. (India) Sathiyan Gnanasekaran
11. (India) Sharath Kamal
12. (Kazakhstan) Kirill Gerassimenko
13. (Iran) Nima Alamian
14. (Thailand) Supanut Wisutmaythangkoon
15. (Qatar) Mohammed Abdulwahhab
16. (Sri Lanka) Imesh Ranasingha

=== Group stage ===
The group stage took place on 5 April.

Group A

Pos.	Player	(China); Fan	(Hong Kong); Wong	(Kazakhstan); Gerassimenko	(South Korea); Jang	Points	Qualification
1	(China) Fan Zhendong	—	3–0	3–1	3–1	6	Advance to second stage
2	(Hong Kong) Wong Chun Ting	0–3	—	3–1	3–1	5	Advance to second stage
3	(Kazakhstan) Kirill Gerassimenko	1–3	1–3	—	3–2	4	Advance to play-off
4	(South Korea) Jang Woo-jin	1–3	1–3	2–3	—	3	

Group B

Pos.	Player	(China); Ma	(Japan); Harimoto	(Chinese Taipei); Lin	(India); Kamal	Points	Qualification
1	(China) Ma Long	—	3–1	3–1	3–0	6	Advance to second stage
2	(Japan) Tomokazu Harimoto	1–3	—	3–1	3–2	5	Advance to second stage
3	(Chinese Taipei) Lin Yun-ju	1–3	1–3	—	3–1	4	Advance to play-off
4	(India) Sharath Kamal	0–3	2–3	1–3	—	3	

Group C

Pos.	Player	(Japan); Niwa	(South Korea); Lee	(India); Gnanasekaran	(Chinese Taipei); Chuang	Points	Qualification
1	(Japan) Koki Niwa	—	3–1	3–1	0–3	5	Advance to second stage
2	(South Korea) Lee Sang-su	1–3	—	3–1	3–1	5	Advance to second stage
3	(India) Sathiyan Gnanasekaran	1–3	1–3	—	3–0	4	Advance to play-off
4	(Chinese Taipei) Chuang Chih-yuan	3–0	1–3	0–3	—	4	

Group D

Pos.	Player	(Thailand); Wisutmaythangkoon	(Iran); Alamian	(Qatar); Abdulwahhab	(Sri Lanka); Ranasingha	Points	Qualification
1	(Thailand) Supanut Wisutmaythangkoon	—	3–1	3–1	3–0 (w/o)	6	Advance to play-off
2	(Iran) Nima Alamian	1–3	—	3–0	3–0 (w/o)	5	
3	(Qatar) Mohammed Abdulwahhab	1–3	0–3	—	3–0 (w/o)	4	
4	(Sri Lanka) Imesh Ranasingha	0–3 (w/o)	0–3 (w/o)	0–3 (w/o)	—	3	

Play-offs

Play-offs
(Thailand) Supanut Wisutmaythangkoon	0
(Chinese Taipei) Lin Yun-ju	3
(Kazakhstan) Kirill Gerassimenko	1
(India) Sathiyan Gnanasekaran	3

=== Main draw ===
The main draw took place on 6 and 7 April.

Quarterfinals
(China) Fan Zhendong	11	11	11	8	11
(Chinese Taipei) Lin Yun-ju	9	7	8	11	8
(Japan) Tomokazu Harimoto	11	11	7	11	11
(South Korea) Lee Sang-su	6	7	11	5	9
(Japan) Koki Niwa	12	6	11	12	12
(Hong Kong) Wong Chun Ting	10	11	9	10	10
(India) Sathiyan Gnanasekaran	5	5	11	6	3
(China) Ma Long	11	11	6	11	11

Semifinals
(China) Fan Zhendong	6	11	11	11	11
(Japan) Tomokazu Harimoto	11	6	8	9	4
(Japan) Koki Niwa	5	6	8	6
(China) Ma Long	11	11	11	11

Final
(China) Fan Zhendong	9	12	9	11	11	12
(China) Ma Long	11	10	11	7	8	10
Third place
(Japan) Tomokazu Harimoto	7	3	11	5	11	8
(Japan) Koki Niwa	11	11	3	11	9	11

5th-8th place play-off

Play-off
(Chinese Taipei) Lin Yun-ju	6	11	7	11	11	9	11
(South Korea) Lee Sang-su	11	8	11	7	4	11	7
(Hong Kong) Wong Chun Ting	10	12	5	6	8
(India) Sathiyan Gnanasekaran	12	10	11	11	11

Fifth place
(Chinese Taipei) Lin Yun-ju	11	11	11	14
(India) Sathiyan Gnanasekaran	4	8	8	12
Seventh place
(South Korea) Lee Sang-su	11	11	5	11	6	11
(Hong Kong) Wong Chun Ting	9	7	11	3	11	7

== Women's singles ==
=== Seeding ===
Players were seeded according to the April 2019 ITTF World Ranking.

1. (China) Zhu Yuling
2. (China) Chen Meng
3. (Japan) Kasumi Ishikawa
4. (Chinese Taipei) Cheng I-ching
5. (Japan) Miu Hirano
6. (Singapore) Feng Tianwei
7. (South Korea) Suh Hyowon
8. (Hong Kong) Doo Hoi Kem
9. (South Korea) Jeon Ji-hee
10. (Chinese Taipei) Chen Szu-yu
11. (Thailand) Suthasini Sawettabut
12. (Hong Kong) Lee Ho Ching
13. (Singapore) Lin Ye
14. (India) Manika Batra
15. (Iran) Mahshid Ashtari
16. (Qatar) Maha Faramarzi

=== Group stage ===
The group stage took place on 5 April.

Group A

Pos.	Player	(China); Zhu	(Hong Kong); Doo	(Japan); Hirano	(Thailand); Sawettabut	Points	Qualification
1	(China) Zhu Yuling	—	3–0	3–1	3–0	6	Advance to second stage
2	(Hong Kong) Doo Hoi Kem	0–3	—	3–2	3–0	5	Advance to second stage
3	(Japan) Miu Hirano	1–3	2–3	—	3–0	4	Advance to play-off
4	(Thailand) Suthasini Sawettabut	0–3	0–3	0–3	—	3	

Group B

Pos.	Player	(China); Chen	(South Korea); Jeon	(Chinese Taipei); Cheng	(Hong Kong); Lee	Points	Qualification
1	(China) Chen Meng	—	3–0	3–1	3–1	6	Advance to second stage
2	(South Korea) Jeon Ji-hee	0–3	—	3–1	3–1	5	Advance to second stage
3	(Chinese Taipei) Cheng I-ching	1–3	1–3	—	3–1	4	Advance to play-off
4	(Hong Kong) Lee Ho Ching	1–3	1–3	1–3	—	3	

Group C

Pos.	Player	(Singapore); Feng	(Japan); Ishikawa	(Chinese Taipei); Chen	(South Korea); Suh	Points	Qualification
1	(Singapore) Feng Tianwei	—	3–0	3–1	3–2	6	Advance to second stage
2	(Japan) Kasumi Ishikawa	0–3	—	3–0	3–0	5	Advance to second stage
3	(Chinese Taipei) Chen Szu-yu	1–3	0–3	—	3–2	4	Advance to play-off
4	(South Korea) Suh Hyowon	2–3	0–3	2–3	—	3	

Group D

Pos.	Player	(Singapore); Lin	(Iran); Ashtari	(India); Batra	(Qatar); Faramarzi	Points	Qualification
1	(Singapore) Lin Ye	—	3–0	3–0	3–0	6	Advance to play-off
2	(Iran) Mahshid Ashtari	0–3	—	3–2	3–0	5	
3	(India) Manika Batra	0–3	2–3	—	3–0	4	
4	(Qatar) Maha Faramarzi	0–3	0–3	0–3	—	3	

Play-offs

Play-offs
(Chinese Taipei) Chen Szu-yu	0
(Japan) Miu Hirano	3
(Singapore) Lin Ye	0
(Chinese Taipei) Cheng I-ching	3

=== Main draw ===
The main draw took place on 6 and 7 April.

Quarterfinals
(China) Zhu Yuling	9	11	11	10	11	11
(Japan) Miu Hirano	11	7	2	12	7	8
(South Korea) Jeon Ji-hee	2	7	9	7
(Singapore) Feng Tianwei	11	11	11	11
(Japan) Kasumi Ishikawa	11	9	15	9	12	11
(Hong Kong) Doo Hoi Kem	9	11	13	11	10	7
(Chinese Taipei) Cheng I-ching
(China) Chen Meng	w/o

Semifinals
(China) Zhu Yuling	9	11	11	11	14
(Singapore) Feng Tianwei	11	9	5	5	12
(Japan) Kasumi Ishikawa	1	9	4	11	8
(China) Chen Meng	11	11	11	7	11

Final
(China) Zhu Yuling	15	4	11	11	7	11
(China) Chen Meng	13	11	5	8	11	6
Third place
(Singapore) Feng Tianwei	10	12	17	15	8
(Japan) Kasumi Ishikawa	12	14	15	17	11

5th-8th place play-off

Play-off
(Japan) Miu Hirano	6	11	11	11	11
(South Korea) Jeon Ji-hee	11	7	6	8	5
(Hong Kong) Doo Hoi Kem	w/o
(Chinese Taipei) Cheng I-ching

Fifth place
(Japan) Miu Hirano	11	12	8	7	11	3	7
(Hong Kong) Doo Hoi Kem	7	10	11	11	8	11	11
Seventh place
(South Korea) Jeon Ji-hee	w/o
(Chinese Taipei) Cheng I-ching

== See also ==
- 2019 Asian Table Tennis Championships
- 2019 Europe Top 16 Cup
- 2019 ITTF Pan-America Cup
- 2019 ITTF-Oceania Cup
