= 2019 World Table Tennis Championships =

- Date: 21 April – 28 April
- Edition: 55th
- Location: Budapest, Hungary
- Venue: Hungexpo

Champions

Men's singles
- (China) Ma Long

Women's singles
- (China) Liu Shiwen

Men's doubles
- (China) Ma Long / (China) Wang Chuqin

Women's doubles
- (China) Sun Yingsha / (China) Wang Manyu

Mixed doubles
- (China) Xu Xin / (China) Liu Shiwen
- World Table Tennis Championships

The 2019 World Table Tennis Championships were held in Budapest, Hungary from 21 to 28 April 2019. It was the 55th edition of the championships, and the fourth time that they were held in Budapest.

== Schedule ==
Five events were contested, with qualification rounds taking place on 21 and 22 April.

Rounds in main draw
Finals

Date	22 April	23 April	24 April	25 April	26 April	27 April	28 April
Men's singles		R1, R2	R3	R4	QF	SF	F
Women's singles		R1, R2	R3, R4	QF	SF	F	
Men's doubles	R1	R2	R3	QF	SF	F	
Women's doubles	R1	R2	R3	QF		SF	F
Mixed doubles	R1, R2		R3, QF	SF	F		

== Medal summary ==
=== Medal table ===
Rank	Nation	Gold	Silver	Bronze	Total
1	China (CHN)	5	1	6	12
2	Japan (JPN)	0	2	1	3
3	Sweden (SWE)	0	1	0	1
4	Romania (ROU)	0	0.5	0	0.5
4	Spain (ESP)	0	0.5	0	0.5
6	Germany (GER)	0	0	1	1
6	Portugal (POR)	0	0	1	1
6	South Korea (KOR)	0	0	1	1
Totals (8 entries)		5	5	10	20

=== Medalists ===
Event	Gold	Silver	Bronze
Men's singles	(China) Ma Long	(Sweden) Mattias Falck	(China) Liang Jingkun
Men's singles	(China) Ma Long	(Sweden) Mattias Falck	(South Korea) An Jae-hyun
Women's singles	(China) Liu Shiwen	(China) Chen Meng	(China) Ding Ning
Women's singles	(China) Liu Shiwen	(China) Chen Meng	(China) Wang Manyu
Men's doubles	(China) Ma Long (China) Wang Chuqin	(Romania) Ovidiu Ionescu (Spain) Álvaro Robles	(Portugal) Tiago Apolónia (Portugal) João Monteiro
Men's doubles	(China) Ma Long (China) Wang Chuqin	(Romania) Ovidiu Ionescu (Spain) Álvaro Robles	(China) Liang Jingkun (China) Lin Gaoyuan
Women's doubles	(China) Sun Yingsha (China) Wang Manyu	(Japan) Hina Hayata (Japan) Mima Ito	(Japan) Honoka Hashimoto (Japan) Hitomi Sato
Women's doubles	(China) Sun Yingsha (China) Wang Manyu	(Japan) Hina Hayata (Japan) Mima Ito	(China) Chen Meng (China) Zhu Yuling
Mixed doubles	(China) Xu Xin (China) Liu Shiwen	(Japan) Maharu Yoshimura (Japan) Kasumi Ishikawa	(China) Fan Zhendong (China) Ding Ning
Mixed doubles	(China) Xu Xin (China) Liu Shiwen	(Japan) Maharu Yoshimura (Japan) Kasumi Ishikawa	(Germany) Patrick Franziska (Germany) Petrissa Solja

== See also ==
- 2019 ITTF World Tour
- 2019 ITTF World Tour Grand Finals
- 2019 ITTF Men's World Cup
- 2019 ITTF Women's World Cup
- 2019 ITTF Team World Cup
- 2019 World Junior Table Tennis Championships
