= 2019 Europe Top 16 Cup =

Tournament details
- Dates: 2–3 February 2019
- Edition: 48th
- Venue: Salle Omnisport du Pierrier
- Location: Montreux, Switzerland

Champions
- Men's singles: (Germany) Dimitrij Ovtcharov
- Women's singles: (Germany) Petrissa Solja

The 2019 Europe Top 16 Cup (also referred to as the 2019 CCB Europe Top 16 Cup for sponsorship reasons) was a table tennis competition held from 2–3 February in Montreux, Switzerland, organised under the authority of the European Table Tennis Union (ETTU). It was the 48th edition of the event, and the fourth time that it had been held in Switzerland.

Events were held in men's singles and women's singles, and the three medallists in each event qualified for the 2019 Men's and Women's World Cups.

== Medallists ==
Event	Gold	Silver	Bronze
Men's Singles	(Germany) Dimitrij Ovtcharov	(Belarus) Vladimir Samsonov	(Germany) Timo Boll
Women's Singles	(Germany) Petrissa Solja	(Romania) Bernadette Szőcs	(Austria) Sofia Polcanova

== Qualification ==
In total, 16 players qualified for both the men's and women's singles:

- The current European Champion
- The 14 highest-ranked players in December 2018, excluding the European Champion
- A host association representative

A maximum of two players from each association could qualify.

Means of qualification	Men's singles	Women's singles
2018 European Championships	(Germany) Timo Boll	(Poland) Li Qian
European ranking (December 2018)	(Germany) Dimitrij Ovtcharov (Sweden) Mattias Falck (England) Liam Pitchford (Belarus) Vladimir Samsonov (Denmark) Jonathan Groth (France) Simon Gauzy (Sweden) Kristian Karlsson (Portugal) Marcos Freitas (France) Emmanuel Lebesson (Austria) Daniel Habesohn (Portugal) Tiago Apolónia (Ukraine) Kou Lei (Romania) Ovidiu Ionescu (Greece) Panagiotis Gionis	(Austria) Sofia Polcanova (Romania) Bernadette Szőcs (Romania) Elizabeta Samara (Netherlands) Li Jie (Germany) Petrissa Solja (Sweden) Matilda Ekholm (Hungary) Georgina Póta (Netherlands) Britt Eerland (Russia) Polina Mikhaylova (Luxembourg) Ni Xialian (Germany) Nina Mittelham (Poland) Natalia Partyka (Czech Republic) Hana Matelová (Slovakia) Barbora Balážová
Host association representative	(Switzerland) Lionel Weber	(Switzerland) Rachel Moret
Total	16	16

== Men's singles ==
=== Seeding ===
Players were seeded according to the European ranking for February 2019.

1. (Germany) Timo Boll (bronze medalist)
2. (Sweden) Mattias Falck (first round)
3. (Germany) Dimitrij Ovtcharov (champion)
4. (England) Liam Pitchford (first round)
5. (Belarus) Vladimir Samsonov (final)
6. (Denmark) Jonathan Groth (quarterfinals)
7. (Portugal) Marcos Freitas (first round)
8. (Sweden) Kristian Karlsson (quarterfinals)
9. (France) Simon Gauzy (quarterfinals)
10. (France) Emmanuel Lebesson (first round)
11. (Austria) Daniel Habesohn (semifinals)
12. (Romania) Ovidiu Ionescu (first round)
13. (Portugal) Tiago Apolónia (first round)
14. (Greece) Panagiotis Gionis (quarterfinals)
15. (Ukraine) Kou Lei (first round)
16. (Switzerland) Lionel Weber (first round)

=== Draw ===
First round
1	(Germany) Timo Boll	11	11	11	11
13	(Portugal) Tiago Apolónia	3	4	5	5
10	(France) Emmanuel Lebesson	11	10	9	10	7
8	(Sweden) Kristian Karlsson	5	12	11	12	11
6	(Denmark) Jonathan Groth	11	11	11	11
16	(Switzerland) Lionel Weber	6	5	8	7
15	(Ukraine) Kou Lei	2	9	6	6
3	(Germany) Dimitrij Ovtcharov	11	11	11	11
4	(England) Liam Pitchford	9	8	9	7
9	(France) Simon Gauzy	11	11	11	11
11	(Austria) Daniel Habesohn	14	11	9	4	9	11	11
7	(Portugal) Marcos Freitas	12	6	11	11	11	8	7
5	(Belarus) Vladimir Samsonov	11	11	9	11	11
12	(Romania) Ovidiu Ionescu	3	10	11	8	5
14	(Greece) Panagiotis Gionis	11	12	10	11	11	11
2	(Sweden) Mattias Falck	8	14	12	4	7	8

Quarterfinals
1	(Germany) Timo Boll	11	12	11	6	11
8	(Sweden) Kristian Karlsson	3	10	6	11	1
6	(Denmark) Jonathan Groth	9	11	9	8	3
3	(Germany) Dimitrij Ovtcharov	11	4	11	11	11
9	(France) Simon Gauzy	7	11	9	11	5	7
11	(Austria) Daniel Habesohn	11	5	11	5	11	11
5	(Belarus) Vladimir Samsonov	11	10	11	11	11
14	(Greece) Panagiotis Gionis	7	12	4	2	7

Semifinals
1	(Germany) Timo Boll	9	3	3	11	11	11	7
3	(Germany) Dimitrij Ovtcharov	11	11	11	5	4	9	11
11	(Austria) Daniel Habesohn	9	4	11	9	11	9
5	(Belarus) Vladimir Samsonov	11	11	9	11	6	11

Final
3	(Germany) Dimitrij Ovtcharov	6	11	11	14	6	11	12
5	(Belarus) Vladimir Samsonov	11	8	3	16	11	7	10
Third place
1	(Germany) Timo Boll	11	11	7	9	3	12	11
11	(Austria) Daniel Habesohn	7	4	11	11	11	10	5

== Women's singles ==
=== Seeding ===
Players were seeded according to the European ranking for February 2019.

1. (Austria) Sofia Polcanova (bronze medalist)
2. (Romania) Bernadette Szőcs (final)
3. (Romania) Elizabeta Samara (quarterfinals)
4. (Netherlands) Li Jie (first round)
5. (Germany) Petrissa Solja (champion)
6. (Sweden) Matilda Ekholm (first round)
7. (Hungary) Georgina Póta (quarterfinals)
8. (Netherlands) Britt Eerland (first round)
9. (Poland) Li Qian (first round)
10. (Luxembourg) Ni Xialian (first round)
11. (Russia) Polina Mikhailova (first round)
12. (Czech Republic) Hana Matelová (first round)
13. (Germany) Nina Mittelham (quarterfinals)
14. (Slovakia) Barbora Balážová (quarterfinals)
15. (Poland) Natalia Partyka (semifinals)
16. (Switzerland) Rachel Moret (first round)

=== Draw ===
First round
1	(Austria) Sofia Polcanova	7	4	11	15	11	11	12
16	(Switzerland) Rachel Moret	11	11	6	13	6	13	10
13	(Germany) Nina Mittelham	11	8	14	11	13
6	(Sweden) Matilda Ekholm	9	11	12	6	11
5	(Germany) Petrissa Solja	9	11	12	5	5	11	11
9	(Poland) Li Qian	11	8	10	11	11	8	8
11	(Russia) Polina Mikhailova	9	10	10	7
3	(Romania) Elizabeta Samara	11	12	12	11
4	(Netherlands) Li Jie	11	10	8	11	5	11	7
15	(Poland) Natalia Partyka	7	12	11	8	11	7	11
10	(Luxembourg) Ni Xialian	2	9	6	7
7	(Hungary) Georgina Póta	11	11	11	11
8	(Netherlands) Britt Eerland	9	8	14	8
14	(Slovakia) Barbora Balážová	11	11	16	11
12	(Czech Republic) Hana Matelová	5	9	13	7	13	8
2	(Romania) Bernadette Szőcs	11	11	11	11	11	11

Quarterfinals
1	(Austria) Sofia Polcanova	11	11	11	8	10	15
13	(Germany) Nina Mittelham	6	8	6	11	12	13
5	(Germany) Petrissa Solja	11	11	9	11	11
3	(Romania) Elizabeta Samara	7	9	11	8	6
15	(Poland) Natalia Partyka	11	11	11	6	13
7	(Hungary) Georgina Póta	7	9	6	11	11
14	(Slovakia) Barbora Balážová	7	8	5	9
2	(Romania) Bernadette Szőcs	11	11	11	11

Semifinals
1	(Austria) Sofia Polcanova	13	11	7	11	10	9
5	(Germany) Petrissa Solja	15	4	11	3	12	11
15	(Poland) Natalia Partyka	8	11	8	12	12	11	2
2	(Romania) Bernadette Szőcs	11	9	11	10	14	9	11

Final
5	(Germany) Petrissa Solja	9	9	6	12	11	11	11
2	(Romania) Bernadette Szőcs	11	11	11	10	8	8	4
Third place
1	(Austria) Sofia Polcanova	7	11	7	12	11	11
15	(Poland) Natalia Partyka	11	4	11	10	7	6

== See also ==
- 2019 ITTF-ATTU Asian Cup
- 2019 ITTF Pan-America Cup
- 2019 ITTF-Oceania Cup
