= Oceania Table Tennis Federation =

International sports governing body

- Sport: Table tennis
- Abbreviation: OTTF
- Founded: 1 June 1977
- Affiliation: ITTF
- President: Patrick Gillmann (New Caledonia)

Official website
- oceania.ittf.com

The Oceania Table Tennis Federation (OTTF) is a table tennis organization founded on 1 June 1977, recognized by International Table Tennis Federation (ITTF) as its continental federation in Oceania. Discussions began at the Commonwealth Table Tennis Championships held in Melbourne, 1975. Seven foundation members were New Zealand, Australia, Guam, Papua New Guinea, Fiji, New Caledonia and Tahiti.

== Members ==
There are 24 affiliated member associations.

- American Samoa - American Samoa Table Tennis Association
- Australia - Table Tennis Australia
- Cook Islands - Cook Islands Table Tennis Association
- Federated States of Micronesia - Federated States of Micronesia Table Tennis Association
- Fiji - Fiji Table Tennis Association
- Guam - Guam Table Tennis Association
- Kiribati - Kiribati Table Tennis Association
- Marshall Islands - Marshall Islands Table Tennis Association
- Nauru - Nauru Table Tennis Association
- New Caledonia - Ligue Caledonienne de Tennis de Table
- New Zealand - Table Tennis New Zealand
- Niue - Niue Table Tennis Association
- Norfolk Island - Norfolk Island Table Tennis Association
- Northern Mariana Islands - Marianas Table Tennis Association
- Palau - Palau Table Tennis Association
- Papua New Guinea - Papua & New Guinea Table Tennis Association
- Samoa - Samoa Table Tennis Association
- Solomon Islands - Solomon Islands Table Tennis Association
- Tahiti - Federation Tahitienne de Tennis de Table
- Tokelau - Tokelau Table Tennis Association
- Tonga - Tonga Amateur Table Tennis Association
- Tuvalu - Tuvalu Table Tennis Association
- Vanuatu - Vanuatu Table Tennis Federation
- Wallis and Futuna - Wallis & Futuna Table Tennis Association

== Competitions ==
Competitions held by OTTF:

- Oceania Championships
- Oceania Cup
- Pacific Cup
- Oceania Cadet Challenge

Competitions held by other organizations:

- Pacific Games
