= 2019 ITTF Women's World Cup =

- Location: Chengdu, China
- Date: 18-20 October 2019
- Competitors: 20

Medalists
gold medal	(China) Liu Shiwen
silver medal	(China) Zhu Yuling
bronze medal	(Singapore) Feng Tianwei

The 2019 ITTF Women's World Cup was a table tennis competition held in Chengdu, China, from 18 to 20 October 2019. It was the 23rd edition of the ITTF-sanctioned event.

== Qualification ==
In total, 20 players qualified for the World Cup:

- The current World Champion
- 18 players from the five Continental Cups held during 2019
- A wild card, selected by the ITTF

A maximum of two players from each association could qualify.

Means of qualification	Date	Venue	Places	Qualified players
2019 World Championships	23–27 April 2019	(Hungary) Budapest	1	(China) Liu Shiwen
2019 ITTF Pan-America Cup	1–3 February 2019	(Puerto Rico) Guaynabo	2	(Puerto Rico) Adriana Díaz (Canada) Zhang Mo
2019 Europe Top 16 Cup	2–3 February 2019	(Switzerland) Montreux	3	(Germany) Petrissa Solja (Romania) Bernadette Szőcs (Austria) Sofia Polcanova
2019 ITTF-ATTU Asian Cup	5–7 April 2019	(Japan) Yokohama	3	(China) Zhu Yuling (Japan) Kasumi Ishikawa (Singapore) Feng Tianwei
2019 ITTF-Oceania Cup	25–26 May 2019	(French Polynesia) Bora Bora	1	(Australia) Jian Fang Lay
2019 ITTF Africa Cup	3–5 August 2019	(Nigeria) Lagos	1	(Egypt) Dina Meshref
Additional qualifiers (Note: Based on Continental Cup finishing position and ITTF World Ranking.)	n/a	n/a	8	(Hong Kong) Doo Hoi Kem (Japan) Miu Hirano (South Korea) Jeon Ji-hee (Chinese Taipei) Cheng I-ching (Chinese Taipei) Chen Szu-yu (United States) Jennifer Wu (Poland) Natalia Partyka (Romania) Elizabeta Samara
ITTF wild card	n/a	n/a	1	(United States) Lily Zhang
Total			20	

== Competition format ==
The tournament consisted of two stages: a preliminary group stage and a knockout stage. The players seeded 9 to 20 were drawn into four groups, with three players in each group. The top two players from each group then joined the top eight seeded players in the second stage of the competition, which consisted of a knockout draw.

== Seeding ==
The seeding list was based on the official ITTF world ranking for October 2019.

1. (China) Zhu Yuling (final)
2. (China) Liu Shiwen (champion)
3. (Japan) Kasumi Ishikawa (quarterfinals)
4. (Japan) Miu Hirano (first round)
5. (Chinese Taipei) Cheng I-ching (quarterfinals)
6. (Hong Kong) Doo Hoi Kem (first round)
7. (Singapore) Feng Tianwei (semifinals)
8. (Austria) Sofia Polcanova (quarterfinals)
9. (Romania) Bernadette Szőcs (first round)
10. (South Korea) Jeon Ji-hee (first round)
11. (Germany) Petrissa Solja (quarterfinals)
12. (Romania) Elizabeta Samara (preliminary round)
13. (Chinese Taipei) Chen Szu-yu (first round)
14. (Canada) Zhang Mo (first round)
15. (Puerto Rico) Adriana Diaz (preliminary round)
16. (Egypt) Dina Meshref (first round)
17. (United States) Yue Wu (first round)
18. (United States) Lily Zhang (semifinals)
19. (Poland) Natalia Partyka (preliminary round)
20. (Australia) Jian Fang Lay (preliminary round)

== Preliminary stage ==
The preliminary group stage took place on 18 October, with the top two players in each group progressing to the main draw.

	Group A	(Romania) Szőcs	(United States) Zhang	(Puerto Rico) Diaz	Points
9	(Romania) Bernadette Szőcs		4–1	4–2	4
18	(United States) Lily Zhang	1–4		4–1	3
15	(Puerto Rico) Adriana Diaz	2–4	1–4		2

	Group B	(South Korea) Jeon	(Egypt) Meshref	(Poland) Partyka	Points
10	(South Korea) Jeon Ji-hee		4–1	4–0	4
16	(Egypt) Dina Meshref	1–4		4–2	3
19	(Poland) Natalia Partyka	0–4	2–4		2

	Group C	(Germany) Solja	(Chinese Taipei) Chen	(Australia) Lay	Points
11	(Germany) Petrissa Solja		4–1	4–3	4
13	(Chinese Taipei) Chen Szu-yu	1–4		4–1	3
20	(Australia) Jian Fang Lay	3–4	1–4		2

	Group D	(United States) Wu	(Canada) Zhang	(Romania) Samara	Points
17	(United States) Yue Wu		4–1	4–0	4
14	(Canada) Zhang Mo	1–4		4–3	3
12	(Romania) Elizabeta Samara	0–4	3–4		2

== Main draw ==
The knockout stage took place from 19-20 October.

First round
1	(China) Zhu Yuling	11	11	11	11
14	(Canada) Zhang Mo	2	3	3	4
11	(Germany) Petrissa Solja	6	11	11	11	11	11
6	(Hong Kong) Doo Hoi Kem	11	13	8	9	5	7
7	(Singapore) Feng Tianwei	11	12	11	11
9	(Romania) Bernadette Szőcs	8	10	8	8
16	(Egypt) Dina Meshref	4	10	7	6
3	(Japan) Kasumi Ishikawa	11	12	11	11
4	(Japan) Miu Hirano	10	8	11	11	11	5	5
18	(United States) Lily Zhang	12	11	8	8	8	11	11
17	(United States) Yue Wu	11	4	12	11	9
8	(Austria) Sofia Polcanova	13	11	14	6	11
5	(Chinese Taipei) Cheng I-ching	14	11	11	7	11
10	(South Korea) Jeon Ji-hee	12	5	9	11	8
13	(Chinese Taipei) Chen Szu-yu	9	4	11	9	6
2	(China) Liu Shiwen	11	11	7	11	11

Quarterfinals
1	(China) Zhu Yuling	11	11	11	11
11	(Germany) Petrissa Solja	4	1	6	7
7	(Singapore) Feng Tianwei	12	7	11	8	8	12	11
3	(Japan) Kasumi Ishikawa	10	11	8	11	11	10	7
18	(United States) Lily Zhang	11	8	11	4	8	11	11
8	(Austria) Sofia Polcanova	9	11	8	11	11	8	8
5	(Chinese Taipei) Cheng I-ching	4	8	5	10
2	(China) Liu Shiwen	11	11	11	12

Semifinals
1	(China) Zhu Yuling	11	11	9	11	11	11
7	(Singapore) Feng Tianwei	1	13	11	5	5	5
18	(United States) Lily Zhang	6	1	5	5
2	(China) Liu Shiwen	11	11	11	11

Final
1	(China) Zhu Yuling	11	8	8	6	11	9
2	(China) Liu Shiwen	4	11	11	11	3	11
Third place
7	(Singapore) Feng Tianwei	11	11	11	5	15
18	(United States) Lily Zhang	6	8	8	11	13

== See also ==
- 2019 World Table Tennis Championships
- 2019 ITTF World Tour
- 2019 ITTF Men's World Cup
- 2019 ITTF Team World Cup
