= 2019 ITTF Men's World Cup =

Table tennis tournament in Chengdu, China

- Location: Chengdu, China
- Date: 29 November – 1 December 2019
- Competitors: 20

Medalists
gold medal	(China) Fan Zhendong
silver medal	(Japan) Tomokazu Harimoto
bronze medal	(Chinese Taipei) Lin Yun-ju

The 2019 ITTF Men's World Cup was a table tennis competition held in Chengdu, China, from 29 November to 1 December 2019. It was the 40th edition of the ITTF-sanctioned event.

== Qualification ==
In total, 20 players qualified for the World Cup:

- The reigning World Champion
- 18 players from the five Continental Cups held during 2019
- A wild card, selected by the ITTF

A maximum of two players from each association could qualify.

Means of qualification	Date	Venue	Places	Qualified players
2019 World Championships	23–28 April 2019	(Hungary) Budapest	1	(China) Ma Long
2019 ITTF Pan-America Cup	1–3 February 2019	(Puerto Rico) Guaynabo	2	(Brazil) Hugo Calderano (United States) Kanak Jha
2019 Europe Top 16 Cup	2–3 February 2019	(Switzerland) Montreux	3	(Germany) Dimitrij Ovtcharov (Belarus) Vladimir Samsonov (Germany) Timo Boll
2019 ITTF-ATTU Asian Cup	5–7 April 2019	(Japan) Yokohama	3	(China) Fan Zhendong (Japan) Koki Niwa (Japan) Tomokazu Harimoto
2019 ITTF-Oceania Cup	25–26 May 2019	(French Polynesia) Bora Bora	1	(Australia) Hu Heming
2019 ITTF Africa Cup	3–5 August 2019	(Nigeria) Lagos	1	(Egypt) Omar Assar
Additional qualifiers (Note: Based on Continental Cup finishing position and ITTF World Ranking.)	n/a	n/a	8	(Chinese Taipei) Lin Yun-ju (Austria) Daniel Habesohn (France) Simon Gauzy (Denmark) Jonathan Groth (Sweden) Kristian Karlsson (India) Sathiyan Gnanasekaran (South Korea) Lee Sang-su; ~~(Hong Kong) Wong Chun Ting~~ (Note: Wong Chun Ting withdrew due to injury and was replaced by Quadri Aruna.) (Nigeria) Quadri Aruna
ITTF wild card	n/a	n/a	1	(Sweden) Mattias Falck
Total			20	

== Competition format ==
The tournament consisted of two stages: a preliminary group stage and a knockout stage. The players seeded 9 to 20 were drawn into four groups, with three players in each group. The top two players from each group joined the top eight seeded players in the second stage of the competition, which consisted of a knockout draw.

== Seeding ==
The seeding list was based on the official ITTF world ranking for October 2019.

1. (China) Fan Zhendong (champion)
2. (China) Ma Long (semifinals)
3. (Japan) Tomokazu Harimoto (final)
4. (Brazil) Hugo Calderano (quarterfinals)
5. (Germany) Timo Boll (quarterfinals)
6. (Sweden) Mattias Falck (first round)
7. (Chinese Taipei) Lin Yun-ju (semifinals)
8. (Japan) Koki Niwa (quarterfinals)
9. (Germany) Dimitrij Ovtcharov (quarterfinals)
10. (South Korea) Lee Sang-su (first round)
11. (Nigeria) Quadri Aruna (first round)
12. (France) Simon Gauzy (first round)
13. (Belarus) Vladimir Samsonov (preliminary round)
14. (Denmark) Jonathan Groth (preliminary round)
15. (Sweden) Kristian Karlsson (first round)
16. (United States) Kanak Jha (first round)
17. (India) Sathiyan Gnanasekaran (first round)
18. (Egypt) Omar Assar (preliminary round)
19. (Austria) Daniel Habesohn (first round)
20. (Australia) Hu Heming (preliminary round)

== Preliminary stage ==
The preliminary group stage took place on 29 November, with the top two players in each group progressing to the main draw.

	Group A	(Germany) Ovtcharov	(Austria) Habesohn	(Belarus) Samsonov	Points
9	(Germany) Dimitrij Ovtcharov		4–3	4–2	4
19	(Austria) Daniel Habesohn	3–4		4–3	3
13	(Belarus) Vladimir Samsonov	2–4	3–4		2

	Group B	(South Korea) Lee	(United States) Jha	(Egypt) Assar	Points
10	(South Korea) Lee Sang-su		4–2	4–1	4
16	(United States) Kanak Jha	2–4		4–2	3
18	(Egypt) Omar Assar	1–4	2–4		2

	Group C	(Sweden) Karlsson	(Nigeria) Aruna	(Australia) Heming	Points
15	(Sweden) Kristian Karlsson		4–0	4–1	4
11	(Nigeria) Quadri Aruna	0–4		4–0	3
20	(Australia) Hu Heming	1–4	0–4		2

	Group D	(India) Gnanasekaran	(France) Gauzy	(Denmark) Groth	Points
17	(India) Sathiyan Gnanasekaran		4–3	4–2	4
12	(France) Simon Gauzy	3–4		4–1	3
14	(Denmark) Jonathan Groth	2–4	1–4		2

== Main draw ==
The knockout stage took place from 29 November to 1 December.

First round
1	(China) Fan Zhendong	11	13	11	11
19	(Austria) Daniel Habesohn	8	11	7	2
17	(India) Sathiyan Gnanasekaran	11	8	5	9	8
5	(Germany) Timo Boll	7	11	11	11	11
7	(Chinese Taipei) Lin Yun-ju	11	11	11	4	11
15	(Sweden) Kristian Karlsson	8	4	7	11	9
16	(United States) Kanak Jha	11	11	6	11	7	5	8
4	(Brazil) Hugo Calderano	9	9	11	9	11	11	11
3	(Japan) Tomokazu Harimoto	11	13	12	6	11
11	(Nigeria) Quadri Aruna	7	11	10	11	6
10	(South Korea) Lee Sang-su	6	8	16	7	11	11
8	(Japan) Koki Niwa	11	11	14	11	8	13
6	(Sweden) Mattias Falck	8	11	11	8	12	7	11
9	(Germany) Dimitrij Ovtcharov	11	3	8	11	10	11	13
12	(France) Simon Gauzy	7	8	11	5	11	13
2	(China) Ma Long	11	11	9	11	8	15

Quarterfinals
1	(China) Fan Zhendong	11	11	11	7	12
5	(Germany) Timo Boll	6	9	5	11	10
7	(Chinese Taipei) Lin Yun-ju	5	11	11	11	11
4	(Brazil) Hugo Calderano	11	4	6	6	3
3	(Japan) Tomokazu Harimoto	11	11	10	10	12	11	11
8	(Japan) Koki Niwa	6	7	12	12	14	3	8
9	(Germany) Dimitrij Ovtcharov	11	9	4	11	3
2	(China) Ma Long	6	11	11	13	11

Semifinals
1	(China) Fan Zhendong	11	11	11	11
7	(Chinese Taipei) Lin Yun-ju	8	6	8	5
3	(Japan) Tomokazu Harimoto	11	11	11	8	4	11
2	(China) Ma Long	6	9	8	11	11	5

Final
1	(China) Fan Zhendong	9	11	6	11	11	11
3	(Japan) Tomokazu Harimoto	11	4	11	8	2	7
Third place
7	(Chinese Taipei) Lin Yun-ju	11	13	8	9	11	5	11
2	(China) Ma Long	4	11	11	11	8	11	4

== See also ==
- 2019 World Table Tennis Championships
- 2019 ITTF World Tour
- 2019 ITTF Women's World Cup
- 2019 ITTF Team World Cup
