= 2019 ITTF Team World Cup =

Table tennis competition held in Japan

- Venue: Tokyo Metropolitan Gymnasium
- Location: Tokyo, Japan
- Date: 6–10 November 2019
- Competitors: 97 from 17 nations
- Total prize money: $270,000

Champions
- Men: China
- Women: China

The 2019 ITTF Team World Cup (also known as the ZEN-NOH 2019 ITTF Team World Cup for sponsorship reasons) was a table tennis competition that took place in Tokyo, Japan, from 6 to 10 November 2019. It was the 12th edition of the ITTF-sanctioned event, and also served as one of the test events for the 2020 Summer Olympics.

China won both events, defeating South Korea in the men's team final and Japan in the women's team final.

== Medallists ==
Event	Gold	Silver	Bronze
Men's team	China; Fan Zhendong; Xu Xin; Lin Gaoyuan; Ma Long; Liang Jingkun	South Korea; Jang Woo-jin; Lee Sang-su; Jung Young-sik; Lim Jong-hoon; Cho Dae-seong	Chinese Taipei; Lin Yun-ju; Chen Chien-an; Liao Cheng-ting; Peng Wang-wei; Wang Tai-wei
Men's team	China; Fan Zhendong; Xu Xin; Lin Gaoyuan; Ma Long; Liang Jingkun	South Korea; Jang Woo-jin; Lee Sang-su; Jung Young-sik; Lim Jong-hoon; Cho Dae-seong	Japan; Tomokazu Harimoto; Koki Niwa; Jun Mizutani; Maharu Yoshimura; Takuya Jin
Women's team	China; Chen Meng; Liu Shiwen; Sun Yingsha; Wang Manyu; Ding Ning	Japan; Mima Ito; Kasumi Ishikawa; Miu Hirano; Hitomi Sato	Chinese Taipei; Cheng I-ching; Chen Szu-yu; Cheng Hsien-tzu; Liu Hsing-yin; Su Pei-ling
Women's team	China; Chen Meng; Liu Shiwen; Sun Yingsha; Wang Manyu; Ding Ning	Japan; Mima Ito; Kasumi Ishikawa; Miu Hirano; Hitomi Sato	South Korea; Suh Hyo-won; Jeon Ji-hee; Choi Hyo-joo; Yang Ha-eun; Shin Yu-bin

== Qualification ==
The host nation Japan, and each of the current continental team champions qualified for both the men's and women's events, with additional places awarded to the highest-placed teams at the 2018 World Team Championships that had not already qualified through continental events.

Men

Event	Berths	Qualified
Host	1	Japan
2018 African Championships	1	Nigeria
2018 Oceania Championships	1	Australia
2018 Pan American Championships	2	Brazil; United States
2019 European Championships	1	Germany
2019 Asian Championships	1	China
2018 World Team Championships	5	Austria; Chinese Taipei; England; South Korea; Sweden
TOTAL	12	

Women

Event	Berths	Qualified
Host	1	Japan
2018 African Championships	1	Egypt
2018 Oceania Championships	1	Vanuatu
2018 Pan American Championships	2	Brazil; United States
2019 European Championships	1	Romania
2019 Asian Championships	1	China
2018 World Team Championships	5	Austria; Chinese Taipei; Hong Kong; South Korea; Ukraine
TOTAL	12	

Notes

1. ^{a} Two qualifying places awarded, to ensure that both North and South America were represented.
2. ^{b} Five qualifying places awarded to the highest-placed teams that did not already qualify through continental events.
3. ^{c} Australia initially qualified, but later withdrew from the World Cup. Their place was taken by Vanuatu.

== Men's team ==
=== Seeding ===
Teams were seeded based on the latest ITTF World Team Ranking.

1. China
2. Japan
3. Germany
4. South Korea
5. Sweden
6. Brazil
7. Chinese Taipei
8. Austria
9. England
10. Nigeria
11. United States
12. Australia

=== Group stage ===
The group stage took place on 6 and 7 November.

==== Group A ====
Pos	Team	Pld	W	L	MW	ML	Pts	Qualification
1	China	2	2	0	6	0	4	Advance to knockout stage
2	Chinese Taipei	2	1	1	3	4	3	Advance to knockout stage
3	Nigeria	2	0	2	1	6	2	

==== Group B ====
Pos	Team	Pld	W	L	MW	ML	Pts	Qualification
1	England	2	2	0	6	1	4	Advance to knockout stage
2	Japan	2	1	1	4	4	3	Advance to knockout stage
3	Austria	2	0	2	1	6	2	

==== Group C ====
Pos	Team	Pld	W	L	MW	ML	Pts	Qualification
1	Germany	2	2	0	6	0	4	Advance to knockout stage
2	Brazil	2	1	1	3	3	3	Advance to knockout stage
3	Australia	2	0	2	0	6	2	

==== Group D ====
Pos	Team	Pld	W	L	MW	ML	Pts	Qualification
1	South Korea	2	2	0	6	1	4	Advance to knockout stage
2	United States	2	1	1	4	5	3	Advance to knockout stage
3	Sweden	2	0	2	2	6	2	

=== Knockout stage ===
The knockout stage took place from 7 to 10 November.

Quarterfinals
China	3
United States	0
Japan	3
Germany	1
South Korea	3
Brazil	1
Chinese Taipei	3
England	0

Semifinals
China	3
Japan	0
South Korea	3
Chinese Taipei	0

Final
China	3
South Korea	1

== Women's team ==
=== Seeding ===
Teams were seeded based on the latest ITTF World Team Ranking.

1. China
2. Japan
3. Chinese Taipei
4. Hong Kong
5. South Korea
6. Romania
7. United States
8. Ukraine
9. Austria
10. Egypt
11. Brazil
12. Vanuatu

=== Group stage ===
The group stage took place on 6 and 7 November.

==== Group A ====
Pos	Team	Pld	W	L	MW	ML	Pts	Qualification
1	China	2	2	0	6	0	4	Advance to knockout stage
2	Ukraine	2	1	1	3	4	3	Advance to knockout stage
3	Egypt	2	0	2	1	6	2	

==== Group B ====
Pos	Team	Pld	W	L	MW	ML	Pts	Qualification
1	Japan	2	2	0	6	0	4	Advance to knockout stage
2	United States	2	1	1	3	1	3	Advance to knockout stage
3	Austria	2	0	2	1	6	2	

==== Group C ====
Pos	Team	Pld	W	L	MW	ML	Pts	Qualification
1	Chinese Taipei	2	2	0	6	1	4	Advance to knockout stage
2	Romania	2	1	1	4	3	3	Advance to knockout stage
3	Vanuatu	2	0	2	0	6	2	

==== Group D ====
Pos	Team	Pld	W	L	MW	ML	Pts	Qualification
1	South Korea	2	2	0	6	0	4	Advance to knockout stage
2	Hong Kong	2	1	1	3	3	3	Advance to knockout stage
3	Brazil	2	0	2	0	6	2	

=== Knockout stage ===
The knockout stage took place from 8 to 10 November.

Quarterfinals
China	3
United States	0
Hong Kong	2
Chinese Taipei	3
South Korea	3
Ukraine	1
Romania	0
Japan	3

Semifinals
China	3
Chinese Taipei	0
South Korea	1
Japan	3

Final
China	3
Japan	0

== See also ==
- 2019 World Table Tennis Championships
- 2019 ITTF World Tour
- 2019 ITTF Men's World Cup
- 2019 ITTF Women's World Cup
