= 2018 Qatar Open (table tennis) =

Tournament details
- Dates: 8–11 March 2018
- Edition: 22nd
- Competitors: 32S / 16D
- Total prize money: US$235,000
- Venue: Ali Bin Hamad al-Attiyah Arena
- Location: Doha, Qatar

Champions
- Men's singles: (China) Fan Zhendong
- Women's singles: (China) Liu Shiwen
- Men's doubles: (China) Fan Zhendong (China) Xu Xin
- Women's doubles: (China) Chen Ke (China) Wang Manyu

The 2018 Qatar Open was the second event of the 2018 ITTF World Tour. It was the first of six top-tier Platinum events on the tour, and took place from 8–11 March in Doha, Qatar.

== Men's singles ==
=== Seeds ===
1. (China) Fan Zhendong (champion)
2. (Germany) Timo Boll (second round)
3. (China) Lin Gaoyuan (semifinals)
4. (China) Xu Xin (semifinals)
5. (Japan) Koki Niwa (first round)
6. (Hong Kong) Wong Chun Ting (quarterfinals)
7. (France) Simon Gauzy (first round)
8. (Japan) Tomokazu Harimoto (quarterfinals)
9. (Portugal) Marcos Freitas (first round)
10. (Chinese Taipei) Chuang Chih-yuan (first round)
11. (Japan) Jun Mizutani (second round)
12. (South Korea) Lee Sang-su (second round)
13. (Brazil) Hugo Calderano (final)
14. (Egypt) Omar Assar (first round)
15. (Japan) Yuya Oshima (first round)
16. (Qatar) Li Ping (first round)

=== Draw ===
==== Top half ====
First round
1	(China) Fan Zhendong	11	5	11	11	13
(Japan) Maharu Yoshimura	9	11	3	1	11
(Germany) Patrick Franziska	11	7	7	11	11	5
11	(Japan) Jun Mizutani	5	11	11	7	13	11
16	(Qatar) Li Ping	8	6	9	11	5
(Denmark) Jonathan Groth	11	11	11	5	11
(India) Achanta Sharath Kamal	9	11	11	14	11
5	(Japan) Koki Niwa	11	9	8	12	9
7	(France) Simon Gauzy	3	8	4	11	9
(Sweden) Mattias Karlsson	11	11	11	8	11
(China) Zhou Yu	11	13	12	8	11
14	(Egypt) Omar Assar	5	11	10	11	6
12	(South Korea) Lee Sang-su	12	11	5	6	12	11
(Germany) Bastian Steger	10	9	11	11	10	9
(Portugal) Tiago Apolónia	15	2	5	8	4
4	(China) Xu Xin	13	11	11	11	11

Second round
1	(China) Fan Zhendong	8	11	11	11	11
11	(Japan) Jun Mizutani	11	7	6	7	6
(Denmark) Jonathan Groth	11	11	11	12
(India) Achanta Sharath Kamal	7	7	2	10
(Sweden) Mattias Karlsson	11	9	5	3	8
(China) Zhou Yu	7	11	11	11	11
12	(South Korea) Lee Sang-su	8	5	5	3
4	(China) Xu Xin	11	11	11	11

Quarterfinals
1	(China) Fan Zhendong	9	11	12	11	14
(Denmark) Jonathan Groth	11	6	10	3	12
(China) Zhou Yu	5	12	5	11	11	12	8
4	(China) Xu Xin	11	10	11	13	6	10	11

Semifinals
1	(China) Fan Zhendong	11	7	11	11	11
4	(China) Xu Xin	6	11	8	9	9

==== Bottom half ====
First round
3	(China) Lin Gaoyuan	14	11	11	11
(Iran) Noshad Alamian	12	6	5	7
(China) Fang Bo	11	11	9	13	10	11	11
10	(Chinese Taipei) Chuang Chih-yuan	9	4	11	15	12	7	7
9	(Portugal) Marcos Freitas	8	14	7	11	11	2
(Ukraine) Kou Lei	11	16	11	5	8	11
(Germany) Benedikt Duda	7	12	6	12	11	11	4
6	(Hong Kong) Wong Chun Ting	11	10	11	10	13	7	11
8	(Japan) Tomokazu Harimoto	11	11	11	6	6	11
(Italy) Mihai Bobocica	5	7	6	11	11	3
(India) Sathiyan Gnanasekaran	6	11	2	12	10	11	11
15	(Japan) Yuya Oshima	11	5	11	10	12	4	8
13	(Brazil) Hugo Calderano	11	11	11	11	11
(South Korea) Lim Jong-hoon	1	7	9	13	5
(Chinese Taipei) Lin Yun-ju	14	5	6	3	5
2	(Germany) Timo Boll	12	11	11	11	11

Second round
3	(China) Lin Gaoyuan	w/o
(China) Fang Bo
(Ukraine) Kou Lei	11	5	9	8	4
6	(Hong Kong) Wong Chun Ting	6	11	11	11	11
8	(Japan) Tomokazu Harimoto	7	8	11	11	8	11	11
(India) Sathiyan Gnanasekaran	11	11	8	7	11	1	4
13	(Brazil) Hugo Calderano	11	11	11	7	12
2	(Germany) Timo Boll	9	9	8	11	10

Quarterfinals
3	(China) Lin Gaoyuan	11	11	11	11
6	(Hong Kong) Wong Chun Ting	7	4	7	7
8	(Japan) Tomokazu Harimoto	5	6	6	7
13	(Brazil) Hugo Calderano	11	11	11	11

Semifinals
3	(China) Lin Gaoyuan	9	8	3	6
13	(Brazil) Hugo Calderano	11	11	11	11

==== Finals ====
Semifinals							Final
1	(China) Fan Zhendong	11	7	11	11	11
4	(China) Xu Xin	6	11	8	9	9	1	(China) Fan Zhendong	13	12	11	11
3	(China) Lin Gaoyuan	9	8	3	6		13	(Brazil) Hugo Calderano	11	10	7	7
13	(Brazil) Hugo Calderano	11	11	11	11

== Women's singles ==
=== Seeds ===
1. (China) Chen Meng (semifinals)
2. (China) Zhu Yuling (first round)
3. (Singapore) Feng Tianwei (second round)
4. (Japan) Kasumi Ishikawa (semifinals)
5. (China) Wang Manyu (final)
6. (Japan) Mima Ito (first round)
7. (Japan) Miu Hirano (quarterfinals)
8. (Chinese Taipei) Cheng I-ching (second round)
9. (Hong Kong) Doo Hoi Kem (first round)
10. (Chinese Taipei) Chen Szu-yu (first round)
11. (China) Chen Xingtong (second round)
12. (Hong Kong) Lee Ho Ching (second round)
13. (Japan) Hina Hayata (second round)
14. (Japan) Miyu Kato (second round)
15. (Japan) Sakura Mori (first round)
16. (South Korea) Seo Hyo-won (first round)

=== Draw ===
==== Top half ====
First round
1	(China) Chen Meng	6	11	11	11	11
(Monaco) Yang Xiaoxin	11	6	8	5	2
(China) Ding Ning	11	11	4	11	11
16	(South Korea) Seo Hyo-won	6	5	11	4	4
12	(Hong Kong) Lee Ho Ching	11	11	11	11	11	11
(Japan) Saki Shibata	5	9	4	13	13	3
(China) Wang Yidi	11	4	8	11	11	9	11
6	(Japan) Mima Ito	7	11	11	7	4	11	4
5	(China) Wang Manyu	12	11	11	11
(China) Che Xiaoxi	10	3	5	6
(Japan) Honoka Hashimoto	8	11	3	11	7	11	9
14	(Japan) Miyu Kato	11	8	11	6	11	6	11
9	(Hong Kong) Doo Hoi Kem	5	7	7	9
(China) Sun Yingsha	11	11	11	11
(South Korea) Yoo Eun-chong	11	14	9	7	5
3	(Singapore) Feng Tianwei	8	16	11	11	11

Second round
1	(China) Chen Meng	11	9	11	17	11
(China) Ding Ning	8	11	5	15	6
12	(Hong Kong) Lee Ho Ching	8	13	9	9
(China) Wang Yidi	11	15	11	11
5	(China) Wang Manyu	11	11	11	12
14	(Japan) Miyu Kato	5	9	8	10
(China) Sun Yingsha	5	11	14	11	11	11
3	(Singapore) Feng Tianwei	11	6	12	7	13	4

Quarterfinals
1	(China) Chen Meng	12	11	18	11
(China) Wang Yidi	10	8	16	6
5	(China) Wang Manyu	5	11	11	11	11
(China) Sun Yingsha	11	4	5	5	2

Semifinals
1	(China) Chen Meng	8	6	11	8	7
5	(China) Wang Manyu	11	11	9	11	11

==== Bottom half ====
First round
4	(Japan) Kasumi Ishikawa	11	11	11	11
(Portugal) Yu Fu	5	8	7	4
(Japan) Miyu Nagasaki	11	11	12	11	11
15	(Japan) Sakura Mori	13	6	10	9	9
13	(Japan) Hina Hayata	11	11	11	11
(Singapore) Zeng Jian	9	6	8	4
(China) Chen Ke	11	9	8	9
7	(Japan) Miu Hirano	13	11	11	11
8	(Chinese Taipei) Cheng I-ching	11	11	11	8	11
(Romania) Bernadette Szőcs	6	9	9	11	5
(Japan) Hitomi Sato	11	11	8	11	11
10	(Chinese Taipei) Chen Szu-yu	3	7	11	2	7
11	(China) Chen Xingtong	8	11	11	13	11
(China) Zhang Rui	1	4	7	11	4
(China) Liu Shiwen	12	11	11	8	11	11
2	(China) Zhu Yuling	14	5	4	11	5	5

Second round
4	(Japan) Kasumi Ishikawa	11	11	3	11	6	11
(Japan) Miyu Nagasaki	6	4	11	4	11	8
13	(Japan) Hina Hayata	10	11	10	11
7	(Japan) Miu Hirano	12	13	12	13
8	(Chinese Taipei) Cheng I-ching	8	12	11	6	11
(Japan) Hitomi Sato	11	14	6	11	13
11	(China) Chen Xingtong	10	11	11	8	7	11	9
(China) Liu Shiwen	12	9	6	11	11	7	11

Quarterfinals
4	(Japan) Kasumi Ishikawa	9	14	7	11	11	13
7	(Japan) Miu Hirano	11	12	11	9	9	11
(Japan) Hitomi Sato	12	5	2	5	5
(China) Liu Shiwen	10	11	11	11	11

Semifinals
4	(Japan) Kasumi Ishikawa	5	11	8	7	4
(China) Liu Shiwen	11	7	11	11	11

==== Finals ====
Semifinals							Final
1	(China) Chen Meng	8	6	11	8	7
5	(China) Wang Manyu	11	11	9	11	11	5	(China) Wang Manyu	11	12	9	6	5	6
4	(Japan) Kasumi Ishikawa	5	11	8	7	4		(China) Liu Shiwen	8	10	11	11	11	11
	(China) Liu Shiwen	11	7	11	11	11

== Men's doubles ==
=== Seeds ===
1. (Hong Kong) Ho Kwan Kit / Wong Chun Ting (first round)
2. (China) Fan Zhendong / Xu Xin (champions)
3. (Germany) Patrick Franziska / (Denmark) Jonathan Groth (quarterfinals)
4. (Japan) Tomokazu Harimoto / Masataka Morizono (first round)
5. (Sweden) Kristian Karlsson / Mattias Karlsson (first round)
6. (Germany) Ruwen Filus / Ricardo Walther (quarterfinals)
7. (South Korea) Jung Young-sik / Lee Sang-su (semifinals)
8. (Qatar) Mohammed Abdulwahhab / Abdulrahman Al-Naggar (first round)

=== Draw ===
First round
1	(Hong Kong) Ho / Wong	4	6	16	14
(China) Fang / Lin	11	11	14	16
(India) Achanta / Gnanasekaran	11	11	8	8	11
5	(Sweden) K. Karlsson / M. Karlsson	8	6	8	8	4
6	(Germany) Filus / Walther	11	11	12
(Ukraine) Kou / (Belgium) Nuytinck	9	3	10
(Japan) Mizutani / Oshima	11	11	11
4	(Japan) Harimoto / Morizono	7	9	7
3	(Germany) Franziska / (Denmark) Groth	11	11	11
(Brazil) Calderano / (France) Gauzy	4	7	9
(Chinese Taipei) Chen / Chuang	7	5	8
7	(South Korea) Jung / Lee	11	11	11
8	(Qatar) Abdulwahhab / Al-Naggar	4	4	7
(Austria) Gardos / Habesohn	11	11	11
(Hong Kong) Lam / Ng	8	12	12	7	5
2	(China) Fan / Xu	11	10	10	11	11

Quarterfinals
(China) Fang / Lin	10	12	11	12
(India) Achanta / Gnanasekaran	12	10	1	10
6	(Germany) Filus / Walther	5	11	4	6
(Japan) Mizutani / Oshima	11	9	11	11
3	(Germany) Franziska / (Denmark) Groth	2	8	13	11	9
7	(South Korea) Jung / Lee	11	11	11	8	11
(Austria) Gardos / Habesohn	8	12	12	7	5
2	(China) Fan / Xu	11	10	10	11	11

Semifinals
(China) Fang / Lin
(Japan) Mizutani / Oshima	w/o
7	(South Korea) Jung / Lee	4	8	4
2	(China) Fan / Xu	11	11	11

Final
(Japan) Mizutani / Oshima	11	5	9	11
2	(China) Fan / Xu	9	11	11	13

== Women's doubles ==
=== Seeds ===
1. (Japan) Honoka Hashimoto / Hitomi Sato (semifinals)
2. (Hong Kong) Doo Hoi Kem / Lee Ho Ching (semifinals)
3. (South Korea) Jeon Ji-hee / Yang Ha-eun (quarterfinals)
4. (China) Chen Xingtong / Sun Yingsha (final)
5. (Japan) Miu Hirano / Mima Ito (quarterfinals)
6. (Hong Kong) Ng Wing Nam / Soo Wai Yam Minnie (first round)
7. (India) Manika Batra / Mouma Das (quarterfinals)
8. (China) Chen Ke / Wang Manyu (champions)

=== Draw ===
First round
1	(Japan) Hashimoto / Sato	11	11	11	7	11
(South Korea) Choi / Kim	13	3	8	11	8
(Singapore) Feng / Yu	13	14	8	11	11
6	(Hong Kong) Ng / Soo	15	10	11	4	9
8	(China) Chen / Wang	11	11	10	11
(Russia) Noskova / (Austria) Polcanova	7	7	12	5
(Thailand) J. Sawettabut / S. Sawettabut	8	11	10	11	10
3	(South Korea) Jeon / Yang	11	7	12	9	12
4	(China) Chen / Sun	6	14	11	11	11
(Romania) Samara / Szőcs	11	12	8	13	5
(Sweden) Ekholm / Li	6	12	9	9
5	(Japan) Hirano / Ito	11	10	11	11
7	(India) Batra / Das	15	11	11
(Thailand) Khetkhuan / (Czech Republic) Mynářová	13	9	3
(Slovakia) Balážová / (Czech Republic) Matelová	11	7	8	8
2	(Hong Kong) Doo / Lee	8	11	11	11

Quarterfinals
1	(Japan) Hashimoto / Sato	5	12	11	5	13
(Singapore) Feng / Yu	11	10	9	11	11
8	(China) Chen / Wang	11	14	8	11	12
3	(South Korea) Jeon / Yang	6	16	11	7	10
4	(China) Chen / Sun	11	8	6	11	11
5	(Japan) Hirano / Ito	5	11	11	7	8
7	(India) Batra / Das	6	3	9
2	(Hong Kong) Doo / Lee	11	11	11

Semifinals
1	(Japan) Hashimoto / Sato	7	11	5	12	11
8	(China) Chen / Wang	11	9	11	10	13
4	(China) Chen / Sun	7	11	11	13
2	(Hong Kong) Doo / Lee	11	5	5	11

Final
8	(China) Chen / Wang	8	11	11	11
4	(China) Chen / Sun	11	2	4	4
