= 2010 Asian Junior and Cadet Table Tennis Championships =

Tournament details
- Dates: 21–25 July 2010
- Edition: 16th
- Venue: Fashion Island Shopping Mall
- Location: Bangkok, Thailand

The 16th Asian Junior Table Tennis Championships 2010 were held in Bangkok, Thailand, from 21 to 25 July 2010. It was organised by the Table Tennis Association of Thailand under the authority of the Asian Table Tennis Union (ATTU).

== Medal summary ==
=== Events ===
Event	Gold	Silver	Bronze
Junior boys' singles	China; Zhou Yu	China; Wu Jiaji	China; Lin Gaoyuan
Junior boys' singles	China; Zhou Yu	China; Wu Jiaji	India; Sathiyan Gnanasekaran
Junior girls' singles	China; Gu Yuting	China; Zhu Yuling	China; Zhao Yan
Junior girls' singles	China; Gu Yuting	China; Zhu Yuling	Chinese Taipei; Cheng I-Ching
Junior boys' doubles	Japan; Koki Niwa; Asuka Machi	Japan; Yuki Hirano; Masaki Yoshida	China; Zhou Yu; Wu Jiaji
Junior boys' doubles	Japan; Koki Niwa; Asuka Machi	Japan; Yuki Hirano; Masaki Yoshida	China; Yin Hang; Lin Gaoyuan
Junior girls' doubles	China; Yi Fangxian; Zhao Yan	China; Gu Yuting; Zhu Yuling	Japan; Misaki Morizono; Ayuka Tanioka
Junior girls' doubles	China; Yi Fangxian; Zhao Yan	China; Gu Yuting; Zhu Yuling	(South Korea) South Korea; Lee Soo jin Song Maeum
Junior boys' team	China; Lin Gaoyuan; Wu Jiaji; Yin Hang; Zhou Yu	Japan; Koki Niwa; Asuka Machi; Yuki Hirano; Masaki Yoshida	India; Sathiyan Gnanasekaran; Soumyajit Ghosh; Harmeet Desai; Sourav Saha
Junior boys' team	China; Lin Gaoyuan; Wu Jiaji; Yin Hang; Zhou Yu	Japan; Koki Niwa; Asuka Machi; Yuki Hirano; Masaki Yoshida	Chinese Taipei; Hung Tzu-Hsiang; Wang Li Chung-Yi; Fu En-Ti; Lee Chun-Lin
Junior girls' team	China; Gu Yuting; Yi Fangxian; Zhu Yuling; Zhao Yan	Japan; Misaki Morizono; Ayuka Tanioka; Miyu Maeda; Rika Suzuki	(South Korea) South Korea; Yang Ha Eun; Song Maeum; Lee Soo jin Kim Kyung Min
Junior girls' team	China; Gu Yuting; Yi Fangxian; Zhu Yuling; Zhao Yan	Japan; Misaki Morizono; Ayuka Tanioka; Miyu Maeda; Rika Suzuki	North Korea; Pak Song mi Ri Hyon sim Ri Myong sun
Cadet boys' singles	South Korea; Jang Woojin	China; Zhu Linfeng	Japan; Yuto Maramatsu
Cadet boys' singles	South Korea; Jang Woojin	China; Zhu Linfeng	South Korea; Kim Minhyeok
Cadet girls' singles	China; Liu Xi	China; Li Yanjin	Hong Kong; Doo Hoi Kem
Cadet girls' singles	China; Liu Xi	China; Li Yanjin	Hong Kong; Ng Ka Yee
Cadet boys' team	China; Xu Chenhao; Zhu Linfeng	Japan; Yuto Maramatsu; Asuka Sakai	Chinese Taipei; Lee Chia-sheng; Wen Wei-chieh
Cadet boys' team	China; Xu Chenhao; Zhu Linfeng	Japan; Yuto Maramatsu; Asuka Sakai	(South Korea) South Korea; Choi Deokhwa; Jang Woojin; Kim Minhyeok
Cadet girls' team	China; Li Yanjin; Liu Xi	Hong Kong; Ng Ka Yee; Doo Hoi Kem; Wong Chung Wan	Chinese Taipei; Huang Hsin; Chin Hsiao-Chun
Cadet girls' team	China; Li Yanjin; Liu Xi	Hong Kong; Ng Ka Yee; Doo Hoi Kem; Wong Chung Wan	Thailand; Tamolwan Khetkuen; Piyaporn Pannak; Laksika Thongsub

=== Medal table ===
* Host nation (Thailand)

Rank	Nation	Gold	Silver	Bronze	Total
1	China	8	5	4	17
2	Japan	1	4	2	7
3	South Korea	1	0	4	5
4	Hong Kong	0	1	2	3
5	Chinese Taipei	0	0	4	4
6	India	0	0	2	2
7	North Korea	0	0	1	1
7	Thailand*	0	0	1	1
Totals (8 entries)		10	10	20	40

== See also ==
- 2010 World Junior Table Tennis Championships
- Asian Table Tennis Championships
- Asian Table Tennis Union
