= 2017 Marvellous 12 =

- Date: 3–10 March
- Edition: 1st
- Location: Shenzhen, China
- Venue: Shenzhen Gymnasium
Marvellous 12	· 2019 →

The 2017 Marvellous 12 (Chinese: 2017地表最强12人) was a qualifying event organized by the Chinese Table Tennis Association, Tencent Sports and Shenzhen Municipal Culture, Sports and Tourism Bureau. It was held in Shenzhen, China from 3 to 10 March 2017. It was the first edition of the tournament. Winners of Phase 1 and Phase 3 of the men's and women's singles event, namely Fan Zhendong, Lin Gaoyuan, Liu Shiwen, and Ding Ning, were each guaranteed a spot to represent China in the 2017 World Table Tennis Championships.

== Format and participants ==
Each event consists of three phases. In Phase 1, twelve players of each event compete in a Round-Robin format and the winners qualify to the World Championships. In Phase 2, an additional player will replace the qualified player. The players would then be divided into 3 groups of 4 players. Each group plays in single-elimination format. In Phase 3, three group winners of Phase 2 compete in a Round-Robin format and the winner qualifies to the World Championships.

=== Men's singles ===
- Ma Long
- Zhang Jike
- Fan Zhendong
- Xu Xin
- Xu Chenhao
- Fang Bo
- Liang Jingkun
- Zhou Yu
- Yan An
- Liu Dingshuo
- Lin Gaoyuan
- Zhou Qihao
- Shang Kun (entered Phase 2)
- Zhou Kai (replaced Zhang Jike in Phase 2)

=== Women's singles ===
- Ding Ning
- Liu Shiwen
- Zhu Yuling
- Wu Yang
- Wang Manyu
- Gu Yuting
- Chen Meng
- Li Jiayi
- Chen Ke
- Yuan Xuejiao
- Mu Zi
- Feng Yalan
- Che Xiaoxi (entered Phase 2)

== Events ==
=== Men's singles ===
==== Phase 1 ====
Pos	Team	Pld	W	L	Pts	Qualification
1	Fan Zhendong	11	9	2	20	2017 World Championships
2	Ma Long	11	9	2	20	
3	Lin Gaoyuan	11	8	3	19	
4	Xu Xin	11	8	3	19	
5	Liang Jingkun	11	6	5	17	
6	Zhou Qihao	11	6	5	17	
7	Zhou Yu	11	5	6	16	
8	Xu Chenhao	11	4	7	15	
9	Yan An	11	4	7	15	
10	Liu Dingshuo	11	3	8	14	
11	Fang Bo	11	2	9	13	
12	Zhang Jike	6	2	4	8	

Notes:

1. Fan Zhendong won this Phase with a head-to-head record of 2-1 against Ma Long.
2. Zhang Jike withdrew due to injury after 6 matches and was then replaced by Zhou Kai in Phase 2.

==== Phase 2 ====
Round 1
Xu Xin	2
Fang Bo	1
Xu Chenhao	2
Liang Jingkun	0

Round 2
Xu Xin	2
Xu Chenhao	0

Round 1
Lin Gaoyuan	2
Shang Kun	0
Yan An	2
Zhou Qihao	1

Round 2
Lin Gaoyuan	2
Yan An	0

Round 1
Ma Long	2
Zhou Kai	0
Zhou Yu	2
Liu Dingshuo	0

Round 2
Ma Long	0
Zhou Yu	2

==== Phase 3 ====
Pos	Team	Pld	W	L	Pts	Qualification
1	Lin Gaoyuan	2	2	0	4	2017 World Championships
2	Xu Xin	2	1	1	3	
3	Zhou Yu	2	0	2	2	

=== Women's singles ===
==== Phase 1 ====
Pos	Team	Pld	W	L	Pts	Qualification
1	Liu Shiwen	11	11	0	22	2017 World Championships
2	Ding Ning	11	9	2	20	
3	Chen Meng	11	6	5	17	
4	Feng Yalan	11	6	5	17	
5	Mu Zi	11	6	5	17	
6	Zhu Yuling	11	5	6	16	
7	Chen Ke	11	4	7	15	
8	Li Jiayi	11	4	7	15	
9	Wang Manyu	11	4	7	15	
10	Yuan Xuejiao	11	4	7	15	
11	Wu Yang	11	4	7	15	
12	Gu Yuting	11	3	8	14	

==== Phase 2 ====
Round 1
Chen Meng	2
Wu Yang	1
Mu Zi	2
Yuan Xuejiao	1

Round 2
Chen Meng	2
Mu Zi	1

Round 1
Ding Ning	2
Gu Yuting	0
Wang Manyu	2
Chen Ke	1

Round 2
Ding Ning	2
Wang Manyu	0

Round 1
Feng Yalan	2
Che Xiaoxi	0
Zhu Yuling	2
Li Jiayi	0

Round 2
Feng Yalan	2
Zhu Yuling	0

==== Phase 3 ====
Pos	Team	Pld	W	L	Pts	Qualification
1	Ding Ning	2	2	0	4	2017 World Championships
2	Chen Meng	2	1	1	3	
3	Feng Yalan	2	0	2	2	
