= Road to Düsseldorf 2017 =

Road to Düsseldorf（直通杜塞尔多夫）is a qualifying competition in China national table tennis team in order to test and select players to participate the 2017 World Table Tennis Championships held by Düsseldorf, Germany in May 2017.

== Men's team ==
=== Entrants ===
- Players who have won enough world champions on singles events can bye to the third round.
- Players who lack of enough world champion on singles events or missed the first round because of participating the Hungarian Open can bye to the second round.
- Other first team players must compete in the first round.

Bye to the third round
1. Ma Long
2. Zhang Jike
Bye to the second round
3. Lin Gaoyuan
4. Yan An
5. Zhou Yu
6. Shang Kun
7. Fan Zhendong
8. Liang Jingkun
9. Fang Bo
10. Xu Xin (P)
Competing in the first round
11. Ren Hao
12. Lai Jiaxin
13. Chen Xin
14. Wang Chuqin
15. Ma Te (C)
16. Yu Ziyang
17. Liu Jikang
18. Zhou Kai
19. Liu Yi (C)
20. Xue Fei (P)
21. Cui Qinglei
22. Zhu Linfeng
23. Liu Dingshuo
24. Zheng Peifeng (P)
25. Zhou Qihao
26. Xu Chenhao

=== First round ===
Duration: 18–21 January
Formation: Round robin; Best of five; Top 6 qualify to the second round.

Rank	Name	Age	Win	Lose	Points	Notes
1	Yu Ziyang	19	11	3	26	Qualified to the second round
2	Zhou Qihao	20	11	3	25	Qualified to the second round
3	Xu Chenhao	22	10	4	24	Qualified to the second round
4	Liu Dingshuo	19	10	4	23	Qualified to the second round
5	Zhou Kai	21	10	4	22	Qualified to the second round
6	Wang Chuqin	17	8	6	22	Qualified to the second round
7	Zhu Linfeng	21	7	7	21	
8	Ren Hao	22	7	7	21	
9	Ma Te (C)	21	6	8	20	
10	Zheng Peifeng (P)	21	6	8	20	
11	Xue Fei (P)	18	5	9	19	
12	Liu Jikang	26	5	9	19	
13	Liu Yi (C)	25	4	10	18	
14	Cui Qinglei	28	3	11	17	
15	Chen Xin	21	3	11	17	
16	Lai Jiaxin	22				DNP

=== Second round ===
Duration: 8–11 February
Formation: Round robin; Best of three; Top 8 and 2 resurrected players coaches determine qualify to the third round. Top of the rest players will be the alternate of the third round.

Rank	Name	Age	Win	Lose	Points	Notes
1	Fan Zhendong	20	10	3	23	Qualified to the third round
2	Xu Xin (P)	27	9	4	23	Qualified to the third round
3	Xu Chenhao	22	8	5	21	Qualified to the third round
4	Fang Bo	25	8	5	21	Qualified to the third round
5	Liang Jingkun	21	8	5	21	Qualified to the third round
6	Zhou Yu	25	8	5	21	Qualified to the third round
7	Yan An	24	7	6	20	Qualified to the third round
8	Liu Dingshuo	19	7	6	20	Qualified to the third round
9	Lin Gaoyuan	22	6	7	19	Resurrected to the third round
10	Zhou Qihao	20	6	7	19	Resurrected to the third round
11	Shang Kun	27	4	9	17	Alternate to the second stage of the third round
12	Zhou Kai	21	4	9	17	Alternate to the second stage of the third round due to Zhang Jike's injury
13	Yu Ziyang	19	3	10	16	
14	Wang Chuqin	17	2	11	15	

=== Third round ===
Duration: 3–10 March
Formation: Round robin for the first stage, groups and round robin for the second stage; Best of three; The first stage includes top 10 of the second round, Ma Long and Zhang Jike, the winner qualify to Düsseldorf; The second stage include the rest 11 players and the alternate, they will be divided into 6 pairs, and each pair winner play the round robin to get the last one quota to Düsseldorf.

==== First stage ====
Rank	Name	Age	Win	Lose	Points	Notes
1	Fan Zhendong	20	9	2	20	Qualified to Düsseldorf
2	Ma Long	29	9	2	20	Seeded 1 in the second stage
3	Lin Gaoyuan	22	8	3	19	Seeded 2 in the second stage
4	Xu Xin (P)	27	8	3	19	Seeded 3 in the second stage
5	Liang Jingkun	21	6	5	17	Seeded 4 in the second stage
6	Zhou Qihao	20	6	5	17	Seeded 5 in the second stage
7	Zhou Yu	25	5	6	16	Seeded 6 in the second stage
8	Yan An	24	4	7	15	Seeded 7 in the second stage
9	Xu Chenhao	22	4	7	16	Seeded 8 in the second stage
10	Liu Dingshuo	19	3	8	14	Seeded 9 in the second stage
11	Fang Bo	25	2	9	13	Seeded 10 in the second stage
12	Zhang Jike	29	2	9	8	Withdrawn due to injury

==== Second stage ====
===== Group A knockout =====
9 March	Xu Xin (P)	2–0	Fang Bo

9 March	Xu Chenhao	2–1	Liang Jingkun

9 March	Xu Xin (P)	2–0	Xu Chenhao

===== Group B knockout =====
9 March	Lin Gaoyuan	2–0	Shang Kun (A)

9 March	Yan An	2–1	Zhou Qihao

9 March	Lin Gaoyuan	2–0	Yan An

===== Group C knockout =====
9 March	Ma Long	2–0	Zhou Kai (A)

9 March	Liu Dingshuo	0–2	Zhou Yu

9 March	Ma Long (withdrawn)	0–2	Zhou Yu

===== Final round robin =====
Rank	Name	Age	Win	Lose	Notes
1	Lin Gaoyuan	22	2	0	Qualified to Düsseldorf
2	Xu Xin (P)	27	1	1	
3	Zhou Yu	25	0	2	

== Women's team ==
=== Entrants ===
- Players who are widely considered as the main force can bye to the third round.
- Other first team players who was born after 1993 must compete in the first round.
- Players before 1993 bye to the second round.
- Players who ranked 7 - 8 in the first round will wait for the repechage, compete with the third place of the second round. The final rank of the repechage will be the order of alternates in the third round.

Bye to the third round
1. Ding Ning
2. Liu Shiwen
3. Zhu Yuling
4. Wu Yang (C)
Bye to the second round
3. Wen Jia
4. Sheng Dandan
5. Feng Yalan
6. Li Xiaodan
7. Mu Zi
Competing in the first round
11. Li Jiayi
12. Liu Fei (C)
13. Yuan Xuejiao
14. Hu Limei (C)
15. Zhang Qiang (P)
16. Che Xiaoxi
17. Wang Yidi
18. Chen Ke
19. Liu Gaoyang
20. Wang Manyu
21. Chen Xingtong
22. Gu Ruochen
23. Gu Yuting
24. Chen Meng

=== First round ===
Date: 10–13 January
Formation: Round robin; Best of five; Top 6 qualify to the third round, players ranked 7 - 8 wait for the repechage.

Rank	Name	Age	Win	Lose	Points	Notes
1	Wang Manyu	18	12	1	25	Qualified to the third round
2	Gu Yuting	22	11	2	24	Qualified to the third round
3	Chen Meng	23	10	3	23	Qualified to the third round
4	Li Jiayi	23	8	5	21	Qualified to the third round
5	Chen Ke	20	8	5	21	Qualified to the third round
6	Yuan Xuejiao	22	7	6	20	Qualified to the third round
7	Che Xiaoxi	24	7	6	20	Wait for the repechage
8	Chen Xingtong	20	6	7	19	Wait for the repechage
9	Zhang Qiang (P)	23	6	7	19	
10	Liu Gaoyang	21	5	8	18	
11	Liu Fei (C)	23	4	9	17	
12	Gu Ruochen	23	3	10	16	
13	Wang Yidi	20	2	11	15	
14	Hu Limei (C)	22	2	11	15	

=== Second round ===
Date: 11 February
Formation: Round robin; Best of five; Top 2 qualify to the third round, and the third rank player wait for the repechage.

Rank	Name	Age	Win	Lose	Points	Notes
1	Mu Zi	28	3	1	7	Qualified to the third round
2	Feng Yalan	27	3	1	7	Qualified to the third round
3	Li Xiaodan	27	3	1	7	Wait for the repechage
4	Sheng Dandan	25	1	3	5	
5	Wen Jia	28	0	4	4	

=== Repechage ===
Date: 13 February
Formation: Round robin; Best of five; The final rank of the repechage will be the order of alternates in the third round.

Rank	Name	Age	Win	Lose	GW	GL	Points	Notes
1	Che Xiaoxi	24	1	1	5	3	3	Became the first order alternate
2	Chen Xingtong	20	1	1	5	5	3	Became the second order alternate
3	Li Xiaodan	20	1	1	3	5	3	Became the third order alternate

=== Third round ===
Duration: 3–10 March
Formation: Round robin for the first stage, groups and round robin for the second stage; Best of three; The first stage include qualified player, Ding Ning, Liu Shiwen, Zhu Yuling and Wu Yang, the winner qualify to Düsseldorf; The second stage include the rest 11 players and the alternate, they will be divided into 6 pairs, and each pair winner play the round robin to get the last one quota to Düsseldorf.

==== First stage ====
Rank	Name	Age	Win	Lose	Points	Notes
1	Liu Shiwen	26	11	0	22	Qualified to Düsseldorf
2	Ding Ning	27	9	2	20	Seeded 1 in the second stage
3	Chen Meng	23	6	5	17	Seeded 2 in the second stage
4	Feng Yalan	27	6	5	17	Seeded 3 in the second stage
5	Mu Zi	28	6	5	17	Seeded 4 in the second stage
6	Zhu Yuling	22	5	6	16	Seeded 5 in the second stage
7	Wu Yang	25	4	7	15	Seeded 6 in the second stage
8	Yuan Xuejiao	22	4	7	15	Seeded 7 in the second stage
9	Chen Ke	20	4	7	15	Seeded 8 in the second stage
10	Wang Manyu	18	4	7	15	Seeded 9 in the second stage
11	Gu Yuting	22	3	8	14	Seeded 10 in the second stage
12	Li Jiayi	23	2	9	13	Seeded 11 in the second stage

==== Second stage ====
===== Group A knockout =====
9 March	Chen Meng	2–1	Wu Yang (C)

9 March	Yuan Xuejiao	1–2	Mu Zi

9 March	Chen Meng	2–1	Mu Zi

===== Group B knockout =====
9 March	Ding Ning	2–0	Gu Yuting

9 March	Wang Manyu	2–1	Chen Ke

9 March	Ding Ning	2–0	Wang Manyu

===== Group C knockout =====
9 March	Feng Yalan	2–0	Che Xiaoxi (A)

9 March	Li Jiayi	0–2	Zhu Yuling

9 March	Feng Yalan	2–0	Zhu Yuling

===== Final round robin =====
Rank	Name	Age	Win	Lose	Notes
1	Ding Ning	27	2	0	Qualified to Düsseldorf
2	Chen Meng	23	1	1	
3	Feng Yalan	27	0	2	

Notes:
(C)=Chopping style.
(P)=Penhold grip.
(A)=Alternate player.
GW=Game won.
GL=Game lost.
DNP=Did not play.
