= 2019 Marvellous 12 =

- Date: 28 Feb–3 March
- Edition: 2nd
- Location: Shenzhen, China
- Venue: Bao'an Sports Center
← 2017 ·	Marvellous 12	· TBA →

The 2019 Marvellous 12 (Chinese: 2019地表最强12人直通赛) was a qualifying event organized by the Chinese Table Tennis Association, Tencent Sports and Shenzhen Municipal Culture, Sports and Tourism Bureau. It will be held in Shenzhen, China from 28 February to 3 March, 2019. It was the second edition of the tournament, and the second time that it have been held in Shenzhen. Winners and runners-up of the men's and women's singles event, namely Fan Zhendong, Liang Jingkun, Chen Meng, and Sun Yingsha, was each guaranteed a spot to represent China in the 2019 World Table Tennis Championships.

== Format and participants ==
Six top ranked men and women players in China automatically qualify to the events. Six additional players to each event were decided in a closed competition held from 12 to 17 February. Twelve players in each event compete in a Round-Robin format. The winners of each event qualify to the single's event of the World Championships, while the runners-up are each guaranteed a spot in the team's final squad.

=== Men's singles ===
- ~~Ma Long~~ (withdrew due to injury)
- Fan Zhendong
- Xu Xin
- Wang Chuqin
- Lin Gaoyuan
- Liang Jingkun
- Fang Bo
- Xu Chenhao
- Zhou Kai
- Zhao Zihao
- Yu Ziyang
- Xue Fei
- Yan An (replaced Ma Long)

=== Women's singles ===
- Ding Ning
- Liu Shiwen
- Zhu Yuling
- Chen Meng
- Wang Manyu
- Wu Yang
- Gu Yuting
- Sun Yingsha
- Wang Yidi
- Sun Mingyang
- He Zhuojia
- Chen Xingtong

== Events ==
=== Men's singles ===
Pos	Team	Pld	W	L	GW	GL	Pts	Qualification
1	Fan Zhendong	11	11	0	33	11	22	2019 World Championships
2	Liang Jingkun	11	8	3	28	18	19	2019 World Championships
3	Xue Fei	11	6	5	25	23	17	
4	Lin Gaoyuan	11	5	6	26	25	16	
5	Xu Xin	11	5	6	21	20	16	
6	Yu Ziyang	11	5	6	20	23	16	
7	Fang Bo	11	5	6	21	24	16	
8	Yan An	11	5	6	21	24	16	
9	Zhou Kai	11	5	6	18	25	16	
10	Wang Chuqin	11	4	7	17	23	15	
11	Xu Chenhao	11	4	7	20	27	15	
12	Zhao Zihao	11	3	8	19	26	14	

=== Women's singles ===
Pos	Team	Pld	W	L	GW	GL	Pts	Qualification
1	Chen Meng	11	10	1	32	13	21	2019 World Championships
2	Sun Yingsha	11	8	3	29	18	19	2019 World Championships
3	Ding Ning	11	8	3	28	18	19	
4	Wang Manyu	11	7	4	28	20	18	
5	Liu Shiwen	11	6	5	23	20	17	
6	Zhu Yuling	11	6	5	24	22	17	
7	Wang Yidi	11	6	5	22	23	17	
8	Chen Xingtong	11	5	6	24	24	16	
9	Wu Yang	11	4	7	17	23	15	
10	Sun Mingyang	11	4	7	17	25	15	
11	Gu Yuting	11	1	10	15	30	12	
12	He Zhuojia	11	1	10	9	32	12	
