= 2011 Asian Junior and Cadet Table Tennis Championships =

Tournament details
- Dates: 20–24 July 2011
- Edition: 17th
- Venue: Thyagraj Indoor Stadium
- Location: New Delhi, India

The 17th Asian Junior Table Tennis Championships 2011 were held in Jiangyin, India, from 20 to 24 July 2011. It was organised by the Table Tennis Federation of India (TTFI) under the authority of the Asian Table Tennis Union (ATTU).

== Medal summary ==
=== Events ===
Event	Gold	Silver	Bronze
Junior boys' singles	Japan; Maharu Yoshimura	China; Yin Hang	China; Lin Gaoyuan
Junior boys' singles	Japan; Maharu Yoshimura	China; Yin Hang	China; Wu Jiaji
Junior girls' singles	China; Zhu Yuling	China; Zhao Yan	China; Gu Yuting
Junior girls' singles	China; Zhu Yuling	China; Zhao Yan	Japan; Ayuka Tanioka
Junior boys' doubles	China; Lin Gaoyuan; Wu Jiaji	Japan; Maharu Yoshimura; Asuka Sakai	Chinese Taipei; Lai Yi-Yao; Hsu Chia-Liang
Junior boys' doubles	China; Lin Gaoyuan; Wu Jiaji	Japan; Maharu Yoshimura; Asuka Sakai	Chinese Taipei; Hung Tzu-Hsiang; Lee Chia-Sheng
Junior girls' doubles	China; Gu Yuting; Zhu Yuling	China; Zhao Yan; Gu Ruochen	Japan; Eka So; Natsumi Miyake
Junior girls' doubles	China; Gu Yuting; Zhu Yuling	China; Zhao Yan; Gu Ruochen	Singapore; Li Isabelle Siyun; Chau Hai Qing
Junior boys' team	China; Yin Hang; Lin Gaoyuan; Wu Jiaji; Cai Wei	Japan; Maharu Yoshimura; Yuto Muramatsu; Asuka Sakai; Yuto Higashi	India; Sathiyan Gnanasekaran; Sourav Saha; Soumyajit Ghosh; Harmeet Desai
Junior boys' team	China; Yin Hang; Lin Gaoyuan; Wu Jiaji; Cai Wei	Japan; Maharu Yoshimura; Yuto Muramatsu; Asuka Sakai; Yuto Higashi	South Korea; Kim Dong Hyun; Cheon Min Hyuck; Cho Jae Jun; Choi Deok Hwa
Junior girls' team	China; Gu Yuting; Zhu Yuling; Zhao Yan; Gu Ruochen	South Korea; Choi Jung Min; Kang Haneul; Lee Dasom; Yang Ha Eun	Chinese Taipei; Chen Szu-Yu; Chen Chin-Wen; Chang Ya-Chuan; Yeh Tong-Yi
Junior girls' team	China; Gu Yuting; Zhu Yuling; Zhao Yan; Gu Ruochen	South Korea; Choi Jung Min; Kang Haneul; Lee Dasom; Yang Ha Eun	Japan; Ayuka Tanioka; Miyu Maeda; Eka So; Natsumi Miyake
Cadet boys' singles	China; Zhou Qihao	China; Zhou Kai	China; Yu Ziyang
Cadet boys' singles	China; Zhou Qihao	China; Zhou Kai	India; Abhishek Yadav
Cadet girls' singles	China; Liu Gaoyang	China; Zhu Chaohui	Hong Kong; Doo Hoi Kem
Cadet girls' singles	China; Liu Gaoyang	China; Zhu Chaohui	South Korea; Kim Seoyeon
Cadet boys' team	China; Zhou Qihao; Yu Ziyang; Zhou Kai	Chinese Taipei; Liao Cheng-Ting; Yang Heng-Wei	Hong Kong; Li Hon Ming; Hung Wah Tak; Hung Ka Tak
Cadet boys' team	China; Zhou Qihao; Yu Ziyang; Zhou Kai	Chinese Taipei; Liao Cheng-Ting; Yang Heng-Wei	South Korea; Kim Min Hyeok; Lim Jonghoon; Park Jeong Woo
Cadet girls' team	China; Zhu Chaohui; Liu Gaoyang; Fan Siqi	South Korea; Kim Seoyeon; Lee Zion; Lee Seul	Chinese Taipei; Huang Yu-Wen; Hung Hung
Cadet girls' team	China; Zhu Chaohui; Liu Gaoyang; Fan Siqi	South Korea; Kim Seoyeon; Lee Zion; Lee Seul	Hong Kong; Doo Hoi Kem; Soo Wai Yam Minnie; Lam Yee Lok

=== Medal table ===
* Host nation (India)

Rank	Nation	Gold	Silver	Bronze	Total
1	China	9	5	4	18
2	Japan	1	2	3	6
3	South Korea	0	2	3	5
4	Chinese Taipei	0	1	4	5
5	Hong Kong	0	0	3	3
6	India*	0	0	2	2
7	Singapore	0	0	1	1
Totals (7 entries)		10	10	20	40

== See also ==
- 2011 World Junior Table Tennis Championships
- Asian Table Tennis Championships
- Asian Table Tennis Union
