= 2009 World Junior Table Tennis Championships =

Table tennis tournament in Colombia

Tournament details
- Dates: 9 – 16 December 2009
- Edition: 7th
- Venue: Centro de Convenciones y Exposiciones
- Location: Cartagena, Colombia

The 2009 World Junior Table Tennis Championships were held in Cartagena, Colombia, from 9 to 16 December 2009. It was organised by the Federación Colombiana de Tenis de Mesa under the auspices and authority of the International Table Tennis Federation (ITTF).

== Medal summary ==
=== Events ===
Event	Gold	Silver	Bronze
Boys' singles	China; Fang Bo	China; Yan An	China; Lin Gaoyuan
Boys' singles	China; Fang Bo	China; Yan An	China; Song Hongyuan
Girls' singles	China; Wu Yang	China; Gu Yuting	China; Cao Lisi
Girls' singles	China; Wu Yang	China; Gu Yuting	China; Chen Meng
Boys' doubles	China; Fang Bo; Song Hongyuan	China; Lin Gaoyuan; Yan An	Japan; Koki Niwa; Jin Ueda
Boys' doubles	China; Fang Bo; Song Hongyuan	China; Lin Gaoyuan; Yan An	South Korea; Jung Young-sik; Kim Min-seok
Girls' doubles	China; Chen Meng; Gu Yuting	South Korea; Yang Ha-eun; Kim Min-hee	China; Wu Yang; Cao Lisi
Girls' doubles	China; Chen Meng; Gu Yuting	South Korea; Yang Ha-eun; Kim Min-hee	Hong Kong; Lee Ho Ching; Ng Wing Nam
Mixed doubles	China; Fang Bo; Gu Yuting	Hungary; Daniel Kosiba; Dora Csilla Madarasz	China; Lin Gaoyuan; Chen Meng
Mixed doubles	China; Fang Bo; Gu Yuting	Hungary; Daniel Kosiba; Dora Csilla Madarasz	South Korea; Jung Young-sik; Kim Min-hee
Boys' team	China; Fang Bo; Yan An; Lin Gaoyuan; Song Hongyuan	Germany; Patrick Franziska; Ricardo Walther; Christoph Schmidl	Japan; Koki Niwa; Jin Ueda; Kaito Fujimoto; Kohei Morimoto
Boys' team	China; Fang Bo; Yan An; Lin Gaoyuan; Song Hongyuan	Germany; Patrick Franziska; Ricardo Walther; Christoph Schmidl	South Korea; Kim Min-seok; Jeoung Youngsik; Yoo Hoonsuk; Lee Seunghyeok
Girls' team	China; Chen Meng; Wu Yang; Gu Yuting; Cao Lisi	Japan; Misaki Morizono; Marina Matsuzawa; Megumi Okazaki; Ayuka Tanioka	Hong Kong; Lee Ho Ching; Guan Mengyuan; Ng Wing Nam; Ng Ka Yee
Girls' team	China; Chen Meng; Wu Yang; Gu Yuting; Cao Lisi	Japan; Misaki Morizono; Marina Matsuzawa; Megumi Okazaki; Ayuka Tanioka	South Korea; Yang Ha-eun; Jo Yujin; Kim Minhee; Hwang Jina

=== Medal table ===
Rank	Nation	Gold	Silver	Bronze	Total
1	China	7	3	6	16
2	South Korea	0	1	4	5
3	Japan	0	1	2	3
4	Germany	0	1	0	1
4	Hungary	0	1	0	1
6	Hong Kong	0	0	2	2
Totals (6 entries)		7	7	14	28

== See also ==
- 2009 World Table Tennis Championships
