= 2010 World Junior Table Tennis Championships =

Table tennis tournament in Slovakia

Tournament details
- Dates: 4 – 11 December 2010
- Edition: 8th
- Venue: Sibamac Arena
- Location: Bratislava, Slovakia

The 2010 World Junior Table Tennis Championships were held in Bratislava, Slovakia, from 4 to 11 December 2010. It was organised by the Slovak Table Tennis Federation under the auspices and authority of the International Table Tennis Federation (ITTF).

== Medal summary ==
=== Events ===
Event	Gold	Silver	Bronze
Boys' singles	China; Song Hongyuan	China; Lin Gaoyuan	China; Wu Jiaji
Boys' singles	China; Song Hongyuan	China; Lin Gaoyuan	China; Zhou Yu
Girls' singles	China; Zhu Yuling	Japan; Kasumi Ishikawa	China; Yi Fangxian
Girls' singles	China; Zhu Yuling	Japan; Kasumi Ishikawa	South Korea; Yang Ha-eun
Boys' doubles	Japan; Koki Niwa; Asuka Machi	France; Simon Gauzy; Quentin Robinot	China; Lin Gaoyuan; Zhou Yu
Boys' doubles	Japan; Koki Niwa; Asuka Machi	France; Simon Gauzy; Quentin Robinot	Germany; Patrick Franziska; Arne Holter
Girls' doubles	China; Gu Yuting; Zhu Yuling	Japan; Kasumi Ishikawa; Misaki Morizono	China; Yi Fangxian; Zhao Yan
Girls' doubles	China; Gu Yuting; Zhu Yuling	Japan; Kasumi Ishikawa; Misaki Morizono	Japan; Miyu Maeda; Ayuka Tanioka
Mixed doubles	China; Wu Jiaji; Gu Yuting	China; Lin Gaoyuan; Zhu Yuling	China; Zhou Yu; Yi Fangxian
Mixed doubles	China; Wu Jiaji; Gu Yuting	China; Lin Gaoyuan; Zhu Yuling	(India) Soumyajit Ghosh (Hong Kong) Ng Wing Nam
Boys' team	China; Lin Gaoyuan; Zhou Yu; Wu Jiaji; Song Hongyuan	Japan; Koki Niwa; Masaki Yoshida; Asuka Machi; Yuki Hirano	Germany; Arne Holter; Florian Wagner; Patrick Franziska; Niklas Matthias
Boys' team	China; Lin Gaoyuan; Zhou Yu; Wu Jiaji; Song Hongyuan	Japan; Koki Niwa; Masaki Yoshida; Asuka Machi; Yuki Hirano	South Korea; Cho Jaejun; Kim Jihwan; Lee Seunghyeok; Kim Donghyun
Girls' team	Japan; Misaki Morizono; Kasumi Ishikawa; Miyu Maeda; Ayuka Tanioka	China; Gu Yuting; Zhu Yuling; Yi Fangxian; Zhao Yan	Germany; Petrissa Solja; Sabine Winter; Kathrin Mühlbach; Anna Krieghoff
Girls' team	Japan; Misaki Morizono; Kasumi Ishikawa; Miyu Maeda; Ayuka Tanioka	China; Gu Yuting; Zhu Yuling; Yi Fangxian; Zhao Yan	South Korea; Yang Ha-eun; Yoo Eunchong; Park Joohyun; Jo Yujin

=== Medal table ===
Rank	Nation	Gold	Silver	Bronze	Total
1	China	5	3	6	14
2	Japan	2	3	1	6
3	France	0	1	0	1
4	Germany	0	0	3	3
4	South Korea	0	0	3	3
6	Hong Kong	0	0	0.5	0.5
6	India	0	0	0.5	0.5
Totals (7 entries)		7	7	14	28

== See also ==
- 2010 World Team Table Tennis Championships
