= 2011 World Junior Table Tennis Championships =

Table tennis tournament in Bahrain

Tournament details
- Dates: 13 – 20 November 2011
- Edition: 9th
- Venue: Isa Sports City
- Location: Manama, Bahrain

The 2011 World Junior Table Tennis Championships were held in Manama, Bahrain, from 13 to 20 November 2011. It was organised by the Bahrain Table Tennis Association under the auspices and authority of the International Table Tennis Federation (ITTF).

== Medal summary ==
=== Events ===
Event	Gold	Silver	Bronze
Boys' singles	Japan; Koki Niwa	China; Lin Gaoyuan	France; Quentin Robinot
Boys' singles	Japan; Koki Niwa	China; Lin Gaoyuan	Japan; Maharu Yoshimura
Girls' singles	China; Chen Meng	China; Zhu Yuling	China; Gu Ruochen
Girls' singles	China; Chen Meng	China; Zhu Yuling	China; Gu Yuting
Boys' doubles	China; Song Hongyuan; Zheng Peifeng	France; Simon Gauzy; Quentin Robinot	China; Lin Gaoyuan; Wu Jiaji
Boys' doubles	China; Song Hongyuan; Zheng Peifeng	France; Simon Gauzy; Quentin Robinot	Japan; Koki Niwa; Maharu Yoshimura
Girls' doubles	China; Chen Meng; Gu Yuting	China; Gu Ruochen; Zhu Yuling	Chinese Taipei; Chen Szu-yu; Cheng Hsien-tzu
Girls' doubles	China; Chen Meng; Gu Yuting	China; Gu Ruochen; Zhu Yuling	Romania; Bernadette Szőcs; Irina Ciobanu
Mixed doubles	China; Song Hongyuan; Chen Meng	China; Zheng Peifeng; Gu Yuting	China; Lin Gaoyuan; Zhu Yuling
Mixed doubles	China; Song Hongyuan; Chen Meng	China; Zheng Peifeng; Gu Yuting	China; Wu Jiaji; Gu Ruochen
Boys' team	China; Lin Gaoyuan; Song Hongyuan; Zheng Peifeng; Wu Jiaji	Japan; Yuto Muramatsu; Koki Niwa; Maharu Yoshimura; Asuka Sakai	India; Harmeet Desai; Soumyajit Ghosh; Sathiyan Gnanasekaran; Sourav Saha
Boys' team	China; Lin Gaoyuan; Song Hongyuan; Zheng Peifeng; Wu Jiaji	Japan; Yuto Muramatsu; Koki Niwa; Maharu Yoshimura; Asuka Sakai	France; Tristan Flore; Simon Gauzy; Romain Lorentz; Quentin Robinot
Girls' team	China; Chen Meng; Gu Yuting; Gu Ruochen; Zhu Yuling	Japan; Misato Niwa; Kasumi Ishikawa; Ayuka Tanioka; Miyu Maeda	Chinese Taipei; Chen Szu-Yu; Cheng Hsien-Tzu; Chen Hung-Ting; Liu Yu-Hsin
Girls' team	China; Chen Meng; Gu Yuting; Gu Ruochen; Zhu Yuling	Japan; Misato Niwa; Kasumi Ishikawa; Ayuka Tanioka; Miyu Maeda	Hong Kong; Soo Wai Yam Minnie; Ng Ka Yee; Doo Hoi Kem; Li Ching Wan

=== Medal table ===
Rank	Nation	Gold	Silver	Bronze	Total
1	China	6	4	5	15
2	Japan	1	2	2	5
3	France	0	1	2	3
4	Chinese Taipei	0	0	2	2
5	Hong Kong	0	0	1	1
5	India	0	0	1	1
5	Romania	0	0	1	1
Totals (7 entries)		7	7	14	28

== See also ==
- 2011 World Table Tennis Championships
