= Table tennis at the 2009 Asian Youth Games =

- Venue: Toa Payoh Sports Hall
- Dates: 30 June – 6 July 2009

Table tennis at the 2009 Asian Youth Games was held from 30 June to 6 July 2009 in the Toa Payoh Sports Hall in Singapore.

== Medalists ==
Event	Gold	Silver	Bronze
Boys' singles	Yin Hang; China	Cheng Jingqi; China	Koki Niwa; Japan
Boys' singles	Yin Hang; China	Cheng Jingqi; China	Kim Dong-hyun; South Korea
Girls' singles	Chen Meng; China	Gu Yuting; China	Ayuka Tanioka; Japan
Girls' singles	Chen Meng; China	Gu Yuting; China	Kim Song-i; North Korea
Mixed doubles	China; Yin Hang; Gu Yuting	China; Cheng Jingqi; Chen Meng	Japan; Asuka Machi; Rika Suzuki
Mixed doubles	China; Yin Hang; Gu Yuting	China; Cheng Jingqi; Chen Meng	South Korea; Kim Dong-hyun; Yang Ha-eun
Mixed team	China; Yin Hang; Cheng Jingqi; Chen Meng; Gu Yuting	North Korea; Kim Jin-su; Kim Song-i	Singapore; Clarence Chew; Tay Jit Kiat; Isabelle Li; Chau Hai Qing
Mixed team	China; Yin Hang; Cheng Jingqi; Chen Meng; Gu Yuting	North Korea; Kim Jin-su; Kim Song-i	Chinese Taipei; Lee Chia-sheng; Hung Tzu-hsiang; Huang Hsin; Chin Hsiao-chun

== Medal table ==
Rank	Nation	Gold	Silver	Bronze	Total
1	China (CHN)	4	3	0	7
2	North Korea (PRK)	0	1	1	2
3	Japan (JPN)	0	0	3	3
4	South Korea (KOR)	0	0	2	2
5	Chinese Taipei (TPE)	0	0	1	1
5	Singapore (SIN)	0	0	1	1
Totals (6 entries)		4	4	8	16

== Results ==
=== Boys' singles ===
Round of 64 – 4 July
Chao Long Hong (MAC)	3–1 (11–8, 4–11, 15–13, 11–6)	Timur Nagumanov (UZB)
Suchat Pitakgulsiri (THA)	3–1 (11–7, 11–8, 9–11, 11–9)	Arnab Adhikari (IND)
Ibrahim Shifan (MDV)	0–3 (6–11, 6–11, 5–11)	Husam Doufesh (PLE)
Kim Jin-su (PRK)	3–0 (11–3, 11–3, 11–6)	Hav Tang (CAM)
Baasankhüügiin Samdan (MGL)	0–3 (5–11, 7–11, 0–11)	Shashiranga Arsakulasooriya (SRI)
Lê Tuấn Anh (VIE)	3–0 (11–9, 11–4, 11–0)	Syed Anns (PAK)
Tanapol Santiwattanatarm (THA)	3–0 (11–2, 11–7, 11–7)	Tabish Khurshid (PAK)
Chao Long Chon (MAC)	1–3 (11–9, 7–11, 0–11, 6–11)	Đoàn Bá Tuấn Anh (VIE)
Tay Jit Kiat (SIN)	3–1 (11–7, 11–9, 9–11, 11–9)	Abdullah Al-Makimy (KUW)
Alireza Mollarajabi (IRI)	3–0 (11–3, 11–7, 11–4)	Elmurod Holikov (UZB)
Imantha Udanjaya (SRI)	3–2 (11–8, 11–8, 7–11, 9–11, 11–7)	Sonu Kumar Gupta (NEP)
Mönkh-Orgilyn Batbayar (MGL)	1–3 (1–11, 11–9, 7–11, 7–11)	Andreý Milowanow (TKM)
Mohammad Bseiso (PLE)	1–3 (12–10, 9–11, 6–11, 3–11)	Inthasone Yanonsa (LAO)

Round of 32 – 4 July
Yin Hang (CHN)	3–0 (11–3, 11–6, 11–6)	Meshari Al-Banai (KUW)
Chao Long Hong (MAC)	0–3 (3–11, 6–11, 6–11)	Clarence Chew (SIN)
Mohammad Ali Roueintan (IRI)	2–3 (6–11, 11–7, 6–11, 11–8, 9–11)	Suchat Pitakgulsiri (THA)
Husam Doufesh (PLE)	0–3 (5–11, 3–11, 1–11)	Jang Woo-jin (KOR)
Chiu Chung Hei (HKG)	3–2 (11–8, 5–11, 9–11, 11–8, 11–3)	Kim Jin-su (PRK)
Shashiranga Arsakulasooriya (SRI)	0–3 (4–11, 9–11, 7–11)	Hung Tzu-hsiang (TPE)
Mohamed Saleh (BRN)	0–3 (0–11, 4–11, 7–11)	Lê Tuấn Anh (VIE)
Pradip Roka (NEP)	0–3 (1–11, 5–11, 3–11)	Koki Niwa (JPN)
Kim Dong-hyun (KOR)	3–0 (11–4, 11–4, 11–7)	Tanapol Santiwattanatarm (THA)
Đoàn Bá Tuấn Anh (VIE)	3–0 (11–7, 11–8, 11–9)	Avik Das (IND)
Loay Muawadh (BRN)	1–3 (5–11, 6–11, 11–9, 8–11)	Tay Jit Kiat (SIN)
Alireza Mollarajabi (IRI)	3–1 (11–7, 6–11, 11–8, 11–7)	Asuka Machi (JPN)
Lee Chia-sheng (TPE)	3–0 (11–4, 11–8, 11–3)	Imantha Udanjaya (SRI)
Andreý Milowanow (TKM)	3–0 (11–9, 11–4, 11–6)	Kim Sovanna (CAM)
Daryl Hung (HKG)	3–1 (6–11, 11–2, 11–4, 11–6)	Inthasone Yanonsa (LAO)
Val Stephen Jaca (PHI)	0–3 (3–11, 4–11, 4–11)	Cheng Jingqi (CHN)

Round of 16; 5 July
Yin Hang (CHN)	11	9	11	11
Clarence Chew (SIN)	8	11	3	5
Suchat Pitakgulsiri (THA)	7	11	8	6
Jang Woo-jin (KOR)	11	7	11	11
Chiu Chung Hei (HKG)	11	8	4	6
Hung Tzu-hsiang (TPE)	9	11	11	11
Lê Tuấn Anh (VIE)	6	5	7
Koki Niwa (JPN)	11	11	11
Kim Dong-hyun (KOR)	11	11	11
Đoàn Bá Tuấn Anh (VIE)	9	5	6
Tay Jit Kiat (SIN)	8	7	8
Alireza Mollarajabi (IRI)	11	11	11
Lee Chia-sheng (TPE)	11	11	11
Andreý Milowanow (TKM)	4	6	1
Daryl Hung (HKG)	4	2	5
Cheng Jingqi (CHN)	11	11	11

Quarterfinals; 5 July
Yin Hang (CHN)	11	11	11	11
Jang Woo-jin (KOR)	8	8	7	6
Hung Tzu-hsiang (TPE)	1	8	8	11	9
Koki Niwa (JPN)	11	11	11	6	11
Kim Dong-hyun (KOR)	11	12	7	11	11
Alireza Mollarajabi (IRI)	6	10	11	8	4
Lee Chia-sheng (TPE)	5	6	9	9
Cheng Jingqi (CHN)	11	11	11	11

Semifinals; 6 July
Yin Hang (CHN)	11	3	11	11	13
Koki Niwa (JPN)	7	11	9	9	11
Kim Dong-hyun (KOR)	5	2	9	9
Cheng Jingqi (CHN)	11	11	11	11

Final; 6 July
Yin Hang (CHN)	11	11	2	11	13
Cheng Jingqi (CHN)	9	5	11	9	11

=== Girls' singles ===
Round of 64 – 4 July
Huang Hsin (TPE)	3–0 (11–3, 11–5, 20–18)	Nguyễn Hồng Tâm (VIE)
Aminath Shiura Shareef (MDV)	0–3 (6–11, 1–11, 4–11)	Areeya Sangpao (THA)
Enejan Ballyýewa (TKM)	3–2 (6–11, 11–4, 8–11, 11–8, 11–7)	Elonna Dane Tormis (PHI)
Hong Si Teng (MAC)	0–3 (7–11, 7–11, 8–11)	Abeera Ali (PAK)
Kim Song-i (PRK)	3–0 (11–5, 11–3, 11–6)	Ian Lariba (PHI)
Elina Maharjan (NEP)	0–3 (8–11, 3–11, 1–11)	Chin Hsiao-chun (TPE)
Shahdoza Jumabaeva (UZB)	3–0 (11–5, 11–2, 11–5)	Mariyam Leena (MDV)

Round of 32 – 4 July
Chen Meng (CHN)	3–0 (11–3, 11–9, 11–5)	Chau Hai Qing (SIN)
Nuwani Navodya (SRI)	0–3 (8–11, 9–11, 7–11)	Lee Da-som (KOR)
Maha Al-Ammar (KUW)	0–3 (2–11, 1–11, 1–11)	Huang Hsin (TPE)
Rojina Deshar (NEP)	0–3 (3–11, 1–11, 5–11)	Li Ching Wan (HKG)
Mallika Bhandarkar (IND)	3–0 (11–4, 11–6, 11–4)	Saruulsaikhany Chinbat (MGL)
Areeya Sangpao (THA)	3–0 (11–4, 11–7, 12–10)	Fatemeh Hosseinzadeh (IRI)
Olga Kim (UZB)	3–0 (11–6, 11–3, 11–5)	Enejan Ballyýewa (TKM)
Chong Weng I (MAC)	0–3 (5–11, 7–11, 4–11)	Ayuka Tanioka (JPN)
Isabelle Li (SIN)	3–0 (11–5, 11–3, 11–2)	Kavindi Sahabandu (SRI)
Abeera Ali (PAK)	0–3 (6–11, 7–11, 8–11)	Soulmaz Mohammadpour (IRI)
Laksika Thongsub (THA)	1–3 (12–10, 6–11, 6–11, 7–11)	Kim Song-i (PRK)
Nguyễn Thị Việt Linh (VIE)	3–1 (11–8, 9–11, 11–5, 11–6)	Rika Suzuki (JPN)
Ng Ka Yee (HKG)	3–0 (11–1, 11–1, 11–2)	Aisha Al-Emjaidiel (KUW)
Chin Hsiao-chun (TPE)	0–3 (8–11, 9–11, 6–11)	Gu Yuting (CHN)
Charvi Kavle (IND)	3–2 (11–13, 10–12, 11–2, 11–6, 11–4)	Shahdoza Jumabaeva (UZB)
Enerelyn Altanzagas (MGL)	0–3 (3–11, 3–11, 1–11)	Yang Ha-eun (KOR)

Round of 16; 5 July
Chen Meng (CHN)	11	11	11
Lee Da-som (KOR)	9	6	4
Huang Hsin (TPE)	4	11	9	4
Li Ching Wan (HKG)	11	5	11	11
Mallika Bhandarkar (IND)	8	11	6	11	6
Areeya Sangpao (THA)	11	4	11	9	11
Olga Kim (UZB)	3	5	4
Ayuka Tanioka (JPN)	11	11	11
Isabelle Li (SIN)	11	11	11
Soulmaz Mohammadpour (IRI)	4	4	4
Kim Song-i (PRK)	11	11	12
Nguyễn Thị Việt Linh (VIE)	8	9	10
Ng Ka Yee (HKG)	1	5	5
Gu Yuting (CHN)	11	11	11
Charvi Kavle (IND)	3	8	4
Yang Ha-eun (KOR)	11	11	11

Quarterfinals; 6 July
Chen Meng (CHN)	11	9	11	11	11
Li Ching Wan (HKG)	7	11	4	2	3
Areeya Sangpao (THA)	5	8	6	5
Ayuka Tanioka (JPN)	11	11	11	11
Isabelle Li (SIN)	11	7	10	12	3	11	7
Kim Song-i (PRK)	9	11	12	10	11	8	11
Gu Yuting (CHN)	11	11	11	12
Yang Ha-eun (KOR)	6	5	8	10

Semifinals; 6 July
Chen Meng (CHN)	11	11	6	13	5	4	13
Ayuka Tanioka (JPN)	8	5	11	11	11	11	11
Kim Song-i (PRK)	3	2	2	3
Gu Yuting (CHN)	11	11	11	11

Final; 6 July
Chen Meng (CHN)	9	11	11	11	11
Gu Yuting (CHN)	11	8	5	5	8

=== Mixed doubles ===
Round of 64 – 3 July
Kim Jin-su (PRK); Kim Song-i (PRK)	3–1 (11–4, 8–11, 11–7, 11–2)	Shashiranga Arsakulasooriya (SRI); Nuwani Navodya (SRI)

Round of 32 – 3 July
Cheng Jingqi (CHN); Chen Meng (CHN)	3–0 (11–5, 11–6, 11–4)	Đoàn Bá Tuấn Anh (VIE); Nguyễn Hồng Tâm (VIE)
Chao Long Hong (MAC); Chong Weng I (MAC)	0–3 (8–11, 7–11, 7–11)	Hung Tzu-hsiang (TPE); Chin Hsiao-chun (TPE)
Arnab Adhikari (IND); Mallika Bhandarkar (IND)	3–1 (15–13, 11–6, 8–11, 11–7)	Elmurod Holikov (UZB); Olga Kim (UZB)
Val Stephen Jaca (PHI); Ian Lariba (PHI)	0–3 (4–11, 3–11, 18–20)	Daryl Hung (HKG); Li Ching Wan (HKG)
Clarence Chew (SIN); Isabelle Li (SIN)	3–0 (11–5, 11–1, 11–2)	Baasankhüügiin Samdan (MGL); Saruulsaikhany Chinbat (MGL)
Imantha Udanjaya (SRI); Kavindi Sahabandu (SRI)	0–3 (6–11, 3–11, 7–11)	Jang Woo-jin (KOR); Lee Da-som (KOR)
Tanapol Santiwattanatarm (THA); Laksika Thongsub (THA)	3–0 (11–3, 11–4, 11–6)	Tabish Khurshid (PAK); Abeera Ali (PAK)
Meshari Al-Banai (KUW); Maha Al-Ammar (KUW)	0–3 (1–11, 3–11, 5–11)	Asuka Machi (JPN); Rika Suzuki (JPN)
Kim Dong-hyun (KOR); Yang Ha-eun (KOR)	3–0 (11–1, 11–3, 11–3)	Ibrahim Shifan (MDV); Aminath Shiura Shareef (MDV)
Lê Tuấn Anh (VIE); Nguyễn Thị Việt Linh (VIE)	3–1 (9–11, 11–9, 11–5, 12–10)	Tay Jit Kiat (SIN); Chau Hai Qing (SIN)
Lee Chia-sheng (TPE); Huang Hsin (TPE)	1–3 (11–7, 6–11, 8–11, 3–11)	Kim Jin-su (PRK); Kim Song-i (PRK)
Chao Long Chon (MAC); Hong Si Teng (MAC)	0–3 (4–11, 7–11, 7–11)	Avik Das (IND); Charvi Kavle (IND)
Chiu Chung Hei (HKG); Ng Ka Yee (HKG)	3–0 (11–7, 11–2, 11–5)	Mönkh-Orgilyn Batbayar (MGL); Enerelyn Altanzagas (MGL)
Andreý Milowanow (TKM); Enejan Ballyýewa (TKM)	0–3 (9–11, 9–11, 7–11)	Suchat Pitakgulsiri (THA); Areeya Sangpao (THA)
Yin Hang (CHN); Gu Yuting (CHN)	3–0 (11–2, 11–4, 11–2)	Abdullah Al-Makimy (KUW); Aisha Al-Emjaidiel (KUW)
Timur Nagumanov (UZB); Shahdoza Jumabaeva (UZB)	0–3 (1–11, 2–11, 2–11)	Koki Niwa (JPN); Ayuka Tanioka (JPN)

Round of 16; 3 July
Cheng Jingqi (CHN); Chen Meng (CHN)	11	8	11	11
Hung Tzu-hsiang (TPE); Chin Hsiao-chun (TPE)	5	11	7	6
Arnab Adhikari (IND); Mallika Bhandarkar (IND)	11	2	4	11	6
Daryl Hung (HKG); Li Ching Wan (HKG)	7	11	11	8	11
Clarence Chew (SIN); Isabelle Li (SIN)	9	11	11	11
Jang Woo-jin (KOR); Lee Da-som (KOR)	11	9	7	8
Tanapol Santiwattanatarm (THA); Laksika Thongsub (THA)	8	6	6
Asuka Machi (JPN); Rika Suzuki (JPN)	11	11	11
Kim Dong-hyun (KOR); Yang Ha-eun (KOR)	11	11	11
Lê Tuấn Anh (VIE); Nguyễn Thị Việt Linh (VIE)	4	5	4
Kim Jin-su (PRK); Kim Song-i (PRK)	11	11	7	11	11
Avik Das (IND); Charvi Kavle (IND)	13	6	11	9	6
Chiu Chung Hei (HKG); Ng Ka Yee (HKG)	11	11	11
Suchat Pitakgulsiri (THA); Areeya Sangpao (THA)	9	2	4
Yin Hang (CHN); Gu Yuting (CHN)	11	11	11
Koki Niwa (JPN); Ayuka Tanioka (JPN)	4	2	5

Quarterfinals; 4 July
Cheng Jingqi (CHN); Chen Meng (CHN)	11	11	16
Daryl Hung (HKG); Li Ching Wan (HKG)	6	2	14
Clarence Chew (SIN); Isabelle Li (SIN)	7	11	9	6
Asuka Machi (JPN); Rika Suzuki (JPN)	11	4	11	11
Kim Dong-hyun (KOR); Yang Ha-eun (KOR)	11	11	11
Kim Jin-su (PRK); Kim Song-i (PRK)	7	6	6
Chiu Chung Hei (HKG); Ng Ka Yee (HKG)	5	4	4
Yin Hang (CHN); Gu Yuting (CHN)	11	11	11

Semifinals; 5 July
Cheng Jingqi (CHN); Chen Meng (CHN)	11	9	11	13
Asuka Machi (JPN); Rika Suzuki (JPN)	6	11	8	11
Kim Dong-hyun (KOR); Yang Ha-eun (KOR)	6	11	7	12
Yin Hang (CHN); Gu Yuting (CHN)	11	9	11	14

Final; 6 July
Cheng Jingqi (CHN); Chen Meng (CHN)	10	11	7	7
Yin Hang (CHN); Gu Yuting (CHN)	12	6	11	11

=== Mixed team ===
==== 1st stage ====
1–2 July

Group A
Pos	Team	Pld	W	L	Pts	CHN	PRK	VIE	THA	PAK
1	China	4	4	0	8	—	3–0	3–0	3–0	3–0
2	North Korea	4	3	1	7	0–3, 0–3, 0–3	—	3–0	3–0	3–0
3	Vietnam	4	2	2	6	0–3, 0–3, 0–3	0–3, 1–3, 1–3	—	2–1	3–0
4	Thailand	4	1	3	5	0–3, 0–3, 0–3	0–3, 1–3, 1–3	1–3, 3–1, 0–3	—	3–0
5	Pakistan	4	0	4	4	0–3, 0–3, 0–3	0–3, 0–3, 0–3	0–3, 0–3, 0–3	0–3, 0–3, 0–3	—

Group B
Pos	Team	Pld	W	L	Pts	TPE	JPN	SRI	MAC	MDV
1	Chinese Taipei	4	4	0	8	—	2–1	3–0	3–0	3–0
2	Japan	4	3	1	7	2–3, 3–0, 0–3	—	3–0	3–0	3–0
3	Sri Lanka	4	2	2	6	0–3, 0–3, 0–3	0–3, 0–3, 0–3	—	2–1	3–0
4	Macau	4	1	3	5	0–3, 0–3, 0–3	0–3, 0–3, 0–3	1–3, 3–1, 1–3	—	3–0
5	Maldives	4	0	4	4	0–3, 0–3, 0–3	0–3, 0–3, 0–3	0–3, 0–3, 0–3	0–3, 0–3, 0–3	—

Group C
Pos	Team	Pld	W	L	Pts	KOR	IND	UZB	TKM	MGL
1	South Korea	4	4	0	8	—	3–0	3–0	3–0	3–0
2	India	4	3	1	7	0–3, 0–3, 2–3	—	3–0	3–0	3–0
3	Uzbekistan	4	2	2	6	0–3, 0–3, 0–3	0–3, 1–3, 1–3	—	3–0	3–0
4	Turkmenistan	4	1	3	5	0–3, 0–3, 0–3	0–3, 0–3, 0–3	0–3, 1–3, 0–3	—	2–1
5	Mongolia	4	0	4	4	0–3, 0–3, 0–3	0–3, 0–3, 0–3	0–3, 2–3, 1–3	0–3, 3–0, 1–3	—

Group D
Pos	Team	Pld	W	L	Pts	SIN	HKG	PHI	KUW	NEP
1	Singapore	4	4	0	8	—	2–1	3–0	3–0	3–0
2	Hong Kong	4	3	1	7	0–3, 3–1, 2–3	—	3–0	3–0	3–0
3	Philippines	4	2	2	6	0–3, 0–3, 0–3	0–3, 0–3, 0–3	—	2–1	2–1
4	Kuwait	4	1	3	5	0–3, 0–3, 0–3	0–3, 0–3, 0–3	0–3, 3–1, 1–3	—	2–1
5	Nepal	4	0	4	4	0–3, 0–3, 0–3	0–3, 0–3, 0–3	0–3, 3–1, 0–3	2–3, 0–3, 3–0	—

Source: STTA

==== Knockout stage ====
Quarterfinals; 3 July
China	3	3
Japan	2	2
India	1	0
Singapore	3	3
South Korea	2	2
North Korea	3	3
Hong Kong	1	1
Chinese Taipei	3	3

Semifinals; 3 July
China	3	3
Singapore	0	1
North Korea	3	1	3
Chinese Taipei	0	3	1

Final; 4 July
China	3	3
North Korea	1	0
