= Cheng Jingqi =

Chinese table tennis player

Personal information
- Nationality: Chinese

Sport
- Sport: Table tennis
- Highest ranking: 180 (January 2016)
- Current ranking: 180 (January 2016)
Medal record
Men's table tennis
Representing China
World Junior Championships
Bronze medal – third place	2008 Madrid	Mixed Doubles
Gold medal – first place	2008 Madrid	Team
Asian Youth Games
Silver medal – second place	2009 Singapore	Singles
Silver medal – second place	2009 Singapore	Mixed Doubles
Gold medal – first place	2009 Singapore	Mixed Team

Cheng Jingqi is a Chinese table tennis player.

Formerly among the top junior players in the world, Cheng currently represents Bazhou Hairun in the China Table Tennis Super League.

In 2023 Cheng Jingqi appeared in chinese dating reality show Heart Signal season 6 as a regular guest.
