= 2012 World Junior Table Tennis Championships =

Table tennis tournament in India

Tournament details
- Dates: 9 – 16 December 2012
- Edition: 10th
- Venue: Gachibowli Indoor Stadium
- Location: Hyderabad, India

The 2012 World Junior Table Tennis Championships were held in Hyderabad, India, from 9 to 16 December 2012. It was organised by the Table Tennis Federation of India (TTFI) under the auspices and authority of the International Table Tennis Federation (ITTF).

== Medal summary ==
=== Events ===
Event	Gold	Silver	Bronze
Boys' singles	China; Fan Zhendong	China; Lin Gaoyuan	China; Fan Shengpeng
Boys' singles	China; Fan Zhendong	China; Lin Gaoyuan	China; Xu Chenhao
Girls' singles	China; Zhu Yuling	China; Gu Yuting	China; Gu Ruochen
Girls' singles	China; Zhu Yuling	China; Gu Yuting	Germany; Petrissa Solja
Boys' doubles	China; Lin Gaoyuan; Xu Chenhao	China; Fan Zhendong; Fan Shengpeng	Chinese Taipei; Hung Tzu-hsiang; Lee Chia-sheng
Boys' doubles	China; Lin Gaoyuan; Xu Chenhao	China; Fan Zhendong; Fan Shengpeng	Japan; Yuto Muramatsu; Asuka Sakai
Girls' doubles	China; Gu Yuting; Zhu Yuling	China; Liu Gaoyang; Gu Ruochen	Japan; Miyu Maeda; Ayuka Tanioka
Girls' doubles	China; Gu Yuting; Zhu Yuling	China; Liu Gaoyang; Gu Ruochen	Romania; Bernadette Szőcs; Irina Ciobanu
Mixed doubles	China; Fan Zhendong; Liu Gaoyang	China; Lin Gaoyuan; Gu Ruochen	China; Xu Chenhao; Zhu Yuling
Mixed doubles	China; Fan Zhendong; Liu Gaoyang	China; Lin Gaoyuan; Gu Ruochen	Germany; Frederick Jost; Petrissa Solja
Boys' team	China; Fan Zhendong; Xu Chenhao; Lin Gaoyuan; Fan Shengpeng	Japan; Asuka Sakai; Masaki Yoshida; Asuka Machi; Yuto Muramatsu	France; Enzo Angles; Tristan Flore; Simon Gauzy; Antoine Hachard
Boys' team	China; Fan Zhendong; Xu Chenhao; Lin Gaoyuan; Fan Shengpeng	Japan; Asuka Sakai; Masaki Yoshida; Asuka Machi; Yuto Muramatsu	South Korea; Choi Deokhwa; Jang Woojin; Kim Minhyeok; Lim Jonghoon
Girls' team	China; Liu Gaoyang; Gu Yuting; Gu Ruochen; Zhu Yuling	Japan; Miyu Kato; Miyu Maeda; Ayuka Tanioka; Mima Ito	Germany; Petrissa Solja; Theresa Kraft; Nina Mittelham; Anja Schuh
Girls' team	China; Liu Gaoyang; Gu Yuting; Gu Ruochen; Zhu Yuling	Japan; Miyu Kato; Miyu Maeda; Ayuka Tanioka; Mima Ito	Hong Kong; Soo Wai Yam Minnie; Lam Yee Lok; Doo Hoi Kem; Li Ching Wan

=== Medal table ===
Rank	Nation	Gold	Silver	Bronze	Total
1	China	7	5	4	16
2	Japan	0	2	2	4
3	Germany	0	0	3	3
4	Chinese Taipei	0	0	1	1
4	France	0	0	1	1
4	Hong Kong	0	0	1	1
4	Romania	0	0	1	1
4	South Korea	0	0	1	1
Totals (8 entries)		7	7	14	28

== See also ==
- 2012 World Team Table Tennis Championships
