= Lin Gaoyuan =

Chinese table tennis player (born 1995)

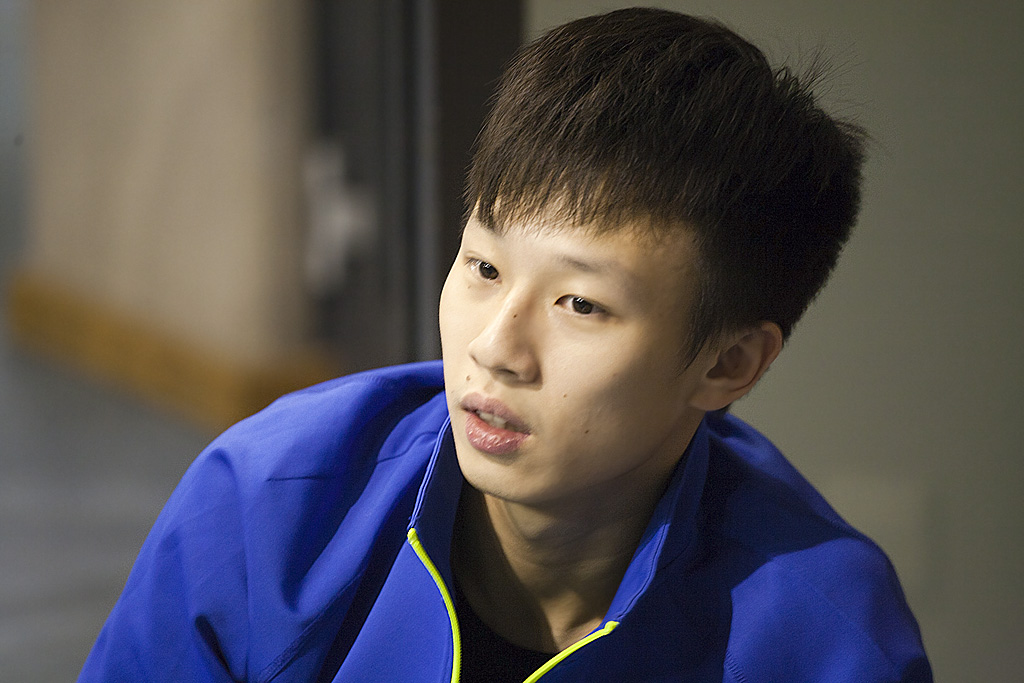
- Lin Gaoyuan at the 2017 German Open

Personal information
- Born: 19 March 1995 (age 31) Shenzhen, China
- Height: 1.75 m (5 ft 9 in)

Sport
- Sport: Table tennis
- Playing style: Left-handed, shakehand grip
- Equipment: Yuanjian Moye Sword, DHS H3 National Blue (FH, Black), DIGNICS 05 (BH, Red)
- Highest ranking: 2 (May 2019)
- Current ranking: 224 (28 September 2026)
Medal record
Event	1st	2nd	3rd
World Championships	3	0	3
World Cup	4	1	1
Total	7	1	4
Men's table tennis
Representing China
World Championships
Gold medal – first place	2018 Halmstad	Team
Gold medal – first place	2022 Chengdu	Team
Gold medal – first place	2024 Busan	Team
Bronze medal – third place	2019 Budapest	Doubles
Bronze medal – third place	2021 Houston	Mixed doubles
Bronze medal – third place	2021 Houston	Doubles
World Cup
Gold medal – first place	2018 London	Team
Gold medal – first place	2019 Tokyo	Team
Gold medal – first place	2023 Chengdu	Mixed team
Gold medal – first place	2024 Chengdu	Mixed team
Silver medal – second place	2024 Macao	Singles
Bronze medal – third place	2018 Paris	Singles
ITTF World Tour Grand Finals
Silver medal – second place	2018 Incheon	Singles
Bronze medal – third place	2017 Astana	Singles
Bronze medal – third place	2019 Zhengzhou	Singles
Asian Games
Gold medal – first place	2018 Jakarta	Team
Gold medal – first place	2022 Hangzhou	Team
Silver medal – second place	2018 Jakarta	Singles
Silver medal – second place	2018 Jakarta	Mixed doubles
Silver medal – second place	2022 Hangzhou	Mixed doubles
Asian Championships
Gold medal – first place	2017 Wuxi	Doubles
Gold medal – first place	2019 Yogyakarta	Team
Gold medal – first place	2019 Yogyakarta	Doubles
Gold medal – first place	2023 Pyeongchang	Doubles
Gold medal – first place	2023 Pyeongchang	Mixed doubles
Gold medal – first place	2023 Pyeongchang	Team
Gold medal – first place	2024 Astana	Team
Silver medal – second place	2019 Yogyakarta	Singles
Asian Cup
Gold medal – first place	2017 Ahmedabad	Singles
Silver medal – second place	2018 Yokohama	Singles
World Junior Championships
Gold medal – first place	2009 Cartagena	Team
Gold medal – first place	2010 Bratislava	Team
Gold medal – first place	2011 Manama	Team
Gold medal – first place	2012 Hyderabad	Doubles
Gold medal – first place	2012 Hyderabad	Team
Silver medal – second place	2009 Cartagena	Doubles
Silver medal – second place	2010 Bratislava	Singles
Silver medal – second place	2010 Bratislava	Mixed doubles
Silver medal – second place	2011 Manama	Singles
Silver medal – second place	2012 Hyderabad	Singles
Silver medal – second place	2012 Hyderabad	Mixed doubles
Bronze medal – third place	2009 Cartagena	Singles
Bronze medal – third place	2009 Cartagena	Mixed doubles
Bronze medal – third place	2010 Bratislava	Doubles
Bronze medal – third place	2011 Manama	Doubles
Bronze medal – third place	2011 Manama	Mixed doubles
Asian Junior Championships
Gold medal – first place	2010 Bangkok	Team
Gold medal – first place	2011 New Delhi	Team
Bronze medal – third place	2010 Bangkok	Singles
Bronze medal – third place	2010 Bangkok	Doubles
Bronze medal – third place	2011 New Delhi	Singles
Representing China / Guangdong
National Games of China
Gold medal – first place	2025 Guangdong, HK, Macao	Mixed doubles
Gold medal – first place	2021 Shaanxi	Team
Bronze medal – third place	2025 Guangdong, HK, Macao	Team
Bronze medal – third place	2017 Tianjin	Doubles
All China Table Tennis Championships
Gold medal – first place	2010 Zhangjiagang	Team
Gold medal – first place	2016 Anshan	Mixed doubles
Gold medal – first place	2019 Tianjin	Mixed doubles
Gold medal – first place	2022 Huangshi	Mixed doubles
Gold medal – first place	2022 Huangshi	Doubles
Gold medal – first place	2020 Weihai	Team
Silver medal – second place	2018 Anshan	Team
Silver medal – second place	2022 Huangshi	Team
Silver medal – second place	2018 Anshan	Mixed doubles
Silver medal – second place	2020 Weihai	Doubles
Silver medal – second place	2022 Huangshi	Singles
Bronze medal – third place	2014 Huangshi	Doubles
Bronze medal – third place	2015 Harbin	Team
Bronze medal – third place	2015 Harbin	Mixed doubles

Lin Gaoyuan (Chinese: 林高远; pinyin: Lín Gāoyuǎn; born 19 March 1995) is a Chinese table tennis player. He was the Asian Cup champion in 2017, and was a member of the Chinese teams that took the gold medals at the World Team Championships in 2018 and 2022.

== Career ==
=== 2011 ===
On 3 July 2011, in the 2011 ITTF Tour Korea Open men's singles semi-finals, Lin Gaoyuan lost 2-4 to South Korea's Lee Sang-soo and won the men's singles third place. On 10 July, in the men's doubles final of the 2011 ITTF Japan Open, Lin Gaoyuan/Wu Jiaji defeated the Japanese pair Matsudaira Kenta/Niwa Takuma 4-1 to win the championship. On 23 July, Lin Gaoyuan played for the Chinese team in the men's team final of the 2011 Asian Youth Table Tennis Championships, helping the Chinese team defeat the Japanese team with a total score of 3-0 and win the championship. On 20 October, Lin Gaoyuan played for the Guangzhou team in the men's table tennis final of the 7th City Games of the People's Republic of China. In the end, the Guangzhou team lost to the Baoding team 1-3 and won the runner-up. On 23 October, Lin Gaoyuan won the bronze medal in the men's singles table tennis competition at the 7th Urban Games of the People's Republic of China. On 14 November, in the men's team competition of the 2011 World Youth Table Tennis Championships, Lin Gaoyuan defeated Yoshimura Masaharu 3-1 in the first set, and defeated Niwa Takuma 3-1 in the fourth set. In the end, the Chinese team defeated the Japanese team 3-1 to win the men's team championship. On 21 November, in the men's singles final of the 2011 World Youth Table Tennis Championships, Lin Gaoyuan lost 2-4 to Takahiro Niwa and won the men's singles runner-up.

=== 2018 ===
On 26 February 2018, Lin Gaoyuan won the men's championship in the 2018 Table Tennis World Cup Team Tournament with the Chinese team.

=== 2020 ===
On 29 January 2020, in the 2020 German Table Tennis Open mixed doubles 1/8 finals, Lin Gaoyuan/Sun Yingsha lost 1-3 to Mizutani Jun/Ito Mima. On 1 February, in the men's singles semi-finals of the 2020 German Table Tennis Open, Lin Gaoyuan lost to Xu Xin 0-4. On 2 February, in the men's doubles final of the 2020 German Table Tennis Open, Lin Gaoyuan/Ma Long lost 2-3 to the Korean combination Zhao Dacheng/Zhang Yuzhen and won the runner-up. On 6 March, in the first round of the men's singles match of the 2020 ITTF World Tour Qatar Open, Lin Gaoyuan lost 3-4 to Belarusian player Samsonov. On 21 August, in the men's team final of the National Table Tennis Team Tokyo Olympic Simulation Tournament, the second team consisting of Liang Jingkun, Wang Chuqin and Lin Gaoyuan lost 0-3 to the men's team consisting of Ma Long, Xu Xin and Fan Zhendong and won the men's team runner-up. On 4 October, in the men's team final of the 2020 National Table Tennis Championships, the Guangdong team composed of Lin Gaoyuan, Zhou Qihao and Zhang Chao defeated the Beijing team 3-2 and won the championship.

=== 2021 ===
In May, Lin played the China Olympic Scrimmages, but he lost to Fang Bo in the group stage of the first leg. Lin lost 4–1 to Fan Zhendong in the quarter-finals of the second leg of the Chinese Olympic Scrimmage.

=== 2023 ===
On 21 February 2023, in the mixed doubles final of the first qualifying tournament for the Durban World Table Tennis Championships, Lin Gaoyuan/Chen Xingtong defeated Yu Ziyang/Sun Mingyang 3-1 to win the championship.

=== 2026 ===
On 5 October 2026, Lin's 90 ITTF ranking points expired. They were all from the 2025 China Smash, the only tournament he played, which expired on the exact day of this ranking update due to the one-year-limit.

== Finals ==
=== Men's singles ===
Result	Year	Tournament	Opponent	Score	Ref
Winner	2017	Asian Cup	(China) Fan Zhendong	4–2	
Winner	2017	ITTF World Tour, Austrian Open	(China) Yan An	4–1	
Runner-up	2018	Asian Cup	(China) Fan Zhendong	0–4	
Runner-up	2018	Asian Games	(China) Fan Zhendong	2–4	
Runner-up	2018	ITTF World Tour Grand Finals	(Japan) Tomokazu Harimoto	1–4	
Winner	2019	ITTF World Tour, Hungarian Open	(China) Wang Chuqin	4–0	
Runner-up	2019	ITTF Challenge Plus, Portugal Open	(China) Liang Jingkun	1–4	
Runner-up	2019	ITTF World Tour Platinum, Qatar Open	(China) Ma Long	2–4	
Runner-up	2019	ITTF World Tour Platinum, China Open	(China) Ma Long	0–4	
Winner	2019	ITTF World Tour, Hong Kong Open	(Japan) Tomokazu Harimoto	4–2	
Runner-up	2019	Asian Championships	(China) Xu Xin	1–3	
Runner-up	2019	ITTF World Tour, Swedish Open	(China) Wang Chuqin	0–4	
Runner-up	2022	WTT Contender Muscat	(China) Liang Jingkun	1–4	
Runner-up	2022	WTT Champions European Summer Series	(Japan) Tomokazu Harimoto	3–4	
Winner	2023	WTT Star Contender Bangkok	(South Korea) Jang Woo-jin	4–3	
Winner	2023	WTT Contender Zagreb	(China) Fan Zhendong	4–3	
Runner-up	2024	World Cup	(China) Ma Long	3–4	
Runner-up	2024	WTT Star Contender Bangkok	(Japan) Tomokazu Harimoto	0–4	

=== Men's doubles ===
Result	Year	Tournament	Partner	Opponents	Score	Ref
Winner	2011	ITTF Pro Tour, Japan Open	Wu Jiaji	(Japan) Kenta Matsudaira / Koki Niwa	4–1	
Winner	2014	ITTF World Tour, Kuwait Open	Stefan Fegerl	(Chinese Taipei) Chiang Hung-chieh / Huang Sheng-sheng	3–2	
Winner	2017	Asian Championships	Fan Zhendong	(China) Fang Bo / Zhou Yu	3–1	
Winner	2018	ITTF World Tour, China Open	Fan Zhendong	(Romania) Ovidiu Ionescu / (Spain) Álvaro Robles	3–0	
Runner-up	2019	ITTF World Tour, Hungarian Open	Fan Zhendong	(China) Liang Jingkun / Xu Xin	2–3	
Winner	2019	ITTF World Tour, Hong Kong Open	Liang Jingkun	(South Korea) Jang Woo-jin / Lim Jong-hoon	3–1	
Runner-up	2019	ITTF World Tour Platinum, Australian Open	Ma Long	(South Korea) Jeoung Young-sik / Lee Sang-su	0–3	
Winner	2019	Asian Championships	Liang Jingkun	(China) Fan Zhendong / Xu Xin	3–1	
Runner-up	2019	ITTF World Tour, Swedish Open	Liang Jingkun	(China) Fan Zhendong / Xu Xin	2–3	
Winner	2019	ITTF World Tour Platinum, Austrian Open	Liang Jingkun	(South Korea) Jeoung Young-sik / Lee Sang-su	3–0	
Runner-up	2020	ITTF World Tour Platinum, German Open	Ma Long	(South Korea) Cho Dae-seong / Jang Woo-jin	2–3	
Winner	2021	WTT Contender Laško	Zhou Qihao	(Japan) Yuta Tanaka / Yuto Kizukuri	3–0	
Winner	2021	WTT Contender Novo Mesto	Zhou Qihao	(China) Liang Jingkun / Wang Chuqin	3–1	
Runner-up	2022	WTT Star Contender European Summer Series	Liang Jingkun	(South Korea) Cho Dae-seong / Lee Sang-su	2–3	
Winner	2023	WTT Star Contender Bangkok	Lin Shidong	(South Korea) Lim Jong-hoon / Jang Woo-jin	3–0	
Runner-up	2023	WTT Contender Zagreb	Liang Jingkun	(China) Yuan Licen / Lin Shidong	1–3	
Winner	2023	Asian Championships	Fan Zhendong	(China) Ma Long / Wang Chuqin	3–2	
Winner	2023	WTT Contender Taiyuan	Lin Shidong	(China) Liang Jingkun / Wang Chuqin	3–2	
Runner-up	2024	WTT Finals	Lin Shidong	(China) Xiang Peng / Yuan Licen	0–3	
Winner	2024	Singapore Smash	Ma Long	(China) Fan Zhendong / Wang Chuqin	3–2	
Winner	2024	WTT Contender Taiyuan	Ma Long	(China) Liang Jingkun / Wang Chuqin	3–1	
Runner-up	2024	China Smash	Lin Shidong	(China) Liang Jingkun / Wang Chuqin	2–3	

=== Mixed doubles ===
Result	Year	Tournament	Partner	Opponents	Score	Ref
Winner	2018	ITTF World Tour, China Open	Chen Xingtong	(Japan) Masataka Morizono / Mima Ito	3–1	
Runner-up	2018	Asian Games	Wang Manyu	(China) Wang Chuqin / Sun Yingsha	2–4	
Winner	2019	ITTF Challenge Plus, Portugal Open	Liu Shiwen	(Slovakia) Ľubomír Pištej / Tatiana Kukulkova	3–0	
Runner-up	2019	ITTF World Tour Platinum, Austrian Open	Zhu Yuling	(Japan) Tomokazu Harimoto / Hina Hayata	1–3	
Winner	2023	WTT Star Contender Bangkok	Chen Xingtong	(South Korea) Lim Jong-hoon / Shin Yu-bin	3–2	
Winner	2023	Asian Championships	Wang Yidi	(China) Liang Jingkun / Qian Tianyi	3–1	
Runner-up	2023	Asian Games	Wang Yidi	(China) Wang Chuqin / Sun Yingsha	1–4	
Runner-up	2024	WTT Contender Doha	Wang Manyu	(China) Wang Chuqin / Sun Yingsha	2–3	
Runner-up	2024	WTT Contender Taiyuan	Wang Yidi	(China) Lin Shidong / Kuai Man	1–3	
Runner-up	2024	China Smash	Wang Yidi	(China) Lin Shidong / Kuai Man	1–3	
Winner	2025	National Games of China	Liu Shiwen	(China) Chen Yuanyu / Kuai Man	4–2	
