= Ng Wing Nam =

Hong Kong table tennis player

Venus Ng Wing Nam
Personal information
- Nationality: Hong Konger
- Born: 9 August 1992 (age 34)
Medal record
Women's table tennis
Representing Hong Kong
World Championships
| Bronze medal – third place | 2012 Dortmund | Team |
| Bronze medal – third place | 2014 Tokyo | Team |
| Bronze medal – third place | 2018 Halmstad | Team |
World Cup
| Bronze medal – third place | 2011 Magdeburg | Team |
| Bronze medal – third place | 2013 Guangzhou | Team |
| Bronze medal – third place | 2018 London | Team |
Asian Games
| Bronze medal – third place | 2014 Incheon | Doubles |
| Bronze medal – third place | 2018 Jakata | Team |
Asian Championships
| Bronze medal – third place | 2011 Macau | Doubles |
| Bronze medal – third place | 2017 Wuxi | Team |
| Bronze medal – third place | 2021 Doha | Team |
East Asian Games
| Bronze medal – third place | 2013 Tianjin | Team |
World Junior Championships
| Bronze medal – third place | 2010 Bratislava | Mixed Doubles |
| Bronze medal – third place | 2009 Cartagena | Doubles |

Venus Ng Wing Nam (Chinese: 吳穎嵐; born 9 August 1992) is a Hong Kong table tennis player. Since 2007, she became a full time athlete in Hong Kong Sports Institute. Her highest career ITTF ranking was 28 in July 2014. She was the first local player to win medals at the Asian Table Tennis Championships and the ITTF World Tour Grand Finals.

== Early years ==
Ng studied at Heep Yunn School in her early years. She chose to become a full-time athlete and entered the Hong Kong Institute of Sports for training. She dropped out at 15 years old to pursue a full-time athletic career. The coaches are the former Chinese table tennis team and the Hong Kong table tennis team. Since 2013, Ng's main coach changed from Li Huifen to Li Ching, who is 2004 Athens Olympic men's doubles silver medal.

=== 2012 ===
In 2012, as a local player, Ng won the bronze medal for Hong Kong in the women's doubles at the Asian Table Tennis Championships. In the same year, she also participated in the women's team competition at the World Table Tennis Championships as a member of the Hong Kong team and won a bronze medal.

=== 2013 ===
In 2013, Ng won the U21 women's singles runner-up in the ITTF World Tour Grand Finals.

=== 2014 ===
In 2014, at the International Table Tennis Federation (ITTF) Platinum World Tour Qatar Open, she achieved a bronze medal in singles and a gold medal in doubles. In singles, she achieved victories over Singapore's top player and Three-Time Olympic medalist Feng Tianwei, Japan's player and silver medalist at the 2012 London Olympic Hirano Sayaka, and China's national team player 2014 Summer Youth Olympic Games Liu Gaoyang. In doubles, she and her partner defeated the China team of Liu Gaoyang and Liu Xi to claim the championship.

Later in May of the same year, she secured a bronze medal in the women's team event at the World Table Tennis Championships held in Tokyo, achieving the best result of only losing one match. Once again, she drew attention at the Asian Games held in Incheon, South Korea, where she, alongside Lee Ho Ching, brought home a bronze medal for Hong Kong, becoming the third generation of 'twin stars' in Hong Kong table tennis history, following in the footsteps of Chan Tan Lui/Qi Bao Hua and Li Ching/Ko Lai Chak.

=== 2015 ===
In 2015, she took a temporary leave from the sports scene, only to make a return two years later, rejoining the Hong Kong representative team to continue her journey of competing on behalf of her homeland.

=== 2017 ===
After rejoining the team in 2017, Ng achieved successful results in both singles and doubles events at the International Table Tennis Federation World Tour Platinum event in India, securing bronze medals in each category. Following the singles event, she further earned a bronze medal with her team at the Asian Table Tennis Championships.

=== 2018 ===
In 2018, amidst the Table Tennis World Cup in London, UK, she clinched a bronze medal. Throughout the year, she succeeded in the doubles competitions at the International Table Tennis Federation World Tour events in Slovenia and Serbia. Adding to her accolades, she played a role in securing a bronze medal for her team at the World Table Tennis Championships in Halmstad, Sweden. Furthermore, 2018 Asian Games in Jakarta, Indonesia, held once every four years, she secured another team bronze medal, thus solidifying her position as a two-time consecutive Asian Games medalist.

=== 2021 ===
In 2021, she made her comeback from the pandemic at the Qatar Asian Table Tennis Championships, where she reached the semi-finals but fell short against Japan, ultimately securing a bronze medal.

== Honours ==
- Hong Kong Sports Stars Awards

- Hong Kong Potential Sports Stars Awards
