= Yin Hang (table tennis) =

Chinese table tennis player

Personal information
- Nationality: Chinese

Sport
- Sport: Table tennis
Medal record
Men's table tennis
Representing China
Asian Youth Games
Gold medal – first place	2009 Singapore	Singles
Gold medal – first place	2009 Singapore	Mixed Doubles
Gold medal – first place	2009 Singapore	Mixed Team
ITTF World Cadet Challenge
Gold medal – first place	2009 Tokyo	Singles
Silver medal – second place	2009 Tokyo	Doubles
Silver medal – second place	2009 Tokyo	Team
Asian Cadet Championships
Gold medal – first place	2009 Jaipur	Singles
Gold medal – first place	2009 Jaipur	Team

Yin Hang is a Chinese table tennis player.

Formerly among the top junior players in the world, Yin currently represents Guangdong Chenjing in the China Table Tennis Super League.
