= Koki Niwa =

Japanese table tennis player (born 1994)

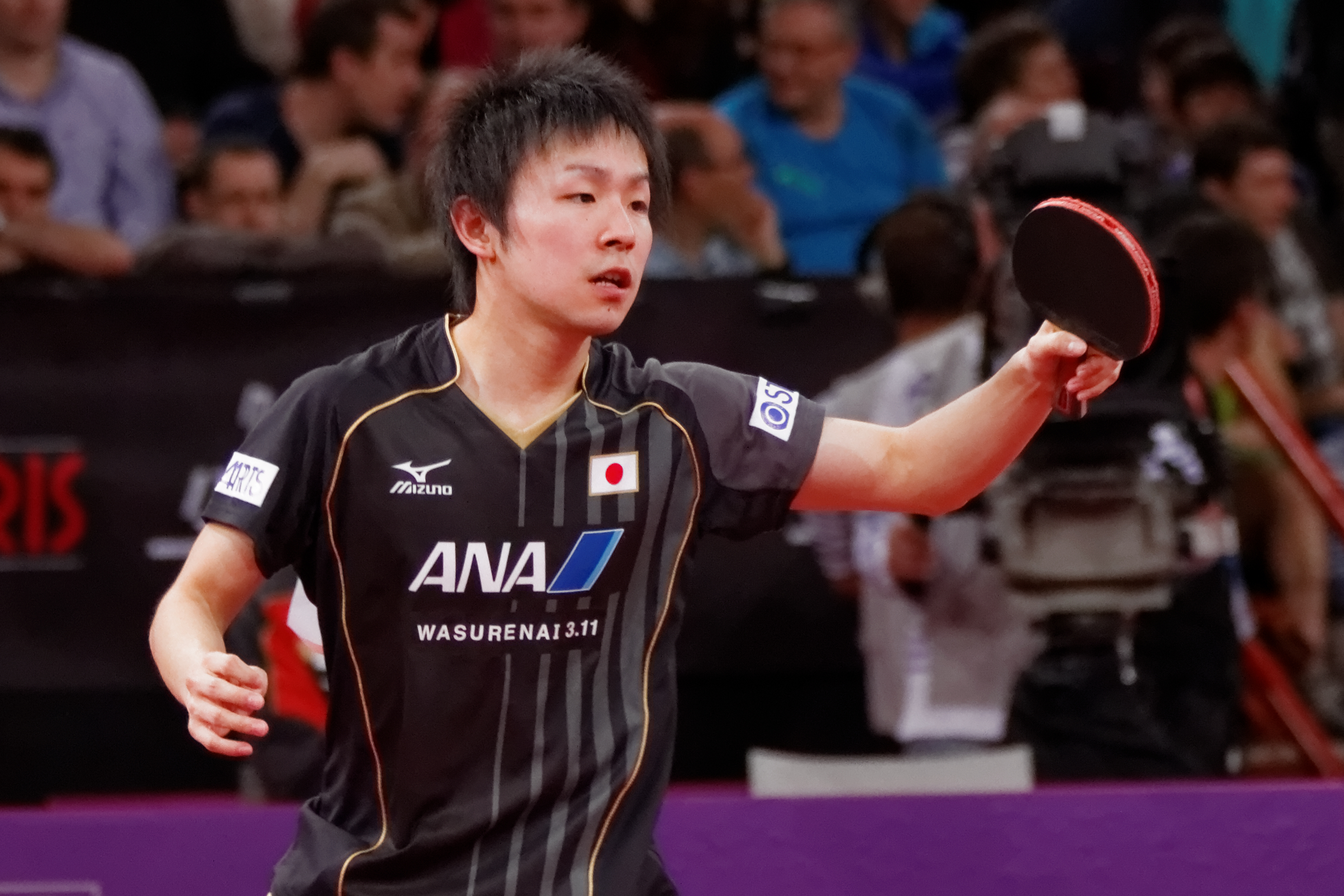
- Niwa at the 2013 World Championships

Personal information
- Born: 10 October 1994 (age 31) Tomakomai, Hokkaido, Japan
- Height: 1.62 m (5 ft 4 in)
- Weight: 51 kg (112 lb)

Sport
- Sport: Table tennis
- Club: Kinoshita Meister Tokyo
- Playing style: Left-handed, shakehand grip
- Equipment: BH: Victas V > 22 double Extra, FH: Victas V > 22 double Extra, Blade: Victas Koki Niwa Wood
- Highest ranking: 5 (Nov. 2017)
Medal record
Men's Table Tennis
Representing Japan
Event	1st	2nd	3rd
Olympic Games	0	1	1
World Championships	0	1	5
World Cup	0	0	0
Total	0	2	6
Olympic Games
Silver medal – second place	2016 Rio de Janeiro	Team
Bronze medal – third place	2020 Tokyo	Team
World Championships
Silver medal – second place	2016 Kuala Lumpur	Team
Bronze medal – third place	2012 Dortmund	Team
Bronze medal – third place	2014 Tokyo	Team
Bronze medal – third place	2015 Suzhou	Doubles
Bronze medal – third place	2017 Düsseldorf	Doubles
World Cup
Silver medal – second place	2018 London	Team
Youth Olympic Games
Gold medal – first place	2010 Singapore	Singles
Gold medal – first place	2010 Singapore	Mixed Team
Asian Youth Games
Bronze medal – third place	2009 Singapore	Singles
Asian Games
Bronze medal – third place	2010 Guangzhou	Doubles
Bronze medal – third place	2010 Guangzhou	Team
Bronze medal – third place	2014 Incheon	Doubles
Bronze medal – third place	2014 Incheon	Team
Asian Championships
Silver medal – second place	2009 Lucknow	Team
Silver medal – second place	2012 Macau	Team
Silver medal – second place	2013 Busan	Mixed Doubles
Silver medal – second place	2013 Busan	Team
Bronze medal – third place	2009 Lucknow	Doubles
Bronze medal – third place	2013 Busan	Doubles
Bronze medal – third place	2017 Wuxi	Singles
Bronze medal – third place	2017 Wuxi	Doubles

Koki Niwa (丹羽 孝希, Niwa Kōki; born 10 October 1994) is a Japanese male table tennis player. He is the gold medalist at the 2010 Youth Olympics and he won the World Junior Table Tennis Championships in 2010 (doubles) and 2011 (singles).

On 21 April 2012, he defeated Ma Long of China, World Rank no 1, which he became the first player qualified for 2012 Olympics from the Asian Olympic Qualifiers.

Since 2012, he has been playing for the German Team TTC matec Frickenhausen.

He also won the 2014 Russian Open singles title.

== Career ==
=== Junior career ===
Niwa had a prolific junior career that began on 2008. He reached the quarter-finals at the 2008 India Junior Open in Pune, India, and won the doubles title with his partner, Yuki Hirano. At the 2008 World Junior Championships in Madrid, Spain, he partnered with Kenta Matsudaira to reach the semi-finals. On the following year, Niwa partnered with Asuka Machi to win the 2009 ITTF Cadet Challenge and ITTF Junior Circuit Finals in Tokyo, Japan.

At the 2009 World Junior Table Tennis Championships, Niwa reached the quarterfinals in the men's singles event before he was defeated by Lin Gaoyuan. Niwa qualified for the 2009 World Table Tennis Championships in Yokohama, Japan by defeating Josef Simoncik in the qualification tournament. Niwa reached 64 round before he lost over Germany's Dimitrij Ovtcharov.

At the 2010 Singapore Youth Olympics, he won a gold medal in the Boys' Singles Event, and a gold medal partnering Ayuka Tanioka in the Mixed Team event. Niwa won the U21 title at the 2011 Dortmund Pro Tour German Open by defeating Kim Min-seok. At the 2011 Incheon Pro Tour Korea Open, he defeated Jeoung Young-sik where he obtained his second U21 title that year. At the 2011 Manama World Junior Table Tennis Championships, he won the gold medal in the men's singles event, defeating Lin Gaoyuan of China.

=== 2012: Breakthrough ===
By 2012, the 17-year-old world junior champion was gaining widespread attention. His breakthrough came at the 2012 Asian Olympic Qualification Tournament where he overcame world ranked No. 1 Ma Long and became the inaugural Asian player in the sport to qualify for the Olympics. Partnering with Kenta Matsudaira, Niwa overcame the Chinese pair of Wang Hao and Zhou Yu to win the 2012 World Tour Polish Open doubles title.

=== 2013 ===
Niwa qualified for the 2013 World Table Tennis Championships seeded 15. He reached the fourth round in men's singles event before being defeated by Ma Long. He partnered Kenta Matsudaira in the doubles event and reached the third round before losing to compatriots, Jun Mizutani and Seiya Kishikawa. At the 2013 World Tour Japan Open in Yokohama, the "Niwa-Matsudaira" tandem lost in the finals against compatriots, Jin Ueda and Maharu Yoshimura.

=== 2014: First ITTF World Tour Title ===
At the 2014 World Team Table Tennis Championships in Tokyo, Niwa won 4 out of his 5 matches, contributing to Team Japan's bronze medal. At the 2014 World Tour Grand Finals in Bangkok, the Niwa/Matsudaira pair lost in the final to Korean pair Cho Eonrae and Seo Hyundeok. Niwa won the 2014 World Tour Russian Open title in the men's singles event, defeating England's Paul Drinkhall in the final. The Niwa/Matsudaira pair competed in the semi-finals and were defeated by the Russian pair Fedor Kuzmin and Grigory Vlasov.

=== 2015 ===
At the 2015 World Table Tennis Championships, Niwa reached the 4th round before being defeated by China's Fan Zhendong. In the doubles event, the Niwa/Matsudaira pair reached the semi-finals, and were defeated by Fan Zhendong and Zhou Yu. This was the last international partnership with Kenta Matsudaira.

=== 2016 ===
At the 2016 World Team Table Tennis Championships in Kuala Lumpur, Niwa contributed to Team Japan's success in winning the silver medal. The team lost to Team China in the final. Niwa represented Japan at the 2016 Summer Olympics in the men's singles event. He reached the quarterfinals before being defeated by eventual silver medalist Zhang Jike. In the Men's team event, Niwa contributed to team Japan's first silver medal in the category. However, Niwa expressed discontentment with his performance, not winning any singles matches.

=== 2017 ===
Niwa began the year by winning a bronze medal at the 2017 ITTF Asian Championships in Wuxi, China. In the quarterfinals, he defeated world ranked #3 Xu Xin, but lost to Korea's Jeong Sangeun in the semi-finals. At the 2017 World Table Tennis Championships, Niwa partnered with Maharu Yoshimura to win the bronze medal. The Niwa/Yoshimura pair reached the semi-finals where they lost to Chinese pairing and eventual champions Fan Zhendong and Xu Xin in the men's singles event, he reached the quarter-finals, defeating Dimitrij Ovtcharov in the fourth round, and losing to Fan Zhendong in the quarterfinals. At the 2017 World Tour Japan Open, the Niwa/Yoshimura pair reached the finals of the men's doubles event where they lost to the Chinese pairing of Ma Long and Xu Xin.

=== 2021 ===
In March, Niwa played in the WTT Star Contender event at WTT Doha, but he had an early round of 32 exit to Gustavo Tsuboi.

Niwa played in the singles and team event of the 2020 Summer Olympics. Niwa beat Wang Yang in the round of 32 but lost to Dimitrij Ovtcharov in the round of 16 in the men's singles event at the Tokyo Olympics. In the team event, Japan beat Australia in the round of 16. In the quarterfinals, Niwa upset Mattias Falck to lead to Japan's victory over Sweden. In the semifinals, Japan lost to Germany but won the bronze medal after beating South Korea.

=== Retirement ===
Niwa retired from international competition in November 2022 stating that he wanted to "pass the baton on to the next generation and support them" but will continue to actively compete within Japan.

== Major League Table Tennis (MLTT) ==
Following his retirement from international play, Niwa joined Major League Table Tennis (MLTT) in the United States for the 2024–2025 season. He was selected as the No. 2 overall pick in the draft by the New York Slice.

== Doubles Partners ==
=== Niwa / Matsudaira ===
Niwa and Kenta Matsudaira were doubles partners from 2008 to 2015. Their playstyle is characterized by both players' unorthodox playstyles, with Niwa frequently incorporating "chiquita" banana flicks and Matsudaira frequently using his tomahawk service. Both players frequently use their backhand to win points.

The pair first competed in the international scene at the 2008 Cetniewo Polish Youth Open. In 2012, they defeated the Chinese pairing of Wang/Zhou to secure their first men's doubles titles in the ITTF world tour scene. The pair won a bronze medal at the 2015 World Table Tennis Championships. Niwa and Matsudaira have not partnered on the international scene since 2015.

=== Niwa / Yoshimura ===
Niwa and Maharu Yoshimura have been frequent doubles partners starting in 2016. The pairing first rose to prominence at the 2016 Summer Olympics Men's Team Event where the pair contributed to Japan's silver medal. At the 2017 Asian Championships in Wuxi, the pair reached the semifinals before losing to Fan Zhendong/Lin Gaoyuan. At the 2017 World Table Tennis Championships Men's Doubles event, the pair won a joint bronze medal. The following month, at the 2017 World Tour Japan Open, Niwa/Yoshimura reached the finals before losing to Ma Long/Xu Xin in three straight games.

=== Niwa / Mizutani ===
Koki Niwa and Jun Mizutani were expected to play doubles in the team event (alongside Tomokazu Harimoto as the ace player) at the Tokyo Olympics in 2021. Mizutani noted the uniqueness of having a doubles pair with two left-handed players and stated that their objective was to make the match as un-normal as possible.

== Rivalries ==
=== Niwa vs. Chen Chien-an ===
Niwa and Chen have met 9 times in the international scene, with Niwa leading 5–4. Their first encounter was at the 2009 Harmony China Open where Niwa won 4 games to 1. They met another two times at the 2011 Harmony China Open where Chen defeated Niwa in the U21 Men's singles final, and Niwa defeated Chen in the Men's singles main bracket. In their most recent encounter, Chen won 4 games to 2 over Niwa at the 2017 Asian Cup main tournament bracket, and Niwa won 3 games to 0 in the group stage.

=== Niwa vs. Kim Min-seok ===
Niwa and Kim have met 10 times with Niwa leading 6–4. Their first encounter was at the 2009 Korea Open U21 Men's singles event where Niwa won in full games. Niwa and Kim have met 3 times in the semi-final stages of U21 pro tour events. At the 2011 Pro Tour Germany Open U21 Men's singles final, Niwa won in full games over Kim. Their most recent encounter was in 2015 where Niwa won 4 games to 1 at the 2015 World Tour China Open.

== Career statistics ==
=== ITTF Major tournament performance timeline ===
Key
W	F	SF	QF	#R	RR

(W) Won; (F) finalist; (SF) semifinalist; (QF) quarterfinalist; (#R) rounds 4, 3, 2, 1; (RR) round-robin stage; (S) Singles Tournament; (D) Doubles Tournament; (MD) Mixed Doubles Tournament; (T) Team Tournament.

Tournament		2009	2010	2011	2012	2013	2014	2015	2016	2017	2018
World Cup	S							QF		QF	QF
World Cup	T			SF		SF					F
World Championships	S	2R		2R		4R		4R		QF	
World Championships	T				SF		SF		F		QF
World Championships	D	1R		3R		3R		SF		SF	
World Championships	MD	1R						4R			
World Tour Grand Finals	S				1R	1R	QF	1R	1R	1R	1R
World Tour Grand Finals	D		QF		F		F				
Olympic Games	S								QF		
Olympic Games	T				QF				F		

=== ITTF Career Singles Finals: 1 ===
Result	Date	Tournament	Tier	Opponent	Score
Win	November, 2014	Airports of Regions Russian Open; Russia	World Tour	(England) Paul Drinkhall	12-14, 11–8, 11–5, 11–7, 11–7

=== ITTF Career Doubles Finals: 10 ===
Result	Date	Tournament	Tier	Partner	Opponents	Score
Win	July, 2010	Japan Open; Japan	Pro Tour	(Japan) Kenta Matsudaira	(Hong Kong) Jiang Tianyi (Hong Kong) Leung Chu Yan	6-11, 11–5, 7–11, 13–11, 11–4, 14–16, 11–1
Win	October, 2010	JOOLA Hungarian Open; Hungary	Pro Tour	(Japan) Kenta Matsudaira	(Japan) Jun Mizutani (Japan) Kaii Yoshida	11-8, 11–8, 11–6, 8–11, 8–11, 11–8
Runner-up	July, 2011	Japan Open; Japan	Pro Tour	(Japan) Kenta Matsudaira	(China) Lin Gaoyuan (China) Wu Jiaji	6-11, 9–11, 11–9, 7–11, 9–11
Win	November, 2012	Polish Open; Poznan, Poland	World Tour	(Japan) Kenta Matsudaira	(China) Zhou Yu (China) Wang Hao	8-11, 11–7, 11–7, 11–6, 12–10
Runner-up	June, 2013	Japan Open; Japan	World Tour Super Series	(Japan) Kenta Matsudaira	(Japan) Jin Ueda (Japan) Maharu Yoshimura	11-7, 8–11, 6–11, 8–11
Runner-up	August, 2013	Harmony Open; China	World Tour	(Japan) Kenta Matsudaira	(China) Ma Long (China) Xu Xin	11-7, 4–11, 7–11, 5–11
Runner-up	March, 2016	Qatar Open; Qatar	World Tour Super	(Japan) Maharu Yoshimura	(China) Fan Zhendong (China) Zhang Jike	8-11, 9–11, 7–11
Runner-up	April, 2016	Polish Open; Poland	World Tour Major	(Japan) Maharu Yoshimura	(Japan) Masataka Morizono (Japan) Yuya Oshima	14-16, 8–11, 8–11
Runner-up	June, 2017	LION Japan Open; Japan	World Tour Platinum	(Japan) Maharu Yoshimura	(China) Ma Long (China) Xu Xin	9-11, 3–11, 7–11
Win	September, 2017	Austrian Open; Austria	World Tour Platinum	(Japan) Jin Ueda	(Germany) Filus Ruwen (Germany) Walther Ricardo	11-7, 9–11, 11–9, 11–8

=== ITTF Junior & U21 Singles Titles: 8 ===
No.	Date	Tournament	Tier	Opponent	Score
1.	July 2008	Tahiti Junior Open, French Polynesia	Junior Circuit Cadet Boys	(Japan) Asuka Machi	11-9, 10–12, 7–11, 11–8, 11–7
2.	July 2008	Tahiti Junior Open, French Polynesia	Junior Circuit Junior Boys	(Japan) Yuki Hirano	11-9, 11–5, 7–11, 9–11, 8–11, 11–3, 7–11
3.	November 2008	Cadet Challenge & Junior Circuit Finals	Junior Boys	(Egypt) Omar Assar	11-8, 11–9, 9–11, 11–9, 11–8
4.	March 2010	German Open	Pro Tour U21	(Japan) Hiromitsu Kasahara	11-6, 11–9, 11–7, 11–5
5.	October 2010	JOOLA Hungarian Open, Hungary	Pro Tour U21	(China) Liu Yanan	11-4, 11–1, 7–11, 11–7, 11–9
6.	February 2011	German Open, Germany	Pro Tour U21	(South Korea) Kim Min-seok	9-11, 6–11, 11–8, 11–7, 10–12, 11–8, 11–6
7.	June 2011	KRA Korea Open, Korea	Pro Tour U21	(South Korea) Jeoung Young-sik	11-5, 11–7, 9–11,9-11,6-11,11-7
8.	November 2011	Volkswagen World Junior Table Tennis Championships, Bahrain	Junior Boys	(China) Lin Gaoyuan	3-11, 11–6, 7–11, 11–8, 13–11, 11–9

=== ITTF Junior & U21 Doubles Titles: 5 ===
No.	Date	Tournament	Tier	Partner	Opponents	Score
1.	July 2008	Tahiti Junior Open, French Polynesia	Junior Circuit Cadet Boys	(Japan) Asuka Machi	(New Zealand) Kong Lingnan (New Zealand) Wu Kevin	11-9, 11–5, 11–4
2.	July 2008	Tahiti Junior Open, French Polynesia	Junior Circuit Junior Boys	(Japan) Asuka Machi	(Japan) Yuki Hirano (Japan) Kohei Morimoto	6-11, 15–13, 11–8, 11–6
3.	September 2008	Indian Junior Open, India	Junior Circuit Junior Boys	(Japan) Yuki Hirano	(Japan) Kaito Fujimoto (Japan) Kohei Morimoto	5-11, 11–7, 11–5, 9–11, 11–7
4.	October 2009	Cadet Challenge & Junior Circuit Finals	Cadet Boys	(Japan) Asuka Machi	(Hong Kong) Chiu Chung Hei (China) Yin Hang	11-6, 8–11, 11–5, 11–7
5.	December 2010	World Junior Table Tennis Championships, Slovakia	Junior Boys	(Japan) Asuka Machi	(France) Simon Gauzy (France) Quentin Robinot	11-9, 11–9, 11–6, 12–14, 11–4

== Record against top-10 players ==
Niwa's match record against those who have been ranked in the top 10, with those who have been No. 1 in bold:

- (Germany) Dimitrij Ovtcharov: 1–5
- (China) Fan Zhendong: 0–6
- (Germany) Timo Boll: 0–2
- (China) Lin Gaoyuan: 2–3
- (China) Xu Xin: 2–1
- (China) Ma Long: 1–6
- (Hong Kong) Wong Chun Ting: 1–1
- (France) Simon Gauzy: 2–1
- (Japan) Kenta Matsudaira: 2–2
- (Japan) Jun Mizutani: 1–1
- (Japan) Tomokazu Harimoto: 2–2
- (South Korea) Lee Sang-su: 4–1
- (South Korea) Jeoung Young-sik: 3–1
- (South Korea) Joo Sae-hyuk: 0–1
- (Portugal) Marcos Freitas: 3–2
- (Chinese Taipei) Chuang Chih-yuan: 0–7
- (China) Fang Bo: 0–1
- (Belarus) Vladimir Samsonov: 0–1
- (China) Zhang Jike: 1–2
- (Singapore) Gao Ning: 3–1
- (China) Yan An: 1–3

== Wins over top 10 players ==
No.	Player	Rank	Date	Event	Rd	Score	Niwa Rank
1.	(China) Ma Long	1	April 2012	Asian Olympic Qualification Tournament	F	8-11,11-4,11-8,12-10, 5–11, 11–9	19
2.	(China) Yan An	8	August 2013	World Tour Harmony Open, China	4R	7-11, 11–9, 11–9, 11–6, 4–11, 5–11, 13–11	18
3.	(Japan) Jun Mizutani	5	November 2014	World Tour Airports of Regions Russian Open, Russia	SF	11-6,11-4, 11–9, 11–8	15
4.	(China) Xu Xin	2	March 2015	GAC Group Asian Cup		11-6, 2–11, 11–5, 12–10	12
5.	(Hong Kong) Wong Chun Ting	8	August 2016	Summer Olympics	4R	6-11, 11–6, 8–11, 5–11, 12–10, 11–4, 11–8	22
6.	(China) Zhang Jike	4	February 2017	World Tour Platinum Qatar Open	2R	11-1, 11–0, 11–0, 11–0	19
7.	(China) Xu Xin	3	April 2017	2017 Asian Championships	QF	12-10, 5–11, 11–8, 11–7	13
8.	(Germany) Dimitrij Ovtcharov	5	June 2017	World Table Tennis Championships	4R	11-13. 11–9, 11–13, 12–10, 11–5, 9–11, 11–9	11
