= Gu Yuting =

Chinese table tennis player

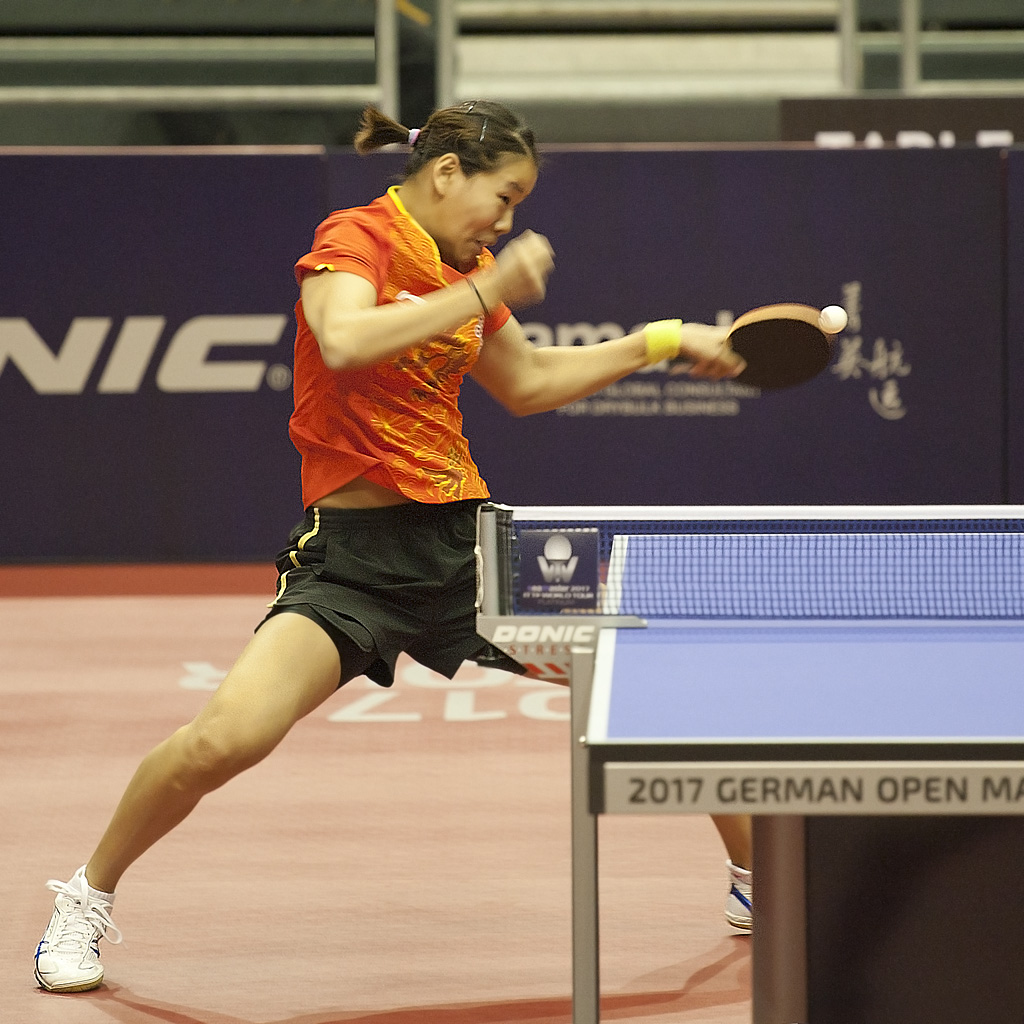
- Gu at the 2017 German Open

Personal information
- Native name: 顾玉婷
- Born: 14 January 1995 (age 31) Dongying, Shandong, China

Sport
- Sport: Table tennis
- Highest ranking: 11 (July 2018)
Medal record
Women's table tennis
Representing China
Youth Olympic Games
Gold medal – first place	2010 Singapore	Singles
World Junior Championships
Gold medal – first place	2009 Cartagena	Doubles
Gold medal – first place	2009 Cartagena	Mixed doubles
Gold medal – first place	2009 Cartagena	Team
Gold medal – first place	2010 Bratislava	Doubles
Gold medal – first place	2010 Bratislava	Mixed doubles
Gold medal – first place	2011 Manama	Doubles
Gold medal – first place	2011 Manama	Team
Gold medal – first place	2012 Hyderabad	Doubles
Gold medal – first place	2012 Hyderabad	Team
Gold medal – first place	2013 Rabat	Singles
Gold medal – first place	2013 Rabat	Doubles
Gold medal – first place	2013 Rabat	Team
Silver medal – second place	2009 Cartagena	Singles
Silver medal – second place	2010 Bratislava	Team
Silver medal – second place	2011 Manama	Mixed doubles
Silver medal – second place	2012 Hyderabad	Singles
Silver medal – second place	2013 Rabat	Mixed doubles
Bronze medal – third place	2011 Manama	Singles
Asian Youth Games
Gold medal – first place	2009 Singapore	Mixed doubles
Gold medal – first place	2009 Singapore	Mixed team
Silver medal – second place	2009 Singapore	Singles
Representing (International Olympic Committee) Mixed-NOCs
Youth Olympic Games
Bronze medal – third place	2010 Singapore	Mixed team

Gu Yuting (Chinese: 顾玉婷; pinyin: Gù Yùtíng; born January 14, 1995) is a Chinese table tennis player. She won a gold medal in the women's singles event at the 2010 Summer Youth Olympics. In addition, Gu holds the distinction of having competed at the World Junior Table Tennis Championships for five straight years (2009–13) and winning the world junior girls' doubles title on all five occasions. Gu retired in 2021.
