= Zhou Yu (table tennis) =

Chinese table tennis player

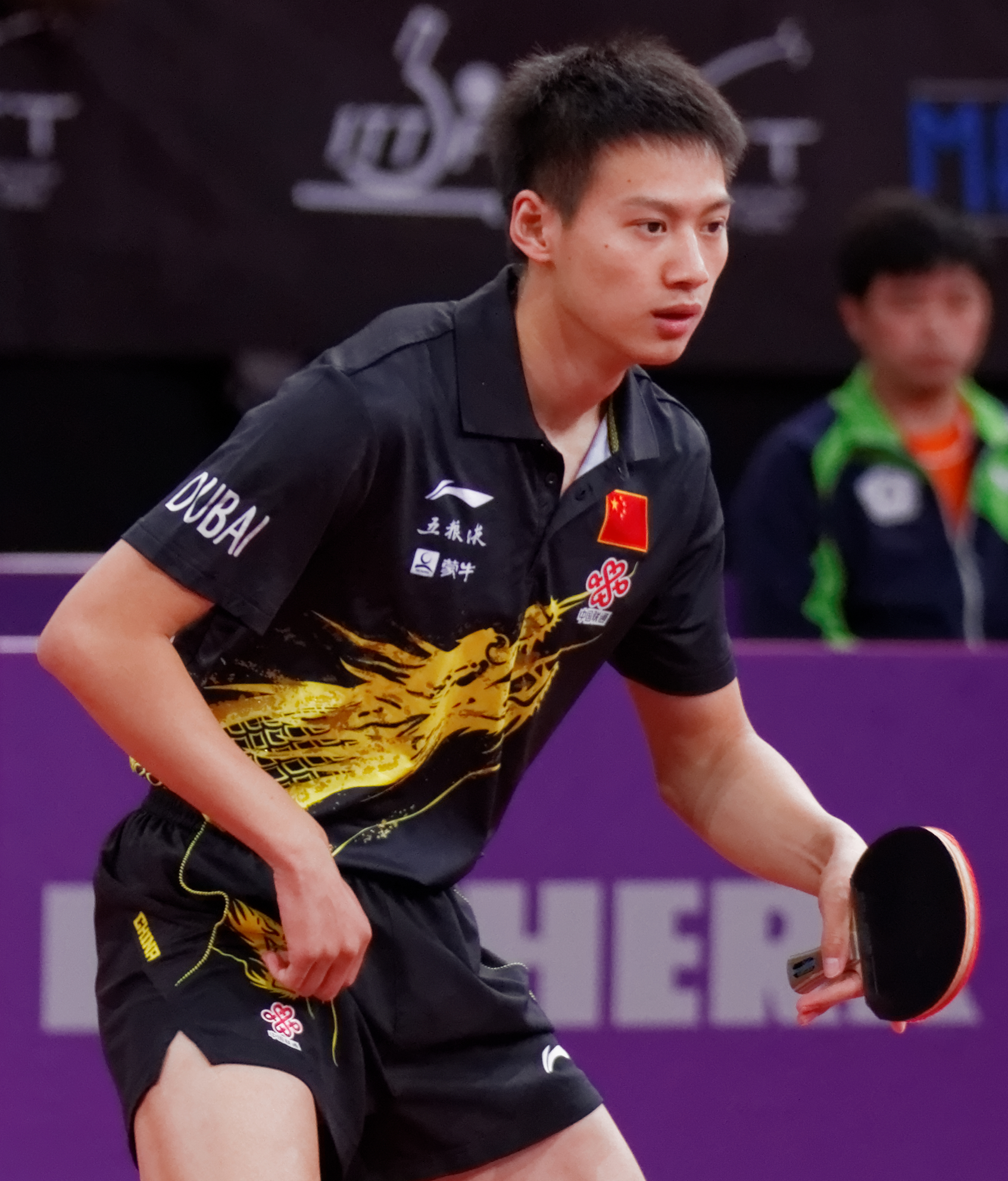

Personal information
- Native name: 周雨
- Nationality: Chinese
- Born: 19 May 1992 (age 34) Siyang County, Jiangsu
- Height: 1.77 m (5 ft 10 in)
- Weight: 66 kg (146 lb)

Sport
- Sport: Table tennis
- Playing style: Left-handed, shakehand grip
- Equipment: Viscaria, Dhs h3 National blue (FH), Tenergy 05 (BH)
- Highest ranking: 13 (March 2014)
Medal record
Men's table tennis
Representing China
World Championships
Silver medal – second place	2015 Suzhou	Doubles
Bronze medal – third place	2013 Paris	Doubles
Asian Games
Gold medal – first place	2014 Incheon	Team

Zhou Yu (Chinese: 周雨; pinyin: Zhōu Yǔ; born 19 May 1992) is a Chinese male table tennis player. In 2012, he won Chinese National Championships at the age of twenty. He is the medalist in men's doubles event at both the 2013 and 2015 World Championships.
