= Fang Bo =

Chinese table tennis player

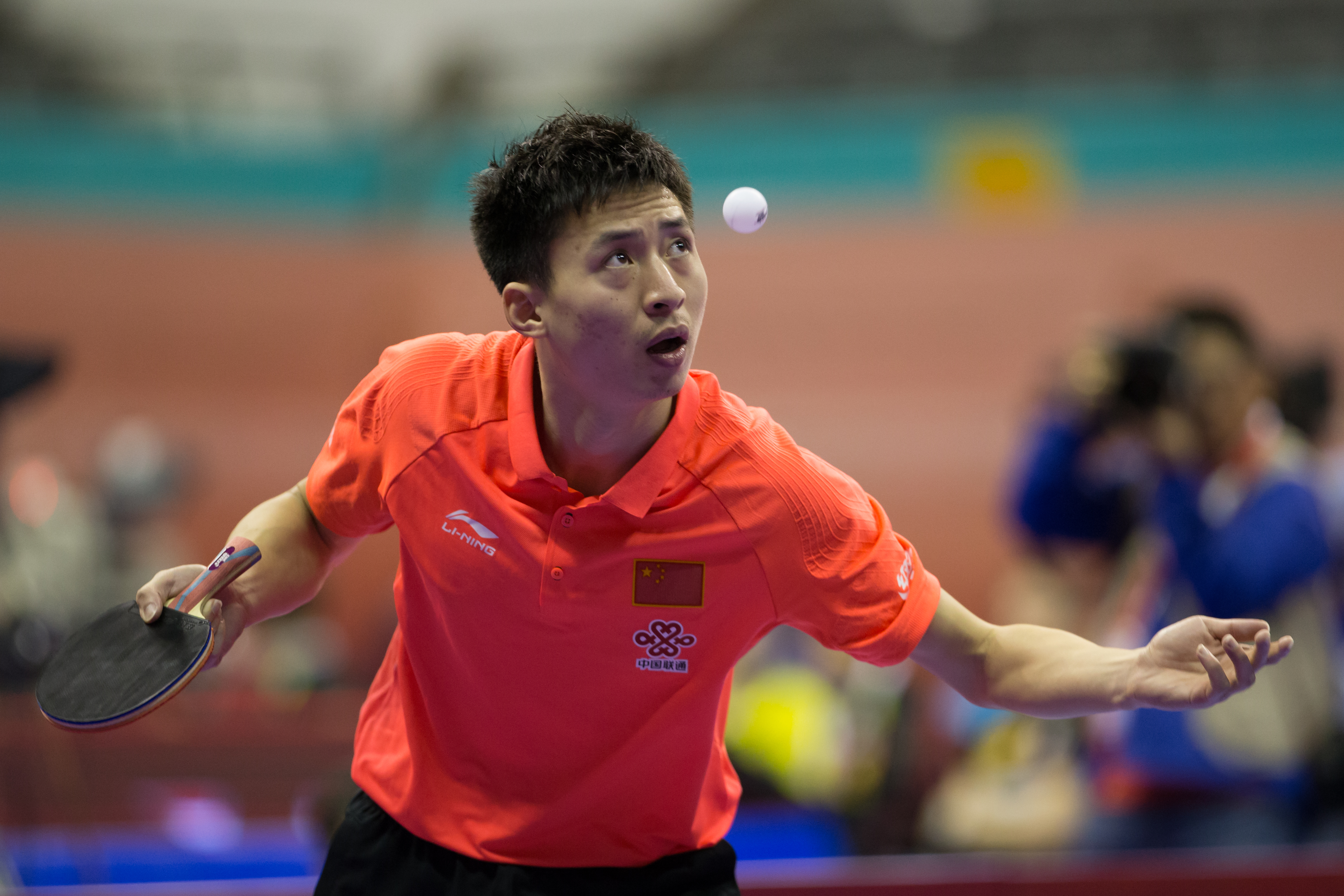
- Fang Bo at the 2016 World Championships

Personal information
- Native name: 方博
- Nationality: Chinese
- Born: 6 November 1992 (age 34) Tongcheng County, Hubei
- Height: 1.76 m (5 ft 9 in)

Sport
- Sport: Table tennis
- Playing style: Right-handed, shakehand grip
- Equipment: Butterfly Viscara, DHS Hurricane 3 (blue sponge) (FH), DHS Hurricane 3 (orange sponge) (BH)
- Highest ranking: 8 (May 2015)
- Current ranking: 157 (28 September 2026)
Medal record
Representing China
World Championships
Gold medal – first place	2016 Kuala Lumpur	Team
Silver medal – second place	2015 Suzhou	Singles
Bronze medal – third place	2017 Düsseldorf	Mixed doubles
Asian Championships
Silver medal – second place	2017 Wuxi	Doubles
Bronze medal – third place	2017 Wuxi	Mixed doubles
ITTF World Tour
Gold medal – first place	2013 Austrian Open	Singles
Gold medal – first place	2015 Swedish Open	Doubles
Gold medal – first place	2017 Hungarian Open	Doubles
Silver medal – second place	2014 Korea Open	Singles
Silver medal – second place	2014 Swedish Open	Singles
Silver medal – second place	2015 China Open	Doubles
All China Table Tennis Championships
Silver medal – second place	2018 Anshan	Singles

Fang Bo (Chinese: 方博; pinyin: Fāng Bó; born November 6, 1992) is a Chinese male table tennis player. In 2002, Fang Bo became a member of the Shandong Luneng table tennis club. In 2009, he joined the China national table tennis first team. In the same year, he won all four team and individual titles at the 2009 World Junior Championships becoming the first youth player to accomplish this feat in China. At his peak in 2015, he reached the men's singles final at the World Championships by defeating the second-seeded Xu Xin and the defending champion Zhang Jike. Fang Bo then obtained his first world table tennis champion title in 2016 during the World Team Table Tennis Championships. In 2017, he partnered with Petrissa Solja of the German table tennis team and won bronze in the mixed doubles at the World Championships in Düsseldorf, Germany. Fang Bo was ranked fifth in the China National Table Tennis (First) Team after emerging as first runner-up of the 2018 China National Table Tennis Championships. In 2019, Fang Bo successfully led his teammates and Team Tian Jin to win the overall team gold medal in the 2019 China Super League. Concomitantly, Fang Bo represented UMMC at the ETTU Table Tennis Champions League and the team came in second after losing 2:3 to Fakel Gazprom Orenburg in the final leg.

Fang Bo announced his retirement from the Chinese national team in 2021. In 2026, Fang came out of retirement to represent Kazakhstan.
