= Table tennis at the 2010 Asian Games – Men's team =

Men's team at the 2010 Asian Games
- Venue: Guangzhou Gymnasium
- Dates: 13–16 November 2010
- Competitors: 68 from 15 nations

Medalists
gold medal	China; Ma Lin, Ma Long, Wang Hao, Xu Xin, Zhang Jike
silver medal	South Korea; Jeoung Young-sik, Joo Sae-hyuk, Kim Min-seok, Lee Jung-woo, Oh Sang-eun
bronze medal	Japan; Seiya Kishikawa, Kenta Matsudaira, Jun Mizutani, Koki Niwa, Kaii Yoshida
bronze medal	North Korea; Jang Song-man, Kim Chol-jin, Kim Hyok-bong, Kim Nam-chol, Ri Chol-guk

The men's team table tennis event was part of the table tennis programme and took place between November 13 and 16, at the Guangzhou Gymnasium.

== Schedule ==
All times are China Standard Time (UTC+08:00)

Date	Time	Event
Saturday, 13 November 2010	12:00	Round robin 1
Saturday, 13 November 2010	16:00	Round robin 2
Sunday, 14 November 2010	12:00	Round robin 3
Sunday, 14 November 2010	20:00	Quarterfinals
Monday, 15 November 2010	19:00	Semifinals
Tuesday, 16 November 2010	19:30	Final

== Results ==
=== Round robin ===
==== Group A ====
Pos	Team	Pld	W	L	MF	MA	Pts	Qualification
1	China	3	3	0	9	0	6	Quarterfinals
2	North Korea	3	2	1	6	3	5	Quarterfinals
3	Qatar	3	1	2	3	6	4	
4	Laos	3	0	3	0	9	3	

Source: ATTU

13 November	China	3–0	North Korea

Wang Hao	3–1	Kim Hyok-bong	11–4, 12–14, 12–10, 11–5
Ma Lin	3–1	Jang Song-man	11–7, 14–12, 8–11, 11–5
Ma Long	3–0	Ri Chol-guk	11–8, 11–5, 11–8

13 November	Laos	0–3	Qatar

Thavisack Phathaphone	0–3	Waleed Al-Hajjai	7–11, 7–11, 2–11
Chansamone Khunladsuvannavong	0–3	Ahmed Al-Mohannadi	4–11, 8–11, 7–11
Sengsathid Sukathammavong	0–3	Fahed Al-Mughanne	7–11, 8–11, 8–11

13 November	Laos	0–3	North Korea

Thavisack Phathaphone	0–3	Kim Chol-jin	4–11, 4–11, 1–11
Chansamone Khunladsuvannavong	0–3	Kim Nam-chol	3–11, 3–11, 7–11
Sengsathid Sukathammavong	0–3	Kim Hyok-bong	3–11, 6–11, 5–11

13 November	Qatar	0–3	China

Mohammed Al-Saadi	0–3	Zhang Jike	2–11, 1–11, 8–11
Fahed Al-Mughanne	0–3	Xu Xin	2–11, 3–11, 2–11
Waleed Al-Hajjai	0–3	Wang Hao	6–11, 2–11, 6–11

14 November	China	3–0	Laos

Ma Long	3–0	Thavisack Phathaphone	11–2, 11–4, 11–2
Zhang Jike	3–0	Chansamone Khunladsuvannavong	11–3, 11–2, 11–3
Ma Lin	3–0	Sengsathid Sukathammavong	11–5, 11–3, 11–4

14 November	North Korea	3–0	Qatar

Jang Song-man	3–0	Fahed Al-Mughanne	11–8, 11–6, 11–4
Ri Chol-guk	3–0	Ahmed Al-Mohannadi	11–8, 11–5, 11–7
Kim Hyok-bong	3–0	Mohammed Al-Saadi	11–6, 11–6, 11–3

==== Group B ====
Pos	Team	Pld	W	L	MF	MA	Pts	Qualification
1	South Korea	3	3	0	9	0	6	Quarterfinals
2	Singapore	3	2	1	6	3	5	Quarterfinals
3	Saudi Arabia	3	1	2	3	6	4	
4	Mongolia	3	0	3	0	9	3	

Source: ATTU

13 November	Saudi Arabia	0–3	South Korea

Naif Al-Jadai	0–3	Lee Jung-woo	7–11, 7–11, 2–11
Raed Al-Taher	0–3	Oh Sang-eun	2–11, 3–11, 4–11
Abdulaziz Al-Abbad	0–3	Joo Sae-hyuk	8–11, 8–11, 8–11

13 November	Singapore	3–0	Mongolia

Gao Ning	3–0	Bibishyn Bayarmagnai	11–5, 11–6, 11–7
Yang Zi	3–0	Lkhagvadorjiin Altantulga	11–2, 11–2, 11–5
Ma Liang	3–0	Myalyn Ariunbold	11–6, 11–3, 11–5

13 November	Singapore	0–3	South Korea

Gao Ning	0–3	Oh Sang-eun	4–11, 5–11, 13–15
Ma Liang	1–3	Joo Sae-hyuk	15–13, 7–11, 11–13, 4–11
Yang Zi	2–3	Lee Jung-woo	11–3, 9–11, 11–7, 4–11, 6–11

13 November	Saudi Arabia	3–0	Mongolia

Raed Al-Taher	3–1	Bibishyn Bayarmagnai	11–6, 11–5, 4–11, 11–8
Naif Al-Jadai	3–0	Lkhagvadorjiin Altantulga	11–5, 11–4, 11–6
Abdulaziz Al-Abbad	3–0	Myalyn Ariunbold	11–5, 14–12, 11–4

14 November	South Korea	3–0	Mongolia

Jeoung Young-sik	3–0	Bibishyn Bayarmagnai	11–4, 11–2, 12–10
Kim Min-seok	3–0	Lkhagvadorjiin Altantulga	11–7, 11–4, 11–5
Lee Jung-woo	3–0	Myalyn Ariunbold	11–5, 11–3, 11–3

14 November	Saudi Arabia	0–3	Singapore

Naif Al-Jadai	0–3	Yang Zi	3–11, 9–11, 5–11
Raed Al-Taher	0–3	Gao Ning	6–11, 2–11, 6–11
Abdulaziz Al-Abbad	0–3	Ma Liang	8–11, 9–11, 4–11

==== Group C ====
Pos	Team	Pld	W	L	MF	MA	Pts	Qualification
1	Japan	3	3	0	9	2	6	Quarterfinals
2	Hong Kong	3	2	1	8	3	5	Quarterfinals
3	Iran	3	1	2	3	6	4	
4	Nepal	3	0	3	0	9	3	

Source: ATTU

13 November	Hong Kong	3–0	Iran

Li Ching	3–0	Afshin Norouzi	11–4, 11–8, 11–7
Jiang Tianyi	3–2	Noshad Alamian	7–11, 8–11, 11–9, 11–7, 11–4
Cheung Yuk	3–0	Mohammad Reza Akhlaghpasand	11–6, 12–10, 11–7

13 November	Japan	3–0	Nepal

Jun Mizutani	3–0	Purshottam Bajracharya	11–2, 11–7, 11–8
Kaii Yoshida	3–0	Ajay Suwal	11–3, 11–2, 11–5
Kenta Matsudaira	3–0	Shiva Sundar Gothe	11–1, 11–2, 11–8

13 November	Hong Kong	2–3	Japan

Li Ching	3–1	Kenta Matsudaira	11–9, 12–10, 5–11, 11–8
Jiang Tianyi	0–3	Jun Mizutani	2–11, 6–11, 6–11
Cheung Yuk	3–1	Kaii Yoshida	7–11, 11–9, 11–9, 11–8
Li Ching	2–3	Jun Mizutani	11–9, 6–11, 7–11, 11–9, 8–11
Jiang Tianyi	2–3	Kenta Matsudaira	12–10, 9–11, 8–11, 11–9, 9–11

13 November	Iran	3–0	Nepal

Noshad Alamian	3–0	Chandan Shahi	11–8, 11–2, 11–4
Mohammad Reza Akhlaghpasand	3–0	Purshottam Bajracharya	11–5, 11–4, 11–5
Afshin Norouzi	3–0	Ajay Suwal	11–2, 11–6, 11–5

14 November	Hong Kong	3–0	Nepal

Tang Peng	3–0	Ajay Suwal	11–1, 11–7, 11–7
Jiang Tianyi	3–0	Purshottam Bajracharya	11–5, 11–3, 11–6
Ko Lai Chak	3–0	Ranjit Singh Rayamajhi	11–5, 11–2, 11–2

14 November	Iran	0–3	Japan

Noshad Alamian	0–3	Seiya Kishikawa	7–11, 10–12, 8–11
Mohammad Reza Akhlaghpasand	2–3	Kaii Yoshida	11–6, 8–11, 12–10, 6–11, 3–11
Afshin Norouzi	2–3	Koki Niwa	11–9, 8–11, 11–6, 10–12, 2–11

==== Group D ====
Pos	Team	Pld	W	L	MF	MA	Pts	Qualification
1	Chinese Taipei	2	2	0	6	0	4	Quarterfinals
2	India	2	1	1	3	4	3	Quarterfinals
3	Vietnam	2	0	2	1	6	2	

Source: ATTU

13 November	Chinese Taipei	3–0	India

Chuang Chih-yuan	3–0	Anthony Amalraj	11–9, 11–3, 11–6
Wu Chih-chi	3–1	Sharath Kamal	7–11, 11–9, 14–12, 13–11
Chen Chien-an	3–2	Soumyadeep Roy	5–11, 11–8, 15–13, 9–11, 11–9

13 November	Vietnam	0–3	Chinese Taipei

Đoàn Kiến Quốc	1–3	Wu Chih-chi	8–11, 9–11, 11–9, 6–11
Trần Tuấn Quỳnh	1–3	Chuang Chih-yuan	8–11, 13–11, 2–11, 3–11
Đinh Quang Linh	0–3	Huang Sheng-sheng	6–11, 6–11, 9–11

14 November	India	3–1	Vietnam

Sharath Kamal	3–1	Trần Tuấn Quỳnh	11–3, 12–10, 9–11, 14–12
Anthony Amalraj	1–3	Đoàn Kiến Quốc	9–11, 11–7, 10–12, 7–11
Soumyadeep Roy	3–1	Phan Huy Hoàng	9–11, 11–4, 11–7, 11–5
Sharath Kamal	3–1	Đoàn Kiến Quốc	13–11, 11–9, 6–11, 11–6

=== Knockout round ===
Quarterfinals
A1	China	3
Singapore	0
India	1
C1	Japan	3
D1	Chinese Taipei	2
North Korea	3
Hong Kong	0
B1	South Korea	3

Semifinals
A1	China	3
C1	Japan	0
North Korea	0
B1	South Korea	3

Final
A1	China	3
B1	South Korea	0

==== Quarterfinals ====
14 November	Singapore	0–3	China

Gao Ning	1–3	Ma Long	6–11, 2–11, 11–6, 6–11
Yang Zi	1–3	Wang Hao	11–8, 6–11, 6–11, 8–11
Ma Liang	0–3	Ma Lin	5–11, 2–11, 5–11

14 November	India	1–3	Japan

Sharath Kamal	3–0	Kenta Matsudaira	11–7, 12–10, 11–6
Anthony Amalraj	0–3	Jun Mizutani	10–12, 5–11, 9–11
Soumyadeep Roy	1–3	Seiya Kishikawa	8–11, 11–9, 8–11, 5–11
Sharath Kamal	1–3	Jun Mizutani	9–11, 6–11, 11–6, 8–11

14 November	North Korea	3–2	Chinese Taipei

Kim Hyok-bong	3–1	Chen Chien-an	11–9, 7–11, 11–8, 11–2
Jang Song-man	3–1	Chuang Chih-yuan	7–11, 11–6, 11–6, 11–5
Ri Chol-guk	1–3	Wu Chih-chi	14–16, 11–8, 13–15, 7–11
Kim Hyok-bong	1–3	Chuang Chih-yuan	9–11, 9–11, 11–9, 8–11
Jang Song-man	3–0	Chen Chien-an	11–4, 11–7, 11–6

14 November	South Korea	3–0	Hong Kong

Oh Sang-eun	3–2	Li Ching	13–15, 14–12, 10–12, 11–6, 11–7
Joo Sae-hyuk	3–1	Tang Peng	11–9, 7–11, 11–6, 11–9
Lee Jung-woo	3–2	Cheung Yuk	6–11, 11–6, 12–10, 10–12, 11–4

==== Semifinals ====
15 November	China	3–0	Japan

Wang Hao	3–1	Kenta Matsudaira	14–12, 11–7, 10–12, 11–5
Xu Xin	3–0	Jun Mizutani	12–10, 11–8, 11–7
Zhang Jike	3–1	Seiya Kishikawa	10–12, 11–7, 11–6, 11–5

15 November	South Korea	3–0	North Korea

Oh Sang-eun	3–0	Ri Chol-guk	11–6, 11–7, 12–10
Joo Sae-hyuk	3–1	Kim Hyok-bong	11–8, 8–11, 11–8, 11–7
Lee Jung-woo	3–0	Kim Chol-jin	13–11, 11–1, 11–9

==== Final ====
16 November	China	3–0	South Korea

Wang Hao	3–0	Oh Sang-eun	11–7, 11–5, 11–8
Ma Lin	3–0	Joo Sae-hyuk	11–3, 11–7, 11–9
Ma Long	3–0	Lee Jung-woo	11–9, 11–6, 11–4

== Non-participating athletes ==
- Subhajit Saha (IND)
- Sanil Shetty (IND)
- Khalid Al-Harbi (KSA)
- Bounyiem Nhotsavansouk (LAO)
- Ahmed Al-Awlaqi (QAT)
- Cai Xiaoli (SIN)
- Pang Xuejie (SIN)
- Chou Tung-yu (TPE)
