= Table tennis at the 2010 Asian Games – Men's doubles =

Men's doubles at the 2010 Asian Games
- Venue: Guangzhou Gymnasium
- Dates: 16–19 November 2010
- Competitors: 64 from 20 nations

Medalists
gold medal	Wang Hao; Zhang Jike	China
silver medal	Ma Lin; Xu Xin	China
bronze medal	Jeoung Young-sik; Kim Min-seok	South Korea
bronze medal	Kenta Matsudaira; Koki Niwa	Japan

The men's doubles table tennis event was part of the table tennis programme and took place between November 16 and 19, at the Guangzhou Gymnasium.

== Schedule ==
All times are China Standard Time (UTC+08:00)

Date	Time	Event
Tuesday, 16 November 2010	10:45	1/16 round
Thursday, 18 November 2010	11:30	1/8 finals
Thursday, 18 November 2010	15:00	Quarterfinals
Friday, 19 November 2010	11:00	Semifinals
Friday, 19 November 2010	20:00	Final

== Results ==
Legend

- WO — Won by walkover

=== Finals ===
Semifinals									Final
1	Wang Hao (CHN); Zhang Jike (CHN)	11	11	11	7	5	11	11
8	Jeoung Young-sik (KOR); Kim Min-seok (KOR)	4	4	13	11	11	3	6	1	Wang Hao (CHN); Zhang Jike (CHN)	11	12	10	9	11	11
	Kenta Matsudaira (JPN); Koki Niwa (JPN)	6	11	6	6	5			2	Ma Lin (CHN); Xu Xin (CHN)	2	10	12	11	5	3
2	Ma Lin (CHN); Xu Xin (CHN)	11	8	11	11	11

=== Top half ===
==== Section 1 ====
1/16 round
1	Wang Hao (CHN); Zhang Jike (CHN)	11	11	11
Mohammad Reza Akhlaghpasand (IRI); Noshad Alamian (IRI)	9	6	6
Bounyiem Nhotsavansouk (LAO); Sengsathid Sukathammavong (LAO)
Rashed Mohamed (UAE); Rashed Abdulhamid (UAE)	W	O
Kim Nam-chol (PRK); Ri Chol-guk (PRK)	11	11	18
Ma Liang (SIN); Pang Xuejie (SIN)	3	8	16
Anthony Amalraj (IND); Soumyadeep Roy (IND)	5	5	7
6	Cheung Yuk (HKG); Li Ching (HKG)	11	11	11

1/8 finals
1	Wang Hao (CHN); Zhang Jike (CHN)	11	11	11
Rashed Mohamed (UAE); Rashed Abdulhamid (UAE)	7	6	4
Kim Nam-chol (PRK); Ri Chol-guk (PRK)	8	11	5
6	Cheung Yuk (HKG); Li Ching (HKG)	11	13	11

Quarterfinals
1	Wang Hao (CHN); Zhang Jike (CHN)	11	11	11
6	Cheung Yuk (HKG); Li Ching (HKG)	7	7	7

==== Section 2 ====
1/16 round
8	Jeoung Young-sik (KOR); Kim Min-seok (KOR)	11	11	11
Ahmed Al-Mohannadi (QAT); Fahed Al-Mughanne (QAT)	6	2	3
Shiva Sundar Gothe (NEP); Ajay Suwal (NEP)	11	11	9	11
Inom Saidov (TJK); Akbarbek Yakhiaev (TJK)	3	7	11	7
Bibishyn Bayarmagnai (MGL); Lkhagvadorjiin Altantulga (MGL)	9	6	9
Đinh Quang Linh (VIE); Đoàn Kiến Quốc (VIE)	11	11	11
Chuang Chih-yuan (TPE); Wu Chih-chi (TPE)	9	8	12	11	12
3	Seiya Kishikawa (JPN); Jun Mizutani (JPN)	11	11	10	6	10

1/8 finals
8	Jeoung Young-sik (KOR); Kim Min-seok (KOR)	11	11	11
Shiva Sundar Gothe (NEP); Ajay Suwal (NEP)	4	8	2
Đinh Quang Linh (VIE); Đoàn Kiến Quốc (VIE)	7	11	11	13
Chuang Chih-yuan (TPE); Wu Chih-chi (TPE)	11	7	4	11

Quarterfinals
8	Jeoung Young-sik (KOR); Kim Min-seok (KOR)	12	9	12	11
Đinh Quang Linh (VIE); Đoàn Kiến Quốc (VIE)	10	11	10	7

=== Bottom half ===
==== Section 3 ====
1/16 round
4	Lee Jung-woo (KOR); Oh Sang-eun (KOR)	11	11	11
Chang Hoi Wa (MAC); Leong Kin Wa (MAC)	5	8	7
Husain Al-Bahrani (IOC); Mansour Al-Enezi (IOC)	7	4	4
Sharath Kamal (IND); Subhajit Saha (IND)	11	11	11
Kenta Matsudaira (JPN); Koki Niwa (JPN)	11	11	11	11
Kim Chol-jin (PRK); Kim Hyok-bong (PRK)	13	9	3	7
Purshottam Bajracharya (NEP); Ranjit Singh Rayamajhi (NEP)	4	7	8
5	Jiang Tianyi (HKG); Tang Peng (HKG)	11	11	11

1/8 finals
4	Lee Jung-woo (KOR); Oh Sang-eun (KOR)	11	11	11
Sharath Kamal (IND); Subhajit Saha (IND)	9	6	4
Kenta Matsudaira (JPN); Koki Niwa (JPN)	12	11	11
5	Jiang Tianyi (HKG); Tang Peng (HKG)	10	6	8

Quarterfinals
4	Lee Jung-woo (KOR); Oh Sang-eun (KOR)	11	7	5	18	7
Kenta Matsudaira (JPN); Koki Niwa (JPN)	3	11	11	16	11

==== Section 4 ====
1/16 round
7	Gao Ning (SIN); Yang Zi (SIN)	11	11	11
Ibrahim Abukeshek (PLE); Hatem Wadi (PLE)	5	5	1
Chansamone Khunladsuvannavong (LAO); Thavisack Phathaphone (LAO)	9	7	5
Chou Tung-yu (TPE); Huang Sheng-sheng (TPE)	11	11	11
Francisco de Yesus (TLS); Alheiro dos Santos (TLS)	4	3	4
Mohammed Al-Saadi (QAT); Waleed Al-Hajjai (QAT)	11	11	11
Phan Huy Hoàng (VIE); Trần Tuấn Quỳnh (VIE)	7	2	4
2	Ma Lin (CHN); Xu Xin (CHN)	11	11	11

1/8 finals
7	Gao Ning (SIN); Yang Zi (SIN)	11	11	15
Chou Tung-yu (TPE); Huang Sheng-sheng (TPE)	4	7	13
Mohammed Al-Saadi (QAT); Waleed Al-Hajjai (QAT)	1	4	3
2	Ma Lin (CHN); Xu Xin (CHN)	11	11	11

Quarterfinals
7	Gao Ning (SIN); Yang Zi (SIN)	11	3	8	4
2	Ma Lin (CHN); Xu Xin (CHN)	6	11	11	11
