= Table tennis at the 2005 Islamic Solidarity Games =

Table tennis at the 2005 Islamic Solidarity Games was held in King Fahad Air Base Sport Hall, Ta'if from April 9 to April 16, 2005.

== Medalists ==
Event	Gold	Silver	Bronze
Singles	Ahmed Saleh; Egypt	El-Sayed Lashin; Egypt	Ahmed Nadim; Egypt
Singles	Ahmed Saleh; Egypt	El-Sayed Lashin; Egypt	Mohammad Reza Akhlaghpasand; Iran
Doubles	Egypt; El-Sayed Lashin; Ahmed Saleh	Iran; Mehran Ahadi; Afshin Norouzi	Iran; Mohammad Reza Akhlaghpasand; Shahram Sarbakhshian
Doubles	Egypt; El-Sayed Lashin; Ahmed Saleh	Iran; Mehran Ahadi; Afshin Norouzi	Saudi Arabia; Khaled Al-Harbi; Abdulaziz Al-Abbad
Team	Egypt; El-Sayed Lashin; Emad Moselhi; Ahmed Nadim; Ahmed Saleh; Ashraf Sobhy	Iran; Mehran Ahadi; Mohammad Reza Akhlaghpasand; Medea Lotfollahnasabi; Afshin Norouzi; Shahram Sarbakhshian	Algeria; Talahy Bilal; Mohamaed Boudjadja; Abdel Hakim Djaziri; Taher Khallaf; Fateh Ourahmoune
Team	Egypt; El-Sayed Lashin; Emad Moselhi; Ahmed Nadim; Ahmed Saleh; Ashraf Sobhy	Iran; Mehran Ahadi; Mohammad Reza Akhlaghpasand; Medea Lotfollahnasabi; Afshin Norouzi; Shahram Sarbakhshian	Saudi Arabia; Abdulaziz Al-Abbad; Nayef Al-Geady; Khaled Al-Harbi; Mansor Alem

== Medal table ==
Rank	Nation	Gold	Silver	Bronze	Total
1	Egypt (EGY)	3	1	1	5
2	Iran (IRI)	0	2	2	4
3	Saudi Arabia (KSA)	0	0	2	2
4	Algeria (ALG)	0	0	1	1
Totals (4 entries)		3	3	6	12
