= 2012 World Team Table Tennis Championships – Men's team =

2012 men's team

The men's team tournament of the 2012 World Team Table Tennis Championships was held from March 25 to April 1, 2012. at Dortmund, Germany. The draw was held on February 22.

China once again won the final, beating Germany 3–0.

== Medalists ==
Event	Gold	Silver	Bronze
Team	China; Ma Long; Zhang Jike; Wang Hao; Xu Xin; Ma Lin	Germany; Timo Boll; Dimitrij Ovtcharov; Patrick Baum; Bastian Steger; Christian Süß	South Korea; Joo Se-Hyuk; Ryu Seung-Min; Oh Sang-Eun; Kim Min-Seok; Jung Young-Sik
Team	China; Ma Long; Zhang Jike; Wang Hao; Xu Xin; Ma Lin	Germany; Timo Boll; Dimitrij Ovtcharov; Patrick Baum; Bastian Steger; Christian Süß	Japan; Jun Mizutani; Seiya Kishikawa; Koki Niwa; Kenji Matsudaira; Maharu Yoshimura

== Championship division ==
=== Players list ===
Team	Ranking	Group	Players
China	1	A	Ma Long · Zhang Jike · Wang Hao · Xu Xin · Ma Lin
Germany	2	B	Timo Boll · Dimitrij Ovtcharov · Patrick Baum · Bastian Steger · Christian Süß
South Korea	3	C	Joo Se-Hyuk · Ryu Seung-Min · Oh Sang-Eun · Kim Min-Seok · Jung Young-Sik
Japan	4	D	Jun Mizutani · Seiya Kishikawa · Koki Niwa · Kenji Matsudaira · Maharu Yoshimura
Russia	5	D	Alexey Smirnov · Kirill Skachkov · Alexander Shibaev · Igor Rubtsov · Fedor Kuzmin
Austria	6	C	Chen Weixing · Werner Schlager · Robert Gardos · Daniel Habesohn · Stefan Fegerl
Hong Kong	6	A	Jiang Tianyi · Leung Chu Yan · Tang Peng · Cheung Yuk · Li Ching
Portugal	8	B	Marcos Freitas · Joao Monteiro · Enio Mendes · Andre Silva
Singapore	9	B	Gao Ning · Yang Zi · Pang Xue Jie · Chew Zhe Yu Clarence
Sweden	10	A	Pär Gerell · Jörgen Persson · Jens Lundqvist · Robert Svensson · Kristian Karlsson
Croatia	11	D	Zoran Primorac · Andrej Gaćina · Tomislav Zubčić · Tomislav Kolarek · Frane Kojić
France	12	C	Simon Gauzy · Emmanuel Lebesson · Quentin Robinot · Tristan Flore
Chinese Taipei	13	C	Chuang Chih-yuan · Chen Chien-an · Wu Chih-chi · Chiang Hung-chieh · Lee Chia-sheng
Belarus	14	D	Vladimir Samsonov · Evgueni Chtchetinine · Pavel Platonov · Aleksandr Kuchuk · Kiryl Barabanov
Czech Republic	15	B	Petr Korbel · Dmitrij Prokopcov · Lubomir Jančárik · Antonin Gavlas · Michal Obeslo
Greece	16	A	Panagiotis Gionis · Kalinikos Kreanga · Konstantinos Papageorgiou · Konstantinos Lagogiannis
North Korea	17	A	Jang Song-Man · Kim Hyok-Bong · Kim Chol-Jin · Kim Song-Nam
Spain	18	B	He Zhi Wen · Carlos Machado · Alfredo Carneros · Jesus Cantero · Marc Duran
Poland	19	D	Wang Zengyi · Bartosz Such · Daniel Gorak · Jakub Kosowski · Robert Floras
Denmark	20	C	Allan Bentsen · Jonathan Groth · Kasper Sternberg · Mikkel Hindersson
Slovakia	21	D	Thomas Keinath · Lubomir Pistej · Peter Sereda · Michal Bardon
Hungary	23	C	János Jakab · Adam Pattantyus · Daniel Zwickl · Daniel Kosiba
Serbia	24	B	Aleksandar Karakašević · Žolt Pete · Marko Jevtović · Dragan Subotić
Slovenia	29	A	Sas Lasan · Mitja Horvat · Jan Zibrat · Ludvik Persolja

=== Preliminary round ===
==== Group A ====
Team	Pld	W	L	GW	GL	Pts
China	5	5	0	15	0	10
Hong Kong	5	4	1	12	3	9
Sweden	5	2	3	7	11	7
North Korea	5	2	3	7	10	7
Greece	5	2	3	6	10	7
Slovenia	5	0	5	2	15	5

25 March 2012; 20:00	Report	China	3–0	Greece	Westfalenhallen, Dortmund
Score by game:
Zhang Jike	3–0	Konstantinos Papageorgiou
Wang Hao	3–0	Kalinikos Kreanga
Ma Long	3–0	Panagiotis Gionis

25 March 2012; 20:00	Report	Hong Kong	3–0	Slovenia	Westfalenhallen, Dortmund
Score by game:
Tang Peng	3–0	Mitja Horvat
Jiang Tianyi	3–0	Jan Zibrat
Leung Chu Yan	3–0	Sas Lasan

25 March 2012; 20:00	Report	North Korea	3–1	Sweden	Westfalenhallen, Dortmund
Score by game:
Jang Song-Man	3–0	Jörgen Persson
Kim Hyok-Bong	3–2	Pär Gerell
Kim Song-Nam	1–3	Jens Lundqvist
Jang Song-Man	3–2	Pär Gerell

26 March 2012; 16:00	Report	North Korea	0–3	China	Westfalenhallen, Dortmund
Score by game:
Jang Song-Man	0–3	Wang Hao
Kim Hyok-Bong	0–3	Zhang Jike
Kim Song-Nam	0–3	Xu Xin

26 March 2012; 16:00	Report	Hong Kong	3–0	Sweden	Westfalenhallen, Dortmund
Score by game:
Jiang Tianyi	3–2	Pär Gerell
Leung Chu Yan	3–2	Jens Lundqvist
Tang Peng	3–2	Jörgen Persson

26 March 2012; 16:00	Report	Slovenia	0–3	Greece	Westfalenhallen, Dortmund
Score by game:
Jan Zibrat	0–3	Kalinikos Kreanga
Mitja Horvat	0–3	Panagiotis Gionis
Sas Lasan	0–3	Konstantinos Lagogiannis

27 March 2012; 13:00	Report	China	3–0	Sweden	Westfalenhallen, Dortmund
Score by game:
Ma Lin	3–1	Jörgen Persson
Ma Long	3–0	Kristian Karlsson
Zhang Jike	3–1	Robert Svensson

27 March 2012; 13:00	Report	Hong Kong	3–0	Greece	Westfalenhallen, Dortmund
Score by game:
Jiang Tianyi	3–0	Kalinikos Kreanga
Li Ching	3–1	Panagiotis Gionis
Tang Peng	3–1	Konstantinos Papageorgiou

27 March 2012; 13:00	Report	North Korea	3–0	Slovenia	Westfalenhallen, Dortmund
Score by game:
Jang Song-Man	3–0	Mitja Horvat
Kim Hyok-Bong	3–1	Jan Zibrat
Kim Song-Nam	3–0	Ludvik Persolja

28 March 2012; 13:00	Report	China	3–0	Hong Kong	Westfalenhallen, Dortmund
Score by game:
Zhang Jike	3–0	Leung Chu Yan
Wang Hao	3–0	Li Ching
Ma Lin	3–2	Cheung Yuk

28 March 2012; 13:00	Report	Sweden	3–2	Slovenia	Westfalenhallen, Dortmund
28 March 2012; 13:00	Report	Score by game:			Westfalenhallen, Dortmund
28 March 2012; 13:00	Report	Pär Gerell	3–2	Sas Lasan	Westfalenhallen, Dortmund
Jörgen Persson			2–3	Jan Zibrat
Jens Lundqvist			3–0	Mitja Horvat
Pär Gerell			2–3	Jan Zibrat
Jörgen Persson			3–1	Sas Lasan
			–

28 March 2012; 13:00	Report	Greece	3–1	North Korea	Westfalenhallen, Dortmund
Score by game:
Panagiotis Gionis	2–3	Kim Hyok-Bong
Kalinikos Kreanga	3–0	Jang Song-Man
Konstantinos Papageorgiou	3–0	Kim Song-Nam
Panagiotis Gionis	3–2	Jang Song-Man

28 March 2012; 19:00	Report	China	3–0	Slovenia	Westfalenhallen, Dortmund
Score by game:
Ma Long	3–0	Sas Lasan
Ma Lin	3–0	Jan Zibrat
Xu Xin	3–0	Mitja Horvat

28 March 2012; 19:00	Report	Hong Kong	3–0	North Korea	Westfalenhallen, Dortmund
Score by game:
Jiang Tianyi	3–2	Kim Hyok-Bong
Leung Chu Yan	3–0	Jang Song-Man
Tang Peng	3–0	Kim Chol-Jin

28 March 2012; 19:00	Report	Sweden	3–0	Greece	Westfalenhallen, Dortmund
Score by game:
Jens Lundqvist	3–1	Kalinikos Kreanga
Pär Gerell	3–0	Panagiotis Gionis
Jörgen Persson	3–1	Konstantinos Papageorgiou

==== Group B ====
Team	Pld	W	L	GW	GL	Pts
Germany	5	5	0	15	0	10
Portugal	5	3	2	9	8	8
Singapore	5	3	2	11	11	8
Serbia	5	2	3	8	11	7
Spain	5	1	4	5	14	6
Czech Republic	5	1	4	8	12	6

25 March 2012; 13:00	Report	Czech Republic	0–3	Germany	Westfalenhallen, Dortmund
Score by game:
Dmitrij Prokopcov	0–3	Timo Boll
Antonin Gavlas	0–3	Dimitrij Ovtcharov
Petr Korbel	2–3	Patrick Baum

25 March 2012; 13:00	Report	Portugal	3–0	Serbia	Westfalenhallen, Dortmund
Score by game:
Marcos Freitas	3–1	Marko Jevtović
Joao Monteiro	3–1	Aleksandar Karakašević
Andre Silva	3–2	Žolt Pete

25 March 2012; 13:00	Report	Singapore	3–2	Spain	Westfalenhallen, Dortmund
25 March 2012; 13:00	Report	Score by game:			Westfalenhallen, Dortmund
25 March 2012; 13:00	Report	Gao Ning	3–1	He Zhi Wen	Westfalenhallen, Dortmund
Yang Zi			2–3	Carlos Machado
Pang Xue Jie			3–2	Jesus Cantero
Gao Ning			1–3	Carlos Machado
Yang Zi			3–2	He Zhi Wen
			–

25 March 2012; 20:00	Report	Spain	0–3	Germany	Westfalenhallen, Dortmund
Score by game:
Carlos Machado	0–3	Timo Boll
Marc Duran	0–3	Dimitrij Ovtcharov
Alfredo Carneros	1–3	Bastian Steger

25 March 2012; 20:00	Report	Portugal	3–2	Singapore	Westfalenhallen, Dortmund
25 March 2012; 20:00	Report	Score by game:			Westfalenhallen, Dortmund
25 March 2012; 20:00	Report	Marcos Freitas	3–0	Pang Xue Jie	Westfalenhallen, Dortmund
Joao Monteiro			2–3	Gao Ning
Andre Silva			0–3	Yang Zi
Marcos Freitas			3–1	Gao Ning
Joao Monteiro			3–0	Pang Xue Jie
			–

25 March 2012; 20:00	Report	Czech Republic	2–3	Serbia	Westfalenhallen, Dortmund
25 March 2012; 20:00	Report	Score by game:			Westfalenhallen, Dortmund
25 March 2012; 20:00	Report	Dmitrij Prokopcov	1–3	Aleksandar Karakašević	Westfalenhallen, Dortmund
Petr Korbel			3–0	Žolt Pete
Lubomir Jančárik			1–3	Marko Jevtović
Dmitrij Prokopcov			3–1	Žolt Pete
Petr Korbel			1–3	Aleksandar Karakašević
			–

26 March 2012; 19:00	Report	Germany	3–0	Singapore	Westfalenhallen, Dortmund
Score by game:
Dimitrij Ovtcharov	3–1	Gao Ning
Timo Boll	3–0	Yang Zi
Patrick Baum	3–1	Pang Xue Jie

26 March 2012; 19:00	Report	Portugal	0–3	Czech Republic	Westfalenhallen, Dortmund
Score by game:
Joao Monteiro	1–3	Petr Korbel
Marcos Freitas	2–3	Dmitrij Prokopcov
Andre Silva	0–3	Michal Obeslo

26 March 2012; 19:00	Report	Spain	0–3	Serbia	Westfalenhallen, Dortmund
Score by game:
He Zhi Wen	2–3	Aleksandar Karakašević
Carlos Machado	1–3	Žolt Pete
Jesus Cantero	2–3	Marko Jevtović

27 March 2012; 19:00	Report	Germany	3–0	Portugal	Westfalenhallen, Dortmund
Score by game:
Dimitrij Ovtcharov	3–1	Marcos Freitas
Timo Boll	3–1	Joao Monteiro
Bastian Steger	3–1	Enio Mendes

27 March 2012; 19:00	Report	Singapore	3–2	Serbia	Westfalenhallen, Dortmund
27 March 2012; 19:00	Report	Score by game:			Westfalenhallen, Dortmund
27 March 2012; 19:00	Report	Yang Zi	1–3	Aleksandar Karakašević	Westfalenhallen, Dortmund
Gao Ning			3–0	Žolt Pete
Pang Xue Jie			1–3	Marko Jevtović
Gao Ning			3–0	Aleksandar Karakašević
Yang Zi			3–0	Žolt Pete
			–

27 March 2012; 19:00	Report	Czech Republic	2–3	Spain	Westfalenhallen, Dortmund
27 March 2012; 19:00	Report	Score by game:			Westfalenhallen, Dortmund
27 March 2012; 19:00	Report	Petr Korbel	3–0	Carlos Machado	Westfalenhallen, Dortmund
Dmitrij Prokopcov			3–0	Alfredo Carneros
Antonin Gavlas			2–3	He Zhi Wen
Petr Korbel			2–3	Alfredo Carneros
Dmitrij Prokopcov			2–3	Carlos Machado
			–

28 March 2012; 16:00	Report	Germany	3–0	Serbia	Westfalenhallen, Dortmund
Score by game:
Christian Süß	3–1	Marko Jevtović
Bastian Steger	3–1	Aleksandar Karakašević
Patrick Baum	3–2	Žolt Pete

28 March 2012; 16:00	Report	Spain	0–3	Portugal	Westfalenhallen, Dortmund
Score by game:
He Zhi Wen	0–3	Joao Monteiro
Carlos Machado	0–3	Marcos Freitas
Alfredo Carneros	1–3	Andre Silva

28 March 2012; 16:00	Report	Singapore	3–1	Czech Republic	Westfalenhallen, Dortmund
Score by game:
Gao Ning	3–0	Dmitrij Prokopcov
Yang Zi	3–0	Petr Korbel
Pang Xue Jie	0–3	Michal Obeslo
Gao Ning	3–0	Petr Korbel

==== Group C ====
Team	Pld	W	L	GW	GL	Pts
South Korea	5	5	0	15	4	10
Austria	5	4	1	13	5	9
Chinese Taipei	5	3	2	12	9	8
France	5	2	3	7	10	7
Hungary	5	1	4	6	14	6
Denmark	5	0	5	4	15	5

25 March 2012; 20:00	Report	South Korea	3–2	Chinese Taipei	Westfalenhallen, Dortmund
25 March 2012; 20:00	Report	Score by game:			Westfalenhallen, Dortmund
25 March 2012; 20:00	Report	Oh Sang-Eun	1–3	Chen Chien-an	Westfalenhallen, Dortmund
Joo Se-Hyuk			0–3	Chuang Chih-yuan
Ryu Seung-Min			3–0	Chiang Hung-chieh
Oh Sang-Eun			3–2	Chuang Chih-yuan
Joo Se-Hyuk			3–2	Chen Chien-an
			–

25 March 2012; 20:00	Report	Austria	3–0	Hungary	Westfalenhallen, Dortmund
Score by game:
Robert Gardos	3–0	Daniel Zwickl
Daniel Habesohn	3–1	Daniel Kosiba
Chen Weixing	3–1	János Jakab

25 March 2012; 20:00	Report	Denmark	0–3	France	Westfalenhallen, Dortmund
Score by game:
Allan Bentsen	1–3	Emmanuel Lebesson
Jonathan Groth	0–3	Simon Gauzy
Kasper Sternberg	0–3	Tristan Flore

26 March 2012; 19:00	Report	South Korea	3–0	Denmark	Westfalenhallen, Dortmund
Score by game:
Kim Min-Seok	3–2	Kasper Sternberg
Joo Se-Hyuk	3–0	Mikkel Hindersson
Oh Sang-Eun	3–0	Jonathan Groth

26 March 2012; 19:00	Report	Austria	3–0	France	Westfalenhallen, Dortmund
Score by game:
Robert Gardos	3–1	Simon Gauzy
Stefan Fegerl	3–0	Emmanuel Lebesson
Chen Weixing	3–1	Tristan Flore

26 March 2012; 19:00	Report	Chinese Taipei	3–1	Hungary	Westfalenhallen, Dortmund
Score by game:
Chuang Chih-yuan	0–3	Adam Pattantyus
Chen Chien-an	3–0	Daniel Kosiba
Wu Chih-chi	3–2	Daniel Zwickl
Chuang Chih-yuan	3–1	Daniel Kosiba

27 March 2012; 19:00	Report	South Korea	3–0	France	Westfalenhallen, Dortmund
Score by game:
Oh Sang-Eun	3–1	Simon Gauzy
Joo Se-Hyuk	3–1	Quentin Robinot
Ryu Seung-Min	3–0	Tristan Flore

27 March 2012; 19:00	Report	Austria	3–1	Chinese Taipei	Westfalenhallen, Dortmund
Score by game:
Stefan Fegerl	0–3	Chuang Chih-yuan
Robert Gardos	3–2	Chen Chien-an
Chen Weixing	3–1	Chiang Hung-chieh
Robert Gardos	3–0	Chuang Chih-yuan

27 March 2012; 19:00	Report	Denmark	2–3	Hungary	Westfalenhallen, Dortmund
27 March 2012; 19:00	Report	Score by game:			Westfalenhallen, Dortmund
27 March 2012; 19:00	Report	Allan Bentsen	3–1	Adam Pattantyus	Westfalenhallen, Dortmund
Jonathan Groth			0–3	Daniel Kosiba
Kasper Sternberg			0–3	János Jakab
Allan Bentsen			3–2	Daniel Kosiba
Jonathan Groth			1–3	Adam Pattantyus
			–

28 March 2012; 13:00	Report	South Korea	3–1	Austria	Westfalenhallen, Dortmund
Score by game:
Joo Se-Hyuk	0–3	Daniel Habesohn
Oh Sang-Eun	3–0	Robert Gardos
Ryu Seung-Min	3–0	Stefan Fegerl
Joo Se-Hyuk	3–0	Robert Gardos

28 March 2012; 13:00	Report	France	3–1	Hungary	Westfalenhallen, Dortmund
Score by game:
Simon Gauzy	3–1	Daniel Zwickl
Emmanuel Lebesson	3–0	János Jakab
Quentin Robinot	2–3	Adam Pattantyus
Simon Gauzy	3–1	János Jakab

28 March 2012; 13:00	Report	Chinese Taipei	3–1	Denmark	Westfalenhallen, Dortmund
Score by game:
Chuang Chih-yuan	3–0	Kasper Sternberg
Chen Chien-an	3–2	Allan Bentsen
Wu Chih-chi	1–3	Mikkel Hindersson
Chuang Chih-yuan	3–0	Allan Bentsen

28 March 2012; 19:00	Report	South Korea	3–1	Hungary	Westfalenhallen, Dortmund
Score by game:
Jung Young-Sik	3–1	Adam Pattantyus
Kim Min-Seok	0–3	Daniel Kosiba
Ryu Seung-Min	3–0	Daniel Zwickl
Kim Min-Seok	3–0	Adam Pattantyus

28 March 2012; 19:00	Report	Austria	3–1	Denmark	Westfalenhallen, Dortmund
Score by game:
Daniel Habesohn	3–2	Kasper Sternberg
Stefan Fegerl	2–3	Mikkel Hindersson
Werner Schlager	3–0	Jonathan Groth
Daniel Habesohn	3–0	Mikkel Hindersson

28 March 2012; 19:00	Report	France	1–3	Chinese Taipei	Westfalenhallen, Dortmund
Score by game:
Emmanuel Lebesson	1–3	Chuang Chih-yuan
Simon Gauzy	2–3	Chen Chien-an
Quentin Robinot	3–1	Chiang Hung-chieh
Simon Gauzy	1–3	Chuang Chih-yuan

==== Group D ====
Team	Pld	W	L	GW	GL	Pts
Japan	5	4	1	16	4	9
Belarus	5	4	1	12	5	9
Poland	5	3	2	9	8	8
Russia	5	2	3	7	13	7
Croatia	5	2	3	9	9	7
Slovakia	5	0	5	4	15	5

25 March 2012; 13:00	Report	Belarus	0–3	Japan	Westfalenhallen, Dortmund
Score by game:
Vladimir Samsonov	1–3	Jun Mizutani
Evgueni Chtchetinine	2–3	Kenji Matsudaira
Pavel Platonov	0–3	Seiya Kishikawa

25 March 2012; 13:00	Report	Russia	3–2	Slovakia	Westfalenhallen, Dortmund
25 March 2012; 13:00	Report	Score by game:			Westfalenhallen, Dortmund
25 March 2012; 13:00	Report	Alexey Smirnov	3–1	Lubomir Pistej	Westfalenhallen, Dortmund
Kirill Skachkov			2–3	Thomas Keinath
Igor Rubtsov			3–2	Peter Sereda
Alexey Smirnov			2–3	Thomas Keinath
Kirill Skachkov			3–1	Lubomir Pistej
			–

25 March 2012; 13:00	Report	Croatia	3–0	Poland	Westfalenhallen, Dortmund
Score by game:
Andrej Gaćina	3–0	Bartosz Such
Zoran Primorac	3–2	Zeng Yi Wang
Tomislav Kolarek	3–0	Jakub Kosowski

26 March 2012; 10:00	Report	Japan	1–3	Poland	Westfalenhallen, Dortmund
Score by game:
Koki Niwa	3–0	Daniel Gorak
Seiya Kishikawa	2–3	Robert Floras
Maharu Yoshimura	2–3	Bartosz Such
Seiya Kishikawa	2–3	Daniel Gorak

26 March 2012; 10:00	Report	Russia	3–2	Croatia	Westfalenhallen, Dortmund
26 March 2012; 10:00	Report	Score by game:			Westfalenhallen, Dortmund
26 March 2012; 10:00	Report	Alexey Smirnov	1–3	Andrej Gaćina	Westfalenhallen, Dortmund
Kirill Skachkov			3–1	Zoran Primorac
Alexander Shibaev			2–3	Tomislav Kolarek
Alexey Smirnov			3–1	Zoran Primorac
Kirill Skachkov			3–1	Andrej Gaćina
			–

26 March 2012; 10:00	Report	Belarus	3–0	Slovakia	Westfalenhallen, Dortmund
Score by game:
Pavel Platonov	3–1	Lubomir Pistej
Vladimir Samsonov	3–0	Thomas Keinath
Evgueni Chtchetinine	3–1	Michal Bardon

27 March 2012; 13:00	Report	Japan	3–0	Croatia	Westfalenhallen, Dortmund
Score by game:
Koki Niwa	3–1	Andrej Gaćina
Jun Mizutani	3–0	Tomislav Zubčić
Kenji Matsudaira	3–2	Tomislav Kolarek

27 March 2012; 13:00	Report	Russia	1–3	Belarus	Westfalenhallen, Dortmund
Score by game:
Alexander Shibaev	1–3	Vladimir Samsonov
Alexey Smirnov	3–2	Pavel Platonov
Kirill Skachkov	2–3	Evgueni Chtchetinine
Alexey Smirnov	2–3	Vladimir Samsonov

27 March 2012; 13:00	Report	Poland	3–1	Slovakia	Westfalenhallen, Dortmund
Score by game:
Daniel Gorak	3–2	Lubomir Pistej
Zeng Yi Wang	2–3	Michal Bardon
Robert Floras	3–1	Peter Sereda
Zeng Yi Wang	3–1	Lubomir Pistej

28 March 2012; 13:00	Report	Japan	3–0	Russia	Westfalenhallen, Dortmund
Score by game:
Jun Mizutani	3–0	Alexander Shibaev
Koki Niwa	3–2	Alexey Smirnov
Kenji Matsudaira	3–2	Kirill Skachkov

28 March 2012; 13:00	Report	Croatia	3–0	Slovakia	Westfalenhallen, Dortmund
Score by game:
Tomislav Kolarek	3–1	Thomas Keinath
Andrej Gaćina	3–0	Michal Bardon
Tomislav Zubčić	3–2	Peter Sereda

28 March 2012; 13:00	Report	Belarus	3–0	Poland	Westfalenhallen, Dortmund
Score by game:
Evgueni Chtchetinine	3–0	Jakub Kosowski
Vladimir Samsonov	3–1	Zeng Yi Wang
Pavel Platonov	3–1	Daniel Gorak

28 March 2012; 19:00	Report	Japan	3–1	Slovakia	Westfalenhallen, Dortmund
Score by game:
Jun Mizutani	3–2	Peter Sereda
Koki Niwa	1–3	Thomas Keinath
Kenji Matsudaira	3–2	Michal Bardon
Jun Mizutani	3–0	Thomas Keinath

28 March 2012; 19:00	Report	Russia	0–3	Poland	Westfalenhallen, Dortmund
Score by game:
Alexey Smirnov	2–3	Robert Floras
Kirill Skachkov	2–3	Daniel Gorak
Igor Rubtsov	2–3	Bartosz Such

28 March 2012; 19:00	Report	Croatia	1–3	Belarus	Westfalenhallen, Dortmund
Score by game:
Andrej Gaćina	2–3	Evgueni Chtchetinine
Zoran Primorac	0–3	Vladimir Samsonov
Tomislav Kolarek	3–1	Pavel Platonov
Andrej Gaćina	0–3	Vladimir Samsonov

=== Knockout stage ===
==== Place 1–12 ====
Ninth place
Hong Kong	3
Belarus	1
Eleventh place
Poland	1
Portugal	3

Consolation semifinals
Poland	1
Hong Kong	3
Belarus	3
Portugal	1

First round
Poland	1
Austria	3
Hong Kong	2
Chinese Taipei	3
Singapore	3
Belarus	1
Portugal	0
Sweden	3

Quarterfinals
China	3
Austria	0
Chinese Taipei	1
South Korea	3
Japan	3
Singapore	1
Sweden	0
Germany	3

Semifinals
China	3
South Korea	0
Japan	1
Germany	3
5th–8th classification
Austria	3
Chinese Taipei	0
Singapore	1
Sweden	3

Final
China	3
Germany	0
Third place
South Korea	X
Japan	X
Fifth place
Austria	3
Sweden	1
Seventh place
Chinese Taipei	3
Singapore	2

===== First round =====
29 March 2012; 14:00	Report	Hong Kong	2–3	Chinese Taipei	Westfalenhallen, Dortmund
29 March 2012; 14:00	Report	Score by game:			Westfalenhallen, Dortmund
29 March 2012; 14:00	Report	Leung Chu Yan	2–3	Chuang Chih-yuan	Westfalenhallen, Dortmund
Jiang Tianyi			3–1	Chen Chien-an
Tang Peng			0–3	Wu Chih-chi
Jiang Tianyi			3–1	Chuang Chih-yuan
Leung Chu Yan			1–3	Chen Chien-an
			–

29 March 2012; 14:00	Report	Singapore	3–1	Belarus	Westfalenhallen, Dortmund
Score by game:
Pang Xue Jie	0–3	Vladimir Samsonov
Gao Ning	3–2	Evgueni Chtchetinine
Yang Zi	3–1	Pavel Platonov
Gao Ning	3–0	Vladimir Samsonov

29 March 2012; 20:00	Report	Poland	1–3	Austria	Westfalenhallen, Dortmund
Score by game:
Daniel Gorak	0–3	Chen Weixing
Bartosz Such	0–3	Robert Gardos
Robert Floras	3–1	Werner Schlager
Daniel Gorak	0–3	Robert Gardos

29 March 2012; 20:00	Report	Portugal	0–3	Sweden	Westfalenhallen, Dortmund
Score by game:
Joao Monteiro	1–3	Jens Lundqvist
Marcos Freitas	1–3	Pär Gerell
Andre Silva	1–3	Jörgen Persson

===== Quarterfinals =====
30 March 2012; 10:00	Report	Japan	3–1	Singapore	Westfalenhallen, Dortmund
Score by game:
Jun Mizutani	3–0	Pang Xue Jie
Koki Niwa	3–0	Gao Ning
Kenji Matsudaira	1–3	Yang Zi
Jun Mizutani	3–2	Gao Ning

30 March 2012; 16:00	Report	China	3–0	Austria	Westfalenhallen, Dortmund
Score by game:
Zhang Jike	3–0	Chen Weixing
Ma Lin	3–1	Robert Gardos
Ma Long	3–0	Daniel Habesohn

30 March 2012; 16:00	Report	Germany	3–0	Sweden	Westfalenhallen, Dortmund
Score by game:
Dimitrij Ovtcharov	3–0	Jörgen Persson
Timo Boll	3–1	Jens Lundqvist
Patrick Baum	3–0	Pär Gerell

30 March 2012; 19:00	Report	South Korea	3–1	Chinese Taipei	Westfalenhallen, Dortmund
Score by game:
Joo Se-Hyuk	0–3	Chuang Chih-yuan
Oh Sang-Eun	3–0	Chen Chien-an
Ryu Seung-Min	3–0	Wu Chih-chi
Joo Se-Hyuk	3–0	Chen Chien-an

===== Semifinals =====
31 March 2012; 13:00	Report	Japan	1–3	Germany	Westfalenhallen, Dortmund
Score by game:
Jun Mizutani	0–3	Dimitrij Ovtcharov
Koki Niwa	0–3	Timo Boll
Seiya Kishikawa	3–1	Patrick Baum
Jun Mizutani	0–3	Timo Boll

31 March 2012; 19:00	Report	China	3–0	South Korea	Westfalenhallen, Dortmund
Score by game:
Ma Long	3–0	Oh Sang-Eun
Wang Hao	3–1	Ryu Seung-Min
Zhang Jike	3–1	Kim Min-Seok

===== Final =====
1 April 2012; 13:30	Report	China	3–0	Germany	Westfalenhallen, Dortmund
Score by game:
Zhang Jike	3–2	Timo Boll
Ma Long	3–0	Dimitrij Ovtcharov
Wang Hao	3–1	Patrick Baum

==== Place 13–24 bracket ====
Position 21–22
Croatia	1
Spain	3
Position 23–24
Czech Republic	3
Slovenia	0

Position 21–24
Croatia	3
Czech Republic	2
Spain	3
Slovenia	2

First Round
Denmark	3
Croatia	2
Greece	3
Czech Republic	2
Slovakia	3
Spain	1
Hungary	3
Slovenia	2

Second Round
North Korea	3
Denmark	1
Greece	3
France	1
Serbia	3
Slovakia	1
Hungary	0
Russia	3

Third Round
North Korea	3
Greece	2
Serbia	1
Russia	3
Position 17–20
Denmark	2
France	3
Slovakia	1
Hungary	3

Position 13–14
North Korea	3
Russia	2
Position 15–16
Greece	3
Serbia	1
Position 17–18
France	1
Hungary	3
Position 19–20
Denmark	0
Slovakia	3

== Second Division ==
=== Preliminary round ===
==== Group E ====
Team	Pld	W	L	GW	GL	Pts
Romania	5	5	0	15	2	10
India	5	4	1	13	4	9
Nigeria	5	3	2	10	7	8
Norway	5	2	3	6	10	7
Canada	5	1	4	6	14	6
Finland	5	0	5	2	15	5

	CAN	FIN	IND	NGR	NOR	ROU
Canada		3–2	1–3	1–3	1–3	0–3
Finland	2–3		0–3	0–3	0–3	0–3
India	3–1	3–0		3–0	3–0	1–3
Nigeria	3–1	3–0	0–3		3–0	1–3
Norway	3–1	3–0	0–3	0–3		0–3
Romania	3–0	3–0	3–1	3–1	3–0	

==== Group F ====
Team	Pld	W	L	GW	GL	Pts
Brazil	5	5	0	15	3	10
Italy	5	3	2	11	8	8
Iran	5	3	2	12	6	8
Bosnia and Herzegovina	5	2	3	7	11	7
Scotland	5	1	4	5	12	6
Netherlands	5	1	4	3	13	6

	BIH	BRA	IRI	ITA	NED	SCO
Bosnia and Herzegovina		0–3	0–3	3–1	1–3	3–1
Brazil	3–0		3–2	3–1	3–0	3–0
Iran	3–0	2–3		1–3	3–0	3–0
Italy	1–3	1–3	3–1		3–0	3–1
Netherlands	3–1	0–3	0–3	0–3		0–3
Scotland	1–3	0–3	0–3	1–3	3–0	

==== Group G ====
Team	Pld	W	L	GW	GL	Pts
Ukraine	5	5	0	15	2	10
Bulgaria	5	3	2	9	12	8
Belgium	5	3	2	11	8	8
Turkey	5	2	3	12	10	7
Israel	5	1	4	6	13	6
Luxembourg	5	1	4	4	12	6

	BEL	BUL	ISR	LUX	TUR	UKR
Belgium		2–3	3–0	3–0	3–2	0–3
Bulgaria	3–2		3–2	0–3	3–2	0–3
Israel	0–3	2–3		3–1	1–3	0–3
Luxembourg	0–3	3–0	1–3		0–3	0–3
Turkey	2–3	2–3	3–1	3–0		2–3
Ukraine	3–0	3–0	3–0	3–0	3–2	

==== Group H ====
Team	Pld	W	L	GW	GL	Pts
England	5	5	0	15	1	10
Egypt	5	4	1	13	6	9
Australia	5	3	2	10	8	8
Cuba	5	2	3	6	12	7
Argentina	5	1	4	7	12	6
Venezuela	5	0	5	3	15	5

	ARG	AUS	CUB	EGY	ENG	VEN
Argentina		1–3	2–3	1–3	0–3	3–0
Australia	3–1		3–0	1–3	0–3	3–1
Cuba	3–2	0–3		0–3	0–3	3–1
Egypt	3–1	3–1	3–0		1–3	3–1
England	3–0	3–0	3–0	3–1		3–0
Venezuela	0–3	1–3	1–3	1–3	0–3	

=== Knockout stage ===
==== Place 25–36 bracket ====
First Round
Australia	2
Italy	3
India	3
Iran	1
Belgium	0
Egypt	3
Bulgaria	2
Nigeria	3
Position 33–36
Australia	0
Iran	3
Belgium	3
Bulgaria	2

Second Round
Romania	3
Italy	2
India	3
England	1
Ukraine	3
Egypt	2
Nigeria	1
Brazil	3
Position 33–36
Iran	3
Belgium	0
Australia	3
Bulgaria	1

Third Round
Romania	3
India	2
Ukraine	3
Brazil	1
Position 29–32
Italy	1
England	3
Egypt	3
Nigeria	0

Position 25–26
Romania	1
Ukraine	3
Position 27–28
India	3
Brazil	2
Position 29–32
England	3
Egypt	0
Italy	3
Nigeria	0

==== Place 37–48 bracket ====
First Round
Venezuela	2
Scotland	3
Israel	3
Finland	2
Luxembourg	1
Canada	3
Argentina	3
Netherlands	0
Position 45–48
Venezuela	1
Finland	3
Luxembourg	3
Netherlands	1

Second Round
Norway	3
Scotland	1
Israel	3
Bosnia and Herzegovina	0
Cuba	3
Canada	2
Argentina	0
Turkey	3
Position 45–48
Finland	3
Luxembourg	0
Venezuela	1
Netherlands	3

Third Round
Norway	1
Israel	3
Cuba	2
Turkey	3
Position 41–44
Scotland	2
Bosnia and Herzegovina	3
Canada	2
Argentina	3

Position 37–38
Israel	1
Turkey	3
Position 39–40
Norway	1
Cuba	3
Position 41–44
Bosnia and Herzegovina	2
Argentina	3
Scotland	0
Canada	3

== Third Division ==
=== Preliminary round ===
==== Group I ====
Team	Pld	W	L	GW	GL	Pts
Latvia	5	5	0	15	2	10
Chile	5	4	1	13	7	9
Cyprus	5	3	2	11	7	8
Moldova	5	2	3	7	11	7
Ireland	5	1	4	8	12	6
San Marino	5	0	5	0	15	5

	CHI	CYP	IRL	LAT	MDA	SMR
Chile		3–2	3–1	1–3	3–1	3–0
Cyprus	2–3		3–1	0–3	3–0	3–0
Ireland	1–3	1–3		1–3	2–3	3–0
Latvia	3–1	3–0	3–1		3–0	3–0
Moldova	1–3	0–3	3–2	0–3		3–0
San Marino	0–3	0–3	0–3	0–3	0–3	

==== Group J ====
Team	Pld	W	L	GW	GL	Pts
Lithuania	5	5	0	15	2	10
United States	5	3	2	12	6	8
Malaysia	5	3	2	10	8	8
Ecuador	5	2	3	8	11	7
Qatar	5	1	4	3	13	6
Montenegro	5	1	4	6	14	6

	ECU	LTU	MAS	MNE	QAT	USA
Ecuador		0–3	0–3	2–3	3–0	3–2
Lithuania	3–0		3–1	3–0	3–0	3–1
Malaysia	3–0	1–3		3–2	3–0	0–3
Montenegro	3–2	0–3	2–3		1–3	0–3
Qatar	0–3	0–3	0–3	3–1		0–3
United States	2–3	1–3	3–0	3–0	3–0	

==== Group K ====
Team	Pld	W	L	GW	GL	Pts
Paraguay	5	4	1	13	8	9
Switzerland	5	4	1	13	8	9
Thailand	5	3	2	13	9	8
Colombia	5	2	3	9	12	7
Saudi Arabia	5	1	4	6	13	6
Congo	5	1	4	9	13	6

	COL	CGO	PAR	KSA	SUI	THA
Colombia		3–2	1–3	3–1	1–3	1–3
Congo	2–3		3–1	1–3	1–3	2–3
Paraguay	3–1	1–3		3–1	3–1	3–2
Saudi Arabia	1–3	3–1	1–3		1–3	0–3
Switzerland	3–1	3–1	1–3	3–1		3–2
Thailand	3–1	3–2	2–3	3–0	2–3	

==== Group L ====
Team	Pld	W	L	GW	GL	Pts
Dominican Republic	5	4	1	13	9	9
Estonia	5	4	1	14	6	9
Lebanon	5	3	2	11	10	8
United Arab Emirates	5	2	3	9	13	7
Mexico	5	1	4	10	12	6
South Africa	5	1	4	6	13	6

	DOM	EST	LIB	MEX	RSA	UAE
Dominican Republic		3–2	3–1	3–1	1–3	3–2
Estonia	2–3		3–1	3–2	3–0	3–0
Lebanon	1–3	1–3		3–2	3–1	3–1
Mexico	1–3	2–3	2–3		3–0	2–3
South Africa	3–1	0–3	1–3	0–3		2–3
United Arab Emirates	2–3	0–3	1–3	3–2	3–2	

=== Knockout stage ===
==== Place 49–60 bracket ====
First Round
Lebanon	1
Switzerland	3
Estonia	2
Malaysia	3
Cyprus	0
United States	3
Chile	2
Thailand	3
Position 57–60
Lebanon	2
Estonia	3
Cyprus	3
Chile	1

Second Round
Latvia	2
Switzerland	3
Malaysia	1
Paraguay	3
Dominican Republic	3
United States	0
Thailand	0
Lithuania	3
Position 57–60
Estonia	1
Cyprus	3
Lebanon	0
Chile	3

Third Round
Switzerland	2
Paraguay	3
Dominican Republic	3
Lithuania	2
Position 53–56
Latvia	3
Malaysia	1
United States	3
Thailand	0

Position 49–50
Paraguay	3
Dominican Republic	1
Position 51–52
Switzerland	1
Lithuania	3
Position 53–56
Latvia	1
United States	3
Malaysia	0
Thailand	3

==== Place 61–72 bracket ====
First Round
Congo	1
Qatar	3
Ireland	3
South Africa	1
Montenegro	1
Saudi Arabia	3
Mexico	3
San Marino	0
Position 69–72
Congo	2
South Africa	3
Montenegro	3
San Marino	1

Second Round
United Arab Emirates	2
Qatar	3
Ireland	2
Colombia	3
Moldova	1
Saudi Arabia	3
Mexico	3
Ecuador	1
Position 69–72
South Africa	2
Montenegro	3
Congo	3
San Marino	0

Third Round
Qatar	0
Colombia	3
Saudi Arabia	2
Mexico	3
Position 65–68
United Arab Emirates	2
Ireland	3
Moldova	3
Ecuador	2

Position 61–62
Colombia	0
Mexico	3
Position 63–64
Qatar	1
Saudi Arabia	3
Position 65–68
Ireland	3
Moldova	2
United Arab Emirates	2
Ecuador	3

== Fourth Division ==
=== Preliminary round ===
==== Group M ====
Team	Pld	W	L	GW	GL	Pts
Puerto Rico	5	5	0	15	1	10
Macau	5	3	2	11	7	8
Morocco	5	3	2	10	7	8
Syria	5	2	3	7	10	7
Pakistan	5	2	3	8	11	7
Malta	5	0	5	0	15	5

	MAC	MLT	MAR	PAK	PUR	SYR
Macau		3–0	3–0	2–3	0–3	3–1
Malta	0–3		0–3	0–3	0–3	0–3
Morocco	0–3	3–0		3–1	1–3	3–0
Pakistan	3–2	3–0	1–3		0–3	1–3
Puerto Rico	3–0	3–0	3–1	3–0		3–0
Syria	1–3	3–0	0–3	3–1	0–3	

==== Group N ====
Team	Pld	W	L	GW	GL	Pts
Kazakhstan	5	5	0	15	1	10
Armenia	5	3	2	11	7	8
New Zealand	5	3	2	11	12	8
Yemen	5	3	2	11	9	8
Azerbaijan	5	1	4	6	14	6
Nicaragua	5	0	5	4	15	5

	ARM	AZE	KAZ	NZL	NCA	YEM
Armenia		3–0	0–3	2–3	3–0	3–1
Azerbaijan	0–3		0–3	2–3	3–2	1–3
Kazakhstan	3–0	3–0		3–0	3–0	3–1
New Zealand	3–2	3–2	0–3		3–2	2–3
Nicaragua	0–3	2–3	0–3	2–3		0–3
Yemen	1–3	3–1	1–3	3–2	3–0	

==== Group O ====
Team	Pld	W	L	GW	GL	Pts
Guatemala	5	5	0	15	2	10
Peru	5	3	2	12	9	8
Macedonia	5	3	2	11	9	8
Costa Rica	5	2	3	8	12	7
Congo DR	5	2	3	8	11	7
Laos	5	0	5	4	15	5

	COD	CRC	GUA	LAO	MKD	PER
Congo DR		1–3	0–3	3–0	1–3	3–2
Costa Rica	3–1		0–3	3–2	1–3	1–3
Guatemala	3–0	3–0		3–1	3–0	3–1
Laos	0–3	2–3	1–3		1–3	0–3
Macedonia	3–1	3–1	0–3	3–1		2–3
Peru	2–3	3–1	1–3	3–0	3–2	

==== Group P ====
Team	Pld	W	L	GW	GL	Pts
Wales	5	5	0	15	3	10
Uzbekistan	5	4	1	13	6	9
Bahrain	5	3	2	10	10	8
Kuwait	5	2	3	12	10	7
Kosovo	5	1	4	6	13	6
Cameroon	5	0	5	1	15	5

	BRN	CMR	KOS	KUW	UZB	WAL
Bahrain		3–0	3–2	3–2	1–3	0–3
Cameroon	0–3		1–3	0–3	0–3	0–3
Kosovo	2–3	3–1		1–3	0–3	0–3
Kuwait	2–3	3–0	3–1		2–3	2–3
Uzbekistan	3–1	3–0	3–0	3–2		1–3
Wales	3–0	3–0	3–0	3–2	3–1	

=== Knockout stage ===
==== Place 73–84 bracket ====
First Round
Macedonia	0
Uzbekistan	3
Armenia	1
Morocco	3
New Zealand	3
Peru	2
Macau	3
Bahrain	2
Position 81–84
Macedonia	0
Armenia	3
Peru	3
Bahrain	1

Second Round
Puerto Rico	1
Uzbekistan	3
Morocco	2
Guatemala	3
Wales	3
New Zealand	2
Macau	2
Kazakhstan	3
Position 81–84
Armenia	1
Peru	3
Macedonia	3
Bahrain	1

Third Round
Uzbekistan	1
Guatemala	3
Wales	2
Kazakhstan	3
Position 77–80
Puerto Rico	3
Morocco	2
New Zealand	0
Macau	3

Position 73–74
Guatemala	0
Kazakhstan	3
Position 75–76
Uzbekistan	3
Wales	2
Position 77–80
Puerto Rico	3
Macau	1
Morocco	0
New Zealand	3

==== Place 85–96 bracket ====
First Round
Malta	0
Kosovo	3
Azerbaijan	3
Laos	1
Nicaragua	2
Congo DR	3
Pakistan	3
Cameroon	0
Position 93–96
Malta	0
Laos	3
Nicaragua	3
Cameroon	0

Second Round
Costa Rica	3
Kosovo	1
Azerbaijan	0
Kuwait	3
Syria	3
Congo DR	1
Pakistan	2
Yemen	3
Position 93–96
Laos	1
Nicaragua	3
Malta	1
Cameroon	3

Third Round
Costa Rica	1
Kuwait	3
Syria	3
Yemen	1
Position 89–92
Kosovo	2
Azerbaijan	3
Congo DR	0
Pakistan	3

Position 85–86
Kuwait	2
Syria	3
Position 87–88
Costa Rica	0
Yemen	3
Position 89–92
Azerbaijan	1
Pakistan	3
Kosovo	3
Congo DR	0

== Fifth Division ==
=== Preliminary round ===
==== Group Q ====
Team	Pld	W	L	GW	GL	Pts
Sri Lanka	5	5	0	15	2	10
Guernsey	5	4	1	14	3	9
Turkmenistan	5	3	2	9	6	8
Tanzania	5	2	3	6	10	6
Zimbabwe	5	1	4	4	12	6
Namibia	5	0	5	0	15	5

	GGY	NAM	SRI	TAN	TKM	ZIM
Guernsey		3–0	2–3	3–0	3–0	3–0
Namibia	0–3		0–3	0–3	0–3	0–3
Sri Lanka	3–2	3–0		3–0	3–0	3–0
Tanzania	0–3	3–0	0–3		0–3	3–1
Turkmenistan	0–3	3–0	0–3	3–0		3–0
Zimbabwe	0–3	3–0	0–3	1–3	0–3	

==== Group R ====
Team	Pld	W	L	GW	GL	Pts
Jamaica	5	5	0	15	1	10
Tajikistan	5	4	1	13	4	9
Palestine	5	3	2	10	8	8
Uganda	5	2	3	7	10	7
Isle of Man	5	1	4	5	12	6
Sierra Leone	5	0	5	0	15	0

	IMN	JAM	PLE	SLE	TJK	UGA
Isle of Man		0–3	1–3	3–0	0–3	1–3
Jamaica	3–0		3–0	3–0	3–1	3–0
Palestine	3–1	0–3		3–0	1–3	3–1
Sierra Leone	0–3	0–3	0–3		0–3	0–3
Tajikistan	3–0	1–3	3–1	3–0		3–0
Uganda	3–1	0–3	1–3	3–0	0–3	

==== Group S ====
Team	Pld	W	L	GW	GL	Pts
Mongolia	5	5	0	15	3	10
Trinidad and Tobago	5	4	1	14	4	9
Kyrgyzstan	5	3	2	11	6	8
Curaçao	5	2	3	6	11	7
Faroe Islands	5	1	4	5	12	6
Liberia	5	0	5	0	15	0

	CUW	FRO	KGZ	LBR	MGL	TRI
Curaçao		3–2	0–3	3–0	0–3	0–3
Faroe Islands	2–3		0–3	3–0	0–3	0–3
Kyrgyzstan	3–0	3–0		3–0	1–3	1–3
Liberia	0–3	0–3	0–3		0–3	0–3
Mongolia	3–0	3–0	3–1	3–0		3–2
Trinidad and Tobago	3–0	3–0	3–1	3–0	2–3	

==== Group T ====
Team	Pld	W	L	GW	GL	Pts
Barbados	5	5	0	15	6	10
Togo	5	4	1	14	3	9
Iceland	5	3	2	11	7	8
Panama	5	2	3	8	9	7
Nepal	5	1	4	4	13	6
Zambia	5	0	5	1	15	5

	BAR	ISL	NEP	PAN	TOG	ZAM
Barbados		3–2	3–1	3–1	3–2	3–0
Iceland	2–3		3–0	3–1	0–3	3–0
Nepal	1–3	0–3		0–3	0–3	3–1
Panama	1–3	1–3	3–0		0–3	3–0
Togo	2–3	3–0	3–0	3–0		3–0
Zambia	0–3	0–3	1–3	0–3	0–3	

=== Knockout stage ===
==== Place 97–108 bracket ====
First Round
Palestine	0
Togo	3
Trinidad and Tobago	3
Turkmenistan	2
Kyrgyzstan	1
Guernsey	3
Tajikistan	0
Iceland	3
Position 105–108
Palestine	1
Turkmenistan	3
Kyrgyzstan	1
Tajikistan	3

Second Round
Sri Lanka	3
Togo	2
Trinidad and Tobago	3
Barbados	0
Jamaica	3
Guernsey	2
Iceland	1
Mongolia	3
Position 105–108
Turkmenistan	0
Tajikistan	3
Palestine	0
Kyrgyzstan	3

Third Round
Sri Lanka	3
Trinidad and Tobago	2
Jamaica	0
Mongolia	3
Position 101–104
Togo	3
Barbados	1
Guernsey	3
Iceland	2

Position 97–98
Sri Lanka	2
Mongolia	3
Position 99–100
Trinidad and Tobago	3
Jamaica	2
Position 101–104
Togo	0
Guernsey	3
Barbados	3
Iceland	0

==== Place 109–120 bracket ====
First Round
Nepal	3
Zimbabwe	0
Faroe Islands	3
Namibia	0
Liberia	0
Isle of Man	3
Zambia	3
Sierra Leone	0
Position 117–120
Zimbabwe	3
Namibia	1
Liberia	X
Sierra Leone	X

Second Round
Uganda	0
Nepal	3
Faroe Islands	1
Panama	3
Tanzania	1
Isle of Man	3
Zambia	1
Curaçao	3
Position 117–120
Zimbabwe
Bye
Namibia
Bye

Third Round
Nepal	2
Panama	3
Isle of Man	2
Curaçao	3
Position 113–116
Uganda	3
Faroe Islands	1
Tanzania	3
Zambia	2

Position 109–110
Panama	3
Curaçao	0
Position 111–112
Nepal	3
Isle of Man	0
Position 113–116
Uganda	2
Tanzania	3
Faroe Islands	3
Zambia	2
