= Kim Min-seok (table tennis) =

South Korean table tennis player

Kim Min-Seok
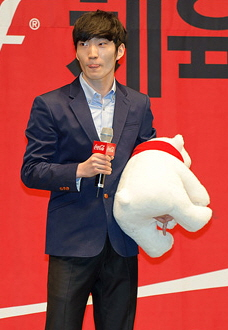

Personal information
- Nationality: South Korea
- Born: 25 February 1992 (age 34)
- Height: 1.77 m (5 ft 9 1/2 in)
- Weight: 66 kg (146 lb; 10.4 st)

Sport
- Sport: Table tennis
- Highest ranking: 15 (April 2014)
Medal record
Men's table tennis
Representing South Korea
World Championships
Bronze medal – third place	2012 Dortmund	Team
Bronze medal – third place	2011 Rotterdam	Doubles
World Cup
Silver medal – second place	2011 Magdeburg	Team
Asian Games
Silver medal – second place	2014 Incheon	Team
Silver medal – second place	2010 Guangzhou	Team
Bronze medal – third place	2014 Incheon	Mixed Doubles
Bronze medal – third place	2010 Guangzhou	Doubles
Asian Championships
Silver medal – second place	2012 Macau	Doubles
Bronze medal – third place	2012 Macau	Team
Summer Universiade
Gold medal – first place	2015 Gwangju	Mixed Doubles
Bronze medal – third place	2015 Gwangju	Men's Doubles

Kim Min-Seok (born February 25, 1992) is a South Korean male table tennis player. He is a member of the South Korean national team and won several medals at international tournaments including the World Table Tennis Championships. He is currently ranked at number 89 in the world as of September 2016, with his all-time high being number 15 in April 2014.
