= Afshin Norouzi =

Iranian table tennis player

Afshin Noroozi
Personal information
- Full name: Afshin Norouzi
- Nationality: Iran
- Born: April 22, 1985 (age 41) Ahvaz, Iran
- Height: 179cm / 5 ft 10 in
- Weight: 80 kg / 176 lb

Sport
- Sport: Table tennis
- Highest ranking: 187 (May 2015)
Medal record
Men's table tennis
Representing Iran
Islamic Solidarity Games
Gold medal – first place	2017 Baku	Team
Gold medal – first place	2021 Konya	Team
Silver medal – second place	2005 Ta'if	Doubles
Silver medal – second place	2005 Ta'if	Team

Afshin Norouzi (Persian: افشین نوروزی, born 22 April 1985) is an Iranian table tennis player. He was born in Ahvaz, Iran.
