= Mohammad Reza Akhlaghpasand =

Iranian table tennis player

Shahin Akhlaghpasand
Personal information
- Full name: Mohammad Reza Akhlaghpasand محمدرضا اخلاق‌پسند
- Nickname: Shahin
- Nationality: Iran
- Born: Mohamadreza Akhlaghpasand; 12 December 1978 (age 47) Rasht, Imperial State of Iran
- Height: 168 cm (5 ft 6 in)
- Weight: 65 kg (143 lb)

Sport
- Sport: Table tennis
- Club: ATTC
- Playing style: Offensive Control-Based Looper
- Equipment: Butterfly Sardius, Butterfly Gergely Carbon (discontinued)
- Highest ranking: 263 (February 2010)
Medal record
Men's table tennis
Representing Iran
Islamic Solidarity Games
Silver medal – second place	2005 Ta'if	Team
Bronze medal – third place	2005 Ta'if	Singles
Bronze medal – third place	2005 Ta'if	Doubles

2004 Athens olympian, 4 times Iranian national champion and Iranian former table tennis national team player.

Mohammad Reza Akhlaghpasand (Persian: محمدرضا اخلاق‌پسند, born 12 December 1978 in Rasht) also known as Shahin Akhlaghpasand (شاهین اخلاق‌پسند) is an Iranian table tennis player.
